= List of 2024–25 PWHL Three Star Awards =

The 2024–25 PWHL Three Star Awards are the way the Professional Women's Hockey League denotes its players of the week for the 2024–25 season.

== Weekly ==
In addition to each weekly award, points for each star earned are awarded and tallied throughout the regular season and postseason to create a cumulative score. First star of the week earns 30 points, second star gets 20 points, and third star receives 10 points.

Week	First Star	Second Star	Third Star
December 2, 2024	Alex Carpenter (NY)	Marie-Philip Poulin (MTL)	Abby Boreen (MTL)
December 9, 2024	Sarah Fillier (NY)	Michela Cava (MIN)	Alex Carpenter (NY)
December 16, 2024	No games, IIHF National Team break		
December 23, 2024	Claire Thompson (MIN)	Abby Boreen (MTL)	Kendall Coyne Schofield (MIN)
December 30, 2024	Emerance Maschmeyer (OTT)	Kateřina Mrázová (OTT)	Marie-Philip Poulin (MTL)
January 6, 2025	Susanna Tapani (BOS)	Megan Keller (BOS)	Hilary Knight (BOS)
January 13, 2025	Marie-Philip Poulin (MTL)	Corinne Schroeder (NY)	Sidney Morin (BOS)
January 20, 2025	Erin Ambrose (NY)	Abby Boreen (MTL)	Kendall Coyne Schofield (MIN)
January 27, 2025	Alina Müller (BOS)	Hannah Miller (TOR)	Taylor Heise (MIN)
February 3, 2025	Marie-Philip Poulin (MTL)	Renata Fast (TOR)	Ann-Renée Desbiens (MTL)
February 10, 2025	No games, IIHF National Team break		
February 17, 2025	Gabbie Hughes (OTT)	Hannah Miller (TOR)	Sophie Jaques (MIN)
February 24, 2025	Emily Clark (OTT)	Kristen Campbell (TOR)	Hannah Miller (TOR)
March 3, 2025	Laura Stacey (MTL)	Gabbie Hughes (OTT)	Kati Tabin (MTL)
March 10, 2025	Hilary Knight (BOS)	Laura Stacey (MTL)	Maddie Rooney (MIN)
March 17, 2025	Hilary Knight (BOS)	Abby Roque (NY)	Corinne Schroeder (NY)
March 24, 2025	Tereza Vanišová (OTT)	Kristen Campbell (TOR)	Susanna Tapani (BOS)
March 31, 2025	Laura Stacey (MTL)	Tereza Vanišová (OTT)	Daryl Watts (TOR)
April 7, 2025	Shiann Darkangelo (OTT)	Gwyneth Philips (OTT)	Corinne Schroeder (NY)
April 14, 2025	No games, IIHF National Team break		
April 21, 2025	No games, IIHF National Team break		
April 28, 2025	Ashton Bell (OTT)	Corinne Schroeder (NY)	Klára Peslarová (MIN)
May 5, 2025	Nicole Hensley (MIN)	Lee Stecklein (MIN)	Marie-Philip Poulin (MTL)
May 12, 2025	Lee Stecklein (MIN)	Gwyneth Philips (OTT)	Ann-Renée Desbiens (MTL)
May 19, 2025	Gwyneth Philips (OTT)	Taylor Heise (MIN)	Gabbie Hughes (OTT)
May 26, 2025	Maddie Rooney (MIN)	Gwyneth Philips (OTT)	Emily Clark (OTT)
May 30, 2025	Maddie Rooney (MIN)	Liz Schepers (MIN)	Gwyneth Philips (OTT)

== SupraStars of the Month ==
Month	Position	Player	Team
December	F	Alex Carpenter	New York Sirens
December	F	Sarah Fillier	New York Sirens
December	F	Sarah Nurse	Toronto Sceptres
December	D	Jincy Roese	Ottawa Charge
December	D	Claire Thompson	Minnesota Frost
December	G	Emerance Maschmeyer	Ottawa Charge
January	F	Kendall Coyne Schofield	Minnesota Frost
January	F	Hannah Miller	Toronto Sceptres
January	F	Marie-Philip Poulin	Montreal Victoire
January	D	Erin Ambrose	Montreal Victoire
January	D	Claire Thompson	Minnesota Frost
January	G	Corinne Schroeder	New York Sirens
February	F	Emily Clark	Ottawa Charge
February	F	Gabbie Hughes	Ottawa Charge
February	F	Hannah Miller	Toronto Sceptres
February	D	Renata Fast	Toronto Sceptres
February	D	Sophie Jaques	Minnesota Frost
February	G	Aerin Frankel	Boston Fleet
March	F	Hilary Knight	Boston Fleet
March	F	Laura Stacey	Montreal Victoire
March	F	Tereza Vanišová	Ottawa Charge
March	D	Renata Fast	Toronto Sceptres
March	D	Sophie Jaques	Minnesota Frost
March	G	Kristen Campbell	Toronto Sceptres
April	F	Shiann Darkangelo	Ottawa Charge
April	F	Laura Stacey	Montreal Victoire
April	F	Jamie Lee Rattray	Boston Fleet
April	D	Ashton Bell	Ottawa Charge
April	D	Lee Stecklein	Minnesota Frost
April	G	Corinne Schroeder	New York Sirens
May	F	Emily Clark	Ottawa Charge
May	F	Taylor Heise	Minnesota Frost
May	F	Britta Curl-Salemme	Minnesota Frost
May	D	Sophie Jaques	Minnesota Frost
May	D	Lee Stecklein	Minnesota Frost
May	G	Gwyneth Philips	Ottawa Charge
