= List of 2025–26 PWHL Player of the Week Awards =

The 2025–26 PWHL Player of the Week Awards are the way the Professional Women's Hockey League denotes its player of the week for the 2025–26 season.

== Weekly ==
Weekly
Week	Player	Team
November 24, 2025	Taylor Girard	New York Sirens
December 1, 2025	Brianne Jenner	Ottawa Charge
December 8, 2025	Kendall Coyne Schofield	Minnesota Frost
December 22, 2025	Jesse Compher	Toronto Sceptres
December 29, 2025	Casey O'Brien	New York Sirens
January 5, 2026	Marie-Philip Poulin	Montreal Victoire
January 12, 2026	Brianne Jenner	Ottawa Charge
January 19, 2026	Aerin Frankel	Boston Fleet
January 26, 2026	Maureen Murphy	Montreal Victoire
January 29, 2026	Kristýna Kaltounková	New York Sirens
March 2, 2026	Ann-Renée Desbiens	Montreal Victoire
March 9, 2026	Taylor Heise	Minnesota Frost
March 16, 2026	Megan Keller	Boston Fleet
March 23, 2026	Kelly Pannek	Minnesota Frost
March 30, 2026	Aerin Frankel	Boston Fleet
April 6, 2026	Sarah Fillier	New York Sirens
April 13, 2026	Ann-Renée Desbiens	Montreal Victoire
April 20, 2026	Jenn Gardiner	Vancouver Goldeneyes
April 27, 2026	Gwyneth Philips	Ottawa Charge
May 4, 2026	Laura Stacey	Montreal Victoire
May 11, 2026	Gwyneth Philips	Ottawa Charge
May 18, 2026	Marie-Philip Poulin	Montreal Victoire

== Starting Six ==
The Starting Six is voted on each month by the Women's Chapter of the Professional Hockey Writers' Association (PHWA) and PWHL broadcast personnel.

Monthly
Month	Position	Player	Team
November	F	Taylor Girard	New York Sirens
November	F	Brianne Jenner	Ottawa Charge
November	F	Susanna Tapani	Boston Fleet
November	D	Megan Keller	Boston Fleet
November	D	Claire Thompson	Vancouver Goldeneyes
November	G	Aerin Frankel	Boston Fleet
December	F	Kendall Coyne Schofield	Minnesota Frost
December	F	Britta Curl-Salemme	Minnesota Frost
December	F	Daryl Watts	Toronto Sceptres
December	D	Megan Keller	Boston Fleet
December	D	Haley Winn	Boston Fleet
December	G	Aerin Frankel	Boston Fleet
January	F	Taylor Heise	Minnesota Frost
January	F	Kristýna Kaltounková	New York Sirens
January	F	Marie-Philip Poulin	Montreal Victoire
January	D	Nicole Gosling	Montreal Victoire
January	D	Megan Keller	Boston Fleet
January	G	Ann-Renée Desbiens	Montreal Victoire
March (Note: This includes the post-Olympic games from February 26–28.)	F	Kelly Pannek	Minnesota Frost
March	F	Laura Stacey	Montreal Victoire
March	F	Susanna Tapani	Boston Fleet
March	D	Nicole Gosling	Montreal Victoire
March	D	Haley Winn	Boston Fleet
March	G	Aerin Frankel	Boston Fleet
April	F	Jessie Eldridge	Boston Fleet
April	F	Jenn Gardiner	Vancouver Goldeneyes
April	F	Kelly Pannek	Minnesota Frost
April	D	Nicole Gosling	Montreal Victoire
April	D	Sophie Jaques	Vancouver Goldeneyes
April	G	Ann-Renée Desbiens	Montreal Victoire
May	F	Rebecca Leslie	Ottawa Charge
May	F	Marie-Philip Poulin	Montreal Victoire
May	F	Abby Roque	Montreal Victoire
May	D	Maggie Flaherty	Montreal Victoire
May	D	Sidney Morin	Vancouver Goldeneyes
May	G	Ann-Renée Desbiens	Montreal Victoire
