= 2026 Walter Cup playoffs =

Women's hockey postseason tournament

Tournament details
- Dates: April 30 – May 20
- Teams: 4
- Defending champions: Minnesota Frost

Final positions
- Champions: Montreal Victoire (1st)
- Runners-up: Ottawa Charge

Awards
- MVP: Marie-Philip Poulin (Victoire)

The 2026 Walter Cup playoffs was the playoff tournament of the Professional Women's Hockey League (PWHL) for the 2025–26 season. The playoffs began on April 30, 2026, and concluded with the PWHL Finals on May 20, 2026, with the Montreal Victoire winning their first Walter Cup.

The Boston Fleet were the first team to make the playoffs, when they did so on March 29 in a 4–2 win over the Minnesota Frost. In doing so, they became the fastest team in league history to clinch a playoff spot, having accomplished the feat in their 24th game of the season. Three days later, the Montreal Victoire were the second team to qualify for the playoffs, after a 3–0 win over the Vancouver Goldeneyes. On April 4, the Minnesota Frost clinched a spot after defeating the Goldeneyes, 6–5.

The Ottawa Charge qualified for the fourth and final playoff spot in their last regular season game, defeating the Toronto Sceptres, 3–0 on April 25. The Sceptres would have earned the playoff spot instead had they won the game in regulation. It was the first time in league history that Toronto had missed the playoffs. Montreal secured first place in their final game of the season, also on April 25, a 2–1 shootout victory against the Seattle Torrent. They finished the season tied with the Boston Fleet at 62 points, but held the tiebreaker over Boston.

== Playoff bracket ==
On April 26, 2026, by virtue of finishing first overall, the Montreal Victoire chose the Minnesota Frost as their first-round opponent.

Semi-finals
April 30–May 10, Tsongas Center and Canadian Tire Centre
Boston Fleet	2	1	1	3	–
Ottawa Charge	1	3	2	4**	–
May 2–12, Place Bell and Grand Casino Arena
Montreal Victoire	4	1***	2	1	2
Minnesota Frost	5*	0	1	3	1

Finals
May 14–20, Place Bell and Canadian Tire Centre
Ottawa Charge	2	1	2	0	–
Montreal Victoire	3*	2*	1	4	–

* - Denotes overtime period(s)

=== Semi-finals ===
==== Montreal (1) vs. Minnesota (3) ====
Montreal finished first overall in the league with a record of 16-6-2-6, earning 62 points. Minnesota finished third overall with 50 points and a record of 13-3-5-9. Montreal won all four games against Minnesota in the regular season, two of which were in overtime.

The Minnesota Frost took the series lead in Game 1 with a 5-4 win after Jincy Roese scored 4:30 into overtime. It was the third straight year that Montreal lost game one of their first round series on home ice. Katy Knoll, Kendall Coyne Schofield, Grace Zumwinkle, and Sidney Morin scored the other goals for Minnesota, while Shiann Darkangelo gave the Victoire their first goal. The Victoire's other three goals were all scored by Laura Stacey, marking the first playoff hat trick in league history. Minnesota's Britta Curl-Salemme was suspended for one game due to an illegal check to the head against Kaitlin Willoughby and fined $250 due to pulling Abby Roque's facial protector, which caused Roque to fall to the ice.

In Game 2, Montreal's Marie-Philip Poulin scored the only goal of the game at the 4:02 mark in triple overtime to give Montreal the 1–0 win. Ann-Renée Desbiens recorded her first career playoff shutout, stopping all 38 Minnesota shots. Maddie Rooney made 51 saves in the loss for Minnesota. It was Minnesota's seventh straight playoff game to go to overtime, and it was the third playoff game in league history with only one goal scored.

In Game 3, Minnesota took the early lead thanks to a goal by Sidney Morin 3:22 into the first period, her second goal of the playoffs and in the entire season. Ultimately, however, the game resulted in a 2-1 Montreal win thanks to goals scored by Maggie Flaherty and Hayley Scamurra 24 seconds apart in the second period, giving the Victoire a series lead of 2-1.

In Game 4, Montreal took a late lead at 1:13 of the third period thanks to a goal by Maureen Murphy. This was answered by two goals from Minnesota's Sidney Morin. An empty netter from Kelly Pannek secured Minnesota's 3-1 win over Montreal, forcing a game 5 and continuing the Frost's 5-0 franchise record in playoff elimination games.

Game 5 was originally scheduled to be played on Monday, May 11th, at 7:00 pm. However, at 3:40 pm on May 11, the league announced that the game had been postponed until Tuesday, May 12th due to multiple illnesses on the Victoire. In Game 5, Montreal clinched the series with a 2–1 win thanks to Marie-Philip Poulin's game-winning goal at 3:06 in the third. It was the first time in franchise history that the Minnesota Frost had lost a game while facing elimination, having won the previous six times. Sam Cogan was the goal scorer for Minnesota, while Catherine Dubois scored the other Montreal goal.

May 2	Minnesota Frost	5–4	OT	Montreal Victoire	Place Bell	Recap
Katy Knoll (1) – 8:36; Kendall Coyne Schofield (1) – pp – 16:16		First period		No scoring
Grace Zumwinkle (1) – 18:35		Second period		2:46 – Shiann Darkangelo (1); 17:49 – Laura Stacey (1)
Sidney Morin (1) – sh – 3:46		Third period		2:58 – pp – Laura Stacey (2); 4:46 – pp – Laura Stacey (3)
Jincy Roese (1) – 4:30		First overtime period		No scoring
Maddie Rooney 21 saves / 25 shots		Goalie stats		Ann-Renée Desbiens 24 saves / 29 shots

May 5	Minnesota Frost	0–1	3OT	Montreal Victoire	Place Bell	Recap
No scoring		First period		No scoring
No scoring		Second period		No scoring
No scoring		Third period		No scoring
No scoring		Third overtime period		4:02 – Marie-Philip Poulin (1)
Maddie Rooney 51 saves / 52 shots		Goalie stats		Ann-Renée Desbiens 38 saves / 38 shots

May 7	Montreal Victoire	2–1	Minnesota Frost	Grand Casino Arena	Recap
No scoring		First period	3:22 – Sidney Morin (2)
Maggie Flaherty (1) – 4:36; Hayley Scamurra (1) – 5:00		Second period	No scoring
No scoring		Third period	No scoring
Ann-Renée Desbiens 27 saves / 28 shots		Goalie stats	Maddie Rooney 17 saves / 19 shots

May 8	Montreal Victoire	1–3	Minnesota Frost	Grand Casino Arena	Recap
No scoring		First period	No scoring
No scoring		Second period	No scoring
Maureen Murphy (1) – 1:13		Third period	8:05 – Sidney Morin (3); 12:01 – pp – Sidney Morin (4); 18:43 – en – Kelly Pannek (1)
Ann-Renée Desbiens 28 saves / 30 shots		Goalie stats	Maddie Rooney 29 saves / 30 shots

May 12	Minnesota Frost	1–2	Montreal Victoire	Place Bell	Recap
No scoring		First period	12:18 – Catherine Dubois (1)
Samantha Cogan (1) – 8:15		Second period	No scoring
No scoring		Third period	3:06 – Marie-Philip Poulin (2)
Maddie Rooney 15 saves / 17 shots		Goalie stats	Ann-Renée Desbiens 25 saves / 26 shots

Montreal won series 3–2

==== Boston (2) vs. Ottawa (4) ====
Boston finished in second place in the league, earning 62 points in the standings with a record of 16-5-4-5. Ottawa finished fourth with 44 points and a record of 9-8-1-12. Ottawa beat Boston three times in the regular season, twice in a shootout, and once in overtime. Boston beat Ottawa once, in a shootout.

In Game 1, Boston took the early series lead with a 2–1 win. The game was characterized by the amount of penalties taken, with a total of 25 minutes for both teams, including 3 penalties in the first ten minutes. Jocelyne Larocque opened the scoring for Ottawa, tipping a shot from Rory Guilday at the 18 minute mark. Boston's Alina Müller scored the equalizer at 17:56 of the second, with Jamie Lee Rattray scoring the go ahead for the Fleet soon after. Her goal proved to be the decider.

In Game 2, Ottawa evened up the series at one game apiece, beating Boston 3–1. Ronja Savolainen opened up the scoring for the Charge with a wrist shot from inside the blue line with 6:44 to go in the first. Fanuza Kadirova doubled the goals for Ottawa 1:52 into the second period with a one-timer from the right circle, beating Aerin Frankel on her glove side. Megan Keller scored for Boston with just 10 seconds to go in the second. With Frankel pulled for an extra attacker, Gabbie Hughes scored on the empty net to give Ottawa the insurance marker. Gwyneth Philips made 30 saves in the winning effort.

In Game 3, Ottawa took the series lead thanks to a goal scored by Ronja Savolainen with 29 seconds left in the third period, breaking a 1–1 tie. The goal was scored when Savolainen shot the puck off the back boards, which bounced back onto Boston's goaltender Aerin Frankel's skate and into the net. The game was played in front of 13,112 fans, setting a PWHL playoff record. Fanuza Kadirova scored the other goal for Ottawa. Gwyneth Philips made 36 saves for the Charge, leading all playoff goaltenders with a 1.34 goals against average and a .958 save percentage.

Members of the Charge celebrate after Ottawa's game 4 overtime winning goal

Ottawa won the series in game 4, beating the Fleet 4–3 in double overtime and sending the Charge to their second straight PWHL finals. Michela Cava scored the winning goal for the Charge at the 1:12 mark in the second extra frame, redirecting a shot by Kateřina Mrázová. Ottawa scored the opening goal in the first period at the 6:38 mark when Fanuza Kadirova shot a one-timer which was tipped by Sarah Wozniewicz. Ottawa took a 2–0 lead early in the second when Brianne Jenner made a shot from behind the goal line that deflected off of Rebecca Leslie's skate and into the net. After a review, it was confirmed as a good goal. The Fleet came roaring back with three goals in just 1 minute and 33 seconds span in the second period thanks to goals by Shay Maloney, Megan Keller and Sophie Shirley. It marked the first time in 10 games where Ottawa allowed more than two goals in a game. However, Ottawa tied the game up at the 12:12 mark of the second period when Boston goalie Aerin Frankel bobbled a shot by Fanuza Kadirova, which was scooped up by Brooke Hobson to tie the game for Ottawa. The game then saw two straight score-less periods before Cava netted the winner.

April 30	Ottawa Charge	1–2	Boston Fleet	Tsongas Center	Recap
Jocelyne Larocque (1) – pp – 18:06		First period	No scoring
No scoring		Second period	17:56 – Alina Müller (1); 19:27 – Jamie Lee Rattray (1)
No scoring		Third period	No scoring
Gwyneth Philips 26 saves / 28 shots		Goalie stats	Aerin Frankel 17 saves / 18 shots

May 2	Ottawa Charge	3–1	Boston Fleet	Tsongas Center	Recap
Ronja Savolainen (1) – 13:16		First period	No scoring
Fanuza Kadirova (1) – 1:54		Second period	19:50 – Megan Keller (1)
Gabbie Hughes (1) – en – 18:30		Third period	No scoring
Gwyneth Philips 30 saves / 31 shots		Goalie stats	Aerin Frankel 18 saves / 20 shots

May 8	Boston Fleet	1–2	Ottawa Charge	Canadian Tire Centre	Recap
No scoring		First period	13:33 – Fanuza Kadirova (2)
Liz Schepers (1) – 5:11		Second period	No scoring
No scoring		Third period	19:31 – Ronja Savolainen (2)
Aerin Frankel 20 saves / 22 shots		Goalie stats	Gwyneth Philips 36 saves / 37 shots

May 10	Boston Fleet	3–4	2OT	Ottawa Charge	Canadian Tire Centre	Recap
No scoring		First period		6:38 – pp – Sarah Wozniewicz (1)
Shay Maloney (1) – 5:19; Megan Keller (2) – pp – 6:00; Sophie Shirley (1) – 6:52		Second period		3:25 – Rebecca Leslie (1); 12:12 – Brooke Hobson (1)
No scoring		Third period		No scoring
No scoring		Second overtime period		1:12 – Michela Cava (1)
Aerin Frankel 29 saves / 33 shots		Goalie stats		Gwyneth Philips 43 saves / 46 shots

Ottawa won series 3–1

=== Finals ===
This was the first all-Canadian final in PWHL history, and the first to not include Minnesota, who won the previous two championships. It was the second straight year for the Charge to make it to the final, while it was the first finals appearance for the Victoire. Montreal won three of the four regular season matchups, with Ottawa winning the other game in overtime.

May 14	Ottawa Charge	2–3	OT	Montreal Victoire	Place Bell	Recap
No scoring		First period		No scoring
Rebecca Leslie (2) – 16:56		Second period		No scoring
Rebecca Leslie (3) – 15:56		Third period		12:12 – Abby Roque (1); 19:57 – Nicole Gosling (1)
No scoring		First overtime period		2:29 – Abby Roque (2)
Gwyneth Philips 23 saves / 26 shots		Goalie stats		Ann-Renée Desbiens 23 saves / 25 shots

May 16	Ottawa Charge	1–2	OT	Montreal Victoire	Place Bell	Recap
Sarah Wozniewicz (2) – 8:38		First period		No scoring
No scoring		Second period		0:32 – Kati Tabin (1)
No scoring		Third period		No scoring
No scoring		First overtime period		14:12 – Maggie Flaherty (2)
Gwyneth Philips 27 saves / 29 shots		Goalie stats		Ann-Renée Desbiens 20 saves / 21 shots

May 18	Montreal Victoire	1–2	Ottawa Charge	Canadian Tire Centre	Recap
No scoring		First period	No scoring
No scoring		Second period	No scoring
Hayley Scamurra (2) – 7:32		Third period	14:30 – Peyton Hemp (1); 19:04 – Rebecca Leslie (4)
Ann-Renée Desbiens 26 saves / 28 shots		Goalie stats	Gwyneth Philips 27 saves / 28 shots

May 20	Montreal Victoire	4–0	Ottawa Charge	Canadian Tire Centre	Recap
No scoring		First period	No scoring
Abby Roque (3) – 3:49		Second period	No scoring
Abby Roque (4) – 9:58; Maggie Flaherty (3) – 13:54; Lina Ljungblom (1) – 15:44		Third period	No scoring
Ann-Renée Desbiens 23 saves / 23 shots		Goalie stats	Gwyneth Philips 12 saves / 16 shots

Montreal won series 3–1

=== Player statistics ===
==== Scoring leaders ====
Player	Team	GP	G	A	Pts	+/–	PIM
Abby Roque	Montreal Victoire	9	4	4	8	+2	6
Marie-Philip Poulin	Montreal Victoire	9	2	6	8	+1	6
Laura Stacey	Montreal Victoire	9	3	4	7	0	8
Rebecca Leslie	Ottawa Charge	8	4	2	6	-1	2
Fanuza Kadirova	Ottawa Charge	8	2	3	5	+3	2
Sidney Morin	Minnesota Frost	5	4	0	4	+2	2
Maggie Flaherty	Montreal Victoire	9	3	1	4	+3	8
Sarah Wozniewicz	Ottawa Charge	8	2	2	4	+2	2
Ronja Savolainen	Ottawa Charge	8	2	2	4	-2	4
Hayley Scamurra	Montreal Victoire	9	2	2	4	+4	0

==== Leading goaltenders ====
Player	Team	GP	TOI	W	L	OTL	GA	SO	SV%	GAA
Ann-Renée Desbiens	Montreal Victoire	9	600:53	6	2	1	14	2	.944	1.40
Maddie Rooney	Minnesota Frost	5	344:14	2	2	1	10	0	.930	1.74
Gwyneth Philips	Ottawa Charge	8	512:33	4	2	2	17	0	.929	1.99
Aerin Frankel	Boston Fleet	4	258:55	1	3	0	9	0	.903	2.09

=== Attendance ===
Playoff attendance
Home team	Home games	Average attendance	Total attendance
Ottawa	4	13,416	53,665
Montreal	5	7,458	37,292
Minnesota	2	5,914	11,828
Boston	2	5,151	10,302
League	13	8,699	113,087

== Media ==
The Boston–Ottawa semifinal series aired on TSN in Canada, and NESN in the United States, while the Minnesota–Montreal semifinal series aired on Prime Video in Canada and FOX 9+ in the United States. The finals were aired on TSN in English and RDS in French, and on Ion Television in the United States.
