= 2025 Walter Cup Finals =

Women's hockey championship series

2025 PWHL Finals
	1	2	3	4	Total
Minnesota Frost	1*	2*	2***	2*	3
Ottawa Charge	2*	1*	1***	1*	1
- * – Denotes overtime period(s)
- Location(s): Ottawa: TD Place Arena (1, 2); Saint Paul: Xcel Energy Center (3, 4)
- Format: Best-of-five
- Coaches: Minnesota: Ken Klee; Ottawa: Carla MacLeod
- Captains: Minnesota: Kendall Coyne Schofield; Ottawa: Brianne Jenner
- Dates: May 20–26
- MVP: Gwyneth Philips (Ottawa Charge)
- Networks: Canada: (English): TSN (French): RDS; United States: (English): FanDuel
- Announcers: (English): Kenzie Lalonde and Cheryl Pounder (French): Claudine Douville and Isabelle Leclaire

The 2025 PWHL Finals was the championship series of the Professional Women's Hockey League 2024–25 PWHL season and the culmination of the 2025 PWHL playoffs. The winners of the semifinals, the Ottawa Charge and the Minnesota Frost competed in a best-of-five series to determine the league's champion and winner of the Walter Cup. The Frost defeated the Charge in four games to win their second consecutive Walter Cup, with each game going into overtime, and the score being 2–1.

The series began on May 20. The Charge had home-ice advantage in the series as the team with the better regular season record. Both teams had 44 points in the regular season, however Ottawa earned a higher ranking due to having more regulation wins than Minnesota.

It was the second straight season that both teams heading into the final were the lower ranked seeds in the semifinals.

In the regular season, the two teams played each other six times, with both teams winning three games.

== Paths to the Finals ==
=== Minnesota Frost ===
This was Minnesota's second straight Finals appearance, having won the Walter Cup in 2024 in the league's inaugural season. In 2024, they defeated PWHL Boston 3 games to 2 to win the league's championship.

The Frost finished the regular season with 44 points, with a record 10 regulation wins, 5 overtime wins, 4 overtime losses and 11 regulation losses. This earned them the fourth and final playoff spot, which they earned in their final regular season game against the Boston Fleet, whom they defeated 8–1.

Despite finishing fourth in the regular season, the Frost played off against the second place Toronto Sceptres in the semifinal, as the number one Montreal Victoire chose the third place Ottawa Charge as their playoff opponents. In the semifinals, the Frost defeated the Sceptres three games to one to earn their trip to the Finals.

=== Ottawa Charge ===
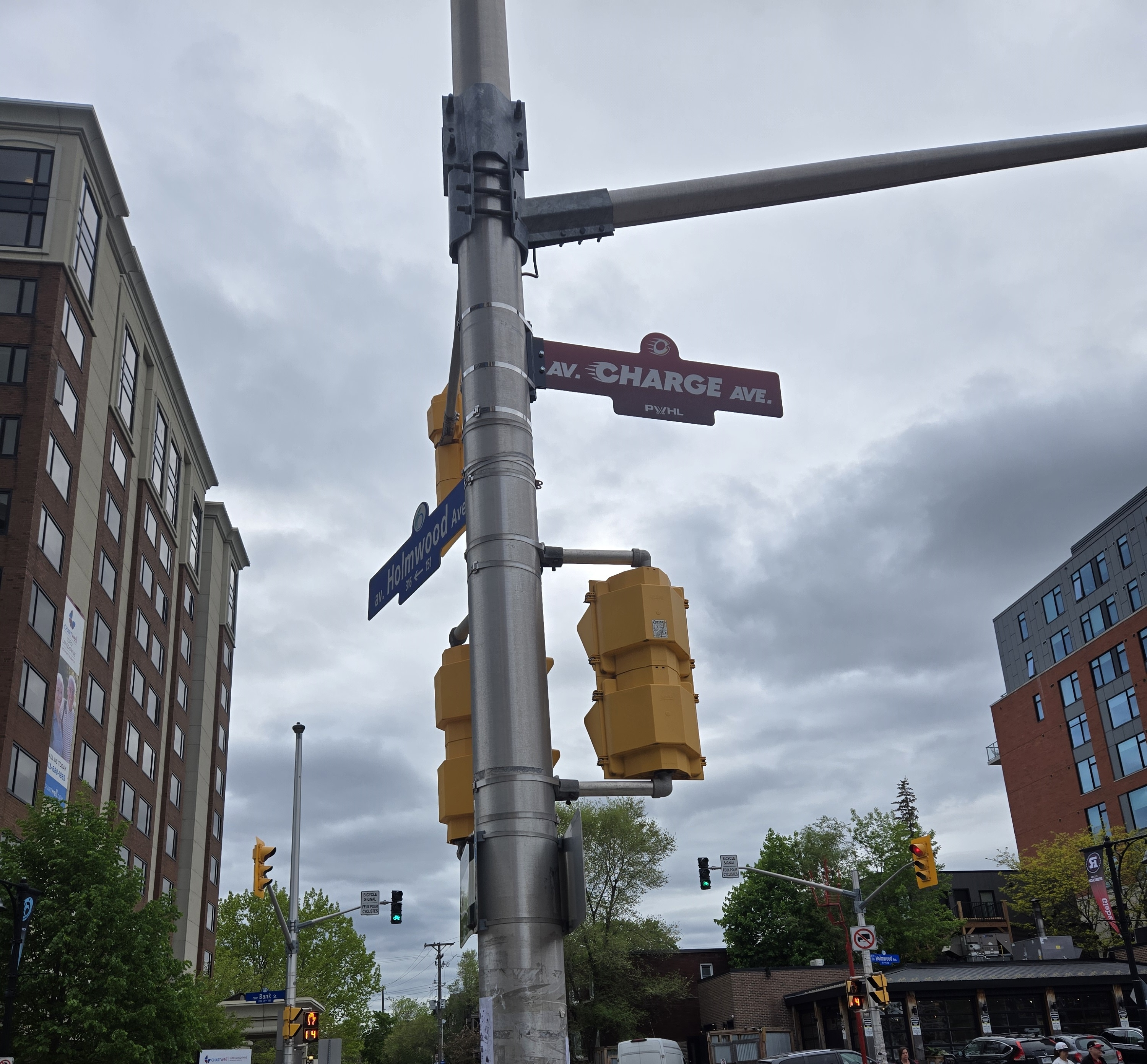
The City of Ottawa temporarily renamed a section of Bank Street "Charge Avenue" in honour of the team's playoff run

The Ottawa Charge made the playoffs for the first time in 2025, having failed to make it in the league's inaugural season.

The Charge finished the season with 44 points, with a record of 12 regulation wins, 2 overtime wins, 4 overtime losses and 12 regulation losses. This earned them third place in the regular season standings. The team earned their playoff spot in their final regular season game against the Toronto Sceptres, thanks to an overtime goal by Kateřina Mrázová, giving the Charge a 2–1 victory.

Despite the Charge finishing third in the regular season, the first place Montreal Victoire chose Ottawa as their semifinal opponents. The Charge went on to upset the Victoire in four games. The Charge's only loss was in a marathon game held on Mother's Day, which Montreal won at 15:54 in the fourth overtime, the longest game in PWHL history.

== Game summaries ==
=== Game one ===
May 20	Minnesota Frost	1–2	OT	Ottawa Charge	TD Place Arena	Recap

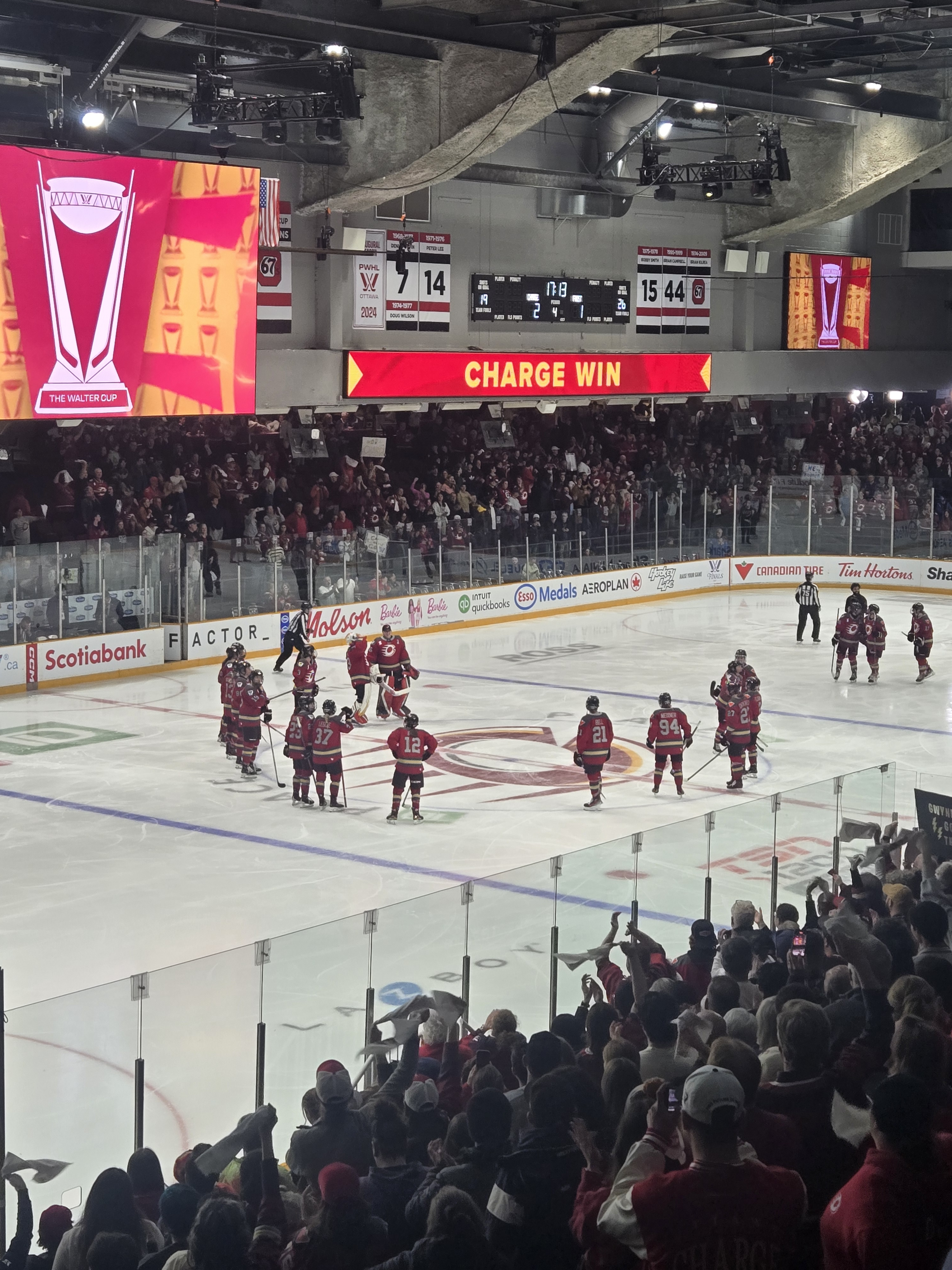
The Ottawa Charge gather around centre ice after winning game 1

Ottawa's Rebecca Leslie got the series' first goal midway through the second period of game 1 to give the Charge a 1–0 lead. She scored on Minnesota net minder Nicole Hensley who was partially screened by teammate Lee Stecklein. In the third, Ottawa's goaltender Gwyneth Philips mishandled the puck, turning it over to Minnesota's Katy Knoll, who quickly passed it to Klára Hymlárová who scored in the vacant net to tie the game. The game then headed into overtime with both teams knotted at one. In overtime, Ottawa's Emily Clark came down the wing, scoring the game winner, just 2:47 into the frame. With the win, the Charge extended their perfect playoff record on home ice, having won all three games. For Minnesota, it was the fourth time they had lost a series opener, having never won a game 1 in franchise history.

Scoring summary
Period	Team	Goal	Assist(s)	Time	Score
1st	None				
2nd	OTT	Rebecca Leslie (2)	Tereza Vanišová (3) and Jocelyne Larocque (2)	11:34	1–0 OTT
3rd	MIN	Klára Hymlárová (1)	Katy Knoll (2)	05:24	1–1
OT	OTT	Emily Clark (2)	Unassisted	02:47	2–1 OTT

Penalty summary
Period	Team	Player	Penalty	Time	PIM
1st	OTT	Stephanie Markowski	Slashing	07:45	2:00
1st	MIN	Michela Cava	Hooking	13:23	2:00
2nd	OTT	Tereza Vanišová	Illegal body checking	09:23	2:00
2nd	MIN	Dominique Petrie	Hooking	18:24	2:00
3rd	MIN	Kelly Pannek	Holding	13:52	2:00
3rd	OTT	Rebecca Leslie	Cross-checking	13:52	2:00
OT	None				

Shots by period
Team	1	2	3	OT	Total
MIN	4	11	10	1	26
OTT	9	6	3	1	19

Power play opportunities
Team	Goals/Opportunities
Minnesota	0/2
Ottawa	0/2

Three star selections
	Team	Player	Statistics
1st	OTT	Emily Clark	1 goal
2nd	OTT	Gwyneth Philips	25 saves
3rd	OTT	Rebecca Leslie	1 goal

=== Game two ===
May 22	Minnesota Frost	2–1	OT	Ottawa Charge	TD Place Arena	Recap

Scoring summary
Period	Team	Goal	Assist(s)	Time	Score
1st	None				
2nd	None				
3rd	OTT	Jocelyne Larocque (1)	Anna Meixner (2) and Rebecca Leslie (1)	17:25	1–0 OTT
3rd	MIN	Britta Curl-Salemme (2) – pp	Claire Thompson (3) and Lee Stecklein (4)	19:44	1–1
OT	MIN	Britta Curl-Salemme (3)	Mellissa Channell-Watkins (4) and Claire Thompson (4)	16:24	2–1 MIN

Penalty summary
Period	Team	Player	Penalty	Time	PIM
1st	OTT	Tereza Vanišová	Holding	04:32	2:00
2nd	OTT	Ronja Savolainen	Illegal body checking	09:09	2:00
2nd	MIN	Michela Cava	Tripping	11:16	2:00
2nd	OTT	Taylor House	Tripping	14:22	2:00
3rd	MIN	Claire Thompson	Interference	01:42	2:00
3rd	OTT	Tereza Vanišová	Hooking	06:34	2:00
3rd	OTT	Tereza Vanišová	Tripping	19:23	2:00
OT	None				

Shots by period
Team	1	2	3	OT	Total
MIN	3	6	10	5	24
OTT	8	16	6	8	38

Power play opportunities
Team	Goals/Opportunities
Minnesota	1/5
Ottawa	0/2

Three star selections
	Team	Player	Statistics
1st	MIN	Britta Curl-Salemme	2 goals
2nd	MIN	Maddie Rooney	37 saves
3rd	OTT	Jocelyne Larocque	1 goal

=== Game three ===
May 24	Ottawa Charge	1–2	3OT	Minnesota Frost	Xcel Energy Center	Recap

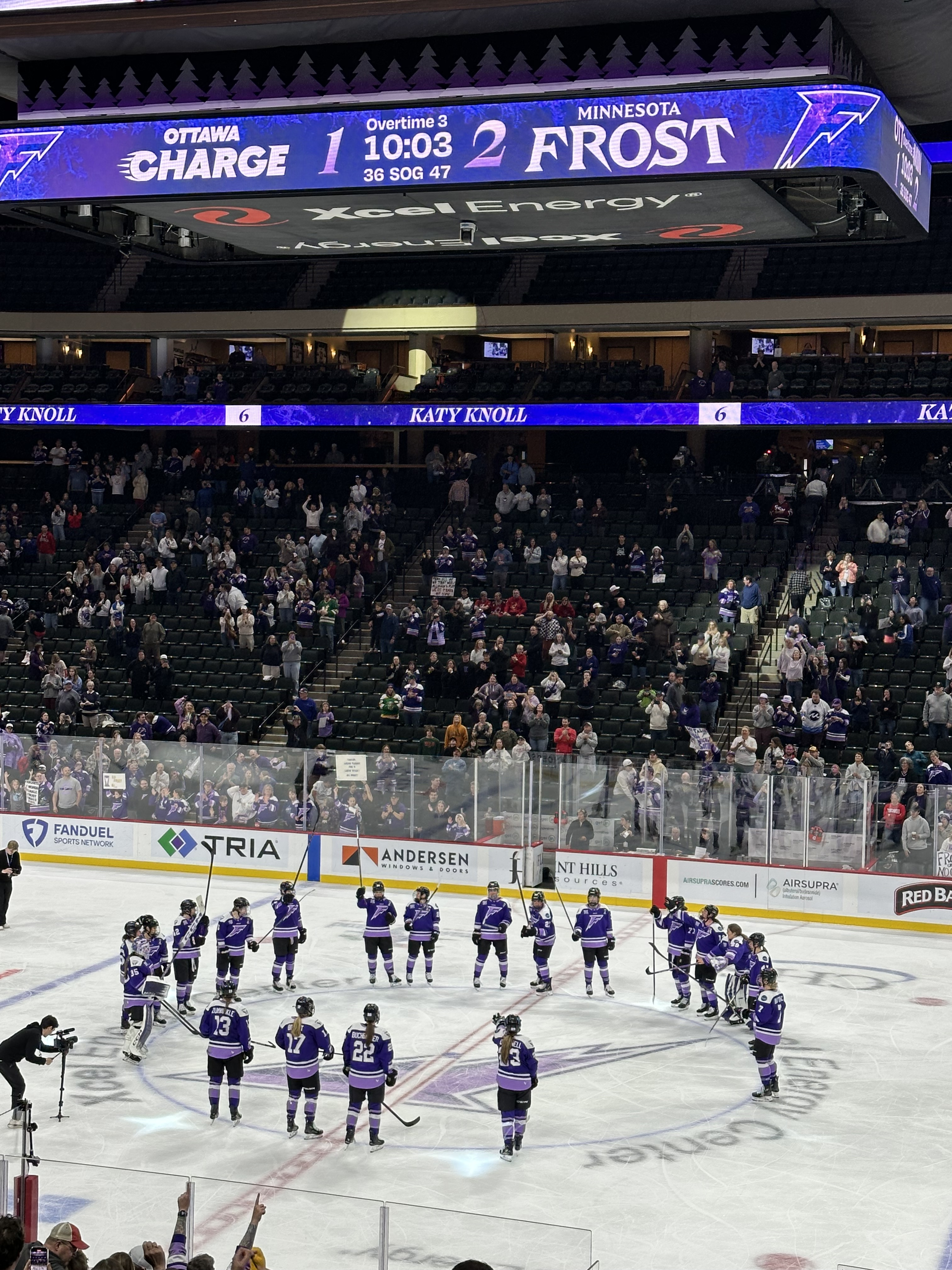
The Minnesota Frost gather around centre ice after winning game 3 of the 2025 PWHL Finals.

Scoring summary
Period	Team	Goal	Assist(s)	Time	Score
1st	OTT	Emily Clark (3)	Gabbie Hughes (3) and Ashton Bell (1)	11:38	1–0 OTT
2nd	MIN	Lee Stecklein (4)	Claire Thompson (5)	02:58	1–1
3rd	None				
OT	None				
2OT	None				
3OT	MIN	Katy Knoll (2)	Klára Hymlárová (3) and Sophie Jaques (5)	09:57	2–1 MIN

Penalty summary
Period	Team	Player	Penalty	Time	PIM
1st	OTT	Brianne Jenner	Holding the stick	14:49	2:00
2nd	MIN	Grace Zumwinkle	Roughing	08:06	2:00
3rd	MIN	Lee Stecklein	Holding	03:56	2:00
3rd	OTT	Jocelyne Larocque	Roughing	06:32	2:00
3rd	MIN	Liz Schepers	Cross-checking	09:17	2:00
OT	None				
2OT	OTT	Rebecca Leslie	Hooking	08:37	2:00
3OT	MIN	Claire Thompson	Cross-checking	06:51	2:00

Shots by period
Team	1	2	3	OT	2OT	3OT	Total
OTT	2	7	6	5	11	5	36
MIN	10	10	4	8	11	4	47

Power play opportunities
Team	Goals/Opportunities
Ottawa	0/4
Minnesota	0/3

Three star selections
	Team	Player	Statistics
1st	MIN	Katy Knoll	1 goal
2nd	MIN	Maddie Rooney	35 saves
3rd	OTT	Gwyneth Philips	45 saves

=== Game four ===
May 26	Ottawa Charge	1–2	OT	Minnesota Frost	Xcel Energy Center	Recap

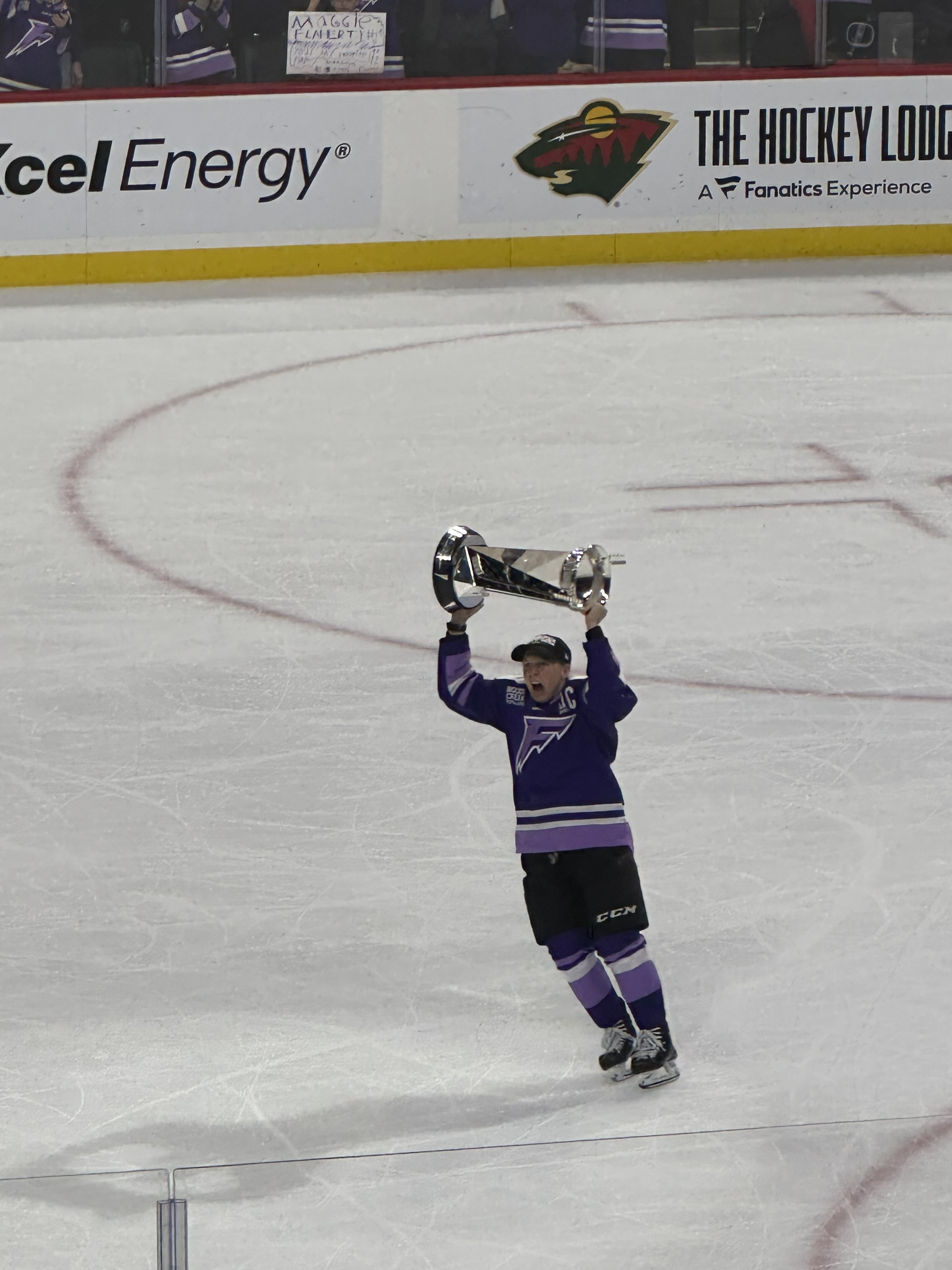
Kendall Coyne Schofield with Walter Cup 2025

After a scoreless first period, Minnesota's Kelly Pannek put the Frost on the board midway through the second, slotting a goal over the left shoulder of Ottawa goaltender Gwyneth Philips from close range, receiving a cross-ice feed from Claire Thompson. In the third period, the Charge staved off elimination with a goal from Tereza Vanišová, after Danielle Serdachny drove behind the Frost's net and centered the puck, giving Vanišová a chance which she capitalized on, tying the game 1–1 with just under ten minutes to play. In overtime, both teams had chances. 12 minutes into the extra period, Liz Schepers fired a shot from close range that found the net past Philips and secured the Minnesota Frost's second PWHL title in a row.

Scoring summary
Period	Team	Goal	Assist(s)	Time	Score
1st	None				
2nd	MIN	Kelly Pannek (2)	Claire Thompson (6) and Grace Zumwinkle (3)	10:10	1–0 MIN
3rd	OTT	Tereza Vanišová (1)	Danielle Serdachny (2) and Jocelyne Larocque (3)	10:09	1–1
OT	MIN	Liz Schepers (2)	Katy Knoll (3) and Klára Hymlárová (4)	12:00	2–1 MIN

Penalty summary
Period	Team	Player	Penalty	Time	PIM
1st	MIN	Dominique Petrie	Tripping	12:05	2:00
1st	OTT	Ronja Savolainen	Cross-checking	19:42	2:00
2nd	None				
3rd	None				
OT	OTT	Gabbie Hughes	Roughing	08:01	2:00
OT	MIN	Natalie Buchbinder	Roughing	08:01	2:00

Shots by period
Team	1	2	3	OT	Total
OTT	12	11	7	4	34
MIN	12	14	10	2	38

Power play opportunities
Team	Goals/Opportunities
Ottawa	0/1
Minnesota	0/1

Three star selections
	Team	Player	Statistics
1st	MIN	Liz Schepers	1 goal
2nd	MIN	Maddie Rooney	33 saves
3rd	MIN	Kelly Pannek	1 goal

== Team rosters ==
=== Minnesota Frost ===
No.	Nat	Player	Pos	S/G	Age	Acquired	Birthplace
8	(United States)	Charlotte Akervik	D	R	25	2024	Eau Claire, Wisconsin
9	(Canada)	Mae Batherson	D	L	25	2024	Garmisch-Partenkirchen, Germany
33	(Canada)	Marlène Boissonnault	G	L	29	2025	Dundee, New Brunswick
17	(United States)	Brooke Bryant	F	R	26	2023	Linden, California
22	(United States)	Natalie Buchbinder	D	R	27	2023	Fairport, New York
7	(United States)	Claire Butorac	F	R	27	2023	Andover, Minnesota
86	(Canada)	Michela Cava	F	R	32	2023	Thunder Bay, Ontario
23	(Canada)	Mellissa Channell-Watkins	D	L	31	2023	Oakville, Ontario
26	(United States)	Kendall Coyne Schofield (C)	F	L	34	2023	Palos Heights, Illinois
77	(United States)	Britta Curl-Salemme	F	L	26	2024	Bismarck, North Dakota
19	(United States)	Maggie Flaherty	D	L	26	2023	Lakeville, Minnesota
27	(United States)	Taylor Heise	F	R	26	2023	Lake City, Minnesota
29	(United States)	Nicole Hensley	G	L	32	2023	Littleton, Colorado
71	(Czech Republic)	Klára Hymlárová	F	L	27	2024	Opava, Czech Republic
16	(Canada)	Sophie Jaques	D	R	26	2024	Toronto, Ontario
6	(United States)	Katy Knoll	F	R	25	2024	Amherst, New York
41	(Czech Republic)	Denisa Křížová	F	L	32	2023	Horni Cerekev, Czechia
3	(Canada)	Brooke McQuigge	F	L	26	2024	Bowmanville, Ontario
11	(United States)	Kaitlyn O'Donohoe	F	R	25	2024	Atlanta, Georgia
12	(United States)	Kelly Pannek (A)	F	R	30	2023	Plymouth, Minnesota
14	(United States)	Dominique Petrie	F	R	25	2024	Hermosa Beach, California
35	(United States)	Maddie Rooney	G	L	29	2023	Andover, Minnesota
21	(United States)	Liz Schepers	F	L	27	2023	Mound, Minnesota
2	(United States)	Lee Stecklein (A)	D	L	32	2023	Roseville, Minnesota
42	(Canada)	Claire Thompson	D	L	28	2024	Toronto, Ontario
13	(United States)	Grace Zumwinkle	F	R	27	2023	Excelsior, Minnesota

=== Ottawa Charge ===
No.	Nat	Player	Pos	S/G	Age	Acquired	Birthplace
9	(Sweden)	Jessica Adolfsson	D	L	28	2024	Linköping, Sweden
35	(Canada)	Logan Angers	G	R	26	2024	Winnipeg, Manitoba
12	(Canada)	Victoria Bach	F	L	30	2024	Milton, Ontario
21	(Canada)	Ashton Bell	D	R	26	2023	Deloraine, Manitoba
3	(Canada)	Zoe Boyd	D	L	26	2023	Caledon East, Ontario
26	(Canada)	Emily Clark (A)	F	L	30	2023	Saskatoon, Saskatchewan
27	(United States)	Shiann Darkangelo (A)	F	L	32	2024	Royal Oak, Michigan
22	(United States)	Taylor House	F	L	28	2024	Joliet, Illinois
17	(United States)	Gabbie Hughes	F	L	27	2023	Lino Lakes, Minnesota
5	(Canada)	Samantha Isbell	F	L	28	2024	Thunder Bay, Ontario
19	(Canada)	Brianne Jenner (C)	F	R	35	2023	Oakville, Ontario
23	(Canada)	Jocelyne Larocque	D	L	38	2024	Ste. Anne, Manitoba
37	(Canada)	Rebecca Leslie	F	R	30	2024	Ottawa, Ontario
6	(Canada)	Stephanie Markowski	D	R	25	2024	Edmonton, Alberta
38	(Canada)	Emerance Maschmeyer	G	L	32	2023	Bruderheim, Alberta
18	(United States)	Mannon McMahon	F	R	25	2024	Maple Grove, Minnesota
94	(Austria)	Anna Meixner	F	L	32	2024	Zell am See, Austria
32	(United States)	Lucy Morgan	G	R	25	2024	Mandan, North Dakota
16	(Czech Republic)	Kateřina Mrázová	F	L	34	2023	Kolín, Czech and Slovak Federative Republic
33	(United States)	Gwyneth Philips	G	R	26	2024	Athens, Ohio
71	(United States)	Jincy Roese	D	L	29	2023	O'Fallon, Missouri
88	(Finland)	Ronja Savolainen	D	L	28	2024	Helsinki, Finland
92	(Canada)	Danielle Serdachny	F	R	25	2024	Edmonton, Alberta
8	(United States)	Natalie Snodgrass	F	R	27	2023	Eagan, Minnesota
2	(Czech Republic)	Aneta Tejralová	D	L	30	2023	Prague, Czechia
13	(Czech Republic)	Tereza Vanišová	F	L	30	2024	Strakonice, Czechia
10	(Canada)	Alexa Vasko	F	L	27	2024	St. Catharines, Ontario

== Media ==
In Canada, the series aired on TSN in English and RDS in French. In the U.S., the series was shown on FanDuel Sports Network North.
