= 2025 PWHL playoffs =

Women's hockey postseason tournament

Tournament details
- Dates: May 7 – May 26
- Teams: 4
- Defending champions: PWHL Minnesota

Final positions
- Champions: Minnesota Frost
- Runners-up: Ottawa Charge

Tournament statistics
- Scoring leader(s): Lee Stecklein (8 pts)

Awards
- MVP: Gwyneth Philips (Charge)

The 2025 PWHL playoffs was the playoff tournament of the Professional Women's Hockey League (PWHL) for the 2024–25 season. The playoffs began on May 7, 2025, and concluded with the PWHL Finals on May 26, 2025, with the Minnesota Frost winning their second consecutive Walter Cup.

The Montreal Victoire were the first team to make the playoffs, when they defeated the Minnesota Frost 4–1 on March 26. The Toronto Sceptres were the second team to qualify when the New York Sirens defeated the Frost on April 27.

It was the first time the Ottawa Charge made the playoffs. As a result, the City of Ottawa renamed a section of Bank Street "Charge Avenue" in honour of the team. The team qualified for the playoffs in their last game of the season, when Kateřina Mrázová scored in overtime for the Charge, who beat the Toronto Sceptres 2–1. The team needed a win of any kind to qualify.

The Minnesota Frost also clinched a playoff spot in their last game, after defeating the Boston Fleet 8–1, eliminating the Fleet in the process.

== Playoff bracket ==
By virtue of finishing first overall, the Montreal Victoire were able to select their first-round opponent between the fourth-place Minnesota Frost and the third-place Ottawa Charge. On May 4, Montreal announced their choice to play Ottawa, leaving the second-place Toronto Sceptres to play Minnesota in the other semi-final.

Semi-finals
May 7–14, Coca-Cola Coliseum and Xcel Energy Center
Toronto Sceptres	3	3	5	3*
Minnesota Frost	2	5	7	4*
May 8–16, Place Bell and TD Place Arena
Montreal Victoire	2	3****	0	1
Ottawa Charge	3	2****	1	2

PWHL Finals
May 20–26 TD Place Arena and Xcel Energy Center
Minnesota Frost	1*	2*	2***	2*
Ottawa Charge	2*	1*	1***	1*

* - Denotes overtime period(s)

=== Semi-finals ===
==== Montreal (1) vs. Ottawa (3) ====
Montreal finished first overall in the league, earning 53 points. Ottawa finished in 3rd place with 44 points. Montreal held a 3–1–0–2 record against Ottawa in the regular season, including winning all 3 games in Montreal's home arena, one in overtime.

In game one, Ottawa upset Montreal 3–2 thanks to goals by Brianne Jenner, Ashton Bell and Shiann Darkangelo. With the loss, Montreal extended their four game playoff winless streak, which includes three straight losses to PWHL Boston in the 2024 playoffs. For Ottawa, it was their fourth win in their previous five games.

In game two, Montreal evened the series with a 3–2 marathon victory. The game was won at 15:33 in fourth overtime period, and took a total of 5 1/2 hours, setting a PWHL record for longest overtime in league history. Ann-Renée Desbiens made 63 saves in the contest, breaking a PWHL record for the most saves in a game, previously set by Aerin Frankel with 56 saves. With Montreal up 2–0, Ottawa rallied late in the third to tie the game up thanks to goals by Aneta Tejralová at 4:34 and Brianne Jenner with 41 seconds left in regulation. After almost four additional periods of overtime, Montreal's Catherine Dubois scored the winning goal to tie the series. The win was Montreal's first playoff victory in franchise history.

Game three would be Ottawa's first home playoff game in franchise history. The game was scoreless until the 8:42 mark of the third period when Ottawa's Mannon McMahon scored the game's only goal, giving the Charge the victory, and a 2–1 series lead. Gwyneth Philips recorded the shutout, saving all 26 of Montreal's shots.

The Charge closed out the series in game four, defeating Montreal 2–1 thanks to goals by Rebecca Leslie and Emily Clark. Leslie scored just two minutes into the game, while Clark scored just 31 seconds into the third. Montreal ruined Gwyneth Philips's chance at a second straight shutout when Maureen Murphy scored with just over five minutes to go in the game.

May 8	Ottawa Charge	3–2	Montreal Victoire	Place Bell	Recap
Brianne Jenner (1) – pp – 04:54		First period	12:13 – pp – Maureen Murphy (1)
Ashton Bell (1) – 05:07		Second period	07:12 – pp – Marie-Philip Poulin (1)
Shiann Darkangelo (1) – 09:17		Third period	No scoring
Gwyneth Philips 31 saves / 33 shots		Goalie stats	Ann-Renée Desbiens 24 saves / 27 shots

May 11	Ottawa Charge	2–3	4OT	Montreal Victoire	Place Bell	Recap
No scoring		First period		02:25 – Kristin O'Neill (1)
No scoring		Second period		08:35 – Laura Stacey (1)
Aneta Tejralová (1) – 15:26; Brianne Jenner (2) – 19:18		Third period		No scoring
No scoring		Fourth overtime period		15:33 – Catherine Dubois (1)
Gwyneth Philips 53 saves / 56 shots		Goalie stats		Ann-Renée Desbiens 63 saves / 65 shots

May 13	Montreal Victoire	0–1	Ottawa Charge	TD Place Arena	Recap
No scoring		First period	No scoring
No scoring		Second period	No scoring
No scoring		Third period	08:42 – Mannon McMahon (1)
Ann-Renée Desbiens 24 saves / 25 shots		Goalie stats	Gwyneth Philips 26 saves / 26 shots

May 16	Montreal Victoire	1–2	Ottawa Charge	TD Place Arena	Recap
No scoring		First period	02:00 – Rebecca Leslie (1)
No scoring		Second period	No scoring
Maureen Murphy (2) – 14:58		Third period	00:31 – Emily Clark (1)
Ann-Renée Desbiens 21 saves / 23 shots		Goalie stats	Gwyneth Philips 19 saves / 20 shots

Ottawa wins 3–1

==== Toronto (2) vs. Minnesota (4) ====
Toronto finished in second place in the league, earning 48 points in the standings. Minnesota finished in 4th place with 44 points. Minnesota finished behind Ottawa due to their lower number of regulation wins. Toronto lost the season series to Minnesota, holding a 1–1–2–2 record. This was the second time the two teams met in the playoffs, the first being in the 2024 semifinals, where Minnesota won 3 games to 2. In game one, Julia Gosling scored twice in her playoff debut in her 3–2 win, giving Toronto a 1–0 series lead. In game two, Lee Stecklein recorded 3 points in a 5–3 victory for Minnesota to tie the series. Brooke McQuigge and Michela Cava each scored twice as Minnesota took game three by a score of 7–5; the highest scoring game in PWHL history. In game four, Kendall Coyne Schofield scored two goals, and Taylor Heise netted the game-winning goal in overtime to send Minnesota to their second straight Walter Cup Finals.

May 7	Minnesota Frost	2–3	Toronto Sceptres	Coca-Cola Coliseum	Recap
No scoring		First period	11:59 – Blayre Turnbull (1)
Britta Curl-Salemme (1) – pp – 13:56		Second period	07:47 – Julia Gosling (1); 09:42 – pp – Julia Gosling (2)
Katy Knoll (1) – 2:33		Third period	No scoring
Nicole Hensley 34 saves / 37 shots		Goalie stats	Kristen Campbell 24 saves / 26 shots

May 9	Minnesota Frost	5–3	Toronto Sceptres	Coca-Cola Coliseum	Recap
No scoring		First period	07:11 – Hayley Scamurra (1)
Lee Stecklein (1) – 04:41; Michela Cava (1) – 10:57; Lee Stecklein (2) – pp – 12:59		Second period	16:56 – pp – Savannah Harmon (1); 17:23 – Allie Munroe (1)
Sophie Jaques (1) – 13:47; Mellissa Channell-Watkins (1) – pp – 18:49		Third period	No scoring
Maddie Rooney 27 saves / 30 shots		Goalie stats	Kristen Campbell 20 saves / 25 shots

May 11	Toronto Sceptres	5–7	Minnesota Frost	Xcel Energy Center	Recap
Daryl Watts (1) – 14:58		First period	02:33 – Liz Schepers (1); 06:56 – Brooke McQuigge (1); 07:48 – Lee Stecklein (3)
Maggie Connors (1) – 02:28; Kali Flanagan (1) – 17:57		Second period	08:20 – pp – Brooke McQuigge (2); 17:35 – Sophie Jaques (2)
Anna Kjellbin (1) – 05:47; Blayre Turnbull (2) – 12:04		Third period	07:20 – Michela Cava (2); 09:21 – pp – Michela Cava (3)
Kristen Campbell 17 saves / 24 shots		Goalie stats	Maddie Rooney 18 saves / 23 shots

May 14	Toronto Sceptres	3–4	OT	Minnesota Frost	Xcel Energy Center	Recap
Julia Gosling (3) – 05:28		First period		No scoring
Hannah Miller (1) – 10:33		Second period		10:47 – Kendall Coyne Schofield (1); 18:48 – Kelly Pannek (1)
Emma Maltais (1) – 00:58		Third period		08:33 – Kendall Coyne Schofield (2)
No scoring		First overtime period		16:00 – Taylor Heise (1)
Carly Jackson 22 saves / 26 shots		Goalie stats		Nicole Hensley 26 saves / 29 shots

Minnesota wins 3–1

=== Finals ===
==== Ottawa (3) vs. Minnesota (4) ====
May 20	Minnesota Frost	1–2	OT	Ottawa Charge	TD Place Arena	Recap
No scoring		First period		No scoring
No scoring		Second period		11:34 – Rebecca Leslie (3)
Klára Hymlárová (1) – 05:24		Third period		No scoring
No scoring		First overtime period		02:47 – Emily Clark (2)
Nicole Hensley 17 saves / 19 shots		Goalie stats		Gwyneth Philips 25 saves / 26 shots

May 22	Minnesota Frost	2–1	OT	Ottawa Charge	TD Place Arena	Recap
No scoring		First period		No scoring
No scoring		Second period		No scoring
Britta Curl-Salemme (2) – pp – 19:44		Third period		17:25 – Jocelyne Larocque (1)
Britta Curl-Salemme (3) – 16:24		First overtime period		No scoring
Maddie Rooney 37 saves / 38 shots		Goalie stats		Gwyneth Philips 22 saves / 24 shots

May 24	Ottawa Charge	1–2	3OT	Minnesota Frost	Xcel Energy Center	Recap
Emily Clark (3) – 11:38		First period		No scoring
No scoring		Second period		02:58 – Lee Stecklein (4)
No scoring		Third period		No scoring
No scoring		Third overtime period		09:56 – Katy Knoll (2)
Gwyneth Philips 45 saves / 47 shots		Goalie stats		Maddie Rooney 35 saves / 36 shots

May 26	Ottawa Charge	1–2	OT	Minnesota Frost	Xcel Energy Center	Recap
No scoring		First period		No scoring
No scoring		Second period		10:10 – Kelly Pannek (2)
Tereza Vanišová (1) – 10:09		Third period		No scoring
No scoring		First overtime period		12:00 – Liz Schepers (2)
Gwyneth Philips 36 saves / 38 shots		Goalie stats		Maddie Rooney 33 saves / 34 shots

Minnesota wins 3–1

=== Player statistics ===
==== Scoring leaders ====
At the conclusion of the playoffs

Player	Team	GP	G	A	Pts	+/–	PIM
Lee Stecklein	Minnesota Frost	8	4	4	8	+1	2
Sophie Jaques	Minnesota Frost	8	2	5	7	+1	0
Taylor Heise	Minnesota Frost	8	1	6	7	-1	2
Claire Thompson	Minnesota Frost	8	0	6	6	+2	4
Emily Clark	Ottawa Charge	8	3	2	5	+3	2
Michela Cava	Minnesota Frost	8	3	2	5	-3	4
Katy Knoll	Minnesota Frost	8	2	3	5	+2	0
Kelly Pannek	Minnesota Frost	8	2	3	5	+1	2
Mellissa Channell-Watkins	Minnesota Frost	8	1	4	5	+5	0
Klára Hymlárová	Minnesota Frost	8	1	4	5	+1	0

==== Leading goaltenders ====
At the conclusion of the playoffs

Player	Team	GP	TOI	W	L	OTL	GA	SO	SV%	GAA
Gwyneth Philips	Ottawa Charge	8	635:25	4	0	4	13	1	.952	1.23
Ann-Renée Desbiens	Montreal Victoire	4	310:38	1	3	0	8	0	.943	1.55
Maddie Rooney	Minnesota Frost	5	376:32	5	0	0	11	0	.932	1.75
Nicole Hensley	Minnesota Frost	3	197:12	1	1	1	8	0	.906	2.43
Carly Jackson	Toronto Sceptres	1	76:00	0	0	1	4	0	.846	3.16

=== Attendance ===
Playoff attendance
Home team	Home games	Average attendance	Total attendance
Ottawa	4	7,421	29,683
Toronto	2	7,264	14,527
Montreal	2	6,842	13,684
Minnesota	4	6,357	25,426
League	12	6,943	83,320

== Media ==
The Ottawa–Montreal semifinal series and the final aired on TSN in English and RDS in French, while the Toronto–Minnesota semifinal series aired on Amazon Prime. The Toronto–Minnesota series was also on the FanDuel Sports Network North and on YouTube in the U.S.
