= Katy Knoll =

American ice hockey player (born 2001)

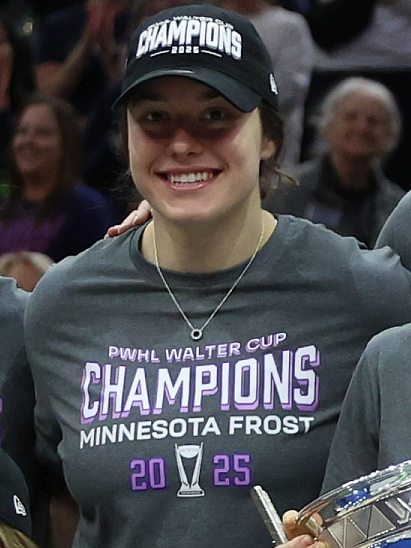
- Knoll in 2025
- Born: January 16, 2001 (age 25) Amherst, New York, U.S.
- Height: 5 ft 7 in (170 cm)
- Weight: 160 lb (73 kg; 11 st 6 lb)
- Position: Forward
- Shoots: Right
- PWHL team Former teams: Vegas Vanguards; Minnesota Frost
- Playing career: 2019–present

Katelyn Joyce Knoll (born January 16, 2001) is an American professional ice hockey forward for the Vegas Vanguards of the Professional Women's Hockey League (PWHL). She previously played for the Minnesota Frost of the PWHL. She played college ice hockey at Northeastern.

== Early life ==
Knoll attended Nichols School in Buffalo, New York, where she played ice hockey, tennis and golf. She was named the Buffalo News Prep Talk Player of the Year in 2017.

== Playing career ==
=== College ===
Knoll began her collegiate hockey career at Northeastern during the 2019–20 season. In her freshman year, she recorded ten goals and 16 assists in 38 games, and led all Huskies rookies with 26 points. During the 2020–21 season, in her sophomore year, she recorded 12 goals and ten assists in 25 games, in a season that was shortened due to the COVID-19 pandemic. During the 2021–22 season, in her junior year, she recorded ten goals and 11 assists in 37 games. During the 2022–23 season, in her senior year, she recorded 18 goals and 16 assists in 38 games. During the 2023–24 season, in her graduate student year, she recorded 11 goals and 17 assists in 39 games. She finished her collegiate career with 61 goals and 70 assists in 177 games.

=== Professional ===
On June 10, 2024, Knoll was drafted in the seventh round, 39th overall, by PWHL Minnesota in the 2024 PWHL Draft. In November 2024, following pre-season mini camp, she signed a one-year contract with the Minnesota Frost. During the 2024–25 season, she recorded one goal and one assist in 21 games. During the 2025 PWHL playoffs she recorded two goals and three assists in eight games. During game three of the 2025 PWHL Finals against the Ottawa Charge, she scored the game-winning goal in triple-overtime, to put the Frost one win away from their second consecutive Walter Cup.

On June 27, 2025, she signed a one-year contract extension with the Frost. During the 2025–26 season, she recorded seven goals and two assists in 30 regular season games and one goal in five games during the 2026 Walter Cup playoffs.

During the league's expansion to 12 teams ahead of the 2026–27 season, she signed a two-year contract with the Vegas Vanguards on June 15, 2026.

== International play ==
Medal record

Representing United States

Ice hockey

World U18 Championships
Gold medal – first place	2018 Russia	
Silver medal – second place	2019 Japan	

Knoll represented the United States at the 2018 IIHF World Women's U18 Championship where she recorded two goals in five games and won a gold medal. She again represented the United States at the 2019 IIHF World Women's U18 Championship, where she recorded three goals and two assists in five games and won a silver medal.

== Personal life ==
Knoll was born to Dan and Sue Knoll, and has a brother, Dan, and a sister, Kristen.

== Career statistics ==
=== Regular season and playoffs ===
Note: GP = Games played; G = Goals; A = Assists; Pts = Points; PIM = Penalty minutes;

			Regular season					Playoffs
Season	Team	League	GP	G	A	Pts	PIM	GP	G	A	Pts	PIM
2019–20	Northeastern University	HE	38	10	16	26	37	—	—	—	—	—
2020–21	Northeastern University	HE	25	12	10	22	14	—	—	—	—	—
2021–22	Northeastern University	HE	37	10	11	21	39	—	—	—	—	—
2022–23	Northeastern University	HE	38	18	16	34	21	—	—	—	—	—
2023–24	Northeastern University	HE	39	11	17	28	16	—	—	—	—	—
2024–25	Minnesota Frost	PWHL	21	1	1	2	6	8	2	3	5	0
2025–26	Minnesota Frost	PWHL	30	7	2	9	18	5	1	0	1	0
PWHL totals			51	8	3	11	24	13	3	3	6	0

=== International ===
Year	Team	Event	Result	GP	G	A	Pts	PIM
2018	United States	U18	1st place, gold medalist(s)	5	2	0	2	2
2019	United States	U18	2nd place, silver medalist(s)	5	3	2	5	10
Junior totals				10	5	2	7	12

== Awards and honors ==
Honors	Year
PWHL
Walter Cup Champion	2025
