= Emily Clark (ice hockey) =

Canadian ice hockey player (born 1995)

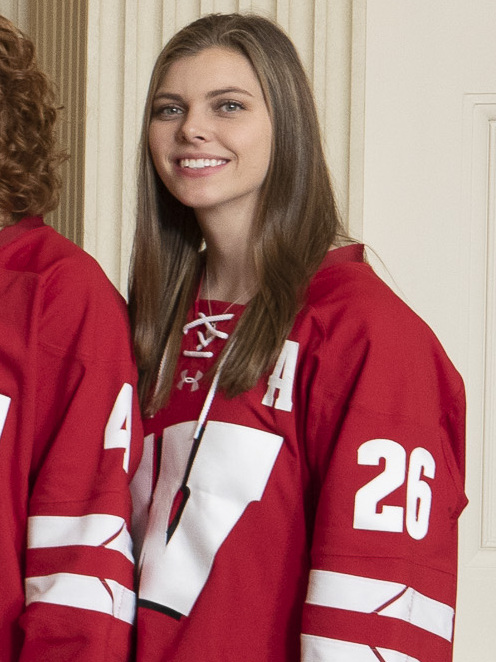
- Clark in 2019
- Born: November 28, 1995 (age 30) Saskatoon, Saskatchewan, Canada
- Height: 5 ft 7 in (170 cm)
- Weight: 134 lb (61 kg; 9 st 8 lb)
- Position: Forward
- Shoots: Left
- PWHL team Former teams: Hamilton Havoc; Wisconsin Badgers Ottawa Charge
- National team: Canada
- Playing career: 2014–present
Medal record
Women's ice hockey
Representing Canada
Olympic Games
Gold medal – first place	2022 Beijing	Team
Silver medal – second place	2018 Pyeongchang	Team
Silver medal – second place	2026 Milano Cortina	Team
World Championships
Gold medal – first place	2021 Canada
Gold medal – first place	2022 Denmark
Gold medal – first place	2024 United States
Silver medal – second place	2015 Sweden
Silver medal – second place	2016 Canada
Silver medal – second place	2017 United States
Silver medal – second place	2023 Canada
Silver medal – second place	2025 Czechia
Silver medal – second place	2026 Denmark
Bronze medal – third place	2019 Finland
World U18 Championships
Gold medal – first place	2013 Finland
Gold medal – first place	2012 Czech Republic

Emily Clark (born November 28, 1995) is a Canadian professional ice hockey player for the Hamilton Havoc of the Professional Women's Hockey League. Clark has competed for Team Canada at the junior and senior level, beginning in 2011. She made her senior debut with Canada at the 2014 4 Nations Cup. She went on to compete with the Canadian national team at the 2018 Winter Olympics, where she helped Canada win a silver medal, and the 2022 Winter Olympics, where she helped Canada win gold. Clark played college ice hockey for four seasons at Wisconsin. Before signing in the PWHL, Clark was a member of the Professional Women's Hockey Players Association (PWHPA).

== Early life ==
Clark was born in Saskatoon, Saskatchewan, on November 28, 1995. She was the youngest of six children, all of whom played hockey, and her father served as a local coach.

== Playing career ==
=== Early years ===
During the 2010–11 season, Clark was the alternate captain for the Saskatoon Stars as they reached the Saskatchewan Female Midget AAA Hockey League championship game for the second consecutive season. In addition, she won a gold medal at Mac's Tournament with the Stars. She was part of Team Saskatchewan at the 2011 Canada Winter Games. In 2009–10, Clark won the Tier 2 Saskatoon city championship with the Saskatoon Flyers.

=== College ===
In her NCAA debut with the Wisconsin Badgers on October 3, 2014, Clark registered two goals and three points in a 4–1 win against the Minnesota-Duluth Bulldogs.

In December 2016, Clark tied for the WCHA lead in both points scored with eight and assists with seven, while leading the conference in plus/minus rating with a +7 rating. She would record an assist in Wisconsin's 8–2 win against their archrivals, the Minnesota Golden Gophers, on December 4, 2016. On December 9, against the Ohio State Buckeyes, she established a career-high for most points in a game with five, compiling a goal and four assists in a 7–0 triumph. In each game contested in December, she logged at least one point. For her efforts, she was recognized as the WCHA Player of the Month.

=== PWHPA ===
After college, Clark expected to play professionally in the Canadian Women's Hockey League (CWHL), but the league abruptly discontinued operations before her graduation. She joined the Professional Women's Hockey Players Association (PWHPA) in boycotting the National Women's Hockey League or any other professional North American women's hockey league until a more sustainable model was developed.

Clark helped lead Team Harvey's to the PWHPA Secret Cup championship in 2023. In the final, Clark recorded a hat-trick and four points overall, and was named the game's first star.

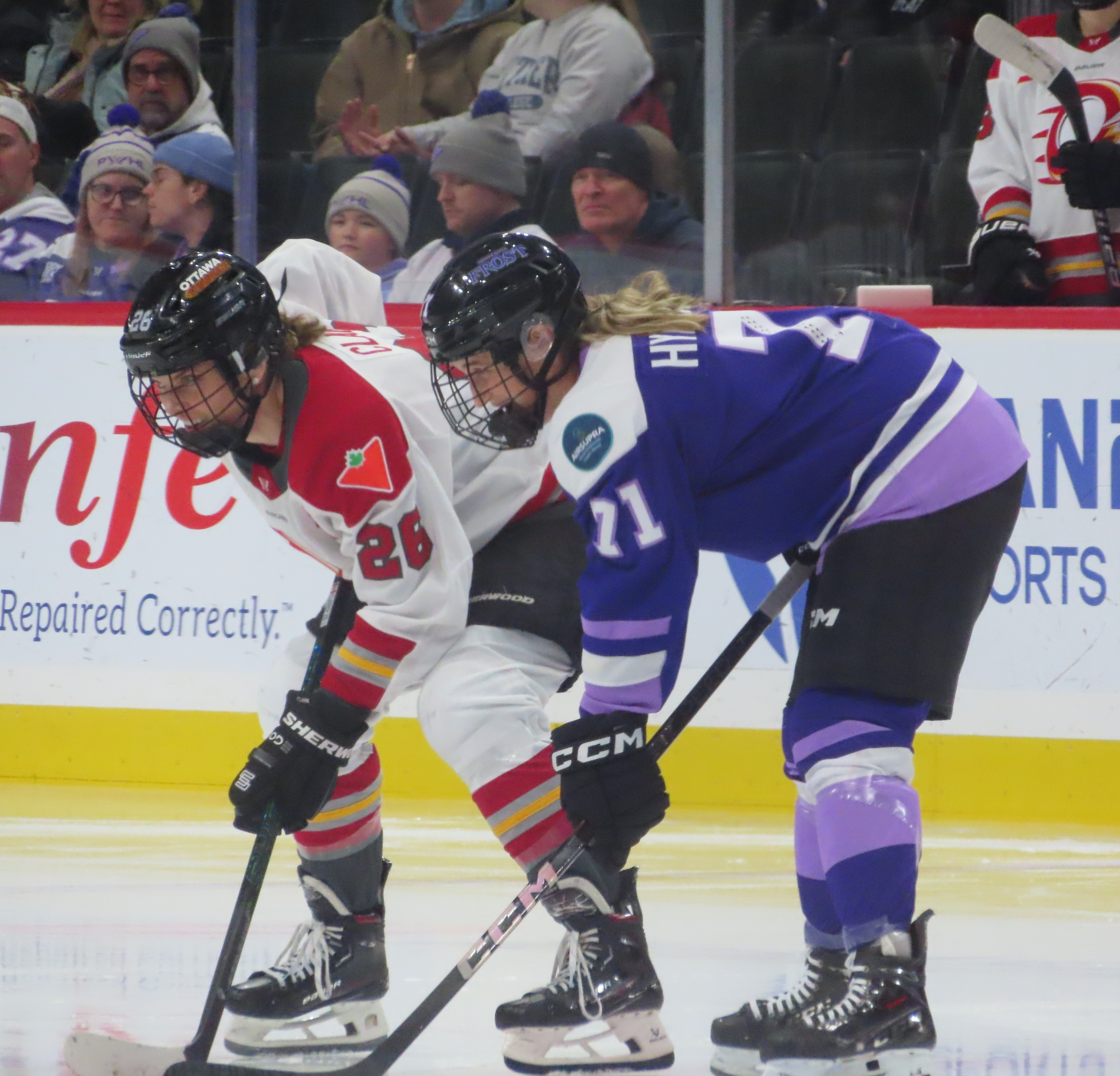
Clark (left) with the Ottawa Charge in 2025

=== PWHL ===
Following the PWHPA and the rival Premier Hockey Federation consolidating into the new Professional Women's Hockey League in 2023, Clark was one of the first three player signings announced when she signed with PWHL Ottawa, along with Team Canada teammates Brianne Jenner and Emerance Maschmeyer. Ahead of Ottawa's first game on January 2, 2024, Clark was named one of the team's assistant captains. Clark scored her first PWHL goal on January 23 in a 3–1 win over Toronto.

During the 2024–25 season, she recorded nine goals and ten assists in 30 regular season games. During the 2025 PWHL playoffs, she recorded three goals and two assists in eight games. On August 7, 2025, she signed a two-year contract extension with the Charge. During the 2025–26 season, she recorded three goals and six assists in 30 regular season games, and was scoreless in eight games during the 2026 Walter Cup playoffs.

During the league's expansion to 12 teams ahead of the 2026–27 season, she was left unprotected by the Charge and signed a two-year contract with the Hamilton Havoc on June 7, 2026.

== International play ==
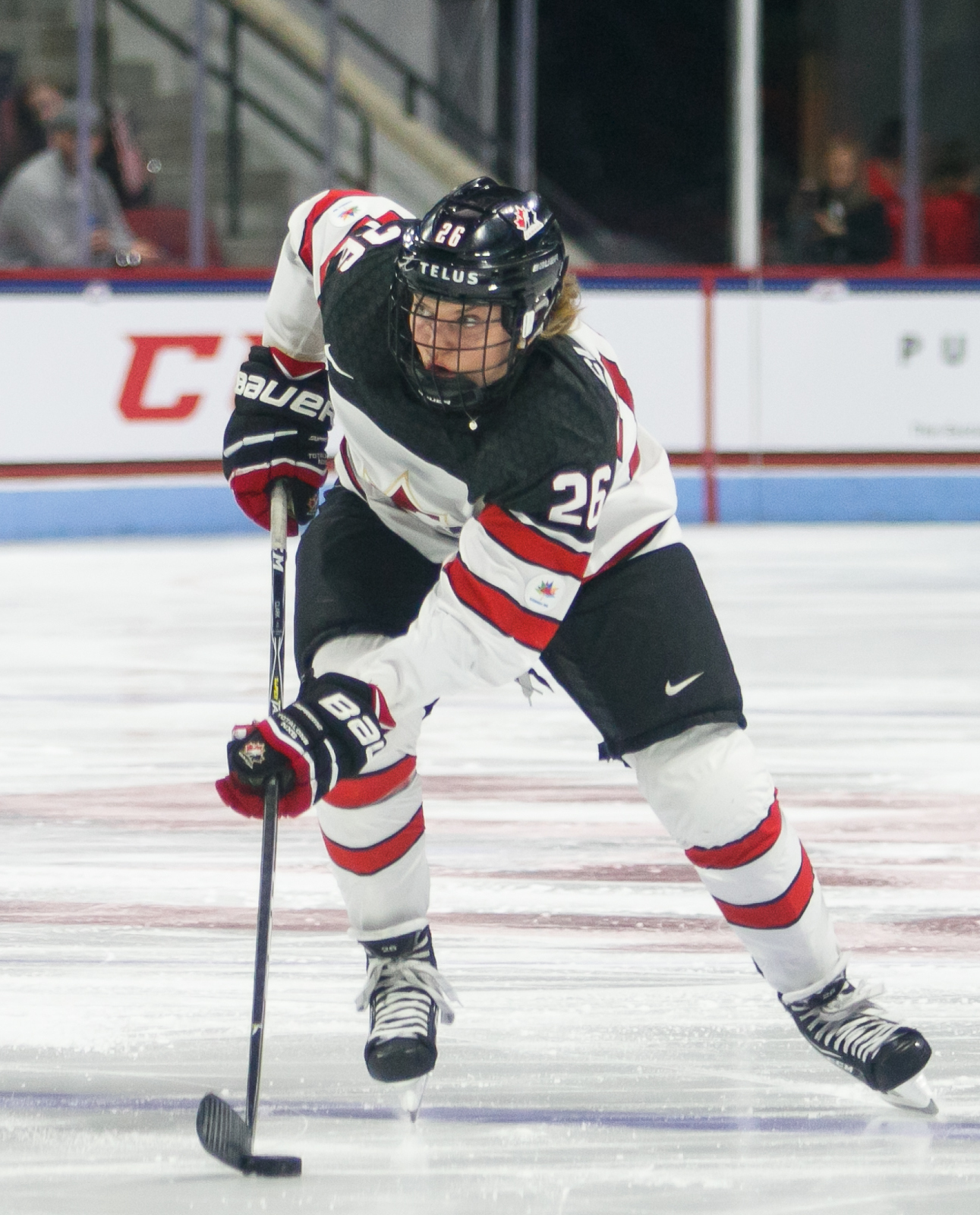
Clark with Team Canada in 2017

In August 2011, Clark competed with the Under 18 Canadian National Women's Ice Hockey Team in a three-game series versus the United States. In the third game of the series, Clark scored a goal, and Canada won the series. In addition, she was the youngest player on the team, and one of only three women from Saskatchewan invited to try out for the team.

Clark was selected to compete for Team Canada in the 2018 Winter Olympics in PyeongChang, South Korea. Clark recorded her first Olympic goal in the semi-finals against the Olympic athletes from Russia, which Canada won 5–0. She helped Team Canada take home a silver medal in a shootout against the United States.

On January 11, 2022, Clark was named to Canada's 2022 Olympic team. She won gold with the team which defeated United States 3–2 in the final, saying of the game "The whole day, the whole game, felt like a dream. I've never felt that way in a championship game. It kind of felt like the stars aligned."

On January 9, 2026, she was named to Canada's roster to compete at the 2026 Winter Olympics. Speaking about representing Saskatchewan on the national team, she said "To be able to represent our province on that team means a lot to me, and something I definitely don't take for granted." In the final game of preliminary round play of Group A, Clark scored twice as Canada beat Finland by a 5-0 mark. She was part of the squad which won the silver medal, following a 2-1 loss against the United States in the final on February 19, 2026.

== Career statistics ==
Career statistics are from USCHO.com, or Eliteprospects.com or the Team Canada Media Guide for 2023.

=== Regular season and playoffs ===
			Regular season					Playoffs
Season	Team	League	GP	G	A	Pts	PIM	GP	G	A	Pts	PIM
2009–10	Saskatoon Stars	SFMAAAHL	28	2	2	4	6	10	0	0	0	10
2010–11	Saskatoon Stars	SFMAAAHL	28	17	10	27	24	9	5	3	8	4
2011–12	Saskatoon Stars	SFMAAAHL	26	26	34	60	36	9	13	7	20	10
2012–13	Okanagan HA U18 Prep	JWHL	29	15	23	38	36	—	—	—	—	—
2013–14	Okanagan HA U18 Prep	JWHL	28	19	12	31	12	—	—	—	—	—
2014–15	Univ. of Wisconsin	WCHA	30	10	14	24	18	6	2	1	3	0
2015–16	Univ. of Wisconsin	WCHA	32	20	18	38	14	6	4	3	7	4
2016–17	Univ. of Wisconsin	WCHA	32	15	21	36	26	7	5	5	10	10
2018–19	Univ. of Wisconsin	WCHA	27	13	10	23	8	7	1	4	5	4
2019–20	Montreal	PWHPA	—	—	—	—	—	—	—	—	—	—
2020–21	Montreal	PWHPA	4	0	2	2	4	—	—	—	—	—
2022–23	Team Harvey's	PWHPA	18	6	11	17	2	2	4	2	6	0
2023–24	PWHL Ottawa	PWHL	24	4	11	15	10	—	—	—	—	—
2024–25	Ottawa Charge	PWHL	30	9	10	19	10	8	3	2	5	2
2025–26	Ottawa Charge	PWHL	30	3	6	9	4	8	0	0	0	4
PWHPA totals			22	6	13	19	6	2	4	2	6	0
PWHL totals			84	16	27	43	24	16	3	2	5	6

=== International ===
Year	Team	Event	Result	GP	G	A	Pts	PIM
2012	Canada	U18	1st place, gold medalist(s)	5	2	2	4	2
2013	Canada	U18	1st place, gold medalist(s)	5	1	4	5	6
2014	Canada	4 Nations Cup	1st place, gold medalist(s)	4	0	0	0	0
2015	Canada	WC	2nd place, silver medalist(s)	5	1	1	2	0
2015	Canada	4 Nations Cup	2nd place, silver medalist(s)	4	0	1	1	6
2016	Canada	WC	2nd place, silver medalist(s)	5	1	0	1	4
2017	Canada	NWDT Nations	2nd place, silver medalist(s)	5	0	3	3	6
2017	Canada	WC	2nd place, silver medalist(s)	5	2	0	2	2
2017	Canada	4 Nations	2nd place, silver medalist(s)	4	0	1	1	4
2018	Canada	OG	2nd place, silver medalist(s)	5	1	0	1	4
2019	Canada	WC	3rd place, bronze medalist(s)	7	2	0	2	4
2021	Canada	WC	1st place, gold medalist(s)	7	1	2	3	4
2022	Canada	OG	1st place, gold medalist(s)	7	2	1	3	4
2022	Canada	WC	1st place, gold medalist(s)	7	2	2	4	0
2024	Canada	WC	1st place, gold medalist(s)	7	2	1	3	2
2025	Canada	WC	2nd place, silver medalist(s)	7	2	3	5	0
2026	Canada	OG	2nd place, silver medalist(s)	7	2	1	3	0
Junior totals				10	3	6	9	8
Senior totals				86	18	13	31	34

== Awards and honours ==
- WCHA Rookie of the Week (Week of October 7, 2014)
- WCHA Offensive Player of the Week (Week of February 3, 2015)
- WCHA Player of the Month (December 2016)

== Personal life ==
Clark is a member of the LGBT community. She is engaged to her partner, Jaime Bourbonnais, who is her teammate on the Canadian national team and a player for the New York Sirens.
