= Liz Schepers =

American ice hockey player (born 1999)

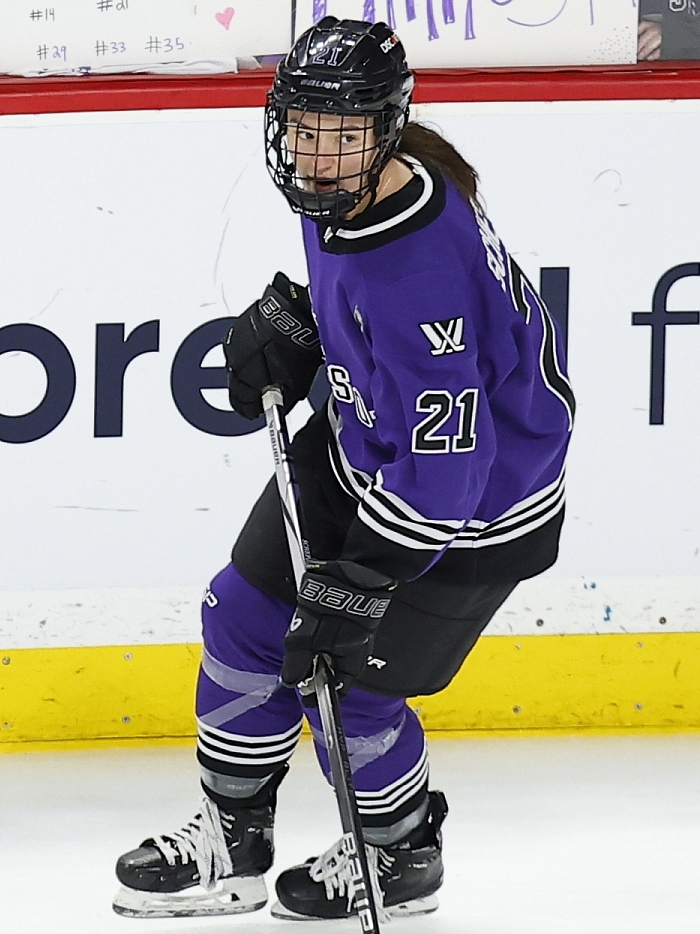
- Schepers with PWHL Minnesota in 2024
- Born: February 13, 1999 (age 27) Mound, Minnesota, U.S.
- Height: 5 ft 7 in (170 cm)
- Position: Forward
- Shoots: Left
- PWHL team Former teams: Boston Fleet; Minnesota Frost; Minnesota Whitecaps
- Playing career: 2017–present

Elizabeth Schepers (born February 13, 1999) is an American professional ice hockey forward for the Boston Fleet of the Professional Women's Hockey League (PWHL). She previously played for the Minnesota Frost of the PWHL and Minnesota Whitecaps of the Premier Hockey Federation (PHF). She played college ice hockey at Ohio State.

== College career ==
Schepers began her collegiate career for the Ohio State Buckeyes during the 2017–18 season. During her freshman year, she recorded seven goals and nine assists in 39 games. During the 2018–19 season in her sophomore year, she appeared in all 35 games and recorded seven goals and eight assists. During the 2019–20 season in her junior year, she appeared in 38 games and recorded 22 goals and 28 assists. She scored a conference-high six game-winning-goals to tie a program single-season record. During the 2020–21 season in her senior year, she appeared in all 20 games and recorded six goals and nine assists in a season that was shortened due to the COVID-19 pandemic. She finished the season tied for third on the team in points and second in goals.

During the 2021–22 season in her graduate year, she appeared in all 38 games and recorded 21 goals and 22 assists. She ranked second on the team in goals and third in points. On February 8, 2022, she recorded four goals in a game against St. Cloud State. She became the fourth player in program history to score four goals in a game. She helped lead Ohio State to their first national championship in program history. She finished her collegiate career at Ohio State with 63 goals and 74 assists in 170 games. She is Ohio State's career leader in postseason assists (12) and points (18) and career games played (170).

== Professional career ==
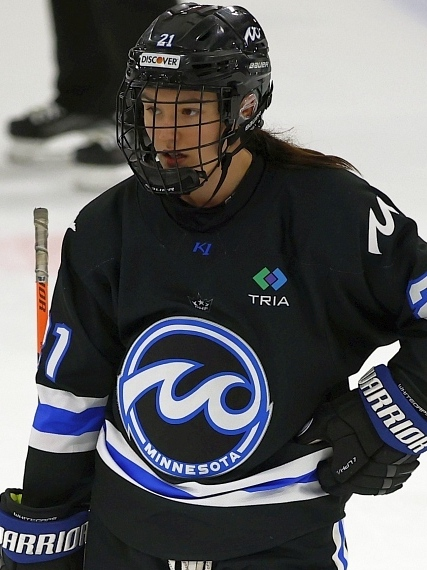
Schepers with the Minnesota Whitecaps in 2023

On July 11, 2022, she signed with the Minnesota Whitecaps of the Premier Hockey Federation (PHF). During the 2022–23 season, she recorded six goals and eight assists in 22 regular season games. On May 30, 2023, she signed a two-year contract extension with the Whitecaps.

On September 18, 2023, Schepers was drafted 73rd overall by PWHL Minnesota in the 2023 PWHL Draft. On November 30, 2023, she signed a one-year contract with Minnesota. During the 2023–24 season, she recorded three assists in 19 regular season games. During the Walter Cup playoffs she recorded one goal and four assists in ten games. During game five of the Walter Cup finals against PWHL Boston, she scored the game-winning goal and helped Minnesota win the inaugural Walter Cup. This was her first career PWHL goal.

On June 21, 2024, Minnesota re-signed Schepers to a one-year contract for the 2024–25 season. During the season she recorded two goals and four assists in 27 regular season games. During the 2025 PWHL playoffs, she recorded two goals and one assist in eight games. During game four of the 2025 PWHL Finals against the Ottawa Charge, she again scored the game-winning overtime goal to help the Frost win their second consecutive Walter Cup championship.

On June 18, 2025, Schepers signed a two-year contract with the Boston Fleet.

== Personal life ==
She is a member of the LGBTQ community, and owns a Goldendoodle named Rookie with her girlfriend.

Her grandfather Murray Oliver played ice hockey for the Boston Bruins from 1960-67. Oliver also played for the Detroit Red Wings, Toronto Maple Leafs and Minnesota North Stars. In 1982–83, he was the head coach for the Minnesota North Stars.

== Career statistics ==
Note: GP = Games played; G = Goals; A = Assists; Pts = Points; PIM = Penalty minutes;

			Regular season					Playoffs
Season	Team	League	GP	G	A	Pts	PIM	GP	G	A	Pts	PIM
2017–18	Ohio State University	WCHA	39	7	9	16	14	—	—	—	—	—
2018–19	Ohio State University	WCHA	35	7	8	15	10	—	—	—	—	—
2019–20	Ohio State University	WCHA	38	22	21	43	22	—	—	—	—	—
2020–21	Ohio State University	WCHA	20	6	9	15	14	—	—	—	—	—
2021–22	Ohio State University	WCHA	38	21	27	48	20	—	—	—	—	—
2022–23	Minnesota Whitecaps	PHF	22	6	8	14	0	3	0	3	3	2
2023–24	PWHL Minnesota	PWHL	19	0	3	3	8	10	1	4	5	2
2024–25	Minnesota Frost	PWHL	27	2	4	6	0	8	2	1	3	2
PHF totals			22	6	8	14	0	3	0	3	3	2
PWHL totals			46	2	7	9	8	18	3	5	8	4

== Awards and honors ==
Honors	Year
PWHL
Walter Cup Champion	2024, 2025
