= Gwyneth Philips =

American ice hockey player (born 2000)

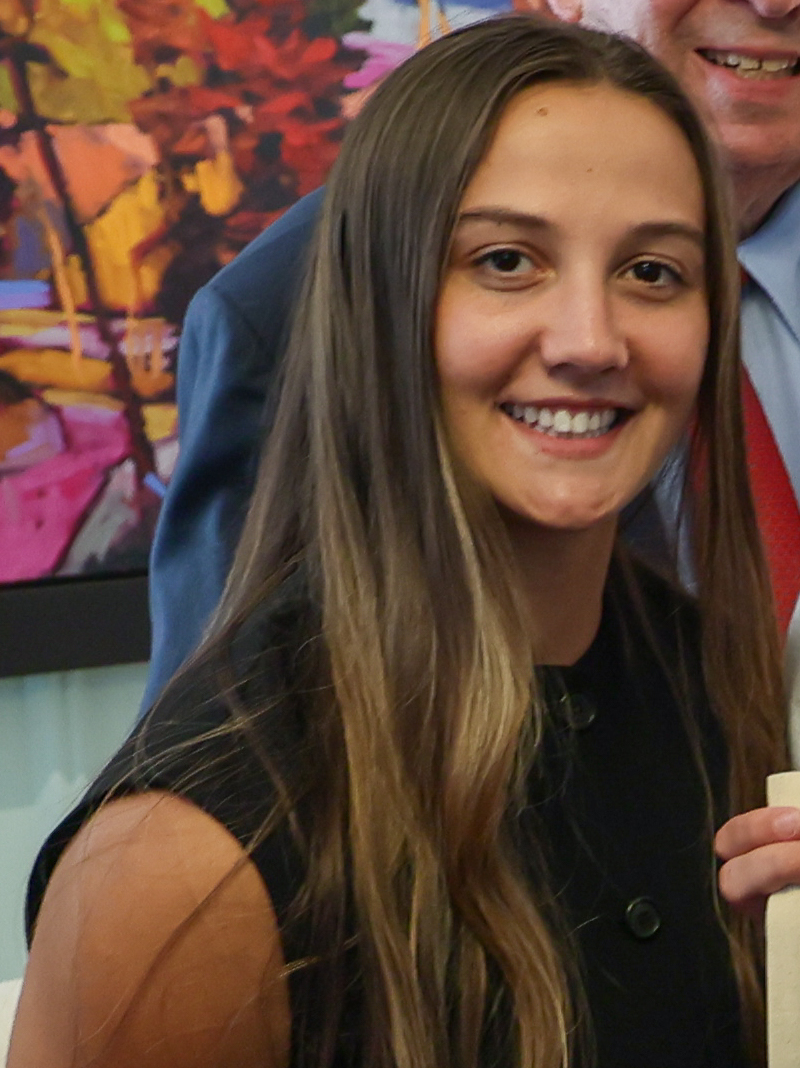
- Philips in 2024
- Born: September 17, 2000 (age 26) Athens, Ohio, U.S.
- Height: 5 ft 5 in (165 cm)
- Position: Goaltender
- Catches: Right
- PWHL team: Ottawa Charge
- National team: United States
- Playing career: 2019–present
Medal record
Olympic Games
| Gold medal – first place | 2026 Milano Cortina | Team |
World Championship
| Gold medal – first place | 2025 Czechia |
| Gold medal – first place | 2026 Denmark |
| Silver medal – second place | 2024 United States |

Gwyneth Suzanne Philips (born September 17, 2000) is an American professional ice hockey player who is a goaltender for the Ottawa Charge of the Professional Women's Hockey League (PWHL) and member of the United States women's national ice hockey team.

A world champion with Team USA, winning gold at the 2025 World Championship, she was named the Ilana Kloss Playoff Most Valuable Player after leading the Charge to the 2025 PWHL Finals. At the collegiate level, she was the WHCA National Goalie of the Year in 2023 and finished her career at Northeastern with the highest save percentage (.958) in NCAA history.

== Early life ==
Philips was born in Athens, Ohio, to Guy and Linda Philips, and has one brother, Guy. She attended Shady Side Academy in Pittsburgh, where she was a two-sport athlete competing in ice hockey and lacrosse.

As a goaltender for Shady Side Academy's ice hockey program, Philips helped lead her team to three Women's Interscholastic Hockey League of the Mid-Atlantic (WIHLMA) Championships in 2016, 2017, and 2019 - captaining the team as a senior in 2019. She earned First-Team All-WIHLMA honors in 2015, 2016, and 2019.

== Playing career ==
=== College ===
Philips began her collegiate hockey career for Northeastern during the 2019–20 season. During her freshman year she appeared in seven games, and posted a 5–0–0 record with three shutouts. She recorded three shutouts in her first three career games. She served as the backup goaltender for Aerin Frankel her first three years at Northeastern. During that time she appeared in 16 games with a 13–1–0 record, a 0.64 goals against average (GAA) and .969 save percentage.

During the 2022–23 season, in her senior year, she started all 38 games for the Huskies and posted a 34–3–1 record. She led the nation with 34 wins, a 0.87 GAA and .960 save percentage. She set single-season program records for games played (38), minutes played (2,272) and wins (34), while her 0.87 GAA, 10 shutouts and .960 save percentage rank second all-time in program history. Following an outstanding season, she was named All-Hockey East First Team, CCM/AHCA First Team All-American, Hockey East Goaltender of the Year and WHCA National Goalie of the Year. She was also named a top-ten finalist for the Patty Kazmaier Award.

During the 2023–24 season, in her fifth year, she started all 37 games for the Huskies and posted a 23–11–3 record, with a 1.17 GAA and .955 save percentage. Her 23 wins, and six shutouts were tied for third best in the NCAA, while her .955 save percentage led the nation. Following the season, she was named All-Hockey East First Team, CCM/AHCA First Team All-American and Hockey East Goaltender of the Year for the second consecutive year. She was again named a top-ten finalist for the Patty Kazmaier Award, and a finalist for the WHCA National Goalie of the Year. She finished her collegiate career with a .958 save percentage, the highest in NCAA history.

=== Professional ===
External videos
- Gwyneth Philips Wins 2025 Ilana Kloss Playoff Most Valuable Player Award, Ottawa Charge

On June 10, 2024, Philips was drafted in the third round, 14th overall, by PWHL Ottawa in the 2024 PWHL draft. She was the first goaltender selected in the draft. During the 2025 PWHL playoffs, she appeared in all eight playoffs games for the Charge, and posted a 1.23 GAA and a .952 save percentage. She recorded four postseason wins, including one shutout, and didn't lose a game in regulation throughout the playoffs, as all four games of the 2025 PWHL Finals went to overtime. She was subsequently named the Ilana Kloss Playoff Most Valuable Player. On July 27, 2025, she signed a two-year contract extension with the Charge.

In the 2025-26 Charge season opener, Phillips recorded a career high 38 saves, earning Third Star of the Game honors.

== International play ==
Philips has played for the United States national team since 2024.

=== World Championships ===
On March 31, 2024, she was named to the roster for the 2024 IIHF Women's World Championship, where she served as backup to Aerin Frankel. The United States won the silver medal at the tournament.

External videos
- Philips Records First Career Shutout In 4-0 Victory, USA Hockey

Philips returned to the national team for the 2025 IIHF Women's World Championship. During the tournament, Philips recorded her first career shutout for Team USA in a 4–0 victory over Czechia. In the gold medal game against Canada, Frankel was injured following a collision in the second period. Philips entered the game and stopped 17 of 18 shots over the final 32 minutes of regulation and overtime as the United States won 4–3 in overtime, securing the gold medal. She finished the tournament with a 3–0 record. She received 22.3% of the vote for IIHF’s Female Player of the Year coming in second only to Canadian captain Marie-Philip Poulin.

=== Olympics ===
On January 2, 2026, Philips was named to team USA's roster to compete at the 2026 Winter Olympics. She made her Olympic debut in a preliminary round game against Switzerland on February 9, 2026, making 20 saves in a 5–0 win, combining with Ava McNaughton for the shutout. She recorded another shutout in the quarterfinals against Italy, making six saves in a 6–0 win, as the U.S. eliminated host nation Italy. It marked the first time that the United States and Italy played each other in women's ice hockey at the Winter Olympics.

=== Rivalry Series ===
On December 11, 2025, Phillips recorded 29 saves in a 10–4 victory versus Canada. Held in Edmonton, Alberta, this was the third game of the 2025 Rivalry Series, marking the first time that the Canadian women's national ice hockey team allowed 10 goals in a loss to the United States.

== Personal life ==
Phillips graduated from Northeastern University with a major in industrial engineering. Her favorite TV show is Game of Thrones, and her favorite post game meal is Chicken Parmesan.

Following the 2024–25 season, Philips described the experience as 'two months of a whirlwind' rather than a traditional season, and spent part of the subsequent offseason camping for approximately 20 days in California.

== Career statistics ==
=== Regular season and playoffs ===
| | | | Regular season | | | | | | | | | Playoffs |
| Season | Team | League | GP | W | L | OTL | MIN | GA | SO | GAA | SV% | GP | W | L | MIN | GA | SO | GAA | SV% |
|---|---|---|---|---|---|---|---|---|---|---|---|---|---|---|---|---|---|---|---|
| 2019–20 | Northeastern University | HE | 7 | 5 | 0 | 0 | 342 | 2 | 3 | 0.37 | .982 | — | — | — | — | — | — | — | — |
| 2020–21 | Northeastern University | HE | 2 | 2 | 0 | 0 | 124 | 2 | 1 | 0.97 | .941 | — | — | — | — | — | — | — | — |
| 2021–22 | Northeastern University | HE | 7 | 6 | 1 | 0 | 398 | 5 | 2 | 0.75 | .964 | — | — | — | — | — | — | — | — |
| 2022–23 | Northeastern University | HE | 38 | 34 | 3 | 1 | 2,272 | 33 | 10 | 0.87 | .960 | — | — | — | — | — | — | — | — |
| 2023–24 | Northeastern University | HE | 37 | 23 | 11 | 3 | 2,247 | 44 | 6 | 1.17 | .955 | — | — | — | — | — | — | — | — |
| 2024–25 | Ottawa Charge | PWHL | 15 | 8 | 5 | 1 | 795 | 28 | 2 | 2.11 | .919 | 8 | 4 | 4 | 635 | 13 | 1 | 1.23 | .952 |
| 2025–26 | Ottawa Charge | PWHL | 28 | 16 | 11 | 3 | 1643 | 58 | 3 | 2.12 | .931 | 8 | 4 | 4 | 513 | 17 | 0 | 1.99 | .929 |
| PWHL totals | | | 43 | 24 | 16 | 6 | 2438 | 86 | 5 | 2.12 | .928 | 16 | 8 | 8 | 1148 | 30 | 1 | 1.57 | .941 |

== Awards and honors ==
| Honors | Year |
College
| All-Hockey East First Team | 2023 |
| CCM/AHCA First-Team All-American | 2023 |
| Hockey East Goaltender of the Year | 2023 |
| WHCA National Goalie of the Year | 2023 |
| All-Hockey East First Team | 2024 |
| Hockey East Three Stars Award | 2024 |
| Hockey East Goaltender of the Year | 2024 |
| CCM/AHCA First-Team All-American | 2024 |
PWHL
| Ilana Kloss Playoff MVP | 2025 |
| All-Rookie Team | 2025 |
