= Maggie Flaherty (ice hockey) =

American ice hockey player (born 2000)

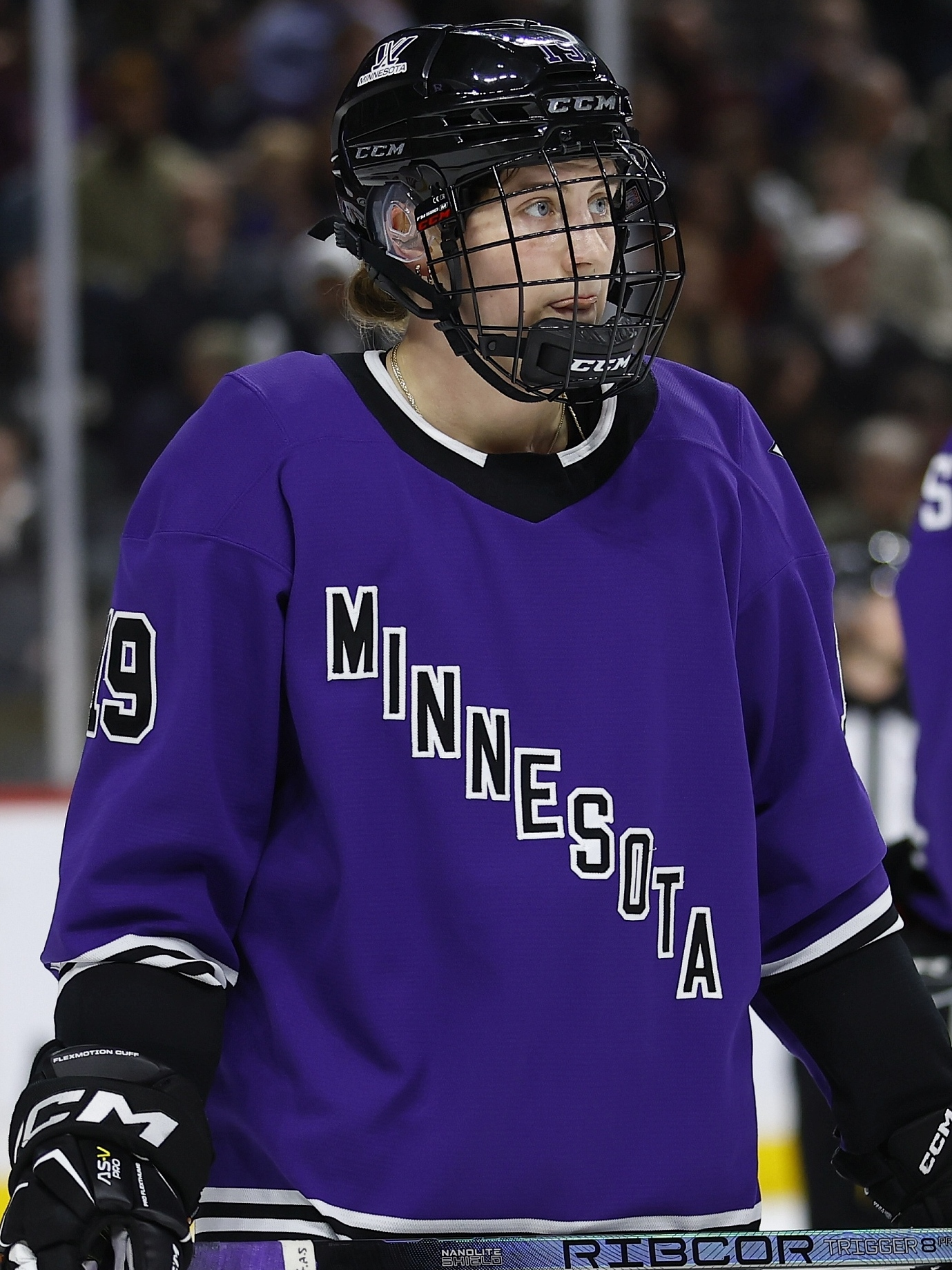
- Flaherty with PWHL Minnesota in 2024
- Born: June 2, 2000 (age 26) Edina, Minnesota, U.S.
- Height: 5 ft 9 in (175 cm)
- Position: Defense
- PWHL team Former teams: Montreal Victoire; Minnesota Frost
- Playing career: 2023–present

Margaret Elizabeth Flaherty (born June 2, 2000) is an American professional ice hockey player who is a defender for the Montreal Victoire of the Professional Women's Hockey League (PWHL). She previously played for the Minnesota Frost of the PWHL. She played college ice hockey at Minnesota Duluth.

== Playing career ==
Flaherty was drafted in the fourth round, 24th overall by the PWHL Minnesota..In two seasons with the Minnesota Frost she recorded two goals and six assists in 46 games, and won consecutive Walter Cups. On June 20, 2025, Flaherty signed a one-year contract with the Montreal Victoire. In June she extended her contract with Montreal, till the 2027-28 season. During the 2026 PWHL Expansion Draft, she was one of three players, who were allowed to be protected in the third round by Montreal.

== International play ==
Medal record

Representing United States

World U18 Championship
Gold medal – first place	2018 Russia	

Flaherty was a member of the gold medal-winning United States women's national under-18 ice hockey team at the IIHF World Women's U18 Championship in 2018.

== Personal life ==
Flaherty was born in Edina, Minnesota and grew up in Lakeville, Minnesota. She attended the University of Minnesota Duluth and earned a bachelor's degree in communications.

== Career statistics ==
=== Regular season and playoffs ===
Note: GP = Games played; G = Goals; A = Assists; Pts = Points; PIM = Penalty minutes;

			Regular season					Playoffs
Season	Team	League	GP	G	A	Pts	PIM	GP	G	A	Pts	PIM
2018–19	University of Minnesota Duluth	WCHA	35	4	16	20	38	—	—	—	—	—
2019–20	University of Minnesota Duluth	WCHA	36	1	17	18	42	—	—	—	—	—
2020–21	University of Minnesota Duluth	WCHA	18	0	6	6	35	—	—	—	—	—
2021–22	University of Minnesota Duluth	WCHA	25	2	5	7	27	—	—	—	—	—
2022–23	University of Minnesota Duluth	WCHA	39	9	16	25	34	—	—	—	—	—
2023–24	PWHL Minnesota	PWHL	24	1	5	6	14	10	1	0	1	2
2024–25	Minnesota Frost	PWHL	22	1	1	2	12	6	0	0	0	4
2025–26	Montreal Victoire	PWHL	30	4	5	9	35	9	3	1	4	8
PWHL totals			76	6	11	17	61	25	4	1	5	8

=== International ===
Year	Team	Event	Result	GP	G	A	Pts	PIM
2018	United States	U18	1st place, gold medalist(s)	5	0	0	0	8
Junior totals				5	0	0	0	8

== Awards and honors ==
Honors	Year
PWHL
Walter Cup Champion	2024, 2025, 2026
