= Britta Curl-Salemme =

American ice hockey player (born 2000)

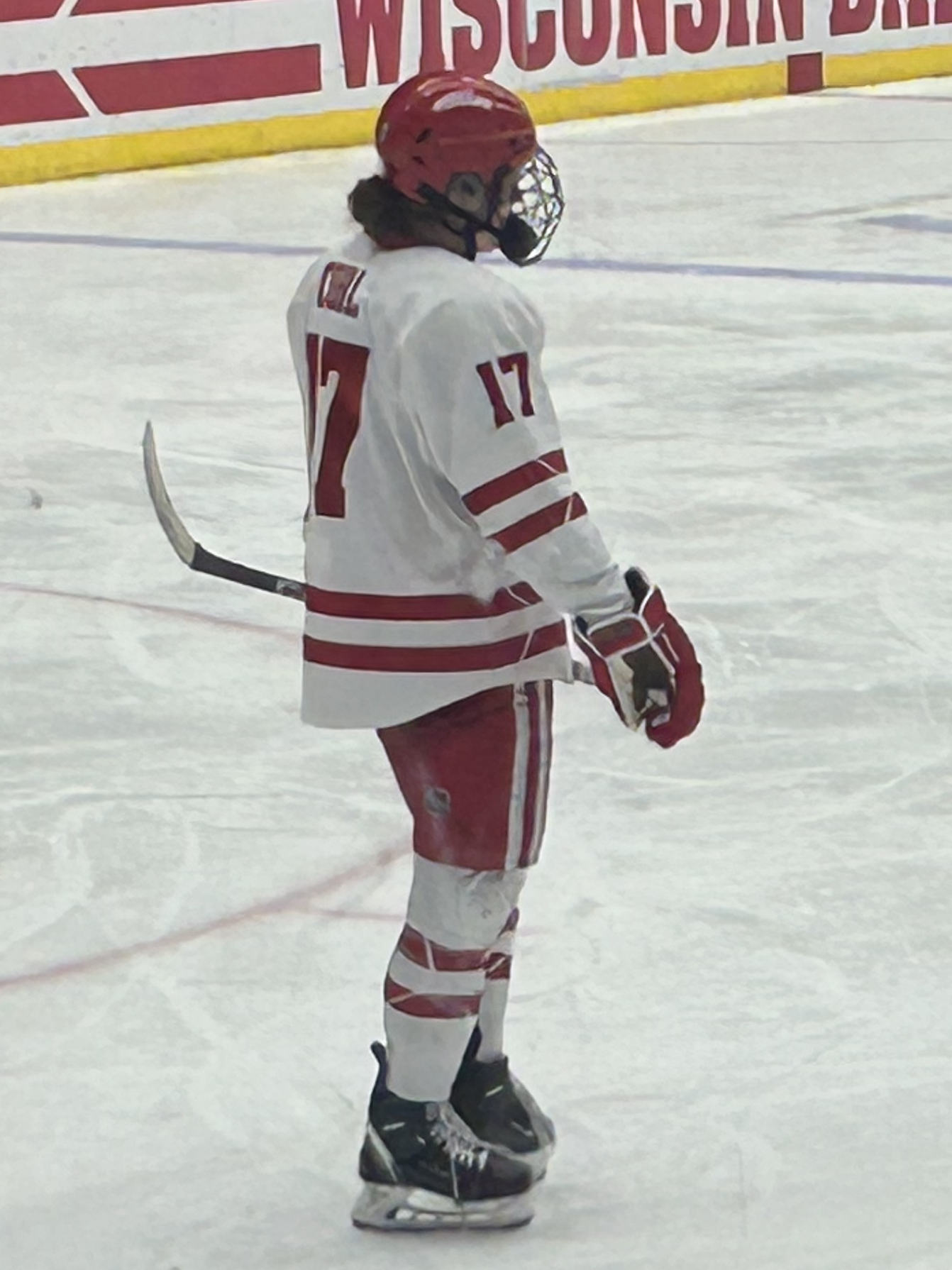
- Curl with Wisconsin in February 2024
- Born: March 20, 2000 (age 26) Bismarck, North Dakota, U.S.
- Height: 5 ft 9 in (175 cm)
- Weight: 170 lb (77 kg; 12 st 2 lb)
- Position: Forward
- Shoots: Left
- PWHL team Former teams: Detroit Clutch; Minnesota Frost
- National team: United States
- Playing career: 2024–present
Medal record
Olympic Games
Gold medal – first place	2026 Milano Cortina	Team
World Championships
Gold medal – first place	2023 Canada
Gold medal – first place	2025 Czechia
Silver medal – second place	2021 Canada
Silver medal – second place	2024 United States
World U18 Championship
Gold medal – first place	2018 Russia

Britta Curl-Salemme (née Curl; born March 20, 2000) is an American professional ice hockey player who is a forward for the Detroit Clutch of the Professional Women's Hockey League (PWHL) and member of the United States women's national ice hockey team. She has won gold medals with Team USA at the 2026 Winter Olympics, the 2023 and 2025 World Championships, and silver medals at the 2021 and 2024 World Championships.

Curl-Salemme played college ice hockey for the University of Wisconsin, where she won three national championships (2019, 2021, 2023) and served as team captain for two seasons. She finished her collegiate career as the program's all-time leader in games played with 181, and ranks eighth in program history with 179 points.

In her rookie season with the Frost, Curl-Salemme recorded 15 points in 28 regular season games and helped the team win their second consecutive Walter Cup championship. During Game 2 of the 2025 PWHL Finals, she scored the game-tying goal with 16 seconds remaining in regulation and the overtime winner.

== Early life ==
Born in Bismarck, North Dakota, to Gretchen and Bill Curl, Britta was raised with her two brothers, Byrne and Cullen, and sister, Brenna, in a Catholic household with her mother, a physician, and her father, who retired early to help raise their four children. Curl began skating at age three on a backyard ice rink that her father built each winter at their Bismarck home. She and her three siblings would skate and play pickup games on the rink whenever they could, with Curl-Salemme often following her older brother around the ice. She credits her two brothers and younger sister with creating a competitive family dynamic that shaped her playing style.

Curl played boys youth hockey until eighth grade, when she joined the Bismarck Blizzard, the co-op girls hockey team for all high schools in Bismarck. She attended St. Mary's Central High School, a private Catholic school in Bismarck. During her five seasons with the Blizzard, she recorded 189 goals and 116 assists, leading the team to four consecutive state championships from 2015 to 2018 and serving as captain for three of those championship teams. She was the state's leading scorer in her sophomore and junior seasons, and was named state tournament MVP in 2018 after scoring twice in a 3-0 victory over Fargo North-South in the championship game.

In addition to hockey, Curl was a multi-sport athlete at St. Mary's, competing in soccer, track and field, and briefly serving as a kicker for the school's football team. She was an all-state performer in soccer and a state place winner and school record holder in the 100- and 300-meter hurdles in track and field.

== Playing career ==
=== College ===
Curl began her collegiate hockey career for the Wisconsin Badgers during the 2018–19 season. She recorded her first career goal on October 5, 2018, in a game against Mercyhurst. She was named the WCHA Rookie of the Week for the week ending October 30, 2018, after she recorded a goal and an assist to tie for the WCHA rookie scoring lead during the weekend. On February 9, 2019, she tied her career-high with three points in a game against Minnesota State. She was subsequently named WCHA Player of the Week for the week ending February 12, 2019. During a weekend series against St. Cloud State, she recorded two multi-goal games. Her four goals tied for the WCHA and NCAA lead in scoring. She became the seventh Badger freshman to score 20 or more goals in her rookie season. She was subsequently named the WCHA Rookie of the Week for the week ending March 5, 2019. During her freshman season, she recorded 22 goals and 11 assists and helped the Badgers win the National Collegiate Women's Ice Hockey Championship. Her 22 goals were tied for the fifth-most in program history by a freshman. She became the eighth Badger to score 20 goals her freshman year and the first player to do so since Annie Pankowski in 2015.

During the 2019–20 season she recorded 16 goals and nine assists in 36 games in a season that was cancelled due to the COVID-19 pandemic. On November 12, 2020, she was named an alternate captain for the 2020–21 season. During her junior season, she recorded seven goals and ten assists in 21 games and helped the Badgers repeat as national champions.

During the 2022–23 season, she served as captain and recorded 19 goals and 23 assists in 41 games, and helped Wisconsin win the national championship. She ranked second on the team in points with 43, led the team in goals with 19, and tied for the team lead in game-winning and power-play goals with four each. During the 2023–24 season, she again served as captain and appeared in all 41 games for the Badgers. She posted a career-high 62 points on 22 goals and 40 assists. She set a school record for consecutive games with a goal scored as she recorded 11 goals in ten consecutive games from September 29 to November 3.

She finished her collegiate career with 86 goals and 93 assists in 181 games played, and helped Wisconsin to reach four national finals and win three national championships in five seasons. She's Wisconsin's all-time leader in games played, and ranks seventh in program history in goals, 14th in assists, and ninth in points with 179.

=== Professional ===
==== Minnesota Frost (2024–2026) ====
===== 2024–25 season =====
On June 10, 2024, Curl-Salemme was drafted in the second round, ninth overall, by PWHL Minnesota (later rebranded as Minnesota Frost) in the 2024 PWHL Draft. On June 21, 2024, she signed a two-year contract with Minnesota. During the 2024–25 PWHL season, Curl-Salemme recorded her first two career PWHL goals on December 7, 2024, in a 6-3 victory over the Toronto Sceptres, including the game-tying goal in the second period and the game-winner in the third period. She finished her rookie regular season with nine goals and six assists for 15 points in 28 games, tying for third in rookie scoring. She also recorded 24 penalty minutes, second on the team and among the top ten in the league. Curl-Salemme's physical style of play resulted in three suspensions during her rookie season. She received two one-game suspensions during the regular season: the first for high-sticking on January 2, 2025, against the Boston Fleet, and the second for an illegal check to the head on March 9 in Toronto.

During the 2025 PWHL playoffs, Curl-Salemme scored the Frost's first goal of the postseason on a power play in Game 1 of the semifinals against Toronto, but was assessed a five-minute major and game misconduct 41 seconds later for a hit to the head of Renata Fast, resulting in a one-game suspension. She recorded three goals in eight playoff games to help the Frost win their second consecutive Walter Cup. In Game 2 of the 2025 PWHL Finals against the Ottawa Charge, she scored the game-tying goal with 16 seconds remaining in regulation and the game-winning goal at 16:24 of overtime in a 2-1 victory, helping even the series at one game apiece. Her performance in Ottawa was accompanied by loud boos from the crowd each time she touched the puck, with fans holding signs that read "Britta Curl's not our girl." Head coach Ken Klee praised her composure, stating, "It's not easy to do, especially in hostile environments that we play in."

On October 6, 2025, she signed a two-year contract extension with the Frost through the 2027–28 season. Frost general manager Melissa Caruso stated, "We knew what we were getting in Britta, and she has lived up to every expectation. She's made a meaningful impact on the ice, brought great energy to the locker room, and is one of the first to step up to volunteer in our community."

===== 2025–26 season =====
She was one of four players the Frost protected in the PWHL's first-ever expansion draft. During the 2025–26 PWHL season, she recorded 11 goals and 18 assists in 30 games. She ranked third in the league in scoring with 29 points, while her 18 assists set a new single-season record.

==== Detroit Clutch (2026–present) ====
During the league's expansion to 12 teams ahead of the 2026–27 season, Curl-Salemme was left unprotected by the Frost and signed a three-year contract with the Detroit Clutch on June 5, 2026.

== International play ==
=== Junior ===
Curl-Salemme represented the United States at the 2018 IIHF World Women's U18 Championship in Obihiro, Russia, where she recorded four goals and four assists in five games played, tying for second in points scored on her team. She scored two goals in the gold medal game as the United States defeated Sweden 9-3 on January 13, 2018.

=== Senior ===
As of January 2026, Curl-Salemme has competed in four IIHF Women's World Championships with Team USA, winning gold medals in 2023 and 2025, and silver medals in 2021 and 2024. On March 30, 2021, Curl-Salemme was named to the roster for the United States at the 2021 IIHF Women's World Championship in Calgary, marking her first senior team appearance. She scored a goal in three games played as the United States lost the gold medal game to Canada in overtime, earning a silver medal.

Following the 2021 World Championship, Curl-Salemme took a year away from Wisconsin to participate in the U.S. residency program in preparation for the 2022 Winter Olympics in Beijing. She was one of the final cuts before the 23-player roster was announced on January 1, 2022. On February 6, 2022, she was selected to replace Brianna Decker, who had suffered a broken left fibula and torn ligaments in her ankle in the tournament opener against Finland. However, Curl-Salemme tested positive for COVID-19 during processing in Los Angeles and was unable to clear testing protocol in time to travel to Beijing, preventing her from joining the team for the playoff round.

Curl-Salemme was named to the U.S. roster for the 2023 IIHF Women's World Championship in Brampton, Ontario, where the United States won a gold medal. She again competed at the 2024 IIHF Women's World Championship, where she recorded three assists in seven games, and won a silver medal. She was selected for the U.S. roster at the 2025 IIHF Women's World Championship in Prague, Czech Republic, where the United States won the gold medal.

On December 11, 2025, she scored a goal in a 10-4 victory over Canada in Edmonton, Alberta, the third game of the 2025 Rivalry Series, marking the first time the Canadian women's national ice hockey team had allowed 10 goals in a loss to the United States.

On January 2, 2026, she was named to team USA's roster to compete at the 2026 Winter Olympics. In the quarterfinals of the 2026 Olympics, Curl registered a goal and an assist as the U.S. eliminated host nation Italy in a 6-0 win. It marked the first time that the United States and Italy played each other in women's ice hockey at the Winter Olympics.

== Personal life ==
Curl was born to Bill and Gretchen Curl. She has two brothers, Byrne and Cullen, and one sister, Brenna, who currently plays hockey for the Maine Black Bears. She attended St. Mary's Central High School, a private Catholic school in Bismarck, North Dakota, and is a practicing Catholic. She married former Wisconsin Badgers wrestler Andrew Salemme on September 7, 2024. On November 2, 2026, Britta announced that she was pregnant, and would miss the 2026–27 PWHL season.

== Social media controversy ==
Curl has garnered controversy for her social media activity, which included reposting promotional material from The Daily Wire for What Is a Woman?, a film that questions the intellectual rationale for societal recognition of gender identity and has been described as anti-trans or transphobic; liking a post supporting Kyle Rittenhouse; and liking a post from conservative commentator Candace Owens calling Target "perverted" for the sale of tuck-friendly women's swimwear as part of its 2023 Pride lineup.

In June 2023, Curl also posted in support of fellow hockey player Jocelyne Lamoureux after Lamoureux praised USA Powerlifting for an appeal to a ruling requiring it permit the participation of a transgender woman in its women's categories. Freelance journalist Nicole Haase called for Lamoureux's removal from the Professional Women's Hockey Players Association board due to "absolutely abhorrent transphobic behavior." Curl posted a response to Haase with the caption "Females protecting female players on the female players association board? Thank you @LamoureuxTwins 👏👏".

When her selection by Minnesota in the 2024 PWHL Draft led to backlash from some fans, she posted an apology video to X and Instagram, stating in part "I specifically recognize that my social media activity has resulted in hurt being felt across communities including LGBTQ+ and BIPOC individuals. I just want to apologize and take ownership of that." The team released a statement about inclusivity on the same day, but did not directly reference Curl.

In September 2025, Curl was announced as representative of FIERCE Athlete, an organization whose stated goal is to empower Christian female athletes and has repeatedly platformed anti-trans content and those calling for the exclusion of transgender women from women's sports.

== Career statistics ==
=== Regular season and playoffs ===
Note: GP = Games played; G = Goals; A = Assists; Pts = Points; PIM = Penalty minutes;

			Regular season					Playoffs
Season	Team	League	GP	G	A	Pts	PIM	GP	G	A	Pts	PIM
2018–19	University of Wisconsin	WCHA	41	22	11	33	16	—	—	—	—	—
2019–20	University of Wisconsin	WCHA	36	16	9	25	20	—	—	—	—	—
2020–21	University of Wisconsin	WCHA	21	7	10	17	18	—	—	—	—	—
2022–23	University of Wisconsin	WCHA	42	19	23	42	22	—	—	—	—	—
2023–24	University of Wisconsin	WCHA	41	22	40	62	27	—	—	—	—	—
2024–25	Minnesota Frost	PWHL	28	9	6	15	24	8	3	0	3	15
2025–26	Minnesota Frost	PWHL	30	11	18	29	22	4	0	2	2	17
PWHL totals			58	20	24	44	46	11	3	2	5	32

=== International ===
Year	Team	Event	Result	GP	G	A	Pts	PIM
2018	United States	U18	1st place, gold medalist(s)	5	4	4	8	2
2021	United States	WC	2nd place, silver medalist(s)	3	1	0	1	2
2023	United States	WC	1st place, gold medalist(s)	2	0	0	0	2
2024	United States	WC	2nd place, silver medalist(s)	7	0	3	3	4
2025	United States	WC	1st place, gold medalist(s)	7	0	0	0	2
2026	United States	OG	1st place, gold medalist(s)	7	1	5	6	2
Junior totals				5	4	4	8	2
Senior totals				26	2	8	10	12

== Awards and honors ==
Honors	Year
PWHL
Walter Cup Champion	2025
All-Rookie Team	2025
All-Second Team	2026
