= Ann-Renée Desbiens =

Canadian ice hockey player (born 1994)

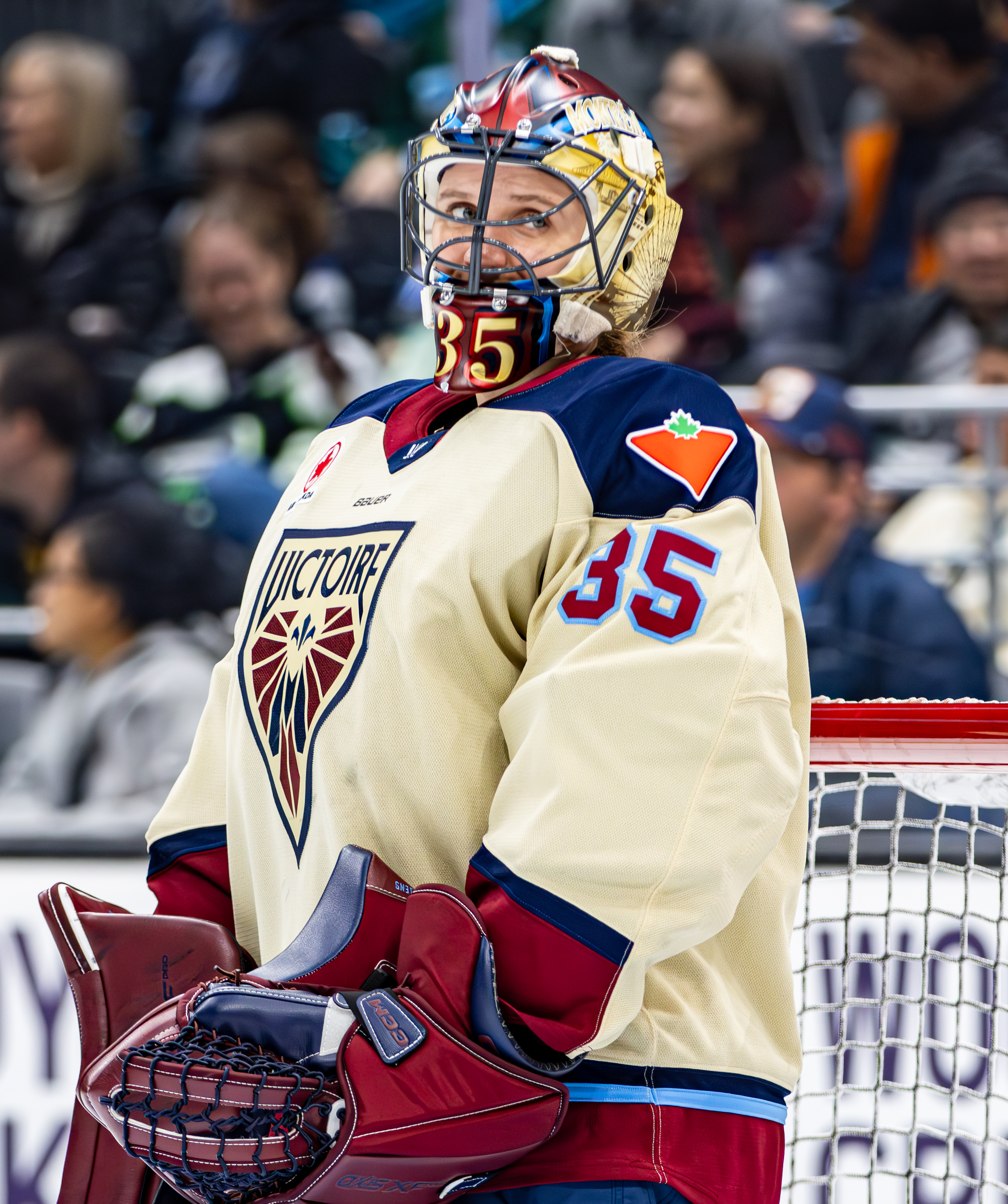
- Desbiens with the Montreal Victoire in 2025
- Born: April 10, 1994 (age 32) Clermont, Quebec, Canada
- Height: 1.75 m (5 ft 9 in)
- Weight: 73 kg (161 lb; 11 st 7 lb)
- Position: Goaltender
- Catches: Left
- PWHL team Former teams: Montreal Victoire; Montréal Stars; PWHPA
- National team: Canada
- Playing career: 2013–present
Medal record
Women's ice hockey
Representing Canada
Olympic Games
| Gold medal – first place | 2022 Beijing | Team |
| Silver medal – second place | 2018 Pyeongchang | Team |
| Silver medal – second place | 2026 Milano Cortina | Team |
World Championship
| Gold medal – first place | 2021 Canada |
| Gold medal – first place | 2022 Denmark |
| Gold medal – first place | 2024 United States |
| Silver medal – second place | 2015 Sweden |
| Silver medal – second place | 2023 Canada |
| Silver medal – second place | 2025 Czechia |
| Silver medal – second place | 2026 Denmark |

Ann-Renée Desbiens (born April 10, 1994) is a Canadian ice hockey goaltender for the Montreal Victoire and member of the Canada women's national ice hockey team.

She participated at the 2015 IIHF Women's World Championship, the 2018 Winter Olympics, the 2021 IIHF Women's World Championship, the 2022 Winter Olympics, and the 2022 IIHF Women's World Championship. She won silver at the 2026 Winter Olympics.

== Playing career ==
Desbiens was the first female player drafted to the Quebec Junior AAA Hockey League, the second-highest men's junior league in Québec after the QMJHL. She was selected by the Loups de La Tuque but was cut before ever playing a game because the coach didn't believe there was any point in developing girls. That same year, she participated in the Shawinigan Cataractes training camp.

She made one playoff appearance for the Montréal Stars of the Canadian Women's Hockey League (CWHL) in 2012, as the team won the Clarkson Cup.

=== College ===
In 2013, she was offered a scholarship to play at the University of Wisconsin in the NCAA, despite not being fluent in English. Across four years with the Wisconsin Badgers women's ice hockey program, she led the team to four Frozen Four appearances, tallied 99 wins in 122 games, and set several individual records, including highest career save percentage (SV%), at .963, and lowest goals against average (GAA), with 0.71.

During her senior year, on November 6, 2016, Desbiens broke Noora Räty's record for most NCAA career shutouts of any gender. In a 6–0 shutout victory against the Bemidji State Beavers, Desbiens would log career shutout number 44. At the end of her senior year, Desbiens was awarded the Patty Kazmaier Award as the top female college ice hockey player in the United States.

Desbiens was the first Canadian selected at the 2016 NWHL Draft, chosen in the first round, fourth overall by the Boston Pride. As of 2021, she has not appeared with the team nor made any indication of interest in playing in the NWHL.

After the 2018 Olympics, during the 2018-19 season, Desbiens took a break from hockey, citing exhaustion and the uncertainty of options to play professionally. In May 2019, she returned to hockey by joining the PWHPA.

In the 2019–20 season, Desbiens appeared for the Fond du Lac Bears in the Great Lakes Hockey League, an elite men's amateur league. She also participated in the women's ice hockey showcase at the 2020 NHL All-Star Game, making 15 saves as the Canadian All-Stars beat the American All-Stars.

=== PWHPA ===
Standing between the pipes for Team Bauer (Montreal) in the 2021 Secret Cup, which was the Canadian leg of the 2020–21 PWHPA Dream Gap Tour, Ann-Renee Desbiens registered 19 saves in a 4-2 championship game win over Team Sonnet (Toronto).

=== PWHL ===
In 2023, the PWHPA and the rival Premier Hockey Federation consolidated into the new Professional Women's Hockey League. With each of the six new teams able to make three initial free agency signings, Desbiens was widely assessed as a probable signing by the new PWHL Montreal, later renamed the Montreal Victoire. On September 5, she was reported as one of Montreal team's first three players, alongside Team Canada teammates Marie-Philip Poulin and Laura Stacey. In the 2024-25 PWHL season, Desbiens was awarded Goaltender of the Year. During the 2025 PWHL Expansion Draft, she was one of three players who were allowed to be protected first by Montreal. On October 23, 2025, she signed a two-year contract extension with the Victoire. During the 2026 PWHL Expansion Draft, she was again one of three players, who were allowed to be protected first by Montreal.

== International play ==
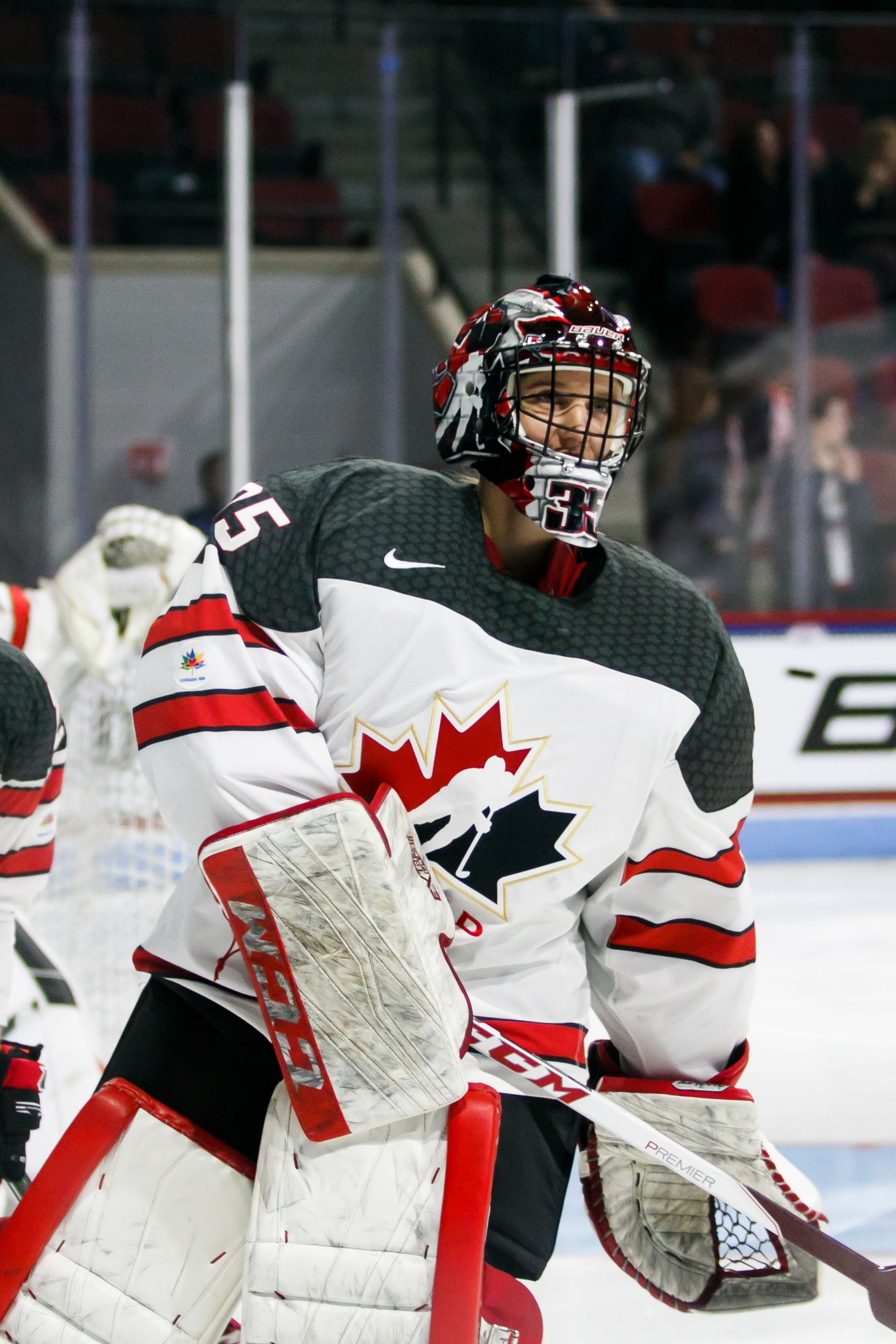
Desbiens with Canada during the 2017 IIHF Women's World Championship

Desbiens was selected to play for Team Canada at the 2015 IIHF Women's World Championship, where she guided Canada to a silver medal. She was also selected to play for Team Canada at the 2018 Winter Olympics, where she again won a silver medal.

On January 11, 2022, Desbiens was named to Canada's 2022 Olympic team.

=== International play ===
Desbiens was part of Canada's National Women's Under-18 Team to a gold medal at the 2010 IIHF World Women's Under-18 Championship in Chicago. As a member of the gold medal-winning squad, a hockey card of her was featured in the Upper Deck 2010 World of Sports card series. In addition, she participated in the Canada Celebrates Event on June 30 in Edmonton, Alberta which recognized the Canadian Olympic and World hockey champions from the 2009–10 season .

During the 2011–12 Canada women's national ice hockey team season, she was a member of the Canadian National Under 18 team that participated in a three-game series vs. the US in August 2011. She was part of the gold medal-winning Team Ontario Red squad at the 2011 Canadian National Women's Under-18 Championships

=== Olympics ===
Desbiens competed for Team Canada at her first Olympic Games in PyeongChang 2018, earning a shutout against the Olympic Athletes of Russia. Following the Games, Desbiens stepped back from goaltending for an eighteen month break until the 2019-2020 Canada-USA Rivalry Series.

On January 11, 2022, Desbiens was named to Canada's 2022 Olympic team. There, she made five starts. In a preliminary game against the United States, she made 51 saves on 53 shots, setting a Canadian record for the most saves in an Olympic game. In the gold medal game, also against the United States, she made 38 saves on 40 shots, earning her first Olympic gold medal.

On January 9, 2026, Desbiens was named to Canada's roster to compete at the 2026 Winter Olympics. She made her tournament debut on February 9, 2026, featuring in a 5–1 victory over Czechia. She was part of the squad which won the silver medal, following a 2-1 loss against the United States in the final on February 19, 2026, a game in which she made 31 saves.

== Personal life ==
Desbiens has a master's degree in accounting. She has named NHL goaltender Patrick Roy as a role model, her family being supporters of the Quebec Nordiques and then the Colorado Avalanche.

In October 2025, a sculpture of Ann-Renée Desbiens was unveiled at the Clermont Arena in her hometown.

== Career statistics ==
=== Regular season and playoffs ===
| | | | Regular season | | | | | | | | | Playoffs |
| Season | Team | League | GP | W | L | OT | MIN | GA | SO | GAA | SV% | GP | W | L | MIN | GA | SO | GAA | SV% |
|---|---|---|---|---|---|---|---|---|---|---|---|---|---|---|---|---|---|---|---|
| 2011–12 | Montréal Stars | CWHL | — | — | — | — | — | — | — | — | — | 1 | 1 | 0 | — | — | 0 | 3.00 | .000 |
| 2013–14 | University of Wisconsin | WCHA | 12 | 11 | 1 | 0 | 677 | 12 | 3 | 1.06 | .957 | — | — | — | — | — | — | — | — |
| 2014–15 | University of Wisconsin | WCHA | 37 | 26 | 7 | 4 | 2236 | 43 | 14 | 1.15 | .941 | — | — | — | — | — | — | — | — |
| 2015–16 | University of Wisconsin | WCHA | 38 | 33 | 4 | 1 | 2279 | 29 | 21 | 0.76 | .960 | — | — | — | — | — | — | — | — |
| 2016–17 | University of Wisconsin | WCHA | 35 | 29 | 2 | 4 | 2110 | 25 | 17 | 0.71 | .963 | — | — | — | — | — | — | — | — |
| 2019–20 | Fond du Lac Bears | GJHL | 1 | 1 | 0 | 0 | 60 | 1 | 0 | 1.00 | .960 | — | — | — | — | — | — | — | — |
| 2023–24 | PWHL Montreal | PWHL | 16 | 7 | 5 | 2 | 976 | 37 | 1 | 2.28 | .923 | 3 | 0 | 3 | 247 | 7 | 0 | 1.70 | .931 |
| 2024–25 | Montreal Victoire | PWHL | 21 | 15 | 2 | 2 | 1,228 | 38 | 0 | 1.86 | .932 | 4 | 1 | 3 | 311 | 8 | 0 | 1.55 | 0.943 |
| 2025–26 | Montreal Victoire | PWHL | 25 | 16 | 6 | 4 | 1,509 | 28 | 7 | 1.11 | .955 | 9 | 6 | 3 | 601 | 14 | 2 | 1.40 | 0.944 |
| PWHL totals | | | 62 | 38 | 13 | 8 | 3,714 | 103 | 8 | 1,66 | .937 | 16 | 7 | 9 | 1159 | 29 | 2 | 1.50 | 0,948 |

=== International ===
| Year | Team | Event | Result | GP | W | L | T/OT | MIN | GA | SO | GAA | SV% |
|---|---|---|---|---|---|---|---|---|---|---|---|---|
| 2011 | Canada | U18 | 2nd place, silver medalist(s) | 3 | 2 | 1 | 0 | 179 | 5 | 1 | 1.67 | .900 |
| 2015 | Canada | WC | 2nd place, silver medalist(s) | 3 | 2 | 0 | 0 | 140 | 4 | 3 | 1.71 | .931 |
| 2018 | Canada | OG | 2nd place, silver medalist(s) | 1 | 1 | 0 | 0 | 60 | 0 | 1 | 0.00 | 1.000 |
| 2021 | Canada | WC | 1st place, gold medalist(s) | 5 | 5 | 0 | 0 | 307 | 7 | 1 | 1.37 | .908 |
| 2022 | Canada | OG | 1st place, gold medalist(s) | 5 | 5 | 0 | 0 | 300 | 9 | 0 | 1.80 | .940 |
| 2022 | Canada | WC | 1st place, gold medalist(s) | 5 | 5 | 0 | 0 | 300 | 4 | 1 | 0.80 | .934 |
| 2023 | Canada | WC | 2nd place, silver medalist(s) | 5 | 4 | 1 | 0 | 303 | 10 | 1 | 1.98 | .884 |
| 2024 | Canada | WC | 1st place, gold medalist(s) | 5 | 4 | 0 | 1 | 309 | 7 | 2 | 1.36 | .936 |
| 2025 | Canada | WC | 2nd place, silver medalist(s) | 4 | 2 | 1 | 1 | 257 | 7 | 1 | 1.64 | .926 |
| 2026 | Canada | OG | 2nd place, silver medalist(s) | 5 | 3 | 1 | 1 | 296 | 9 | 1 | 1.82 | .914 |
| Junior totals | | | | 3 | 2 | 1 | 0 | 179 | 5 | 1 | 1.67 | .900 |
| Senior totals | | | | 38 | 31 | 3 | 3 | 2272 | 57 | 11 | 1.51 | .925 |

Sources: EliteProspects, University of Wisconsin, Fond du Lac Bears

== Awards and honours ==
| Honours | Year | Ref |
College
| WCHA Player of the Year | 2016 | |
| AHCA-CCM First-team All-American | 2017 | |
| Patty Kazmaier Award | 2017 | |
PWHL
| PWHL Goaltender of the Year | 2025 | |
| First All-Star Team | 2025 | |
| Second All-Star Team | 2026 | |
| Walter Cup champion | 2026 | |

Awards and achievements
| Preceded by Kendall Coyne Schofield | Patty Kazmaier Award; 2016–17 | Succeeded by Daryl Watts |
