= 2026–27 San Jose Sea Lions season =

Professional Women's Hockey League season

2026–27 San Jose Sea Lions
- League: TBD PWHL
- Conference: TBD West
- 2026–27 record: 0–0–0–0
- Home record: 0–0–0–0
- Road record: 0–0–0–0
- Goals for: 0
- Goals against: 0

Team information
- General manager: Troy Ryan
- Coach: Troy Ryan
- Assistant coach: Uffe Lundberg; Jessica Turi
- Captain: TBD
- Arena: SAP Center

Team leaders
- Goals: TBD

The 2026–27 San Jose Sea Lions season will be the team's first season as an expansion member of the Professional Women's Hockey League (PWHL). They play their home games at the SAP Center in San Jose, California.

The dates and locations of the 2026–27 PWHL Takeover Tour were announced on November 19, 2026.

== Offseason ==
On May 22, 2026, San Jose announced former Toronto Sceptres and Canada women's national ice hockey team head coach Troy Ryan as the team's inaugural head coach and general manager, making him the first person to hold both roles simultaneously for a PWHL team.

On July 14, 2026, San Jose announced the hiring of Uffe Lundberg and Jessica Turi as assistant coaches. Lundberg previously served for six seasons as the head coach of the Sweden women's national ice hockey team, and Turi previously served as an assistant coach for both the York University men's and women's ice hockey programs.

== Standings ==
=== Overall Standings ===
Pos	Team	Pld	W	OTW	OTL	L	GF	GA	GD	Pts
1	Boston Fleet	0	0	0	0	0	0	0	0	0
2	Minnesota Frost	0	0	0	0	0	0	0	0	0
3	Montréal Victoire	0	0	0	0	0	0	0	0	0
4	New York Sirens	0	0	0	0	0	0	0	0	0
5	Ottawa Charge	0	0	0	0	0	0	0	0	0
6	Toronto Sceptres	0	0	0	0	0	0	0	0	0
7	Seattle Torrent	0	0	0	0	0	0	0	0	0
8	Vancouver Goldeneyes	0	0	0	0	0	0	0	0	0
9	Detroit Clutch	0	0	0	0	0	0	0	0	0
10	Hamilton Havoc	0	0	0	0	0	0	0	0	0
11	Vegas Vanguards	0	0	0	0	0	0	0	0	0
12	San Jose Sea Lions	0	0	0	0	0	0	0	0	0

Updated to match(es) played on December 5, 2026. Source: PWHL

=== Conference Standings ===
Pos	Team	Pld	W	OTW	OTL	L	GF	GA	GD	Pts
1	Minnesota Frost	0	0	0	0	0	0	0	0	0
2	Seattle Torrent	0	0	0	0	0	0	0	0	0
3	Vancouver Goldeneyes	0	0	0	0	0	0	0	0	0
4	Detroit Clutch	0	0	0	0	0	0	0	0	0
5	Vegas Vanguards	0	0	0	0	0	0	0	0	0
6	San Jose Sea Lions	0	0	0	0	0	0	0	0	0

Updated to match(es) played on December 5, 2026. Source: PWHL

== Schedule and results ==
=== Preseason ===
The PWHL preseason schedule was announced on September 10, 2026. The Sea Lions will play the Seattle Torrent on November 29th in San Jose at the Tech CU Arena, and will play the Torrent again on November 30th in San Jose at the Tech CU Arena.

2026 preseason camp log
November: 0–0–0–0 (home: 0–0–0–0; road: 0–0–0–0)

Game	Date	Visitor	Score	Home	OT	Decision	Location	Attendance	Record	Box score
1	November 29	Seattle	–	San Jose			Tech CU Arena		0–0–0–0	
2	November 30	San Jose	–	Seattle			Tech CU Arena		0–0–0–0	

Regulation Win Overtime/Shootout Win Overtime/Shootout Loss Regulation Loss

=== Regular season ===
The regular season schedule was announced on October 2, 2026. The season will begin on December 5, 2026, and will end on April 18, 2027, with each team playing 30 games. For the 2026–27 season, the league has split teams into East and West conferences. The Eastern Conference will contain the Boston Fleet, Hamilton Havoc, Montréal Victoire, New York Sirens, Ottawa Charge, and Toronto Sceptres. The Western Conference will consist of the Detroit Clutch, Vegas Vanguards, Minnesota Frost, San Jose Sea Lions, Seattle Torrent, and the Vancouver Goldeneyes.

Regular season schedule (Home: 0–0–0–0; Road: 0–0–0–0)
December: 0–0–0–0, 0 points (Home: 0–0–0–0; Road: 0–0–0–0)

Game	Date	Opponent	Score	OT	Decision	Location	Attendance	Record	Points	Box score
1	December 5	Minnesota	–			SAP Center				
2	December 9	Seattle	–			SAP Center				
3	December 12	@ Montréal	–			Place Bell				
4	December 15	@ Ottawa	–			Canadian Tire Centre				
5	December 17	@ Hamilton	–			TD Coliseum				
6	December 20	@ Toronto	–			Coca-Cola Coliseum				
7	December 27	New York	–			SAP Center				
8	December 30	Boston	–			SAP Center				

January: 0–0–0–0, 0 points (Home: 0–0–0–0; Road: 0–0–0–0)

Game	Date	Opponent	Score	OT	Decision	Location	Attendance	Record	Points	Box score
9	January 3	@ Minnesota	–			Grand Casino Arena				
10	January 13	Vegas	–			SAP Center				
11	January 16	Montréal	–			SAP Center				
12	January 19	Hamilton	–			SAP Center				
13	January 22	Toronto	–			SAP Center				
14	January 24	Seattle	–			PPG Paints Arena				
15	January 27	@ Vegas	–			T-Mobile Arena				
16	January 30	@ Detroit	–			Little Caesars Arena				

February: 0–0–0–0, 0 points (Home: 0–0–0–0; Road: 0–0–0–0)

Game	Date	Opponent	Score	OT	Decision	Location	Attendance	Record	Points	Box score
17	February 6	@ Minnesota	–			Lenovo Center				
18	February 9	@ New York	–			Prudential Center				
19	February 13	Vancouver	–			Xfinity Mobile Arena				
20	February 17	Ottawa	–			SAP Center				
21	February 21	Detroit	–			SAP Center				
22	February 28	@ Detroit	–			Nationwide Arena				

March: 0–0–0–0, 0 points (Home: 0–0–0–0; Road: 0–0–0–0)

Game	Date	Opponent	Score	OT	Decision	Location	Attendance	Record	Points	Box score
23	March 13	@ Vancouver	–			Pacific Coliseum				
24	March 18	Minnesota	–			SAP Center				
25	March 21	@ Boston	–			Agganis Arena				
26	March 25	Detroit	–			SAP Center				

April: 0–0–0–0, 0 points (Home: 0–0–0–0; Road: 0–0–0–0)

Game	Date	Opponent	Score	OT	Decision	Location	Attendance	Record	Points	Box score
27	April 1	@ Vancouver	–			Pacific Coliseum				
28	April 7	@ Vegas	–			T-Mobile Arena				
29	April 9	Vancouver	–			SAP Center				
30	April 17	@ Seattle	–			Climate Pledge Arena				

Regulation Win (3 points) Overtime/Shootout Win (2 points) Overtime/Shootout Loss (1 point) Regulation Loss (0 points)

== Transactions ==
=== Draft signings ===
The 2026 PWHL Draft was held on June 17, 2026.

Drafted prospect signings
Date	Player	Draft	Term	Ref.
September 14, 2026	Laila Edwards	First round, 4th overall (2026)	Three years	
September 22, 2026	Sloane Matthews	Second round, 16th overall (2026)	Three years	
September 22, 2026	Tia Chan	Third round, 28th overall (2026)	Three years	
September 23, 2026	Lily Shannon	Fourth round, 40th overall (2026)	Two years	
September 23, 2026	McKenna Van Gelder	Fifth round, 52nd overall (2026)	Two years	

=== Free agency ===
The free agency period began on June 2, 2026.

Free agent signings
Date	Player	Previous team	Term	Ref.
June 5, 2026	Corinne Schroeder	Seattle Torrent	Two years	
June 5, 2026	Rory Guilday	Ottawa Charge	Two years	
June 6, 2026	Anne Cherkowski	New York Sirens	Two years	
June 6, 2026	Kristin O'Neill	New York Sirens	Two years (Note: Received an Expansion Foundational Offer (EFO))	
June 8, 2026	Maddi Wheeler	New York Sirens	Two years	
June 10, 2026	Hadley Hartmetz	Boston Fleet	Two years	
June 11, 2026	Maggie Connors	Toronto Sceptres	Two years	
June 12, 2026	Mariah Keopple	Seattle Torrent	Two years	
June 14, 2026	Natálie Mlýnková	Montréal Victoire	One year	
June 14, 2026	Daniela Pejšová	Boston Fleet	Two years	
June 21, 2026	Abbey Levy	Boston Fleet	One year	
June 21, 2026	Kristin Della Rovere	Toronto Sceptres	One year	
July 8, 2026	Brooke Bryant	Seattle Torrent	One year	
November 18, 2026	Sandra Abstreiter	Montréal Victoire	One year	
