= List of San Jose Sea Lions draft picks =

The San Jose Sea Lions are a professional ice hockey team in the Professional Women's Hockey League (PWHL) that was founded ahead of the 2026–27 season as an expansion team. Their first draft pick was Laila Edwards, selected fourth overall in the 2026 PWHL Draft. San Jose has participated in one PWHL Draft and have drafted six players.

== Key ==
General terms and abbreviations
Term or abbreviation	Definition
Draft	The year that the player was selected
Round	The round of the draft in which the player was selected
Pick	The overall position in the draft at which the player was selected
Pos	Position of the player

Position abbreviations
Abbreviation	Definition
G	Goaltender
D	Defense
LW	Left wing
C	Center
RW	Right wing
F	Forward

== Draft picks ==
Full list of PWHL Detroit draft picks
Draft	Round	Pick	Player	Nationality	Pos	School/club team	Conference/league
2026	1	4	Laila Edwards	United States	D	University of Wisconsin	WCHA
2026	2	16	Sloane Matthews	United States	F	Ohio State University	WCHA
2026	3	28	Tia Chan	China	G	University of Connecticut	Hockey East
2026	4	40	Lily Shannon	United States	F	Northeastern University	Hockey East
2026	5	52	McKenna Van Gelder	Canada	F	Cornell University	ECAC
2026	6	64	Reichen Kirchmair	Canada	F	Providence University	Hockey East
