= List of Hamilton Havoc draft picks =

The Hamilton Havoc are a professional ice hockey team in the Professional Women's Hockey League (PWHL) that was founded ahead of the 2026–27 season as an expansion team. Their first draft pick was Nelli Laitinen, selected sixth overall in the 2026 PWHL Draft. Hamilton has participated in one PWHL Draft and have drafted six players.

== Key ==
General terms and abbreviations
Term or abbreviation	Definition
Draft	The year that the player was selected
Round	The round of the draft in which the player was selected
Pick	The overall position in the draft at which the player was selected
Pos	Position of the player

Position abbreviations
Abbreviation	Definition
G	Goaltender
D	Defense
LW	Left wing
C	Center
RW	Right wing
F	Forward

== Draft picks ==
Full list of PWHL Detroit draft picks
Draft	Round	Pick	Player	Nationality	Pos	School/club team	Conference/league
2026	1	6	Nelli Laitinen	Finland	D	University of Minnesota	WCHA
2026	2	18	Jade Iginla	Canada	F	Brown University	ECAC
2026	3	30	Elyssa Biederman	United States	F	Colgate University	ECAC
2026	4	42	Megan Woodworth	Canada	F	University of Connecticut	Hockey East
2026	5	54	Emma-Sofie Nordstrøm	Denmark Sweden	G	St. Lawrence University	ECAC
2026	6	66	Mya Vaslet	Canada	F	Penn State University	AHA
