= 2026–27 Detroit Clutch season =

Professional Women's Hockey League season

2026–27 Detroit Clutch
- League: TBD PWHL
- Conference: TBD West
- 2026–27 record: 0–0–0–0
- Home record: 0–0–0–0
- Road record: 0–0–0–0
- Goals for: 0
- Goals against: 0

Team information
- General manager: Manon Rhéaume
- Coach: Josh Sciba
- Captain: Hilary Knight
- Alternate captains: Jesse Compher; Daryl Watts
- Arena: Little Caesars Arena

Team leaders
- Goals: TBD

The 2026–27 Detroit Clutch season will be the team's first season as a member of the Professional Women's Hockey League (PWHL). They play their home games at Little Caesars Arena in Detroit. On November 18, 2026, the team named Hilary Knight as their inaugural captain, with Jesse Compher and Daryl Watts named alternate captains.

== Standings ==
=== Overall Standings ===
Pos	Team	Pld	W	OTW	OTL	L	GF	GA	GD	Pts
7	Seattle Torrent	0	0	0	0	0	0	0	0	0
8	Vancouver Goldeneyes	0	0	0	0	0	0	0	0	0
9	Detroit Clutch	0	0	0	0	0	0	0	0	0
10	Hamilton Havoc	0	0	0	0	0	0	0	0	0
11	Vegas Vanguards	0	0	0	0	0	0	0	0	0

Updated to match(es) played on December 5, 2026. Source: PWHL

=== Conference Standings ===
Pos	Team	Pld	W	OTW	OTL	L	GF	GA	GD	Pts
1	Minnesota Frost	0	0	0	0	0	0	0	0	0
2	Seattle Torrent	0	0	0	0	0	0	0	0	0
3	Vancouver Goldeneyes	0	0	0	0	0	0	0	0	0
4	Detroit Clutch	0	0	0	0	0	0	0	0	0
5	Vegas Vanguards	0	0	0	0	0	0	0	0	0
6	San Jose Sea Lions	0	0	0	0	0	0	0	0	0

Updated to match(es) played on December 5, 2026. Source: PWHL

== Schedule and results ==
=== Preseason ===
The PWHL preseason schedule was announced on September 10, 2026. Detroit will play the Ottawa Charge and Hamilton Havoc at the Morgan Firestone Arena.

Game log
Pre-season camp

Date	Opponent	Score	OT	Decision	Location	Box score/recap
November 23	Ottawa	–			Morgan Firestone Arena	
November 24	Hamilton	–			Morgan Firestone Arena	

=== Regular season ===
The regular season schedule was announced on October 2, 2026. The season will begin on December 5, 2026, and will end on April 18, 2027, with each team playing 30 games. For the 2026–27 season, the league has split teams into East and West conferences. The Eastern Conference will contain the Boston Fleet, Hamilton Havoc, Montreal Victoire, New York Sirens, Ottawa Charge, and Toronto Sceptres. The Western Conference will consist of Detroit Clutch, Minnesota Frost, San Jose Sea Lions, Seattle Torrent, Vancouver Goldeneyes and Vegas Vanguards.

Regular season schedule (Home: 0–0–0–0; Road: 0–0–0–0)
December: 0–0–0–0, 0 points (Home: 0–0–0–0; Road: 0–0–0–0)

Date	Opponent	Score	OT	Decision	Location	Attendance	Record	Points	Box Score
1	December 6	@ Las Vegas	–		T-Mobile Arena				
2	December 12	New York	–		Little Caesars Arena				
3	December 19	Vancouver	–		Little Caesars Arena				
4	December 23	@ Ottawa	–		Canadian Tire Centre				
5	December 28	Toronto	–		Little Caesars Arena				

January: 0–0–0–0, 0 points (Home: 0–0–0–0; Road: 0–0–0–0)

Date	Opponent	Score	OT	Decision	Location	Attendance	Record	Points	Box Score
6	January 5	@ Hamilton	–		TD Coliseum				
7	January 9	@ Minnesota	–		TBD				
8	January 17	@ Toronto	–		TBD				
9	January 20	Montreal	–		Little Caesars Arena				
10	January 23	@ New York	–		TBD				
11	January 30	San Jose	–		Little Caesars Arena				

February: 0–0–0–0, 0 points (Home: 0–0–0–0; Road: 0–0–0–0)

Date	Opponent	Score	OT	Decision	Location	Attendance	Record	Points	Box Score
12	February 4	Minnesota	–		Little Caesars Arena				
13	February 6	@ Boston	–		Agganis Arena				
14	February 13	@ Seattle	–		Climate Pledge Arena				
15	February 19	Hamilton	–		Little Caesars Arena				
16	February 21	@ San Jose	–		SAP Center				
17	February 24	Vancouver	–		Little Caesars Arena				
18	February 26	Las Vegas	–		Little Caesars Arena				
19	February 28	San Jose	–		TBD				

March: 0–0–0–0, 0 points (Home: 0–0–0–0; Road: 0–0–0–0)

Date	Opponent	Score	OT	Decision	Location	Attendance	Record	Points	Box Score
20	March 10	Las Vegas	–		TBD				
21	March 13	@ Seattle	–		TBD				
22	March 17	Ottawa	–		Little Caesars Arena				
23	March 20	@ Minnesota	–		Grand Casino Arena				
24	March 25	@ San Jose	–		SAP Center				
25	March 28	Seattle	–		Little Caesars Arena				

April: 0–0–0–0, 0 points (Home: 0–0–0–0; Road: 0–0–0–0)

Date	Opponent	Score	OT	Decision	Location	Attendance	Record	Points	Box Score
26	April 3	@ Montreal	–		TBD				
27	April 8	Boston	–		Little Caesars Arena				
28	April 11	Minnesota	–		Little Caesars Arena				
29	April 13	@ Las Vegas	–		Lee's Family Forum				
30	April 17	@ Vancouver	–		Pacific Coliseum				

Regulation Win (3 points) Overtime/Shootout win (2 points) Overtime/shootout loss (1 point) Regulation Loss (0 points)

== Transactions ==
=== Draft signings ===
The 2026 PWHL Draft was held on June 17, 2026.

Drafted prospect signings
Date	Player	Draft	Term	Ref.
August 14, 2026	Andrea Brändli	Second round, 15th overall	Three years	
August 14, 2026	Casey Borgiel	Second round, 22nd overall	One year	

=== Free agency ===
The free agency period began on June 2, 2026.

Free agent signings
Date	Player	Previous team	Term	Ref.
June 5, 2026	Daryl Watts	Toronto Sceptres	Four years (Note: Received an Expansion Foundational Offer (EFO))	
June 5, 2026	Cayla Barnes	Seattle Torrent	Three years	
June 5, 2026	Hannah Bilka	Seattle Torrent	Two years	
June 5, 2026	Britta Curl-Salemme	Minnesota Frost	Three years	
June 8, 2026	Jesse Compher	Toronto Sceptres	Three years	
June 10, 2026	Sydney Bard	Vancouver Goldeneyes	Two years	
June 11, 2026	Taylor Girard	New York Sirens	Two years	
June 14, 2026	Shiann Darkangelo	Montreal Victoire	Two years	
June 14, 2026	Nina Jobst-Smith	Vancouver Goldeneyes	One year	
June 15, 2026	Ella Huber	Boston Fleet	One year	
June 21, 2026	Mellissa Channell-Watkins	Vancouver Goldeneyes	Two years	
June 21, 2026	Stephanie Markowski	Ottawa Charge	Two years	
June 21, 2026	Mia Biotti	Boston Fleet	One year	
June 22, 2026	Alice Philbert	EV Bozen Eagles (EWHL)	Two years	
June 22, 2026	Olivia Wallin	Ottawa Charge	One year	
July 27, 2026	Akane Shiga	Luleå HF (SDHL)	Two years	
