= 2026–27 Vegas Vanguards season =

Professional Women's Hockey League season

2026–27 Vegas Vanguards
- League: TBD PWHL
- Conference: TBD West
- 2026–27 record: 0–0–0–0
- Home record: 0–0–0–0
- Road record: 0–0–0–0
- Goals for: 0
- Goals against: 0

Team information
- General manager: Dominique DiDia
- Coach: Kim Weiss
- Captain: Erin Ambrose
- Alternate captains: Hayley Scamurra; Tessa Janecke
- Arena: T-Mobile Arena

Team leaders
- Goals: TBD

The 2026–27 Vegas Vanguards season will be the team's first season as a member of the Professional Women's Hockey League (PWHL). They play their home games at T-Mobile Arena in Las Vegas, Nevada. On November 20, 2026 the team named Erin Ambrose captain, with Hayley Scamurra and Tessa Janecke serving as alternate captains.

== Offseason ==
On May 15, the PWHL announced the hiring of Dominique DiDia as Vegas Vanguards' first general manager. DiDia previously launched CAA Sports' women’s hockey department.

On June 15, Vegas Vanguards announced Kim Weiss as its inaugural head coach. Weiss, who was also DiDia's former teammate at Trinity College, most recently spent two seasons as an assistant coach for the Colorado Eagles, becoming the second woman in AHL/NHL history to serve as a full-time assistant coach (after Jessica Campbell).

== Standings ==
=== Overall Standings ===
Pos	Team	Pld	W	OTW	OTL	L	GF	GA	GD	Pts
8	Vancouver Goldeneyes	0	0	0	0	0	0	0	0	0
9	Detroit Clutch	0	0	0	0	0	0	0	0	0
10	Hamilton Havoc	0	0	0	0	0	0	0	0	0
11	Vegas Vanguards	0	0	0	0	0	0	0	0	0
12	San Jose Sea Lions	0	0	0	0	0	0	0	0	0

Updated to match(es) played on December 5, 2026. Source: PWHL

=== Conference Standings ===
Pos	Team	Pld	W	OTW	OTL	L	GF	GA	GD	Pts
1	Minnesota Frost	0	0	0	0	0	0	0	0	0
2	Seattle Torrent	0	0	0	0	0	0	0	0	0
3	Vancouver Goldeneyes	0	0	0	0	0	0	0	0	0
4	Detroit Clutch	0	0	0	0	0	0	0	0	0
5	Vegas Vanguards	0	0	0	0	0	0	0	0	0
6	San Jose Sea Lions	0	0	0	0	0	0	0	0	0

Updated to match(es) played on December 5, 2026. Source: PWHL

== Schedule and results ==
=== Preseason ===
The PWHL preseason schedule was announced on September 10, 2026. Las Vegas will play the Minnesota Frost and the Vancouver Goldeneyes in Las Vegas, Nevada at the America First Center.

Game log
Pre-season camp

Date	Opponent	Score	OT	Decision	Location	Box score/recap
November 22	Minnesota Frost	–			America First Center	
November 24	@ Vancouver	–			America First Center	

=== Regular season ===
The regular season schedule was announced on October 2, 2026. The season will begin on December 5, 2026, and will end on April 18, 2027, with each team playing 30 games. For the 2026–27 season, the league has split teams into East and West conferences. The Eastern Conference will contain the Boston Fleet, Hamilton Havoc, Montreal Victoire, New York Sirens, Ottawa Charge, and Toronto Sceptres. The Western Conference will consist of Detroit Clutch, Minnesota Frost, San Jose Sea Lions, Seattle Torrent, Vancouver Goldeneyes, and Vegas Vanguards.

All times in Eastern Time.

Regular season schedule (Home: 0–0–0–0; Road: 0–0–0–0)
December: 0–0–0–0, 0 points (Home: 0–0–0–0; Road: 0–0–0–0)

Game	Date	Opponent	Score	OT	Decision	Location	Attendance	Record	Points	Box Score
1	December 6	Detroit	–			T-Mobile Arena				
2	December 10	Minnesota	–			T-Mobile Arena				
3	December 12	@ Vancouver	–			Pacific Coliseum				
4	December 20	@ Seattle	–			Climate Pledge Arena				
5	December 26	Boston	–			T-Mobile Arena				
6	December 29	New York	–			T-Mobile Arena				

January: 0–0–0–0, 0 points (Home: 0–0–0–0; Road: 0–0–0–0)

Game	Date	Opponent	Score	OT	Decision	Location	Attendance	Record	Points	Box Score
7	January 3	@ Hamilton	–			TD Coliseum				
8	January 6	@ Montreal	–			Place Bell				
9	January 10	Ottawa	–			T-Mobile Arena				
10	January 13	@ San Jose	–			SAP Center				
11	January 16	Seattle	–			TBD				
12	January 21	Hamilton	–			T-Mobile Arena				
13	January 24	Toronto	–			T-Mobile Arena				
14	January 27	San Jose	–			T-Mobile Arena				

February: 0–0–0–0, 0 points (Home: 0–0–0–0; Road: 0–0–0–0)

Game	Date	Opponent	Score	OT	Decision	Location	Attendance	Record	Points	Box Score
15	February 2	@ Minnesota	–			Grand Casino Arena				
16	February 4	@ New York	–			Prudential Center				
17	February 7	@ Vancouver	–			TBD				
18	February 11	Seattle	–			T-Mobile Arena				
19	February 19	Vancouver	–			T-Mobile Arena				
20	February 23	Montreal	–			T-Mobile Arena				
21	February 26	@ Detroit	–			Little Caesars Arena				
22	February 28	@ Seattle	–			Climate Pledge Arena				

March: 0–0–0–0, 0 points (Home: 0–0–0–0; Road: 0–0–0–0)

Game	Date	Opponent	Score	OT	Decision	Location	Attendance	Record	Points	Box Score
23	March 10	@ Detroit	–			TBD				
24	March 19	@ Toronto	–			Coca-Cola Coliseum				
25	March 21	Vancouver	–			TBD				
26	March 24	@ Ottawa	–			Canadian Tire Centre				
27	March 27	@ Boston	–			Agganis Arena				

April: 0–0–0–0, 0 points (Home: 0–0–0–0; Road: 0–0–0–0)

Game	Date	Opponent	Score	OT	Decision	Location	Attendance	Record	Points	Box Score
28	April 7	San Jose	–			T-Mobile Arena				
29	April 13	Detroit	–			Lee's Family Forum				
30	April 16	@ Minnesota	–			Grand Casino Arena				

== Transactions ==
=== Draft signings ===
The 2026 PWHL Draft was held on June 17, 2026.

Drafted prospect signings
Date	Player	Draft	Term	Ref.
July 14, 2026	Tessa Janecke	First round, third overall	Two years	
October 5, 2026	Lacey Eden	First round, 5th overall	Two years	
October 6, 2026	Issy Wunder	Second round, 13th overall	Two years	
October 6, 2026	Josefin Bouveng	Third round, 29th overall	Two years	
October 6, 2026	Kendall Butze	Fifth round, 49th overall	Two years	
November 18, 2026	Saskia Maurer	Fourth round, 41st overall	Two years	

=== Free agent signings ===
The free agency period began on June 2, 2026.

Free agent signings
Date	Player	Previous team	Term	Ref.
June 6, 2026	Kendall Cooper	Minnesota Frost	Two years	
June 6, 2026	Mae Batherson	Minnesota Frost	Two years	
June 8, 2026	Erin Ambrose	Montreal Victoire	Two years	
June 8, 2026	Hayley Scamurra	Montreal Victoire	Three years	
June 8, 2026	Hilary Knight	Seattle Torrent	One year (Note: Received an Expansion Foundational Offer (EFO))	
June 10, 2026	Megan Carter	Seattle Torrent	Two years	
June 10, 2026	Nicole Hensley	Minnesota Frost	Two years	
June 12, 2026	Maureen Murphy	Montreal Victoire	One year	
June 15, 2026	Katy Knoll	Minnesota Frost	Two years	
June 20, 2026	Jada Habisch	Seattle Torrent	One year	
June 21, 2026	Natalie Snodgrass	Seattle Torrent	One year	
June 25, 2026	Madison Bizal	Minnesota Frost	One year	
June 25, 2026	Darcie Lappan	Vancouver Goldeneyes	Two years	
July 8, 2026	Sydney Langseth	Seattle Torrent	Two years	
