= 2026–27 Ottawa Charge season =

Professional Women's Hockey League season

2026–27 Ottawa Charge
- League: TBD PWHL
- Conference: TBD East
- 2026–27 record: 0–0–0–0
- Home record: 0–0–0–0
- Road record: 0–0–0–0
- Goals for: 0
- Goals against: 0

Team information
- General manager: Michael Hirshfeld
- Coach: Carla MacLeod
- Captain: Jocelyne Larocque
- Alternate captains: Gabbie Hughes Rebecca Leslie
- Arena: Canadian Tire Centre

Team leaders
- Goals: TBD

The 2026–27 Ottawa Charge season will be the team's fourth season as a member of the Professional Women's Hockey League (PWHL). They play their home games at the Canadian Tire Centre in Ottawa, Ontario.

The dates and locations of the 2026–27 PWHL Takeover Tour were announced on November 19, 2026.

== Standings ==
=== Overall Standings ===
Pos	Team	Pld	W	OTW	OTL	L	GF	GA	GD	Pts
1	Boston Fleet	0	0	0	0	0	0	0	0	0
2	Minnesota Frost	0	0	0	0	0	0	0	0	0
3	Montréal Victoire	0	0	0	0	0	0	0	0	0
4	New York Sirens	0	0	0	0	0	0	0	0	0
5	Ottawa Charge	0	0	0	0	0	0	0	0	0
6	Toronto Sceptres	0	0	0	0	0	0	0	0	0
7	Seattle Torrent	0	0	0	0	0	0	0	0	0
8	Vancouver Goldeneyes	0	0	0	0	0	0	0	0	0
9	Detroit Clutch	0	0	0	0	0	0	0	0	0
10	Hamilton Havoc	0	0	0	0	0	0	0	0	0
11	Vegas Vanguards	0	0	0	0	0	0	0	0	0
12	San Jose Sea Lions	0	0	0	0	0	0	0	0	0

Updated to match(es) played on December 5, 2026. Source: PWHL

=== Conference Standings ===
Pos	Team	Pld	W	OTW	OTL	L	GF	GA	GD	Pts
1	Boston Fleet	0	0	0	0	0	0	0	0	0
2	Montreal Victoire	0	0	0	0	0	0	0	0	0
3	New York Sirens	0	0	0	0	0	0	0	0	0
4	Ottawa Charge	0	0	0	0	0	0	0	0	0
5	Toronto Sceptres	0	0	0	0	0	0	0	0	0
6	Hamilton Havoc	0	0	0	0	0	0	0	0	0

Updated to match(es) played on December 5, 2026. Source: PWHL

== Schedule and results ==
=== Preseason ===
The PWHL preseason schedule was announced on September 10, 2026. The Charge will play PWHL Detroit on November 23rd in Hamilton at the Morgan Firestone Arena, and the Toronto Sceptres on November 24th in Toronto at the Mattamy Athletic Centre.

2026 preseason camp log
November: 0–0–0–0 (home: 0–0–0–0; road: 0–0–0–0)

Game	Date	Visitor	Score	Home	OT	Decision	Location	Attendance	Record	Box score
1	November 23	Detroit	–	Ottawa			Morgan Firestone Arena		0–0–0–0	
2	November 24	Ottawa	–	Toronto			Mattamy Athletic Centre		0–0–0–0	

Regulation Win (3 points) Overtime/Shootout Win (2 points) Overtime/Shootout Loss (1 point) Regulation Loss (0 points)

=== Regular season ===
The regular season schedule was announced on October 2, 2026. The season will begin on December 5, 2026, and will end on April 18, 2027, with each team playing 30 games. For the 2026–27 season, the league has split teams into East and West conferences. The Eastern Conference will contain the Boston Fleet, PWHL Hamilton, Montreal Victoire, New York Sirens, Ottawa Charge, and Toronto Sceptres. The Western Conference will consist of PWHL Detroit, PWHL Las Vegas, Minnesota Frost, PWHL San Jose, Seattle Torrent, and the Vancouver Goldeneyes.

Regular season schedule (Home: 0–0–0–0; Road: 0–0–0–0)
December: 0–0–0–0, 0 points (Home: 0–0–0–0; Road: 0–0–0–0)

Game	Date	Opponent	Score	OT	Decision	Location	Attendance	Record	Points	Box score
1	December 6	Toronto	–			Canadian Tire Centre				
2	December 9	@ Boston	–			Agganis Arena				
3	December 13	@ Hamilton	–			TD Coliseum				
4	December 15	San Jose	–			Canadian Tire Centre				
5	December 19	@ New York	–			Prudential Center				
6	December 23	Detroit	–			Canadian Tire Centre				
7	December 26	@ Montreal	–			Place Bell				

January: 0–0–0–0, 0 points (Home: 0–0–0–0; Road: 0–0–0–0)

Game	Date	Opponent	Score	OT	Decision	Location	Attendance	Record	Points	Box score
8	January 2	@ Boston	–			Capital One Arena				
9	January 5	@ Vancouver	–			Pacific Coliseum				
10	January 8	@ Seattle	–			Climate Pledge Arena				
11	January 10	@ Las Vegas	–			T-Mobile Arena				
12	January 17	Boston	–			Canadian Tire Centre				
13	January 19	Minnesota	–			Canadian Tire Centre				
14	January 27	New York	–			Canadian Tire Centre				

February: 0–0–0–0, 0 points (Home: 0–0–0–0; Road: 0–0–0–0)

Game	Date	Opponent	Score	OT	Decision	Location	Attendance	Record	Points	Box score
15	February 3	Hamilton	–			Scotiabank Centre				
16	February 6	Montreal	–			Canadian Tire Centre				
17	February 9	@ Toronto	–			Coca-Cola Coliseum				
18	February 15	@ Hamilton	–			Scotiabank Saddledome				
19	February 17	@ San Jose	–			SAP Center				
20	February 20	@ Minnesota	–			Grand Casino Arena				
21	February 24	Seattle	–			Canadian Tire Centre				
22	February 28	@ New York	–			Prudential Center				

March: 0–0–0–0, 0 points (Home: 0–0–0–0; Road: 0–0–0–0)

Game	Date	Opponent	Score	OT	Decision	Location	Attendance	Record	Points	Box score
23	March 12	New York	–			PeoplesBank Arena				
24	March 17	@ Detroit	–			Little Caesars Arena				
25	March 24	Las Vegas	–			Canadian Tire Centre				
26	March 26	Vancouver	–			Canadian Tire Centre				

April: 0–0–0–0, 0 points (Home: 0–0–0–0; Road: 0–0–0–0)

Game	Date	Opponent	Score	OT	Decision	Location	Attendance	Record	Points	Box score
27	April 3	Hamilton	–			Canadian Tire Centre				
28	April 9	@ Montreal	–			Place Bell				
29	April 13	Toronto	–			Canadian Tire Centre				
30	April 18	Montreal	–			Canadian Tire Centre				

Regulation Win (3 points) Overtime/Shootout Win (2 points) Overtime/Shootout Loss (1 point) Regulation Loss (0 points)

== Transactions ==
=== Draft signings ===
The 2026 PWHL Draft was held on June 17, 2026.

Drafted prospect signings
Date	Player	Draft	Term	Ref.
September 23, 2026	Vivian Jungels	First round, 11th overall (2026)	One year	

=== Free agent signings ===
The free agency period began on June 2, 2026.

Free agent signings
Date	Player	Previous team	Term	Ref.
June 20, 2026	Dara Greig	Montreal Victoire	Two years	

=== Contract extensions ===
Player contract extensions
Date	Player	Term	Ref.
June 18, 2026	Kateřina Mrázová	Two years	
June 18, 2026	Jocelyne Larocque	One year	
June 18, 2026	Kate Reilly	One year	
June 18, 2026	Kendra Woodland	One year	
June 19, 2026	Brooke Hobson	Two years	
June 19, 2026	Brooke McQuigge	One year	
June 25, 2026	Sanni Ahola	One year	
June 25, 2026	Vita Poniatovskaia	One year	
July 7, 2026	Rebecca Leslie	Two years	
July 8, 2026	Fanuza Kadirova	Two years	
July 10, 2026	Sarah Wozniewicz	Three years	
