= 2026–27 Minnesota Frost season =

Professional Women's Hockey League season

2026–27 Minnesota Frost
- League: TBD PWHL
- Conference: TBD West
- 2026–27 record: 0–0–0–0
- Home record: 0–0–0–0
- Road record: 0–0–0–0
- Goals for: 0
- Goals against: 0

Team information
- General manager: Melissa Caruso
- Coach: Ken Klee
- Captain: Kendall Coyne Schofield
- Alternate captains: Kelly Pannek; Lee Stecklein
- Arena: Grand Casino Arena

Team leaders
- Goals: TBD

The 2026–27 Minnesota Frost season will be the team's fourth season as a member of the Professional Women's Hockey League (PWHL). They play their home games at the Grand Casino Arena in Saint Paul, Minnesota.

== Standings ==
=== Overall Standings ===
Pos	Team	Pld	W	OTW	OTL	L	GF	GA	GD	Pts
1	Boston Fleet	0	0	0	0	0	0	0	0	0
2	Minnesota Frost	0	0	0	0	0	0	0	0	0
3	Montréal Victoire	0	0	0	0	0	0	0	0	0
4	New York Sirens	0	0	0	0	0	0	0	0	0
5	Ottawa Charge	0	0	0	0	0	0	0	0	0

Updated to match(es) played on December 5, 2026. Source: PWHL

=== Conference Standings ===
Pos	Team	Pld	W	OTW	OTL	L	GF	GA	GD	Pts
1	Minnesota Frost	0	0	0	0	0	0	0	0	0
2	Seattle Torrent	0	0	0	0	0	0	0	0	0
3	Vancouver Goldeneyes	0	0	0	0	0	0	0	0	0
4	Detroit Clutch	0	0	0	0	0	0	0	0	0
5	Vegas Vanguards	0	0	0	0	0	0	0	0	0
6	San Jose Sea Lions	0	0	0	0	0	0	0	0	0

Updated to match(es) played on December 5, 2026. Source: PWHL

== Schedule and results ==
=== Preseason ===
The PWHL preseason schedule was announced on September 10, 2026. The Frost will play PWHL Las Vegas and the Vancouver Goldeneyes in Las Vegas, Nevada at the America First Center.

Game log
Pre-season camp

Date	Opponent	Score	OT	Decision	Location	Box Score
November 22	@ Las Vegas	–			America First Center	
November 23	Vancouver	–			America First Center	

=== Regular season ===
The regular season schedule was announced on October 2, 2026. The season will begin on December 5, 2026, and will end on April 18, 2027, with each team playing 30 games. For the 2026–27 season, the league has split teams into East and West conferences. The Eastern Conference will contain the Boston Fleet, PWHL Hamilton, Montreal Victoire, New York Sirens, Ottawa Charge, and Toronto Sceptres. The Western Conference will consist of PWHL Detroit, PWHL Las Vegas, Minnesota Frost, PWHL San Jose, Seattle Torrent, and the Vancouver Goldeneyes.

Regular season schedule (Home: 0–0–0–0; Road: 0–0–0–0)
December: 0–0–0–0, 0 points (Home: 0–0–0–0; Road: 0–0–0–0)

Game	Date	Opponent	Score	OT	Decision	Location	Attendance	Record	Points	Box Score
1	December 5	@ San Jose	–			SAP Center				
2	December 10	@ Las Vegas	–			T-Mobile Arena				
3	December 13	Seattle	–			Grand Casino Arena				
4	December 17	Vancouver	–			Grand Casino Arena				
5	December 20	Montreal	–			Grand Casino Arena				
6	December 27	@ Seattle	–			Climate Pledge Arena				
7	December 31	Hamilton	–			Grand Casino Arena				

January: 0–0–0–0, 0 points (Home: 0–0–0–0; Road: 0–0–0–0)

Game	Date	Opponent	Score	OT	Decision	Location	Attendance	Record	Points	Box Score
8	January 3	San Jose	–			Grand Casino Arena				
9	January 9	Detroit	–			TBD				
10	January 16	@ New York	–			Prudential Center				
11	January 19	@ Ottawa	–			Canadian Tire Centre				
12	January 23	@ Vancouver	–			TBD				
13	January 29	Boston	–			Grand Casino Arena				

February: 0–0–0–0, 0 points (Home: 0–0–0–0; Road: 0–0–0–0)

Game	Date	Opponent	Score	OT	Decision	Location	Attendance	Record	Points	Box Score
14	February 2	Las Vegas	–			Grand Casino Arena				
15	February 4	@ Detroit	–			Little Caesars Arena				
16	February 6	San Jose	–			TBD				
17	February 10	@ Vancouver	–			Pacific Coliseum				
18	February 17	New York	–			Grand Casino Arena				
19	February 20	Ottawa	–			Grand Casino Arena				
20	February 27	@ Toronto	–			Coca-Cola Coliseum				

March: 0–0–0–0, 0 points (Home: 0–0–0–0; Road: 0–0–0–0)

Game	Date	Opponent	Score	OT	Decision	Location	Attendance	Record	Points	Box Score
21	March 12	@ Montreal	–			Place Bell				
22	March 14	@ Boston	–			Agganis Arena				
23	March 18	@ San Jose	–			SAP Center				
24	March 20	Detroit	–			Grand Casino Arena				
25	March 26	Seattle	–			Grand Casino Arena				
26	March 28	@ Hamilton	–			TD Coliseum				

April: 0–0–0–0, 0 points (Home: 0–0–0–0; Road: 0–0–0–0)

Game	Date	Opponent	Score	OT	Decision	Location	Attendance	Record	Points	Box Score
27	April 3	Toronto	–			Grand Casino Arena				
28	April 9	@ Seattle	–			TBD				
29	April 11	@ Detroit	–			Little Caesars Arena				
30	April 16	Las Vegas	–			Grand Casino Arena				

Regulation Win (3 points) Overtime/Shootout Win (2 points) Overtime/Shootout Loss (1 point) Regulation Loss (0 points)

== Transactions ==
=== Draft signings ===
The 2026 PWHL Draft was held on June 17, 2026.

Drafted prospect signings
Date	Player	Draft	Term	Ref.
August 3, 2026	Darya Gredzen	Fifth round, 57th overall (2026)	One year	

=== Contract extensions ===
Player contract extensions
Date	Player	Term	Ref.
June 3, 2026	Kelly Pannek	Three years	
June 3, 2026	Taylor Heise	Three years	
June 11, 2026	Lee Stecklein	Two years	
June 11, 2026	Grace Zumwinkle	Three years	
June 20, 2026	Claire Butorac	One year	
June 20, 2026	Klára Hymlárová	One year	
June 20, 2026	Sam Cogan	Two years	
June 20, 2026	Élizabeth Giguère	One year	
June 20, 2026	Peyton Anderson	One year	
June 20, 2026	Brooke Becker	One year	
July 6, 2026	Marlène Boissonnault	One year	
August 31, 2026	Kendall Coyne Schofield	Two years	
