= 2026–27 Toronto Sceptres season =

Professional Women's Hockey League season

2026–27 Toronto Sceptres
- League: TBD PWHL
- Conference: TBD East
- 2026–27 record: 0–0–0–0
- Home record: 0–0–0–0
- Road record: 0–0–0–0
- Goals for: 0
- Goals against: 0

Team information
- General manager: Gina Kingsbury
- Coach: Pascal Rhéaume
- Captain: Blayre Turnbull
- Arena: Coca-Cola Coliseum

Team leaders
- Goals: TBD

The 2026–27 Toronto Sceptres season will be the team's fourth season as a member of the Professional Women's Hockey League (PWHL). They play their home games at the Coca-Cola Coliseum in Toronto, Ontario.

== Standings ==
=== Overall Standings ===
Pos	Team	Pld	W	OTW	OTL	L	GF	GA	GD	Pts
4	New York Sirens	0	0	0	0	0	0	0	0	0
5	Ottawa Charge	0	0	0	0	0	0	0	0	0
6	Toronto Sceptres	0	0	0	0	0	0	0	0	0
7	Seattle Torrent	0	0	0	0	0	0	0	0	0
8	Vancouver Goldeneyes	0	0	0	0	0	0	0	0	0

Updated to match(es) played on December 5, 2026. Source: PWHL

=== Conference Standings ===
Pos	Team	Pld	W	OTW	OTL	L	GF	GA	GD	Pts
1	Boston Fleet	0	0	0	0	0	0	0	0	0
2	Montreal Victoire	0	0	0	0	0	0	0	0	0
3	New York Sirens	0	0	0	0	0	0	0	0	0
4	Ottawa Charge	0	0	0	0	0	0	0	0	0
5	Toronto Sceptres	0	0	0	0	0	0	0	0	0
6	Hamilton Havoc	0	0	0	0	0	0	0	0	0

Updated to match(es) played on December 5, 2026. Source: PWHL

== Schedule and results ==
=== Preseason ===
The PWHL preseason schedule was announced on September 10, 2026. The Sceptres will play PWHL Hamilton on November 23rd in Hamilton at the Morgan Firestone Arena, and the Ottawa Charge on November 24th in Toronto at the Mattamy Athletic Centre.

Game log
Pre-season camp

Date	Opponent	Score	OT	Decision	Location	Box Score
November 23	@ Hamilton	–			Morgan Firestone Arena	
November 24	Ottawa	–			Mattamy Athletic Centre	

=== Regular season ===
The regular season schedule was announced on October 2, 2026. The season will begin on December 5, 2026, and will end on April 18, 2027, with each team playing 30 games. For the 2026–27 season, the league has split teams into East and West conferences. The Eastern Conference will contain the Boston Fleet, PWHL Hamilton, Montreal Victoire, New York Sirens, Ottawa Charge, and Toronto Sceptres. The Western Conference will consist of PWHL Detroit, PWHL Las Vegas, Minnesota Frost, PWHL San Jose, Seattle Torrent, and the Vancouver Goldeneyes.

Regular season schedule (Home: 0–0–0–0; Road: 0–0–0–0)
December: 0–0–0–0, 0 points (Home: 0–0–0–0; Road: 0–0–0–0)

Game	Date	Opponent	Score	OT	Decision	Location	Attendance	Record	Points	Box Score
1	December 6	@ Ottawa	–							
2	December 8	Hamilton	–							
3	December 12	Boston	–							
4	December 20	San Jose	–							
5	December 22	New York	–							
6	December 26	@ Hamilton	–							
7	December 28	@ Detroit	–							

January: 0–0–0–0, 0 points (Home: 0–0–0–0; Road: 0–0–0–0)

Game	Date	Opponent	Score	OT	Decision	Location	Attendance	Record	Points	Box Score
8	January 3	Montreal	–							
9	January 7	Vancouver	–							
10	January 9	@ Boston	–							
11	January 17	Detroit	–							
12	January 22	@ San Jose	–							
13	January 24	@ Las Vegas	–							
14	January 28	@ Vancouver	–							
15	January 30	@ Hamilton	–							

February: 0–0–0–0, 0 points (Home: 0–0–0–0; Road: 0–0–0–0)

Game	Date	Opponent	Score	OT	Decision	Location	Attendance	Record	Points	Box Score
16	February 2	Boston	–							
17	February 9	Ottawa	–							
18	February 15	@ New York	–							
19	February 17	@ Montreal	–							
20	February 20	Seattle	–							
21	February 27	Minnesota	–							

March: 0–0–0–0, 0 points (Home: 0–0–0–0; Road: 0–0–0–0)

Game	Date	Opponent	Score	OT	Decision	Location	Attendance	Record	Points	Box Score
22	March 10	Hamilton	–							
23	March 19	Las Vegas	–							
24	March 27	@ Montreal	–							
25	March 31	@ Seattle	–							

April: 0–0–0–0, 0 points (Home: 0–0–0–0; Road: 0–0–0–0)

Game	Date	Opponent	Score	OT	Decision	Location	Attendance	Record	Points	Box Score
26	April 3	@ Minnesota	–							
27	April 7	Montreal	–							
28	April 10	New York	–							
29	April 13	@ Ottawa	–							
30	April 17	@ Boston	–							

Regulation Win (3 points) Overtime/Shootout win (2 points) Overtime/shootout loss (1 point) Regulation Loss (0 points)

== Transactions ==
=== Draft signings ===
The 2026 PWHL Draft was held on June 17, 2026.

Drafted prospect signings
Date	Player	Team	Draft	Term	Ref.
October 15, 2026	Kirsten Simms	Toronto Sceptres	First round, 8th overall	Three years	

=== Free agency ===
The free agency period began on June 2, 2026.

Free agent signings
Date	Player	Previous team	Term	Ref.
June 20, 2026	Jamie Lee Rattray	Boston Fleet	Two years	
July 6, 2026	Grace Campbell	Boston College (Hockey East)	One year	

=== Contract extensions ===
Player contract extensions
Date	Player	Team	Term	Ref.
June 3, 2026	Renata Fast	Toronto Sceptres	Three years	
June 3, 2026	Raygan Kirk	Toronto Sceptres	Three years	
June 11, 2026	Kali Flanagan	Toronto Sceptres	Three years	
June 19, 2026	Claire Dalton	Toronto Sceptres	Two years	
June 19, 2026	Allie Munroe	Toronto Sceptres	Two years	
June 19, 2026	Lauren Messier	Toronto Sceptres	One year	
June 19, 2026	Emma Woods	Toronto Sceptres	One year	
July 6, 2026	Jessica Kondas	Toronto Sceptres	One year	
October 6, 2026	Kiara Zanon	Toronto Sceptres	Two years	
October 20, 2026	Sara Hjalmarsson	Toronto Sceptres	Two years	
