= 2026–27 PWHL season =

- League: Professional Women's Hockey League
- Sport: Ice hockey
- Duration: December 5, 2026 – April 18, 2027
- Games: 30
- Teams: 12
- TV partner(s): Canada: CBC/Radio-Canada, Sportsnet, TSN/RDS, Prime Video; United States: Scripps Sports/Ion Television, KZJO, KMCC, MSG, NESN, WMYD

Draft
- Top draft pick: Caroline Harvey
- Picked by: Vancouver Goldeneyes

Regular season

PWHL seasons
- ← 2025–26 2027–28 →

The 2026–27 PWHL season will be the fourth season of operation of the Professional Women's Hockey League. The season will feature twelve teams, including new franchises in Detroit, Hamilton, Las Vegas, and San Jose.

== League business ==
- On May 6, 2026, the PWHL announced that their ninth team would be located in Detroit, Michigan and begin play in the 2026–27 season. The team will play their home games at Little Caesars Arena, which is the home arena of the NHL's Detroit Red Wings.
- On May 7, 2026, the PWHL announced that the 2026 PWHL Draft would be held June 17 at the Fox Theater in Detroit.
- On May 13, 2026, the PWHL announced that their tenth and eleventh teams would be located in Hamilton, Ontario and Las Vegas, Nevada, and will begin play in the 2026–27 season. They will play their home games at TD Coliseum (Hamilton Hammers) and T-Mobile Arena (Vegas Golden Knights) respectively.
- On May 19, 2026, the PWHL announced that their twelfth team would be located in San Jose, California and will begin play in the 2026–27 season. They will play their home games at the SAP Center, home of the NHL's San Jose Sharks.
- On October 29, 2026, the PWHL and PWHLPA altered their existing collective bargaining agreement to increase roster sizes, eliminate reserve roster spots, and increase league minimum salaries.

=== Front office changes ===
Front office changes
Off–season
Team	Previous general manager	New general manager	Notes
Detroit Clutch	—N/a	Manon Rhéaume	On May 15, 2026, the PWHL named Manon Rhéaume as general manager for the Clutch. She has previously worked for the Los Angeles Kings and Little Caesars AAA Hockey Club.
Hamilton Havoc	—N/a	Meghan Duggan	On May 22, 2026, the PWHL named Meghan Duggan as general manager for the Havoc. She most recently was Director of Player Development for the New Jersey Devils.
Vegas Vanguards	—N/a	Dominique DiDia	On May 15, 2026, the PWHL named Dominique DiDia as general manager for the Vanguards. She previously launched the women's hockey department for CAA Sports.
San Jose Sea Lions	—N/a	Troy Ryan	On May 22, 2026, the PWHL named Troy Ryan as general manager and head coach for the Sea Lions, a first for the league. Ryan was previously head coach of the Toronto Sceptres and the Canada women's national ice hockey team.
Vancouver Goldeneyes	Cara Gardner Morey	Alison Izzi	On July 30, 2026, the Goldeneyes announced that Morey had been named head coach, stepping down from her position as general manager. On September 22, the Goldeneyes named Alison Izzi as general manager

=== Coaching changes ===
Coaching changes
Off–season
Team	Previous head coach	New head coach	Notes
Seattle Torrent	Steve O'Rourke	Christine Bumstead	On May 22, 2026, Meghan Turner announced that Steve O'Rourke was no longer head coach of the Seattle Torrent. On June 11, 2026, Christine Bumstead was promoted to head coach. She was most recently an assistant coach for the Seattle Torrent.
Vancouver Goldeneyes	Brian Idalski	Cara Gardner Morey	On June 1, 2026, Cara Gardner Morey announced that Brian Idalski was relieved of his position as head coach of the Vancouver Goldeneyes. On July 30, 2026, the Goldeneyes announced that Morey had been named head coach, stepping down from her position as general manager.
Boston Fleet	Kris Sparre	François Méthot	On May 27, 2026, Hamilton Havoc announced that Kris Sparre had been hired as their first head coach in franchise history. On June 4, the Fleet announced that they had hired François Méthot as their next head coach.
Detroit Clutch	—N/a	Josh Sciba	On May 28, 2026, the PWHL named Josh Sciba as the first head coach in team history.
Hamilton Havoc	—N/a	Kris Sparre	On May 27, 2026, Hamilton Havoc announced that Kris Sparre had been hired as their first head coach in franchise history.
Vegas Vanguards	—N/a	Kim Weiss	On June 15, 2026, Vegas Vanguards announced that Kim Weiss had been hired as the first head coach in franchise history. Weiss most recently served as an assistant coach for the Colorado Eagles in the American Hockey League.
San Jose Sea Lions	—N/a	Troy Ryan	On May 22, 2026, the PWHL named Troy Ryan as general manager and head coach for the San Jose team, a first for the league. Ryan was previously head coach of the Toronto Sceptres and the Canada women's national ice hockey team.
Toronto Sceptres	Troy Ryan	Pascal Rhéaume	On May 22, 2026, the PWHL named Troy Ryan as general manager and head coach for the San Jose team. On June 10, 2026, Pascal Rhéaume was hired as their next head coach. He was most recently an assistant coach for the Bridgeport Islanders in the American Hockey League.

=== Arena changes ===
- On July 7, 2026, the Boston Fleet announced they will be moving to Boston full time, naming Agganis Arena as their primary home arena. The team previously played at the Tsongas Center in Lowell.
- On July 9, 2026, the Ottawa Charge announced that they named Canadian Tire Centre as their primary home arena. The team previously played at the TD Place Arena.

== Preseason ==
=== Preseason Schedule ===
The PWHL preseason schedule was announced on September 10, 2026. Preseason camps start on November 18, 2026, and will be held in Hamilton, Ontario; Las Vegas, Nevada; San Jose, California; Boston, Massachusetts; and Toronto, Ontario. Each camp will host two or three teams, with each playing two preseason games.

All times in Eastern Time.

Game log
Pre-season camp

Date	Time	Visitor	Score	Home	OT	Location	Box score/recap
November 22	9:50	Minnesota	–	Las Vegas		@ America First Center	
November 23	1:30	Detroit	–	Ottawa		@ Morgan Firestone Arena	
November 23	4:00	Vancouver	–	Minnesota		@ America First Center	
November 23	5:30	Toronto	–	Hamilton		@ Morgan Firestone Arena	
November 23	6:00	New York	–	Boston		@ Boston Sports Institute	
November 24	1:30	Hamilton	–	Detroit		@ Morgan Firestone Arena	
November 24	3:00	Las Vegas	–	Vancouver		@ America First Center	
November 24	4:00	Montreal	–	New York		@ Boston Sports Institute	
November 24	7:00	Ottawa	–	Toronto		@ Mattamy Athletic Centre	
November 25	1:00	Boston	–	Montreal		@ Boston Sports Institute	
November 29	8:00	Seattle	–	San Jose		@ Tech CU Arena	
November 30	4:00	San Jose	–	Seattle		@ Tech CU Arena	

== Regular season ==
=== Overall Standings ===
Pos	Team	Pld	W	OTW	OTL	L	GF	GA	GD	Pts
1	Boston Fleet	0	0	0	0	0	0	0	0	0
2	Minnesota Frost	0	0	0	0	0	0	0	0	0
3	Montréal Victoire	0	0	0	0	0	0	0	0	0
4	New York Sirens	0	0	0	0	0	0	0	0	0
5	Ottawa Charge	0	0	0	0	0	0	0	0	0
6	Toronto Sceptres	0	0	0	0	0	0	0	0	0
7	Seattle Torrent	0	0	0	0	0	0	0	0	0
8	Vancouver Goldeneyes	0	0	0	0	0	0	0	0	0
9	Detroit Clutch	0	0	0	0	0	0	0	0	0
10	Hamilton Havoc	0	0	0	0	0	0	0	0	0
11	Vegas Vanguards	0	0	0	0	0	0	0	0	0
12	San Jose Sea Lions	0	0	0	0	0	0	0	0	0

Updated to match(es) played on December 5, 2026. Source: PWHL

=== Western Conference Standings ===
Pos	Team	Pld	W	OTW	OTL	L	GF	GA	GD	Pts
1	Minnesota Frost	0	0	0	0	0	0	0	0	0
2	Seattle Torrent	0	0	0	0	0	0	0	0	0
3	Vancouver Goldeneyes	0	0	0	0	0	0	0	0	0
4	Detroit Clutch	0	0	0	0	0	0	0	0	0
5	Vegas Vanguards	0	0	0	0	0	0	0	0	0
6	San Jose Sea Lions	0	0	0	0	0	0	0	0	0

Updated to match(es) played on December 5, 2026. Source: PWHL

=== Eastern Conference Standings ===
Pos	Team	Pld	W	OTW	OTL	L	GF	GA	GD	Pts
1	Boston Fleet	0	0	0	0	0	0	0	0	0
2	Montreal Victoire	0	0	0	0	0	0	0	0	0
3	New York Sirens	0	0	0	0	0	0	0	0	0
4	Ottawa Charge	0	0	0	0	0	0	0	0	0
5	Toronto Sceptres	0	0	0	0	0	0	0	0	0
6	Hamilton Havoc	0	0	0	0	0	0	0	0	0

Updated to match(es) played on December 5, 2026. Source: PWHL

=== Schedule ===
The regular season schedule was announced on October 2, 2026. The season will begin on December 5, 2026, and will end on April 18, 2027, with each team playing 30 games. For the 2026–27 season, the league has split teams into East and West conferences. The Eastern Conference will contain the Boston Fleet, Hamilton Havoc, Montreal Victoire, New York Sirens, Ottawa Charge, and Toronto Sceptres. The Western Conference will consist of the Detroit Clutch, Minnesota Frost, San Jose Sea Lions, Seattle Torrent, Vancouver Goldeneyes and Vegas Vanguards. The PWHL Takeover Tour returned for the 2026-27 season, with 24 neutral site games played in 19 North American cities.

All times in Eastern Time.

Game log
December

Date	Time	Visitor	Score	Home	OT	Notes	Recap
December 5	3:00	Seattle	–	Vancouver			
December 5	7:00	Hamilton	–	Montreal			
December 5	7:00	Minnesota	–	San Jose			
December 6	2:00	Toronto	–	Ottawa			
December 6	3:00	Boston	–	New York			
December 6	8:00	Detroit	–	Las Vegas			
December 8	7:00	Hamilton	–	Toronto			
December 9	7:00	Ottawa	–	Boston			
December 9	10:00	Seattle	–	San Jose			
December 10	10:00	Minnesota	–	Las Vegas			
December 12	12:00	New York	–	Detroit			
December 12	2:00	San Jose	–	Montreal			
December 12	7:00	Boston	–	Toronto			
December 12	9:00	Las Vegas	–	Vancouver			
December 13	2:00	Seattle	–	Minnesota			
December 13	2:00	Ottawa	–	Hamilton			
December 15	7:00	San Jose	–	Ottawa			
December 16	7:00	Montreal	–	Boston			
December 17	7:00	San Jose	–	Hamilton			
December 17	7:00	Vancouver	–	Minnesota			
December 19	2:00	Vancouver	–	Detroit			
December 19	7:00	Ottawa	–	New York			
December 20	2:00	Montreal	–	Minnesota			
December 20	4:00	San Jose	–	Toronto			
December 20	7:00	Las Vegas	–	Seattle			
December 22	7:00	New York	–	Toronto			
December 22	9:30	Boston	–	Vancouver			
December 23	7:00	Detroit	–	Ottawa			
December 23	10:00	Boston	–	Seattle			
December 26	2:00	Ottawa	–	Montreal			
December 26	7:00	Toronto	–	Hamilton			
December 26	7:00	Boston	–	Las Vegas			
December 27	4:00	New York	–	San Jose			
December 27	7:00	Minnesota	–	Seattle			
December 28	7:00	Toronto	–	Detroit			
December 29	7:00	Hamilton	–	Montreal			
December 29	10:00	New York	–	Las Vegas			
December 30	10:00	Boston	–	San Jose			
December 31	5:00	New York	–	Seattle			
December 31	8:00	Hamilton	–	Minnesota			

January

Date	Time	Visitor	Score	Home	OT	Notes	Recap
January 2	12:00	Ottawa	–	Boston		@ Capital One Arena (Washington, D.C.)	
January 2	7:00	New York	–	Vancouver			
January 3	2:00	San Jose	–	Minnesota			
January 3	3:00	Las Vegas	–	Hamilton			
January 3	6:00	Montreal	–	Toronto			
January 5	7:00	Detroit	–	Hamilton			
January 5	9:30	Ottawa	–	Vancouver			
January 6	7:00	Las Vegas	–	Montreal			
January 7	7:00	Vancouver	–	Toronto			
January 8	10:00	Ottawa	–	Seattle			
January 9	2:00	Toronto	–	Boston			
January 9	7:00	Detroit	–	Minnesota		@ United Center (Chicago)	
January 10	2:00	Hamilton	–	New York			
January 10	5:00	Ottawa	–	Las Vegas			
January 10	8:30	Montreal	–	Seattle			
January 12	9:00	Montreal	–	Vancouver			
January 13	7:00	New York	–	Boston			
January 13	10:00	Las Vegas	–	San Jose			
January 14	10:00	Hamilton	–	Seattle			
January 16	12:00	Minnesota	–	New York			
January 16	3:00	Hamilton	–	Vancouver			
January 16	3:00	Seattle	–	Las Vegas		@ Bridgestone Arena (Nashville)	
January 16	7:00	Montreal	–	San Jose			
January 17	1:00	Boston	–	Ottawa			
January 17	3:30	Detroit	–	Toronto		@ Scotiabank Arena	
January 19	7:00	Minnesota	–	Ottawa			
January 19	10:00	Hamilton	–	San Jose			
January 20	7:00	Montreal	–	Detroit			
January 21	10:00	Hamilton	–	Las Vegas			
January 22	10:00	Toronto	–	San Jose			
January 23	2:00	Boston	–	Montreal		@ Videotron Centre (Quebec City)	
January 23	7:00	Minnesota	–	Vancouver		@ Rogers Place (Edmonton)	
January 23	7:00	Detroit	–	New York		@ Madison Square Garden	
January 24	2:00	Seattle	–	San Jose		@ PPG Paints Arena (Pittsburgh)	
January 24	4:00	Toronto	–	Las Vegas			
January 26	7:00	Boston	–	Hamilton			
January 27	7:00	New York	–	Ottawa			
January 27	7:00	San Jose	–	Las Vegas			
January 28	7:00	Seattle	–	Hamilton			
January 28	9:30	Toronto	–	Vancouver			
January 29	7:00	Boston	–	Minnesota			
January 30	2:00	Toronto	–	Hamilton		@ SaskTel Centre (Saskatoon)	
January 30	7:00	San Jose	–	Detroit			
January 31	1:00	Montreal	–	New York		@ Benchmark International Arena (Tampa)	

February

Date	Time	Visitor	Score	Home	OT	Notes	Recap
February 2	6:30	Boston	–	Toronto		@ Scotiabank Centre (Halifax)	
February 2	7:00	Las Vegas	–	Minnesota			
February 3	6:30	Hamilton	–	Ottawa		@ Scotiabank Centre (Halifax)	
February 4	7:00	Minnesota	–	Detroit			
February 4	7:00	Las Vegas	–	New York			
February 4	10:00	Vancouver	–	Seattle			
February 6	12:30	San Jose	–	Minnesota		@ Lenovo Center (Raleigh)	
February 6	2:00	Montreal	–	Ottawa			
February 6	7:00	Detroit	–	Boston			
February 7	3:30	Seattle	–	New York			
February 7	6:00	Las Vegas	–	Vancouver		@ Ball Arena (Denver)	
February 9	7:00	Ottawa	–	Toronto			
February 9	7:00	San Jose	–	New York			
February 10	7:00	Boston	–	Hamilton			
February 10	9:30	Minnesota	–	Vancouver			
February 11	10:00	Seattle	–	Las Vegas			
February 12	7:00	Boston	–	Montreal			
February 13	1:00	Vancouver	–	San Jose		@ Xfinity Mobile Arena (Philadelphia)	
February 13	3:00	Detroit	–	Seattle			
February 15	2:00	Toronto	–	New York			
February 15	5:00	Ottawa	–	Hamilton		@ Scotiabank Saddledome (Calgary)	
February 17	7:00	Toronto	–	Montreal			
February 17	7:00	New York	–	Minnesota			
February 17	7:00	Seattle	–	Boston			
February 17	10:00	Ottawa	–	San Jose			
February 19	7:00	Hamilton	–	Detroit			
February 19	10:00	Vancouver	–	Las Vegas			
February 20	3:00	Montreal	–	Boston		@ Crypto.com Arena (Los Angeles)	
February 20	7:00	Seattle	–	Toronto			
February 20	7:00	Ottawa	–	Minnesota			
February 21	7:00	Detroit	–	San Jose			
February 23	7:00	New York	–	Hamilton			
February 23	10:00	Montreal	–	Las Vegas			
February 24	7:00	Vancouver	–	Detroit			
February 24	7:00	Seattle	–	Ottawa			
February 26	7:00	Las Vegas	–	Detroit			
February 27	2:00	Minnesota	–	Toronto			
February 27	7:00	Vancouver	–	Boston			
February 28	1:00	Montreal	–	Hamilton			
February 28	2:00	San Jose	–	Detroit		@ Nationwide Arena (Columbus)	
February 28	7:00	Ottawa	–	New York			
February 28	7:00	Las Vegas	–	Seattle			

March

Date	Time	Visitor	Score	Home	OT	Notes	Recap
March 9	7:00	New York	–	Montreal			
March 10	7:00	Hamilton	–	Toronto			
March 10	7:00	Las Vegas	–	Detroit		@ Capital One Arena (Washington, D.C.)	
March 10	9:30	Seattle	–	Vancouver			
March 12	7:00	New York	–	Ottawa		@ PeoplesBank Arena (Hartford)	
March 12	7:00	Minnesota	–	Montreal			
March 13	3:00	San Jose	–	Vancouver			
March 13	3:00	Detroit	–	Seattle		@ Amerant Bank Arena (Sunrise)	
March 14	1:00	Hamilton	–	New York		@ KeyBank Center (Buffalo)	
March 14	1:00	Minnesota	–	Boston			
March 16	7:00	Vancouver	–	Montreal			
March 17	7:00	Ottawa	–	Detroit			
March 18	10:00	Minnesota	–	San Jose			
March 19	7:00	Las Vegas	–	Toronto			
March 20	3:00	Detroit	–	Minnesota			
March 21	1:00	San Jose	–	Boston			
March 21	2:00	Montreal	–	New York			
March 21	4:30	Vancouver	–	Las Vegas		@ Scotiabank Centre (Halifax)	
March 23	7:00	Seattle	–	Montreal			
March 24	TBA	Las Vegas	–	Ottawa			
March 24	7:00	Vancouver	–	Hamilton			
March 25	10:00	Detroit	–	San Jose			
March 26	7:00	Vancouver	–	Ottawa			
March 26	7:00	Seattle	–	Minnesota			
March 27	2:00	Toronto	–	Montreal		@ Canada Life Centre (Winnipeg)	
March 27	3:00	Las Vegas	–	Boston			
March 28	2:00	Minnesota	–	Hamilton			
March 28	2:00	Seattle	–	Detroit			
March 28	5:00	Vancouver	–	New York			
March 31	10:00	Toronto	–	Seattle			

April

Date	Time	Visitor	Score	Home	OT	Notes	Recap
April 1	10:00	San Jose	–	Vancouver			
April 3	2:00	Hamilton	–	Ottawa			
April 3	3:00	Toronto	–	Minnesota			
April 3	7:00	Detroit	–	Montreal			
April 3	7:30	Boston	–	New York			
April 6	9:00	Vancouver	–	Seattle			
April 7	7:00	Montreal	–	Toronto			
April 7	10:00	San Jose	–	Las Vegas			
April 8	7:00	Boston	–	Detroit			
April 9	7:30	Ottawa	–	Montreal			
April 9	9:00	Minnesota	–	Seattle		@ Ball Arena (Denver)	
April 9	10:00	Vancouver	–	San Jose			
April 10	3:00	Hamilton	–	Boston			
April 10	7:30	New York	–	Toronto		@ Xfinity Mobile Arena (Philadelphia)	
April 11	1:00	Minnesota	–	Detroit			
April 13	7:00	Toronto	–	Ottawa			
April 13	10:00	Detroit	–	Las Vegas			
April 14	7:00	New York	–	Boston			
April 16	TBA	Las Vegas	–	Minnesota			
April 17	TBA	Toronto	–	Boston			
April 17	TBA	San Jose	–	Seattle			
April 17	TBA	Detroit	–	Vancouver			
April 18	TBA	New York	–	Hamilton			
April 18	TBA	Montreal	–	Ottawa			

== Transactions ==
=== Draft ===
The 2026 PWHL Draft was held on June 17, 2026.

Drafted prospect signings
Date	Player	Team	Draft	Term	Ref.
July 14, 2026	Tessa Janecke	Vegas Vanguards	First round, third overall (2026)	Two years	
August 3, 2026	Leah Stecker	Boston Fleet	Third round, 27th overall (2026)	Three years	
August 3, 2026	Darya Gredzen	Minnesota Frost	Fifth round, 57th overall (2026)	One year	
August 14, 2026	Andrea Brändli	Detroit Clutch	Second round, 15th overall (2026)	Three years	
August 14, 2026	Casey Borgiel	Detroit Clutch	Second round, 22nd overall (2026)	One year	
September 1, 2026	Katie DeSa	Vancouver Goldeneyes	Fourth round, 37th overall (2026)	One year	
September 14, 2026	Laila Edwards	San Jose Sea Lions	First round, 4th overall (2026)	Three years	
September 22, 2026	Sloane Matthews	San Jose Sea Lions	Second round, 16th overall (2026)	Three years	
September 22, 2026	Tia Chan	San Jose Sea Lions	Third round, 28th overall (2026)	Three years	
September 23, 2026	Vivian Jungels	Ottawa Charge	First round, 11th overall (2026)	One year	
September 23, 2026	Lily Shannon	San Jose Sea Lions	Fourth round, 40th overall (2026)	Two years	
September 23, 2026	McKenna Van Gelder	San Jose Sea Lions	Fifth round, 52nd overall (2026)	Two years	
September 23, 2026	Abbey Murphy	Seattle Torrent	First round, 2nd overall (2026)	Two years	
September 29, 2026	Caroline Harvey	Vancouver Goldeneyes	First round, 1st overall (2026)	Three years	
September 30, 2026	Grace Dwyer	Boston Fleet	First round, 10th overall (2026)	Three years	
October 5, 2026	Lacey Eden	Vegas Vanguards	First round, 5th overall	Two years	
October 5, 2026	Nelli Laitinen	Hamilton Havoc	First round, 6th overall (2026)	Three years	
October 6, 2026	Jade Iginla	Hamilton Havoc	Second round, 18th overall (2026)	One year	
October 6, 2026	Issy Wunder	Vegas Vanguards	Second round, 13th overall (2026)	Two years	
October 6, 2026	Josefin Bouveng	Vegas Vanguards	Third round, 29th overall (2026)	Two years	
October 6, 2026	Kendall Butze	Vegas Vanguards	Fifth round, 49th overall (2026)	Two years	
October 15, 2026	Kirsten Simms	Toronto Sceptres	First round, 8th overall	Three years	
October 21, 2026	Sydney Morrow	Seattle Torrent	Second round, 14th overall	Two years	
November 4, 2026	Emma Peschel	New York Sirens	First round, 7th overall	Three years	
November 17, 2026	Saskia Maurer	Vegas Vanguards	Fourth round, 41st overall	Two years	

=== Free agency ===
The free agency period began on June 2, 2026.

Free agent signings
Date	Player	New team	Previous team	Term	Ref.
June 5, 2026	Brianne Jenner	Hamilton Havoc	Ottawa Charge	Three years	
June 5, 2026	Kayle Osborne	Hamilton Havoc	New York Sirens	Three years	
June 5, 2026	Daryl Watts	Detroit Clutch	Toronto Sceptres	Four years (Note: Received an Expansion Foundational Offer (EFO))	
June 5, 2026	Cayla Barnes	Detroit Clutch	Seattle Torrent	Three years	
June 5, 2026	Hannah Bilka	Detroit Clutch	Seattle Torrent	Two years	
June 5, 2026	Corinne Schroeder	San Jose Sea Lions	Seattle Torrent	Two years	
June 5, 2026	Britta Curl-Salemme	Detroit Clutch	Minnesota Frost	Three years	
June 5, 2026	Rory Guilday	San Jose Sea Lions	Ottawa Charge	Two years	
June 6, 2026	Alina Müller	Hamilton Havoc	Boston Fleet	Three years	
June 6, 2026	Nicole Gosling	Hamilton Havoc	Montreal Victoire	Three years	
June 6, 2026	Anne Cherkowski	San Jose Sea Lions	New York Sirens	Two years	
June 6, 2026	Kristin O'Neill	San Jose Sea Lions	New York Sirens	Two years	
June 6, 2026	Kendall Cooper	Vegas Vanguards	Minnesota Frost	Two years	
June 6, 2026	Mae Batherson	Vegas Vanguards	Minnesota Frost	Two years	
June 7, 2026	Emily Clark	Hamilton Havoc	Ottawa Charge	Two years	
June 8, 2026	Jesse Compher	Detroit Clutch	Toronto Sceptres	Three years	
June 8, 2026	Erin Ambrose	Vegas Vanguards	Montreal Victoire	Two years	
June 8, 2026	Hayley Scamurra	Vegas Vanguards	Montreal Victoire	Three years	
June 8, 2026	Maddi Wheeler	San Jose Sea Lions	New York Sirens	Two years	
June 8, 2026	Hilary Knight	Vegas Vanguards	Seattle Torrent	One year	
June 10, 2026	Megan Carter	Vegas Vanguards	Seattle Torrent	Two years	
June 10, 2026	Hadley Hartmetz	San Jose Sea Lions	Boston Fleet	Two years	
June 10, 2026	Sydney Bard	Detroit Clutch	Vancouver Goldeneyes	Two years	
June 10, 2026	Nicole Hensley	Vegas Vanguards	Minnesota Frost	Two years	
June 11, 2026	Zoe Boyd	Hamilton Havoc	Boston Fleet	Two years	
June 11, 2026	Maggie Connors	San Jose Sea Lions	Toronto Sceptres	Two years	
June 11, 2026	Taylor Girard	Detroit Clutch	New York Sirens	Two years	
June 12, 2026	Mariah Keopple	San Jose Sea Lions	Seattle Torrent	Two years	
June 12, 2026	Maureen Murphy	Vegas Vanguards	Montreal Victoire	One year	
June 14, 2026	Shiann Darkangelo	Detroit Clutch	Montreal Victoire	Two years	
June 14, 2026	Natálie Mlýnková	San Jose Sea Lions	Montreal Victoire	One year	
June 14, 2026	Riley Brengman	Hamilton Havoc	Boston Fleet	Two years	
June 14, 2026	Allyson Simpson	Hamilton Havoc	New York Sirens	Two years	
June 14, 2026	Abby Hustler	Hamilton Havoc	Minnesota Frost	Two years	
June 14, 2026	Nina Jobst-Smith	Detroit Clutch	Vancouver Goldeneyes	One year	
June 14, 2026	Daniela Pejšová	San Jose Sea Lions	Boston Fleet	Two years	
June 15, 2026	Katy Knoll	Vegas Vanguards	Minnesota Frost	Two years	
June 15, 2026	Ella Huber	Detroit Clutch	Boston Fleet	One year	
June 20, 2026	Peyton Hemp	Hamilton Havoc	Ottawa Charge	One year	
June 20, 2026	Jamie Lee Rattray	Toronto Sceptres	Boston Fleet	Two years	
June 20, 2026	Dara Greig	Ottawa Charge	Montreal Victoire	Two years	
June 20, 2026	Jessie Eldridge	Montreal Victoire	Boston Fleet	Two years	
June 20, 2026	Jada Habisch	Vegas Vanguards	Seattle Torrent	One year	
June 20, 2026	Amanda Boulier	Boston Fleet	Montreal Victoire	Two years	
June 20, 2026	Taylor House	Boston Fleet	Ottawa Charge	One year	
June 21, 2026	Alexa Vasko	Hamilton Havoc	Ottawa Charge	Two years	
June 21, 2026	Kayla Vespa	Hamilton Havoc	New York Sirens	Two years	
June 21, 2026	Elaine Chuli	New York Sirens	Toronto Sceptres	Two years	
June 21, 2026	Dominika Lásková	Vancouver Goldeneyes	Montreal Victoire	One year	
June 21, 2026	Mellissa Channell-Watkins	Detroit Clutch	Vancouver Goldeneyes	Two years	
June 21, 2026	Stephanie Markowski	Detroit Clutch	Ottawa Charge	Two years	
June 21, 2026	Mia Biotti	Detroit Clutch	Boston Fleet	One year	
June 21, 2026	Abbey Levy	San Jose Sea Lions	Boston Fleet	One year	
June 21, 2026	Kristin Della Rovere	San Jose Sea Lions	Toronto Sceptres	One year	
June 21, 2026	Natalie Snodgrass	Vegas Vanguards	Seattle Torrent	One year	
June 21, 2026	Emma Nuutinen	Seattle Torrent	Kiekko-Espoo (Auroraliiga)	One year	
June 22, 2026	Alice Philbert	Detroit Clutch	EV Bozen Eagles (EWHL)	Two years	
June 22, 2026	Olivia Wallin	Detroit Clutch	Ottawa Charge	One year	
June 23, 2026	Emma Maltais	Montreal Victoire	Toronto Sceptres	Two years	
June 23, 2026	Noemi Neubauerová	Seattle Torrent	Boston Fleet	One year	
June 25, 2026	Madison Bizal	Vegas Vanguards	Minnesota Frost	One year	
June 25, 2026	Darcie Lappan	Vegas Vanguards	Vancouver Goldeneyes	Two years	
June 26, 2026	Anna Kjellbin	Hamilton Havoc	Toronto Sceptres	One year	
July 6, 2026	Grace Campbell	Toronto Sceptres	Boston College (Hockey East)	One year	
July 8, 2026	Brooke Bryant	San Jose Sea Lions	Seattle Torrent	One year	
July 8, 2026	Sydney Langseth	Vegas Vanguards	Seattle Torrent	Two years	
July 10, 2026	Anna Shokhina	Hamilton Havoc	Toronto Sceptres	One year	
July 14, 2026	Laura Fuoco	Vancouver Goldeneyes	EV Zug Women (SWHL-A)	One year	
July 23, 2026	Makenna Webster	New York Sirens	United States women's national field hockey team	Three years	
July 23, 2026	Michelle Karvinen	Montreal Victoire	Vancouver Goldeneyes	One year	
July 27, 2026	Akane Shiga	Detroit Clutch	Luleå HF (SDHL)	Two years	
November 18, 2026	Sandra Abstreiter	San Jose Sea Lions	Montreal Victoire	One year	

=== Contract extensions/terminations ===
Player contract extensions
Date	Player	Team	Term	Ref.
June 2, 2026	Alex Carpenter	Seattle Torrent	Three years	
June 2, 2026	Sarah Nurse	Vancouver Goldeneyes	Two years	
June 3, 2026	Renata Fast	Toronto Sceptres	Three years	
June 3, 2026	Raygan Kirk	Toronto Sceptres	Three years	
June 3, 2026	Kelly Pannek	Minnesota Frost	Three years	
June 3, 2026	Taylor Heise	Minnesota Frost	Three years	
June 10, 2026	Julia Gosling	Seattle Torrent	Two years	
June 10, 2026	Susanna Tapani	Boston Fleet	Two years	
June 10, 2026	Maggie Flaherty	Montreal Victoire	Two years	
June 10, 2026	Jenn Gardiner	Vancouver Goldeneyes	Three years	
June 10, 2026	Izzy Daniel	Vancouver Goldeneyes	Two years	
June 11, 2026	Kali Flanagan	Toronto Sceptres	Three years	
June 11, 2026	Lee Stecklein	Minnesota Frost	Two years	
June 11, 2026	Grace Zumwinkle	Minnesota Frost	Three years	
June 17, 2026	Aneta Tejralová	Seattle Torrent	Two years	
June 17, 2026	Emily Brown	Seattle Torrent	Two years	
June 17, 2026	Theresa Schafzahl	Seattle Torrent	Two years	
June 17, 2026	Abby Roque	Montreal Victoire	Two years	
June 18, 2026	Sophie Shirley	Boston Fleet	Two years	
June 18, 2026	Jill Saulnier	Boston Fleet	Two years	
June 18, 2026	Kateřina Mrázová	Ottawa Charge	Two years	
June 18, 2026	Jocelyne Larocque	Ottawa Charge	One year	
June 18, 2026	Kate Reilly	Ottawa Charge	One year	
June 18, 2026	Kendra Woodland	Ottawa Charge	One year	
June 19, 2026	Olivia Mobley	Boston Fleet	One year	
June 19, 2026	Amanda Thiele	Boston Fleet	One year	
June 19, 2026	Mannon McMahon	Vancouver Goldeneyes	Two years	
June 19, 2026	Gabby Rosenthal	Vancouver Goldeneyes	One year	
June 19, 2026	Claire Dalton	Toronto Sceptres	Two years	
June 19, 2026	Nadia Mattivi	Montreal Victoire	Three years	
June 19, 2026	Kaitlin Willoughby	Montreal Victoire	Two years	
June 19, 2026	Carly Jackson	Seattle Torrent	Two years	
June 19, 2026	Anna Bargman	New York Sirens	Two years	
June 19, 2026	Nicole Vallario	New York Sirens	Two years	
June 19, 2026	Callie Shanahan	New York Sirens	Two years	
June 19, 2026	Dayle Ross	New York Sirens	One year	
June 19, 2026	Kaley Doyle	New York Sirens	One year	
June 19, 2026	Brooke Hobson	Ottawa Charge	Two years	
June 19, 2026	Brooke McQuigge	Ottawa Charge	One year	
June 19, 2026	Allie Munroe	Toronto Sceptres	Two years	
June 19, 2026	Lauren Messier	Toronto Sceptres	One year	
June 19, 2026	Emma Woods	Toronto Sceptres	One year	
June 20, 2026	Loren Gabel	Boston Fleet	One year	
June 20, 2026	Laura Kluge	Boston Fleet	Two years	
June 20, 2026	Jade Downie-Landry	Montreal Victoire	Two years	
June 20, 2026	Alexandra Labelle	Montreal Victoire	One year	
June 20, 2026	Claire Butorac	Minnesota Frost	One year	
June 20, 2026	Klára Hymlárová	Minnesota Frost	One year	
June 20, 2026	Gabrielle David	Seattle Torrent	Two years	
June 20, 2026	Rylind MacKinnon	Boston Fleet	One year	
June 20, 2026	Sam Cogan	Minnesota Frost	Two years	
June 20, 2026	Élizabeth Giguère	Minnesota Frost	One year	
June 20, 2026	Peyton Anderson	Minnesota Frost	One year	
June 20, 2026	Brooke Becker	Minnesota Frost	One year	
June 20, 2026	Lauren Bernard	New York Sirens	Two years	
June 20, 2026	Clair DeGeorge	New York Sirens	One year	
June 20, 2026	Denisa Křížová	New York Sirens	One year	
June 21, 2026	Katie Chan	Vancouver Goldeneyes	Two years	
June 23, 2026	Lily Delianedis	Seattle Torrent	One year	
June 23, 2026	Lyndie Lobdell	Seattle Torrent	One year	
June 23, 2026	Tamara Giaquinto	Montreal Victoire	One year	
June 23, 2026	Megan Warrener	Montreal Victoire	One year	
June 25, 2026	Hilary Knight	Detroit Clutch	Three years	
June 25, 2026	Sanni Ahola	Ottawa Charge	One year	
June 25, 2026	Vita Poniatovskaia	Ottawa Charge	One year	
July 6, 2026	Jessica Kondas	Toronto Sceptres	One year	
July 6, 2026	Marlène Boissonnault	Minnesota Frost	One year	
July 7, 2026	Rebecca Leslie	Ottawa Charge	Two years	
July 8, 2026	Fanuza Kadirova	Ottawa Charge	Two years	
July 10, 2026	Sarah Wozniewicz	Ottawa Charge	Three years	
July 14, 2026	Haley Winn	Boston Fleet	Three years	
July 15, 2026	Abby Newhook	Boston Fleet	Two years	
August 31, 2026	Kendall Coyne Schofield	Minnesota Frost	Two years	
September 2, 2026	Paetyn Levis	New York Sirens	Two years	
September 8, 2026	Maddy Samoskevich	Vancouver Goldeneyes	One year	
September 30, 2026	Casey O'Brien	New York Sirens	Two years	
October 6, 2026	Skylar Irving	Montreal Victoire	One year	
October 6, 2026	Kiara Zanon	Toronto Sceptres	Two years	
October 13, 2026	Denisa Křížová	New York Sirens	One year	
October 13, 2026	Maja Nylén Persson	New York Sirens	One year	
October 20, 2026	Sara Hjalmarsson	Toronto Sceptres	Two years	
November 19, 2026	Clara Van Wieren	Toronto Sceptres	One year	

=== Trades ===
Date	Details		Ref.
June 16, 2026	To Detroit Clutch Hilary Knight	To Vegas Vanguards First round pick – 2026 PWHL Draft (#3 – Tessa Janecke)	
June 16, 2026	To Boston Fleet Ella Huber; Third round pick – 2026 PWHL Draft (#27 – Leah Stecker)	To Detroit Clutch Second round pick – 2026 PWHL Draft (#22 – Casey Borgiel); Third round pick – 2026 PWHL Draft (#34 – MK O'Brien)	
June 17, 2026	To Vegas Vanguards Second round pick – 2026 PWHL Draft (#13 – Issy Wunder); Fifth round pick – 2026 PWHL Draft (#49 – Kendall Butze)	To Vancouver Goldeneyes Abby Boreen; Second round pick – 2026 PWHL Draft (#17 – Thea Johansson)	
June 19, 2026	To Ottawa Charge Jenna Buglioni	To Seattle Torrent Neena Brick	

=== Retirements ===
Player retirements
Date	Player	Team(s)	Ref
May 13, 2026	Hannah Brandt	Boston Fleet (2023–26)	
May 28, 2026	Savannah Harmon	Ottawa Charge (2023–24), Toronto Sceptres (2024–26)	
October 1, 2026	Claire Thompson	Minnesota Frost (2024–25), Vancouver Goldeneyes (2025–26)	

== Broadcast rights ==
=== Canada ===
The league will continue its broadcasting agreement with CBC Sports, with 26 games airing on CBC Television throughout the season. On September 29, 2026, it was announced that CBC would air a package of eight primetime games on Saturday nights throughout the season under the long-running Hockey Night in Canada banner, which each game featuring at least one Canadian team. Ahead of its 2026–27 season, Rogers Communications ended the sub-licensing agreement it had maintained with the CBC to supply Sportsnet-produced National Hockey League games to the network under the HNIC brand, ending the NHL's 74-year association with the CBC.

=== United States ===
On September 9, 2026, the PWHL announced its first full-season national linear TV deal in the United States with Scripps Sports, with Scripps-owned Ion Television carrying a weekly telecast on Saturday nights, one playoff series, and the Walter Cup Finals. Additionally, the FAST service Scripps Sports Network will broadcast two games per week, and Detroit and Las Vegas games will air locally on Scripps-owned WMYD and KMCC respectively.
