= 2026–27 Boston Fleet season =

Professional Women's Hockey League season

2026–27 Boston Fleet
- League: TBD PWHL
- Conference: TBD East
- 2026–27 record: 0–0–0–0
- Home record: 0–0–0–0
- Road record: 0–0–0–0
- Goals for: 0
- Goals against: 0

Team information
- General manager: Danielle Marmer
- Coach: François Méthot
- Captain: Megan Keller
- Alternate captains: TBD
- Arena: Agganis Arena

Team leaders
- Goals: TBD

The 2026–27 Boston Fleet season will be the team's fourth season as a member of the Professional Women's Hockey League (PWHL). They play their home games at the Agganis Arena in Boston, Massachusetts.

== Standings ==
=== Overall Standings ===
Pos	Team	Pld	W	OTW	OTL	L	GF	GA	GD	Pts
1	Boston Fleet	0	0	0	0	0	0	0	0	0
2	Minnesota Frost	0	0	0	0	0	0	0	0	0
3	Montréal Victoire	0	0	0	0	0	0	0	0	0
4	New York Sirens	0	0	0	0	0	0	0	0	0
5	Ottawa Charge	0	0	0	0	0	0	0	0	0

Updated to match(es) played on December 5, 2026. Source: PWHL

=== Conference Standings ===
Pos	Team	Pld	W	OTW	OTL	L	GF	GA	GD	Pts
1	Boston Fleet	0	0	0	0	0	0	0	0	0
2	Montreal Victoire	0	0	0	0	0	0	0	0	0
3	New York Sirens	0	0	0	0	0	0	0	0	0
4	Ottawa Charge	0	0	0	0	0	0	0	0	0
5	Toronto Sceptres	0	0	0	0	0	0	0	0	0
6	Hamilton Havoc	0	0	0	0	0	0	0	0	0

Updated to match(es) played on December 5, 2026. Source: PWHL

== Preseason ==
The PWHL preseason schedule was announced on September 10, 2026. The Fleet will play the New York Sirens and the Montreal Victoire in Wellesley, Massachusetts at the Boston Sports Institute.

Game log
Pre-season camp

Date	Opponent	Score	OT	Decision	Location	Recap
November 23	@ New York	–			Boston Sports Institute	
November 25	Montreal	–			Boston Sports Institute	

|-

== Transactions ==
=== Draft signings ===
The 2026 PWHL Draft was held on June 17, 2026.

Drafted prospect signings
Date	Player	Team	Draft	Term	Ref.
August 3, 2026	Leah Stecker	Boston Fleet	Third round, 27th overall (2026)	Three years	
September 30, 2026	Grace Dwyer	Boston Fleet	First round, 10th overall (2026)	Three years	

=== Free agent signings ===
The free agency period began on June 2, 2026.

Free agent signings
Date	Player	New team	Previous team	Term	Ref.
June 20, 2026	Amanda Boulier	Boston Fleet	Montreal Victoire	Two years	
June 20, 2026	Taylor House	Boston Fleet	Ottawa Charge	One year	

=== Contract extensions ===
Player contract extensions
Date	Player	Team	Term	Ref.
June 10, 2026	Susanna Tapani	Boston Fleet	Two years	
June 18, 2026	Sophie Shirley	Boston Fleet	Two years	
June 18, 2026	Jill Saulnier	Boston Fleet	Two years	
June 19, 2026	Olivia Mobley	Boston Fleet	One year	
June 19, 2026	Amanda Thiele	Boston Fleet	One year	
June 20, 2026	Loren Gabel	Boston Fleet	One year	
June 20, 2026	Laura Kluge	Boston Fleet	Two years	
June 20, 2026	Rylind MacKinnon	Boston Fleet	One year	
July 14, 2026	Haley Winn	Boston Fleet	Three years	
July 15, 2026	Abby Newhook	Boston Fleet	Two years	

=== Trades ===
Date	Details		Ref.
June 16, 2026	To Boston Fleet Ella Huber; Third round pick – 2026 PWHL Draft (#27 – Leah Stecker)	To PWHL Detroit Second round pick – 2026 PWHL Draft (#22 – Casey Borgiel); Third round pick – 2026 PWHL Draft (#34 – MK O'Brien)	

=== Retirements ===
Player retirements
Date	Player	Team(s)	Ref
May 13, 2026	Hannah Brandt	Boston Fleet (2023–26)	
