= 2026–27 Vancouver Goldeneyes season =

Professional Women's Hockey League season

2026–27 Vancouver Goldeneyes
- League: TBD PWHL
- Conference: TBD West
- 2026–27 record: 0–0–0–0
- Home record: 0–0–0–0
- Road record: 0–0–0–0
- Goals for: 0
- Goals against: 0

Team information
- General manager: Alison Izzi
- Coach: Cara Gardner Morey
- Captain: Ashton Bell
- Alternate captains: Kelly Pannek; Lee Stecklein
- Arena: Pacific Coliseum

Team leaders
- Goals: TBD

The 2026–27 Vancouver Goldeneyes season will be the team's second season as a member of the Professional Women's Hockey League (PWHL). They play their home games at the Pacific Coliseum in Vancouver, British Columbia.

== Standings ==
=== Overall Standings ===
Pos	Team	Pld	W	OTW	OTL	L	GF	GA	GD	Pts
6	Toronto Sceptres	0	0	0	0	0	0	0	0	0
7	Seattle Torrent	0	0	0	0	0	0	0	0	0
8	Vancouver Goldeneyes	0	0	0	0	0	0	0	0	0
9	Detroit Clutch	0	0	0	0	0	0	0	0	0
10	Hamilton Havoc	0	0	0	0	0	0	0	0	0

Updated to match(es) played on December 5, 2026. Source: PWHL

=== Conference Standings ===
Pos	Team	Pld	W	OTW	OTL	L	GF	GA	GD	Pts
1	Minnesota Frost	0	0	0	0	0	0	0	0	0
2	Seattle Torrent	0	0	0	0	0	0	0	0	0
3	Vancouver Goldeneyes	0	0	0	0	0	0	0	0	0
4	Detroit Clutch	0	0	0	0	0	0	0	0	0
5	Vegas Vanguards	0	0	0	0	0	0	0	0	0
6	San Jose Sea Lions	0	0	0	0	0	0	0	0	0

Updated to match(es) played on December 5, 2026. Source: PWHL

== Preseason ==
The PWHL preseason schedule was announced on September 10, 2026. The Goldeneyes will play PWHL Las Vegas and the Minnesota Frost in Las Vegas, Nevada at the America First Center.

Game log
Pre-season camp

Date	Opponent	Score	OT	Decision	Location	Box score/recap
November 23	@ Minnesota	–			America First Center	
November 24	Las Vegas	–			America First Center	

== Transactions ==
=== Draft pick signings ===
The 2026 PWHL Draft was held on June 17, 2026.

Drafted prospect signings
Date	Player	Draft	Term	Ref.
September 1, 2026	Katie DeSa	Fourth round, 37th overall (2026)	One year	
September 29, 2026	Caroline Harvey	First round, 1st overall (2026)	Three years	

=== Free agent signings ===
The free agency period began on June 2, 2026.

Free agent signings
Date	Player	Previous team	Term	Ref.
June 21, 2026	Dominika Lásková	Montreal Victoire	One year	
July 14, 2026	Laura Fuoco	EV Zug Women (SWHL-A)	One year	

=== Contract extensions ===
Player contract extensions
Date	Player	Term	Ref.
June 2, 2026	Sarah Nurse	Two years	
June 10, 2026	Jenn Gardiner	Three years	
June 10, 2026	Izzy Daniel	Two years	
June 19, 2026	Mannon McMahon	Two years	
June 19, 2026	Gabby Rosenthal	One year	
June 21, 2026	Katie Chan	Two years	
September 8, 2026	Maddy Samoskevich	One year	

=== Trades ===
Date	Details		Ref.
June 17, 2026	To PWHL Las Vegas Second round pick – 2026 PWHL Draft (#13 – Issy Wunder); Fifth round pick – 2026 PWHL Draft (#49 – Kendall Butze)	To Vancouver Goldeneyes Abby Boreen; Second round pick – 2026 PWHL Draft (#17 – Thea Johansson)	

=== Retirements ===
Player retirements
Date	Player	Team(s)	Ref
October 1, 2026	Claire Thompson	Minnesota Frost (2024–25), Vancouver Goldeneyes (2025–26)	
