= Eastern Conference (PWHL) =

One of two conferences in the Professional Women's Hockey League

- League: Professional Women's Hockey League
- Sport: Ice hockey
- Founded: 2026
- No. of teams: 6

The Eastern Conference (French: Conférence de l'Est) is one of two conferences in the North American Professional Women's Hockey League (PWHL) used to divide teams. It and its counterpart, the Western Conference, each are composed of six teams. Conferences are not organized into divisions.

== History ==
The Eastern Conference was created for the 2026–27 season when the PWHL added four new teams to the league bringing the total to 12. Teams will play 18 matches against conference opponents.

== Teams ==
Team	Location	Arena	Joined
Boston Fleet	Boston, Massachusetts	Agganis Arena	2023
Hamilton Havoc	Hamilton, Ontario	TD Coliseum	2026
Montreal Victoire	Laval, Quebec	Place Bell	2023
New York Sirens	Newark, New Jersey	Prudential Center	2023
Ottawa Charge	Ottawa, Ontario	Canadian Tire Centre	2023
Toronto Sceptres	Toronto, Ontario	Coca-Cola Coliseum	2023

== Playoffs ==
At the end of the regular season, the top four teams from each conference advance to the playoffs. PWHL rules allow the top team in each conference to choose their opponent for their first match between the third and fourth seed.
