= Western Conference (PWHL) =

One of two conferences in the Professional Women's Hockey League

- League: Professional Women's Hockey League
- Sport: Ice hockey
- Founded: 2026
- No. of teams: 6

The Western Conference (French: Conférence de l'Ouest) is one of two conferences in the North American Professional Women's Hockey League (PWHL) used to divide teams. It and its counterpart, the Eastern Conference, each are composed of six teams. Conferences are not organized into divisions.

== History ==
The Western Conference was created for the 2026-27 season when the PWHL added four new teams to the league bringing the total to 12. Teams will play 18 matches against conference opponents.

== Teams ==
Team	Location	Arena	Joined
Detroit Clutch	Detroit, Michigan	Little Caesars Arena	2026
Minnesota Frost	Saint Paul, Minnesota	Grand Casino Arena	2023
San Jose Sea Lions	San Jose, California	SAP Center	2026
Seattle Torrent	Seattle, Washington	Climate Pledge Arena	2025
Vancouver Goldeneyes	Vancouver, British Columbia	Pacific Coliseum	2025
Vegas Vanguards	Paradise, Nevada	T-Mobile Arena	2026

== Playoffs ==
At the end of the regular season, the top four teams from each conference advance to the playoffs. PWHL rules allow the top team in each conference to choose their opponent for their first match between the third and fourth seed.
