= Lara Beecher =

American ice hockey player (born 2004)

- Born: November 10, 2004 (age 21) Buffalo, New York, U.S.
- Height: 5 ft 5 in (165 cm)
- Position: Forward
- Shoots: Right
- PWHL team: Minnesota Frost
- Playing career: 2022–present

Lara Beecher (born November 10, 2004) is an American professional ice hockey forward for the Minnesota Frost of the Professional Women's Hockey League (PWHL). She played college ice hockey at Vermont and Clarkson.

== Playing career ==
=== College ===
Beecher began her college ice hockey career for Vermont during the 2022–23 season. In her freshman year, she recorded eight goals and 11 assists in 38 games. She tied for the lead among all Hockey East rookies with 18 points in league play. Her 44 shots were the eighth most by a rookie player. Following the season she was named to the Hockey East All-Rookie Team and the Hockey East Rookie of the Year. During the 2023–24 season, in her sophomore year, she recorded nine goals and ten assists in 35 games. During the 2024–25 season, in her junior year, she recorded six goals and 11 assists in 36 games.

Following her junior year, she transferred to Clarkson. During the 2025–26 season, in her senior year, she recorded a career-high 12 goals and 13 assists in 35 games.

=== Professional ===
On June 17, 2026, Beecher was drafted in the sixth round, 69th overall, by the Minnesota Frost in the 2026 PWHL Draft.

== Personal life ==
Beecher was born to Holly and Mike Beecher, and has a brother, Michael, and sister, Katie.

== Career statistics ==
			Regular season					Playoffs
Season	Team	League	GP	G	A	Pts	PIM	GP	G	A	Pts	PIM
2022–23	University of Vermont	Hockey East	38	8	11	19	10	—	—	—	—	—
2023–24	University of Vermont	Hockey East	35	9	10	19	16	—	—	—	—	—
2024–25	University of Vermont	Hockey East	36	6	11	17	23	—	—	—	—	—
2025–26	Clarkson University	ECAC	35	12	13	25	14	—	—	—	—	—
NCAA totals			142	35	45	80	63	—	—	—	—	—
