= Tova Henderson =

Canadian ice hockey player (born 2004)

- Born: January 13, 2004 (age 22) Richmond, British Columbia, Canada
- Height: 5 ft 8 in (173 cm)
- Position: Defence
- Shoots: Left
- PWHL team: Minnesota Frost
- Playing career: 2022–present

Tova Henderson (born January 13, 2004) is a Canadian professional ice hockey defenceman for the Minnesota Frost of the Professional Women's Hockey League (PWHL). She played college ice hockey at Minnesota Duluth.

== Playing career ==
=== College ===
Henderson began her college ice hockey career for Minnesota Duluth during the 2022–23 season. During her freshman year she recorded one goal and six assists in 38 games. During the 2023–24 season, in her sophomore year, she recorded one goal and seven assists in 39 games. During the 2024–25 season, in her junior year, she recorded a career-high six goals and 14 assists in 39 games. Following the season she was named to the All-WCHA Second Team.

On May 19, 2025, she was named an alternate captain for the 2025–26 season. During her senior year, she recorded three goals and ten assists in 38 games. She finished her career with the seventh-most consecutive games played in program history with 153 games.

=== Professional ===
On June 17, 2026, Henderson was drafted in the fourth round, 45th overall, by the Minnesota Frost in the 2026 PWHL Draft.

== Career statistics ==
			Regular season					Playoffs
Season	Team	League	GP	G	A	Pts	PIM	GP	G	A	Pts	PIM
2022–23	University of Minnesota Duluth	WCHA	38	1	6	7	4	—	—	—	—	—
2023–24	University of Minnesota Duluth	WCHA	39	1	7	8	6	—	—	—	—	—
2024–25	University of Minnesota Duluth	WCHA	39	6	14	20	18	—	—	—	—	—
2025–26	University of Minnesota Duluth	WCHA	38	3	10	13	6	—	—	—	—	—
NCAA totals			154	11	37	48	34	—	—	—	—	—
