= Elyssa Biederman =

American ice hockey player (born 2004)

- Born: July 14, 2004 (age 22) Franklin, Michigan, U.S.
- Height: 5 ft 1 in (155 cm)
- Position: Forward
- Shoots: Right
- PWHL team: Hamilton Havoc
- Playing career: 2022–present

Elyssa Biederman (born July 14, 2004) is an American professional ice hockey forward for the Hamilton Havoc of the Professional Women's Hockey League (PWHL). She played college ice hockey at Colgate.

== Playing career ==
=== College ===
Biederman began her college ice hockey career for Colgate during the 2022–23 season. In her freshman year, she recorded 17 goals and 21 assists in 40 games, setting a new program record for points by a freshman with 38. During the 2023–24 season, in her sophomore year, she recorded 17 goals and 33 assists in 40 games. During the 2024–25 season, in her junior year, she recorded 19 goals and 32 assists in 39 games. Following the season she was named to the All-ECAC Second Team. During the 2025–26 season, in her senior year, she recorded 19 goals and 25 assists in 39 games. Following the season she was named to the All-ECAC Third Team.

She finished her collegiate career ranked in the top-five of several Colgate program records, including third in career points (183), third in career assists (111) and fifth in career goals (72).

=== Professional ===
On June 17, 2026, Biederman was drafted in the third round, 30th overall, by the Hamilton Havoc in the 2026 PWHL Draft.

== Personal life ==
Biederman is Jewish. According to her USA Hockey profile, Biederman's favorite postgame meal is steak with green beans and potatoes.

== Career statistics ==
=== College ===
			Regular season					Playoffs
Season	Team	League	GP	G	A	Pts	PIM	GP	G	A	Pts	PIM
2022–23	Colgate University	ECAC	40	17	21	38	24	—	—	—	—	—
2023–24	Colgate University	ECAC	40	17	33	50	20	—	—	—	—	—
2024–25	Colgate University	ECAC	39	19	32	51	25	—	—	—	—	—
2025–26	Colgate University	ECAC	36	19	25	44	16	—	—	—	—	—
NCAA totals			155	72	111	183	85	—	—	—	—	—
