= Reichen Kirchmair =

- Born: January 16, 2004 (age 22) Oakville, Ontario, Canada
- Height: 5 ft 8 in (173 cm)
- Position: Forward
- Shoots: Left
- PWHL team: San Jose Sea Lions
- Playing career: 2026–present

Reichen Kirchmair (born January 16, 2004) is a Canadian professional ice hockey forward for the San Jose Sea Lions of the Professional Women's Hockey League (PWHL). She played college ice hockey at Providence.

== Playing career ==
=== College ===
During the 2025-26 season, Kirchmair appeared in 35 games, serving as the Providence team captain. Her 25 points led the team in scoring. In the final regular season game, Kirchmair scored a goal, representing her 100th career point. She became the 29th player in program history to achieve the feat.

=== Professional ===
On June 17, 2026, Kirchmair was drafted in the sixth round, 64th overall, by the San Jose Sea Lions in the 2026 PWHL Draft.

== International play ==
Medal record

Representing Canada

Ice hockey

World U18 Championships
Gold medal – first place	2023 Sweden	

Kirchmair won a gold medal with the Canada women's national under-18 ice hockey team at the 2023 IIHF World Women's U18 Championship in Sweden.

== Awards and honours ==
- 2023 Hockey East All-Rookie Team
- 2025 Hockey East Player of the Year
- 2025 Hockey East Scoring Champion
