= Mya Vaslet =

- Born: April 6, 2003 (age 23) Stittsville, Ontario, Canada
- Height: 5 ft 10 in (178 cm)
- Position: Forward
- Shoots: Left
- PWHL team Former teams: Hamilton Havoc; Penn State Nittany Lions
- Playing career: 2025–present

Mya Vaslet (born April 6, 2003) is a Canadian professional ice hockey player who is a forward for the Hamilton Havoc of the Professional Women's Hockey League (PWHL). She played college ice hockey for the Penn State Nittany Lions.

== Early life ==
Vaslet was born in Stittsville, Ontario. She started playing hockey at 7-years-old and played for numerous teams, including Team Ontario Blue for 2019 National Women's U18 Championship. She played for the Nepean Wildcats in the Ontario Women's Hockey League and finished her Juniors career with the Etobicoke Junior Dolphins. She also attended the U18 and U22 Selection Camp for Team Canada.

== Playing career ==
=== College ===
Vaslet began her college ice hockey career for Penn State for the 2021–2022 season. She was the youngest female in Canada at the time to commit to an NCAA Division 1 University. During her college career, she recorded 30 goals and 30 assists in 149 games. She holds the statistics of the most first goals in an AHA championship as well as scoring first in every AHA championship she played in.

=== Professional ===
On June 17, 2026, Vaslet was drafted in the sixth round, 66th overall, by the Hamilton Havoc in the 2026 PWHL Draft.

== Career statistics ==
Note: GP = Games played; G = Goals; A = Assists; Pts = Points; PIM = Penalty minutes;

| | | | Regular season | | | | | Playoffs |
| Season | Team | League | GP | G | A | Pts | PIM | GP | G | A | Pts | PIM |
|---|---|---|---|---|---|---|---|---|---|---|---|---|
| 2021–22 | Penn State Nittany Lions | AHA | 33 | 5 | 2 | 7 | 14 | — | — | — | — | — |
| 2022–23 | Penn State Nittany Lions | AHA | 38 | 3 | 9 | 12 | 10 | — | — | — | — | — |
| 2023–24 | Penn State Nittany Lions | AHA | 38 | 16 | 10 | 26 | 25 | — | — | — | — | — |
| 2024–25 | Penn State Nittany Lions | AHA | 4 | 1 | 0 | 1 | 2 | — | — | — | — | — |
| 2025–26 | Penn State Nittany Lions | AHA | 36 | 5 | 9 | 14 | 22 | — | — | — | — | — |
| AHA totals | | | 149 | 30 | 30 | 60 | 73 | — | — | — | — | — |
