= Megan Woodworth =

American ice hockey player (born 2003)

- Born: July 22, 2003 (age 23) Berwick, Nova Scotia, Canada
- Height: 5 ft 4 in (163 cm)
- Position: Forward
- Shoots: Left
- PWHL team: Hamilton Havoc
- Playing career: 2022–present

Megan Woodworth (born July 22, 2003) is a Canadian professional ice hockey forward for the Hamilton Havoc of the Professional Women's Hockey League (PWHL). She played college ice hockey at Connecticut.

== Early life ==
Woodworth attended Kent School in Kent, Connecticut, where she was a three sport athlete, playing soccer, lacrosse and ice hockey.

== Playing career ==
=== College ===
Woodworth began her college ice hockey career for Connecticut during the 2022–23 season. During her freshman year, she recorded three goals and six assists in 35 games. During the 2023–24 season, in her sophomore year, she recorded seven goals and seven assists in 38 games. During the 2024–25 season, in her junior year, she recorded five goals and ten assists in 32 games. During the Hockey East Tournament championship game against Northeastern, she scored the game-winning goal with 35 seconds left in overtime to help the Huskies win the Hockey East tournament for the first time in program history. With the win, they qualified for the NCAA women's ice hockey tournament for the first time in program history. During the 2025–26 season, in her senior year, she recorded a career-high 16 goals and 11 assists in 39 games. She led all team forwards with 41 blocked shots.

=== Professional ===
On June 17, 2026, Woodworth was drafted in the fourth round, 42nd overall, by the Hamilton Havoc in the 2026 PWHL Draft.

== Personal life ==
Woodworth was born to Jane and Robert Woodworth. She has three brothers, John, Cale and Kyle, and a sister, Sadie.

== Career statistics ==
			Regular season					Playoffs
Season	Team	League	GP	G	A	Pts	PIM	GP	G	A	Pts	PIM
2022–23	University of Connecticut	Hockey East	35	3	6	9	8	—	—	—	—	—
2023–24	University of Connecticut	Hockey East	38	7	7	14	6	—	—	—	—	—
2024–25	University of Connecticut	Hockey East	32	5	10	15	17	—	—	—	—	—
2025–26	University of Connecticut	Hockey East	39	16	11	27	14	—	—	—	—	—
NCAA totals			144	31	34	65	45	—	—	—	—	—
