= Melissa Caruso =

American ice hockey executive

- Education: Sports management, Springfield College, 2009
- Occupation: General manager
- Employer: Minnesota Frost

Melissa Caruso is the general manager of the Minnesota Frost, a member of the Professional Women's Hockey League (PWHL). Caruso was named to this position in September 2024, a few months after the team won the inaugural Walter Cup championship.

== Career ==
Caruso previously worked at the American Hockey League (AHL) for 15 years, most recently as the Vice President of Hockey Operations and Governance. In that role, Caruso was responsible for scheduling games for the 31 teams in the league, among other responsibilities.

== Education ==
Caruso holds a degree in Sports Management from Springfield College in Massachusetts. She is a Massachusetts native and now lives in St. Paul, Minnesota.
