= Grace Dwyer =

- Height: 5 ft 8 in (173 cm)
- Position: Defense
- Shoots: Left
- PWHL team: Boston Fleet
- Playing career: 2026–present

Grace Dwyer is a professional ice hockey defenseman for the Boston Fleet of the Professional Women's Hockey League (PWHL). She played college ice hockey at Cornell.

== Playing career ==
=== College ===
In her final season at Cornell, Dwyer served as team captain, appearing in 33 games.

=== Professional ===
On June 17, 2026, Dwyer was drafted tenth overall by the Boston Fleet in the 2026 PWHL Draft.

== Awards and honors ==
- 2026 First Team All Ivy
- 2026 ECAC Hockey Third Team All-Star
