= Leah Stecker =

American ice hockey player (born 2003)

- Born: November 13, 2003 (age 22) Randolph, New Jersey, U.S.
- Height: 5 ft 10 in (178 cm)
- Position: Defense
- Shoots: Right
- PWHL team: Boston Fleet
- Playing career: 2022–present

Leah Stecker (born November 13, 2003) is an American professional ice hockey defenceman for the Boston Fleet of the Professional Women's Hockey League (PWHL). She played college ice hockey at Penn State.

== Early life ==
Stecker is the daughter of Steven and Karen Stecker, and has two older sisters, Jill and Alison. She attended Morristown Beard School where she played ice hockey. She was named a First Team All-State honoree four times. She was named the New Jersey Girls Ice Hockey Player of the Year and the New Jersey Devils Player of the Year for the 2019–20 season. She led Morristown Beard to state championships in 2020 and 2022.

== Playing career ==
=== College ===
Stecker began her college ice hockey career for Penn State during the 2022–23 season. During her freshman year she recorded one goal and seven assists in 36 games. During the 2023–24 season, in her sophomore year, she recorded four goals and seven assists in 36 games. During the 2024–25 season, in her junior year, she recorded four goals and 14 assists in 38 games. During the 2025–26 season, in her senior year, she recorded three goals and 17 assists in 39 games.

=== Professional ===
On June 17, 2026, Stecker was drafted in the third round, 27th overall, by the Boston Fleet in the 2026 PWHL Draft. She became the second New Jersey-born player to be drafted to the PWHL.

== Career statistics ==
			Regular season					Playoffs
Season	Team	League	GP	G	A	Pts	PIM	GP	G	A	Pts	PIM
2022–23	Penn State University	CHA	36	1	7	8	6	—	—	—	—	—
2023–24	Penn State University	CHA	38	4	7	11	29	—	—	—	—	—
2024–25	Penn State University	AHA	38	4	14	18	28	—	—	—	—	—
2025–26	Penn State University	AHA	39	3	17	20	35	—	—	—	—	—
NCAA totals			151	12	45	57	98	—	—	—	—	—
