= Lily Shannon =

American ice hockey player (born 2003)

- Born: August 21, 2003 (age 23) Andover, Massachusetts, U.S.
- Height: 5 ft 10 in (178 cm)
- Position: Forward
- Shoots: Right
- PWHL team: San Jose Sea Lions
- Playing career: 2026–present

Lily Shannon (born August 21, 2003) is an American professional ice hockey forward for the San Jose Sea Lions of the Professional Women's Hockey League (PWHL). She played college ice hockey at Northeastern.

== Playing career ==
=== College ===
Shannon began her college career with the Northeastern Huskies as a walk-on, with her coaches planning to redshirt her for her freshman season. However, her play during the initial practices changed the mind of coaches who subsequently brought her into the full roster. She would end the season as an All-Rookie selection in the Hockey East conference. Ahead of her senior season in 2025–26, Shannon was named as the Huskies' team captain, the first born in Massachusetts since 2016–17. As a senior, she posted career highs in goals (19), assists (24) and points (43). In addition, she led the Huskies with six game-winning goals.

=== Professional ===
On June 17, 2026, Shannon was selected in the fourth round, 40th overall, by the San Jose Sea Lions in the 2026 PWHL Draft.

== Personal life ==
Shannon was born with moderate hearing loss and wears hearing aids in her everyday life as well as while playing hockey. She began playing hockey at age seven after watching her older brother Jack playing the sport.

== Awards and honors ==
- Beanpot Championship (2025)
- Hockey East All-Rookie Team (2022-23)
- Hockey East First Team All-Star (2025-26)
- New England All-Star (2025-26)
- AHCA Krampade All-America Scholar (2023-24, 2024-25)
