= Casey Borgiel =

American ice hockey player (born 2004)

- Born: June 14, 2004 (age 22) Port Huron, Michigan, U.S.
- Height: 5 ft 7 in (170 cm)
- Position: Defense
- Shoots: Left
- PWHL team: Detroit Clutch
- Playing career: 2026–present

Casey Borgiel (born June 14, 2004) is an American professional ice hockey player who is a defender for the Detroit Clutch of the Professional Women's Hockey League (PWHL). She played college ice hockey for Holy Cross and Colgate.

== Playing career ==
=== College ===
Borgiel began her college ice hockey career for Holy Cross during the 2022–23 season. During her freshman year she recorded two goals and five assists in 34 games. During the 2023–24 season, in her sophomore year, she recorded two goals and nine assists in 34 games.

On August 14, 2024, she transferred to Colgate. During the 2024–25 season, in her junior year, she recorded three goals and 26 assists in 39 games. During the 2025–26 season, in her senior year, she recorded four goals and 17 assists in 36 games.

=== Professional ===
On June 17, 2026, Borgiel was drafted in the second round, 22nd overall, by the Detroit Clutch in the 2026 PWHL Draft.
