= McKenna Van Gelder =

Canadian ice hockey player

- Born: January 24, 2004 (age 22) Etobicoke, Ontario
- Height: 5 ft 7 in (170 cm)
- Position: Center
- PWHL team: San Jose Sea Lions
- Played for: Cornell

McKenna Van Gelder (born January 24, 2004) is a Canadian ice hockey player. She played center for the Cornell Big Red women's ice hockey team in the NCAA, was a member of the gold-winning Team Canada at the 2022 World U18 Championships, and was drafted by the San Jose Sea Lions in the 2026 PWHL Draft.

== Playing career ==
Starting at the age of 8, Van Gelder played for the Etobicoke Junior Dolphins, winning a U13 AA OWHA championship in 2017 and an OWHA U22 Elite provincial title in 2022, in which she was the team's captain and leading scorer. She also competed on the boy's hockey team at her high school, Silverthorn Collegiate Institute and won a city silver medal with them in 2020.

Van Gelder played for Team Canada at the 2022 IIHF Women's World Championship, winning gold and placing as the 9th overall scorer of the tournament, scoring 6 goals in 6 games.

She attended Cornell University and played as a center for the Big Red women's ice hockey team. As a senior, she was a co-captain of the team, finished fifth on the team with 23 points and ranked third on the team in goals scored. On December 2, 2025, she was named ECAC Hockey Forward of the Week. As a junior, she also led the team in blocked shots. She was named ECAC Rookie of the Week for the week of November 1, 2022. At Cornell, Van Gelder won two Ivy League championships, an ECAC Hockey tournament championship, and an NCAA regional championship, and advanced to the 2025 Frozen Four.

In the 2026 PWHL Draft, she was drafted in the fifth round, 52nd overall, by the San Jose Sea Lions.
