= San Jose Sea Lions =

PWHL ice hockey team in San Jose, California

- City: San Jose, California
- League: PWHL
- Conference: Western
- Founded: 2026
- Home arena: SAP Center
- Colors: Sunset Orange, Coastal Blue, Sea Mist, and Tidal Navy
- Owner: Mark Walter Group
- General manager: Troy Ryan
- Head coach: Troy Ryan
- Captain: TBA
- Website: www.thepwhl.com/en/teams/san-jose

Championships
- Regular season titles: 0
- Walter Cups: 0

The San Jose Sea Lions are an upcoming professional ice hockey team based in San Jose, California, that will compete in the Professional Women's Hockey League (PWHL). They are the league's sixth announced expansion franchise, concluding the league's second round of expansions alongside the Detroit Clutch, the Hamilton Havoc, and the Vegas Vanguards for the 2026–27 season. The Sea Lions will play home games at SAP Center.

== History ==
=== Founding ===
Multiple factors led the PWHL to place an expansion team in San Jose despite the city not having hosted a PWHL Takeover Tour game, making them the second PWHL expansion city along with Las Vegas to not have previously hosted one. One such factor was the success of the National Hockey League's San Jose Sharks. The San Francisco Bay Area also has a particularly strong support of women's sports in general; the Women's National Basketball Association's Golden State Valkyries and the National Women's Soccer League's Bay FC set attendance records since beginning play in the two years preceding the Sea Lions' founding, and the Women's Pro Baseball League had also recently expanded into the area with the San Francisco Firebells. California in general has a strong support of women's hockey, ranking sixth in the United States in women's hockey participation behind five colder-climate states. With their founding, the Sea Lions became the first professional women's hockey team in the state.

The team's founding and entry into the league was announced on May 19, 2026. They will begin playing in the PWHL during the 2026–27 season. The team is the league's twelfth franchise overall and its sixth expansion team, part of the second round of expansion. The team will play its games at SAP Center, which is also the Sharks' home arena.

On May 22, 2026, PWHL San Jose announced former Toronto Sceptres and current Canada women's national ice hockey team head coach Troy Ryan as the team's inaugural head coach and general manager, making him the first person to hold both roles simultaneously for a PWHL team.

=== Inaugural season ===
The Sea Lions are scheduled to begin their inaugural season with a home opener against the Minnesota Frost on December 5, 2026.

== Team identity ==
As part of the expansion announcement, the team's colors were revealed to be orange, blue and white. The color scheme is inspired by the San Jose city flag and represents the Bay Area's optimistic energy. The individual colors hold additional significance: orange is an homage to the Sharks' secondary color and the area's orange groves, and blue is a nod to the Pacific Ocean coastline and sky above. Current San Jose mayor Matt Mahan pitched the name "Hammerheads" in honor of former San Jose mayor Susan Hammer, who helped bring the Sharks to San Jose during her tenure. PWHL Senior Vice President of Business Operations Amy Scheer confirmed in an interview that Hammerheads was on the short list of names.

On November 10, 2026, the team's name was announced as the San Jose Sea Lions, with the logo revealed at the same time. The league describes sea lions as guardians of the rugged Bay Area coastline, known for their intelligence, agility and fierce protection of their colonies. The name also honors the San Francisco Sea Lions of the West Coast Negro Baseball Association, who featured Toni Stone, the first woman to play baseball regularly in a major men's professional league.

== Players and personnel ==
=== Current roster ===
As of November 10, 2026

No.	Nat	Player	Pos	S/G	Age	Acquired	Birthplace
17	(United States)	Brooke Bryant	F	R	26	2026	Linden, California
88	(Canada)	Tia Chan	G	R	24	2026	Hamilton, Ontario
24	(Canada)	Anne Cherkowski	F	R	24	2026	Coldstream, British Columbia
22	(Canada)	Maggie Connors	F	L	26	2026	St John's, Newfoundland
19	(Italy)	Kristin Della Rovere	F	R	25	2026	Caledon, Ontario
10	(United States)	Laila Edwards	D	R	22	2026	Cleveland Heights, Ohio
5	(United States)	Rory Guilday	D	L	24	2026	Chanhassen, Minnesota
78	(United States)	Hadley Hartmetz	D	R	25	2026	Phoenixville, Pennsylvania
2	(United States)	Mariah Keopple	D	L	26	2026	Menomonie, Wisconsin
91	(Canada)	Reichen Kirchmair	F	L	22	2026	Oakville, Ontario
39	(United States)	Abbey Levy	G	L	26	2026	Congers, New York
20	(United States)	Sloane Matthews	F	R	22	2026	Wayzata, Minnesota
96	(Czech Republic)	Natálie Mlýnková	F	L	25	2026	Zlin, Czech Republic
43	(Canada)	Kristin O'Neill	F	L	28	2026	Oakville, Ontario
55	(Czech Republic)	Daniela Pejšová	D	L	24	2026	Teplice, Czech Republic
30	(Canada)	Corinne Schroeder	G	L	27	2026	Elm Creek, Manitoba
12	(United States)	Lily Shannon	F	R	23	2026	Andover, Massachusetts
76	(Canada)	McKenna Van Gelder	F	R	22	2026	Etobicoke, Ontario
28	(Canada)	Maddi Wheeler	F	L	24	2026	Erinsville, Ontario

=== First-round draft picks ===
- 2026: Laila Edwards (4th overall)
