= 2026 PWHL Draft =

4th PWHL Draft

General information
- Date: June 17, 2026
- Location: Fox Theatre; Detroit, Michigan

Overview
- 72 total selections in 6 rounds
- League: Professional Women's Hockey League
- First selection: (United States) Caroline Harvey (Vancouver Goldeneyes)

The 2026 PWHL Draft was the fourth annual draft in the Professional Women's Hockey League, and took place on June 17, 2026, at the Fox Theatre in Detroit, Michigan.

Caroline Harvey was selected first overall by the Vancouver Goldeneyes.

== Eligibility ==
The declaration period for the draft opened on March 1, 2026, and closed on May 8. Undrafted players will become free agents; players must declare for the draft to reach free agency. Selected players may re-enter the draft if they are not signed to their draft club after two years. No player may declare for more than two drafts.

== Top prospects ==
=== Top skaters ===
Source: The Hockey News (April 25, 2026) ranking.

Ranking	Player	School/club team
1	(United States) Caroline Harvey (D)	Wisconsin (NCAA)
2	(United States) Abbey Murphy (RW)	Minnesota (NCAA)
3	(United States) Laila Edwards (D/RW)	Wisconsin (NCAA)
4	(United States) Tessa Janecke (C)	Penn State (NCAA)
5	(Finland) Nelli Laitinen (D)	Minnesota (NCAA)
6	(United States) Kirsten Simms (LW)	Wisconsin (NCAA)
7	(United States) Lacey Eden (RW)	Wisconsin (NCAA)
8	(United States) Emma Peschel (D)	Ohio State (NCAA)
9	(Canada) Issy Wunder (C)	Princeton (NCAA)
10	(United States) Sydney Morrow (D)	Minnesota (NCAA)

=== Top goaltenders ===
Source: The Hockey News (April 25, 2026) ranking.

Ranking	Player	School/club team
1	(Switzerland) Andrea Brändli	Frolunda (SDHL)
2	(China) Tia Chan	UConn (NCAA)
3	(Canada) Hailey MacLeod	Ohio State (NCAA)

== Expansion ==
The PWHL expanded by four new teams for the 2026–27 season, creating teams in Detroit, Hamilton, Las Vegas, and San Jose.

=== Protected lists and expansion player distribution process ===
The league created a six-phase expansion process for existing teams to protect some players, and for expansion teams to sign players. Phase 1, which was June 2–3, allowed existing teams to sign and protect three players. Phase 2, from June 5–8, allowed expansion teams to acquire five players from existing teams. Phase 3, June 10–12, allowed unsigned and unprotected players to negotiate with all teams. Phase 4, June 14–15, saw expansion teams build their rosters to reach 10 players. Phase 5, June 16 and 18, allowed existing teams to negotiate with and sign their own remaining players on expiring contracts. Finally, Phase 6 (after June 18) allowed all remaining eligible players on expiring contracts to sign with any team.

==== Protected players ====
Boston	Minnesota	Montreal	New York	Ottawa	Seattle	Toronto	Vancouver
Aerin Frankel	Taylor Heise	Ann-Renée Desbiens	Sarah Fillier	Rebecca Leslie	Alex Carpenter	Renata Fast	Sophie Jaques
Megan Keller	Kelly Pannek	Marie-Philip Poulin	Kristýna Kaltounková	Gwyneth Philips	Hannah Murphy	Raygan Kirk	Emerance Maschmeyer
Haley Winn	Maddie Rooney	Laura Stacey	Casey O'Brien	Ronja Savolainen	Anna Wilgren	Ella Shelton	Sarah Nurse
Shay Maloney	Sidney Morin	Maggie Flaherty	Jaime Bourbonnais	Gabbie Hughes	Julia Gosling	Kali Flanagan	Izzy Daniel
Abby Newhook	Lee Stecklein	Lina Ljungblom	Maja Nylén Persson	Fanuza Kadirova	Mikyla Grant-Mentis	Emma Gentry	Jenn Gardiner
Susanna Tapani	Grace Zumwinkle	Kati Tabin	Micah Zandee-Hart	Sarah Wozniewicz	Danielle Serdachny	Natalie Spooner	Hannah Miller

==== Signed players ====
Hamilton Havoc		Detroit Clutch		San Jose Sea Lions		Vegas Vanguards	
Player	Former team	Player	Former team	Player	Former team	Player	Former team
Brianne Jenner	Ottawa Charge	Daryl Watts	Toronto Sceptres	Corinne Schroeder	Seattle Torrent	Mae Batherson	Minnesota Frost
Kayle Osborne	New York Sirens	Cayla Barnes	Seattle Torrent	Rory Guilday	Ottawa Charge	Kendall Cooper	Minnesota Frost
Alina Müller	Boston Fleet	Hannah Bilka	Seattle Torrent	Anne Cherkowski	New York Sirens	Erin Ambrose	Montreal Victoire
Nicole Gosling	Montreal Victoire	Britta Curl-Salemme	Minnesota Frost	Kristin O’Neill	New York Sirens	Hayley Scamurra	Montreal Victoire
Emily Clark	Ottawa Charge	Jesse Compher	Toronto Sceptres	Maddi Wheeler	New York Sirens	Megan Carter	Seattle Torrent
Zoe Boyd	Boston Fleet	Sydney Bard	Vancouver Goldeneyes	Hadley Hartmetz	Boston Fleet	Nicole Hensley	Minnesota Frost
Riley Brengman	Boston Fleet	Taylor Girard	New York Sirens	Maggie Connors	Toronto Sceptres	Maureen Murphy	Montreal Victoire
Allyson Simpson	New York Sirens	Shiann Darkangelo	Montreal Victoire	Mariah Keopple	Seattle Torrent	Katy Knoll	Minnesota Frost
Abby Hustler	Minnesota Frost	Nina Jobst-Smith	Vancouver Goldeneyes	Natálie Mlýnková	Montreal Victoire		
Peyton Hemp	Ottawa Charge	Hilary Knight	Seattle Torrent (via Vegas Vanguards)	Daniela Pejšová	Boston Fleet		

== Format ==
The top selection in the draft was determined by the Gold Plan, where standings points accumulated by a team that can no longer make the playoffs count as draft order points, and the team with the most draft order points received the first overall selection.

=== Draft order ===
On June 15, 2026, the PWHL announced the draft order of selection.

Order	Team
1	Vancouver Goldeneyes
2	Seattle Torrent
3	Detroit Clutch
4	San Jose Sea Lions
5	Vegas Vanguards
6	Hamilton Havoc
7	New York Sirens
8	Toronto Sceptres
9	Minnesota Frost
10	Boston Fleet
11	Ottawa Charge
12	Montreal Victoire

== Selections by round ==
=== Round one ===
#	Player	Nationality	PWHL team	School/club team
1	Caroline Harvey (D)	United States	Vancouver Goldeneyes	Wisconsin (NCAA)
2	Abbey Murphy (F)	United States	Seattle Torrent	Minnesota (NCAA)
3	Tessa Janecke (F)	United States	Vegas Vanguards (from Detroit) (Note: Detroit → Las Vegas. Detroit's first-round pick went to Las Vegas as the result of a trade on June 15, 2026, that sent a first-round pick (3rd overall) to Las Vegas in exchange for Hilary Knight.)	Penn State (NCAA)
4	Laila Edwards (D)	United States	San Jose Sea Lions	Wisconsin (NCAA)
5	Lacey Eden (F)	United States	Vegas Vanguards	Wisconsin (NCAA)
6	Nelli Laitinen (D)	Finland	Hamilton Havoc	Minnesota (NCAA)
7	Emma Peschel (D)	United States	New York Sirens	Ohio State (NCAA)
8	Kirsten Simms (F)	United States	Toronto Sceptres	Wisconsin (NCAA)
9	Sara Swiderski (D)	Canada	Minnesota Frost	Ohio State (NCAA)
10	Grace Dwyer (D)	United States	Boston Fleet	Cornell (NCAA)
11	Vivian Jungels (D)	United States	Ottawa Charge	Wisconsin (NCAA)
12	Petra Nieminen (F)	Finland	Montreal Victoire	Luleå (SDHL)

=== Round two ===
#	Player	Nationality	PWHL team	School/club team
13	Issy Wunder (F)	Canada	Vegas Vanguards (from Vancouver) (Note: Vancouver → Las Vegas. Vancouvers second-round pick went to Las Vegas as the result of a trade on June 17, 2026, that sent a second-round pick (13th overall) and fifth-round pick (49th overall) to Las Vegas in exchange for a second-round pick (17th overall) and Abby Boreen.)	Princeton (NCAA)
14	Sydney Morrow (D)	United States	Seattle Torrent	Minnesota (NCAA)
15	Andrea Brändli (G)	Switzerland	Detroit Clutch	Frölunda HC (SDHL)
16	Sloane Matthews (F)	United States	San Jose Sea Lions	Ohio State (NCAA)
17	Thea Johansson (F)	Sweden	Vancouver Goldeneyes (from Las Vegas)	Minnesota Duluth (NCAA)
18	Jade Iginla (F)	Canada	Hamilton Havoc	Brown (NCAA)
19	Elisa Holopainen (F)	Finland	New York Sirens	Frölunda HC (SDHL)
20	Jamie Nelson (F)	United States	Toronto Sceptres	Minnesota (NCAA)
21	Viivi Vainikka (F)	Finland	Minnesota Frost	Brynäs (SDHL)
22	Casey Borgiel (D)	United States	Detroit Clutch (from Boston) (Note: Boston → Detroit. Boston's second-round pick went to Detroit as the result of a trade on June 16, 2026, that sent a second-round pick (22nd overall) and third-round pick (34th overall) to Detroit in exchange for a third-round pick (27th overall) and Ella Huber.)	Colgate (NCAA)
23	Jordan Ray (F)	United States	Ottawa Charge	Yale (NCAA)
24	Avi Adam (F)	Canada	Montreal Victoire	Cornell (NCAA)

=== Round three ===
#	Player	Nationality	PWHL team	School/club team
25	Jules Constantinople (D)	United States	Vancouver Goldeneyes	Northeastern (NCAA)
26	Emerson Jarvis (F)	Canada	Seattle Torrent	Quinnipiac (NCAA)
27	Leah Stecker (D)	United States	Boston Fleet (from Detroit)	Penn State (NCAA)
28	Tia Chan (G)	China	San Jose Sea Lions	Connecticut (NCAA)
29	Josefin Bouveng (F)	Sweden	Vegas Vanguards	Minnesota (NCAA)
30	Elyssa Biederman (F)	United States	Hamilton Havoc	Colgate (NCAA)
31	Carina DiAntonio (F)	Canada	New York Sirens	Yale (NCAA)
32	Brooke Disher (D)	Canada	Toronto Sceptres	Ohio State (NCAA)
33	Madelyn Christian (F)	United States	Minnesota Frost	Penn State (NCAA)
34	MK O'Brien (F)	United States	Detroit Clutch (from Boston)	Minnesota-Duluth (NCAA)
35	Tereza Pištěková (F)	Czech Republic	Ottawa Charge	SDE Hockey (SDHL)
36	Zoe Uens (D)	Canada	Montreal Victoire	Quinnipiac (NCAA)

=== Round four ===
#	Player	Nationality	PWHL team	School/club team
37	Katie DeSa (G)	United States	Vancouver Goldeneyes	Penn State (NCAA)
38	Grace Elliott (F)	Canada	Seattle Torrent	University of British Columbia (U Sports)
39	Kyla Josifovic (F)	Canada	Detroit Clutch	Connecticut Huskies (NCAA)
40	Lily Shannon (F)	United States	San Jose Sea Lions	Northeastern Huskies (NCAA)
41	Saskia Maurer (G)	Switzerland	Vegas Vanguards	SC Bern (Switzerland)
42	Megan Woodworth (F)	Canada	Hamilton Havoc	Connecticut Huskies (NCAA)
43	Katelyn Roberts (F)	United States	New York Sirens	Penn State (NCAA)
44	Jane Kuehl (F)	United States	Toronto Sceptres	Princeton Tigers (NCAA)
45	Tova Henderson (D)	Canada	Minnesota Frost	Minnesota Duluth (NCAA)
46	Jaden Bogden (F)	Canada	Boston Fleet	Northeastern Huskies (NCAA)
47	Tory Mariano (D)	United States	Ottawa Charge	Northeastern (NCAA)
48	Hailey MacLeod (G)	Canada	Montreal Victoire	Ohio State (NCAA)

=== Round five ===
#	Player	Nationality	PWHL team	School/club team
49	Kendall Butze (D)	United States	Vegas Vanguards (from Vancouver)	Penn State (NCAA)
50	Gracie Gilkyson (D)	Canada	Seattle Torrent	Yale (NCAA)
51	Sena Catterall (F)	Canada	Detroit Clutch	Clarkson (NCAA)
52	McKenna Van Gelder (F)	Canada	San Jose Sea Lions	Cornell (NCAA)
53	Alexis Petford (F)	Canada	Vegas Vanguards	Colgate (NCAA)
54	Emma-Sofie Nordstrøm (G)	Denmark	Hamilton Havoc	St. Lawrence (NCAA)
55	Grace Wolfe (D)	United States	New York Sirens	St. Cloud State (NCAA)
56	Emerson O'Leary (F)	United States	Toronto Sceptres	Princeton (NCAA)
57	Darya Gredzen (G)	Russia	Minnesota Frost	Biryusa Krasnoyarsk (ZhHL)
58	Jenna Goodwin (F)	Canada	Boston Fleet	Frölunda HC (SDHL)
59	Neena Brick (F)	Canada	Ottawa Charge	MoDo (SDHL)
60	Erica Rieder (D)	Canada	Montreal Victoire	Luleå (SDHL)

=== Round six ===
#	Player	Nationality	PWHL team	School/club team
61	Ashley Messier (D)	United States	Vancouver Goldeneyes	Minnesota Duluth (NCAA)
62	Gabriella Durante (G)	Italy	Seattle Torrent	Real Torino (IHLW)
63	Georgia Schiff (F)	United States	Detroit Clutch	Cornell (NCAA)
64	Reichen Kirchmair (F)	Canada	San Jose Sea Lions	Providence (NCAA)
65	Sydney Healey (F)	Canada	Vegas Vanguards	Boston University (NCAA)
66	Mya Vaslet (F)	Canada	Hamilton Havoc	Penn State (NCAA)
67	Naomi Boucher (F)	Canada	New York Sirens	Yale (NCAA)
68	Alyssa Regalado (D)	Canada	Toronto Sceptres	Cornell (NCAA)
69	Lara Beecher (F)	United States	Minnesota Frost	Clarkson (NCAA)
70	Maeve Kelly (D)	United States	Boston Fleet	Boston University (NCAA)
71	Taylor Otremba (F)	United States	Ottawa Charge	Minnesota State (NCAA)
72	Émilie Lavoie (F)	Canada	Montreal Victoire	Concordia (U Sports)
