= Minnesota Frost =

PWHL ice hockey team in Minneapolis-St. Paul

- City: Saint Paul, Minnesota
- League: PWHL
- Conference: Western
- Founded: 2023
- Home arena: Grand Casino Arena
- Colors: Purple, lavender, white
- Owner: Mark Walter Group
- General manager: Melissa Caruso
- Head coach: Ken Klee
- Captain: Kendall Coyne Schofield
- Website: minnesota.thepwhl.com

Championships
- Regular season titles: 0
- Walter Cups: 2 (2023–24, 2024–25)

The Minnesota Frost are a professional ice hockey team based in the Minneapolis–Saint Paul metropolitan area that competes in the Professional Women's Hockey League (PWHL). They are one of the six charter franchises of the league. The team plays its home games at Grand Casino Arena. In 2024, the Frost won the PWHL's inaugural Walter Cup championship. They subsequently won the 2025 championship and played the first round of the 2026 playoffs.

== History ==
=== Founding ===
On August 29, 2023, it was announced that one of the PWHL's first six franchises would be located in Minnesota. The team immediately filled the void left by the loss of the Minnesota Whitecaps, a long-running club that had most recently played in the defunct Premier Hockey Federation. On September 1, Natalie Darwitz, former captain of the United States national team and three-time Olympic medalist, was named the PWHL Minnesota's general manager. On September 15, former Bethel University men's and women's head coach Charlie Burggraf was announced as the first head coach of the team. However, it was announced on December 27 that Burggraf was stepping down, and would be replaced by former U.S. national team coach Ken Klee.

The team's first three player signings were U.S. national team players Kendall Coyne Schofield, Kelly Pannek, and Lee Stecklein. Minnesota was awarded the right to select first overall in the inaugural PWHL draft through a lottery; with the pick, the team selected Minnesota Golden Gophers forward Taylor Heise.

In November, it was revealed that PWHL Minnesota's colors would be purple, black, and white, and that the team would play at Grand Casino Arena, home of the National Hockey League's Minnesota Wild, in Saint Paul.

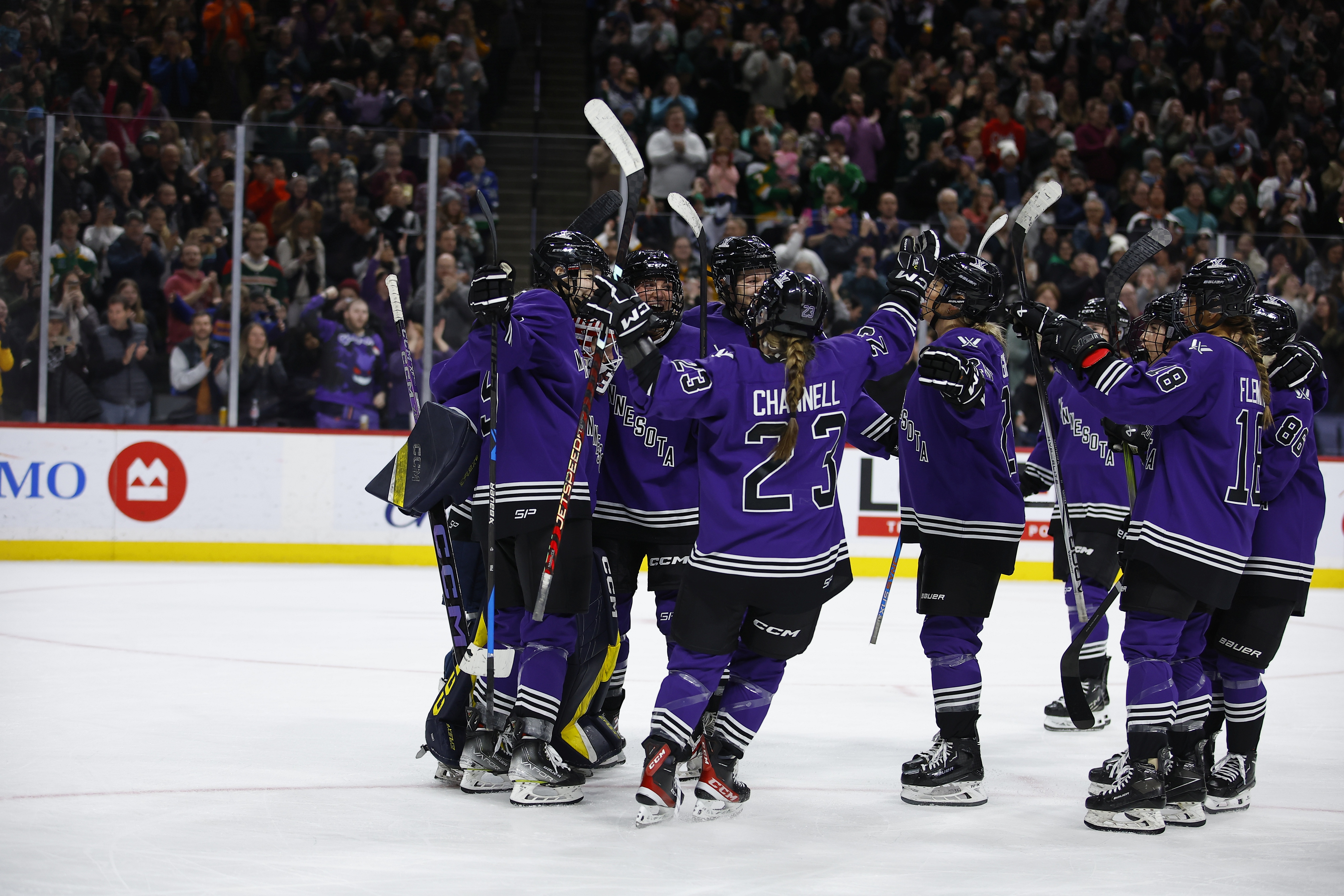
Minnesota celebrating a victory over PWHL Montreal in 2024

=== Inaugural season ===
Ahead of the team's inaugural game in January 2024, it was announced that Kendall Coyne Schofield would serve as team captain, with Kelly Pannek and Lee Stecklein serving as alternate captains. The team played its first game on January 3, facing Pwhl Boston in Lowell, Massachusetts. Taylor Heise scored the first goal in franchise history, and Minnesota went on to win by a score of 3–2. Minnesota made its home debut three days later, on January 6, defeating PWHL Montreal by a score of 3–0 in front of 13,316 fans, which set a new record for attendance at a professional women's hockey game. Grace Zumwinkle recorded a hat-trick in the game, and Maddie Rooney recorded the shutout.

On May 5, 2024, the team secured the fourth seed in the inaugural PWHL playoffs. PWHL Minnesota beat first-ranked PWHL Toronto in a five-game semifinal series, completing a reverse sweep after losing the first two games and advancing to the finals against PWHL Boston. In the finals, PWHL Minnesota won a close-fought series. The championship came down to a decisive Game 5; Minnesota overcame a double-overtime loss in Game 4 at home to win 3–0 on the road at Boston's Tsongas Center. This made Minnesota the PWHL's inaugural Walter Cup champions. Heise led the playoffs in scoring and won the inaugural Ilana Kloss Playoff MVP Award. After the season, Zumwinkle was named the PWHL's rookie of the year.

Natalie Darwitz parted ways with the team in June 2024, with Ken Klee taking over as acting general manager. In September, the team hired Melissa Caruso as its new general manager.

== Season-by-season record ==
Key of colors and symbols
Color/symbol	Explanation
†	Indicates league championship
*	Indicates regular season championship

Year by year results
Season	GP	RW	OW	OL	RL	Pts	GF	GA	GD	Finish	Playoffs
2023–24†	24	8	4	3	9	35	54	54	0	4th	Won Walter Cup, 3–2 (PWHL Boston)
2024–25†	30	10	5	4	11	44	85	76	9	4th	Won Walter Cup, 3–1 (Ottawa Charge)
2025–26	30	13	3	5	9	50	91	73	18	3rd	Lost Semifinal, 2–3 (Montreal Victoire)

== Team identity ==
Inaugural season logo for PWHL Minnesota

Minnesota, along with the other PWHL charter franchises, operated without unique branding for the league's inaugural season—the team was known as PWHL Minnesota and wore a league-wide jersey template that featured the state's name diagonally on the front. The team did have its own colour scheme, featuring purple and black. In October 2023, the league registered a trademark for the name Minnesota Superior, seemingly in reference to Lake Superior. However, in September 2024, when the PWHL unveiled franchise nicknames, Minnesota was given the name "Frost"; the league stated that the nickname was in honor of Minnesota's "deep-rooted love for the ice". A report from The Hockey News stated that other names in contention for Minnesota included the Marmots and the Monarchs. In addition to the Frost name, the team's logo was unveiled—the initial "F" featuring icicles. The team retained its color scheme.

== Players and personnel ==
=== Current roster ===
As of July 17, 2026

No.	Nat	Player	Pos	S/G	Age	Acquired	Birthplace
91	(United States)	Peyton Anderson	F	L	25	2025	Arvada, Colorado
15	(United States)	Brooke Becker	D	R	24	2025	Orchard Park, New York
N/A	(United States)	Lara Beecher	F	R	21	2026	Buffalo, New York
1	(Canada)	Marlène Boissonnault	G	L	29	2025	Dundee, New Brunswick
22	(United States)	Natalie Buchbinder	D	R	27	2023	Fairport, New York
7	(United States)	Claire Butorac	F	R	27	2023	Andover, Minnesota
N/A	(United States)	Maddy Christian	F	L	22	2026	Elk River, Minnesota
8	(Canada)	Samantha Cogan	F	L	29	2026	Ottawa, Ontario
26	(United States)	Kendall Coyne Schofield (C)	F	L	34	2023	Palos Heights, Illinois
18	(Canada)	Élizabeth Giguère	F	R	29	2025	Quebec City, Quebec
N/A	(Russia)	Darya Gredzen	G	R	22	2026	Novosibirsk, Russia
27	(United States)	Taylor Heise	F	R	26	2023	Lake City, Minnesota
N/A	(Canada)	Tova Henderson	D	L	22	2026	Richmond, British Columbia
71	(Czech Republic)	Klára Hymlárová	F	L	27	2024	Opava, Czech Republic
5	(United States)	Sidney Morin	D	R	31	2025	Minnetonka, Minnesota
16	(United States)	Kaitlyn O'Donohoe	F	R	25	2024	Atlanta, Georgia
12	(United States)	Kelly Pannek (A)	F	R	30	2023	Plymouth, Minnesota
14	(United States)	Dominique Petrie	F	R	25	2024	Hermosa Beach, California
33	(United States)	Jincy Roese	D	L	29	2026	O'Fallon, Missouri
35	(United States)	Maddie Rooney	G	L	29	2023	Andover, Minnesota
2	(United States)	Lee Stecklein (A)	D	L	32	2023	Roseville, Minnesota
N/A	(Canada)	Sara Swiderski	D	L	21	2026	Langley, British Columbia
24	(Canada)	Vanessa Upson	F	L	22	2025	Stoney Creek, Ontario
N/A	(Finland)	Viivi Vainikka	F	L	24	2026	Espoo, Finland
13	(United States)	Grace Zumwinkle	F	R	27	2023	Excelsior, Minnesota

=== Team captains ===
- Kendall Coyne Schofield, 2023–present

=== General managers ===
- Natalie Darwitz, 2023–2024
- Melissa Caruso, 2024–present

=== Head coaches ===
- Charlie Burggraf, 2023
- Ken Klee, 2023–present

=== First-round draft picks ===
- 2023: Taylor Heise (1st overall)
- 2024: Claire Thompson (3rd overall)
- 2025: Kendall Cooper (6th overall)
- 2026: Sara Swiderski (9th overall)
