= Hamilton Havoc =

Professional women's ice hockey team in Hamilton

- City: Hamilton, Ontario
- League: PWHL
- Conference: Eastern
- Founded: 2026
- Home arena: TD Coliseum
- Colours: Gold, maroon and cream
- Owner: Mark Walter Group
- General manager: Meghan Duggan
- Head coach: Kris Sparre
- Captain: TBA
- Website: www.thepwhl.com/en/teams/hamilton-havoc

Championships
- Regular season titles: 0
- Walter Cups: 0

The Hamilton Havoc are a professional ice hockey team based in Hamilton, Ontario, that competes in the Professional Women's Hockey League (PWHL). They were announced in May 2026 alongside Las Vegas, Detroit, and San Jose, as part of the league's first round of expansion. The team will play home games at the newly-renovated TD Coliseum.

== History ==
=== Founding ===
On January 3, 2026, the 2025–26 PWHL Takeover Tour came to Hamilton for a neutral-site game between the Seattle Torrent and the Toronto Sceptres; a crowd of 16,012 (the third-largest in the tour and among the top 20 most-attended games in PWHL history) saw the Torrent pick up a 3–2 shootout win over the Sceptres. With more than 70% of game attendees buying their first PWHL ticket and more than 15% of PWHL players hailing from the Golden Horseshoe area which Hamilton anchors, Hamilton stood out among the PWHL's potential expansion cities, proving that they could draw a fanbase distinct from the nearby Sceptres'.

The team's founding and entry into the league was announced on May 13, 2026. They will begin playing in the PWHL during the 2026–27 season.

The team is the league's tenth franchise overall and its fourth expansion team, part of the second round of expansion. The team will play its games at TD Coliseum, which is also the home of the Hamilton Hammers in the American Hockey League (AHL) which will serve as the New York Islanders' affiliate. The team will be the first PWHL team to hail from a non-NHL city.

On May 22, 2026, PWHL Hamilton announced women's hockey veteran Meghan Duggan as the team's inaugural general manager.

The following week it was announced that 2025–26 Boston Fleet head coach Kris Sparre will be the head coach for the new team.

Brianne Jenner became the first player to be signed in the franchise's history as she signed a three-year contract on June 5, 2026.

== Team identity ==
As part of the expansion announcement, the team's colours were revealed to be gold, maroon and cream; gold as an homage to the Hamilton Tiger-Cats of the Canadian Football League and the Hamilton Tigers of NHL antiquity, maroon as a nod to Hamilton's nickname of "Steeltown" and aged steel in particular.

On November 10, the PWHL revealed the team's official name as the Hamilton Havoc. The logo is anchored by Hamilton’s official bird, the peregrine falcon, reimagined in steel with molten eyes. The name draws on the balance between industry and nature in Hamilton, where steel mills rise alongside the Niagara Escarpment.

== Players and personnel ==
=== Current roster ===
As of June 26, 2026

No.	Nat	Player	Pos	S/G	Age	Acquired	Birthplace
26	(Canada)	Emily Clark	F	L	30	2026	Saskatoon, Saskatchewan
61	(Canada)	Nicole Gosling	D	L	24	2026	London, Ontario
74	(Canada)	Abby Hustler	F	L	23	2026	St. Louis, Prince Edward Island
19	(Canada)	Brianne Jenner	F	R	35	2026	Oakville, Ontario
11	(Switzerland)	Alina Müller	F	L	28	2026	Winterthur, Switzerland
82	(Canada)	Kayle Osborne	G	L	24	2026	Westport, Ontario
3	(Canada)	Zoe Boyd	D	L	26	2026	Caledon East, Ontario
13	(United States)	Riley Brengman	D	R	24	2026	China Township, Michigan
20	(United States)	Allyson Simpson	D	R	25	2026	Frisco, Texas
5	(United States)	Peyton Hemp	F	R	23	2026	Andover, Minnesota
14	(Canada)	Alexa Vasko	F	L	27	2026	St. Catharines, Ontario
10	(Canada)	Kayla Vespa	F	L	29	2026	Hamilton, Ontario
71	(Sweden)	Anna Kjellbin	D	R	32	2026	Gothenburg, Sweden
97	(Russia)	Anna Shokhina	F	L	30	2026	Novosinkovo, Russia
9	(Finland)	Nelli Laitinen	D	L	24	2026	Lohja, Finland
21	(Canada)	Jade Iginla	F	R	22	2026	Lake Country, British Columbia
8	(United States)	Elyssa Biederman	F	R	22	2026	Franklin, Michigan
91	(Canada)	Megan Woodworth	F	L	23	2026	Berwick, Nova Scotia
33	(Denmark)	Emma-Sofie Nordström	G	L	24	2026	Herning, Denmark
92	(Canada)	Mya Vaslet	F	L	23	2026	Stittsville, Ontario

=== First-round draft picks ===
- 2026: Nelli Laitinen (6th overall)
