= List of Minnesota Frost players =

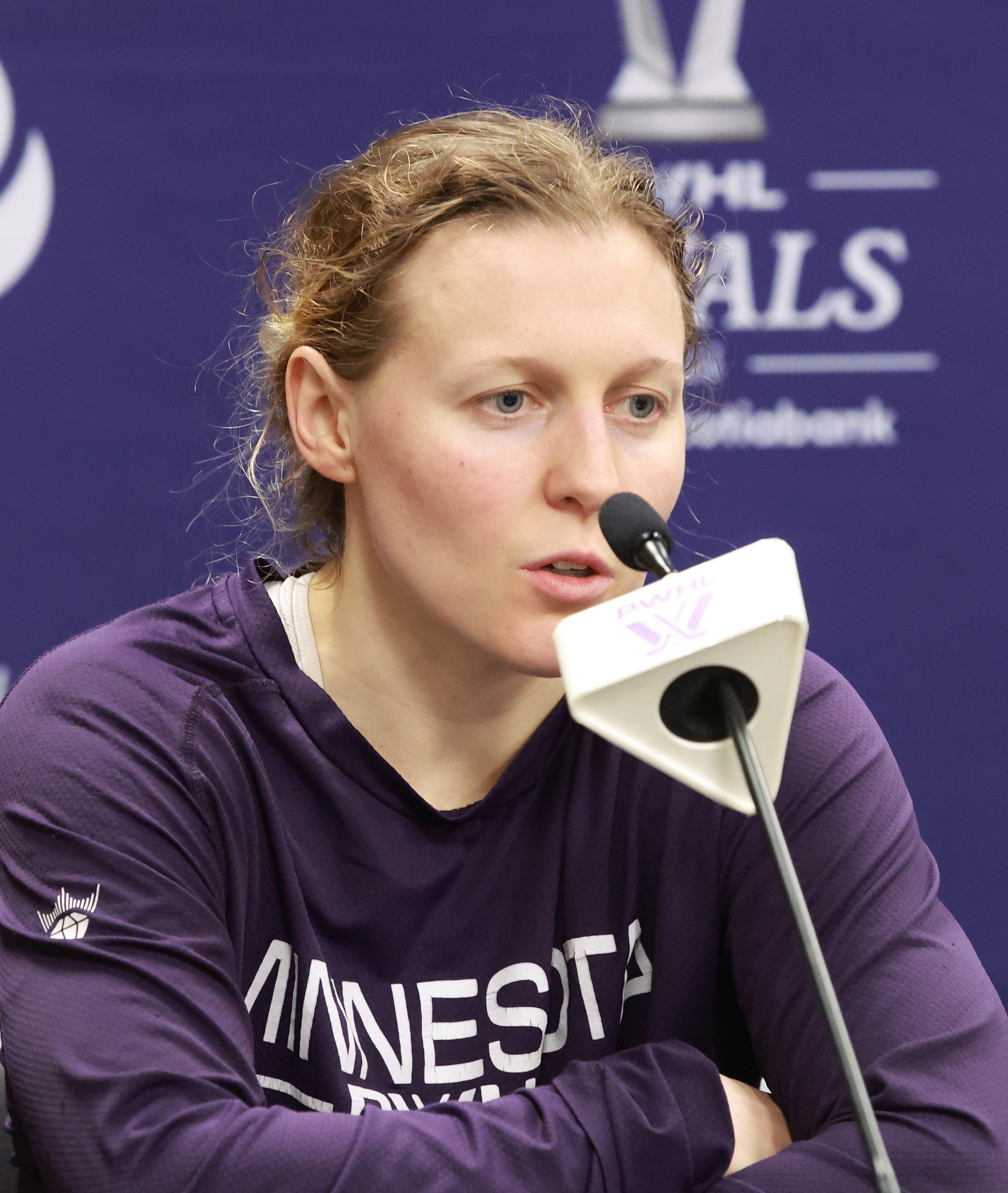
Kendall Coyne Schofield, the first captain in franchise history.

The Minnesota Frost are a professional women's ice hockey team based in Saint Paul, Minnesota. Founded on August 29, 2023, they are one of the six inaugural franchises of the Professional Women's Hockey League (PWHL). The team plays its home games at Grand Casino Arena, which it shares with the Minnesota Wild of the National Hockey League (NHL). As of the end of the 2025–26 PWHL season, 46 players have appeared in at least one game for the Frost; of them, 4 are goaltenders, while 42 are skaters.

Minnesota’s inaugural game took place on January 3, 2024, against PWHL Toronto, ending in a narrow 2–1 loss. The first goal in franchise history was scored by captain Kendall Coyne Schofield. The Frost earned their first win a week later, defeating PWHL Boston 4–2 in front of over 9,000 home fans. Goaltender Nicole Hensley recorded the team’s first shutout on February 9, 2024, making 31 saves in a 3–0 victory over PWHL New York.

The Frost made league history by winning back-to-back Walter Cup championships in 2024 and 2025, becoming the first team to capture the PWHL title. Their playoff success was built on depth scoring, disciplined defense, and timely goaltending, establishing Minnesota as an early dynasty in the league.

== Key ==
Key of colors and symbols
#	Number worn for majority of tenure with the Frost
WC	Walter Cup Champion
*	Current member of the Frost organization (including reserves)
†	Walter Cup champion, retired jersey, or elected to the Hockey Hall of Fame

Skaters
Pos	Position
D	Defenseman
F	Forward

The seasons column lists the first year of the season of the player's first game and the last year of the season of the player's last game. For example, a player who played one game in the 2023–24 season would be listed as playing with the team from 2023–24, regardless of what calendar year the game occurred within.

Statistics are complete to the end of the 2025–26 PWHL season.

== Goaltenders ==
Note: GP = Games played; Min, TOI = Minutes played; W = Wins; L = Losses; OTL = Overtime losses; GA = Goals-against; GAA = Goals-against average; SO = Shutouts; SV% = Save percentage;

Name	#	Nationality	Seasons	Regular season							Playoffs						Notes
Name	#	Nationality	Seasons	GP	W	L	OTL	SO	GAA	SV%	GP	W	L	SO	GAA	SV%	Notes
Boissonnault, Marlène*	1	Canada	2025–present	1	0	0	1	0	3.93	.833	0	0	0	0	0.00	.000	Intact Impact Award 2026
Hensley, Nicole†	29	United States	2023–2026	38	21	13	4	3	2.46	.910	8	4	4	2	1.57	.928	WC 2024, 2025; Intact Impact Award 2025
Morgan, Lucy	32	United States	2024–2025	1	0	1	0	0	5.00	.853	0	0	0	0	0.00	.000	
Rooney, Maddie*†	35	United States	2023–present	45	22	15	7	5	2.06	.914	15	10	5	2	1.55	.936	WC 2024, 2025

== Skaters ==
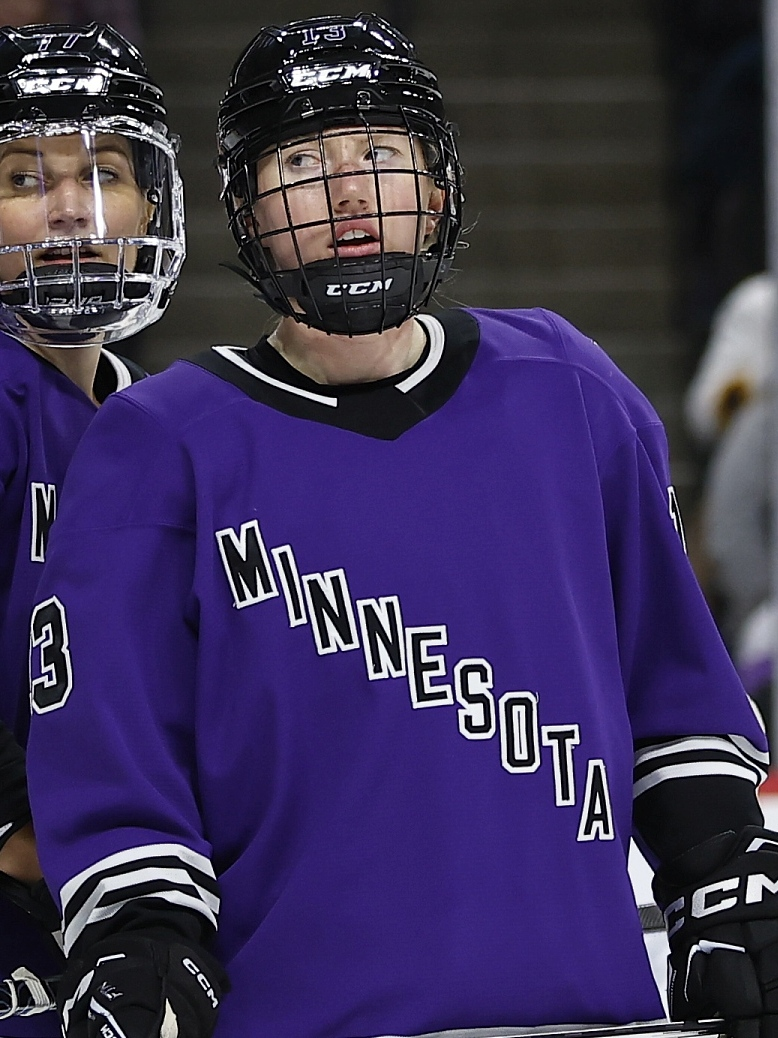
Grace Zumwinkle, the inaugural PWHL Rookie of the Year winner.

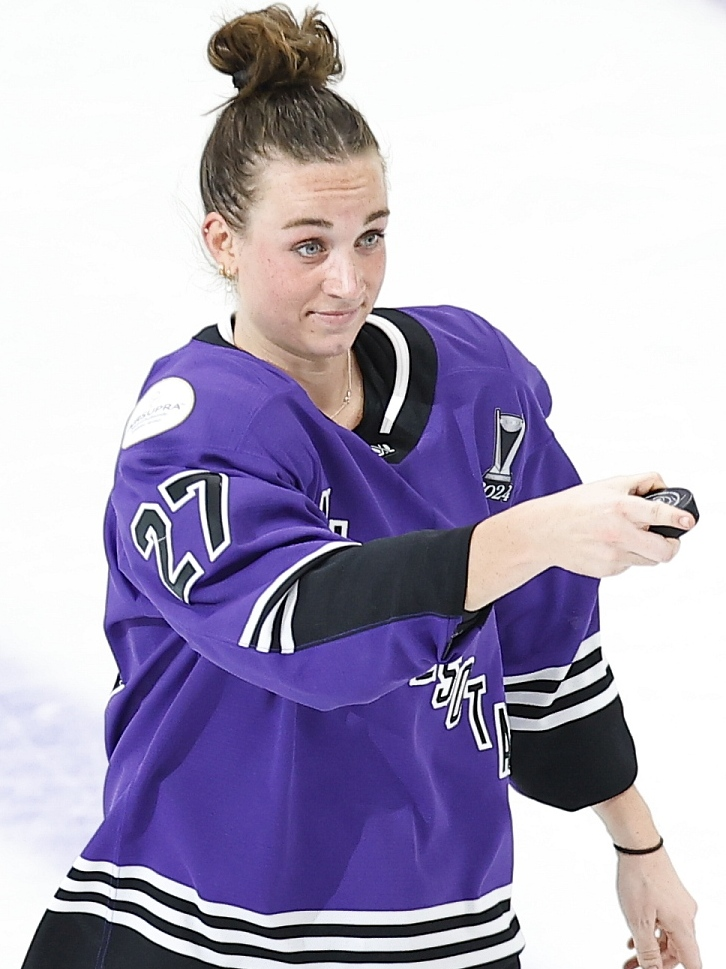
Taylor Heise, the inaugural Ilana Kloss Playoff MVP winner.

Note: GP = Games played; G = Goals; A = Assists; Pts = Points; PIM = Penalty minutes;

Name	#	Nationality	Pos	Seasons	Regular season					Playoffs					Notes
Name	#	Nationality	Pos	Seasons	GP	G	A	Pts	PIM	GP	G	A	Pts	PIM	Notes
Akervik, Charlotte	8	United States	D	2024–2025	2	0	0	0	0	0	0	0	0	0	
Anderson, Peyton*	91	United States	F	2025–present	28	1	1	2	12	5	0	0	0	0	
Batherson, Mae†	21	Canada	D	2024–2026	55	3	15	18	10	8	0	2	2	4	WC 2025
Becker, Brooke*	15	United States	D	2025–present	27	0	1	1	14	5	0	0	0	0	
Bizal, Madison	9	United States	D	2025–2026	16	0	2	2	0	1	0	0	0	0	
Boreen, Abby†	24	United States	F	2023–2024	9	4	1	5	4	5	0	1	1	2	WC 2024
Brodt, Sydney†	10	United States	F	2023–2024	7	0	1	1	2	10	1	1	2	0	WC 2024
Bryant, Brooke*†	17	United States	F	2023–present	48	2	3	5	12	9	0	0	0	0	WC 2024, 2025
Buchbinder, Natalie*†	22	United States	D	2023–present	68	3	7	10	6	18	0	2	2	4	WC 2024, 2025
Butorac, Claire*†	7	United States	F	2023–present	80	3	9	12	16	21	1	2	3	2	WC 2024, 2025
Cava, Michela†	86	Canada	F	2023–2025	54	14	13	27	14	18	7	6	13	8	WC 2024, 2025
Channell-Watkins, Mellissa†	23	Canada	D	2023–2025	53	1	8	9	2	18	1	8	9	2	WC 2024, 2025
Cogan, Samantha*	8	Canada	F	2025–present	6	0	0	0	0	5	1	1	2	2	
Cook, Abby	18	Canada	D	2023–2024	9	1	0	1	6	0	0	0	0	0	
Cooper, Kendall	4	Canada	D	2025–2026	30	2	17	19	4	5	0	0	0	0	
Coyne Schofield, Kendall*†	26	United States	F	2023–present	77	30	33	63	10	23	4	6	10	0	WC 2024, 2025; Captain 2023–present
Curl-Salemme, Britta†	77	United States	F	2024–2026	58	20	24	44	46	11	3	2	5	32	WC 2025
DeGeorge, Clair†	14	United States	F	2023–2024	23	0	1	1	6	10	0	0	0	4	WC 2024
Flaherty, Maggie†	19	United States	D	2023–2025	46	2	6	8	26	16	1	0	1	2	WC 2024, 2025
Fleming, Brittyn†	18	United States	F	2023–2024	23	1	1	2	8	9	0	1	1	2	WC 2024
Fox, Taylor*†	27	United States	F	2023–present	78	25	40	65	26	23	6	11	17	6	WC 2024, 2025; Ilana Kloss Playoff MVP 2024
Giguère, Élizabeth*	18	Canada	F	2025–present	13	0	1	1	6	5	0	0	0	2	
Greco, Emma†	25	Canada	D	2023–2024	22	0	0	0	10	10	0	0	0	6	WC 2024
Hustler, Abby	74	United States	F	2025–2026	30	4	9	13	10	5	0	1	1	6	
Hymlárová, Klára*†	71	Czech Republic	F	2024–present	58	4	6	10	10	13	1	6	7	2	WC 2025
Jaques, Sophie†	16	Canada	D	2023–2025	40	9	23	32	14	18	4	8	12	2	WC 2024, 2025
Knoll, Katy†	6	United States	F	2024–2026	51	8	3	11	24	13	3	3	6	0	WC 2025
Kremer, Dominique†	36	United States	D	2023–2024	12	0	0	0	0	0	0	0	0	0	WC 2024
Křížová, Denisa†	41	Czech Republic	F	2023–2026	77	8	12	20	20	18	2	0	2	6	WC 2024, 2025
Kunin, Sophia†	11	United States	F	2023–2024	24	2	1	3	6	10	1	0	1	2	WC 2024
McQuigge, Brooke†	3	Canada	F	2024–2025	29	8	7	15	25	8	2	1	3	2	WC 2025
Morin, Sidney*	5	United States	D	2025–present	30	0	8	8	2	5	4	0	4	2	
O'Donohoe, Kaitlyn*	16	United States	F	2024–2025	18	1	0	1	0	0	0	0	0	0	
Pannek, Kelly*†	12	United States	F	2023–present	84	23	37	60	20	23	3	8	11	2	PWHL Forward of the Year 2026; PWHL Top Goal Scorer Award 2026; PWHL Points Leader Award 2026; WC 2024, 2025
Petrie, Dominique*†	14	United States	F	2024–present	28	5	8	13	14	7	0	1	1	4	WC 2025
Roese, Jincy*	33	United States	D	2025–present	6	0	1	1	2	5	1	0	1	0	
Schepers, Liz†	21	United States	F	2023–2025	46	2	7	9	8	18	3	5	8	4	WC 2024, 2025
Stecklein, Lee*†	2	United States	D	2023–present	82	6	25	31	28	23	4	9	13	6	WC 2024, 2025
Tapani, Susanna	88	Finland	F	2023–2024	9	2	3	5	2	0	0	0	0	0	
Thompson, Claire†	42	Canada	D	2024–2025	30	4	14	18	8	8	0	6	6	4	WC 2025
Upson, Vanessa*	24	Canada	F	2025–present	28	0	1	1	0	5	0	0	0	0	
Zumwinkle, Grace*†	13	United States	F	2023–present	75	28	24	52	10	23	2	4	6	4	WC 2024, 2025; PWHL Rookie of the Year 2024
