= 2025–26 Minnesota Frost season =

Professional Women's Hockey League season

2025–26 Minnesota Frost
- League: 3rd PWHL
- 2025–26 record: 13–3–5–9
- Home record: 9–0–2–4
- Road record: 4–3–3–5
- Goals for: 91
- Goals against: 73

Team information
- General manager: Melissa Caruso
- Coach: Ken Klee
- Captain: Kendall Coyne Schofield
- Alternate captains: Kelly Pannek; Lee Stecklein
- Arena: Grand Casino Arena
- Average attendance: 8,139

Team leaders
- Goals: Kelly Pannek (16)
- Assists: Britta Curl-Salemme (18)
- Points: Kelly Pannek (33)
- Penalty minutes: Britta Curl-Salemme (22)
- Plus/minus: Kendall Coyne Schofield (+22)
- Wins: Maddie Rooney (9)
- Goals against average: Maddie Rooney (2.04)

The 2025–26 Minnesota Frost season is the team's third season as a member of the Professional Women's Hockey League. They play their home games at the Grand Casino Arena in Saint Paul, Minnesota.

== Offseason ==
=== Coaching changes ===
On August 22, 2025, the Frost announced the hiring of Brianna Decker as an assistant coach. She previously served as an assistant coach for the United States women's national under-18 ice hockey team and will be inducted into the Hockey Hall of Fame as part of the 2025 class. Minnesota also announced the departure of assistant coach Mira Jalosuo.

== Standings ==
Pos	Team	Pld	W	OTW	OTL	L	GF	GA	GD	Pts	Qualification
1	Montreal Victoire (Y)	30	16	6	2	6	78	41	+37	62 (Note: Greater number of games won, excluding games won by Shootout: Montreal 19, Boston 18)	Playoffs
2	Boston Fleet	30	16	5	4	5	74	45	+29	62	Playoffs
3	Minnesota Frost	30	13	3	5	9	91	73	+18	50	Playoffs
4	Ottawa Charge	30	9	8	1	12	71	73	−2	44	Playoffs
5	Toronto Sceptres	30	10	1	6	13	51	72	−21	38	
6	Vancouver Goldeneyes	30	9	3	4	14	68	81	−13	37	
7	New York Sirens	30	9	3	3	15	63	83	−20	36	
8	Seattle Torrent	30	8	1	5	16	64	92	−28	31	

Updated to match(es) played on April 25, 2026. Source: PWHL
(Y) Regular season winner

== Schedule and results ==
=== Preseason ===
The preseason schedule was published on October 8, 2025.

Pre-season camp

Date	Opponent	Score	OT	Decision	Location	Box Score/Recap
November 13	@ New York	5–2		Hensley	Codey Arena	
November 14	@ New York	2–6		Rooney	Codey Arena	

=== Regular season ===
The regular season schedule was published on October 1, 2025.

Regular season schedule (Home: 9–0–2–4; Road: 4–3–3–5)
November: 1–0–0–1, 3 points (Home: 0–0–0–1; Road: 1–0–0–0)

Game	Date	Opponent	Score	OT	Decision	Location	Attendance	Record	Points	Box Score/Recap
1	November 21	Toronto	1–2		Rooney	Grand Casino Arena	9,138	0–0–0–1	0	
2	November 28	@ Seattle	3–0		Hensley	Climate Pledge Arena	16,014	1–0–0–1	3	

December: 3–1–1–1, 12 points (Home: 1–0–1–0; Road: 2–1–0–1)

Game	Date	Opponent	Score	OT	Decision	Location	Attendance	Record	Points	Box Score/Recap
3	December 2	@ Ottawa	5–1		Hensley	TD Place Arena	5,174	2–0–0–1	6	
4	December 7	@ Boston	1–4		Rooney	Agganis Arena	5,338	2–0–0–2	6	
5	December 19	Boston	5–2		Hensley	Grand Casino Arena	7,216	3–0–0–2	9	
6	December 21	Ottawa	2–3	OT	Hensley	Allstate Arena	7,238	3–0–1–2	10	
7	December 27	@ Vancouver	2–1	OT	Rooney	Rogers Place	10,264	3–1–1–2	12	
8	December 30	@ Toronto	5–1		Hensley	Coca-Cola Coliseum	8,318	4–1–1–2	15	

January: 3–1–2–1, 13 points (Home: 3–0–1–0; Road: 0–1–1–1)

Game	Date	Opponent	Score	OT	Decision	Location	Attendance	Record	Points	Box Score/Recap
9	January 3	@ Ottawa	2–5		Rooney	TD Place Arena	8,235	4–1–1–3	15	
10	January 4	@ Montreal	2–3	OT	Rooney	Place Bell	10,172	4–1–2–3	16	
11	January 11	Seattle	6–2		Rooney	Grand Casino Arena	9,787	5–1–2–3	19	
12	January 16	@ New York	3–2	OT	Hensley	Prudential Center	4,244	5–2–2–3	21	
13	January 21	Montreal	1–2	OT	Hensley	Grand Casino Arena	6,113	5–2–3–3	22	
14	January 25	New York	6–2		Rooney	Grand Casino Arena	7,752	6–2–3–3	25	
15	January 28	Vancouver	4–1		Rooney	Grand Casino Arena	5,249	7–2–3–3	28	

March: 4–1–0–3, 14 points (Home: 3–0–0–2; Road: 1–1–0–1)

Game	Date	Opponent	Score	OT	Decision	Location	Attendance	Record	Points	Box Score/Recap
16	March 1	@ Montreal	0–4		Hensley	Place Bell	10,172	7–2–3–4	28	
17	March 8	@ Toronto	3–2	OT	Rooney	Coca-Cola Coliseum	8,604	7–3–3–4	30	
18	March 13	Seattle	4–1		Rooney	Grand Casino Arena	11,120	8–3–3–4	33	
19	March 15	New York	4–3		Hensley	Ball Arena	15,512	9–3–3–4	36	
20	March 18	Ottawa	5–0		Rooney	Grand Casino Arena	6,673	10–3–3–4	39	
21	March 21	@ Vancouver	3–1		Rooney	Pacific Coliseum	10,366	11–3–3–4	42	
22	March 25	Montreal	0–3		Rooney	Grand Casino Arena	6,803	11–3–3–5	42	
23	March 29	Boston	2–4		Hensley	Grand Casino Arena	9,925	11–3–3–6	42	

April: 2–0–2–3, 8 points (Home: 2–0–0–1; Road: 0–0–2–2)

Game	Date	Opponent	Score	OT	Decision	Location	Attendance	Record	Points	Box Score/Recap
24	April 1	@ New York	3–4	OT	Rooney	Prudential Center	4,265	11–3–4–6	43	
25	April 4	Vancouver	6–5		Hensley	Grand Casino Arena	8,392	12–3–4–6	46	
26	April 11	New York	4–1		Rooney	Grand Casino Arena	9,159	13–3–4–6	49	
27	April 15	@ Boston	2–3		Hensley	Tsongas Center	4,170	13–3–4–7	49	
28	April 19	Toronto	0–2		Rooney	Grand Casino Arena	8,530	13–3–4–8	49	
29	April 22	@ Seattle	4–5		Hensley	Climate Pledge Arena	11,982	13–3–4–9	49	
30	April 25	@ Vancouver	3–4	OT	Boissonnault	Pacific Coliseum	11,310	13–3–5–9	50	

Regulation Win (3 points) Overtime/Shootout win (2 points) Overtime/shootout loss (1 point) Regulation Loss (0 points)

=== Playoffs ===
On April 26, the first-place Montreal Victoire announced that they chose to play the third-seeded Minnesota Frost in the first round.

2026 Walter Cup playoffs
First round vs. Montreal Victoire; Montreal won series 3–2

Game	Date	Opponent	Score	OT	Decision	Location	Attendance	Series	Recap
1	May 2	@ Montreal	5–4	OT	Rooney	Place Bell	9,364	1–0	
2	May 5	@ Montreal	0–1	3OT	Rooney	Place Bell	7,530	1–1	
3	May 7	Montreal	1–2		Rooney	Grand Casino Arena	6,516	1–2	
4	May 8	Montreal	3–1		Rooney	Grand Casino Arena	5,312	2–2	
5	May 11	@ Montreal	1–2		Rooney	Place Bell	6,104	2–3	

== Player statistics ==
As of May 17, 2026

=== Skaters ===
Regular Season
Player	GP	G	A	Pts	SOG	+/−	PIM
Kelly Pannek	30	16	17	33	58	+13	6
Taylor Heise	30	13	17	30	89	+18	12
Britta Curl-Salemme	30	11	18	29	64	+7	22
Grace Zumwinkle	29	13	10	23	82	+5	6
Kendall Coyne Schofield	23	12	11	23	71	+22	0
Kendall Cooper	30	2	17	19	45	+9	4
Mae Batherson	30	3	12	15	36	+10	4
Lee Stecklein	28	1	13	14	51	+12	6
Abby Hustler	30	4	9	13	54	+5	10
Katy Knoll	30	7	2	9	41	+2	18
Klára Hymlárová	29	3	5	8	25	–5	6
Sidney Morin	30	0	8	8	47	–6	2
Dominique Petrie	10	2	1	3	27	–3	10
Claire Butorac	30	0	3	3	11	–4	6
Natalie Buchbinder	25	1	1	2	17	+12	4
Peyton Anderson	28	1	1	2	29	–3	12
Madison Bizal	16	0	2	2	5	–1	0
Kaitlyn O'Donohoe	9	1	0	1	5	0	0
Jincy Roese	6	0	1	1	5	–4	2
Élizabeth Giguère	13	0	1	1	14	–4	6
Brooke Becker	27	0	1	1	23	–3	14
Vanessa Upson	28	0	1	1	13	–9	0
Samantha Cogan	6	0	0	0	5	–1	0

Playoffs
Player	GP	G	A	Pts	SOG	+/−	PIM
Sidney Morin	5	4	0	4	19	+2	2
Kelly Pannek	5	1	3	4	14	–1	0
Samantha Cogan	5	1	1	2	9	+1	2
Kendall Coyne Schofield	5	1	1	2	13	+2	0
Grace Zumwinkle	5	1	1	2	17	0	0
Britta Curl-Salemme	4	0	2	2	0	+4	17
Mae Batherson	5	0	2	2	5	–2	4
Taylor Heise	5	0	2	2	18	0	2
Klára Hymlárová	5	0	2	2	7	0	2
Lee Stecklein	5	0	2	2	4	+3	2
Katy Knoll	5	1	0	1	9	+2	0
Jincy Roese	5	1	0	1	6	0	0
Abby Hustler	5	0	1	1	7	–1	6
Madison Bizal	1	0	0	0	0	0	0
Peyton Anderson	5	0	0	0	0	–1	0
Brooke Becker	5	0	0	0	5	–1	0
Claire Butorac	5	0	0	0	1	–2	0
Kendall Cooper	5	0	0	0	9	0	0
Élizabeth Giguère	5	0	0	0	8	–1	2
Vanessa Upson	5	0	0	0	1	–1	0

=== Goaltenders ===
Regular Season
Player	GP	TOI	W	L	OT	SOL	GA	GAA	SA	SV%	SO	G	A	PIM
Maddie Rooney	16	971:39	9	5	2	0	33	2.04	419	0.921	1	0	0	0
Nicole Hensley	13	780:49	7	4	2	0	35	2.69	382	0.908	1	0	0	0
Marlène Boissonnault	1	61:08	0	0	1	0	4	3.93	24	0.833	0	0	0	0

Playoffs
Player	GP	TOI	W	L	OT	SOL	GA	GAA	SA	SV%	SO	G	A	PIM
Maddie Rooney	5	344:14	2	2	1	0	10	1.74	143	0.930	0	0	1	0

== Awards and honors ==
=== Milestones ===
Regular season
Date	Player	Milestone
November 21, 2025	Peyton Anderson	1st career PWHL game
November 21, 2025	Peyton Anderson	1st career PWHL penalty
November 21, 2025	Kendall Cooper	1st career PWHL game
November 21, 2025	Abby Hustler	1st career PWHL game
November 21, 2025	Vanessa Upson	1st career PWHL game
November 21, 2025	Katy Knoll	30th career PWHL game
November 28, 2025	Kelly Pannek	10th career PWHL goal
November 28, 2025	Abby Hustler	1st career PWHL assist
November 28, 2025	Nicole Hensley	5th career PWHL shutout
November 28, 2025	Brooke Becker	1st career PWHL game
December 2, 2025	Kendall Coyne Schofield	1st career PWHL hat-trick
December 2, 2025	Kendall Coyne Schofield	25th career PWHL goal
December 2, 2025	Lee Stecklein	20th career PWHL assist
December 2, 2025	Britta Curl-Salemme	10th career PWHL assist
December 19, 2025	Dominique Petrie	5th career PWHL goal
December 19, 2025	Denisa Křížová	10th career PWHL assist
December 19, 2025	Kendall Cooper	1st career PWHL assist
December 21, 2025	Mae Batherson	1st career PWHL goal
December 21, 2025	Mae Batherson	5th career PWHL assist
December 21, 2025	Kelly Pannek	30th career PWHL assist
December 27, 2025	Abby Hustler	1st career PWHL goal
December 30, 2025	Britta Curl-Salemme	15th career PWHL goal
December 30, 2025	Katy Knoll	5th career PWHL goal
December 30, 2025	Kendall Cooper	5th career PWHL assist
January 3, 2026	Brooke Becker	1st career PWHL penalty
January 4, 2026	Kendall Coyne Schofield	30th career PWHL assist
January 4, 2026	Abby Hustler	1st career PWHL penalty
January 11, 2026	Taylor Heise	20th career PWHL goal
January 11, 2026	Taylor Heise	40th career PWHL assist
January 11, 2026	Grace Zumwinkle	20th career PWHL goal
January 11, 2026	Britta Curl-Salemme	15th career PWHL assist
January 11, 2026	Sidney Morin	15th career PWHL assist
January 16, 2026	Kendall Coyne Schofield	30th career PWHL goal
January 21, 2026	Kelly Pannek	15th career PWHL goal
January 25, 2026	Mae Batherson	10th career PWHL assist
January 25, 2026	Abby Hustler	5th career PWHL assist
January 28, 2026	Kendall Cooper	1st career PWHL goal
January 28, 2026	Grace Zumwinkle	20th career PWHL assist
January 28, 2026	Brooke Becker	1st career PWHL assist
March 8. 2026	Denisa Křížová	10th career PWHL goal
March 13, 2026	Peyton Anderson	1st career PWHL goal
March 13, 2026	Claire Butorac	10th career PWHL assist
March 13, 2026	Kendall Cooper	10th career PWHL assist
March 15, 2026	Britta Curl-Salemme	20th career PWHL goal
March 15, 2026	Vanessa Upson	1st career PWHL assist
March 18, 2026	Kelly Pannek	20th career PWHL goal
March 18, 2026	Kaitlyn O'Donohoe	1st career PWHL goal
March 18, 2026	Madison Bizal	5th career PWHL assist
March 18, 2026	Maddie Rooney	5th career PWHL shutout
March 29, 2026	Lee Stecklein	10th career PWHL goal
March 29, 2026	Klára Hymlárová	10th career PWHL assist
April 1, 2026	Britta Curl-Salemme	20th career PWHL assist
April 4, 2026	Katy Knoll	10th career PWHL goal
April 11, 2026	Kelly Pannek	40th career PWHL assist
April 15, 2026	Lee Stecklein	30th career PWHL assist
April 15, 2026	Kendall Cooper	15th career PWHL assist
April 15, 2026	Katy Knoll	5th career PWHL assist
April 22, 2026	Kelly Pannek	30th point this season (PWHL record)
April 22, 2026	Taylor Heise	30th point this season (PWHL record)
April 22, 2026	Taylor Heise	30th career PWHL goal
April 25, 2026	Klára Hymlárová	5th career PWHL goal
April 25, 2026	Mae Batherson	15th career PWHL assist
April 25, 2026	Marlène Boissonnault	1st career PWHL overtime loss
April 25, 2026	Marlène Boissonnault	1st career PWHL game

Playoffs
Date	Player	Milestone
May 2, 2026	Sidney Morin	1st career PWHL playoff goal
May 2, 2026	Sidney Morin	5th career PWHL goal
May 2, 2026	Jincy Roese	1st career PWHL playoff goal
May 2, 2026	Taylor Heise	10th career PWHL playoff assist
May 2, 2026	Klára Hymlárová	5th career PWHL playoff assist
May 8, 2026	Britta Curl-Salemme	1st career PWHL playoff assist
May 8, 2026	Samantha Cogan	1st career PWHL assist
May 8, 2026	Samantha Cogan	1st career PWHL playoff assist
May 8, 2026	Mae Batherson	1st career PWHL playoff assist
May 8, 2026	Maddie Rooney	1st career PWHL assist
May 8, 2026	Maddie Rooney	1st career PWHL playoff assist

=== Awards ===
==== Player of the Week ====
Player of the Week recipients
Week	Player
December 8, 2025	Kendall Coyne Schofield
March 9, 2026	Taylor Heise
March 23, 2026	Kelly Pannek

==== Starting Six ====
The Starting Six is voted on each month by the Women's Chapter of the Professional Hockey Writers' Association (PHWA) and PWHL broadcast personnel. The following are Minnesota Frost players who have been named to the Starting Six.

Starting Six players
Month	Position	Player
December	F	Kendall Coyne Schofield
December	F	Britta Curl-Salemme
January	F	Taylor Heise
March (Note: This includes the post-Olympic games from February 26–28.)	F	Kelly Pannek

== Transactions ==
=== Draft ===
The 2025 PWHL Draft was held on June 24, 2025.

Drafted prospect signings
Date	Player	Draft	Term	Ref
July 9, 2025	Kendall Cooper	First round, sixth overall (2025)	Two years	
July 17, 2025	Abby Hustler	Second round, 14th overall (2025)	Two years	
July 29, 2025	Anna Segedi	Third round, 22nd overall (2025)	Two years	
November 20, 2025	Vanessa Upson	Fifth round, 38th overall (2025)	One year	
November 20, 2025	Brooke Becker	Sixth round, 46th overall (2025)	One year	
November 20, 2025	Ava Rinker	Fourth round, 30th overall (2025)	Reserve player contract	

=== Free agent signings ===
Free agent signings
Date	Player	Position	Term	Previous team	Ref
June 20, 2025	Sidney Morin	D	Two years	Boston Fleet	
November 20, 2025	Madison Bizal	D	One year	SDE Hockey (SDHL)	
November 20, 2025	Peyton Anderson	F	One year	Northeastern University (HE)	
November 20, 2025	Élizabeth Giguère	F	Reserve player contract	Ottawa Charge	

=== Contract extensions ===
Player contract extensions
Date	Player	Term	Ref
June 16, 2025	Natalie Buchbinder	Two years	
June 17, 2025	Maddie Rooney	Three years	
June 22, 2025	Mae Batherson	Two years	
June 22, 2025	Claire Butorac	One year	
June 27, 2025	Katy Knoll	One year	
July 17, 2025	Marlène Boissonnault	One year	
August 6, 2025	Dominique Petrie	Two years	
October 6, 2025	Britta Curl-Salemme	Two years	
November 20, 2025	Kaitlyn O'Donohoe	Reserve player contract (Note: Was a reserve player for the 2024–25 season.)	

=== Trades ===
Trades involving the Frost
Date	Details		Ref
November 19, 2025	To Minnesota Frost Denisa Křížová	To Vancouver Goldeneyes Anna Segedi	

=== Reserve activations ===
Reserve player activations
Date	Activated player	Absent player	Notes	Ref
January 8, 2026	Kaitlyn O'Donohoe	Dominique Petrie	LTIR	
February 27, 2026	Élizabeth Giguère	Kendall Coyne Schofield	LTIR	
