= List of Minnesota Frost draft picks =

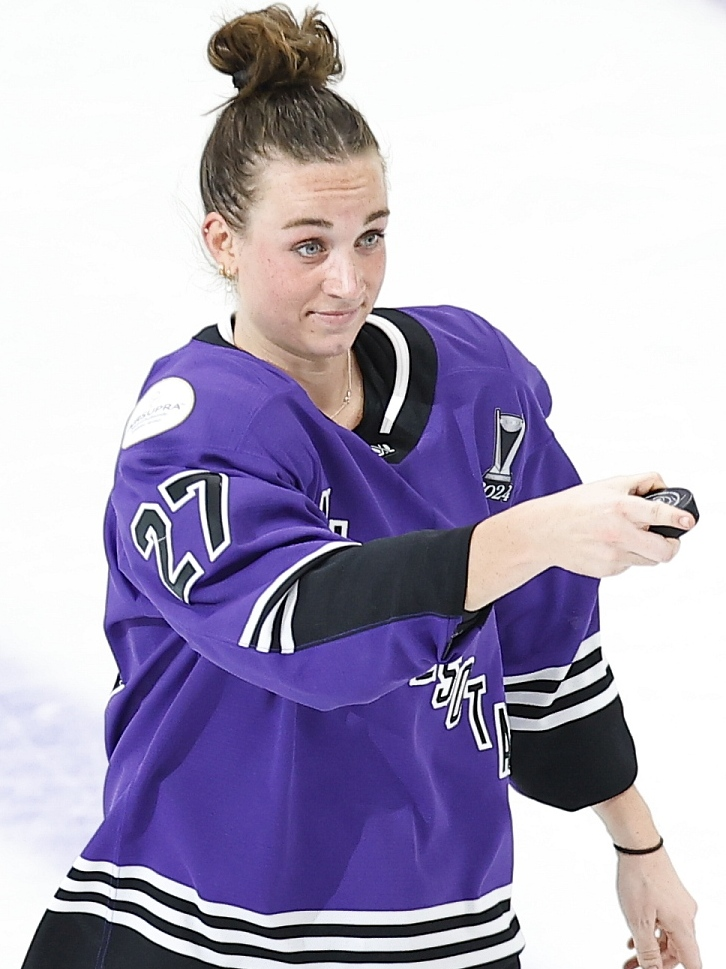
Taylor Heise was the first ever draft selection for Minnesota, taken first overall in 2023.

The Minnesota Frost are a professional ice hockey team in the Professional Women's Hockey League (PWHL). Their first draft pick was Taylor Heise, selected first overall in the 2023 PWHL draft. The Frost have participated in four PWHL Drafts and have drafted 34 players.

== Key ==
General terms and abbreviations
Term or abbreviation	Definition
Draft	The year that the player was selected
Round	The round of the draft in which the player was selected
Pick	The overall position in the draft at which the player was selected
Pos	Position of the player

Position abbreviations
Abbreviation	Definition
G	Goaltender
D	Defense
LW	Left wing
C	Center
RW	Right wing
F	Forward

== Draft picks ==
Full list of Minnesota Frost draft picks
Draft	Round	Pick	Player	Nationality	Pos	School/club team	Conference/league
2023	1	1	Taylor Heise	United States	F	University of Minnesota	WCHA
2023	2	12	Nicole Hensley	United States	G	Team Sonnet	PWHPA
2023	3	13	Grace Zumwinkle	United States	F	University of Minnesota	WCHA
2023	4	24	Maggie Flaherty	United States	D	University of Minnesota Duluth	WCHA
2023	5	25	Susanna Tapani	Finland	F	— (Note: Tapani did not play for a school or club team during the 2022–23 season. She had most recently played in the 2021–22 season for the KRS Vanke Rays of the Zhenskaya Hockey League.)	—
2023	6	36	Clair DeGeorge	United States	F	Team Harvey's	PWHPA
2023	7	37	Natalie Buchbinder	United States	D	University of Wisconsin	WCHA
2023	8	48	Denisa Křížová	Czechia	F	Minnesota Whitecaps	PHF
2023	9	49	Sidney Morin	United States	D	Minnesota Whitecaps	PHF
2023	10	60	Sophia Kunin	United States	F	Team Harvey's	PWHPA
2023	11	61	Amanda Leveille	Canada	G	Minnesota Whitecaps	PHF
2023	12	72	Michela Cava	Canada	F	Toronto Six	PHF
2023	13	73	Liz Schepers	United States	F	Minnesota Whitecaps	PHF
2023	14	84	Minttu Tuominen	Finland	D	Kiekko-Espoo	NSML
2023	15	85	Sydney Brodt	United States	F	Minnesota Whitecaps	PHF
2024	1	3	Claire Thompson	Canada	D	— (Note: Thompson did not play for a school or club team during the 2023–24 season. She had most recently played in the 2022–23 season in the Professional Women's Hockey Players Association.)	—
2024	2	9	Britta Curl	United States	F	University of Wisconsin	WCHA
2024	3	15	Klára Hymlárová	Czechia	F	St. Cloud State University	WCHA
2024	4	21	Brooke McQuigge	Canada	F	Clarkson University	ECAC
2024	5	27	Dominique Petrie	United States	F	Clarkson University	ECAC
2024	6	33	Mae Batherson	Canada	D	St. Lawrence University	ECAC
2024	7	39	Katy Knoll	United States	F	Northeastern University	Hockey East
2025	1	6	Kendall Cooper	Canada	D	Quinnipiac University	WCHA
2025	2	14	Abby Hustler	Canada	F	St. Lawrence University	ECAC
2025	3	22	Anna Segedi	United States	F	St. Lawrence University	ECAC
2025	4	30	Ava Rinker	United States	D	University of Connecticut	Hockey East
2025	5	38	Vanessa Upson	Canada	F	Mercyhurst University	AHA
2025	6	46	Brooke Becker	United States	D	Providence College	Hockey East
2026	1	9	Sara Swiderski	Canada	D	Ohio State University	WCHA
2026	2	21	Viivi Vainikka	Finland	F	Brynäs	SDHL
2026	3	33	Maddy Christian	United States	F	Penn State University	AHA
2026	4	45	Tova Henderson	Canada	D	University of Minnesota Duluth	WCHA
2026	5	57	Darya Gredzen	Russia	G	Biryusa Krasnoyarsk	ZhHL
2026	6	69	Lara Beecher	United States	F	Clarkson University	ECAC
