= 2023–24 NCAA Division I women's ice hockey rankings =

Women's ice hockey rankings

- NCAA tournament: 2024
- Preseason No. 1 (USA Today): Wisconsin
- Preseason No. 1 (USCHO): Wisconsin
- NCAA Division I women's ice hockey rankings

Two polls make up the 2023–24 NCAA Division I women's ice hockey rankings, the USCHO.com poll and the USA Today/USA Hockey Magazine poll. As the 2023–24 season progresses, rankings are updated weekly.

== Legend ==
	Increase in ranking
	Decrease in ranking
	Not ranked previous week
Italics	Number of first place votes
(#-#)	Win–loss–tie record
т	Tied with team above or below also with this symbol

== USCHO ==
	Preseason Sep 18	Week 1 Oct 2	Week 2 Oct 9	Week 3 Oct 16	Week 4 Oct 23	Week 5 Oct 30	Week 6 Nov 6	Week 7 Nov 13	Week 8 Nov 20	Week 9 Nov 27	Week 10 Dec 4	Week 11 Dec 11	Week 12 Jan 8	Week 13 Jan 15	Week 14 Jan 22	Week 15 Jan 29	Week 16 Feb 5	Week 17 Feb 12	Week 18 Feb 19	Week 19 Feb 26	Week 20 Mar 4	Week 21 Mar 11	Final Mar 25	
1.	Wisconsin (15)	Wisconsin (2–0–0) (20)	Wisconsin (4–0–0) (20)	Wisconsin (6–0–0) (20)	Wisconsin (8–0–0) (20)	Wisconsin (10–0–0) (19)	Wisconsin (12–0–0) (18)	Wisconsin (12–0–0) (17)	Ohio State (11–1–0) (18)	Ohio State (13–1–0) (20)	Ohio State (14–2–0) (14)	Ohio State (16–2–0) (18)	Ohio State (16–2–0) (20)	Ohio State (18–2–0) (20)	Ohio State (20–2–0) (20)	Ohio State (22–2–0) (20)	Ohio State (24–2–0) (20)	Ohio State (26–2–0) (20)	Ohio State (28–2–0) (20)	Ohio State (29–3–0) (20)	Ohio State (31–3–0) (20)	Ohio State (32–4–0) (14)	Ohio State (35–4–0) (20)	1.
2.	Ohio State (4)	Ohio State (1–1–0)	Ohio State (1–1–0)	Ohio State (3–1–0)	Ohio State (5–1–0)	Ohio State (7–1–0) (1)	Ohio State (9–1–0) (2)	Ohio State (9–1–0) (3)	Colgate (13–1–0) (2)	Wisconsin (12–2–0)	Minnesota (13–2–0) (3)	Minnesota (14–3–1)	Minnesota (16–3–1)	Wisconsin (18–4–0)	Wisconsin (20–4–0)	Wisconsin (22–4–0)	Wisconsin (24–4–0)	Wisconsin (26–4–0)	Wisconsin (28–4–0)	Wisconsin (29–5–0)	Wisconsin (31–5–0)	Wisconsin (33–5–0) (6)	Wisconsin (35–6–0)	2.
3.	Minnesota	Colgate (1–1–0)	Colgate (3–1–0)	Colgate (5–1–0)	Colgate (5–1–0)	Colgate (7–1–0)	Colgate (9–1–0)	Colgate (11–1–0)	Wisconsin (12–2–0)	Minnesota (11–2–0)	Wisconsin (13–3–0) (1)	Wisconsin (14–4–0)	Wisconsin (16–4–0)	Clarkson (21–1–2)	Clarkson (23–1–2)	Colgate (24–3–1)	Clarkson (25–3–2)	Clarkson (27–3–2)	Clarkson (29–3–2)	Clarkson (29–3–2)	Clarkson (31–3–2)	Colgate (31–6–1)	Colgate (32–7–1)	3.
4.	Colgate (1)	Minnesota (0–0–0)	Minnesota (2–0–0)	Minnesota (4–0–0)	Minnesota (5–0–0)	Minnesota (5–2–0)	Minnesota (7–2–0)	Minnesota (7–2–0)	Minnesota (9–2–0)	Colgate (13–2–1)	Colgate (13–2–1) (1)	Colgate (14–2–1)	Clarkson (19–1–2)	Colgate (20–3–1)	Colgate (22–3–1)	Clarkson (24–2–2)	Colgate (24–5–1)	Colgate (26–5–1)	Minnesota (24–7–1)	Minnesota (25–7–2)	Colgate (29–6–1)	Clarkson (32–4–2)	Clarkson (33–5–2)	4.
5.	Northeastern	Yale (0–0–0)	Yale (0–0–0)	Yale (0–0–0)	Quinnipiac (8–0–0)	Clarkson (9–0–1)	Clarkson (11–0–1)	Clarkson (13–0–1)	Clarkson (14–0–2)	Clarkson (16–0–2)	Clarkson (18–0–2) (1)	Clarkson (18–0–2) (2)	Colgate (17–3–1)	Minnesota (16–5–1)	Minnesota (18–5–1)	Minnesota (20–5–1)	Minnesota (22–5–1)	Minnesota (24–5–1)	Colgate (27–6–1)	Colgate (27–6–1)	Minnesota (27–8–2)	Minnesota (27–9–2)	Minnesota (27–10–2)	5.
6.	Yale	Minnesota Duluth (0–0–0)	Minnesota Duluth (2–0–0)	Quinnipiac (6–0–0)	Clarkson (7–0–1)	St. Lawrence (8–1–0)	St. Lawrence (10–1–0)	Cornell (10–0–1)	St. Lawrence (12–3–0)	Minnesota Duluth (9–4–1)	Minnesota Duluth (10–5–1)	Minnesota Duluth (11–6–1)	Quinnipiac (19–3–1)	Quinnipiac (21–3–1)	Cornell (15–5–1)	Cornell (17–5–1)	Cornell (18–6–1)	Cornell (20–6–1)	Cornell (22–6–1)	Cornell (22–6–1)	Cornell (24–6–1)	Cornell (24–7–1)	Cornell (25–8–1)	6.
7.	Minnesota Duluth	Northeastern (3–1–0)	Northeastern (5–1–0)	Clarkson (5–0–1)	Yale (1–1–0)	Yale (3–1–0)	Cornell (8–0–1) т	St. Lawrence (10–3–0)	Quinnipiac (12–3–0)	Quinnipiac (14–3–0)	Quinnipiac (16–3–0)	St. Cloud State (13–6–1)	Minnesota Duluth (11–7–2)	Minnesota Duluth (13–7–2)	Minnesota Duluth (13–9–2)	Minnesota Duluth (13–11–2)	St. Lawrence (21–9–0)	St. Lawrence (23–9–0)	St. Lawrence (25–9–0)	St. Lawrence (25–9–0)	St. Lawrence (27–9–0)	St. Lawrence (27–10–0)	St. Lawrence (28–11–0)	7.
8.	Quinnipiac	Quinnipiac (2–0–0)	Quinnipiac (4–0–0)	Minnesota Duluth (2–2–0)	Minnesota Duluth (4–2–0)	Minnesota Duluth (6–2–0)	Minnesota Duluth (8–2–0) т	Minnesota Duluth (8–2–0)	Cornell (10–2–1)	St. Lawrence (12–5–0)	St. Cloud State (12–5–0)	Quinnipiac (17–3–0)	Cornell (13–3–1) т	Cornell (13–5–1)	Quinnipiac (21–5–1)	St. Lawrence (19–9–0)	Minnesota Duluth (15–11–2)	Minnesota Duluth (17–11–2)	Minnesota Duluth (18–11–3)	Minnesota Duluth (18–12–4)	Minnesota Duluth (20–12–4)	Minnesota Duluth (20–13–4)	Minnesota Duluth (21–14–4)	8.
9.	Clarkson	Clarkson (4–0–0)	Clarkson (5–0–1)	Cornell (2–0–0)	Cornell (4–0–1)	Quinnipiac (8–2–0)	Quinnipiac (10–2–0)	Quinnipiac (11–2–0)	Minnesota Duluth (8–4–0)	Cornell (11–3–1)	Cornell (11–3–1)	Cornell (11–3–1)	St. Cloud State (13–6–1) т	St. Cloud State (14–7–1)	St. Lawrence (18–8–0)	Quinnipiac (21–7–1)	Quinnipiac (22–7–1)	Quinnipiac (22–9–1)	Quinnipiac (24–9–1)	Quinnipiac (25–9–1)	Quinnipiac (25–11–1)	Connecticut (25–7–5)	Connecticut (25–8–5)	9.
10.	Cornell	Cornell (0–0–0)	Cornell (0–0–0)	Northeastern (5–2–0)	St. Lawrence (6–1–0)	Cornell (6–0–1)	St. Cloud State (9–4–0)	St. Cloud State (9–4–0)	St. Cloud State (11–4–0)	St. Cloud State (11–4–0)	St. Lawrence (13–6–0)	St. Lawrence (13–6–0)	St. Lawrence (13–8–0)	St. Lawrence (15–8–0)	St. Cloud State (15–8–1)	St. Cloud State (15–10–1)	St. Cloud State (15–12–1)	St. Cloud State (15–14–1)	St. Cloud State (15–15–2)	St. Cloud State (17–15–2)	Connecticut (23–7–5)	Quinnipiac (25–11–1)	Quinnipiac (25–11–1)	10.
11.	Penn State	Penn State (1–2–1)	St. Lawrence (4–0–0)	St. Lawrence (5–1–0)	St. Cloud State (7–2–0)	St. Cloud State (9–2–0)	Yale (3–3–0)	Yale (5–3–0)	Connecticut (9–3–1)	Connecticut (10–4–1)	Connecticut (11–4–2)	Connecticut (11–4–2)	Princeton (11–5–2)	Connecticut (14–6–2)	Connecticut (16–6–2)	Connecticut (17–6–3)	Connecticut (18–6–4)	Connecticut (19–6–5)	Connecticut (20–7–5)	Connecticut (22–7–5)	St. Cloud State (17–17–2)	St. Cloud State (17–17–2)	St. Cloud State (17–17–2)	11.
12.	Vermont	St. Cloud State (2–0–0)	Vermont (0–1–1)	Vermont (1–2–1)	Vermont (3–2–1)	Vermont (5–2–1)	Connecticut (5–3–1)	Connecticut (7–3–1)	Princeton (7–4–1)	Princeton (7–4–1)	Princeton (8–4–2)	Princeton (9–5–2)	Connecticut (11–6–2)	Princeton (12–5–3)	Princeton (12–7–3)	Princeton (12–7–5)	Princeton (12–8–5)	Princeton (12–10–5)	Northeastern (23–9–2)	Princeton (14–10–6)	Princeton (14–12–6)	Princeton (14–12–6)	Princeton (14–12–6)	12.
13.	St. Cloud State	Vermont (0–0–0)	Penn State (1–4–1)	St. Cloud State (5–1–0)	Northeastern (6–3–0)	Northeastern (7–4–0)	Vermont (5–3–1)	Princeton (6–3–1)	Yale (5–5–0)	Vermont (7–6–1)	Boston College (9–7–2) т	Boston College (9–7–2)	Boston College (11–7–2)	Boston College (12–7–3)	Boston College (13–7–4)	Northeastern (18–9–1)	Northeastern (20–9–1)	Northeastern (21–9–2)	Princeton (13–10–6)	Yale (16–13–1)	Northeastern (24–10–3)	Northeastern (25–11–3)	Penn State (22–13–3)	13.
14.	Providence	Connecticut (1–0–1)	St. Cloud State (3–1–0)	Princeton (2–0–0)	Princeton (3–1–0)	Boston College (5–4–1)	Princeton (4–3–1)	Vermont (6–4–1)	Boston College (8–6–1)	Yale (6–6–0)	Yale (8–6–0) т	Yale (9–7–0)	Northeastern (13–8–0) т	Yale (10–9–0)	Northeastern (15–9–1)	Yale (11–11–1)	Penn State (18–11–1)	Yale (14–12–1)	Yale (15–13–1)	Northeastern (23–10–3)	Yale (16–15–1)	Penn State (22–12–3)	Northeastern (25–11–3)	14.
15.	Princeton	Providence (0–0–0)	Connecticut (1–0–1)	Penn State (1–6–1)	Penn State (1–6–1)	Princeton (3–3–0)	Boston College (6–5–1)	Boston College (7–6–1)	Vermont (6–6–1)	Boston College (8–7–1)	Penn State (10–7–1)	Penn State (11–8–1)	Yale (10–9–0) т	Northeastern (13–9–1)	Yale (10–11–0)	Boston College (13–8–6) т Penn State (16–11–1) т	Boston College (14–9–6)	Boston College (14–9–7)	Penn State (19–12–3)	Penn State (21–12–3)	Penn State (22–12–3)	Yale (16–15–1)	Yale (16–15–1)	15.
	Preseason Sep 18	Week 1 Oct 2	Week 2 Oct 9	Week 3 Oct 16	Week 4 Oct 23	Week 5 Oct 30	Week 6 Nov 6	Week 7 Nov 13	Week 8 Nov 20	Week 9 Nov 27	Week 10 Dec 4	Week 11 Dec 11	Week 12 Jan 8	Week 13 Jan 15	Week 14 Jan 22	Week 15 Jan 29	Week 16 Feb 5	Week 17 Feb 12	Week 18 Feb 19	Week 19 Feb 26	Week 20 Mar 4	Week 21 Mar 11	Final Mar 25	
		Dropped: Princeton	Dropped: Providence	Dropped: Connecticut	None	Dropped: Penn State	Dropped: Northeastern	None	None	None	Dropped: Vermont	None	Dropped: Penn State	None	None	None	Dropped: Yale	Dropped: Penn State	Dropped: Boston College	None	None	None	None	

== USA Today ==
	Preseason Sep 19	Week 1 Sep 25	Week 2 Oct 3	Week 3 Oct 10	Week 4 Oct 17	Week 5 Oct 24	Week 6 Oct 31	Week 7 Nov 7	Week 8 Nov 14	Week 9 Nov 21	Week 10 Nov 28	Week 11 Dec 5	Week 12 Dec 12	Week 13 Jan 9	Week 14 Jan 16	Week 15 Jan 23	Week 16 Jan 30	Week 17 Feb 6	Week 18 Feb 13	Week 19 Feb 20	Week 20 Feb 27	Week 21 Mar 5	Week 22 Mar 12	Final Mar 19	
1.	Wisconsin (18)	Wisconsin (0–0–0) (19)	Wisconsin (2–0–0) (19)	Wisconsin (4–0–0) (19)	Wisconsin (6–0–0) (19)	Wisconsin (8–0–0) (19)	Wisconsin (10–0–0) (19)	Wisconsin (12–0–0) (19)	Wisconsin (12–0–0) (19)	Ohio State (11–1–0) (18)	Ohio State (13–1–0) (18)	Ohio State (14–2–0) (13)	Ohio State (16–2–0) (18)	Ohio State (16–2–0) (19)	Ohio State (18–2–0) (19)	Ohio State (20–2–0) (19)	Ohio State (22–2–0) (19)	Ohio State (24–2–0) (19)	Ohio State (26–2–0) (19)	Ohio State (28–2–0) (19)	Ohio State (29–3–0) (18)	Ohio State (31–3–0) (18)	Wisconsin (33–5–0) (11)	Ohio State (33–4–0) (11)	1.
2.	Ohio State (1)	Ohio State (0–0–0)	Ohio State (1–1–0)	Ohio State (1–1–0)	Ohio State (3–1–0)	Ohio State (5–1–0)	Ohio State (7–1–0)	Ohio State (9–1–0)	Ohio State (9–1–0)	Colgate (13–1–0) (1)	Wisconsin (12–2–0)	Minnesota (13–2–0) (5)	Minnesota (14–3–1)	Minnesota (16–3–1)	Wisconsin (18–4–0)	Wisconsin (20–4–0)	Wisconsin (22–4–0)	Wisconsin (24–4–0)	Wisconsin (26–4–0)	Wisconsin (28–4–0)	Wisconsin (29–5–0) (1)	Wisconsin (31–5–0) (1)	Ohio State (32–4–0) (8)	Wisconsin (34–5–0) (8)	2.
3.	Minnesota	Minnesota (0–0–0)	Colgate (1–1–0)	Colgate (3–1–0)	Colgate (5–1–0)	Colgate (5–1–0)	Colgate (7–1–0)	Colgate (9–1–0)	Colgate (11–1–0)	Wisconsin (12–2–0)	Minnesota (11–2–0)	Wisconsin (13–3–0) (1)	Wisconsin (14–4–0)	Wisconsin (16–4–0)	Clarkson (21–1–2)	Clarkson (23–1–2)	Colgate (24–3–1)	Clarkson (25–3–2)	Clarkson (27–3–2)	Clarkson (29–3–2)	Clarkson (29–3–2)	Clarkson (31–3–2)	Colgate (31–6–1)	Colgate (32–6–1)	3.
4.	Colgate	Colgate (0–0–0)	Minnesota (0–0–0)	Minnesota (2–0–0)	Minnesota (4–0–0)	Minnesota (5–0–0)	Minnesota (5–2–0)	Minnesota (7–2–0)	Minnesota (7–2–0)	Minnesota (9–2–0)	Colgate (13–2–1)	Colgate (13–2–1)	Colgate (14–2–1)	Clarkson (19–1–2)	Minnesota (16–5–1)	Colgate (22–3–1)	Clarkson (24–2–2)	Colgate (24–5–1)	Colgate (26–5–1)	Minnesota (24–7–1)	Minnesota (25–7–2)	Colgate (29–6–1)	Clarkson (32–4–2)	Clarkson (33–4–2)	4.
5.	Northeastern	Northeastern (1–1–0)	Northeastern (3–1–0)	Yale (0–0–0)	Yale (0–0–0)	Quinnipiac (8–0–0)	Clarkson (9–0–1)	Clarkson (11–0–1)	Clarkson (13–0–1)	Clarkson (14–0–2)	Clarkson (16–0–2)	Clarkson (18–0–2)	Clarkson (18–0–2) (1)	Colgate (17–3–1)	Colgate (20–3–1)	Minnesota (18–5–1)	Minnesota (20–5–1)	Minnesota (22–5–1)	Minnesota (24–5–1)	Colgate (27–6–1)	Colgate (27–6–1)	Minnesota (27–8–2)	Minnesota (27–9–2)	Minnesota (27–10–2)	5.
6.	Yale	Yale (0–0–0)	Yale (0–0–0)	Minnesota Duluth (2–0–0)	Quinnipiac (6–0–0)	Yale (1–1–0)	Yale (3–1–0)	St. Lawrence (10–1–0)	Cornell (10–0–1)	St. Lawrence (12–3–0)	Minnesota Duluth (9–4–1)	Minnesota Duluth (10–5–1)	Minnesota Duluth (11–6–1)	Quinnipiac (19–3–1)	Quinnipiac (21–3–1)	Cornell (15–5–1)	Cornell (17–5–1)	St. Lawrence (21–9–0)	Cornell (20–6–1)	Cornell (22–6–1)	Cornell (22–6–1)	Cornell (24–6–1)	Cornell (24–7–1)	Cornell (25–8–1)	6.
7.	Minnesota Duluth	Minnesota Duluth (0–0–0)	Minnesota Duluth (0–0–0)	Northeastern (5–1–0)	Minnesota Duluth (2–2–0)	Minnesota Duluth (4–2–0)	Minnesota Duluth (6–2–0)	Minnesota Duluth (8–2–0)	St. Lawrence (10–3–0)	Minnesota Duluth (8–4–0)	Quinnipiac (14–3–0)	Quinnipiac (16–3–0)	St. Cloud State (13–6–1)	Minnesota Duluth (11–7–2)	Minnesota Duluth (13–7–2)	Minnesota Duluth (13–9–2)	Minnesota Duluth (13–11–2)	Cornell (18–6–1)	St. Lawrence (23–9–0)	St. Lawrence (25–9–0)	St. Lawrence (25–9–0)	St. Lawrence (27–9–0)	St. Lawrence (27–10–0)	St. Lawrence (28–11–0)	7.
8.	Quinnipiac	Quinnipiac (0–0–0)	Quinnipiac (2–0–0)	Quinnipiac (4–0–0)	Clarkson (5–0–1)	Clarkson (7–0–1)	Quinnipiac (8–2–0)	Cornell (8–0–1)	Minnesota Duluth (8–2–0)	Cornell (10–2–1)	Cornell (11–3–1)	St. Cloud State (11–4–0)	Quinnipiac (17–3–0)	St. Cloud State (13–6–1)	Cornell (13–5–1)	Quinnipiac (21–5–1)	St. Lawrence (19–9–0)	Minnesota Duluth (15–11–2)	Minnesota Duluth (17–11–2)	Minnesota Duluth (18–11–3)	Minnesota Duluth (18–12–4)	Minnesota Duluth (20–12–4)	Minnesota Duluth (20–13–4)	Minnesota Duluth (21–14–4)	8.
9.	Clarkson	Clarkson (2–0–0)	Clarkson (4–0–0)	Clarkson (5–0–1)	Cornell (2–0–0)	Cornell (4–0–1)	St. Lawrence (8–1–0)	Quinnipiac (10–2–0)	Quinnipiac (11–2–0)	Quinnipiac (12–3–0)	St. Lawrence (12–5–0)	Cornell (11–3–1)	Cornell (11–3–1)	Cornell (13–3–1)	St. Cloud State (14–7–1)	St. Cloud State (15–8–1)	Quinnipiac (21–7–1)	Quinnipiac (22–7–1)	Quinnipiac (22–9–1)	Quinnipiac (24–9–1)	Quinnipiac (25–9–1)	Quinnipiac (25–11–1)	Connecticut (25–7–5)	Connecticut (25–8–5)	9.
10.	Cornell	Penn State (1–1–0)	Cornell (0–0–0)	Cornell (0–0–0)	Northeastern (5–2–0)	St. Cloud State (7–2–0)	Cornell (6–0–1)	St. Cloud State (9–4–0)	St. Cloud State (9–4–0)	St. Cloud State (11–4–0)	St. Cloud State (11–4–0)	St. Lawrence (13–6–0)	St. Lawrence (13–6–0)	St. Lawrence (13–6–0)	St. Lawrence (15–8–0)	St. Lawrence (18–8–0)	St. Cloud State (15–10–1)	St. Cloud State (15–12–1)	St. Cloud State (15–14–1)	St. Cloud State (15–15–2)	St. Cloud State (17–15–2)	Connecticut (23–7–5)	Quinnipiac (25–11–1)	Quinnipiac (25–11–1)	10.
11.	Penn State	Cornell (0–0–0)	Penn State (1–2–1)	Penn State (1–4–1)	St. Lawrence (5–1–0)	St. Lawrence (6–1–0)	St. Cloud State (9–2–0)	Yale (3–3–0)	Yale (5–3–0)	Connecticut (9–3–1)	Connecticut (10–4–1)	Connecticut (11–4–2)	Connecticut (11–4–2)	Princeton (11–5–2)	Connecticut (14–6–2)	Connecticut (16–6–2)	Connecticut (17–6–3)	Connecticut (18–6–4)	Connecticut (19–6–5)	Connecticut (20–7–5)	Connecticut (22–7–5)	St. Cloud State (17–17–2)	St. Cloud State (17–17–2)	St. Cloud State (17–17–2)	11.
12.	Vermont	St. Cloud State (2–0–0)	Vermont (0–0–0)	Vermont (0–1–1)	Vermont (1–2–1)	Vermont (3–2–1)	Vermont (5–2–1)	Connecticut (5–3–1)	Connecticut (7–3–1)	Yale (5–5–0)	Princeton (7–4–1)	Princeton (8–4–2)	Princeton (9–5–2)	Connecticut (11–6–2)	Princeton (12–5–3)	Princeton (12–7–3)	Princeton (12–7–5)	Princeton (12–8–5)	Princeton (12–10–5)	Northeastern (23–9–2)	Princeton (14–10–6)	Princeton (14–12–6)	Princeton (14–12–6)	Penn State (22–13–3)	12.
13.	St. Cloud State	Vermont (0–0–0)	St. Cloud State (2–0–0)	St. Lawrence (4–0–0)	St. Cloud State (5–1–0)	Northeastern (6–3–0)	Northeastern (7–4–0)	Vermont (5–3–1)	Vermont (6–4–1)	Princeton (7–4–1)	Yale (6–6–0)	Yale (8–6–0)	Yale (9–7–0)	Boston College (11–7–2)	Boston College (12–7–3)	Boston College (13–7–4)	Northeastern (18–9–1)	Northeastern (20–9–1)	Northeastern (21–9–2)	Princeton (13–10–6)	Yale (16–13–1)	Northeastern (24–10–3)	Penn State (22–12–3)	Princeton (14–12–6)	13.
14.	Providence	Providence (0–0–0)	Connecticut (1–0–1)	Connecticut (1–0–1)	Princeton (2–0–0)	Princeton (3–1–0)	Boston College (5–4–1)	Princeton (4–3–1)	Princeton (6–3–1)	Boston College (8–6–1)	Vermont (7–6–1)	Boston College (9–7–2)	Boston College (9–7–2)	Yale (10–9–0)	Yale (10–9–0)	Northeastern (15–9–1)	Yale (11–11–1)	Penn State (18–11–1)	Boston College (14–9–7)	Yale (15–13–1)	Northeastern (23–10–3)	Penn State (22–12–3)	Northeastern (25–11–3)	Northeastern (25–11–3)	14.
15.	Princeton	Princeton (0–0–0)	Providence (0–0–0)	St. Cloud State (3–1–0)	Penn State (1–6–1)	Penn State (1–6–1)	Princeton (3–3–0)	Boston College (6–5–1)	Boston College (7–6–1)	Vermont (6–6–1)	Boston College (8–7–1)	Vermont (7–8–1)	Penn State (11–8–1)	Penn State (12–9–1)	Northeastern (13–9–1)	Yale (10–11–0)	Boston College (13–8–6)	Boston College (14–9–6)	Yale (14–12–1)	Penn State (19–12–3)	Penn State (21–12–3)	Yale (16–15–1)	Yale (16–15–1)	Yale (16–15–1)	15.
	Preseason Sep 19	Week 1 Sep 25	Week 2 Oct 3	Week 3 Oct 10	Week 4 Oct 17	Week 5 Oct 24	Week 6 Oct 31	Week 7 Nov 7	Week 8 Nov 14	Week 9 Nov 21	Week 10 Nov 28	Week 11 Dec 5	Week 12 Dec 12	Week 13 Jan 9	Week 14 Jan 16	Week 15 Jan 23	Week 16 Jan 30	Week 17 Feb 6	Week 18 Feb 13	Week 19 Feb 20	Week 20 Feb 27	Week 21 Mar 5	Week 22 Mar 12	Final Mar 19	
		None	Dropped: Princeton	Dropped: Providence	Dropped: Connecticut	None	Dropped: Penn State	Dropped: Northeastern	None	None	None	None	Dropped: Vermont	None	Dropped: Penn State	None	None	Dropped: Yale	Dropped: Penn State	Dropped: Boston College	None	None	None	None	
