= Kaitlyn O'Donohoe =

American ice hockey player (born 2001)

- Born: September 20, 2001 (age 25) Atlanta, Georgia, U.S.
- Height: 5 ft 8 in (173 cm)
- Position: Forward
- Shoots: Right
- PWHL team Former teams: Minnesota Frost; Brynäs IF
- Playing career: 2024–present

Kaitlyn O'Donohoe (born September 20, 2001) is an American professional ice hockey forward serving as a reserve player for the Minnesota Frost of the Professional Women's Hockey League (PWHL). She previously played for Brynäs IF in the Swedish Women's Hockey League (SDHL), and her college ice hockey career was played with the Colgate Raiders women's ice hockey program.

== Playing career ==
=== College ===
O'Donohoe played five seasons of college ice hockey with the Colgate Raiders in the ECAC Hockey conference of the NCAA Division I. She appeared in 179 games over five seasons, scoring 126 points (54G, 72A), seventh all-time for the Raiders. She played the second-most games all-time in Colgate history. With the Raiders, O'Donohoe won the ECAC Hockey regular season title in both 2021 and 2024, and the conference championship in 2021, 2022, 2023, and 2024.

=== Professional ===
Following college, O'Donohoe signed with Brynäs IF ahead of the 2024–25 SDHL season. Across fourteen games, she scored seven points on two goals and five assists.

She left Brynäs in November 2024 to attend the Minnesota Frost's training camp and ultimately signed with the team as a reserve player for the 2024–25 PWHL season. Following the injury of Frost forward Dominique Petrie, the team signed O'Donohoe to a standard player contract on December 28, 2024. Following pre-season training camp, she again signed as a reserve player for the Frost prior to the 2025–26 season.

== Personal life ==
O'Donohoe was born on September 20, 2001, in Atlanta, Georgia, United States. Both Downingtown, Pennsylvania and Myrtle Beach, South Carolina have been called her hometown.

She attended Choate Rosemary Hall for secondary school, where she played ice hockey, field hockey, and softball.

O'Donohoe majored in philosophy at Colgate University.

== Career statistics ==
Note: GP = Games played; G = Goals; A = Assists; Pts = Points; PIM = Penalty minutes;

			Regular season					Playoffs
Season	Team	League	GP	G	A	Pts	PIM	GP	G	A	Pts	PIM
2019–20	Colgate University	ECAC	38	8	5	13	4	—	—	—	—	—
2020–21	Colgate University	ECAC	23	7	5	12	0	—	—	—	—	—
2021–22	Colgate University	ECAC	39	11	18	29	16	—	—	—	—	—
2022–23	Colgate University	ECAC	39	19	25	44	6	—	—	—	—	—
2023–24	Colgate University	ECAC	40	9	19	28	4	—	—	—	—	—
2024–25	Brynäs IF	SDHL	14	2	5	7	8	—	—	—	—	—
2024–25	Minnesota Frost	PWHL	9	0	0	0	0	—	—	—	—	—
2025–26	Minnesota Frost	PWHL	9	1	0	1	0	—	—	—	—	—
SDHL totals			14	2	5	7	8	—	—	—	—	—
PWHL totals			18	1	0	1	0	—	—	—	—	—
