= Izzy Daniel =

American ice hockey player (born 2000)

- Born: September 29, 2000 (age 26) Minneapolis, Minnesota, U.S.
- Height: 5 ft 5 in (165 cm)
- Position: Forward
- Shoots: Right
- PWHL team Former teams: Vancouver Goldeneyes; Toronto Sceptres
- Playing career: 2019–present

Isabel Grace Daniel (born September 29, 2000) is an American professional ice hockey player who is a forward for the Vancouver Goldeneyes of the Professional Women's Hockey League (PWHL). She previously played for the Toronto Sceptres in the PWHL. She played college ice hockey at Cornell University and won the Patty Kazmaier Award in 2024.

== Early life ==
Daniel played four years of varsity hockey for The Blake School, winning two state championships and being named team MVP twice, all-conference three times, and all-state twice. She was a finalist for the Minnesota Ms. Hockey Award in 2019.

== Playing career ==
=== College ===
Beginning her collegiate career for Cornell University in the 2019–20 season, Daniel recorded three goals and 14 assists in 29 games. Following the season, she was named Ivy League Rookie of the Year. The Ivy League cancelled the 2020–21 season due to the COVID-19 pandemic. During the 2021–22 season, in her sophomore year, she recorded nine goals and 25 assists in 30 games and was named to the All-ECAC Hockey Third Team. During the 2022–23 season in her junior year, Daniel led the Big Red in scoring with 18 goals and 30 assists in 32 games, earning second team All-ECAC and second team All-Ivy honors.

During the 2023–24 season, in her senior year, Daniel again led Cornell in scoring, with 21 goals and 38 assists in 34 games. She ranked second in the nation in assists per game (1.12), third in points per game (1.74), and seventh in goals per game (0.62). Her 38 assists tied the Cornell single-season record. Following the season, she was named to the All-Ivy and All-ECAC first teams, and won Ivy League Player of the Year, ECAC Forward of the Year, and ECAC Player of the Year. She also won the 2024 Patty Kazmaier Award, becoming the first player from Cornell to win the award. She appeared in 125 consecutive games at Cornell and recorded 51 goals and 107 assists.

=== Professional ===
On June 10, 2024, Daniel was drafted in the third round, 18th overall, by PWHL Toronto in the 2024 PWHL Draft. On June 27, 2024, she signed a two-year contract with Toronto.

On June 9, 2025, Daniel was drafted eighth overall by the Vancouver Goldeneyes in the 2025 PWHL Expansion Draft.

== Personal life ==
Daniel is the daughter of Greg and Beth Daniel. She has two younger brothers, Eli and Darley. She studied industrial and labor relations at Cornell University.

== Career statistics ==
			Regular season					Playoffs
Season	Team	League	GP	G	A	Pts	PIM	GP	G	A	Pts	PIM
2019–20	Cornell University	ECAC	29	3	14	17	8	—	—	—	—	—
2021–22	Cornell University	ECAC	30	9	25	34	12	—	—	—	—	—
2022–23	Cornell University	ECAC	32	18	30	48	12	—	—	—	—	—
2023–24	Cornell University	ECAC	34	21	38	59	10	—	—	—	—	—
2024–25	Toronto Sceptres	PWHL	30	2	5	7	8	4	0	1	1	0
2025–26	Vancouver Goldeneyes	PWHL	28	7	3	10	12	—	—	—	—	—
PWHL totals			58	9	8	17	20	4	0	1	1	0

== Awards and honors ==
Honors	Year
College
Ivy League Rookie of the Year	2020
Third Team All-ECAC	2022
Second Team All-ECAC	2023
Second Team All-Ivy	2023
First Team All-ECAC	2024
First Team All-Ivy	2024
ECAC Player of the Year	2024
Ivy League Player of the Year	2024
Patty Kazmaier Award	2024
CCM/AHCA First Team All-American	2024

Awards and achievements
Preceded by Sophie Jaques	Patty Kazmaier Award; 2023–24	Succeeded by Casey O'Brien
