= 2023–24 NCAA Division I women's ice hockey season =

2023–24 NCAA women's ice hockey season
- NCAA tournament: 2024
- National championship: Whittemore Center; Durham, New Hampshire
- NCAA champion: Ohio State
- Patty Kazmaier Award: Izzy Daniel (Cornell)

The 2023–24 NCAA Division I women's ice hockey season began in September 2023 and ended with the 2024 NCAA National Collegiate women's ice hockey tournament's championship game at Whittemore Center in Durham, New Hampshire on March 24, 2024.

== Season headlines ==
- October 4, 2023 – The Division I Council approved changes to the transfer window for all sports. In winter sports other than basketball, including men's and women's ice hockey, the transfer portal now opens for a total of 45 days, starting 7 days after the NCAA tournament field is set.

== Regular season ==
=== Realignment ===
On December 17, 2021, it was announced Robert Morris would be reinstated for the 2023–24 season. On March 3, 2022, it was announced that College Hockey America (CHA) voted unanimously to reinstate the program back into the CHA.

On June 6, 2023, it was announced that CHA would merge with the Atlantic Hockey Association, with the two conferences operating under one banner by July 1, 2024. The two conferences had shared a commissioner and office staff since 2010. The merged conference was unveiled as Atlantic Hockey America on April 30, 2024.

=== Standings ===
- 2023–24 College Hockey America standings
  	Conference							Overall					
  	GP	W	L	T	PTS	GF	GA	GP	W	L	T	GF	GA
  #15 Penn State †	20	14	4	2	30	79	36	38	22	13	3	121	77
  Mercyhurst	20	14	6	0	28	75	39	28	20	17	1	112	89
  Robert Morris	20	11	8	1	23	60	69	35	15	19	1	94	126
  RIT	20	7	12	1	15	47	59	35	13	19	3	77	89
  Lindenwood	20	6	12	2	14	64	100	32	11	19	2	96	157
  Syracuse	19	4	13	2	10	46	65	34	7	24	3	67	138
  Championship: March 2, 2024 † indicates conference regular season champion; * indicates conference tournament champion Rankings: USCHO.com; updated March 24, 2024
- 2023–24 ECAC Hockey standings
  	Conference							Overall					
  	GP	W	L	T	PTS	GF	GA	GP	W	L	T	GF	GA
  #4 Colgate †	22	18	4	0	55	102	28	40	32	7	1	186	51
  #3 Clarkson	22	18	3	1	54.5	73	24	40	33	5	2	135	51
  #7 St. Lawrence	22	18	4	0	53	79	40	39	28	11	0	125	92
  #6 Cornell	22	17	5	0	48	81	40	34	25	8	1	125	64
  #9 Quinnipiac	22	13	9	0	41	72	54	37	25	11	1	134	74
  #14 Yale	22	12	9	1	35.5	55	44	32	17	14	1	88	63
  #12 Princeton	22	6	10	6	29	48	57	32	14	12	6	91	78
  Brown	22	7	12	3	26.5	41	57	32	12	17	3	61	78
  RPI	22	5	16	1	15.5	42	66	35	13	18	4	81	79
  Dartmouth	22	3	16	2	14.5	36	107	30	6	21	3	64	138
  Union	22	3	17	2	13	28	73	35	8	25	2	57	110
  Harvard	22	3	18	1	10.5	27	94	30	5	23	2	38	118
  Championship: March 9, 2024 † indicates conference regular season champion; * indicates conference tournament champion Rankings: USCHO.com; updated March 24, 2024
- 2023–24 NEWHA standings
  	Conference							Overall					
  	GP	W	L	T	PTS	GF	GA	GP	W	L	T	GF	GA
  LIU †	28	26	2	0	52	84	29	37	28	9	0	96	66
  Saint Anselm	28	18	9	1	37	94	54	37	20	16	1	114	87
  Stonehill	28	17	9	2	36	83	55	38	21	15	2	100	94
  Sacred Heart	28	14	12	2	30	58	50	38	15	21	2	70	96
  Franklin Pierce	28	14	13	1	29	67	51	35	18	16	1	85	72
  Assumption	28	10	14	4	24	59	66	36	10	22	4	69	99
  Post	28	7	20	1	15	33	82	37	8	28	1	41	122
  Saint Michael's	28	0	27	1	1	30	121	36	0	35	1	36	158
  Championship: March 9, 2024 † indicates conference regular season champion; * indicates conference tournament champion Rankings: USCHO.com; updated March 24, 2024
- 2023–24 Western Collegiate Hockey Association standings
  	Conference										Overall					
  	GP	W	L	T	OTW	OTL	SOW	PTS	GF	GA	GP	W	L	T	GF	GA
  #1 Ohio State †	28	26	2	0	2	0	0	78	140	37	39	35	4	0	201	51
  #2 Wisconsin *	28	23	5	0	2	1	0	69	124	43	41	35	6	0	205	62
  #5 Minnesota	28	19	7	1	1	2	2	62	92	60	39	27	10	2	135	80
  #7 Minnesota Duluth	28	15	11	2	0	0	0	47	64	47	39	21	14	4	89	66
  #10 St. Cloud State	28	12	14	2	0	1	0	40	60	59	34	17	17	2	78	69
  Minnesota State	28	6	22	0	1	2	0	19	52	94	38	13	25	0	97	120
  St. Thomas	28	4	23	1	0	0	1	11	39	120	37	10	26	1	74	150
  Bemidji State	28	3	24	1	0	0	0	10	33	144	36	4	30	2	42	181
  Championship: March 9, 2024 † indicates conference regular season champion; * indicates conference tournament champion Rankings: USCHO.com; updated March 24, 2023
- 2023–24 WHEA standings
  	Conference										Overall					
  	GP	W	L	T	OTW	OTL	SOW	PTS	GF	GA	GP	W	L	T	GF	GA
  #11 UConn †	27	19	4	4	2	1	1	61	70	28	38	25	8	5	91	47
  #13 Northeastern	27	16	8	3	4	2	2	51	67	40	39	25	11	3	94	50
  New Hampshire	27	14	11	2	0	4	2	50	63	64	36	18	16	2	85	87
  #15 Boston College	27	13	9	5	2	1	3	46	75	64	36	15	14	7	95	97
  Providence	27	12	10	5	1	2	2	44	64	59	35	13	17	5	72	84
  Vermont	27	11	12	4	2	2	2	39	61	70	35	13	17	5	79	94
  Boston University	27	12	13	1	2	1	0	36	65	65	35	14	18	3	87	91
  Maine	27	11	14	2	3	1	0	33	64	65	35	15	18	2	94	89
  Merrimack	27	7	17	3	2	4	1	27	48	76	36	11	22	3	62	104
  Holy Cross	27	4	20	3	2	2	3	18	39	84	35	8	24	3	65	103
  Championship: March 9, 2024 † indicates conference regular season champion; * indicates conference tournament champion Rankings: USCHO.com; updated March 24, 2024

== Player stats ==
=== Scoring leaders ===
The following players lead the NCAA in points at the conclusion of games played on March 16, 2024.

Note: GP = Games played; G = Goals; A = Assists; Pts = Points; PIM = Penalty minutes;

Player	Class	Team	GP	G	A	Pts
|Kirsten Simms	Sophomore	Wisconsin	37	32	42	74
Casey O'Brien	Senior	Wisconsin	39	23	48	71
Abbey Murphy	Junior	Minnesota	39	33	29	62
Danielle Serdachny	Graduate	Colgate	39	22	39	61
Britta Curl	Graduate Student	Wisconsin	39	22	39	61
Izzy Daniel	Graduate Student	Cornell	34	21	38	59
Lacey Eden	Senior	Wisconsin	39	27	29	56
Kristýna Kaltounková	Senior	Colgate	35	26	30	56
Abby Hustler	Junior	St. Lawrence	39	24	31	55
Laila Edwards	Sophomore	Wisconsin	39	20	34	54

=== Leading goaltenders ===
The following goaltenders lead the NCAA in goals against average at the conclusion of games played on March 16, 2024.

Note: Pos = Position;GP = Games played; Min, TOI = Minutes played; W = Wins; L = Losses; T,T/OT = Ties; OTL = Overtime losses; GA = Goals-against; GAA = Goals-against average; SO = Shutouts; SA = Shots against; SV = Shots saved; SV% = Save percentage;

Player	Class	Team	GP	Min	W	L	T	GA	SO	SV%	GAA
Megan Warrener	Junior	Connecticut	14	834	12	1	1	14	4	0.951	1.01
Raygan Kirk	Graduate Student	Ohio State	24	883	22	2	0	25	10	0.945	1.05
Gwyneth Philips	Graduate Student	Northeastern	37	1,865	23	11	3	44	6	0.955	1.17
Hailey MacLeod	Sophomore	Minnesota Duluth	15	898	10	4	1	17	5	0.958	1.14
Michelle Pasiechnyk	Senior	Clarkson	25	1,459	20	3	1	31	7	0.942	1.28

== Awards ==
=== WCHA ===
==== Individual Awards ====
WCHA Individual Awards
Award	Recipient
Player of the Year	Kirsten Simms
Defensive Player of the Year	Caroline Harvey
Rookie of the Year	Joy Dunne
Outstanding Student-Athlete of the Year	Clara Van Wieren
Scoring Champion	Kirsten Simms
Goaltending Champion	Sanni Ahola
Coach of the Year	Nadine Muzerall

==== All-WCHA teams ====
All-WCHA Conference Teams
Team	Position	Player	Collegiate Team
First Team	F	Hannah Bilka	Ohio State
First Team	F	Casey O'Brien	Wisconsin
First Team	F	Kirsten Simms	Wisconsin
First Team	D	Cayla Barnes	Ohio State
First Team	D	Caroline Harvey	Wisconsin
First Team	G	Sanni Ahola	St. Cloud State
Second Team	F	Britta Curl	Wisconsin
Second Team	F	Lacey Eden	Wisconsin
Second Team	F	Abbey Murphy	Minnesota
Second Team	D	Hadley Hartmetz	Ohio State
Second Team	D	Nelli Laitinen	Minnesota
Second Team	G	Hailey MacLeod	Minnesota Duluth
Third Team	F	Jenn Gardiner	Ohio State
Third Team	F	Emma Gentry	St. Cloud State
Third Team	F	Joy Dunne	Ohio State
Third Team	F	Laila Edwards	Wisconsin
Third Team	D	Nina Jobst-Smith	Minnesota Duluth
Third Team	D	Madeline Wethington	Minnesota
Third Team	G	Raygan Kirk	Ohio State
Rookie Team	F	Joy Dunne	Ohio State
Rookie Team	F	Cassie Hall	Wisconsin
Rookie Team	F	Jocelyn Amos	Ohio State
Rookie Team	D	Laney Potter	Wisconsin
Rookie Team	D	Ava Murphy	Wisconsin
Rookie Team	G	Ève Gascon	Minnesota Duluth

=== CHA ===
==== Individual Awards ====
CHA Individual Awards
Award	Recipient
Player of the Year	Tessa Janecke
Rookie of the Year	Alaina Giampietro
Forward of the Year	Tessa Janecke
Defenseman of the Year	Sydney Pedersen
Defensive Forward of the Year	Kylee Mahoney
Scoring Champion	Ena Nystrøm
Scoring Champion	Tessa Janecke
Sportsmanship Award	Vanessa Upson
Scoring Champion	Tatum White
Coach of the Year	Jeff Kampersal

==== All-CHA teams ====
All-CHA Conference Teams
Team	Position	Player	Collegiate Team
First Team	F	Tessa Janecke	Penn State
First Team	F	Morgan Neitzke	Lindenwood
First Team	F	Sara Boucher	Mercyhurst
First Team	D	Sydney Pedersen	Mercyhurst
First Team	D	Rachel Teslak	Syracuse
First Team	G	Ena Nystrøm	Mercyhurst
Second Team	F	Brianna Brooks	Penn State
Second Team	F	Alaina Giampietro	Robert Morris
Second Team	F	Vanessa Upson	Mercyhurst
Second Team	D	Maggie MacEachern	Penn State
Second Team	D	Sarah Davies	Lindenwood
Second Team	G	Sophia Bellina	RIT
Rookie Team	F	Alaina Giampietro	Robert Morris
Rookie Team	F	Sofia Nuutinen	Mercyhurst
Rookie Team	F	Addie Alvarez	RIT
Rookie Team	D	Sofia Ljung	Mercyhurst
Rookie Team	D	Emma Pickering	RIT
Rookie Team	G	Maggie Hatch	Robert Morris

=== NEWHA ===
==== Individual awards ====
NEWHA Individual Awards
Award	Recipient
Player of the Year	Natalie Tulchinsky
Rookie of the Year	Isabella Chaput
Defenseman of the Year	Bri Eid
Goalie of the Year	Tindra Holm
Coach of the Year	Kelly Nash

==== All-NEWHA teams ====
All-NEWHA Conference Teams
Team	Position	Player	Collegiate Team
First Team	F	Alexis Petford	Stonehill
First Team	F	Natalie Tulchinsky	St. Anselm
First Team	F	Jeannie Wallner	LIU
First Team	D	Bri Eid	LIU
First Team	D	Maggie Korneta	Franklin Pierce
First Team	G	Tindra Holm	LIU
Second Team	F	Audrey Jackson	Saint Anselm
Second Team	F	Mikayla Kelley	Franklin Pierce
Second Team	F	Mikayla Lantto	LIU
Second Team	D	Brinna Martin	St. Anselm
Second Team	D	Savannah Popick	St. Anselm
Second Team	G	Jillian Petruno	Sacred Heart
Rookie Team	F	Grace Babington	LIU
Rookie Team	F	Jenna Chaplain	Assumption
Rookie Team	F	Isabella Chaput	Sacred Heart
Rookie Team	F	Alexa Hanrahan	Assumption
Rookie Team	F	Lauren Maras	Franklin Pierce
Rookie Team	D	Pusle Dyring-Andersen	Stonehill
Rookie Team	G	Courtney Stagman	St. Anselm
All-Sportswomen Team	F	Mary Leys	Saint Michael's
All-Sportswomen Team	F	Kayla McGaffigan	Assumption
All-Sportswomen Team	F	Samantha Ostrowski	Sacred Heart
All-Sportswomen Team	F	Sarah Rourke	LIU
All-Sportswomen Team	D	Delaney Bonifacio	Assumption
All-Sportswomen Team	D	Savannah Popick	St. Anselm
All-Sportswomen Team	D	Hannah Squires	Stonehill
All-Sportswomen Team	G	Grace Glasrud	Post

=== WHEA ===
==== Individual awards ====
Hockey East Individual Awards
Award	Recipient
Cammi Granato Award (Player of the Year)	Natálie Mlýnková
Pro Ambitions Rookie of the Year	Sammy Taber
Hockey East Coach of the Year	Chris Mackenzie
Best Defensive Forward	Kathryn Stockdale
Best Defenseman	Megan Carter
Sportmanship Award	Annie Berry
Army ROTC Three Stars Award	Gwyneth Philips
Scoring Champion	Ida Kuoppala; Natálie Mlýnková

==== All-WHEA teams ====
All-Hockey East Conference Teams
Team	Position	Player	Collegiate Team
First Team	F	Jada Habisch	UConn
First Team	F	Ida Kuoppala	Maine
First Team	F	Natálie Mlýnková	Vermont
First Team	D	Megan Carter	Northeastern
First Team	D	Camryn Wong	UConn
First Team	G	Gwyneth Philips	Northeastern
Second Team	F	Peyton Anderson	Northeastern
Second Team	F	Lacey Martin	Boston University
Second Team	F	Sammy Taber	Boston College
Second Team	D	Jules Constantinople	Northeastern
Second Team	D	Krista Parkkonen	Vermont
Second Team	G	Tia Chan	UConn
Third Team	F	Skylar Irving	Northeastern
Third Team	F	Kira Juodikis	New Hampshire
Third Team	F	Katy Knoll	Northeastern
Third Team	D	Rae Bretton	New Hampshire
Third Team	D	Brooke Becker	Providence
Third Team	G	Sedona Blair	New Hampshire
Rookie Team	F	Ashley Allard	UConn
Rookie Team	F	Audrey Knapp	Providence
Rookie Team	F	Allie Lalonde	Northeastern
Rookie Team	F	Kaylee Lewis	Vermont
Rookie Team	F	Julia Pellerin	Boston College
Rookie Team	F	Sammy Taber	Boston College
Rookie Team	D	Molly Jordan	Boston College
Rookie Team	G	Sedona Blair	New Hampshire

=== ECAC ===
==== Individual awards ====
Award	Recipient
Player of the Year	Izzy Daniel
Best Forward	Izzy Daniel
Best Defenseman	Nicole Gosling
Rookie of the Year	Emma Pais
Goaltender of the Year	Michelle Pasiechnyk
Mandi Schwartz Student-Athlete of the Year	Elle Hartje
Coach of the Year	Matt Desrosiers

==== All-ECAC teams ====
All-ECAC Conference Teams
Team	Position	Player	Collegiate Team
First Team	F	Izzy Daniel	Cornell
First Team	F	Danielle Serdachny	Colgate
First Team	F	Sarah Fillier	Princeton
First Team	D	Nicole Gosling	Clarkson
First Team	D	Mae Batherson	St. Lawrence
First Team	G	Michelle Pasiechnyk	Clarkson
Second Team	F	Julia Gosling	St. Lawrence
Second Team	F	Abby Hustler	St. Lawrence
Second Team	F	Elle Hartje	Yale
Second Team	D	Haley Winn	Clarkson
Second Team	D	Sydney Morrow	Colgate
Second Team	G	Emma-Sofie Nordstrøm	St. Lawrence
Third Team	F	Elyssa Biederman	Colgate
Third Team	F	Anna Segedi	St. Lawrence
Third Team	F	Dominique Petrie	Clarkson
Third Team	D	Kendall Cooper	Quinnipiac
Third Team	D	Kate Reilly	Quinnipiac
Third Team	G	Hannah Murphy	Colgate
Rookie Team	F	Emma Pais	Colgate
Rookie Team	F	Kahlen Lamarche	Quinnipiac
Rookie Team	F	Karel Prefontaine	Cornell
Rookie Team	D	Andrea Trnková	RPI
Rookie Team	D	Keira Hurry	Clarkson
Rookie Team	G	Annelies Bergmann	Cornell

=== Individual Awards ===
==== Table key ====
Key of colors and symbols
Color/symbol	Explanation
†	Winner

==== Patty Kazmaier Award ====
Patty Kazmaier Award Finalists
Player	Position	School
Izzy Daniel†	Forward	Cornell
Casey O'Brien	Forward	Wisconsin Top Three
Kirsten Simms	Forward	Wisconsin Top Three
Sarah Fillier	Forward	Princeton
Caroline Harvey	Defense	Wisconsin
Abby Hustler	Forward	St. Lawrence
Tessa Janecke	Forward	Penn State
Abbey Murphy	Forward	Minnesota
Gwyneth Philips	Goaltender	Northeastern
Danielle Serdachny	Forward	Colgate

==== AHCA Coach of the Year ====
AHCA Coach of the Year Finalists
Coach	School
Chris MacKenzie†	UConn
Matt Desrosiers	Clarkson
Greg Fargo	Colgate
Mark Johnson	Wisconsin
Jeff Kampersal	Penn State
Nadine Muzerall	Ohio State
Kelly Nash	LIU

==== Goalie of the Year ====
Goalie of the Year Finalists
Player	School
Michelle Pasiechnyk†	Clarkson
Raygan Kirk	Ohio State
Gwyneth Philips	Northeastern

==== Julie Chu Rookie of the Year Award ====
Julie Chu Rookie of the Year Award Finalists
Player	Position	School
Joy Dunne†	Forward	Ohio State
Emma Pais	Forward	Colgate Runner Up
Isabel Chaput	Forward	Sacred Heart
Alaina Giampietro	Forward	Robert Morris
Sammy Taber	Forward	Boston College
