= Peyton Anderson =

American ice hockey player (born 2001)

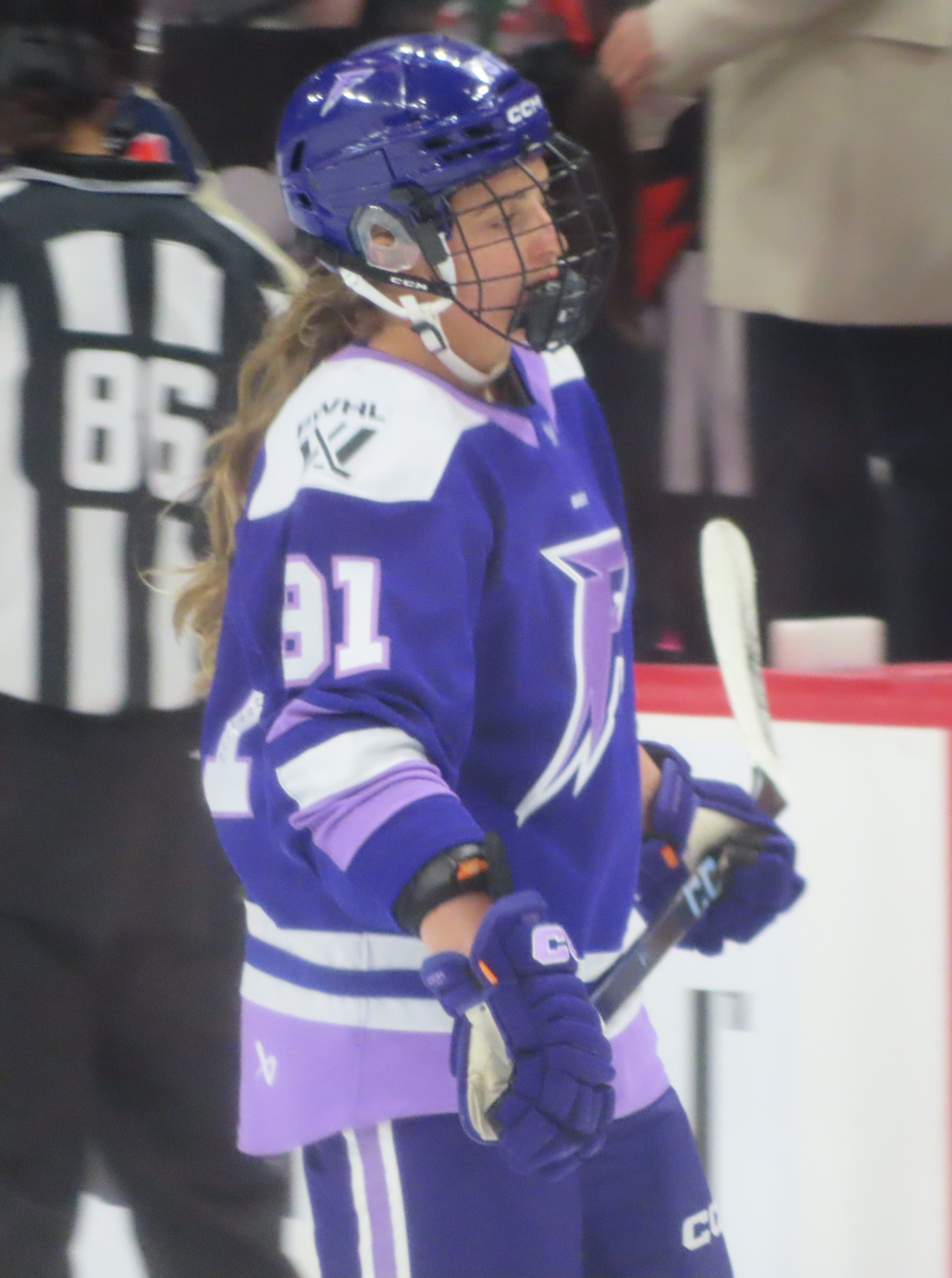
- Born: April 18, 2001 (age 25) Arvada, Colorado, US
- Height: 5 ft 5 in (165 cm)
- Position: Forward
- Shoots: Left
- PWHL team: Minnesota Frost
- Playing career: 2025–present

Peyton Anderson (born April 18, 2001) is an American professional ice hockey player who is a forward for the Minnesota Frost of the Professional Women's Hockey League (PWHL). She played her college ice hockey at Northeastern University.

== Early life ==
Anderson started playing hockey in the third grade. She quickly set her goals on Division I hockey, and credits her success to her older sisters, parents, and coaches. She attended Ralston Valley High School and played for three years with Team Colorado. She attended USA Hockey National Team Development Camp in 2016 and 2017, and was invited to USA Hockey U-18 Select Camp in 2018.

She is one of five sisters. She studied business administration at Northeastern.

== Playing career ==
=== College ===
Anderson began her college playing career in 2019. She was the Pro Ambitions Rookie of the Week on November 18, 2019. She was the top scorer for Northeastern during the 2022–23 season. Anderson was credited with being a great influence on team culture. Her younger sister Avery joined her on the Northeastern team.

Anderson scored 81 points (39 goals, 42 assists) in 175 games over five years at Northeastern. She was recognized twice as on Hockey East All-Tournament Team in 2023 and 2024. She was also a Hockey East Second Team All-Star and New England Division I All Star in 2023–24.

=== Professional ===
Anderson was invited to the Minnesota Frost training camp for the 2025–26 season as an undrafted player. She was named to the team roster on November 20, 2025. During her rookie year she recorded one goal and one assist in 28 regular season games. On June 20, 2026, she signed a one-year contract extension with the Frost.

== Career statistics ==
			Regular season					Playoffs
Season	Team	League	GP	G	A	Pts	PIM	GP	G	A	Pts	PIM
2019–20	Northeastern University	Hockey East	38	8	10	18	18	—	—	—	—	—
2020–21	Northeastern University	Hockey East	24	3	3	6	8	—	—	—	—	—
2021–22	Northeastern University	Hockey East	36	2	7	9	14	—	—	—	—	—
2022–23	Northeastern University	Hockey East	38	11	9	20	12	—	—	—	—	—
2023–24	Northeastern University	Hockey East	39	15	13	28	18	—	—	—	—	—
2025–26	Minnesota Frost	PWHL	28	1	1	2	12	5	0	0	0	0
PWHL totals			28	1	1	2	12	5	0	0	0	0
