= Klára Hymlárová =

Czech ice hockey player (born 1999)

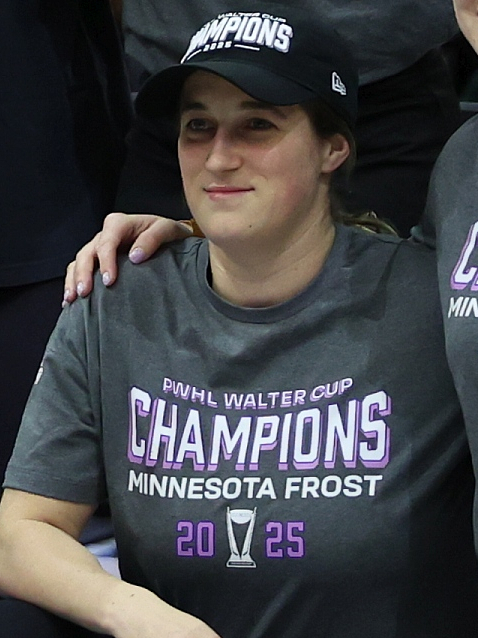
- Hymlárová in 2025
- Born: 27 February 1999 (age 27) Opava, Czech Republic
- Height: 1.65 m (5 ft 5 in)
- Weight: 65 kg (143 lb; 10 st 3 lb)
- Position: Forward
- Shoots: Left
- PWHL team Former teams: Minnesota Frost; SK Karviná; HC Slezan Opava
- National team: Czech Republic
- Playing career: 2011–present
Medal record
World Championship
Bronze medal – third place	2022 Denmark
Bronze medal – third place	2023 Canada

Klára Hymlárová (born 27 February 1999) is a Czech ice hockey player for the Minnesota Frost of the Professional Women's Hockey League (PWHL) and a member of the Czech Republic women's national ice hockey team. She played college ice hockey at St. Cloud State. She was drafted 15th overall by Minnesota in the 2024 PWHL draft.

== Playing career ==
On 10 June 2024, Hymlárová was drafted in the third round, 15th overall, by PWHL Minnesota in the 2024 PWHL draft. She signed a two-year contract with the team on 21 June 2024. During the 2024–25 season, she recorded one goal and one assist in 29 regular season games and one goal and four assists in eight games during the 2025 PWHL playoffs, helping the Frost win the Walter Cup. During the 2025–26 season, she recorded three goals and five assists in 29 regular season games and two assists in five games during the 2026 Walter Cup playoffs. On 20 June 2026, she signed a one-year contract extension with the Frost.

== International play ==
As a junior player with the Czech national under-18 team, she participated in the IIHF Women's U18 World Championships in 2015, 2016, and served as team captain for the 2017 tournament.

She represented the Czech Republic at the IIHF Women's World Championship Top Division tournaments in 2016, 2017, 2019, 2021, 2022, 2023, and 2024 and at the 2015 IIHF Women's World Championship Division I Group A tournament. At the qualification for the women's ice hockey tournament at the 2022 Winter Olympics, she was the Czech Republic's second leading scorer, tallying three goals and three assists in three games, as the team qualified to participate in the Olympic Games for the first time in history.

== Career statistics ==
Note: GP = Games played; G = Goals; A = Assists; Pts = Points; PIM = Penalty minutes;

			Regular season					Playoffs
Season	Team	League	GP	G	A	Pts	PIM	GP	G	A	Pts	PIM
2019–20	St. Cloud State University	WCHA	35	8	18	26	14	—	—	—	—	—
2020–21	St. Cloud State University	WCHA	19	1	6	7	4	—	—	—	—	—
2021–22	St. Cloud State University	WCHA	15	2	4	6	12	—	—	—	—	—
2022–23	St. Cloud State University	WCHA	37	17	9	26	15	—	—	—	—	—
2023–24	St. Cloud State University	WCHA	36	8	16	24	12	—	—	—	—	—
2024–25	Minnesota Frost	PWHL	29	1	1	2	4	8	1	4	5	0
2025–26	Minnesota Frost	PWHL	29	3	5	8	6	5	0	2	2	2
PWHL totals			58	4	6	10	10	13	1	6	7	2

== Awards and honors ==
Honors	Year
PWHL
Walter Cup Champion	2025
