= Maddie Rooney =

American ice hockey player (born 1997)

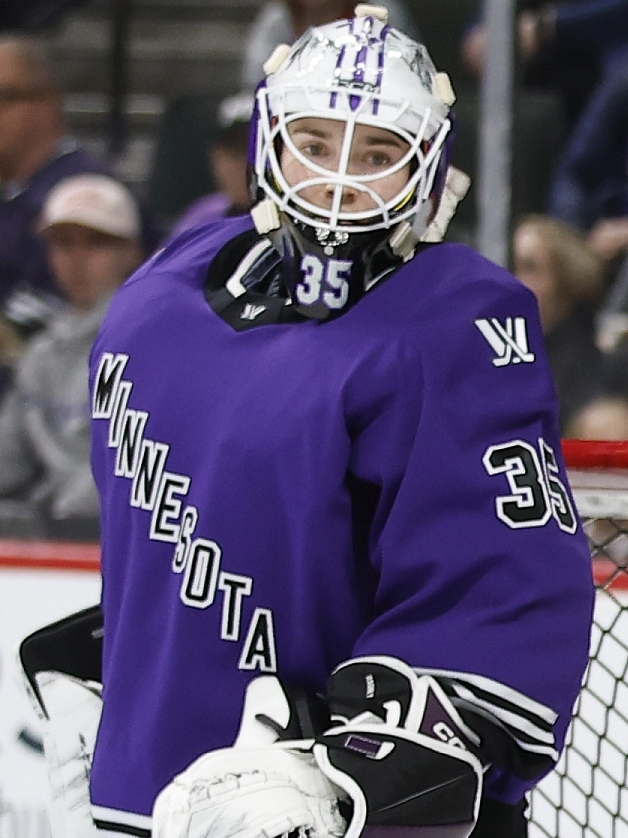
- Rooney with PWHL Minnesota in 2024
- Born: July 7, 1997 (age 29) Duluth, Minnesota, U.S.
- Height: 5 ft 5 in (165 cm)
- Weight: 146 lb (66 kg; 10 st 6 lb)
- Position: Goaltender
- Catches: Left
- PWHL team Former teams: Minnesota Frost; PWHPA; Minnesota Duluth Bulldogs
- National team: United States
- Playing career: 2015–present
Medal record
Olympic Games
Gold medal – first place	2018 Pyeongchang	Team
Silver medal – second place	2022 Beijing	Team
World Championships
Gold medal – first place	2017 United States
Gold medal – first place	2019 Finland
Silver medal – second place	2022 Denmark

Madeline S. Rooney (born July 7, 1997) is an American professional ice hockey player who is a goaltender for the Minnesota Frost of the Professional Women's Hockey League (PWHL). She was the starting goaltender for the United States women's national ice hockey team when they won the gold medal at the 2018 Winter Olympics.

== Early life and education ==
Rooney was born on July 7, 1997, in Duluth, Minnesota. She attended Andover High School. In her senior year of high school, Rooney switched from the girls to the boys varsity team and finished the season with a .910 save percentage.

Rooney has a degree in business marketing from the University of Minnesota Duluth.

== Playing career ==
=== College ===
Rooney played for the Minnesota Duluth Bulldogs women's ice hockey program in the Western Collegiate Hockey Association (WCHA) conference as part of the NCAA Division I ice hockey league. In her second year, she compiled a save percentage of .942 and a goals against average of 1.65, good for fourth-best and tenth-best in the NCAA, respectively. She was awarded the 2018 Bob Allen Women's Player of the Year Award.

=== PWHPA ===
After graduating, Rooney joined the PWHPA for the 2020–21 season. She played two seasons with the PWHPA.

=== PWHL ===
Rooney signed a two-year contract with PWHL Minnesota as a free agent after going undrafted in the 2023 PWHL Draft. Rooney was a member of the inaugural Minnesota PWHL team, which won the Walter Cup. Rooney and Nicole Hensley both played goalie for Minnesota, generally alternating games.

On June 17, 2025, she signed a three-year contract extension with the Frost.

=== International play ===
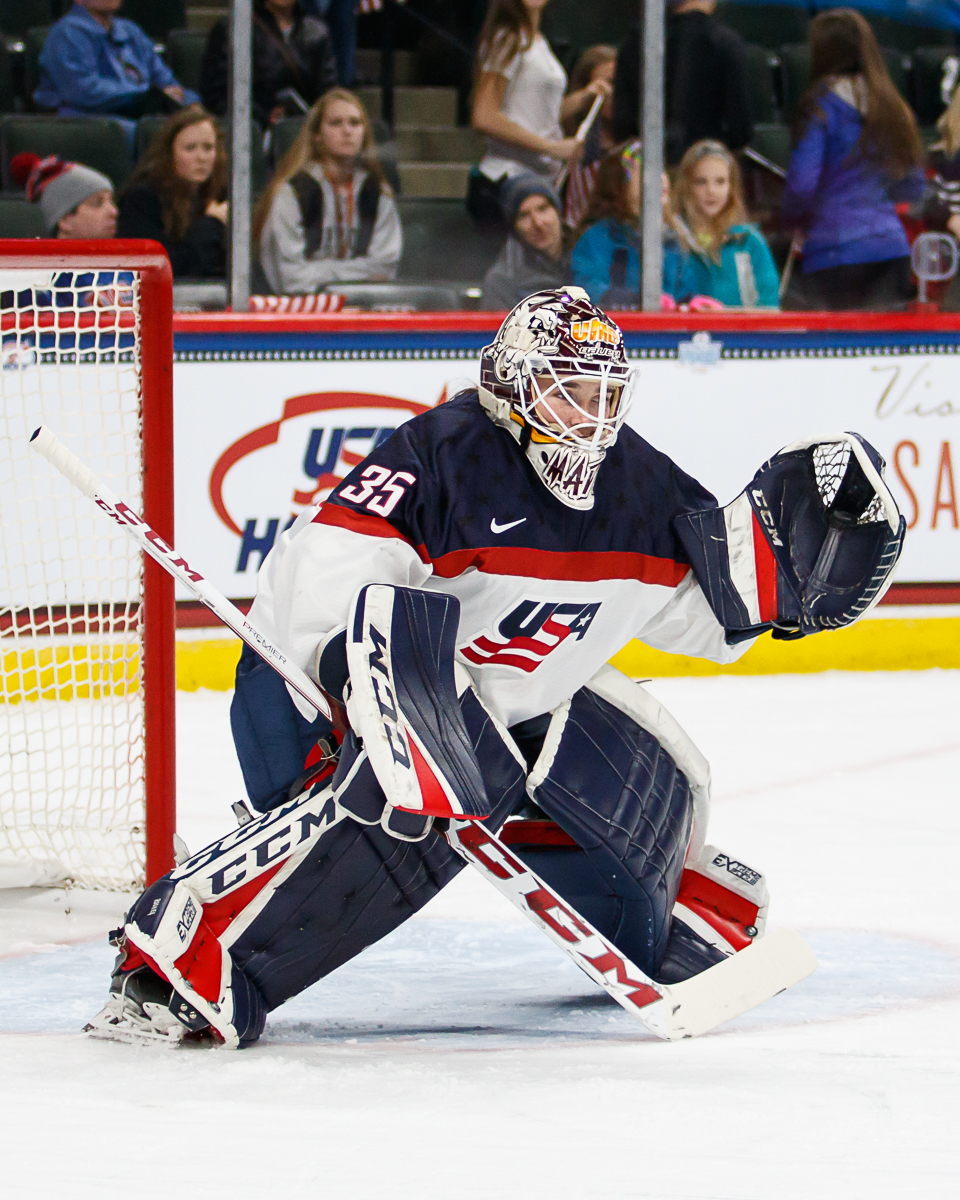
Rooney playing for the United States during the 2017 IIHF Women's World Championship

At the age of 19, Rooney won a gold medal at the 2017 IIHF Women's World Championship as a backup goaltender. She recorded a shutout in her only game of the tournament, which came against Russia in the preliminary round. In 2018, she was again selected to play for the U.S. women's national ice hockey team at the Winter Olympics in Pyeongchang. Rooney started all but one of the games in the competition, losing only one game to Canada during the round robin. She helped lead Team USA to the gold medal by winning the shootout in the final against Canada by a score of 3–2, stopping Meghan Agosta in the sixth and last round to end the game. It was the United States' first gold medal at the Olympics since 1998, ending the Canadians' streak of four consecutive Olympic championships.

On January 2, 2022, Rooney was named to Team USA's roster to represent the United States at the 2022 Winter Olympics.

== Career statistics ==
=== Regular season and playoffs ===
Note: GP = Games played; Min, TOI = Minutes played; W = Wins; L = Losses; T,T/OT = Ties; OTL = Overtime losses; GA = Goals-against; GAA = Goals-against average; SO = Shutouts; SV% = Save percentage;

			Regular season									Playoffs
Season	Team	League	GP	W	L	T/OT	MIN	GA	SO	GAA	SV%	GP	W	L	MIN	GA	SO	GAA	SV%
2015–16	Minnesota Duluth Bulldogs	WCHA	19	5	12	0	1019	54	2	3.18	.899	—	—	—	—	—	—	—	—
2016–17	Minnesota Duluth Bulldogs	WCHA	37	25	7	5	1019	62	6	1.65	.942	—	—	—	—	—	—	—	—
2018–19	Minnesota Duluth Bulldogs	WCHA	31	12	15	4	1866	87	1	2.80	.919	—	—	—	—	—	—	—	—
2019–20	Minnesota Duluth Bulldogs	WCHA	35	17	12	6	2152	73	4	2.03	.930	—	—	—	—	—	—	—	—
2020–21	Team Minnesota	PWHPA	3	2	1	0	180	8	0	2.67	.899	—	—	—	—	—	—	—	—
2022–23	Team Adidas	PWHPA	9	5	0	0	540	23	1	2.56	.911	—	—	—	—	—	—	—	—
2023–24	PWHL Minnesota	PWHL	10	5	3	2	605	21	2	2.08	.915	5	3	2	322	6	2	1.12	.948
2024–25	Minnesota Frost	PWHL	19	8	7	3	1129	39	2	2.07	.907	5	5	0	376	11	0	1.75	.932
NCAA totals			122	59	46	15	7289	276	13	2.27	.926	—	—	—	—	—	—	—	—
PWHPA totals			12	7	1	0	720	31	1	2.58	.908	—	—	—	—	—	—	—	—
PWHL totals			29	13	10	5	1734	60	4	2.07	.910	10	8	2	698	17	2	1.70	.939

=== International ===
Note: GP = Games played; Min, TOI = Minutes played; W = Wins; L = Losses; T,T/OT = Ties; OTL = Overtime losses; GA = Goals-against; GAA = Goals-against average; SO = Shutouts; SV% = Save percentage;

				Regular season
Year	Team	Event	Result	GP	W	L	T/OT	MIN	GA	SO	GAA	SV%
2017	United States	WC	1st place, gold medalist(s)	1	1	0	0	60:00	0	1	0.00	1.000
2018	United States	OG	1st place, gold medalist(s)	4	2	1	0	258:56	5	1	1.16	.946
2019	United States	WC	1st place, gold medalist(s)	2	2	0	0	120:00	0	2	0.00	1.000
2022	United States	OG	2nd place, silver medalist(s)	2	1	1	0	117:23	6	0	3.07	.846
2022	United States	WC	2nd place, silver medalist(s)	2	2	0	0	120:00	2	1	1.00	.950
Senior totals				11	8	2	0	676:19	13	5	1.180	–

Source.

== Awards and honors ==
Honors	Year	Ref
PWHL
Walter Cup Champion	2024, 2025	
