= Brooke Becker =

American ice hockey player (born 2002)

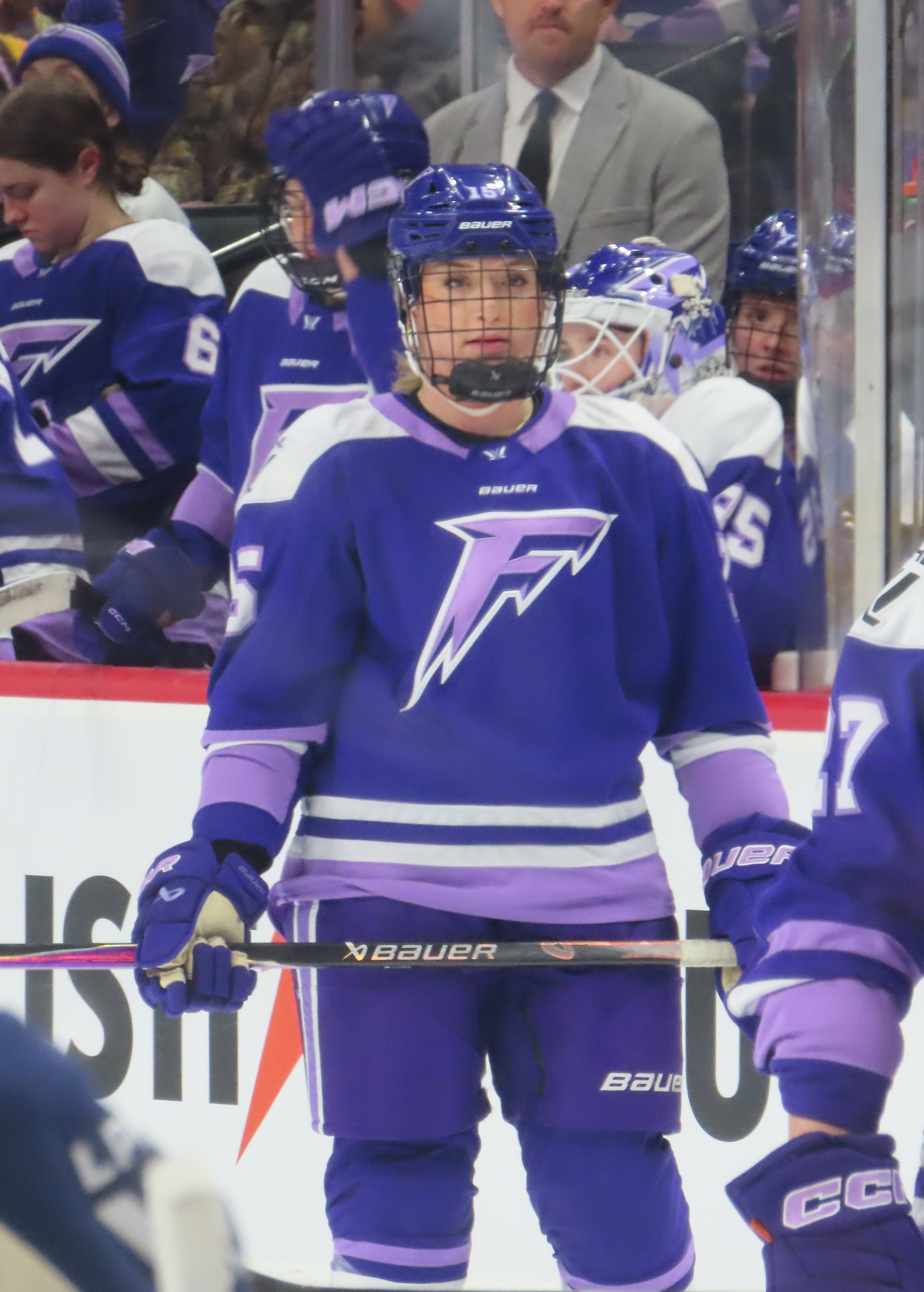
- Brooke Becker
- Born: May 30, 2002 (age 24) Orchard Park, New York, U.S.
- Height: 5 ft 8 in (173 cm)
- Position: Defense
- Shoots: Right
- PWHL team: Minnesota Frost
- Playing career: 2025–present

Brooke Becker (born May 30, 2002) is an American professional ice hockey player who is a defender for the Minnesota Frost of the Professional Women's Hockey League (PWHL). She played college ice hockey for the Providence Friars.

== Early life ==
Becker grew up in Orchard Park, New York, and played for the Buffalo Bisons and the Stoney Creek Jr. Sabres (PWHL) before enrolling at Providence. At Orchard Park High School she was a three-time player of the year and helped win a state championship in 2017–18.

== Playing career ==
=== College ===
Becker appeared in a program-record 163 games for Providence from 2020–21 through 2024–25, serving as an alternate captain in her graduate season. As a freshman, she led Friar defensemen with 14 points and was named to the Hockey East Pro Ambitions All-Rookie Team; she also earned Rookie of the Month (March 2021) and Rookie of the Week honors.

In 2022–23, she posted 16 points (3–13–16) in 37 games and was Hockey East Defensive Player of the Week on Feb. 27, 2023.

In 2023–24, she had 16 points (5–11–16) in 35 games, was named Hockey East Player of the Week on Jan. 15, 2024, and earned All-Hockey East Third Team honors.

As a graduate student in 2024–25, Becker recorded 18 points (5–13–18) in 35 games, was an Army ROTC Defender of the Week on Jan. 6, and was named a Hockey East Second-Team All-Star and a New England Hockey Writers All-Star. In July 2025, Providence nominated her for NCAA Woman of the Year.

=== Professional ===
On June 24, 2025, Becker was selected in the sixth round, 46th overall, by the Minnesota Frost in the 2025 PWHL Draft. Following training camp, she signed a one-year contract with the Frost prior to the 2025–26 season. During her rookie year she recorded one assist in 27 regular season games. On June 20, 2026, she signed a one-year contract extension with the Frost.

== Personal life ==
Becker graduated summa cum laude from Providence in 2024 (management, finance minor) and completed an MBA in 2025. Her father, Patrick, played for the Providence men’s hockey team (1988–1990).

== Career statistics ==
Note: GP = Games played; G = Goals; A = Assists; Pts = Points; PIM = Penalty minutes;

			Regular season					Playoffs
Season	Team	League	GP	G	A	Pts	PIM	GP	G	A	Pts	PIM
2020–21	Providence College	HEA	21	3	11	14	22	—	—	—	—	—
2021–22	Providence College	HEA	35	2	10	12	18	—	—	—	—	—
2022–23	Providence College	HEA	37	3	13	16	14	—	—	—	—	—
2023–24	Providence College	HEA	35	5	11	16	43	—	—	—	—	—
2024–25	Providence College	HEA	35	5	13	18	28	—	—	—	—	—
2025–26	Minnesota Frost	PWHL	27	0	1	1	14	5	0	0	0	0
PWHL totals			27	0	1	1	14	5	0	0	0	0

== Awards and honors ==
Honor	Year	Ref
College
Hockey East Pro Ambitions All-Rookie Team	2021	
All-Hockey East Third Team	2023–24	
Hockey East Second-Team All-Star	2024–25	
New England Hockey Writers All-Star	2024–25	
