= Abby Hustler =

Canadian ice hockey player (born 2003)

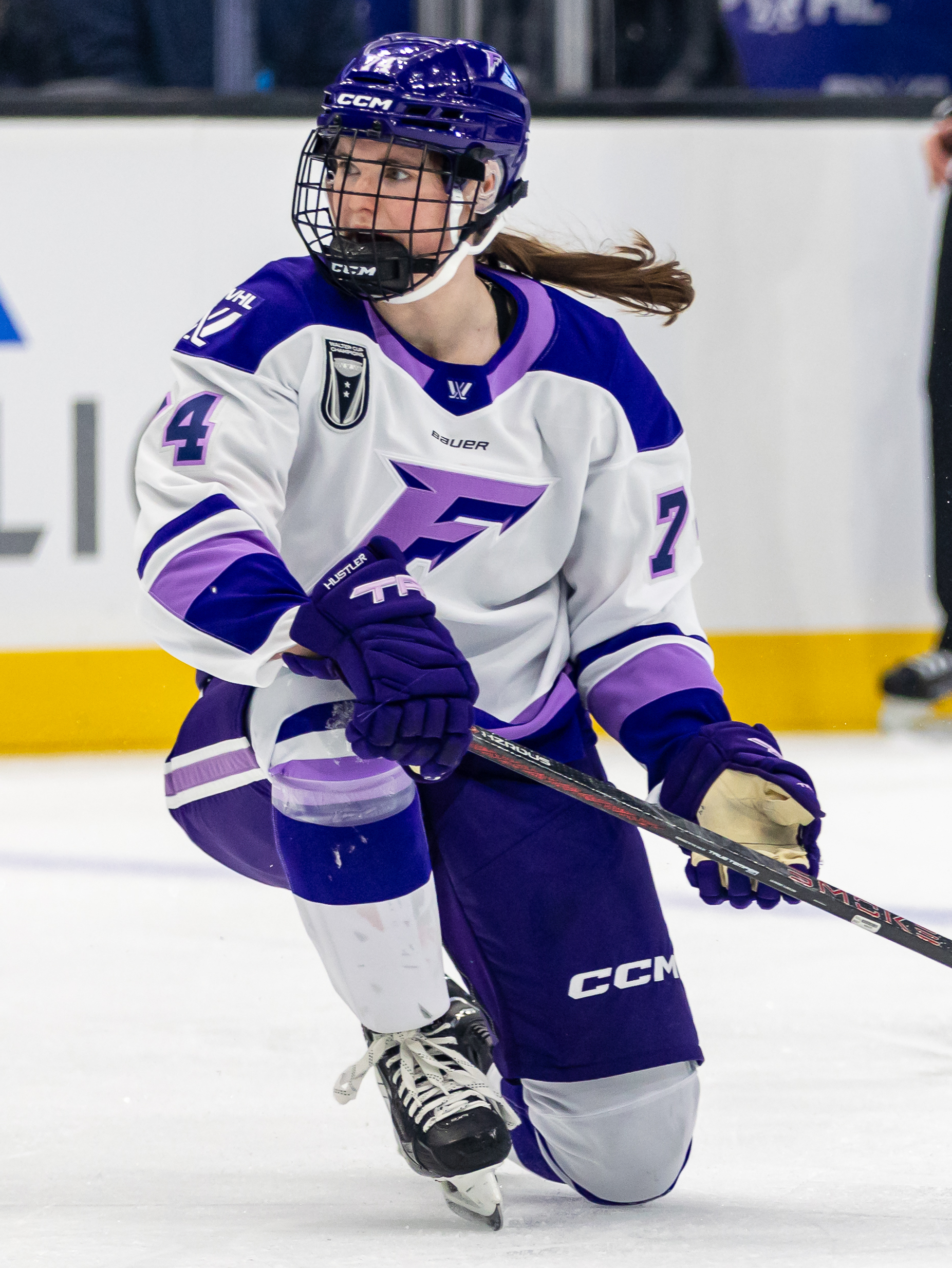
- Hustler with the Minnesota Frost in 2025
- Born: May 13, 2003 (age 23) St. Louis, Prince Edward Island, Canada
- Height: 5 ft 9 in (175 cm)
- Position: Forward
- Shoots: Left
- PWHL team Former teams: Hamilton Havoc; Minnesota Frost
- Playing career: 2025–present

Abby Hustler (born May 13, 2003) is a Canadian professional ice hockey player who is a forward for the Hamilton Havoc of the Professional Women's Hockey League (PWHL). She previously played for the Minnesota Frost of the PWHL. She played college ice hockey at St. Lawrence University.

== Early life ==
Hustler grew up in St. Louis, Prince Edward Island. She is the daughter of Paul and April Hustler.

== Playing career ==
=== College ===
Hustler played four years of college ice hockey at St. Lawrence University. She was an alternate captain in her final two seasons with the team. In January 2024, she earned Top HCA Monthly Honors with 19 points in 9 games, leading the nation in points and her team to a six-game winning streak. Her play in the second half of her junior year earned her a Top-10 finish for the Patty Kazmaier Award, and she finished the season with 55 points in 39 games. She earned Second-Team All-ECAC Hockey honors as a senior. In her NCAA career, Hustler scored 158 points (71 goals, 87 assists) in 154 games.

=== Professional ===
Hustler was drafted in the second round, fourteenth overall, by the Minnesota Frost in the 2025 PWHL Draft. She was the first player from Prince Edward Island drafted into the PWHL. On July 17, 2025, she signed a two-year contract with the Frost. During the 2025–26 season, in her rookie year, she recorded four goals and nine assists in 30 regular season games, and one assist in five games during the 2026 Walter Cup playoffs.

During the league's expansion to 12 teams ahead of the 2026–27 season, she signed a two-year contract with the Hamilton Havoc on June 14, 2026.

== Career statistics ==
Note: GP = Games played; G = Goals; A = Assists; Pts = Points; PIM = Penalty minutes;

			Regular season					Playoffs
Season	Team	League	GP	G	A	Pts	PIM	GP	G	A	Pts	PIM
2021–22	St. Lawrence Saints	ECAC	37	12	16	28	18	—	—	—	—	—
2022–23	St. Lawrence Saints	ECAC	39	16	20	36	10	—	—	—	—	—
2023–24	St. Lawrence Saints	ECAC	39	24	31	55	24	—	—	—	—	—
2024–25	St. Lawrence Saints	ECAC	39	19	20	39	14	—	—	—	—	—
2025–26	Minnesota Frost	PWHL	30	4	9	13	10	5	0	1	1	6
PWHL totals			30	4	9	13	10	5	0	1	1	6

== Awards and honours ==
Honours	Year
College
Al-ECAC Second Team	2025
