= Nicole Hensley =

American ice hockey player (born 1994)

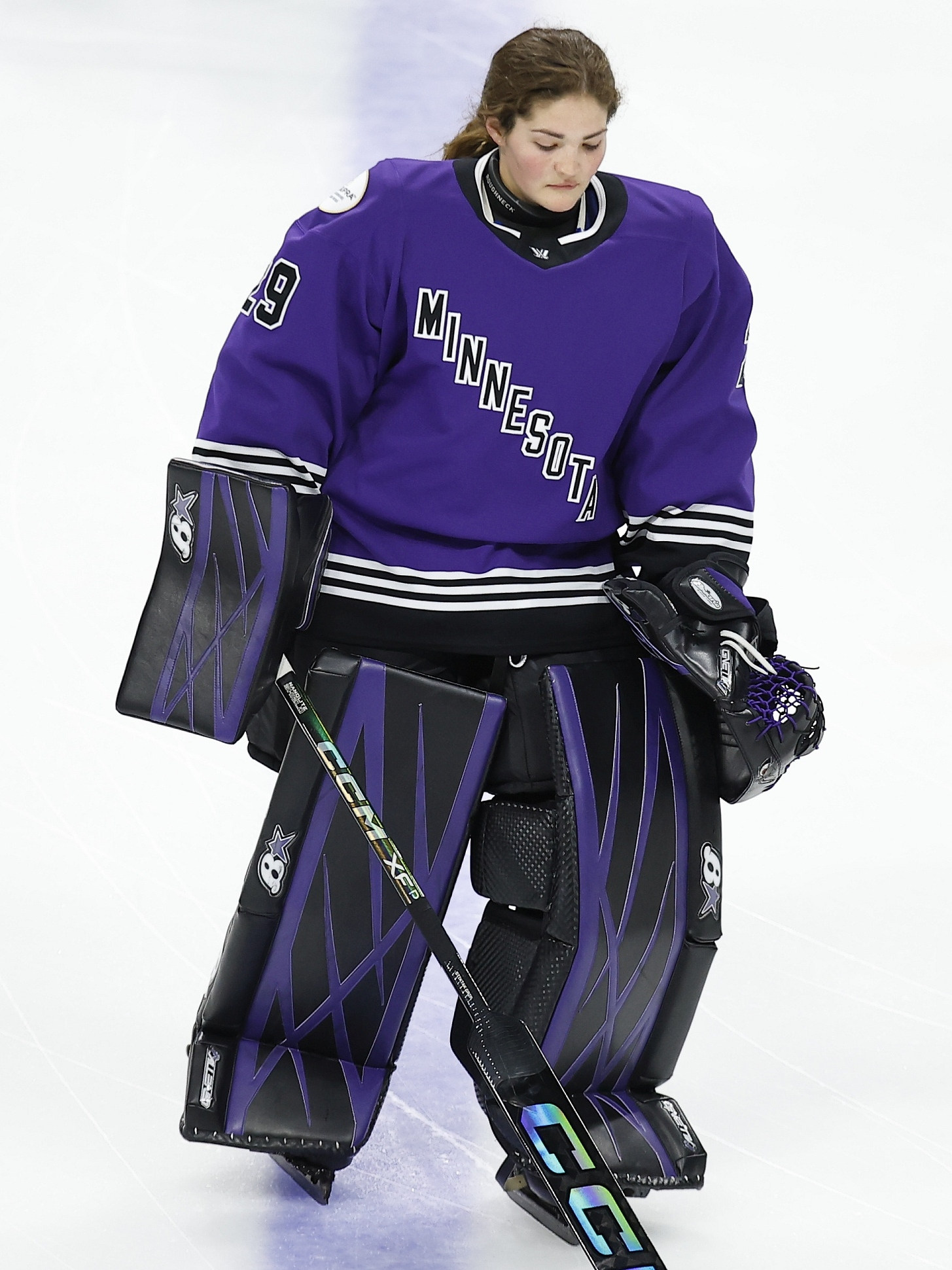
- Hensley with PWHL Minnesota in 2024
- Born: June 23, 1994 (age 32) Littleton, Colorado, U.S.
- Height: 5 ft 7 in (170 cm)
- Weight: 165 lb (75 kg; 11 st 11 lb)
- Position: Goaltender
- Catches: Left
- PWHL team Former teams: Vegas Vanguards; Lindenwood Lady Lions; Minnesota Frost
- National team: United States
- Playing career: 2012–present
Medal record
Olympic Games
Gold medal – first place	2018 Pyeongchang	Team
Silver medal – second place	2022 Beijing	Team
World Championships
Gold medal – first place	2016 Canada
Gold medal – first place	2017 United States
Gold medal – first place	2023 Canada
Silver medal – second place	2021 Canada
Silver medal – second place	2022 Denmark
Silver medal – second place	2024 United States

Nicole Hensley (born June 23, 1994) is an American professional ice hockey goaltender for the Vegas Vanguards of the Professional Women's Hockey League (PWHL) and a member of the United States women's national ice hockey team. She previously played for the Minnesota Frost of the PWHL.

== Playing career ==
=== Lindenwood University ===
Hensley debuted with the Lindenwood Lady Lions ice hockey team during the 2012-13 Lindenwood Lady Lions ice hockey season. Hensley won four consecutive CHA Student-Athlete of the Year awards, and landed on the CHA all-Academic team each year.

=== NWHL ===
On June 12, 2018, Hensley signed a contract with the Buffalo Beauts of the National Women's Hockey League (NWHL). In her debut for the Beauts, Hensley earned a shutout win over Finnish Olympian Meeri Räisänen of the Connecticut Whale in a 4–0 final on October 7, 2018. In the 2019 NWHL All-Star Weekend, Hensley won the Chipwich Fastest Goalie competition.

=== PWHPA ===
Hensley was scheduled to be one of three goaltenders to play in the PWHPA Dream Gap tour stop in Tokyo, Japan, along with Kimberley Sass and Alex Cavalinni.

=== PWHL ===
On September 18, 2023, Hensley was selected in the 2nd round, 12th overall by PWHL Minnesota in the 2023 PWHL Draft, the first goaltender selected. Playing in a tandem with Maddie Rooney, she delivered two shutouts in the playoffs and the team won the first-ever Walter Cup to conclude the 2023–24 season.

In 2025, Hensley had the opportunity to play in front of her hometown crowd as part of the PWHL Takeover Tour. She noted it was the first women's game at Denver's Ball Arena since 2001. She delivered a 24-save shutout with one game to go in the season to put the Frost within one point of the fourth-place charge, giving the Frost the opportunity to make the playoffs. She played in three playoff games for the 2024–25 season and the team became back-to-back Walter Cup champions.

During the 2025–26 season, she appeared in 13 games and posted a 7–4–2 record, with a 2.69 goals against average (GAA) and .908 save percentage. She had a 30-save shutout against the Seattle Torrent in an attendance record breaking game at Climate Pledge Arena in November.

During the league's expansion to 12 teams ahead of the 2026–27 season, she was left unprotected by the Frost and signed a two-year contract with the Vegas Vanguards on June 10, 2026.

== International play ==
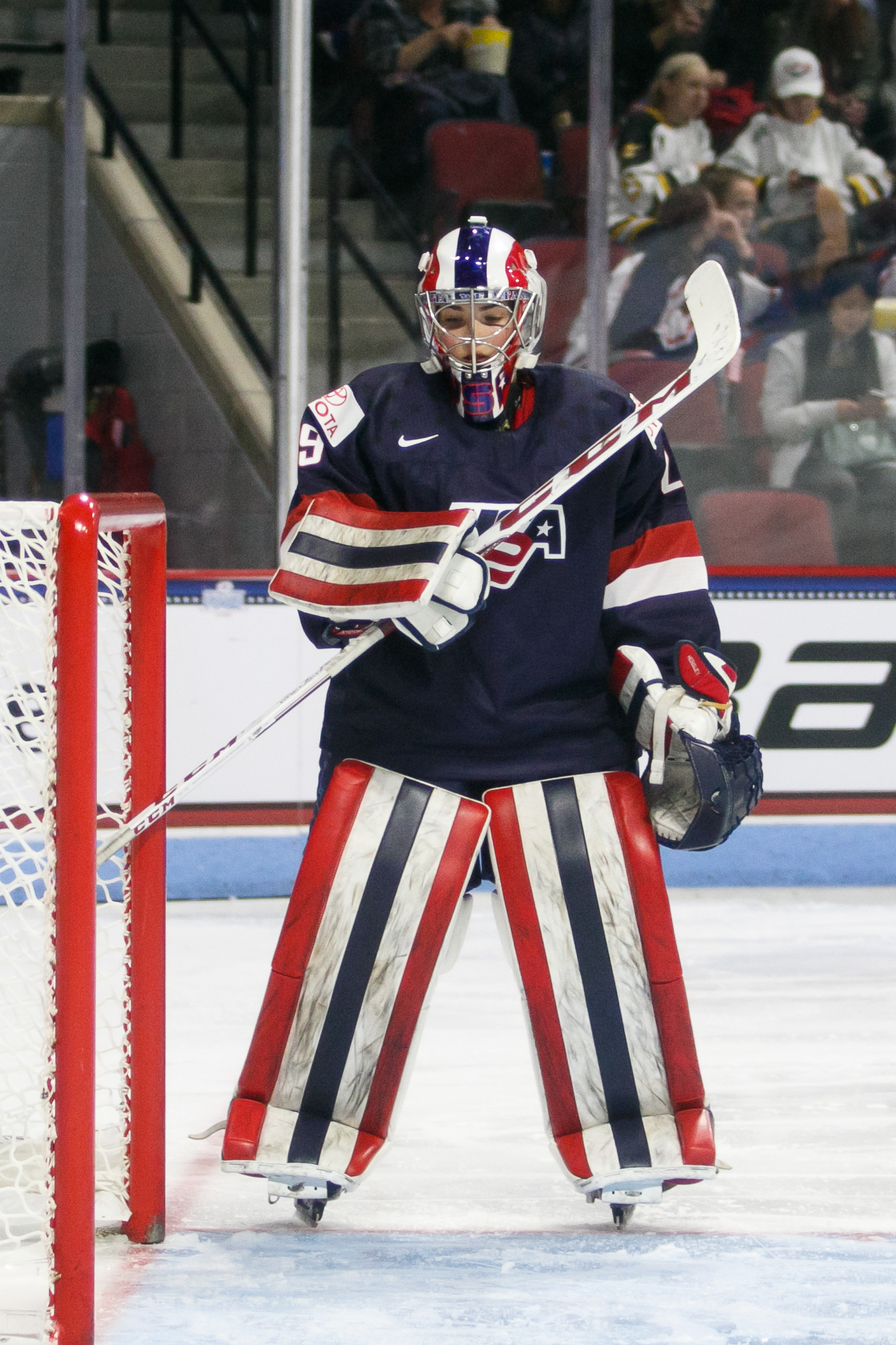
Hensley with Team USA in 2017

Hensley was named one of three goaltenders to compete for the United States women's national ice hockey team at the 2016 IIHF Women's World Championship in Kamloops, British Columbia. Hensley was also named to the 2017 team, where she was in net for a shutout against Canada in the preliminary rounds, started the quarterfinal against Germany, and played in Team USA's 3–2 OT win against Canada for the championship.

She made the 2018 Olympic team, where the United States won the gold medal, earning a shutout win over the Russian team in her only appearance.

Hensley was one of the goaltenders named to Team USA's rosters for the second half of the rivalry series between Team USA and Team Canada in 2019–2020.

On January 2, 2022, Hensley was named to Team USA's roster to represent the United States at the 2022 Winter Olympics.

== Career statistics ==
=== Regular season and playoffs ===
Note: GP = Games played; Min, TOI = Minutes played; W = Wins; L = Losses; T,T/OT = Ties; OTL = Overtime losses; GA = Goals-against; GAA = Goals-against average; SO = Shutouts; SV% = Save percentage;

			Regular season									Playoffs
Season	Team	League	GP	W	L	T/OT	MIN	GA	SO	GAA	SV%	GP	W	L	MIN	GA	SO	GAA	SV%
2012–13	Lindenwood Lady Lions	CHA	27	7	16	3	1597	91	0	3.42	.922	—	—	—	—	—	—	—	—
2013–14	Lindenwood Lady Lions	CHA	33	5	25	3	1864	103	0	3.31	.921	—	—	—	—	—	—	—	—
2014–15	Lindenwood Lady Lions	CHA	30	10	17	2	1750	79	2	2.71	.916	—	—	—	—	—	—	—	—
2015–16	Lindenwood Lady Lions	CHA	32	8	20	4	1904	80	2	2.52	.922	—	—	—	—	—	—	—	—
2018–19	Buffalo Beauts	NWHL	6	5	1	0	360	9	2	1.50	.935	1	0	1	60	2	0	1.97	.935
2019–20	Team Minnesota	PWHPA	—	—	—	—	—	—	—	—	—	—	—	—	—	—	—	—	—
2020–21	PWHPA Minnesota	PWHPA	3	3	0	0	180	4	0	1.33	.956	—	—	—	—	—	—	—	—
2022–23	Team Sonnet	PWHPA	13	4	0	0	771	33	1	2.57	.921	—	—	—	—	—	—	—	—
2023–24	PWHL Minnesota	PWHL	14	7	6	1	849	31	1	2.19	.919	5	3	2	338	6	2	1.06	.945
2024–25	Minnesota Frost	PWHL	11	7	3	1	639	27	1	2.53	.900	3	1	2	197	8	0	2.43	.906
2025–26	Minnesota Frost	PWHL	13	7	4	2	781	35	1	2.69	.908	—	—	—	—	—	—	—	—
NWHL totals			6	5	1	0	360	9	2	1.50	.935	1	0	1	60	2	0	1.97	.935
PWHPA totals			13	4	0	0	771	33	1	2.57	.921	—	—	—	—	—	—	—	—
PWHL totals			38	21	13	4	2269	93	3	2.46	.910	8	4	4	535	14	2	1.57	.928

=== International ===
Note: GP = Games played; Min, TOI = Minutes played; W = Wins; L = Losses; T,T/OT = Ties; OTL = Overtime losses; GA = Goals-against; GAA = Goals-against average; SO = Shutouts; SV% = Save percentage;

				Regular season
Year	Team	Event	Result	GP	W	L	T/OT	MIN	GA	SO	GAA	SV%
2018	USA	OG	1st place, gold medalist(s)	1	1	0	0	60:00	0	1	0.00	1.000
2022	USA	OG	2nd place, silver medalist(s)	1	1	0	0	60:00	0	1	0.00	1.000

== Awards and honors ==
- 2014–15 All-CHA First Team
- 2024 Walter Cup Champion
- 2025 Walter Cup Champion
- 2025 PWHL Intact Impact Award (honors one player from each team who best displayed leadership, integrity and commitment)
