= Dominique Petrie =

American ice hockey player (born 2001)

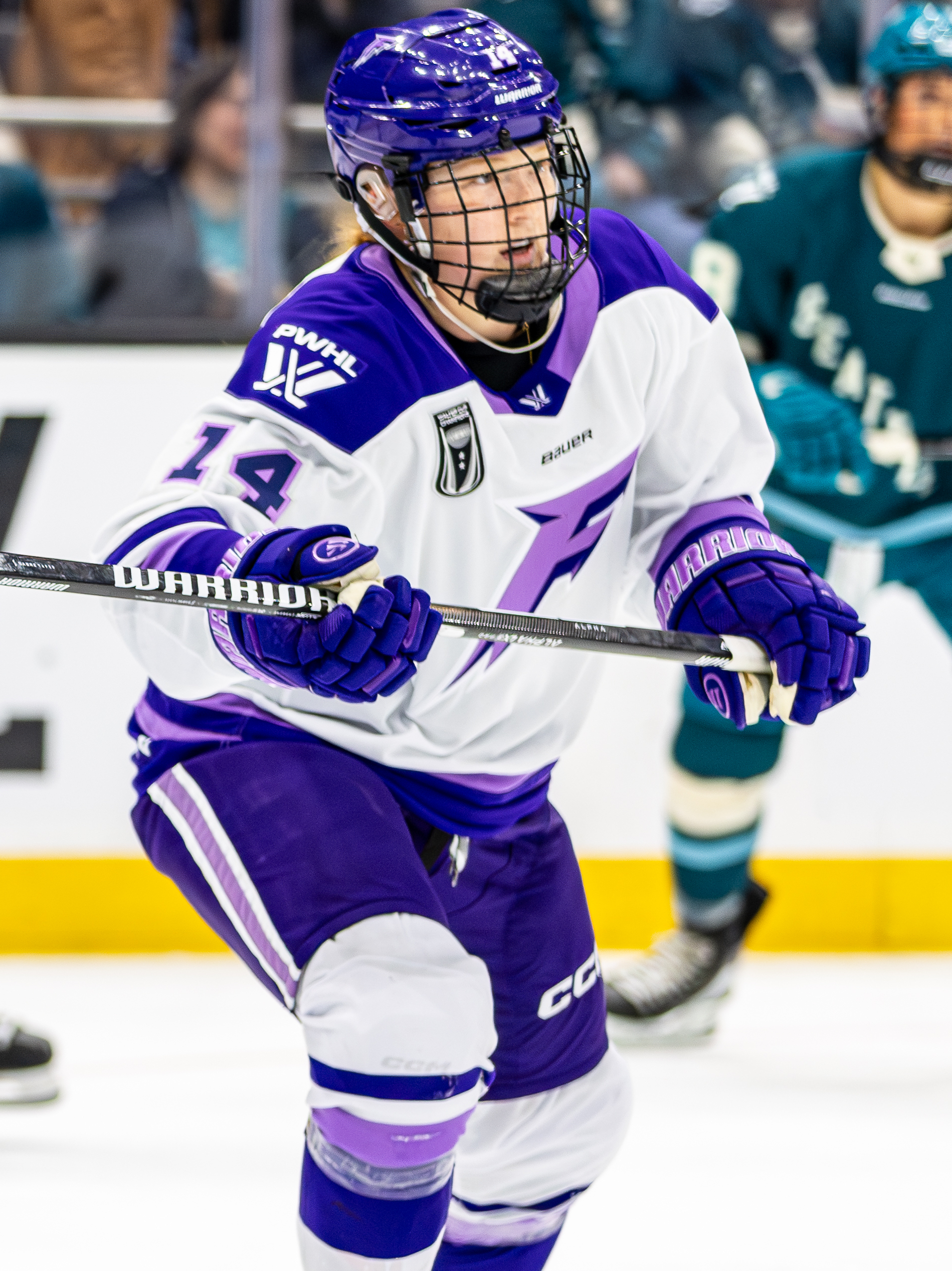
- Petrie with the Minnesota Frost in 2025
- Born: January 21, 2001 (age 25) Hermosa Beach, California, U.S.
- Height: 5 ft 7 in (170 cm)
- Position: Forward
- PWHL team: Minnesota Frost
- Playing career: 2024–present

Dominique Petrie (born January 21, 2001) is an American professional ice hockey player who is a forward for the Minnesota Frost of the Professional Women's Hockey League (PWHL). She played college ice hockey at Harvard and Clarkson.

== Early life ==
Petrie is the daughter of David and Jo Anne Petrie. Her brother, Guy, also played collegiate hockey at the University of Utah, and inspired her to play hockey. She played with boys throughout her youth career and was coached by Craig Johnson when she played with the L.A. Junior Kings. She also played for the Anaheim Jr. Ducks and the San Diego Jr. Gulls. Johnson was struck by Petrie's willingness to take on anything, including fights on the ice.

== Playing career ==
=== College ===
Petrie chose Harvard for her college career. She was the team's best-performing forward her sophomore season, averaging 1.25 points per game. She was also the president of the Student Athlete Advisory Committee and was named to the 2020 academic honor role. Her 2020–21 season was canceled due to COVID-19. Petrie graduated from Harvard in 2022 with a degree in economics and a minor in psychology. She played fifty games for Harvard in three seasons, scoring fifty points (21 goals, 29 assists).

Petrie transferred to Clarkson to continue her studies with a Masters of Business Administration and to continue playing hockey. She was injured through the entire 2022–23 season, tearing her ACL and breaking her tibia. In 2023–24, Petrie scored thirty-five points in forty games (15 goals, 20 assists), second on the team for points production. Petrie scored the game-winning goal in the game that sent Clarkson to the Frozen Four. In a quadruple overtime battle with the University of Minnesota, tied 2-2, Petrie scored the game-winning goal.

=== Professional ===
Petrie was drafted by the Minnesota Frost 27th overall in the 2024 PWHL Draft. She was named to the 2024 opening-day roster. She scored her first goal for the Frost on her regular-season debut against the New York Sirens, tying the game 3-3 and sending it to overtime. During the 2024–25 season, she recorded three goals and seven assists in 18 regular season games. During the 2025 PWHL playoffs, she recorded one assist in seven games to help the Frost win the Walter Cup. On August 6, 2025, she signed a two-year contract extension with the Frost.

== International play ==
Petrie was a member of the U.S. Women's National Under-18 team in three IIHF World Women's U18 Championships, winning gold in 2017, and 2018, and silver in 2019 (as captain). She was also a three-time member of the U.S. Women's Under-18 Select Team at the Under-18 Series and a member of the 2022 U.S. Collegiate Select Team, both competing against Canada.

== Career statistics ==
=== Regular season and playoffs ===
Note: GP = Games played; G = Goals; A = Assists; Pts = Points; PIM = Penalty minutes;

| | | | Regular season | | | | | Playoffs |
| Season | Team | League | GP | G | A | Pts | PIM | GP | G | A | Pts | PIM |
|---|---|---|---|---|---|---|---|---|---|---|---|---|
| 2018–19 | Harvard University | ECAC | 22 | 9 | 6 | 15 | 10 | — | — | — | — | — |
| 2019–20 | Harvard University | ECAC | 28 | 12 | 23 | 35 | 32 | — | — | — | — | — |
| 2021–22 | Harvard University | ECAC | 26 | 9 | 12 | 21 | 31 | — | — | — | — | — |
| 2023–24 | Clarkson University | ECAC | 40 | 15 | 20 | 35 | 26 | — | — | — | — | — |
| 2024–25 | Minnesota Frost | PWHL | 18 | 3 | 7 | 10 | 4 | 7 | 0 | 1 | 1 | 4 |
| NCAA totals | | | 116 | 45 | 61 | 106 | 99 | — | — | — | — | — |
| PWHL totals | | | 18 | 3 | 7 | 10 | 4 | 7 | 0 | 1 | 1 | 4 |

=== International ===
| Year | Team | Event | Result | GP | G | A | Pts | PIM |
|---|---|---|---|---|---|---|---|---|
| 2017 | United States | U18 | 1st place, gold medalist(s) | 5 | 0 | 1 | 1 | 2 |
| 2018 | United States | U18 | 1st place, gold medalist(s) | 5 | 3 | 5 | 8 | 8 |
| 2019 | United States | U18 | 2nd place, silver medalist(s) | 5 | 2 | 1 | 3 | 2 |
| Junior totals | | | | 15 | 5 | 7 | 12 | 12 |

== Awards and honors ==
| Honors | Year |
PWHL
| Walter Cup Champion | 2025 |
