= List of PWHL individual award winners =

Professional Women's Hockey League award winners

Logo of the Professional Women's Hockey League.

The Professional Women's Hockey League (PWHL) presents numerous awards to individual players and personnel at the end of each season, including those recognizing the most valuable players, and the season's best forward, defender, goaltender, rookie, and coach. The recipients of these awards are chosen by a "selection committee with a cross-section of representatives including national and local media, former players, the Professional Women's Hockey League Players Association, and team personnel." Awards honoring the season's top points and goal scorers are also respectively presented by the league.

== Key ==
Key of colors and symbols
Color/symbol	Explanation
†	Selected for an All-Star Showcase
‡	Selected for an All-Star Team
§	PWHL Finals runner-up

== Billie Jean King Most Valuable Player ==
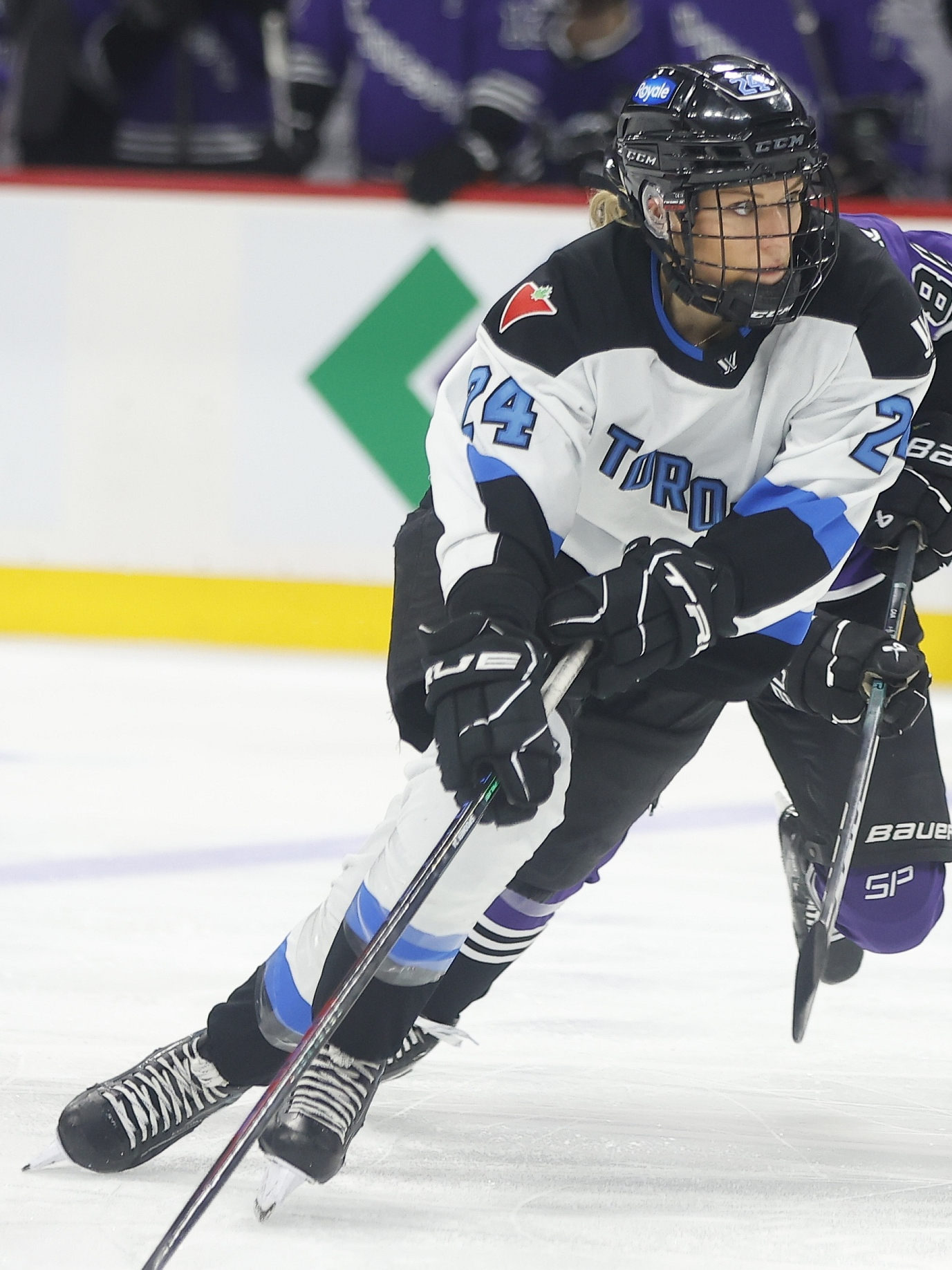
Natalie Spooner won the inaugural Billie Jean King Most Valuable Player and Forward of the Year awards.

The Billie Jean King Most Valuable Player award honors the most valuable player in the overall season, and was named after PWHL Advisory Board member Billie Jean King.

List of winners
Season	Player	Position	Nationality	Team	Ref.
2024	Natalie Spooner‡	Forward	Canada	PWHL Toronto	
2024–25	Marie-Philip Poulin‡	Forward	Canada	Montreal Victoire	
2025–26	Aerin Frankel‡	Goaltender	United States	Boston Fleet	

== Ilana Kloss Playoff Most Valuable Player ==
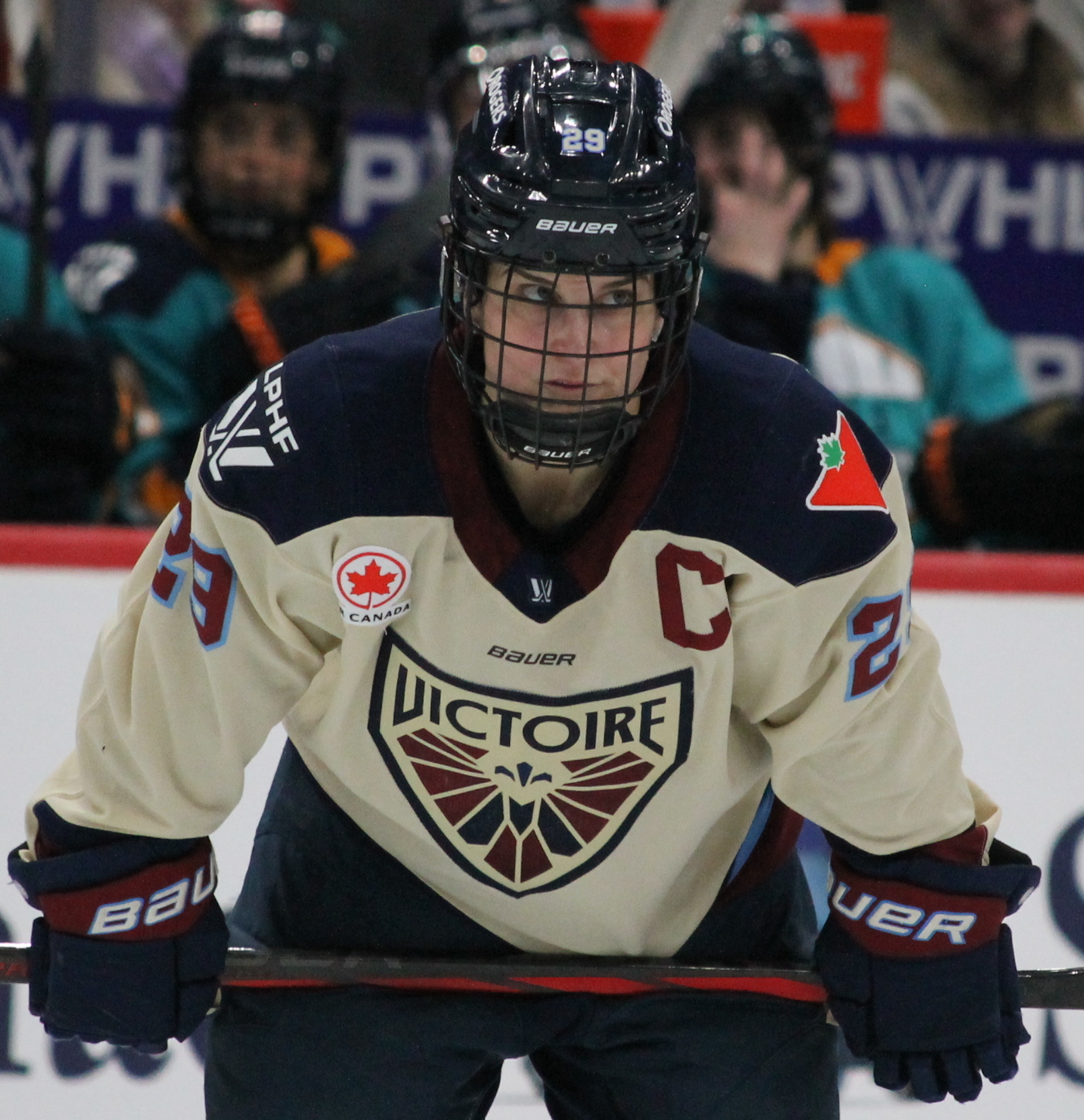
Marie-Philip Poulin won the 2026 Ilana Kloss Playoff Most Valuable Player award.

The Ilana Kloss Playoff Most Valuable Player award honors the most valuable player in the postseason PWHL Playoffs tournament, and was named after PWHL Advisory Board member Ilana Kloss.

List of winners
Season	Player	Position	Nationality	Team	Ref.
2024	Taylor Heise†	Forward	United States	PWHL Minnesota	
2024–25	Gwyneth Philips§	Goaltender	United States	Ottawa Charge	
2025–26	Marie-Philip Poulin	Forward	Canada	Montreal Victoire	

== Forward of the Year ==
The PWHL Forward of the Year award honors the best forward of the season.

List of winners
Season	Player	Nationality	Team	Ref.
2024	Natalie Spooner‡	Canada	PWHL Toronto	
2024–25	Marie-Philip Poulin‡	Canada	Montreal Victoire	
2025–26	Kelly Pannek‡	United States	Minnesota Frost	

== Defender of the Year ==
The PWHL Defender of the Year award honors the best defender of the season.

List of winners
Season	Player	Nationality	Team	Ref.
2024	Erin Ambrose‡	Canada	PWHL Montreal	
2024–25	Renata Fast‡	Canada	Toronto Sceptres	
2025–26	Megan Keller‡	United States	Boston Fleet	

== Goaltender of the Year ==
The PWHL Goaltender of the Year award honors the best goaltender of the season.

List of winners
Season	Player	Nationality	Team	Ref.
2024	Kristen Campbell‡	Canada	PWHL Toronto	
2024–25	Ann-Renée Desbiens‡	Canada	Montreal Victoire	
2025–26	Aerin Frankel‡	United States	Boston Fleet	

== Rookie of the Year ==
The PWHL Rookie of the Year award honors the best rookie of the season.

List of winners
Season	Player	Position	Nationality	Team	Ref.
2024	Grace Zumwinkle‡	Forward	United States	PWHL Minnesota	
2024–25	Sarah Fillier‡	Forward	Canada	New York Sirens	
2025–26	Haley Winn‡	Defender	United States	Boston Fleet	

== Coach of the Year ==
The PWHL Coach of the Year award honors the best head coach of the season.

List of winners
Season	Player	Nationality	Team	Ref.
2024	Troy Ryan	Canada	PWHL Toronto	
2024–25	Kori Cheverie	Canada	Montreal Victoire	
2025–26	Kris Sparre	Canada	Boston Fleet	

== Points Leader Award ==
The PWHL Points Leader Award is presented to the player with the season's most points.

List of winners
Season	Player	Nationality	Team	P	Ref.
2024	Natalie Spooner‡	Canada	PWHL Toronto	27	
2024–25	Hilary Knight	United States	Boston Fleet	29	
2024–25	Sarah Fillier	Canada	New York Sirens	29	
2025–26	Kelly Pannek	United States	Minnesota Frost	33	

== Top Goal Scorer Award ==
The PWHL Top Goal Scorer Award is presented to the player who scored the season's most goals.

List of winners
Season	Player	Nationality	Team	G	Ref.
2024	Natalie Spooner‡	Canada	PWHL Toronto	20	
2024–25	Marie-Philip Poulin‡	Canada	Montreal Victoire	19	
2025–26	Kelly Pannek	United States	Minnesota Frost	16	

== Hockey for All Award ==
The PWHL Hockey for All Award presented by Scotiabank, is awarded to the player who made the greatest impact in their community during the regular season. Scotiabank will donate $10,000 to a Canadian charity of the winner's choice, that supports youth or grassroots hockey, with a focus on accessibility, diversity, and inclusion.

List of winners
Season	Player	Nationality	Team	Ref.
2024	Maureen Murphy	United States	PWHL Montreal	
2024–25	Laura Stacey	Canada	Montreal Victoire	
2025–26	Rebecca Leslie‡	Canada	Ottawa Charge	

== Intact Impact Award ==
The PWHL Intact Impact Award honors players who consistently displayed exceptional leadership, integrity, and commitment. In recognition of their impact, Intact Insurance will donate $20,000 to a charity that supports youth development.

Season	Player	Nationality	Team	Ref.
2024–25	Jamie Lee Rattray	Canada	Boston Fleet	
2024–25	Nicole Hensley	United States	Minnesota Frost	
2024–25	Amanda Boulier	United States	Montreal Victoire	
2024–25	Emmy Fecteau	Canada	New York Sirens	
2024–25	Rebecca Leslie	Canada	Ottawa Charge	
2024–25	Allie Munroe	Canada	Toronto Sceptres	
2025–26
2025–26	Marlène Boissonnault	Canada	Minnesota Frost	
2025–26	Shiann Darkangelo	United States	Montreal Victoire	
2025–26	Emma Woods	Canada	Toronto Sceptres	
2025–26	Ashton Bell	Canada	Vancouver Goldeneyes	

== See also ==
- List of PWHL All-Star teams
- List of PHF individual award winners
- List of sports awards honoring women
