= 2024–25 Minnesota Frost season =

Professional Women's Hockey League season

2024–25 Minnesota Frost
- Walter Cup champions
- League: 4 PWHL
- 2024–25 record: 10–5–4–11
- Home record: 5–3–1–6
- Road record: 5–2–3–5
- Goals for: 85
- Goals against: 76

Team information
- General manager: Melissa Caruso
- Coach: Ken Klee
- Assistant coach: Mira Jalosuo; Chris Johnson; Pete Samargia
- Captain: Kendall Coyne Schofield
- Alternate captains: Kelly Pannek; Lee Stecklein
- Arena: Xcel Energy Center
- Average attendance: 6,524

Team leaders
- Goals: Kendall Coyne Schofield (12)
- Assists: Sophie Jaques (15)
- Points: Kendall Coyne Schofield (24)
- Penalty minutes: Brooke McQuigge (25)
- Plus/minus: Mae Batherson (+13)
- Wins: Maddie Rooney (8)
- Goals against average: Maddie Rooney (2.07)

The 2024–25 Minnesota Frost season was the team's second season as a member of the Professional Women's Hockey League. They played their home games at the Xcel Energy Center in Saint Paul, Minnesota. The Frost defeated the Toronto Sceptres in the semifinals of the 2025 PWHL playoffs to advance to the 2025 PWHL Finals. During the Finals they defeated the Ottawa Charge to win their second consecutive Walter Cup.

== Offseason ==
- On June 7, 2024, one week after winning the league's inaugural championship and with only days before the draft, it was reported the general manager Natalie Darwitz would not return for the 2024–25 season. Darwitz was instead offered alternative options within the league.

== Standings ==
Pos	Team	Pld	W	OTW	OTL	L	GF	GA	GD	Pts	Qualification
1	Montreal Victoire (Y)	30	12	7	3	8	77	67	+10	53	Playoffs
2	Toronto Sceptres (X)	30	12	3	6	9	73	73	0	48	Playoffs
3	Ottawa Charge (X)	30	12	2	4	12	71	80	−9	44 (Note: Regulation wins: Ottawa 12, Minnesota 10, Boston 9)	Playoffs
4	Minnesota Frost (X)	30	10	5	4	11	85	76	+9	44	Playoffs
5	Boston Fleet (E)	30	9	6	5	10	75	76	−1	44	
6	New York Sirens (E)	30	8	4	5	13	71	80	−9	37	

Updated to match(es) played on May 3, 2025. Source: PWHL
(E) Eliminated; (X) Clinched playoff berth; (Y) Clinched first place

== Schedule and results ==
=== Preseason ===
The preseason schedule was published on October 1, 2024.

All times in Central Time.

Pre-season camp

Date	Time	Visitor	Score	Home	OT	Notes	Box Score/Recap
November 20	1:15	Toronto	1–3	Minnesota		@ Ford Performance Centre	
November 21	1:30	Minnesota	4–3	New York	OT	@ Ford Performance Centre	

=== Regular season ===
The regular season schedule was announced on October 15, 2024. The Frost's season will begin on December 1, 2024, and will end on May 3, 2025, with each team playing 30 games; six games against every opponent.

Regular season schedule (Home: 5–3–1–6; Road: 5–2–3–5)
December: 3–1–1–1, 12 points (Home: 1–0–1–1; Road: 2–1–0–0)

Game	Date	Opponent	Score	OT	Decision	Location	Attendance	Record	Points	Recap
1	December 1	New York	3–4	OT	Hensley	Xcel Energy Center	8,022	0–0–1–0	1	
2	December 4	@ Boston	2–1		Rooney	Tsongas Center	3,811	1–0–1–0	4	
3	December 7	@ Toronto	6–3		Rooney	Coca-Cola Coliseum	7,584	2–0–1–0	7	
4	December 19	Ottawa	5–2		Rooney	Xcel Energy Center	4,686	3–0–1–0	10	
5	December 22	@ New York	4–3	SO	Hensley	Prudential Center	2,722	3–1–1–0	12	
6	December 28	Montreal	2–3		Rooney	Xcel Energy Center	8,726	3–1–1–1	12	

January: 2–3–1–3, 13 points (Home: 2–3–0–2; Road: 0–0–1–1)

Game	Date	Opponent	Score	OT	Decision	Location	Attendance	Record	Points	Recap
7	January 2	Boston	4–3	OT	Hensley	Xcel Energy Center	5,066	3–2–1–1	14	
8	January 4	New York	0–5		Morgan	Xcel Energy Center	6,414	3–2–1–2	14	
9	January 8	Boston	2–1	OT	Rooney	Xcel Energy Center	4,248	3–3–1–2	16	
10	January 12	Montreal	4–2		Rooney	Ball Arena	14,018	4–3–1–2	19	
11	January 15	@ New York	2–3	SO	Rooney	Prudential Center	1,780	4–3–2–2	20	
12	January 17	@ Montreal	2–4		Hensley	Place Bell	10,172	4–3–2–3	20	
13	January 21	Ottawa	0–1		Rooney	Xcel Energy Center	4,165	4–3–2–4	20	
14	January 26	Boston	5–2		Hensley	Xcel Energy Center	7,838	5–3–2–4	23	
15	January 28	Toronto	4–3	SO	Rooney	Xcel Energy Center	4,540	5–4–2–4	25	

February: 1–0–1–3, 4 points (Home: 0–0–0–1; Road: 1–0–1–2)

Game	Date	Opponent	Score	OT	Decision	Location	Attendance	Record	Points	Recap
16	February 11	@ Toronto	2–3	OT	Rooney	Coca-Cola Coliseum	8,183	5–4–3–4	26	
17	February 13	@ Ottawa	3–8		Hensley	TD Place Arena	5,854	5–4–3–5	26	
18	February 16	@ Boston	2–4		Rooney	Tsongas Center	6,032	5–4–3–6	26	
19	February 18	@ Montreal	4–0		Rooney	Place Bell	6,696	6–4–3–6	29	
20	February 23	Toronto	2–1		Rooney	Xcel Energy Center	8,770	6–4–3–7	29	

March: 2–1–1–3, 9 points (Home: 2–0–0–1; Road: 0–1–1–2)

Game	Date	Opponent	Score	OT	Decision	Location	Attendance	Record	Points	Recap
21	March 4	@ Montreal	1–2	SO	Rooney	Place Bell	8,923	6–4–4–7	30	
22	March 7	Ottawa	5–0		Rooney	Lenovo Center	10,782	7–4–4–7	33	
23	March 9	@ Toronto	2–1	OT	Hensley	Coca-Cola Coliseum	8,510	7–5–4–7	35	
24	March 11	@ Ottawa	2–3		Rooney	TD Place Arena	5,851	7–5–4–8	35	
25	March 16	@ New York	1–4		Hensley	Little Caesars Arena	14,288	7–5–4–9	35	
26	March 26	Montreal	1–4		Rooney	Xcel Energy Center	6,330	7–5–4–10	35	
27	March 30	Toronto	5–2		Hensley	Xcel Energy Center	9,536	8–5–4–10	38	

April: 1–0–0–1, 3 points (Home: 0–0–0–1; Road: 1–0–0–0)

Game	Date	Opponent	Score	OT	Decision	Location	Attendance	Record	Points	Recap
28	April 27	New York	0–2		Rooney	Xcel Energy Center	6,472	8–5–4–11	38	
29	April 30	@ Ottawa	3–0		Hensley	TD Place Arena	5,494	9–5–4–11	41	

May: 1–0–0–0, 3 points (Home: 0–0–0–0; Road: 1–0–0–0)

Game	Date	Opponent	Score	OT	Decision	Location	Attendance	Record	Points	Recap
30	May 3	Boston	8–1		Hensley	Tsongas Center	5,013	10–5–4–11	44	

Regulation Win (3 points) Overtime/Shootout win (2 points) Overtime/shootout loss (1 point) Regulation Loss (0 points)

=== Playoffs ===
On May 4, the first-place Montreal Victoire announced that they chose to play the third-place Ottawa Charge in the first round. This decision meant that fourth-place Minnesota would play the second-place Toronto Sceptres in a re-match of last year's semi-finals.

2025 PWHL Playoffs
First round vs. Toronto Sceptres; Minnesota won 3–1

Game	Date	Opponent	Score	OT	Decision	Location	Attendance	Series	Recap
1	May 7	@ Toronto	2–3		Hensley	Coca-Cola Coliseum	6,868	0–1	
2	May 9	@ Toronto	5–3		Rooney	Coca-Cola Coliseum	7,659	1–1	
3	May 11	Toronto	7–5		Rooney	Xcel Energy Center	3,917	2–1	
4	May 14	Toronto	4–3	OT	Hensley	Xcel Energy Center	3,107	3–1	

2025 PWHL Finals vs. Ottawa Charge; Minnesota wins 3–1

Game	Date	Opponent	Score	OT	Decision	Location	Attendance	Series	Recap
1	May 20	@ Ottawa	1–2	OT	Hensley	TD Place Arena	6,184	0–1	
2	May 22	@ Ottawa	2–1	OT	Rooney	TD Place Arena	8,206	1–1	
3	May 24	Ottawa	2–1	3OT	Rooney	Xcel Energy Center	8,098	2–1	
4	May 26	Ottawa	2–1	OT	Rooney	Xcel Energy Center	11,024	3–1	

== Player statistics ==
As of May 26, 2025

=== Skaters ===
Regular season
Player	GP	G	A	Pts	SOG	+/−	PIM
Kendall Coyne Schofield	30	12	12	24	86	+12	4
Taylor Heise	29	8	14	22	69	+1	6
Sophie Jaques	25	7	15	22	75	+12	10
Michela Cava	30	9	10	19	53	+11	10
Claire Thompson	30	4	14	18	51	+1	8
Britta Curl-Salemme	28	9	6	15	64	+3	24
Brooke McQuigge	29	8	7	15	40	+2	25
Kelly Pannek	30	3	8	11	51	+3	12
Grace Zumwinkle	22	4	6	10	49	–7	0
Dominique Petrie	18	3	7	10	32	+2	4
Denisa Křížová	30	4	5	9	52	+6	12
Lee Stecklein	30	3	6	9	33	–2	6
Mellissa Channell-Watkins	29	1	6	7	31	+4	2
Liz Schepers	27	2	4	6	29	–1	0
Claire Butorac	29	2	3	5	13	0	8
Brooke Bryant	26	1	3	4	12	–1	6
Mae Batherson	25	0	3	3	20	+13	6
Katy Knoll	21	1	1	2	11	–2	6
Maggie Flaherty	22	1	1	2	28	–5	12
Klára Hymlárová	29	1	1	2	21	–1	4
Natalie Buchbinder	19	0	2	2	19	–2	2
Charlotte Akervik	2	0	0	0	0	–1	0
Kaitlyn O'Donohoe	9	0	0	0	5	–2	0

Playoffs
Player	GP	G	A	Pts	SOG	+/−	PIM
Lee Stecklein	8	4	4	8	12	+1	2
Sophie Jaques	8	2	5	7	25	+1	0
Taylor Heise	8	1	6	7	15	–1	2
Claire Thompson	8	0	6	6	17	+2	4
Michela Cava	8	3	2	5	17	–3	4
Katy Knoll	8	2	3	5	12	+2	0
Kelly Pannek	8	2	3	5	16	+1	2
Mellissa Channell-Watkins	8	1	4	5	9	+5	0
Klára Hymlárová	8	1	4	5	9	+1	0
Kendall Coyne Schofield	8	2	2	4	27	+1	0
Britta Curl-Salemme	7	3	0	3	9	0	15
Brooke McQuigge	8	2	1	3	13	0	2
Liz Schepers	8	2	1	3	5	+4	2
Grace Zumwinkle	8	0	3	3	25	+4	4
Dominique Petrie	7	0	1	1	2	–1	4
Mae Batherson	3	0	0	0	1	–2	0
Brooke Bryant	3	0	0	0	0	0	0
Claire Butorac	6	0	0	0	1	0	0
Maggie Flaherty	6	0	0	0	6	–1	4
Natalie Buchbinder	8	0	0	0	4	–4	2
Denisa Křížová	8	0	0	0	10	0	0

=== Goaltenders ===
Regular season
Player	GP	TOI	W	L	OT	SOL	GA	GAA	SA	SV%	SO	G	A	PIM
Maddie Rooney	19	1129:12	8	7	1	2	39	2.07	418	0.907	2	0	0	0
Nicole Hensley	11	639:26	7	3	1	0	27	2.53	270	0.900	1	0	0	0
Lucy Morgan	1	60:00	0	1	0	0	5	5.00	34	0.853	0	0	0	0

Playoffs
Player	GP	TOI	W	L	OT	SOL	GA	GAA	SA	SV%	SO	G	A	PIM
Maddie Rooney	5	376:32	5	0	0	0	11	1.75	161	0.932	0	0	0	0
Nicole Hensley	3	197:12	1	1	1	0	8	2.43	85	0.906	0	0	0	0

== Awards and honors ==
=== Milestones ===
Regular season
Date	Player	Milestone
December 1, 2024	Kelly Pannek	15th career PWHL assist
December 1, 2024	Dominique Petrie	1st career PWHL goal
December 1, 2024	Dominique Petrie	1st career PWHL game
December 1, 2024	Britta Curl-Salemme	1st career PWHL assist
December 1, 2024	Britta Curl-Salemme	1st career PWHL game
December 1, 2024	Claire Thompson	1st career PWHL assist
December 1, 2024	Claire Thompson	1st career PWHL game
December 1, 2024	Klára Hymlárová	1st career PWHL game
December 1, 2024	Brooke McQuigge	1st career PWHL game
December 4, 2024	Michela Cava	10th career PWHL goal
December 7, 2024	Britta Curl-Salemme	1st career PWHL goal
December 7, 2024	Klára Hymlárová	1st career PWHL assist
December 7, 2024	Mae Batherson	1st career PWHL penalty
December 7, 2024	Mae Batherson	1st career PWHL game
December 7, 2024	Kendall Coyne Schofield	15th career PWHL assist
December 7, 2024	Taylor Heise	15th career PWHL assist
December 7, 2024	Katy Knoll	1st career PWHL game
December 19, 2024	Grace Zumwinkle	15th career PWHL goal
December 19, 2024	Kelly Pannek	5th career PWHL goal
December 19, 2024	Claire Thompson	1st career PWHL goal
December 19, 2024	Claire Thompson	5th career PWHL assist
December 19, 2024	Britta Curl-Salemme	1st career PWHL penalty
December 22, 2024	Kendall Coyne Schofield	10th career PWHL goal
December 22, 2024	Taylor Heise	10th career PWHL goal
December 28, 2024	Brooke McQuigge	1st career PWHL goal
December 28, 2024	Claire Butorac	5th career PWHL assist
December 28, 2024	Claire Thompson	1st career PWHL penalty
December 28, 2024	Charlotte Akervik	1st career PWHL game
January 2, 2025	Britta Curl-Salemme	1st career overtime goal
January 2, 2025	Lee Stecklein	10th career PWHL assist
January 2, 2025	Claire Butorac	5th career PWHL assist
January 2, 2025	Mae Batherson	1st career PWHL assist
January 4, 2025	Lucy Morgan	1st career PWHL loss
January 4, 2025	Lucy Morgan	1st career PWHL game
January 4, 2025	Katy Knoll	1st career PWHL penalty
January 4, 2025	Kaitlyn O'Donohoe	1st career PWHL game
January 12, 2025	Britta Curl-Salemme	5th career PWHL goal
January 12, 2025	Sophie Jaques	5th career PWHL goal
January 12, 2025	Sophie Jaques	15th career PWHL assist
January 12, 2025	Denisa Křížová	5th career PWHL assist
January 15, 2025	Mellissa Channell-Watkins	1st career PWHL goal
January 17, 2025	Taylor Heise	20th career PWHL assist
January 17, 2025	Claire Thompson	10th career PWHL assist
January 26, 2025	Katy Knoll	1st career PWHL goal
January 26, 2025	Katy Knoll	1st career PWHL assist
January 26, 2025	Kendall Coyne Schofield	20th career PWHL assist
January 26, 2025	Michela Cava	10th career PWHL assist
January 26, 2025	Mellissa Channell-Watkins	10th career PWHL assist
January 28, 2025	Michela Cava	15th career PWHL goal
January 28, 2025	Brooke McQuigge	1st career PWHL assist
February 11, 2025	Klára Hymlárová	1st career PWHL penalty
February 16, 2025	Brooke McQuigge	5th career PWHL goal
February 16, 2025	Sophie Jaques	20th career PWHL assist
February 16, 2025	Kelly Pannek	20th career PWHL assist
February 18, 2025	Kendall Coyne Schofield	15th career PWHL goal
February 18, 2025	Dominique Petrie	1st career PWHL assist
March 7, 2025	Grace Zumwinkle	10th career PWHL assist
March 7, 2025	Britta Curl-Salemme	5th career PWHL assist
March 11, 2025	Taylor Heise	15th career PWHL goal
March 30, 2025	Michela Cava	15th career PWHL assist
March 30, 2025	Lee Stecklein	15th career PWHL assist
March 30, 2025	Brooke McQuigge	5th career PWHL assist
March 30, 2025	Dominique Petrie	5th career PWHL assist
March 30, 2025	Dominique Petrie	1st career PWHL penalty
May 3, 2025	Sophie Jaques	10th career PWHL goal
May 3, 2025	Lee Stecklein	5th career PWHL goal
May 3, 2025	Klára Hymlárová	1st career PWHL goal
May 3, 2025	Liz Schepers	10th career PWHL assist

Playoffs
May 7, 2025	Britta Curl-Salemme	10th career PWHL goal
May 7, 2025	Britta Curl-Salemme	1st career PWHL playoff goal
May 7, 2025	Katy Knoll	1st career PWHL playoff goal
May 7, 2025	Liz Schepers	5th career PWHL playoff assist
May 7, 2025	Claire Thompson	15th career PWHL assist
May 7, 2025	Claire Thompson	1st career PWHL playoff assist
May 7, 2025	Klára Hymlárová	1st career PWHL playoff assist
May 9, 2025	Michela Cava	5th career PWHL playoff goal
May 9, 2025	Lee Stecklein	1st career PWHL playoff goal
May 9, 2025	Lee Stecklein	5th career PWHL playoff assist
May 9, 2025	Mellissa Channell-Watkins	1st career PWHL playoff goal
May 9, 2025	Taylor Heise	5th career PWHL playoff assist
May 9, 2025	Dominique Petrie	1st career PWHL playoff assist
May 11, 2025	Brooke McQuigge	10th career PWHL goal
May 11, 2025	Brooke McQuigge	1st career PWHL playoff goal
May 11, 2025	Taylor Heise	30th career PWHL assist
May 11, 2025	Grace Zumwinkle	15th career PWHL assist
May 11, 2025	Grace Zumwinkle	1st career PWHL playoff assist
May 11, 2025	Kendall Coyne Schofield	5th career PWHL playoff assist
May 11, 2025	Mellissa Channell-Watkins	5th career PWHL playoff assist
May 11, 2025	Sophie Jaques	5th career PWHL playoff assist
May 11, 2025	Katy Knoll	1st career PWHL playoff assist
May 14, 2025	Kendall Coyne Schofield	20th career PWHL goal
May 14, 2025	Kelly Pannek	1st career PWHL playoff goal
May 14, 2025	Sophie Jaques	30th career PWHL assist
May 14, 2025	Mellissa Channell-Watkins	15th career PWHL assist
May 14, 2025	Michela Cava	5th career PWHL playoff assist
May 14, 2025	Brooke McQuigge	1st career PWHL playoff assist
May 20, 2025	Klára Hymlárová	1st career PWHL playoff goal
May 24, 2025	Claire Thompson	5th career PWHL playoff assist
May 26, 2025	Liz Schepers	2nd career Walter Cup-winning goal
May 26, 2025	Liz Schepers	5th career PWHL goal
May 26, 2025	Claire Thompson	20th career PWHL assist
May 26, 2025	Klára Hymlárová	5th career PWHL assist

=== Honors ===
- December 9, 2024: Michela Cava was named the Second Star of the Week
- December 23, 2024: Claire Thompson and Kendall Coyne Schofield were awarded the First and Third Stars of the Week
- On January 2, 2025, Claire Thompson was named to the December SupraStars of the Month team
- January 20, 2025: Kendall Coyne Schofield was named Third Star of the Week
- January 27, 2025: Taylor Heise was named PWHL Third Star of the Week
- On February 3, 2025, Kendall Coyne Schofield and Claire Thompson were named as January SupraStars of the Month
- February 17, 2025: Sophie Jaques was named PWHL Third Star of the Week
- On March 3, 2025, Sophie Jaques was named to the February SupraStars of the Month team
- March 10, 2025: Maddie Rooney earned PWHL Third Star of the Week
- On April 3, 2025, Sophie Jaques was named to the PWHL SupraStars of the Month team for March

== Transactions ==
Minnesota has been involved in the following transactions during the 2024–25 PWHL season.

=== Signings ===
Players the Minnesota Frost have signed
Date	Player	Position	Term	Previous team	Ref
June 21, 2024	Michela Cava	F	1 year	Minnesota Frost	
June 21, 2024	Denisa Křížová	F	1 year (Note: This represents a 1-year extension to the 2-year contract Křížová signed prior to the inaugural PWHL season.)	Minnesota Frost	
June 21, 2024	Liz Schepers	F	1 year	Minnesota Frost	
June 21, 2024	Britta Curl	F	2 years	Wisconsin	
June 21, 2024	Klára Hymlárová	F	2 years	St. Cloud State	
August 2, 2024	Claire Thompson	D	2 years	Team Sonnet	

== Draft picks ==
Below are Minnesota's selections at the 2024 PWHL Draft, which was held on June 10, 2024, at Roy Wilkins Auditorium in Saint Paul.

Minnesota Frost 2024 draft picks
Round	#	Player	Pos	Nationality	College/junior/club team	Reference
1	3	Claire Thompson	D	Canada	Did not play	
2	9	Britta Curl	F	United States	Wisconsin Badgers (WCHA)	
3	15	Klára Hymlárová	F	Czech Republic	St. Cloud State Huskies (WCHA)	
4	21	Brooke McQuigge	F	Canada	Clarkson Golden Knights (ECAC)	
5	27	Dominique Petrie	F	United States	Clarkson Golden Knights (ECAC)	
6	33	Mae Batherson	D	Canada	St. Lawrence Saints (ECAC)	
7	39	Katy Knoll	F	United States	Northeastern Huskies (Hockey East)	
