= 2024–25 Ottawa Charge season =

Professional Women's Hockey League season

2024–25 Ottawa Charge
- League: 3 PWHL
- 2024–25 record: 12–2–4–12
- Home record: 5–1–3–6
- Road record: 7–1–1–6
- Goals for: 71
- Goals against: 80

Team information
- General manager: Mike Hirshfeld
- Coach: Carla MacLeod
- Assistant coach: Haley Irwin; Dean Jackson
- Captain: Brianne Jenner
- Alternate captains: Emily Clark; Jincy Roese
- Arena: TD Place Arena
- Average attendance: 6,888

Team leaders
- Goals: Tereza Vanišová (15)
- Assists: Gabbie Hughes; Jincy Roese (11)
- Points: Tereza Vanišová (22)
- Penalty minutes: Tereza Vanišová (38)
- Plus/minus: Ronja Savolainen (+11)
- Wins: Gwyneth Philips (8)
- Goals against average: Gwyneth Philips (2.11)

The 2024–25 Ottawa Charge season was the team's second season as a member of the Professional Women's Hockey League. They play their home games at TD Place Arena in Ottawa. The Charge advanced to the 2025 PWHL playoffs for the first time in franchise history. They defeated the Montreal Victoire in the semifinals before losing to the Minnesota Frost in the 2025 PWHL Finals.

== Standings ==
Pos	Team	Pld	W	OTW	OTL	L	GF	GA	GD	Pts	Qualification
1	Montreal Victoire (Y)	30	12	7	3	8	77	67	+10	53	Playoffs
2	Toronto Sceptres (X)	30	12	3	6	9	73	73	0	48	Playoffs
3	Ottawa Charge (X)	30	12	2	4	12	71	80	−9	44 (Note: Regulation wins: Ottawa 12, Minnesota 10, Boston 9)	Playoffs
4	Minnesota Frost (X)	30	10	5	4	11	85	76	+9	44	Playoffs
5	Boston Fleet (E)	30	9	6	5	10	75	76	−1	44	
6	New York Sirens (E)	30	8	4	5	13	71	80	−9	37	

Updated to match(es) played on May 3, 2025. Source: PWHL
(E) Eliminated; (X) Clinched playoff berth; (Y) Clinched first place

== Schedule and results ==
=== Preseason ===
The preseason schedule was published on October 1, 2024.

All times in Eastern Time.

Pre-season camp

Date	Time	Visitor	Score	Home	OT	Notes	Recap
November 21	2:00	Boston	1–6	Ottawa		@ Verdun Auditorium	
November 22	2:00	Ottawa	3–6	Montreal		@ Verdun Auditorium	

=== Regular season ===
The regular season schedule was published on October 15, 2024.

Regular season schedule (Home: 5–1–3–6; Road: 7–1–1–6)
November: 0–0–1–0, 1 points (Home: 0–0–0–0; Road: 0–0–1–0)

Game	Date	Opponent	Score	OT	Decision	Location	Attendance	Record	Points	Recap
1	November 30	@ Montreal	3–4	SO	Maschmeyer	Place Bell	10,033	0–0–1–0	1	

December: 3–0–0–3, 9 points (Home: 1–0–0–1; Road: 2–0–0–2)

Game	Date	Opponent	Score	OT	Decision	Location	Attendance	Record	Points	Recap
2	December 3	Toronto	3–2		Maschmeyer	TD Place Arena	6,451	1–0–1–0	4	
3	December 6	Montreal	1–2		Maschmeyer	Canadian Tire Centre	11,065	1–0–1–1	4	
4	December 17	@ Boston	2–3		Maschmeyer	Tsongas Center	2,854	1–0–1–2	4	
5	December 19	@ Minnesota	2–5		Philips	Xcel Energy Center	4,686	1–0–1–3	4	
6	December 29	@ New York	3–1		Maschmeyer	Prudential Center	2,946	2–0–1–3	7	
7	December 31	@ Toronto	2–1		Maschmeyer	Coca-Cola Coliseum	8,278	3–0–1–3	10	

January: 2–0–1–4, 7 points (Home: 0–0–1–2; Road: 2–0–0–2)

Game	Date	Opponent	Score	OT	Decision	Location	Attendance	Record	Points	Recap
8	January 7	@ New York	3–2		Maschmeyer	Prudential Center	1,569	4–0–1–3	13	
9	January 11	Boston	1–2	OT	Philips	TD Place Arena	8,295	4–0–2–3	14	
10	January 14	Toronto	2–4		Maschmeyer	TD Place Arena	6,526	4–0–2–4	14	
11	January 19	@ Montreal	1–2		Maschmeyer	Videotron Centre	18,259	4–0–2–5	14	
12	January 21	@ Minnesota	1–0		Philips	Xcel Energy Center	4,165	5–0–2–5	17	
13	January 27	New York	0–3		Maschmeyer	TD Place Arena	5,629	5–0–2–6	17	
14	January 29	@ Montreal	1–4		Philips	Place Bell	6,150	5–0–2–7	17	

February: 2–1–2–1, 10 points (Home: 2–1–2–0; Road: 0–0–0–1)

Game	Date	Opponent	Score	OT	Decision	Location	Attendance	Record	Points	Recap
15	February 1	@ Toronto	2–4		Maschmeyer	Coca-Cola Coliseum	8,351	5–0–2–8	17	
16	February 13	Minnesota	8–3		Maschmeyer	TD Place Arena	5,854	6–0–2–8	20	
17	February 16	Toronto	2–3	OT	Maschmeyer	Rogers Place	17,518	6–0–3–8	21	
18	February 20	Boston	2–3	OT	Maschmeyer	TD Place Arena	5,458	6–0–4–8	22	
19	February 22	Montreal	3–1		Philips	TD Place Arena	8,424	7–0–4–8	25	
20	February 26	New York	5–4	OT	Maschmeyer	TD Place Arena	5,005	7–1–4–8	27	

March: 3–0–0–3, 9 points (Home: 1–0–0–2; Road: 2–0–0–1)

Game	Date	Opponent	Score	OT	Decision	Location	Attendance	Record	Points	Recap
21	March 7	@ Minnesota	0–5		Maschmeyer	Lenovo Center	10,782	7–1–4–9	27	
22	March 11	Minnesota	3–2		Philips	TD Place Arena	5,851	8–1–4–9	30	
23	March 15	Boston	2–5		Philips	TD Place Arena	8,096	8–1–4–10	30	
24	March 22	@ New York	5–2		Philips	Prudential Center	4,767	9–1–4–10	33	
25	March 25	New York	3–6		Philips	TD Place Arena	5,707	9–1–4–11	33	
26	March 29	@ Boston	2–1		Philips	Enterprise Center	8,578	10–1–4–11	36	

April: 2–0–0–1, 6 points (Home: 1–0–0–1; Road: 1–0–0–0)

Game	Date	Opponent	Score	OT	Decision	Location	Attendance	Record	Points	Recap
27	April 2	@ Boston	4–0		Philips	Tsongas Center	3,807	11–1–4–11	39	
28	April 26	Montreal	3–2		Philips	TD Place Arena	8,576	12–1–4–11	42	
29	April 30	Minnesota	0–3		Philips	TD Place Arena	5,494	12–1–4–12	42	

May: 0–1–0–0, 2 points (Home: 0–0–0–0; Road: 0–1–0–0)

Game	Date	Opponent	Score	OT	Decision	Location	Attendance	Record	Points	Recap
30	May 3	@ Toronto	2–1	OT	Philips	Coca-Cola Coliseum	8,593	12–2–4–12	44	

Regulation Win (3 points) Overtime/Shootout win (2 points) Overtime/shootout loss (1 point) Regulation Loss (0 points)

=== Playoffs ===
Ottawa clinched a playoff berth in their last regular season game against Toronto, after Kateřina Mrázová scored in overtime to win the game for the Charge.

2025 PWHL playoffs
First round vs. Montreal Victoire: Ottawa wins series 3–1

Game	Date	Opponent	Score	OT	Decision	Location	Attendance	Series	Recap
1	May 8	@ Montreal	3–2		Philips	Place Bell	6,570	1–0	
2	May 11	@ Montreal	2–3	4OT	Philips	Place Bell	7,114	1–1	
3	May 13	Montreal	1–0		Philips	TD Place Arena	7,282	2–1	
4	May 16	Montreal	2–1		Philips	TD Place Arena	8,011	3–1	

2025 PWHL Finals vs. Minnesota Frost; Minnesota wins series 3–1

Game	Date	Opponent	Score	OT	Decision	Location	Attendance	Series	Recap
1	May 20	Minnesota	2–1	OT	Philips	TD Place Arena	6,184	1–0	
2	May 22	Minnesota	1–2	OT	Philips	TD Place Arena	8,206	1–1	
3	May 24	@ Minnesota	1–2	3OT	Philips	Xcel Energy Center	8,098	1–2	
4	May 26	@ Minnesota	1–2	OT	Philips	Xcel Energy Center	11,024	1–3	

== Player statistics ==
As of May 26, 2025

=== Skaters ===
Regular season
Player	GP	G	A	Pts	SOG	+/−	PIM
Tereza Vanišová	30	15	7	22	87	–2	38
Emily Clark	30	9	10	19	87	+1	10
Shiann Darkangelo	29	8	9	17	53	+6	12
Gabbie Hughes	29	5	11	16	45	–2	16
Brianne Jenner	28	7	8	15	68	–1	8
Jincy Roese	27	3	11	14	38	–9	14
Ronja Savolainen	28	2	9	11	47	+11	18
Aneta Tejralová	30	1	9	10	24	+4	18
Mannon McMahon	30	4	4	8	34	+2	6
Danielle Serdachny	30	2	6	8	48	–6	18
Kateřina Mrázová	14	3	4	7	19	–4	6
Ashton Bell	27	3	3	6	23	+1	0
Victoria Bach	24	2	3	5	29	+4	4
Stephanie Markowski	28	1	4	5	15	+2	10
Jocelyne Larocque	24	0	5	5	21	–2	12
Alexa Vasko	24	2	2	4	21	+7	8
Rebecca Leslie	27	1	2	3	30	–6	4
Zoe Boyd	23	0	3	3	19	+2	25
Taylor House	15	1	1	2	5	–3	2
Natalie Snodgrass	21	1	1	2	22	–2	2
Anna Meixner	28	1	1	2	25	–5	6
Jessica Adolfsson	1	0	0	0	0	0	0
Samantha Isbell	4	0	0	0	4	–1	2

Playoffs
Player	GP	G	A	Pts	SOG	+/−	PIM
Emily Clark	8	3	2	5	26	+3	2
Jocelyne Larocque	8	1	3	4	14	+3	2
Tereza Vanišová	8	1	3	4	33	0	8
Brianne Jenner	8	2	1	3	26	–1	4
Rebecca Leslie	8	2	1	3	17	+2	6
Gabbie Hughes	8	0	3	3	17	+2	4
Ashton Bell	8	1	1	2	15	+1	0
Aneta Tejralová	8	1	1	2	11	+1	0
Anna Meixner	8	0	2	2	13	+1	0
Danielle Serdachny	8	0	2	2	10	0	2
Shiann Darkangelo	8	1	0	1	21	+1	0
Mannon McMahon	8	1	0	1	17	+1	0
Ronja Savolainen	8	0	1	1	16	0	6
Jincy Roese	1	0	0	0	0	0	0
Samantha Isbell	4	0	0	0	0	0	0
Taylor House	5	0	0	0	2	0	4
Kateřina Mrázová	6	0	0	0	9	+1	0
Victoria Bach	8	0	0	0	3	–1	0
Zoe Boyd	8	0	0	0	6	–1	4
Stephanie Markowski	8	0	0	0	7	–1	2
Alexa Vasko	8	0	0	0	4	–1	0

=== Goaltenders ===
Regular season
Player	GP	TOI	W	L	OT	SOL	GA	GAA	SA	SV%	SO	G	A	PIM
Emerance Maschmeyer	18	999:47	6	7	2	1	43	2.58	496	0.913	0	0	1	0
Gwyneth Philips	15	794:31	8	5	1	0	28	2.11	344	0.919	2	0	0	0

Playoffs
Player	GP	TOI	W	L	OT	SOL	GA	GAA	SA	SV%	SO	G	A	PIM
Gwyneth Philips	8	635:25	4	0	4	0	13	1.23	270	0.952	1	0	0	0

== Awards and honours ==
=== Milestones ===
Regular season
Date	Player	Milestone
November 30, 2024	Emily Clark	5th career PWHL goal
November 30, 2024	Danielle Serdachny	1st career PWHL goal
November 30, 2024	Danielle Serdachny	1st career PWHL game
November 30, 2024	Ronja Savolainen	1st career PWHL assist
November 30, 2024	Ronja Savolainen	1st career PWHL game
November 30, 2024	Stephanie Markowski	1st career PWHL game
November 30, 2024	Mannon McMahon	1st career PWHL game
November 30, 2024	Anna Meixner	1st career PWHL game
December 3, 2024	Mannon McMahon	1st career PWHL goal
December 3, 2024	Jincy Roese	1st career PWHL goal
December 3, 2024	Alexa Vasko	1st career PWHL assist
December 3, 2024	Ronja Savolainen	1st career PWHL penalty
December 6, 2024	Stephanie Markowski	1st career PWHL assist
December 6, 2024	Mannon McMahon	1st career PWHL penalty
December 17, 2024	Shiann Darkangelo	1st career PWHL goal
December 17, 2024	Danielle Serdachny	1st career PWHL assist
December 17, 2024	Taylor House	1st career PWHL game
December 19, 2024	Tereza Vanišová	5th career PWHL goal
December 19, 2024	Anna Meixner	1st career PWHL goal
December 19, 2024	Gwyneth Philips	1st career PWHL loss
December 19, 2024	Gwyneth Philips	1st career PWHL game
December 29, 2024	Kateřina Mrázová	15th career PWHL assist
December 31, 2024	Ronja Savolainen	1st career PWHL goal
January 7, 2025	Brianne Jenner	15th career PWHL assist
January 7, 2025	Victoria Bach	5th career PWHL assist
January 11, 2025	Samantha Isbell	1st career PWHL penalty
January 11, 2025	Jessica Adolfsson	1st career PWHL game
January 14, 2025	Victoria Bach	5th career PWHL goal
January 19, 2025	Zoe Boyd	5th career PWHL assist
January 19, 2025	Stephanie Markowski	1st career PWHL penalty
January 21, 2025	Brianne Jenner	10th career PWHL goal
January 21, 2025	Gabbie Hughes	5th career PWHL assist
January 21, 2025	Gwyneth Philips	1st career PWHL shutout
January 21, 2025	Gwyneth Philips	1st career PWHL win
February 13, 2025	Tereza Vanišová	1st career PWHL hat-trick
February 13, 2025	Gabbie Hughes	10th career PWHL goal
February 13, 2025	Emily Clark	15th career PWHL assist
February 13, 2025	Aneta Tejralová	10th career PWHL assist
February 13, 2025	Jincy Roese	5th career PWHL assist
February 13, 2025	Ronja Savolainen	5th career PWHL assist
February 16, 2025	Tereza Vanišová	10th career PWHL goal
February 16, 2025	Jocelyne Larocque	15th career PWHL assist
February 22, 2025	Emily Clark	10th career PWHL goal
February 22, 2025	Stephanie Markowski	1st career PWHL goal
February 22, 2025	Mannon McMahon	1st career PWHL assist
February 26, 2025	Shiann Darkangelo	5th career PWHL goal
February 26, 2025	Taylor House	1st career PWHL goal
February 26, 2025	Stephanie Markowski	5th career PWHL assist
February 26, 2025	Danielle Serdachny	5th career PWHL assist
February 26, 2025	Anna Meixner	1st career PWHL penalty
March 15, 2025	Shiann Darkangelo	5th career PWHL assist
March 22, 2025	Tereza Vanišová	15th career PWHL goal
March 22, 2025	Tereza Vanišová	2nd career PWHL hat-trick
March 22, 2025	Jincy Roese	15th career PWHL assist
March 22, 2025	Gabbie Hughes	10th career PWHL assist
March 25, 2025	Tereza Vanišová	15th career PWHL assist
April 2, 2025	Shiann Darkangelo	1st career PWHL hat-trick
April 2, 2025	Aneta Tejralová	15th career PWHL assist
April 2, 2025	Taylor House	1st career PWHL assist
April 2, 2025	Anna Meixner	1st career PWHL assist
April 26, 2025	Brianne Jenner	15th career PWHL goal
April 26, 2025	Ashton Bell	5th career PWHL goal
April 26, 2025	Emily Clark	20th career PWHL assist
May 3, 2025	Shiann Darkangelo	10th career PWHL assist

Playoffs
Date	Player	Milestone
May 8, 2025	Brianne Jenner	1st career PWHL playoff goal
May 8, 2025	Ashton Bell	1st career PWHL playoff goal
May 8, 2025	Shiann Darkangelo	1st career PWHL playoff goal
May 8, 2025	Tereza Vanišová	1st career PWHL playoff assist
May 8, 2025	Aneta Tejralová	1st career PWHL playoff assist
May 8, 2025	Danielle Serdachny	1st career PWHL playoff assist
May 8, 2025	Jocelyne Larocque	1st career PWHL playoff assist
May 8, 2025	Emily Clark	1st career PWHL playoff assist
May 11, 2025	Aneta Tejralová	1st career PWHL playoff goal
May 11, 2025	Brianne Jenner	20th career PWHL assist
May 11, 2025	Brianne Jenner	1st career PWHL playoff assist
May 13, 2025	Mannon McMahon	5th career PWHL goal
May 13, 2025	Mannon McMahon	1st career PWHL playoff goal
May 13, 2025	Gabbie Hughes	15th career PWHL assist
May 13, 2025	Gabbie Hughes	1st career PWHL playoff assist
May 13, 2025	Ronja Savolainen	10th career PWHL assist
May 13, 2025	Ronja Savolainen	1st career PWHL playoff assist
May 16, 2025	Rebecca Leslie	5th career PWHL goal
May 16, 2025	Rebecca Leslie	1st career PWHL playoff goal
May 16, 2025	Emily Clark	1st career PWHL playoff goal
May 16, 2025	Anna Meixner	1st career PWHL playoff assist
May 20, 2025	Emily Clark	15th career PWHL goal
May 20, 2025	Tereza Vanišová	20th career PWHL assist
May 22, 2025	Jocelyne Larocque	1st career PWHL playoff goal
May 22, 2025	Rebecca Leslie	10th career PWHL assist
May 22, 2025	Rebecca Leslie	1st career PWHL playoff assist
May 24, 2025	Ashton Bell	1st career PWHL playoff assist
May 26, 2025	Tereza Vanišová	1st career PWHL playoff goal
May 26, 2025	Jocelyne Larocque	20th career PWHL assist

=== Honours ===
- December 30, 2024: Emerance Maschmeyer and Kateřina Mrázová were named PWHL First and Second Stars of the Week
- On January 2, 2025, Jincy Roese was named as a December SupraStar of the Month
- February 17, 2025: Gabbie Hughes earned First Star of the Week
- February 24, 2025: Emily Clark earned PWHL First Star of the Week
- On March 3, 2025, Emily Clark and Gabbie Hughes were named February SupraStars of the Month
- March 3, 2025: Gabbie Hughes earned PWHL Second Star of the Week
- March 24, 2025: Tereza Vanišová earned PWHL First Star of the Week
- March 31, 2025: Tereza Vanišová was named PWHL Second Star of the Week
- On April 3, 2025, Tereza Vanišová was named to the March SupraStars of the Month team
- April 7, 2025: Shiann Darkangelo and Gwyneth Philips earned PWHL First and Second Stars of the Week, respectively

== Transactions ==
Ottawa has been involved in the following transactions during the 2024–25 PWHL season.

=== Signings ===
Players the Ottawa Charge have signed
Date	Player	Position	Term	Previous team	Ref
June 5, 2024	Natalie Snodgrass	F	1 year	Ottawa Charge	
June 9, 2024	Aneta Tejralová	D	2 years	Ottawa Charge	
June 10, 2024	Zoe Boyd	D	1 year	Ottawa Charge	
June 20, 2024	Kateřina Mrázová	F	2 years	Ottawa Charge	
June 24, 2024	Rebecca Leslie	F	1 year	Toronto Sceptres	
June 25, 2024	Alexa Vasko	F	1 year	Toronto Sceptres	
June 25, 2024	Logan Angers	G	1 year	Quinnipiac Bobcats	
June 26, 2024	Shiann Darkangelo	F	1 year	Ottawa Charge	
June 27, 2024	Anna Meixner	F	1 year	Brynäs IF	
August 20, 2024	Danielle Serdachny	C	3 years	Colgate Raiders	
September 25, 2024	Ronja Savolainen	D	3 years	Luleå HF/MSSK	

=== Trades ===
Date	Details	
December 30, 2024	To Toronto Hayley Scamurra; Savannah Harmon	To Ottawa Victoria Bach; Jocelyne Larocque

== Draft picks ==
Below are PWHL Ottawa's selections at the 2024 PWHL Draft, which was held on June 10, 2024, at Roy Wilkins Auditorium in Saint Paul.

Ottawa Charge 2024 draft picks
Round	#	Player	Pos	Nationality	School/junior/club team	Reference
1	2	Danielle Serdachny	C	Canada	Colgate (ECAC)	
2	8	Ronja Savolainen	D	Finland	Luleå HF/MSSK (SDHL)	
3	14	Gwyneth Philips	G	United States	Northeastern (Hockey East)	
4	20	Stephanie Markowski	D	Canada	Ohio State (WCHA)	
5	26	Mannon McMahon	F	United States	Minnesota Duluth (WCHA)	
6	32	Anna Meixner	F	Austria	Brynäs IF (SDHL)	
7	38	Madeline Wethington	D	United States	Minnesota (WCHA)	
