= 2024–25 Boston Fleet season =

Professional Women's Hockey League season

2024–25 Boston Fleet
- League: 5 PWHL
- 2024–25 record: 9–6–5–10
- Home record: 6–4–1–5
- Road record: 3–2–4–5
- Goals for: 75
- Goals against: 76

Team information
- General manager: Danielle Marmer
- Coach: Courtney Kessel
- Assistant coach: Stefanie McKeough; Pernilla Winberg
- Captain: Hilary Knight
- Alternate captains: Megan Keller; Jamie Lee Rattray
- Arena: Tsongas Center
- Average attendance: 4,587

Team leaders
- Goals: Hilary Knight (15)
- Assists: Hilary Knight (14)
- Points: Hilary Knight (29)
- Penalty minutes: Sophie Shirley (29)
- Plus/minus: Jessica DiGirolamo (+8)
- Wins: Aerin Frankel (12)
- Goals against average: Klára Peslarová (1.79)

The 2024–25 Boston Fleet season was the team's second season as a member of the Professional Women's Hockey League (PWHL). They played their home games at the Tsongas Center in Lowell, Massachusetts.

== Standings ==
Pos	Team	Pld	W	OTW	OTL	L	GF	GA	GD	Pts	Qualification
1	Montreal Victoire (Y)	30	12	7	3	8	77	67	+10	53	Playoffs
2	Toronto Sceptres (X)	30	12	3	6	9	73	73	0	48	Playoffs
3	Ottawa Charge (X)	30	12	2	4	12	71	80	−9	44 (Note: Regulation wins: Ottawa 12, Minnesota 10, Boston 9)	Playoffs
4	Minnesota Frost (X)	30	10	5	4	11	85	76	+9	44	Playoffs
5	Boston Fleet (E)	30	9	6	5	10	75	76	−1	44	
6	New York Sirens (E)	30	8	4	5	13	71	80	−9	37	

Updated to match(es) played on May 3, 2025. Source: PWHL
(E) Eliminated; (X) Clinched playoff berth; (Y) Clinched first place

== Schedule and results ==
=== Preseason ===
The preseason schedule was published on October 1, 2024.

All times in Eastern Time.

Pre-season camp

Date	Time	Visitor	Score	Home	OT	Notes	Box Score/Recap
November 20	2:00	Montreal	1–3	Boston		@ Verdun Auditorium	
November 21	2:00	Boston	1–6	Ottawa		@ Verdun Auditorium	

=== Regular season ===
The regular season schedule was announced on October 15, 2024. The Fleet's regular season will begin on November 30, 2024, and will end on May 3, 2025, with each team playing 30 games; six games against every opponent.

Regular season schedule (Home: 6–4–1–5; Road: 3–2–4–5)
November: 0–0–0–1, 0 points (Home: 0–0–0–0; Road: 0–0–0–1)

Game	Date	Opponent	Score	OT	Decision	Location	Attendance	Record	Points	Recap
1	November 30	@ Toronto	1–3		Frankel	Coca-Cola Coliseum	8,089	0–0–0–1	0	

December: 2–0–0–3, 6 points (Home: 2–0–0–1; Road: 0–0–0–2)

Game	Date	Opponent	Score	OT	Decision	Location	Attendance	Record	Points	Recap
2	December 4	Minnesota	1–2		Frankel	Tsongas Center	3,811	0–0–0–2	0	
3	December 8	New York	4–2		Frankel	Tsongas Center	4,003	1–0–0–2	3	
4	December 17	Ottawa	3–2		Frankel	Tsongas Center	2,854	2–0–0–2	6	
5	December 27	@ Toronto	2–4		Frankel	Coca-Cola Coliseum	8,264	2–0–0–3	6	
6	December 30	@ Montreal	1–3		Söderberg	Place Bell	10,172	2–0–0–4	6	

January: 1–3–2–1, 11 points (Home: 1–2–0–0; Road: 0–1–2–1)

Game	Date	Opponent	Score	OT	Decision	Location	Attendance	Record	Points	Recap
7	January 2	@ Minnesota	3–4	OT	Frankel	Xcel Energy Center	5,066	2–0–1–4	7	
8	January 5	Montreal	3–2	SO	Frankel	Climate Pledge Arena	12,608	2–1–1–4	9	
9	January 8	@ Minnesota	1–2	OT	Söderberg	Xcel Energy Center	4,248	2–1–2–4	10	
10	January 11	@ Ottawa	2–1	OT	Frankel	TD Place Arena	8,295	2–2–2–4	12	
11	January 22	Toronto	4–1		Frankel	Tsongas Center	3,951	3–2–2–4	15	
12	January 26	@ Minnesota	2–5		Söderberg	Xcel Energy Center	7,838	3–2–2–5	15	
13	January 31	New York	3–2	SO	Frankel	Tsongas Center	5,912	3–3–2–5	17	

February: 3–2–0–1, 13 points (Home: 1–1–0–0; Road: 2–1–0–1)

Game	Date	Opponent	Score	OT	Decision	Location	Attendance	Record	Points	Recap
14	February 12	@ New York	4–0		Frankel	Prudential Center	1,729	4–3–2–5	20	
15	February 14	@ Toronto	1–3		Frankel	Coca-Cola Coliseum	8,124	4–3–2–6	20	
16	February 16	Minnesota	4–2		Peslarová	Tsongas Center	6,032	5–3–2–6	23	
17	February 17	@ New York	4–1		Frankel	Prudential Center	3,715	6–3–2–6	26	
18	February 20	@ Ottawa	3–2	OT	Frankel	TD Place Arena	5,458	6–4–2–6	28	
19	February 23	New York	3–2	SO	Frankel	KeyBank Center	8,512	6–5–2–6	30	

March: 2–1–2–2, 10 points (Home: 1–1–1–2; Road: 1–0–1–0)

Game	Date	Opponent	Score	OT	Decision	Location	Attendance	Record	Points	Recap
20	March 1	@ Montreal	2–3	OT	Frankel	Bell Centre	17,324	6–5–3–6	31	
21	March 5	New York	5–2		Frankel	Tsongas Center	3,252	7–5–3–6	34	
22	March 8	Montreal	2–3	OT	Frankel	Agganis Arena	5,968	7–5–4–6	35	
23	March 15	@ Ottawa	5–2		Frankel	TD Place Arena	8,096	8–5–4–6	38	
24	March 18	Montreal	3–2	SO	Söderberg	Tsongas Center	3,375	8–6–4–6	40	
25	March 26	Toronto	2–4		Frankel	Agganis Arena	6,028	8–6–4–7	40	
26	March 29	Ottawa	1–2		Philips	Enterprise Center	8,578	8–6–4–8	40	

April: 1–0–1–1, 4 points (Home: 1–0–0–1; Road: 0–0–1–0)

Game	Date	Opponent	Score	OT	Decision	Location	Attendance	Record	Points	Recap
27	April 2	Ottawa	0–4		Frankel	Tsongas Center	3,807	8–6–4–9	40	
28	April 26	Toronto	3–0		Peslarová	Tsongas Center	5,619	9–6–4–9	43	
29	April 28	@ Montreal	2–3	OT	Peslarová	Place Bell	8,812	9–6–5–9	44	

May: 0–0–0–1, 0 points (Home: 0–0–0–1; Road: 0–0–0–0)

Game	Date	Opponent	Score	OT	Decision	Location	Attendance	Record	Points	Recap
30	May 3	Minnesota	1–8		Frankel	Tsongas Center	5,013	9–6–5–10	44	

Regulation Win (3 points) Overtime/Shootout win (2 points) Overtime/shootout loss (1 point) Regulation Loss (0 points)

== Player statistics ==
As of May 03, 2025

=== Skaters ===
Regular season
Player	GP	G	A	Pts	SOG	+/−	PIM
Hilary Knight	30	15	14	29	111	0	12
Alina Müller	26	7	12	19	51	+1	8
Susanna Tapani	30	11	7	18	56	–4	10
Megan Keller	30	5	8	13	50	–5	18
Hannah Bilka	16	5	6	11	36	–4	6
Hannah Brandt	30	3	8	11	30	+5	14
Jamie Lee Rattray	30	4	6	10	40	+1	8
Shay Maloney	30	3	6	9	52	+1	8
Sidney Morin	30	3	5	8	50	0	10
Lexie Adzija	29	2	4	6	33	–5	6
Amanda Pelkey	25	3	2	5	27	–3	10
Theresa Schafzahl	30	3	2	5	30	+1	6
Jill Saulnier	19	2	3	5	16	–2	8
Jessica DiGirolamo	30	1	4	5	32	+8	12
Sophie Shirley	28	0	5	5	25	+1	29
Emily Brown	29	1	3	4	24	+3	16
Loren Gabel	20	2	1	3	19	–1	4
Sydney Bard	27	1	2	3	19	–5	14
Emma Greco	28	0	3	3	20	+3	8
Daniela Pejšová	28	0	3	3	18	–1	8
Jillian Dempsey	9	0	2	2	4	+3	0
Hadley Hartmetz	2	0	0	0	0	0	0
Kelly Babstock	9	0	0	0	7	–1	9

=== Goaltenders ===
Regular season
Player	GP	TOI	W	L	OT	SOL	GA	GAA	SA	SV%	SO	G	A	PIM
Aerin Frankel	23	1342:18	12	8	3	0	51	2.28	642	0.921	1	0	0	0
Emma Söderberg	6	284:52	1	2	1	0	15	3.16	129	0.884	0	0	0	0
Klára Peslarová	4	200:47	2	0	1	0	6	1.79	95	0.937	1	0	0	0

== Awards and honors ==
=== Milestones ===
Regular season
Date	Player	Milestone
November 30, 2024	Hannah Bilka	1st career PWHL assist
November 30, 2024	Hannah Bilka	1st career PWHL game
November 30, 2024	Sydney Bard	1st career PWHL game
November 30, 2024	Shay Maloney	1st career PWHL game
December 4, 2024	Daniela Pejšová	1st career PWHL penalty
December 4, 2024	Daniela Pejšová	1st career PWHL game
December 8, 2024	Megan Keller	5th career PWHL goal
December 8, 2024	Sydney Bard	1st career PWHL goal
December 8, 2024	Sydney Bard	1st career PWHL penalty
December 8, 2024	Shay Maloney	1st career PWHL assist
December 17, 2024	Shay Maloney	1st career PWHL goal
December 17, 2024	Emma Greco	1st career PWHL assist
December 27, 2024	Loren Gabel	5th career PWHL goal
December 27, 2024	Hannah Bilka	1st career PWHL goal
December 30, 2024	Hannah Bilka	1st career PWHL penalty
January 2, 2025	Hilary Knight	10th career PWHL goal
January 2, 2025	Susanna Tapani	10th career PWHL goal
January 2, 2025	Daniela Pejšová	1st career PWHL assist
January 5, 2025	Megan Keller	20th career PWHL assist
January 22, 2025	Alina Müller	15th career PWHL assist
January 22, 2025	Hannah Brandt	10th career PWHL assist
January 22, 2025	Theresa Schafzahl	1st career PWHL penalty
January 26, 2025	Hilary Knight	10th career PWHL assist
January 26, 2025	Hannah Bilka	5th career PWHL assist
January 26, 2025	Jessica DiGirolamo	5th career PWHL assist
January 31, 2025	Shay Maloney	1st career PWHL penalty
February 12, 2025	Jamie Lee Rattray	5th career PWHL goal
February 12, 2025	Jamie Lee Rattray	10th career PWHL assist
February 12, 2025	Sophie Shirley	5th career PWHL assist
February 16, 2025	Alina Müller	10th career PWHL goal
February 16, 2025	Klára Peslarová	1st career PWHL game
February 16, 2025	Klára Peslarová	1st career PWHL win
February 20, 2025	Susanna Tapani	15th career PWHL goal
February 23, 2025	Alina Müller	20th career PWHL assist
March 1, 2025	Amanda Pelkey	5th career PWHL goal
March 5, 2025	Hilary Knight	1st career PWHL hat-trick
March 5, 2025	Hilary Knight	15th career PWHL goal
March 5, 2025	Shay Maloney	5th career PWHL assist
March 15, 2025	Theresa Schafzahl	5th career PWHL goal
March 18, 2025	Susanna Tapani	15th career PWHL assist
March 18, 2025	Hadley Hartmetz	1st career PWHL game
March 26, 2025	Hilary Knight	20th career PWHL goal
April 28, 2025	Hannah Bilka	5th career PWHL goal
April 28, 2025	Jamie Lee Rattray	15th career PWHL assist
April 28, 2025	Sidney Morin	10th career PWHL assist
May 3, 2025	Jessica DiGirolamo	1st career PWHL goal

=== Honors ===
- January 6, 2025: Susanna Tapani, Megan Keller, and Hilary Knight swept the PWHL Three Stars of the Week.
- January 13, 2025: Sidney Morin earned the PWHL Third Star of the Week
- January 27, 2025: Alina Müller earned PWHL First Star of the Week
- On March 3, 2025, Aerin Frankel was named the goaltender for the February SupraStars of the Month team
- March 10, 2025: Hilary Knight earned PWHL First Star of the Week
- March 17, 2025: Hilary Knight again earned PWHL First Star of the Week
- March 24, 2025: Susanna Tapani earned PWHL Third Star of the Week
- On April 3, 2025, Hilary Knight was honored as a forward on the March SupraStars of the Month team

== Transactions ==
Boston has been involved in the following transactions during the 2024–25 PWHL season.

=== Signings ===
Players the Boston Fleet have signed
Date	Player	Position	Term	Previous team	Ref
June 20, 2024	Hannah Brandt	F	2 years	Boston Fleet	
June 20, 2024	Sophie Shirley	F	2 years	Boston Fleet	
June 20, 2024	Emily Brown	D	2 years	Boston Fleet	
June 20, 2024	Sidney Morin	D	1 year	Boston Fleet	
June 21, 2024	Lexie Adzija	F	1 year	Boston Fleet	
July 8, 2024	Sydney Bard	D	2 years	Colgate	
July 9, 2024	Hannah Bilka	F	3 years	Ohio State	
July 9, 2024	Emma Greco	D	1 year	Minnesota Frost	
July 18, 2024	Daniela Pejšová	D	3 years	Luleå HF/MSSK	
November 15, 2024	Hadley Hartmetz	D	1 year	Ohio State	

== Draft picks ==
Below are PWHL Boston's selections at the 2024 PWHL Draft, which was held on June 10, 2024, at Roy Wilkins Auditorium in Saint Paul.

Boston Fleet 2024 draft picks
Round	#	Player	Pos	Nationality	College/junior/club team
1	4	Hannah Bilka	F	United States	Ohio State Buckeyes (WCHA)
2	7	Daniela Pejšová	D	Czech Republic	Luleå HF/MSSK (SDHL)
4	22	Sydney Bard	D	United States	Colgate Raiders (ECAC)
6	34	Shay Maloney	F	United States	Leksands IF (SDHL)
7	37	Ilona Markova	F	Russia	Agidel Ufa (ZhHL)
7	40	Hadley Hartmetz	D	United States	Ohio State Buckeyes (WCHA)
