= 2024–25 Montreal Victoire season =

Professional Women's Hockey League season

2024–25 Montreal Victoire
- League: 1 PWHL
- 2024–25 record: 12–7–3–8
- Home record: 6–5–0–4
- Road record: 6–2–3–4
- Goals for: 77
- Goals against: 67

Team information
- General manager: Danièle Sauvageau
- Coach: Kori Cheverie
- Assistant coach: Éric Houde; Alexandre Imbeault; Noémie Marin; Caroline Ouellette; Alexandre Tremblay
- Captain: Marie-Philip Poulin
- Alternate captains: Erin Ambrose; Laura Stacey; Kristin O'Neill
- Arena: Place Bell
- Average attendance: 9,013

Team leaders
- Goals: Marie-Philip Poulin (19)
- Assists: Erin Ambrose; Jennifer Gardiner (13)
- Points: Marie-Philip Poulin (26)
- Penalty minutes: Catherine Dubois (27)
- Plus/minus: Marie-Philip Poulin (+17)
- Wins: Ann-Renée Desbiens (15)
- Goals against average: Ann-Renée Desbiens (1.86)

The 2024–25 Montreal Victoire season was the team's second season as a member of the Professional Women's Hockey League. They played their home games at Place Bell in the suburb of Laval.

== Standings ==
Pos	Team	Pld	W	OTW	OTL	L	GF	GA	GD	Pts	Qualification
1	Montreal Victoire (Y)	30	12	7	3	8	77	67	+10	53	Playoffs
2	Toronto Sceptres (X)	30	12	3	6	9	73	73	0	48	Playoffs
3	Ottawa Charge (X)	30	12	2	4	12	71	80	−9	44 (Note: Regulation wins: Ottawa 12, Minnesota 10, Boston 9)	Playoffs
4	Minnesota Frost (X)	30	10	5	4	11	85	76	+9	44	Playoffs
5	Boston Fleet (E)	30	9	6	5	10	75	76	−1	44	
6	New York Sirens (E)	30	8	4	5	13	71	80	−9	37	

Updated to match(es) played on May 3, 2025. Source: PWHL
(E) Eliminated; (X) Clinched playoff berth; (Y) Clinched first place

== Schedule and results ==
=== Preseason ===
The preseason schedule was published on October 1, 2024.

All times in Eastern Time.

Pre-season camp

Date	Time	Visitor	Score	Home	OT	Notes	Box Score/Recap
November 20	2:00	Montreal	1–3	Boston		@ Verdun Auditorium	
November 22	2:00	Ottawa	3–6	Montreal		@ Verdun Auditorium	

=== Regular season ===
The regular season schedule was announced on October 15, 2024. The Victoire's regular season will begin on November 30, 2024, and will end on May 2, 2025, with each team playing 30 games; six games against every opponent.

Regular season schedule (Home: 6–5–0–4; Road: 6–2–3–4)
November: 0–1–0–0, 2 points (Home: 0–1–0–0; Road: 0–0–0–0)

Game	Date	Opponent	Score	OT	Decision	Location	Attendance	Record	Points	Recap
1	November 30	Ottawa	4–3	SO	Desbiens	Place Bell	10,033	0–1–0–0	2	

December: 3–1–0–1, 11 points (Home: 1–0–0–1; Road: 2–1–0–0)

Game	Date	Opponent	Score	OT	Decision	Location	Attendance	Record	Points	Recap
2	December 4	New York	1–4		Desbiens	Place Bell	5,415	0–1–0–1	2	
3	December 6	@ Ottawa	2–1		Chuli	Canadian Tire Centre	11,065	1–1–0–1	5	
4	December 21	@ Toronto	4–3	OT	Chuli	Coca-Cola Coliseum	8,251	1–2–0–1	7	
5	December 28	@ Minnesota	3–2		Desbiens	Xcel Energy Center	8,726	2–2–0–1	10	
6	December 30	Boston	3–1		Desbiens	Place Bell	10,172	3–2–0–1	13	

January: 4–1–1–1, 15 points (Home: 3–1–0–0; Road: 1–0–1–1)

Game	Date	Opponent	Score	OT	Decision	Location	Attendance	Record	Points	Recap
7	January 5	@ Boston	2–3	SO	Desbiens	Climate Pledge Arena	12,608	3–2–1–1	14	
8	January 8	@ Toronto	4–2		Desbiens	Rogers Arena	19,038	4–2–1–1	17	
9	January 12	@ Minnesota	2–4		Chuli	Ball Arena	14,108	4–2–1–2	17	
10	January 17	Minnesota	4–2		Desbiens	Place Bell	10,172	5–2–1–2	20	
11	January 19	Ottawa	2–1		Desbiens	Videotron Centre	18,259	6–2–1–2	23	
12	January 29	Ottawa	4–1		Desbiens	Place Bell	6,150	7–2–1–2	26	
13	January 30	Toronto	4–3	SO	Chuli	Place Bell	7,242	7–3–1–2	28	

February: 3–0–0–2, 9 points (Home: 2–0–0–1; Road: 1–0–0–1)

Game	Date	Opponent	Score	OT	Decision	Location	Attendance	Record	Points	Recap
14	February 2	@ New York	2–1		Desbiens	Prudential Center	4,346	8–3–1–2	31	
15	February 15	New York	6–2		Desbiens	Place Bell	10,172	9–3–1–2	34	
16	February 18	Minnesota	0–4		Chuli	Place Bell	6,696	9–3–1–3	34	
17	February 22	@ Ottawa	1–3		Desbiens	TD Place Arena	8,424	9–3–1–4	34	
18	February 25	Toronto	3–1		Desbiens	Place Bell	6,101	10–3–1–4	37	

March: 1–3–2–2, 11 points (Home: 0–2–0–1; Road: 1–1–2–1)

Game	Date	Opponent	Score	OT	Decision	Location	Attendance	Record	Points	Recap
19	March 1	Boston	3–2	OT	Desbiens	Bell Centre	17,324	10–4–1–4	39	
20	March 4	Minnesota	2–1	SO	Desbiens	Place Bell	8,923	10–5–1–4	41	
21	March 6	@ Toronto	1–4		Chuli	Coca-Cola Coliseum	8,618	10–5–1–5	41	
22	March 8	@ Boston	3–2	OT	Desbiens	Agganis Arena	5,968	43	10–6–1–5	
23	March 12	@ New York	2–3	OT	Desbiens	Prudential Center	1,944	10–6–2–5	44	
24	March 18	@ Boston	2–3	SO	Chuli	Tsongas Center	3,375	10–6–3–5	45	
25	March 23	Toronto	1–2		Chuli	Place Bell	10,172	10–6–3–6	45	
26	March 26	@ Minnesota	4–1		Chuli	Xcel Energy Center	6,330	11–6–3–6	48	

April: 0–1–0–2, 2 points (Home: 0–1–0–1; Road: 0–0–0–1)

Game	Date	Opponent	Score	OT	Decision	Location	Attendance	Record	Points	Recap
27	April 1	New York	0–1		Chuli	Place Bell	8,798	11–6–3–7	48	
28	April 26	@ Ottawa	2–3		Chuli	TD Place Arena	8,576	11–6–3–8	48	
29	April 28	Boston	3–2	OT	Desbiens	Place Bell	8,812	11–7–3–8	50	

May: 1–0–0–0, 3 points (Home: 0–0–0–0; Road: 1–0–0–0)

Game	Date	Opponent	Score	OT	Decision	Location	Attendance	Record	Points	Recap
30	May 3	@ New York	3–2		Desbiens	Prudential Center	2,737	12–7–3–8	53	

Regulation Win (3 points) Overtime/Shootout win (2 points) Overtime/shootout loss (1 point) Regulation Loss (0 points)

=== Playoffs ===
Montreal clinched first place in the league on the last day of the regular season. On May 4, they announced their choice to play the third-place Ottawa Charge in the first round.

2025 PWHL playoffs
First round vs. Ottawa Charge: Ottawa won 3–1

Game	Date	Opponent	Score	OT	Decision	Location	Attendance	Series	Recap
1	May 8	Ottawa	2–3		Desbiens	Place Bell	6,570	0–1	
2	May 11	Ottawa	3–2	4OT	Desbiens	Place Bell	7,114	1–1	
3	May 13	@ Ottawa	0–1		Desbiens	TD Place Arena	7,282	1–2	
4	May 16	@ Ottawa	1–2		Desbiens	TD Place Arena	8,011	1–3	

== Player statistics ==
As of May 16, 2025

=== Skaters ===
Regular season
Player	GP	G	A	Pts	SOG	+/−	PIM
Marie-Philip Poulin	30	19	7	26	98	+17	21
Laura Stacey	27	11	11	22	112	+12	6
Jennifer Gardiner	30	5	13	18	55	+10	2
Abigail Boreen	30	6	8	14	51	–9	12
Cayla Barnes	30	2	11	13	45	–1	12
Erin Ambrose	28	0	13	13	41	+10	4
Catherine Dubois	24	6	3	9	32	–1	27
Claire Dalton	30	3	6	9	45	+2	4
Anna Wilgren	30	3	6	9	25	+7	8
Kati Tabin	28	4	4	8	39	+3	23
Mikyla Grant-Mentis	30	3	5	8	43	+4	18
Maureen Murphy	28	3	3	6	34	–5	10
Lina Ljungblom	29	3	3	6	45	–3	8
Amanda Boulier	25	1	5	6	17	0	4
Kristin O'Neill	30	1	4	5	35	–12	24
Mariah Keopple	29	3	1	4	22	+1	14
Alexandra Labelle	19	1	3	4	29	+4	2
Dara Greig	29	0	3	3	14	–2	16
Clair DeGeorge	26	0	2	2	12	+4	4
Kaitlin Willoughby	7	0	1	1	6	0	0
Catherine Daoust	1	0	0	0	0	0	0
Gabrielle David	3	0	0	0	2	–1	0
Kelly-Ann Nadeau	4	0	0	0	1	–1	0
Dominika Lásková	5	0	0	0	1	–1	2

Playoffs
Player	GP	G	A	Pts	SOG	+/−	PIM
Jennifer Gardiner	4	0	3	3	6	–2	0
Anna Wilgren	4	0	3	3	5	–3	0
Maureen Murphy	4	2	0	2	8	0	2
Kristin O'Neill	4	1	1	2	7	+1	2
Marie-Philip Poulin	4	1	1	2	27	–2	2
Catherine Dubois	4	1	0	1	14	+1	0
Laura Stacey	4	1	0	1	28	–3	2
Erin Ambrose	4	0	1	1	4	+1	0
Kati Tabin	4	0	1	1	6	+1	4
Kaitlin Willoughby	4	0	1	1	8	+1	0
Clair DeGeorge	1	0	0	0	0	0	0
Claire Dalton	3	0	0	0	1	–1	0
Cayla Barnes	4	0	0	0	5	–3	0
Abigail Boreen	4	0	0	0	3	–1	0
Amanda Boulier	4	0	0	0	1	–1	0
Mikyla Grant-Mentis	4	0	0	0	4	–1	0
Dara Greig	4	0	0	0	0	0	0
Mariah Keopple	4	0	0	0	1	–1	4
Alexandra Labelle	4	0	0	0	1	–1	0
Lina Ljungblom	4	0	0	0	6	–1	0

=== Goaltenders ===
Regular season
Player	GP	TOI	W	L	OT	SOL	GA	GAA	SA	SV%	SO	G	A	PIM
Ann-Renée Desbiens	21	1228:17	15	2	1	1	38	1.86	556	0.932	0	0	0	6
Elaine Chuli	11	595:07	4	6	0	1	24	2.42	268	0.910	0	0	0	0

Playoffs
Player	GP	TOI	W	L	OT	SOL	GA	GAA	SA	SV%	SO	G	A	PIM
Ann-Renée Desbiens	4	310:38	1	3	0	0	8	1.55	140	0.943	0	0	0	0

== Awards and honours ==
=== Milestones ===
Regular season
Date	Player	Milestone
November 30, 2024	Jennifer Gardiner	1st career PWHL goal
November 30, 2024	Jennifer Gardiner	1st career PWHL game
November 30, 2024	Cayla Barnes	1st career PWHL assist
November 30, 2024	Cayla Barnes	1st career PWHL game
November 30, 2024	Abby Boreen	5th career PWHL goal
November 30, 2024	Anna Wilgren	1st career PWHL game
November 30, 2024	Dara Greig	1st career PWHL game
November 30, 2024	Lina Ljungblom	1st career PWHL game
November 30, 2024	Anna Kjellbin	1st career PWHL game
December 4, 2024	Cayla Barnes	1st career PWHL goal
December 4, 2024	Jennifer Gardiner	1st career PWHL assist
December 6, 2024	Claire Dalton	5th career PWHL assist
December 6, 2024	Mikyla Grant-Mentis	5th career PWHL assist
December 6, 2024	Dara Greig	1st career PWHL penalty
December 21, 2024	Marie-Philip Poulin	15th career PWHL assist
December 21, 2024	Catherine Dubois	5th career PWHL assist
December 21, 2024	Lina Ljungblom	1st career PWHL goal
December 21, 2024	Anna Kjellbin	1st career PWHL assist
December 21, 2024	Jennifer Gardiner	1st career PWHL penalty
December 28, 2024	Laura Stacey	10th career PWHL assist
December 28, 2024	Mariah Keopple	1st career PWHL goal
December 30, 2024	Anna Wilgren	1st career PWHL goal
January 5, 2025	Anna Wilgren	1st career PWHL penalty
January 8, 2025	Marie-Philip Poulin	15th career PWHL goal
January 8, 2025	Anna Wilgren	1st career PWHL assist
January 12, 2025	Dara Greig	1st career PWHL assist
January 17, 2025	Erin Ambrose	20th career PWHL assist
January 17, 2025	Alexandra Labelle	5th career PWHL assist
January 17, 2025	Cayla Barnes	1st career PWHL penalty
January 19, 2025	Abby Boreen	5th career PWHL assist
January 29, 2025	Amanda Boulier	10th career PWHL assist
January 29, 2025	Cayla Barnes	5th career PWHL assist
January 29, 2025	Jennifer Gardiner	5th career PWHL assist
January 30, 2025	Lina Ljungblom	1st career PWHL assist
February 2, 2025	Marie-Philip Poulin	20th career PWHL goal
February 15, 2025	Abby Boreen	10th career PWHL goal
February 15, 2025	Mikyla Grant-Mentis	5th career PWHL goal
February 15, 2025	Kelly-Ann Nadeau	1st career PWHL game
February 22, 2025	Laura Stacey	15th career PWHL goal
March 1, 2025	Jennifer Gardiner	10th career PWHL assist
March 6, 2025	Laura Stacey	15th career PWHL assist
March 8, 2025	Catherine Dubois	5th career PWHL goal
March 8, 2025	Claire Dalton	10th career PWHL assist
March 8, 2025	Anna Wilgren	5th career PWHL assist
March 12, 2025	Kati Tabin	5th career PWHL goal
March 23, 2025	Cayla Barnes	10th career PWHL assist
March 26, 2026	Laura Stacey	20th career PWHL goal
March 26, 2026	Marie-Philip Poulin	20th career PWHL assist
April 26, 2025	Laura Stacey	20th career PWHL assist
April 28, 2025	Jennifer Gardiner	5th career PWHL goal
April 28, 2025	Maureen Murphy	15th career PWHL assist
April 28, 2025	Abby Boreen	10th career PWHL assist
May 3, 2025	Marie-Philip Poulin	30th career PWHL goal

Regular season
Date	Player	Milestone
May 8, 2025	Jennifer Gardiner	1st career PWHL playoff assist
May 8, 2025	Kati Tabin	1st career PWHL playoff assist
May 8, 2025	Anna Wilren	1st career PWHL playoff assist
May 8, 2025	Mariah Keopple	1st career PWHL playoff penalty
May 8, 2025	Kati Tabin	1st career PWHL playoff penalty
May 11, 2025	Laura Stacey	1st career PWHL playoff goal
May 11, 2025	Catherine Dubois	1st career PWHL playoff goal
May 11, 2025	Kristin O'Neill	1st career PWHL playoff assist
May 11, 2025	Kaitlyn Willoughby	1st career PWHL playoff assist
May 13, 2025	Marie-Philip Poulin	1st career PWHL playoff penalty
May 13, 2025	Laura Stacey	1st career PWHL playoff penalty
May 16, 2025	Kristin O'Neill	1st career PWHL playoff penalty

=== Honors ===
- December 2, 2024: Marie-Philip Poulin and Abby Boreen were named the Second and Third Stars of the Week
- December 23, 2024: Abby Boreen earned Second Star of the Week
- December 30, 2024: Marie-Philip Poulin was named Third Star of the Week
- January 13, 2025: Marie-Philip Poulin was named PWHL First Star of the Week
- January 20, 2025: Abby Boreen earned another PWHL Second Star of the Week
- On February 3, 2025, Marie-Philip Poulin and Erin Ambrose were named as January SupraStars of the Month
- February 3, 2025: Marie-Philip Poulin and Ann-Renée Desbiens earned PWHL First and Third Stars of the Week, respectively
- March 3, 2025: Laura Stacey and Kati Tabin earned PWHL First and Third Stars of the Week, respectively
- March 10, 2025: Laura Stacey was named PWHL Second Star of the Week
- March 31, 2025: Laura Stacey again earned PWHL First Star of the Week
- On April 3, 2025, Laura Stacey was honored as a forward on the SupraStars of the Month team for March

== Transactions ==
Montreal has been involved in the following transactions during the 2024–25 PWHL season.

=== Signings ===
Players the Montreal Victoire have signed
Date	Player	Position	Term	Previous team	Ref
June 10, 2024	Lina Ljungblom	F	3 years	MoDo Hockey	
June 17, 2024	Amanda Boulier	D	2 years	Montreal	
June 17, 2024	Elaine Chuli	G	1 year	Montreal	
June 17, 2024	Mariah Keopple	D	1 year	Montreal	
June 21, 2024	Cayla Barnes	D	3 years	Ohio State	
June 28, 2024	Mikyla Grant-Mentis	F	1 year	Montreal	
July 15, 2024	Catherine Dubois	F	1 year	Montreal	
October 18, 2024	Abigail Boreen	F	3 years	Minnesota	

== Draft picks ==
Below are PWHL Montreal's selections at the 2024 PWHL Draft, which was held on June 10, 2024, at Roy Wilkins Auditorium in Saint Paul.

Montreal Victoire 2024 draft picks
Round	#	Player	Pos	Nationality	College/junior/club team
1	5	Cayla Barnes	D	United States	Ohio State Buckeyes (WCHA)
2	11	Jennifer Gardiner	F	Canada	Ohio State Buckeyes (WCHA)
3	17	Abigail Boreen	F	United States	Minnesota (PWHL)
4	23	Dara Greig	F	Canada	Colgate Raiders (ECAC)
5	29	Anna Wilgren	D	United States	Wisconsin Badgers (WCHA)
6	35	Anna Kjellbin	D	Sweden	Luleå HF/MSSK (SDHL)
7	41	Amanda Kessel	F	United States	Did not play
