= 2024–25 Toronto Sceptres season =

Professional Women's Hockey League season

2024–25 Toronto Sceptres
- League: 2 PWHL
- 2024–25 record: 12–3–6–9
- Home record: 7–2–3–3
- Road record: 5–1–3–6
- Goals for: 73
- Goals against: 73

Team information
- General manager: Gina Kingsbury
- Coach: Troy Ryan
- Assistant coach: Rachel Flanagan; Jim Midgley
- Captain: Blayre Turnbull
- Alternate captains: Renata Fast; Jocelyne Larocque
- Arena: Coca-Cola Coliseum
- Average attendance: 9,059

Team leaders
- Goals: Daryl Watts (12)
- Assists: Renata Fast (16)
- Points: Daryl Watts (27)
- Penalty minutes: Renata Fast (36)
- Plus/minus: Hannah Miller (+14)
- Wins: Kristen Campbell (9)
- Goals against average: Carly Jackson (0.93)

The 2024–25 Toronto Sceptres season was the team's second season as a member of the Professional Women's Hockey League (PWHL). They played their home games at Coca-Cola Coliseum in Toronto.

== Standings ==
Pos	Team	Pld	W	OTW	OTL	L	GF	GA	GD	Pts	Qualification
1	Montreal Victoire (Y)	30	12	7	3	8	77	67	+10	53	Playoffs
2	Toronto Sceptres (X)	30	12	3	6	9	73	73	0	48	Playoffs
3	Ottawa Charge (X)	30	12	2	4	12	71	80	−9	44 (Note: Regulation wins: Ottawa 12, Minnesota 10, Boston 9)	Playoffs
4	Minnesota Frost (X)	30	10	5	4	11	85	76	+9	44	Playoffs
5	Boston Fleet (E)	30	9	6	5	10	75	76	−1	44	
6	New York Sirens (E)	30	8	4	5	13	71	80	−9	37	

Updated to match(es) played on May 3, 2025. Source: PWHL
(E) Eliminated; (X) Clinched playoff berth; (Y) Clinched first place

== Schedule and results ==
=== Preseason ===
The preseason schedule was published on October 1, 2024.

All times in Eastern Time.

Pre-season camp

Date	Time	Visitor	Score	Home	OT	Notes	Box Score/Recap
November 20	2:15	Toronto	1–3	Minnesota		@ Ford Performance Centre	
November 22	2:30	New York	5–2	Toronto		@ Ford Performance Centre	

=== Regular season ===
The regular season schedule was announced on October 15, 2024. The Sceptres' regular season will begin on November 30, 2024, and will end on May 3, 2025, with each team playing 30 games; six games against every opponent.

Regular season schedule (Home: 7–2–3–3; Road: 5–1–3–6)
November: 1–0–0–0, 3 points (Home: 1–0–0–0; Road: 0–0–0–0)

Game	Date	Opponent	Score	OT	Decision	Location	Attendance	Record	Points	Box Score/Recap
1	November 30	Boston	3–1		Campbell	Coca-Cola Coliseum	8,089	1–0–0–0	3	

December: 1–0–1–4, 4 points (Home: 1–0–1–2; Road: 0–0–0–2)

Game	Date	Opponent	Score	OT	Decision	Location	Attendance	Record	Points	Box Score/Recap
2	December 3	@ Ottawa	2–3		Campbell	TD Place Arena	6,451	1–0–0–1	3	
3	December 7	Minnesota	3–6		Campbell	Coca-Cola Coliseum	7,584	1–0–0–2	3	
4	December 18	@ New York	2–4		Campbell	Prudential Center	2,851	1–0–0–3	3	
5	December 21	Montreal	3–4	OT	Kirk	Coca-Cola Coliseum	8,251	1–0–1–3	4	
6	December 27	Boston	4–2		Kirk	Coca-Cola Coliseum	8,264	2–0–1–3	7	
7	December 31	Ottawa	1–2		Kirk	Coca-Cola Coliseum	8,278	2–0–1–4	7	

January: 2–0–3–2, 9 points (Home: 1–0–0–1; Road: 1–0–3–1)

Game	Date	Opponent	Score	OT	Decision	Location	Attendance	Record	Points	Box Score/Recap
8	January 8	Montreal	2–4		Campbell	Rogers Arena	19,038	2–0–1–5	7	
9	January 12	@ New York	0–1	OT	Campbell	Prudential Center	3,258	2–0–2–5	8	
10	January 14	@ Ottawa	4–2		Campbell	TD Place Arena	6,526	3–0–2–5	11	
11	January 22	@ Boston	1–4		Campbell	Tsongas Center	3,951	3–0–2–6	11	
12	January 25	New York	4–2		Kirk	Scotiabank Arena	19,102	4–0–2–6	14	
13	January 28	@ Minnesota	3–4	SO	Kirk	Xcel Energy Center	4,540	4–0–3–6	15	
14	January 30	@ Montreal	3–4	SO	Campbell	Place Bell	7,242	4–0–4–6	16	

February: 4–2–0–1, 16 points (Home: 2–1–0–0; Road: 2–1–0–1)

Game	Date	Opponent	Score	OT	Decision	Location	Attendance	Record	Points	Box Score/Recap
15	February 1	Ottawa	4–2		Kirk	Coca-Cola Coliseum	8,351	5–0–4–6	19	
16	February 11	Minnesota	3–2	OT	Kirk	Coca-Cola Coliseum	8,183	5–1–4–6	21	
17	February 14	Boston	3–1		Campbell	Coca-Cola Coliseum	8,124	6–1–4–6	24	
18	February 16	@ Ottawa	3–2	OT	Kirk	Rogers Place	17,518	6–2–4–6	26	
19	February 19	@ New York	4–1		Campbell	Prudential Center	1,569	7–2–4–6	29	
20	February 23	@ Minnesota	2–1		Campbell	Xcel Energy Center	8,770	8–2–4–6	32	
21	February 25	@ Montreal	1–3		Campbell	Place Bell	6,101	8–2–4–7	32	

March: 4–0–1–1, 13 points (Home: 2–0–1–0; Road: 2–0–0–1)

Game	Date	Opponent	Score	OT	Decision	Location	Attendance	Record	Points	Box Score/Recap
22	March 6	Montreal	4–1		Campbell	Coca-Cola Coliseum	8,618	9–2–4–7	35	
23	March 9	Minnesota	1–2	OT	Campbell	Coca-Cola Coliseum	8,510	9–2–5–7	36	
24	March 19	New York	2–1		Campbell	Coca-Cola Coliseum	8,351	10–2–5–7	39	
25	March 23	@ Montreal	2–1		Campbell	Place Bell	10,172	11–2–5–7	42	
26	March 26	@ Boston	4–2		Campbell	Agganis Arena	6,028	12–2–5–7	45	
27	March 30	Minnesota	2–5		Campbell	Xcel Energy Center	9,536	12–2–5–8	45	

April: 0–1–0–1, 2 points (Home: 0–1–0–0; Road: 0–0–0–1)

Game	Date	Opponent	Score	OT	Decision	Location	Attendance	Record	Points	Box Score/Recap
28	April 26	@ Boston	0–3		Campbell	Tsongas Center	5,619	12–2–5–9	45	
29	April 29	New York	2–1	SO	Jackson	Coca-Cola Coliseum	8,532	12–3–5–9	47	

May: 0–0–1–0, 1 points (Home: 0–0–1–0; Road: 0–0–0–0)

Game	Date	Opponent	Score	OT	Decision	Location	Attendance	Record	Points	Box Score/Recap
30	May 3	Ottawa	1–2	OT	Campbell	Coca-Cola Coliseum	8,593	12–3–6–9	48	

Regulation Win (3 points) Overtime/Shootout win (2 points) Overtime/shootout loss (1 point) Regulation Loss (0 points)

=== Playoffs ===
On May 4, the first-place Montreal Victoire announced that they chose to play the third-place Ottawa Charge in the first round. This decision meant that second-place Toronto would play the fourth-place Minnesota Frost in a re-match of last year's semi-finals.

2025 PWHL Playoffs
First round vs. Minnesota Frost; Minnesota won 3–1

Game	Date	Opponent	Score	OT	Decision	Location	Attendance	Series	Recap
1	May 7	Minnesota	3–2		Campbell	Coca-Cola Coliseum	6,868	0–1	
2	May 9	Minnesota	3–5		Campbell	Coca-Cola Coliseum	7,659	1–1	
3	May 11	@ Minnesota	5–7		Campbell	Xcel Energy Center	3,917	1–2	
4	May 14	@ Minnesota	3–4	OT	Jackson	Xcel Energy Center	3,107	1–3	

== Player statistics ==
As of May 14, 2025

=== Skaters ===
Regular season
Player	GP	G	A	Pts	SOG	+/−	PIM
Daryl Watts	30	12	15	27	99	–2	12
Hannah Miller	29	10	14	24	59	+14	8
Renata Fast	30	6	16	22	62	0	36
Jesse Compher	30	9	9	18	70	+2	10
Sarah Nurse	21	6	8	14	66	–10	8
Blayre Turnbull	30	5	6	11	77	+1	18
Julia Gosling	30	4	6	10	51	+3	6
Emma Maltais	30	4	5	9	39	–5	14
Kali Flanagan	30	3	4	7	52	–4	6
Izzy Daniel	30	2	5	7	31	–5	8
Savannah Harmon	24	0	6	6	27	0	2
Natalie Spooner	14	3	2	5	31	–1	2
Emma Woods	30	3	1	4	28	+2	14
Hayley Scamurra	19	1	2	3	42	–3	6
Maggie Connors	30	2	0	2	28	–8	6
Allie Munroe	30	1	1	2	21	–2	8
Anna Kjellbin	7	0	2	2	2	–1	0
Laura Kluge	13	0	2	2	5	0	2
Rylind MacKinnon	22	0	2	2	15	–1	27
Jessica Kondas	1	1	0	1	1	+1	0
Megan Carter	19	0	1	1	17	+2	10
Anneke Rankila	3	0	0	0	1	–1	0
Noemi Neubauerová	20	0	0	0	5	–5	4

Playoffs
Player	GP	G	A	Pts	SOG	+/−	PIM
Emma Maltais	4	1	3	4	5	0	0
Julia Gosling	4	3	0	3	8	+2	0
Blayre Turnbull	4	2	1	3	8	0	2
Kali Flanagan	4	1	2	3	9	–1	0
Hannah Miller	4	1	2	3	7	0	0
Jesse Compher	4	0	3	3	6	–1	0
Maggie Connors	4	1	1	2	6	0	0
Savannah Harmon	4	1	1	2	6	0	0
Anna Kjellbin	4	1	1	2	2	0	0
Daryl Watts	4	1	1	2	14	–1	2
Renata Fast	4	0	2	2	14	0	2
Emma Woods	4	0	2	2	3	+2	0
Allie Munroe	4	1	0	1	6	+1	2
Hayley Scamurra	4	1	0	1	7	–1	0
Izzy Daniel	4	0	1	1	2	–1	0
Sarah Nurse	4	0	1	1	7	–4	0
Natalie Spooner	4	0	1	1	6	0	2
Rylind MacKinnon	1	0	0	0	0	0	2
Laura Kluge	3	0	0	0	0	+1	0
Megan Carter	4	0	0	0	3	–2	6

=== Goaltenders ===
Regular season
Player	GP	TOI	W	L	OT	SOL	GA	GAA	SA	SV%	SO	G	A	PIM
Kristen Campbell	21	1227:46	9	8	3	1	46	2.25	512	0.910	0	0	0	0
Raygan Kirk	10	530:15	5	1	1	1	20	2.26	241	0.917	0	0	0	0
Carly Jackson	1	64:37	1	0	0	0	1	0.93	26	0.962	0	0	0	0

Playoffs
Player	GP	TOI	W	L	OT	SOL	GA	GAA	SA	SV%	SO	G	A	PIM
Kristen Campbell	3	176:54	1	2	0	0	14	4.75	75	0.813	0	0	0	0
Carly Jackson	1	76:00	0	0	1	0	4	3.16	26	0.846	0	0	0	0

== Awards and honours ==
=== Milestones ===
Regular season
Date	Player	Milestone
November 30, 2024	Rylind MacKinnon	1st career PWHL assist
November 30, 2024	Rylind MacKinnon	1st career PWHL game
November 30, 2024	Izzy Daniel	1st career PWHL penalty
November 30, 2024	Izzy Daniel	1st career PWHL game
November 30, 2024	Lauren Bernard	1st career PWHL game
November 30, 2024	Noemi Neubauerová	1st career PWHL game
November 30, 2024	Julia Gosling	1st career PWHL game
December 3, 2024	Renata Fast	15th career PWHL assist
December 3, 2024	Izzy Daniel	1st career PWHL goal
December 3, 2024	Lauren Bernard	1st career PWHL assist
December 3, 2024	Rylind MacKinnon	1st career PWHL assist
December 7, 2024	Rylind MacKinnon	1st career PWHL penalty
December 18, 2024	Hannah Miller	10th career PWHL goal
December 18, 2024	Kali Flanagan	5th career PWHL assist
December 18, 2024	Lauren Bernard	1st career PWHL penalty
December 21, 2024	Raygan Kirk	1st career PWHL loss
December 21, 2024	Raygan Kirk	1st career PWHL game
December 21, 2024	Anneke Rankila	1st career PWHL game
December 27, 2024	Sarah Nurse	15th career PWHL assist
December 27, 2024	Daryl Watts	10th career PWHL assist
December 27, 2024	Jesse Compher	5th career PWHL assist
December 27, 2024	Jessica Kondas	1st career PWHL goal
December 27, 2024	Jessica Kondas	1st career PWHL game
December 27, 2024	Julia Gosling	1st career PWHL assist
December 27, 2024	Raygan Kirk	1st career PWHL win
December 31, 2024	Izzy Daniel	1st career PWHL assist
January 8, 2025	Renata Fast	20th career PWHL assist
January 8, 2025	Jesse Compher	5th career PWHL goal
January 8, 2025	Noemi Neubauerová	1st career PWHL penalty
January 12, 2025	Julia Gosling	1st career PWHL penalty
January 25, 2025	Sarah Nurse	15th career PWHL goal
January 25, 2025	Kali Flanagan	5th career PWHL goal
January 25, 2025	Megan Carter	1st career PWHL penalty
January 25, 2025	Megan Carter	1st career PWHL game
January 30, 2025	Hannah Miller	15th career PWHL goal
January 30, 2025	Hannah Miller	15th career PWHL assist
February 1, 2025	Blayre Turnbull	10th career PWHL goal
February 1, 2025	Renata Fast	5th career PWHL goal
February 1, 2025	Julia Gosling	1st career PWHL goal
February 1, 2025	Sarah Nurse	20th career PWHL assist
February 1, 2025	Daryl Watts	15th career PWHL assist
February 1, 2025	Savannah Harmon	10th career PWHL assist
February 14, 2025	Emma Woods	5th career PWHL goal
February 16, 2025	Daryl Watts	15th career PWHL goal
February 16, 2025	Jesse Compher	10th career PWHL assist
February 16, 2025	Laura Kluge	1st career PWHL game
February 19, 2025	Hannah Miller	20th career PWHL assist
February 19, 2025	Laura Kluge	1st career PWHL penalty
February 25, 2025	Jesse Compher	10th career PWHL goal
February 25, 2025	Blayre Turnbull	10th career PWHL assist
March 6, 2025	Maggie Connors	5th career PWHL goal
March 6, 2025	Daryl Watts	20th career PWHL assist
March 6, 2025	Izzy Daniel	5th career PWHL assist
March 6, 2025	Julia Gosling	5th career PWHL assist
March 6, 2025	Megan Carter	1st career PWHL assist
March 19, 2025	Natalie Spooner	10th career PWHL assist
March 23, 2025	Emma Maltais	20th career PWHL assist
March 26, 2025	Daryl Watts	20th career PWHL goal
March 26, 2025	Laura Kluge	1st career PWHL assist
April 29, 2025	Savannah Harmon	15th career PWHL assist
April 29, 2025	Carly Jackson	1st career PWHL game
April 29, 2025	Carly Jackson	1st career PWHL win

Playoffs
Date	Player	Milestone
May 7, 2025	Julia Gosling	5th career PWHL goal
May 7, 2025	Julia Gosling	1st career PWHL playoff goal
May 7, 2025	Renata Fast	30th career PWHL assist
May 7, 2025	Jesse Compher	1st career PWHL playoff assist
May 9, 2025	Hayley Scamurra	1st career PWHL playoff goal
May 9, 2025	Savannah Harmon	1st career PWHL playoff goal
May 9, 2025	Allie Munroe	1st career PWHL playoff goal
May 9, 2025	Emma Woods	5th career PWHL assist
May 9, 2025	Emma Woods	1st career PWHL playoff assist
May 9, 2025	Maggie Connors	1st career PWHL playoff assist
May 11, 2025	Daryl Watts	1st career PWHL playoff goal
May 11, 2025	Daryl Watts	1st career PWHL playoff assist
May 11, 2025	Maggie Connors	1st career PWHL playoff goal
May 11, 2025	Anna Kjellbin	1st career PWHL playoff goal
May 11, 2025	Kali Flanagan	1st career PWHL playoff goal
May 11, 2025	Kali Flanagan	10th career PWHL assist
May 11, 2025	Jesse Compher	15th career PWHL assist
May 11, 2025	Blayre Turnbull	1st career PWHL playoff assist
May 11, 2025	Savannah Harmon	1st career PWHL playoff assist
May 14, 2025	Emma Maltais	10th career PWHL goal
May 14, 2025	Anna Kjellbin	1st career PWHL playoff assist
May 14, 2025	Izzy Daniel	1st career PWHL playoff assist

=== Honours ===
- On January 2, 2025, Sarah Nurse was named as a December SupraStar of the Month
- January 27, 2025: Hannah Miller earned PWHL Second Star of the Week
- On February 3, 2025, Hannah Miller was named as a January SupraStar of the Month
- February 3, 2025: Renata Fast earned PWHL Second Star of the Week
- February 17, 2025: Hannah Miller again earned PWHL Second Star of the Week
- February 24, 2025: Kristen Campbell and Hannah Miller earned PWHL Second and Third Stars of the Week, respectively
- On March 3, 2025, Hannah Miller was named to the March SupraStars of the Month team
- March 24, 2025: Kristen Campbell earned PWHL Second Star of the Week
- March 31, 2025: Daryl Watts earned PWHL Third Star of the Week
- On April 3, 2025, both Renata Fast and Kristen Campbell were honored on the PWHL SupraStars of the Month team for March

== Transactions ==
Toronto has been involved in the following transactions during the 2024–25 PWHL season.

=== Signings ===
Players the Toronto Sceptres have signed
Date	Player	Position	Term	Previous Team
June 20, 2024	Allie Munroe	D	2 years	Toronto Sceptres
June 21, 2024	Hannah Miller	F	1 year	Toronto Sceptres
June 21, 2024	Emma Woods	F	2 years	New York Sirens
June 21, 2024	Daryl Watts	F	2 years	Ottawa Charge
June 25, 2024	Julia Gosling	F	2 years	St. Lawrence
June 25, 2024	Raygan Kirk	G	2 years	Ohio State
June 26, 2024	Megan Carter	D	2 years	Northeastern
June 27, 2024	Izzy Daniel	F	2 years	Cornell
July 9, 2024	Carly Jackson	G	1 year	Toronto Sceptres

=== Trades ===
Date	Details	
December 30, 2024	To Ottawa Victoria Bach; Jocelyne Larocque	To Toronto Hayley Scamurra; Savannah Harmon

== Draft picks ==
Below are PWHL Toronto's selections at the 2024 PWHL Draft, which was held on June 10, 2024, at Roy Wilkins Auditorium in Saint Paul.

Toronto Sceptres 2024 draft picks
Round	#	Player	Pos	Nationality	College/junior/club team	Reference
1	6	Julia Gosling	C	Canada	St. Lawrence Saints (ECAC)	
2	12	Megan Carter	D	Canada	Northeastern Huskies (Hockey East)	
3	18	Izzy Daniel	F	United States	Cornell Big Red (ECAC)	
4	24	Lauren Bernard	D	United States	Ohio State Buckeyes (WCHA)	
5	30	Noemi Nuebauerová	F	Czech Republic	Brynäs IF (SDHL)	
6	36	Anneke Linser	F	United States	Djurgårdens IF (SDHL)	
7	42	Raygan Kirk	G	Canada	Ohio State Buckeyes (WCHA)	
