= 2024–25 New York Sirens season =

Professional Women's Hockey League season

2024–25 New York Sirens
- League: 6 PWHL
- 2024–25 record: 8–4–5–13
- Home record: 2–3–2–8
- Road record: 6–1–3–5
- Goals for: 71
- Goals against: 80

Team information
- General manager: Pascal Daoust
- Coach: Greg Fargo
- Assistant coach: Josh Sciba; Mike Sommer; Lauren Williams
- Captain: Micah Zandee-Hart
- Alternate captains: Alex Carpenter; Ella Shelton
- Arena: Prudential Center
- Average attendance: 2,764

Team leaders
- Goals: Sarah Fillier (13)
- Assists: Sarah Fillier (16)
- Points: Sarah Fillier (29)
- Penalty minutes: Sarah Fillier (35)
- Plus/minus: Sarah Fillier (+10)
- Wins: Corinne Schroeder (10)
- Goals against average: Kayle Osborne (2.22)

The 2024–25 New York Sirens season was the team's second season as a member of the Professional Women's Hockey League. They played their home games at Prudential Center in Newark, New Jersey.

== Offseason ==
- On June 7, 2024, New York named Greg Fargo as their new head coach. Fargo was formerly the head coach of the Colgate Raiders women's ice hockey program.

== Standings ==
Pos	Team	Pld	W	OTW	OTL	L	GF	GA	GD	Pts	Qualification
1	Montreal Victoire (Y)	30	12	7	3	8	77	67	+10	53	Playoffs
2	Toronto Sceptres (X)	30	12	3	6	9	73	73	0	48	Playoffs
3	Ottawa Charge (X)	30	12	2	4	12	71	80	−9	44 (Note: Regulation wins: Ottawa 12, Minnesota 10, Boston 9)	Playoffs
4	Minnesota Frost (X)	30	10	5	4	11	85	76	+9	44	Playoffs
5	Boston Fleet (E)	30	9	6	5	10	75	76	−1	44	
6	New York Sirens (E)	30	8	4	5	13	71	80	−9	37	

Updated to match(es) played on May 3, 2025. Source: PWHL
(E) Eliminated; (X) Clinched playoff berth; (Y) Clinched first place

== Schedule and results ==
=== Preseason ===
The preseason schedule was published on October 1, 2024.

All times in Eastern Time.

Pre-season camp

Date	Time	Visitor	Score	Home	OT	Notes	Box Score/Recap
November 21	2:30	Minnesota	4–3	New York	OT	@ Ford Performance Centre	
November 22	2:30	New York	5–2	Toronto		@ Ford Performance Centre	

=== Regular season ===
The regular season schedule was announced on October 15, 2024. The Sirens' regular season will begin on December 1, 2024, and will end on May 2, 2025, with each team playing 30 games; six games against every opponent.

Regular season schedule (Home: 2–3–2–8; Road: 6–1–3–5)
December: 2–1–1–2, 9 points (Home: 1–0–1–1; Road: 1–1–0–1)

Game	Date	Opponent	Score	OT	Decision	Location	Attendance	Record	Points	Recap
1	December 1	@ Minnesota	4–3	OT	Schroeder	Xcel Energy Center	8,022	0–1–0–0	2	
2	December 4	@ Montreal	4–1		Schroeder	Place Bell	5,415	1–1–0–0	5	
3	December 8	@ Boston	2–4		Schroeder	Tsongas Center	4,003	1–1–0–1	5	
4	December 18	Toronto	4–2		Schroeder	Prudential Center	2,851	2–1–0–1	8	
5	December 22	Minnesota	3–4	SO	Osborne	Prudential Center	2,722	2–1–1–1	9	
6	December 29	Ottawa	1–3		Schroeder	Prudential Center	2,946	2–1–1–2	9	

January: 2–2–1–2, 11 points (Home: 0–2–0–1; Road: 2–0–1–1)

Game	Date	Opponent	Score	OT	Decision	Location	Attendance	Record	Points	Recap
7	January 4	@ Minnesota	5–0		Schroeder	Xcel Energy Center	6,414	3–1–1–2	12	
8	January 7	Ottawa	2–3		Osborne	Prudential Center	1,569	3–1–1–3	12	
9	January 12	Toronto	1–0	OT	Schroeder	Prudential Center	3,258	3–2–1–3	14	
10	January 15	Minnesota	3–2	SO	Schroeder	Prudential Center	1,780	3–3–1–3	16	
11	January 25	@ Toronto	2–4		Schroeder	Scotiabank Arena	19,102	3–3–1–4	16	
12	January 27	@ Ottawa	3–0		Osborne	TD Place Arena	5,629	4–3–1–4	19	
13	January 31	@ Boston	2–3	SO	Schroeder	Tsongas Center	5,912	4–3–2–4	20	

February: 0–0–2–5, 2 points (Home: 0–0–1–4; Road: 0–0–1–1)

Game	Date	Opponent	Score	OT	Decision	Location	Attendance	Record	Points	Recap
14	February 2	Montreal	1–2		Osborne	Prudential Center	4,346	4–3–2–5	20	
15	February 12	Boston	0–4		Schroeder	Prudential Center	1,729	4–3–2–6	20	
16	February 15	@ Montreal	2–6		Schroeder	Place Bell	10,172	4–3–2–7	20	
17	February 17	Boston	1–4		Osborne	Prudential Center	3,715	4–3–2–8	20	
18	February 19	Toronto	1–4		Schroeder	Prudential Center	1,569	4–3–2–9	20	
19	February 23	Boston	2–3	SO	Osborne	KeyBank Center	8,512	4–3–3–9	21	
20	February 26	@ Ottawa	4–5	OT	Schroeder	TD Place Arena	5,005	4–3–4–9	22	

March: 2–1–0–3, 8 points (Home: 1–1–0–1; Road: 1–0–0–2)

Game	Date	Opponent	Score	OT	Decision	Location	Attendance	Record	Points	Recap
21	March 5	@ Boston	2–5		Osborne	Tsongas Center	3,252	4–3–4–10	22	
22	March 12	Montreal	3–2	OT	Schroeder	Prudential Center	1,944	4–4–4–10	24	
23	March 16	Minnesota	4–1		Schroeder	Little Caesars Arena	14,288	5–4–4–10	27	183
24	March 19	@ Toronto	1–2		Schroeder	Coca-Cola Coliseum	8,351	5–4–4–11	27	
25	March 22	Ottawa	2–5		Schroeder	Prudential Center	4,767	5–4–4–12	27	
26	March 25	@ Ottawa	6–3		Osborne	TD Place Arena	5,707	6–4–4–12	30	

April: 2–0–1–0, 7 points (Home: 0–0–0–0; Road: 2–0–1–0)

Game	Date	Opponent	Score	OT	Decision	Location	Attendance	Record	Points	Recap
27	April 1	@ Montreal	1–0		Schroeder	Place Bell	8,798	7–4–4–12	33	
28	April 27	@ Minnesota	2–0		Schroeder	Xcel Energy Center	6,472	8–4–4–12	36	
29	April 29	@ Toronto	1–2	SO	Osborne	Coca-Cola Coliseum	8,532	8–4–5–12	37	

May: 0–0–0–1, 0 points (Home: 0–0–0–1; Road: 0–0–0–0)

Game	Date	Opponent	Score	OT	Decision	Location	Attendance	Record	Points	Recap
30	May 3	Montreal	2–3		Levy	Prudential Center	2,737	8–4–5–13	37	

Regulation Win (3 points) Overtime/Shootout win (2 points) Overtime/shootout loss (1 point) Regulation Loss (0 points)

== Player statistics ==
As of May 3, 2025

=== Skaters ===
Regular season
Player	GP	G	A	Pts	SOG	+/−	PIM
Sarah Fillier	30	13	16	29	105	+10	35
Jessie Eldridge	30	9	15	24	77	0	18
Alex Carpenter	26	11	9	20	59	+5	0
Abby Roque	30	6	11	17	80	–8	6
Ella Shelton	24	8	8	16	50	–1	12
Micah Zandee-Hart	30	1	9	10	56	–5	16
Paetyn Levis	30	4	4	8	47	0	10
Jaime Bourbonnais	30	2	5	7	52	–4	16
Jade Downie-Landry	30	4	2	6	46	–2	33
Maja Nylén Persson	23	2	4	6	26	–1	2
Elle Hartje	27	0	6	6	35	–9	6
Allyson Simpson	30	1	4	5	41	–11	12
Chloé Aurard	27	2	2	4	20	–3	2
Élizabeth Giguère	29	2	2	4	37	–5	4
Brooke Hobson	29	1	3	4	15	–7	10
Gabby Rosenthal	29	1	3	4	31	–2	8
Taylor Girard	18	1	2	3	18	–1	10
Noora Tulus	30	1	1	2	36	–12	6
Lauren Bernard	8	0	2	2	0	0	0
Emmy Fecteau	30	1	0	1	28	–10	6
Kayla Vespa	10	0	0	0	4	–2	0
Olivia Knowles	12	0	0	0	0	+1	0

=== Goaltenders ===
Regular season
Player	GP	TOI	W	L	OT	SOL	GA	GAA	SA	SV%	SO	G	A	PIM
Corinne Schroeder	20	1162:11	10	8	1	1	47	2.43	577	0.919	4	0	0	0
Kayle Osborne	10	567:57	2	4	0	3	21	2.22	249	0.916	1	0	1	0
Abigail Levy	2	76:52	0	1	0	0	5	3.90	33	0.848	0	0	0	0

== Awards and honors ==
=== Milestones ===
Regular season
Date	Player	Milestone
December 1, 2024	Ella Shelton	15th career PWHL assist
December 1, 2024	Alex Carpenter	10th career PWHL goal
December 1, 2024	Gabby Rosenthal	1st career PWHL goal
December 1, 2024	Gabby Rosenthal	1st career PWHL game
December 1, 2024	Sarah Fillier	1st career PWHL assist
December 1, 2024	Sarah Fillier	1st career PWHL game
December 1, 2024	Emmy Fecteau	1st career PWHL penalty
December 1, 2024	Emmy Fecteau	1st career PWHL game
December 1, 2024	Elle Hartje	1st career PWHL game
December 1, 2024	Maja Nylén Persson	1st career PWHL game
December 1, 2024	Allyson Simpson	1st career PWHL game
December 1, 2024	Noora Tulus	1st career PWHL game
December 4, 2024	Sarah Fillier	1st career PWHL goal
December 4, 2024	Sarah Fillier	1st career PWHL penalty
December 4, 2024	Jessie Eldridge	10th career PWHL assist
December 4, 2024	Micah Zandee-Hart	5th career PWHL assist
December 4, 2024	Allyson Simpson	1st career PWHL assist
December 8, 2024	Paetyn Levis	1st career PWHL goal
December 8, 2024	Noora Tulus	1st career PWHL penalty
December 18, 2024	Emmy Fecteau	1st career PWHL goal
December 18, 2024	Noora Tulus	1st career PWHL goal
December 18, 2024	Micah Zandee-Hart	1st career PWHL goal
December 18, 2024	Sarah Fillier	5th career PWHL assist
December 18, 2024	Maja Nylén Persson	1st career PWHL assist
December 18, 2024	Allyson Simpson	1st career PWHL penalty
December 22, 2024	Elle Hartje	1st career PWHL assist
December 29, 2024	Gabby Rosenthal	1st career PWHL penalty
January 4, 2025	Alex Carpenter	20th career PWHL assist
January 4, 2025	Gabby Rosenthal	1st career PWHL assist
January 7, 2025	Maja Nylén Persson	1st career PWHL goal
January 7, 2025	Noora Tulus	1st career PWHL assist
January 12, 2025	Jessie Eldridge	10th career PWHL goal
January 15, 2025	Sarah Fillier	5th career PWHL goal
January 15, 2025	Abby Roque	10th career PWHL assist
January 25, 2025	Allyson Simpson	1st career PWHL penalty
January 27, 2025	Jessie Eldridge	15th career PWHL assist
January 27, 2025	Kayle Osborne	1st career PWHL win
January 27, 2025	Kayle Osborne	1st career PWHL shutout
January 31, 2025	Ella Shelton	10th career PWHL goal
February 2, 2025	Allyson Simpson	1st career PWHL goal
February 2, 2025	Sarah Fillier	10th career PWHL assist
February 15, 2025	Elle Hartje	1st career PWHL penalty
February 17, 2025	Maja Nylén Persson	1st career PWHL penalty
February 19, 2025	Alex Carpenter	15th career PWHL goal
February 19, 2025	Paetyn Levis	5th career PWHL assist
February 26, 2025	Abby Roque	10th career PWHL goal
March 6, 2025	Élizabeth Giguère	5th career PWHL goal
March 6, 2025	Abby Roque	15th career PWHL assist
March 12, 2025	Jaime Bourbonnais	10th career PWHL assist
March 12, 2025	Micah Zandee-Hart	10th career PWHL assist
March 12, 2025	Elle Hartje	5th career PWHL assist
March 16, 2025	Jesse Eldridge	15th career PWHL goal
March 16, 2025	Sarah Fillier	10th career PWHL goal
March 16, 2025	Sarah Fillier	15th career PWHL assist
March 16, 2025	Brooke Hobson	5th career PWHL assist
March 19, 2025	Ella Shelton	20th career PWHL assist
March 25, 2025	Jade Downie-Landry	10th career PWHL goal
March 25, 2025	Jessie Eldridge	20th career PWHL assist
April 27, 2025	Taylor Girard	5th career PWHL goal
April 29, 2025	Ella Shelton	15th career PWHL goal

=== Honors ===
- December 2, 2024: Alex Carpenter named PWHL First Star of the Week
- December 9, 2024: Sarah Fillier and Alex Carpenter were named the First and Third Stars of the Week, respectively
- January 2, 2025: Alex Carpenter and Sarah Fillier were named to the December SupraStars of the Month team
- January 13, 2025: Corinne Schroeder was named the PWHL Second Star of the Week
- January 20, 2025: Erin Ambrose was named the PWHL First Star of the Week
- March 17, 2025: Abby Roque and Corinne Schroeder were named the PWHL Second and Third Stars of the Week, respectively
- April 7, 2025: Corinne Schroeder was again honored as the PWHL Third Star of the Week

== Transactions ==
New York has been involved in the following transactions during the 2024–25 PWHL season.

=== Signings ===
Players the New York Sirens have signed
Date	Player	Position	Term	Previous team	Ref
June 11, 2024	Corinne Schroeder	G	2 years	New York Sirens	
June 21, 2024	Abbey Levy	G	1 year	New York Sirens	
July 11, 2024	Maja Nylén Persson	D	3 years	Brynäs IF	
July 25, 2024	Noora Tulus	F	2 years	Luleå HF	
August 20, 2024	Kayle Osborne	G	3 years	Colgate	
November 1, 2024	Sarah Fillier	F	1 year	Princeton	

== Draft picks ==
Below are New York's selections at the 2024 PWHL Draft, which was held on June 10, 2024, at Roy Wilkins Auditorium in Saint Paul.

New York Sirens 2024 draft picks
Round	#	Player	Pos	Nationality	College/junior/club team
1	1	Sarah Fillier	F	Canada	Princeton University (ECAC)
2	10	Maja Nylén Persson	D	Sweden	Brynäs IF (SDHL)
3	13	Noora Tulus	F	Finland	Luleå HF/MSSK (SDHL)
3	16	Allyson Simpson	D	United States	Colgate University (ECAC)
4	19	Gabby Rosenthal	F	United States	Ohio State University (WCHA)
5	25	Elle Hartje	F	United States	Yale University (ECAC)
5	28	Kayle Osborne	G	Canada	Colgate Raiders (ECAC)
6	31	Emmy Fecteau	F	Canada	Concordia University (RSEQ)
