= Lucy Morgan (ice hockey) =

American ice hockey goaltender (born 2001)

- Born: August 18, 2001 (age 25) Mandan, North Dakota, U.S.
- Height: 5 ft 7 in (170 cm)
- Position: Goaltender
- Catches: Left
- PWHL team Former teams: Ottawa Charge; Minnesota Frost
- Playing career: 2024–present

Lucy Morgan (born August 18, 2001) is an American professional ice hockey goaltender for the Ottawa Charge of the Professional Women's Hockey League (PWHL). She played college ice hockey at St. Lawrence University and the University of Minnesota.

== Playing career ==
=== Youth ===
As a youth player, Morgan was part of a massive upset in North Dakota state tournament hockey. Her second year on the team the Mandan Braves, they beat a dominant 15-3-0 Fargo North-South team, who had already begun to plan their post-game celebrations. Morgan stopped 49 of 50 shots and helped Mandan win 2-1 in overtime. She then played for Maple Grove in Minnesota where she posted a .943 save percentage.

=== College ===
Morgan began her college ice hockey career at St. Lawrence University, where she was a walk-on to their Division I team. She missed out on recruiting due to playing in a rarely-scouted area for her first two years of high school. St. Lawrence took a chance on her and Morgan earned the starting goaltender position as a freshman. She recorded thirteen shutouts in four years. After averaging a .928 save percentage with St. Lawrence, Morgan used her fifth year of eligibility with the Minnesota Golden Gophers, where she averaged .931 and went 15-3.

=== Professional ===
The Minnesota Frost signed Morgan as a Reserve Player for the 2024–25 season after training camp. Following the illness of goaltender Maddie Rooney, the team signed Morgan to a 10-day Standard Player Agreement on January 2, 2025. Prior to the Frost's game against the New York Sirens on January 4, 2025, Nicole Hensley was injured during warmups, elevating Morgan to the starting position for her PWHL debut. After returning to the Frost's reserve list, Morgan was signed by the Ottawa Charge on March 14, 2025, following an injury to Emerance Maschmeyer.

== Career statistics ==
Note: GP = Games played; Min, TOI = Minutes played; W = Wins; L = Losses; T,T/OT = Ties; OTL = Overtime losses; GA = Goals-against; GAA = Goals-against average; SO = Shutouts; SV% = Save percentage;

			Regular season									Playoffs
Season	Team	League	GP	W	L	T/OT	MIN	GA	SO	GAA	SV%	GP	W	L	MIN	GA	SO	GAA	SV%
2019–20	St. Lawrence Saints	ECAC	29	8	6	12	1507	46	4	1.83	.928	—	—	—	—	—	—	—	—
2020–21	St. Lawrence Saints	ECAC	12	6	5	0	677	25	0	2.21	.933	—	—	—	—	—	—	—	—
2021–22	St. Lawrence Saints	ECAC	34	13	14	7	2044	60	5	1.76	.939	—	—	—	—	—	—	—	—
2022–23	St. Lawrence Saints	ECAC	35	15	17	3	2019	76	4	2.26	.915	—	—	—	—	—	—	—	—
2023–24	Minnesota Golden Gophers	WCHA	20	15	3	0	1124	31	3	1.65	.931	—	—	—	—	—	—	—	—
2024–25	Minnesota Frost	PWHL	1	0	1	0	60	5	0	5.00	.853	—	—	—	—	—	—	—	—
NCAA totals			130	57	45	22	7372	238	16	1.94	.929	—	—	—	—	—	—	—	—
PWHL totals			1	0	1	0	60	5	0	5.00	.853	—	—	—	—	—	—	—	—
