= Charlotte Akervik =

American ice hockey player (born 2001)

- Born: February 17, 2001 (age 25) Eau Claire, Wisconsin, U.S.
- Height: 5 ft 10 in (178 cm)
- Position: Defence
- SDHL team Former teams: Djurgårdens IF; Minnesota Frost
- Playing career: 2024–present

Charlotte Akervik (born February 17, 2001) is an American professional ice hockey defenceman for Djurgårdens IF in the Swedish Women's Hockey League. She previously won the 2024–25 Walter Cup with the Minnesota Frost of the Professional Women's Hockey League (PWHL). She played college ice hockey at Minnesota State.

== Playing career ==
=== College ===
Akervik played her college ice hockey at Minnesota State. She appeared in 153 games over five seasons and left as the highest-scoring defencemen in the program with 57 points, 21st all time for the Maveriks. She was named the WCHA Defender of the Week for January 10, 2024. Avervik also served as captain her final season.

=== Professional ===
The Minnesota Frost signed Akervik as a Reserve Player for the 2024–25 season after training camp. Following the injury of Frost defender Sophie Jaques, the team signed Akervik to a standard player agreement on December 22, 2024. She signed another standard player agreement with the Frost on February 6, 2025, after Natalie Buchbinder was placed on Long Term Injured Reserve (LTIR). Akervik won the 2025 Walter Cup with the Frost.

Akervik signed with Djurgårdens IF for the 2025–26 season.

== Career statistics ==
Note: GP = Games played; G = Goals; A = Assists; Pts = Points; PIM = Penalty minutes;

| | | | Regular season | | | | | Playoffs |
| Season | Team | League | GP | G | A | Pts | PIM | GP | G | A | Pts | PIM |
|---|---|---|---|---|---|---|---|---|---|---|---|---|
| 2019–20 | Minnesota State University | WCHA | 35 | 3 | 3 | 6 | 14 | — | — | — | — | — |
| 2020–21 | Minnesota State University | WCHA | 20 | 1 | 1 | 2 | 12 | — | — | — | — | — |
| 2021–22 | Minnesota State University | WCHA | 32 | 8 | 17 | 25 | 10 | — | — | — | — | — |
| 2022–23 | Minnesota State University | WCHA | 32 | 5 | 6 | 11 | 14 | — | — | — | — | — |
| 2023–24 | Minnesota State University | WCHA | 34 | 5 | 8 | 13 | 17 | — | — | — | — | — |
| 2024–25 | Minnesota Frost | PWHL | 2 | 0 | 0 | 0 | 0 | — | — | — | — | — |
| PWHL totals | | | 2 | 0 | 0 | 0 | 0 | — | — | — | — | — |

== Awards and honors ==
| Honors | Year |
PWHL
| Walter Cup Champion | 2025 |
