= Place Bell =

Arena in Laval, Quebec, Canada

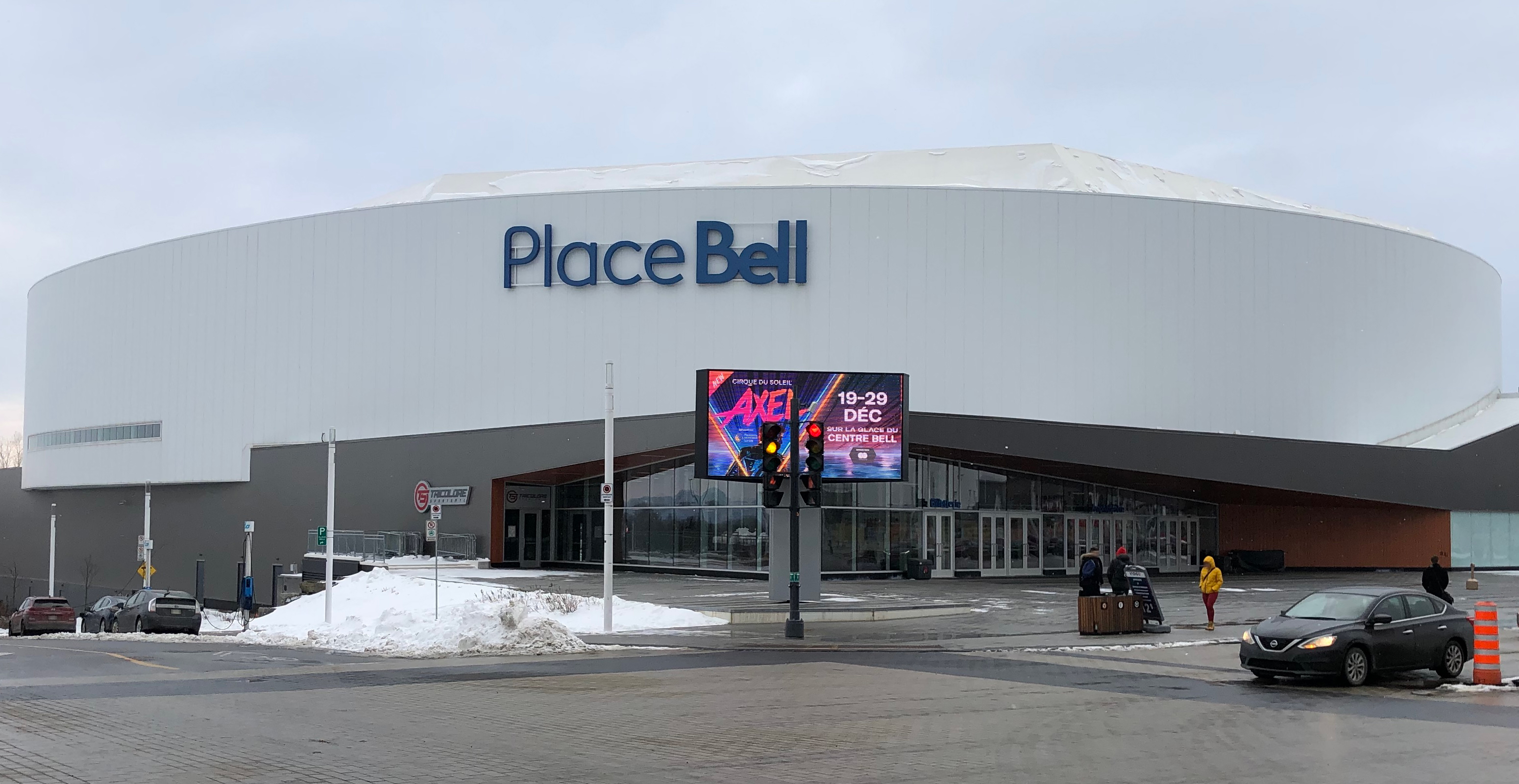
- Exterior view from Cnr Rue Lucien-Paiement & Rue Claude-Gagné in November 2019
- Interactive map of Place Bell
- Address: 1950 Rue Claude-Gagné
- Location: Laval, Quebec
- Coordinates: 45.5558°N 73.7218°W
- Owner: City of Laval
- Operator: Evenko and Harden
- Capacity: Main arena: 10,172; Arena 2: 2,500; Arena 3: 500
- Public transit: Montmorency; Terminus Montmorency; Société de transport de Laval

Construction
- Opened: August 31, 2017
- Cost: $200 million
- Architect: Lemay

Tenants
- Laval Rocket (AHL) (2017–present); Les Canadiennes de Montreal (CWHL) (2018–2019); Montreal Victoire (PWHL) (2024–present)

Website
- Official Website

Place Bell is a multi-purpose arena in Laval, Quebec, Canada. The complex includes a 10,172-seat main arena, which is the home of the Laval Rocket of the American Hockey League (AHL), and two smaller community ice rinks, one of which has Olympic-size ice. The arena was also home to Les Canadiennes de Montréal for the final season of play in the Canadian Women's Hockey League (CWHL). The arena hosted select games for Montréal Victoire of the Professional Women's Hockey League (PWHL) during the inaugural 2023–24 season, and became their permanent home for the 2024–25 season.

== History ==
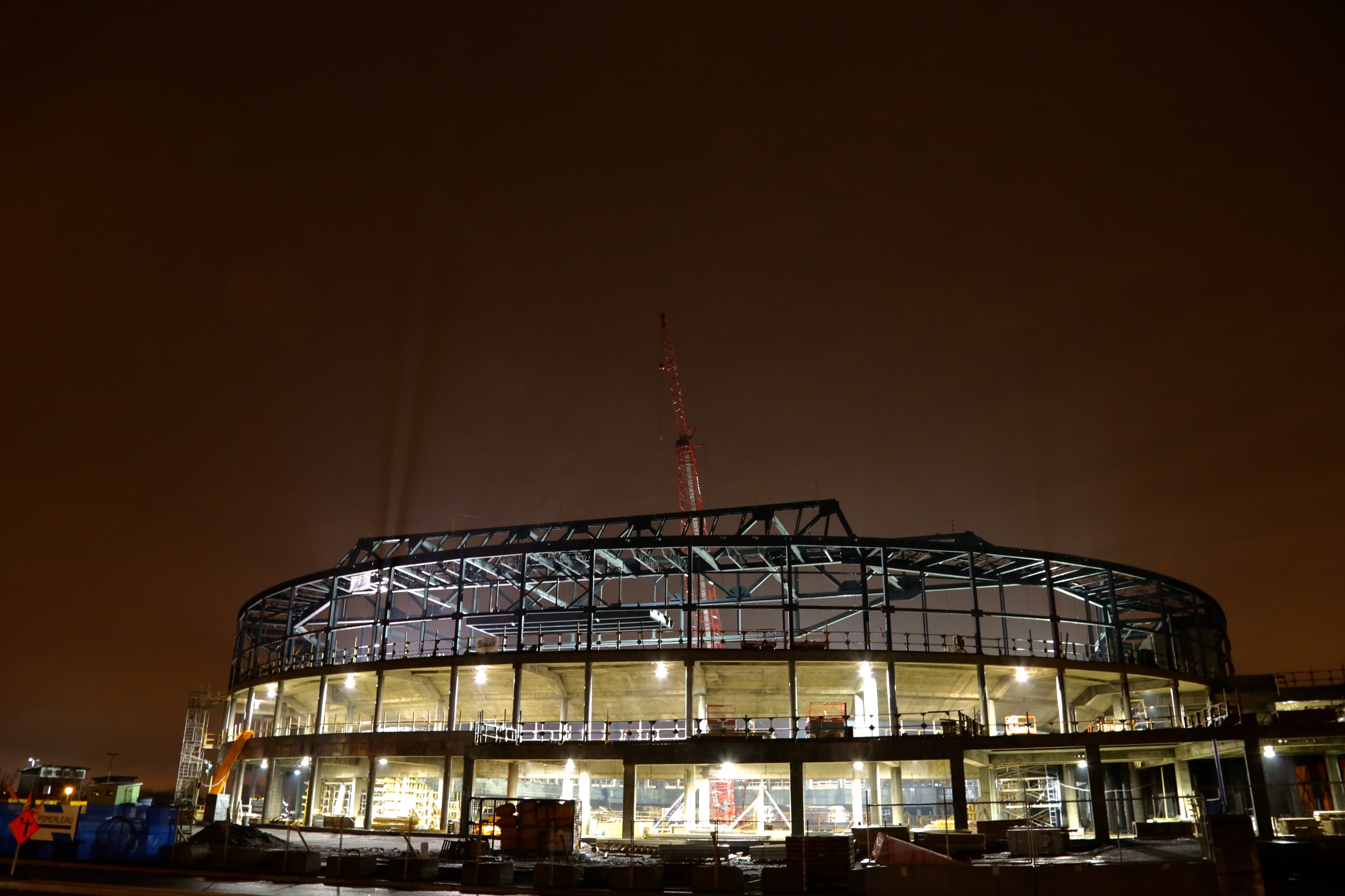
Construction of Place Bell in 2015.

=== Construction ===
Then-mayor of Laval, Gilles Vaillancourt, announced the project on February 13, 2012. The facility is managed by Evenko, the same company that operates the Bell Centre in Montreal, home of the National Hockey League's Montreal Canadiens. As in the case of the Bell Centre, the naming rights for the Laval arena were acquired by Bell Canada. The cost of the project roughly doubled after it was first announced. Originally announced to cost $92.6 million, the estimate was revised less than a year later to $150 million. In March 2014, Laval's new mayor, Marc Demers, estimated that the cost of Place Bell would be $200 million, because of costs not factored by the previous administration. The Government of Quebec committed to contributing $46 million; Demers asked that the province assume more of the costs, as it did for other arena projects.

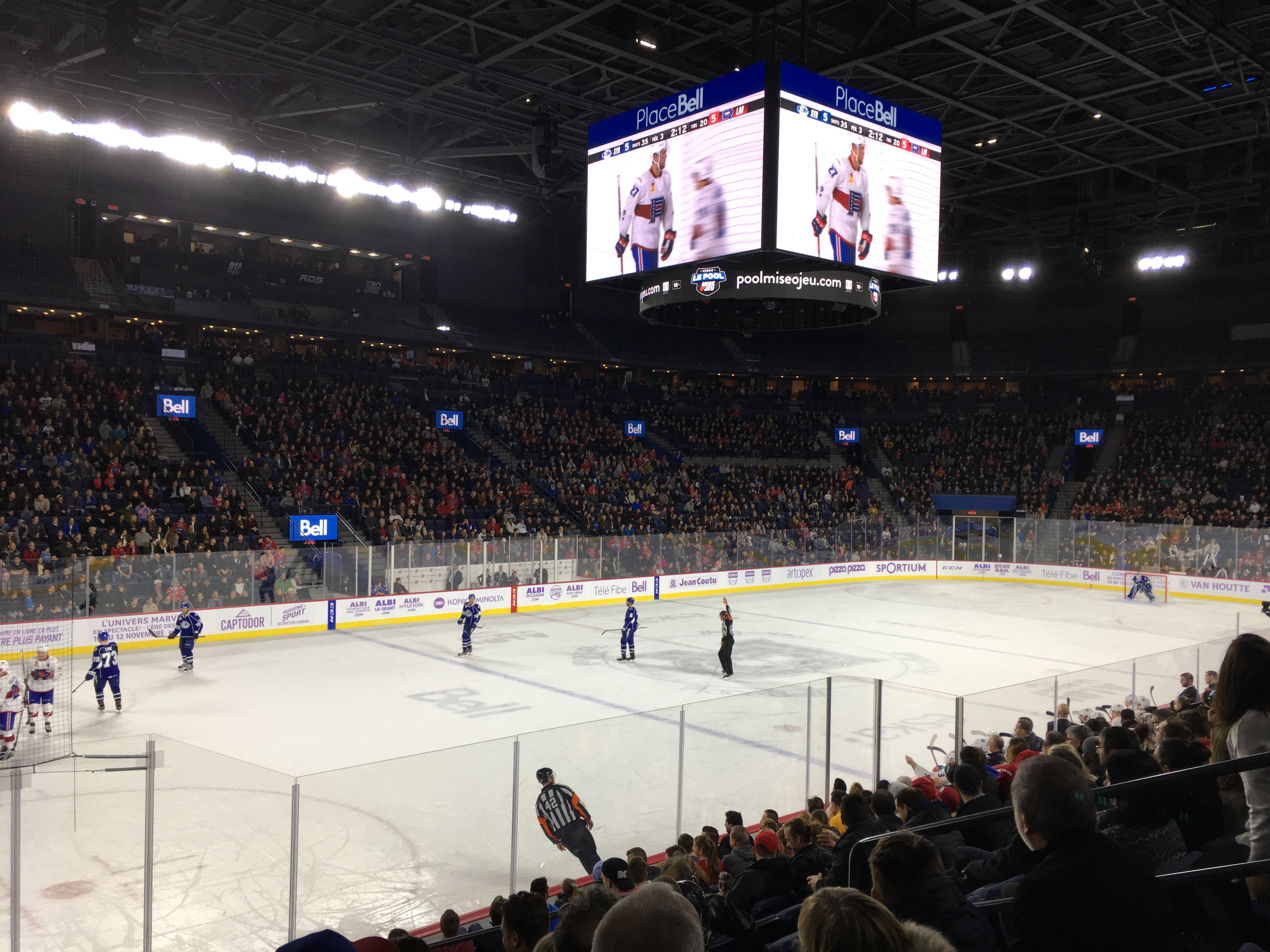
Place Bell during a 2017 Laval Rocket game against the Syracuse Crunch

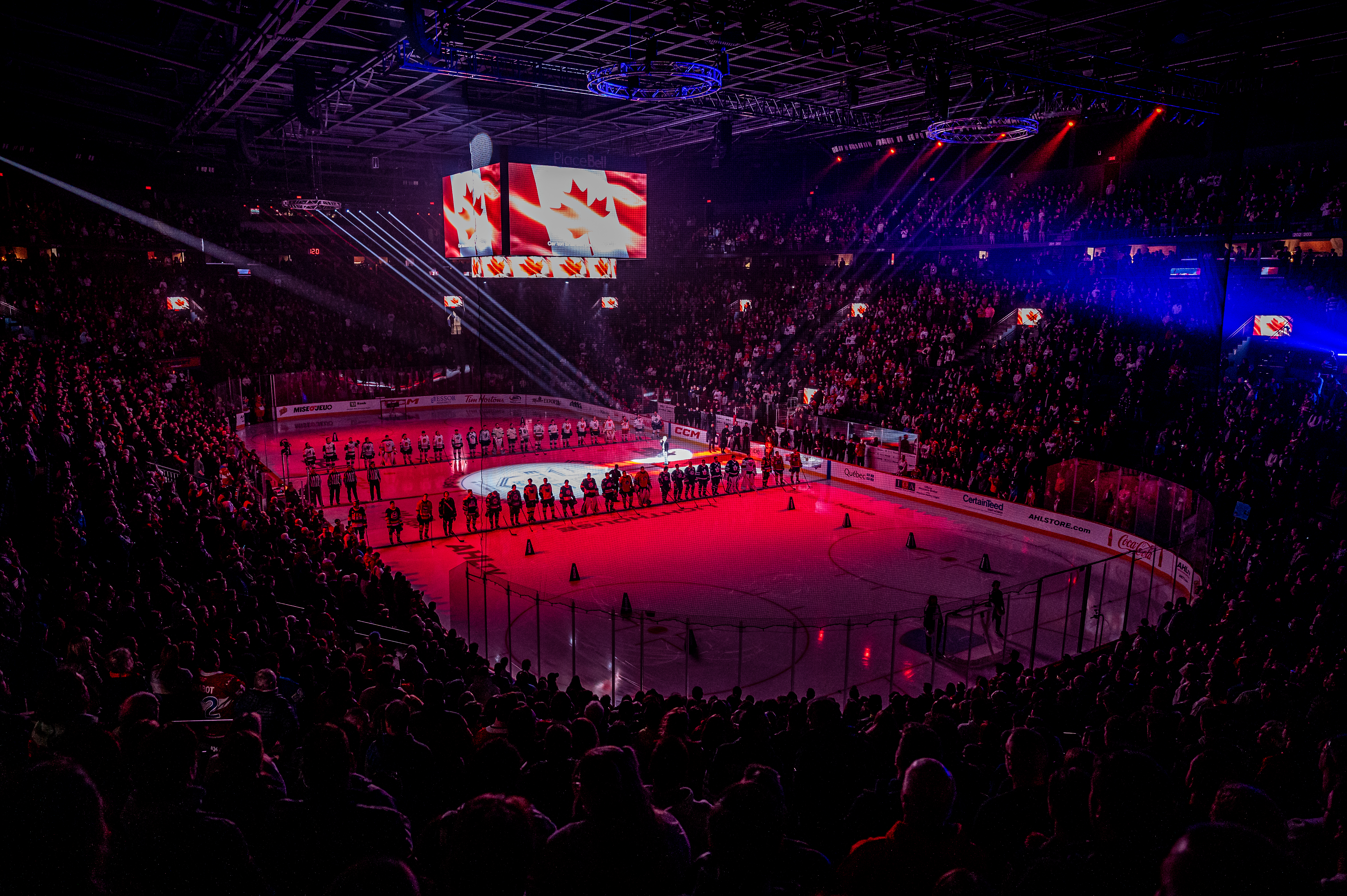
Place Bell prior to the 2023 AHL Skills Competition

Initial plans called for the arena to be built in the city's Quartier de l'Agora district, next to the Laval courthouse, but the unstable soil in that location led to a move. In October 2012, the city announced that the project would be located adjacent to the Montmorency station of the Montreal Metro Orange Line. Construction started in late 2014 and was completed in 2017.

=== Major tenants ===
On July 11, 2016, the Montreal Canadiens announced that its AHL affiliate, then known as the St. John's IceCaps, would relocate to Place Bell in 2017. On September 8, 2016, the Canadiens announced that the team would be named the Laval Rocket. The Rocket hosted their inaugural game at the arena on October 6, 2017, defeating the Belleville Senators by a score of 3–0. Canadiens owner Geoff Molson and team legend Guy Lafleur both took part in the pre-game ceremonial puck drop; Daniel Audette scored the franchise's first goal, while Charlie Lindgren recorded the shutout. The Rocket's first home playoff game took place on May 12, 2022; the Rocket defeated the Syracuse Crunch by a score of 4–1.

In 2020, it was announced that Place Bell would host the 2022 AHL All-Star game. The 2022 game was ultimately cancelled, and Place Bell hosted the 2023 game on February 6, 2023, instead.

On September 20, 2018, it was announced that the Les Canadiennes de Montréal of the CWHL would be moving to the arena from the Complexe sportif Claude-Robillard, playing both in the main arena and the community rink. Les Canadiennes also moved their daily operations and training camp into the complex. The team played one season at Place Bell before the league and team ceased operations following the 2018–19 season. In their lone season at Place Bell, Les Canadiennes advanced to the Clarkson Cup final by defeating the Markham Thunder in the semi-final at Place Bell; they lost the championship final to the Calgary Inferno.

In 2022, Place Bell began hosting NCAA basketball, including the annual Northern Classic Division I tournament, which takes place each November. The 2023 event featured six Division I teams.

In 2023, it was announced that Montréal Victoire of the new Professional Women's Hockey League (PWHL) would host select 2023–24 games at Place Bell, with the majority of its home games hosted at Verdun Auditorium. The first game at Place Bell took place on January 16, 2024, with Montréal defeating visiting New York Sirens by a score of 3–2.

Following a partnership between Canadiens ownership and the owners of the Brooklyn Nets, the arena would host a series of NBA G League home games for Brooklyn's affiliate the Long Island Nets beginning in the 2025 season; notably, for these games the G League Nets wear special home uniforms branding the team as Les Nets Montreal as a secondary name.

== Tenants ==
=== Current ===
Team	League	Since	Championships
Laval Rocket	American Hockey League	2017	0
Montréal Victoire	Professional Women's Hockey League	2023	1
McGill Redbirds	Ontario University Athletics	2024	1
McGill Martlets	Réseau du sport étudiant du Québec	2024	4

=== Former ===
Team	League	Years
Les Canadiennes de Montréal	Canadian Women's Hockey League	2018–19
