= List of Ottawa Charge draft picks =

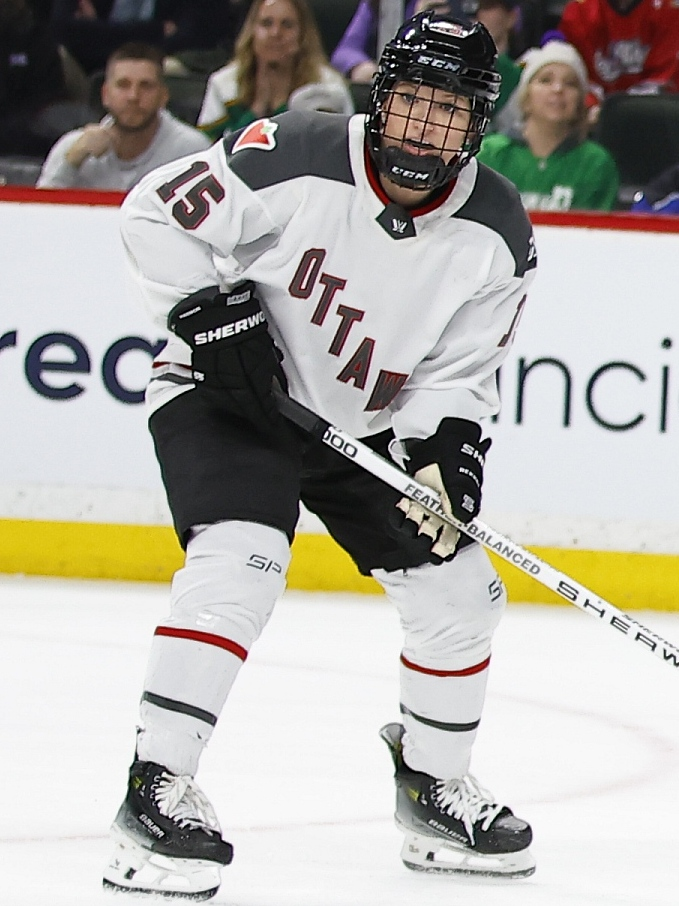
Savannah Harmon was the first ever draft selection for Ottawa, taken fifth overall in 2023.

The Ottawa Charge are a professional ice hockey team in the Professional Women's Hockey League (PWHL). Their first draft pick was Savannah Harmon, selected fifth overall in the 2023 PWHL draft. The Charge have participated in four PWHL Drafts and have drafted 34 players.

== Key ==
General terms and abbreviations
Term or abbreviation	Definition
Draft	The year that the player was selected
Round	The round of the draft in which the player was selected
Pick	The overall position in the draft at which the player was selected
Pos	Position of the player

Position abbreviations
Abbreviation	Definition
G	Goaltender
D	Defence
LW	Left wing
C	Centre
RW	Right wing
F	Forward

== Draft picks ==
Full list of Ottawa Charge draft picks
Draft	Round	Pick	Player	Nationality	Pos	School/club team	Conference/league
2023	1	5	Savannah Harmon	United States	D	Team Harvey's	PWHPA
2023	2	8	Ashton Bell	Canada	D	University of Minnesota Duluth	WCHA
2023	3	17	Jincy Roese	United States	D	Team Adidas	PWHPA
2023	4	20	Gabbie Hughes	United States	F	University of Minnesota Duluth	WCHA
2023	5	29	Hayley Scamurra	United States	F	Team Harvey's	PWHPA
2023	6	32	Daryl Watts	Canada	F	Toronto Six	PHF
2023	7	41	Aneta Tejralová	Czech Republic	D	Boston Pride	PHF
2023	8	44	Kateřina Mrázová	Czech Republic	C	Connecticut Whale	PHF
2023	9	53	Zoe Boyd	Canada	D	Quinnipiac University	ECAC
2023	10	56	Kristin Della Rovere	Canada	F	Harvard University	ECAC
2023	11	65	Lexie Adzija	Canada	F	Quinnipiac University	ECAC
2023	12	68	Sandra Abstreiter	Germany	G	Connecticut Whale	PHF
2023	13	77	Amanda Boulier	United States	D	Minnesota Whitecaps	PHF
2023	14	80	Caitrin Lonergan	United States	F	Connecticut Whale	PHF
2023	15	89	Audrey-Anne Veillette	Canada	F	Université de Montréal	RSEQ
2024	1	2	Danielle Serdachny	Canada	C	Princeton University	ECAC
2024	2	8	Ronja Savolainen	Finland	D	Luleå HF/MSSK	SDHL
2024	3	14	Gwyneth Philips	United States	G	Northeastern University	Hockey East
2024	4	20	Stephanie Markowski	Canada	D	Ohio State University	WCHA
2024	5	26	Mannon McMahon	United States	F	University of Minnesota Duluth	WCHA
2024	6	32	Anna Meixner	Austria	F	Brynäs IF	SDHL
2024	7	38	Madeline Wethington	United States	D	University of Minnesota	WCHA
2025	1	5	Rory Guilday	United States	D	Cornell University	ECAC
2025	2	13	Anna Shokhina	Russia	F	Dynamo-Neva St. Petersburg	ZhHL
2025	3	21	Sarah Wozniewicz	Canada	F	University of Wisconsin	WCHA
2025	4	29	Peyton Hemp	United States	F	University of Minnesota	WCHA
2025	5	37	Sanni Ahola	Finland	G	St. Cloud State University	WCHA
2025	6	45	Fanuza Kadirova	Russia	D	Dynamo-Neva St. Petersburg	ZhHL
2026	1	11	Vivian Jungels	United States	D	University of Wisconsin	WCHA
2026	2	23	Jordan Ray	United States	F	Yale University	ECAC
2026	3	35	Tereza Pištěková	Czech Republic	F	SDE Hockey	SDHL
2026	4	47	Tory Mariano	United States	D	Northeastern University	Hockey East
2026	5	59	Neena Brick	Canada	F	Modo	SDHL
2026	6	71	Taylor Otremba	United States	F	Minnesota State University	WCHA
