= List of Ottawa Charge players =

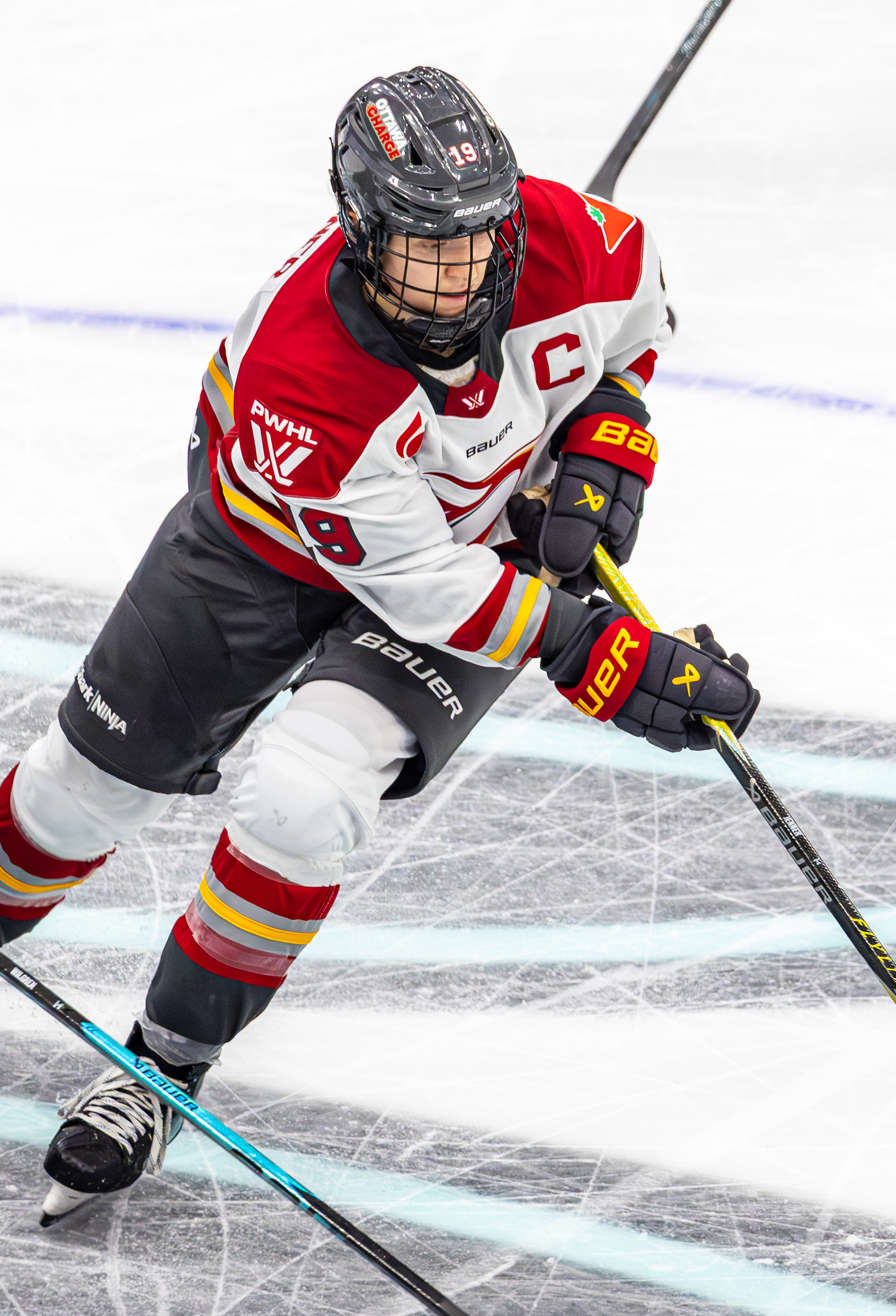
Brianne Jenner, the franchise's first captain.

The Ottawa Charge are a professional women's ice hockey team based in Ottawa, Ontario, Canada, and compete in the Professional Women's Hockey League (PWHL). Founded on August 29, 2023, the Charge are one of the league's six original franchises. The team plays its home games at TD Place Arena in Lansdowne Park, and represents one of the premier professional sports organizations in Canada's capital alongside the NHL's Ottawa Senators and the CFL's Ottawa Redblacks. As one of the PWHL's three original Canadian franchises, the Charge have played a prominent role in the league's development and growth since its inception.

The franchise competed under the temporary name "PWHL Ottawa" during the league's inaugural season before unveiling its permanent identity as the Ottawa Charge on September 9, 2024. The name was selected to reflect energy, momentum, and determination, qualities associated with both the city and the sport of hockey. The club's colours—Electric Red, Capital Black, and Velocity Silver—and its stylized "C" crest were designed to symbolize speed, strength, and forward motion, reinforcing the team's connection to Ottawa and its competitive identity.

Ottawa built its inaugural roster around Canadian national team players Brianne Jenner, Emily Clark, Emerance Maschmeyer, and Ashton Bell. Jenner was named the franchise's first captain, while Maschmeyer emerged as one of the league's top goaltenders and Bell became a key part of the team's defensive core. They opened the inaugural PWHL season on January 2, 2024, against Montreal. Hayley Scamurra scored the first goal in franchise history during the contest, while Ottawa earned its first victory on January 13, defeating Toronto 5–1 behind a strong performance from Maschmeyer. On March 21, 2024, Maschmeyer recorded the first shutout in franchise history, making 26 saves in a victory over New York. Although Ottawa narrowly missed qualifying for the playoffs in its inaugural campaign, the team established a strong foundation and quickly developed rivalries with fellow Canadian clubs Montreal and Toronto.

The Charge reached new heights during the 2024–25 PWHL season, earning their first playoff berth and advancing to the Walter Cup Final. Rookie goaltender Gwyneth Philips starred during the postseason, helping Ottawa upset the regular-season champion Montreal Victoire and earning the Ilana Kloss Playoff Most Valuable Player award. Ottawa ultimately fell in four games in the Final, while Rebecca Leslie received the 2025 Intact Impact Award, recognizing her leadership, community involvement, and contributions both on and off the ice.

In the 2025–26 PWHL season, Ottawa returned to the Walter Cup Final despite losing key players through expansion. Rookies Sarah Wozniewicz and Fanuza Kadirova played important roles in a semifinal upset of the Boston Fleet, though the Charge were again defeated by the Montreal Victoire in four games. Consecutive appearances in the 2025 and 2026 Walter Cup Finals helped establish Ottawa as one of the PWHL's leading franchises and a consistent championship contender.

As of the conclusion of the 2025–26 PWHL season, a total of 55 different players have played at least one game for the franchise; of them, 5 are goaltenders, while 50 are skaters.

== Key ==
Key of colours and symbols
#	Number worn for majority of tenure with the Charge
WC	Walter Cup Champion
*	Current member of the Charge organization (including reserves)
†	Walter Cup champion, retired jersey, or elected to the Hockey Hall of Fame

Skaters
Pos	Position
D	Defender
F	Forward

The seasons column lists the first year of the season of the player's first game and the last year of the season of the player's last game. For example, a player who played one game in the 2023–24 season would be listed as playing with the team from 2023–24, regardless of what calendar year the game occurred within.

Statistics are complete to the end of the 2025–26 PWHL season.

== Goaltenders ==
Note: GP = Games played; Min, TOI = Minutes played; W = Wins; L = Losses; OTL = Overtime losses; GA = Goals-against; GAA = Goals-against average; SO = Shutouts; SV% = Save percentage;

Name	#	Nationality	Seasons	Regular season							Playoffs						Notes
Name	#	Nationality	Seasons	GP	W	L	OTL	SO	GAA	SV%	GP	W	L	SO	GAA	SV%	Notes
Abstreiter, Sandra	30	Germany	2023–2024	3	0	0	1	0	3.08	.913	0	0	0	0	0.00	.000	
Ahola, Sanni*	1	Finland	2025–present	2	1	1	0	0	1.93	.927	0	0	0	0	0.00	.000	
Maschmeyer, Emerance	38	Canada	2023–2025	41	15	16	6	2	2.42	.914	0	0	0	0	0.00	.000	
Philips, Gwyneth*	33	United States	2024–present	43	24	16	2	5	2.12	.928	16	8	8	1	1.57	.941	Ilana Kloss Playoff MVP 2025
Woodland, Kendra*	70	Canada	2025–present	1	0	0	0	0	2.66	.875	0	0	0	0	0.00	.000	

== Skaters ==
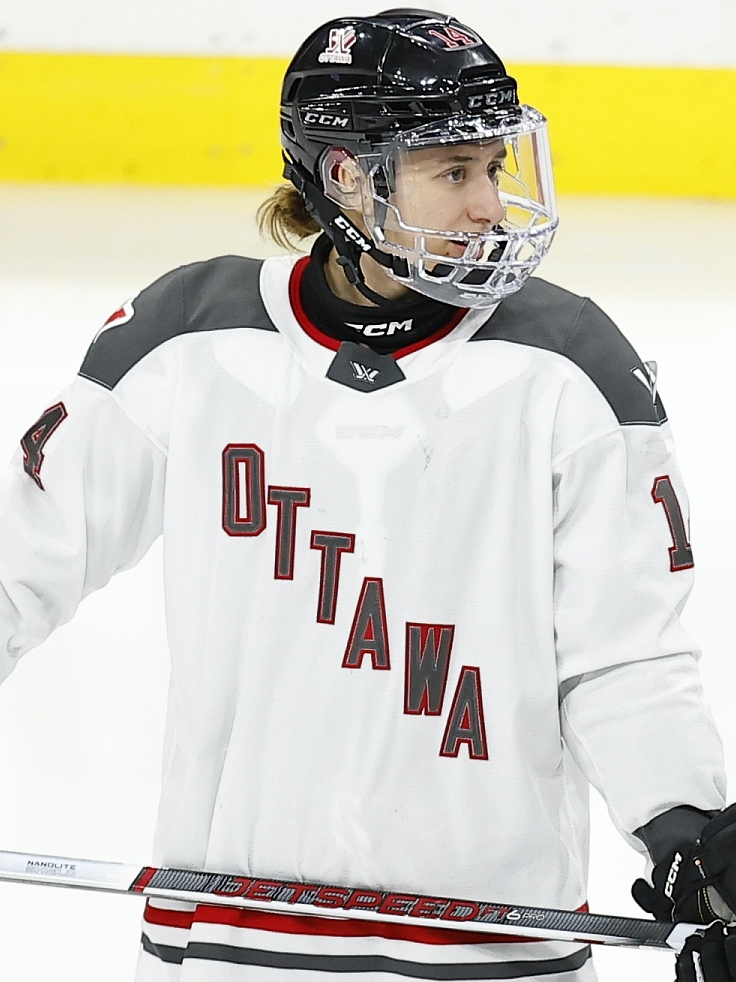
Hayley Scamurra scored the first goal in franchise history against PWHL Montreal.

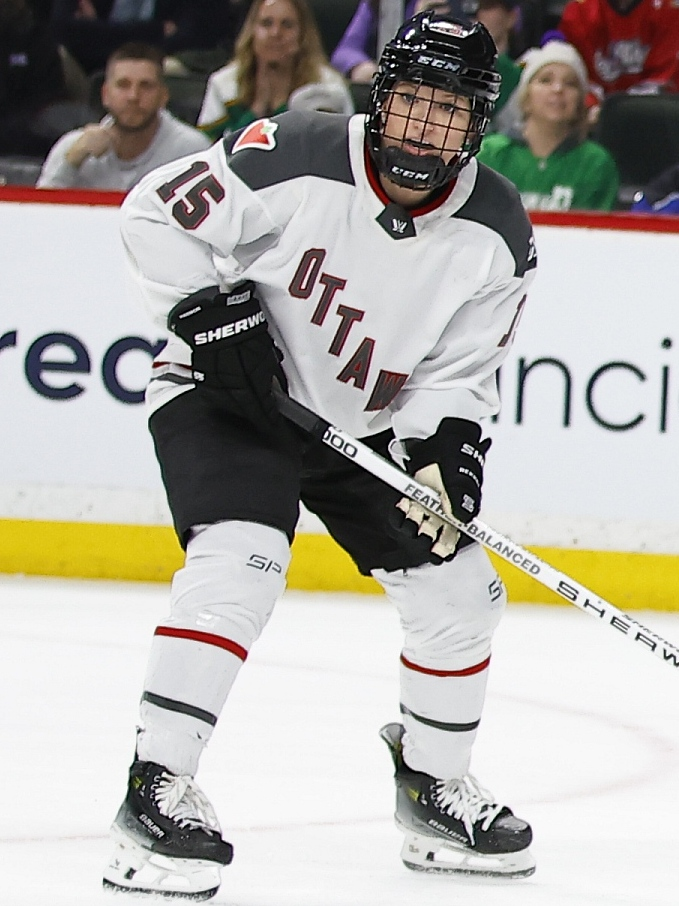
Savannah Harmon was the franchise's first ever draft choice, selected 5th overall in the inaugural PWHL draft.

Note: GP = Games played; G = Goals; A = Assists; Pts = Points; PIM = Penalty minutes;

Name	#	Nationality	Pos	Seasons	Regular season					Playoffs					Notes
Name	#	Nationality	Pos	Seasons	GP	G	A	Pts	PIM	GP	G	A	Pts	PIM	Notes
Adolfsson, Jessica	9	Sweden	D	2024–2025	1	0	0	0	0	0	0	0	0	0	
Adzija, Lexie	88	Canada	F	2023–2024	17	5	3	8	4	0	0	0	0	0	
Bach, Victoria	12	Canada	F	2024–2025	24	2	3	5	4	8	0	0	0	0	
Bell, Ashton	21	Canada	D	2023–2025	51	5	8	13	2	8	1	1	2	0	
Boulier, Amanda	28	United States	D	2023–2024	17	1	5	6	2	0	0	0	0	0	
Boyd, Zoe	3	Canada	D	2023–2025	39	0	6	6	27	8	0	0	0	4	
Buckles, Emma	24	Canada	D	2023–2024	15	0	0	0	0	0	0	0	0	0	
Cava, Michela*	86	Canada	F	2025–present	17	0	4	4	6	8	1	2	3	0	
Clark, Emily	26	Canada	F	2023–2026	84	16	27	43	24	16	3	2	5	6	
Darkangelo, Shiann	27	United States	F	2023–2025	36	8	9	17	16	8	1	0	1	0	
Davis, Sammy	20	United States	F	2023–2024	9	0	0	0	0	0	0	0	0	0	
Della Rovere, Kristin	25	Canada	F	2023–2024	9	1	0	1	0	0	0	0	0	0	
Demers, Rosalie	81	Canada	F	2023–2024	13	0	0	0	4	0	0	0	0	0	
Garát-Gasparics, Fanni	94	Hungary	F	2023–2024	15	1	0	1	4	0	0	0	0	0	
Gilmore, Becca	10	United States	F	2023–2024	22	0	3	3	2	0	0	0	0	0	
Grant-Mentis, Mikyla	13	Canada	F	2023–2024	6	0	3	3	0	0	0	0	0	0	
Greco, Emma*	25	Canada	D	2025–present	17	0	2	2	6	8	0	0	0	2	
Guilday, Rory	5	United States	D	2025–2026	30	1	8	9	18	8	0	2	2	8	
Harmon, Savannah	15	United States	D	2023–2025	30	3	9	12	8	0	0	0	0	0	
Hemp, Peyton	29	United States	F	2025–2026	30	2	7	9	31	8	1	0	1	2	
Hobson, Brooke*	11	Canada	D	2025–present	23	1	3	4	8	8	1	0	1	4	
House, Taylor	22	United States	F	2024–2026	44	1	1	2	10	13	0	1	1	4	
Howran, Victoria	5	Canada	D	2023–2024	1	0	0	0	0	0	0	0	0	0	
Hughes, Gabbie*	17	United States	F	2023–present	81	19	25	44	52	16	1	4	5	8	
Isbell, Samantha	5	Canada	F	2023–2026	19	0	1	1	2	4	0	0	0	0	
Jenner, Brianne	19	Canada	F	2023–2026	82	28	33	61	20	16	2	2	4	12	Captain 2023–2026
Kadirova, Fanuza*	71	Russia	F	2025–present	28	10	2	12	14	8	2	3	5	2	
Larocque, Jocelyne*	23	Canada	D	2024–present	54	1	12	13	30	16	2	6	8	6	Captain 2026– present
Leslie, Rebecca*	37	Canada	F	2024–present	57	15	11	26	14	16	6	3	9	8	Hockey For All Award 2026; Intact Impact Award 2025
Markowski, Stephanie	6	Canada	D	2024–2026	58	2	8	10	16	16	0	0	0	2	
McMahon, Mannon	18	United States	F	2024–2026	43	5	5	10	14	8	1	0	1	0	
McQuigge, Brooke*	27	Canada	F	2025–present	17	0	1	1	4	8	0	0	0	0	
Meixner, Anna	94	Austria	F	2024–2026	41	3	1	4	12	8	0	2	2	0	
Mrázová, Kateřina*	16	Czech Republic	F	2023–present	67	11	23	34	30	14	0	2	2	0	
Poniatovskaia, Vita*	9	Russia	D	2025–present	7	0	0	0	2	0	0	0	0	0	
Reilly, Kate*	8	Canada	D	2025–present	25	0	4	4	16	8	0	0	0	2	
Roese, Jincy	71	United States	D	2023–2025	51	3	16	19	28	1	0	0	0	0	
Savolainen, Ronja*	88	Finland	D	2024–present	58	6	15	21	28	16	2	3	5	10	
Scamurra, Hayley	14	United States	F	2023–2025	30	5	5	10	6	0	0	0	0	0	
Schneider, Malia	18	Canada	F	2023–2024	2	0	0	0	0	0	0	0	0	0	
Serdachny, Danielle	92	Canada	F	2024–2025	30	2	6	8	18	8	0	2	2	2	
Shiga, Akane	11	Japan	F	2023–2024	24	2	0	2	4	0	0	0	0	0	
Shokhina, Anna	97	Russia	F	2025–2026	12	1	3	4	4	0	0	0	0	0	
Snodgrass, Natalie	8	United States	F	2023–2025	44	2	6	8	12	0	0	0	0	0	
Tejralová, Aneta	2	Czech Republic	D	2023–2025	53	3	15	18	26	8	1	1	2	0	
Vanišová, Tereza	13	Czech Republic	F	2023–2025	36	15	9	24	59	8	1	3	4	8	
Vasko, Alexa	10	Canada	F	2024–2026	54	4	3	7	18	16	0	0	0	0	
Wallin, Olivia	14	Canada	F	2025–2026	2	0	0	0	0	0	0	0	0	0	
Watts, Daryl	9	Canada	F	2023–2024	24	10	7	17	8	0	0	0	0	0	
Wozniewicz, Sarah*	23	Canada	F	2025–present	30	7	6	13	8	8	2	2	4	2	
