= List of PWHL statistical leaders by country of birth =

This is a list of Professional Women's Hockey League statistical leaders by country of birth, sorted by total points. The top ten players from each country are included. Statistics are current through the end of the 2025–26 PWHL season and players currently playing in the Professional Women's Hockey League are marked in boldface.

All players are listed by the current country of the players' birth location, regardless of their citizenship, where they were trained in hockey or what country they represented internationally.

== Country ==
=== Canada ===
Rank	Name	Team(s)	GP	Pts	PPG
1	**Marie-Philip Poulin**	MTL	70	67	0.96
2	**Daryl Watts**	OTT, TOR	81	63	0.78
3	**Laura Stacey**	MTL	80	62	0.78
4	**Brianne Jenner**	OTT	82	61	0.74
5	**Jessie Eldridge**	NY, SEA, BOS	84	61	0.73
6	**Hannah Miller** (Note: Hannah Miller was born in North Vancouver, British Columbia, and has played internationally for both Canada and China.)	TOR, VAN	82	56	0.68
7	**Sarah Fillier**	NY	59	52	0.88
8	**Sarah Nurse**	TOR, VAN	64	52	0.81
9	**Sophie Jaques** (D)	BOS, MIN, VAN	77	52	0.68
10	**Renata Fast** (D)	TOR	80	45	0.56

=== United States ===
Rank	Name	Team(s)	GP	Pts	PPG
1	**Taylor Heise**	MIN	78	65	0.83
2	**Alex Carpenter**	NY, SEA	80	63	0.79
3	**Kendall Coyne Schofield**	MIN	77	63	0.82
4	**Kelly Pannek**	MIN	84	60	0.71
5	**Hilary Knight**	BOS, SEA	76	54	0.71
6	**Grace Zumwinkle**	MIN	75	52	0.69
7	**Abby Roque**	NY, MTL	83	52	0.63
8	**Megan Keller** (D)	BOS	84	50	0.60
9	**Britta Curl-Salemme**	MIN	58	44	0.76
10	**Gabbie Hughes**	OTT	81	44	0.54

=== Switzerland ===
Rank	Name	Team(s)	GP	Pts	PPG
1	**Alina Müller**	BOS	80	56	0.70
2	**Nicole Vallario** (D)	NY	11	3	0.27

=== Czechia ===
Rank	Name	Team(s)	GP	Pts	PPG
1	**Tereza Vanišová**	MTL, OTT, VAN	83	49	0.59
2	**Kateřina Mrázová**	OTT	67	34	0.51
3	**Aneta Tejralová** (D)	OTT, SEA	76	26	0.34
4	**Denisa Křížová**	MIN, NY	84	22	0.26
5	**Kristýna Kaltounková**	NY	21	12	0.57
6	**Natálie Mlýnková**	MTL	30	10	0.33
7	**Klára Hymlárová**	MIN	58	10	0.17
8	**Daniela Pejšová** (D)	BOS	55	7	0.13

=== Finland ===
Rank	Name	Team(s)	GP	Pts	PPG
1	**Susanna Tapani**	MIN, BOS	86	49	0.57
2	**Ronja Savolainen** (D)	OTT	58	21	0.36
3	Noora Tulus	NY	30	2	0.07

=== Austria ===
Rank	Name	Team(s)	GP	Pts	PPG
1	**Theresa Schafzahl**	BOS, SEA	80	26	0.33
2	Anna Meixner	OTT, VAN	58	8	0.14

=== Sweden ===
Rank	Name	Team(s)	GP	Pts	PPG
1	**Maja Nylén Persson** (D)	NY	53	17	0.32
2	**Lina Ljungblom**	MTL	50	15	0.30
3	**Anna Kjellbin** (D)	MTL, TOR	55	7	0.13
4	**Sara Hjalmarsson**	TOR	30	3	0.10

=== Russia ===
Rank	Name	Team(s)	GP	Pts	PPG
1	**Fanuza Kadirova**	OTT	28	12	0.43
2	**Anna Shokhina**	OTT, VAN	28	5	0.18

=== France ===
Rank	Name	Team(s)	GP	Pts	PPG
1	Chloé Aurard-Bushee	NY	48	12	0.25

=== Denmark ===
Rank	Name	Team(s)	GP	Pts	PPG
1	**Michelle Karvinen** (Note: Michelle Karvinen was born in Rødovre, Denmark, and holds dual Danish-Finnish citizenship. She plays internationally for Finland.)	VAN	30	9	0.30

=== Germany ===
Rank	Name	Team(s)	GP	Pts	PPG
1	**Laura Kluge**	TOR, BOS	38	4	0.11

=== Japan ===
Rank	Name	Team(s)	GP	Pts	PPG
1	**Akane** **Shiga**	OTT	24	2	0.08

=== Hungary ===
Rank	Name	Team(s)	GP	Pts	PPG
1	Fanni Garát-Gasparics	OTT	15	1	0.07
