= Victoria Bach =

Canadian ice hockey player (born 1996)

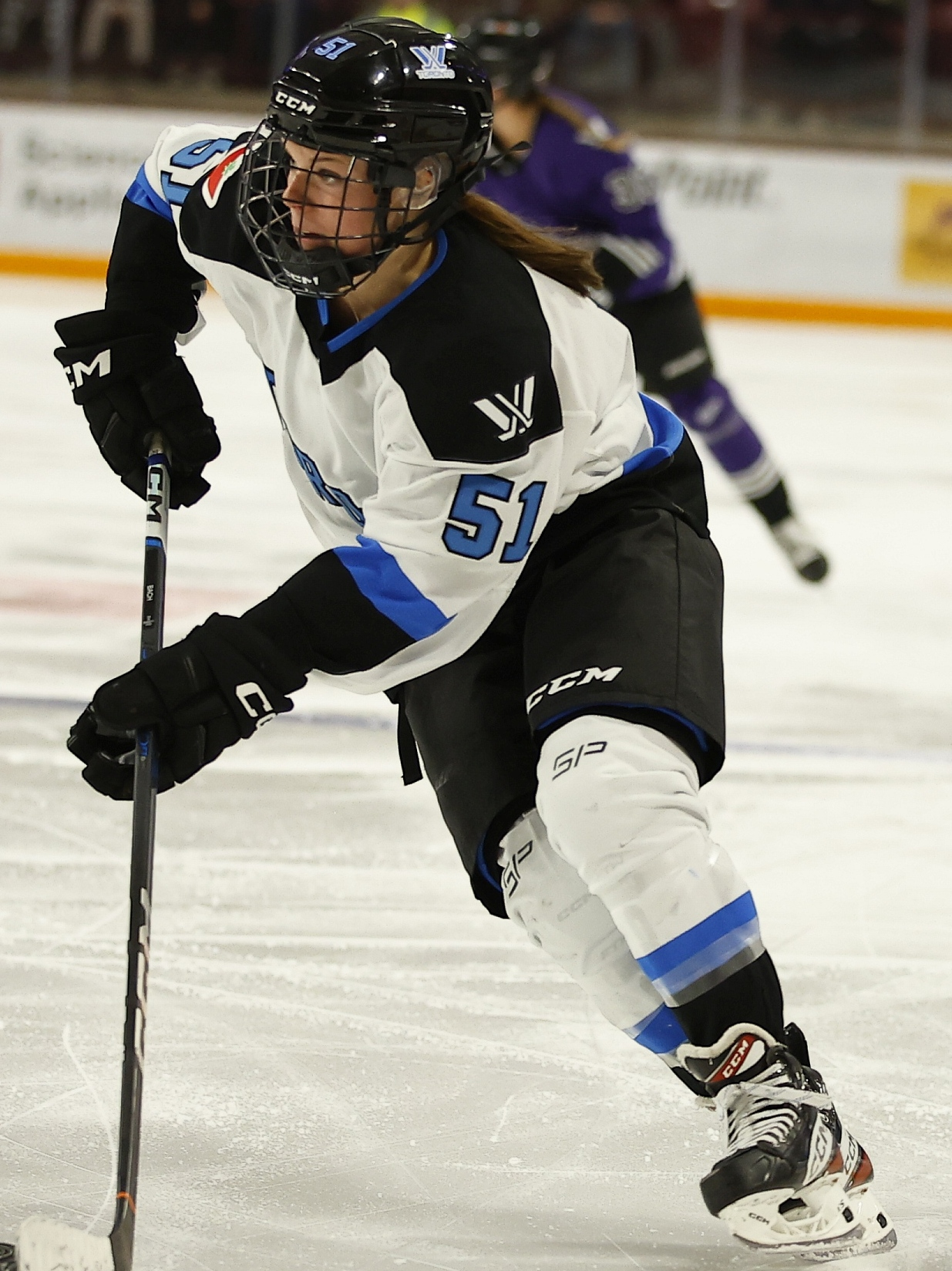
- Bach with PWHL Toronto in 2024
- Born: July 12, 1996 (age 30) Milton, Ontario
- Height: 5 ft 4 in (163 cm)
- Weight: 121 lb (55 kg; 8 st 9 lb)
- Position: Forward
- Shot: Left
- Played for: Ottawa Charge; Toronto Sceptres; Markham Thunder; Boston University Terriers (NCAA)
- National team: Canada
- Playing career: 2012–2025
Medal record
Women's ice hockey
Representing Canada
Olympic Games
Gold medal – first place	2022 Beijing	Team
World Championships
Gold medal – first place	2021 Canada
Gold medal – first place	2022 Denmark
4 Nations Cup
Silver medal – second place	2018 Canada

Victoria Bach (born July 12, 1996) is a Canadian former professional ice hockey player who most recently played for the Ottawa Charge of the Professional Women's Hockey League (PWHL) and was a member of Canada women's national ice hockey team. A graduate of Boston University, she was the first player in Boston University history to score more than 100 goals. She previously played in the Canadian Women's Hockey League (CWHL) with the Markham Thunder, and received the CWHL's 2018–2020 Rookie of the Year award.

== Playing career ==
=== University ===
Across 145 NCAA games, Bach scored 198 points, setting all-time points and goals record for Boston University. She was the first woman in the university's history to score 100 career goals. In her senior year, she tallied 67 points in 33 games.

Bach won the Hockey East Rookie of the Year in 2014–2015. She was the second Terrier player to win the award in the program's history; teammate Marie-Philip Poulin won the award in 2010–2011. She was a Hockey East First Team All-Star in 2017 and 2018, and was a top-3 finalist for the 2018 Patty Kazmaier Award.

=== Professional ===
In 2017, Bach was selected 7th overall by the Metropolitan Riveters in the NWHL draft. She was then selected by the Markham Thunder in the 1st round of the 2018 CWHL Draft, the team with whom she would sign her first professional contract. In 2018–19, she won the CWHL Rookie of the Year Award, putting up 32 points in 26 games with Markham, her 19 goals good for second in the league.

After the collapse of the CWHL in May 2019, she joined the PWHPA.

Following four seasons in the PWHPA, Bach was drafted in the seventh round of the 2023 PWHL Draft by Toronto. Her first PWHL game took place on February 3, 2024, as Toronto hosted Minnesota. Thirteen days later, Bach recorded her first goal in league play, scoring in the third period of a 3-0 shutout win against Montreal. She finished the season with five points.

On December 30, 2024, Toronto traded Bach to the Ottawa Charge, alongside Jocelyne Larocque ( also a former teammate with the Markham Thunder), in exchange for Savannah Harmon and Hayley Scamurra. Of note, it marked the first trade of the 2024–25 PWHL season.

Coincidentally, Bach's debut with Ottawa took place on Toronto ice in a December 31 match. Her first goal as a member of the Charge occurred on January 11, 2025, versus the Boston Fleet. Larocque would earn one of the assists.

On June 1, 2025, Bach announced her retirement.

=== International ===
Bach played for Team Canada at the 2014 IIHF World Women's U18 Championship, winning a gold medal. She made her debut for the senior Canada women's national ice hockey team at the 2017 4 Nations Cup. She then served as assistant captain for the country at the 2018 4 Nations Cup. In the 2019–2020 Team Canada season, Victoria was promoted to play on a line with Marie-Philip Poulin. During the 2019–2020 Rivalry Series, she was the top scoring Canadian player. She was named to the Canadian World Champhionships roster for the first time in 2020, before the tournament was cancelled due to the COVID-19 pandemic. She was one of 28 players invited to Hockey Canada's Centralization Camp, which represented the selection process for the Canadian women's team that competed in Ice hockey at the 2022 Winter Olympics.

== Personal life ==
Bach was born in Ontario, Canada. She is a member of the Mohawks of the Bay of Quinte First Nation. As a young woman, she started playing soccer; she switched to hockey after watching Team Canada win the gold medal in women's ice hockey at the 2002 Winter Olympic Games.

At Boston University, she completed a bachelor's degree in communication.

== Career statistics ==
			Regular season					Playoffs
Season	Team	League	GP	G	A	Pts	PIM	GP	G	A	Pts	PIM
2010–11	Oakville Hornets	Prov. WHL	19	3	5	8	0	2	0	1	1	0
2011–12	Oakville Hornets	Prov. WHL	34	19	10	29	14	8	9	1	10	2
2012–13	Mississauga Chiefs	Prov. WHL	33	24	25	49	27	13	4	3	7	4
2013–14	Mississauga Chiefs	Prov. WHL	35	36	32	68	8	7	3	7	10	25
2014–15	Boston University Terriers	Hockey East	37	20	14	34	4	–	–	–	–	–
2015–16	Boston University Terriers	Hockey East	39	22	26	48	6	–	–	–	–	–
2016–17	Boston University Terriers	Hockey East	36	23	26	49	42	–	–	–	–	–
2017–18	Boston University Terriers	Hockey East	33	39	28	67	12	–	–	–	–	–
2018–19	Markham Thunder	CWHL	26	19	13	32	6	3	0	1	1	0
2019–20	GTA East	PWHPA	–	–	–	–	–	–	–	–	–	–
2020–21	Toronto	PWHPA	4	2	4	6	2	–	–	–	–	–
2021–22	Toronto	PWHPA	6	5	3	8	2	–	–	–	–	–
2022–23	Team Scotiabank	PWHPA	20	6	5	11	28	–	–	–	–	–
2023–24	PWHL Toronto	PWHL	16	2	3	5	2	5	0	1	1	0
2024–25	Toronto Sceptres	PWHL	6	0	0	0	0	–	–	–	–	–
2024–25	Ottawa Charge	PWHL	24	2	3	5	4	8	0	0	0	0
CWHL totals			26	19	13	32	6	3	0	1	1	0
PWHL totals			46	4	6	10	8	13	0	1	1	0
