= Michael Hirshfeld =

Canadian ice hockey executive

Michael Hirshfeld is a Canadian ice hockey executive. He currently holds the position of General Manager for the Ottawa Charge of the Professional Women's Hockey League (PWHL).

== Career ==
Hirshfeld has also served as the executive director of the NHL Coaches' Association from 2016 to 2023. His sports career began in a media relations with the Ottawa Lynx, Ottawa’s minor-league baseball team and Montreal Expos affiliate.
