= Taylor Otremba =

American ice hockey player (born 2003)

- Born: December 23, 2003 (age 22) Lakeville, Minnesota, U.S.
- Height: 5 ft 5 in (165 cm)
- Position: Forward
- Shoots: Left
- PWHL team: Ottawa Charge
- Playing career: 2026–present

Taylor Otremba (born December 23, 2003) is an American professional ice hockey forward drafted by the Ottawa Charge of the Professional Women's Hockey League (PWHL). She played college ice hockey at Minnesota State.

== Playing career ==
With the Lakeville South Cougars, Otremba racked up 70 goals and 128 points in 95 games.

=== College ===
As a freshman in 2022-23, she played in 36 games. Finishing the season with 20 points, she also scored three game winning goals. Earning a place on the WCHA All-Rookie Team, she became the eighth player in program history to achieve this. She was named WCHA Rookie of the Month in January 2023.

During the 2025-26 season, Otremba served as team captain for the Mavericks. She appeared in all 38 games, ranking second on the team with 23 points. Of note, the program enjoyed a record 17 wins.

=== Professional ===
On June 17, 2026, Otremba was selected seventy-first overall in the 2026 PWHL Draft.

== Awards and honors ==
- WCHA All-Rookie Team (2022–23)
- WCHA All-Academic Team (2024–25, 2025–26)
- WCHA Scholar Athlete (2023–24, 2024–25, 2025–26)

== Personal life ==
Otremba is the granddaughter of former NCAA hockey player and coach Dean Blais.
