= Pierre Groulx =

Pierre Groulx (born December 15, 1975) became in 2009 the goaltender coach of the Montreal Canadiens. On July 6, 2009, general manager Bob Gainey made the official announcement. He supplements the personnel of head coach Michel Therrien and assistants Gerard Gallant, J. J. Daigneault and Clement Jodoin. Pierre Groulx spent the previous four seasons with the Florida Panthers, first working under Jacques Martin and later, in 2008–2009, under Peter DeBoer. In his first two years with the Panthers, Groulx was in charge of video. In 2007–2008, he attained the functions of assistant trainer and goalkeeper trainer. Groulx started his career with the Ottawa Senators (also in charge of video) staying with the club for 5 years. In addition to his involvement with the Ottawa Senators and the Florida Panthers, Groulx assumed a presence on the international scene with Team Canada at the 2005 world championships in Austria.

On June 17, 2016, Groulx was re-hired by the Ottawa Senators to serve as a goalie coach, reuniting him with goalie Craig Anderson, the two of them having been together with the Florida Panthers.

In 2024, Groulx joined PWHL Ottawa as the goalie coach.
