= Reece Hunt =

Canadian ice hockey player (born 2001)

- Born: March 19, 2001 (age 25) Nelson, British Columbia, Canada
- Height: 5 ft 5 in (165 cm)
- Position: Forward
- Shoots: Left
- PWHL team Former teams: Ottawa Charge; Luleå HF
- Playing career: 2024–present

Reece Hunt (born March 19, 2001) is Canadian professional ice hockey forward serving as a reserve player for the Ottawa Charge of the Professional Women's Hockey League (PWHL). She previously played for Luleå HF in the Swedish Women's Hockey League (SDHL). She played college ice hockey at Bemidji State University and the University of Minnesota-Duluth.

== Playing career ==
=== College ===
Hunt played five seasons of college ice hockey. She began her career with the Bemidji Beavers, and was named to the All-WCHA Rookie Team following her freshman year. She was the WCHA Rookie of the Week for March 3, 2020, and was named WCHA Forward of the Week for December 6, 2021. In her junior and senior seasons, she led the Beavers in scoring, and in her senior year, she served as team captain.

Hunt used her final year of eligibility at the University of Minnesota-Duluth. For her performance starting the season, she was the WCHA Forward of the Week for October 30, 2023, which she again achieved in February that same season. She scored her second-ever hat-trick against her former team, Bemidji. She tallied 35 points (18G, 16A) in 39 games with Duluth. Throughout her NCAA career, she appeared in 165 games, scoring 93 points (38G, 55A).

=== Professional ===
Following college, Hunt signed with Luleå HF ahead of the 2024–25 SDHL season. Across six games, she scored eight points on five goals and three assists. Her season ended prematurely with a knee injury.

In November 2025, she signed as a reserve player with the Ottawa Charge for the 2025–26 PWHL season. Her college teammate Mannon McMahon also plays for the Charge.

== Personal life ==
Hunt's brother, Dryden Hunt plays for the Calgary Wranglers in the American Hockey League.

Hunt majored in business administration and minored in communications.

== Career statistics ==
Note: GP = Games played; G = Goals; A = Assists; Pts = Points; PIM = Penalty minutes;

			Regular season					Playoffs
Season	Team	League	GP	G	A	Pts	PIM	GP	G	A	Pts	PIM
2019–20	Bemidji State Beavers	WCHA	37	7	12	19	10	—	—	—	—	—
2020–21	Bemidji State Beavers	WCHA	19	0	8	8	16	—	—	—	—	—
2021–22	Bemidji State Beavers	WCHA	34	7	13	20	14	—	—	—	—	—
2022–23	Bemidji State Beavers	WCHA	36	6	6	12	16	—	—	—	—	—
2023–24	Minnesota Duluth Bulldogs	WCHA	39	18	16	34	18	—	—	—	—	—
2024–25	Luleå HF	SDHL	6	5	3	8	8	—	—	—	—	—
NCAA totals			165	38	55	93	74	—	—	—	—	—
SDHL totals			6	5	3	8	8	—	—	—	—	—
