= Carla MacLeod =

Canadian ice hockey player

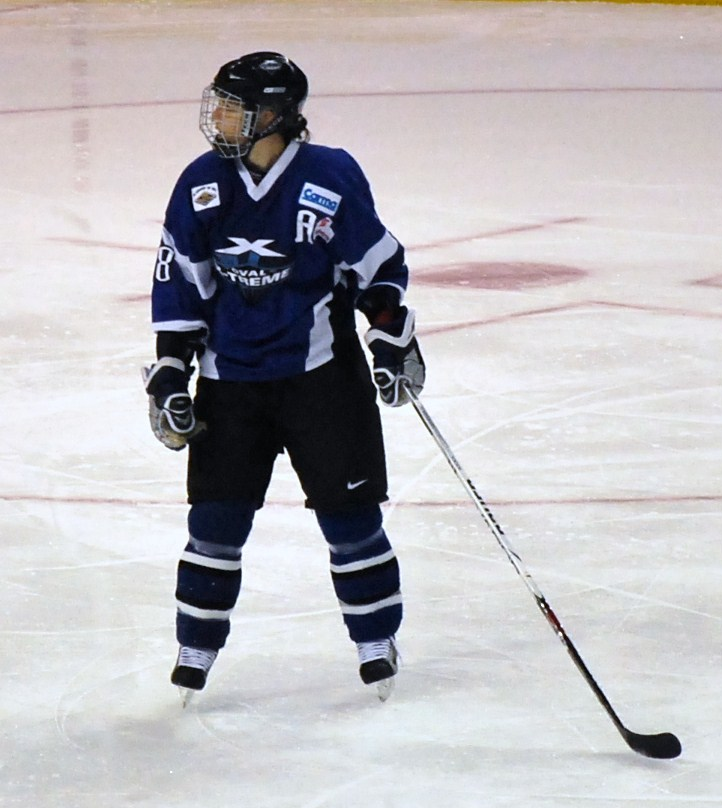
- MacLeod with the Calgary Oval X-Treme in 2009
- Born: June 16, 1982 (age 44) Spruce Grove, Alberta, Canada
- Height: 5 ft 4 in (163 cm)
- Weight: 133 lb (60 kg; 9 st 7 lb)
- Position: Defence
- Shot: Right
- Played for: Wisconsin Badgers; Calgary Oval X-Treme
- Current PWHL coach National team coach: Ottawa Charge; Czechia (Former)
- Coached for: Calgary Dinos
- National team: Canada
- Playing career: 2003–2010
- Coaching career: 2006–present
Medal record
Women's ice hockey
Representing Canada
Olympic Games
Gold medal – first place	2006 Turin	Tournament
Gold medal – first place	2010 Vancouver	Tournament
World Championship
Gold medal – first place	2007 Canada	Tournament
Silver medal – second place	2005 Sweden	Tournament
Silver medal – second place	2008 China	Tournament
Silver medal – second place	2009 Finland	Tournament

Carla Rae MacLeod (born June 16, 1982) is a Canadian ice hockey coach and former member of the Canadian national women's hockey team. She is the current head coach of the Ottawa Charge in the Professional Women's Hockey League (PWHL) and former head coach of the Czech national ice hockey team.

== Playing career ==
MacLeod was born in Spruce Grove, Alberta. MacLeod attended Bishop Carroll High School in Calgary, Alberta.

Carla MacLeod represented Team Alberta at the National Championships in 1999 and 2001. On both occasions, MacLeod would win the Abby Hoffman Cup.

=== Wisconsin Badgers ===
She played with the Wisconsin Badgers women's ice hockey program in the Western Collegiate Hockey Association for four years, serving as captain for the 03-04 and 04-05 seasons. She played for United States women's Olympic team coach Mark Johnson at Wisconsin, where he likened her leadership to that of a second coach.

While at Wisconsin, MacLeod was bestowed with the University of Wisconsin Big Ten Medal of Honor (in recognition of athletic and academic achievement). In her senior year at Wisconsin, Macleod served as one of two undergraduate assistant coaches. The other undergrad coach was Olympian Molly Engstrom. Macleod and Engstrom assisted coach Mark Johnson with analysis of game footage.

=== Hockey Canada ===
Her career as a defenceman for the national team began in 2003 with a silver win in the Four Nations Cup. In 2004, she played to a gold medal in the Four Nations Cup. In 2005, MacLeod made her world championship debut. She had been cut from the world championship team for two consecutive years before that. MacLeod won silver at the 2005 IIHF Women's World Hockey Championship. In 2006, she played in the Winter Olympics in Turin, where she was named a tournament all-star, and in the 2006 Four Nations Cup, where Canada won gold. In 2007, she played in the IIHF Women's World Hockey Championship, where Canada won its ninth world's gold medal. Prior to joining the national women's team, MacLeod was on the National Under-22 team from 1999-2003.

=== Retirement ===
On September 14, 2010, Hockey Canada announced that MacLeod, along with three other players retired from international hockey. After her retirement, she took a public relations job with the Royal Bank of Canada.

== Coaching career ==
In the fall of 2010, she became an assistant coach with Mount Royal University. During the 2011–12 Canada women's national ice hockey team season, MacLeod was an assistant coach for the National Under 18 team that participated in a three-game series vs. the USA in August 2011. In February 2012, she began serving as an assistant coach for the Japanese national team. In February 2013, the Japanese national women's hockey team qualified for their first Olympics, going on to place 7th at the 2014 Winter Olympics in Sochi, Russia. Japanese media praised MacLeod for her coaching skills, likable personality, and tactical understanding of the game.

In April 2022, MacLeod became the head coach of the Czech Republic women's ice hockey team. During the subsequent 2022 Women's Ice Hockey World Championships, the Czechs won their first bronze medal. She returned as head coach for the Czech team for the 2025 IIHF Women's World Championship and the 2026 Winter Olympics.

In September 2023, MacLeod was named as head coach for the PWHL Ottawa team. On April 6 2026, she stepped away from her role with the Ottawa Charge for the final five regular season games as she continued treatment for breast cancer. She returned as head coach for the team's first game in the 2026 PWHL Playoffs against Boston on April 30.

== Personal life ==
She comes from a family of four children. Through her paternal grandmother, MacLeod is related to former Montreal Canadiens legend Maurice Richard.

MacLeod announced she has been diagnosed with breast cancer in November 2025.

== Career stats ==
Event	Games Played	Goals	Assists	Points	PIM
2005 World Championships	5	1	2	3	0
2006 Olympics	5	2	2	4	2
2007 World Championships	5	0	1	1	2
2008 World Championships	5	1	3	4	2
2009 World Championships	5	2	6	8	4
2010 Olympics	5	2	3	5	2

== Awards and honours ==
- 2004-05 USCHO.com Defensive Player of the Year
- 2025 Alberta Hockey Hall of Fame inductee.
