= Aneta Tejralová =

Czech ice hockey player (born 1996)

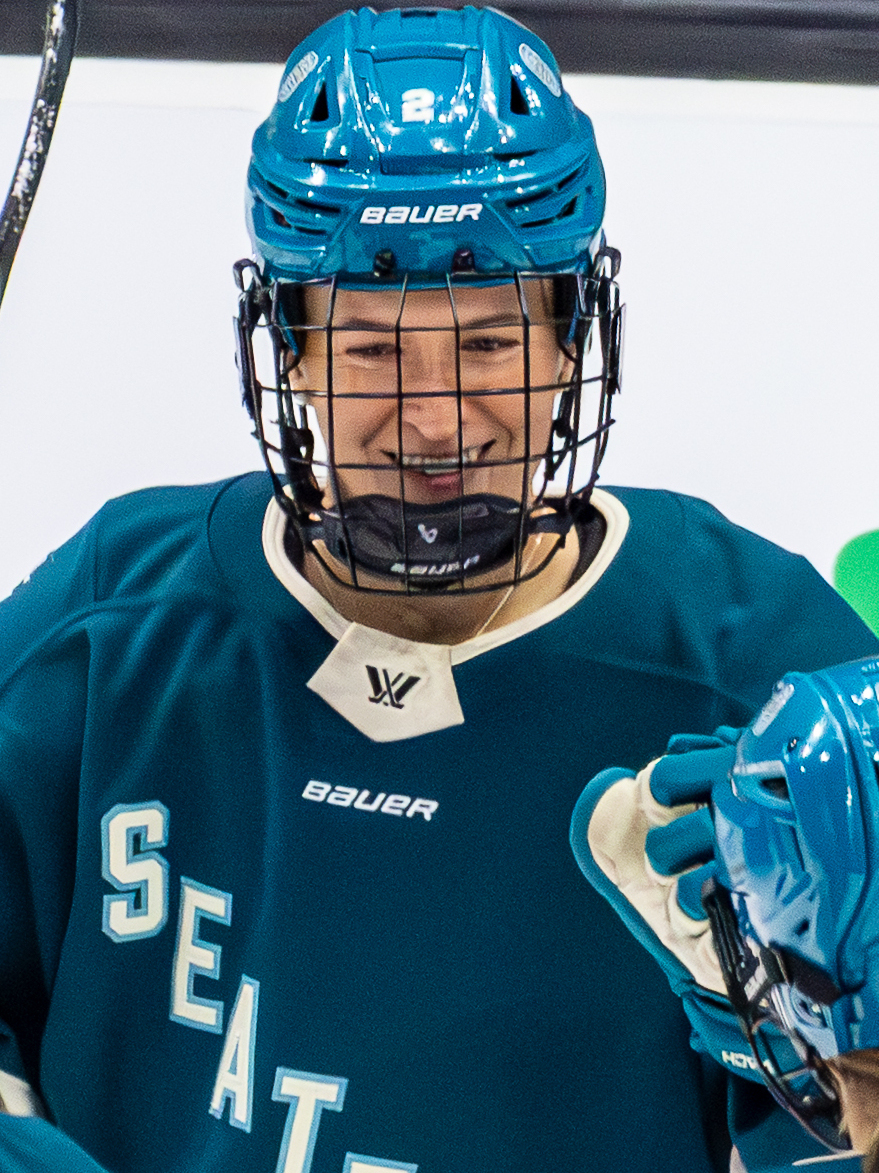
- Tejralová with the Seattle Torrent in 2026
- Born: 4 January 1996 (age 30) Prague, Czech Republic
- Height: 1.64 m (5 ft 5 in)
- Weight: 53 kg (117 lb; 8 st 5 lb)
- Position: Defence
- Shoots: Left
- PWHL team Former teams: Seattle Torrent: Ottawa Charge; MoDo Hockey; Boston Pride; SKIF Nizhny Novgorod; Dinamo St. Petersburg; HC Slavia Praha
- National team: Czech Republic
- Playing career: 2012–present
Medal record
World Championship
Bronze medal – third place	2022 Denmark
Bronze medal – third place	2023 Canada

Aneta Tejralová (AH-neh-tah-TAY-rah-LOH-vah; born 4 January 1996) is a Czech professional ice hockey player for the Seattle Torrent of the Professional Women's Hockey League (PWHL) and captain of the Czech Republic women's national ice hockey team. She previously played for the Ottawa Charge of the PWHL, the Boston Pride of the Premier Hockey Federation (PHF), MODO Hockey of the SDHL, and spent eight seasons in Russia's Zhenskaya Hockey League (ZhHL) with Dynamo St. Petersburg and SKIF Nizhny Novgorod.

Tejralová joined the Czech national team at age 15 in 2012 and has represented her country at the 2022 Winter Olympics and eight IIHF Women's World Championships. She was named Best Defenseman at the 2015 Division I A World Championship, selected as a Top 3 Player at the 2017 IIHF Women's World Championship, and helped Czechia win back-to-back bronze medals at the 2022 and 2023 World Championships—the country's first ever medals at the Top Division level. She became captain of the Czech national team prior to the 2023 World Championship.

In the PWHL, Tejralová was selected 41st overall by Ottawa in the 2023 PWHL Draft and was named the second-most productive defender on the team during the 2023–24 season. On 9 June 2025, she was the Seattle Torrent's first player selection (second overall) at the 2025 PWHL Expansion Draft.

== Early life ==
Tejralová was born on 4 January 1996, in Prague, Czech Republic. She has a twin brother, Petr Tejral, who played professional hockey in the Czech Republic. Watching her brother play inspired Tejralová to take up hockey at age six. She wanted to become a defender because she loved blocking shots. Tejralová grew up playing hockey for HC Slavia Praha in Prague, where she played in youth categories alongside boys of the same age, including her twin brother Petr. Tejralová credits her brother for some of her skating ability, noting that she often mirrors his skating technique.

== Playing career ==
=== Professional ===
==== Russia (2014–2022) ====
After playing domestically in the Czech Republic, Tejralová moved to Russia to play in the Zhenskaya Hockey League (ZhHL) beginning with the 2014–15 season. She joined Dynamo St. Petersburg in 2015 and served as an alternate captain for two seasons. In 2020, she moved to SKIF Nizhny Novgorod, where she also served as an alternate captain. During her time with SKIF, she recorded 64 points in 64 games, including 46 points in the 2021–22 season when she posted a +40 plus-minus rating through 36 games. She twice led the ZhHL in scoring by a defender.

==== Boston Pride (2022–23) ====
Tejralová made her North American professional debut with the Boston Pride of the Premier Hockey Federation (PHF) for the 2022–23 season. Pride head coach Paul Mara praised her signing, stating that she "will have an immediate impact in all three zones" and that her "talent, skill, and experience will have a great effect on our on-ice success."

Boston finished the regular season with a league-best 19-4-1 record, and Tejralová helped anchor a Pride defense that allowed the fewest goals in the league. She was selected to represent Team World at the 2023 PHF All-Star Game in Toronto on 29 January 2023, one of nine Pride players named to the 45-player all-star roster.

During the regular season, Tejralová scored two goals. Despite the Pride's strong regular season, the team was swept two games to none by the Minnesota Whitecaps in the semifinals.

==== MoDo Hockey (2023) ====
Prior to the inaugural PWHL season, Tejralová played for MODO Hockey in Sweden's SDHL during the fall of 2023, recording eight points in 13 games. Her contract with MoDo included an exit clause allowing her to join the PWHL in time for training camp.

==== Ottawa Charge (2023–25) ====
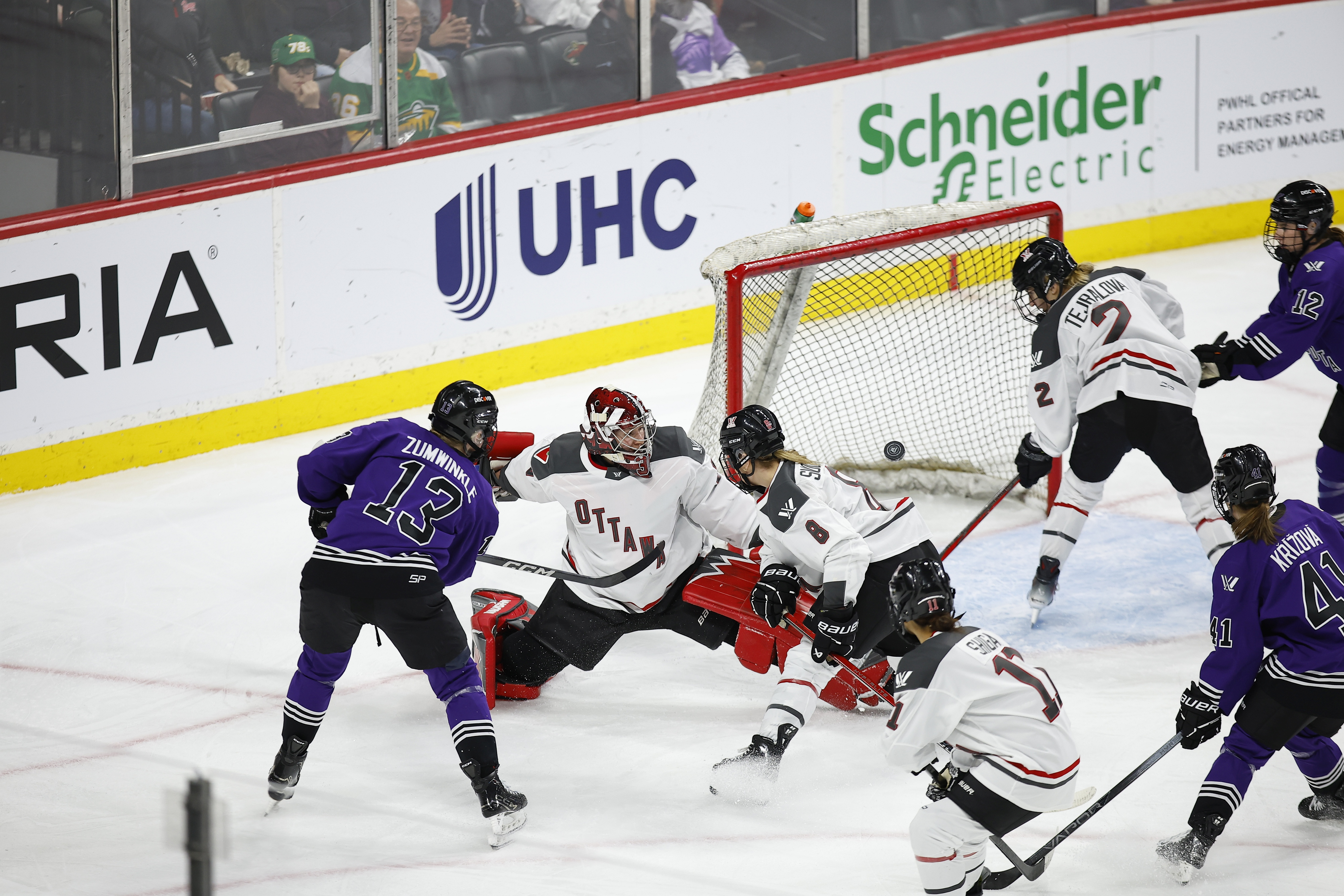
Tejralová during a game against the Minnesota Frost on 5 March 2024

Tejralová was selected 41st overall by PWHL Ottawa in the 2023 PWHL Draft. During the 2023–24 season she recorded two goals and six assists in 23 games. On 9 June 2024, she signed a two-year contract extension with Ottawa. She provided one goal and nine assists during the 2024–25 season.

==== Seattle Torrent (2025–present) ====
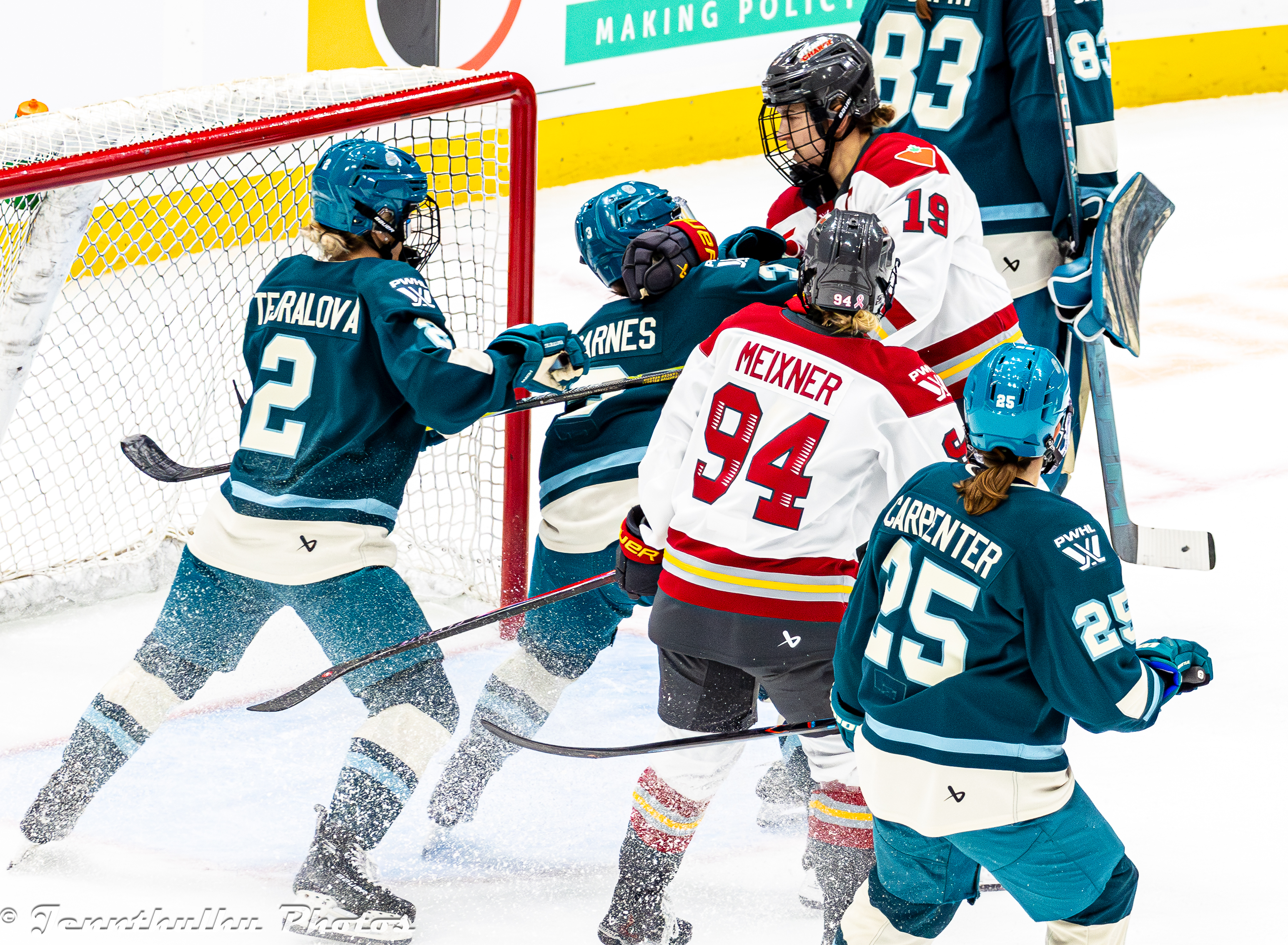
Tejralová (#2) during a Seattle Torrent game against the Ottawa Charge, December 17, 2025.

On 9 June 2025, Tejralová was drafted second overall by the Seattle Torrent in the 2025 PWHL Expansion Draft. She was Seattle's first selection in the expansion draft. On 28 November 2025, Tejralová was part of the Torrent's historic home opener at Climate Pledge Arena against the Minnesota Frost. The game drew 16,014 fans, breaking the record for the largest crowd for a women's hockey game in a U.S. arena. The attendance surpassed the previous U.S. record of 15,359 set at an NCAA game between Wisconsin and St. Cloud State on 14 January 2017, topped the U.S. record for a professional women's hockey game of 14,288, and became the highest-attended primary home venue game in PWHL history. Despite the record-setting crowd, Seattle fell 3–0 to the two-time defending Walter Cup champion Frost. On 21 December 2025, Tejralová recorded her first assist for the Torrent in a 3–1 loss to the Boston Fleet at Climate Pledge Arena. Tejralová assisted on Jessie Eldridge's goal with 26 seconds remaining in the third period, which spoiled goaltender Abbey Levy's shutout bid. On 28 December 2025, Tejralová received a five-minute major penalty and game misconduct for checking Sarah Fillier to the head at 11:25 of the first period in a 4–3 loss to the New York Sirens in Dallas as part of the PWHL Takeover Tour. Seattle's penalty kill successfully killed off the entire five-minute major, with New York recording seven shots during the extended power play. Fillier went to the locker room but returned several minutes later and finished the game.

Tejralová scored her first goal for the Torrent in the PWHL on 27 February 2026, in a 5–2 loss against the Toronto Sceptres which broke the women's hockey arena attendance record in the US with an attendance of 17,335.

== International play ==
Tejralová joined the Czech Republic women's national team at age 15 in 2012. As a junior player, she participated in four IIHF World U18 Championships and was selected as a Top 3 Player for the Czech national team at the 2013 tournament. At the senior level, Tejralová competed in three IIHF Women's World Championship Division I A tournaments (2012, 2014, and 2015).

For the 2015 tournament, she was named Best Defenseman as she helped Czechia win gold and earn promotion to the Top Division. Tejralová competed in five Top Division World Championships (2013, 2016, 2017, 2019, and 2021) and was selected as a Top 3 Player on the Czech national team at the 2017 IIHF Women's World Championship.

At the 2022 IIHF Women's World Championship, Czechia won the bronze medal, the country's first ever medal at the Top Division level. The team won bronze again at the 2023 IIHF Women's World Championship, earning back-to-back bronze medals. Tejralová represented Czechia at the 2022 Winter Olympics in Beijing, scoring 1 goal in five games. She was named captain of the Czech national team prior to the 2023 World Championship, succeeding long-time captain Alena Mills who retired from international play.

Tejralova was named team captain for Czechia at the 2026 Winter Olympics.

== Career statistics ==
			Regular season					Playoffs
Season	Team	League	GP	G	A	Pts	PIM	GP	G	A	Pts	PIM
2011–12	HC Slavia Praha	Czech Women's Extraliga	21	10	23	33	22	2	0	0	0	4
2012–13	HC Slavia Praha	Czech Women's Extraliga	16	2	14	16	10	4	2	2	4	12
2015–16	Dynamo St. Petersburg	ZhHL	24	6	17	23	14	—	—	—	—	—
2016–17	Dynamo St. Petersburg	ZhHL	36	3	18	21	70	—	—	—	—	—
2017–18	Dynamo St. Petersburg	ZhHL	24	5	12	17	20	2	0	1	1	0
2018–19	Dynamo St. Petersburg	ZhHL	36	15	16	31	32	5	0	0	0	4
2019–20	Dynamo St. Petersburg	ZhHL	22	5	11	16	4	—	—	—	—	—
2020–21	SKIF Nizhny Novgorod	ZhHL	28	1	17	18	8	3	1	0	1	0
2021–22	SKIF Nizhny Novgorod	ZhHL	36	10	36	46	16	7	0	9	9	6
2022–23	Boston Pride	PHF	24	2	7	9	10	2	0	0	0	0
2023–24	Modo Hockey	SDHL	13	1	7	8	2	—	—	—	—	—
2023–24	PWHL Ottawa	PWHL	23	2	6	8	8	—	—	—	—	—
2024–25	Ottawa Charge	PWHL	30	1	9	10	18	8	1	1	2	0
2025–26	Seattle Torrent	PWHL	23	2	6	8	25	—	—	—	—	—
PHF totals			24	2	7	9	10	2	0	0	0	0
SDHL totals			13	1	7	8	2	—	—	—	—	—
PWHL totals			76	5	21	26	51	8	1	1	2	0
