= 2024–25 PWHL season =

2nd season of the PWHL

- League: Professional Women's Hockey League
- Sport: Ice hockey
- Duration: November 30, 2024 – May 3, 2025
- Games: 30 per team
- Teams: 6
- TV partner(s): CBC/Radio-Canada, TSN/RDS, Prime Video, NESN, FDSN North, MSG

2024 Draft
- Top draft pick: Sarah Fillier
- Picked by: New York Sirens

Regular season
- Season champions: Montreal Victoire
- Season MVP: Marie-Philip Poulin (Montreal Victoire)
- Top scorer: Hilary Knight (Boston Fleet) & Sarah Fillier (New York Sirens) (29)

Playoffs
- Playoffs MVP: Gwyneth Philips (Charge)

Walter Cup
- Champions: Minnesota Frost
- Runners-up: Ottawa Charge

PWHL seasons
- ← 2024 2025–26 →

The 2024–25 PWHL season was the second season of operation of the Professional Women's Hockey League. All six teams received new names and logos: Boston Fleet, Minnesota Frost, Montreal Victoire, New York Sirens, Ottawa Charge, and Toronto Sceptres. The regular season began on November 30, 2024. The playoffs began on May 7, 2025 and ended on May 26, with the Minnesota Frost winning their second consecutive Walter Cup after defeating the Ottawa Charge in four games for the title.

== League business ==
The 2024 PWHL Draft was held on June 10 in Saint Paul, Minnesota.

On September 9, 2024, the PWHL revealed new names and logos for all six teams: Boston Fleet, Minnesota Frost, Montreal Victoire, New York Sirens, Ottawa Charge, and Toronto Sceptres.

=== Front office changes ===
Front office changes
Off–season
Team	Previous general manager	New general manager	Notes
Minnesota Frost	Natalie Darwitz	Ken Klee*; Melissa Caruso	On June 7, 2024, one week after winning the league's inaugural championship and with only days before the draft, it was reported the general manager Natalie Darwitz would not return as general manager for the 2024–25 season. Darwitz was instead offered alternative options within the league. Head coach Ken Klee served as acting general manager at the 2024 PWHL Draft with support from assistant coach Mira Jalosuo and team captain Kendall Coyne Schofield. Caruso, most recently vice president of hockey operations and governance of the American Hockey League, was named general manager on September 3, 2024.

(*) Indicates interim

=== Coaching changes ===
Coaching changes
Off–season
Team	Previous coach	New coach	Notes
New York Sirens	Howie Draper	Greg Fargo	On May 11, 2024, one week after their final game of the season, last-place New York announced that coach Howie Draper would not return as coach for the 2024–25 season. He would remain with the team as a special advisor to the scouting department, while also returning to his previous job as head coach of the Alberta Pandas. Greg Fargo, most recently the head coach of the Colgate Raiders, was named as his replacement on June 7, 2024.

=== Arena changes ===
- The Montreal Victoire played the majority of their home games at Place Bell. Montreal played four games at Place Bell in the previous season, while Verdun Auditorium hosted the majority of their games; Verdun continued to serve as the team's training facility.
- The New York Sirens played home games at Prudential Center in Newark, New Jersey, outside of their home state. The team previously played at Total Mortgage Arena in Bridgeport, Connecticut.
- The Toronto Sceptres played home games at Coca-Cola Coliseum. Toronto previously played their playoff home games at Coca-Cola Coliseum, while their regular season was primarily hosted at Mattamy Athletic Centre.

== Preseason ==
=== Preseason schedule ===
The PWHL preseason schedule was announced on October 1, 2024. Preseason was held in two camps in Toronto and Montreal, began on November 19, and concluded on November 22. Each camp hosted three teams. The Montreal camp was held at Verdun Auditorium and featured the Montreal Victoire, Boston Fleet, and Ottawa Charge. Meanwhile, the Toronto camp was held at the Ford Performance Centre and showcased the Toronto Sceptres, Minnesota Frost, and New York Sirens.

All times in Eastern Time.

Game log
Pre-season camp

Date	Time	Visitor	Score	Home	OT	Notes	Box score/recap
November 20	14:00	Montreal	1–3	Boston		@ Verdun Auditorium	
November 20	14:15	Toronto	1–3	Minnesota		@ Ford Performance Centre	
November 21	14:00	Boston	1–6	Ottawa		@ Verdun Auditorium	
November 21	14:30	Minnesota	4–3	New York	OT	@ Ford Performance Centre	
November 22	14:00	Ottawa	3–6	Montreal		@ Verdun Auditorium	
November 22	14:30	New York	5–2	Toronto		@ Ford Performance Centre	

== Regular season ==
=== Standings ===
Pos	Team	Pld	W	OTW	OTL	L	GF	GA	GD	Pts	Qualification
1	Montreal Victoire (Y)	30	12	7	3	8	77	67	+10	53	Playoffs
2	Toronto Sceptres (X)	30	12	3	6	9	73	73	0	48	Playoffs
3	Ottawa Charge (X)	30	12	2	4	12	71	80	−9	44 (Note: Regulation wins: Ottawa 12, Minnesota 10, Boston 9)	Playoffs
4	Minnesota Frost (X)	30	10	5	4	11	85	76	+9	44	Playoffs
5	Boston Fleet (E)	30	9	6	5	10	75	76	−1	44	
6	New York Sirens (E)	30	8	4	5	13	71	80	−9	37	

Updated to match(es) played on May 3, 2025. Source: PWHL
(E) Eliminated; (X) Clinched playoff berth; (Y) Clinched first place

=== Schedule ===
The regular season schedule was announced on October 15, 2024. The season began on November 30, 2024, and ended on May 3, 2025, with each team playing 30 games; six games against every opponent. The season also featured nine neutral site games across North America, called the PWHL Takeover Tour.

All times in Eastern Time.

Game log
November

Date	Time	Visitor	Score	Home	OT	Notes	Box score/recap
November 30	2:00	Boston	1–3	Toronto			
November 30	5:00	Ottawa	3–4	Montreal	SO		

December

Date	Time	Visitor	Score	Home	OT	Notes	Box score/recap
December 1	6:00	New York	4–3	Minnesota	OT		
December 3	7:00	Toronto	2–3	Ottawa			
December 4	7:00	Minnesota	2–1	Boston			
December 4	7:00	New York	4–1	Montreal			
December 6	7:00	Montreal	2–1	Ottawa		@ Canadian Tire Centre	
December 7	2:00	Minnesota	6–3	Toronto			
December 8	4:00	New York	2–4	Boston			
December 17	7:00	Ottawa	2–3	Boston			
December 18	7:00	Toronto	2–4	New York			
December 19	8:00	Ottawa	2–5	Minnesota			
December 21	2:00	Montreal	4–3	Toronto	OT		
December 22	12:00	Minnesota	4–3	New York	SO		
December 27	7:00	Boston	2–4	Toronto			
December 28	2:00	Montreal	3–2	Minnesota			
December 29	1:00	Ottawa	3–1	New York			
December 30	7:00	Boston	1–3	Montreal			
December 31	7:00	Ottawa	2–1	Toronto			

January

Date	Time	Visitor	Score	Home	OT	Notes	Box score/recap
January 2	7:30	Boston	3–4	Minnesota	OT		
January 4	2:00	New York	5–0	Minnesota		Corinne Schroeder recorded shutout (1)	
January 5	4:00	Montreal	2–3	Boston	SO	@ Climate Pledge Arena, Seattle	
January 7	7:00	Ottawa	3–2	New York			
January 8	10:00	Montreal	4–2	Toronto		@ Rogers Arena, Vancouver	
January 8	7:30	Boston	1–2	Minnesota	OT		
January 11	2:00	Boston	2–1	Ottawa	OT		
January 12	12:00	Toronto	0–1	New York	OT	Corinne Schroeder recorded shutout (2)	
January 12	3:00	Montreal	2–4	Minnesota		@ Ball Arena, Denver; New US attendance record: 14,018	
January 14	7:00	Toronto	4–2	Ottawa			
January 15	7:00	Minnesota	2–3	New York	SO		
January 17	7:00	Minnesota	2–4	Montreal			
January 19	1:00	Ottawa	1–2	Montreal		@ Videotron Centre, Quebec City	
January 21	7:00	Ottawa	1–0	Minnesota		Gwyneth Philips recorded shutout (1)	
January 22	7:00	Toronto	1–4	Boston			
January 25	2:00	New York	2–4	Toronto		@ Scotiabank Arena	
January 26	3:00	Boston	2–5	Minnesota			
January 27	7:00	New York	3–0	Ottawa		Kayle Osborne recorded shutout (1)	
January 28	7:00	Toronto	3–4	Minnesota	SO		
January 29	7:00	Ottawa	1–4	Montreal		Marie-Philip Poulin recorded hat-trick (1)	
January 30	7:00	Toronto	3–4	Montreal	SO		
January 31	7:00	New York	2–3	Boston	SO		

February

Date	Time	Visitor	Score	Home	OT	Notes	Box score/recap
February 1	2:00	Ottawa	2–4	Toronto			
February 2	1:00	Montreal	2–1	New York			
February 11	7:00	Minnesota	2–3	Toronto	OT		
February 12	7:00	Boston	4–0	New York		Aerin Frankel recorded shutout (1)	
February 13	7:00	Minnesota	3–8	Ottawa		Tereza Vanišová recorded hat-trick (1)	
February 14	7:00	Boston	1–3	Toronto			
February 15	2:00	New York	2–6	Montreal			
February 16	1:00	Minnesota	2–4	Boston			
February 16	4:00	Toronto	3–2	Ottawa	OT	@ Rogers Place, Edmonton	
February 17	4:00	Boston	4–1	New York			
February 18	7:00	Minnesota	4–0	Montreal		Maddie Rooney recorded shutout (1)	
February 19	7:00	Toronto	4–1	New York			
February 20	7:00	Boston	3–2	Ottawa	OT		
February 22	2:00	Montreal	1–3	Ottawa			
February 23	4:00	Boston	3–2	New York	SO	@ KeyBank Center, Buffalo	
February 23	1:30	Toronto	2–1	Minnesota			
February 25	7:00	Toronto	1–3	Montreal			
February 26	7:00	New York	4–5	Ottawa	OT		

March

Date	Time	Visitor	Score	Home	OT	Notes	Box score/recap
March 1	2:00	Boston	2–3	Montreal	OT	@ Bell Centre	
March 4	7:00	Minnesota	1–2	Montreal	SO		
March 5	7:00	New York	2–5	Boston		Hilary Knight recorded hat-trick (1)	
March 6	7:00	Montreal	1–4	Toronto			
March 7	7:00	Ottawa	0–5	Minnesota		@ Lenovo Center, Raleigh; Maddie Rooney recorded shutout (2)	
March 8	2:00	Montreal	3–2	Boston	OT	@ Agganis Arena, Boston	
March 9	1:00	Minnesota	2–1	Toronto	OT		
March 11	7:00	Minnesota	2–3	Ottawa			
March 12	7:00	Montreal	2–3	New York	OT		
March 15	2:00	Boston	5–2	Ottawa			
March 16	7:30	Minnesota	1–4	New York		@ Little Caesars Arena, Detroit; New US attendance record: 14,288	
March 18	7:00	Montreal	2–3	Boston	SO		
March 19	7:00	New York	1–2	Toronto			
March 22	12:00	Ottawa	5–2	New York		Tereza Vanišová recorded hat-trick (2), Abby Roque scored the first Michigan goal	
March 23	12:00	Toronto	2–1	Montreal			
March 25	7:00	New York	6–3	Ottawa			
March 26	7:00	Toronto	4–2	Boston		@ Agganis Arena, Boston	
March 26	8:00	Montreal	4–1	Minnesota			
March 29	2:00	Ottawa	2–1	Boston		@ Enterprise Center, St. Louis	
March 30	1:00	Toronto	2–5	Minnesota			

April

Date	Time	Visitor	Score	Home	OT	Notes	Box score/recap
April 1	7:00	New York	1–0	Montreal		Corinne Schroeder recorded shutout (3)	
April 2	7:00	Ottawa	4–0	Boston		Gwyneth Philips recorded shutout (2); Shiann Darkangelo recorded hat-trick (1)	
April 26	12:00	Montreal	2–3	Ottawa			
April 26	2:00	Toronto	0–3	Boston		Klára Peslarová recorded shutout (1)	
April 27	2:00	New York	2–0	Minnesota		Corinne Schroeder recorded shutout (4)	
April 28	7:00	Boston	2–3	Montreal	OT		
April 29	7:00	New York	1–2	Toronto	SO		
April 30	7:00	Minnesota	3–0	Ottawa		Nicole Hensley recorded shutout (1)	

May

Date	Time	Visitor	Score	Home	OT	Notes	Box score/recap
May 3	12:00	Ottawa	2–1	Toronto	OT		
May 3	1:00	Minnesota	8–1	Boston			
May 3	2:00	Montreal	3–2	New York			

=== Statistics ===
==== Scoring leaders ====
The following players led the league in regular season points at the conclusion of the season.

Player	Team	GP	G	A	Pts	+/–	PIM
Hilary Knight	Boston	30	15	14	29	0	12
Sarah Fillier	New York	30	13	16	29	+10	35
Daryl Watts	Toronto	30	12	15	27	−2	12
Marie-Philip Poulin	Montreal	30	19	7	26	+17	21
Kendall Coyne Schofield	Minnesota	30	12	12	24	+12	4
Hannah Miller	Toronto	29	10	14	24	+14	8
Jessie Eldridge	New York	30	9	15	24	0	18
Tereza Vanišová	Ottawa	30	15	7	22	−2	38
Laura Stacey	Montreal	27	11	11	22	+12	6
Taylor Heise	Minnesota	29	8	14	22	+1	6
Sophie Jaques	Minnesota	25	7	15	22	+12	10
Renata Fast	Toronto	30	6	16	22	0	36

==== Leading goaltenders ====
The following goaltenders led the league in regular season goals against average at the conclusion of the season.

Minimum 600 minutes played

Player	Team	GP	TOI	W	L	OTL	GA	SO	SV%	GAA
Ann-Renée Desbiens	Montreal	21	1228:17	15	2	2	38	0	.932	1.86
Maddie Rooney	Minnesota	19	1129:12	8	7	3	39	2	.907	2.07
Gwyneth Philips	Ottawa	15	794:31	8	5	1	28	2	.919	2.11
Kristen Campbell	Toronto	21	1227:46	9	8	4	46	0	.910	2.25
Aerin Frankel	Boston	23	1342:18	12	8	3	51	1	.921	2.28

=== Attendance ===
Home team	Home games	Average attendance	Total attendance
Toronto	14	9,059	126,830
Montreal	14	9,013	126,182
Ottawa	14	6,888	96,431
Minnesota	13	6,524	84,813
Boston	13	4,587	59,625
New York	13	2,764	35,933
Neutral sites	9	13,733	123,601
League	90	7,245	644,839

=== Supplemental discipline ===
==== Suspensions ====
Date of incident	Offender	Team	Offense	Length
December 4, 2024	Maggie Flaherty	Minnesota Frost	Illegal check to the head of Alina Müller.	2 games
December 21, 2024	Rylind MacKinnon	Toronto Sceptres	Illegal check to the head of Amanda Boulier.	1 game
January 3, 2025	Catherine Dubois	Montreal Victoire	Illegal check to the head of Megan Keller.	1 game
January 4, 2025	Britta Curl-Salemme	Minnesota Frost	Roughing against Theresa Schafzahl.	1 game
January 4, 2025	Kelly Babstock	Boston Fleet	Cross-checking against Britta Curl-Salemme.	1 game
March 11, 2025	Britta Curl-Salemme	Minnesota Frost	Elbowing to the head of Megan Carter.	1 game
March 29, 2025	Kelly Babstock	Boston Fleet	Slew footing against Jesse Compher	2 games
April 7, 2025	Kati Tabin	Montreal Victoire	Illegal check to the head of Jessie Eldridge	2 games
April 7, 2025	Zoe Boyd	Ottawa Charge	Illegal check to the head of Alina Müller	1 game
May 9, 2025	Britta Curl-Salemme	Minnesota Frost	Illegal check to the head against Renata Fast.	1 game
Total:				13 games

==== Fines ====
Date of incident	Offender	Team	Offense	Amount
January 29, 2025	Tereza Vanišová	Ottawa Charge	Boarding against Taylor Girard.	$500.00
February 6, 2025	Marie-Philip Poulin	Montreal Victoire	Charging against Jade Downie-Landry.	$250.00
February 15, 2025	Marie-Philip Poulin	Montreal Victoire	Roughing against Emmy Fecteau.	$500.00
February 15, 2025	Dara Greig	Montreal Victoire	Boarding against Allyson Simpson.	$250.00
February 25, 2025	Hannah Brandt	Boston Fleet	Cross-check to the head against Brooke Hobson.	$250.00
March 4, 2025	Kristin O'Neill	Montreal Victoire	High-sticking against Emily Brown.	$250.00
March 11, 2025	Renata Fast	Toronto Sceptres	Cross-check to the head against Kendall Coyne Schofield.	$250.00
March 29, 2025	Erin Ambrose	Montreal Victoire	Cross-check to the shoulders and head against Denisa Křížová.	$250.00
Total:				$2,500.00

== Playoffs ==
=== Bracket ===
In each round, teams compete in a best-of-five series following a 2–2–1 format. The team with home ice advantage plays at home for games one and two (and game five, if necessary), and the other team is at home for games three and four. The top four teams make the playoffs.

In the first round, by virtue of finishing first in the regular season standings, the Montreal Victoire chose to play the Ottawa Charge, the third-place team. This selection meant that the second-place Toronto Sceptres would be the home team against the fourth-place Minnesota Frost.

Semi-finals
May 7–14, Coca-Cola Coliseum and Xcel Energy Center
Toronto Sceptres	3	3	5	3*
Minnesota Frost	2	5	7	4*
May 8–16, Place Bell and TD Place Arena
Montreal Victoire	2	3****	0	1
Ottawa Charge	3	2****	1	2

PWHL Finals
May 20–26 TD Place Arena and Xcel Energy Center
Minnesota Frost	1*	2*	2***	2*
Ottawa Charge	2*	1*	1***	1*

* - Denotes overtime period(s)

== PWHL awards ==
On June 25, 2025, the PWHL announced the 2025 award winners.

Award	Recipient(s)	Runner(s)-up/finalists	Ref
Walter Cup	Minnesota Frost	Ottawa Charge	
Billie Jean King MVP Award Most valuable player, regular season	Marie-Philip Poulin (Montreal Victoire)	Renata Fast (Toronto Sceptres); Hilary Knight (Boston Fleet)	
Ilana Kloss Playoff MVP Award Most valuable player, playoffs	Gwyneth Philips (Ottawa Charge)	—N/a	
Forward of the Year	Marie-Philip Poulin (Montreal Victoire)	Sarah Fillier (New York Sirens); Hilary Knight (Boston Fleet)	
Defender of the Year	Renata Fast (Toronto Sceptres)	Sophie Jaques (Minnesota Frost); Claire Thompson (Minnesota Frost)	
Goaltender of the Year	Ann-Renée Desbiens (Montreal Victoire)	Aerin Frankel (Boston Fleet); Gwyneth Philips (Ottawa Charge)	
Rookie of the Year	Sarah Fillier (New York Sirens)	Jennifer Gardiner (Montreal Victoire); Gwyneth Philips (Ottawa Charge)	
Coach of the Year	Kori Cheverie (Montreal Victoire)	Carla MacLeod (Ottawa Charge); Troy Ryan (Toronto Sceptres)	
Points Leader Regular season	Hilary Knight (Boston Fleet) – 29; Sarah Fillier (New York Sirens)	Daryl Watts (Toronto Sceptres) – 27	
Top Goal Scorer Regular season	Marie-Philip Poulin (Montreal Victoire) – 19	Hilary Knight (Boston Fleet) – 15; Tereza Vanišová (Ottawa Charge)	

=== All-Star teams ===
Position	First Team	Second Team	All-Rookie
F	Sarah Fillier (New York)	Kendall Coyne Schofield (Minnesota)	Britta Curl-Salemme (Minnesota)
F	Hilary Knight (Boston)	Tereza Vanisova (Ottawa)	Sarah Fillier (New York)
F	Marie-Philip Poulin (Montreal)	Daryl Watts (Toronto)	Jennifer Gardiner (Montreal)
D	Renata Fast (Toronto)	Ella Shelton (Toronto)	Cayla Barnes (Montreal)
D	Sophie Jacques (Minnesota)	Claire Thompson (Minnesota)	Anna Wilgren (Montreal)
G	Ann-Renee Desbiens (Montreal)	Aerin Frankel (Boston)	Gwyneth Philips (Ottawa)

== Transactions ==
=== Draft ===
The 2024 PWHL Draft was held on June 10, 2024.

=== Free agency ===
Free agents who switched teams
Date	Player	New team	Previous team
June 21, 2024	Daryl Watts	Toronto	Ottawa
June 21, 2024	Emma Woods	Toronto	New York
June 24, 2024	Rebecca Leslie	Ottawa	Toronto
June 25, 2024	Alexa Vasko	Ottawa	Toronto
July 9, 2024	Emma Greco	Boston	Minnesota

==== Imports ====
Date	Player	New team	Previous team	League
June 10, 2024	Lina Ljungblom	Montreal	MoDo Hockey	SDHL
June 25, 2024	Logan Angers	Ottawa	Quinnipiac Bobcats	ECAC
November 29, 2024	Klára Peslarová	Boston Fleet	Brynas IF	SDHL
November 29, 2024	Rylind MacKinnon	Toronto Sceptres	UBC Thunderbirds	CWUAA
December 22, 2024	Charlotte Akervik	Minnesota Frost	Minnesota State Mavericks	WCHA

=== Trades ===
June 10, 2024	To Boston 2nd-rd pick – 2024 PWHL Draft (# 7 – Daniela Pejšová); 7th-rd pick – 2024 PWHL Draft (# 37 – Ilona Markova)	To New York 2nd-rd pick – 2024 PWHL Draft (# 10 – Maja Nylén Persson); 3rd-rd pick – 2024 PWHL Draft (# 16 – Allyson Simpson); 5th-rd pick – 2024 PWHL Draft (# 28 – Kayle Osborne)
December 30, 2024	To Ottawa Charge Victoria Bach; Jocelyne Larocque	To Toronto Sceptres Hayley Scamurra; Savannah Harmon
January 21, 2025	To Boston Jill Saulnier	To New York Taylor Girard
March 13, 2025	To Montreal Victoire Kaitlin Willoughby	To Toronto Sceptres Anna Kjellbin

=== Retirement ===
Date	Player	Team
June 16, 2024	Becca Gilmore	Ottawa
June 17, 2024	Sophia Kunin	Minnesota
June 20, 2024	Erica Howe	Toronto
July 24, 2024	Brigitte Laganière	Montreal
July 25, 2024	Amanda Leveille	Minnesota
August 11, 2024	Taylor Wenczkowski	Boston
October 7, 2024	Gigi Marvin	Boston
October 8, 2024	Jess Jones	Toronto
October 9, 2024	Lauriane Rougeau	Toronto
October 11, 2024	Ann-Sophie Bettez	Montreal
October 11, 2024	Emma Buckles	Ottawa
October 11, 2024	Abby Cook	Boston
October 11, 2024	Sammy Davis	Ottawa
October 11, 2024	Rosalie Demers	Ottawa
October 11, 2024	Kaleigh Fratkin	Montreal
October 11, 2024	Fanni Garát-Gasparics	Ottawa
October 11, 2024	Victoria Howran	Ottawa
October 11, 2024	Emma Keenan	Toronto
October 11, 2024	Sarah Lefort	Montreal
October 11, 2024	Leah Lum	Montreal
October 11, 2024	Lauren MacInnis	Ottawa
October 11, 2024	Nikki Nightengale	Minnesota
October 11, 2024	Carley Olivier	New York
October 11, 2024	Lindsey Post	New York
October 11, 2024	Alex Poznikoff	Montreal
October 11, 2024	Brooke Stacey	Montreal
November 23, 2024	Madison Packer	New York

== Broadcast rights ==
=== Canada ===
==== English ====
Beginning with the 2024–25 season, 57 of the 90 games in the regular season, as well as one of the two semi-final series and the PWHL Finals, were broadcast in Canada by TSN. In addition, 17 Saturday afternoon games were broadcast by the CBC. All Tuesday night games were streamed on Prime Video, as well as one of the two semi-final series.

==== French ====
During the regular-season, only Montreal Victoire games were broadcast in French. TSN's sister network RDS broadcast 18 of the Victoire's 30 regular-season games, with most Saturday games broadcast on CBC's sister network Radio-Canada and Tuesday games on Prime Video. Playoff coverage matched that of English Canada, with one semi-final series broadcast on Prime Video and the other, as well as the final series, on RDS.

=== United States ===
==== National ====
All games were streamed on YouTube and the league's own website. For the playoffs, the PWHL reached agreements with FanDuel Sports Network, Gray Media, Scripps Sports and the Sinclair Broadcast Group to expand its distribution of games. (Note: Games specifically aired on FanDuel Sports Network SoCal, FanDuel Sports Network Southwest, Gulf Coast Sports & Entertainment Network, Peachtree Sports Network, Palmetto Sports & Entertainment Network, Rock Entertainment Sports Network, Tennessee Valley Sports & Entertainment Network, Matrix Midwest, The Wax, KCRG-DT2, WHDT, WFTX-DT3, KUPX-TV, KCDO-TV, KMCC, KIVI-DT2, KSAW-DT2, and KUNS-TV.)

==== Local ====
In New England, Boston Fleet games were broadcast on NESN. In the Minneapolis–Saint Paul area, Minnesota Frost games were broadcast on FanDuel Sports Network North. In the New York metropolitan area, New York Sirens games were broadcast on MSG Network.

=== International ===
Outside of Canada, all games were streamed on YouTube and the league's own website. Viewers in the Czech Republic and Slovakia could watch via Nova Sport.
