= Tory Mariano =

- Born: February 21, 2003 (age 23) West Seneca, New York, U.S.
- Height: 5 ft 8 in (173 cm)
- Position: Defense
- Shoots: Right
- PWHL team: Ottawa Charge
- Playing career: 2026–present

Victoria Mariano (born February 21, 2003) is an American professional ice hockey defender for the Ottawa Charge of the Professional Women's Hockey League (PWHL). She played college ice hockey at Northeastern.

== Early life ==
Mariano, the younger of two daughters of Joseph and Kimberly Mariano, grew up in West Seneca and attended Nichols School, where she played field hockey and lacrosse alongside ice hockey. She graduated in 2021. While in high school, Mariano also played for the Buffalo Bisons 19U AAA team and the Toronto Jr. Aeros.

Mariano graduated from Northeastern University in 2026 with a bachelor of science degree in biology.

== Playing career ==
Mariano made her debut for the Northeastern Huskies during the 2021–22 season, scoring two assists in 22 games. She posted six points in 38 games in 2022–23, six points in 34 games in 2023–24, and 16 points in 37 games in 2024–25. She also scored four points for Northeastern in the 2025 Women's Beanpot, including two assists in the team's 4–0 victory over Boston University in the final.

=== Professional ===
On June 17, 2026, Mariano was drafted in the fourth round, 47th overall, by the Ottawa Charge in the 2026 PWHL Draft.

== Awards and honors ==
- AHCA/Krampade All-America Scholar (2023–24, 2024–25)
- Hockey East All-Academic Team (2021–22, 2023–24, 2024–25)
- 2025 Beanpot Championship
