= Hayley Scamurra =

American ice hockey player (born 1994)

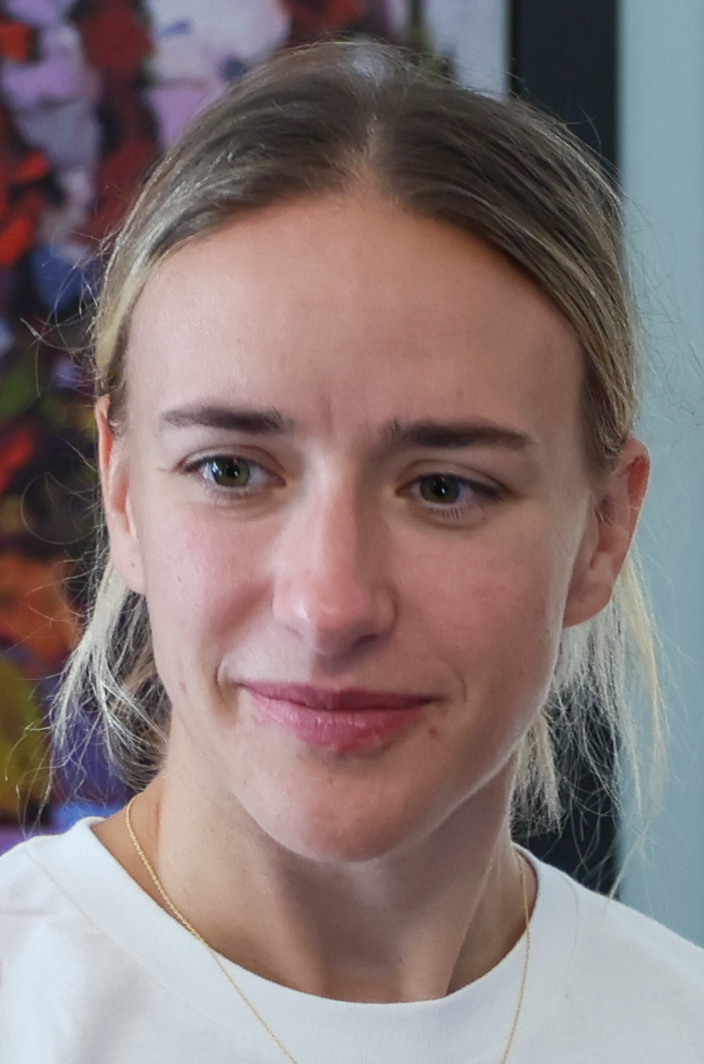
- Scamurra in Sept. 2024
- Born: December 14, 1994 (age 31) Williamsville, New York, U.S.
- Height: 5 ft 8 in (173 cm)
- Weight: 161 lb (73 kg; 11 st 7 lb)
- Position: Forward
- Shoots: Left
- PWHL team Former teams: Vegas Vanguards; Buffalo Beauts; Ottawa Charge; Toronto Sceptres; Montreal Victoire
- National team: United States
- Playing career: 2012–present
Medal record
Olympic Games
Gold medal – first place	2026 Milano Cortina	Team
Silver medal – second place	2022 Beijing	Team
World Championship
Gold medal – first place	2019 Finland
Gold medal – first place	2023 Canada
Gold medal – first place	2025 Czechia
Gold medal – first place	2026 Denmark
Silver medal – second place	2021 Canada
Silver medal – second place	2022 Denmark
Silver medal – second place	2024 United States

Hayley Scamurra (born December 14, 1994) is an American professional ice hockey player for the Vegas Vanguards in the Professional Women's Hockey League (PWHL), and a member of the United States women's national ice hockey team. She previously played for the Montreal Victoire, Ottawa Charge, and Toronto Sceptres of the PWHL.

Internationally, Scamurra has represented the United States at six IIHF Women's World Championships, winning three gold medals (2019, 2023, 2025) and three silver medals (2021, 2022, 2024). She also won a silver medal at the 2022 Winter Olympics in Beijing. In professional hockey, she won the Isobel Cup with the Buffalo Beauts in 2017. She led the National Women's Hockey League in scoring during the 2018–19 season and was named the league's Rookie of the Year in 2017–18.

She played college ice hockey at Northeastern from 2013 to 2017, recording 111 points in 123 games. She was named Hockey East Best Defensive Forward in her senior season and was a three-time Hockey East All-Academic Team selection. Before playing college hockey, she was one of the few American players to compete in the Ontario Junior women's league, playing for the Oakville Jr. Hornets and Burlington Jr. Barracudas. She is the daughter of former Washington Capitals player Peter Scamurra.

== Early life ==
Born in Buffalo, New York to Rebecca and Peter Scamurra, Hayley was raised in Getzville, a suburb of Buffalo, with her three older brothers who all played hockey. She began skating at age three on a backyard rink built by her father who was the first Buffalo-born player to play in the NHL. Her father bribed her with M&M's to skate with her brothers on the family's backyard rink.

At age seven, while playing for boys' team coached by her father, Scamurra listed her personal goal as becoming a U.S. Olympian. Her father kept the team card on the family's refrigerator as a reminder of her dream. Scamurra competed on boys' teams until age 12, playing for the Wheatfield Blades and Buffalo Bisons. She attended Nichols School in Buffalo.

During her teenage years, Scamurra played in the Provincial Women's Hockey League (PWHL) in Ontario, competing for the Oakville Hornets and Burlington Barracudas. She was not invited to USA Hockey development camps as a teenager or college student, making her path to the U.S. national team unconventional compared to players who had been embedded in the USA Hockey program from a young age.

== Playing career ==
=== College ===
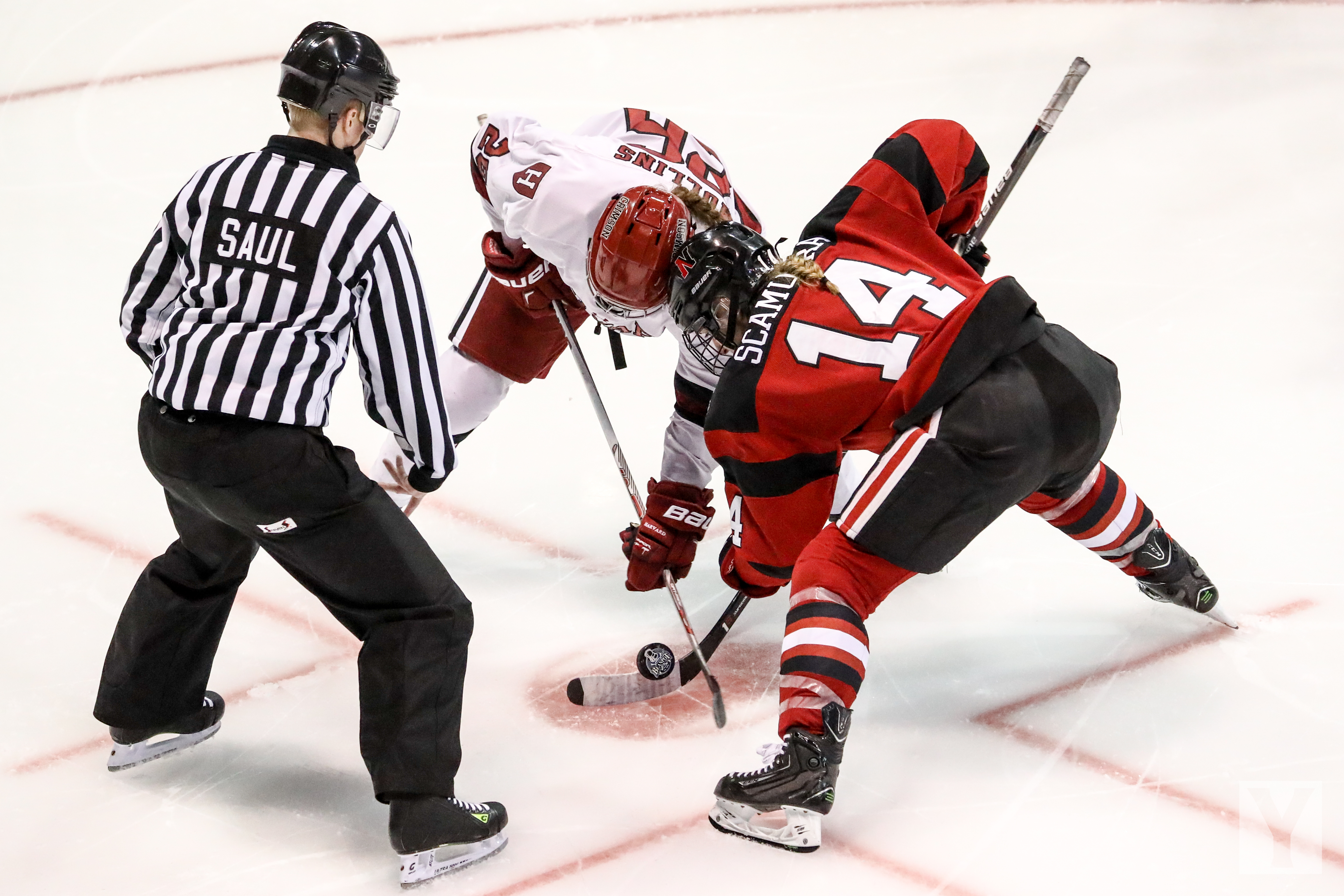
Scamurra with the Northeastern Huskies in 2017

Scamurra played four seasons as a forward for the Northeastern Huskies from 2013 to 2017, recording 111 points in 123 games, tied for 21st all-time in school history. She was often paired with Kendall Coyne Schofield as a linemate. In her freshman season (2013–14), Scamurra was named to the Hockey East All-Rookie Team and was chosen as a Hockey East Pro Ambitions All-Rookie Forward. She was also named Hockey East Rookie of the Month for February 2014 and earned a spot on the Hockey East All-Academic Team. In her sophomore season (2014–15), she was third on the team in goals with 10, despite playing in only 19 games. She was named to the Hockey East All-Academic Team for the second consecutive year.

Scamurra's junior season (2015–16) was her breakout year, as she amassed 43 points and had a plus/minus rating of +43. In the NCAA tournament, she assisted on Coyne's 50th goal of the season in a game against No. 1 Boston College on March 12, 2016.

In her final season (2016–17), Scamurra scored 8 goals and 23 assists despite losing Kendall Coyne as a linemate. She was named the Hockey East Best Defensive Forward.

=== Professional ===
==== Buffalo Beauts (2017–19) ====
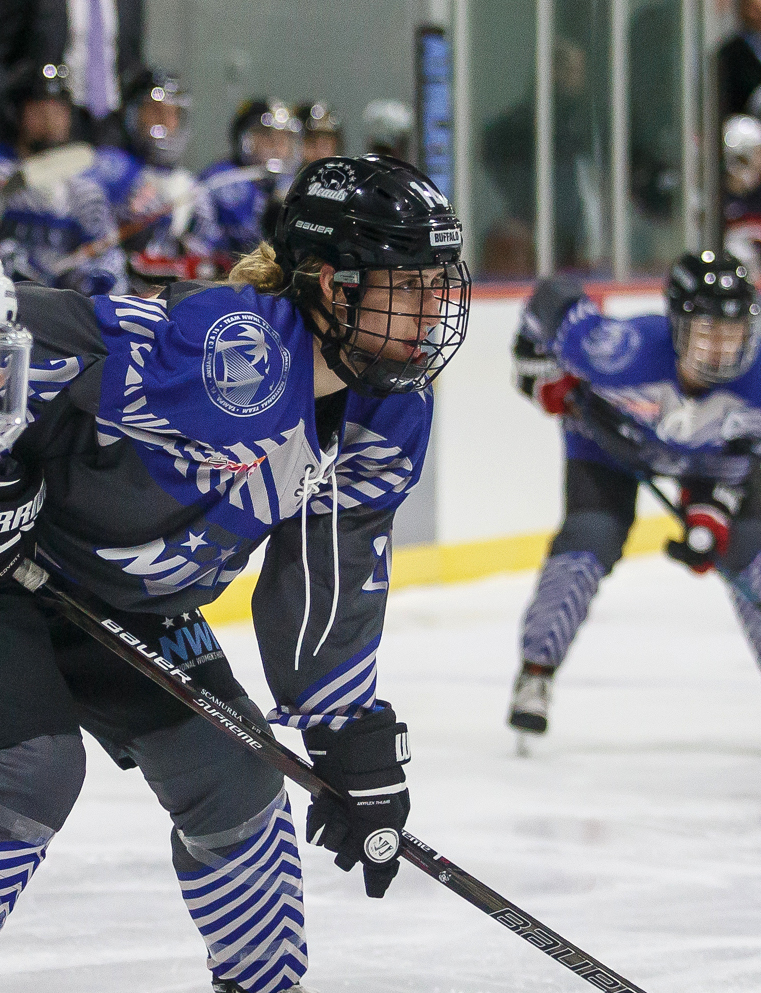
Hayley Scamurra with Team NWHL in 2018

In the 2016 NWHL Draft, Scamurra was chosen by the Buffalo Beauts as the 10th overall pick and the third chosen by Buffalo. She signed with the Beauts on March 10, 2017, to help with the end of season push for the Isobel Cup and was able to appear in the final regular season game, against the Connecticut Whale. She scored a goal in the first period of that game.

In her first appearance at the Isobel Cup playoffs, Scamurra scored 4 points (1 G, 3 A) in two games, including an assist in the championship game. The Buffalo Beauts defeated the Boston Pride and won the Isobel Cup as 2016-17 NWHL champions.

During the 2017–18 NWHL season, Scamurra led the Beauts in goals and tied for the team lead in points. She was named Rookie of the Year and was voted one of the three stars of the season by the fans. She was named to the all-star game, where she scored a hat-trick and was named co-MVP. The Beauts lost in the NWHL Championship to the Metropolitan Riveters.

In the 2018–19 NWHL season, Scamurra led the league in scoring with 20 points (10 G, 10 A). She was named to her second all-star game. The Beauts again reached the NWHL finals, achieving this feat for the third consecutive season, before ultimately losing in overtime to the Minnesota Whitecaps.

==== PWHPA (2019–23) ====
Following the dissolution of the Canadian Women's Hockey League (CWHL) on May 1, 2019, over 200 players from both the CWHL and National Women's Hockey League (NWHL) announced on May 2, 2019, their intent to boycott any North American professional league for the 2019–20 season, citing dissatisfaction with operations of both leagues in that neither provided health insurance or a livable salary. On May 20, 2019, the players formed the Professional Women's Hockey Players Association (PWHPA), a nonprofit organization dedicated to advocating for a unified, financially sustainable professional league.

External videos
- Making History at The Garden: PWHPA Dream Gap Tour, New York Rangers

Scamurra joined the PWHPA and competed in the Dream Gap Tour, a series of exhibition showcases across North America designed to generate support for establishing a new professional league. She was assigned to the New Hampshire regional training hub and competed for Team Women's Sports Foundation (Team WSF). On February 28, 2021, Scamurra made history playing in the first professional women's hockey game at Madison Square Garden, with Team WSF defeating Team Adidas 4-3. She opened the scoring in the second period off a feed from Gigi Marvin. The game was the first professional women's hockey game to be broadcast on national television, airing on the NHL Network and Sportsnet in Canada, and featured a pregame address by tennis legend Billie Jean King.

During the 2022–23 PWHPA season, Scamurra competed for Team Harvey's in the reorganized four-team format for the Dream Gap Tour. On November 5, 2022, in Truro, Nova Scotia, she scored the game-tying goal in the first period off a pass from Rosalie Demers in a 4-3 overtime victory over Team Adidas. She scored again against Team Adidas and Team Sonnet in Truro, helping Team Harvey's go undefeated for the weekend. On December 10, 2022, in Ottawa, she scored in a 3-1 victory over Team Scotiabank at the Canadian Tire Centre, with Jamie Lee Rattray assisting on the opening goal. On January 22, 2023, in Collingwood, Ontario, she scored Team Harvey's fourth goal in a 5-1 win over Team Adidas. Team Harvey's won the championship cup at the end of the 2022–23 PWHPA season.

In 2022, the PWHPA partnered with Mark Walter and Billie Jean King to form a players union and negotiate a collective bargaining agreement, leading to the formation of the Professional Women's Hockey League in 2023.

==== Ottawa Charge (2023–24) ====
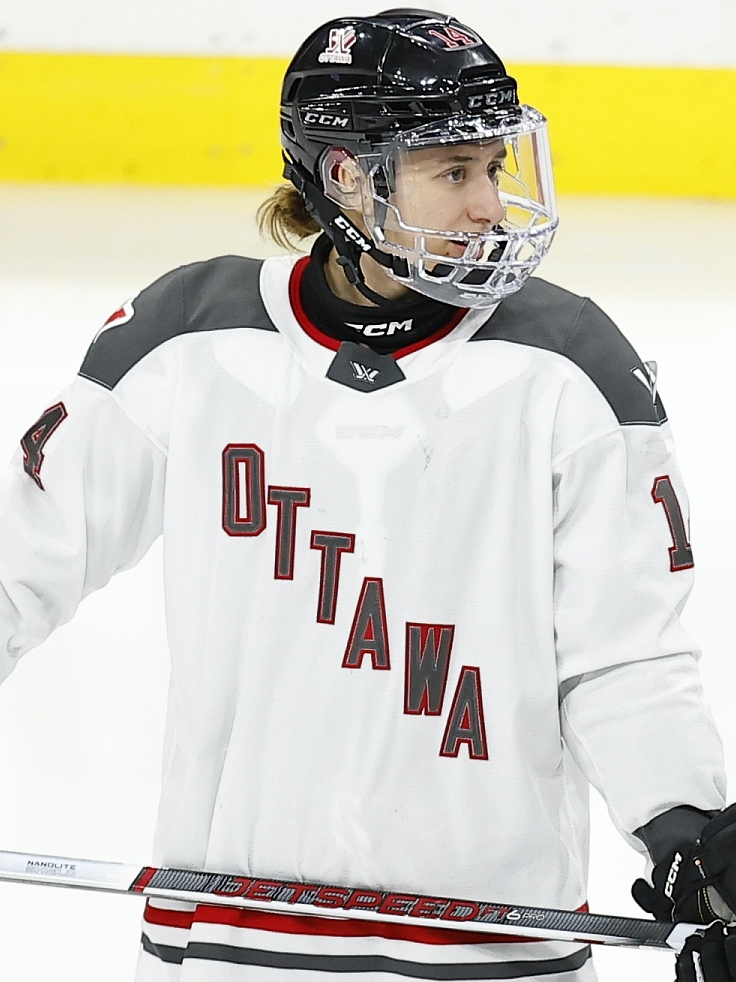
Scamurra with the Ottawa Charge in March 2024

Scamurra was drafted 29th overall in the 2023 PWHL Draft by Ottawa. She signed a two-year contract with the team on November 1, 2023. On January 2, 2024, in Ottawa's inaugural game, Scamurra scored the first goal in franchise history at 16:24 of the second period, firing a slap shot from the top of the circle on the power play that beat Ann-Renée Desbiens top corner. The game, played in front of 8,318 fans at TD Place Arena, set a new attendance record for a professional women's hockey game at the time. She scored again on January 28, 2024, in another record-setting game in front of 8,646 fans at TD Place Arena, which set a new Canadian attendance record for professional women's hockey.

In the inaugural PWHL season, Scamurra recorded 5 goals and 5 assists in 24 games with Ottawa. Despite leading the PWHL in attendance, Ottawa narrowly missed the playoffs, being eliminated from contention in a 5–2 loss to Toronto in the final game of the regular season.

==== Toronto Sceptres (2024–25) ====
On December 30, 2024, Scamurra was traded to the Toronto Sceptres, along with Savannah Harmon, in exchange for Jocelyne Larocque and Victoria Bach. Scamurra scored her first goal with Toronto on March 26, 2025, in a 4–2 victory over the Boston Fleet at Agganis Arena, deflecting a shot from Anna Kjellbin to give the Sceptres a 2–1 lead in the third period. She finished the 2024–25 season with one goal and two assists in 19 regular season games for the Sceptres. Toronto finished the regular season in second place and faced Minnesota in the semifinals, a rematch of the previous year's semifinal series. During the 2025 PWHL playoffs, Scamurra scored her first career playoff goal in Game 2 against Minnesota, opening the scoring in the first period of a 5–3 loss. She recorded one goal in four playoff games as Toronto lost the series 3–1 to the eventual Walter Cup champions.

==== Montreal Victoire (2025–2026) ====
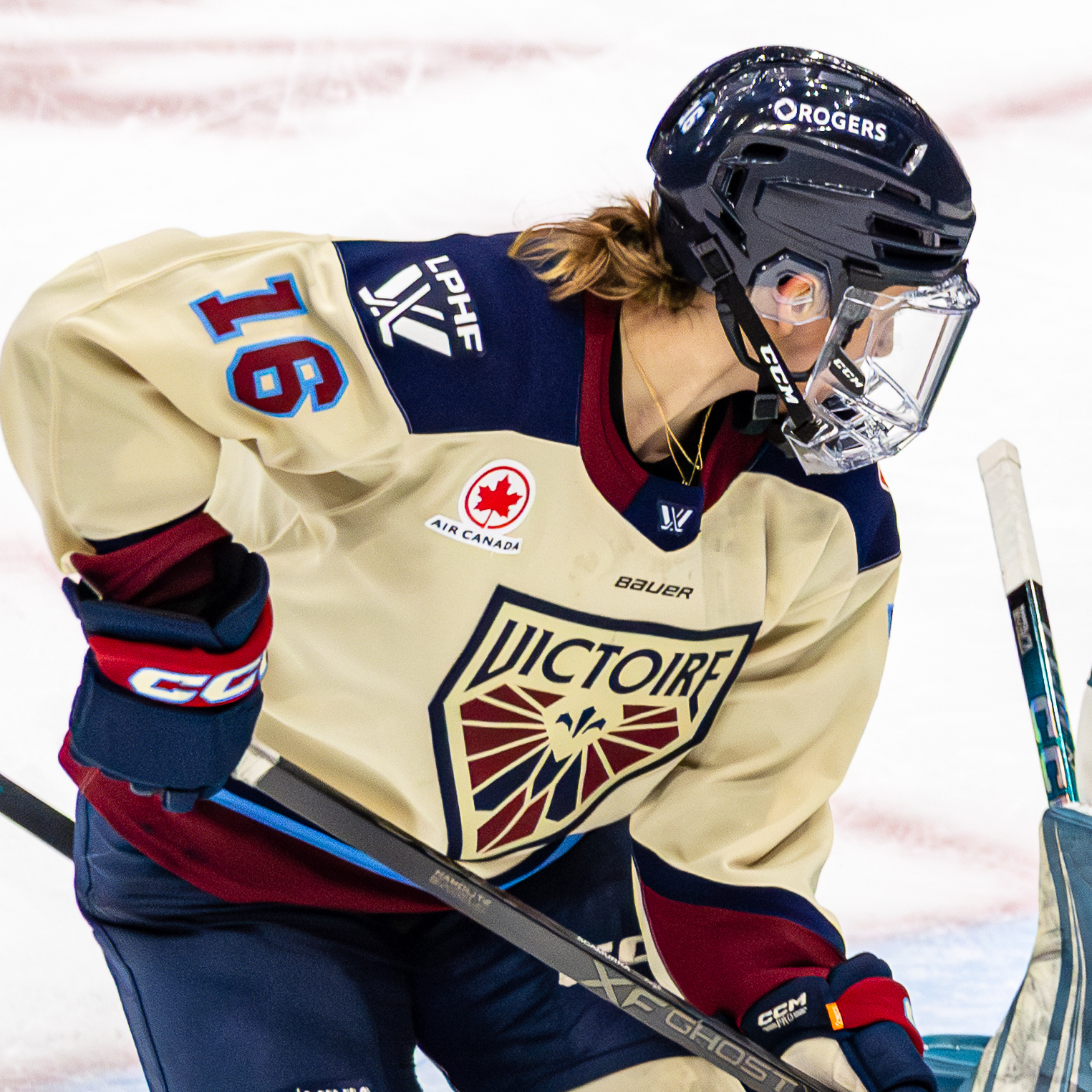
Scamurra with the Montreal Victoire in December 2025

On June 17, 2025, Scamurra signed a two-year contract with the Montreal Victoire. The signing reunited Scamurra with Victoire head coach Kori Cheverie, under whom she played during the PWHPA's 2022–23 season with Team Harvey's, winning the championship cup. With the signing, Scamurra became the first player to suit up for all three original Canadian PWHL teams (Ottawa, Toronto, and Montreal).

On December 7, 2025, in her first game back at Place Bell against her former team Toronto, Scamurra scored her first goal for the Victoire at 8:36 of the second period, which stood as the game-winning goal in a 3–1 victory. On December 20, 2025, she recorded her first assist of the season at Pacific Coliseum in Vancouver, the same venue where her father, Peter Scamurra, had tallied an assist for the Washington Capitals on December 9, 1978. She finished the 2025–26 season with eight goals and eight assists in 30 regular season games.

During the 2026 Walter Cup playoffs, Scamurra scored in game 3 of the semi-finals against the Minnesota Frost. On May 18, 2026, she scored a goal in game 3 of the finals against the Ottawa Charge. She finished the playoffs with two goals and two assists in nine games to help the Victoire win the Walter Cup.

==== Vegas Vanguards (2026–present) ====
During the league's expansion to 12 teams ahead of the 2026–27 season, she was left unprotected by the Victoire and signed a three-year contract with the Vegas Vanguards on June 8, 2026.

=== International ===
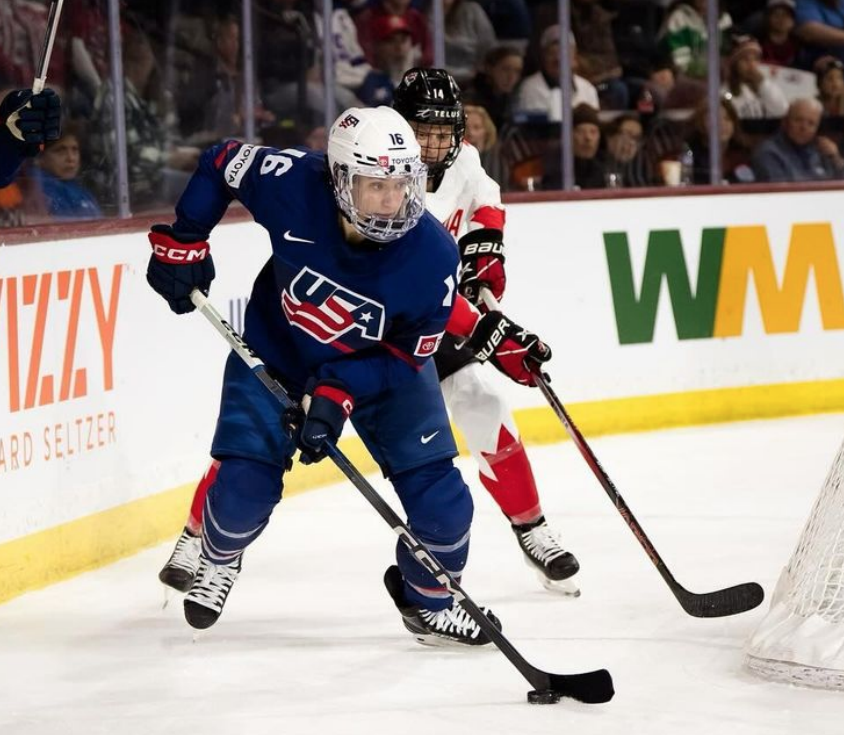
Scamurra with Team USA in November 2023

On January 25, 2019, Scamurra was named to the U.S. Women's National Team Roster for the 2019 Rivalry Series against Team Canada February 12–17, 2019 in London and Toronto, Ontario, and Detroit. She made her national team debut at the series after earning her spot through her NWHL performance.

==== World Championships ====
As of 2025, Scamurra has represented the United States at six World Championships, winning three gold medals (2019, 2023, 2025) and three silver medals (2021, 2022, 2024). She made her IIHF Women's World Championship debut at the 2019 tournament in Espoo, Finland, where she earned her first gold medal. She scored her first career World Championship goal in an 8–0 semifinal victory over Russia, finishing the tournament with two points and a +5 rating in seven games.

At the 2021 World Championship in Calgary, Scamurra earned a silver medal, scoring one goal in three games as the United States lost the gold medal game to Canada in overtime. She won gold at the 2023 World Championship in Brampton, Ontario, and silver at the 2024 tournament.

At the 2025 World Championship in České Budějovice, Czech Republic, Scamurra scored two goals in the tournament opener against Finland on April 9, 2025, helping the United States to a 7–1 victory. She scored at 2:44 and 5:39 of the first period, equaling her single-tournament goal high from 2022. The United States won the gold medal, defeating Canada 4–3 in overtime in the championship game.

==== Olympics ====
External videos
- Hayley Scamurra: 2022 Olympic Introduction, USA Hockey

On January 2, 2022, Scamurra was named to Team USA's roster for the 2022 Winter Olympics, where she won a silver medal with the team in Beijing, China. In the Olympics, Scamurra scored a pivotal goal to put Team USA up 3–0 in the semifinal game against Finland. She finished the tournament with one goal and two assists for three points in seven games.

On January 2, 2026, she was named to team USA's roster for the 2026 Winter Olympics. In the first game for the US at the 2026 Winter Olympics, Scamurra scored two goals in a 5-1 win over Czechia.

== Career statistics ==
=== Regular season and playoffs ===
			Regular season					Playoffs
Season	Team	League	GP	G	A	Pts	PIM	GP	G	A	Pts	PIM
2010–11	Burlington Jr. Barracudas	Prov. WHL	27	10	12	22	30	5	0	1	1	8
2011–12	Burlington Jr. Barracudas	Prov. WHL	30	12	18	30	38	6	1	1	2	10
2012–13	Oakville Jr. Hornets	Prov. WHL	28	13	12	25	30	—	—	—	—	—
2013–14	Northeastern Huskies	Hockey East	29	7	15	22	26	—	—	—	—	—
2014–15	Northeastern Huskies	Hockey East	19	10	5	15	12	—	—	—	—	—
2015–16	Northeastern Huskies	Hockey East	38	14	29	43	18	—	—	—	—	—
2016–17	Northeastern Huskies	Hockey East	37	8	23	31	40	—	—	—	—	—
2016–17	Buffalo Beauts	NWHL	1	1	0	1	0	2	1	3	4	0
2017–18	Buffalo Beauts	NWHL	14	7	7	14	16	2	0	1	1	2
2018–19	Buffalo Beauts	NWHL	16	10	10	20	12	2	0	2	2	0
2020–21	Team WSF	PWHPA	6	2	2	4	2	—	—	—	—	—
2022–23	Team Harvey's	PWHPA	18	6	6	12	10	—	—	—	—	—
2023–24	PWHL Ottawa	PWHL	24	5	5	10	2	—	—	—	—	—
2024–25	Ottawa Charge	PWHL	6	0	0	0	4	—	—	—	—	—
2024–25	Toronto Sceptres	PWHL	19	1	2	3	6	4	1	0	1	0
2025–26	Montreal Victoire	PWHL	30	8	8	16	20	9	2	2	4	0
PWHL totals			79	14	15	29	32	13	3	2	5	0

=== International ===
Year	Team	Event	Result	GP	G	A	Pts	PIM
2019	United States	WC	1st place, gold medalist(s)	7	1	1	2	4
2021	United States	WC	2nd place, silver medalist(s)	6	0	2	2	10
2022	United States	WC	2nd place, silver medalist(s)	7	2	1	3	4
2022	United States	OG	2nd place, silver medalist(s)	7	1	2	3	4
2023	United States	WC	1st place, gold medalist(s)	7	1	1	2	6
2024	United States	WC	2nd place, silver medalist(s)	7	0	3	3	4
2025	United States	WC	1st place, gold medalist(s)	7	2	1	3	2
2026	United States	OG	1st place, gold medalist(s)	7	3	0	3	2
Senior totals				55	10	11	21	34

== Awards and honors ==
International

- IIHF Women's World Championship gold medal (2019, 2023, 2025, 2026)
- IIHF Women's World Championship silver medal (2021, 2022, 2024)
- Olympic silver medal (2022)
- Olympic gold medal (2026)

PWHL

- First goal in PWHL Ottawa history (2024)
- Walter Cup champion (2026)

NWHL

- Isobel Cup champion (2017)
- NWHL Players' Association Top Player of the Year Award (2018–19)
- NWHL Leading Scorer Award (2018–19)
- NWHL Rookie of the Year (2017–18)
- NWHL All-Star (2018, 2019)
- Co-MVP, 3rd NWHL All-Star Game (2018)
- NWHL Co-Player of the Week (February 5, 2018)

Collegiate

- Hockey East Best Defensive Forward (2016–17)
- Hockey East All-Academic Team (2013–14, 2014–15, 2015–16)
- Hockey East All-Rookie Team (2013–14)
- Hockey East Rookie of the Month (February 2014)
