= Savannah Harmon =

American ice hockey player (born 1995)

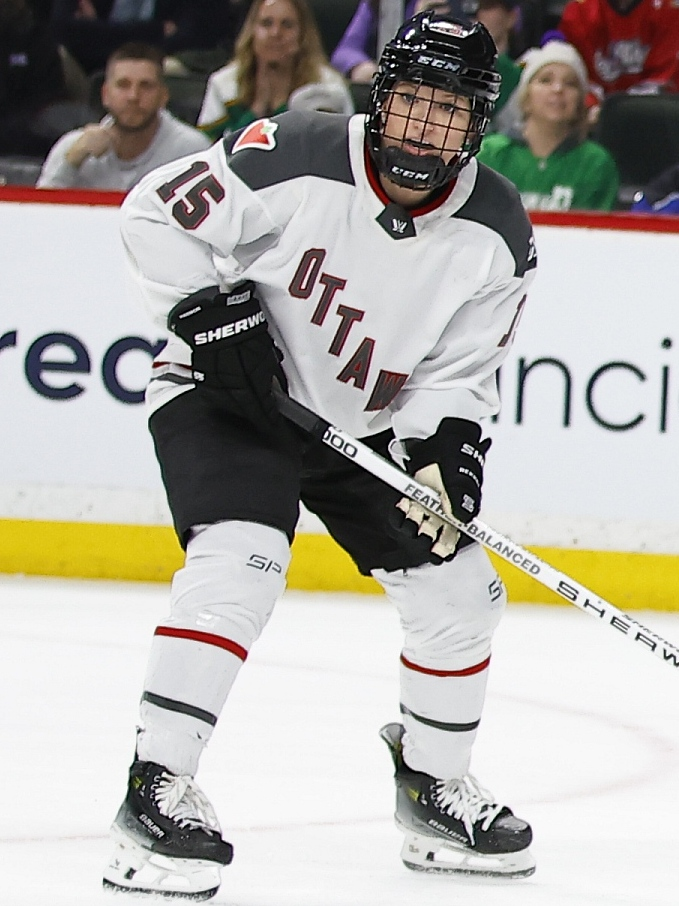
- Harmon with PWHL Ottawa in 2024
- Born: October 27, 1995 (age 30) Downers Grove, Illinois, US
- Height: 5 ft 3 in (160 cm)
- Weight: 148 lb (67 kg; 10 st 8 lb)
- Position: Defence
- Shot: Left
- Played for: Toronto Sceptres; Ottawa Charge; Buffalo Beauts
- National team: United States
- Playing career: 2014–2026
Medal record
Olympic Games
| Silver medal – second place | 2022 Beijing | Team |
World Championships
| Gold medal – first place | 2023 Canada |
| Gold medal – first place | 2025 Czechia |
| Silver medal – second place | 2021 Canada |
| Silver medal – second place | 2022 Denmark |
| Silver medal – second place | 2024 United States |

Savannah Ashley Harmon (born October 27, 1995) is a former American professional ice hockey defenceman who most recently played for the Toronto Sceptres of the Professional Women's Hockey League (PWHL) and was a member of the United States women's national ice hockey team. She previously played for the Minnesota chapter of the Professional Women's Hockey Players Association (PWHPA).

== Playing career ==
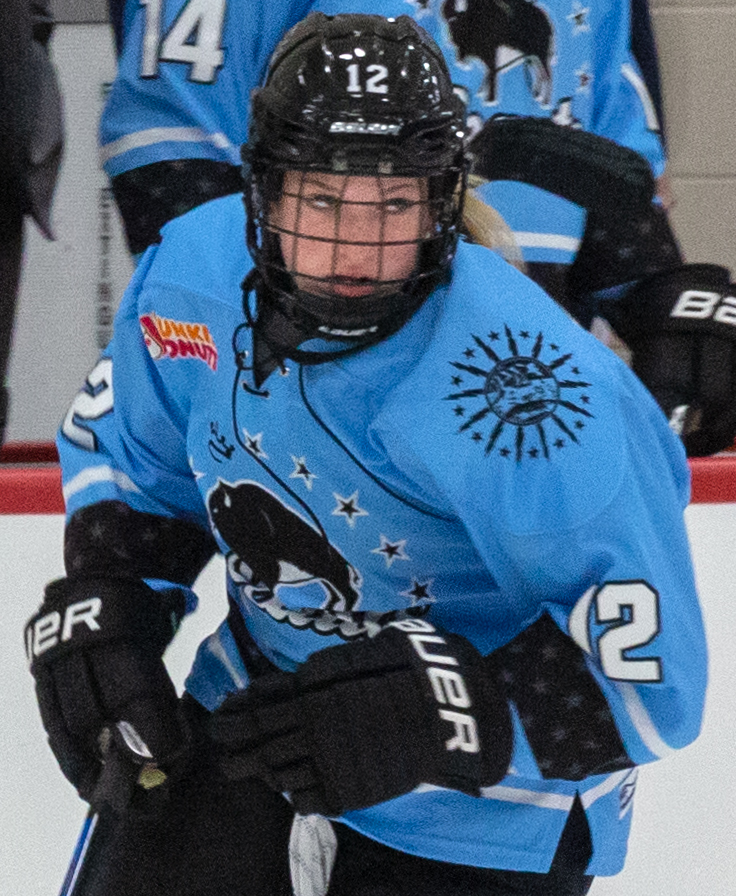
Harmon with the Buffalo Beauts in 2018

Harmon played her college ice hockey career with the Clarkson Golden Knights women's ice hockey program and captained Clarkson to consecutive NCAA Women's Ice Hockey Championship titles in 2017 and 2018. In 2018, she was a top-10 finalist for the Patty Kazmaier Award and was named an All-USCHO First Team All-Star.

In 2017, Harmon was drafted in the second round, 6th overall by the Buffalo Beauts. She played the 2018–19 NWHL season with the Beauts, before joining the Buffalo chapter of the PWHPA for the 2019–20 season. She relocated to Minnesota for the 2020–21 PWHPA season and participated in the organization’s Dream Gap Tour and other showcases.

Harmon was drafted in the first round, fifth overall by the PWHL Ottawa in the 2023 PWHL draft. On December 30, 2024, she, alongside Hayley Scamurra, was traded to the Toronto Sceptres in exchange for Jocelyne Larocque and Victoria Bach.

Harmon announced her retirement on May 28, 2026, at the age of 30.

== International play ==
Harmon made her debut with the United States women's national ice hockey team in the last three games of the 2019–20 Rivalry Series, a five-game series of international friendlies played between Team USA and the Canadian national team.

She was officially named to the US roster for the 2020 IIHF Women's World Championship before the tournament was canceled due to the COVID-19 pandemic. Undeterred, she re-earned a spot on the roster for the 2021 IIHF Women's World Championship.

On January 2, 2022, Harmon was named to Team USA's roster to represent the United States at the 2022 Winter Olympics.

== Personal life ==
Harmons models her play after Ryan Suter, her favorite type of music is country, and her favorite postgame meal is steak and mashed sweet potatoes. Harmon wants to become a lawyer once her hockey career ends.

== Career statistics ==
=== Regular season and playoffs ===
| | | | Regular season | | | | | Playoffs |
| Season | Team | League | GP | G | A | Pts | PIM | GP | G | A | Pts | PIM |
|---|---|---|---|---|---|---|---|---|---|---|---|---|
| 2012–13 | National Sports Academy | JWHL | 30 | 11 | 32 | 43 | 14 | — | — | — | — | — |
| 2013–14 | Boston Shamrocks | JWHL | 31 | 10 | 21 | 31 | 6 | — | — | — | — | — |
| 2014–15 | Clarkson University | ECAC | 28 | 7 | 14 | 21 | 10 | — | — | — | — | — |
| 2015–16 | Clarkson University | ECAC | 40 | 4 | 18 | 22 | 16 | — | — | — | — | — |
| 2016–17 | Clarkson University | ECAC | 41 | 11 | 25 | 36 | 8 | — | — | — | — | — |
| 2017–18 | Clarkson University | ECAC | 41 | 8 | 26 | 34 | 18 | — | — | — | — | — |
| 2018–19 | Buffalo Beauts | NWHL | 16 | 3 | 4 | 7 | 6 | 2 | 0 | 0 | 0 | 2 |
| 2019–20 | Buffalo | PWHPA | 6 | 1 | 5 | 6 | 4 | — | — | — | — | — |
| 2022–23 | Team Harvey's | PWHPA | 20 | 1 | 7 | 8 | 8 | — | — | — | — | — |
| 2023–24 | PWHL Ottawa | PWHL | 24 | 3 | 9 | 12 | 8 | — | — | — | — | — |
| 2024–25 | Ottawa Charge | PWHL | 6 | 0 | 0 | 0 | 0 | — | — | — | — | — |
| 2024–25 | Toronto Sceptres | PWHL | 24 | 0 | 6 | 6 | 2 | 4 | 1 | 2 | 2 | 0 |
| 2025–26 | Toronto Sceptres | PWHL | 30 | 2 | 4 | 6 | 6 | — | — | — | — | — |
| PWHL totals | | | 84 | 5 | 19 | 24 | 16 | 4 | 1 | 2 | 2 | 0 |

=== International ===
| Year | Team | Event | Result | GP | G | A | Pts | PIM |
|---|---|---|---|---|---|---|---|---|
| 2021 | United States | WC | 2nd place, silver medalist(s) | 6 | 0 | 1 | 1 | 2 |
| 2022 | United States | OG | 2nd place, silver medalist(s) | 7 | 2 | 5 | 7 | 0 |
| 2022 | United States | WC | 2nd place, silver medalist(s) | 7 | 1 | 5 | 6 | 2 |
| 2023 | United States | WC | 1st place, gold medalist(s) | 7 | 0 | 0 | 0 | 2 |
| 2024 | United States | WC | 2nd place, silver medalist(s) | 7 | 1 | 2 | 3 | 2 |
| 2025 | United States | WC | 1st place, gold medalist(s) | 6 | 0 | 2 | 2 | 0 |
| Senior totals | | | | 40 | 4 | 15 | 19 | 8 |
