= Ottawa Charge =

PWHL ice hockey team in Ottawa

Ottawa Charge Charge d'Ottawa (French)
- City: Ottawa, Ontario
- League: PWHL
- Conference: Eastern
- Founded: 2023
- Home arena: Canadian Tire Centre
- Colours: Red, gold, white, grey
- Owner: Mark Walter Group
- General manager: Michael Hirshfeld
- Head coach: Carla MacLeod
- Captain: Jocelyne Larocque
- Website: ottawa.thepwhl.com

Championships
- Regular season titles: 0
- Walter Cups: 0

Current uniform

The Ottawa Charge (French: Charge d'Ottawa) are a professional ice hockey team based in Ottawa, Ontario that competes in the Professional Women's Hockey League (PWHL). They are one of the league's six charter franchises. The Charge play home games at the Canadian Tire Centre in Ottawa.

== History ==
=== Founding and first season ===
On August 29, 2023, it was announced that one of the PWHL's first six franchises would be located in Ottawa. Michael Hirshfeld, former executive director of the National Hockey League Coaches' Association, was named the team's general manager, and TD Place Arena, its home venue. On September 15, Carla MacLeod, a former member of the Canadian national team and the head coach of the Czech women's national team, was named Ottawa's first head coach. Each PWHL team was permitted three signings during the free-agency period, ahead of the 2023 PWHL Draft. Ottawa signed Canadian national team players Emily Clark, Brianne Jenner, and Emerance Maschmeyer on September 5, 2023. Each signed a three-year deal lasting through to the 2025–26 season. Next, 15 players were selected in the league's September 18 draft, with Ottawa's first pick being American national team member Savannah Harmon. On October 17, it was announced that Haley Irwin and Cassea Schols would be assistant coaches and Pierre Groulx would be the goaltending coach.

The team colours and jerseys were officially revealed on November 14, 2023, as red, 'storm' grey, and white.

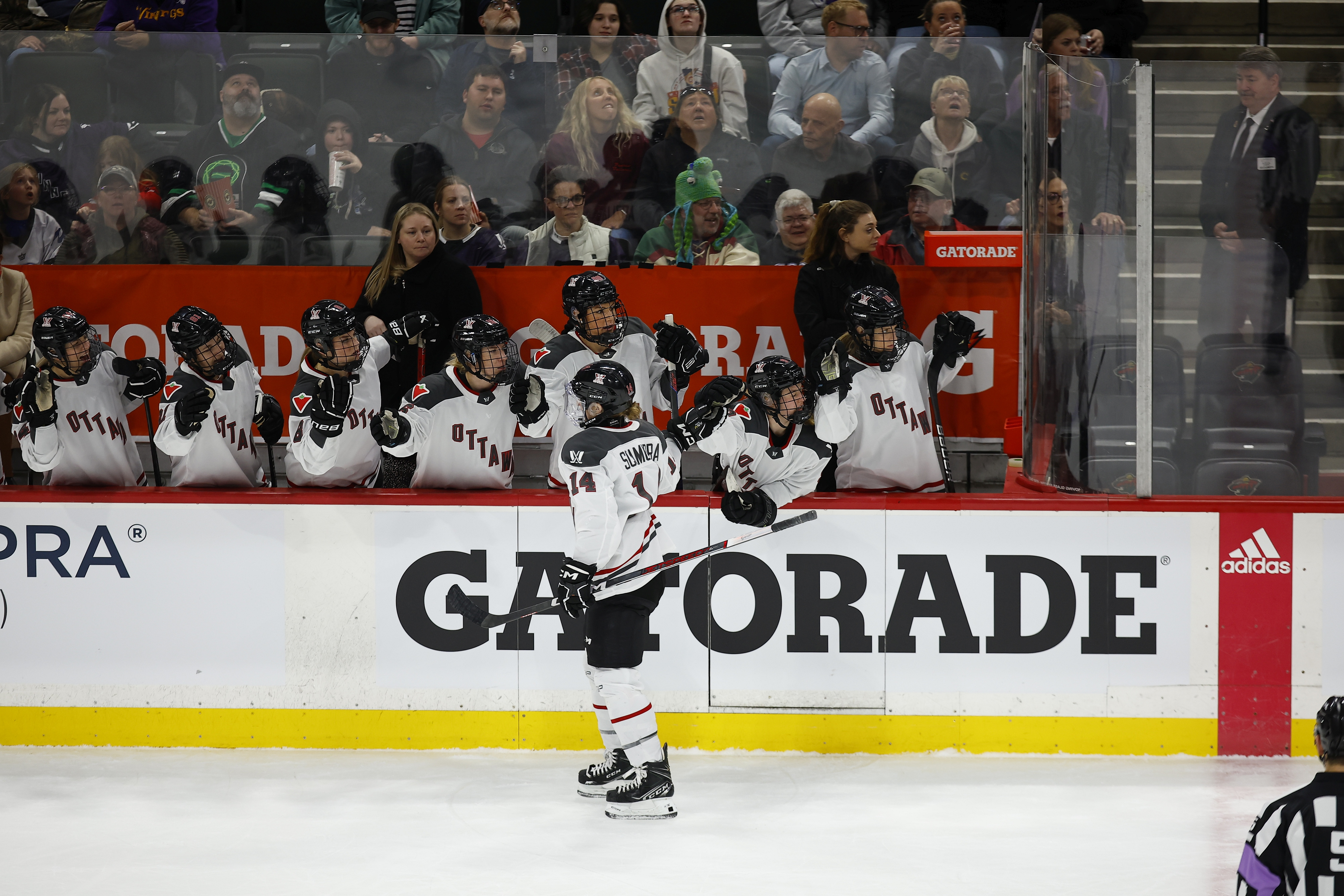
Ottawa's Hayley Scamurra celebrating a goal in 2024.

Ahead of the start of the inaugural 2023–24 season, Ottawa announced that Jenner would serve as team captain, with Clark and Jincy Roese serving as alternate captains. The first game in franchise history took place on January 2, 2024, when Ottawa hosted PWHL Montreal at the TD Place Arena. The game set a new attendance record for a professional women's hockey game at 8,318. Hayley Scamurra scored the first goal in franchise history to give the hosts a 1–0 lead; however, Montreal would go on to win in overtime with a 3–2 score. Ottawa secured its first win at its second game, a 5–1 win against PWHL Toronto on January 13. Its first win at home came on January 23, also against Toronto. Ottawa would go on to miss the inaugural PWHL playoffs, eliminated from contention with a 5–2 loss against Toronto in the last game of the season. However, despite missing the playoffs, Ottawa led the PWHL in attendance during its inaugural season. Ottawa's finish meant they were awarded the second overall selection in the 2024 PWHL draft.

=== 2024–2025 Season ===
The team's second season marked a major breakthrough for the team in their second PWHL campaign. Finishing third in the regular season with a 12–2–4–12 record, they surged into the playoffs and upset the top-seeded Montréal Victoire in a dramatic semifinal series that included a four-overtime thriller. Led by rookie goaltender Gwyneth Philips, who posted a stellar .952 save percentage and was named Ilana Kloss Playoff MVP, Ottawa advanced to their first Walter Cup Final. Despite taking Game 1, the Charge fell to the Minnesota Frost in four tightly contested games that all ended in overtime. The season showcased Ottawa's rise as a gritty, defensively strong contender with a bright future.

=== 2025–2026 Season ===
The Charge was able to secure a place in the Walter Cup playoffs again in their third season. It came down to the final regular season game, where Ottawa finished with a shutout win against the Toronto Sceptres. While they were able to make it past the semi-finals against the Boston Fleet, they lost to the Montreal Victoire in game 4 of their series.

=== Venue Change ===
On November 7, 2025, Ottawa City Council approved the proposal to demolish TD Place Arena and build a new arena as part of the Lansdowne 2.0 redevelopment project. This plan garnered much criticism from the Charge and the PWHL due to a significant reduction in seating capacity from 8,585 to 5,850 seats. In comparison, the average fan attendance for Charge home games during the 2024–25 PWHL season was 6,768, rising to 8,348 for weekend regular season games.

PWHL executives Jayna Hefford and Amy Scheer delegated to city council on October 29 regarding their opposition to the plan. In an interview with the Ottawa Citizen, Scheer stated that they had "been having conversations for well over a year talking about capacity being an issue with both the Mayor and OSEG". Ottawa mayor Mark Sutcliffe argued that increasing the capacity of the new arena would not be economically viable as the team is expected to outgrow it in short time. He suggested relocating to a larger arena in the metropolitan area, such as the Canadian Tire Centre, but the league and fanbase had been adamant that the team remain in the central part of the city. The team would eventually decide to make the move to the Canadian Tire Centre for the 2026–27 season.

== Future ==
The team will play their first season at the Canadian Tire Centre this year. With the planned construction of a new arena at LeBreton Flats, a move has been speculated as the future of the Canadian Tire Centre is uncertain, but no deal has been made.

== Season-by-season record ==
Key of colours and symbols
Colour/symbol	Explanation
†	Indicates League Championship
*	Indicates Regular Season Championship

Year by year results
Season	GP	RW	OW	OL	RL	Pts	GF	GA	GD	Finish	Playoffs
2023–24	24	8	1	6	9	32	62	63	−1	5th	Did not qualify
2024–25	30	12	2	4	12	44	71	80	−9	3rd	Lost Walter Cup Final, 1–3 (Minnesota Frost)
2025–26	30	9	8	1	12	44	71	73	−2	4th	Lost Walter Cup Final, 1–3 (Montreal Victoire)

== Team identity ==
Uniform worn by PWHL Ottawa in the league's inaugural season

Inaugural logo as PWHL Ottawa

Like all charter PWHL franchises, Ottawa operated without unique branding for the league's inaugural season—the team wore a league-wide jersey template that featured the city's name diagonally on the front, and was known as PWHL Ottawa. The team did have its own colour scheme, featuring red and grey. The league registered a trademark in October 2023 for the name Ottawa Alert, seemingly in homage to the early 20th-century women's "world series" champions the Ottawa Alerts. However, Ottawa was ultimately given the name Charge when franchise names were unveiled by the PWHL in September 2024. The name Charge references Ottawa's motto, "Advance—Ottawa—En Avant". The Hockey News reported that other names in contention for Ottawa included Advance—another clear reference to the motto—and Guard. In addition to the Charge name, the league unveiled the team's logo, an in-motion unfinished circle that references "OC" initials; yellow was also added to the team's colour scheme.

=== Rivalries ===
==== Toronto Sceptres ====
The Charge and the Sceptres were the first two teams to be in the same province, earning the nickname of the Battle of Ontario. This is reminiscent of the Battle of Ontario between the NHL's Ottawa Senators and Toronto Maple Leafs.

== Players and personnel ==
=== Current roster ===
As of July 17, 2026

No.	Nat	Player	Pos	S/G	Age	Acquired	Birthplace
1	(Finland)	Sanni Ahola	G	L	26	2025	Helsinki, Finland
–	(Canada)	Neena Brick	F	R	23	2026	Regina, Saskatchewan
86	(Canada)	Michela Cava	F	R	32	2025	Thunder Bay, Ontario
–	(Canada)	Sarah Coe	G	L	23	2026	Brooklin, Ontario
25	(Canada)	Emma Greco	D	L	31	2026	Burlington, Ontario
11	(Canada)	Brooke Hobson	D	L	27	2025	Prince Albert, Saskatchewan
17	(United States)	Gabbie Hughes (A)	F	L	27	2023	Lino Lakes, Minnesota
-	(United States)	Vivian Jungels	D	L	23	2026	Edina, Minnesota
71	(Russia)	Fanuza Kadirova	F	L	28	2025	Kukmor, Russia
3	(Canada)	Jocelyne Larocque (C)	D	L	38	2024	Ste. Anne, Manitoba
37	(Canada)	Rebecca Leslie (A)	F	R	30	2024	Ottawa, Ontario
-	(United States)	Tory Mariano	D	R	23	2026	West Seneca, New York
27	(Canada)	Brooke McQuigge	F	L	26	2026	Bowmanville, Ontario
16	(Czech Republic)	Kateřina Mrázová	F	L	34	2023	Kolín, Czech and Slovak Federative Republic
33	(United States)	Gwyneth Philips	G	R	26	2024	Athens, Ohio
-	(Czech Republic)	Tereza Pištěková	F	L	21	2026	Tábor, Czech Republic
9	(Russia)	Vita Poniatovskaia	D	R	23	2025	Chelyabinsk, Russia
-	(United States)	Jordan Ray	F	R	22	2026	Rockledge, Florida
8	(Canada)	Kathryn Reilly	D	R	25	2025	Richmond, British Columbia
88	(Finland)	Ronja Savolainen	D	L	28	2024	Helsinki, Finland
70	(Canada)	Kendra Woodland	G	L	26	2025	Kamloops, British Columbia
23	(Canada)	Sarah Wozniewicz	F	R	23	2025	Cochrane, Alberta

=== Reserves ===
As of April 16, 2026

No.	Nat	Player	Pos	S/G	Age	Acquired	Birthplace
94	(Canada)	Maggy Burbidge	F	R	25	2026	Falmouth, Nova Scotia
42	(Canada)	Alexie Guay	D	L	25	2026	Magog, Quebec
15	(Canada)	Reece Hunt	F	L	25	2025	Nelson, British Columbia

=== Team captain ===
- Brianne Jenner, 2023–2026
- Jocelyne LaRocque, 2026-present

=== Head coach ===
- Carla MacLeod, 2023–present
- Hailey Irwin, 2026-present (Interim Head Coach)

=== First-round draft picks ===
- 2023: Savannah Harmon (5th overall)
- 2024: Danielle Serdachny (2nd overall)
- 2025: Rory Guilday (5th overall)
- 2026: Vivian Jungels (11th overall)
