= List of Boston Fleet draft picks =

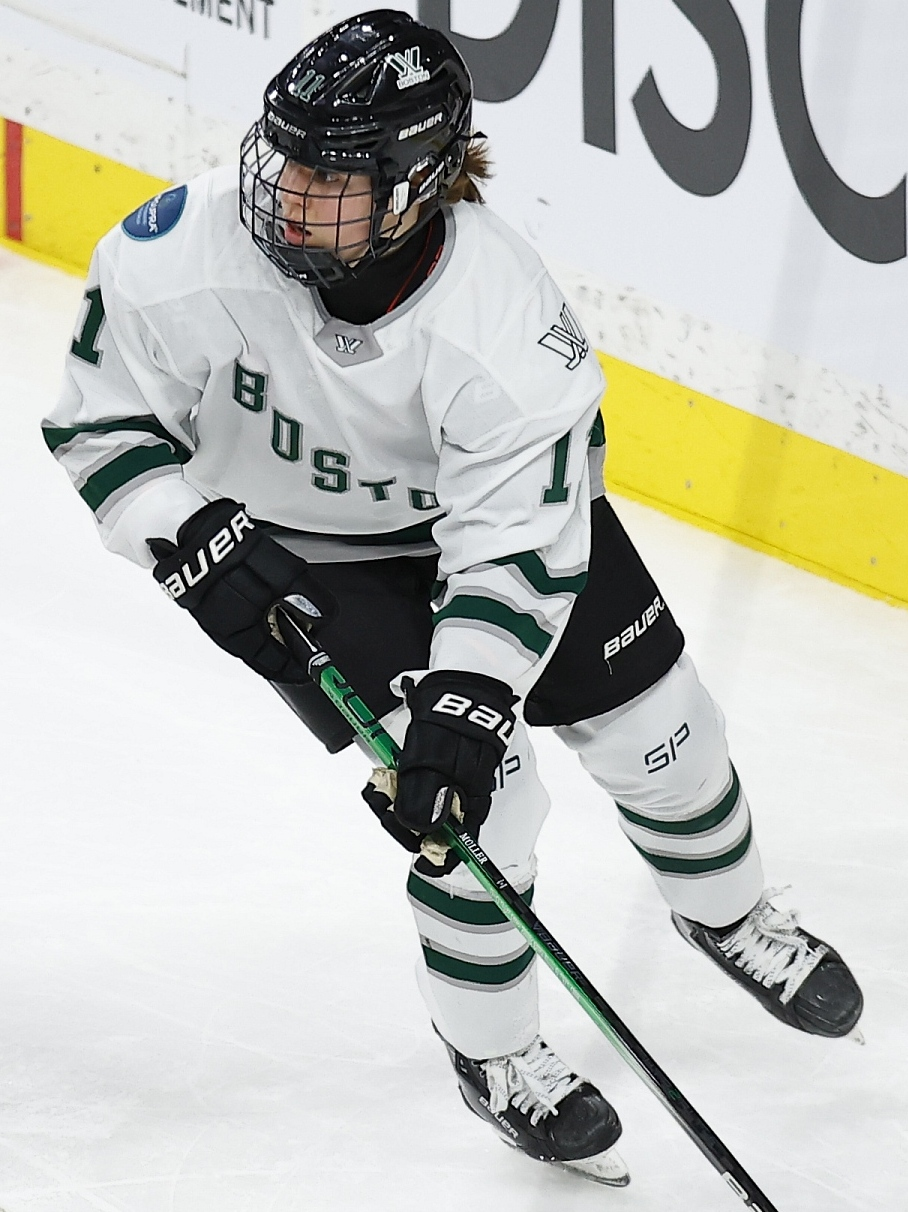
Alina Müller was the first ever draft selection for Boston, taken third overall in 2023.

The Boston Fleet are a professional ice hockey team in the Professional Women's Hockey League (PWHL). Their first draft pick was Alina Müller, selected third overall in the 2023 PWHL draft. Boston has participated in four PWHL Drafts and have drafted 32 players.

== Key ==
General terms and abbreviations
Term or abbreviation	Definition
Draft	The year that the player was selected
Round	The round of the draft in which the player was selected
Pick	The overall position in the draft at which the player was selected
Pos	Position of the player

Position abbreviations
Abbreviation	Definition
G	Goaltender
D	Defense
LW	Left wing
C	Center
RW	Right wing
F	Forward

== Draft picks ==
Full list of Boston Fleet draft picks
Draft	Round	Pick	Player	Nationality	Pos	School/club team	Conference/league
2023	1	3	Alina Müller	Switzerland	F	Northeastern University	Hockey East
2023	2	10	Sophie Jaques	Canada	D	Ohio State University	WCHA
2023	3	15	Jamie Lee Rattray	Canada	F	Team Harvey's	PWHPA
2023	4	22	Loren Gabel	Canada	F	Boston Pride	PHF
2023	5	27	Hannah Brandt	United States	F	Team Sonnet	PWHPA
2023	6	34	Jessica DiGirolamo	Canada	D	Team Adidas	PWHPA
2023	7	39	Theresa Schafzahl	Austria	F	University of Vermont	Hockey East
2023	8	46	Emily Brown	United States	D	Team Sonnet	PWHPA
2023	9	51	Taylor Girard	United States	F	Connecticut Whale	PHF
2023	10	58	Emma Söderberg	Sweden	G	University of Minnesota Duluth	WCHA
2023	11	63	Sophie Shirley	Canada	F	University of Wisconsin	WCHA
2023	12	70	Shiann Darkangelo	United States	F	Toronto Six	PHF
2023	13	75	Emma Buckles	Canada	D	Team Sonnet	PWHPA
2023	14	82	Tatum Skaggs	United States	F	Team Scotiabank	PWHPA
2023	15	87	Jess Healey	Canada	D	Buffalo Beauts	PHF
2024	1	4	Hannah Bilka	United States	F	Ohio State University	WCHA
2024	2	7	Daniela Pejšová	Czech Republic	D	Luleå HF/MSSK	SDHL
2024	4	22	Sydney Bard	United States	D	Colgate University	ECAC
2024	6	34	Shay Maloney	United States	F	Leksands IF	SDHL
2024	7	37	Ilona Markova	Russia	F	Agidel Ufa	ZhHL
2024	7	40	Hadley Hartmetz	United States	D	Ohio State University	WCHA
2025	1	2	Haley Winn	United States	D	Clarkson University	ECAC
2025	2	10	Ella Huber	United States	F	University of Minnesota	WCHA
2025	3	18	Olivia Mobley	United States	F	University of Minnesota Duluth	WCHA
2025	4	26	Riley Brengman	United States	F	Ohio State University	WCHA
2025	5	34	Abby Newhook	Canada	F	Boston College	Hockey East
2025	6	42	Amanda Thiele	United States	G	Ohio State University	WCHA
2026	1	10	Grace Dwyer	United States	D	Cornell University	ECAC
2026	3	27	Leah Stecker	United States	D	Penn State University	AHA
2026	4	46	Jaden Bogden	Canada	F	Northeastern University	Hockey East
2026	5	58	Jenna Goodwin	Canada	F	Frölunda HC	SDHL
2026	6	70	Maeve Kelly	United States	D	Boston University	Hockey East
