= 2020–21 Colgate Raiders women's ice hockey season =

ECAC Tournament champions Quarterfinals, L, 1-0 vs Minnesota Duluth Bulldogs,
- Conference: ECAC
- Home ice: Class of 1965 Arena

Rankings
- USCHO.com: 5

Record
- Overall: 15–7–1
- Home: 10–2–0
- Road: 5–4–1
- Neutral: 0–1–0

Coaches and captains
- Head coach: Greg Fargo
- Assistant coaches: Stefane Decosse; Chelsea Walkland

The 2020–21 Colgate Raiders women's ice hockey season represented Colgate University in the 2020–21 NCAA Division I women's ice hockey season. They were coached by Greg Fargo, in his ninth season, and played their home games at Class of 1965 Arena.

Colgate defeated St. Lawrence 3–2 in the ECAC Championship Game, winning their first championship in program history. They automatically qualified for the 2021 NCAA National Collegiate Women's Ice Hockey Tournament, where the Raiders were ranked as the #4 seed. They lost to Minnesota Duluth 0–1 in overtime in the national quarterfinals.

== Offseason ==
=== Recruiting ===
Player	Position	Nationality	Notes
Kayle Osborne	Goaltender	Canada	Served as an assistant captain for the PWHL's Ottawa Lady Senators; Captured a silver medal with Canada at the IIHF U18 Women's World Championships
Kalty Kaltounkova	Forward	Czech Republic	Won a 2018 NEPSAC Championship with Vermont Academy; Named Czech Republic's MVP at the 2018 IIHF World Championship

== Regular season ==
Sammy Smigliani logged a goal and assist in a 3-2 ECAC Tournament Final versus St. Lawrence, earning the ECAC Tournament Most Outstanding Player Award. Having also recorded a goal in the ECAC semifinals victory versus Quinnipiac, she won a team-high 72.7 percent of her faceoffs, helping Colgate to win 61.2 percent of their overall faceoffs versus St. Lawrence.

=== Standings ===
- 2020–21 ECAC Hockey standings
  	Conference							Overall					
  	GP	W	L	T	PTS	GF	GA	GP	W	L	T	GF	GA
  #5 Colgate † *	14	10	4	0	29	34	19	23	15	7	1	61	41
  St. Lawrence	13	6	7	0	18	23	23	13	6	7	0	30	37
  Clarkson	11	3	8	0	11	15	22	19	8	10	1	54	45
  Quinnipiac	10	5	5	0	11	18	26	16	10	6	0	62	30
  Brown	0	–	–	–	–	–	–	0	–	–	–	–	–
  Cornell	0	–	–	–	–	–	–	0	–	–	–	–	–
  Dartmouth	0	–	–	–	–	–	–	0	–	–	–	–	–
  Harvard	0	–	–	–	–	–	–	0	–	–	–	–	–
  Princeton	0	–	–	–	–	–	–	0	–	–	–	–	–
  RPI	0	–	–	–	–	–	–	0	–	–	–	–	–
  Union	0	–	–	–	–	–	–	0	–	–	–	–	–
  Yale	0	–	–	–	–	–	–	0	–	–	–	–	–
  Championship: March 10, 2021 † indicates conference regular season champion; * indicates conference tournament champion Rankings: USCHO.com; updated March 25, 2021

=== Schedule ===
Date	Opponent^{#}	Rank^{#}	Site	Decision	Result	Record
Regular Season
November 20	at Syracuse		Syracuse, NY	Kayle Osborne	W 3-2 ^{OT}	1–0-0
November 21	Syracuse		Class of 1965 Arena • Hamilton, NY	Kayle Osborne	W 3-1	2–0-0
November 28	at Clarkson Golden Knights	#5	Cheel Arena • Potsdam, NY	Kayle Osborne	W 3-1	3–0-0 (1-0-0)
November 30	Clarkson Golden Knights	#5	Class of 1965 Arena • Hamilton, NY	Kayle Osborne (L)	L 2-3	
December 3	Clarkson Golden Knights		Class of 1965 Arena • Hamilton, NY	Kayle Osborne	W 3-2	
December 5	at Colgate Raiders		Cheel Arena • Potsdam, NY	Kayle Osborne (T, 1)	T 2-2 ^{OT}	1-2-1 (1-2-1)
January 29	at Clarkson Golden Knights		Cheel Arena • Potsdam, NY	L 0-2		
January 31	Clarkson Golden Knights		Class of 1965 Arena • Hamilton, NY	L 1-2		
February 5	Clarkson Golden Knights		Class of 1965 Arena • Hamilton, NY	W 4-2		
February 7	at Clarkson Golden Knights		Cheel Arena • Potsdam, NY	L 2-5		
Playoffs
March 5	Quinnipiac		Class of 1965 Arena • Hamilton, NY	Kayle Osborne	W 2-1	
March 7	St. Lawrence		Class of 1965 Arena • Hamilton, NY	Kayle Osborne	W 3-2	
NCAA Tournament
March 15	vs. Minnesota Duluth Bulldogs		Erie Insurance Arena • Erie, PA	Emma Soderberg (UMD)	L 1-0 ^{OT}	
*Non-conference game. ^{#}Rankings from USCHO.com Poll.

== Roster ==
=== 2020–21 Raiders ===
No.	Nat.	Player	Class	Pos	Height	DoB	Hometown	Previous team
1		Peri Donaldson	Senior	G	5' 6" (1.68 m)		Keller, Texas	St. Paul's School (NEPSAC)
4		Tanner Gates	Junior	G	5' 6" (1.68 m)		Oceanside, California	Anaheim Lady Ducks
8		Kendall Williamson	Senior	F	5' 2" (1.57 m)		Edina, Minnesota	Breck School
9		Danielle Serdachny	Sophomore	F	5' 9" (1.75 m)		Edmonton, Alberta	Pursuit of Excellence
10		Allyson Simpson	Sophomore	D	5' 8" (1.73 m)		Frisco, Texas	Shattuck St. Mary's School
11		Sydney Bard	Sophomore	D	5' 3" (1.6 m)		New Hartford, New York	Toronto Jr. Aeros (PWHL)
14		Eleri McKay	Sophomore	F	5' 6" (1.68 m)		Brookfield, Wisconsin	Chicago Mission
16		Kaitlyn O'Donohoe	Sophomore	F	5' 8" (1.73 m)		Downington, Pennsylvania	Mid-Fairfield Stars
17		Shelby Wood	Senior	D	5' 9" (1.75 m)		Cambridge, Ontario	prevteam=Canada women's national under-18 ice hockey team Cambridge Rivulettes (PWHL)
18		Malia Schneider	Senior	F	5' 6" (1.68 m)		Millarville, Alberta	Pursuit of Excellence
19		Maggie MacEachern	Sophomore	D	5' 6" (1.68 m)		Brooklin, Ontario	Canada women's national under-18 ice hockey team Durham West Lightning (PWHL)
21		Noemi Neubauerová	Junior	F	5' 8" (1.73 m)		Prague, Czech Republic	Czech Republic National Team
26		Taylor Kirwan	Junior		5' 8" (1.73 m)		Gull Lake, Saskatchewan	Swift Current Wildcats
30		Alexa Dobchuk	Junior	G	5' 8" (1.73 m)		Eden Prairie, Minnesota	Eden Prairie HS
31		Kayle Osborne	Freshman	G	5' 8" (1.73 m)		Westport, Ontario	Canada women's national under-18 ice hockey team
44		Delani MacKay	Junior	F	5' 6" (1.68 m)		Brookfield, Wisconsin	Chicago Mission
55		Caroline Ross	Senior	F	5' 7" (1.7 m)		Rochester, New York	Boston University (WHEA)
72		Darcie Lappan	Sophomore	F	5' 7" (1.7 m)		Hartington, Ontario	Kingston Ice Wolves (PWHL)
81		Rosy Demers	Junior	F	5' 4" (1.63 m)		Stanstead, Quebec	Stanstead College
91		Coralie Larose	Senior	F	5' 7" (1.7 m)		Embrun, Ontario	Nepean Wildcats (PWHL)
94		Sammy Smigliani	Sophomore	F	5' 8" (1.73 m)		La Jolla, California	Belle Tire
98		Kalty Kaltounkova	Freshman	F	5' 8" (1.73 m)		Vlašim, Czech Republic	Vermont Academy

== Awards and honors ==
Weekly Awards
Player	Award	Date Awarded	Ref.
Danielle Serdachny	ECAC Player of the Week	January 11, 2021	
Kayle Osborne	ECAC MAC Goaltending Goalie of the Week	February 22, 2021	
Sammy Smigliani	ECAC Player of the Week	February 22, 2021	
Danielle Serdachny	ECAC Player of the Week	March 1, 2021	
Kayle Osborne	ECAC MAC Goaltending Goalie of the Week	March 8, 2021	
Sammy Smigliani	ECAC Player of the Week	March 8, 2021	

Monthly Awards
Player	Award	Date Awarded	Ref.
Kayle Osborne	ECAC MAC Goaltending Goalie of the Week	January 2021	
Kayle Osborne	ECAC MAC Goaltending Goalie of the Month	March 2021	
Sammy Smigliani	ECAC Army ROTC Player of the Month	March 2021	

Player	Award	Ref
Danielle Serdachny	ECAC Player of the Year	
Danielle Serdachny	ECAC Best Forward	
Danielle Serdachny	ECAC Hockey First Team	
Tanner Gates	ECAC Hockey First Team	
Kayle Osborne	ECAC Hockey Rookie Team	
Kalty Kaltounkova	ECAC Hockey Rookie Team	
Danielle Serdachny	CCM/AHCA First Team All-American	
Danielle Serdachny	All-USCHO.com First Team	
