= 2020–21 Clarkson Golden Knights women's ice hockey season =

- Conference: ECAC
- Home ice: Cheel Arena

Record
- Overall: 8-10-1
- Home: 5-3-1
- Road: 3-7-0

Coaches and captains
- Head coach: Matt Desrosiers
- Assistant coaches: Britni Smith; Tony Maci
- Captain(s): Elizabeth Giguere; Meaghan Hector

The Clarkson Golden Knights women's ice hockey program represented Clarkson University during the 2020–21 NCAA Division I women's ice hockey season. The program posted its first losing season since the 2010–11 Clarkson Golden Knights women's ice hockey season, recording eight wins, compared to 10 losses and one tie.

== Offseason ==
=== Recruiting ===
Player	Position	Nationality	Notes
Michelle Pasiechnyk	Goaltender	Canada	Competed with the PWHL's Nepean Jr. Wildcats; Also played for Team Ontario Red
Emily Oosterveld	Forward	Canada	Also competed for the Canadian Inline national team and captured bronze medals at the Inline Worlds in 2016 and 2019.
Kirstyn McQuigge	Forward	Canada	Spent three seasons with the PWHL's Whitby Jr. Wolves
Nicole Gosling	Defense	Canada	Played for Team Ontario at the 2019 Canada Winter Games
Jaden Bogden	Forward	Canada	Former competitive gymnast. Competed for the St. Albert Slash
Florence Lessard	Forward	Canada	Starred at Cégep Limoilou

== Regular season ==
=== Standings ===
- 2020–21 ECAC Hockey standings
  	Conference							Overall					
  	GP	W	L	T	PTS	GF	GA	GP	W	L	T	GF	GA
  #5 Colgate † *	14	10	4	0	29	34	19	23	15	7	1	61	41
  St. Lawrence	13	6	7	0	18	23	23	13	6	7	0	30	37
  Clarkson	11	3	8	0	11	15	22	19	8	10	1	54	45
  Quinnipiac	10	5	5	0	11	18	26	16	10	6	0	62	30
  Brown	0	–	–	–	–	–	–	0	–	–	–	–	–
  Cornell	0	–	–	–	–	–	–	0	–	–	–	–	–
  Dartmouth	0	–	–	–	–	–	–	0	–	–	–	–	–
  Harvard	0	–	–	–	–	–	–	0	–	–	–	–	–
  Princeton	0	–	–	–	–	–	–	0	–	–	–	–	–
  RPI	0	–	–	–	–	–	–	0	–	–	–	–	–
  Union	0	–	–	–	–	–	–	0	–	–	–	–	–
  Yale	0	–	–	–	–	–	–	0	–	–	–	–	–
  Championship: March 10, 2021 † indicates conference regular season champion; * indicates conference tournament champion Rankings: USCHO.com; updated March 25, 2021

=== Schedule ===
Date	Opponent^{#}	Rank^{#}	Site	Decision	Result	Record
Regular Season
November 28	Colgate Raiders		Cheel Arena • Potsdam, NY	Marie-Pier Coulombe (L, 1)	L 1-3	0-1-0 (0-1-0)
November 30	at Colgate Raiders		Class of 1965 Arena • Hamilton, NY	Marie-Pier Coulombe (W, 1)	W 3-2	1-1-0 (1-1-0)
December 3	at Colgate Raiders		Class of 1965 Arena • Hamilton, NY	Michelle Pasiechnyk (L, 1)	L 2-3	1-2-0 (1-2-0)
December 5	Colgate Raiders		Cheel Arena • Potsdam, NY	Marie-Pier Coulombe (W, 2)	T 2-2 ^{OT}	1-2-1 (1-2-1)
January 11	LIU Sharks		Cheel Arena • Potsdam, NY	Marie-Pier Coulombe (W, 3)	W 5-1	2-2-1 (1-2-1)
January 12	LIU Sharks		Cheel Arena • Potsdam, NY	Michelle Pasiechnyk (W, 1)	W 8-1	3-2-1 (1-2-1)
January 16	at Colgate Raiders		Class of 1965 Arena • Hamilton, NY	Marie-Pier Coulombe (L, 2)	L 1-4	3-3-1 (1-3-1)
January 18	Colgate Raiders		Cheel Arena • Potsdam, NY	Marie-Pier Coulombe (L, 3)	L 1-3	3-4-1 (1-4-1)
January 20	St. Lawrence		Cheel Arena • Potsdam, NY	Michelle Pasiechnyk (W, 2)	W 8-1	4-4-1 (2-4-1)
January 23	at Quinnipiac Bobcats		People's United Center • Hamden, CT	Michelle Pasiechnyk (L, 2)	L 1-2 ^{OT}	4-5-1 (2-5-1)
January 24	at Quinnipiac Bobcats		People's United Center • Hamden, CT	Michelle Pasiechnyk (W, 3)	W 3-1	5-5-1 (3-5-1)
January 29	Colgate Raiders		Cheel Arena • Potsdam, NY	Michelle Pasiechnyk (W, 4)	W 2-0	6-5-1 (4-5-1)
January 31	at Colgate Raiders		Class of 1965 Arena • Hamilton, NY	Michelle Pasiechnyk (W, 5)	W 2-1	7-5-1 (5-5-1)
February 5	at Colgate Raiders		Class of 1965 Arena • Hamilton, NY	Michelle Pasiechnyk (L, 3)	L 2-4	7-6-1 (5-6-1)
February 7	Colgate Raiders		Cheel Arena • Potsdam, NY	Marie-Pier Coulombe (W, 4)	W 5-2	8-6-1 (6-6-1)
February 26	St. Lawrence		Cheel Arena • Potsdam, NY	Michelle Pasiechnyk (L, 4)	L 3-4 ^{OT}	8-7-1 (6-7-1)
February 28	at St. Lawrence		Appleton Arena • Canton, NY	Marie-Pier Coulombe (L, 4)	L 1-2	8-8-1 (6-8-1)
March 1	at St. Lawrence		Appleton Arena • Canton, NY	Marie-Pier Coulombe (L, 5)	L 1-5	8-9-1 (6-9-1)
ECAC Tournament
March 5	at St. Lawrence		Appleton Arena • Canton, NY	Michelle Pasiechnyk (L, 5)	L 3-4 ^{OT}	8-10-1 (6-10-1)
*Non-conference game. ^{#}Rankings from USCHO.com Poll.

== Roster ==
=== 2020-21 Golden Knights ===
Current as of 2020–2021 season

No.	Nat.	Player	Class	Pos	Height	DoB	Hometown	Previous team
1		Michelle Pasiechnyk	Freshman	G	5' 9" (1.75 m)		Ottawa, Ontario	Nepean Jr. Wildcats
4		Avery Mitchell	Senior	D	5' 4" (1.63 m)	1999-08-30	Pickering, Ontario	Toronto Jr. Aeros
6		Stephanie Markowski	Sophomore	D	5' 8" (1.73 m)	2001-08-24	Edmonton, Alberta	Pursuit of Excellence
7		Elizabeth Giguere (C)	Senior	F	5' 10" (1.78 m)	1997-05-08	Quebec, Quebec	Limoilou Titans
8		Gabrielle David	Sophomore	F	5' 4" (1.63 m)	1999-06-22	Drummondville, Quebec	Limoilou Titans
9		Tia Stoddard	Senior	F	5' 0" (1.52 m)	1998-06-09	La Mesa, California	Nepean Jr. Wildcats
10		Emily Oosterveld	Freshman	F	5' 6" (1.68 m)		Waterdown, Ontario	Oakville Jr. Hornets
11		Caitrin Lonergan	Graduate	F	5' 6" (1.68 m)	1997-09-10	Roslindale, Massachusetts	Boston College
12		Sena Hanson	Graduate	F	5' 9" (1.75 m)		New Brighton, Minnesota	Brown University
14		Morgan Helgeson	Junior	F	5' 6" (1.68 m)	1999-05-05	Lake Elmo, Minnesota	Hill-Murray School
18		Meaghan Hector (C)	Senior	D	5' 6" (1.68 m)	1999-03-24	Georgetown, Ontario	Oakville Jr. Hornets
19		Lauren Bernard	Sophomore	D	5' 7" (1.7 m)	2001-07-15	Madison, Ohio	Selects Academy
20		Kristy Pidgeon	Senior	F	5' 10" (1.78 m)	1999-12-16	Ingleside, Ontario	Nepean Jr. Wildcats
21		Nicole Gosling	Freshman	D	5' 7" (1.7 m)		London, Ontario	London Jr. Devilettes
22		Emily Wisnewski	Sophomore	D	5' 9" (1.75 m)	2000-09-05	Plymouth, Minnesota	Wayzata Trojans
23		Miranda Gaudet	Junior	F	5' 7" (1.7 m)	1999-12-21	West Kelowna, British Columbia	Okanagan Hockey Academy
26		Brooke McQuigge	Sophomore	F	5' 8" (1.73 m)	2000-06-09	Bowmanville, Ontario	Whitby Jr. Wolves
27		Jaden Bogden	Freshman	F	5' 10" (1.78 m)		Edmonton, Alberta	St. Albert Slash
28		Florence Lessard	Freshman	F	5' 2" (1.57 m)	1998-03-05	Quebec City, Quebec	Cégep Limoilou
30		Marie Dedert	Sophomore	G	5' 7" (1.7 m)	1996-05-19	Milwaukee, Wisconsin	Selects Academy
33		Marie-Pier Coulombe	Junior	G	5' 5" (1.65 m)	1998-04-26	Carignan, Quebec	Limoilou Titans
37		Amanda Zeglen	Senior	G	5' 5" (1.65 m)	1999-02-15	Calgary, Alberta	The Ohio State University
		Kayla Braley	Sophomore	F	5' 53" (2.87 m)		Black River, New York

== Awards and honors ==
- Marie-Pier Coulombe, ECAC Goaltender of the Week (awarded February 9)
- Elizabeth Giguere, ECAC Player of the Week (awarded February 9)
- Elizabeth Giguere, Top 10 Finalist for the Patty Kazmaier Award
- Caitrin Lonergan, Top 10 Finalist for the Patty Kazmaier Award
- Caitrin Lonergan, All-USCHO.com Second Team
- Michelle Pasiechnyk, Rookie of the Month by Hockey Commissioners Association (January 2021)

=== ECAC Monthly Awards ===
- Caitrin Lonergan, ECAC Army ROTC Player of the Month (January 2021)
- Michelle Pasiechnyk, ECAC MAC Goaltending Goalie of the Month (January 2021)
