= 2020–21 St. Lawrence Saints women's ice hockey season =

- Conference: ECAC

Record
- Overall: 6-7-0
- Conference: 5-5-0
- Home: 4-1-0
- Road: 2-6-0

Coaches and captains
- Head coach: Chris Wells
- Assistant coaches: Ted Wisner; Mare MacDougall Bari; Jared Hatz

The St. Lawrence Saints women's ice hockey program represented St. Lawrence University during the 2020–21 NCAA Division I women's ice hockey season.

== Offseason ==
=== Recruiting ===
| Player | Position | Nationality | Notes |
|---|---|---|---|
| Melissa Jefferies | Defense | Canada | Played with the PWHL's Kingston Jr. Ice Wolves for four seasons |
| Nora Wagner | Forward | United States | With Eden Prairie High School, earned All-Lake Conference honors and won the Hobey Baker School Character Award |
| Taylor Lum | Forward | Canada | Played for Team Ontario Red and won the 2019 Canadian National Women's U18 title |
| Kristina Bahl | Defense | Canada | Served as the captain of the PWHL's Oakville Junior Hornets in the 2019-20 season |
| Rachel Bjorgan | Forward | Canada | An assistant captain for the PWHL's Whitby Wolves. Earned the Female Athlete of the Year Award twice at Trinity College |

== Regular season ==
=== Standings ===
- 2020–21 ECAC Hockey standings
  | | Conference | | | | | | | Overall | | | | | |
  | | GP | W | L | T | PTS | GF | GA | GP | W | L | T | GF | GA |
  |---|---|---|---|---|---|---|---|---|---|---|---|---|---|
  | #5 Colgate † * | 14 | 10 | 4 | 0 | 29 | 34 | 19 | 23 | 15 | 7 | 1 | 61 | 41 |
  | St. Lawrence | 13 | 6 | 7 | 0 | 18 | 23 | 23 | 13 | 6 | 7 | 0 | 30 | 37 |
  | Clarkson | 11 | 3 | 8 | 0 | 11 | 15 | 22 | 19 | 8 | 10 | 1 | 54 | 45 |
  | Quinnipiac | 10 | 5 | 5 | 0 | 11 | 18 | 26 | 16 | 10 | 6 | 0 | 62 | 30 |
  | Brown | 0 | – | – | – | – | – | – | 0 | – | – | – | – | – |
  | Cornell | 0 | – | – | – | – | – | – | 0 | – | – | – | – | – |
  | Dartmouth | 0 | – | – | – | – | – | – | 0 | – | – | – | – | – |
  | Harvard | 0 | – | – | – | – | – | – | 0 | – | – | – | – | – |
  | Princeton | 0 | – | – | – | – | – | – | 0 | – | – | – | – | – |
  | RPI | 0 | – | – | – | – | – | – | 0 | – | – | – | – | – |
  | Union | 0 | – | – | – | – | – | – | 0 | – | – | – | – | – |
  | Yale | 0 | – | – | – | – | – | – | 0 | – | – | – | – | – |
  Championship: March 10, 2021 † indicates conference regular season champion; * indicates conference tournament champion Rankings: USCHO.com; updated March 25, 2021

=== Schedule ===
| Date | Opponent^{#} | Rank^{#} | Site | Decision | Result | Record |
Regular Season
| January 20 | at Clarkson Golden Knights | | Cheel Arena • Potsdam, NY | Michelle Pasiechnyk (CLRK) | L 1-8 | 0-1-0 (0-1-0) |
| January 22 | at Colgate Raiders | | Class of 1965 Arena • Hamilton, NY | Kayle Osborne (COL) | L 2-3 ^{OT} | 0-2-0 (0-2-0) |
ECAC Tournament
| March 5 | Clarkson Golden Knights | | Appleton Arena • Canton, NY | Lucy Morgan | W 4-3 ^{OT} | 0-1-0 (0-1-0) |
*Non-conference game. ^{#}Rankings from USCHO.com Poll.

== 2020-21 Saints ==
| No. | Nat. | Player | Class | Pos | Height | DoB | Hometown | Previous team |
|---|---|---|---|---|---|---|---|---|
| 1 | | Grace Smith | Junior | G | 5' 4" (1.63 m) | | Ithaca, New York | Northfield Mount Hermon |
| 2 | | Melissa Jefferies | Freshman | D | 5' 8" (1.73 m) | | Kingston, Ontario | Kingston Jr Ice Wolves |
| 6 | | Claire Dudley | Junior | D | 5' 5" (1.65 m) | | Westwood, Massachusetts | Milton Academy |
| 7 | | Jessica Poirier | Senior | F | 5' 6" (1.68 m) | | Green Valley, Ontario | Ontario Hockey Academy |
| 9 | | Brittney Gout | Senior | F | 5' 3" (1.6 m) | | Caledon, Ontario | Brampton Canadettes |
| 12 | | Nora Wagner | Freshman | F | 5' 8" (1.73 m) | | Eden Prairie, Minnesota | Brampton Canadettes |
| 15 | | Lily Wildman | Senior | D | 5' 7" (1.7 m) | | Great Falls, Virginia | North American Hockey Academy |
| 16 | | Rachel Teslak | Sophomore | D | 5' 6" (1.68 m) | | Cranbrook, British Columbia | Ontario Hockey Academy |
| 17 | | Laura Cote | Sophomore | F | 5' 4" (1.63 m) | | Burlington, Ontario | Canada U18 National Team |
| 19 | | Taylor Lum | Freshman | F | 5' 8" (1.73 m) | | Etobicoke, Ontario | Etobicoke Jr Dolphins (PWHL) |
| 20 | | Gabi Jones | Freshman | F | 5' 10" (1.78 m) | | Potsdam, New York | Ottawa Lady Senators (PWHL) |
| 22 | | Charlea Pedersen | Senior | F | 5' 10" (1.78 m) | | Bowmanville, Ontario | Durham West Jr. Lightning (PWHL) |
| 23 | | Chloé Puddifant | Sophomore | F | 5' 3" (1.6 m) | | Calgary, Alberta | Rocky Mountain Raiders |
| 24 | | Aly McLeod | Freshman | F | 5' 3" (1.6 m) | | Stratford, Ontario | Cambridge Rivulettes (PWHL) |
| 25 | | Stephanie Voge | Junior | F/D | 5' 7" (1.7 m) | | Sun Prairie, Wisconsin | East Coast Wizards |
| 26 | | Kristen Guerriero | Junior | D | 5' 7" (1.7 m) | | Montreal, Quebec | Dawson College; Team Quebec U18 (RSEQ) |
| 30 | | Jaimie Rainville | Junior | G | 5' 8" (1.73 m) | | Welland, Ontario | Stoney Creek Jr. Sabres (PWHL) |
| 31 | | Caitlin Whitehead | Sophomore | G | 5' 8" (1.73 m) | | Ottawa, Ontario | Ottawa Lady Senators (PWHL) |
| 32 | | Lucy Morgan | Sophomore | G | 5' 7" (1.7 m) | | Mandan, North Dakota | Maple Grove High School |
| 51 | | Anna Segedi | Sophomore | F | 5' 5" (1.65 m) | | Commerce Township, Michigan | Belle Tire U19 |
| 54 | | Shailynn Snow | Sophomore | D | 5' 4" (1.63 m) | | Bay Roberts, Newfoundland | Canada U18 National Team (PWHL) |
| 88 | | Julia Gosling | Sophomore | D | 5' 11" (1.8 m) | | London, Ontario | Canada U18 National Team; London Jr. Devilettes (PWHL) |
| 91 | | Kristina Bahl | Freshman | D | 5' 8" (1.73 m) | | Mississauga, Ontario | Oakville Jr. Hornets (PWHL) |
| 93 | | Rachel Bjorgan | Freshman | F | 5' 6" (1.68 m) | | Ennismore, Ontario | Whitby Jr. Wolves (PWHL) |

== Awards and honors ==
- Rachel Bjorgan, Adirondack Health Rookie of the Week (Awarded March 8, 2021)
- Taylor Lum, ECAC Adirondack Health Rookie of the Month (March 2021)
