= Taylor Lum =

Canadian ice hockey player (born 2002)

- Born: 1 April 2002 (age 24) Etobicoke, Ontario, Canada
- Height: 160 cm (5 ft 3 in)
- Weight: 61 kg (134 lb; 9 st 8 lb)
- Position: Forward
- Shoots: Left
- AHA team Former teams: Penn State Nittany Lions; St. Lawrence Saints; KRS Vanke Rays
- National team: China
- Playing career: 2020–present

Lin Jiaxin
- Traditional Chinese: 林嘉欣
- Simplified Chinese: 林嘉欣
Transcriptions
Standard Mandarin
- Hanyu Pinyin: Lín Jiāxīn
Yue: Cantonese
- Yale Romanization: Làhm Gāyān

Taylor Lum (born 1 April 2002), also known by the Chinese name Lin Jiaxin (Chinese: 林嘉欣; Cantonese Yale: Làhm Gāyān), is a Canadian ice hockey player. She played the 2025–26 season with the Penn State Nittany Lions women's ice hockey program in the Atlantic Hockey America (AHA) conference of the NCAA Division I.

== Playing career ==
Lum began her college ice hockey career with the St. Lawrence Saints women's ice hockey program in the ECAC Hockey conference of the NCAA Division I during the 2020–21 season.

She joined the KRS Vanke Rays in the 2021–22 season of the Russian Zhenskaya Hockey League (ZhHL). The team's roster for 2021–22 comprised only players eligible to represent China at the upcoming Olympics, giving head coach Brian Idalski extensive time to assess individual play before building the national team. Lum's eligibility was rooted in her Chinese heritage.

== International play ==
Lum represented China in the women's ice hockey tournament at the 2022 Winter Olympics in Beijing.

== Career statistics ==
=== Regular season and playoffs ===
			Regular season					Playoffs
Season	Team	League	GP	G	A	Pts	PIM	GP	G	A	Pts	PIM
2017–18	Stoney Creek Sabres	ProvWHL	3	0	1	1	0	2	0	0	0	0
2018–19	Stoney Creek Sabres	ProvWHL	38	10	10	20	2	11	2	2	4	6
2019–20	Etobicoke Jr. Dolphins	ProvWHL	38	6	25	31	8	3	3	0	3	0
2020–21	St. Lawrence Saints	ECAC	13	1	5	6	2	–	–	–	–	–
2021–22	KRS Vanke Rays	ZhHL	22	3	1	4	10	0	0	0	0	0
2022–23	St. Lawrence Saints	ECAC	38	8	5	13	2	–	–	–	–	–
2023–24	St. Lawrence Saints	ECAC	40	4	18	22	0	–	–	–	–	–
2024–25	St. Lawrence Saints	ECAC	37	9	7	16	4	–	–	–	–	–
2025–26	Penn State Nittany Lions	AHA	36	4	4	8	2	–	–	–	–	–
Provincial WHL totals			79	16	36	52	10	16	5	2	7	6
NCAA totals			164	26	39	65	10	–	–	–	–	–

Sources: USCHO

=== International ===
Year	Team	Event	Result	GP	G	A	Pts	PIM
2022	China	OG	9th	4	0	1	1	0
