= Wayne Dean Sportsmanship Award =

- Sport: Ice hockey
- Awarded for: The ECAC Hockey student-athlete (men’s or women’s) who demonstrates the highest level of integrity and sportsmanship

History
- First award: 2023
- Most recent: Stephanie Bourque

The Wayne Dean Sportsmanship Award is an annual award given out at the conclusion of the ECAC Hockey regular season to the student-athlete (men's or women's) who demonstrates the highest level of integrity and sportsmanship. It was first awarded in 2023.

The award is named in honor of former Yale deputy director of athletics, Wayne Dean. Dean played a significant role in the development of ECAC Hockey from the time of his arrival in 1986 to his retirement in 2020. Dean died in November 2020, shortly after his retirement.

== Award winners ==
Year	Winner	School	Ref.
2023	Danielle Serdachny	Colgate	
2024	Ben Tupker	Union	
2025	Kendall Cooper	Quinnipiac	
2026	Stephanie Bourque	Union	

=== Winners by school ===
School	Winners
Colgate	1
Quinnipiac	1
Union	2

== See also ==
- ECAC Hockey Awards
