= Colgate Raiders ice hockey =

Colgate Raiders ice hockey may refer to either of the ice hockey teams that represent Colgate University:

- Colgate Raiders men's ice hockey
- Colgate Raiders women's ice hockey
