= Danielle Marmer =

American ice hockey coach (born 1994 or 1995)

Danielle Marmer (born April 29, 1994) is an American ice hockey executive, former coach and former player. She currently holds the position of General Manager for the Boston Fleet of the Professional Women's Hockey League (PWHL).

Marmer has also served as a Player Development and Scouting Assistant for the Boston Bruins, making history as the first woman to hold a scouting position for the team. During her career as a player, she was a forward for Quinnipiac University women's hockey from 2013 to 2017.

== Early life ==
Marmer was born in Newton, Massachusetts, on April 29, 1994, and spent her early childhood in Foxboro, Massachusetts. When she was three, her family moved to Dorset, Vermont. She grew up with two sisters, Whitney and Abby, both of whom also played ice hockey. Her mother Susan managed the local Riley Rink, where Danielle and her sisters spent much of their childhood, fostering a deep love for hockey and sports.

== Hockey career ==
Marmer was a forward for the Quinnipiac Bobcats women's hockey from 2013 to 2017. She was a member of the historic 2015–16 ECAC Championship Team when the Bobcats finished with a program-best 30–3–5 record. She played in 132 games for Quinnipiac and finished her career with two goals and 13 assists for 15 points.

Marmer worked as Assistant Coach for Women's Ice Hockey for Connecticut College from 2017 to 2019, and later became the Director of Player Development and Hockey Operations at Quinnipiac, a role she held from 2019 to 2022.

== Career statistics ==
=== Regular season and playoffs ===
			Regular season
Season	Team	League	GP	G	A	Pts	PIM
2013–14	Quinnipiac University	ECAC	29	0	0	0	2
2014–15	Quinnipiac University	ECAC	32	1	2	3	2
2015–16	Quinnipiac University	ECAC	37	1	3	4	5
2016–17	Quinnipiac University	ECAC	34	0	8	8	12
NCAA totals			132	2	13	15	22

== Education ==
Marmer attended The Loomis Chaffee School in Windsor, Connecticut, where she excelled as a three-sport athlete, playing ice hockey, soccer, and lacrosse. She captained the girls' varsity ice hockey team in her senior year and was selected to attend the USA Hockey Select-17 National Development Camp in 2011. Her accomplishments led her to receive the Outstanding Female Athlete Award upon graduation, and she was recognized as a high honors student for her academic achievements.

Following high school, Marmer attended Quinnipiac University and graduated summa cum laude with a bachelor's degree in Legal Studies in 2017. She also graduated with a Master's of Science in Strategic Communication in 2021.

== Executive career ==
From 2019 to 2022, Marmer worked as Director of Player Development and Hockey Operations for Quinnipiac University.

From 2021 to 2022, Marmer was part of the Diversity and Inclusion Scouting Mentorship Program, an internship hosted by the Boston Bruins, which, coupled with her previous experience in Player Development at QU, would bring her to becoming a Player Development and Scouting Assistant for the Bruins.

In 2022, Marmer joined the Boston Bruins as a Player Development and Scouting Assistant, becoming the first woman to hold an on-ice coaching position with the organization. She focused on evaluating and developing players and contributed to the Bruins’ scouting efforts.

In 2023, Marmer was appointed as the inaugural General Manager for the Boston franchise of the newly established Professional Women's Hockey League (PWHL). As GM, she took on the challenge of building a new team from the ground up. Marmer engineered the first trade in PWHL history, trading Sophie Jaques, the 10th player taken in the inaugural PWHL draft, to Minnesota, in exchange for veteran forward Susanna Tapani and depth defender Abby Cook. The Boston Fleet quickly demonstrated strength in their inaugural season, finishing third in league standings and securing a playoff spot on the final day of the regular season. In the playoffs, the Fleet swept their first-round series against favored Montreal, winning all three games in overtime and advancing to the Walter Cup Finals. There, they faced a tough Minnesota Frost team in a thrilling five-game series. Although the Fleet narrowly missed winning the Walter Cup, losing in the final game on May 29, 2024, their performance solidified the team as a formidable contender in the league's inaugural season.

== Awards and honors ==
During her tenure at Quinnipiac, Marmer achieved several academic and athletic honors:

- Dean's List: Named to Quinnipiac's Dean's List five times.^{6}
- Summa Cum Laude: Graduated with the highest honors.^{6}
- National Scholar Athlete Award: Recognized for outstanding academic and athletic performance.^{6}
- Quinnipiac Scholar Athlete Award: Honored for excellence in academics and athletics.^{6}
- ECAC All-Academic Team: Named to the Eastern College Athletic Conference All-Academic Team for four consecutive years.
