= François Méthot =

Canadian ice hockey player

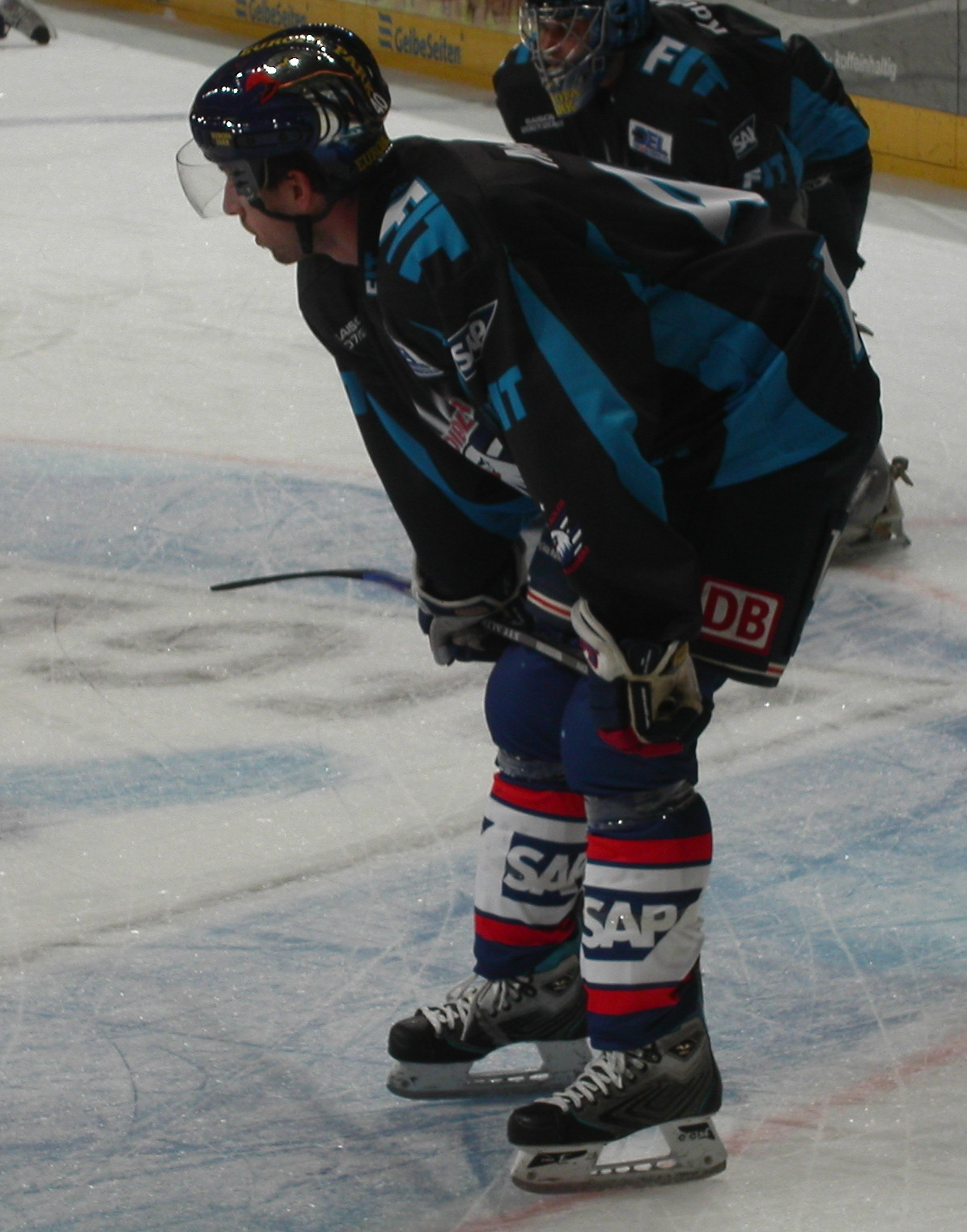
- Méthot with the Adler Mannheim in 2007
- Born: April 26, 1978 (age 48) Montreal, Quebec, Canada
- Height: 6 ft 0 in (183 cm)
- Weight: 184 lb (83 kg; 13 st 2 lb)
- Position: Centre
- Shot: Right
- Played for: Rochester Americans; Portland Pirates; Augsburger Panther; Nuremberg Ice Tigers; Adler Mannheim; Krefeld Pinguine; EHC München
- NHL draft: 54th overall, 1996; Buffalo Sabres
- Playing career: 1998–2015

François Méthot (born April 26, 1978) is a former professional ice hockey player. He is the current head coach for the Boston Fleet of the Professional Women's Hockey League (PWHL). He was the Buffalo Sabres' third pick, 54th overall, in the 1996 NHL entry draft from the Shawinigan Cataractes, but only ever played exhibition games in the NHL.

== Playing career ==
Born in Montreal, Quebec, he played five seasons with the Rochester Americans and one with the Portland Pirates, both of the American Hockey League, before moving to Germany. He played one season each for the Augsburger Panther and the Nürnberg Ice Tigers before going to Mannheim.

On May 24, 2011, Methot left Mannheim after five seasons and signed a one-year contract with fellow DEL team, Krefeld Pinguine.

== Coaching career ==
On June 2, 2026, Methot was announced as the new head coach for the Boston Fleet.

== Career statistics ==
| | | | Regular season | | | | | Playoffs |
| Season | Team | League | GP | G | A | Pts | PIM | GP | G | A | Pts | PIM |
|---|---|---|---|---|---|---|---|---|---|---|---|---|
| 1994–95 | St. Hyacinthe Lasers | QMJHL | 60 | 14 | 38 | 52 | 22 | 5 | 0 | 1 | 1 | 0 |
| 1995–96 | St. Hyacinthe Lasers | QMJHL | 68 | 32 | 62 | 94 | 22 | 12 | 6 | 6 | 12 | 4 |
| 1996–97 | Rouyn-Noranda Huskies | QMJHL | 47 | 21 | 30 | 51 | 22 | — | — | — | — | — |
| 1996–97 | Shawinigan Cataractes | QMJHL | 18 | 9 | 17 | 26 | 2 | 7 | 2 | 6 | 8 | 2 |
| 1997–98 | Shawinigan Cataractes | QMJHL | 36 | 23 | 42 | 65 | 10 | 6 | 1 | 3 | 4 | 5 |
| 1998–99 | Rochester Americans | AHL | 58 | 5 | 8 | 13 | 8 | 9 | 0 | 1 | 1 | 0 |
| 1999–00 | Rochester Americans | AHL | 80 | 14 | 18 | 32 | 20 | 21 | 2 | 4 | 6 | 16 |
| 2000–01 | Rochester Americans | AHL | 79 | 22 | 33 | 55 | 35 | 4 | 1 | 3 | 4 | 0 |
| 2001–02 | Rochester Americans | AHL | 59 | 17 | 17 | 34 | 28 | 2 | 1 | 0 | 1 | 0 |
| 2002–03 | Rochester Americans | AHL | 58 | 19 | 34 | 53 | 22 | 3 | 0 | 4 | 4 | 0 |
| 2003–04 | Portland Pirates | AHL | 53 | 8 | 19 | 27 | 12 | — | — | — | — | — |
| 2004–05 | Augsburger Panther | DEL | 52 | 21 | 23 | 44 | 8 | 5 | 0 | 3 | 3 | 4 |
| 2005–06 | Nürnberg Ice Tigers | DEL | 45 | 14 | 29 | 43 | 10 | 4 | 0 | 0 | 0 | 0 |
| 2006–07 | Adler Mannheim | DEL | 52 | 19 | 38 | 57 | 20 | 11 | 1 | 7 | 8 | 2 |
| 2007–08 | Adler Mannheim | DEL | 45 | 13 | 32 | 45 | 18 | 3 | 1 | 3 | 4 | 0 |
| 2008–09 | Adler Mannheim | DEL | 51 | 20 | 35 | 55 | 18 | 9 | 2 | 8 | 10 | 10 |
| 2009–10 | Adler Mannheim | DEL | 56 | 12 | 26 | 38 | 18 | 2 | 0 | 0 | 0 | 2 |
| 2010–11 | Adler Mannheim | DEL | 41 | 7 | 15 | 22 | 10 | 4 | 0 | 0 | 0 | 0 |
| 2011–12 | Krefeld Pinguine | DEL | 43 | 16 | 21 | 37 | 6 | — | — | — | — | — |
| 2012–13 | Krefeld Pinguine | DEL | 52 | 14 | 28 | 42 | 12 | 9 | 2 | 8 | 10 | 25 |
| 2013–14 | Krefeld Pinguine | DEL | 33 | 5 | 13 | 18 | 39 | 5 | 1 | 2 | 3 | 2 |
| 2014–15 | Krefeld Pinguine | DEL | 13 | 0 | 9 | 9 | 2 | — | — | — | — | — |
| 2014–15 | EHC München | DEL | 20 | 2 | 11 | 13 | 4 | 4 | 0 | 0 | 0 | 2 |
| AHL totals | | | 387 | 85 | 129 | 214 | 125 | 39 | 4 | 12 | 16 | 16 |
