= Kayle Osborne =

Canadian ice hockey player (born 2002)

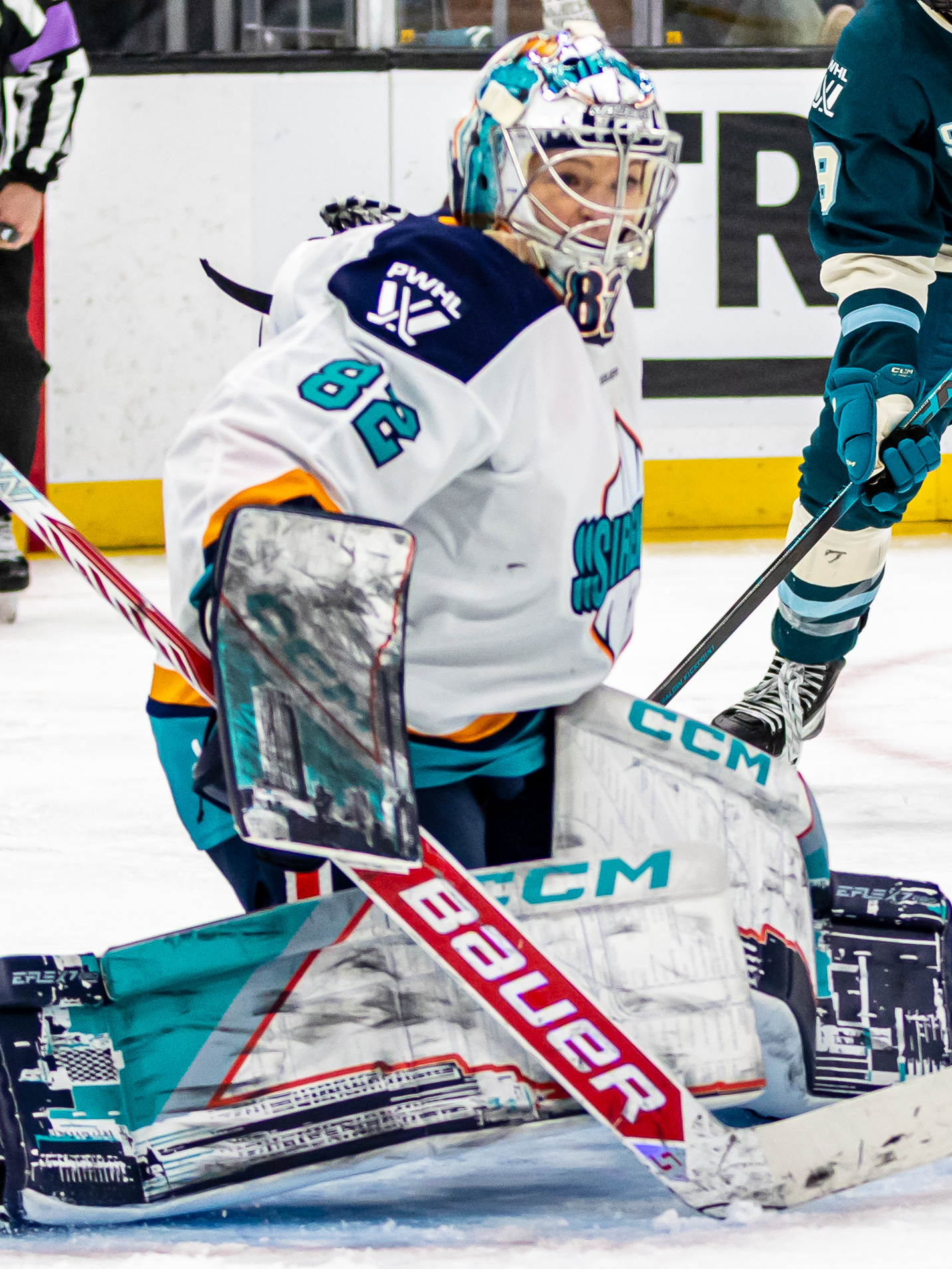
- Osborne with the New York Sirens in 2025
- Born: February 28, 2002 (age 24) Westport, Ontario, Canada
- Height: 5 ft 8 in (173 cm)
- Position: Goaltender
- Catches: Left
- PWHL team Former teams: Hamilton Havoc; New York Sirens
- National team: Canada
- Playing career: 2024–present
Medal record
Olympic Games
Silver medal – second place	2026 Milano Cortina	Team
World Championships
Silver medal – second place	2026 Denmark

Kayle Smith Osborne (born February 28, 2002) is a Canadian professional ice hockey goaltender for the Hamilton Havoc of the Professional Women's Hockey League (PWHL). She played college ice hockey at Colgate University.

== Early life ==
Osborne was born to Debbie Smith, and has a brother, Collin, and a sister, Amanda. She attended John McCrae Secondary School where she played hockey, soccer, and volleyball.

== Playing career ==
=== College ===
Osborne began her collegiate hockey career for Colgate during the 2020–21 season. During her freshman year she appeared in 23 games and posted a 14–7–1 record, with a 1.70 goals against average (GAA), .926 save percentage and two shutouts. Following the season she was named the ECAC Hockey Rookie of the Year and named to the ECAC Hockey All-Rookie Team. During the 2021–22 season, in her sophomore year, she appeared in 20 games and posted a 13–5–1 record, with a 1.95 GAA, .911 save percentage and one shutout.

During the 2022–23 season, in her junior year, she appeared in 19 games and posted a 14–4–1 record, with a 1.75 GAA, .926 save percentage and four shutouts. During the 2023–24 season, in her senior year, she appeared in 26 games and posted a 20–4–1 record, with a 1.28 GAA, .941 save percentage and six shutouts. She finished her collegiate career with a 61–20–4 record, 1.64 GAA and .927 save percentage in 92 games.

=== Professional ===
On June 10, 2024, Osborne was drafted in the fifth round, 28th overall, by PWHL New York in the 2024 PWHL draft. On August 20, 2024, she signed a three-year contract with New York. As a member of the Sirens, she was reunited with her former head coach at Colgate, Greg Fargo. On November 18, 2025, she signed a one-year contract extension with the Sirens.

On June 5, 2026 it was announced that Osborne had signed a three-year contract with expansion team Hamilton Havoc, becoming the second signing in team history.

== International play ==
On January 9, 2026, she was named to Canada's roster to compete at the 2026 Winter Olympics. Osborne was Canada's youngest player named to the 2026 Olympic roster.

On February 7, 2026, Osborne had her first Olympic experience, in uniform for Canada as the backup goaltender.

On November 9, 2026, she got her first win and shutout on the senior national team in a game against Denmark. This was also her first IIHF Women's World Championship start on the senior team.

== Career statistics ==
=== Regular season and playoffs ===
Note: GP = Games played; Min, TOI = Minutes played; W = Wins; L = Losses; T,T/OT = Ties; OTL = Overtime losses; GA = Goals-against; GAA = Goals-against average; SO = Shutouts; SV% = Save percentage;

			Regular season									Playoffs
Season	Team	League	GP	W	L	T/OT	MIN	GA	SO	GAA	SV%	GP	W	L	MIN	GA	SO	GAA	SV%
2020–21	Colgate University	ECAC	23	14	7	1	1,376	39	3	1.70	.926	—	—	—	—	—	—	—	—
2021–22	Colgate University	ECAC	20	13	5	1	1,137	37	1	1.95	.911	—	—	—	—	—	—	—	—
2022–23	Colgate University	ECAC	19	14	4	1	1,100	32	4	1.75	.926	—	—	—	—	—	—	—	—
2023–24	Colgate University	ECAC	30	20	4	1	1,495	32	6	1.28	.941	—	—	—	—	—	—	—	—
2024–25	New York Sirens	PWHL	10	2	4	0	568	21	1	2.22	.916	—	—	—	—	—	—	—	—
PWHL totals			10	2	4	0	568	21	1	2.22	.916	—	—	—	—	—	—	—	—

=== International ===
Note: GP = Games played; Min, TOI = Minutes played; W = Wins; L = Losses; T,T/OT = Ties; OTL = Overtime losses; GA = Goals-against; GAA = Goals-against average; SO = Shutouts; SV% = Save percentage;

				Regular season
Year	Team	Event	Result	GP	W	L	T/OT	MIN	GA	SO	GAA	SV%
2019–20	Canada	U18	2nd place, silver medalist(s)	2	1	0	0	60:00	0.98	0	0.00	.923
2026	Canada	WC		1	1	0	0	60:00	0	1	0.00	1.000
