= Danielle Serdachny =

Canadian ice hockey player (born 2001)

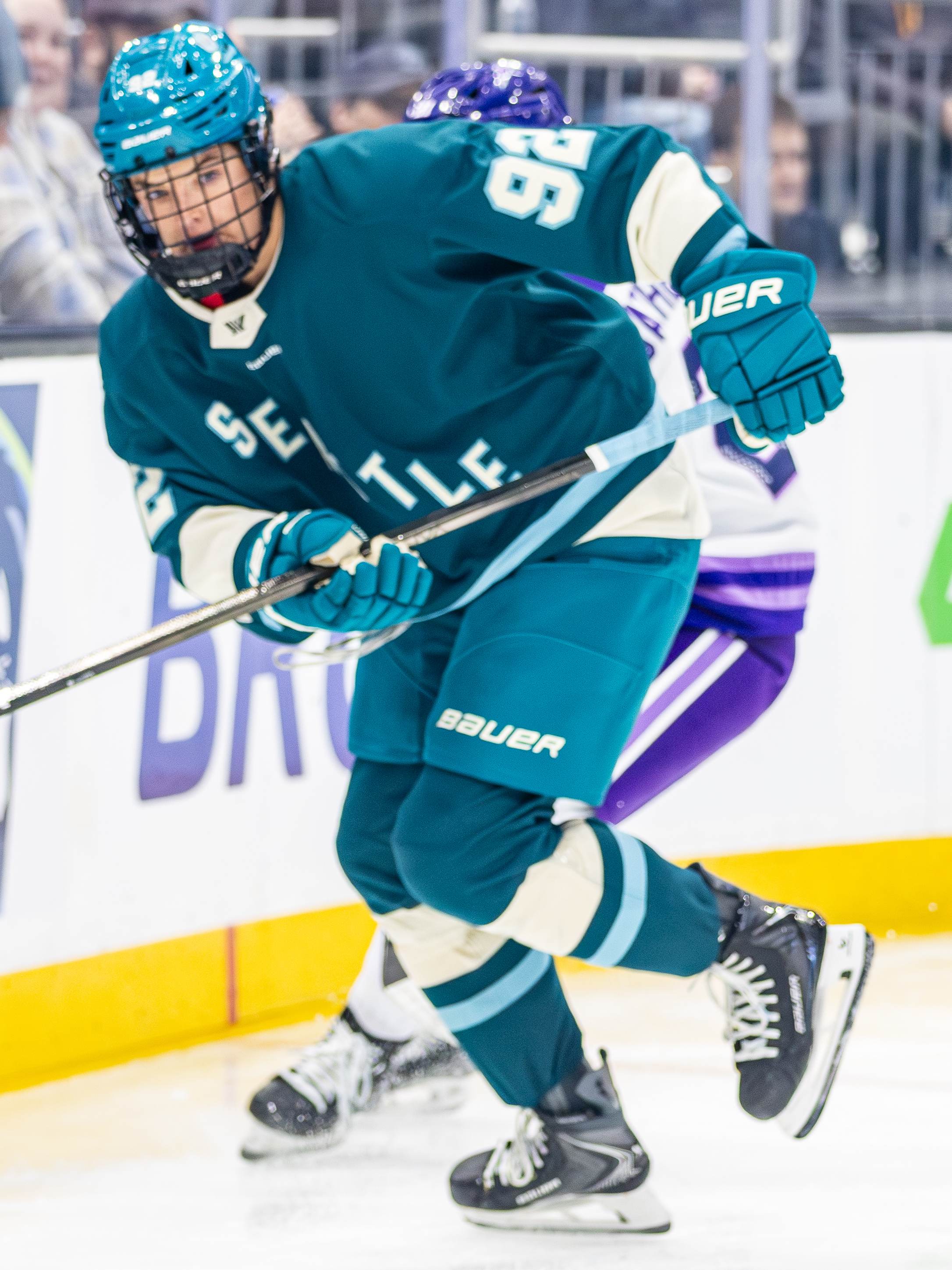
- Serdachny with the Seattle Torrent in 2025
- Born: May 12, 2001 (age 25) Edmonton, Alberta, Canada
- Height: 5 ft 9 in (175 cm)
- Position: Forward
- Shoots: Right
- PWHL team Former teams: Seattle Torrent; Ottawa Charge
- National team: Canada
- Playing career: 2019–present
Medal record
World Championship
Gold medal – first place	2024 United States
Silver medal – second place	2023 Canada
Silver medal – second place	2025 Czechia
Silver medal – second place	2026 Denmark

Danielle Serdachny (born May 12, 2001) is a Canadian professional ice hockey player for the Seattle Torrent of the Professional Women's Hockey League (PWHL) and member of Canada women's national ice hockey team. She was drafted second overall by PWHL Ottawa in the 2024 PWHL draft.

Serdachny played five seasons of college ice hockey at Colgate University from 2019 to 2024, where she became one of the most decorated players in program history. She was a two-time ECAC Hockey Player of the Year (2021, 2023), a two-time AHCA First-Team All-American, and a top-three finalist for the Patty Kazmaier Memorial Award in 2023. She finished her collegiate career as Colgate's all-time leading scorer with 213 points and helped the Raiders win four consecutive ECAC Tournament Championships.

Internationally, Serdachny has represented Canada at three IIHF World Women's Championships, winning gold in 2024 and silver in 2023 and 2025. She scored the game-winning overtime goal in the gold medal game of the 2024 IIHF Women's World Championship against the United States.

== Early life ==
Born in Edmonton, Alberta to and Debra and Steven Serdachny, Danielle was raised in a hockey-centric household, began skating at age two, and started playing organized hockey at age four. Her father, Steve, worked as a skating and skills coach for the National Hockey League's Edmonton Oilers for twelve seasons, making hockey a prominent part of her childhood. She has three siblings: older sister Brooke, younger sister Jordan, and brother Noah, all of whom are hockey players. Her brother Noah played college hockey at Colorado College. Reflecting on her upbringing, Serdachny stated, "Having a dad who works in the hockey industry, you're kind of born to be a hockey player. He's had a huge influence on my career as well as my mom." Her father noted that while his profession as an NHL skating and skills coach exposed all his children to the game continuously, it was ultimately Danielle's dedication and passion that drove her success: "It's been a dream of hers since she's been a little girl, that she wanted to be on Team Canada and represent her country...Hockey's more than a game to her. It's a passion and such a big part of her life."

During her minor hockey career, Serdachny excelled with several teams including the Southside Athletic Club, Maple Leaf Athletic Club, and the Edmonton Pandas, posting 57 goals and 142 points in 110 minor hockey games. She later attended the Pursuit of Excellence Hockey Academy in Kelowna, British Columbia, where she played two seasons in the Canadian Sport School Hockey League (CSSHL). During her first season with Pursuit of Excellence, she recorded 16 goals and 30 assists, and in her final season, she posted 24 goals and 34 assists in 28 games, tallying 104 career points on 40 goals and 64 assists in 49 games for the program. She won consecutive CSSHL Female Prep Division Championships and was named league MVP in the CSSHL.

== Playing career ==
=== College ===
Serdachny played five seasons for the Colgate Raiders from 2019–20 to 2023–24, appearing in 162 career games and recording 71 goals and 142 assists for 213 points. She finished her career as Colgate's all-time leader in career points and single-season assists. Serdachny earned All-ECAC honors in each of her five seasons at Colgate, becoming a three-time All-ECAC First Team selection, two-time ECAC Hockey Player of the Year, and the league's All-Rookie Team member in her first season.

Serdachny began her collegiate hockey career for Colgate during the 2019–20 season. She made her debut for the Raiders on September 21, 2019, in a game against Holy Cross Crusaders where she recorded two goals. She became the first Raider in the past decade to score multiple goals in her first collegiate game. She was named the ECAC Rookie of the Week for the week ending February 10, 2020. She finished the season with 10 goals, 22 assists, one power play goal, one short-handed goal, two game-winning goals, and 69 shots on goal in 38 games. She tied a program record for assists in a season by a freshman. Following an outstanding season she was named to the ECAC All-Rookie team and Colgate women's hockey Rookie of the Year.

During the 2020–21 season, she recorded nine goals, three game-winning goals, three power-play goals, 12 assists and a team-leading 21 points in 23 games. She led the team with six multi-point performances, and led all ECAC players in scoring with 13 points. She was named the ECAC Hockey Player of the Week for the week ending January 11, 2021, after she recorded three goals and one assist during the weekend. She was named the ECAC Hockey Player of the Week for the week ending March 1, 2021, her second Player of the Week honor. Following an outstanding season she was named first-team All-ECAC, ECAC Player of the Year, and ECAC Best Forward. She became the first Player of the Year recipient in Colgate program history. She was also named a First-Team All-USCHO and CCM/AHCA First-Team All-American. She became the first All-American for Colgate in the Division I history, and the first player to earn All-American honors since Heather Murphy won consecutive AWHCA Division III All-America First-Team honors in 2000 and 2001.

On July 14, 2021, Serdachny was named a captain for the 2021–22 season. During her junior year, she recorded 16 goals and 38 assists in 39 games, including three power-play goals, 15 multi-point games, and three game-winning goals. She recorded 28 points in league play, scoring nine goals and 19 assists. She led the ECAC in assists and was tied for the league lead in points. Her 38 assists broke the program record for most assists in a single season, a record she would later surpass. She also had nine multi-assist games and tied the team record for most assists in a game with six against RIT on September 25. Serdachny was named ECAC Hockey Player of the Week twice during the season (October 11 and November 1), earning Player of the Month honors for October. Following the season she was named second-team All-ECAC. Colgate won the ECAC Hockey Tournament Championship, defeating Yale 2–1 in overtime in the championship game.

During the 2022–23 season, in her senior year, she led the league in points with 25 goals and 45 assists in 39 games. She also led the NCAA in points per game with 1.79, tied for third in the NCAA in game winning goals with six, tied for fourth in the NCAA in goals, and led the ECAC in goals. She posted a five-point performance against RIT on October 14 and had 18 multi-point games during the season. Her 45 assists broke her own single-season program record set the previous year, and her 70 points shattered the program record for single-season points, which had previously stood at 55. She also led the NCAA in points per game with 1.79, tied for third in the NCAA in game-winning goals with six, and tied for fourth in the NCAA in goals. On February 11, 2023, in a game against Brown and Yale, Serdachny broke the program record for career points, surpassing the previous mark of 163. She finished the regular season with 172 career points. Serdachny was named ECAC Hockey Forward of the Week three times during the season (February 14, 2023, and November 21, 2023) and earned ECAC Hockey Forward of the Month honors in October 2023. She was also named HCA Player of the Month in October 2023. Following an outstanding season, she was named the ECAC Player of the Year and ECAC Forward of the Year for the second time in her career, becoming a two-time conference Player of the Year.ref name="uscho-2023"/> She was selected to the All-ECAC First Team, named to the ECAC Hockey All-Tournament Team, and earned CCM/AHCA First-Team All-American and All-USCHO First Team honors. She was also named the winner of the inaugural Wayne Dean Sportsmanship Award for her leadership on and off the ice. Following an outstanding season, she was named the ECAC Player of the Year and ECAC Forward of the Year, and a top-three finalist for the Patty Kazmaier Award. Colgate won its third consecutive ECAC Hockey Tournament Championship with an 8–2 victory over Clarkson in the championship game, with Serdachny recording three points. The Raiders finished the season with a 32-5-2 record.

During the 2023–24 season, in her fifth and final season at Colgate, she appeared in 40 games and recorded 22 goals and 39 assists for 61 points. In November, she recorded a four-point night against Harvard and became the first player in program history to record 200 career points. She was tied for third in the NCAA with 61 points and tied for second with 39 assists. Serdachny was named ECAC Hockey Forward of the Week for the fourth time in her career on January 30, 2024. She was selected to the All-ECAC First Team for the third time, earning CCM/AHCA Second Team All-American and All-USCHO Second Team honors. For the second consecutive year, she was named a top-10 finalist for the Patty Kazmaier Memorial Award, marking the third time in program history a Colgate player received the honor. Colgate won its fourth consecutive ECAC Hockey Tournament Championship with a home shutout victory against Clarkson on March 9, 2024, becoming only the second team in league history to claim four consecutive league championships and the first in nearly 30 years. The Raiders earned a No. 3 seed in the 2024 NCAA Division I Women's Hockey Tournament.

=== Professional ===
==== PWHL Ottawa (2024–25) ====
On June 10, 2024, Serdachny was drafted second overall by PWHL Ottawa in the 2024 PWHL draft. On August 20, 2024, she signed a three-year contract with Ottawa through the 2026–27 season. General Manager Mike Hirshfeld stated that the organization was "thrilled to add Danielle as a core piece" and praised her "complete 200-foot hockey game and the skill and goal-scoring she will bring to our lineup."

Serdachny made her professional debut on November 30, 2024, in the season-opening game against the Montreal Victoire at Place Bell. She scored her first professional goal in her debut, with her parents in attendance, though Ottawa lost 4–3 in a shootout. During the 2024–25 season, she recorded two goals and six assists in 30 regular season games, tying for the team lead in rookie scoring. She also recorded 90 faceoff wins during the regular season. Ottawa qualified for the playoffs for the first time in franchise history, and Serdachny recorded her first career playoff point in Game 1 of the semifinals against Montreal at Place Bell, the same building where she had scored her first professional goal. She appeared in all eight playoff games and recorded two assists as Ottawa advanced to the Walter Cup Finals, where they ultimately lost to the Minnesota Frost in four games. She recorded an assist in Game 4 of the Finals, her first point since Game 1 of the semifinals.

==== Seattle Torrent (2025–present) ====
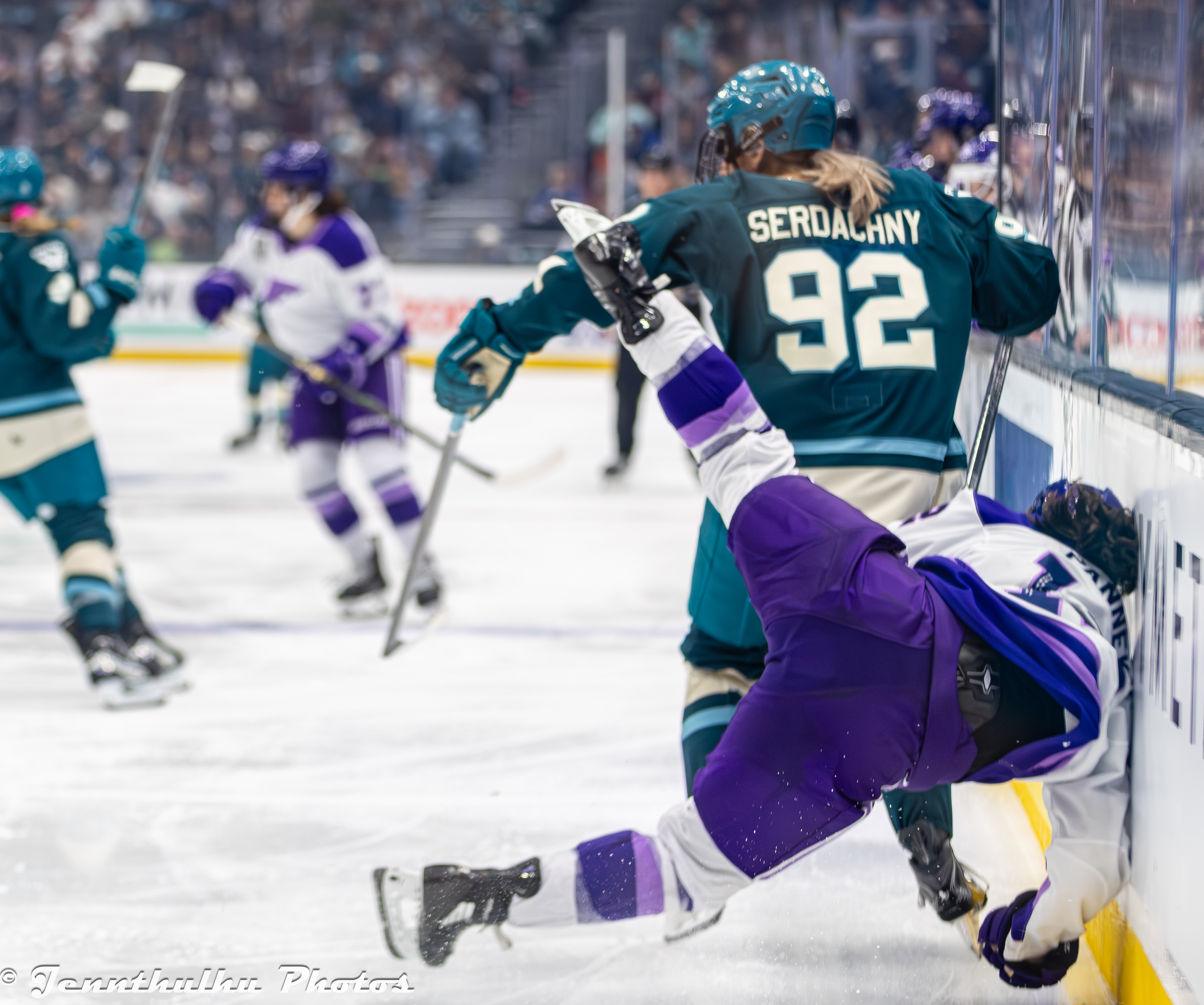
Serdachny during the Seattle Torrent's home opener against the Minnesota Frost at Climate Pledge Arena on November 28, 2025

During the league's expansion to eight teams ahead of the 2025–26 season, Serdachny was left unprotected by the Charge and signed a two-year contract with the Seattle Torrent on June 5, 2025. She was the second player to sign with the expansion Torrent, following Hilary Knight. Seattle General Manager Meghan Turner praised Serdachny's addition to the team, stating: "Danielle is a tremendous addition to our group. She's strong, plays through contact, and she's only beginning to tap into her full potential. Her ability to possess the puck and make plays under pressure will be a big asset for us as we build the identity of PWHL Seattle."

Seattle made their home debut at Climate Pledge Arena on November 28, 2025, against the two-time defending Walter Cup champion Minnesota Frost in front of a record-setting crowd of 16,014 fans, breaking the record for the largest crowd for a women's hockey game in a U.S. arena. The Torrent fell 3–0 to Minnesota, with Serdachny logging over 19 minutes of ice time and recording three shots on goal. On December 28, 2025, Serdachny scored her first goal for the Torrent in a 4–3 loss to the New York Sirens at the American Airlines Center in Dallas as part of the PWHL Takeover Tour. In a home game on March 11, 2026, she scored the game-winning goal at 16:14 of the third period against the first-place Boston Fleet. The win was Seattle's first-ever victory over Boston and ended the Fleet's six-game winning streak.

=== International ===
Medal record

Representing Canada

Ice hockey

World U18 Championship
Gold medal – first place	2019 Japan	

==== Junior ====
Serdachny represented the Canadian under-18 team at the 2019 IIHF World Women's U18 Championship in Obihiro, Japan, where she recorded three goals and one assist in five games. In the semifinals against Russia, Serdachny scored the overtime winner just 44 seconds into the extra period to lift Canada to a 4–3 victory and secure a berth in the gold medal game. In the gold medal game, Canada defeated the United States 3–2 in overtime to win the championship, with Serdachny and Julia Gosling named among Canada's top three players of the tournament. It was Canada's first U18 gold medal since 2014.

==== Senior ====
Serdachny made her debut with the Canada women's national ice hockey team in December 2022, appearing in the fourth and fifth games of the Rivalry Series against the United States. In Game 5 on December 19 in Los Angeles, Serdachny scored her first goal for Team Canada, an overtime winner at 2:16 of the extra period to give Canada a 3–2 victory at Crypto.com Arena. She beat goaltender Nicole Hensley on the short side with a snap shot on a 2-on-1 break with Marie-Philip Poulin.

===== World Championships =====
As of 2026, Serdachny has represented Canada at three consecutive World Championships, winning one gold medal and two silver medals. She first represented Canada at the 2023 IIHF Women's World Championship in Brampton, Ontario, where she recorded one assist in seven games as Canada won a silver medal after falling to the United States 6–3 in the gold medal game.

Serdachny returned to the national team for the 2024 IIHF Women's World Championship in Utica, New York, where she recorded two goals and two assists in seven games. In the gold medal game against the United States on April 14, 2024, Serdachny scored the game-winning goal 5 minutes and 16 seconds into overtime on a power play, giving Canada a 6–5 victory. The United States had been caught with too many players on the ice 3:17 into overtime, and Serdachny's goal came with two seconds remaining on the ensuing power play. She collected a rebound off an Erin Ambrose shot and backhanded it past American goaltender Aerin Frankel. The victory gave Canada its tournament-record 13th gold medal and marked the first time in Women's World Championship history that a gold medal game went to overtime since Marie-Philip Poulin's overtime winner in 2021. The 6–5 final score was the highest-scoring game between the two rivals since the United States' 7–5 win in the 2015 World Championship final.

Serdachny was named to Canada's roster for the 2025 IIHF Women's World Championship in České Budějovice, Czech Republic, marking her third consecutive appearance at the tournament. In the gold medal game against the United States on April 20, 2025, Serdachny scored Canada's first goal in the second period to cut the American lead to 2–1 less than a minute after the U.S. had scored twice in a 29-second span. Canada ultimately fell 4–3 in overtime to the United States, with Serdachny earning a silver medal.

== Personal life ==
During her time at Colgate, Serdachny was named to the ECAC Hockey All-Academic Team in 2020, 2021, and 2022, and was honored on the Raider Academic Honor Roll in 2020. She was also a co-founder and mentor for Rising Raiders, Colgate's mentorship program for young female hockey players in New York. Serdachny is an ambassador for the Oilers' Community Foundation.

== Career statistics ==
=== Regular season and playoffs ===
			Regular season					Playoffs
Season	Team	League	GP	G	A	Pts	PIM	GP	G	A	Pts	PIM
2019–20	Colgate University	ECAC	38	10	22	32	24	—	—	—	—	—
2020–21	Colgate University	ECAC	23	9	12	21	17	—	—	—	—	—
2021–22	Colgate University	ECAC	39	15	38	53	24	—	—	—	—	—
2022–23	Colgate University	ECAC	40	25	46	71	14	—	—	—	—	—
2023–24	Colgate University	ECAC	40	22	39	61	14	—	—	—	—	—
2024–25	Ottawa Charge	PWHL	30	2	6	8	18	8	0	2	2	2
2025–26	Seattle Torrent	PWHL	30	7	9	16	8	—	—	—	—	—
PWHL totals			60	9	15	24	26	8	0	2	2	2

=== International ===
Year	Team	Event	Result	GP	G	A	Pts	PIM
2019	Canada	U18	1st place, gold medalist(s)	5	3	1	4	6
2023	Canada	WC	2nd place, silver medalist(s)	7	0	1	1	2
2024	Canada	WC	1st place, gold medalist(s)	7	2	2	4	4
2025	Canada	WC	2nd place, silver medalist(s)	6	2	2	4	0
Junior totals				5	3	1	4	6
Senior totals				20	4	5	9	6

== Awards and honours ==
Honours	Year
College
ECAC All-Rookie Team	2020
ECAC Player of the Year	2021
ECAC Forward of the Year	2021
ECAC All-First Team	2021
CCM/AHCA First Team All-American	2021
All-USCHO.com First Team	2021
ECAC All-Second Team	2022
ECAC Player of the Year	2023
ECAC Forward of the Year	2023
CCM/AHCA First Team All-American	2023
Wayne Dean Sportsmanship Award	2023
ECAC All-First Team	2024
CCM/AHCA Second Team All-American	2024

Awards and achievements
Preceded by Inaugural	Wayne Dean Sportsmanship Award; 2022–23	Succeeded by Ben Tupker
