= Kris Sparre =

Canadian-German ice hockey player

- Born: January 12, 1987 (age 39) Mississauga, Ontario, Canada
- Height: 5 ft 10 in (178 cm)
- Weight: 185 lb (84 kg; 13 st 3 lb)
- Position: Left wing
- Shot: Left
- Played for: Iserlohn Roosters; ERC Ingolstadt; Eisbären Berlin; Düsseldorfer EG
- NHL draft: Undrafted
- Playing career: 2008–2016

Kris Sparre (born January 12, 1987) is a Canadian-German retired professional ice hockey player. He is the inaugural head coach for the Hamilton Havoc of the Professional Women's Hockey League (PWHL). He is also the assistant coach of the Canadian national women's ice hockey team.

== Playing career ==
Sparre played major junior hockey with the Barrie Colts and Mississauga St. Michael's Majors in the Ontario Hockey League before joining the Columbia Inferno of the ECHL towards the end of the 2007-08 ECHL season. He then spent a season with the Idaho Steelheads, playing 56 regular season games and scoring 16 goals. In 2009, Sparre moved to Germany and signed for the Iserlohn Roosters of the Deutsche Eishockey Liga. He would also play for ERC Ingolstadt, Eisbären Berlin and Düsseldorfer EG, as well as stints in DEL2 with Dresdner Eislöwen and Löwen Frankfurt before retiring in 2016.

== Coaching career ==
Sparre served as an assistant coach for the San Diego Gulls of the American Hockey League (AHL) for three seasons.

On July 23, 2025, Sparre was named the head coach for the Boston Fleet of the PWHL.

On May 27, 2026, he was named the head coach for the Hamilton Havoc expansion team.

On September 24, 2026, he was named assistant coach of the Canadian national women's ice hockey team for the 2026-27 season.

== Career statistics ==
			Regular season					Playoffs
Season	Team	League	GP	G	A	Pts	PIM	GP	G	A	Pts	PIM
2003–04	Brampton Capitals	OPJHL	17	2	4	6	6	—	—	—	—	—
2004–05	Mississauga Chargers	OPJHL	48	13	25	38	14	—	—	—	—	—
2005–06	Mississauga Chargers	OPJHL	9	3	3	6	22	—	—	—	—	—
2005–06	Couchiching Terriers	OPJHL	9	1	4	5	2	—	—	—	—	—
2005–06	Halifax Mooseheads	QMJHL	1	0	0	0	2	—	—	—	—	—
2005–06	Barrie Colts	OHL	23	1	3	4	6	—	—	—	—	—
2006–07	Barrie Colts	OHL	68	29	22	51	34	8	1	1	2	6
2007–08	Barrie Colts	OHL	3	0	2	2	2	—	—	—	—	—
2007–08	Mississauga St. Michael's Majors	OHL	56	22	13	35	33	—	—	—	—	—
2007–08	Columbia Inferno	ECHL	9	1	3	4	10	—	—	—	—	—
2008–09	Idaho Steelheads	ECHL	56	16	19	35	95	—	—	—	—	—
2009–10	Iserlohn Roosters	DEL	55	5	1	6	46	—	—	—	—	—
2010–11	Iserlohn Roosters	DEL	37	4	7	11	24	—	—	—	—	—
2011–12	ERC Ingolstadt	DEL	52	11	18	29	59	9	0	3	3	2
2012–13	ERC Ingolstadt	DEL	45	5	9	14	24	6	0	0	0	6
2013–14	Eisbären Berlin	DEL	50	2	5	7	26	—	—	—	—	—
2014–15	Dresdner Eislöwen	DEL2	30	16	36	52	22	—	—	—	—	—
2014–15	Dusseldorf EG	DEL	18	5	3	8	8	11	1	0	1	10
2015–16	Frankfurt Lions	DEL2	33	17	24	41	38	4	1	2	3	6
DEL totals			257	32	43	75	187	29	1	3	4	18
