= Greg Fargo =

Canadian ice hockey coach (born 1983)

- Fargo in 2026

Current position
- Title: Head coach
- Team: New York Sirens
- Record: 0–0-0

Biographical details
- Born: May 21, 1983 (age 43); Kingston, Ontario, Canada
- Education: Elmira College

Playing career
- 2002–2006: Elmira College

Coaching career (HC unless noted)
- 2006–2008: Canisius College (Assistant)
- 2008–2012: Elmira College
- 2012–2024: Colgate
- 2024–present: New York Sirens

Head coaching record
- Overall: 340–170–40

Accomplishments and honors

Awards
- ECAC West Co-Coach of the Year (2009); AHCA Coach of the Year (2018); ECAC Hockey Coach of the Year (2021)

Greg Fargo (born May 21, 1983) is a Canadian ice hockey coach and former goaltender. He is the current head coach for the New York Sirens of the Professional Women's Hockey League (PWHL). He previously served as the head coach for Elmira College and Colgate's women's ice hockey teams.

== Playing career ==
Fargo played college ice hockey at Elmira College where he posted a 45–29–9 record in 88 games for the Soaring Eagles. During his senior season, he recorded the lowest goals against average (2.04) and highest save percentage (.926) in program history. The Soaring Eagles won the ECAC West tournament and Fargo was named the tournament Most Outstanding Player. They advanced to the Final Four of the 2006 NCAA Division III men's ice hockey tournament. He also became the school's leader in career saves (2,565) and minutes played (5,122:53).

== Coaching career ==
=== Elmira College ===
On June 6, 2008, Fargo was named head coach for his alma-mater, the Elmira College women's hockey team. He served as the head coach for four years, where he led the Soaring Eagles to an 85–23–5 record. During his first season at Elmira during the 2008–09 season, he led the team to an NCAA Division III women's ice hockey best 25 wins, ECAC West tournament championship, and a runner-up finish at the NCAA Division III women's ice hockey tournament. Following an outstanding season he was named ECAC West Co-Coach of the Year. During the 2009–10 season, he led the team to a second consecutive tournament championship, and a third-place finish at the NCAA Division III women's ice hockey tournament.

=== Colgate University ===
On May 14, 2012, Fargo was named the head coach of Colgate Raiders women's ice hockey team. During the 2017–18 season, Fargo led the Raiders to a program best record of 34–6–1, their first ECAC Hockey regular season title, and the NCAA women's ice hockey tournament for the first time in program history. During the 2018 NCAA National Collegiate women's ice hockey tournament, Colgate lost the championship game to Clarkson 1–2 in overtime. Following an outstanding season, Fargo was named the AHCA Coach of the Year.

During the 2020–21 season, he led the Raiders to a 15–7–1 record, and their first ECAC Hockey tournament championship in program history. Following the season, Fargo was named the ECAC Hockey Coach of the Year. On December 13, 2021, Fargo signed a contract extension at Colgate through the 2028 season. During the 2021–22 season, he led the Raiders to a 30–8–1 record, and their second consecutive ECAC Hockey tournament championship. During the 2022–23 season, he led the Raiders to a 32–5–2 record, and their third consecutive ECAC Hockey tournament championship.

During his 12-year tenure, Fargo led the Raiders to seven 20-win seasons, five NCAA tournament berths, four ECAC Hockey championships, three regional finals, and two Frozen Fours including a national championship appearance in 2017–18. He finished his career at Colgate with a 255–147–34 record, the highest winning percentage and winningest coach in program history.

=== New York Sirens ===
On June 7, 2024, Fargo was named head coach of PWHL New York, who were soon after renamed as the New York Sirens.

=== Team Canada ===
On June 23, 2015, Fargo was named an assistant coach for Canada at the 2016 IIHF World Women's U18 Championship, where they won a silver medal.

== Head coaching record ==
Record table
Season	Team	Overall	Conference	Standing	Postseason
Elmira College (ECAC West) (2008–2012)
2008–09	Elmira	25–5–1	16–1–1	1st	NCAA Runner-up
2009–10	Elmira	24–5–1	15–2–1	2nd	NCAA Third place
2010–11	Elmira	16–8–2	12–4–2	3rd	
2011–12	Elmira	20–5–1	15–3–0	3rd	
Elmira:		85–23–5	58–10–4		
Colgate University (ECAC Hockey) (2012–2024)
2012–13	Colgate	11–21–3	6–13–3	8th	
2013–14	Colgate	10–22–2	7–15–0	9th	
2014–15	Colgate	7–25–2	4–16–2	10th	
2015–16	Colgate	22–9–7	12–5–5	4th	
2016–17	Colgate	22–11–3	13–8–1	6th	
2017–18	Colgate	34–6–1	19–3–0	T-1st	NCAA Runner-up
2018–19	Colgate	23–10–5	15–4–3	T-2nd	
2019–20	Colgate	17–15–7	11–8–3	6th	
2020–21	Colgate	15–7–1	8–4–0	1st	NCAA Quarterfinals
2021–22	Colgate	30–8–1	16–5–1	3rd	NCAA Quarterfinals
2022–23	Colgate	32–6–2	18–3–1	2nd	NCAA Quarterfinals
2023–24	Colgate	32–7–1	18–4–0	1st	NCAA Semifinals
Colgate:		255–147–34	147–88–19		
Total:		340–170–40			
National champion Postseason invitational champion Conference regular season champion Conference regular season and conference tournament champion Division regular season champion Division regular season and conference tournament champion Conference tournament champion

== See also ==
- List of college women's ice hockey career coaching wins leaders
