= Sydney Bard =

American ice hockey player (born 2001)

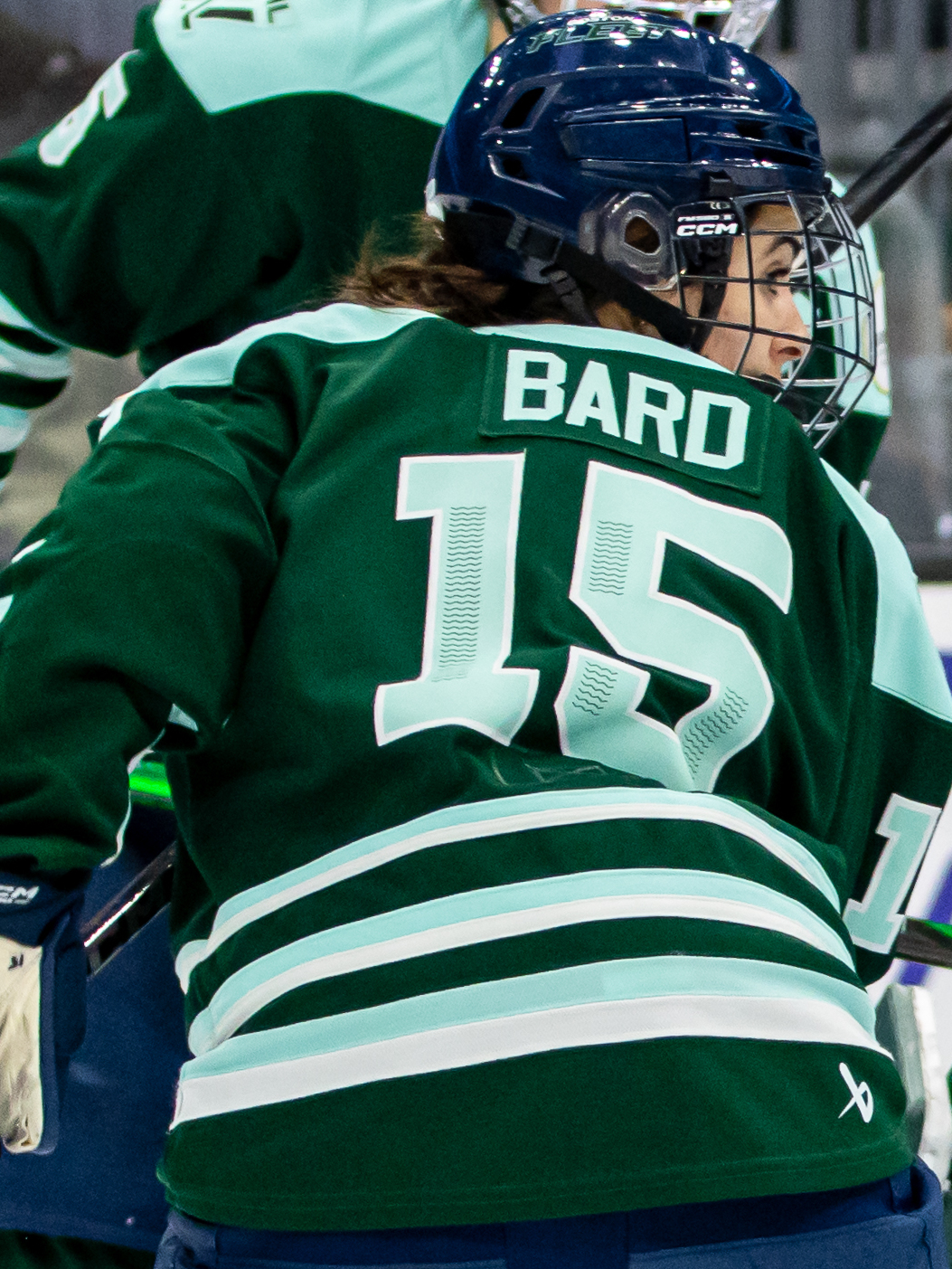
- Bard with the Boston Fleet in 2025
- Born: January 15, 2001 (age 25) New Hartford, New York, U.S.
- Height: 5 ft 3 in (160 cm)
- Position: Defence
- Shoots: Right
- PWHL team Former teams: Detroit Clutch; Boston Fleet; Vancouver Goldeneyes
- Playing career: 2017–present

Sydney Marie Bard (born January 15, 2001) is an American professional ice hockey defenceman for the Detroit Clutch in the Professional Women's Hockey League (PWHL). She previously played for the Vancouver Goldeneyes and the Boston Fleet of the PWHL. She played college ice hockey at Colgate.

== Early life ==
Bard attended New Hartford High School in New Hartford, New York, where she played field hockey, golf and lacrosse. At 15 years old she moved to Rochester, New York, to play hockey at Selects Academy. She won two state championships and was twice named Most Valuable Player while playing as a forward. She then played hockey for the Toronto Jr. Aeros of the Provincial Women's Hockey League during her senior year.

== Playing career ==
=== College ===
Bard began her collegiate hockey career with the Colgate Raiders during the 2019–20 season. During her freshman year, she recorded three goals and 13 assists in 38 games. She led all ECAC rookie defenseman with 16 points. Following the season she was named to the ECAC All-Rookie team. During the 2020–21 season in her sophomore year, she recorded one goal and seven assists in 23 games, in a season that was shortened due to the COVID-19 pandemic.

During the 2021–22 season, in her junior year, she recorded four goals and 23 assists in 39 games. She led all ECAC defenders in points and assists. Following the season she was named to the All-ECAC third team. During the 2022–23 season, in her senior year, she recorded three goals and 30 assists in 40 games. Following the season she was named to the All-ECAC first team. During the 2023–24 season, as a graduate student, she recorded two goals and 26 assists in 40 games. On January 20, 2024, she recorded her 100th career point.

Bard finished her collegiate career as Colgate’s all-time leader in points by a defenseman with 112.

=== Professional ===
On June 10, 2024, Bard was drafted in the fourth round, 22nd overall, by PWHL Boston in the 2024 PWHL Draft. On July 8, 2024, she signed a two-year contract with Boston. Bard scored her first goal in the PWHL on December 8, 2024, recording a total of one goal and two assists in her rookie year.

On June 9, 2025, Bard was drafted 13th overall by the Vancouver Goldeneyes in the 2025 PWHL Expansion Draft. During the 2025–26 season she recorded two assists in 30 games.

During the league's expansion to 12 teams ahead of the 2026–27 season, she signed a two-year contract with the Detroit Clutch on June 10, 2026.

== International play ==
Medal record

Representing United States

Ice hockey

World U18 Championships
| Silver medal – second place | 2019 Japan | |

Bard represented the United States at the 2019 IIHF World Women's U18 Championship and recorded one assist in five games and won a silver medal.

== Personal life ==
Bard was born to David and Dawn Bard. She has two brothers, Derek, and Alec, who are both golfers. She is a member of the LGBTQ community.

== Career statistics ==
=== Regular season and playoffs ===
| | | | Regular season | | | | | Playoffs |
| Season | Team | League | GP | G | A | Pts | PIM | GP | G | A | Pts | PIM |
|---|---|---|---|---|---|---|---|---|---|---|---|---|
| 2019–20 | Colgate University | ECAC | 38 | 3 | 13 | 16 | 20 | — | — | — | — | — |
| 2020–21 | Colgate University | ECAC | 23 | 1 | 7 | 8 | 12 | — | — | — | — | — |
| 2021–22 | Colgate University | ECAC | 39 | 4 | 23 | 27 | 18 | — | — | — | — | — |
| 2022–23 | Colgate University | ECAC | 40 | 3 | 30 | 33 | 26 | — | — | — | — | — |
| 2023–24 | Colgate University | ECAC | 40 | 2 | 26 | 28 | 20 | — | — | — | — | — |
| 2024–25 | Boston Fleet | PWHL | 27 | 1 | 2 | 3 | 14 | — | — | — | — | — |
| 2025–26 | Vancouver Goldeneyes | PWHL | 30 | 0 | 2 | 2 | 0 | — | — | — | — | — |
| PWHL totals | | | 57 | 1 | 4 | 5 | 14 | — | — | — | — | — |

=== International ===
| Year | Team | Event | Result | GP | G | A | Pts | PIM |
|---|---|---|---|---|---|---|---|---|
| 2019 | United States | U18 | 2nd place, silver medalist(s) | 5 | 0 | 1 | 1 | 6 |
| Junior totals | | | | 5 | 0 | 1 | 1 | 6 |

== Awards and honours ==
| Honours | Year |
College
| ECAC All-Rookie Team | 2020 |
| ECAC All-Third Team | 2022 |
| ECAC All-First Team | 2023 |
