= Jenna Goodwin =

- Born: June 1, 2003 (age 23) Sherwood Park, Alberta, Canada
- Height: 5 ft 5 in (165 cm)
- Position: Forward
- Shoots: Left
- PWHL team Former teams: Boston Fleet; Frölunda HC
- Playing career: 2026–present

Jenna Goodwin (born June 1, 2003) is a professional ice hockey forward for the Boston Fleet of the Professional Women's Hockey League (PWHL). She previously played for Frölunda HC of the Swedish Women's Hockey League (SDHL). She played college ice hockey at Clarkson.

== Playing career ==
With the St. Albert Slash, Goodwin won the 2019 Esso Cup at the Canadian Under-18 National Women's Club Championship.

=== College ===
During the 2023-24 season, Goodwin played in 40 games, amassing 21 points. In addition, she won 352 faceoffs. The following season, 2024-25, Goodwin also recorded 21 points, achieving a career high 13 goals.

=== Professional ===
After graduating from Clarkson, Goodwin spent the 2025-26 season skating for Frölunda HC (women) in the Swedish Women's Hockey League (SDHL).

On June 17, 2026, Goodwin was selected fifty-eighth overall in the 2026 PWHL Draft.

== Awards and honors ==
- AHCA/Krampade Academic All-America (2023-24)
- 2019 Esso Cup champion
