= Maeve Kelly (ice hockey) =

- Born: March 27, 2004 (age 22) Victoria, Minnesota
- Height: 5 ft 9 in (175 cm)
- Position: Defense
- Shoots: Right
- PWHL team: Boston Fleet
- Playing career: 2026–present

Maeve Kelly (born March 27, 2004) is a professional ice hockey forward drafted by the Boston Fleet of the Professional Women's Hockey League. She played her college ice hockey with Boston University.

== Playing career ==
=== College ===
Kelly scored her first collegiate goal on October 25, 2024 versus the Syracuse Orange.

During the 2025-26 season, Kelly served as the Terriers alternate team captain. She recorded nine points, appearing in 35 games.

=== Professional ===
On June 17, 2026, Kelly was selected seventieth overall in the 2026 PWHL Draft.

== Awards and honors ==
- 2025 Hockey East Tournament Champion
