= Jaden Bogden =

Canadian ice hockey player (born 2002)

- Born: July 16, 2002 (age 23) Edmonton, Alberta, Canada
- Height: 5 ft 10 in (178 cm)
- Position: Forward
- Shoots: Right
- PWHL team: Boston Fleet
- Playing career: 2020–present

Jaden Bogden (born July 16, 2002) is a Canadian professional ice hockey forward for the Boston Fleet of the Professional Women's Hockey League (PWHL). She played college ice hockey at Clarkson and Northeastern.

== Playing career ==
=== College ===
Bogden began her college ice hockey career for Clarkson during the 2020–21 season. She recorded 10 goals and nine assists in 96 games for Clarkson.

On May 14, 2024, she transferred to Northeastern. During the 2024–25 season, she recorded a career-high six goals and 16 assists in 35 games. During the 2025–26 season, she recorded seven goals and seven assists in 32 games.

=== Professional ===
On June 17, 2026, Bogden was drafted in the fourth round, 46th overall, by the Boston Fleet in the 2026 PWHL Draft.

== Personal life ==
Bogden was born to Julie and Shane Bogden, and has a sister, Megan, and a brother, Kaden.

== Career statistics ==
			Regular season					Playoffs
Season	Team	League	GP	G	A	Pts	PIM	GP	G	A	Pts	PIM
2020–21	Clarkson University	ECAC	18	0	0	0	2	—	—	—	—	—
2021–22	Clarkson University	ECAC	2	0	0	0	0	—	—	—	—	—
2022–23	Clarkson University	ECAC	39	4	3	7	26	—	—	—	—	—
2023–24	Clarkson University	ECAC	40	6	6	12	24	—	—	—	—	—
2024–25	Northeastern University	Hockey East	35	6	16	22	14	—	—	—	—	—
2025–26	Northeastern University	Hockey East	32	7	7	14	38	—	—	—	—	—
NCAA totals			166	23	32	55	104	—	—	—	—	—
