= Boston Fleet =

PWHL ice hockey team in Boston

- City: Boston, Massachusetts
- League: PWHL
- Conference: Eastern
- Founded: 2023
- Home arena: Agganis Arena
- Colors: Forest green, aqua, navy, teal
- Owner: Mark Walter Group
- General manager: Danielle Marmer
- Head coach: François Méthot
- Captain: Megan Keller
- Website: boston.thepwhl.com

Championships
- Regular season titles: 0
- Walter Cups: 0

The Boston Fleet are a professional ice hockey team based in Boston that competes in the Professional Women's Hockey League (PWHL). They are one of the six charter franchises of the league. The team plays its home games at Agganis Arena.

== History ==
=== Founding and inaugural season ===
On August 29, 2023, it was announced that one of the PWHL's first six franchises would be located in Boston. This ensured the continuation of professional women's hockey in the area after the folding of the Boston Pride and the Premier Hockey Federation earlier that summer; the Pride had been that league's most successful franchise, winning three Isobel Cup championships. Danielle Marmer, a former scout and player development assistant for the National Hockey League's Boston Bruins, was named PWHL Boston's inaugural general manager. On September 15, Boston University women's team associate head coach Courtney Birchard-Kessel was announced as the team's first head coach.

The team's first three player signings were United States national team players Hilary Knight, Aerin Frankel, and Megan Keller, all signed to three-year deals. Boston's first selection in the 2023 PWHL Draft, held on September 18, was Swiss forward Alina Müller, taken third overall.

In November, it was revealed that the team's colors would be green, gray, and white. It was also revealed that the team would host home games at the Tsongas Center in Lowell.

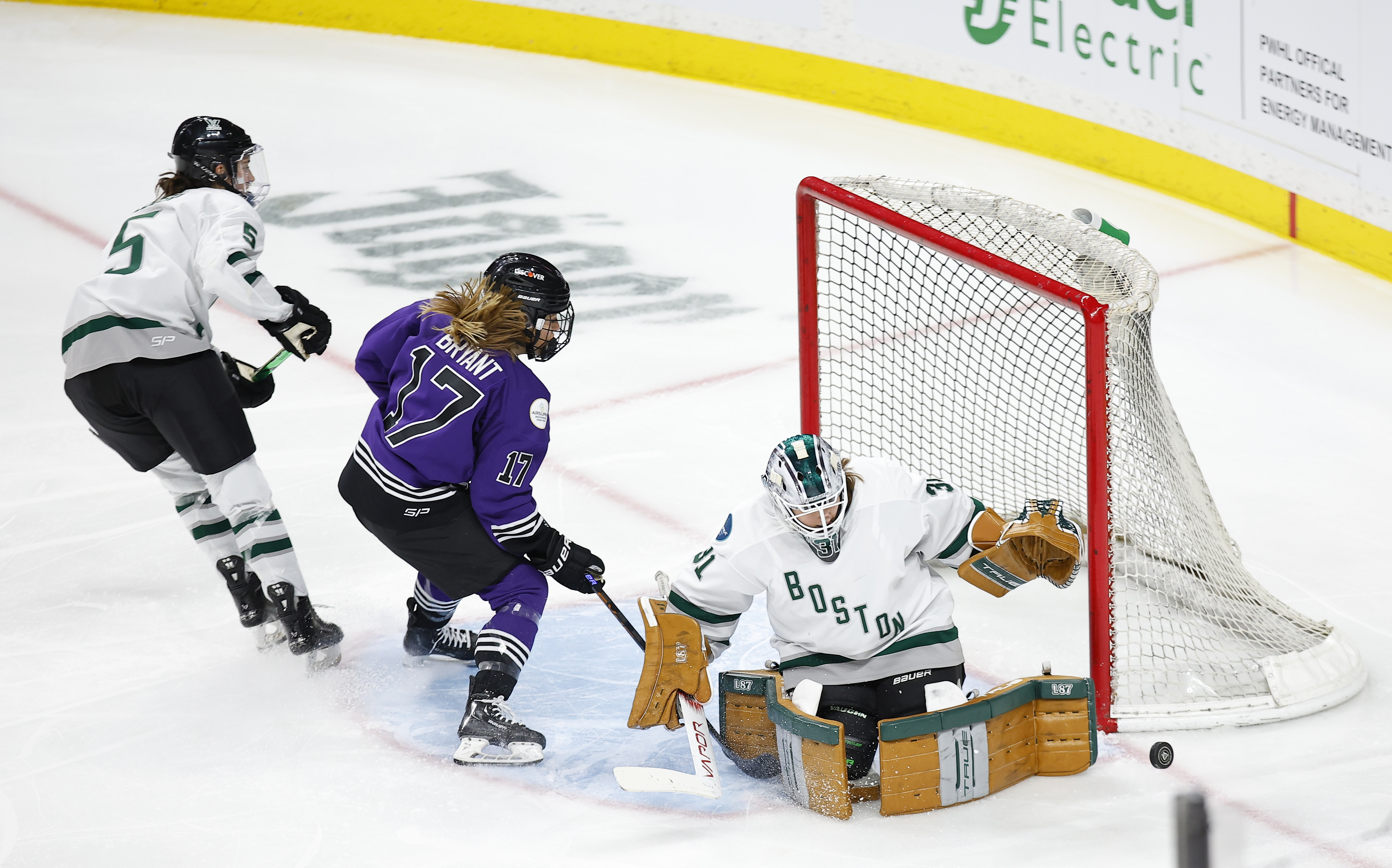
Boston's Aerin Frankel makes a save in 2024.

Ahead of the start of the inaugural 2024 season, former Boston Bruins captain Patrice Bergeron introduced Knight as Boston's captain; Keller and Jamie Lee Rattray were introduced as alternate captains. The team hosted its inaugural game against Minnesota Frost on January 3, 2024. The team's first ever goal was scored by Theresa Schafzahl, 7:59 into the 2nd period. Minnesota ultimately won the game by a score of 3–2. Boston's first victory came in a 3–2 overtime decision against Montreal Victoire on January 13. Boston went on to finish third in the league standings, clinching a playoff spot in their final regular season game.

In the first round of the playoffs, Boston faced Montreal Victoire. Boston went on to defeat Montreal in three straight games, with all three victories coming in overtime. Boston advanced to the championship series, where they faced Minnesota Frost. Goaltender Aerin Frankel led the playoffs in saves. However, Boston lost a close five-game series, with Minnesota clinching the Walter Cup championship in Lowell on May 29.

On June 23, 2025, Birchard-Kessel left the Fleet and was named the head coach for the Princeton Tigers women's ice hockey team. On July 23, 2025, Kris Sparre was named the second head coach in program history.

Ahead of the 2025–26 season, the Boston Fleet announced that three additional coaches would be joining the team. Jordan Smotherman, former head coach of HC TWK Innsbruck, general manager/head coach of the Worcester Railers in the ECHL, and player joined as assistant coach, Derek Whitmore, former assistant coach of the Chicago Steel in the United States Hockey League joined as player development coach, and Former professional ice hockey player and Olympian, Kacey Bellamy joined as player development consultant.

On May 27, 2026, Kris Sparre left the Fleet and was named the head coach for the Hamilton Havoc. Subsequently, François Méthot was named the third head coach in team history on June 4, 2026. Méthot was previously the General Manager and Head Coach of the Rochester Jr. Americans in the North American Hockey League (NAHL).

In July 2026 the Fleet announced that Agganis Arena in Boston will be their primary home venue for the 2026–2027 season.

== Season-by-season record ==
Key of colors and symbols
Color/symbol	Explanation
†	Indicates League Championship
*	Indicates regular Championship

Year by year results
Season	GP	RW	OW	OL	RL	Pts	GF	GA	GD	Finish	Playoffs
2023–24	24	8	4	3	9	35	50	57	−7	3rd	Lost Walter Cup Finals, 2–3 (PWHL Minnesota)
2024–25	30	9	6	5	10	44	75	76	−1	5th	Did not qualify
2025–26	30	16	5	4	5	62	74	45	+29	2nd	Lost Semifinal, 1–3 (Ottawa Charge)

== Team identity ==
Inaugural season logo for PWHL Boston

Boston operated without unique branding for the league's inaugural season, like all charter franchises. The team was known as PWHL Boston and wore a league-wide jersey template that featured the city's name diagonally on the front. The team did have its own color scheme, featuring green and black. In October 2023, the league registered a trademark for the name "Boston Wicked", which proved unpopular with fans when leaked. In September 2024, the team was instead given the name "Fleet", in reference to Boston's maritime tradition; the team's logo features a stylized letter 'B' doubling as an anchor. The team retained its color scheme, adding additional shades of green. The Hockey News reported that other names in contention for Boston, before settling on Fleet, included Emeralds and Blitz.

== Players and personnel ==
=== Current roster ===
As of August 2, 2026

No.	Nat	Player	Pos	S/G	Age	Acquired	Birthplace
74	(Canada)	Jaden Bogden	F	R	24	2026	Edmonton, Alberta
28	(United States)	Amanda Boulier	D	R	33	2026	Watertown, Connecticut
4	(United States)	Grace Dwyer	D	L	22	2026	Wynnewood, Pennsylvania
31	(United States)	Aerin Frankel	G	L	27	2023	Chappaqua, New York
36	(Canada)	Loren Gabel	F	L	29	2023	Kitchener, Ontario
12	(Canada)	Jenna Goodwin	F	L	23	2026	Sherwood Park, Alberta
22	(United States)	Taylor House	F	L	28	2026	Joliet, Illinois
26	(United States)	Ella Huber	F	L	23	2025	Northfield, Illinois
5	(United States)	Megan Keller (C)	D	L	30	2023	Farmington, Michigan
24	(United States)	Maeve Kelly	D	R	22	2026	Victoria, Minnesota
25	(Germany)	Laura Kluge	F	L	30	2025	Berlin, Germany
53	(Canada)	Rylind MacKinnon	D	L	26	2025	Cranbrook, British Columbia
27	(United States)	Shay Maloney	F	R	27	2024	McHenry, Illinois
15	(United States)	Olivia Mobley	C	R	25	2025	St. Louis Park, Minnesota
19	(Canada)	Abby Newhook	C	R	23	2025	St. John's, Newfoundland and Labrador
44	(Canada)	Jill Saulnier	F	L	34	2025	Halifax, Nova Scotia
13	(United States)	Liz Schepers	F	L	27	2025	Mound, Minnesota
9	(Canada)	Sophie Shirley	F	R	27	2023	Saskatoon, Saskatchewan
10	(United States)	Leah Stecker	D	R	22	2026	Randolph, New Jersey
77	(Finland)	Susanna Tapani	F	L	33	2024	Laitila, Finland
30	(United States)	Amanda Thiele	G	L	24	2025	Milford, Michigan
8	(United States)	Haley Winn	D	R	23	2025	Rochester, New York

=== Reserves ===
As of July 8, 2026

No.	Nat	Player	Pos	S/G	Age	Acquired	Birthplace
73	(United States)	Olivia Zafuto	D	L	29	2024	Niagara Falls, New York

=== Team captains ===
- Hilary Knight, 2023–2025
- Megan Keller, 2025–present

=== Head coaches ===
- Courtney Birchard-Kessel, 2023–2025
- Kris Sparre, 2025–2026
- François Méthot, 2026–present

=== Coaching staff ===
- Stefanie McKeough, 2023–present
- Jordan Smotherman, 2025–present
- Lenny Mosca (goaltending coach), 2024–present
- Shawn Roche (video coach), 2024–present
- Derek Whitmore (player development coach), 2025–present
- Kacey Bellamy (player development consultant), 2025–present

=== First-round draft picks ===
- 2023: Alina Müller (3rd overall)
- 2024: Hannah Bilka (4th overall)
- 2025: Haley Winn (2nd overall)
- 2026: Grace Dwyer (10th overall)

== Awards and honors ==
- Hilary Knight – 2024–25 PWHL Scoring Champion (tied with Sarah Fillier)
- Aerin Frankel – 2025–26 Billy Jean King Most Valuable Player
- Aerin Frankel – 2025–26 PWHL Goaltender of the Year
- Megan Keller – 2025–26 PWHL Defender of the Year
- Haley Winn – 2025–26 PWHL Rookie of the Year
- Kris Sparre – 2025–26 PWHL Coach of the Year

== Schedule ==
The Boston Fleet's 2025–26 schedule was released on October 1, 2025. The schedule includes several notable changes from the previous season, including the increased number of home games to be played at Agganis Arena, reflecting the team's effort to expand their presence in the city. The updated schedule includes a mix of long-standing rivalries as well as new matchups. Boston Fleet General Manager, Danielle Marmer, stated "There isn't a single opponent we can afford to overlook this season. The competitive balance in this league is incredible, and now with the addition of Seattle Torrent and Vancouver Goldeneyes the intensity and competitiveness are only going to rise. We know we'll need to bring our best effort every night and find a way to play consistent hockey throughout the season." A full list of dates, opponents, and locations can be found on the 2025–26 Boston Fleet season page.

== Partnerships and sponsors ==
The Boston Fleet has accumulated many sponsors and partners over the past two years. The founding partner of the PWHL is Scotia Bank, which extends to the Boston Fleet as well as the other teams in the league. The team also has their own exclusive sponsors, with Sullivan Tire and Auto Service announcing their official partnership on November 21, 2025. The general manager of the Boston Fleet, Danielle Marmer, put out a statement saying, "Partnering with a respected local company like Sullivan Tire is a meaningful step for our organization. Their commitment to the community aligns with how we want to represent this city, and we’re looking forward to working together this season." The Fleet Pro Series, presented by Sullivan Tire, was set to begin in December 2025.

== Community work ==
The Boston fleet's Fleet Pro Series program offers youth and girls' hockey organizations opportunity to host a 50‑minute on‑ice practice, led by professional Fleet players, and followed by a 20‑minute photo and autograph session.

The Fleet also hosts an array of unity, theme and giveaway games; supporting causes like Black History, Boston Strong, Mental Health Awareness and Pride. Additionally the team will host a Kids & Youth hockey game on March 21, 2026.

Another way the team gives back is through the Boston Fleet website, where organizations are able to submit donation requests. "The Boston Fleet are excited to support organizations in our community that are making a positive impact. Donations are a meaningful way for us to give back and help create change. If you're seeking support, we welcome your request!"
