= Colgate Raiders women's ice hockey =

- University: Colgate University
- Conference: ECAC
- Head coach: Stefan Decosse; 3rd season
- Arena: Class of 1965 Arena; Hamilton, New York
- Colors: Maroon and white

NCAA tournament runner-up
- 2018

NCAA tournament Frozen Four
- 2018, 2024

NCAA tournament appearances
- 2018, 2021, 2022, 2023, 2024, 2025

Conference tournament champions
- 2021, 2022, 2023, 2024

Conference regular season champions
- 2018, 2021, 2024

The Colgate Raiders women's ice hockey is the team that is an NCAA Division I ice hockey team that represents Colgate University and play in ECAC Hockey. The Raiders play their home games at Class of 1965 Arena. The Raiders have played in Division I hockey since the 2001–02 season after playing at the NCAA Division III from 1997 to 2001.

== History ==
=== 1973–1983: The early years ===
From 1973 to 1974, Colgate Women's hockey started as an intramural team. Despite interest from the players in making the team varsity, the Athletic Director said the team would require "sustained interest." In 1974, Colgate Women's Hockey became club team. For the players from 1974 to 1983, 57% had never played on a team before Colgate women's hockey. 92% had never played hockey before, and 62% started by playing on figure skates, using masking tape over the toe picks. Many pieces of equipment and uniforms were "hand me downs" from the men's team. Players had to purchase their own sticks, skates and jerseys. The women's team practiced when ice time was available, which was usually late, after intramural games were completed, usually at 10 p.m.. Damp, smelly pads would be passed from intramural players to the women – given a brief spray of sanitizer by the student intramural equipment minder during the transfer.

During these years, the team played other colleges up and down the east coast, including Cornell, St. Lawrence, Oswego and Ithaca. Whether checking would be allowed was determined before the game by the coaches. If a team didn't have pads for each suited player, there was no checking.

One memorable game in the early years included an 18–1 loss to Cornell, during which the Colgate goalie stopped 72 shots.

In the early years, players travelled to games in their own cars or used university vans, which they had to drive themselves. With no funding for transportation and accommodations, the players would often try to play near where some of the players lived and stayed at the player's family's house. For many games, players had to call around to find out who could make the game, what positions they could play and if they had a jersey.

Coaching the team was a volunteer job, and it was an unpaid and time-consuming one, so it was often difficult for the team to find coaches. One of Colgate women's hockey's first coaches was Mike Milbury.

=== Cook v. Colgate University ===
In 1993, the Colgate Women's Hockey Team was granted varsity status after a decision from the United States Court of Appeals, Second Circuit.

Colgate University appealed an original judgment entered in the United States District Court for the Northern District of New York, ordering it to elevate its women's club ice hockey team to varsity status and to provide equal funding and benefits to its men's and women's ice hockey programs. The plaintiffs were Jennifer Baldwin Cook, Melissa Ehlers, Christine Price, Thayer Jaques and Julie Wolff, who were all either current or former Colgate students and former members of Colgate's women's club ice hockey team. Frustrated by Colgate's continued reluctance to elevate the program to varsity status, the plaintiffs filed in court on April 10, 1990, alleging that Colgate's failure to provide a comparable ice hockey program to men and women students violated Title IX of the Education Amendments of 1972, 20 U.S.C. §§ 1681-1688 (1990), the regulations of the Department of Education, as well as the Fifth and Fourteenth Amendments to the Constitution. For its part, Colgate denied any discrimination and argued that its compliance with the mandates of Title IX should be measured by its overall athletic program, not by a sport-by-sport comparison. Ultimately, Cook et al., won the judgement.

=== 1997–2001 ===
Colgate women's hockey went varsity in 1997. The team was initially Division III but transitioned to Division I in 2001.

=== 2001–11 ===
In 2008-2009, Kimberly Sass set a school record for most wins in a season by a goaltender with 14 games. Sass finished the season as one of the top ranked goalies in the ECAC. Her .941 save percentage was first in the ECAC. Her 1.85 goals against average was sixth while her .656 win percentage was fourth. From October 7–8, 2011: In a pair of victories over the Lindenwood Lions, Brittany Phillips accumulated a total of 10 points. In the 7–2 victory on October 7, she notched two goals, while logging an assist. One of the goals was the game-winning goal.

The following day, she had seven points (two goals, five assists) in an 8–2 win. Of the four goals she scored, two were power play goals. Her seven points ranked second in program history for most points in one game. The five assists ranked second for most assists in one game. In addition, Melissa Kueber registered six points in the sweep. On October 8, she led the team with four goals scored in an 8–2 triumph over the Lions. She also notched an assist. The four tallies tied for first in program history for most scores in one game.

=== 2012–2024 ===
Greg Fargo began as head coach in the 2012–13 season. Prior to coaching at Colgate, he was head coach for the women's ice hockey team at Elmira, in NCAA Division III, for four seasons. Fargo played his college hockey career as a goaltender, at Elmira.

In 2015-2016, Colgate had its first 22 win season, setting a program record.

Colgate had its most successful year in program history during the 2017–18 season. The Raiders finished 34–6–1, setting a new program record for wins. They finished tied with Clarkson for first in the ECAC conference, with a 19–3 (.864) record, earning their first ECAC league title. They qualified for the NCAA tournament for the first time, and advanced to the championship game after beating Northeastern in the quarterfinals by a score of 3–1, and Wisconsin in the semi-finals in a 4–3 victory.

The championship game against conference rival Clarkson was a close contest. Clarkson scored first, at 16:29 in the opening period, on a goal by forward Cassidy Vinkle, assisted by Kelly Mariani. It was the only goal Colgate goalie Julia Vandyk allowed in regulation. Colgate tied the score at 2:27 in the second period, on an equalizer by Malia Schneider, her 16th of the season, with assists from Olivia Zafuto and Bre Wilson-Bennett. The teams went scoreless in the third period and ended regulation at 1–1. At 7:55 in the first overtime, Elizabeth Giguere scored the game-winner, to give Clarkson the national championship. Finishing as national runner-up, the season saw the highest finish for the Raiders in Colgate program history. Head coach Greg Fargo won the 2017–18 Division I AHCA Coach of the Year award, given by the American Hockey Coaches Association.

=== 2024–present ===
On July 9, 2024, former assistant coach Stefan Decosse was named the fifth head coach of Colgate, after former head coach Greg Fargo was named head of the New York Sirens of the Professional Women's Hockey League (PWHL).

=== Year by year ===
Won championship	Lost championship	Conference champions	League leader

Year	Coach	W	L	T	Conference	Conf. W	Conf. L	Conf. T	Finish	Conference Tournament	NCAA Tournament
2024–25	Stefan Decosse	30	9	0	ECAC	18	4	0	2nd ECAC	Won Quarterfinals vs. Princeton (5–2, 2–1); Won Semifinals vs. St. Lawrence (4–2); Lost Championship vs. Cornell (1–5)	Lost Quarterfinals vs. Minnesota (2–3)
2023–24	Greg Fargo	32	7	1	ECAC	18	4	0	1st ECAC	Won Quarterfinals vs. Brown (5–1, 5–1); Won Semifinals vs. Cornell (5–1); Won Championship vs. Clarkson (3–0)	Won Quarterfinals vs. Cornell (3–1); Lost Frozen Four vs. Wisconsin (1–3)
2022–23	Greg Fargo	32	6	2	ECAC	18	3	1	2nd ECAC	Won Quarterfinals vs. Princeton (2–3, 4–3, 2–1); Won Semifinals vs. Quinnipiac (5–1); Won Championship vs. Clarkson (8–2)	Lost Quarterfinals vs. Wisconsin (2–4)
2021–22	Greg Fargo	30	8	1	ECAC	16	5	1	3rd ECAC	Won Quarterfinals vs. Cornell (1–0 OT, 3–2); Won Semifinals vs. Quinnipiac (3–2); Won Championship vs. Yale (2–1 OT)	Lost Quarterfinals vs. Yale (1–2 OT)
2020–21	Greg Fargo	15	7	1	ECAC	10	4	0	1st ECAC	Won Semifinals vs. Quinnipiac (2–1); Won Championship vs. St. Lawrence (3–2)	Lost Quarterfinals vs. Minnesota-Duluth (0–1 OT)
2019–20	Greg Fargo	17	15	6	ECAC	11	8	3	6th ECAC	Lost Quarterfinals vs. Clarkson (0–1 OT, 0–2)	Did not qualify
2018–19	Greg Fargo	23	10	5	ECAC	15	4	3	2nd ECAC	Won Quarterfinals vs. Harvard (2–5, 4–2, 5–2); Lost Semifinals vs. Clarkson (0–2)	Did not qualify
2017–18	Greg Fargo	34	6	1	ECAC	19	3	0	Tied 1st ECAC	Won Quarterfinals vs. Harvard (6–4, 6–1); Won Semifinals vs. Cornell (5-4); Lost Championship vs. Clarkson (0-3)	Won Quarterfinals vs. Northeastern (3-1); Won Frozen Four vs. Wisconsin (4-3 2OT); Lost Championship vs. Clarkson (1-2 OT)
2016–17	Greg Fargo	22	11	3	ECAC	13	8	1	5th ECAC	Lost Quarterfinals vs. Cornell (1–2, 0–1)	Did not qualify
2015–16	Greg Fargo	22	9	7	ECAC	12	5	5	4th ECAC	Won Quarterfinals vs. Harvard (4–1, 1–4, 3–2 OT); Lost Semifinals vs. Clarkson (2–5)	Did not qualify
2014–15	Greg Fargo	7	25	2	ECAC	4	16	2	10th ECAC	Did not qualify	Did not qualify
2013–14	Greg Fargo	10	22	2	ECAC	7	15	0	Tied 9th ECAC	Did not qualify	Did not qualify
2012–13	Greg Fargo	11	21	3	ECAC	6	13	3	8th ECAC	Lost Quarterfinals vs. Cornell (4–5 OT, 2–3)	Did not qualify
2011–12	Scott Wiley	10	21	2	ECAC	5	15	2	10th ECAC	Did not qualify	Did not qualify
2010–11	Scott Wiley	11	19	3	ECAC	8	12	2	Tied 8th ECAC	Did not qualify	Did not qualify
2009–10	Scott Wiley	12	20	4	ECAC	8	10	4	8th ECAC	Lost Quarterfinals vs. Cornell (1–2, 0–5)	Did not qualify
2008–09	Scott Wiley	19	14	3	ECAC	12	7	3	5th ECAC	Lost Quarterfinals vs. Dartmouth (7–6 OT, 1–2, 3–7)	Did not qualify
2007–08	Scott Wiley	12	17	5	ECAC	9	9	4	6th ECAC	Lost Quarterfinals vs. Dartmouth (3–4, 2–4)	Did not qualify
2006–07	Scott Wiley	17	15	2	ECAC	14	7	1	5th ECAC	Won Quarterfinals vs. Princeton (1–0 OT, 3–2); Lost Semifinals vs. Dartmouth (1–4)	Did not qualify
2005–06	Scott Wiley	12	15	7	ECAC	9	8	3	Tied 6th ECAC	Lost Quarterfinals vs. Princeton (0–3, 4–5)	Did not qualify
2004–05	Scott Wiley	16	15	4	ECAC	9	7	4	7th ECAC	Lost Quarterfinals vs. Dartmouth (0–4, 2–3)	Did not qualify
2003–04	Scott Wiley	16	17	3	ECAC	6	11	1	7th ECAC	Lost Quarterfinals vs. St. Lawrence (1–5, 1–0, 1–7)	Did not qualify
2002–03	Scott Wiley	12	21	1	ECAC	4	11	1	7th ECAC	Lost Quarterfinals vs. Dartmouth (0–8, 2–8)	Did not qualify
2001–02	Ted Wisner	12	21	1	ECAC	2	12	2	8th ECAC	Lost Quarterfinals vs. Dartmouth (1–11, 0–6)	Did not qualify

== Roster ==
=== 2022–23 Raiders ===
As of September 6, 2022.

No.	Nat.	Player	Class	Pos	Height	DoB	Hometown	Previous team
2		Rachel Golnitz	Sophomore	D	5' 8" (1.73 m)	2002-09-06	Wyoming, Minnesota	Forest Lake Area High School
4		Tanner Gates	Senior	D	5' 6" (1.68 m)	2000-05-04	Oceanside, California	Anaheim Lady Ducks
5		Lauren Fraser	Sophomore	F	5' 6" (1.68 m)	2002-01-01	Andover, Massachusetts	The Governor's Academy
6		Gwen Eichfeld	Sophomore	D	5' 7" (1.7 m)	2002-09-04	Winnetka, Illinois	Shattuck-Saint Mary's
8		Elyssa Biederman	Freshman	F	5' 1" (1.55 m)	2004-07-14	Franklin, Michigan	Little Caesars
9		Danielle Serdachny (C)	Senior	F	5' 9" (1.75 m)	2001-05-12	Edmonton, Alberta	Pursuit of Excellence
10		Allyson Simpson (A)	Senior	D	5' 8" (1.73 m)	2000-12-20	Frisco, Texas	Shattuck-Saint Mary's
11		Sydney Bard (A)	Senior	D	5' 3" (1.6 m)	2001-01-15	New Hartford, New York	Toronto Jr. Aeros
12		Annaka Mettler	Sophomore	D	5' 11" (1.8 m)	2003-01-20	New Canaan, Connecticut	Taft School
14		Kas Betinol	Junior	F	5' 3" (1.6 m)	2001-06-14	Okotoks, Alberta	KRS Vanke Rays
15		Katie Chan	Sophomore	F	5' 2" (1.57 m)	2003-01-05	Richmond, British Columbia	Delta Hockey Academy
16		Kaitlyn O'Donohoe	Senior	F	5' 7" (1.7 m)	2001-09-20	Myrtle Beach, South Carolina	Choate Rosemary Hall
17		Neena Brick	Sophomore	F	5' 8" (1.73 m)	2003-11-20	Regina, Saskatchewan	Regina Rebels
18		Ava Svejkovsky	Freshman	D	5' 9" (1.75 m)	2004-07-26	Point Roberts, Washington	Delta Hockey Academy
19		Maggie MacEachern (A)	Senior	D	5' 6" (1.68 m)	2001-06-07	Brooklin, Ontario	Durham West Jr. Lightning
22		Sara Stewart	Freshman	F	5' 3" (1.6 m)	2004-08-07	Antigonish, Nova Scotia	Northern Selects
23		Tristana Tatur	Sophomore	F	5' 8" (1.73 m)	2003-02-03	Maple Grove, Minnesota	Maple Grove High School
30		Averill McCorkle	Sophomore	G	5' 6" (1.68 m)	2003-01-01	Salem, Massachusetts	The Governor's Academy
31		Kayle Osborne	Junior	G	5' 8" (1.73 m)	2002-02-28	Westport, Ontario	Ottawa Lady Senators
71		Tessa Holk	Freshman	F	5' 5" (1.65 m)	2004-06-01	Ancaster, Ontario	Stoney Creek Jr. Sabres
77		Dara Greig	Junior	F	5' 7" (1.7 m)	2000-12-30	Lethbridge, Alberta	University of Wisconsin
83		Hannah Murphy	Sophomore	G	5' 10" (1.78 m)	2003-08-03	Bradford, Ontario	Durham West Jr. Lightning
86		Jenna Duarte	Freshman	F	5' 6" (1.68 m)	2004-01-27	Hamilton, Ontario	Stoney Creek Jr. Sabres
91		Sarah Roger	Freshman	F	5' 8" (1.73 m)	2004-08-17	Brighton, Ontario	Kingston Jr. Ice Wolves
94		Sammy Smigliani	Senior	F	5' 8" (1.73 m)	2000-12-08	La Jolla, California	Belle Tire
98		Kristýna Kaltounková	Junior	F	5' 8" (1.73 m)	2002-04-14	Vlašim, Czech Republic	Vermont Academy

== Awards and honors ==
- Cheryl Setchell, Forward, 2002 ECAC North All-Rookie Team
- Kiira Dosdall, Canadian Women's Hockey League Draft, Boston Blades, 8th round, #40 overall (2013)
- Kiira Dosdall, Defense, 2009 Second Team All-ECAC
- Jessie Eldridge: Women’s Hockey Commissioners Association Player of the Month - February 2019
- Melissa Kueber, ECAC Rookie of the Week (Week of October 17, 2011)
- Rebecca Lahar, Goalie, 2002 ECAC North All-Rookie Team
- Brittany Phillips, ECAC Player of the Week (Week of October 17, 2011)
- Kimberly Sass, 2009 All-ECAC First Team (Sass was the first Raiders player to be named to the First Team)
- Kimberly Sass, ECAC All-Rookie Team
- Greg Fargo, 2018 AHCA Coach of the Year

=== All-America honors ===
- Danielle Serdachny, 2020–21 CCM/ACHA First-Team All-American

=== ECAC Awards ===
- Kimberly Sass: 2009 ECAC Goaltender of the Year
- Danielle Serdachny: 2021 ECAC Player of the Year
- Danielle Serdachny: 2021 ECAC Best Forward

==== ECAC Monthly Awards ====
- Jessie Eldridge: ECAC Player of the Month (December 2018)
- Jessie Eldridge: ECAC Player of the Month (February 2019)
- Kayle Osborne, ECAC Adirondack Health Rookie of the Month (January 2021)
- Kayle Osborne, ECAC MAC Goaltending Goalie of the Month (March 2021)
- Sammy Smigliani, ECAC Army ROTC Player of the Month (March 2021)

==== ECAC All-Rookie Team ====
- Sydney Bard, 2019–20 ECAC All-Rookie Team
- Danielle Serdachny, 2019–20 ECAC All-Rookie Team

=== Team awards ===
- Brad Houston Most Valuable Offensive Player

Year	Player
2017	Jessie Eldridge
2016	Megan Sullivan
2015	Melissa Kueber
2014	Taylor Volpe
2013	Brittany Phillips
2012	Jocelyn Simpson
2011	Brittany Phillips
2010	Katie Stewart
2007-2009	Sam Hunt
2006	Allison Paiano
2005	Amanda Barre
2004	Becky Irvine
2003	Allison Paiano
2002	Cheryl Setchell, Amanda Barre
2001	Heather Murphy
2000	Heather Murphy

- Most Valuable Defensive Player

Year	Player
2017	Cat Quirion
2016	Lauren Wildfang
2015	Ashlynne Rando
2014	Megan Wickens, Rachel Walsh
2013	Megan Wickens
2012	Kim Sass, Megan Wickens
2011	Amanda Kirwan
2010	Ali Edell
2007-2009	Kiira Dosdall
2006	Brooke Wheeler
2005, 2007	Tara French
2004	Rebecca Lahar
2003	Rebecca Lahar
2002	Chelsey Rhodes
2001	Kelly Roos
2000	Kelly Roos

- Most Improved Player

Year	Player
2017	Ellie DeCaprio
2016	Chelsea Jacques
2015	Hayla Hans
2014	Brittany Brooks
2013	Stephanie Giannopoulos
2012	Caroline Potoliccio
2011	Megan Wickens
2010	Jessica Hootz, Jenna Klynstra
2009	Amanda Kirwan
2008	Jacquie Colborne
2007	Evan Minnick
2006	Laura Jansen
2005	Brooke Wheeler
2004	Alix Warren
2003	Melanie Barclay
2002	Lori Marshall
2001	Kathryn Green, Nicole Lehrhoff, Kari Dequine
2000	Anne Stover, Toby Mandel
1999	Jennifer O'Brien
1998	Rebecca Balkin

- Rookie of the Year

Year	Player
2017	Livia Altmann
2016	Bailey Larson
2015	Breanne Wilson-Bennett
2014	Cat Quirion
2013	Ashlynne Rando
2012	Melissa Kueber
2011	Shannon Doyle
2010	Brittany Phillips
2009	Kimberly Sass
2008	Lisa Plenderleith
2007	Katie Stewart
2006	Sam Hunt
2005	Kara Leene
2004	Tara French
2003	Allison Paiano
2002	Cheryl Setchell
2001	Caitlin Hornyak, Avery McGlenn
2000	Jennifer Burtraw

- Sportsmanship Award

Year	Player
2017	Livia Atlmann
2016	Katelyn Parker
2015	Katelyn Parker
2014	Katelyn Parker
2013	Katelyn Parker
2012	Susan Allen
2011	Heidi Peterson
2010	Heidi Peterson
2009	Laura Jensen
2008	Kate Wolgemuth
2007	Carly McNaughton
2006	Carly McNaughton
2005	Cheryl Setchell
2004	Caitlin Hornyak
2003	Nicole Lehnhoff
2002	Toby Mandel
2001	Toby Mandel
2000	Charlotte Davet

- Marian Lefevre Coach's Award, previously the Interest, Attitude & Dedication award. Discontinued after 2015–2016 season

Year	Player
2016	Annika Zalewski
2015	Hannah Rastrick
2014	Rachel Walsh
2013	Jessica Hootz
2012	Heidi Peterson
2011	Kim Sass
2010	Beth Rotenberg
2009	Elayna Hamashuk
2008	Mallory Johnston
2007	Carly McNaughton, Ashley Bradford
2006	Melanie Barclay
2005	Maura Kehoe
2004	Avery McGlenn
2003	Nichole Lehnhoff, Toby Mandel
2002	Kelly Roos
2001	Abigail Webb
2000	Lindsay Barton
1999	Andrew Thomas
1998	Stephanie Sand, Stephanie Racette

- Don Palmateer Award, awarded by the Center Ice Club to the player whose leadership, inspiration and performance on the ice and off during her career has had the greatest impact on Colgate women's hockey.

Year	Player
2017	Cat Quirion
2016	Ashlynne Rando
2015	Class of 2015
2014	Megan Wickens
2013	Jenna Klynstra
2012	Kim Sass
2011	Jessi Waters
2010	Ali Edell
2009	Sam Hunt, Kiira Dosdall, Elin Brown
2008	Kate Wolgemuth
2007	Tara French
2006	Becky Irvine
2005	Cheryl Setchell
2004	Caitlyn Hornyak

== All-time scoring leaders ==
Name	Years	GP	G	A	PTS
Danielle Serdachny	2019–2024	180	81	157	238
Kristýna Kaltounková	2020–2025	171	111	122	233
Jessie Eldridge	2015–2019	153	74	89	163
Heather Murphy	1992–02	94	77	83	160
Sam Hunt	2006–2009	136	72	69	141
Allison Paiano	2003–2006	136	54	56	110
Brittany Phillips	2010–2013	135	57	51	108
Becky Irvine	2003–2006	133	48	59	107
Charlotte Davet	1998–2000	65	43	62	105
Katie Stewart	2007–2010	122	56	43	99
Amanda Barre	2002-2005	119	52	41	93
Elin Brown	2006-2009	133	32	55	87
Jenna Klynstra	2010-2013	122	28	54	82
Marissa Dombovy	2007-2010	140	30	46	76
Cheryl Setchell	2002–2005	137	36	40	76
Stephanie Sand	1998–2000	68	38	37	75
Tara French	2004–2007	136	12	60	72
Miriam Drubel	2012–2015	129	31	38	69
Evan Minnick	2007–2010	140	29	39	68
Lauren Pufahl	1998–2001	84	30	37	67
Megan Sullivan	2015–2018	108	36	29	65
Carly McNaughton	2002–2005	138	23	41	64
Kiira Dosdall Jessi Waters	2006–2009 2008–2011	134 137	11 12	52 51	63 63
Beth Rotenberg	2007–2010	140	30	32	62
Maura Crowell Jocelyn Simpson Melissa Kueber	1999–2002 2011–2014 2012–2015	104 130 124	29 26 38	32 35 23	61 61 61

=== Additional records ===
- Points in a game: Heather Murphy, vs RPI 1/14/01....12
- Longest point scoring streak: Sam Hunt, 14 games....21
- Points in a season: Amanda Barre (2004–05).................39
- Most goals in a game: Heather Murphy vs Hamilton 11/30/99....4
- Longest goal scoring streak: Heather Murphy.............12
- Most goals scored in a season: Kristýna Kaltounková (2021–22)...28
- Most goals scored in a career: Kristýna Kaltounková (2020–25).....111
- Most assists in a game: Heather Murphy vs MIT................6
- Longest assist scoring streak: Heather Murphy................15
- Most assists in a season: Becky Irvine............................25
- Most penalty minutes in a game: Kiira Dosdall, Ali Edell, Brittany Phillips....17
- Most consecutive games with a penalty: Brittany Phillips, Kiira Dosdall.....20
- Most penalty minutes in a season: Brittany Phillips........79
- Most penalty minutes in a career: Brittany Phillips......238
- Most power play goals in a season: Brittany Phillips...9
- Most power play goals in a career: Sam Hunt.......24
- Most short handed goals in a season: Jessie Eldridge....4
- Most short handed goals in a career: Sam Hunt.....9
- Most game willing goals in a season: Becky Irvine....9
- Most game-winning goals in a career: Heather Murphy....13
- Most games played in a career: Katelyn Parker....141
- Most consecutive games played: Katelyn Parker...141
- Most minutes in a season: Julia VanDyk....1941:41
- Most minutes in a career: Rebecca Lahar....6072:38
- Most shutouts in a season: Kimberly Sass....5
- Most Consecutive Shutout Minutes: Jen Burtaw....231:24
- Most shutouts in a career: Rebecca Lahar....13
- Most wins in a season: Julia Vandyk....20
- Most wins in a career: Rebecca Lahar...35
- Best goals against average in a season: Brook Wheeler.....1.76
- Best goals against average in a career: Jen Burtaw.........1.96
- Most saves in a season: Rebecca Lahar......1083
- Most saves in a career: Rebecca Lahar...3028
- Best saves percentage in a season: Brook Wheeler.... .931
- Best saves percentage in a career: Elayana Hamashuk... .923

== Notable players ==
- Kiira Dosdall
- Sam Hunt
- Tara French
- Becky Irvine
- Julia Vandyk, 2016–2017, set the record for most career wins with 36; most minutes in a season, 2016–2017; most wins in a season, 20, 2015–2016;
- Liz Auby, 2016–2017, had a shutout streak of three games. It is tied for the longest in program history, while her minutes streak of 200:36 is the second longest in program history behind Jen Burtaw's streak of 231:24 from the 1999–2000 season, before the program entered the Division I level.
- During the 2008–09 season, Kimberly Sass earned ECAC Rookie of the Week honors five times and the ECAC Goaltender of the Week award once. On November 8, 2009, she recorded a career and season high 46 saves as the Raiders defeated Princeton. Against the Yale Bulldogs on January 24, Sass earned a shutout. In three different games, she surpassed 40 saves and eclipsed 30 saves in ten games.
- Maura Crowell, class of 2002, is the head coach of the University of Minnesota Duluth Bulldogs, and was head coach for the USA U-18 women's national ice hockey team in 2017-2018 and 2018-19.

=== International ===
- Livia Altmann, Swiss National Team, Sochi Olympics, Bronze Medal (2014)
- Livia Altmann, Swiss National Team, Pyeongchang Olympics (2018)
- Livia Altmann, Switzerland National Team – Nation Cup (2017–2018)
- Shae Labbe, Canadian National Women's Development Team (2016); 2014–15 Canada Under-18 Team
- Brittany Phillips, IIHF World U18 Championships, Canada, Silver (2009)
- Kaila Pinkney, IIHF World U18 Championships, Canada, Gold
- Lauren Wildfang, IIHF World U18 Championships, Canada, Gold (2014)
- Tara French, Canadian Under 22 Team (2005)
- Becky Irvine, Canadian Under-22 Team (2005)
- Sam Hunt, Canadian Under-22 Team (2006)
- Sam Hunt, Canadian Under-22 Team (2005)
- Malia Schneider, 2014–2015 Canada Under-18 Team
- Rebecca Lahaer, 2004 USA Under-22 Team
- Maura Crowell ('02), Head Coach for the USA Under 18 Team (2017-18 & 2018-19)

=== Raiders in professional hockey ===
= CWHL All-Star	= NWHL All-Star	= Clarkson Cup Champion	= Isobel Cup Champion

Player	Position	Team(s)	League(s)	Years	Championships
Tara French	Defense	Brampton Thunder; Toronto Furies	CWHL		
Kiira Dosdall	Defense	EHV Vienna Sabres Wien 2009–13; Boston Blades 2013-14; Metropolitan Riveters 2015-21	EWHL; CWHL; NWHL		Isobel Cup (2018)
Sam Hunt	Forward	EHV Vienna Sabres 2009–2011; Alberta Honeybadgers 2011–12; EHV Sabres Wein 2013–2014	EWHL; CWHL; EWHL		
Kimberly Sass	Goaltender	Buffalo Beauts 2015–16; Metropolitan Riveters 2017–19 Tri State Region 2019-20	NWHL PWHPA	4	Isobel Cup (2018)
Breanne Wilson-Bennett	Forward	Modo; Toronto Six	SDHL; NWHL		

== Notable fans ==
- Gordon Denis
- Kyle Eldridge
- Mathis Mateus
- In one particular tense rivalry game against Clarkson University, fans Denis and Mateus notably dressed as hot dogs to distract the other team. The method was largely considered successful, as the Raiders walked away with a 4-1 victory.

== See also ==
- Colgate Raiders men's ice hockey
- Colgate Raiders
