= List of Seattle Torrent players =

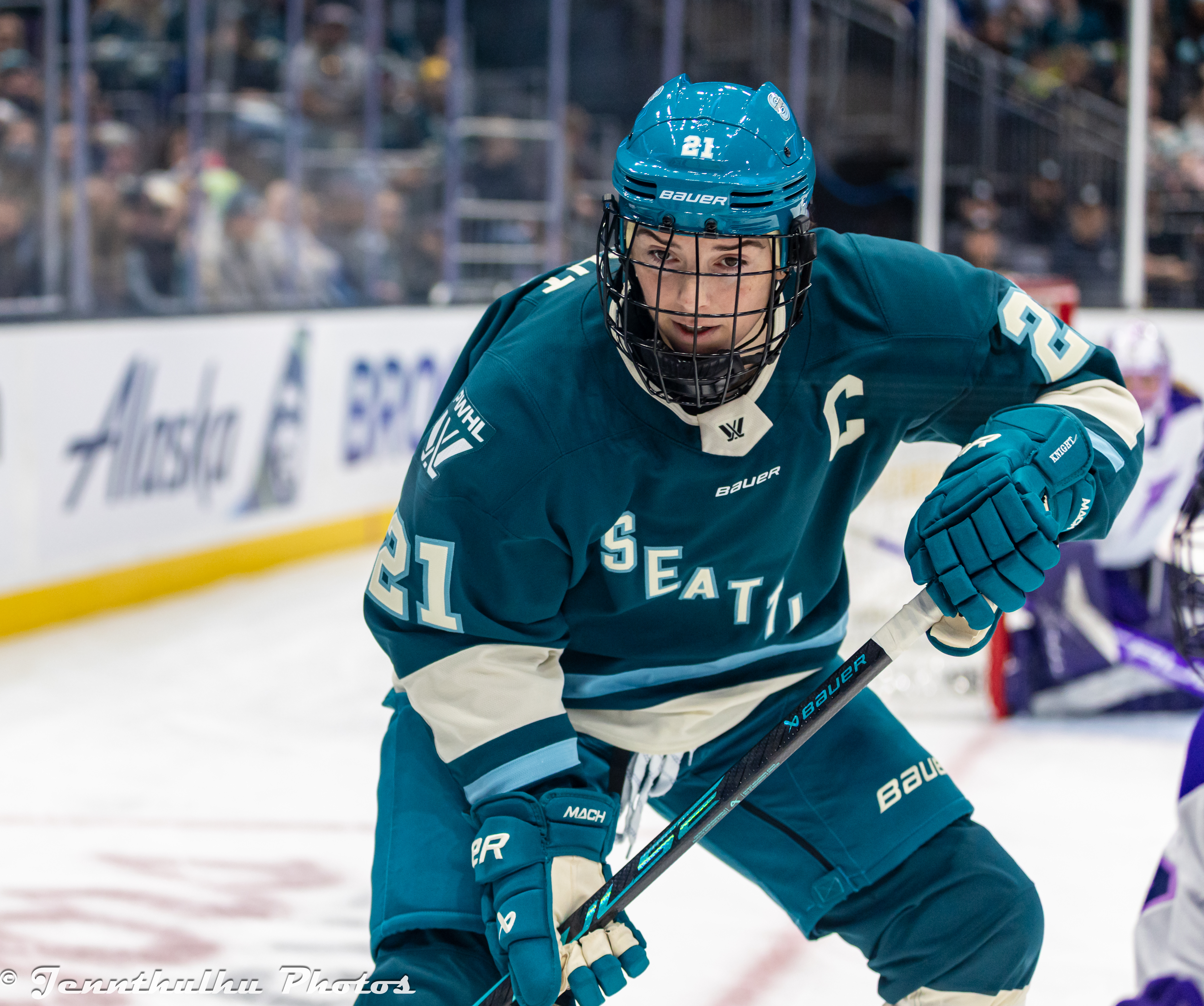
Hilary Knight, the franchise's first captain.

The Seattle Torrent are a professional women's ice hockey team based in Seattle, Washington. The franchise was announced on April 30, 2025, as the Professional Women's Hockey League’s (PWHL) second expansion franchises, alongside Vancouver, increasing the PWHL from six to eight clubs. The team began play in the 2025–26 season and plays its home games at Climate Pledge Arena, sharing the venue with the NHL’s Seattle Kraken, while practicing at the Kraken Community Iceplex. The name "Torrent" was chosen to reflect the waterways, rivers, and maritime character of Washington State and the Pacific Northwest. The team's crest features a stylized "S" designed to resemble flowing water, while its visual identity is built around Slate Green, Shadow Blue, and Glacier Blue, complemented by Foam, Haze Grey, and Basalt Black.

The expansion roster was built around several established international stars, including United States captain Hilary Knight, who became the first captain in franchise history. Seattle made its PWHL debut during the league's opening-night doubleheader on November 21, 2025, against fellow expansion club Vancouver, marking the beginning of a rivalry between the league's westernmost franchises.

During its inaugural 2025–26 campaign, the Torrent helped continue the PWHL's rapid growth in the United States, drawing some of the largest crowds in league history. A February 2026 game at Climate Pledge Arena attracted 17,335 spectators, then one of the highest attendances ever recorded for a professional women's hockey game in the United States. Seattle also participated in the league's first game at Madison Square Garden in April 2026, another milestone event for the PWHL.

As of the conclusion of the 2025–26 season, a total of 28 players have suited up for the Torrent: 3 goaltenders and 25 skaters.

== Key ==
Key of colors and symbols
#	Number worn for majority of tenure with the Torrent
WC	Walter Cup Champion
*	Current member of the Torrent organization (including reserves)
†	Walter Cup champion, retired jersey, or elected to the Hockey Hall of Fame

Skaters
Pos	Position
D	Defenseman
F	Forward

The seasons column lists the first year of the season of the player's first game and the last year of the season of the player's last game. For example, a player who played one game in the 2023–24 season would be listed as playing with the team from 2023–24, regardless of what calendar year the game occurred within.

Statistics are complete to the end of the 2025–26 PWHL season.

== Goaltenders ==
Note: GP = Games played; Min, TOI = Minutes played; W = Wins; L = Losses; OTL = Overtime losses; GA = Goals-against; GAA = Goals-against average; SO = Shutouts; SV% = Save percentage;

Name	#	Nationality	Seasons	Regular season							Playoffs						Notes
Name	#	Nationality	Seasons	GP	W	L	OTL	SO	GAA	SV%	GP	W	L	SO	GAA	SV%	Notes
Jackson, Carly*	70	Canada	2025–present	2	0	0	1	0	4.01	.882	0	0	0	0	0.00	.000	
Murphy, Hannah*	83	Canada	2025–present	12	4	8	0	0	2.87	.908	0	0	0	0	0.00	.000	
Schroeder, Corinne	30	Canada	2025–2026	17	5	8	4	0	2.56	.915	0	0	0	0	0.00	.000	

== Skaters ==
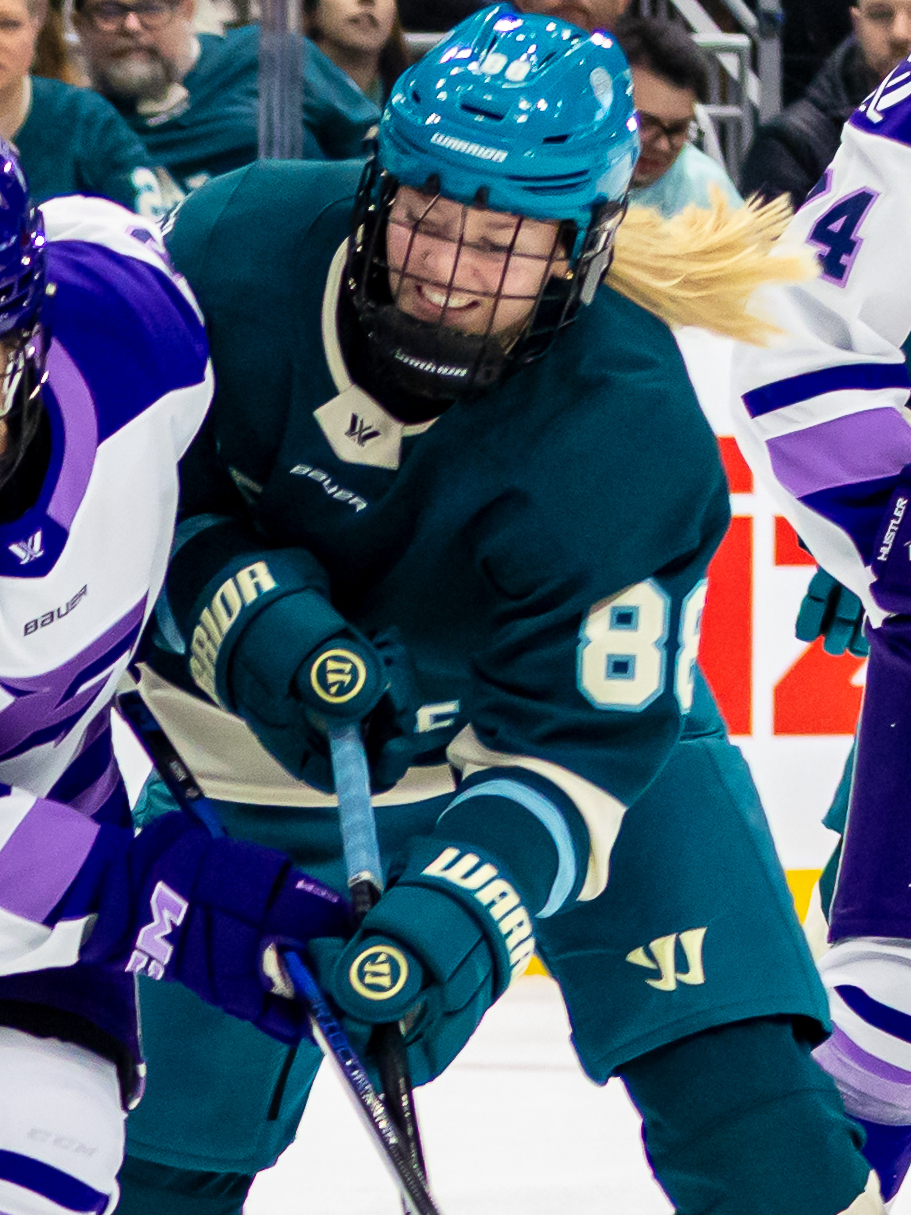
Julia Gosling scored the first goal in franchise history in the inaugural game against the Vancouver Goldeneyes.

Note: GP = Games played; G = Goals; A = Assists; Pts = Points; PIM = Penalty minutes;

Name	#	Nationality	Pos	Seasons	Regular season					Playoffs					Notes
Name	#	Nationality	Pos	Seasons	GP	G	A	Pts	PIM	GP	G	A	Pts	PIM	Notes
Adzija, Lexie*	78	Canada	F	2025–present	30	4	1	5	10	0	0	0	0	0	
Barnes, Cayla	3	United States	D	2025–2026	30	3	5	8	20	0	0	0	0	0	
Bilka, Hannah	19	United States	F	2025–2026	14	4	5	9	4	0	0	0	0	0	
Brown, Emily*	11	United States	D	2025–present	30	0	4	4	12	0	0	0	0	0	
Bryant, Brooke	17	United States	F	2025–2026	23	0	1	1	8	0	0	0	0	0	
Buglioni, Jenna	10	Canada	F	2025–2026	18	0	0	0	2	0	0	0	0	0	
Carpenter, Alex*	25	United States	F	2025–present	30	12	8	20	2	0	0	0	0	0	
Carter, Megan	23	Canada	D	2025–2026	30	1	4	5	26	0	0	0	0	0	
David, Gabrielle*	28	Canada	F	2025–present	9	1	1	2	2	0	0	0	0	0	
Delianedis, Lily*	7	United States	F	2025–present	24	0	2	2	6	0	0	0	0	0	
Eldridge, Jessie	9	Canada	F	2025–2026	19	7	6	13	4	0	0	0	0	0	
Gosling, Julia*	88	Canada	F	2025–present	30	6	14	20	10	0	0	0	0	0	
Grant-Mentis, Mikyla*	13	Canada	F	2025–present	25	3	3	6	8	0	0	0	0	0	
Habisch, Jada	52	United States	F	2025–2026	11	1	0	1	0	0	0	0	0	0	
Keopple, Mariah	20	United States	D	2025–2026	29	0	3	3	0	0	0	0	0	0	
Knight, Hilary	21	United States	F	2025–2026	22	5	9	14	8	0	0	0	0	0	Captain 2025–2026
Langseth, Sydney	71	United States	F	2025–2026	16	0	0	0	0	0	0	0	0	0	
Lobdell, Lyndie*	24	United States	D	2025–present	25	0	4	4	8	0	0	0	0	0	
Serdachny, Danielle*	92	Canada	F	2025–present	30	7	9	16	8	0	0	0	0	0	
Schafzahl, Theresa*	37	Austria	F	2025–present	11	2	7	9	0	0	0	0	0	0	
Snodgrass, Natalie	8	United States	F	2025–2026	29	2	3	5	4	0	0	0	0	0	
Tejralová, Aneta*	2	Czech Republic	D	2025–present	23	2	6	8	25	0	0	0	0	0	
Wagner, Marah*	66	United States	F	2025–present	20	0	0	0	2	0	0	0	0	0	
Wilgren, Anna*	5	United States	D	2025–present	30	3	7	10	26	0	0	0	0	0	
Zumwinkle, Emily*	6	United States	D	2025–present	1	0	0	0	0	0	0	0	0	0	
