= 2025–26 Seattle Torrent season =

Professional Women's Hockey League season

2025–26 Seattle Torrent
- League: 8th PWHL
- 2025–26 record: 8–1–5–16
- Home record: 7–0–3–5
- Road record: 1–1–2–11
- Goals for: 63
- Goals against: 90

Team information
- General manager: Meghan Turner
- Coach: Steve O'Rourke
- Captain: Hilary Knight
- Alternate captains: Emily Brown; Alex Carpenter
- Arena: Climate Pledge Arena
- Average attendance: 12,875

Team leaders
- Goals: Alex Carpenter (12)
- Assists: Julia Gosling (14)
- Points: Alex Carpenter; Julia Gosling (20)
- Penalty minutes: Megan Carter; Anna Wilgren (26)
- Plus/minus: Gabrielle David (+1)
- Wins: Corinne Schroeder (5)
- Goals against average: Corinne Schroeder (2.56)

The 2025–26 Seattle Torrent season is the team's first season as an expansion member of the Professional Women's Hockey League. They play their home games at Climate Pledge Arena in Seattle, Washington.

== Offseason ==
On May 21, 2025, the PWHL named Meghan Turner as the Seattle Torrent's first general manager. She was previously an assistant general manager for the Boston Fleet.

On June 20, 2025, Seattle named Steve O'Rourke their first head coach. He most recently served as the head coach for the Oshawa Generals of the Ontario Hockey League.

On August 21, 2025, Seattle announced the hiring of Christine Bumstead and Clayton Beddoes as assistant coaches. Bumstead previously served as the performance coach for the Saskatoon Blades, and Beddoes previously served as an assistant coach for the Red Deer Rebels, both of the WHL.

On November 14, 2025, Hilary Knight was named the inaugural team captain.

== Schedule and results ==
=== Preseason ===
The preseason schedule was published on October 8, 2025.

Pre-season camp

Date	Opponent	Score	OT	Decision	Location	Box Score/Recap
November 15	@ Vancouver	0–3		Schroeder	Pacific Coliseum	
November 16	@ Vancouver	4–2		Murphy	Pacific Coliseum	

=== Standings ===
Pos	Team	Pld	W	OTW	OTL	L	GF	GA	GD	Pts	Qualification
1	Montreal Victoire (Y)	30	16	6	2	6	78	41	+37	62 (Note: Greater number of games won, excluding games won by Shootout: Montreal 19, Boston 18)	Playoffs
2	Boston Fleet	30	16	5	4	5	74	45	+29	62	Playoffs
3	Minnesota Frost	30	13	3	5	9	91	73	+18	50	Playoffs
4	Ottawa Charge	30	9	8	1	12	71	73	−2	44	Playoffs
5	Toronto Sceptres	30	10	1	6	13	51	72	−21	38	
6	Vancouver Goldeneyes	30	9	3	4	14	68	81	−13	37	
7	New York Sirens	30	9	3	3	15	63	83	−20	36	
8	Seattle Torrent	30	8	1	5	16	64	92	−28	31	

Updated to match(es) played on April 25, 2026. Source: PWHL
(Y) Regular season winner

=== Regular season ===
The regular season schedule was published on October 1, 2025.

Regular season schedule (Home: 7–0–3–5; Road: 1–1–2–11)
November: 0–0–1–1, 1 points (Home: 0–0–0–1; Road: 0–0–1–0)

Game	Date	Opponent	Score	OT	Decision	Location	Attendance	Record	Points	Box Score/Recap
1	November 21	@ Vancouver	3–4	OT	Schroeder	Pacific Coliseum	14,958	0–0–1–0	1	
2	November 28	Minnesota	0–3		Schroeder	Climate Pledge Arena	16,014	0–0–1–1	1	

December: 3–0–0–2, 9 points (Home: 3–0–0–1; Road: 0–0–0–1)

Game	Date	Opponent	Score	OT	Decision	Location	Attendance	Record	Points	Box Score/Recap
3	December 3	New York	2–1		Murphy	Climate Pledge Arena	8,622	1–0–1–1	4	
4	December 17	Ottawa	4–1		Murphy	Climate Pledge Arena	9,389	2–0–1–1	7	
5	December 21	Boston	1–3		Schroeder	Climate Pledge Arena	11,023	2–0–1–2	7	
6	December 23	Montreal	2–1		Murphy	Climate Pledge Arena	10,276	3–0–1–2	10	
7	December 28	@ New York	3–4		Murphy	American Airlines Center	8,514	3–0–1–3	10	

January: 1–1–1–4, 6 points (Home: 1–0–1–1; Road: 0–1–0–3)

Game	Date	Opponent	Score	OT	Decision	Location	Attendance	Record	Points	Box Score/Recap
8	January 3	@ Toronto	3–2	SO	Schroeder	TD Coliseum	16,012	3–1–1–3	12	
9	January 7	@ Boston	1–2		Schroeder	Agganis Arena	6,003	3–1–1–4	12	
10	January 11	@ Minnesota	2–6		Murphy	Grand Casino Arena	9,787	3–1–1–5	12	
11	January 18	Boston	1–2	SO	Schroeder	Climate Pledge Arena	12,774	3–1–2–5	13	
12	January 20	Toronto	6–4		Schroeder	Climage Pledge Arena	10,160	4–1–2–5	16	
13	January 25	Vancouver	1–3		Murphy	Ball Arena	11,612	4–1–2–6	16	
14	January 28	@ Ottawa	2–4		Schroeder	TD Place Arena	6,787	4–1–2–7	16	

February: 0–0–0–1, 0 points (Home: 0–0–0–1; Road: 0–0–0–0)

Game	Date	Opponent	Score	OT	Decision	Location	Attendance	Record	Points	Box Score/Recap
15	February 27	Toronto	2–5		Murphy	Climate Pledge Arena	17,335	4–1–2–8	16	

March: 2–0–0–6, 6 points (Home: 2–0–0–1; Road: 0–0–0–5)

Game	Date	Opponent	Score	OT	Decision	Location	Attendance	Record	Points	Box Score/Recap
16	March 4	@ Ottawa	3–4		Murphy	TD Place Arena	6,997	4–1–2–9	16	
17	March 11	Boston	3–2		Schroeder	Climate Pledge Arena	13,350	5–1–2–9	19	
18	March 13	@ Minnesota	1–4		Schroeder	Grand Casino Arena	11,120	5–1–2–10	19	
19	March 15	@ Toronto	0–2		Murphy	Coca-Cola Coliseum	8,270	5–1–2–11	19	
20	March 19	@ Montreal	1–4		Murphy	Place Bell	10,033	5–1–2–12	19	
21	March 21	@ Boston	0–3		Schroeder	Tsongas Center	6,164	5–1–2–13	19	
22	March 25	New York	4–1		Schroeder	Allstate Arena	10,006	6–1–2–13	22	
23	March 29	Ottawa	0–2		Schroeder	Climate Pledge Arena	16,586	6–1–2–14	22	

April: 2–0–3–2, 8 points (Home: 1–0–2–0; Road: 1–0–1–2)

Game	Date	Opponent	Score	OT	Decision	Location	Attendance	Record	Points	Box Score/Recap
24	April 4	@ New York	1–2	SO	Schroeder	Madison Square Garden	18,006	6–1–3–14	23	
25	April 7	@ Montreal	1–4		Murphy	Place Bell	9,247	6–1–3–15	23	
26	April 8	@ Ottawa	5–3		Schroeder	TD Place Arena	6,644	7–1–3–15	26	
27	April 14	@ Vancouver	1–4		Schroeder	Pacific Coliseum	10,094	7–1–3–16	26	
28	April 18	Vancouver	5–6	OT	Jackson	Climate Pledge Arena	12,719	7–1–4–16	27	
29	April 22	Minnesota	5–4		Murphy	Climate Pledge Arena	11,982	8–1–4–16	30	
30	April 25	Montreal	1–2	SO	Schroeder	Climate Pledge Arena	17,151	8–1–5–16	31	

Regulation Win (3 points) Overtime/Shootout win (2 points) Overtime/shootout loss (1 point) Regulation Loss (0 points)

== Player statistics ==
As of April 26, 2026

=== Skaters ===
Regular Season
Player	GP	G	A	Pts	SOG	+/−	PIM
Alex Carpenter	30	12	8	20	90	–6	2
Julia Gosling	30	6	14	20	95	–9	10
Danielle Serdachny	30	7	9	16	75	–1	8
Hilary Knight	22	5	9	14	67	0	8
Anna Wilgren	30	3	7	10	52	–11	26
Hannah Bilka	14	4	5	9	38	–6	4
Theresa Schafzahl	11	2	7	9	22	0	0
Cayla Barnes	30	3	5	8	63	–16	20
Aneta Tejralová	23	2	6	8	28	–4	25
Mikyla Grant-Mentis	25	3	3	6	47	–7	8
Lexie Adzija	30	4	1	5	43	–14	10
Natalie Snodgrass	29	2	3	5	40	–14	4
Megan Carter	30	1	4	5	26	–4	26
Lyndie Lobdell	25	0	4	4	15	–1	8
Emily Brown	30	0	4	4	20	–7	12
Mariah Keopple	29	0	3	3	12	–5	0
Gabrielle David	9	1	1	2	10	+1	2
Lily Delianedis	24	0	2	2	7	–5	6
Jada Habisch	11	1	0	1	6	–3	0
Brooke Bryant	23	0	1	1	12	–6	8
Emily Zumwinkle	1	0	0	0	0	0	0
Sydney Langseth	16	0	0	0	9	–4	0
Jenna Buglioni	18	0	0	0	4	–3	2
Marah Wagner	20	0	0	0	12	–4	2

=== Goaltenders ===
Regular Season
Player	GP	TOI	W	L	OT	SOL	GA	GAA	SA	SV%	SO	G	A	PIM
Corinne Schroeder	17	1008:56	5	8	1	3	43	2.56	505	0.915	0	0	0	0
Hannah Murphy	12	709:44	4	8	0	0	34	2.87	371	0.908	0	0	1	0
Carly Jackson	2	89:44	0	0	1	0	6	4.01	51	0.882	0	0	0	0

== Awards and honors ==
The Torrent's first home game was attended by 16,014 fans, setting a record for the highest attendance at a professional women's hockey game at a U.S. arena. The same game set the record for the highest attendance at a PWHL team's main arena, surpassing the 14,958 who attended the Vancouver Goldeneyes' first home game, against the Torrent, a week earlier. The Torrent's U.S. arena attendance record was surpassed later in the 2025–26 season by a PWHL Takeover Tour game between the Montreal Victoire and New York Sirens at Capital One Arena in Washington, D.C., where 17,228 fans attended. The Torrent sold out Climate Pledge Arena for the first time on February 27, 2026, their first game following the 2026 Winter Olympics, retaking the U.S. attendance record with a crowd of 17,335. The team set another U.S. attendance record on April 4, 2026, when they played at the Sirens at a sold-out Madison Square Garden, with 18,006 fans in attendance.

=== Milestones ===
Regular season
Date	Player	Milestone
November 21, 2025	Julia Gosling	1st goal in franchise history
November 21, 2025	Anna Wilgren	1st assist in franchise history
November 21, 2025	Anna Wilgren	10th career PWHL assist
November 21, 2025	Hilary Knight	20th career PWHL assist
November 21, 2025	Jenna Buglioni	1st career PWHL game
November 21, 2025	Marah Wagner	1st career PWHL game
November 21, 2025	Corinne Schroeder	1st overtime loss in franchise history
November 28, 2025	Lyndie Lobdell	1st career PWHL game
November 28, 2025	Corinne Schroeder	1st loss in franchise history
December 3, 2025	Alex Carpenter	20th goal in PWHL career
December 3, 2025	Hannah Murphy	1st win in franchise history
December 3, 2025	Hannah Murphy	1st career PWHL game
December 17, 2025	Julia Gosling	10th career PWHL goal
December 17, 2025	Hannah Bilka	10th career PWHL assist
December 17, 2025	Lily Delianedis	1st career PWHL game
December 21, 2025	Mikyla Grant-Mentis	10th career PWHL assist
December 28, 2025	Lexie Adzija	10th career PWHL goal
December 28, 2025	Lyndie Lobdell	1st career PWHL assist
December 28, 2025	Hannah Murphy	1st career PWHL assist
December 28, 2025	Hannah Murphy	1st career PWHL loss
December 28, 2025	Alex Carpenter	1st career PWHL penalty
January 3, 2026	Alex Carpenter	50th career PWHL point
January 3, 2026	Julia Gosling	10th career PWHL assist
January 3, 2026	Mariah Keopple	5th career PWHL assist
January 3, 2026	Lily Delianedis	1st career PWHL penalty
January 3, 2026	Corinne Schroeder	1st shootout/overtime win in franchise history
January 11, 2026	Marah Wagner	1st career PWHL penalty
January 20, 2026	Megan Carter	1st career PWHL goal
January 20, 2026	Emily Brown	10th career PWHL assist
January 20, 2026	Lyndie Lobdell	1st career PWHL penalty
January 25, 2026	Jessie Eldridge	20th career PWHL goal
January 28, 2026	Danielle Serdachny	10th career PWHL assist
February 27, 2026	Aneta Tejralová	5th career PWHL goal
February 27, 2026	Sydney Langseth	1st career PWHL game
March 4, 2026	Alex Carpenter	30th career PWHL assist
March 4, 2026	Julia Gosling	15th career PWHL assist
March 11, 2026	Danielle Serdachny	5th career PWHL goal
March 15, 2026	Jada Habisch	1st career PWHL game
March 25, 2026	Aneta Tejralová	20th career PWHL assist
March 25, 2026	Theresa Schafzahl	15th career PWHL assist
March 25, 2026	Danielle Serdachny	15th career PWHL assist
April 7, 2026	Theresa Schafzahl	10th career PWHL goal
April 8, 2026	Jada Habisch	1st career PWHL goal
April 8, 2026	Megan Carter	5th career PWHL assist
April 8, 2026	Gabrielle David	5th career PWHL assist
April 8, 2026	Lily Delianedis	1st career PWHL assist
April 14, 2026	Lexia Adzija	10th career PWHL assist
April 18, 2026	Anna Wilgren	5th career PWHL goal
April 18, 2026	Cayla Barnes	5th career PWHL goal
April 18, 2026	Cayla Barnes	15th career PWHL assist
April 22, 2026	Alex Carpenter	30th career PWHL goal
April 22, 2026	Julia Gosling	20th career PWHL assist
April 22, 2026	Anna Wilgren	15th career PWHL assist
April 25, 2026	Emily Zumwinkle	1st career PWHL game

== Transactions ==
=== Draft ===
The 2025 PWHL Draft was held on June 24, 2025.

Due to the additions of the Vancouver Goldeneyes and Seattle Torrent teams, an expansion draft was held on June 9, 2025. Seattle acquired Aneta Tejralová, Hannah Bilka, Jessie Eldridge, Julia Gosling, Anna Wilgren, Megan Carter, and Emily Brown in the expansion draft.

Drafted prospect signings
Date	Player	Draft	Term	Ref
July 15, 2025	Jenna Buglioni	First round, eighth overall (2025)	Two years	
July 16, 2025	Hannah Murphy	Second round, 15th overall (2025)	Two years	
November 20, 2025	Lily Delianedis	Third round, 24th overall (2025)	One year	
November 20, 2025	Lyndie Lobdell	Fifth round, 40th overall (2025)	One year	
November 20, 2025	Jada Habisch	Fourth round, 31st overall (2025)	Reserve player contract	

=== Free agency ===
The free agency period began on June 16, 2025 at 9:00 am ET, with a pause between June 27 and July 8. Prior to the start of the free agency period, there was an exclusive signing window from June 4–8 for the Seattle and Vancouver expansion teams.

Free agent signings
Date	Player	Previous team	Term	Ref
June 5, 2025 (Note: Expansion team exclusive signing window.)	Hilary Knight	Boston Fleet	One year	
June 5, 2025	Danielle Serdachny	Ottawa Charge	Two years	
June 5, 2025	Cayla Barnes	Montreal Victoire	Three years	
June 6, 2025	Alex Carpenter	New York Sirens	One year	
June 6, 2025	Corinne Schroeder	New York Sirens	Two years	
June 17, 2025	Mariah Keopple	Montreal Victoire	One year	
June 17, 2025	Lexie Adzija	Boston Fleet	Two years	
June 18, 2025	Natalie Snodgrass	Ottawa Charge	One year	
June 20, 2025	Mikyla Grant-Mentis	Montreal Victoire	Two years	
July 9, 2025	Carly Jackson	Toronto Sceptres	One year	
July 10, 2025	Anna Wilgren	Montreal Victoire (Note: Restricted free agent selected in expansion draft.)	One year	
November 20, 2025	Brooke Bryant	Minnesota Frost	One year	
November 20, 2025	Marah Wagner	Skellefteå AIK (SDHL)	One year	
November 20, 2025	Sydney Langseth	Minnesota State University (WCHA)	Reserve player contract	
November 20, 2025	Emily Zumwinkle	Ohio State University (WCHA)	Reserve player contract	
