= List of Montreal Victoire players =

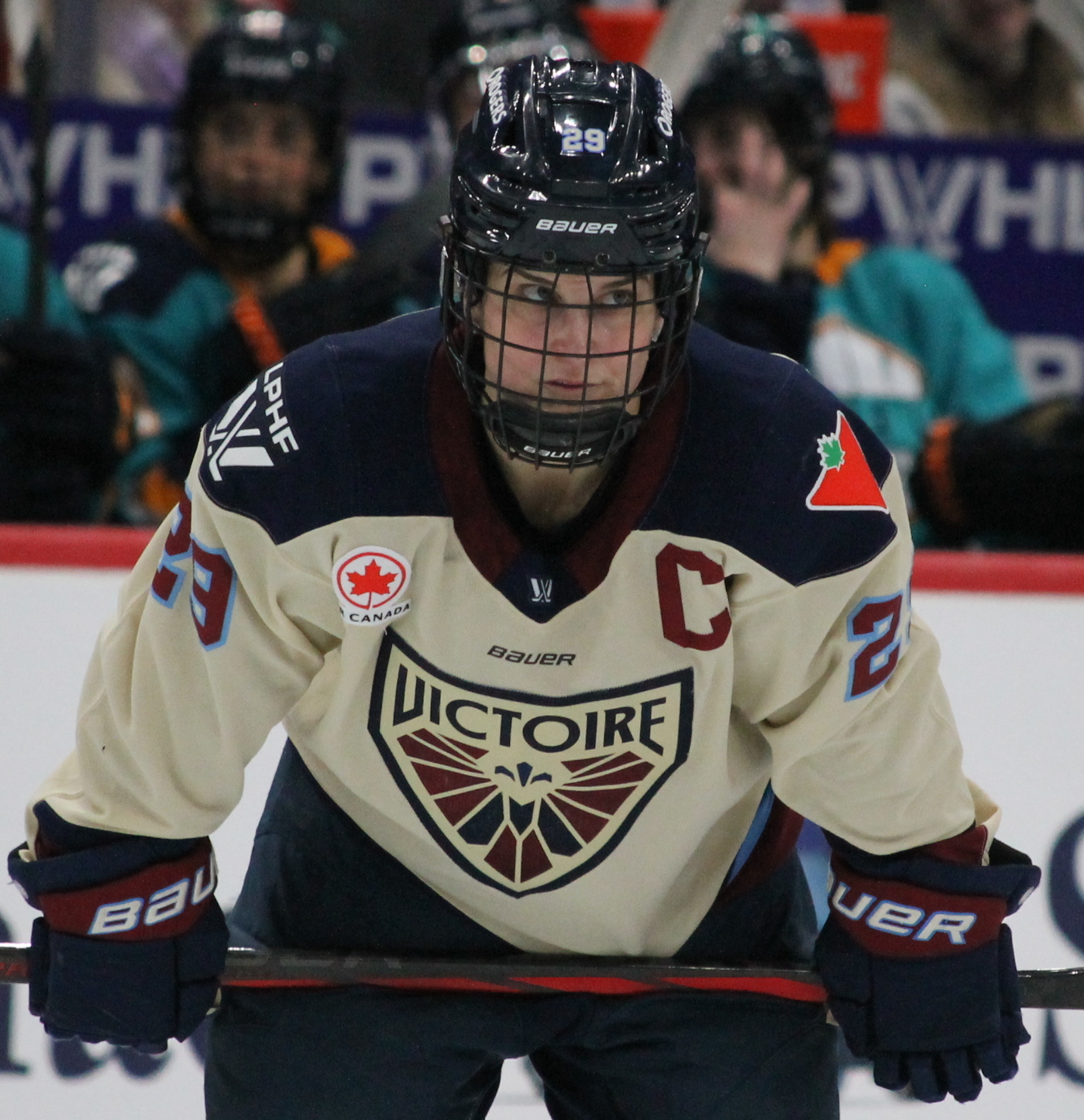
Marie-Philip Poulin, the Victoire's first and current captain.

The Montreal Victoire are a professional women's ice hockey team based in Montreal, Quebec, Canada. Founded on August 29, 2023, they are one of the six original franchises of the Professional Women's Hockey League (PWHL). Montreal plays its home games at Place Bell in Laval. As of the conclusion of the 2025–26 PWHL season, 51 players have appeared in at least one game for the franchise, including 3 goaltenders and 48 skaters.

The Victoire played their inaugural game on January 2, 2024, defeating PWHL Ottawa 3–2 in overtime. The first goal in franchise history was scored by Laura Stacey in that same game. Montreal’s first home win came later that week in front of a sold-out crowd, with goaltender Ann-Renée Desbiens making 32 saves in a 4–1 win over PWHL Minnesota.

Several players from the inaugural roster played key roles in establishing the team’s competitive identity. Desbiens recorded the franchise’s first shutout on February 18, 2024, stopping all 28 shots faced in a 2–0 victory over PWHL Boston. On March 12, 2024, forward Marie-Philip Poulin became the first player in PWHL history to record a natural hat trick, leading Montreal to a comeback win over PWHL Toronto.

Montreal has developed rivalries with other Canadian PWHL franchises, particularly Toronto and Ottawa, helping to boost fan enthusiasm and solidify its place in the city’s sports scene. The Victoire’s fanbase and roster have made them one of the early powerhouses of the league.

== Key ==
Key of colours and symbols
#	Number worn for majority of tenure with the Victoire
WC	Walter Cup Champion
*	Current member of the Victoire organization (including reserves)
†	Walter Cup champion, retired jersey, or elected to the Hockey Hall of Fame

Skaters
Pos	Position
D	Defender
F	Forward

The seasons column lists the first year of the season of the player's first game and the last year of the season of the player's last game. For example, a player who played one game in the 2023–24 season would be listed as playing with the team from 2023–24, regardless of what calendar year the game occurred within.

Statistics are complete to the end of the 2025–26 PWHL season.

== Goaltenders ==
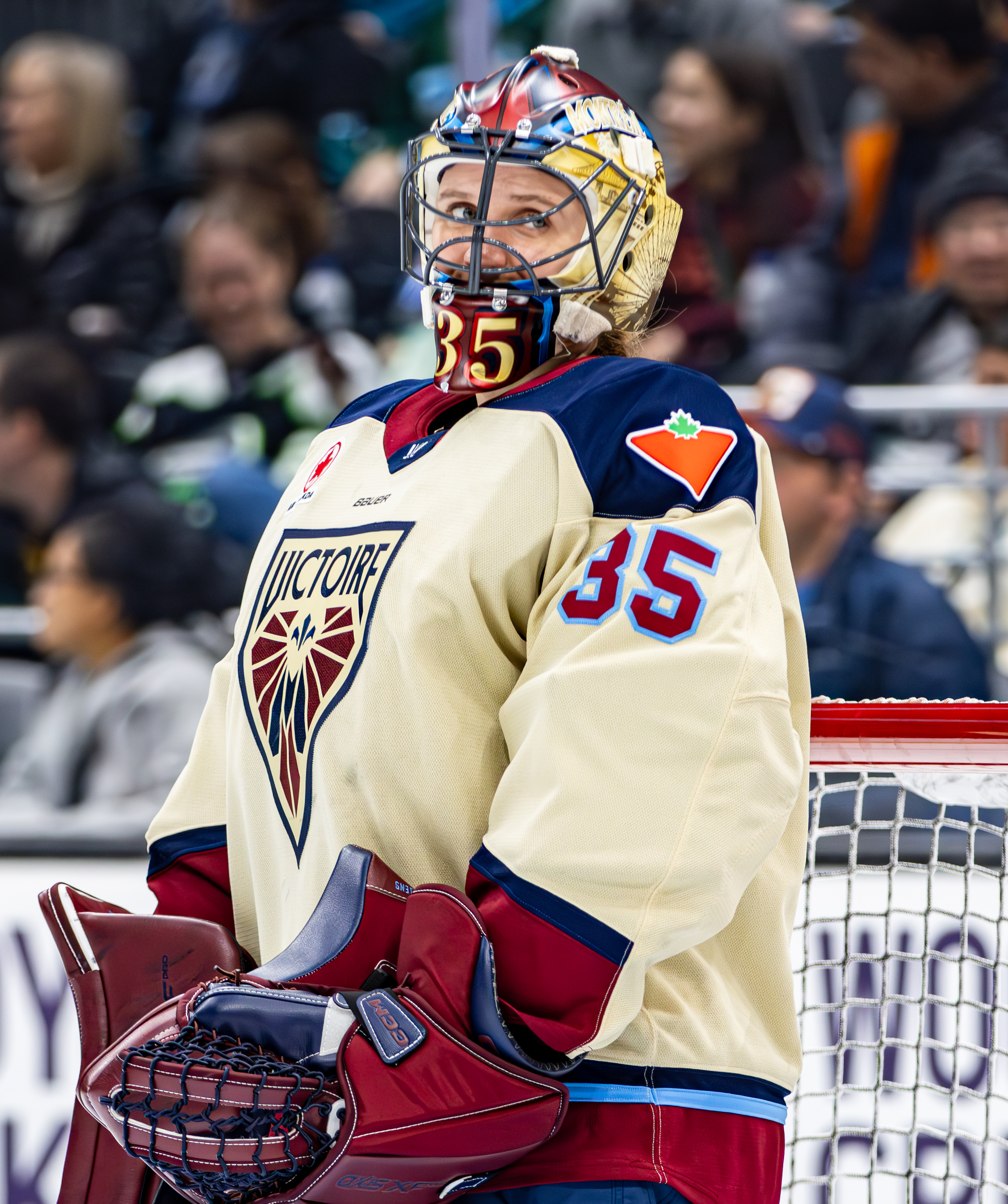
Ann-Renée Desbiens won the PWHL Goaltender of the Year award in 2025.

Note: GP = Games played; Min, TOI = Minutes played; W = Wins; L = Losses; OTL = Overtime losses; GA = Goals-against; GAA = Goals-against average; SO = Shutouts; SV% = Save percentage;

Name	#	Nationality	Seasons	Regular season							Playoffs						Notes
Name	#	Nationality	Seasons	GP	W	L	OTL	SO	GAA	SV%	GP	W	L	SO	GAA	SV%	Notes
Abstreiter, Sandra*†	30	Germany	2025–present	5	3	2	0	1	2.62	.905	0	0	0	0	0.00	.000	WC 2026
Chuli, Elaine	20	Canada	2023–2025	19	10	7	2	0	2.06	.929	0	0	0	0	0.00	.000	
Desbiens, Ann-Renée*†	35	Canada	2023–present	62	41	11	5	8	1.66	.938	16	7	9	2	1.50	.941	WC 2026, PWHL Goaltender of the Year 2025

== Skaters ==
Note: GP = Games played; G = Goals; A = Assists; Pts = Points; PIM = Penalty minutes;

Name	#	Nationality	Pos	Seasons	Regular season					Playoffs					Notes
Name	#	Nationality	Pos	Seasons	GP	G	A	Pts	PIM	GP	G	A	Pts	PIM	Notes
Ambrose, Erin†	23	Canada	D	2023–2026	73	4	33	37	10	16	0	5	5	2	WC 2026; PWHL Defender of the Year 2024
Barnes, Cayla	3	United States	D	2024–2025	30	2	11	13	12	4	0	0	0	0	
Bettez, Ann-Sophie	24	Canada	F	2023–2024	15	2	3	5	2	0	0	0	0	0	
Bizal, Madison	6	United States	D	2023–2024	21	0	2	2	4	3	0	1	1	0	
Boreen, Abigail	24	United States	F	2024–2025	30	6	8	14	12	4	0	0	0	0	
Boulier, Amanda†	44	United States	D	2023–2026	61	1	11	12	12	16	0	0	0	8	WC 2026; Intact Impact Award 2025
Bujold, Sarah	26	Canada	F	2023–2024	21	3	1	4	18	0	0	0	0	0	
Daoust, Catherine*	4	Canada	D	2023–present	25	1	1	2	12	3	0	0	0	0	
Daoust, Mélodie	25	Canada	F	2023–2024	6	3	2	5	4	3	0	0	0	2	
Dalton, Claire	42	Canada	F	2023–2025	50	8	10	18	4	6	0	0	0	0	
Darkangelo, Shiann†	27	United States	F	2025–2026	30	4	4	8	4	9	1	0	1	0	WC 2026; Intact Impact Award 2026
David, Gabrielle	8	Canada	F	2023–2025	26	2	4	6	4	3	0	0	0	0	
DeGeorge, Clair	26	United States	F	2024–2025	26	0	2	2	4	1	0	0	0	0	
Dempsey, Jillian	14	United States	F	2023–2024	24	1	3	4	2	3	0	0	0	0	
DiGirolamo, Jessica*†	22	Canada	D	2025–present	29	1	2	3	10	9	0	1	1	0	WC 2026
Downie-Landry, Jade*†	77	Canada	F	2025–present	23	2	0	2	6	3	0	0	0	0	WC 2026
Dubois, Catherine*†	28	Canada	F	2023–present	69	12	8	20	45	16	2	0	2	6	WC 2026
Flaherty, Maggie*†	91	United States	D	2025–present	30	4	5	9	35	9	3	1	4	8	WC 2026
Gardiner, Jennifer	12	Canada	F	2024–2025	30	5	13	18	2	4	0	3	3	0	
Giaquinto, Tamara*†	12	Canada	D	2025–present	12	0	0	0	0	0	0	0	0	0	WC 2026
Gosling, Nicole†	61	Canada	D	2025–2026	30	3	16	19	10	9	1	2	3	6	WC 2026
Grant-Mentis, Mikyla	18	Canada	F	2023–2025	37	5	5	10	22	7	0	1	1	0	
Greig, Dara†	17	United States	F	2024–2026	58	3	5	8	36	13	0	1	1	4	WC 2026
Irving, Skylar*†	88	United States	F	2025–present	27	3	6	9	12	2	0	0	0	0	WC 2026
Keopple, Mariah	2	United States	D	2023–2025	53	3	4	7	26	7	0	0	0	4	
Kjellbin, Anna	71	Sweden	D	2024–2025	18	0	1	1	4	0	0	0	0	0	
Labad, Maya*†	4	Canada	F	2025–present	6	1	0	1	4	0	0	0	0	0	WC 2026
Labelle, Alexandra*†	13	Canada	F	2024–present	47	1	7	8	6	13	0	0	0	2	WC 2026
Laganière, Brigitte	10	Canada	D	2023–2024	17	0	1	1	0	3	0	0	0	0	
Lásková, Dominika	96	Czech Republic	D	2023–2025	12	0	0	0	10	0	0	0	0	0	
Lefort, Sarah	16	Canada	F	2023–2024	24	1	4	5	10	2	0	0	0	0	
Ljungblom, Lina*†	25	Sweden	F	2024–present	50	7	8	15	16	13	1	1	2	2	WC 2026
Lum, Leah	12	Canada	F	2023–2024	23	1	3	4	6	3	0	0	0	0	
Marchment, Kennedy	22	Canada	F	2023–2025	9	1	1	2	0	0	0	0	0	0	
Mattivi, Nadia*†	93	Italy	D	2025–present	6	0	0	0	2	4	0	1	1	4	WC 2026
Mlýnková, Natálie†	96	Czech Republic	F	2025–2026	30	5	5	10	6	9	0	0	0	0	WC 2026
Murphy, Maureen†	21	United States	F	2023–2026	73	12	17	29	14	16	4	4	8	6	WC 2026; Hockey For All Award 2024
Nadeau, Kelly-Ann*†	51	Canada	D	2024–present	10	0	0	0	0	0	0	0	0	0	WC 2026
O'Neill, Kristin	43	Canada	F	2023–2025	53	5	9	14	32	7	3	1	4	2	
Poulin, Marie-Philip*†	29	Canada	F	2023–present	70	38	29	67	55	16	4	8	12	8	WC 2026; Ilana Kloss Playoff MVP 2026; Billie Jean King MVP Award 2025; PWHL Forward of the Year 2025; PWHL Top Goal Scorer Award 2025; Captain 2023–present
Poznikoff, Alex	17	Canada	F	2023–2024	8	0	0	0	0	1	0	0	0	0	
Roque, Abby*†	11	United States	F	2025–present	29	8	14	22	31	9	4	4	8	6	WC 2026
Scamurra, Hayley†	16	United States	F	2025–2026	30	8	8	16	20	9	2	2	4	0	WC 2026
Stacey, Laura*†	7	Canada	F	2023–present	80	28	34	62	20	16	4	5	9	10	WC 2026; Hockey For All Award 2025
Tabin, Kati*†	9	Canada	D	2023–present	82	7	19	26	49	16	1	2	3	10	WC 2026
Vanišová, Tereza	21	Czech Republic	F	2023–2024	17	2	8	10	16	0	0	0	0	0	
Wilgren, Anna	5	United States	D	2024–2025	30	3	6	9	8	4	0	3	3	0	
Willoughby, Kaitlin*†	19	Canada	F	2024–present	36	3	4	7	4	13	0	1	1	0	WC 2026
