= Emily Brown (ice hockey) =

American ice hockey player (born 1998)

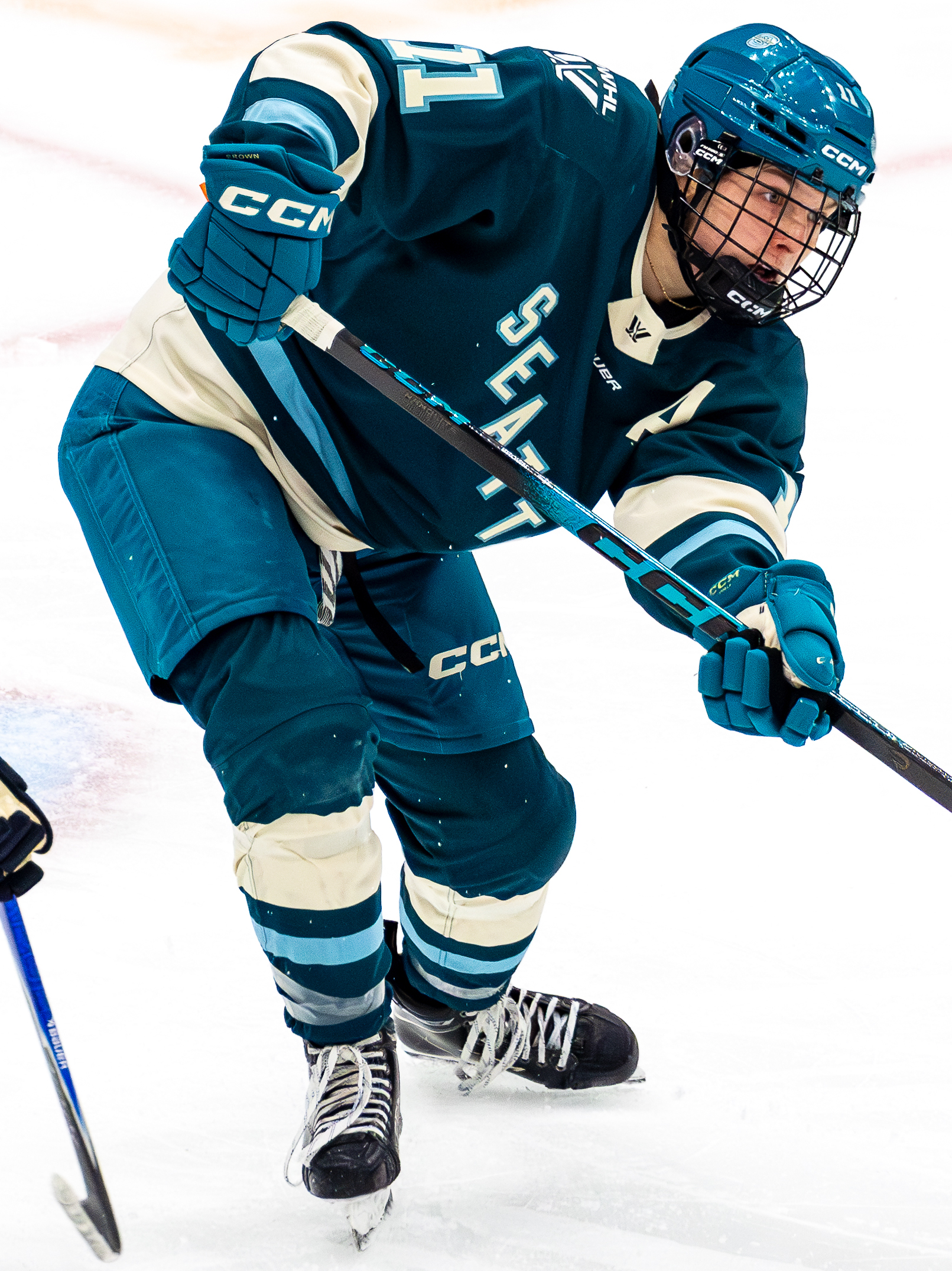
- Brown with the Seattle Torrent in 2026
- Born: December 30, 1998 (age 27) Blaine, Minnesota, U.S.
- Height: 5 ft 7 in (170 cm)
- Position: Defence
- Shoots: Left
- PWHL team Former teams: Seattle Torrent; Boston Fleet

Emily Brown (born December 30, 1998) is an American ice hockey player who is a defender for the Seattle Torrent of the Professional Women's Hockey League (PWHL), where she serves as an alternate captain. She previously played for the Boston Fleet of the PWHL and was part of their Walter Cup finals appearance during the league's inaugural season.

Brown played college ice hockey for the Minnesota Golden Gophers women's ice hockey program, serving as co-captain for two seasons and captain for one season. Known as a shutdown defender, she finished her college career ranked second in program history in games played (167) and earned All-WCHA honors four times, while also being recognized as a WCHA Scholar-Athlete for four consecutive years.

Internationally, Brown won a gold medal with the United States national under-18 team at the 2016 IIHF World Women's U18 Championship and has represented the United States at the U-22 level and senior national team, including appearances in the Rivalry Series against Canada.

== Early life ==
Born and raised in Blaine, Minnesota, Brown is one of four children of Deb and Brian Brown. During her high school career at Blaine High School, Brown was a standout three-sport athlete, earning 12 varsity letters across ice hockey, soccer, and track and field. She served as captain for all three sports during her senior year. As a senior in 2016-17, Brown recorded 45 points (16 goals, 29 assists) in 30 games, leading the Blaine Bengals to a 24-4-2 record and a runner-up finish at the 2017 Minnesota State Class AA Tournament. She was named a finalist for the 2017 Ms. Hockey Award, presented to the top senior girls' high school hockey player in Minnesota. She earned all-conference, all-metro, and all-state honors, and she was a three-time academic all-state honoree.

Brown's high school achievements included being named to the USA Today High School Sports All-USA Second Team for ice hockey in both 2016 and 2017, as well as receiving the 2017 Athena Award. She was also a two-time Minnesota State Class AA all-tournament team member, leading the Bengals to the 2015 Minnesota State Class AA Tournament consolation championship as a sophomore.

Brown played club ice hockey for the Minnesota Junior Whitecaps in the Upper Midwest High School Elite League. She received the Herb Brooks Award in 2017, honoring her as the "most qualified player" at that year's Minnesota Girls' AA state ice hockey tournament.

== Playing career ==
=== College ===
Brown played five seasons with the Minnesota Golden Gophers women's ice hockey program in the Western Collegiate Hockey Association (WCHA) conference of the NCAA Division I. She played in every game of her first four seasons and ended her career ranked second among the university's leaders in career games played (167 games), ninth in career points by a defender (89 points), and tenth in career goals by a defender (20 goals). She was named to an All-WCHA team on four occasions – to the All-WCHA Second Team for the 2018–19 season, 2019–20 season, and 2020–21 season, and to the All-WCHA Third Team for the 2021–22 season. Brown's achievements as a student were equally praised: she was named a WCHA Scholar-Athlete, a member of the WCHA All-Academic Team, and an Academic All-Big Ten honoree for each of her final four years at the University of Minnesota.

During her sophomore season (2018-19), Brown was a key contributor to Minnesota's NCAA Tournament runner-up finish. She recorded 27 points (4 goals, 23 assists) on the season while ranking second among WCHA defenders in scoring. The Gophers posted a 32-6-1 record and allowed just 69 goals for the season, with Brown forming part of the team's top defensive pairing. She added seven blocked shots during the NCAA Tournament run, which culminated in a 2-0 loss to Wisconsin in the championship game. Brown was named to the All-WCHA Second Team for the 2018-19 season, the first of three consecutive second-team selections.

Brown served as an assistant captain during the 2020-21 season and was promoted to co-captain for the 2021-22 season, before serving as sole captain during her fifth season (2022-23). During the COVID-19 pandemic, she was among three players who accepted an additional year of eligibility to return for the 2021-22 season. In her co-captain role during the 2020-21 season, Brown led all Gophers defenders with 12 points (3 goals, 9 assists) and tied for second on the team with 27 blocked shots.

Brown developed a reputation as a stay-at-home defender, known for her physical play and shot-blocking ability. Despite not being the largest defender, she was praised by head coach Brad Frost for her physicality, using her body effectively to separate players from the puck, and for her excellent stick work in deflecting passes and shots. Teammate Taylor Wente described Brown as calm on the ice and smart with puck decisions.

Brown majored in mechanical engineering while competing for the Gophers balancing a rigorous engineering curriculum with her hockey commitments. She was recognized as a WCHA Scholar-Athlete, WCHA All-Academic Team member, and Academic All-Big Ten honoree for each of her final four years at the University of Minnesota. She also earned CoSIDA Academic All-District honors.

=== Professional ===
==== Professional Women's Hockey Players Association (2022–2023) ====
Following her graduation from the University of Minnesota in 2022, Brown joined the Professional Women's Hockey Players Association (PWHPA), an organization established to advocate for a sustainable professional women's ice hockey league in North America. She was assigned to Team Sonnet for the 2022-23 season, which competed in the organization's Secret Dream Gap Tour showcases across North America. Team Sonnet featured a veteran-laden roster with notable players including Hilary Knight, Brianne Jenner, and Hannah Brandt, as well as Olympic defenders Erin Ambrose, Claire Thompson, and Micah Zandee-Hart. The team was coached by Laura McIntosh, with Rebecca Michael serving as general manager.

Brown appeared in 20 games for Team Sonnet during the season, playing alongside future PWHL teammates including Hannah Brandt, who would later join her on the Boston Fleet. The season culminated with Team Sonnet winning the PWHPA championship in March 2023.

In addition to her regular season duties, Brown was selected to represent the PWHPA at the 2023 Warrior/ECHL All-Star Classic in Norfolk, Virginia on January 16, 2023, alongside Team Sonnet teammate Samantha Cogan. The three-on-three showcase format featured players from the PWHPA, Premier Hockey Federation, and ECHL, aimed at promoting women's professional hockey.

==== Boston Fleet (2023–2025) ====
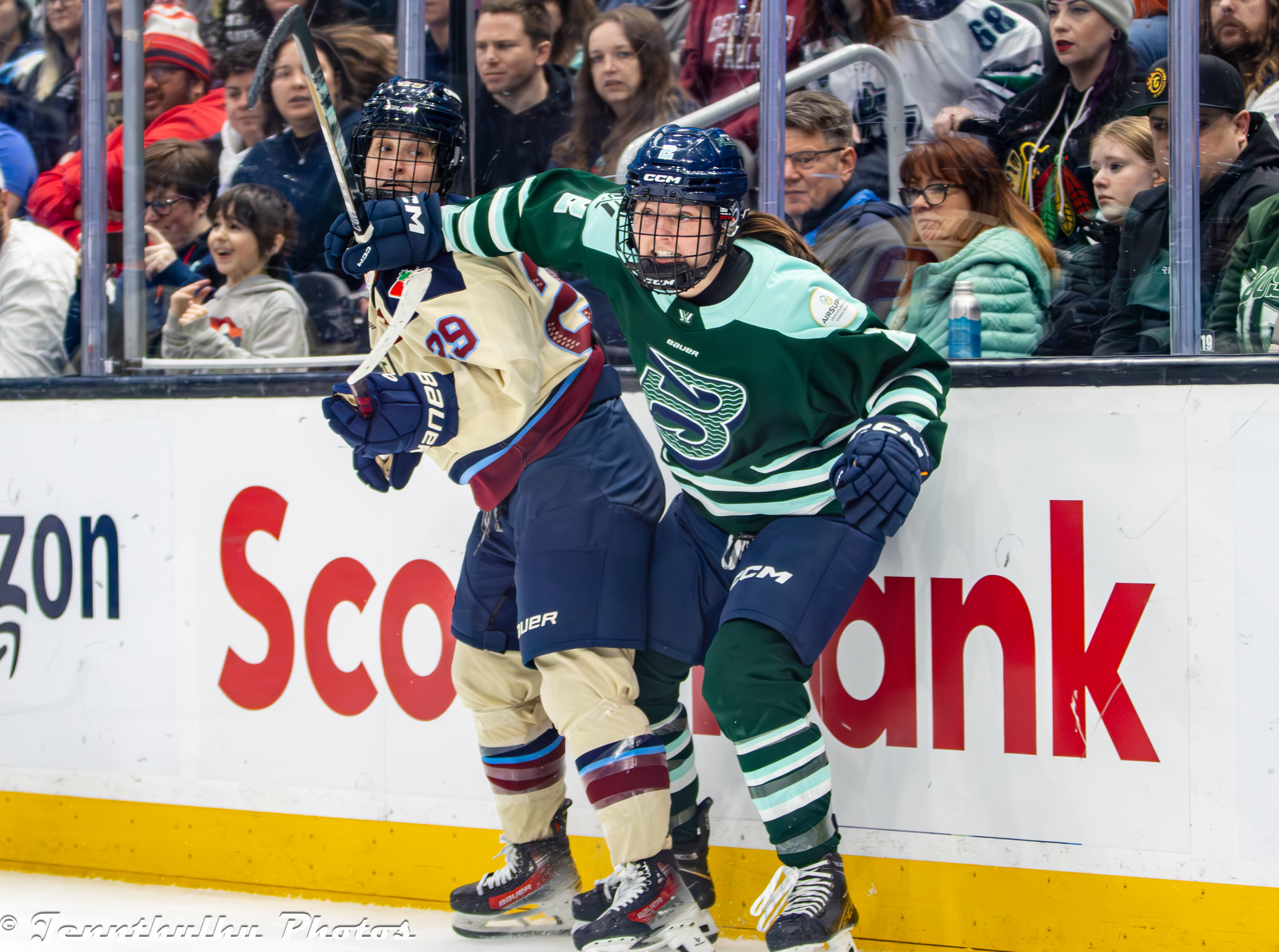
Brown (right) with the Boston Fleet in 2025

Following the creation of the Professional Women's Hockey League in 2023, Brown was drafted in the eighth round of the inaugural 2023 PWHL Draft by PWHL Boston, and was signed to a one-year contract that November. During the 2023–24 season she recorded one goal and three assists in 24 regular season games and two assists in eight playoff games during the Walter Cup. On June 20, 2024, she signed a two-year contract extension with Boston.

During the 2024-25 PWHL season, Brown established herself as a reliable defensive presence. She recorded one goal and one assist through the early portion of the season but maintained strong defensive metrics, including a team-leading 6.9 hits per 60 minutes among defenders while accumulating only four penalty minutes. Her physical style of play and ability to stay within legal contact limits made her an important part of the Fleet's defensive core. Through much of the 2024-25 season, she was the only Fleet defender with a positive plus-minus rating.

Head coach Courtney Kessel valued Brown's physical game and reliability on the blue line. Despite limited offensive production, Brown's stay-at-home defensive responsibilities were crucial to the team's penalty kill, which ranked second-best in the league at 88.9%.

==== Seattle Torrent (2025–present) ====
On June 9, 2025, Brown was selected 14th overall by the Seattle Torrent in the 2025 PWHL Expansion Draft. She was one of three players selected from the Boston Fleet in the expansion draft, alongside forwards Hannah Bilka and Jamie Lee Rattray. The selection reunited Brown with former Fleet captain Hilary Knight, who had been signed by Seattle during the exclusive signing window prior to the expansion draft.

On November 20, 2025, Brown was named one of two alternate captains for the Torrent's inaugural season, serving alongside Alex Carpenter under captain Hilary Knight. The announcement came just days before the team's first-ever game on November 22, 2025, against the Vancouver Goldeneyes. Seattle general manager Meghan Turner, who had previously worked with Brown during her tenure with the Boston Fleet, praised the selection, stating that Brown and Carpenter were "strong compliments to Hilary" and that the leadership trio would "establish the team culture and style of play" for Seattle. Turner specifically noted Brown's reputation as "one of the most hard-nosed shutdown defenders in the league" and highlighted her important role in the Fleet's Walter Cup finals appearance during the inaugural PWHL season.

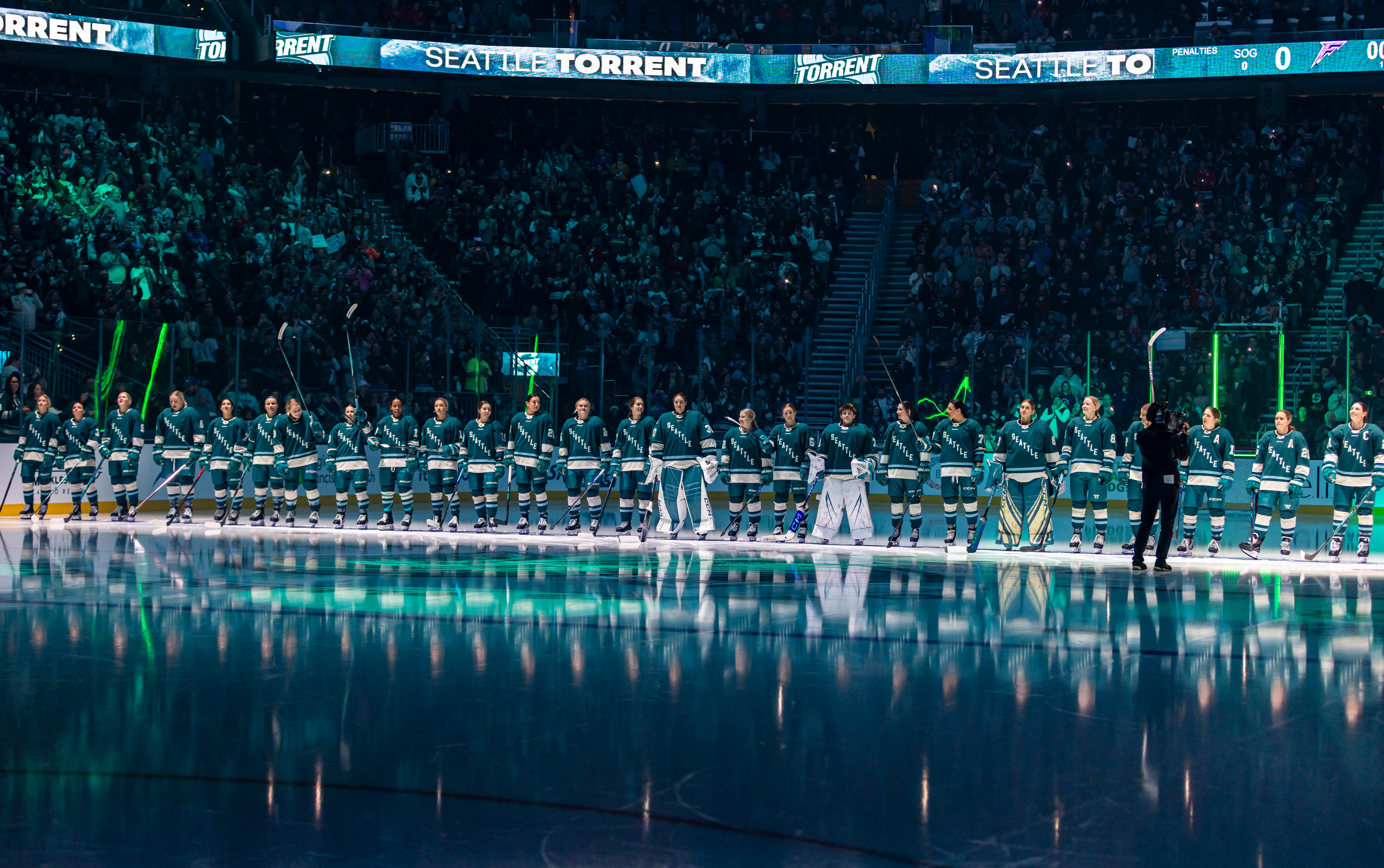
Brown (third from right) during the Torrent's record-breaking inaugural game at Climate Pledge Arena, November 24, 2025

The Torrent opened their inaugural 2025-26 Seattle Torrent season on November 22, 2025, against Vancouver in a sold-out game at Pacific Coliseum that drew 14,958 fans, though Seattle fell 4–3 in overtime. The team's home opener took place on November 28, 2025, at Climate Pledge Arena against the Minnesota Frost, setting a record for the largest crowd for a women's hockey game in a U.S. arena with 16,014 fans in attendance. Brown was part of a defensive corps that included fellow expansion draft selections Aneta Tejralová, Megan Carter, and Anna Wilgren, as well as Cayla Barnes, who was signed during the exclusive signing window. On January 20, 2026, Brown recorded an assist in Seattle's 6–4 victory over Toronto. The Torrent's six goals set a franchise record and matched the season high for any PWHL team.

== International play ==
Brown was a member of the United States national under-18 ice hockey team in 2015 and 2016, winning the gold medal in the 2016 IIHF U18 Women's World Championship. She also skated for the United States U-22 team in the 2019 series against Canada, and for the United States national team in the 2022–23 Rivalry Series.

Brown has represented the United States at multiple levels of international competition, including the under-18 team, U-22 team, and senior national team. Her international career has included a gold medal at the 2016 IIHF World Women's U18 Championship and appearances in the Rivalry Series against Canada.

=== Junior ===
Brown was selected to represent the United States national under-18 team in 2015 and 2016. Prior to the 2016 tournament, she competed in the Under-18 Three-Game Series between the United States and Canada in August 2015. She also attended USA Hockey Development Camps and the 2016 USA Hockey Women's National Festival.

Brown was part of the U.S. team that competed at the 2016 IIHF World Women's U18 Championship in St. Catharines, Ontario, held from January 8–15, 2016. The United States defeated Canada to win the gold medal at the 2016 tournament, continuing Team USA's dominance in the event. The gold medal was the fifth for the United States in nine tournaments, and the team has medaled in every IIHF U18 Women's World Championship since the event's inception in 2008.

In 2019, Brown was selected to compete for the United States U-22 team in a series against Canada. This series provided development opportunities for younger players to gain international experience while competing at the senior level.

=== Senior ===
Brown made her U.S. Women's National Team debut during the 2022–23 Rivalry Series against Canada. She was one of five players making their senior national team debut for the final two games of the series, held February 20 in Trois-Rivières, Quebec, and February 22 in Laval, Quebec. The roster included several other former University of Minnesota teammates, and both games were televised live on NHL Network. Brown returned to the national team for the 2023–24 Rivalry Series, appearing in games during February 2024. She joined fellow Boston Fleet players Hilary Knight, Taylor Girard, Megan Keller, and Aerin Frankel on the roster.

== Playing style ==
Brown's shutdown defensive style has defined her career. Her physical play combined with her ability to stay out of the penalty box made her a valuable asset, described as "exactly the kind of player every team needs, but whose importance is often overlooked." Analysts have noted that she was "one of those players who the less you notice her, the better she's playing," emphasizing her role as a steadying presence who allows offensive-minded defensive partners to take risks.

== Personal life ==
Outside of hockey, Brown pursued a career in mechanical engineering. During her college years, she completed internships that included work at Boston Scientific, where she contributed to process improvements and efficiency initiatives. She discussed in interviews how she balanced her engineering studies with her hockey career, noting the challenge of avoiding overthinking technical aspects like coefficient of friction while on the ice.

Brown is an out member of the LGBTQ community. In July 2026, she and Ashley Weber became engaged to be married. Ashley Weber is a recruiter with a business travel booking startup and attended University of Minnesota with Brown.

According to her USA Hockey profile, Brown's favorite food is raspberries.

== Career statistics ==
=== Regular season and playoffs ===
			Regular season					Playoffs
Season	Team	League	GP	G	A	Pts	PIM	GP	G	A	Pts	PIM
2013–14	Blaine Bengals	MNHS	25	4	17	21	10	3	0	2	2	0
2014–15	Blaine Bengals	MNHS	25	4	14	18	12	6	2	5	7	4
2015–16	Blaine Bengals	MNHS	21	6	22	28	12	2	0	2	2	2
2016–17	Blaine Bengals	MNHS	25	14	26	40	14	5	2	3	5	0
2017–18	University of Minnesota	WCHA	38	4	8	12	18	—	—	—	—	—
2018–19	University of Minnesota	WCHA	39	4	23	27	20	—	—	—	—	—
2019–20	University of Minnesota	WCHA	36	5	15	20	18	—	—	—	—	—
2020–21	University of Minnesota	WCHA	20	3	9	12	8	—	—	—	—	—
2021–22	University of Minnesota	WCHA	34	4	11	15	12	—	—	—	—	—
2022–23	Team Sonnet	PWHPA	20	0	1	1	12	—	—	—	—	—
2023–24	PWHL Boston	PWHL	24	1	3	4	12	8	0	2	2	0
2024–25	Boston Fleet	PWHL	29	1	3	4	16	—	—	—	—	—
2025–26	Seattle Torrent	PWHL	30	0	4	4	12	—	—	—	—	—
PWHPA totals			20	0	1	1	12	—	—	—	—	—
PWHL totals			83	2	10	12	40	8	0	2	2	0
