= Meghan Turner =

American ice hockey executive (born 1994)

Personal information
- Born: August 7, 1994 (age 31) Bedford, New Hampshire, US
- Education: Quinnipiac University
- Occupation: Ice hockey executive
- Employer: Seattle Torrent
Ice hockey career
- Height: 5 ft 7 in (170 cm)
- Position: Forward
- Shoots: Right
- Played for: Worcester Blades; PWHPA

Meghan Turner (born August 7, 1994) is an American ice hockey executive and former player. She has served as general manager for Seattle Torrent of the Professional Women's Hockey League (PWHL) since May 2025.

Turner previously served as assistant general manager for the Boston Fleet. During her career as a player, she was a forward for Quinnipiac University women's hockey from 2013 to 2017, a forward for the Worcester Blades in the Canadian Women's Hockey League and the PWHLPA.

== Early life and education ==
Turner was born in Bedford, New Hampshire. Turner attended Phillips Exeter Academy in Exeter, New Hampshire, where she played ice hockey, lacrosse, and cross country. She was the team captain in the 2012-13 season, and finished her three-year career at Exeter with 102 points.

Following high school, Turner attended Quinnipiac University and graduated magna cum laude with a bachelor's degree in International Business in 2016. Following high school, Turner attended Quinnipiac University and graduated magna cum laude with a bachelor's degree in International Business in 2016. She studied towards and graduated with a Master's of Business Administration in 2017. Following graduation, Turner worked at PricewaterhouseCoopers in Boston in the advisory practice.

== Playing career ==
Turner was a forward for the Quinnipiac Bobcats women's ice hockey from 2013 to 2017. She was a member of the historic 2015–16 team that won the ECAC Hockey championship and set the program's best win-loss record, at 30–3–5. She played in 112 games for Quinnipiac and finished her career with 24 goals and 15 assists for 39 points.

Turner played one season as forward for the Worcester Blades in the Canadian Women's Hockey League. She then played approximately four seasons in the Professional Women's Hockey Players Association before it folded in 2023.

== Career statistics ==
=== Regular season and playoffs ===
			Regular season
Season	Team	League	GP	G	A	Pts	PIM
2013–14	Quinnipiac University	ECAC	0	0	0	0	0
2014–15	Quinnipiac University	ECAC	38	4	1	5	8
2015–16	Quinnipiac University	ECAC	37	8	4	12	4
2016–17	Quinnipiac University	ECAC	37	12	10	22	26
2018–19	Worcester Blades	CWHL	21	0	2	2	6
NCAA totals			112	24	15	39	12
CWHL totals			21	0	2	2	6

== Executive career ==
Turner worked as assistant general manager for the Boston Fleet from its founding in 2024 to 2025, and later became the general manager for the Seattle Torrent.

== Awards and honors ==
During her tenure at Quinnipiac, Turner achieved several academic and athletic honors:

- ECAC All-Academic Team: Named to the Eastern College Athletic Conference All-Academic Team for two consecutive years
