= Lily Delianedis =

American ice hockey player (born 2001)

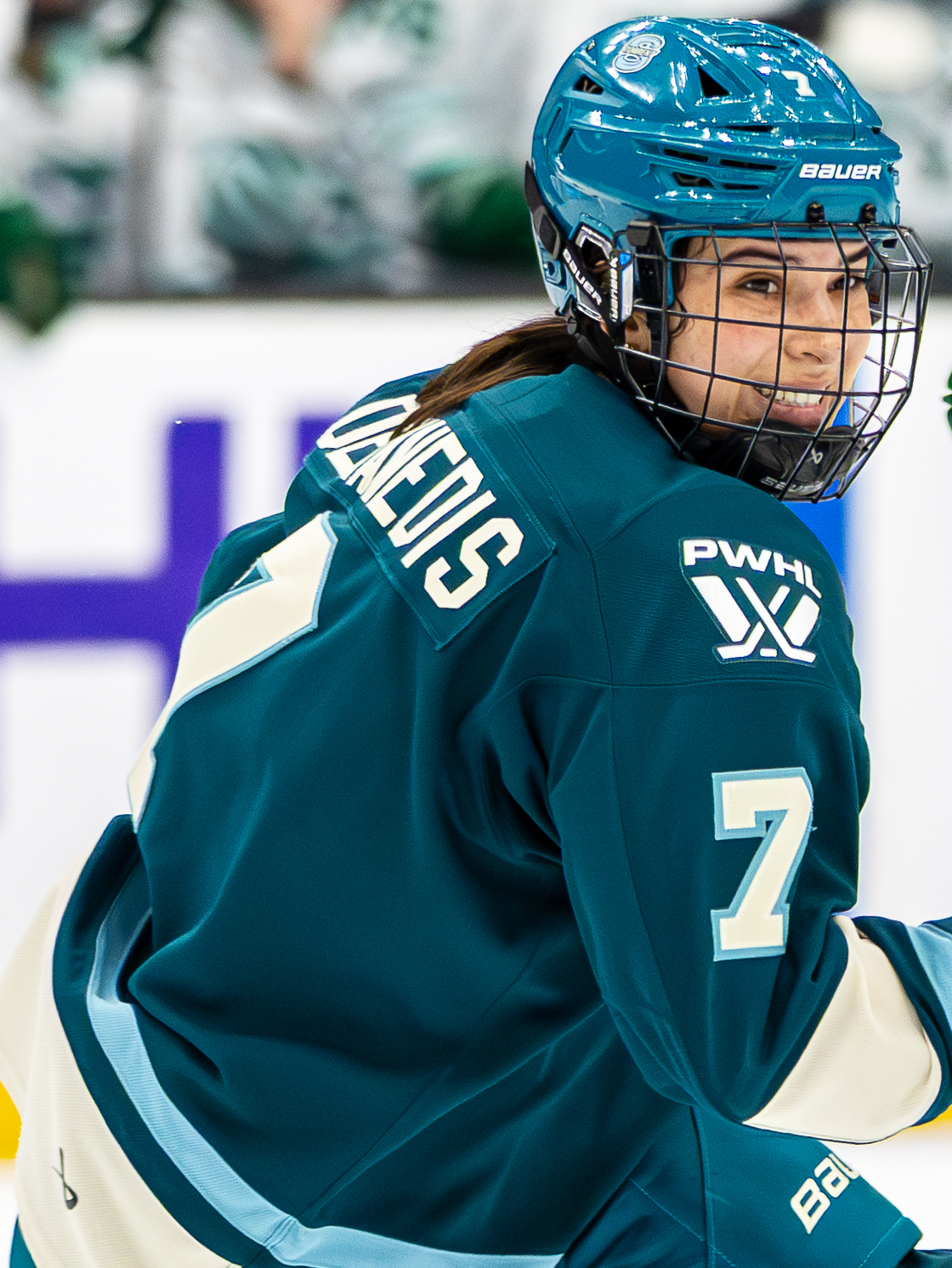
- Delianedis with the Seattle Torrent in 2026
- Born: October 7, 2001 (age 24) Edina, Minnesota, U.S.
- Height: 5 ft 4 in (163 cm)
- Position: Forward
- Shoots: Left
- PWHL team: Seattle Torrent

Lily Delianedis (del-ee-ə-NEE-dis; born October 7, 2001) is an American professional ice hockey forward for the Seattle Torrent of the Professional Women's Hockey League (PWHL). She played college ice hockey for the Cornell Big Red, where she was named ECAC Hockey Rookie of the Year in 2022.

== Early life ==
Delianedis was born on October 7, 2001, in Edina, Minnesota, to Dan and Christina Delianedis. She has an older sister. Her father played goaltender at Colgate University from 1982 to 1986 before embarking on a four-year professional career that included a stint in the New Jersey Devils system, playing in the American Hockey League and ECHL. He later became a goalie coach.

Delianedis attended The Blake School in Minneapolis, where she played for the school's girls' hockey team. She served as team captain during the 2019–20 season and was named team Most Valuable Player. During her high school career, she was a three-time All-Minnesota State selection (2019, 2020; Honorable Mention 2018) and a four-time all-conference selection (2017, 2018, 2019, 2020). She was a member of Blake's 2016 and 2017 Minnesota State High School League Championship teams and earned all-tournament honors in 2017. In 2020, she was named to the Star Tribune All-Metro First Team and was a finalist for the Ms. Hockey Award, Minnesota's best player award. She also played with the Minnesota Jr. Whitecaps, winning the North American Hockey Academy Tournament Championship in 2019.

== Playing career ==
=== College ===
Delianedis played four seasons for the Cornell Big Red women's ice hockey team from 2021 to 2025. During her freshman season in 2021–22, she recorded 27 points on 14 goals and 13 assists in 30 games. She was named ECAC Hockey Rookie of the Year and was selected to the ECAC Hockey All-Rookie Team. She was also named a finalist for the national Women's Rookie of the Year Award. As a sophomore in 2022–23, Delianedis played in 27 games and registered 27 points on 11 goals and 16 assists. In her junior season (2023–24), she helped lead Cornell to the NCAA Tournament for the first time since 2019.

During her senior season in 2024–25, Delianedis was named to the ECAC Women's Hockey Preseason All-League Team. She played in 35 games and recorded 22 points on 12 goals and 10 assists. Cornell advanced to the NCAA Frozen Four in Minneapolis, where Delianedis scored a goal in the semifinal game against Ohio State. The Big Red lost 4–2, ending their season.

=== Professional ===
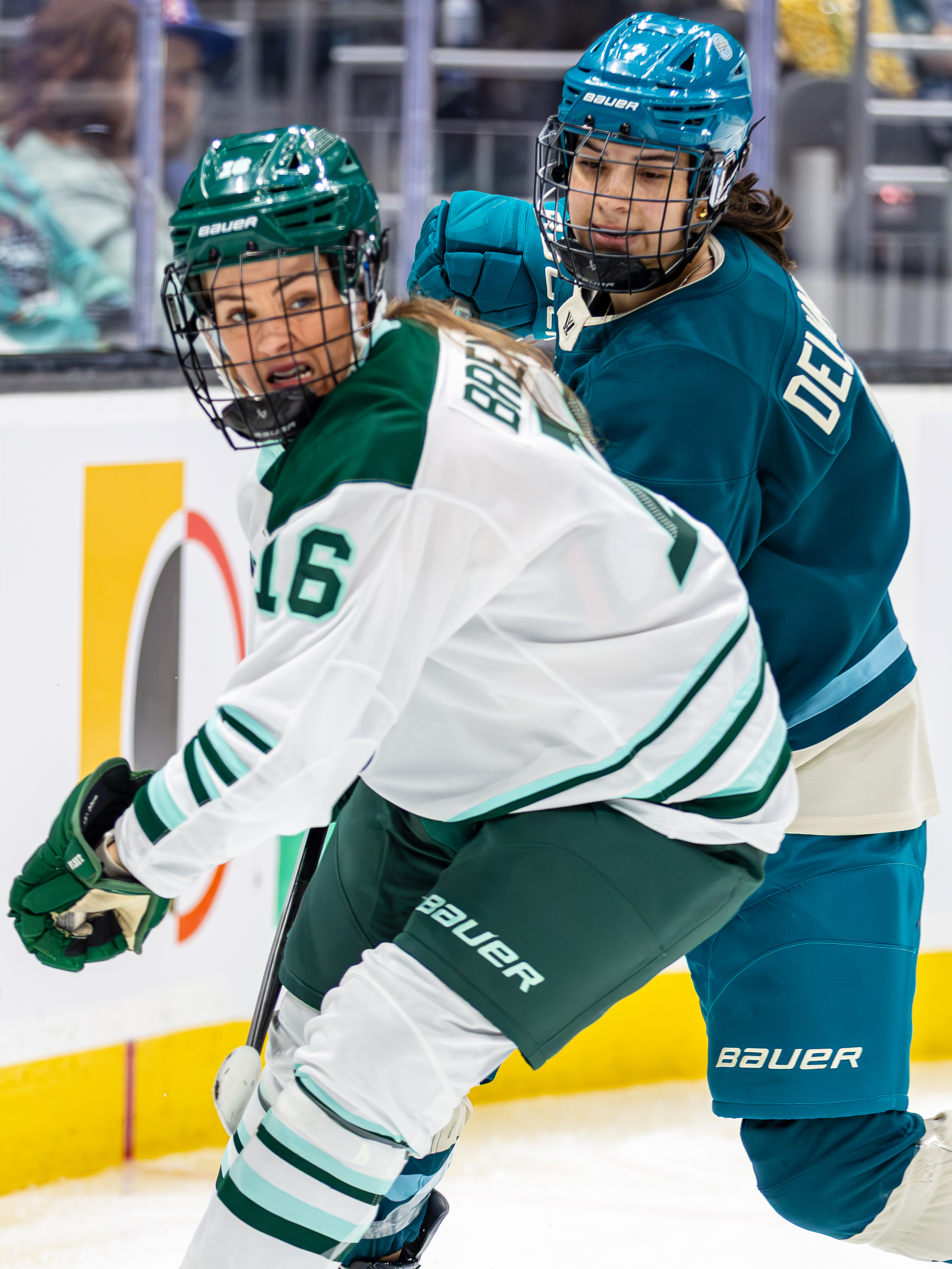
Delianedis (right) with the Seattle Torrent in 2026

==== Seattle Torrent (2025–present) ====
Delianedis was selected by the Seattle Torrent in the third round (24th overall) of the 2025 PWHL Draft. On November 20, 2025, she signed a one-year contract with the team. The Torrent's inaugural home opener on November 28, 2025, at Climate Pledge Arena set a United States attendance record for a women's professional hockey game with 16,014 fans. Delianedis made her PWHL debut on December 17, 2025, against the Ottawa Charge, registering 7:03 of ice time in a 4–1 victory. Head coach Steve O'Rourke praised her debut performance, noting she "did a great job just bringing the energy" and was "good on the forecheck."

== Career statistics ==
			Regular season					Playoffs
Season	Team	League	GP	G	A	Pts	PIM	GP	G	A	Pts	PIM
2021–22	Cornell	ECAC	30	14	13	27	28	—	—	—	—	—
2022–23	Cornell	ECAC	27	11	17	28	15	—	—	—	—	—
2023–24	Cornell	ECAC	34	16	18	34	20	—	—	—	—	—
2024–25	Cornell	ECAC	35	12	10	22	10	—	—	—	—	—
2025–26	Seattle Torrent	PWHL	24	0	2	2	6	—	—	—	—	—
PWHL totals			24	0	2	2	6	—	—	—	—	—

== Awards and honours ==
Honour	Year
College
ECAC Hockey Rookie of the Year	2022
ECAC Hockey All-Rookie Team	2022
Second Team All-Ivy	2024
Academic All-Ivy	2025
