= Sydney Langseth =

American ice hockey player (born 2002)

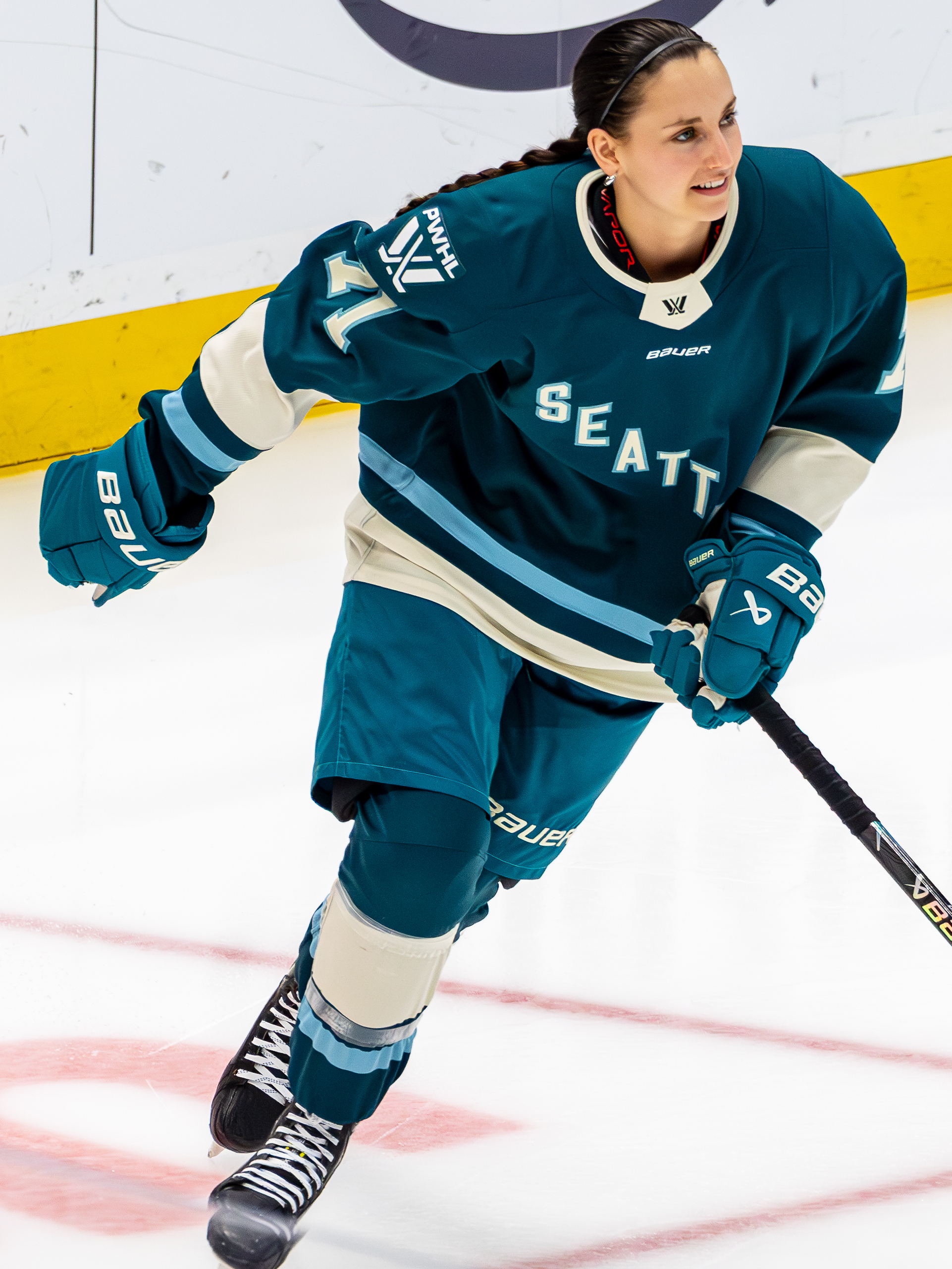
- Langseth with the Seattle Torrent in 2026
- Born: January 29, 2002 (age 24) Breckenridge, CO, USA
- Height: 5 ft 9 in (175 cm)
- Position: Forward
- Shoots: Right
- PWHL team Former teams: Vegas Vanguards; Seattle Torrent
- Playing career: 2025–present

Sydney Langseth (born January 29, 2002) is an American professional ice hockey forward for the Seattle Torrent of the Professional Women's Hockey League (PWHL). She played college ice hockey at Minnesota State University - Mankato.

== Playing career ==
=== High school ===
Langseth played for Eden Prairie High School for five years. She was a finalist for the 2020 Minnesota Ms. Hockey Award. She ranked third in Eden Prairie girls hockey history in points, goals and assists. She was also the high school Rookie of the Year, Offensive Player of the Year, and MVP. She received All-State and All-Conference honorable mentions.

She participated in the 2017 USA Hockey Girls Select 15 Player Development Camp, and the 2018 and 2019 USA Hockey Girls U-18 Select Player Development Camps.

While attending Eden Prairie, she played junior hockey for the U19 Minnesota Whitecaps and won the NAHA Tournament.

=== College ===
Langseth played her college hockey at Minnesota State University, Mankato. She holds the record for most games played, and finished sixth in MSU all-time scoring with 90 points, and sixth in goals with 36. She was named the team MVP in 2023–24. She was named captain of the Mavericks.

=== Professional ===
Langseth was invited to the Seattle Torrent's PWHL training camp prior to the 2025-26 PWHL season. Following training camp, she signed a reserve player contract. Following captain Hilary Knight's injury at the 2026 Winter Olympics, Langseth signed a Standard Player Agreement.

== Career statistics ==
			Regular season					Playoffs
Season	Team	League	GP	G	A	Pts	PIM	GP	G	A	Pts	PIM
2020–21	Minnesota State Mavericks	WCHA	18	4	3	7	2	—	—	—	—	—
2021–22	Minnesota State Mavericks	WCHA	35	6	11	17	0	—	—	—	—	—
2022–23	Minnesota State Mavericks	WCHA	34	7	10	17	21	—	—	—	—	—
2023–24	Minnesota State Mavericks	WCHA	38	15	17	32	13	—	—	—	—	—
2024–25	Minnesota State Mavericks	WCHA	37	4	13	17	2	—	—	—	—	—
2025–26	Seattle Torrent	PWHL	16	0	0	0	0	—	—	—	—	—
PWHL totals			16	0	0	0	0	—	—	—	—	—
