= Mariah Keopple =

American ice hockey player (born 2000)

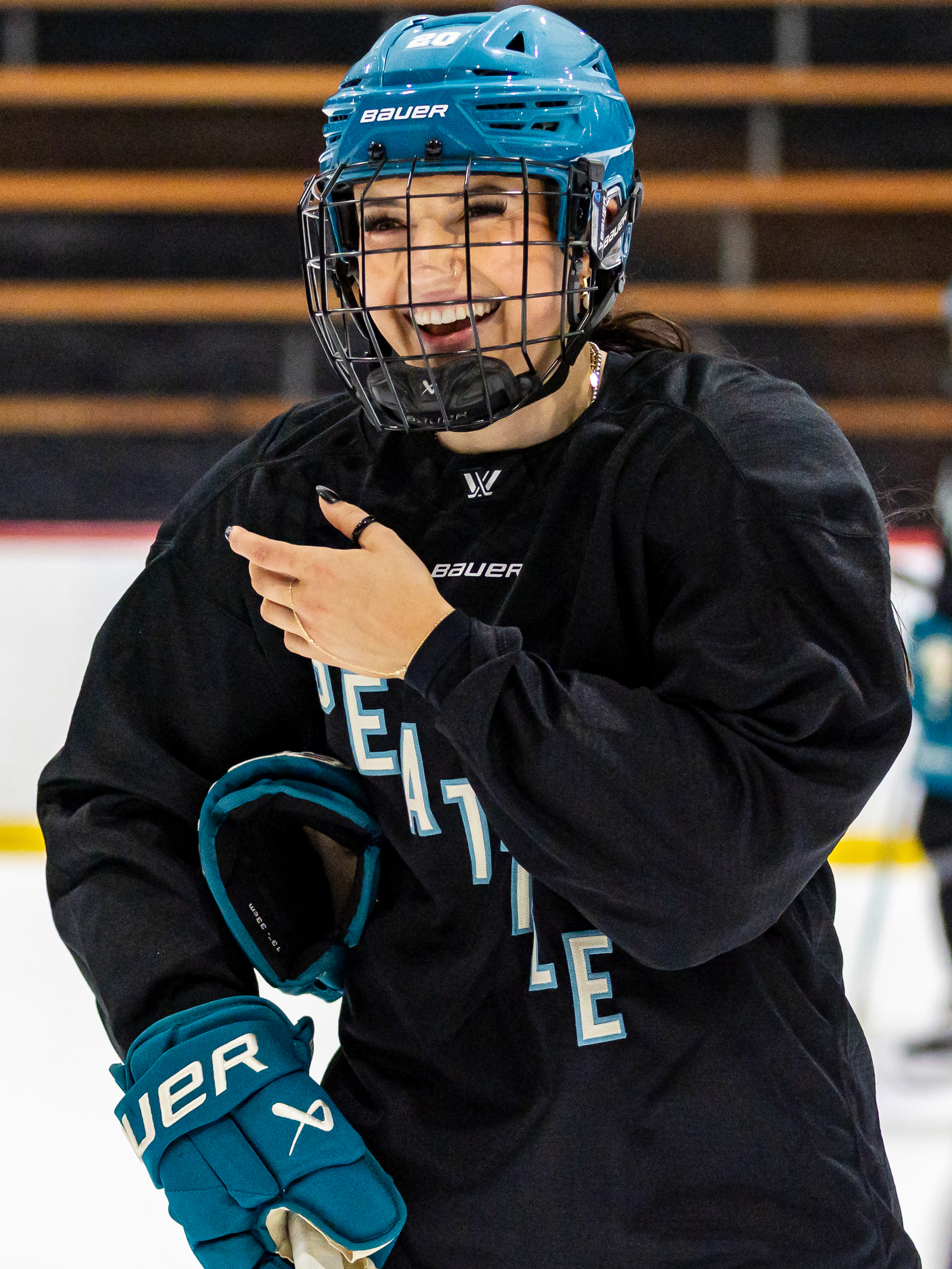
- Keopple with the Seattle Torrent in 2025
- Born: June 27, 2000 (age 26) Menomonie, Wisconsin, U.S.
- Height: 5 ft 9 in (175 cm)
- Position: Defence
- Shoots: Left
- PWHL team Former teams: San Jose Sea Lions; Montreal Victoire; Seattle Torrent
- Playing career: 2018–present

Mariah Maxine Keopple (born June 27, 2000) is an American professional ice hockey defenceman for the San Jose Sea Lions of the Professional Women's Hockey League (PWHL). She previously played for the Montreal Victoire and Seattle Torrent of the PWHL. She played college ice hockey at Princeton.

== Early life ==
Keopple was born to Aaron and Joy Keopple in Menomonie, Wisconsin, and has a younger brother, Remington. She grew up playing youth hockey on boys teams in Menomonie. Keople attended Hill-Murray School in Maplewood, Minnesota where she played four years of varsity hockey on the girls team. Hill-Murray qualified for the Minnesota State High School Hockey Tournament all four years and won the state championship during Keopple's freshman year. She served as team captain in her senior year and collected 74 career points.

During her youth hockey career, Keopple attended several USA Hockey Player Development camps and was invited to the Elite 66 Camp for USA Hockey in 2017. She also served as an alternate for the USA U18 Team.

== Playing career ==
=== College ===
Keopple began her collegiate career for Princeton during the 2018–19 season. She appeared in all 33 games as a freshman, recording three goals and 11 assists for 14 points. Keopple led all Tigers with 51 blocked shots and compiled a plus/minus ranking of +10. She recorded her first collegiate point in her NCAA debut against the Wisconsin Badgers, Frozen Four runner-ups from the previous season, when she and Sarah Fillier collaborated on assists for a third-period goal by Carly Bullock. The season culminated with an appearance in the NCAA tournament, where Keopple assisted on a second-period goal by Fillier against the Minnesota Golden Gophers. Following the season, she was named to the ECAC Hockey All-Rookie Team alongside teammates Maggie Connors and Fillier. She was also named to the ECAC All-Academic Team.

During the 2019–20 season, Keopple recorded five goals and 11 assists in 31 games. Princeton enjoyed a tremendous 26–6–1 season, setting a program record for wins. In the ECAC Tournament, sixth-ranked and second-seeded Princeton defeated Quinnipiac in a three-game quarterfinal series that required double overtime in the decisive third game. In the semifinals, Princeton defeated seventh-ranked Clarkson 5–1. In the championship game on March 8, 2020, Princeton faced top-ranked Cornell at Lynah Rink before a crowd of 1,495. Cornell scored two goals in the first 2:49 of the game to take a 2–0 lead. Princeton rallied with second-period goals by Fillier and Bullock to tie the game at 2–2. After a scoreless third period, the game went to overtime. Just 58 seconds into overtime, Keopple's shot from about six feet inside the blue line deflected off a Cornell defender and flipped over the left shoulder of All-America goaltender Lindsay Browning, settling in the net to give Princeton a 3–2 victory and the program's first ECAC championship in history. The win also snapped Cornell's 22-game unbeaten streak and marked the Big Red's first loss at Lynah that season. Princeton was scheduled to play Northeastern in the NCAA quarterfinals, but the tournament was cancelled due to the COVID-19 pandemic. Following the season, she was named to the ECAC All-Academic Team for the second consecutive year.

The Ivy League cancelled the 2020–21 season due to the COVID-19 pandemic. During the 2021–22 season, she recorded two goals and five assists in 31 games. Following the season, she was named to the All-Ivy League Second Team and the ECAC All-Academic Team.

During the 2022–23 season, Keopple served as an assistant captain. She recorded two goals and 13 assists for 15 points in 31 games, both goals coming against Rensselaer. She had a pair of two-assist games against Mercyhurst on December 9, 2022, and against fourth-ranked Quinnipiac on January 29, 2023. Keopple led the team with a +16 plus-minus rating, took 50 shots on the season, and blocked 37 shots. Following the season, she was named Honorable Mention All-Ivy League and to the ECAC All-Academic Team for the fourth time in her career. She finished her collegiate career having played in 126 games with 12 goals and 40 assists for 52 points.

=== Professional ===
==== Montréal Victoire (2023–2025) ====
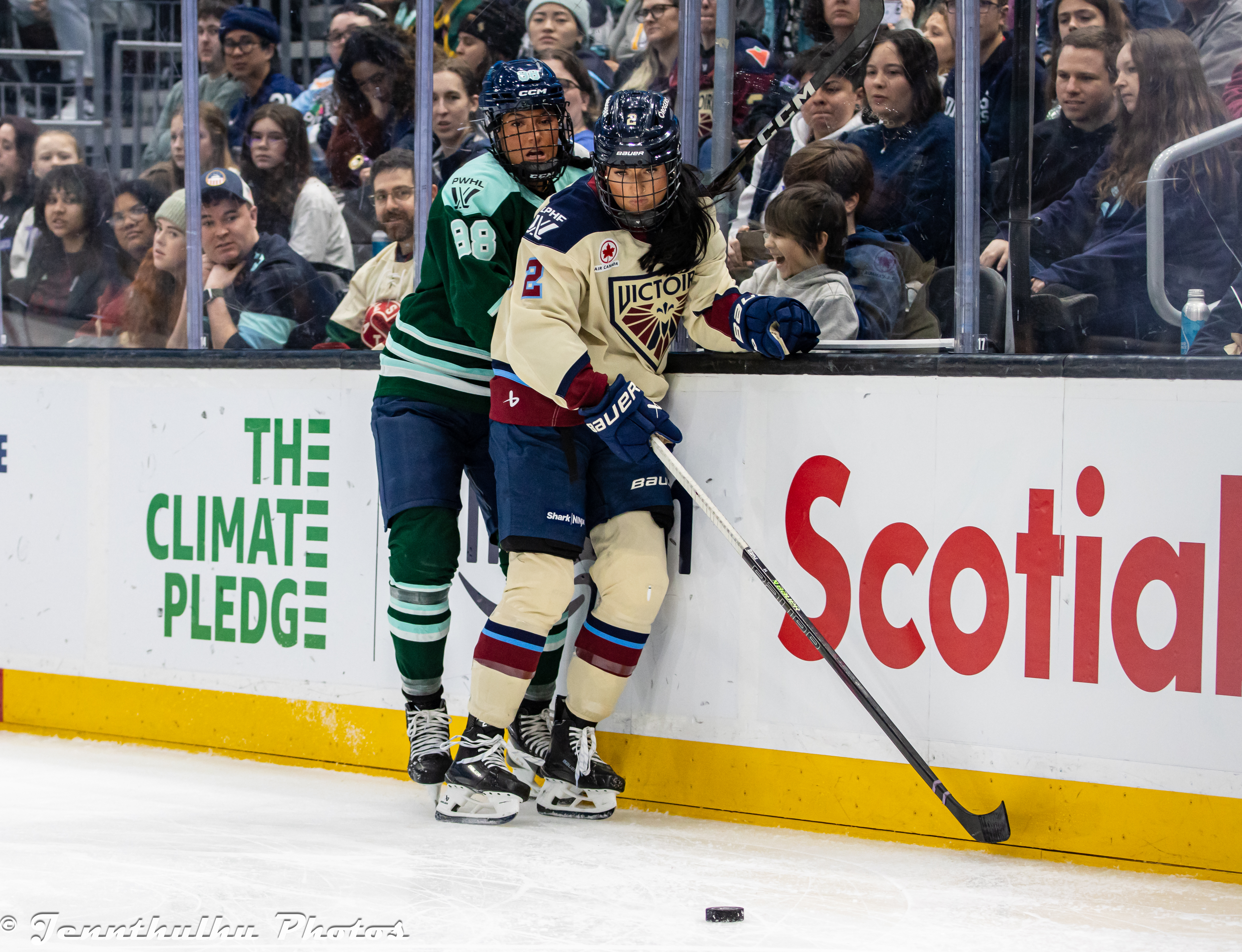
Keopple (right) playing for Montreal in January 2025

After going undrafted in the 2023 PWHL Draft, Keopple was invited to PWHL Montreal's training camp in mid-November 2023. She impressed at camp and signed a one-year contract with Montreal on November 21, 2023. During the 2023–24 season, she rose quickly through the depth chart. Listed as the seventh defender in the first game of the season, by the second week she was on a regular pairing, and by the third week she was on the top pairing with Erin Ambrose, the team's top defender. She was the only first-year professional defender on Montreal to play in every regular season game, appearing in all 24 contests and recording three assists.

On June 17, 2024, Keopple signed a one-year contract extension with Montreal, which had rebranded as the Montréal Victoire. General manager Danièle Sauvageau stated: "Mariah progressed so much in her rookie season, and she will only get better over the next years." During the 2024–25 season, she recorded three goals and one assist in 29 regular season games, and was scoreless in four games during the 2025 PWHL playoffs, as Montreal advanced to the semifinals.

==== Seattle Torrent (2025–2026) ====
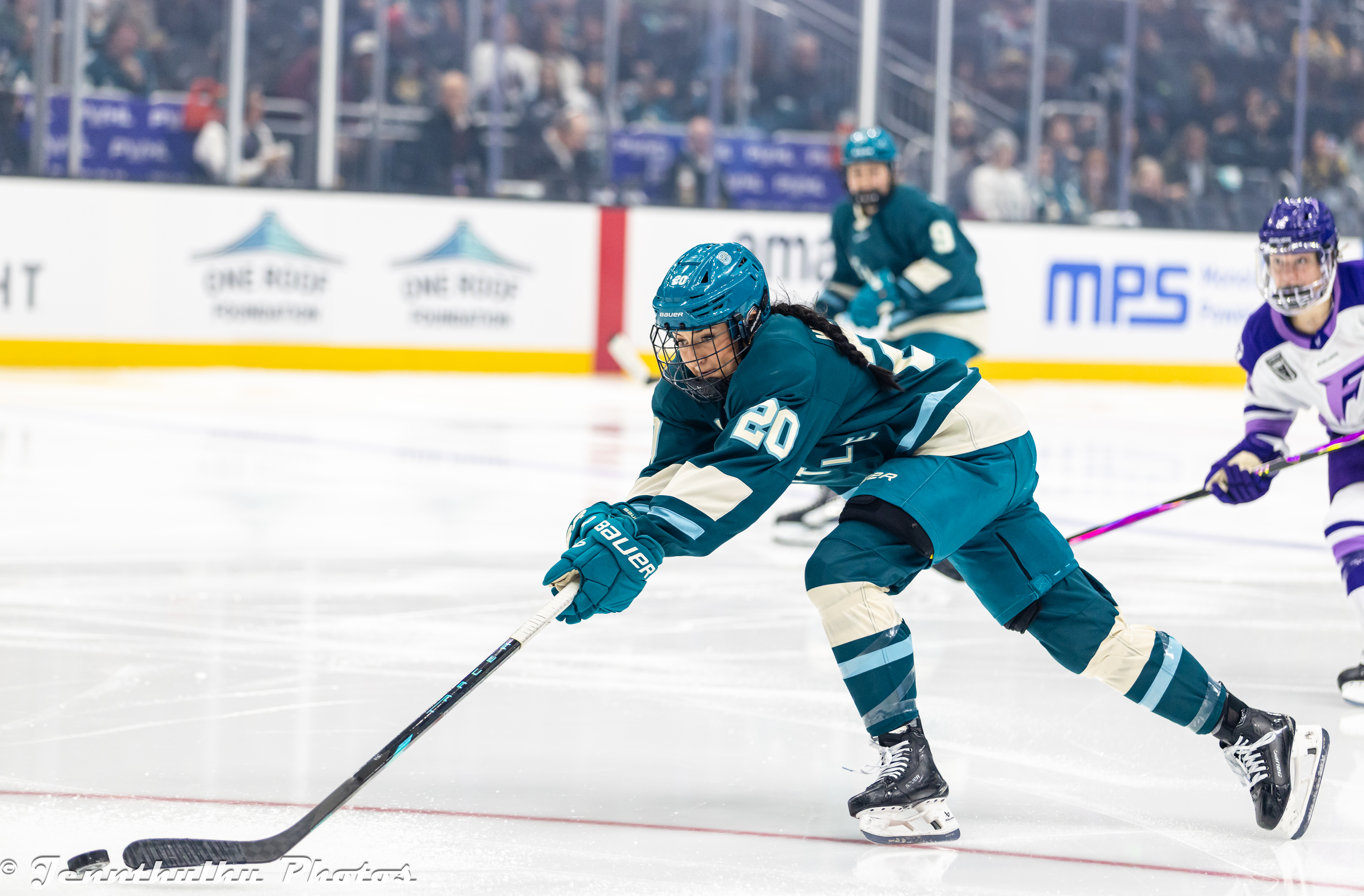
Keopple playing for the Torrent in November 2025

On June 17, 2025, Keopple signed a one-year contract with the expansion Seattle Torrent. General manager Meghan Turner said: "Mariah is a steady and reliable presence on the back end. She pays attention to the details, makes smart decisions under pressure, and brings the kind of shutdown ability we want in our defensive zone. She's exactly the type of defender we were looking to add."

She made her Torrent debut on November 21, 2025, in the franchise's first game, a 4–3 overtime loss to the Vancouver Goldeneyes before a sold-out crowd of 14,958 at the Pacific Coliseum. The sellout crowd set a new PWHL attendance record for a team's home arena. On November 28, 2025, the Torrent played their inaugural home opener at Climate Pledge Arena in front of a record-breaking crowd of 16,014 fans, setting multiple attendance benchmarks. The attendance established a new U.S. arena record for a women's hockey game, surpassing the previous record of 15,359 set at an NCAA game between the University of Wisconsin and St. Cloud State on January 14, 2017. It also topped the U.S. record for a professional women's hockey game of 14,288 set during the PWHL Takeover Tour in Detroit on March 16, 2025, and became the highest-attended primary home venue game in PWHL history. On January 20, 2026, Keopple recorded an assist in Seattle's 6–4 victory over Toronto. The Torrent's six goals set a franchise record and matched the season high for any PWHL team. During the 2025–26 season, she recorded three assists in 29 games.

==== San Jose Sea Lions (2026–present) ====
During the league's expansion to 12 teams ahead of the 2026–27 season, she signed a two-year contract with San Jose Sea Lions on June 12, 2026.

== Other work ==
Keopple has her own fashion line, Riah the Label. She designed clothes for Royalty Sports Performance, helping them become the official apparel partner for the PWHL, and also designs all of her own game-day outfits.

== Career statistics ==
			Regular season					Playoffs
Season	Team	League	GP	G	A	Pts	PIM	GP	G	A	Pts	PIM
2018–19	Princeton University	ECAC	33	3	11	14	14	—	—	—	—	—
2019–20	Princeton University	ECAC	31	5	11	16	12	—	—	—	—	—
2021–22	Princeton University	ECAC	31	2	5	7	12	—	—	—	—	—
2022–23	Princeton University	ECAC	31	2	13	15	18	—	—	—	—	—
2023–24	PWHL Montreal	PWHL	24	0	3	3	12	3	0	0	0	0
2024–25	Montreal Victoire	PWHL	29	3	1	4	14	4	0	0	0	4
2025–26	Seattle Torrent	PWHL	29	0	3	3	0	—	—	—	—	—
PWHL totals			82	3	7	10	26	7	0	0	0	4
