= Gabrielle David =

Canadian ice hockey player (born 1999)

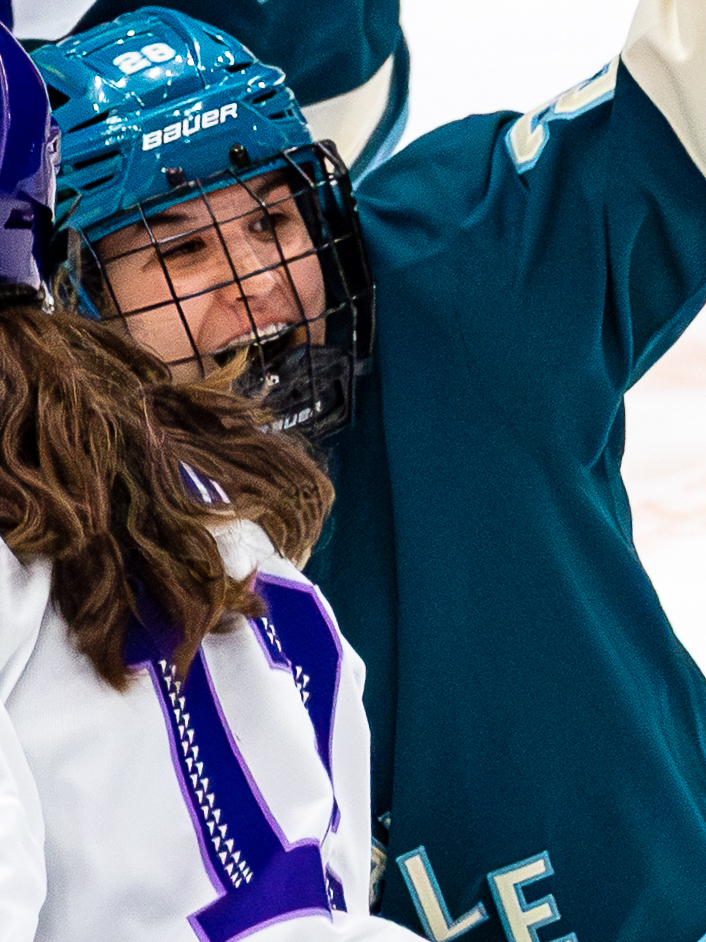
- David with the Seattle Torrent in 2026
- Born: June 22, 1999 (age 27) Drummondville, Quebec, Canada
- Height: 5 ft 4 in (163 cm)
- Weight: 126 lb (57 kg; 9 st 0 lb)
- Position: Forward
- Shoots: Right
- PWHL team Former teams: Seattle Torrent; Montreal Victoire; SDE Hockey
- Playing career: 2019–present

Gabrielle David (born June 22, 1999) is a Canadian professional ice hockey forward for the Seattle Torrent of the Professional Women's Hockey League (PWHL), she previously played for the Montreal Victoire of the PWHL and SDE Hockey of the Swedish Women's Hockey League (SDHL). She played college ice hockey at Clarkson.

== Playing career ==
=== College ===
David began her collegiate career for Clarkson during the 2019–20 season. During her freshman year, she recorded 14 goals and 24 assists in 37 games. She led all rookies in scoring with 38 points and was named ECAC Hockey's Rookie of the Year and USCHO.com Rookie of the Year.

During the 2020–21 season in her sophomore year, she recorded five goals and 15 assists in 19 games, in a season that was shortened due to the COVID-19 pandemic. She led the team in assists and ranked second in points with 20. During the 2021–22 season in her junior year, she recorded 18 goals and 21 assists in 37 games. During the 2022–23 season in her senior year, she recorded a career-high 21 goals and 31 assists in 42 games. She ranked tenth in the nation in scoring with 52 points and was named to the ECAC All-Third Team.

=== Professional ===
On May 19, 2023, David signed a one-year contract with the Boston Pride of the Premier Hockey Federation (PHF). The PHF ceased operations on June 29, 2023, as a result she never played a game for the Pride.

On September 18, 2023, David was drafted in the ninth round, 54th overall, by PWHL Montreal. On December 11, 2023, she signed a one-year contract with Montreal. During the 2023–24 season, she recorded two goals and four assists in 23 games. Following pre-season training camp, she was named to the reserve list for the 2024–25 season.

During the 2025–26 season she played for SDE Hockey of the SDHL. She recorded 19 goals and 23 assists in 35 games. She led the team in scoring and tied for second in the league with 42 points. During the playoffs she added six goals and three assists in eight games. On March 22, 2026, she signed with the Seattle Torrent of the PWHL for the remainder of the 2025–26 season, after placing Mikyla Grant-Mentis on the long-term injured reserve list. She finished the season with one goal and one assist in nine games. On June 20, 2026, she signed a two-year contract extension with the Torrent.

== Career statistics ==
=== Regular season and playoffs ===
			Regular season					Playoffs
Season	Team	League	GP	G	A	Pts	PIM	GP	G	A	Pts	PIM
2019–20	Clarkson University	ECAC	37	14	24	38	12	—	—	—	—	—
2020–21	Clarkson University	ECAC	19	5	15	20	8	—	—	—	—	—
2021–22	Clarkson University	ECAC	37	18	21	39	8	—	—	—	—	—
2022–23	Clarkson University	ECAC	42	21	31	52	14	—	—	—	—	—
2023–24	PWHL Montreal	PWHL	23	2	4	6	4	3	0	0	0	0
2024–25	Montreal Victoire	PWHL	3	0	0	0	0	—	—	—	—	—
2025–26	SDE Hockey	SDHL	35	19	23	42	10	8	6	3	9	4
2025–26	Seattle Torrent	PWHL	9	1	1	2	2	—	—	—	—	—
PWHL totals			35	3	5	8	6	3	0	0	0	0
SDHL totals			35	19	23	42	10	8	6	3	9	4

=== International ===
Year	Team	Event	Result	GP	G	A	Pts	PIM
2017	Canada	U18	2nd place, silver medalist(s)	5	0	1	1	0
Junior totals				5	0	1	1	0
