= Anna Wilgren =

American ice hockey player (born 1999)

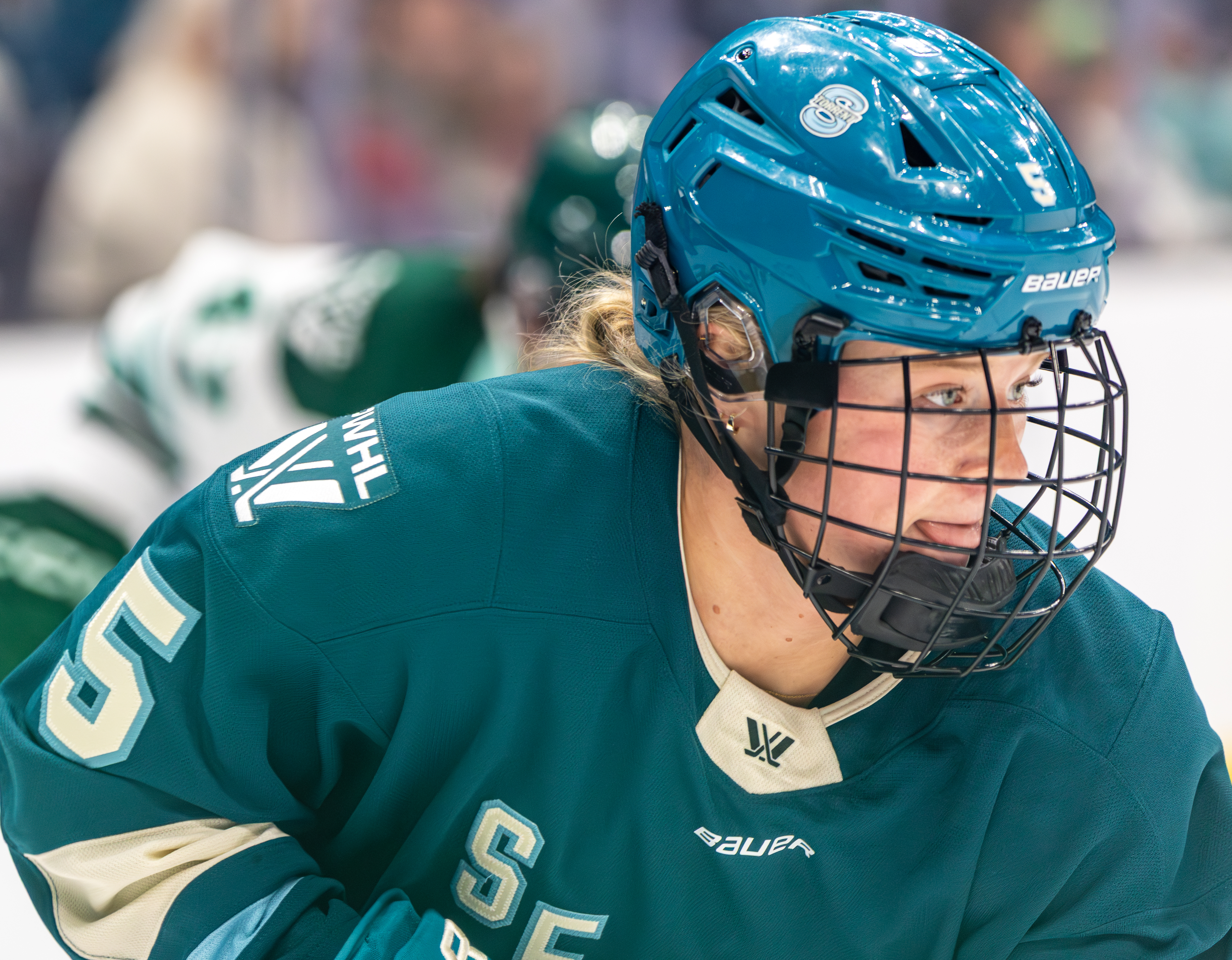
- Wilgren with the Seattle Torrent in 2026
- Born: November 18, 1999 (age 26) Saint Paul, Minnesota, U.S.
- Height: 5 ft 8 in (173 cm)
- Position: Defence
- Shoots: Left
- PWHL team Former teams: Seattle Torrent; Montreal Victoire
- Playing career: 2018–present
Medal record
World Championships
Gold medal – first place	2025 Czechia

Anna Wilgren (born November 18, 1999) is an American professional ice hockey defender for the Seattle Torrent of the Professional Women's Hockey League (PWHL) and the United States women's national ice hockey team. She previously played for the Montreal Victoire, where she earned PWHL All-Rookie Team honors. She played college ice hockey at Minnesota State, where she was a former team captain, and played her graduate season at Wisconsin, helping the Badgers reach the 2024 NCAA Championship final.

Wilgren was a two-time winner of the Molly Engstrom Award as Wisconsin's best defensive player during high school. She was invited to the 2022 U.S. Olympic Residency Program and made her senior national team debut at the 2025 IIHF Women's World Championship, winning a gold medal with Team USA.

== Early life ==
Wilgren was born to Wayne and Karyn Wilgren, in Saint Paul, Minnesota, and raised in Hudson, Wisconsin. She attended Hudson High School where she played ice hockey for four years. During the 2016–17 season, in her junior year, she recorded 64 goals and 20 assists, leading the state of Wisconsin in goals. She was named the Molly Engstrom Award winner in 2017 and 2018, as the best defensive player in the state of Wisconsin. She finished as the all-time leading scorer in Hudson program history. She also played tennis and ran track and field for three years. In 2018, Wilgren's senior season, the Hudson girls hockey team advanced to the WIAA state championship game, where they lost in overtime to Appleton. It was the program's first state tournament appearance since 2006.

== Playing career ==
=== College ===
Wilgren began her collegiate career for Minnesota State during the 2018–19 season. During her freshman year, she recorded four goals and eight assists in 35 games. She led the WCHA, and ranked second in the NCAA with 122 blocked shots. Following the season she was named to the WCHA All-Rookie Team. During the 2019–20 season in her sophomore year, she recorded six goals and 18 assists in 37 games. She led the team in scoring with 24 points, and led the WCHA with 96 blocked shots. Following the season, she was named to the All-WCHA Third Team.

During the 2020–21 season in her junior year, she recorded one goal and four assists in 16 games, in a season that was shortened due to the COVID-19 pandemic. She redshirted during the 2021–22 season, after being invited to the 2022 Olympic Residency Program in preparation for the 2022 Winter Olympics. During the 2022–23 season in her senior year, she recorded one goal in three games, before suffering a season-ending injury. She served as team captain her final three years at Minnesota State, finishing her career with 12 goals and 30 assists in 91 games.

On April 20, 2023, Wilgren announced she would transfer to Wisconsin for her final year of eligibility. She finished her career at Minnesota State with 12 goals and 30 assists in 91 games. During the 2023–24 season as a graduate student, she recorded two goals and 20 assists in 40 games, helping the Badgers reach the 2024 NCAA Championship final, where they lost 1–0 to Ohio State University.

=== Professional ===
==== Montreal Victoire (2024–25) ====
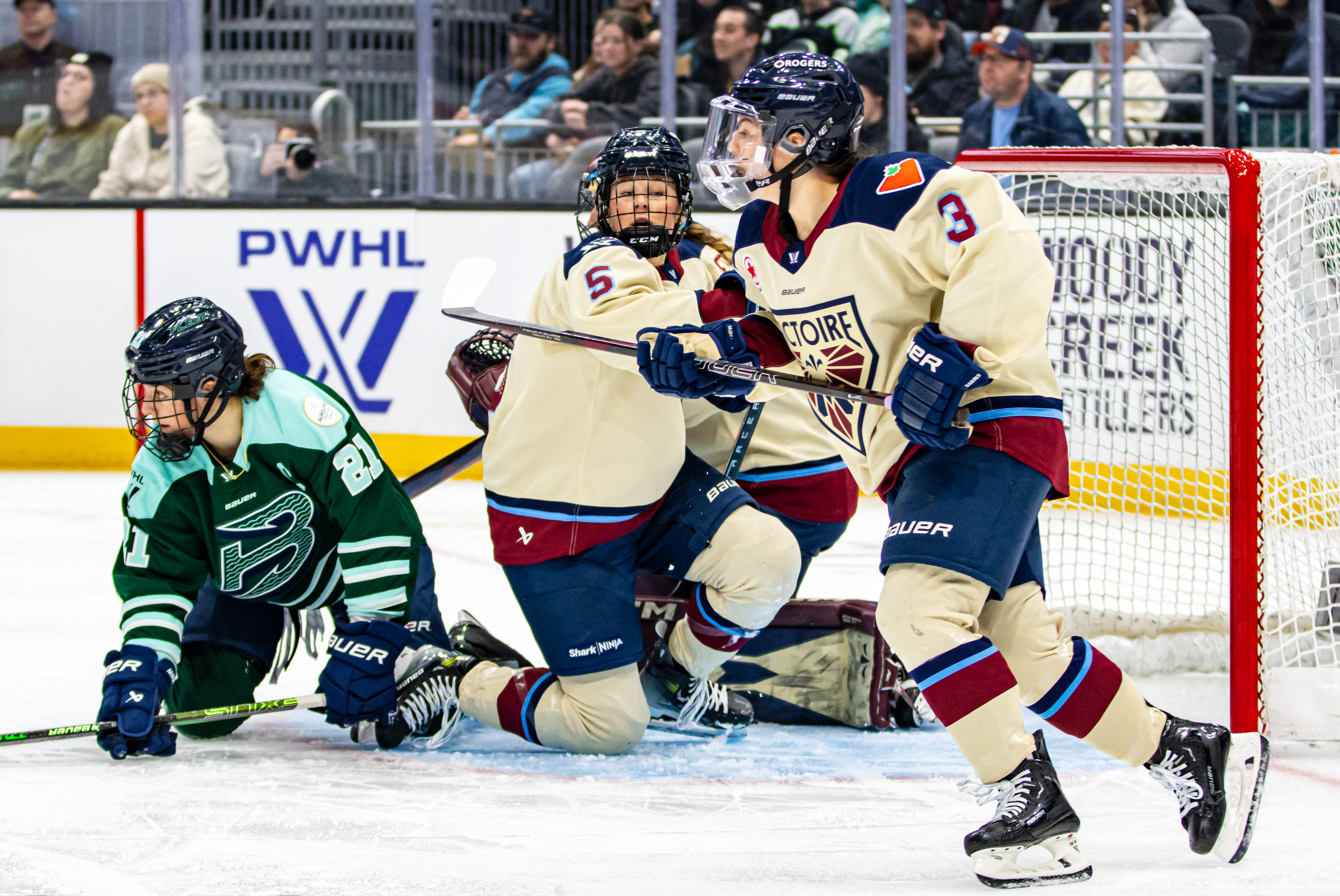
Wilgren (5) during the PWHL Takeover Tour game against the Boston Fleet at Climate Pledge Arena on January 5, 2025

On June 10, 2024, Wilgren was drafted in the fifth round, 29th overall, by PWHL Montreal in the 2024 PWHL Draft. In November 2024, she signed a standard contract with Montreal. During the 2024–25 season, in her rookie year, she appeared in 30 regular season games, and recorded three goals and six assists for nine points while demonstrating the shot-blocking ability that had defined her collegiate career. She quickly established herself as a reliable two-way defender, and earned PWHL All-Rookie Team honors alongside fellow defender Cayla Barnes.

Wilgren's contributions extended into the 2025 PWHL playoffs, where she added three assists during Montreal's series against the Ottawa Charge. On January 5, 2025, she competed with the Victoire at Climate Pledge Arena in Seattle during the PWHL Takeover Tour game against the Boston Fleet, foreshadowing her future move to the Pacific Northwest.

==== Seattle Torrent (2025–present) ====
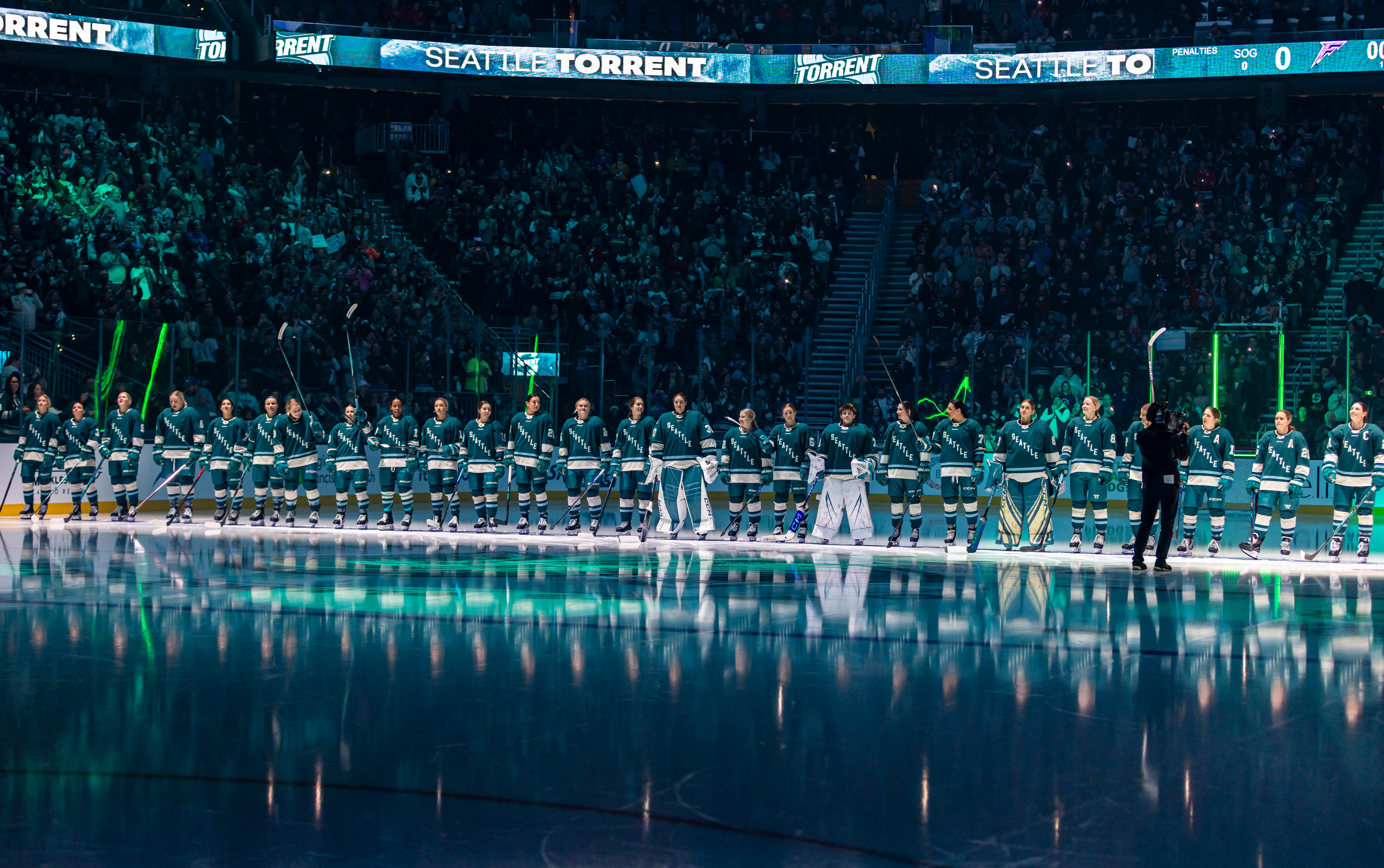
Wilgren with her Seattle Torrent teammates during the inaugural game at Climate Pledge Arena on November 28, 2025

On June 9, 2025, Wilgren was selected tenth overall by PWHL Seattle in the 2025 PWHL Expansion Draft. On July 10, 2025, she signed a one-year standard player agreement with the newly established franchise. Seattle General Manager Meghan Turner praised the acquisition, stating: "We're excited to have Anna representing Seattle this season. Anna made an immediate impact in her first year with strong defensive play and the ability to contribute to all zones. She's tough to play against and will be a great fit in our organization." Wilgren expressed enthusiasm about joining Seattle, saying: "I am so excited to be a part of bringing women's hockey to the West Coast. The energy that Seattle fans brought to last year's PWHL Takeover Tour was incredible."

The Torrent's inaugural home game on November 28, 2025, drew a record crowd of 16,014 fans at Climate Pledge Arena, breaking the U.S. attendance record for a women's hockey game. On December 3, 2025, in a game against the New York Sirens, Wilgren was checked from behind by Sirens rookie Kristýna Kaltounková, sending her face-first into the end boards with 3:59 remaining in regulation. The play resulted in a five-minute major penalty and game misconduct for Kaltounková. During the extended power play, Seattle scored two goals in 22 seconds, with Alex Carpenter tying the game at 1:24 remaining and captain Hilary Knight scoring the game-winner at 18:58 to secure the Torrent's first home victory, 2–1.

== International play ==
On March 5, 2025, Wilgren was selected to represent the United States at the 2025 IIHF Women's World Championship in České Budějovice, Czechia, where she made her senior national team debut. She made her World Championship debut during the tournament and contributed one assist in the United States' 5–0 victory over Switzerland in the preliminary round. Team USA went on to win the gold medal, defeating Canada 4–3 in overtime in the championship game on April 20, 2025. Wilgren became the first American-born Minnesota State alumna to represent the United States at the World Championship, joining former Mavericks Nina Tikkinen (Finland), Emilia Andersson (Sweden), Lena Düsterhöft (Germany), and Anna Fiegert (Germany) as Minnesota State alumni to compete in the tournament.

== Career statistics ==
=== Regular season and playoffs ===
			Regular season					Playoffs
Season	Team	League	GP	G	A	Pts	PIM	GP	G	A	Pts	PIM
2018–19	Minnesota State University	WCHA	35	4	8	12	12	—	—	—	—	—
2019–20	Minnesota State University	WCHA	37	6	18	24	12	—	—	—	—	—
2020–21	Minnesota State University	WCHA	16	1	4	5	14	—	—	—	—	—
2022–23	Minnesota State University	WCHA	3	1	0	1	2	—	—	—	—	—
2023–24	University of Wisconsin	WCHA	40	2	22	24	10	—	—	—	—	—
2024–25	Montreal Victoire	PWHL	30	3	6	9	8	4	0	3	3	0
2025–26	Seattle Torrent	PWHL	30	3	7	10	26	—	—	—	—	—
PWHL totals			60	6	13	19	34	4	0	3	3	0

=== International ===
Year	Team	Event	Result	GP	G	A	Pts	PIM
2025	United States	WC	1st place, gold medalist(s)	2	0	1	1	0
Senior totals				2	0	1	1	0

== Awards and honors ==
Honors	Year
PWHL
All-Rookie Team	2025
