= Megan Carter =

Canadian ice hockey player (born 2001)

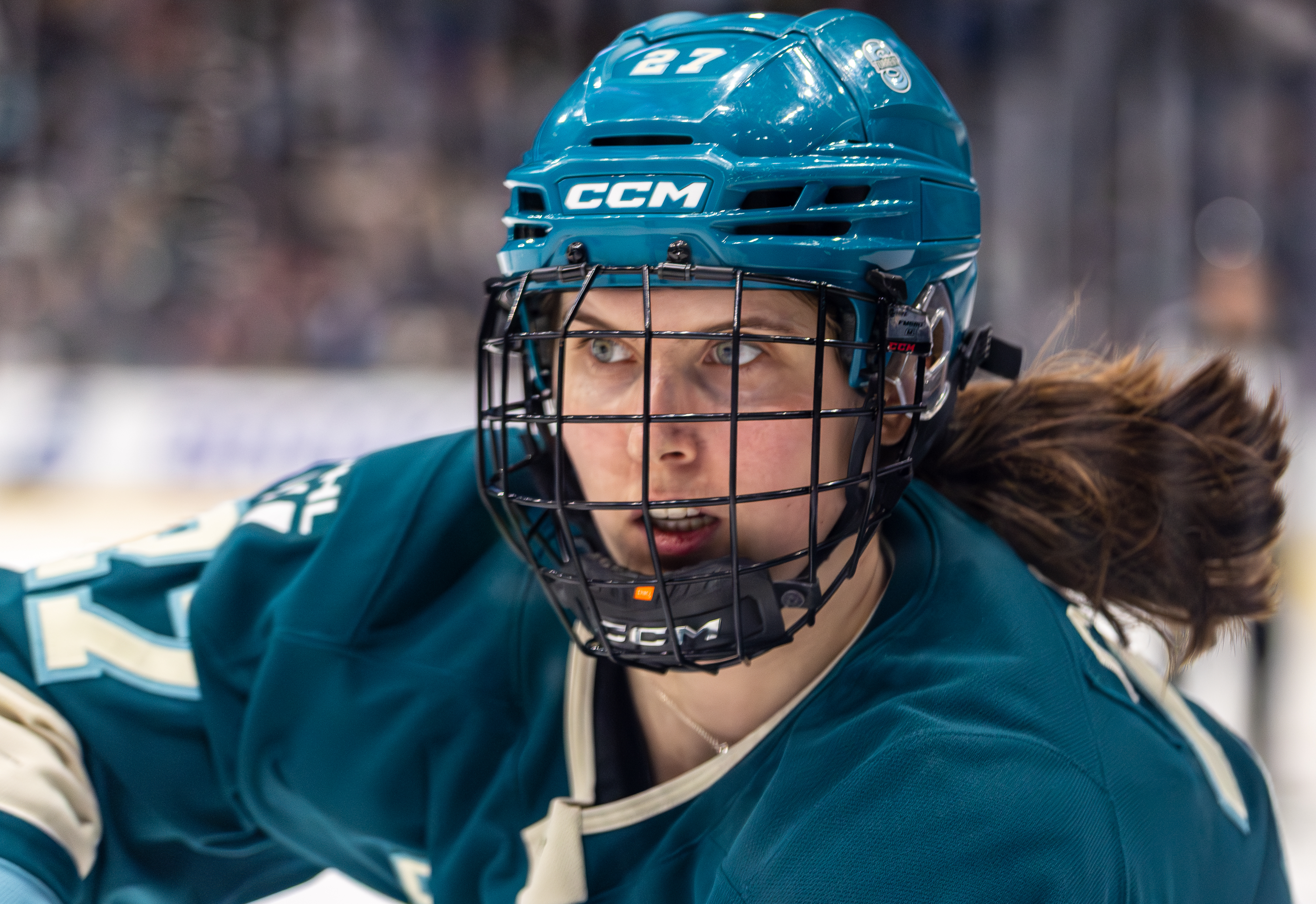
- Carter with the Seattle Torrent in 2026
- Born: May 23, 2001 (age 25) Milton, Ontario, Canada
- Height: 5 ft 8 in (173 cm)
- Position: Defence
- Shoots: Left
- PWHL team Former teams: Vegas Vanguards; Toronto Sceptres; Seattle Torrent
- Playing career: 2019–present

Megan Nicole Carter (born May 23, 2001) is a Canadian professional ice hockey defenceman for Vegas Vanguards in the Professional Women's Hockey League (PWHL). She previously played for the Seattle Torrent and the Toronto Sceptres of the PWHL. She played college ice hockey at Northeastern.

== Early life ==
Carter attended Craig Kielburger Secondary School, where she played field hockey and ultimate frisbee. She then played ice hockey for two seasons with the Stoney Creek Jr. Sabres of the Provincial Women's Hockey League.

== Playing career ==
=== College ===
Carter began her collegiate career for Northeastern during the 2019–20 season. During her freshman year, she recorded two goals and 11 assists in 38 games. Following the season she was named to the Hockey East All-Rookie Team. During the 2020–21 season in her sophomore year, she recorded five goals and seven assists in 25 games. During the 2021–22 season in her junior year, she recorded two goals and 12 assists in 38 games.

During the 2022–23 season in her senior year, she recorded five goals and 17 assists in 30 games, and ranked second on the team with 55 blocked shots. Following the season she was named to the All-Hockey East First Team and Co-Hockey East Defender of the Year. On May 9, 2023, she was named team captain for the 2023–24 season. As a graduate student, she recorded four goals and 21 assists in 34 games. Led all Hockey East defensemen with 25 points. Following the season she was named to the All-Hockey East First Team and Hockey East Defender of the Year for the second consecutive season.

=== Professional ===
==== Toronto Sceptres (2024–2025) ====
External videos
- Draftee Feature: Toronto's Megan Carter, PWHL retrieved December 24, 2025

On June 10, 2024, Carter was drafted in the second round, 12th overall, by PWHL Toronto in the 2024 PWHL Draft. On June 26, 2024, she signed a two-year contract with Toronto. Toronto general manager Gina Kingsbury praised Carter as "a great puck-moving D whose game is consistent and reliable," noting that she "doesn't shy away from playing a physical game."

On November 13, 2024, prior to the start of the regular season, she was placed on the long-term injured reserve list by the Toronto Sceptres with a lower-body injury. Carter was activated from long-term injured reserve on January 25, 2025, and made her PWHL debut that day against the New York Sirens in the Battle on Bay Street at Scotiabank Arena. During the 2024–25 season, she recorded one assist in 19 regular season games.

==== Seattle Torrent (2025–2026) ====
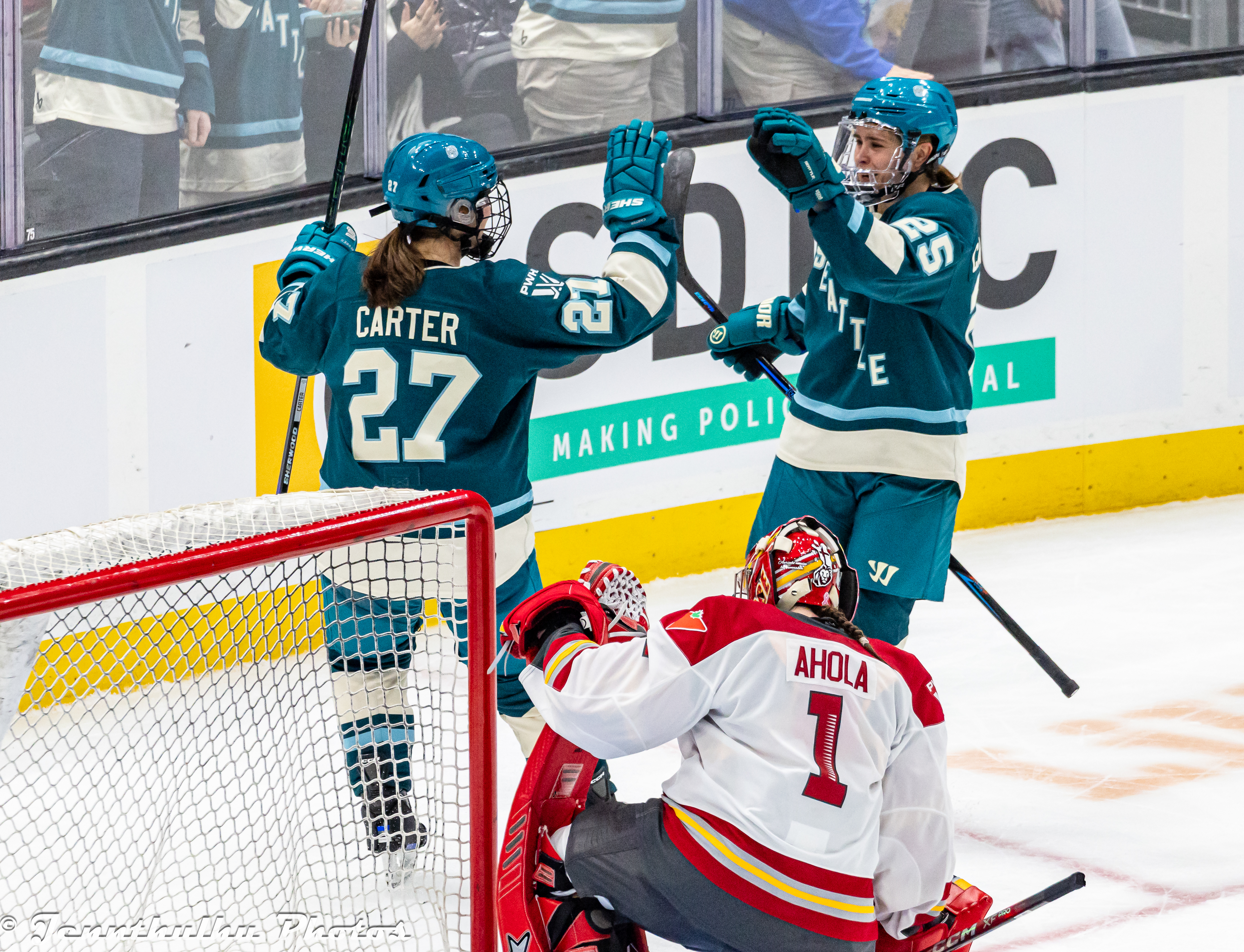
Carter celebrates an Alex Carpenter goal that she assisted on during a 4-1 win against the Ottawa Charge on December 17, 2025

On June 9, 2025, Carter was drafted 11th overall by PWHL Seattle in the 2025 PWHL Expansion Draft. She joined the Torrent for their inaugural 2025–26 season. She was part of Seattle's historic home opener on November 28, 2025, against the Minnesota Frost at Climate Pledge Arena, which drew 16,014 fans and set the record for the largest crowd for a women's hockey game in a U.S. arena. On December 17, 2025, she recorded her first point of the season with a primary assist on an Alex Carpenter goal in Seattle's 4-1 victory over the Ottawa Charge. On January 20, 2026, she scored her first career goal at 5:26 of the third period against her former team in Seattle's 6–4 victory over Toronto, in the highest-scoring game of the PWHL season. The goal, which stood as the game-winner, was the first scored by a Seattle defender in franchise history. The Torrent's six goals set a franchise record and matched the season high for any PWHL team. During the 2025–26 season, she recorded one goal and four assists in 30 games.

==== Vegas Vanguards (2026–present) ====
During the league's expansion to 12 teams ahead of the 2026–27 season, she was left by the Torrent and signed a two-year contract with Vegas Vanguards on June 10, 2026.

== International play ==
Medal record

Representing Canada

Ice hockey

World U18 Championships
Gold medal – first place	2019 Japan	

Carter represented Canada at the 2019 IIHF World Women's U18 Championship and won a gold medal.

== Personal life ==
Carter was born to Brad and Leanne Carter, and has two sisters, Lauren and Ashlyn. She graduated from Northeastern University with a bachelor's degree in biology. She then obtained a master's degree in human movement and rehabilitation science in 2024.

== Career statistics ==
=== Regular season and playoffs ===
			Regular season					Playoffs
Season	Team	League	GP	G	A	Pts	PIM	GP	G	A	Pts	PIM
2019–20	Northeastern University	HE	38	2	11	13	42	—	—	—	—	—
2020–21	Northeastern University	HE	25	5	7	12	18	—	—	—	—	—
2021–22	Northeastern University	HE	38	2	12	14	32	—	—	—	—	—
2022–23	Northeastern University	HE	30	5	17	22	20	—	—	—	—	—
2023–24	Northeastern University	HE	34	4	21	25	60	—	—	—	—	—
2024–25	Toronto Sceptres	PWHL	19	0	1	1	10	4	0	0	0	6
2025–26	Seattle Torrent	PWHL	30	1	4	5	26	—	—	—	—	—
PWHL totals			49	1	5	6	36	4	0	0	0	6

=== International ===
Year	Team	Event	Result	GP	G	A	Pts	PIM
2019	Canada	U18	1st place, gold medalist(s)	4	0	0	0	2
Junior totals				4	0	0	0	2

== Awards and honours ==
Honours	Year
College
All-Hockey East Rookie Team	2020
Hockey East Defender of the Year	2023, 2024
All-Hockey East First Team	2023, 2024
