= 2025–26 Minnesota Duluth Bulldogs women's ice hockey season =

2025–26 Minnesota Duluth women's ice hockey season
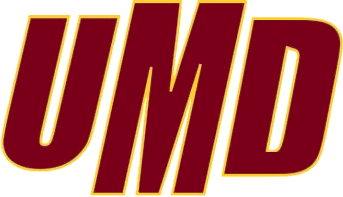
- Conference: WCHA
- Home ice: AMSOIL Arena

Rankings
- USA Today: #5
- USCHO.com: #5

Record
- Overall: 7–4–0
- Conference: 3–4–0
- Home: 3–2–0
- Road: 4–2–0

Coaches and captains
- Head coach: Laura Schuler
- Assistant coaches: Ashleigh Brykaliuk; Olivia Soares; Justin Grant
- Captain: Mary Kate O'Brien
- Alternate captain(s): Tova Henderson; Grace Sadura
- Minnesota Duluth Bulldogs women's ice hockey seasons « 2024–25 2026–27 »

The 2025–26 Minnesota Duluth Bulldogs women's ice hockey season will represent the University of Minnesota Duluth during the 2025–26 NCAA Division I women's ice hockey season. They will play their home games at AMSOIL Arena and are coached by Laura Schuler in her 2nd season.

== Offseason ==
=== Departing players ===
Player	Position	Class	Destintation
Hanna Baskin	Defense	Toronto Sceptres	
Brenna Fuhrman	Defense	Graduated	
Payton Holloway	Forward	Junior	St. Cloud State
Tindra Holm	Goaltender	Modo	
Nina Jobst-Smith	Defense	PWHL Vancouver	
Gabby Krause	Forward	Graduated	
Jenna Lawry	Forward	Graduated	
Reese Logan	Forward	Sophomore	Clarkson
Olivia Mobley	Forward	Boston Fleet	
Clara Van Wieren	Forward	Toronto Sceptres	
Olivia Wallin	Forward	PWHL Seattle	

=== Players Drafted ===
Professional Women's Hockey League
Round	Player	Position	Team
3	Olivia Mobley	Forward	Boston Fleet
3	Nina Jobst-Smith	Defense	PWHL Vancouver
3	Clara Van Wieren	Forward	Toronto Sceptres
6	Hanna Baskin	Defense	Toronto Sceptres
6	Olivia Wallin	Forward	PWHL Seattle

=== Incoming players ===
Player	Position	Class	Previous school
Madi Burr	Forward	Incoming freshman	
Molly Cole	Forward	Incoming freshman	
Thea Johansson	Forward	Senior	Mercyhurst
Kate Kosobud	Defense	Sophomore	Minnesota
Rae Mayer	Forward	Incoming freshman	
Ava MacLeod	Forward	Incoming freshman	
Ashley Messier	Defense	Graduate	Cornell
Linnea Natt och Dag	Defense	Incoming freshman	
Krista Parkkonen	Defense	Senior	Minnesota
Ella Pukala	Forward	Incoming freshman	
Josie St. Martin	Forward	Sophomore	Ohio State
Sophia Villanueva	Goaltender	Incoming freshman	
Ellie Zakrajsheck	Forward	Incoming freshman	

== Standings ==
2025–26 Western Collegiate Hockey Association standings
	Conference										Overall					
	GP	W	L	T	OTW	OTL	SOW	PTS	GF	GA	GP	W	L	T	GF	GA
#1 Wisconsin †	28	23	3	2	1	1	1	72	138	45	41	35	4	2	213	60
#2 Ohio State *	28	24	4	0	2	0	0	70	117	50	41	36	5	0	181	66
#5 Minnesota	28	18	9	1	1	2	1	57	115	70	39	26	12	1	173	86
#10 Minnesota Duluth	28	15	10	3	2	0	2	48	69	59	38	20	15	3	93	76
#13 Minnesota State	28	9	17	2	2	1	1	29	55	95	38	17	19	2	86	113
St. Cloud State	28	7	19	2	1	4	1	27	74	103	37	12	23	2	83	120
St. Thomas	28	7	20	1	3	5	0	24	49	95	36	12	23	1	81	117
Bemidji State	28	3	24	1	1	0	0	9	38	138	36	6	27	3	58	161
Championship: March 7, 2026 † indicates conference regular season champion; * indicates conference tournament champion Rankings: USCHO.com; updated March 23, 2026

== Roster ==
As of September 20, 2025.

No.	Nat.	Player	Class	Pos	Height	DoB	Hometown	Previous team
1	(Canada)	Éve Gascon	Junior	G	5' 8" (1.73 m)	2003-05-09	Terrebonne, Quebec	Saint-Laurent Patriotes (QCHL)
2	(United States)	Rae Mayer	Freshman	F	5' 8" (1.73 m)	2007-06-13	Chesapeake, Virginia	Bishop Kearney Selects
3	(United States)	Mary Kate O'Brien (C)	Senior (RS)	F	5' 4" (1.63 m)	2002-08-22	Wilbraham, Massachusetts	Bishop Kearney Selects
5	(United States)	Kate Kosobud	Sophomore	D	5' 8" (1.73 m)	2006-06-12	Moorhead, Minnesota	Minnesota
7	(United States)	Grace Sadura (A)	Junior	F	5' 7" (1.7 m)	2005-01-03	Minnetonka, Minnesota	Minnetonka High School
8	(United States)	Danielle Burgen	Senior	F	5' 6" (1.68 m)	2004-01-19	Lindstrom, Minnesota	Chisago Lakes High School
9	(United States)	Josie St.Martin	Sophomore	F	5' 4" (1.63 m)	2006-05-02	Stillwater, Minnesota	Ohio State
10	(Canada)	Ava MacLeod	Freshman	F	5' 7" (1.7 m)	2007-09-29	Kelowna, British Columbia	RINK Academy Kelowna
11	(Canada)	Caitlin Kraemer	Sophomore	F	5' 9" (1.75 m)	2006-05-29	Waterloo, Ontario	Waterloo Ravens U22 Elite
12	(United States)	Kamdyn Davis	Sophomore	D	5' 7" (1.7 m)	2006-08-12	Beloit, Wisconsin	Chicago Mission
13	(Canada)	Molly Cole	Freshman	F	5' 7" (1.7 m)	2007-12-28	Langley, British Columbia	Delta Hockey Academy U18
14	(Finland)	Krista Parkkonen	Senior	D	5' 6" (1.68 m)	2002-06-25	Lappeenranta, Finland	Minnesota
16	(United States)	Ellie Zakrajsheck	Freshman	F	5' 6" (1.68 m)	2006-11-03	Golden Valley, Minnesota	Minnetonka High School
17	(United States)	Ella Pukala	Freshman	F	5' 9" (1.75 m)	2007-01-02	Arlington Heights, Illinois	Chicago Mission
18	(Canada)	Madi Burr	Freshman	F	5' 9" (1.75 m)	2007-05-31	Paris, Ontario	Stoney Creek Sabres
19	(Canada)	Tova Henderson (A)	Senior	D	5' 8" (1.73 m)	2004-01-13	Richmond, British Columbia	Delta Hockey Academy
20	(Sweden)	Thea Johansson	Senior	F	5' 7" (1.7 m)	2002-02-22	Ljungby, Sweden	Mercyhurst
21	(United States)	Zoey Krock	Sophomore	F	5' 4" (1.63 m)	2006-02-18	Pittsburgh, Pennsylvania	Pittsburgh Penguins Elite
22	(Sweden)	Linnea Natt och Dag	Freshman	D	5' 8" (1.73 m)	2006-04-25	Stockholm, Sweden	Sweden U-18
23	(Canada)	Ashley Messier	Graduate	D	5' 3" (1.6 m)	2002-03-27	Wilcox, Saskatchewan	Cornell
24	(Sweden)	Ida Karlsson	Junior	D	5' 9" (1.75 m)	2004-06-30	Avesta, Sweden	Leksands IF
26	(Canada)	Devyn Millwater	Senior (RS)	D	5' 7" (1.7 m)	2002-08-19	Victoria, British Columbia	St. Cloud State
30	(United States)	Sophia Villanueva	Freshman	G	5' 7" (1.7 m)	2005-00-00	El Paso, Texas	Connecticut Jr. Rangers
31	(United States)	Anna Byczek	Freshman (RS)	G	5' 9" (1.75 m)	2004-00-00	Marquette, Michigan	Bay Area Ice Bears

== Schedule and results ==
Date	Time	Opponent^{#}	Rank^{#}	Site	Decision	Result	Attendance	Record	Ref
Regular Season
September 19	5:00 PM	at Mercyhurst*	#6	Mercyhurst Ice Center • Erie, PA	Gascon	W 4–3 ^{OT}	1,123	1–0–0	
September 20	12:00 PM	at Mercyhurst*	#6	Mercyhurst Ice Center • Erie, PA	Gascon	W 5–3	876	2–0–0	
September 25	5:00 PM	at Syracuse*	#6	Tennity Ice Pavilion • Syracuse, NY	Gascon	W 4–0	244	3–0–0	
September 26	5:00 PM	at Syracuse*	#6	Tennity Ice Pavilion • Syracuse, NY	Gascon	W 4–0	251	4–0–0	
October 11	11:00 AM	at #1 Wisconsin	#4	LaBahn Arena • Madison, WI	Gascon	L 3–4	2,273	4–1–0 (0–1–0)	
October 12	1:00 PM	at #1 Wisconsin	#4	LaBahn Arena • Madison, WI	Gascon	L 0–4	2,273	4–2–0 (0–2–0)	
October 17	6:02 PM	Minnesota State	#4	AMSOIL Arena • Duluth, MN	Gascon	W 5–0	1,193	5–2–0 (1–2–0)	
October 18	2:02 PM	Minnesota State	#4	AMSOIL Arena • Duluth, MN	Gascon	W 3–1	1,028	6–2–0 (2–2–0)	
October 24	6:02 PM	#3 Minnesota	#4	AMSOIL Arena • Duluth, MN	Gascon	L 0–4	981	6–3–0 (2–3–0)	
October 25	2:02 PM	#3 Minnesota	#4	AMSOIL Arena • Duluth, MN	Gascon	L 2–3	1,075	6–4–0 (2–4–0)	
October 31	2:00 PM	at #11 St. Cloud State	#5	Herb Brooks National Hockey Center • St. Cloud, MN	Villanueva	W 5–3	227	7–4–0 (3–4–0)	
November 1	1:00 PM	at #11 St. Cloud State	#5	Herb Brooks National Hockey Center • St. Cloud, MN	Villanueva	W 3–2	287	8–4–0 (4–4–0)	
November 14	5:00 PM	at #5 St. Thomas	#15	Lee & Penny Anderson Arena • St. Paul, MN	Gascon	W 3–1	709	9–4–0 (5–4–0)	
November 15	2:00 PM	at #15 St. Thomas	#5	Lee & Penny Anderson Arena • St. Paul, MN	Gascon	W 4–2	857	10–4–0 (6–4–0)	
November 21	6:02 PM	#3 Ohio State	#5	AMSOIL Arena • Duluth, MN	Gascon	L 1–3	1,056	10–5–0 (6–5–0)	
November 22	3:02 PM	#3 Ohio State	#5	AMSOIL Arena • Duluth, MN	Cascon	L 1–4	1,327	10–6–0 (6–6–0)	
December 5	6:02 PM	at Bemidji State	#5	Sanford Center • Bemidji, MN	Gascon	W 4–1	371	11–6–0 (7–6–0)	
December 6	3:02 PM	at Bemidji State	#5	Sanford Center • Bemidji, MN	Gascon	W 4–0	407	12–6–0 (8–6–0)	
January 2	2:00 PM	vs. Harvard*	#5	SSE Arena, Belfast • Belfast, Northern Ireland (Friendship Four)	Gascon	L 2–3	X	12–7–0	
January 3	10:00 AM	vs. #8 Quinnipiac*	#5	SSE Arena, Belfast • Belfast, Northern Ireland (Friendship Four)	Villanueva	L 1–3	X	12–8–0	
January 9	3:02 PM	#1 Wisconsin	#8	AMSOIL Arena • Duluth, MN	Gascon	T 1–1 ^{SOW}	1,795	12–8–1 (8–6–1)	
January 10	2:02 PM	#1 Wisconsin	#8	AMSOIL Arena • Duluth, MN	Gascon	L 1–5	1,807	12–9–1 (8–7–1)	
January 16	6:02 PM	#15 St. Cloud State	#8	AMSOIL Arena • Duluth, MN	Gascon	T 2–2 ^{SOL}	1,134	12–9–2 (8–7–2)	
January 17	3:02 PM	#15 St. Cloud State	#8	AMSOIL Arena • Duluth, MN	Gascon	L 2–5	1,139	12–10–2 (8–8–2)	
January 23	6:02 PM	at #13 Minnesota State	#9	Mayo Clinic Health System Event Center • Mankato, MN	Gascon	T 0–0 ^{SOW}	X	12–10–3 (8–8–3)	
January 24	2:02 PM	at #13 Minnesota State	#9	Mayo Clinic Health System Event Center • Mankato, MN	Gascon	W 5–0	392	13–10–3 (9–8–3)	
January 30	5:00 PM	at #2 Ohio State	#9	Ohio State University Ice Rink • Columbus, OH	Gascon	L 2–6	696	13–11–3 (9–9–3)	
January 31	2:00 PM	at #2 Ohio State	#9	Ohio State University Ice Rink • Columbus, OH	Gascon	L 1–3	654	13–12–3 (9–10–3)	
February 6	3:02 PM	Bemidji State	#10	AMSOIL Arena • Duluth, MN	Gascon	W 3–2	946	14–12–3 (10–10–3)	
February 7	2:02 PM	Bemidji State	#10	AMSOIL Arena • Duluth, MN	Gascon	W 5–0	1,438	15–12–3 (11–10–3)	
February 13	6:02 PM	St. Thomas	#10	AMSOIL Arena • Duluth, MN	Gascon	W 3–0	1,511	16–12–3 (12–10–3)	
February 14	3:02 PM	St. Thomas	#10	AMSOIL Arena • Duluth, MN	Gascon	W 3–0	1,059	17–12–3 (13–10–3)	
February 20	6:00 PM	at #3 Minnesota	#10	Ridder Arena • Minneapolis, MN	Gascon	W 3–2 ^{OT}	1,862	18–12–3 (14–10–3)	
February 21	2:00 PM	at #3 Minnesota	#10	Ridder Arena • Minneapolis, MN	Gascon	W 2–1 ^{OT}	2,315	19–12–3 (15–10–3)	
WCHA Tournament
February 27	2:00 PM	#14 Minnesota State	#9	AMSOIL Arena • Duluth, MN (Quarterfinals)	Gascon	W 2–0	408	20–12–3	
February 28	1:00 PM	#14 Minnesota State	#9	AMSOIL Arena • Duluth, MN (Quarterfinals)	Gascon	L 1–2 ^{2OT}	548	20–13–3	
March 1	1:00 PM	#14 Minnesota State	#9	AMSOIL Arena • Duluth, MN (Quarterfinals)	Gascon	L 1–2	428	20–14–3	
NCAA Tournament
March 12	6:00 PM	vs. #8 Yale*	#10	Ohio State University Ice Rink • Columbus, OH (First Round)	Gascon	L 0–1	285	20–15–3	
*Non-conference game. ^{#}Rankings from USCHO.com Poll. All times are in Central Time. Source:

== Awards ==
- Ève Gascon: WCHA Goaltender of the Week (September 29, 2025)
- Gascon: WCHA Goaltender of the Week (October 20, 2025)
- Rae Mayer: WCHA Rookie of the Week (October 20, 2025)

== Milestones ==
Player	Milestone	Date
Josie St. Martin	First goal with Minnesota Duluth	September 19, 2025
Molly Cole	First collegiate goal	September 19, 2025
Rae Mayer	First collegiate point	September 19, 2025
Thea Johansson	First goal with Minnesota Duluth	September 20, 2025
Kate Kosobud	First point with Minnesota Duluth	September 20, 2025
Krista Parkkonen	First point with Minnesota Duluth	September 20, 2025
Rae Mayer	First collegiate goal	September 25, 2025
Ashley Messier	First point with Minnesota Duluth	October 17, 2025
Ava MacLeod	First collegiate point	October 17, 2025
Thea Johansson	100th career point	October 18, 2025
