= List of Detroit Clutch draft picks =

The Detroit Clutch are a professional ice hockey team in the Professional Women's Hockey League (PWHL) that was founded ahead of the 2026–27 season as an expansion team. Their first draft pick was Andrea Brändli, selected 15th overall in the 2026 PWHL Draft. Detroit has participated in one PWHL Draft and drafted six players.

== Key ==
General terms and abbreviations
Term or abbreviation	Definition
Draft	The year that the player was selected
Round	The round of the draft in which the player was selected
Pick	The overall position in the draft at which the player was selected
Pos	Position of the player

Position abbreviations
Abbreviation	Definition
G	Goaltender
D	Defense
LW	Left wing
C	Center
RW	Right wing
F	Forward

== Draft picks ==
Full list of PWHL Detroit draft picks
Draft	Round	Pick	Player	Nationality	Pos	School/club team	Conference/league
2026	2	15	Andrea Brändli	Switzerland	G	Frölunda HC	SDHL
2026	2	22	Casey Borgiel	United States	D	Colgate University	ECAC
2026	3	34	MK O'Brien	United States	F	University of Minnesota Duluth	WCHA
2026	4	39	Kyla Josifovic	Canada	F	University of Connecticut	Hockey East
2026	5	51	Sena Catterall	Canada	F	Clarkson University	ECAC
2026	6	63	Georgia Schiff	United States	F	Cornell University	ECAC
