= Lyndie Lobdell =

American ice hockey player (born 2002)

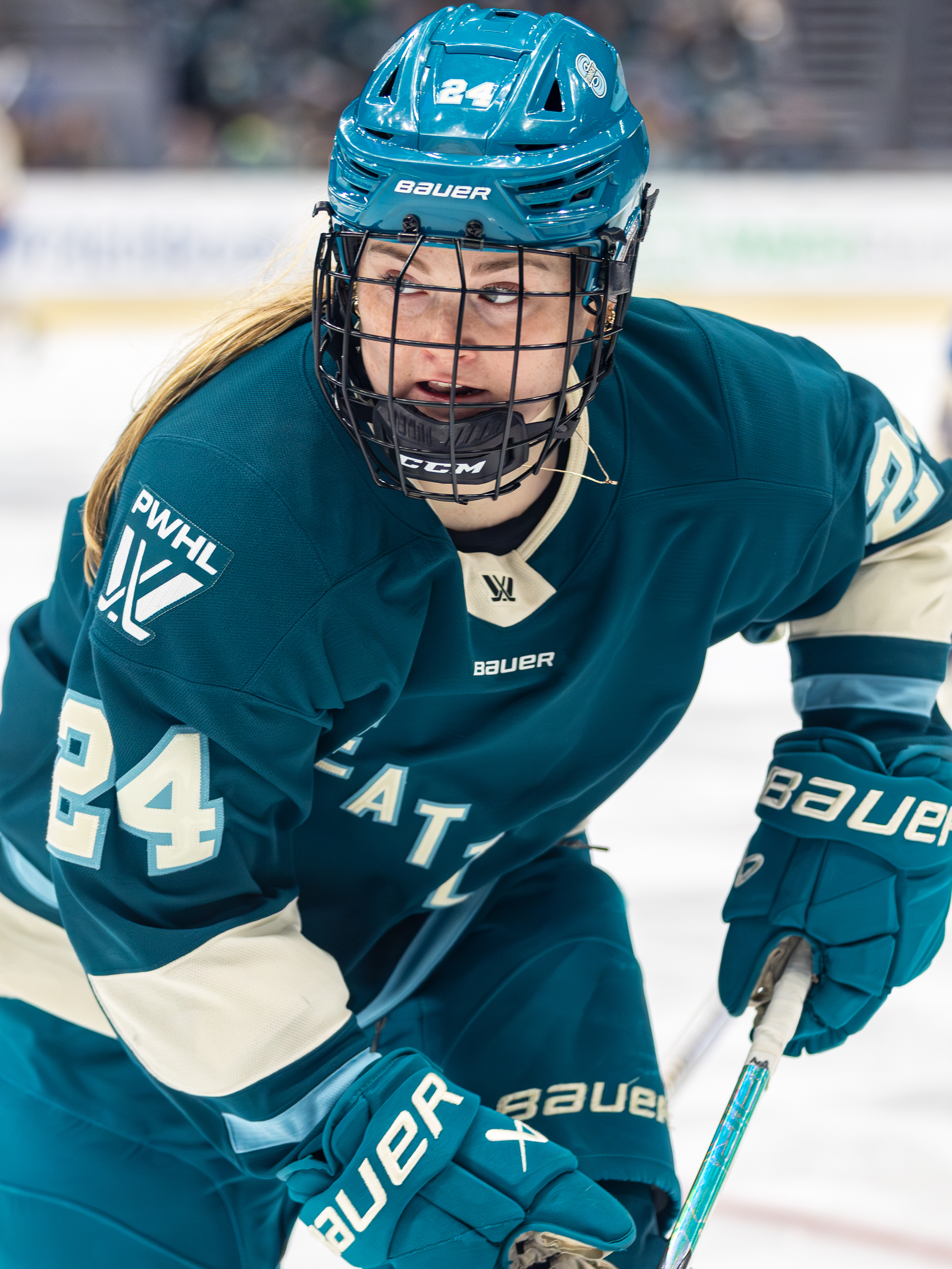
- Lobdell with the Seattle Torrent in 2026
- Born: September 1, 2002 (age 23) Aurora, Illinois, U.S.
- Height: 5 ft 7 in (170 cm)
- Position: Defense
- Shoots: Right
- PWHL team: Seattle Torrent

Lyndie Lobdell (born September 1, 2002) is an American professional ice hockey player who is a defender for the Seattle Torrent of the Professional Women's Hockey League (PWHL). She played college ice hockey for the Penn State Nittany Lions. Internationally, she won gold with the United States at the 2020 IIHF World Women's U18 Championship.

== Early life ==
Born to Jackie and David Lobdell, Lyndie was raised with her two sisters in Aurora, Illinois and attended Metea Valley High School. Hockey shaped the rhythm of her family life, with her father, a former Western Michigan defenseman who walked on and earned a captaincy, becoming her first coach and biggest influence.

Lobdell played youth hockey for the Chicago Mission, a premier Tier I AAA youth hockey club. She won four Illinois state championships with Chicago Mission U19 and U16 teams between 2015 and 2019. In 2016, her U16 Chicago Mission team finished as runners-up at the USA Hockey Tier 1 National Championship, and in 2018, she won the USA Hockey Tier 1 National Championship with the Chicago Mission U19 team. For high school hockey, Lobdell played for the Naperville-area Naper Valley Warriors in the Chicago Metro High School Girls League. She was selected to the all-state team in 2018 and 2019 and competed in the 2018 and 2019 all-state games. In 2019, she was named All-State MVP.

== Playing career ==
=== College ===
Lobdell played five seasons for the Penn State Nittany Lions from 2020–21 to 2024–25, appearing in 167 games and recording 20 goals and 64 assists for 84 points. She left Penn State as the program's all-time leading scorer among defensemen and the all-time leader in games played.

As a freshman in 2020–21, Lobdell appeared in 21 games and led all Nittany Lion defenders with 13 assists and 14 points, posting a team-best plus-24 rating. She recorded her first collegiate goal against Mercyhurst on February 27, scoring in the third period to send the game to overtime. For her performance, Lobdell was named to the All-CHA Rookie Team, becoming one of four Nittany Lions to receive the honor. In her sophomore season, Lobdell appeared in all 38 games and recorded 13 points on four goals and nine assists. She finished second on the team with 35 blocked shots and posted a plus-11 rating. On November 26, she scored a game-winning goal late in the third period on a power play against Minnesota-Duluth.

Lobdell's junior year saw her earn All-CHA Second Team honors after recording 16 points on two goals and 14 assists in 38 games. She led the team in blocked shots with 70 and was named CHA Defensive Player of the Week twice during the season. Penn State won the CHA Regular Season Championship and hosted the CHA Tournament for the first time in program history that season.

During her senior year, Lobdell played in all 38 games and posted career highs with nine goals and 11 assists for 20 points, including five power-play goals. She also recorded a career-high 58 blocked shots. Lobdell was named CHA Defensive Player of the Week three times during the season. In her fifth and final season at Penn State, Lobdell served as an alternate captain alongside Brianna Brooks and Mya Vaslet. She appeared in all 38 games, recording four goals and a career-high 17 assists for 21 points. Lobdell led the team with 46 blocked shots and posted a plus-36 rating, setting a single-season program record for a defender.

On January 31, 2025, against Robert Morris, Lobdell became Penn State's all-time leader in career points by a defenseman with an assist to McKenna Walsh in the third period. She finished her career with 84 points in 168 games, the most by any defenseman in Nittany Lions history. Her 168 career games also set a new Penn State record for most games played by any player in program history. On February 7, 2025, Lobdell scored the overtime game-winner against Mercyhurst to clinch Penn State's third consecutive Atlantic Hockey America (AHA) Regular Season Championship. Penn State went on to win the AHA Tournament Championship and earned its third consecutive NCAA Women's Ice Hockey Tournament berth. The team finished with 31 wins, a single-season program record. For her performance during the season, Lobdell was named AHA Defensive Player of the Month in October and earned AHA Defensive Player of the Week honors four times. She was selected to the All-AHA Second Team at the conclusion of the season.

=== Professional ===
==== Seattle Torrent (2025-present) ====
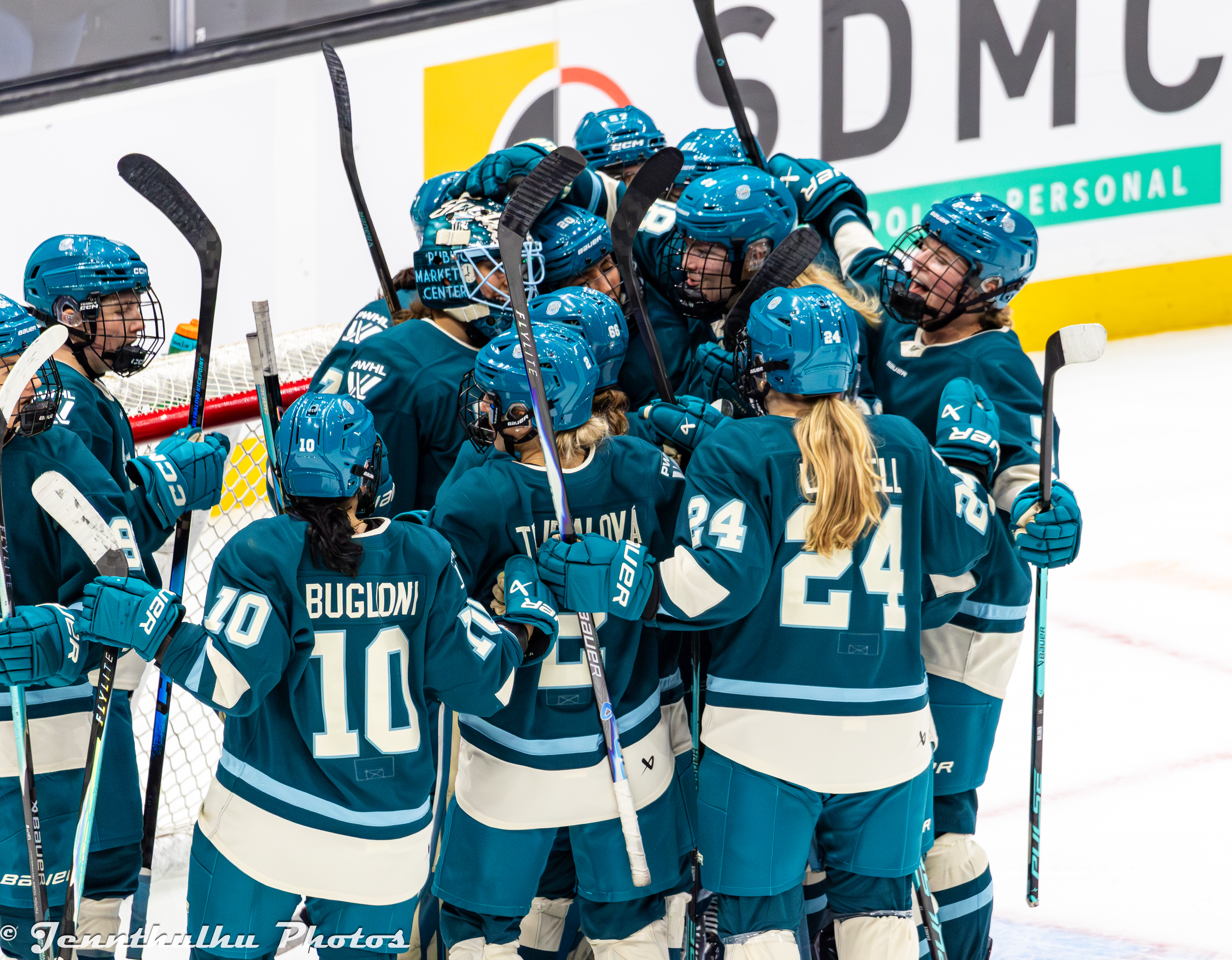
Lobdell (#24) celebrates with her Torrent teammates during a win against the Ottawa Charge, December 2025

On June 25, 2025, Lobdell was selected in the fifth round, 40th overall, by the Seattle Torrent in the 2025 PWHL Draft. She became the second Penn State player drafted to the PWHL in 2025, following forward Brianna Brooks, who was selected 32nd overall by the Vancouver Goldeneyes. Following training camp, Lobdell signed a one-year Standard Player Agreement with the Torrent on November 20, 2025. She joined an expansion roster that included veteran stars Hilary Knight (team captain), Alex Carpenter, and fellow Penn State alum Hannah Bilka, as well as former U.S. national team teammates Cayla Barnes and Anna Wilgren.

Lobdell made her professional debut on November 28, 2025, in the Torrent's inaugural home opener at Climate Pledge Arena, logging over 12 minutes of ice time in a 3 – 0 loss to the Minnesota Frost. The game drew a record crowd of 16,014, setting multiple U.S. attendance benchmarks including a new U.S. arena record for a women's hockey game and becoming the highest-attended primary home venue game in PWHL history. Following the game, Lobdell credited her off-season training for her success and praised her defensive linemates for helping her adjust to the increased speed and physicality of PWHL play. On December 28, 2025, Lobdell recorded her first point for the Torrent with an assist on Lexie Adzija's goal in a 4–3 loss to the New York Sirens in Dallas as part of the PWHL Takeover Tour. On January 20, 2026, she recorded an assist in Seattle's 6–4 victory over Toronto. The Torrent's six goals set a franchise record and matched the season high for any PWHL team.

== International play ==
Medal record

Representing United States

Ice hockey

World U18 Championship
Gold medal – first place	2020 Slovakia	

Lobdell represented the United States at the 2020 IIHF World Women's U18 Championship in Bratislava, Slovakia, winning a gold medal. She scored the semifinal game-winner against Russia en route to the title and finished the tournament with one goal in five games.

== Personal life ==
According to her USA Hockey profile, Lobdell's favorite postgame meal is grilled salmon marinated in teriyaki sauce.

== Career statistics ==
=== Regular season and playoffs ===
			Regular season					Playoffs
Season	Team	League	GP	G	A	Pts	PIM	GP	G	A	Pts	PIM
2020–21	Penn State	CHA	20	1	13	14	22	—	—	—	—	—
2021–22	Penn State	CHA	33	4	9	13	33	—	—	—	—	—
2022–23	Penn State	CHA	38	2	14	16	14	—	—	—	—	—
2023–24	Penn State	CHA	38	9	11	20	26	—	—	—	—	—
2024–25	Penn State	AHA	38	4	17	21	42	—	—	—	—	—
2025–26	Seattle Torrent	PWHL	25	0	4	4	8	—	—	—	—	—
PWHL totals			25	0	4	4	8	—	—	—	—	—

=== International ===
Year	Team	Event	Result	GP	G	A	Pts	PIM
2020	United States	U18	1st place, gold medalist(s)	5	1	0	1	6
Junior totals				5	1	0	1	6

== Awards and honors ==
Honor	Year	Ref
College
All-CHA Rookie Team	2021	
All-CHA Second Team	2023	
All-AHA Second Team	2025	
