= Olivia Wallin =

Canadian ice hockey player (born 2002)

- Born: March 9, 2002 (age 24) Oakville, Ontario, Canada
- Height: 5 ft 7 in (170 cm)
- Position: Forward
- Shoots: Right
- PWHL team Former teams: Detroit Clutch; Ottawa Charge

Olivia Wallin (born March 9, 2002) is a Canadian professional ice hockey Forward for the Detroit Clutch of the Professional Women's Hockey League (PWHL). She previously played for the Ottawa Charge of the PWHL. She played college ice hockey for Penn State and the Minnesota Duluth.

== Early life ==
Wallin is from Oakville, Ontario. She played junior hockey for the Stoney Creek Sabres and Etobicoke Jr. Dolphins, and won gold with Ontario Red at the 2019 National Women’s U18 Championship.

== Playing career ==
=== College ===
Wallin began her collegiate career at Penn State (2020–23). As a freshman in 2020–21 she led all NCAA Division I freshmen with 13 goals and was named to the CHA All-Rookie Team.

After three seasons at Penn State, Wallin transferred to Minnesota Duluth for 2023–24 and 2024–25. As a graduate student during the 2024–25 season, she posted career highs with 40 points (16 goals, 24 assists) in 39 games and earned WCHA Forward of the Month in February before being named the Hockey Commissioners Association National Player of the Month.

=== Professional ===
On June 24–25, 2025, Wallin was drafted in the sixth round, 47th overall, by the Seattle Torrent in the 2025 PWHL Draft. On November 20, 2025, she signed a reserve player contract with the Charge.

On June 22, 2026, she signed a one-year contract with the Detroit Clutch.

== Career statistics ==
			Regular season					Playoffs
Season	Team	League	GP	G	A	Pts	PIM	GP	G	A	Pts	PIM
2020–21	Penn State	CHA	19	13	3	16	—	—	—	—	—	—
2021–22	Penn State	CHA	25	7	7	14	—	—	—	—	—	—
2022–23	Penn State	CHA	38	17	17	34	—	—	—	—	—	—
2023–24	Minnesota Duluth	WCHA	39	6	18	24	—	—	—	—	—	—
2024–25	Minnesota Duluth	WCHA	39	16	24	40	—	—	—	—	—	—
2025–26	Ottawa Charge	PWHL	2	0	0	0	0	—	—	—	—	—	—
PWHL totals			2	0	0	0	0	—	—	—	—	—

== Awards and honours ==
Honour	Year	Ref
College
CHA All-Rookie Team	2020–21	
