= Sciba =

Sciba is a surname. Notable people with the surname include:

- Josh Sciba (born 1985), American ice hockey coach
- Nick Sciba (born 1999), American football player
