= Sena Catterall =

- Born: November 25, 2001 (age 24) Montreal, Quebec
- Height: 5 ft 5 in (165 cm)
- Position: Forward
- Shoots: Left
- PWHL team: Detroit Clutch
- Playing career: 2026–present

Sena Catterall (born November 25, 2001) is a professional ice hockey forward drafted by the Detroit Clutch of the Professional Women's Hockey League. She played college ice hockey at Clarkson University, and was selected fifty-first overall in the 2026 PWHL Draft. Catterall also plays baseball for the Canada women's national baseball team.

== Playing career ==
=== Baseball ===
At the 2024 Women's Baseball World Cup, held in Thunder Bay, Ontario, Catterall hit .500, amassing nine hits in 18 at bats, plus 10 runs scored.

=== Ice hockey ===
During her freshman season (2022-23) with Clarkson, Catterall appeared in 42 games. As a sophomore, she played in 36 games and scored 21 points overall, including four game-winning goals.

== Awards and honours ==
=== Baseball ===
- Baseball Canada Ashley Stephenson Award (2023)
- Baseball Canada National Women's Team MVP (2024)

=== Ice hockey ===
- ECAC Hockey All Academic (2022-23, 2023-24)
- AHCA/Krampade All-America Scholar (2023-24)
