= Christine Bumstead =

Canadian ice hockey coach (born 1995)

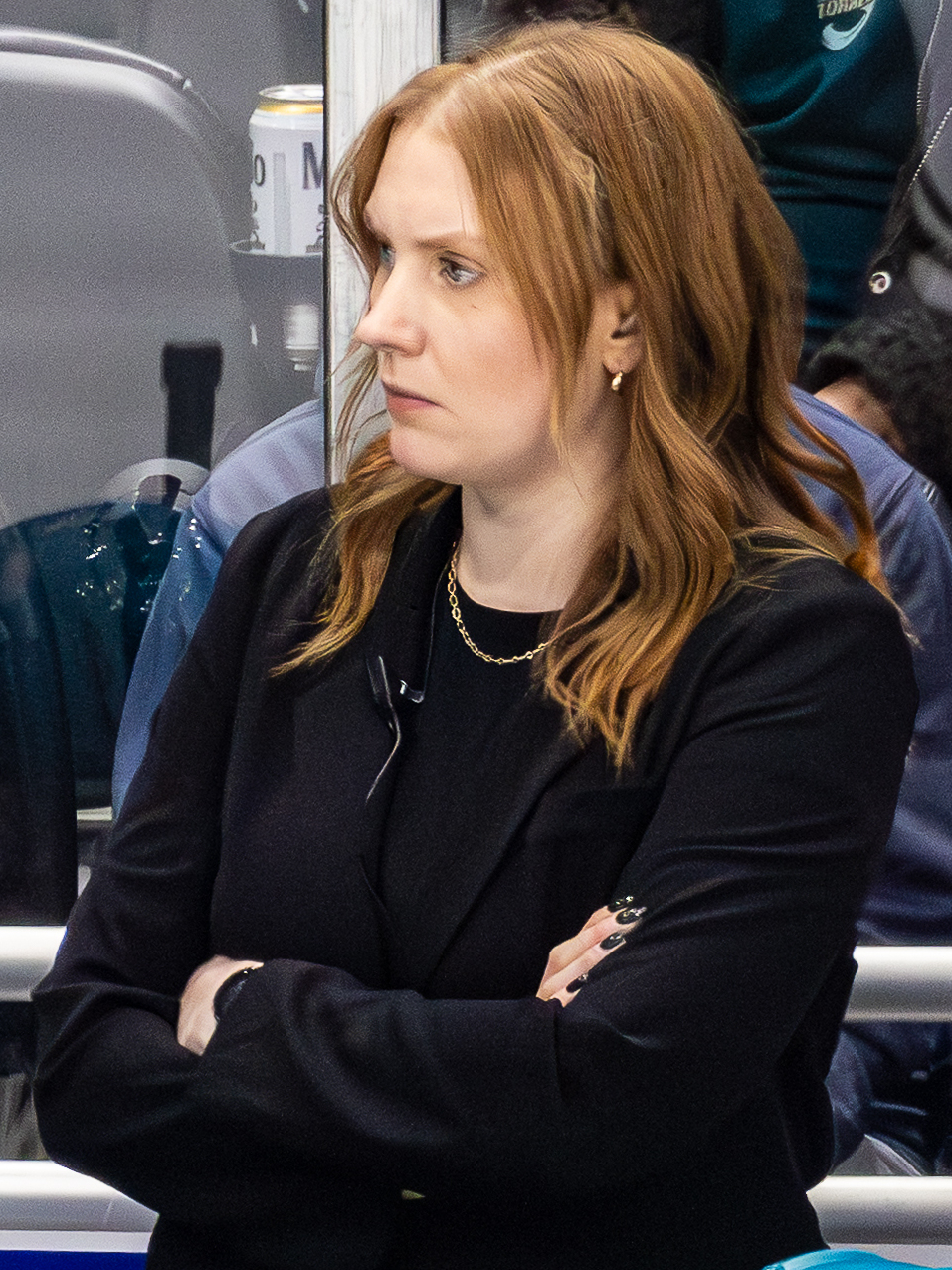
- Bumstead in 2025

Current position
- Title: Head coach
- Team: Seattle Torrent
- Record: 0–0–0

Biographical details
- Born: November 13, 1995 (age 30); Winnipeg, Manitoba, Canada

Coaching career (HC unless noted)
- 2021–2024: Saskatchewan (Assistant)
- 2023–2025: Saskatoon Blades (Assistant)
- 2025–2026: Seattle Torrent (Assistant)
- 2026–present: Seattle Torrent

Christine Bumstead (born November 13, 1995) is a Canadian ice hockey coach. She is the current head coach for the Seattle Torrent of the Professional Women's Hockey League (PWHL).

== Coaching career ==
On June 9, 2021, Bumstead was named an assistant coach for the Saskatchewan Huskies women's ice hockey team. On September 19, 2023, she was named a player development coach for the Saskatoon Blades of the Western Hockey League (WHL) for the 2023–24 season. She became the first female coach in Blades franchise history.

She also served as the head coach and general manager for Canada at the 2024 World Deaf Ice Hockey Championship.

On August 21, 2025, Bumstead was named an assistant coach for the Seattle Torrent, becoming the first assistant coach in franchise history. After former head coach Steve O'Rourke was fired, she was promoted to head coach of the Torrent on June 11, 2026.
