= PWHL Takeover Tour =

List of PWHL games for expansion exploration

The PWHL Takeover Tour is the moniker given to neutral site games played by the Professional Women's Hockey League (PWHL). The tour brings PWHL regular season games to cities that do not currently have a league franchise, allowing fans in new markets to experience professional women's ice hockey while the league evaluates potential expansion locations.

== Background ==
Since the PWHL's inaugural season, the league has hosted regular-season games at neutral sites outside of its home markets as part of initiatives to expand its fanbase, test potential expansion markets, and grow the sport of professional women's ice hockey across North America.

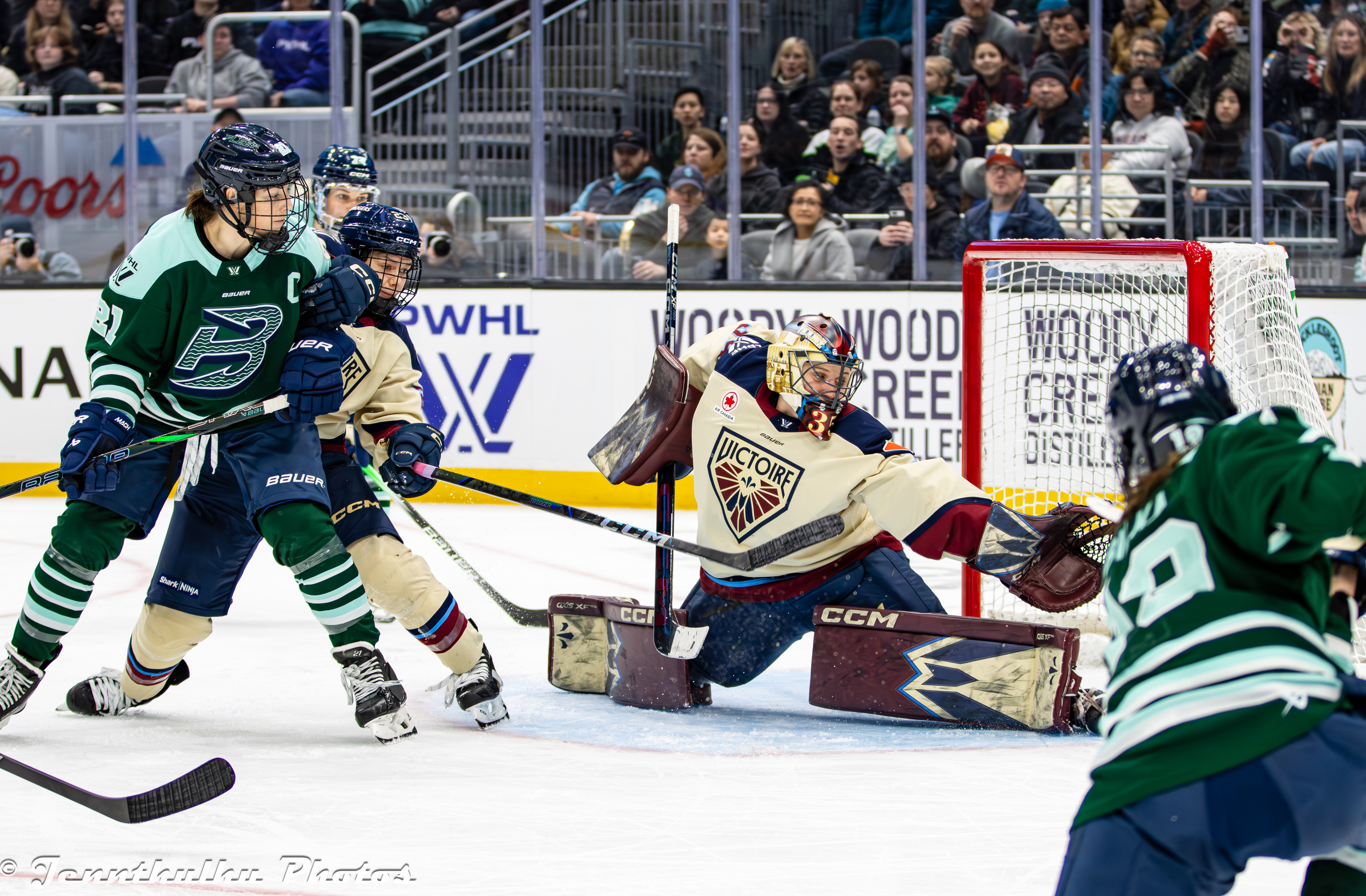
Hilary Knight (far left) shoots against Montreal Victoire in a PWHL Takeover Tour game in Seattle, January 2025

During the league's second season in 2024–25, the league formalized its neutral site program as the PWHL Takeover Tour, which featured nine games across the United States and Canada. The tour expanded to 16 games for the 2025–26 PWHL season. The Takeover Tour serves several strategic purposes including: market testing, fan development, developing relationships with cities and partners, league growth, and player exposure. PWHL Executive Vice President of Hockey Operations Jayna Hefford stated that the tour has been "one of the most rewarding initiatives since our inception—for our fans, our athletes, and our staff."

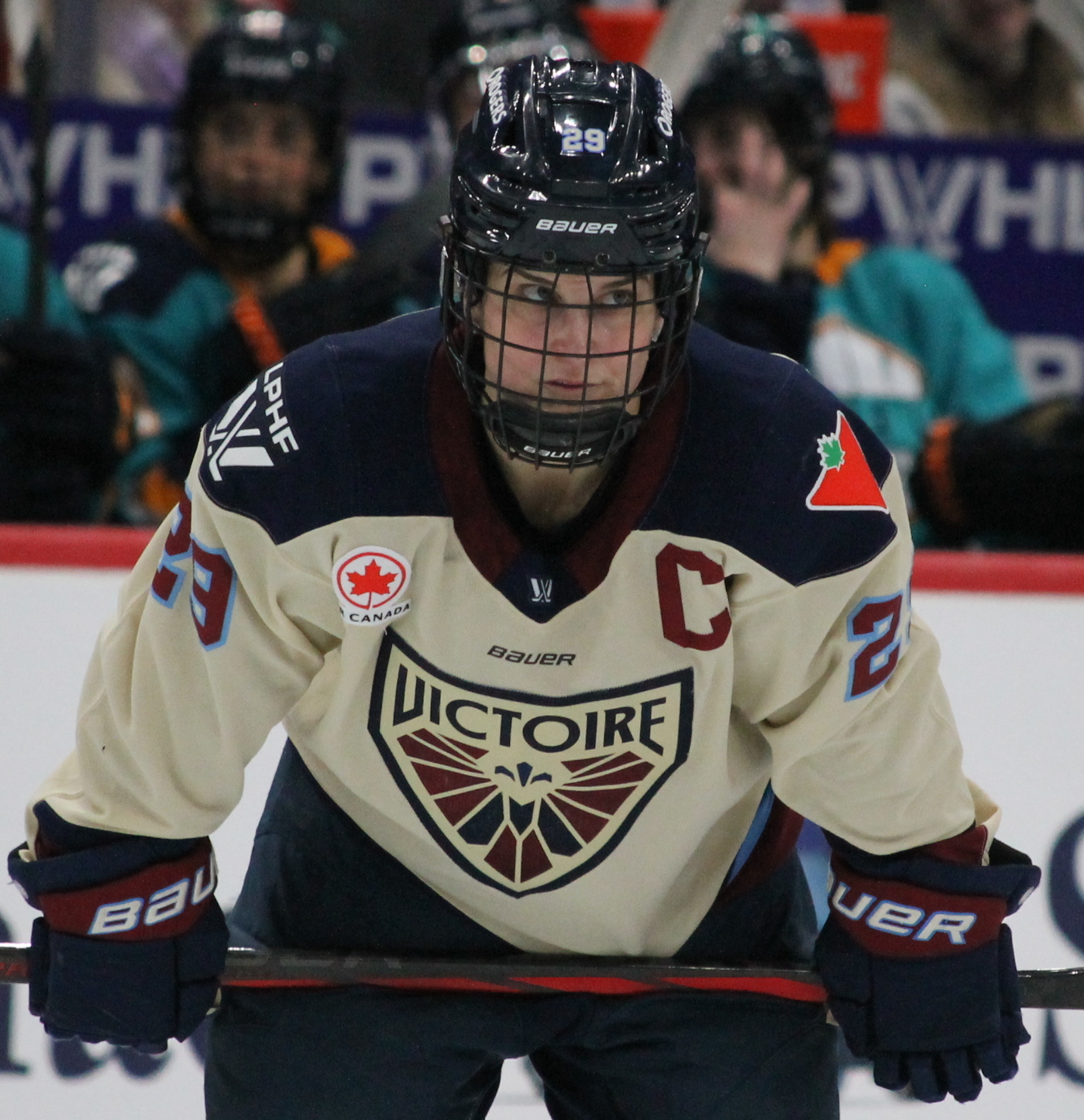
Team Canada captain Marie-Philip Poulin playing for Montreal Victoire in 2025

The success of the Takeover Tour has influenced the PWHL's expansion strategy. Prior to announcing Seattle and Vancouver as the league's first two expansion teams in April 2025, the inaugural tour had tested markets in both cities with strong results—particularly the sold-out Vancouver game that drew over 19,000 fans. Both cities joined the league as permanent franchises for the 2025–26 PWHL season. PWHL officials have stated that the tour demonstrates the strong demand for professional women's hockey across North America and provides valuable data for future expansion decisions. Scheer noted that the league has "proven that time is overrated" regarding the pace of expansion, emphasizing that growth and profitability are interconnected objectives. At an Ottawa City Council meeting, Scheer stated: "We're going to expand at least two to four teams next year... We are in growth mode, and this league is exploding." The increasing interest in the PWHL expanding beyond its current cities was evidenced by a new single-day ticket sales record set during 2025–26 PWHL Takeover Tour presales which surpassed the previous benchmark by more than 55 percent.

== Format ==
PWHL Takeover Tour games are official PWHL regular-season contests that count toward team standings. Two of the neutral-site games are designated as home games for participating teams. The games follow standard PWHL rules and scoring systems.

== 2024 season ==
The inaugural PWHL season featured two neutral site games as part of "PWHL Takeover Weekend" in March 2024.

2024 PWHL neutral site games
Date	Venue	City	Visiting team	Home team	Score	Attendance	Ref.
March 16, 2024	Little Caesars Arena	Detroit, Michigan	Ottawa	Boston	1–2 (SO)	13,736	
March 17, 2024	PPG Paints Arena	Pittsburgh, Pennsylvania	Toronto	Montreal	2–1	8,850	

== 2024–25 season (PWHL Takeover Tour) ==
The first PWHL Takeover Tour was announced on November 18, 2024, and launched on January 5, 2025. The 2024–25 season featured nine neutral site games from January through March 2025. The tour drew a total of 123,601 fans across nine games and set multiple attendance records for professional women's hockey. An estimated 80% of attendees experienced their first-ever PWHL game Fans from all 50 U.S. states and all 13 Canadian provinces and territories attended the games. Social media engagement led to a 30% increase in league-wide followers during the tour.

2024–25 PWHL Takeover Tour games
Date	Venue	City	Visiting team	Home team	Score	Attendance	Ref.
January 5, 2025	Climate Pledge Arena	Seattle, Washington*	Montreal	Boston	2–3 (SO)	12,608	
January 8, 2025	Rogers Arena	Vancouver, British Columbia*	Montreal	Toronto	2–1	19,038	
January 12, 2025	Ball Arena	Denver, Colorado	Montreal	Minnesota	2–4	14,018	
January 19, 2025	Videotron Centre	Quebec City, Quebec	Ottawa	Montreal	1–2	18,259	
February 16, 2025	Rogers Place	Edmonton, Alberta	Toronto	Ottawa	3–2 (OT)	17,518	
February 23, 2025	KeyBank Center	Buffalo, New York	Boston	New York	3–2 (SO)	8,512	
March 7, 2025	Lenovo Center	Raleigh, North Carolina	Ottawa	Minnesota	0–4	10,782	
March 16, 2025	Little Caesars Arena	Detroit, Michigan	Minnesota	New York	1–4	14,288	
March 29, 2025	Enterprise Center	St. Louis, Missouri	Ottawa	Boston	2–1	8,578	

*City joined the PWHL as an expansion market for the 2025–26 season.

Detroit's Little Caesars Arena was the only venue to host a second neutral-site PWHL game, having previously hosted a game on March 16, 2024, that drew a then-U.S. professional women's hockey attendance record of 13,736 fans. The second game attendance at Little Caesars Arena grew to 14,288.

=== Attendance records ===
The 2024–25 Takeover Tour set multiple attendance records:

- U.S. professional women's hockey record: 14,288 fans in Detroit on March 16, 2025 (breaking the previous record of 14,018 set in Denver on January 12, 2025)
- Fourth all-time PWHL attendance: 19,038 fans in Vancouver on January 8, 2025 (sold out)
- All-time PWHL single-game attendance: Five games ranked in the top 10 for attendance in league history

== 2025–26 season (expanded Takeover Tour) ==
The 2025–26 season features an expanded PWHL Takeover Tour with 16 neutral site games across 11 cities from December 2025 through April 2026. The tour includes seven new markets (Calgary, Chicago, Dallas, Halifax, Hamilton, Washington, D.C., and Winnipeg) and four returning markets (Denver, Detroit, Edmonton, and Québec City) from the previous season. The tour's expansion was covered extensively in Canadian media, with TSN reporting that the tour would make its regular-season debut in the four new Canadian cities.

With the PWHL's expansion to eight teams (adding Seattle and Vancouver as permanent franchises) in 2025, all eight teams in the league participate in at least three Takeover Tour games during the 2025–26 season. The 2025–26 tour includes multiple presenting partnerships and sponsors, including: DoorDash, BJ's Wholesale Club, Woody Creek Distillers, Ally Financial, Explore Edmonton, and the province of Nova Scotia.

2025–26 PWHL Takeover Tour games
Date	Venue	City	Visiting team	Home team	Score	Attendance	Ref.
December 17, 2025	Scotiabank Centre	Halifax, Nova Scotia	Montreal	Toronto	2–1 (SO)	10,438	
December 21, 2025	Allstate Arena	Rosemont, Illinois	Ottawa	Minnesota	3–2 (OT)	7,238	
December 27, 2025	Rogers Place	Edmonton, Alberta	Minnesota	Vancouver	2–1 (OT)	10,264	
December 28, 2025	American Airlines Center	Dallas, Texas	Seattle	New York	3–4	8,514	
January 3, 2026	Little Caesars Arena	Detroit, Michigan*	Vancouver	Boston	4–3	9,624	
January 3, 2026	TD Coliseum	Hamilton, Ontario*	Seattle	Toronto	3–2 (SO)	16,012	
January 11, 2026	Videotron Centre	Quebec City, Quebec	Vancouver	Montreal	0–1	14,624	
January 11, 2026	Scotiabank Centre	Halifax, Nova Scotia	Ottawa	Boston	2–1	10,452	
January 18, 2026	Capital One Arena	Washington, D.C.	Montreal	New York	1–2	17,228	
January 25, 2026	Ball Arena	Denver, Colorado	Vancouver	Seattle	3–1	11,612	
March 15, 2026	Ball Arena	Denver, Colorado	New York	Minnesota	3–4	15,512	
March 22, 2026	Canada Life Centre	Winnipeg, Manitoba	Montreal	Ottawa	1–2 (OT)	15,225	
March 25, 2026	Allstate Arena	Rosemont, Illinois	New York	Seattle	1–4	10,006	
March 28, 2026	Little Caesars Arena	Detroit, Michigan*	New York	Montreal	1–3	15,938	
April 1, 2026	Scotiabank Saddledome	Calgary, Alberta	Toronto	Ottawa	2–1	16,150	
April 7, 2026	Rogers Place	Edmonton, Alberta	Boston	Vancouver	5–1	10,794	

*City joined the PWHL as an expansion market for the 2026–27 season.

=== Attendance records ===
The 2025–26 Takeover Tour broke the following attendance records:

- U.S. professional women's hockey record: 17,228 fans at Capital One Arena in Washington, D.C. on January 18, 2026, between the Montréal Victoire and New York Sirens briefly set a new record that was broken the following month by a sellout of 17,335 at Climate Pledge Arena in Seattle on February 27, 2026, following the Winter Olympics.

=== Broadcast coverage ===
All games are broadcast on YouTube to viewers in the United States, Europe, Asia, South America, Africa, and Australia. In Canada, broadcast partners include: TSN, Sportsnet, Amazon Prime Video, and CBC. PWHL Takeover Tour games in the United States also air on over-the-air broadcast partners in each host market, including TEGNA in Denver, Scripps Sports in Detroit, and FOX-owned stations in Chicago, Dallas, and Washington, D.C.

== Statistics ==
=== Games by venue ===
Neutral site games by venue (through April 7, 2026)
Venue	City	Games	Total attendance	Average	First game	Most recent
Little Caesars Arena	Detroit, Michigan	4	53,586	13,397	March 16, 2024	March 28, 2026
Rogers Place	Edmonton, Alberta	3	38,576	12,859	February 16, 2025	April 7, 2026
Scotiabank Centre	Halifax, Nova Scotia	2	20,890	10,445	December 17, 2025	January 11, 2026
Vidéotron Centre	Quebec City, Quebec	2	32,883	16,442	January 19, 2025	January 11, 2026
Ball Arena	Denver, Colorado	3	41,142	13,714	January 12, 2025	March 15, 2026
Allstate Arena	Rosemont, Illinois	2	17,244	8,622	December 21, 2025	March 25, 2026
Rogers Arena	Vancouver, British Columbia	1	19,038	19,038	January 8, 2025	January 8, 2025
Climate Pledge Arena	Seattle, Washington	1	12,608	12,608	January 5, 2025	January 5, 2025
KeyBank Center	Buffalo, New York	1	8,512	8,512	February 23, 2025	February 23, 2025
Lenovo Center	Raleigh, North Carolina	1	10,782	10,782	March 7, 2025	March 7, 2025
Enterprise Center	St. Louis, Missouri	1	8,578	8,578	March 29, 2025	March 29, 2025
PPG Paints Arena	Pittsburgh, Pennsylvania	1	8,850	8,850	April 20, 2024	April 20, 2024
American Airlines Center	Dallas, Texas	1	8,514	8,514	February 7, 2026	February 7, 2026
TD Coliseum	Hamilton, Ontario	1	16,012	16,012	January 3, 2026	January 3, 2026
Capital One Arena	Washington, D.C.	1	17,228	17,228	January 18, 2026	January 18, 2026
Canada Life Centre	Winnipeg, Manitoba	1	15,225	15,225	March 22, 2026	March 22, 2026
Scotiabank Saddledome	Calgary, Alberta	1	16,150	16,150	April 1, 2026	April 1, 2026

=== Games by city ===
Neutral site games by city
City	Country	Games	Status
Detroit, Michigan	United States	4	Detroit Clutch (expansion 2026)
Edmonton, Alberta	Canada	3	No PWHL team
Denver, Colorado	United States	3	No PWHL team
Halifax, Nova Scotia	Canada	2	No PWHL team
Dallas, Texas	United States	2	No PWHL team
Chicago, Illinois	United States	2	No PWHL team
Quebec City, Quebec	Canada	2	No PWHL team
Seattle, Washington	United States	1	Seattle Torrent (expansion 2025)
Vancouver, British Columbia	Canada	1	Vancouver Goldeneyes (expansion 2025)
Buffalo, New York	United States	1	No PWHL team
Raleigh, North Carolina	United States	1	No PWHL team
St. Louis, Missouri	United States	1	No PWHL team
Pittsburgh, Pennsylvania	United States	1	No PWHL team
Hamilton, Ontario	Canada	1	Hamilton Havoc (expansion 2026)
Washington, D.C.	United States	1	No PWHL team
Winnipeg, Manitoba	Canada	1	No PWHL team
Calgary, Alberta	Canada	1	No PWHL team

== See also ==
- Professional Women's Hockey League
- Women's ice hockey
