= PWHL records and statistics =

Notable records and statistics in the PWHL

The following is a compilation of notable records and statistics for teams and players in the Professional Women's Hockey League.

== Champions and regular season winners ==
Through May 20, 2026 (regular season and playoff matches)

Season	Playoff final			Regular season	
Season	Champions	Score	Runners-up	Winners	Runners-up
2024	PWHL Minnesota	3–2	PWHL Boston	PWHL Toronto (47 points)	PWHL Montreal (41 points)
2024–25	Minnesota Frost	3–1	Ottawa Charge	Montreal Victoire (53 points)	Toronto Sceptres (48 points)
2025–26	Montreal Victoire	3–1	Ottawa Charge	Montreal Victoire (62 points)	Boston Fleet (62 points)

=== Total titles by team ===
Team	Seasons	Championships	Regular season winners	Total
Minnesota Frost	3	2 (2024, 2024–25)	0	2
Montreal Victoire	3	1 (2025–26)	2 (2024–25, 2025–26)	3
Toronto Sceptres	3	0	1 (2024)	1

== Player records (career) ==
As of 2025–26 season

=== Goalie stats ===
As of November 26, 2026

==== Most shutouts in regular season games ====
Rank	Player	Games played	Shutouts
1	Aerin Frankel	67	10
2	Ann-Renée Desbiens	62	8
3	Kayle Osborne	37	5
3	Gwyneth Philips	43	5
3	Maddie Rooney	45	5
3	Corinne Schroeder	52	5
7	Kristen Campbell	56	4
8	Raygan Kirk	33	3
8	Nicole Hensley	38	3
8	Emerance Maschmeyer	60	3

==== Regular season games goals against average ====
Rank	Player	Games played	GAA
1	Ann-Renée Desbiens	62	1.66
2	Aerin Frankel	67	1.77
3	Raygan Kirk	33	1.98
4	Maddie Rooney	45	2.06
5	Gwyneth Philips	43	2.12
6	Kristen Campbell	56	2.13
7	Elaine Chuli	25	2.31
8	Kayle Osborne	37	2.40
9	Nicole Hensley	38	2.46
9	Corinne Schroeder	52	2.46

==== Regular season minutes ====
Rank	Player	Minutes played
1	Aerin Frankel	3976:22
2	Ann-Renée Desbiens	3713:16
3	Emerance Maschmeyer	3404:18
4	Kristen Campbell	3241:27
5	Corinne Schroeder	3072:31
6	Maddie Rooney	2706:25
7	Gwyneth Philips	2437:46
8	Nicole Hensley	2269:37
9	Kayle Osborne	2147:14
10	Raygan Kirk	1879:24

=== Skater Stats ===
As of November 18, 2026

==== Most point in regular season games ====
Rank	Player	Games played	Goals	Assists	Points
1	Marie-Philip Poulin	70	38	29	67
2	Taylor Fox	78	25	40	65
3	Daryl Watts	81	32	31	63
3	Alex Carpenter	80	31	32	63
3	Kendall Coyne Schofield	77	30	33	63
6	Laura Stacey	80	28	34	62
7	Jessie Eldridge	84	30	31	61
7	Brianne Jenner	82	28	33	61
9	Kelly Pannek	84	23	37	60
10	Hannah Miller	82	24	32	56
10	Alina Müller	80	16	40	56

==== Most goals scored in regular season games ====
Rank	Player	Games played	Goals
1	Marie-Philip Poulin	70	38
2	Daryl Watts	81	32
3	Alex Carpenter	80	31
4	Kendall Coyne Schofield	77	30
4	Jessie Eldridge	84	30
6	Laura Stacey	80	28
6	Brianne Jenner	82	28
6	Grace Zumwinkle	75	28
9	Hilary Knight	76	26
9	Sarah Nurse	64	26
9	Natalie Spooner	68	26

==== Most assists in regular season games ====
Rank	Player	Games played	Assists
1	Taylor Fox	78	40
1	Alina Müller	80	40
3	Kelly Pannek	84	37
4	Renata Fast	80	35
5	Sophie Jacques	77	34
5	Laura Stacey	80	34
5	Megan Keller	84	34
8	Erin Ambrose	73	33
8	Kendall Coyne Schofield	77	33
8	Brianne Jenner	82	33

==== Most penalty minutes in regular season games ====
Rank	Player	Games played	Penalty minutes
1	Tereza Vanišová	83	85
2	Micah Zandee-Hart	78	76
3	Abby Roque	83	68
4	Renata Fast	80	66
5	Maggie Flaherty	76	61
6	Jade Downie-Landry	77	57
7	Marie-Philip Poulin	70	55
8	Taylor Girard	63	54
8	Emma Maltais	84	54
10	Gabbie Hughes	81	52

== All-time regular season success ==
Through completion of 2025–26 regular season.

=== Regular season championships ===
Team	Seasons	Championships	Years
Montreal Victoire	3	2	2024–25, 2025–26
Toronto Sceptres	3	1	2024

=== All-time regular season table ===
Club	Seasons	GP	W	OTW	OTL	L	TW	GF	GA	GD	Pts	PPG	TW%
Montreal	3	84	38	16	10	20	54	215	165	50	156	1.857	.643
Boston	3	84	33	15	12	24	48	199	178	21	141	1.679	.571
Toronto	3	84	35	8	12	29	43	193	195	−2	133	1.583	.512
Minnesota	3	84	31	12	12	29	43	230	203	27	129	1.536	.512
Ottawa	3	84	29	11	11	33	40	204	216	−12	120	1.429	.476
Vancouver	1	30	9	3	4	14	12	68	81	−13	37	1.233	.400
New York	3	84	22	11	11	40	33	187	230	−43	99	1.179	.393
Seattle	1	30	8	1	5	16	9	64	92	−28	31	1.033	.300

Ranking method
* Points per game
* Total win percentage
* Regulation wins

=== Playoff qualification percentage ===
Club	Seasons	Playoff qualifications	Percentage
Minnesota	3	3	100%
Montreal	3	3	100%
Boston	3	2	67%
Ottawa	3	2	67%
Toronto	3	2	67%
New York	3	0	0%
Seattle	1	0	0%
Vancouver	1	0	0%

== All-time playoff success ==
Through completion of 2026 Playoffs.

=== Walter Cups ===
Team	Seasons	Walter Cups	Years
Minnesota Frost	3	2	2024, 2024–25
Montreal Victoire	3	1	2025–26

=== Series winning percentage ===
Club	Appearances	Champions	Finals	Series played	Series won	Series lost	Series won %
Minnesota	3	2	2	5	4	1	80.000%
Montreal	3	1	1	4	2	2	50.000%
Ottawa	2	0	2	4	2	2	50.000%
Boston	2	0	1	3	1	2	33.333%
Toronto	2	0	0	2	0	2	0.000%

=== Full playoff record ===
Club	Appearances	Series sweeps	3–1 wins	3–2 wins	2–3 losses	1–3 losses	Sweep losses	W	L	W%	WPS	LPS
Minnesota	3	0	2	2	1	0	0	14	9	60.87%	2.8	1.8
Boston	2	1	0	0	1	1	0	6	6	50.000%	2	2
Ottawa	2	0	2	0	0	2	0	8	8	50.00%	2.667	2.667
Montreal	3	0	2	0	0	1	1	7	8	46.666%	1.75	2
Toronto	2	0	0	0	1	1	0	3	6	33.33%	1.5	3

== Longest streaks ==
Through completion of 2025–26 season.

Legend
Consecutive run in progress

Most consecutive postseason berths
Rank	Team	Number	From	Until
1	Montreal	3	2024	2025–26
1	Minnesota	3	2024	2025–26
3	Toronto	2	2024	2024–25
3	Ottawa	2	2024–25	2025–26

Longest postseason drought
Rank	Team	Number	From	Until
1	New York Sirens	3	2024	2025–26
2	Ottawa Charge	1	2024	2024
2	Boston Fleet	1	2024–25	2024–25
2	Toronto Sceptres	1	2025–26	2025–26
2	Vancouver Goldeneyes	1	2025–26	2025–26
2	Seattle Torrent	1	2025–26	2025–26

=== Regular season result streaks ===
Legend
Consecutive run in progress

Most regulation wins in a row
Rank	Team	Number	From	Until
1	Toronto	5	March 2, 2024	March 20, 2024
1	Boston Fleet	5	November 23, 2025	December 17, 2025
1	Boston Fleet	5	March 1, 2026	March 29, 2026
4	Toronto	4	January 26, 2024	February 16, 2024
4	Montreal	4	January 12, 2025	January 29, 2025
4	Minnesota	4	March 13, 2026	March 21, 2026
7	Minnesota	3	January 3, 2024	January 10, 2024
7	Montreal	3	February 26, 2024	March 6, 2024
7	Toronto	3	March 9, 2025	March 23, 2025
7	Ottawa	3	March 15, 2025	March 25, 2025
7	New York	3	March 25, 2025	April 27, 2025

Most total wins in a row
Rank	Team	Number	From	Until
1	Toronto	11	January 26, 2024	March 20, 2024
2	Boston	6	January 18, 2026	March 10, 2026
2	Ottawa	6	December 21, 2025	January 11, 2026
4	Minnesota	5	March 3, 2024	March 24, 2024
4	Montreal	5	January 25, 2025	January 30, 2025
4	Montreal	5	February 12, 2025	March 6, 2025
4	Boston	5	November 23, 2025	December 17, 2025
4	Montreal	5	January 2, 2026	January 18, 2026
4	Boston	5	March 1, 2026	March 29, 2026
10	Minnesota	4	March 8, 2026	March 21, 2026
10	Ottawa	4	April 30, 2024	December 3, 2024
10	Toronto	4	May 1, 2024	December 3, 2024
10	New York	4	April 30, 2024	December 4, 2024
10	Minnesota	4	January 28, 2025	February 6, 2025
10	Boston	4	February 16, 2025	February 23, 2025
10	Toronto	4	March 6, 2025	March 23, 2025
10	Ottawa	4	March 9, 2025	March 25, 2025
10	Ottawa	4	April 11, 2026	April 25, 2026

Most games without losing in regulation
Rank	Team	Number	From	Until
1	Toronto	11	January 26, 2024	March 20, 2024
2	Boston	9	February 16, 2025	March 18, 2025
3	Montreal	8	February 22, 2025	March 18, 2025
3	Montreal	8	January 2, 2026	January 28, 2026
3	Boston	8	December 21, 2025	March 10, 2026
6	Montreal	7	January 10, 2024	February 4, 2024

Most games without winning in regulation
Rank	Team	Number	From	Until
1	New York	12	January 26, 2024	March 20, 2024
2	New York	10	January 31, 2025	March 12, 2025
3	Minnesota	9	March 24, 2025	December 7, 2024
4	Boston	7	March 7, 2024	March 25, 2024
4	New York	7	March 11, 2026	April 1, 2026

Most total losses in a row
Rank	Team	Number	From	Until
1	New York	9	January 31, 2025	March 5, 2025
2	Minnesota	8	April 18, 2025	December 7, 2024
3	New York	7	January 28, 2024	March 20, 2024
4	Minnesota	5	December 22, 2024	January 8, 2025
5	Boston	4	February 4, 2024	February 19, 2024
5	Montreal	4	March 8, 2024	March 24, 2024
5	Montreal	4	December 4, 2024	December 28, 2024
5	Ottawa	4	December 29, 2024	January 11, 2025
5	Toronto	4	December 27, 2024	January 12, 2025
5	New York	4	December 3, 2025	December 17, 2025
5	Seattle	4	January 25, 2026	March 4, 2026
5	Seattle	4	March 11, 2026	March 21, 2026
5	Vancouver	4	January 28, 2026	March 14, 2026
5	New York	4	March 15, 2026	March 28, 2026

Most regulation losses in a row
Rank	Team	Number	From	Until
1	Minnesota	5	April 18, 2024	May 4, 2024
1	New York	5	February 2, 2025	February 19, 2025
3	Minnesota	4	April 27, 2025	November 21, 2025
3	New York	4	December 3, 2025	December 17, 2025
3	Toronto	4	December 30, 2026	January 6, 2026
3	Seattle	4	January 25, 2026	March 4, 2026
3	Seattle	4	Narch 11, 2026	March 21, 2026
3	New York	4	March 15, 2026	March 28, 2026
9	Ottawa	3	December 27, 2024	January 7, 2025
9	Toronto	3	January 10, 2024	January 17, 2024
9	Boston	3	March 26, 2025	April 2, 2025
9	New York	3	February 26, 2024	March 24, 2024
9	Montreal	3	March 8, 2024	March 17, 2024
9	New York	3	April 20, 2024	April 28, 2024
9	Toronto	3	December 24, 2024	January 8, 2025
9	Montreal	3	March 23, 2025	April 1, 2025
9	Toronto	3	January 20, 2026	January 28, 2026
9	Ottawa	3	April 1, 2026	April 3, 2026
9	Vancouver	3	April 1, 2026	April 7, 2026
9	Minnesota	3	April 25, 2026	April 22, 2026

- The most points earned in a ten-game stretch is 28, achieved twice by the Toronto Sceptres, most recently from January 26, 2024, to March 20, 2024
- The least points earned in a ten-game stretch is 4, achieved by the New York Sirens from March 3, 2024, to April 28, 2024.

== Team records (single season 30 game) ==
Through completion of 2025–26 season.

Most points
Rank	Team	Points	Season
1	Montreal Victoire	62	2025–26
1	Boston Fleet	62	2025–26
3	Montreal Victoire	53	2024–25
4	Minnesota Frost	50	2025–26
5	Toronto Sceptres	48	2024–25

Least points
Rank	Team	Points	Season
1	Seattle Torrent	31	2025–26
2	New York Sirens	37	2025–26
3	Vancouver Goldeneyes	37	2025–26
3	New York Sirens	37	2024–25
5	Toronto Sceptres	38	2025–26

Most regulation wins
Rank	Team	Regulation wins	Season
1	Montreal Victoire	16	2025–26
1	Boston Fleet	16	2025–26
3	Minnesota Frost	13	2025–26
4	Montreal Victoire	12	2024–25
4	Toronto Sceptres	12	2024–25
4	Ottawa Charge	12	2024–25
4	Minnesota Frost	12	2024–25

Most total wins
Rank	Team	Total wins	Season
1	Montreal Victoire	22	2025–26
2	Boston Fleet	21	2025–26
3	Montreal Victoire	19	2024–25
4	Ottawa Charge	17	2025–26
5	Minnesota Frost	16	2025–26

Most overtime games
Rank	Team	Overtime games	Season
1	Boston Fleet	11	2024–25
2	Montreal Victoire	10	2024–25
3	Boston Fleet	9	2025-25
3	Ottawa Charge	9	2025–26
3	Toronto Sceptres	9	2024–25
3	Minnesota Frost	9	2024–25
3	New York Sirens	9	2024–25

Most total losses
Rank	Team	Total losses	Season
1	Seattle Torrent	21	2025–26
2	Toronto Sceptres	19	2025–26
3	New York Sirens	18	2025–26
3	Vancouver Goldeneyes	18	2025–26
3	New York Sirens	18	2024–25

Most regulation losses
Rank	Team	Regulation losses	Season
1	Seattle Torrent	16	2025–26
2	New York Sirens	15	2025–26
3	Vancouver Goldeneyes	14	2025–26
4	Toronto Sceptres	13	2025–26
4	New York Sirens	13	2024–25

== Attendance ==
As of April 2026:

- Highest single match attendance (League and Canada arena records): 21,105 (Toronto at Montreal April 20, 2024)
- Highest single match attendance (U.S. arena): 18,006 (Seattle at New York April 4, 2026)
- Highest average attendance: 12,875 (Seattle Torrent for 2025–26 season)
