= Steve O'Rourke (ice hockey) =

Canadian ice hockey coach (born 1974)

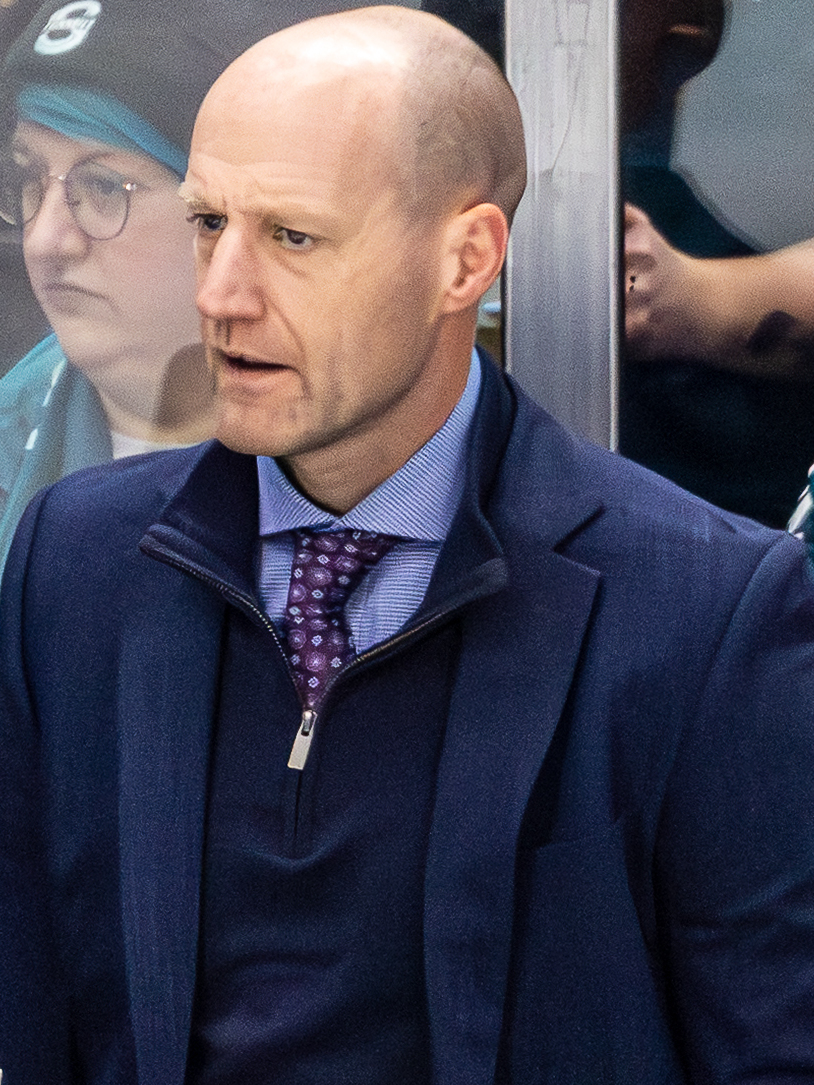
- O'Rourke in 2025

Biographical details
- Born: September 11, 1974 (age 52); Summerland, British Columbia, Canada

Coaching career (HC unless noted)
- 2009–2011: Abbotsford Heat (Assistant)
- 2011–2012: Langley Rivermen
- 2013–2016: Red Deer Rebels (Assistant)
- 2016–2022: Prince George Cougars (Associate HC)
- 2022–2024: Oshawa Generals (Associate HC)
- 2024–2025: Oshawa Generals
- 2025–2026: Seattle Torrent

Steve O'Rourke (born September 11, 1974) is a Canadian ice hockey coach and former professional ice hockey player. He is the former head coach for the Seattle Torrent of the Professional Women's Hockey League (PWHL).

== Playing career ==
O'Rourke began his ice hockey career with the Tri-City Americans of the Western Hockey League (WHL). He played two seasons and recorded six goals and 26 assists in 103 games. He was drafted by the New York Islanders in the seventh round of the 1992 NHL entry draft. He then played college ice hockey at the University of Lethbridge, and earned a degree in kinesiology and a Master of Business Administration in sport management.

Following college, he played three seasons for the Bracknell Bees, before joining the Mississippi Sea Wolves of the ECHL during the 2003–04 season. After one year in the ECHL, he played two seasons in the United Hockey League (UHL) for the Adirondack Frostbite, Muskegon Fury and Quad City Mallards before retiring in 2006.

== Coaching career ==
Steve O'Rourke began his coaching career as an assistant coach for the Abbotsford Heat of the American Hockey League (AHL), a position he held for two years. He then served as an assistant coach for the Red Deer Rebels of the WHL for three years.

On June 15, 2016, he was named an associate head coach for the Prince George Cougars of the WHL. On August 20, 2019, he was named Director of Player Development for the Cougars.

In September 2022, O'Rourke joined the Oshawa Generals as an associate head coach. On July 5, 2024, he was promoted to head coach for the 2024–25 season. He was relieved of his coaching duties on December 9, 2024.

On June 20, 2025, O'Rourke was named head coach of the Seattle Torrent. During the 2025–26 season, he led the Torrent to an 8–1–5–16 record. On May 22, 2026, he was fired by the Torrent after finishing last in the PWHL standings.

== Personal life ==
O'Rourke's brother, Dan, is a former ice hockey player and current National Hockey League (NHL) referee.
