= Josh Sciba =

American ice hockey coach (born 1985)

Current position
- Title: Head coach
- Team: Detroit Clutch
- Record: 0–0–0

Biographical details
- Born: February 6, 1985 (age 41); Westland, Michigan, U.S.
- Education: University of Notre Dame

Coaching career (HC unless noted)
- 2012–2016: Colgate (Assistant)
- 2016–2024: Union College
- 2024–2026: New York Sirens (Assistant)
- 2026–present: Detroit Clutch

Josh Sciba (born February 6, 1985) is an American ice hockey coach and retired ice hockey player. He is the current head coach for the Detroit Clutch of the Professional Women's Hockey League (PWHL).

== Playing career ==
Sciba played college ice hockey at Notre Dame. He recorded 72 points in 141 career games, and helped Notre Dame win the Central Collegiate Hockey Association (CCHA) regular season title and CCHA tournament championship in 2007.

== Coaching career ==
Sciba began his coaching career as an assistant coach for Colgate, a position he held from 2012 to 2016. On May 13, 2016, he was named the head coach for Union College. In eight seasons as head coach at Union College, he compiled a record of 45–177–17.

On May 28, 2026, he was named the inaugural head coach of the Detroit Clutch.

== Career statistics ==
=== Regular season and playoffs ===
| | | | Regular season | | | | | Playoffs |
| Season | Team | League | GP | G | A | Pts | PIM | GP | G | A | Pts | PIM |
|---|---|---|---|---|---|---|---|---|---|---|---|---|
| 2000–01 | Compuware Ambassadors | NAHL | 50 | 6 | 8 | 14 | 22 | — | — | — | — | — |
| 2001–02 | USNTDP Juniors | USHL | 3 | 0 | 0 | 0 | 0 | — | — | — | — | — |
| 2001–02 | U.S. National U18 Team | NAHL | 43 | 16 | 13 | 29 | 41 | — | — | — | — | — |
| 2002–03 | U.S. National U18 Team | NAHL | 8 | 2 | 2 | 4 | 2 | — | — | — | — | — |
| 2003–04 | University of Notre Dame | NCAA | 38 | 7 | 7 | 14 | 20 | — | — | — | — | — |
| 2004–05 | University of Notre Dame | NCAA | 35 | 6 | 4 | 10 | 12 | — | — | — | — | — |
| 2005–06 | University of Notre Dame | NCAA | 35 | 17 | 13 | 30 | 28 | — | — | — | — | — |
| 2006–07 | University of Notre Dame | NCAA | 33 | 8 | 10 | 18 | 18 | — | — | — | — | — |
| 2007–08 | Bakersfield Condors | ECHL | 4 | 1 | 0 | 1 | 2 | — | — | — | — | — |
| 2007–08 | Las Vegas Wranglers | ECHL | 22 | 6 | 1 | 7 | 8 | — | — | — | — | — |
| 2007–08 | Dayton Bombers | ECHL | 5 | 2 | 0 | 2 | 2 | — | — | — | — | — |
| ECHL totals | | | 31 | 9 | 1 | 10 | 12 | — | — | — | — | — |

=== International ===
| Year | Team | Event | Result | GP | G | A | Pts | PIM |
|---|---|---|---|---|---|---|---|---|
| 2002 | United States | U17 | 1st place, gold medalist(s) | 6 | 3 | 4 | 7 | 12 |
| 2003 | United States | U18 | 4th | 6 | 0 | 0 | 0 | 6 |
| Junior totals | | | | 12 | 3 | 4 | 7 | 18 |
