= Detroit Clutch =

PWHL ice hockey team in Detroit

- City: Detroit, Michigan
- League: PWHL
- Conference: Western
- Founded: 2026
- Home arena: Little Caesars Arena
- Colours: Black, silver, white and red
- Owner: Mark Walter Group
- General manager: Manon Rhéaume
- Head coach: Josh Sciba
- Asst. coaches: Danielle Goyette; Jimmy Howard
- Captain: Hilary Knight
- Media: WMYD (Scripps Sports)
- Website: www.thepwhl.com/en/teams/detroit-clutch

Championships
- Regular season titles: 0
- Walter Cups: 0

The Detroit Clutch are an upcoming professional ice hockey team based in Detroit that will compete in the Professional Women's Hockey League (PWHL). They are the league's third announced expansion franchise, part of the league's second round of expansions alongside the Hamilton Havoc, the San Jose Sea Lions, and the Vegas Vanguards, for the 2026–27 season. The Clutch will play home games at Little Caesars Arena.

== History ==
=== Founding ===
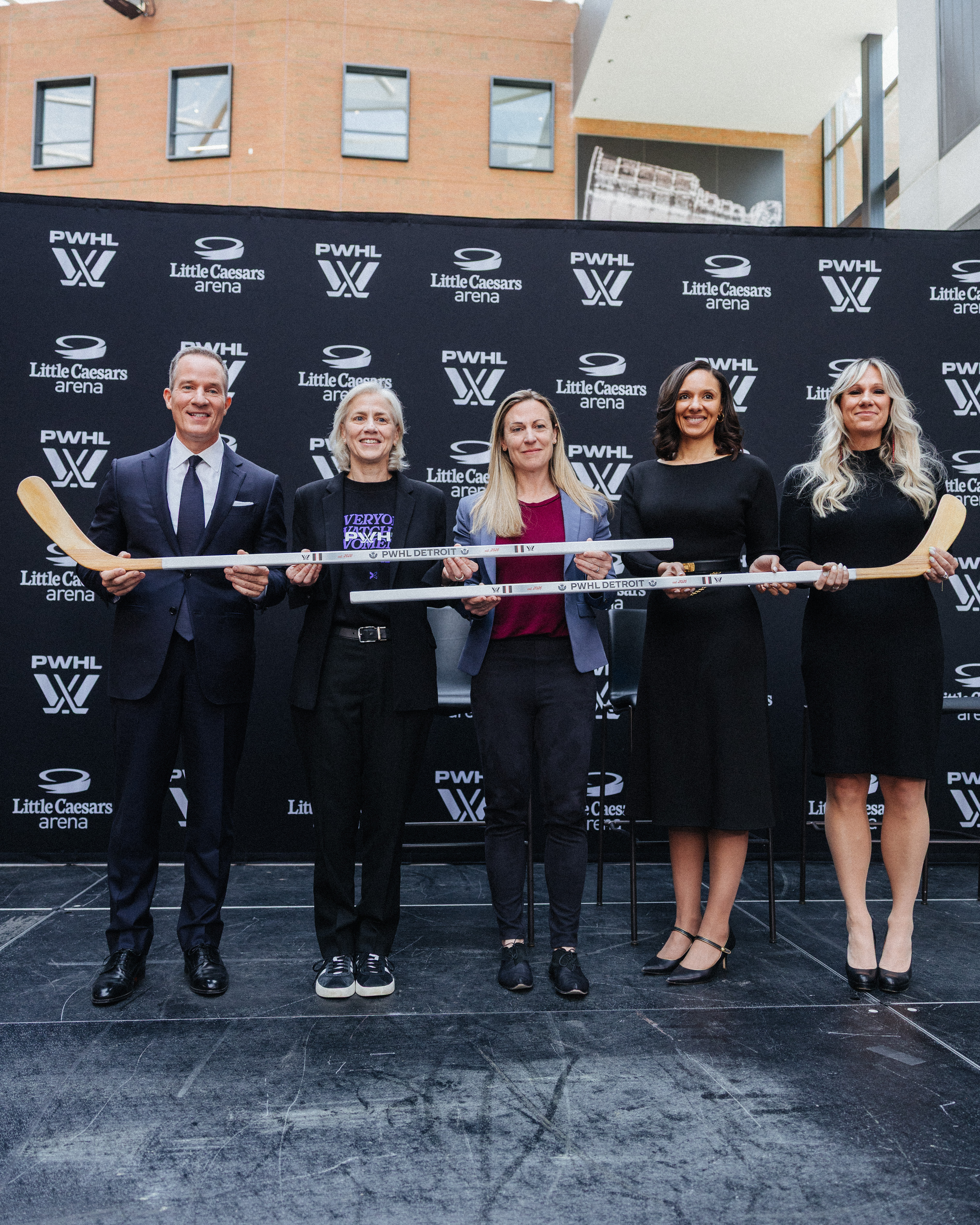
Detroit mayor Mary Sheffield, Christopher Ilitch, and PWHL executives at the team's launch event in May 2026

Detroit had been rumored to be getting a potential expansion team ever since it hosted the PWHL's very first neutral site game during their inaugural 2024 season, drawing 13,736 fans. In the subsequent two seasons, Detroit became the most frequent host city on the PWHL Takeover Tour, hosting three more games, including a then-American professional women's hockey attendance record of 14,288 on March 16, 2025. The fourth and final game culminated in a record professional women's hockey attendance at Little Caesars Arena of 15,938 on March 28, 2026.

The team's founding and entry into the league was announced on May 6. They will begin playing in the PWHL during the 2026–27 season.

The team is the league's ninth franchise overall and its third expansion team, part of the second round of expansion. The team will play its games at Little Caesars Arena, which is also the home of the Detroit Red Wings of the National Hockey League (NHL) and the Detroit Pistons of the National Basketball Association (NBA).

On May 15, the PWHL announced that Manon Rhéaume would be the general manager for the team. On May 28, the league announced the team had hired Josh Sciba as head coach.. On September 29, the team announced the hirings of Danielle Goyette as assistant coach, and Jimmy Howard as goaltending coach.

== Team identity ==
The PWHL Detroit logo used prior to the unveiling of the permanent team identity

As part of the expansion announcement, the team's colors were revealed to be black and silver, with white as a tertiary color and red as an accent color. Like all previous teams, the team temporarily operated as PWHL Detroit until a permanent team identity was decided.

On November 10, 2026, the Detroit Clutch name and logo was revealed. The name brings together Detroit's legacy of automotive innovation and the defining moments in sports when teams deliver under pressure, and the circular logo references a wheel and an automotive clutch. Vinyl lines inside the wheel are a nod to Motown's lasting influence, and the wordmark uses chrome, Art Deco-inspired lettering.

== Players and personnel ==
=== Current roster ===
As of July 27, 2026

No.	Nat	Player	Pos	S/G	Age	Acquired	Birthplace
11	(United States)	Sydney Bard	D	R	25	2026	New Hartford, New York
3	(United States)	Cayla Barnes	D	R	27	2026	Eastvale, California
19	(United States)	Hannah Bilka	F	L	25	2026	Coppell, Texas
4	(United States)	Mia Biotti	D	L	24	2026	Cambridge, Massachusetts
13	(United States)	Casey Borgiel	D	L	22	2026	Port Huron, Michigan
20	(Switzerland)	Andrea Brändli	G	L	29	2026	Wald, Zürich, Switzerland
25	(Canada)	Sena Catterall	F	L	24	2026	Montreal, Quebec
23	(United States)	Mellissa Channell-Watkins	D	L	31	2026	Plymouth, Michigan
18	(United States)	Jesse Compher (A)	F	R	27	2026	Northbrook, Illinois
77	(United States)	Britta Curl-Salemme	F	L	26	2026	Bismarck, North Dakota
27	(United States)	Shiann Darkangelo	F	L	32	2026	Brighton, Michigan
17	(United States)	Taylor Girard	F	L	28	2026	Macomb Township, Michigan
28	(Canada)	Nina Jobst-Smith	D	R	25	2026	North Vancouver, British Columbia
16	(Canada)	Kyla Josifovic	F	R	23	2026	Burlington, Ontario
21	(United States)	Hilary Knight (C)	F	R	37	2026	Palo Alto, California
8	(Canada)	Stephanie Markowski	D	L	25	2026	Edmonton, Alberta
47	(United States)	MK O'Brien	F	L	24	2026	Wilbraham, Massachusetts
32	(France)	Alice Philbert	G	L	30	2026	Saint-Bruno-de-Montarville, Quebec
2	(United States)	Georgia Schiff	F	L	22	2026	Montpelier, Vermont
71	(Japan)	Akane Shiga	F	R	25	2026	Obihiro, Hokkaido, Japan
14	(Canada)	Olivia Wallin	F	R	24	2026	Oakville, Ontario
9	(Canada)	Daryl Watts (A)	F	L	27	2026	Toronto, Ontario
