= MK O'Brien =

American ice hockey player (born 2002)

- Born: August 22, 2002 (age 24) Wilbraham, Massachusetts, U.S.
- Height: 5 ft 4 in (163 cm)
- Position: Forward
- Shoots: Left
- PWHL team: Detroit Clutch
- Playing career: 2021–present

Mary Kate O'Brien (born August 22, 2002) is an American professional ice hockey forward for the Detroit Clutch of the Professional Women's Hockey League (PWHL). She played college ice hockey at Minnesota Duluth.

== Playing career ==
=== College ===
O'Brien began her college ice hockey career for Minnesota Duluth during the 2021–22 season. She was injured after three games, and granted a redshirt season. During the 2022–23 season, in her red-shirt freshman year, she recorded five goals and two assists in 39 games. During the 2023–24 season, in her red-shirt sophomore year, she recorded seven goals and seven assists in 39 games. During the 2024–25 season, in her red-shirt junior year, she served as alternate captain and recorded seven goals and 18 assists in 39 games. During the 2025–26 season, in her red-shirt senior year, she served as team captain and recorded three goals and 14 assists in 38 games. Following the season she was awarded the Outstanding Student-Athlete of the Year.

=== Professional ===
On June 17, 2026, O'Brien was drafted in the third round, 34th overall, by the Detroit Clutch in the 2026 PWHL Draft.

== Career statistics ==
			Regular season					Playoffs
Season	Team	League	GP	G	A	Pts	PIM	GP	G	A	Pts	PIM
2021–22	University of Minnesota Duluth	WCHA	7	0	1	1	2	—	—	—	—	—
2022–23	University of Minnesota Duluth	WCHA	39	5	2	7	4	—	—	—	—	—
2023–24	University of Minnesota Duluth	WCHA	39	7	7	14	13	—	—	—	—	—
2024–25	University of Minnesota Duluth	WCHA	39	7	19	26	18	—	—	—	—	—
2025–26	University of Minnesota Duluth	WCHA	38	3	14	17	10	—	—	—	—	—
NCAA totals			162	22	43	65	47	—	—	—	—	—
