= Seattle Torrent =

PWHL ice hockey team in Seattle

- City: Seattle, Washington
- League: PWHL
- Conference: Western
- Founded: 2025
- Home arena: Climate Pledge Arena
- Colors: Slate green, river blue, glacier blue, foam, haze grey, basalt black
- Owner: Mark Walter Group
- General manager: Meghan Turner
- Head coach: Christine Bumstead
- Captain: Alex Carpenter
- Website: thepwhl.com/en/teams/seattle-torrent

Championships
- Regular season titles: 0
- Walter Cups: 0

The Seattle Torrent are a professional ice hockey team based in Seattle that competes in the Professional Women's Hockey League (PWHL). They began play in the 2025–26 season, as did the Vancouver Goldeneyes, the PWHL's first two expansion teams. The Torrent are part of the league's Western Conference and plays home games at Climate Pledge Arena, which is also home to the Seattle Kraken of the National Hockey League.

== History ==
Seattle had been considered for a potential PWHL expansion team and hosted a league game during the Takeover Tour in January 2025. The Boston Fleet played the Montreal Victoire at Seattle's Climate Pledge Arena and drew a crowd of 12,608. Seattle also previously held the record for the highest attendance at a non-college women's hockey game in the United States, having drawn 14,551 for a Rivalry Series game between the United States and Canada women's national teams in 2022.

The PWHL announced their expansion to Seattle on April 30, 2025. The Seattle team is the eighth franchise in the league and second expansion team, part of the league's first round of expansion alongside the Vancouver Goldeneyes. The team began play in the 2025–26 season. They play their home games at Climate Pledge Arena, shared with the Seattle Kraken of the National Hockey League and Seattle Storm of the WNBA. The team's colors, emerald green and cream, are described as similar to the Storm's. The Kraken, who were part of the bidding group alongside arena operator Oak View Group, assist the PWHL team in marketing and business operations. On June 20, 2025, former Oshawa Generals head coach, Steve O'Rourke, was named the team's inaugural coach, and on November 14, Hilary Knight was named the inaugural team captain.

The Torrent's first game was hosted by their fellow expansion team, the Vancouver Goldeneyes, at Pacific Coliseum in Vancouver, British Columbia, on November 21. The team lost 4–3 in overtime; the first two goals for the Torrent were scored by Julia Gosling. The team's inaugural home game at Climate Pledge Arena drew 16,014 spectators, the largest attendance for a women's hockey game in the United States, and the visiting Minnesota Frost won 3–0. The Torrent earned their first win in franchise history in their third game, a 2–1 victory at home against the New York Sirens on December 3. On April 4, 2026, the team played the New York Sirens in the inaugural PWHL game at Madison Square Garden in New York City, which broke the record for attendance at a U.S. professional Women's hockey game with a total of 18,006 attendees, and sold out the iconic venue. The Torrent finished the season with an average attendance of 12,875, ranking first in the league.

== Team identity ==
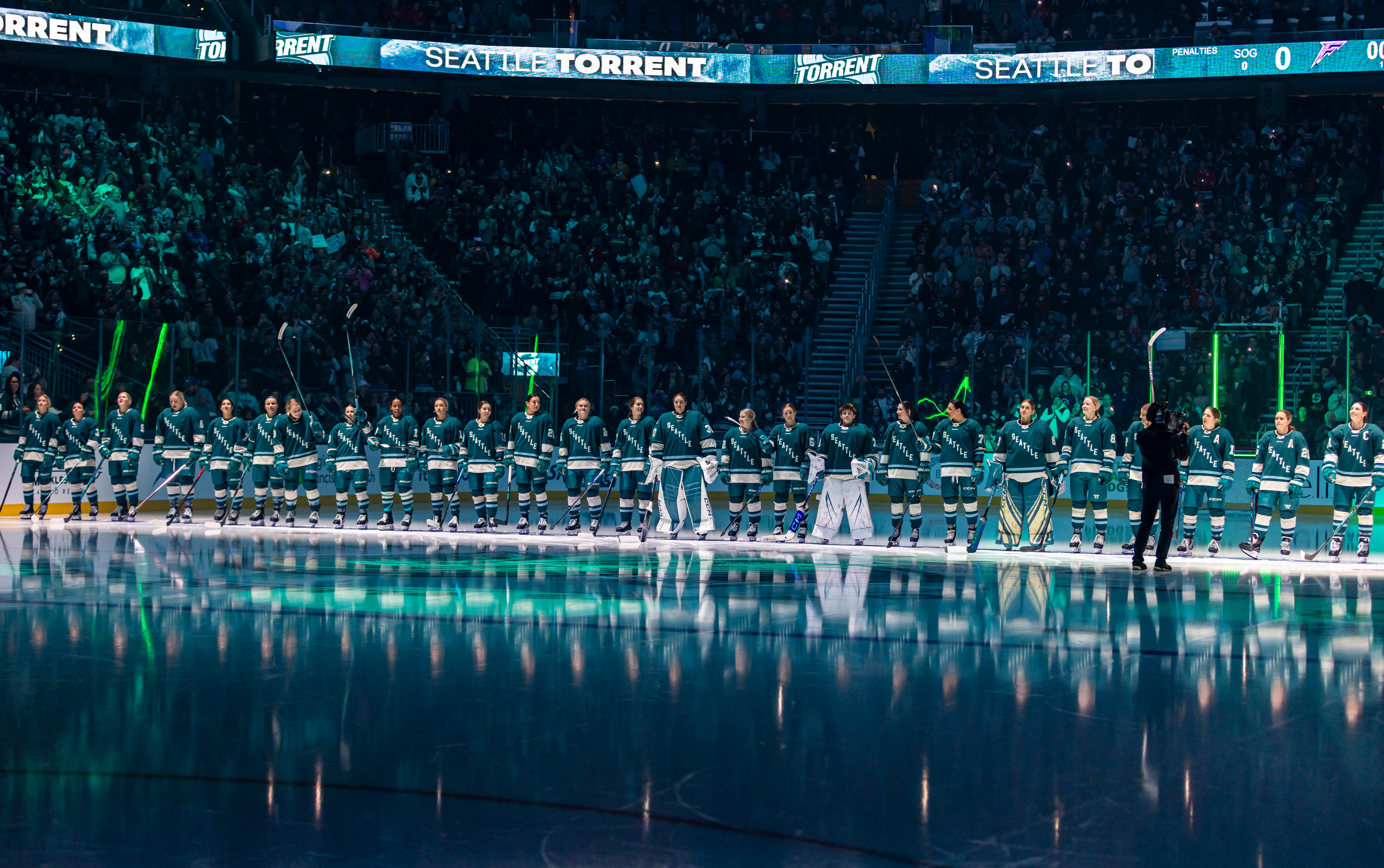
The Seattle Torrent in 2025 with the stadium lit up in team colors

As part of the expansion announcement, the team's initial colors were revealed to be emerald green and cream. Like the original six teams of the PWHL did during the 2023–24 PWHL season, the team temporarily operated as PWHL Seattle during the 2025 offseason, until the Torrent name was announced. The team is expected to have a rivalry with the Vancouver Goldeneyes, their nearest competitor.

On October 21, 2025, Seattle released their inaugural season jerseys, which feature the city name diagonally across the front without a team name or logo. The jerseys are produced by Bauer. Seattle recorded the highest single-day sales of a jersey in PWHL history.

The team's name and identity, the Seattle Torrent, were officially unveiled on November 6, 2025. The team's colors are inspired by the landscape and seascape of the Pacific Northwest: slate green (a dark teal), river blue (a blue-grey), glacier blue (an icier blue-grey), foam (a sandy cream), haze grey, and basalt black. After goals at home, Climate Pledge Arena plays "Misery Business" by Paramore.

== Arena ==
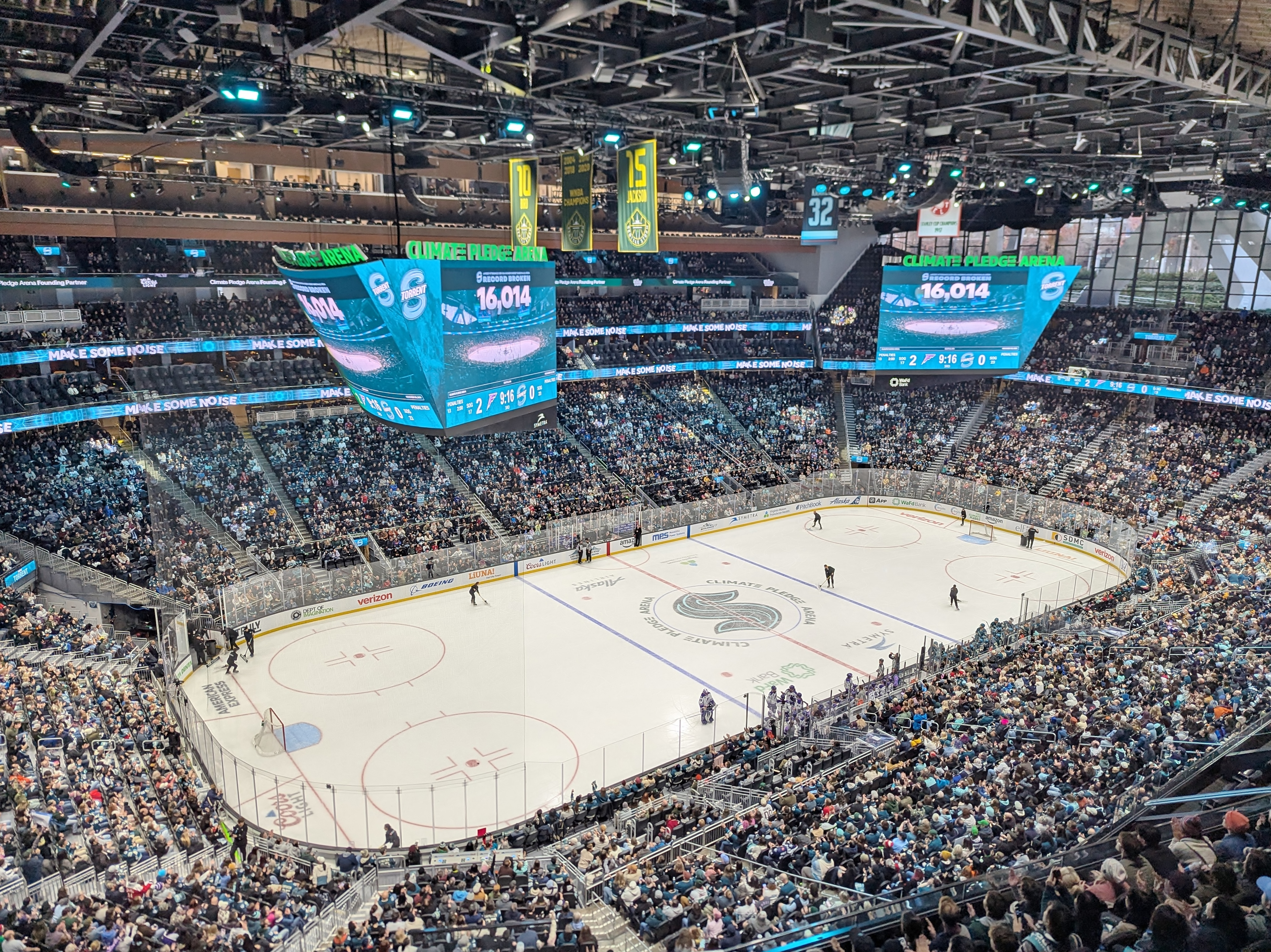
Climate Pledge Arena, pictured in its debut for the Torrent

The team plays home games at Climate Pledge Arena, which it shares with the Seattle Kraken of the National Hockey League and Seattle Storm of the WNBA. It has a seating capacity of 17,151, making it the second-largest arena in the PWHL by capacity. The team's training facility is the Kraken Community Iceplex in the Northgate neighborhood of Seattle, which it also shares with the Kraken.

== Season-by-season record ==
Key of colours and symbols
| Colour/symbol | Explanation |
|---|---|
| † | Indicates league championship |
| * | Indicates regular season championship |

Year by year results
| Season | GP | RW | OW | OL | RL | Pts | GF | GA | GD | Finish | Playoffs |
|---|---|---|---|---|---|---|---|---|---|---|---|
| 2025–26 | 30 | 8 | 1 | 5 | 16 | 31 | 64 | 92 | −28 | 8th | Did not qualify |

== Players and personnel ==
=== Current roster ===
As of September 30, 2026

| No. | Nat | Player | Pos | S/G | Age | Acquired | Birthplace |
|---|---|---|---|---|---|---|---|
| 78 | (Canada) | Lexie Adzija | F | L | 26 | 2025 | St. Thomas, Ontario |
| 11 | (United States) | Emily Brown (A) | D | L | 27 | 2025 | Blaine, Minnesota |
| 25 | (United States) | Alex Carpenter (A) | F | L | 32 | 2025 | North Reading, Massachusetts |
| 8 | (Canada) | Gabrielle David | F | R | 27 | 2026 | Drummondville, Quebec |
| 7 | (United States) | Lily Delianedis | F | L | 25 | 2025 | Edina, Minnesota |
| 1 | (Italy) | Gabriella Durante | G | L | 25 | 2026 | Calgary, Alberta |
| 26 | (Canada) | Grace Elliott | F | L | 23 | 2026 | Cloverdale, British Columbia |
| 88 | (Canada) | Julia Gosling | F | L | 25 | 2025 | London, Ontario |
| 77 | (Canada) | Gracie Gilkyson | D | L | 23 | 2026 | Calgary, Alberta |
| 13 | (Canada) | Mikyla Grant-Mentis | F | L | 28 | 2025 | Brampton, Ontario |
| 70 | (Canada) | Carly Jackson | G | R | 29 | 2025 | Amherst, Nova Scotia |
| 12 | (Canada) | Emerson Jarvis | F | R | 22 | 2026 | Mundare, Alberta |
| 24 | (United States) | Lyndie Lobdell | D | R | 24 | 2025 | Aurora, Illinois |
| 32 | (United States) | Sydney Morrow | D | R | 22 | 2026 | Darien, Connecticut |
| 18 | (United States) | Abbey Murphy | F | R | 24 | 2026 | Evergreen Park, Illinois |
| 83 | (Canada) | Hannah Murphy | G | R | 23 | 2025 | Kingston, Ontario |
| 28 | (Czech Republic) | Noemi Neubauerová | D | R | 26 | 2026 | Prague, Czechia |
| 61 | (Finland) | Emma Nuutinen | F | L | 29 | 2026 | Vantaa, Finland |
| 37 | (Austria) | Theresa Schafzahl | F | L | 26 | 2026 | Weiz, Austria |
| 92 | (Canada) | Danielle Serdachny | F | R | 25 | 2025 | Edmonton, Alberta |
| 2 | (Czech Republic) | Aneta Tejralová | D | L | 30 | 2025 | Prague, Czechia |
| 5 | (United States) | Anna Wilgren | D | L | 27 | 2025 | Hudson, Wisconsin |

=== Reserves ===
As of April 16, 2026

| No. | Nat | Player | Pos | S/G | Age | Acquired | Birthplace |
|---|---|---|---|---|---|---|---|
| 66 | (United States) | Marah Wagner | F | L | 26 | 2025 | Seattle, Washington |
| 6 | (United States) | Emily Zumwinkle | D | R | 23 | 2025 | Excelsior, Minnesota |

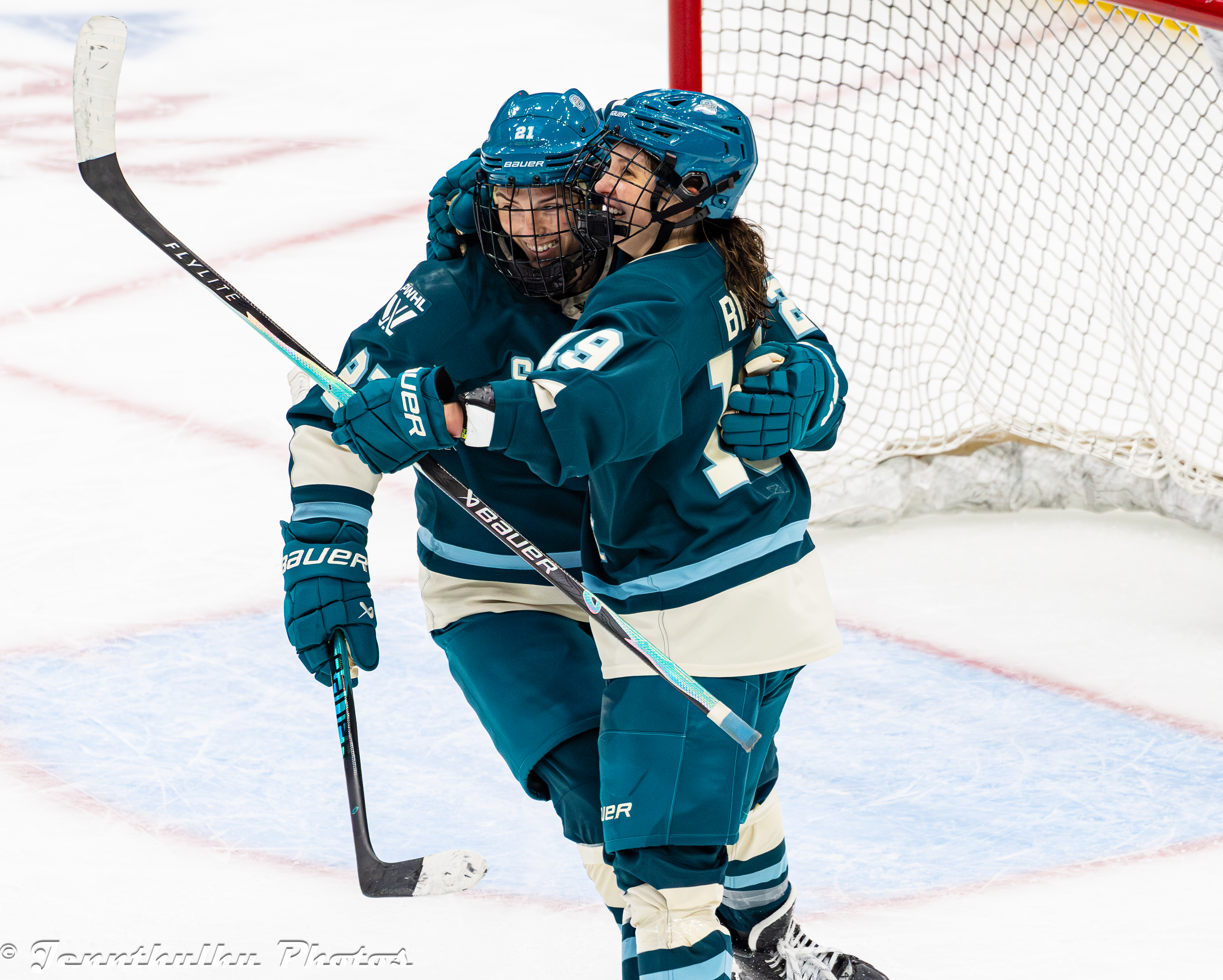
Captain Hilary Knight and forward Hannah Bilka hug in celebration.

=== Team captains ===
- Hilary Knight, 2025–2026

=== Head coaches ===
- Steve O'Rourke, 2025–2026
- Christine Bumstead, 2026–present

=== Assistant coaches ===
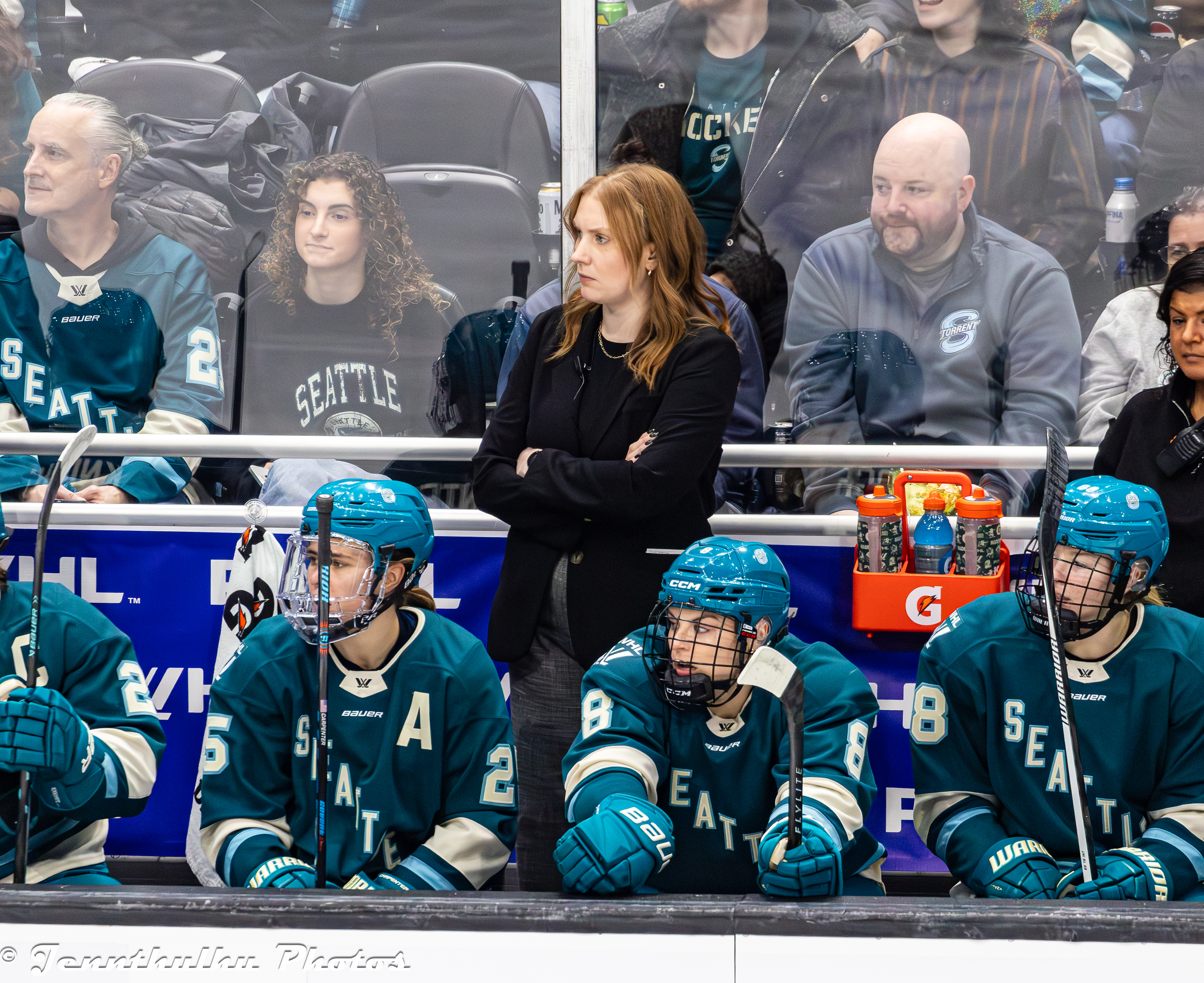
Assistant Coach Christine Bumstead

- Christine Bumstead, 2025–2026
- Clayton Beddoes, 2025–present
- Stephanie McKeough, 2026–present
- Brett Sonne, 2026–present

=== First-round draft picks ===
- 2025: Jenna Buglioni (8th overall)
- 2026: Abbey Murphy (2nd overall)

== Broadcasting ==
The team announced agreements with KZJO (Fox 13+) and KONG to broadcast its games on television, with the majority of games airing on KZJO and six airing on KONG. All PWHL games also air live on the league's YouTube channel. Torrent announcers Alison Lukan and Piper Shaw also broadcast for the Kraken.
