= Professional Women's Hockey League =

North American ice hockey league

Professional Women's Hockey League Ligue professionnelle de hockey féminin
- Upcoming season or competition: 2026–27 PWHL season
- Sport: Ice hockey
- First season: 2024
- Owner: Mark Walter Group
- No. of teams: 12
- Countries: Canada (5 teams); United States (7 teams)
- Most recent champion: Montreal Victoire (1st) (2025–26)
- Most titles: Minnesota Frost (2)
- Broadcasters: Canada: CBC; Sportsnet; TSN; United States: Scripps Sports; Ion Television
- Website: www.thepwhl.com

The Professional Women's Hockey League (PWHL; French: Ligue professionnelle de hockey féminin, LPHF) is a professional women's ice hockey league in North America composed of twelve teams, seven in the United States and five in Canada. Launched in 2023, the PWHL is the only professional women's hockey league in North America. The teams play a regular season to earn one of eight places in the playoffs, and the winner of the playoffs is awarded the Walter Cup.

In 2019, after the collapse of the Canadian Women's Hockey League, the Professional Women's Hockey Players Association (PWHPA) formed to advocate for the formation of a "single, viable professional women's ice hockey league in North America." PWHPA members boycotted existing leagues while organizing exhibition games to showcase women's hockey talent and fundraise for their cause, while working to secure new partnerships. In 2022, the PWHPA entered into an agreement with the Mark Walter Group and Billie Jean King Enterprises to establish a new professional women's hockey league. Following the Premier Hockey Federation's (PHF) 2022–23 season, the Mark Walter Group acquired the assets of the PHF and announced that a new women's hockey league would be launched in 2024. The PWHL's first draft took place in September 2023, and its first season began in January 2024. The PWHL continues to be wholly owned and operated by the Mark Walter Group.

PWHL rules are modelled off of National Hockey League rules, with significant innovations. The PWHL uses a 3-2-1-0 points system during the regular season, with three points awarded for a regulation win, two points for an overtime or shootout win, one point for an overtime or shootout loss, and zero points for a regulation loss. Once teams are eliminated from playoff contention, their regular season points go towards the "Gold plan" for choosing the top pick in the following entry draft. A short-handed goal leads to a termination of a penalty, or "jailbreak". Unlike most other women's hockey leagues and IIHF games, the PWHL allows bodychecking, albeit with more restrictions than the NHL.

The league's games are streamed on YouTube internationally, excluding Canada. In Canada, they are broadcast by CBC/Radio-Canada, TSN and its French-language affiliate RDS, Amazon Prime Video, and Sportsnet. In the United States, they are broadcast by regional sports networks based in each U.S. city with a team. Nova Sport broadcasts select PWHL games in the Czech Republic and Slovakia.

== History ==
=== Antecedents and the PWHPA ===
Top-level and professional women's hockey in North America has developed in starts and stops since the late twentieth century. The National Women's Hockey League (NWHL) launched in 1999, featuring teams mainly in Ontario and Quebec. Some teams from Western Canada competed intermittently, but those teams congregated in the Western Women's Hockey League when it formed in 2004. The Canadian Women's Hockey League (CWHL) effectively replaced the NWHL and absorbed the western league, ultimately running for twelve seasons, from 2007 to 2019, with teams competing for the Clarkson Cup. The CWHL, which operated on a non-profit basis, did not pay player salaries, but it did at times offer stipends and bonuses as it aspired to become a professional league. However, the league lacked financial stability and it abruptly folded in 2019. A new National Women's Hockey League—later renamed the Premier Hockey Federation (PHF)—which did offer player salaries, was established in the United States in 2015, before expanding into Canada in 2020. However, after the dissolution of the CWHL, hundreds of prominent women's players, including Canadian and American Olympians, founded the Professional Women's Hockey Players' Association (PWHPA) and opted to boycott existing leagues in pursuit of a unified, financially stable professional league. In the meantime, the PWHPA attracted partnerships with corporate sponsors and National Hockey League teams, organizing exhibition tournaments to generate support for their goal.

In 2022, the PWHPA entered a partnership with the Mark Walter Group and BJK Enterprises—led by Los Angeles Dodgers owner Mark Walter and Billie Jean King, respectively—with the intent to launch a new professional league. In 2023, the two business partners purchased the assets of the PHF, which ceased operations. The PWHPA negotiated a collective bargaining agreement ahead of the launch of the new professional league the union had been working towards.

=== Founding and inaugural season ===
The establishment of the Professional Women's Hockey League (PWHL) was announced by the Mark Walter Group in August 2023, along with the location of its six charter teams: Boston, Minneapolis–St. Paul, Montreal, New York City, Ottawa, and Toronto. Teams began constructing their rosters that summer, with an initial ten-day free agency period to sign three players. Emily Clark, Brianne Jenner, and Emerance Maschmeyer became the league's first players when they signed with Ottawa. The inaugural draft took place in September at the Canadian Broadcasting Centre in Toronto, where Minnesota chose Taylor Heise as the first pick in a fifteen-round, ninety-player draft from a pool of 286 eligible players. The league announced that, due to time constraints, the teams would not be given nicknames until after the inaugural season, and would wear jerseys featuring the name of the teams' locales in a diagonal wordmark.

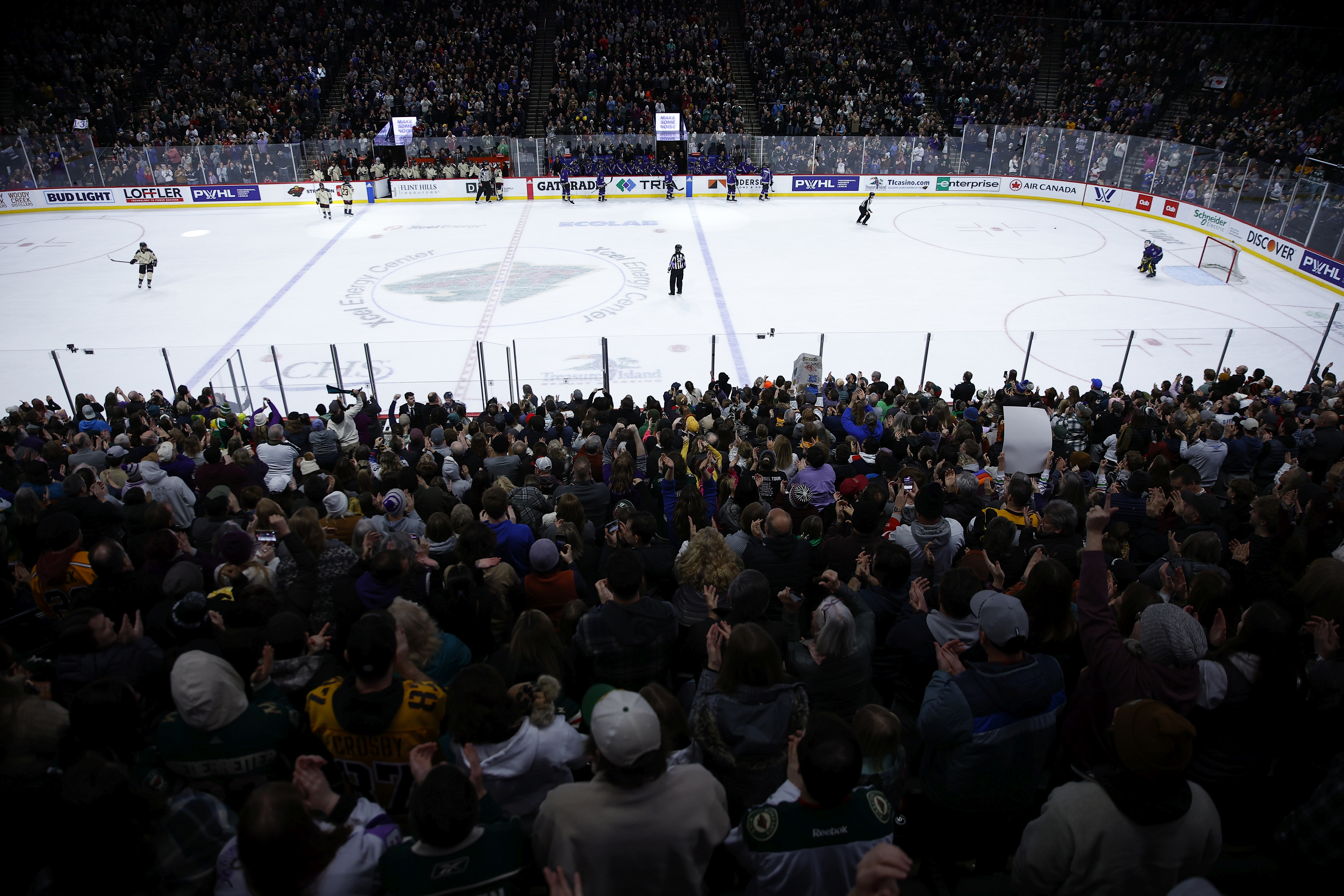
Minnesota's first home game was one of four during the first season that set professional women's ice hockey attendance records.

Prior to the start of the inaugural season, all six teams congregated at the Utica University Nexus Center in early December for a five-day evaluation camp, including scrimmages used to experiment with new rules. The first game took place on January 1, 2024, when Toronto hosted New York at the Mattamy Athletic Centre. New York's Ella Shelton scored the league's first goal en route to a 4–0 win. The game's Canadian television audience of 2.9 million viewers was the largest for a sports or entertainment broadcast that day, beating the 2024 NHL Winter Classic. The attendance record for a professional women's ice hockey match would be set multiple times during the ensuing season: 8,318 at Ottawa's first home game at TD Place Arena on January 2; 13,316 at Minnesota's first home game at the Xcel Energy Center on January 6; 19,285 at the inaugural Battle on Bay Street at Scotiabank Arena on February 16; and 21,105 at the Duel at the Top at the Bell Centre on April 20. The latter two drew the largest ever crowds for women's ice hockey, surpassing the 18,013 that watched Canada play Finland at the 2013 Women's World Championship.

Toronto finished atop the standings at the end of the inaugural season—they chose to play fourth place Minnesota in the first round of the playoffs, leaving Montreal and Boston to play the other series. Minnesota defeated Toronto in a five-game series, while Boston defeated Montreal in three straight games, with every decision coming in overtime. In the final, Minnesota defeated Boston in a five-game series to capture the first Walter Cup championship. Natalie Spooner was the league's first scoring champion and the inaugural winner of the league's Billie Jean King Most Valuable Player award, while Taylor Heise led the playoffs in scoring and was given postseason MVP honours.

=== Growth and expansion ===
Prior to the start of the 2024–25 season, the league announced that it was exploring expansion, opening up a process for proposals and stating that it would ultimately look to add two new teams when possible; by November 2024, the league had received more than two dozen expansion proposals. On April 18, 2025, reports suggested that the first new expansion team would be in Vancouver, with Seattle reportedly a top choice for the second. On April 23, 2025, the league announced that Vancouver would receive the first expansion team in league history, with the team playing home games at the Pacific Coliseum beginning in the 2025–26 season. One week later, on April 30, the league announced that Seattle would receive the second expansion team for the 2025–26 season, with the team playing home games at Climate Pledge Arena, home of the NHL's Seattle Kraken, who will have a supporting role with the team after supporting its expansion bid. On May 26 2025, the Minnesota Frost defended their title, becoming the first team in league history to win the Walter Cup twice.

The PWHL saw historic growth during the 2025–26 season, with attendance increasing by 35% over the previous season. Global News reported that the league saw over 100% growth in both sales and YouTube views, citing the 2026 Milano-Cortina Olympics as a driver. On May 6, 2026, the PWHL announced they would be expanding to include a team in Detroit for the 2026–27 season. A week later, on May 13, two additional teams in Hamilton and Las Vegas were announced. On May 19, another team in San Jose was announced, bringing the total number of teams in the league up to 12. On May 20, the Montréal Victoire became the first Canadian team to win the Walter Cup.

In June 2026, the PWHL announced its first outside investors, Ilitch Holdings and Kilmer Sports Ventures, with the latter reportedly investing $100 million and both taking on advisory roles.

== Organization ==
The PWHL and all of its teams are owned by the Mark Walter Group. The advisory board of the PWHL is formed by Billie Jean King, Ilana Kloss, Stan Kasten, and Royce Cohen. Jayna Hefford is the Senior Vice President of Hockey Operations and Amy Scheer is the Senior Vice President of Business Operations. Former hockey player and broadcaster Cassie Campbell-Pascall is an advisor to the Board. The league hired over 100 staff members to support league operations, distinguishing it from past women's hockey leagues that have lacked such operational support.

The PWHPA organized a formal players' union in early 2023—the PWHL Players Association (PWHLPA)—that became the players' union representing all PWHL players. Unique to professional women's hockey, the PWHL established an eight-year collective bargaining agreement (CBA) with the players' union. The CBA establishes that each team must sign at least six players to a minimum salary of $80,000, with a specific requirement that no more than nine players may be paid the league minimum salary of $35,000. Teams are also instructed to achieve an average salary of $55,000. The CBA was negotiated in United States Dollars (USD), with the average salary of $55,000 being above the US Living Wage. The base and average salaries are slated to increase 3% per season through the end of the agreement in 2031. The CBA further outlines performance and team bonuses, including a $63,250 bonus for the championship-winning team, and other financial incentives, including housing stipends. Brian Burke acts as the executive director of the players' union.

== Format and rules ==
Pos	Team	W	OTW	OTL	L	Pts
1	A	0	1	2	0	4
2	B	1	0	0	2	3
Example of the 3-2-1-0 system: A leads B, as A earned points for their overtime losses (green), while B earned no points for their regulation losses (red).

The inaugural PWHL season consisted of a 24-game schedule lasting from January to May. For the 2024–25 season, the schedule comprised 30 games played from November to May, with each team facing the other five teams six times each. The schedule included a mid-season break during the annual IIHF World Women's Championship in April. For the 2025–26 season, the schedule again comprised 30 games played, with each team facing the other seven teams a minimum of four times. The schedule included a mid-season break for the Winter Olympics.

A 3-2-1-0 points system is used for classification, whereby a team is awarded 3 points for a regulation win, 2 for an overtime or shootout win, and 1 for an overtime or shootout loss. At the end of the regular season, the best four teams qualify for a postseason tournament that determines the champion, comprising two semi-finals and a final played as best-of-five series. The team with the most points at the end of the regular season chooses their opponent from the other three qualifying teams, while the two remaining teams play each other. The PWHL utilizes the Gold Plan, a drafting system designed to prevent tanking, in which points scored in the games following a team's elimination from playoff contention count as draft order points, and the team with the most Gold Plan points is allotted the first pick in the draft for the next season. The teams compete for the Walter Cup, a trophy named after the league's financial backers, the Walter family.

PWHL rules closely follow National Hockey League and International Ice Hockey Federation (IIHF) standards, with some notable innovations. A "jailbreak" rule allows a team to terminate a minor penalty against by scoring a short-handed goal. During best-of-five shootouts, any player is eligible to shoot at any time, including taking multiple attempts. Like the Swedish Women's Hockey League, the PWHL breaks women's ice hockey and IIHF conventions and allows body checking, with the rule-book outlining that checking is permissible "when there is a clear intention of playing the puck or attempting to 'gain possession' of the puck", allowed principally along the boards. League executive Jayna Hefford has stated that body checking was included at the behest of the players. There are two main factors which determine the legality of a body check. The first is being able to determine whether or not gaining possession of the puck is the sole purpose of the player initiating the body check—a blatant example of an illegal body check would be if a player is across the ice from the puck, and they initiate a body check against another player. The second factor is the movement of players. Under rule 52.1, "a player who is stationary is entitled to that area of the ice. It is up to the opponent to avoid body contact with such a player." If a player were to initiate a body check on a player who is stationary and without the puck, there would be grounds for a referee to assess a penalty.

Prior to the 2024–25 season, the league announced the introduction of the "No Escape Rule", whereby when a team takes a penalty, all of the penalized team's players must remain on the ice until after the ensuing faceoff; this rule is similar to the existing rule which keeps players on the ice after their team ices the puck.

== Teams ==
=== Current teams ===
As of the 2026–27 season, twelve teams compete in the league, the original six (Montreal Victoire, Ottawa Charge, and Toronto Sceptres from Canada, and Boston Fleet, Minnesota Frost, and New York Sirens from the United States) as well as expansion teams Detroit Clutch, Hamilton Havoc, Vegas Vanguards, San Jose Sea Lions, Seattle Torrent, and Vancouver Goldeneyes. The six original clubs have been described as the league's own "Original Six" and by the PWHL as its "Inaugural Six". The teams' locations were chosen for being markets of National Hockey League franchises with "track records of supporting hockey and, specifically, the women's game." The teams are located in five of the seven Premier Hockey Federation markets—the Buffalo Beauts and Connecticut Whale were not given PWHL replacements, while Ottawa gained a team. Pittsburgh, Washington, D.C., and London, Ontario, were also considered for inaugural teams.

Potential team nicknames were registered with the United States Patent and Trademark Office in October 2023: Boston Wicked, Minnesota Superior, Montreal Echo, New York Sound, Ottawa Alert, and Toronto Torch. However, the league ultimately opted to forgo unique club identities for the inaugural season, emphasizing league branding instead. This meant that teams lacked nicknames, crests, and stylized jerseys, and were identified by their city. On September 9, 2024, ahead of the league's second season, team names and logos were announced, with none of them matching the trademarked names from 2023: the Boston Fleet, Minnesota Frost, Montreal Victoire, New York Sirens, Ottawa Charge, and Toronto Sceptres.

Some teams experimented with multiple venues during the inaugural season, and the league also organized a number of neutral-site games. As of the 2026–27 season, Detroit plays its home games at the Little Caesars Arena, the largest-capacity venue in the league at 19,515 seats. Boston hosts games at Agganis Arena at Boston University, after having played three seasons at Tsongas Center at the University of Massachusetts Lowell; Montreal at Place Bell in Laval, Ottawa at TD Place Arena in Lansdowne Park, Toronto at Coca-Cola Coliseum, and Vancouver at Pacific Coliseum. The league has presented one-off games at other large venues, including the Bell Centre in Montreal and Scotiabank Arena in Toronto in games dubbed the "Duel at the Top" and "Battle on Bay Street" rivalry games between Montreal and Toronto. Other one-off game venues have included Little Caesars Arena in Detroit, PPG Paints Arena in Pittsburgh, and the Prudential Center in Newark. In November 2024, the league announced the PWHL Takeover Tour for the 2024–25 season that would see teams play nine neutral site games in Seattle, Denver, Buffalo, Raleigh, Detroit, St. Louis, Quebec City, Vancouver, and Edmonton—three of those markets were later granted expansion teams. The league suggested that it would consider games in Europe in future seasons, and repeated the neutral site Takeover Tour for the 2025–26 season.

In October 2026, the league announced a conference structure for the 2026–27 season. The league will be split into two conferences, each with 6 teams: the Western Conference (Vancouver, Seattle, San Jose, Las Vegas, Minnesota, Detroit) and the Eastern Conference (Hamilton, Toronto, Ottawa, New York, Montreal, Boston).

Professional Women's Hockey League teams
Conference	Team	Location	Venue	Capacity	General manager	Head coach	Captain	Founded
Eastern Conference	Boston Fleet	Boston, Massachusetts	Agganis Arena	6,150	Danielle Marmer	François Méthot	Megan Keller	2023
Eastern Conference	Hamilton Havoc	Hamilton, Ontario	TD Coliseum	16,386	Meghan Duggan	Kris Sparre	Vacant	2026
Eastern Conference	Montreal Victoire	Laval, Quebec	Place Bell	10,172	Danièle Sauvageau	Kori Cheverie	Marie-Philip Poulin	2023
Eastern Conference	New York Sirens	Newark, New Jersey	Prudential Center	16,514	Pascal Daoust	Greg Fargo	Micah Zandee-Hart	2023
Eastern Conference	Ottawa Charge	Kanata, Ontario	Canadian Tire Centre	17,010	Michael Hirshfeld	Carla MacLeod	Jocelyne Larocque	2023
Eastern Conference	Toronto Sceptres	Toronto, Ontario	Coca-Cola Coliseum	8,100	Gina Kingsbury	Pascal Rhéaume	Blayre Turnbull	2023
Western Conference	Detroit Clutch	Detroit, Michigan	Little Caesars Arena	19,515	Manon Rhéaume	Josh Sciba	Hilary Knight	2026
Western Conference	Minnesota Frost	Saint Paul, Minnesota	Grand Casino Arena	17,954	Melissa Caruso	Ken Klee	Kendall Coyne Schofield	2023
Western Conference	San Jose Sea Lions	San Jose, California	SAP Center	17,435	Troy Ryan	Troy Ryan	Vacant	2026
Western Conference	Seattle Torrent	Seattle, Washington	Climate Pledge Arena	17,151	Meghan Turner	Christine Bumstead	Alex Carpenter	2025
Western Conference	Vancouver Goldeneyes	Vancouver, British Columbia	Pacific Coliseum	15,041	Alison Izzi	Cara Gardner Morey	Ashton Bell	2025
Western Conference	Vegas Vanguards	Paradise, Nevada	T-Mobile Arena	17,500	Dominique DiDia	Kim Weiss	Erin Ambrose	2026

=== All-Stars ===
For its inaugural season, the PWHL announced that it would collaborate with the National Hockey League on its All-Star festivities, intending to host its own All-Star game in future seasons. PWHL All-Stars participated in the "PWHL 3-on-3 Showcase" on February 1 during the 2024 NHL All-Star weekend in Toronto; it featured 24 PWHL players divided between Team King and Team Kloss—named after Billie Jean King and Ilana Kloss, respectively—coached by Cassie Campbell-Pascall and Meghan Duggan.

In September 2026, the PWHL announced its first league-hosted All-Star weekend, to take place in Toronto on March 7, 2027. It will feature a 3-on-3, round-robin tournament consisting of four teams: PWHL Canada, PWHL International, PWHL USA, and PWHL Rookies.

== Season overviews ==
PWHL seasons
Season	Teams	Team awards		Individual awards			
Season	Teams	Walter Cup champion	Regular season champion	Playoff MVP	Season MVP	Top scorer	Top goal scorer
2024	6	PWHL Minnesota (3–2 vs PWHL Boston)	PWHL Toronto (47 points)	Taylor Heise (PWHL Minnesota)	Natalie Spooner (PWHL Toronto)	Natalie Spooner (PWHL Toronto) (27 points)	Natalie Spooner (PWHL Toronto) (20 goals)
2024–25	6	Minnesota Frost (3–1 vs Ottawa Charge)	Montreal Victoire (53 points)	Gwyneth Philips (Ottawa Charge)	Marie-Philip Poulin (Montreal Victoire)	Hilary Knight (Boston Fleet) / Sarah Fillier (New York Sirens) (29 points)	Marie-Philip Poulin (Montreal Victoire) (19 goals)
2025–26	8	Montreal Victoire (3–1 vs Ottawa Charge)	Montreal Victoire (62 points)	Marie-Philip Poulin (Montreal Victoire)	Aerin Frankel (Boston Fleet)	Kelly Pannek (Minnesota Frost) (33 points)	Kelly Pannek (Minnesota Frost) (16 goals)

=== Titles by team ===
PWHL titles by team
Team	Seasons	Walter Cup champion	Seasons	Regular season champion	Seasons	Total
Minnesota Frost	3	2	2024, 2024–25	0	—	2
Montreal Victoire	3	1	2025–26	2	2024–25, 2025–26	3
Toronto Sceptres	3	0	—	1	2024	1

== Broadcasting ==
Production of all PWHL game telecasts are being handled in-house by the league, with Dome Productions (jointly owned by Bell Media and Rogers Sports & Media) handling host production for Canadian home games, and Raycom Sports handling production for U.S. home games.

=== Canada ===
In Canada, the league reached agreements for the inaugural season with the Canadian Broadcasting Corporation (via CBC Television and CBC Gem in English, and Ici Radio-Canada Télé and Ici TOU.TV in French), Sportsnet, TSN, and RDS (French) to carry packages of games throughout the season. Other games were streamed for free on YouTube, though this only happened for the first season. For the 2024–25 season, Sportsnet was replaced by Amazon Prime Video, which exclusively carries Tuesday night games, and holds rights to one semi-final series. The CBC primarily broadcasts Saturday afternoon games, while French-language coverage of Montreal Victoire games are split among the three broadcasters. In the 2025–26 season, Sportsnet returned, along with expanded playoff and French language rights for Prime Video. On September 28, 2026, the CBC announced that the Hockey Night in Canada branding, historically used for their coverage of NHL games, would be used for eight PWHL games for the 2026–27 season.

=== United States ===
Distribution of games in the United States would initially rely on partnerships with regional sports networks, with the PWHL partnering with NESN, Bally Sports North (later known as FanDuel Sports Network North), and MSG Network for Boston, Minnesota, and New York games respectively. In February 2024, the league announced a partnership with the free ad-supported streaming television (FAST) platform Women's Sports Network as its first national media partner in the United States. The Seattle Torrent partnered with KZJO and KONG. For the 2025 PWHL playoffs, the PWHL reached agreements with FanDuel Sports Network, Gray Media, Scripps Sports and the Sinclair Broadcast Group to expand its distribution of games. (Note: Games specifically aired on FanDuel Sports Network SoCal, FanDuel Sports Network Southwest, Gulf Coast Sports & Entertainment Network, Peachtree Sports Network, Palmetto Sports & Entertainment Network, Rock Entertainment Sports Network, Tennessee Valley Sports & Entertainment Network, Matrix Midwest, The Wax, KCRG-DT2, WHDT, WFTX-DT3, KUPX-TV, KCDO-TV, KMCC, KIVI-DT2, KSAW-DT2, and KUNS-TV.)

On March 12, 2026, the PWHL and Scripps Sports announced that a March 28 game between the New York Sirens and the Montreal Victoire would air on Scripps-owned Ion Television; the Takeover Tour game played in Detroit would be the first time a PWHL game would enjoy nationwide linear-television coverage in the United States. The league would later announce on March 18 that Ion would telecast the 2026 Walter Cup Finals. On September 9, 2026, the league and Scripps Sports would announce that for the 2026–27 season, Ion would broadcast a weekly Saturday night game, as well as a Walter Cup playoff series and the Finals. Also included in the agreement between the league and Scripps are two weekly games shown on the Scripps Sports Network FAST channel, as well as local broadcast partnerships between expansion teams in Detroit and Las Vegas and Scripps-owned stations in those cities (respectively, WMYD and KMCC).

== Statistical leaders ==
=== Most shutouts in regular season games (all-time) ===
As of 2025–26 season

Rank	Player	Games played	Shutouts
1	Aerin Frankel	67	10
2	Ann-Renée Desbiens	62	8
3	Kayle Osborne	37	5
3	Gwyneth Philips	43	5
3	Corine Shroeder	52	5
3	Maddie Rooney	50	5
7	Kristen Campbell	56	4
8	Emerance Maschmeyer	53	3
8	Raygan Kirk	27	3
8	Nicole Hensley	38	3
11	Sandra Abstreiter	8	1
11	Klara Peslarova	4	1

=== Most points regular season games (all-time) ===
As of 2025–26 season

Rank	Player	Games played	Goals	Assists	Points
1	Marie-Philip Poulin	70	38	29	67
2	Taylor Heise	78	25	40	65
3	Alex Carpenter	80	31	32	63
3	Daryl Watts	81	32	31	63
3	Kendall Coyne Schofield	77	30	33	63
6	Laura Stacey	80	28	34	62
7	Jessie Eldridge	84	30	31	61
7	Brianne Jenner	82	28	33	61
9	Kelly Pannek	84	23	37	60
