= List of 2023–24 PWHL Three Star Awards =

The 2023–24 PWHL Three Star Awards are the way the Professional Women's Hockey League denotes its players of the week for the 2023–24 season.

== Weekly ==
Week	First Star	Second Star	Third Star	Ref
January 1–7	Grace Zumwinkle (MIN)	Alex Carpenter (NYC)	Corinne Schroeder (NYC)	
January 8–14	Marie-Philip Poulin (MTL)	Ella Shelton (NYC)	Taylor Heise (MIN)	
January 15–21	Marie-Philip Poulin (MTL)	Jade Downie-Landry (NYC)	Alina Müller (BOS)	
January 22–28	Alina Müller (BOS)	Brianne Jenner (OTT)	Natalie Spooner (TOR)	
January 29 – February 4	Natalie Spooner (TOR)	Alex Carpenter (NYC)	Abby Roque (NYC)	
February 5–11	No games, IIHF National Team break			
February 12–18	Natalie Spooner (TOR)	Kristen Campbell (TOR)	Kendall Coyne Schofield (MIN)	
February 19–25	Claire Dalton (MTL)	Daryl Watts (OTT)	Aerin Frankel (BOS)	
February 26 – March 3	Sarah Nurse (TOR)	Sophie Jaques (MIN)	Renata Fast (TOR)	
March 4–10	Kateřina Mrázová (OTT)	Kristen Campbell (TOR)	Brianne Jenner (OTT)	
March 11–17	Kendall Coyne Schofield (MIN)	Michela Cava (MIN)	Kali Flanagan (TOR)	
March 18–25	Daryl Watts (OTT)	Brianne Jenner (OTT)	Natalie Spooner (TOR)	
March 26 – April 14	No games, IIHF National Team break			
April 15–21	Erin Ambrose (MTL)	Brianne Jenner (OTT)	Aerin Frankel (BOS)	
April 22–28	Sarah Nurse (TOR)	Ann-Renée Desbiens (MTL)	Hannah Brandt (BOS)	
April 29 – May 5	Ella Shelton (NYC)	Natalie Spooner (TOR)	Hilary Knight (BOS)	
May 6 – 12	Kristen Campbell (TOR)	Aerin Frankel (BOS)	Blayre Turnbull (TOR)	
May 13 – 19	Maddie Rooney (MIN)	Taylor Heise (MIN)	Susanna Tapani (BOS)	
May 20 – 29	Nicole Hensley (MIN)	Michela Cava (MIN)	Taylor Heise (MIN)	

=== SupraStars of the Month ===
On March 8, 2024, the PWHL announced the introduction of the SupraStars of the Month award to recognize three forwards, two defenders, and one goaltender at the conclusion of each month, determined as the players who most excelled on ice throughout the PWHL, and sponsored by AIRSUPRA.

Month	Position	Player	Team	Ref
February	F	Alex Carpenter	New York	
February	F	Emma Maltais	Toronto	
February	F	Natalie Spooner	Toronto	
February	D	Megan Keller	Boston	
February	D	Aneta Tejralová	Ottawa	
February	G	Kristen Campbell	Toronto	
March	F	Brianne Jenner	Ottawa	
March	F	Kateřina Mrázová	Ottawa	
March	F	Natalie Spooner	Toronto	
March	D	Natalie Buchbinder	Minnesota	
March	D	Sophie Jaques	Minnesota	
March	G	Kristen Campbell	Toronto	
April	F	Brianne Jenner	Ottawa	
April	F	Sarah Nurse	Toronto	
April	F	Laura Stacey	Montreal	
April	D	Erin Ambrose	Montreal	
April	D	Ella Shelton	New York	
April	G	Aerin Frankel	Boston	
May	F	Michela Cava	Minnesota	
May	F	Taylor Heise	Minnesota	
May	F	Alina Müller	Boston	
May	D	Sophie Jaques	Minnesota	
May	D	Megan Keller	Boston	
May	G	Aerin Frankel	Boston	
