= 2023–24 PWHL Minnesota season =

Professional Women's Hockey League season

2023–24 PWHL Minnesota
- Walter Cup champions
- 2023–24 record: 8–4–3–9 (4th)
- Home record: 5–2–2–3
- Road record: 3–2–1–6
- Goals for: 54
- Goals against: 54

Team information
- General manager: Natalie Darwitz
- Coach: Ken Klee
- Assistant coach: Jake Bobrowski; Mira Jalosuo
- Captain: Kendall Coyne Schofield
- Alternate captains: Kelly Pannek; Lee Stecklein
- Arena: Xcel Energy Center
- Average attendance: 7,138

Team leaders
- Goals: Grace Zumwinkle (11)
- Assists: Kelly Pannek (12)
- Points: Grace Zumwinkle (19)
- Penalty minutes: Lee Stecklein (16)
- Plus/minus: Kendall Coyne Schofield (+12)
- Wins: Nicole Hensley (7)
- Goals against average: Maddie Rooney (2.08)

The 2023–24 PWHL Minnesota season was the team's inaugural season as a member of the newly created Professional Women's Hockey League (PWHL). They played their home games at Xcel Energy Center in Saint Paul, Minnesota.

PWHL Minnesota clinched the league's final playoff spot on the last day of the regular season, and regular season-champion PWHL Toronto selected Minnesota as its semifinal opponent. Minnesota went on to defeat Toronto in a five-game series, winning three straight games after losing the first two. Minnesota advanced to the PWHL Finals, where they faced PWHL Boston. Minnesota prevailed in another five-game series, winning the inaugural Walter Cup championship. Minnesota's first overall draft pick from the 2023 PWHL draft, Taylor Heise, led the playoffs in scoring and was voted the most valuable player of the playoffs. After the season, Grace Zumwinkle was named the league's rookie of the year.

== Offseason ==
On September 1, 2023, Minnesota hired Natalie Darwitz as its general manager. Darwitz hired Charlie Burggraf as the team's first head coach on September 15. Jake Bobrowski and Mira Jalosuo were hired as assistant coaches on October 6. On September 25, The Hockey News reported that Minnesota would play their home games at Xcel Energy Center.

On September 6, Minnesota announced the signings of their first three players, American national team members Lee Stecklein, Kendall Coyne Schofield, and Kelly Pannek. Coyne Schofield was named team captain, with Stecklein and Pannek named assistant captains. Minnesota won the first overall selection in the inaugural PWHL draft on September 18; with the pick, the team selected Minnesota Golden Gophers forward Taylor Heise.

On December 27, 2023—one week before Minnesota's season-opening game—the team announced that Burggraf was stepping down as the team's head coach, and would be replaced by Ken Klee.

== Standings ==
Pos	Team	Pld	W	OTW	OTL	L	GF	GA	GD	Pts	Qualification
1	Toronto (Y)	24	13	4	0	7	69	50	+19	47	Playoffs
2	Montreal (X)	24	10	3	5	6	60	57	+3	41	Playoffs
3	Boston (X)	24	8	4	3	9	50	57	−7	35 (Note: Greater number of games won, excluding games won by Shootout: Boston 11 wins, Minnesota 10 wins)	Playoffs
4	Minnesota (X)	24	8	4	3	9	54	54	0	35	Playoffs
5	Ottawa (E)	24	8	1	6	9	62	63	−1	32	
6	New York (E)	24	5	4	3	12	53	67	−14	26	

Updated to match(es) played on May 5, 2024. Source: PWHL
(E) Eliminated; (X) Clinched playoff berth; (Y) Clinched first place

== Schedule and results ==
=== Regular season ===
Minnesota played its first ever game on January 3, 2024, in Lowell, Massachusetts, against PWHL Boston. Taylor Heise scored the franchise's first goal, and Minnesota went on to win the game by a score of 3–2. The team made its home debut on January 6. Grace Zumwinkle scored a hat-trick and Maddie Rooney posted a shutout in a 3–0 victory over PWHL Montreal. With 13,316 fans in attendance, the game set a new record for attendance at a professional women's hockey game. Despite a strong start to the season, including wins in seven of the team's first eleven games, Minnesota clinched a playoff spot on the last day of the season after losing five straight games to end the regular season.

=== Regular season schedule ===
The regular season schedule was published on November 30, 2023.

Regular season schedule (Home: 5–2–2–3; Road: 3–2–1–6)
January: 3–2–2–1, 15 points (Home: 2–0–1–1; Road: 1–2–1–0)

Game	Date	Opponent	Score	OT	Decision	Location	Attendance	Record	Points	Recap
1	January 3	@ PWHL Boston	3–2		Hensley	Tsongas Center	4,012	1–0–0–0	3	
2	January 6	PWHL Montreal	3–0		Rooney	Xcel Energy Center	13,316	2–0–0–0	6	
3	January 10	PWHL Toronto	3–1		Hensley	Xcel Energy Center	4,707	3–0–0–0	9	
4	January 14	PWHL New York	2–3	OT	Rooney	Xcel Energy Center	7,951	3–0–1–0	10	
5	January 17	@ PWHL Ottawa	3–2	OT	Hensley	TD Place Arena	5,609	3–1–1–0	12	
6	January 24	PWHL Montreal	1–2		Hensley	Xcel Energy Center	5,001	3–1–1–1	12	
7	January 27	@ PWHL Boston	3–4	OT	Rooney	Tsongas Center	4,059	3–1–2–1	13	
8	January 28	@ PWHL New York	2–1	OT	Hensley	Total Mortgage Arena	2,393	3–2–2–1	15	

February 2–0–1–3, 7 points (Home: 1–0–1–1; Road: 1–0–0–2)

Game	Date	Opponent	Score	OT	Decision	Location	Attendance	Record	Points	Recap
9	February 3	@ PWHL Toronto	1–4		Hensley	Mattamy Athletic Centre	2,470	3–2–2–2	15	
10	February 14	PWHL Ottawa	2–1		Rooney	Xcel Energy Center	6,276	4–2–2–2	18	
11	February 17	@ PWHL Ottawa	2–1		Hensley	TD Place Arena	8,407	5–2–2–2	21	
12	February 18	@ PWHL Montreal	1–2		Rooney	Place Bell	10,172	5–2–2–3	21	
13	February 25	PWHL Boston	0–2		Hensley	Xcel Energy Center	10,186	5–2–2–4	21	
14	February 27	PWHL Toronto	3–4	OT	Hensley	3M Arena at Mariucci	2,718	5–2–3–4	22	

March 3–2–0–0, 13 points (Home: 2–2–0–0; Road: 1–0–0–0)

Game	Date	Opponent	Score	OT	Decision	Location	Attendance	Record	Points	Recap
15	March 3	@ PWHL New York	2–0		Rooney	UBS Arena	4,459	6–2–3–4	25	
16	March 5	PWHL Ottawa	4–3	SO	Rooney	Xcel Energy Center	4,585	6–3–3–4	27	
17	March 13	PWHL Boston	4–0		Hensley	Xcel Energy Center	4,669	7–3–3–4	30	
18	March 16	PWHL New York	5–1		Rooney	Xcel Energy Center	9,006	8–3–3–4	33	
19	March 24	PWHL Montreal	3–2	SO	Hensley	Xcel Energy Center	7,268	8–4–3–4	35	

April 0–0–0–3, 0 points (Home: 0–0–0–1; Road: 0–0–0–2)

Game	Date	Opponent	Score	OT	Decision	Location	Attendance	Record	Points	Recap
20	April 18	@ PWHL Montreal	3–4		Rooney	Verdun Auditorium	3,084	8–4–3–5	35	
21	April 20	@ PWHL Ottawa	0–4		Hensley	TD Place Arena	8,110	8–4–3–6	35	
22	April 27	PWHL Boston	1–2		Hensley	Xcel Energy Center	9,977	8–4–3–7	35	

May 0–0–0–2, 0 points (Home: 0–0–0–0; Road: 0–0–0–2)

Game	Date	Opponent	Score	OT	Decision	Location	Attendance	Record	Points	Recap
23	May 1	@ PWHL Toronto	1–4		Rooney	Mattamy Athletic Centre	2,571	8–4–3–8	35	
24	May 4	@ PWHL New York	2–5		Hensley	UBS Arena	1,563	8–4–3–9	35	

Regulation Win (3 points) Overtime/Shootout win (2 points) Overtime/shootout loss (1 point) Regulation Loss (0 points)

=== Playoffs ===
On May 6, 2024, PWHL Toronto elected to play Minnesota in the first round of the playoffs. Minnesota lost the first two games in the series, failing to score a goal in either; however, Minnesota then won three straight games to clinch the series and advance to the finals, where they faced PWHL Boston. In the finals, Minnesota won the fifth and deciding game of the series on the road with a 3–0 decision to capture the Walter Cup championship.

2024 PWHL Playoffs
First round vs. PWHL Toronto: Minnesota won 3–2

Game	Date	Opponent	Score	OT	Decision	Location	Attendance	Series	Recap
1	May 8	@ Toronto	0–4		Hensley	Coca-Cola Coliseum	8,473	0–1	
2	May 10	@ Toronto	0–2		Rooney	Coca-Cola Coliseum	8,581	0–2	
3	May 13	Toronto	2–0		Rooney	Xcel Energy Center	3,344	1–2	
4	May 15	Toronto	1–0	2OT	Rooney	Xcel Energy Center	2,766	2–2	
5	May 17	@ Toronto	4–1		Rooney	Coca-Cola Coliseum	8,501	3–2	

Walter Cup Finals vs. PWHL Boston: Minnesota won 3–2

Game	Date	Opponent	Score	OT	Decision	Location	Attendance	Series	Recap
1	May 19	@ Boston	3–4		Rooney	Tsongas Center	4,508	0–1	
2	May 21	@ Boston	3–0		Hensley	Tsongas Center	4,543	1–1	
3	May 24	Boston	4–1		Hensley	Xcel Energy Center	9,054	2–1	
4	May 26	Boston	0–1	2OT	Hensley	Xcel Energy Center	13,104	2–2	
5	May 29	@ Boston	3–0		Hensley	Tsongas Center	6,309	3–2	

== Player statistics ==
= Indicates team leader

As of May 29, 2024

=== Skaters ===
Regular season
Player	GP	G	A	Pts	SOG	+/−	PIM
Grace Zumwinkle	24	11	8	19	98	+6	4
Kendall Coyne Schofield	24	6	10	16	79	+12	6
Kelly Pannek	24	4	12	16	50	+11	2
Taylor Heise	19	4	9	13	52	+5	8
Sophie Jaques	15	2	8	10	59	+3	4
Michela Cava	24	5	3	8	43	+3	4
Lee Stecklein	24	2	6	8	35	0	16
Denisa Křížová	24	3	3	6	50	0	8
Natalie Buchbinder	24	2	4	6	28	+6	0
Maggie Flaherty	24	1	5	6	33	+4	14
Abby Boreen	9	4	1	5	27	+2	4
Sophia Kunin	24	2	1	3	32	–1	6
Claire Butorac	21	1	2	3	12	–1	2
Liz Schepers	19	0	3	3	28	0	8
Brittyn Fleming	23	1	1	2	26	+4	8
Mellissa Channell	24	0	2	2	11	+1	0
Brooke Bryant	22	1	0	1	9	+1	6
Sydney Brodt	7	0	1	1	1	–3	2
Clair DeGeorge	23	0	1	1	14	–4	6
Dominique Kremer	12	0	0	0	1	–1	0
Emma Greco	22	0	0	0	24	+8	10

Playoffs
Player	GP	G	A	Pts	SOG	+/−	PIM
Taylor Heise	10	5	3	8	29	+6	2
Michela Cava	10	4	4	8	25	+6	4
Sophie Jaques	10	2	3	5	28	+6	2
Liz Schepers	10	1	4	5	15	+2	2
Mellissa Channell	10	0	5	5	12	+6	2
Kendall Coyne Schofield	10	1	3	4	26	+6	0
Claire Butorac	10	1	2	3	9	–1	2
Lee Stecklein	10	0	3	3	10	–1	2
Denisa Křížová	10	2	0	2	18	0	6
Sydney Brodt	10	1	1	2	7	+1	0
Kelly Pannek	10	0	2	2	20	–4	0
Maggie Flaherty	10	1	0	1	9	–1	2
Sophia Kunin	10	1	0	1	14	+1	2
Grace Zumwinkle	10	1	0	1	26	–4	0
Abby Boreen	5	0	1	1	8	–2	2
Brittyn Fleming	9	0	1	1	6	+2	2
Natalie Buchbinder	10	0	1	1	16	–1	2
Brooke Bryant	6	0	0	0	1	0	0
Clair DeGeorge	10	0	0	0	6	+1	4
Emma Greco	10	0	0	0	6	0	6

=== Goaltenders ===
Regular season
Player	GP	TOI	W	L	OT	GA	GAA	SA	SV%	SO	G	A	PIM
Nicole Hensley	14	849:22	7	6	1	31	2.19	383	0.919	1	0	1	2
Maddie Rooney	10	605:34	5	3	2	21	2.08	246	0.915	2	0	0	0

Playoffs
Player	GP	TOI	W	L	OT	GA	GAA	SA	SV%	SO	G	A	PIM
Nicole Hensley	5	338:29	3	1	1	6	1.06	109	0.945	2	0	0	0
Maddie Rooney	5	322:12	3	2	0	6	1.12	116	0.948	2	0	0	0

== 2023–24 Roster ==
=== Active players ===
As of March 20, 2024

No.	Nat	Player	Pos	S/G	Age	Acquired	Birthplace
10	(United States)	Sydney Brodt	F	R	26	2023	North Oaks, Minnesota
17	(United States)	Brooke Bryant	F	R	23	2023	Linden, California
22	(United States)	Natalie Buchbinder	D	R	25	2023	Fairport, New York
7	(United States)	Claire Butorac	F	R	24	2023	Andover, Minnesota
86	(Canada)	Michela Cava	F	R	30	2023	Thunder Bay, Ontario
23	(Canada)	Mellissa Channell	D	L	29	2023	Oakville, Ontario
26	(United States)	Kendall Coyne Schofield (C)	F	L	32	2023	Palos Heights, Illinois
14	(United States)	Clair DeGeorge	F	L	24	2023	Anchorage, Alaska
19	(United States)	Maggie Flaherty	D	L	23	2023	Lakeville, Minnesota
18	(United States)	Brittyn Fleming	F	L	25	2023	Oregon, Wisconsin
25	(Canada)	Emma Greco	D	L	29	2023	Burlington, Ontario
27	(United States)	Taylor Heise	F	R	24	2023	Lake City, Minnesota
29	(United States)	Nicole Hensley	G	L	29	2023	Littleton, Colorado
16	(Canada)	Sophie Jaques	D	R	23	2024	Toronto, Ontario
36	(United States)	Dominique Kremer	F	R	26	2023	Fargo, North Dakota
41	(Czech Republic)	Denisa Křížová	F	L	29	2023	Horni Cerekev, Czechia
11	(United States)	Sophia Kunin	F	R	27	2023	Wayzata, Minnesota
28	(Canada)	Amanda Leveille	G	L	29	2023	Kingston, Ontario
12	(United States)	Kelly Pannek (A)	F	R	28	2023	Plymouth, Minnesota
35	(United States)	Maddie Rooney	G	L	26	2023	Andover, Minnesota
21	(United States)	Liz Schepers	F	L	25	2023	Mound, Minnesota
2	(United States)	Lee Stecklein (A)	D	L	30	2023	Roseville, Minnesota
13	(United States)	Grace Zumwinkle	F	R	25	2023	Excelsior, Minnesota

=== Reserves ===
As of March 20, 2024

No.	Nat	Player	Pos	S/G	Age	Acquired	Birthplace
33	(United States)	Lauren Bench	G	L	26	2024	Eagan, Minnesota
5	(United States)	Nikki Nightengale	D	R	26	2023	Bloomington, Minnesota
24	(United States)	Abigail Boreen	F	R	24	2024	Somerset, Wisconsin

== Awards and honors ==
=== Milestones ===
Regular season
Date	Player	Milestone
January 3, 2024	Taylor Heise	1st goal in franchise history
January 3, 2024	Taylor Heise	1st career PWHL goal
January 3, 2024	Taylor Heise	1st career PWHL game
January 3, 2024	Sophia Kunin	1st career PWHL goal
January 3, 2024	Sophia Kunin	1st career PWHL game
January 3, 2024	Grace Zumwinkle	1st career PWHL goal
January 3, 2024	Grace Zumwinkle	1st career PWHL game
January 3, 2024	Mellissa Channell	1st career PWHL assist
January 3, 2024	Mellissa Channell	1st career PWHL game
January 3, 2024	Brittyn Fleming	1st assist in franchise history
January 3, 2024	Brittyn Fleming	1st career PWHL assist
January 3, 2024	Brittyn Fleming	1st career PWHL game
January 3, 2024	Nicole Hensley	1st win in franchise history
January 3, 2024	Nicole Hensley	1st career PWHL win
January 3, 2024	Nicole Hensley	1st career PWHL game
January 3, 2024	Brooke Bryant	1st career PWHL game
January 3, 2024	Natalie Buchbinder	1st career PWHL game
January 3, 2024	Michela Cava	1st career PWHL game
January 3, 2024	Abby Cook	1st career PWHL game
January 3, 2024	Kendall Coyne Schofield	1st career PWHL game
January 3, 2024	Clair DeGeorge	1st career PWHL game
January 3, 2024	Maggie Flaherty	1st career PWHL game
January 3, 2024	Emma Greco	1st career PWHL game
January 3, 2024	Dominique Kremer	1st career PWHL game
January 3, 2024	Denisa Křížová	1st career PWHL game
January 3, 2024	Kelly Pannek	1st career PWHL game
January 3, 2024	Liz Schepers	1st career PWHL game
January 3, 2024	Lee Stecklein	1st career PWHL game
January 3, 2024	Susanna Tapani	1st career PWHL game
January 6, 2024	Grace Zumwinkle	1st career PWHL hat-trick
January 6, 2024	Maddie Rooney	1st career PWHL shutout
January 6, 2024	Maddie Rooney	1st career PWHL win
January 6, 2024	Maddie Rooney	1st career PWHL game
January 6, 2024	Claire Butorac	1st career PWHL game
January 10, 2024	Lee Stecklein	1st career PWHL assist
January 10, 2024	Denisa Křížová	1st career PWHL assist
January 10, 2024	Taylor Heise	1st career PWHL assist
January 14, 2024	Lee Stecklein	1st career PWHL goal
January 14, 2024	Kelly Pannek	1st career PWHL goal
January 14, 2024	Michela Cava	1st career PWHL assist
January 14, 2024	Grace Zumwinkle	1st career penalty shot
January 14, 2024	Maddie Rooney	1st career PWHL loss
January 17, 2024	Susanna Tapani	1st career PWHL goal
January 17, 2024	Susanna Tapani	1st career PWHL power-play goal
January 17, 2024	Grace Zumwinkle	5th career PWHL goal
January 17, 2024	Grace Zumwinkle	1st career PWHL short-handed goal
January 17, 2024	Grace Zumwinkle	1st career PWHL assist
January 24, 2024	Michela Cava	1st career PWHL goal
January 24, 2024	Sophia Kunin	1st career PWHL assist
January 24, 2024	Abby Boreen	1st career PWHL game
January 27, 2024	Brittyn Fleming	1st career PWHL goal
January 27, 2024	Claire Butorac	1st career PWHL assist
January 27, 2024	Lee Stecklein	5th career PWHL assist
January 28, 2024	Abby Cook	1st career PWHL goal
January 28, 2024	Kendall Coyne Schofield	1st career PWHL assist
January 28, 2024	Abby Boreen	1st career PWHL goal
January 28, 2024	Abby Boreen	1st career PWHL overtime goal
January 28, 2024	Nicole Hensley	1st career PWHL assist
February 3, 2024	Natalie Buchbinder	1st career PWHL assist
February 14, 2024	Abby Boreen	1st career PWHL power-play goal
February 14, 2024	Abby Boreen	1st career PWHL assist
February 14, 2024	Sophie Jaques	1st career PWHL assist
February 14, 2024	Maggie Flaherty	1st career PWHL goal
February 17, 2024	Maggie Flaherty	1st career PWHL assist
February 27, 2024	Sophie Jaques	1st career PWHL goal
February 27, 2024	Natalie Buchbinder	1st career PWHL goal
March 5, 2024	Denisa Křižová	1st career PWHL goal
March 5, 2024	Kendall Coyne Schofield	5th career PWHL assist
March 5, 2024	Grace Zumwinkle	5th career PWHL assist
March 13, 2024	Kendall Coyne Schofield	5th career PWHL goal
March 13, 2024	Kelly Pannek	10th career PWHL assist
March 13, 2024	Taylor Heise	5th career PWHL assist
March 13, 2024	Nicole Hensley	1st career PWHL shutout
March 16, 2024	Claire Butorac	1st career PWHL goal
March 16, 2024	Sydney Brodt	1st career PWHL assist
March 16, 2024	Sydney Brodt	1st career PWHL game
March 24, 2024	Clair DeGeorge	1st career PWHL assist
March 24, 2024	Sophie Jaques	5th career PWHL assist
April 18, 2024	Grace Zumwinkle	10th career PWHL goal
April 18, 2024	Brooke Bryant	1st career PWHL goal
April 27, 2024	Kendall Coyne Schofield	10th career PWHL assist
May 1, 2024	Michela Cava	5th career PWHL goal
May 1, 2024	Maggie Flaherty	5th career PWHL assist

=== Honors ===
- January 1–7: Grace Zumwinkle named PWHL First Star of the Week
- January 8–14: Taylor Heise named PWHL Third Star of the Week
- February 12–18: Kendall Coyne Schofield named PWHL Third Star of the Week
- February 26 – March 3: Sophie Jaques named PWHL Second Star of the Week
- March 11–17: Kendall Coyne Schofield and Michela Cava named PWHL First and Second Stars of the Week

=== Awards ===
Award winners
Award	Recipient(s)	Ref
Ilana Kloss Playoff MVP Award Most valuable player, playoffs	Taylor Heise	
Rookie of the Year	Grace Zumwinkle	

== Transactions ==
Minnesota has been involved in the following transactions during the 2023–24 PWHL season.

=== Signings ===
Date	Player	Position	Term	Previous team	Ref
September 6, 2023	Kelly Pannek	F	3 years	Team Scotiabank	
September 6, 2023	Kendall Coyne Schofield	F	3 years	Team Adidas	
September 6, 2023	Lee Stecklein	D	3 years	Team Harvey's	
October 26, 2023	Taylor Heise	F	3 years	Minnesota	
October 31, 2023	Nicole Hensley	G	3 years	Team Sonnet	
November 1, 2023	Grace Zumwinkle	F	3 years	Minnesota	
November 8, 2023	Susanna Tapani	F	2 years	KRS Vanke Rays	
November 20, 2023	Maggie Flaherty	D	2 years	Minnesota Duluth	
November 27, 2023	Natalie Buchbinder	D	2 years	Wisconsin	
November 29, 2023	Brooke Bryant	F	1 year	Minnesota State	
November 29, 2023	Sydney Brodt	F	1 year	Minnesota Whitecaps	
November 30, 2023	Liz Schepers	F	1 year	Minnesota Whitecaps	
November 30, 2023	Claire Butorac	F	1 year	Minnesota State	
December 1, 2023	Sophia Kunin	F	1 year	Team Harvey's	
December 1, 2023	Brittyn Fleming	F	1 year	Minnesota Whitecaps	
December 1, 2023	Denisa Křížová	F	2 years	Minnesota Whitecaps	
December 7, 2023	Clair DeGeorge	F	1 year	Team Harvey's	
December 7, 2023	Michela Cava	F	1 year	Toronto Six	
December 19, 2023	Amanda Leveille	G	1 year	Minnesota Whitecaps	
December 19, 2023	Maddie Rooney	G	2 years	Team Adidas	
December 20, 2023	Dominique Kremer	D	1 year	Buffalo Beauts	
December 20, 2023	Abby Cook	D	1 year	HC Ladies Lugano	
December 21, 2023	Emma Greco	D	1 year	Toronto Six	
December 21, 2023	Mellissa Channell	D	1 year	Team Harvey's	

=== Trades ===
Date	Details		Ref
February 11, 2024	To Boston Susanna Tapani; Abby Cook	To Minnesota Sophie Jaques	

== Draft picks ==
Below are the PWHL Minnesota's selections at the 2023 PWHL draft held on September 18, 2023. PWHL Minnesota was awarded the first overall selection through a draft lottery.

Rd	Pick	Player	Nationality	Position	Previous team
1	1	Taylor Heise	United States	Forward	Minnesota (WCHA)
2	12	Nicole Hensley	United States	Goaltender	Team Sonnet (PWHPA)
3	13	Grace Zumwinkle	United States	Forward	Minnesota (WCHA)
4	24	Maggie Flaherty	United States	Defence	Minnesota Duluth (WCHA)
5	25	Susanna Tapani	Finland	Forward	KRS Vanke Rays (ZhHL; 2021–22)
6	36	Clair DeGeorge	United States	Forward	Team Harvey's (PWHPA)
7	37	Natalie Buchbinder	United States	Defence	Wisconsin (WCHA)
8	48	Denisa Krizova	Czech Republic	Forward	Minnesota Whitecaps (PHF)
9	49	Sidney Morin	United States	Defence	Minnesota Whitecaps (PHF)
10	60	Sophia Kunin	United States	Forward	Team Harvey's (PWHPA)
11	61	Amanda Leveille	Canada	Goaltender	Minnesota Whitecaps (PHF)
12	72	Michela Cava	Canada	Forward	Toronto Six (PHF)
13	73	Liz Schepers	United States	Forward	Minnesota Whitecaps (PHF)
14	84	Minttu Tuominen	Finland	Defence	Kiekko-Espoo (NSML)
15	85	Sydney Brodt	United States	Forward	Minnesota Whitecaps (PHF)
