= 2023–24 PWHL Boston season =

Professional Women's Hockey League season

2023–24 PWHL Boston
- 2023–24 record: 8–4–3–9 (3rd)
- Home record: 3–3–2–4
- Road record: 5–1–1–5
- Goals for: 50
- Goals against: 57

Team information
- General manager: Danielle Marmer
- Coach: Courtney Kessel
- Assistant coach: Stefanie McKeough; Pernilla Winberg
- Captain: Hilary Knight
- Alternate captains: Megan Keller; Jamie Lee Rattray
- Arena: Tsongas Center
- Average attendance: 3,770

Team leaders
- Goals: Hilary Knight (6)
- Assists: Alina Müller; Megan Keller (11)
- Points: Alina Müller (16)
- Penalty minutes: Kaleigh Fratkin (26)
- Plus/minus: Megan Keller (+9)
- Wins: Aerin Frankel (8)
- Goals against average: Aerin Frankel (2.00)

The 2023–24 PWHL Boston season was the team's inaugural season as a member of the newly created Professional Women's Hockey League (PWHL). They played their home games at the Tsongas Center in Lowell, Massachusetts.

PWHL Boston finished third overall in the league standings and drew a match-up against PWHL Montreal in the playoff semifinals. Boston defeated Montreal in three straight games—with all three games decided in overtime—to advance to the finals, where they faced PWHL Minnesota for the Walter Cup championship. Minnesota won the series in five games, leaving Boston as the runners up.

== Offseason ==
On September 1, 2023, Boston hired Danielle Marmer as its general manager. The team hired Courtney Kessel as its first head coach on September 15. In November, it was announced that the team would play its home games at the Tsongas Center in Lowell.

On September 7, Boston announced the signings of its first three players, American national team members Hilary Knight, Aerin Frankel, and Megan Keller. Knight was named team captain, with Keller and Jamie Lee Rattray named assistant captains.

== Standings ==
Pos	Team	Pld	W	OTW	OTL	L	GF	GA	GD	Pts	Qualification
1	Toronto (Y)	24	13	4	0	7	69	50	+19	47	Playoffs
2	Montreal (X)	24	10	3	5	6	60	57	+3	41	Playoffs
3	Boston (X)	24	8	4	3	9	50	57	−7	35 (Note: Greater number of games won, excluding games won by Shootout: Boston 11 wins, Minnesota 10 wins)	Playoffs
4	Minnesota (X)	24	8	4	3	9	54	54	0	35	Playoffs
5	Ottawa (E)	24	8	1	6	9	62	63	−1	32	
6	New York (E)	24	5	4	3	12	53	67	−14	26	

Updated to match(es) played on May 5, 2024. Source: PWHL
(E) Eliminated; (X) Clinched playoff berth; (Y) Clinched first place

== Schedule and results ==
=== Regular season ===
Boston hosted its inaugural game on January 3, 2024, against PWHL Minnesota. Theresa Schafzahl scored the team's first goal in the second period; however, Minnesota went on to win the game by a score of 3–2. Boston secured its first win in its second game, defeating PWHL Montreal in overtime by a score of 3–2 on a goal by Amanda Pelkey. Boston sat outside of the playoff picture for much of the season; however, the team won four of its final five games, clinching a playoff spot in its final regular season game, a 4–3 win over Montreal.

=== Regular season schedule ===
The regular season schedule was published on November 30, 2023.

Regular season schedule (Home: 3–3–2–4; Road: 5–1–1–5)
January: 2–2–0–2, 10 points (Home: 0–1–0–2; Road: 2–1–0–0)

Game	Date	Opponent	Score	OT	Decision	Location	Attendance	Record	Points	Recap
1	January 3	PWHL Minnesota	2–3		Frankel	Tsongas Center	4,012	0–0–0–1	0	
–	January 8	PWHL Ottawa	Postponed due to inclement weather. Moved to February 19.							
2	January 13	@ PWHL Montreal	3–2	OT	Frankel	Verdun Auditorium	3,245	0–1–0–1	2	
3	January 17	@ PWHL Toronto	3–2		Söderberg	Mattamy Athletic Centre	2,491	1–1–0–1	5	
4	January 20	PWHL New York	1–4		Söderberg	Tsongas Center	4,007	1–1–0–2	5	
5	January 24	@ PWHL Ottawa	3–2		Frankel	TD Place Arena	5,208	2–1–0–2	8	
6	January 27	PWHL Minnesota	4–3	OT	Söderberg	Tsongas Center	4,059	2–2–0–2	10	

February: 2–0–2–2, 7 points (Home: 1–0–2–2; Road: 1–0–0–0)

Game	Date	Opponent	Score	OT	Decision	Location	Attendance	Record	Points	Recap
7	February 4	PWHL Montreal	1–2	OT	Frankel	Tsongas Center	4,210	2–2–1–2	11	
8	February 14	PWHL Toronto	3–5		Söderberg	Tsongas Center	1,791	2–2–1–3	11	
9	February 17	PWHL New York	1–2	OT	Frankel	Tsongas Center	4,002	2–2–2–3	12	
10	February 19	PWHL Ottawa	2–4		Frankel	Tsongas Center	2,849	2–2–2–4	12	
11	February 21	PWHL Ottawa	3–1		Frankel	Tsongas Center	1,889	3–2–2–4	15	
12	February 25	@ PWHL Minnesota	2–0		Frankel	Xcel Energy Center	10,186	4–2–2–4	18	

March: 0–2–0–5, 4 points (Home: 0–2–0–0; Road: 0–0–0–5)

Game	Date	Opponent	Score	OT	Decision	Location	Attendance	Record	Points	Recap
13	March 2	@ PWHL Montreal	1–3		Frankel	Verdun Auditorium	3,232	4–2–2–5	18	
14	March 6	@ PWHL Toronto	1–3		Frankel	Mattamy Athletic Centre	2,479	4–2–2–6	18	
15	March 10	PWHL New York	3–2	OT	Söderberg	Tsongas Center	4,607	4–3–2–6	20	
16	March 13	@ PWHL Minnesota	0–4		Frankel	Xcel Energy Center	4,669	4–3–2–7	20	
17	March 16	PWHL Ottawa	2–1	SO	Frankel	Little Caesars Arena	13,736	4–4–2–7	22	
18	March 20	@ PWHL Toronto	1–2		Söderberg	Mattamy Athletic Centre	2,525	4–4–2–8	22	
19	March 25	@ PWHL New York	2–3		Frankel	UBS Arena	2,834	4–4–2–9	22	

April: 3–0–1–0, 10 points (Home: 1–0–0–0; Road: 2–0–1–0)

Game	Date	Opponent	Score	OT	Decision	Location	Attendance	Record	Points	Recap
20	April 18	PWHL Toronto	2–1		Frankel	Tsongas Center	4,084	5–4–2–9	25	
21	April 20	@ PWHL New York	2–1		Frankel	Prudential Center	5,132	6–4–2–9	28	
22	April 24	@ PWHL Ottawa	2–3	SO	Frankel	TD Place Arena	7,686	6–4–3–9	29	
23	April 27	@ PWHL Minnesota	2–1		Söderberg	Xcel Energy Center	9,977	7–4–3–9	32	

May: 1–0–0–0, 3 points (Home: 1–0–0–0; Road: 0–0–0–0)

Game	Date	Opponent	Score	OT	Decision	Location	Attendance	Record	Points	Recap
24	May 4	PWHL Montreal	4–3		Frankel	Tsongas Center	5,964	8–4–3–9	35	

Regulation Win (3 points) Overtime/Shootout win (2 points) Overtime/shootout loss (1 point) Regulation Loss (0 points)

=== Playoffs ===
On May 6, 2024, PWHL Toronto announced that it had elected to play PWHL Minnesota in the first round of the playoffs, leaving PWHL Montreal and PWHL Boston matched up for the second semifinal.

Boston went on to win their semifinal series with three straight wins over Montreal, with all three victories coming in overtime, including a triple-overtime win in Game 2. This sent Boston to the final, where they faced Minnesota. Boston won the first game, on home ice, to take an early series lead. However, they lost the next two, before forcing a fifth and deciding game with a double-overtime win in the fourth game. Boston lost the deciding game by a score of 3–0 as Minnesota captured the inaugural Walter Cup championship.

2024 PWHL Playoffs
First round vs. PWHL Montreal: Boston won 3–0

Game	Date	Opponent	Score	OT	Decision	Location	Attendance	Series	Recap
1	May 9	@ Montreal	2–1	OT	Frankel	Place Bell	9,135	1–0	
2	May 11	@ Montreal	2–1	3OT	Frankel	Place Bell	10,172	2–0	
3	May 14	Montreal	3–2	OT	Frankel	Tsongas Center	2,781	3–0	

Walter Cup Finals vs. PWHL Minnesota: Minnesota won 3–2

Game	Date	Opponent	Score	OT	Decision	Location	Attendance	Series	Recap
1	May 19	Minnesota	4–3		Frankel	Tsongas Center	4,508	1–0	
2	May 21	Minnesota	0–3		Frankel	Tsongas Center	4,543	1–1	
3	May 24	@ Minnesota	1–4		Frankel	Xcel Energy Center	9,054	1–2	
4	May 26	@ Minnesota	1–0	2OT	Frankel	Xcel Energy Center	13,104	2–2	
5	May 29	Minnesota	0–3		Frankel	Tsongas Center	6,309	2–3	

== Player statistics ==
= Indicates team leader

As of May 29, 2024

=== Skaters ===
Regular season
Player	GP	G	A	Pts	SOG	+/−	PIM
Alina Müller	24	5	11	16	56	+7	6
Megan Keller	24	4	11	15	53	+9	12
Hilary Knight	24	6	5	11	84	+8	6
Jamie Lee Rattray	24	3	8	11	65	0	8
Hannah Brandt	24	5	5	10	39	–4	4
Susanna Tapani	17	2	6	8	38	+8	6
Loren Gabel	17	4	3	7	46	–1	2
Taylor Girard	23	4	2	6	30	–7	4
Theresa Schafzahl	20	3	3	6	23	+5	0
Sophie Shirley	20	3	2	5	25	–4	6
Emily Brown	24	1	3	4	20	+3	12
Gigi Marvin	24	1	3	4	21	–3	6
Sidney Morin	24	1	3	4	69	–2	2
Kaleigh Fratkin	24	2	1	3	11	+5	26
Lexie Adzija	7	1	2	3	7	+2	2
Nicole Kosta	10	1	2	3	5	+1	2
Jess Healey	22	1	2	3	14	+3	8
Jessica Digirolamo	24	0	3	3	25	–7	8
Amanda Pelkey	23	1	1	2	20	–5	8
Abby Cook	9	1	0	1	6	0	2
Kelly Babstock	4	0	1	1	1	0	2
Taylor Wenczkowski	16	0	0	0	2	+1	2

Playoffs
Player	GP	G	A	Pts	SOG	+/−	PIM
Susanna Tapani	8	3	1	4	13	0	2
Megan Keller	8	0	4	4	12	+2	10
Alina Müller	8	2	1	3	19	+1	0
Amanda Pelkey	8	2	1	3	9	0	0
Gigi Marvin	8	0	3	3	8	0	0
Theresa Schafzahl	8	0	3	3	7	+2	0
Taylor Wenczkowski	8	2	0	2	4	+1	2
Hannah Brandt	8	1	1	2	10	–1	4
Sophie Shirley	8	1	1	2	14	0	0
Emily Brown	8	0	2	2	6	–2	0
Sidney Morin	8	0	2	2	20	+5	0
Lexie Adzija	8	1	0	1	10	–2	7
Jess Healey	8	1	0	1	3	0	0
Jamie Lee Rattray	6	0	1	1	11	0	4
Abby Cook	2	0	0	0	0	0	0
Nicole Kosta	2	0	0	0	1	0	0
Loren Gabel	6	0	0	0	4	–2	0
Kelly Babstock	8	0	0	0	7	–1	4
Jessica Digirolamo	8	0	0	0	11	–2	2
Kaleigh Fratkin	8	0	0	0	13	–3	8
Hilary Knight	8	0	0	0	31	–6	2

=== Goaltenders ===
Regular season
Player	GP	TOI	W	L	OT	GA	GAA	SA	SV%	SO	G	A	PIM
Aerin Frankel	18	1050:52	8	6	2	35	2.00	490	0.929	1	0	0	0
Emma Söderberg	8	401:24	4	3	0	17	2.54	170	0.900	0	0	0	0

Playoffs
Player	GP	TOI	W	L	OT	GA	GAA	SA	SV%	SO	G	A	PIM
Aerin Frankel	8	580:58	5	3	0	14	1.45	300	0.953	1	0	0	0

== Awards and honors ==
=== Milestones ===
Regular season
Player	Milestone	Reached
Theresa Schafzahl	1st career PWHL goal	January 3, 2024
Theresa Schafzahl	1st career PWHL game	January 3, 2024
Megan Keller	1st career PWHL goal	January 3, 2024
Megan Keller	1st career PWHL game	January 3, 2024
Jamie Lee Rattray	1st career PWHL assist	January 3, 2024
Jamie Lee Rattray	1st career PWHL game	January 3, 2024
Sophie Shirley	1st career PWHL assist	January 3, 2024
Sophie Shirley	1st career PWHL game	January 3, 2024
Alina Müller	1st career PWHL assist	January 3, 2024
Alina Müller	1st career PWHL game	January 3, 2024
Sidney Morin	1st career PWHL assist	January 3, 2024
Sidney Morin	1st career PWHL game	January 3, 2024
Emily Brown	1st career PWHL game	January 3, 2024
Taylor Wenczkowski	1st career PWHL game	January 3, 2024
Kaleigh Fratkin	1st career PWHL game	January 3, 2024
Amanda Pelkey	1st career PWHL game	January 3, 2024
Taylor Girard	1st career PWHL game	January 3, 2024
Sophie Jaques	1st career PWHL game	January 3, 2024
Gigi Marvin	1st career PWHL game	January 3, 2024
Hannah Brandt	1st career PWHL game	January 3, 2024
Hilary Knight	1st career PWHL game	January 3, 2024
Jessica DiGirolamo	1st career PWHL game	January 3, 2024
Shiann Darkangelo	1st career PWHL game	January 3, 2024
Loren Gabel	1st career PWHL game	January 3, 2024
Jess Healey	1st career PWHL game	January 3, 2024
Aerin Frankel	1st career PWHL game	January 3, 2024
Aerin Frankel	1st career PWHL loss	January 3, 2024
Taylor Girard	1st career PWHL goal	January 13, 2024
Hannah Brandt	1st career PWHL goal	January 13, 2024
Amanda Pelkey	1st career PWHL goal	January 13, 2024
Amanda Pelkey	1st career PWHL overtime goal	January 13, 2024
Gigi Marvin	1st career PWHL assist	January 13, 2024
Theresa Schafzahl	1st career PWHL assist	January 13, 2024
Aerin Frankel	1st career PWHL win	January 13, 2024
Aerin Frankel	1st career PWHL overtime win	January 13, 2024
Loren Gabel	1st career PWHL goal	January 17, 2024
Loren Gabel	1st career PWHL assist	January 17, 2024
Emily Brown	1st career PWHL assist	January 17, 2024
Emma Söderberg	1st career PWHL game	January 17, 2024
Emma Söderberg	1st career PWHL win	January 17, 2024
Alina Müller	5th career PWHL assist	January 20, 2024
Emma Söderberg	1st career PWHL loss	January 20, 2024
Alina Müller	1st career PWHL goal	January 24, 2024
Jamie Lee Rattray	1st career PWHL goal	January 24, 2024
Megan Keller	1st career PWHL assist	January 24, 2024
Kaleigh Fratkin	1st career PWHL goal	January 27, 2024
Hilary Knight	1st career PWHL goal	January 27, 2024
Jessica Digirolamo	1st career PWHL assist	January 27, 2024
Shiann Darkangelo	1st career PWHL assist	January 27, 2024
Nicole Kosta	1st career PWHL assist	January 27, 2024
Hilary Knight	1st career PWHL assist	January 27, 2024
Sophie Shirley	1st career PWHL goal	February 4, 2024
Hanna Brandt	1st career PWHL assist	February 4, 2024
Taylor Girard	1st career PWHL assist	February 14, 2024
Madison Packer	1st career PWHL assist	February 17, 2024
Megan Keller	5th career PWHL assist	February 19, 2024
Jess Healey	1st career PWHL assist	February 21, 2024
Kaleigh Fratkin	1st career PWHL assist	February 21, 2024
Gigi Marvin	1st career PWHL goal	February 25, 2024
Jamie Lee Rattray	5th career PWHL assist	February 25, 2024
Jess Healey	1st career PWHL goal	March 6, 2024
Amanda Pelkey	1st career PWHL assist	March 6, 2024
Alina Müller	10th career PWHL assist	March 10, 2024
Susanna Tapani	5th career PWHL assist	March 10, 2024
Sidney Morin	1st career PWHL goal	March 20, 2024
Emily Brown	1st career PWHL goal	April 18, 2024
Nicole Kosta	1st career PWHL goal	April 20, 2024
Lexie Adzija	5th career PWHL assist	April 20, 2024
Megan Keller	10th career PWHL assist	April 20, 2024
Kelly Babstock	1st career PWHL game	April 20, 2024
Hilary Knight	5th career PWHL goal	April 24, 2024
Hannah Brandt	5th career PWHL goal	April 27, 2024
Alina Müller	5th career PWHL goal	May 4, 2024
Hilary Knight	5th career PWHL assist	May 4, 2024
Hannah Brandt	5th career PWHL assist	May 4, 2024
Kelly Babstock	1st career PWHL assist	May 4, 2024

== Transactions ==
Boston has been involved in the following transactions during the 2023–24 PWHL season.

=== Signings ===
Date	Player	Position	Term	Previous Team	Ref
September 7, 2023	Aerin Frankel	G	3 years	Team Adidas	
September 7, 2023	Megan Keller	D	3 years	Team Scotiabank	
September 7, 2023	Hilary Knight	F	3 years	Team Sonnet	
October 27, 2023	Sophie Jaques	D	3 years	Ohio State	
October 30, 2023	Alina Müller	F	3 years	Northeastern	
October 31, 2023	Emma Söderberg	G	2 years	Minnesota Duluth	
October 31, 2023	Jamie Lee Rattray	F	3 years	Team Harvey's	
November 1, 2023	Theresa Schafzahl	F	2 years	Vermont	
November 2, 2023	Sophie Shirley	F	1 year	Wisconsin	
November 2, 2023	Emma Buckles	D	1 year	Team Sonnet	
November 3, 2023	Hannah Brandt	F	1 year	Team Sonnet	
November 3, 2023	Jess Healey	D	1 year	Buffalo Beauts	
November 6, 2023	Emily Brown	D	1 year	Team Sonnet	
November 7, 2023	Kaleigh Fratkin	D	1 year	Boston Pride	
November 8, 2023	Taylor Girard	F	2 years	Connecticut Whale	
November 8, 2023	Jessica DiGirolamo	D	2 years	Team Adidas	
November 9, 2023	Shiann Darkangelo	F	1 year	Toronto Six	
November 9, 2023	Loren Gabel	F	2 years	Boston Pride	
November 10, 2023	Nicole Kosta	F	1 year	Team Scotiabank	
December 11, 2023	Cami Kronish	G	1 year	Wisconsin	
December 19, 2023	Taylor Wenczkowski	F	1 year	Boston Pride	
December 19, 2023	Sidney Morin	D	1 year	Minnesota Whitecaps	
December 20, 2023	Gigi Marvin	F	1 year	Team Adidas	
December 20, 2023	Amanda Pelkey	F	1 year	Metropolitan Riveters	

=== Trades ===
Date	Details		Ref
February 11, 2024	To Minnesota Sophie Jaques	To Boston Susanna Tapani; Abby Cook	

== Draft picks ==
Below are the PWHL Boston's selections at the 2023 PWHL draft held on September 18, 2023.

Rd	Pick	Player	Nationality	Position	Previous team
1	3	Alina Muller	Switzerland	Forward	Northeastern Huskies (Hockey East)
2	10	Sophie Jaques	Canada	Defence	Ohio State Buckeyes (WCHA)
3	15	Jamie Lee Rattray	Canada	Forward	Team Harvey's (PWHPA)
4	22	Loren Gabel	Canada	Forward	Boston Pride (PHF)
5	27	Hannah Brandt	United States	Forward	Team Sonnet (PWHPA)
6	34	Jessica DiGirolamo	Canada	Defence	Team Adidas (PWHPA)
7	39	Theresa Schafzahl	Austria	Forward	Vermont Catamounts (Hockey East)
8	46	Emily Brown	United States	Defence	Team Sonnet (PWHPA)
9	51	Taylor Girard	United States	Forward	Connecticut Whale (PHF)
10	58	Emma Söderberg	Sweden	Goaltender	Minnesota Duluth Bulldogs (WCHA)
11	63	Sophie Shirley	Canada	Forward	Wisconsin Badgers (WCHA)
12	70	Shiann Darkangelo	United States	Forward	Toronto Six (PHF)
13	75	Emma Buckles	Canada	Defence	Team Sonnet (PWHPA)
14	82	Tatum Skaggs	United States	Forward	Team Scotiabank (PWHPA)
15	87	Jess Healey	Canada	Defence	Buffalo Beauts (PHF)
