= 2023–24 PWHL Ottawa season =

Professional Women's Hockey League season

2023–24 PWHL Ottawa
- 2023–24 record: 8–1–6–9 (5th)
- Home record: 4–1–3–4
- Road record: 4–0–3–5
- Goals for: 62
- Goals against: 63

Team information
- General manager: Mike Hirshfeld
- Coach: Carla MacLeod
- Assistant coach: Haley Irwin; Cassea Schols
- Captain: Brianne Jenner
- Alternate captains: Emily Clark; Jincy Roese
- Arena: TD Place Arena
- Average attendance: 7,496 (87.3%)

Team leaders
- Goals: Daryl Watts (10)
- Assists: Kateřina Mrázová (12)
- Points: Brianne Jenner (20)
- Penalty minutes: Tereza Vanišová (21)
- Plus/minus: Ashton Bell (+3)
- Wins: Emerance Maschmeyer (9)
- Goals against average: Emerance Maschmeyer (2.30)

The 2023–24 PWHL Ottawa season was the team's inaugural season as a member of the newly created Professional Women's Hockey League (PWHL). They played their home games at TD Place Arena in Ottawa.

Ottawa finished the season on a three-game losing streak, and were eliminated from playoff contention in the final regular season game, a 5–2 loss to PWHL Toronto. Despite missing the playoffs, Ottawa led the league in attendance.

== Offseason ==
The team announced Mike Hirshfeld as their first employee in the summer of 2023 when he was named general manager. On August 31, it was announced that TD Place Arena would be the home venue for the team. On September 5, the team signed its first three players in Emily Clark, Brianne Jenner, and Emerance Maschmeyer. On September 15, the team named Carla MacLeod its head coach. On December 29, Jenner was named captain, with Clark and Jincy Roese to serve as assistant captains.

== Standings ==
Pos	Team	Pld	W	OTW	OTL	L	GF	GA	GD	Pts	Qualification
1	Toronto (Y)	24	13	4	0	7	69	50	+19	47	regular season winner and Playoffs
2	Montreal (X)	24	10	3	5	6	60	57	+3	41	Playoffs
3	Boston (X)	24	8	4	3	9	50	57	−7	35 (Note: Greater number of games won, excluding games won by Shootout: Boston 11 wins, Minnesota 10 wins)	Playoffs
4	Minnesota (X)	24	8	4	3	9	54	54	0	35	Playoffs
5	Ottawa (E)	24	8	1	6	9	62	63	−1	32	
6	New York (E)	24	5	4	3	12	53	67	−14	26	

Updated to match(es) played on May 5, 2024. Source: PWHL
(E) Eliminated; (X) Clinched playoff berth; (Y) Clinched first place

== Schedule and results ==
=== Regular season ===
On December 17, 2023, it was announced that the team had sold out its January 2 opening game against Montreal. With 8,318 fans in attendance at the game, it set a new record for attendance at a professional women's hockey game. Hayley Scamurra scored the first goal in franchise history during the game, but PWHL Montréal won the game in overtime by a score of 3–2. After its second scheduled game was postponed due to inclement weather, Ottawa secured its first ever win on January 13 with a 5–1 victory over PWHL Toronto. After dropping its first two home games in overtime, Ottawa won its first game at TD Place Arena on January 23, defeating Toronto by a score of 3–1.

Ottawa was in a position to clinch a playoff spot in late April, needing one regulation win with three games left on the schedule. However, Ottawa lost all three games, including a 4–3 decision against last place-PWHL New York, and narrowly missed out on the final playoff spot.

=== Regular season schedule ===
The regular season schedule was published on November 30, 2023.

Regular season schedule (Home: 4–1–3–4; Road: 4–0–3–5)
January: 2–0–3–1, 9 points (Home: 1–0–2–1; Road: 1–0–1–0)

Game	Date	Opponent	Score	OT	Decision	Location	Attendance	Record	Points	Recap
1	January 2	PWHL Montreal	2–3	OT	Maschmeyer	TD Place Arena	8,318	0–0–1–0	1	
–	January 8	@ PWHL Boston	Postponed due to inclement weather. Moved to February 19.							
2	January 13	@ PWHL Toronto	5–1		Maschmeyer	Mattamy Athletic Centre	2,416	1–0–1–0	4	
3	January 17	PWHL Minnesota	2–3	OT	Maschmeyer	TD Place Arena	5,609	1–0–2–0	5	
4	January 23	PWHL Toronto	3–1		Maschmeyer	TD Place Arena	6,316	2–0–2–0	8	
5	January 24	PWHL Boston	2–3		Maschmeyer	TD Place Arena	5,208	2–0–2–1	8	
6	January 27	@ PWHL Montreal	1–2	OT	Maschmeyer	Place Bell	8,646	2–0–3–1	9	

February: 2–0–1–4, 7 points (Home: 1–0–1–1; Road: 1–0–0–3)

Game	Date	Opponent	Score	OT	Decision	Location	Attendance	Record	Points	Recap
7	February 4	PWHL New York	3–4	OT	Maschmeyer	TD Place Arena	8,062	2–0–4–1	10	
8	February 14	@ PWHL Minnesota	1–2		Maschmeyer	Xcel Energy Center	6,276	2–0–4–2	10	
9	February 17	PWHL Minnesota	1–2		Maschmeyer	TD Place Arena	8,407	2–0–4–3	10	
10	February 19	@ PWHL Boston	4–2		Maschmeyer	Tsongas Center	2,849	3–0–4–3	13	
11	February 21	@ PWHL Boston	1–3		Maschmeyer	Tsongas Center	1,889	3–0–4–4	13	
12	February 24	@ PWHL Montreal	3–6		Maschmeyer	Verdun Auditorium	3,232	3–0–4–5	13	
13	February 28	PWHL New York	4–2		Maschmeyer	TD Place Arena	6,889	4–0–4–5	16	

March: 3–0–2–1, 11 points (Home: 1–0–0–1; Road: 2–0–2–0)

Game	Date	Opponent	Score	OT	Decision	Location	Attendance	Record	Points	Recap
14	March 2	PWHL Toronto	2–5		Maschmeyer	TD Place Arena	8,447	4–0–4–6	16	
15	March 5	@ PWHL Minnesota	3–4	SO	Abstreiter	Xcel Energy Center	4,585	4–0–5–6	17	
16	March 10	@ PWHL Montreal	4–2		Maschmeyer	Place Bell	10,172	5–0–5–6	20	
17	March 16	@ PWHL Boston	1–2	SO	Maschmeyer	Little Caesars Arena	13,736	5–0–6–6	21	
18	March 20	@ PWHL New York	3–0		Maschmeyer	Total Mortgage Arena	1,702	6–0–6–6	24	
19	March 23	PWHL Toronto	5–3		Maschmeyer	TD Place Arena	8,448	7–0–6–6	27	

April: 1–1–0–2, 5 points (Home: 1–1–0–1; Road: 0–0–0–1)

Game	Date	Opponent	Score	OT	Decision	Location	Attendance	Record	Points	Recap
20	April 20	PWHL Minnesota	4–0		Maschmeyer	TD Place Arena	8,110	8–0–6–6	30	
21	April 24	PWHL Boston	3–2	SO	Maschmeyer	TD Place Arena	7,686	8–1–6–6	32	
22	April 27	PWHL Montreal	0–2		Maschmeyer	TD Place Arena	8,452	8–1–6–7	32	
23	April 30	@ PWHL New York	3–4		Maschmeyer	Prudential Center	2,992	8–1–6–8	32	

May: 0–0–0–1, 0 points (Home: 0–0–0–0; Road: 0–0–0–1)

Game	Date	Opponent	Score	OT	Decision	Location	Attendance	Record	Points	Recap
24	May 5	@ PWHL Toronto	2–5		Maschmeyer	Mattamy Athletic Centre	2,620	8–1–6–9	32	

Regulation Win (3 points) Overtime/Shootout win (2 points) Overtime/shootout loss (1 point) Regulation Loss (0 points)

== Player statistics ==
= Indicates team leader

As of May 5, 2024

=== Skaters ===
Regular season
Player	GP	G	A	Pts	SOG	+/−	PIM
Brianne Jenner	24	9	11	20	78	+1	4
Kateřina Mrázová	23	6	12	18	30	–2	16
Daryl Watts	24	10	7	17	73	–2	8
Emily Clark	24	4	11	15	74	+2	10
Gabbie Hughes	24	9	3	12	61	+1	20
Savannah Harmon	24	3	9	12	49	–2	8
Hayley Scamurra	24	5	5	10	91	+2	2
Aneta Tejralová	23	2	6	8	20	–5	8
Ashton Bell	24	2	5	7	36	+3	2
Natalie Snodgrass	23	1	5	6	30	–3	10
Jincy Roese	24	0	5	5	30	–10	14
Zoe Boyd	16	0	3	3	11	–3	2
Becca Gilmore	22	0	3	3	21	–11	2
Akane Shiga	24	2	0	2	17	–1	4
Tereza Vanišová	6	0	2	2	7	–2	21
Kristin Della Rovere	9	1	0	1	7	+2	0
Fanni Garát-Gasparics	15	1	0	1	17	–1	4
Shiann Darkangelo	7	0	0	0	5	–1	4
Malia Schneider	2	0	0	0	1	0	0
Sammy Davis	9	0	0	0	1	0	0
Samantha Isbell	7	0	0	0	1	+1	0
Rosalie Demers	13	0	0	0	6	–1	4
Emma Buckles	15	0	0	0	3	0	0

=== Goaltenders ===
= Indicates league leader

Regular season
Player	GP	TOI	W	L	OT	GA	GAA	SA	SV%	SO	G	A	PIM
Emerance Maschmeyer	23	1332:07	9	9	4	51	2.30	599	0.915	2	0	1	0
Sandra Abstreiter	3	116:42	0	0	0	6	3.08	69	0.913	0	0	0	0

== Awards and honours ==
=== Milestones ===
Regular season
Player	Milestone	Reached
Hayley Scamurra	1st goal in franchise history	January 2, 2024
Hayley Scamurra	1st career PWHL goal	January 2, 2024
Hayley Scamurra	1st career PWHL game	January 2, 2024
Kateřina Mrázová	1st career PWHL goal	January 2, 2024
Kateřina Mrázová	1st career PWHL game	January 2, 2024
Ashton Bell	1st assist in franchise history	January 2, 2024
Ashton Bell	1st career PWHL assist	January 2, 2024
Ashton Bell	1st career PWHL game	January 2, 2024
Zoe Boyd	1st career PWHL assist	January 2, 2024
Zoe Boyd	1st career PWHL game	January 2, 2024
Lexie Adzija	1st career PWHL assist	January 2, 2024
Lexie Adzija	1st career PWHL game	January 2, 2024
Aneta Tejralová	1st career PWHL game	January 2, 2024
Daryl Watts	1st career PWHL game	January 2, 2024
Becca Gilmore	1st career PWHL game	January 2, 2024
Akane Shiga	1st career PWHL game	January 2, 2024
Mikyla Grant-Mentis	1st career PWHL game	January 2, 2024
Savannah Harmon	1st career PWHL game	January 2, 2024
Gabbie Hughes	1st career PWHL game	January 2, 2024
Brianne Jenner	1st career PWHL game	January 2, 2024
Kristin Della Rovere	1st career PWHL game	January 2, 2024
Emily Clark	1st career PWHL game	January 2, 2024
Amanda Boulier	1st career PWHL game	January 2, 2024
Jincy Roese	1st career PWHL game	January 2, 2024
Fanni Garát-Gasparics	1st career PWHL game	January 2, 2024
Emerance Maschmeyer	1st loss in franchise history	January 2, 2024
Emerance Maschmeyer	1st career PWHL loss	January 2, 2024
Emerance Maschmeyer	1st career PWHL overtime loss	January 2, 2024
Gabbie Hughes	1st career PWHL goal	January 13, 2024
Daryl Watts	1st career PWHL goal	January 13, 2024
Natalie Snodgrass	1st career PWHL goal	January 13, 2024
Jincy Roese	1st career PWHL assist	January 13, 2024
Amanda Boulier	1st career PWHL assist	January 13, 2024
Mikyla Grant-Mentis	1st career PWHL assist	January 13, 2024
Savannah Harmon	1st career PWHL assist	January 13, 2024
Emerance Maschmeyer	1st win in franchise history	January 13, 2024
Emerance Maschmeyer	1st career PWHL win	January 13, 2024
Emerance Maschmeyer	1st career PWHL assist	January 13, 2024
Savannah Harmon	1st career PWHL goal	January 17, 2024
Lexie Adzija	1st career PWHL goal	January 17, 2024
Emily Clark	1st career PWHL assist	January 17, 2024
Gabbie Hughes	1st career PWHL assist	January 17, 2024
Kateřina Mrázová	1st career PWHL assist	January 17, 2024
Emily Clark	1st career PWHL goal	January 23, 2024
Brianne Jenner	1st career PWHL goal	January 23, 2024
Lexie Adzija	1st career PWHL shorthanded goal	January 23, 2024
Kristin Della Rovere	1st career PWHL goal	January 24, 2024
Lexie Adzija	1st career power play goal	January 24, 2024
Natalie Snodgrass	1st career PWHL assist	January 24, 2024
Hayley Scamurra	1st career PWHL assist	January 24, 2024
Brianne Jenner	1st career PWHL assist	January 24, 2024
Maureen Murphy	1st career PWHL goal	January 27, 2024
Victoria Howran	1st career PWHL game	January 27, 2024
Aneta Tejralová	1st career PWHL game	February 4, 2024
Daryl Watts	1st career PWHL assist	February 4, 2024
Amanda Boulier	1st career PWHL goal	February 14, 2024
Aneta Tejralová	1st career PWHL assist	February 14, 2024
Becca Gilmore	1st career PWHL assist	February 14, 2024
Emily Clark	5th career PWHL assist	February 19, 2024
Akane Shiga	1st career PWHL goal	February 24, 2024
Fanni Garát-Gasparics	1st career PWHL goal	February 28, 2024
Fanni Garát-Gasparics	1st career short-handed goal	February 28, 2024
Gabbie Hughes	5th career PWHL goal	February 28, 2024
Lexie Adzija	5th career PWHL goal	February 28, 2024
Amanda Boulier	5th career PWHL assist	February 28, 2024
Ashton Bell	1st career PWHL goal	March 2, 2024
Kateřina Mrázová	5th career PWHL goal	March 5, 2024
Brianne Jenner	5th career PWHL assist	March 5, 2024
Daryl Watts	5th career PWHL assist	March 5, 2024
Kateřina Mrázová	5th career PWHL assist	March 10, 2024
Aneta Tejralová	5th career PWHL assist	March 10, 2024
Daryl Watts	5th career PWHL goal	March 20, 2024
Jincy Roese	5th career PWHL assist	March 20, 2024
Emerance Maschmeyer	1st career PWHL shutout	March 20, 2024
Natalie Spooner	15th career PWHL goal	March 23, 2024
Sarah Nurse	5th career PWHL goal	March 23, 2024
Tereza Vanišová	10th career PWHL assist	April 20, 2024
Emily Clark	10th career PWHL assist	April 24, 2024
Daryl Watts	10th career PWHL goal	May 5, 2024
Hayley Scamurra	5th career PWHL assist	May 5, 2024

== Transactions ==
=== Signings ===
Date	Player	Position	Term	Previous Team	Ref
September 5, 2023	Emily Clark	F	3 years	Team Harvey's	
September 5, 2023	Brianne Jenner	F	3 years	Team Sonnet	
September 5, 2023	Emerance Maschmeyer	G	3 years	Team Scotiabank	
October 26, 2023	Lexie Adzija	F	1 year	Quinnipiac	
October 27, 2023	Jincy Roese	D	2 years	Team Adidas	
October 30, 2023	Gabbie Hughes	F	3 years	Minnesota Duluth	
October 31, 2023	Zoe Boyd	D	1 year	Quinnipiac	
November 1, 2023	Hayley Scamurra	F	2 years	Team Harvey's	
November 1, 2023	Ashton Bell	D	3 years	Minnesota Duluth	
November 2, 2023	Daryl Watts	F	1 year	Toronto Six	
November 2, 2023	Kristin Della Rovere	F	1 year	Harvard	
November 3, 2023	Amanda Boulier	D	1 year	Minnesota Whitecaps	
November 6, 2023	Becca Gilmore	F	1 year	Boston Pride	
November 7, 2023	Aneta Tejralová	D	1 year	Boston Pride	
November 7, 2023	Kateřina Mrázová	F	1 year	Connecticut Whale	
November 8, 2023	Savannah Harmon	D	3 years	Team Harvey's	
November 9, 2023	Sandra Abstreiter	G	1 year	Providence	
December 20, 2023	Tori Howran	D	1 year	Connecticut Whale	
December 20, 2023	Mikyla Grant-Mentis	F	1 year	Buffalo Beauts	
December 21, 2023	Natalie Snodgrass	F	1 year	Minnesota Whitecaps	
December 21, 2023	Rachel McQuigge	G	1 year	Metropolitan Riveters	
December 22, 2023	Fanni Garát-Gasparics	F	1 year	Metropolitan Riveters	
December 22, 2023	Akane Shiga	F	1 year	Japan	

== Draft picks ==
Below are the PWHL Ottawa's selections at the 2023 PWHL draft held on September 18, 2023.

Round	Pick	Player	Nationality	Position	Previous team
1	5	Savannah Harmon	United States	Defence	Team Harvey's (PWHPA)
2	8	Ashton Bell	Canada	Defence	Minnesota Duluth (WCHA)
3	17	Jincy Roese	United States	Defence	Team Adidas (PWHPA)
4	20	Gabbie Hughes	United States	Forward	Minnesota Duluth (WCHA)
5	29	Hayley Scamurra	United States	Forward	Team Harvey's (PWHPA)
6	32	Daryl Watts	Canada	Forward	Toronto Six (PHF)
7	41	Aneta Tejralova	Czech Republic	Defence	Boston Pride (PHF)
8	44	Katerina Mrazova	Czech Republic	Forward	Connecticut Whale (PHF)
9	53	Zoe Boyd	Canada	Defence	Quinnipiac University (ECAC)
10	56	Kristin Della Rovere	Canada	Forward	Harvard University (ECAC)
11	65	Lexie Adzija	Canada	Forward	Quinnipiac University (ECAC)
12	68	Sandra Abstreiter	Germany	Goaltender	Connecticut Whale (PHF)
13	77	Amanda Boulier	United States	Defence	Minnesota Whitecaps (PHF)
14	80	Caitrin Lonergan	United States	Forward	Connecticut Whale (PHF)
15	89	Audrey-Anne Veillette	Canada	Forward	Montreal (RSEQ)
