= 2023–24 PWHL Toronto season =

Professional Women's Hockey League season

2023–24 PWHL Toronto
- 2023–24 record: 13–4–0–7 (1st)
- Home record: 8–1–0–3
- Road record: 5–3–0–4
- Goals for: 69
- Goals against: 50

Team information
- General manager: Gina Kingsbury
- Coach: Troy Ryan
- Assistant coach: Rachel Flanagan
- Captain: Blayre Turnbull
- Alternate captains: Renata Fast; Jocelyne Larocque
- Arena: Mattamy Athletic Centre; Scotiabank Arena; Coca-Cola Coliseum
- Average attendance: 3,912

Team leaders
- Goals: Natalie Spooner (20)
- Assists: Emma Maltais (15)
- Points: Natalie Spooner (27)
- Penalty minutes: Jesse Compher (23)
- Plus/minus: Natalie Spooner (+11)
- Wins: Kristen Campbell (16)
- Goals against average: Erica Howe (1.89)

The 2023–24 PWHL Toronto season was the team's inaugural season as a member of the newly created Professional Women's Hockey League (PWHL). They played the majority of their home games at the Mattamy Athletic Centre in Toronto, hosting one game at Scotiabank Arena and their playoff games at Coca-Cola Coliseum.

Toronto topped the regular season standings, becoming the first team to clinch a playoff spot on April 22, 2024. On May 1, the team clinched first overall. Natalie Spooner led the team and the league in goals, with 20, and points, with 27. By virtue of finishing first, Toronto had the option to select its semifinal opponent, and Toronto chose PWHL Minnesota. Toronto was upset by eventual Walter Cup champion Minnesota, losing three straight after winning the first two. After the season, Spooner was named the winner of the league's inaugural Billie Jean King MVP Award as most valuable player; she was also named the league's top forward, while Kristen Campbell was named the top goaltender and Troy Ryan the coach of the year.

== Offseason ==
On September 1, 2023, PWHL Toronto hired Gina Kingsbury as its first general manager. Troy Ryan was named as Toronto's first head coach on September 15, and Rachel Flanagan was hired as assistant coach on October 6. On November 28, it was revealed that Toronto would play their home games at the Mattamy Athletic Centre.

On September 6, Toronto announced the signings of their first three players, Canadian national team members Sarah Nurse, Renata Fast, and Blayre Turnbull. On December 29, Turnbull was named captain, with Fast and second overall draft pick Jocelyne Larocque named assistant captains.

== Standings ==
Pos	Team	Pld	W	OTW	OTL	L	GF	GA	GD	Pts	Qualification
1	Toronto (Y)	24	13	4	0	7	69	50	+19	47	Playoffs
2	Montreal (X)	24	10	3	5	6	60	57	+3	41	Playoffs
3	Boston (X)	24	8	4	3	9	50	57	−7	35 (Note: Greater number of games won, excluding games won by Shootout: Boston 11 wins, Minnesota 10 wins)	Playoffs
4	Minnesota (X)	24	8	4	3	9	54	54	0	35	Playoffs
5	Ottawa (E)	24	8	1	6	9	62	63	−1	32	
6	New York (E)	24	5	4	3	12	53	67	−14	26	

Updated to match(es) played on May 5, 2024. Source: PWHL
(E) Eliminated; (X) Clinched playoff berth; (Y) Clinched first place

== Schedule and results ==
=== Regular season ===
Toronto hosted the first ever PWHL game at a sold-out Mattamy Athletic Centre on January 1, 2024. PWHL New York won the game by a score of 4–0. Toronto won its first game in a re-match against New York on January 5, winning by a score of 3–2.

On January 25, it was announced that Toronto would host its February 16 match against PWHL Montreal at Scotiabank Arena, in a game dubbed by the league as "The Battle on Bay Street". The game set a league and women’s hockey attendance record with a sellout crowd of 19,285, beating the previous record of 18,013 set at the 2013 IIHF Women's World Championship.

Despite losing four of its first five games and sitting last overall two weeks into the season, Toronto became the first team to clinch a playoff spot on April 22 after an 11-game win streak. The team went on to clinch first overall in the league standings.

=== Regular season schedule ===
The regular season schedule was published on November 30, 2023.

Regular season schedule (Home: 8–1–0–3; Road: 5–3–0–4)
January: 2–1–0–5, 8 points (Home: 1–0–0–3; Road: 1–1–0–2)

Game	Date	Opponent	Score	OT	Decision	Location	Attendance	Record	Points	Recap
1	January 1	PWHL New York	0–4		Campbell	Mattamy Athletic Centre	2,537	0–0–0–1	0	
2	January 5	@ PWHL New York	3–2		Campbell	Total Mortgage Arena	2,152	1–0–0–1	3	
3	January 10	@ PWHL Minnesota	1–3		Campbell	Xcel Energy Center	4,707	1–0–0–2	3	
4	January 13	PWHL Ottawa	1–5		Campbell	Mattamy Athletic Centre	2,417	1–0–0–3	3	
5	January 17	PWHL Boston	2–3		Campbell	Mattamy Athletic Centre	2,491	1–0–0–4	3	
6	January 20	@ PWHL Montreal	4–3	SO	Campbell	Verdun Auditorium	3,232	1–1–0–4	5	
7	January 23	@ PWHL Ottawa	1–3		Howe	TD Place Arena	6,316	1–1–0–5	5	
8	January 26	PWHL New York	2–0		Campbell	Mattamy Athletic Centre	2,506	2–1–0–5	8	

February: 3–2–0–0, 13 points (Home: 2–1–0–0; Road: 1–1–0–0)

Game	Date	Opponent	Score	OT	Decision	Location	Attendance	Record	Points	Recap
9	February 3	PWHL Minnesota	4–1		Campbell	Mattamy Athletic Centre	2,470	3–1–0–5	11	
10	February 14	@ PWHL Boston	5–3		Campbell	Tsongas Center	1,791	4–1–0–5	14	
11	February 16	PWHL Montreal	3–0		Campbell	Scotiabank Arena	19,285	5–1–0–5	17	
12	February 23	PWHL New York	2–1	SO	Campbell	Mattamy Athletic Centre	2,494	5–2–0–5	19	
13	February 27	@ PWHL Minnesota	4–3	OT	Campbell	3M Arena at Mariucci	2,718	5–3–0–5	21	

March: 5–0–0–1, 15 points (Home: 3–0–0–0; Road: 2–0–0–1)

Game	Date	Opponent	Score	OT	Decision	Location	Attendance	Record	Points	Recap
14	March 2	@ PWHL Ottawa	5–2		Campbell	TD Place Arena	8,447	6–3–0–5	24	
15	March 6	PWHL Boston	3–1		Campbell	Mattamy Athletic Centre	2,479	7–3–0–5	27	
16	March 8	PWHL Montreal	3–0		Campbell	Mattamy Athletic Centre	2,554	8–3–0–5	30	
17	March 17	@ PWHL Montreal	2–1		Campbell	PPG Paints Arena	8,850	9–3–0–5	33	
18	March 20	PWHL Boston	2–1		Howe	Mattamy Athletic Centre	2,525	10–3–0–5	36	
19	March 23	@ PWHL Ottawa	3–5		Campbell	TD Place Arena	8,448	10–3–0–6	36	

April: 1–1–0–1, 5 points (Home: 0–0–0–0; Road: 1–1–0–1)

Game	Date	Opponent	Score	OT	Decision	Location	Attendance	Record	Points	Recap
20	April 18	@ PWHL Boston	1–2		Campbell	Tsongas Center	4,084	10–3–0–7	36	
21	April 20	@ PWHL Montreal	3–2	OT	Campbell	Bell Centre	21,105	10–4–0–7	38	
22	April 28	@ PWHL New York	6–2		Campbell	UBS Arena	1,668	11–4–0–7	41	

May: 2–0–0–0, 6 points (Home: 2–0–0–0; Road: 0–0–0–0)

Game	Date	Opponent	Score	OT	Decision	Location	Attendance	Record	Points	Recap
23	May 1	PWHL Minnesota	4–1		Campbell	Mattamy Athletic Centre	2,571	12–4–0–7	44	
24	May 5	PWHL Ottawa	5–2		Campbell	Mattamy Athletic Centre	2,620	13–4–0–7	47	

Regulation Win (3 points) Overtime/Shootout win (2 points) Overtime/shootout loss (1 point) Regulation Loss (0 points)

=== Playoffs ===
On May 6, 2024, Toronto elected to play PWHL Minnesota in the first round of the playoffs. Toronto announced that it would play its post-season home games at Coca-Cola Coliseum, which offers more seating than Mattamy Athletic Centre.

Toronto won the first two games of the series, both at home, without allowing a single goal against. However, leading scorer Natalie Spooner was injured in Game 3, and she would not return for the rest of the series. Toronto failed to score a goal in back-to-back losses in Minnesota, including a double-overtime defeat in Game 4. Minnesota completed its comeback and upset in Game 5, securing a 4–1 victory and eliminating Toronto from the playoffs.

2024 PWHL Playoffs
First round vs. PWHL Minnesota: Minnesota won 3–2

Game	Date	Opponent	Score	OT	Decision	Location	Attendance	Series	Recap
1	May 8	Minnesota	4–0		Campbell	Coca-Cola Coliseum	8,473	1–0	
2	May 10	Minnesota	2–0		Campbell	Coca-Cola Coliseum	8,581	2–0	
3	May 13	@ Minnesota	0–2		Campbell	Xcel Energy Center	3,344	2–1	
4	May 15	@ Minnesota	0–1	2OT	Campbell	Xcel Energy Center	2,766	2–2	
5	May 17	Minnesota	1–4		Campbell	Coca-Cola Coliseum	8,501	2–3	

== Player statistics ==
= Indicates team leader

= Indicates league leader

As of May 17, 2024

=== Skaters ===
Regular season
Player	GP	G	A	Pts	SOG	+/−	PIM
Natalie Spooner	24	20	7	27	101	+11	4
Sarah Nurse	24	11	12	23	67	+6	14
Emma Maltais	24	4	15*	19	44	+7	16
Hannah Miller	23	7	7	14	39	+6	8
Renata Fast	24	3	10	13	49	0	12
Jocelyne Larocque	23	1	9	10	42	+8	6
Blayre Turnbull	24	3	6	9	63	+4	16
Rebecca Leslie	24	2	7	9	36	+2	12
Brittany Howard	23	2	6	8	33	0	10
Maggie Connors	24	3	3	6	35	+2	6
Kali Flanagan	24	3	3	6	29	+7	2
Allie Munroe	24	1	5	6	17	+1	12
Victoria Bach	16	2	3	5	25	+3	2
Jesse Compher	24	1	4	5	31	–1	23
Samantha Cogan	23	2	0	2	18	–6	6
Alexa Vasko	24	2	0	2	14	–2	4
Olivia Knowles	20	0	1	1	6	+7	6
Kaitlin Willoughby	23	0	1	1	9	–3	2
Lauriane Rougeau	24	0	1	1	12	+4	4
Jess Jones	5	0	0	0	0	0	0
Maude Poulin-Labelle	11	0	0	0	5	–4	0

Playoffs
Player	GP	G	A	Pts	SOG	+/−	PIM
Hannah Miller	5	1	2	3	7	+3	0
Renata Fast	5	0	3	3	9	+1	4
Blayre Turnbull	5	2	0	2	16	+2	0
Natalie Spooner	3	1	1	2	10	+4	0
Emma Maltais	5	1	1	2	6	–1	2
Jesse Compher	5	1	0	1	9	–1	2
Rebecca Leslie	5	1	0	1	9	+2	0
Victoria Bach	5	0	1	1	2	0	0
Kali Flanagan	5	0	1	1	5	+1	2
Brittany Howard	5	0	1	1	12	+1	0
Jocelyne Larocque	5	0	1	1	3	+1	6
Allie Munroe	5	0	1	1	2	+1	6
Sarah Nurse	5	0	1	1	8	–2	4
Jess Jones	2	0	0	0	0	0	0
Samantha Cogan	5	0	0	0	3	–1	0
Maggie Connors	5	0	0	0	7	–2	0
Olivia Knowles	5	0	0	0	2	0	2
Lauriane Rougeau	5	0	0	0	0	0	0
Alexa Vasko	5	0	0	0	1	0	2
Kaitlin Willoughby	5	0	0	0	4	–1	0

- Tied with Alex Carpenter (NY)

=== Goaltenders ===
Regular season
Player	GP	TOI	W	L	OT	GA	GAA	SA	SV%	SO	G	A	PIM
Kristen Campbell	22	1293:57	16	6	0	43	1.99	587	0.927	3	0	1	0
Erica Howe	3	158:24	1	1	0	5	1.89	63	0.921	0	0	0	0

Playoffs
Player	GP	TOI	W	L	OT	GA	GAA	SA	SV%	SO	G	A	PIM
Kristen Campbell	5	321:03	2	2	1	5	0.93	131	0.962	2	0	0	0

== Awards and honours ==
=== Milestones ===
Regular season
Date	Player	Milestone
January 1, 2024	Jocelyne Larocque	1st career PWHL game
January 1, 2024	Lauriane Rougeau	1st career PWHL game
January 1, 2024	Kali Flanagan	1st career PWHL game
January 1, 2024	Olivia Knowles	1st career PWHL game
January 1, 2024	Alexa Vasko	1st career PWHL game
January 1, 2024	Allie Munroe	1st career PWHL game
January 1, 2024	Renata Fast	1st career PWHL game
January 1, 2024	Samantha Cogan	1st career PWHL game
January 1, 2024	Jesse Compher	1st career PWHL game
January 1, 2024	Rebecca Leslie	1st career PWHL game
January 1, 2024	Sarah Nurse	1st career PWHL game
January 1, 2024	Maggie Connors	1st career PWHL game
January 1, 2024	Natalie Spooner	1st career PWHL game
January 1, 2024	Emma Maltais	1st career PWHL game
January 1, 2024	Kaitlin Willoughby	1st career PWHL game
January 1, 2024	Hannah Miller	1st career PWHL game
January 1, 2024	Blayre Turnbull	1st career PWHL game
January 1, 2024	Brittany Howard	1st career PWHL game
January 1, 2024	Maude Poulin-Labelle	1st career PWHL game
January 1, 2024	Kristen Campbell	1st career PWHL game
January 1, 2024	Kristen Campbell	1st career PWHL loss
January 5, 2024	Natalie Spooner	1st goal in franchise history
January 5, 2024	Natalie Spooner	1st career PWHL goal
January 5, 2024	Natalie Spooner	1st career PWHL power-play goal
January 5, 2024	Alexa Vasko	1st career PWHL goal
January 5, 2024	Emma Maltais	1st career PWHL goal
January 5, 2024	Emma Maltais	1st career PWHL short-handed goal
January 5, 2024	Sarah Nurse	1st assist in franchise history
January 5, 2024	Sarah Nurse	1st career PWHL assist
January 5, 2024	Renata Fast	1st career PWHL assist
January 5, 2024	Rebecca Leslie	1st career PWHL assist
January 5, 2024	Brittany Howard	1st career PWHL assist
January 5, 2024	Jesse Compher	1st career PWHL assist
January 5, 2024	Jocelyne Larocque	1st career PWHL assist
January 5, 2024	Kristen Campbell	1st career PWHL win
January 10, 2024	Sarah Nurse	1st career PWHL goal
January 13, 2024	Allie Munroe	1st career PWHL assist
January 13, 2024	Emma Maltais	1st career PWHL assist
January 17, 2024	Hannah Miller	1st career PWHL goal
January 20, 2024	Jocelyne Larocque	1st career PWHL goal
January 20, 2024	Maggie Connors	1st career PWHL goal
January 20, 2024	Maggie Connors	1st career PWHL assist
January 20, 2024	Rebecca Leslie	5th career PWHL assist
January 20, 2024	Kristen Campbell	1st career shoot-out win
January 23, 2024	Brittany Howard	1st career PWHL goal
January 23, 2024	Blayre Turnbull	1st career PWHL assist
January 26, 2024	Hannah Miller	1st career PWHL assist
January 26, 2024	Natalie Spooner	5th career PWHL goal
January 26, 2024	Kristen Campbell	1st career PWHL shutout
February 3, 2024	Renata Fast	1st career PWHL goal
February 3, 2024	Blayre Turnbull	1st career PWHL goal
February 3, 2024	Natalie Spooner	1st career PWHL assist
February 14, 2024	Natalie Spooner	1st career PWHL hat-trick
February 14, 2024	Natalie Spooner	10th career PWHL goal
February 14, 2024	Kali Flanagan	1st career PWHL goal
February 14, 2024	Lauriane Rougeau	1st career PWHL assist
February 14, 2024	Kristen Campbell	1st career PWHL assist
February 14, 2024	Emma Maltais	5th career PWHL assist
February 14, 2024	Victoria Bach	1st career PWHL game
February 16, 2024	Jesse Compher	1st career PWHL goal
February 16, 2024	Victoria Bach	1st career PWHL goal
February 23, 2024	Jocelyne Larocque	5th career PWHL assist
February 27, 2024	Victoria Bach	1st career PWHL assist
March 2, 2024	Samantha Cogan	1st career PWHL goal
March 2, 2024	Sarah Nurse	5th career PWHL assist
March 2, 2024	Renata Fast	5th career PWHL assist
March 6, 2024	Allie Munroe	1st career PWHL goal
March 8, 2024	Hannah Miller	5th career PWHL goal
March 8, 2024	Rebecca Leslie	1st career PWHL goal
March 8, 2024	Blayre Turnbull	5th career PWHL assist
March 8, 2024	Olivia Knowles	1st career PWHL assist
March 17, 2024	Natalie Spooner	5th career PWHL assist
March 17, 2024	Kali Flanagan	1st career PWHL assist
March 20, 2024	Sarah Nurse	10th career PWHL assist
March 23, 2024	Natalie Spooner	15th career PWHL goal
March 23, 2024	Sarah Nurse	15th career PWHL goal
March 23, 2024	Sarah Nurse	5th career PWHL goal
April 18, 2024	Emma Maltais	10th career PWHL assist
April 20, 2024	Allie Munroe	5th career PWHL assist
April 28, 2024	Sarah Nurse	1st career PWHL hat-trick
April 28, 2024	Sarah Nurse	10th career PWHL goal
April 28, 2024	Hannah Miller	5th career PWHL assist
April 28, 2024	Brittany Howard	5th career PWHL assist
May 1, 2024	Emma Maltais	15th career PWHL assist
May 1, 2024	Renata Fast	10th career PWHL assist
May 5, 2024	Natalie Spooner	20th career PWHL goal
May 5, 2024	Kaitlin Willoughby	1st career PWHL assist

Playoffs
Date	Player	Milestone
May 8, 2024	Natalie Spooner	1st career PWHL playoff goal
May 8, 2024	Natalie Spooner	1st career PWHL playoff assist
May 8, 2024	Emma Maltais	1st career PWHL playoff goal
May 8, 2024	Blayre Turnbull	1st career PWHL playoff goal
May 8, 2024	Renata Fast	1st career PWHL playoff assist
May 8, 2024	Jocelyne Larocque	1st career PWHL playoff assist
May 8, 2024	Hannah Miller	1st career PWHL playoff assist
May 8, 2024	Allie Munroe	1st career PWHL playoff assist
May 8, 2024	Sarah Nurse	1st career PWHL playoff assist
May 8, 2024	Olivia Knowles	1st career PWHL playoff penalty
May 8, 2024	Kristen Campbell	1st career PWHL playoff win
May 8, 2024	Kristen Campbell	1st career PWHL playoff shutout
May 10, 2024	Jesse Compher	1st career PWHL playoff goal
May 10, 2024	Hannah Miller	1st career PWHL playoff goal
May 10, 2024	Brittany Howard	1st career PWHL playoff assist
May 10, 2024	Emma Maltais	1st career PWHL playoff assist
May 10, 2024	Jocelyne Larocque	1st career PWHL playoff penalty
May 10, 2024	Allie Munroe	1st career PWHL playoff penalty
May 10, 2024	Alexa Vasko	1st career PWHL playoff penalty
May 13, 2024	Renata Fast	1st career PWHL playoff penalty
May 13, 2024	Kali Flanagan	1st career PWHL playoff penalty
May 13, 2024	Sarah Nurse	1st career PWHL playoff penalty
May 13, 2024	Kristen Campbell	1st career PWHL playoff loss
May 15, 2024	Jesse Compher	1st career PWHL playoff penalty
May 15, 2024	Emma Maltais	1st career PWHL playoff penalty
May 15, 2024	Kristen Campbell	1st career PWHL playoff overtime loss
May 17, 2024	Rebecca Leslie	1st career PWHL playoff goal
May 17, 2024	Victoria Bach	1st career PWHL playoff assist
May 17, 2024	Kali Flanagan	1st career PWHL playoff assist

=== League awards ===
Award winners
Award	Recipient
Billie Jean King MVP Award Most valuable player, regular season	Natalie Spooner
Forward of the Year	Natalie Spooner
Goaltender of the Year	Kristen Campbell
Coach of the Year	Troy Ryan
Points Leader Regular season	Natalie Spooner – 27
Goals Leader Regular season	Natalie Spooner – 20

== Transactions ==
=== Signings ===
Date	Player	Position	Term	Previous Team	Ref
September 6, 2023	Sarah Nurse	F	3 years	Team Adidas	
September 6, 2023	Renata Fast	D	3 years	Team Adidas	
September 6, 2023	Blayre Turnbull	F	3 years	Team Scotiabank	
October 31, 2023	Maggie Connors	F	2 years	Princeton Tigers	
November 2, 2023	Rebecca Leslie	F	1 year	Team Sonnet	
November 3, 2023	Emma Maltais	F	3 years	Ohio State Buckeyes	
November 7, 2023	Jesse Compher	F	2 years	Wisconsin Badgers	
November 8, 2023	Jocelyne Larocque	D	3 years	Team Adidas	
November 8, 2023	Kristen Campbell	G	3 years	Team Scotiabank	
November 9, 2023	Brittany Howard	F	1 year	Toronto Six	
November 9, 2023	Allie Munroe	D	1 year	Connecticut Whale	
November 10, 2023	Kali Flanagan	D	2 years	Boston Pride	
November 10, 2023	Erica Howe	G	1 year	Team Sonnet	
November 14, 2023	Natalie Spooner	F	2 years	Team Scotiabank	
November 15, 2023	Hannah Miller	F	1 year	Shenzhen KRS	
November 29, 2023	Alexa Vasko	F	1 year	Team Sonnet	

== Draft picks ==
Below are the PWHL Toronto's selections at the 2023 PWHL draft held on September 18, 2023.

Round	Pick	Player	Nationality	Position	Previous team
1	2	Jocelyne Larocque	Canada	Defence	Team Adidas (PWHPA)
2	11	Emma Maltais	Canada	Forward	Ohio State Buckeyes (WCHA)
3	14	Kristen Campbell	Canada	Goaltender	Team Scotiabank (PWHPA)
4	23	Natalie Spooner	Canada	Forward	Team Scotiabank (PWHPA)
5	26	Jesse Compher	United States	Forward	Wisconsin Badgers (WCHA)
6	35	Kali Flanagan	United States	Defence	Boston Pride (PHF)
7	38	Victoria Bach	Canada	Forward	Team Scotiabank (PWHPA)
8	47	Brittany Howard	Canada	Forward	Toronto Six (PHF)
9	50	Allie Munroe	Canada	Defence	Connecticut Whale (PHF)
10	59	Mellissa Channell	Canada	Defence	Team Harvey's (PWHPA)
11	62	Maggie Connors	Canada	Forward	Princeton Tigers (ECAC)
12	71	Rebecca Leslie	Canada	Forward	Team Sonnet (PWHPA)
13	74	Hannah Miller	Canada	Forward	Shenzhen Kunlun Red Star (ZhHL)
14	83	Alexa Vasko	Canada	Forward	Team Sonnet (PWHPA)
15	86	Olivia Knowles	Canada	Defence	Minnesota Whitecaps (PHF)
