= 2023–24 PWHL Montreal season =

Professional Women's Hockey League season

2023–24 PWHL Montreal
- 2023–24 record: 10–3–5–6 (2nd)
- Home record: 6–1–3–2
- Road record: 4–2–2–4
- Goals for: 60
- Goals against: 57

Team information
- General manager: Danièle Sauvageau
- Coach: Kori Cheverie
- Assistant coach: Eric Houde
- Captain: Marie-Philip Poulin
- Alternate captains: Erin Ambrose; Laura Stacey; Kristin O'Neill
- Arena: Verdun Auditorium, Place Bell
- Average attendance: 6,881

Team leaders
- Goals: Laura Stacey; Marie-Philip Poulin (10)
- Assists: Erin Ambrose (14)
- Points: Marie-Philip Poulin (23)
- Penalty minutes: Sarah Bujold (18)
- Plus/minus: Marie-Philip Poulin (+8)
- Wins: Ann-Renée Desbiens (7)
- Goals against average: Elaine Chuli (1.61)

The 2023–24 PWHL Montréal season was the team's inaugural season as a member of the newly created Professional Women's Hockey League. They played their home games at Verdun Auditorium in Montreal and Place Bell in the suburb of Laval. They also played one game at the Bell Centre on April 20.

Montréal finished second overall in the league standings, clinching a playoff berth on April 24, 2024, with a 5–2 victory over PWHL New York. Montréal faced PWHL Boston in the playoff semifinal. Montréal lost the series in three straight games, with all three decisions coming in overtime, including a triple-overtime loss in the second game of the series. After the season, Erin Ambrose won defender of the year honours from the league.

== Offseason ==
On September 1, 2023, Montréal hired Daniele Sauvageau as its general manager. The team then hired Kori Cheverie as its first head coach on September 13. In November, it was announced that the team would split its home games between Verdun Auditorium and Place Bell.

On September 5, Montréal announced the signings of its first three players, Canadian national team members Marie-Philip Poulin, Laura Stacey, and Ann-Renee Desbiens. Poulin was named team captain, with Stacey and Erin Ambrose named assistant captains.

== Standings ==
Pos	Team	Pld	W	OTW	OTL	L	GF	GA	GD	Pts	Qualification
1	Toronto (Y)	24	13	4	0	7	69	50	+19	47	Playoffs
2	Montreal (X)	24	10	3	5	6	60	57	+3	41	Playoffs
3	Boston (X)	24	8	4	3	9	50	57	−7	35 (Note: Greater number of games won, excluding games won by Shootout: Boston 11 wins, Minnesota 10 wins)	Playoffs
4	Minnesota (X)	24	8	4	3	9	54	54	0	35	Playoffs
5	Ottawa (E)	24	8	1	6	9	62	63	−1	32	
6	New York (E)	24	5	4	3	12	53	67	−14	26	

Updated to match(es) played on May 5, 2024. Source: PWHL
(E) Eliminated; (X) Clinched playoff berth; (Y) Clinched first place

== Schedule and results ==
=== Regular season ===
Montréal played its first ever game on January 2, 2024, against PWHL Ottawa at TD Place Arena. In front of what was a women's professional record crowd of 8,318, Montréal won the game in overtime by a score of 3–2 on a goal by Ann-Sophie Bettez; Claire Dalton scored the first goal in team history in the second period. Montréal hosted its first game on January 13, with PWHL Boston visiting Verdun Auditorium. In front of a sell-out crowd, Boston won 3–2 in overtime; Ambrose scored the first home goal in team history. The team hosted its first game at Place Bell on January 16, defeating visiting PWHL New York by a score of 3–2, with Poulin scoring the game-winning goal.

On February 16, 2024, Montréal played a match hosted by PWHL Toronto at Scotiabank Arena in a game dubbed "The Battle on Bay Street". The game set a league and women’s hockey attendance record with a sell-out crowd of 19,285, beating the previous record of 18,013 at the 2013 IIHF Women's World Championship. On April 20, Montréal hosted Toronto at the Bell Centre in a game dubbed the "Duel at the Top"—with the two teams vying for first place in the standings—and the sell-out crowd of 21,105 established another new attendance record.

Montréal clinched a spot in the inaugural PWHL playoffs on April 24 with a 5–2 win over New York.

=== Regular season schedule ===
The regular season schedule was published on November 30, 2023.

Regular season schedule (Home: 6–1–3–2; Road: 4–2–2–4)
January: 3–2–2–1, 15 points (Home: 1–1–2–0; Road: 2–1–0–1)

Game	Date	Opponent	Score	OT	Decision	Location	Attendance	Record	Points	Recap
1	January 2	@ Ottawa	3–2	OT	Desbiens	TD Place Arena	8,318	0–1–0–0	2	
2	January 6	@ Minnesota	0–3		Desbiens	Xcel Energy Center	13,316	0–1–0–1	2	
3	January 10	@ New York	5–2		Chuli	UBS Arena	2,201	1–1–0–1	5	
4	January 13	Boston	2–3	OT	Desbiens	Verdun Auditorium	3,245	1–1–1–1	6	
5	January 16	New York	3–2		Desbiens	Place Bell	6,334	2–1–1–1	9	
6	January 20	Toronto	3–4	SO	Desbiens	Verdun Auditorium	3,232	2–1–2–1	10	
7	January 24	@ Minnesota	2–1		Chuli	Xcel Energy Center	5,001	3–1–2–1	13	
8	January 27	Ottawa	2–1	OT	Desbiens	Place Bell	8,646	3–2–2–1	15	

February: 2–1–1–1, 9 points (Home: 2–0–0–0; Road: 0–1–1–1)

Game	Date	Opponent	Score	OT	Decision	Location	Attendance	Record	Points	Recap
9	February 4	@ Boston	2–1	OT	Chuli	Tsongas Center	4,210	3–3–2–1	17	
10	February 16	@ Toronto	0–3		Desbiens	Scotiabank Arena	19,285	3–3–2–2	17	
11	February 18	Minnesota	2–1		Chuli	Place Bell	10,172	4–3–2–2	20	
12	February 21	@ New York	2–3	SO	Desbiens	UBS Arena	2,128	4–3–3–2	21	
13	February 24	Ottawa	6–3		Desbiens	Verdun Auditorium	3,232	5–3–3–2	24	

March: 2–0–1–3, 7 points (Home: 1–0–0–2; Road: 1–0–1–1)

Game	Date	Opponent	Score	OT	Decision	Location	Attendance	Record	Points	Recap
14	March 2	Boston	3–1		Chuli	Verdun Auditorium	3,232	6–3–3–2	27	
15	March 6	@ New York	4–3		Desbiens	Total Mortgage Arena	728	7–3–3–2	30	
16	March 8	@ Toronto	0–3		Chuli	Mattamy Athletic Centre	2,554	7–3–3–3	30	
17	March 10	Ottawa	2–4		Desbiens	Place Bell	10,172	7–3–3–4	30	
18	March 17	Toronto	1–2		Desbiens	PPG Paints Arena	8,850	7–3–3–5	30	
19	March 24	@ Minnesota	2–3	SO	Chuli	Xcel Energy Center	7,268	7–3–4–5	31	

April: 3–0–1–0, 10 points (Home: 2–0–1–0; Road: 1–0–0–0)

Game	Date	Opponent	Score	OT	Decision	Location	Attendance	Record	Points	Recap
20	April 18	Minnesota	4–3		Chuli	Verdun Auditorium	3,084	8–3–4–5	34	
21	April 20	Toronto	2–3	OT	Desbiens	Bell Centre	21,105	8–3–5–5	35	
22	April 24	New York	5–2		Desbiens	Verdun Auditorium	3,232	9–3–5–5	38	
23	April 27	@ Ottawa	2–0		Desbiens	TD Place Arena	8,452	10–3–5–5	41	

May: 0–0–0–1, 0 points (Home: 0–0–0–0; Road: 0–0–0–1)

Game	Date	Opponent	Score	OT	Decision	Location	Attendance	Record	Points	Recap
24	May 4	@ Boston	3–4		Desbiens	Tsongas Center	5,964	10–3–5–6	41	

Regulation Win (3 points) Overtime/Shootout win (2 points) Overtime/shootout loss (1 point) Regulation Loss (0 points)

=== Playoffs ===
On May 6, 2024, PWHL Toronto, who finished first overall, elected to play PWHL Minnesota in the first round of the playoffs. Therefore, the Montréal drew a semifinal match-up against PWHL Boston

Boston upset Montréal, winning the series in three straight games. All three games were decided in overtime, including two games in Montréal. In the second game, which was settled in the third overtime period, Boston goaltender Aerin Frankel set a playoff record with a 56-save performance. The series loss knocked Montréal out of contention for the Walter Cup as Boston moved on to the finals.

2024 PWHL Playoffs
First round vs. PWHL Boston: Boston won 3–0

Game	Date	Opponent	Score	OT	Decision	Location	Attendance	Series	Recap
1	May 9	Boston	1–2	OT	Desbiens	Place Bell	9,135	0–1	
2	May 11	Boston	1–2	3OT	Desbiens	Place Bell	10,172	0–2	
3	May 14	@ Boston	2–3	OT	Desbiens	Tsongas Center	2,781	0–3	

== Player statistics ==
As of May 4, 2024

= Indicates team leader

=== Skaters ===
Regular season
Player	GP	G	A	Pts	SOG	+/−	PIM
Marie-Philip Poulin	21	10	13	23	69	+8	14
Laura Stacey	23	10	8	18	96	+4	2
Erin Ambrose	24	4	14	18	47	+5	4
Maureen Murphy	24	5	11	16	57	+3	4
Claire Dalton	20	5	4	9	22	+3	0
Kristin O'Neill	23	4	5	9	44	–1	8
Catherine Dubois	21	2	4	6	22	–4	12
Gabrielle David	23	2	4	6	20	+4	4
Kati Tabin	24	1	5	6	50	+6	14
Mélodie Daoust	6	3	2	5	13	+6	4
Ann-Sophie Bettez	15	2	3	5	17	–2	2
Sarah Lefort	24	1	4	5	32	0	10
Sarah Bujold	21	3	1	4	25	–6	18
Leah Lum	23	1	3	4	11	–2	6
Jillian Dempsey	24	1	3	4	14	+1	2
Amanda Boulier	6	0	3	3	11	–3	0
Mariah Keopple	24	0	3	3	21	+2	12
Mikyla Grant-Mentis	7	2	0	2	9	0	4
Kennedy Marchment	9	1	1	2	11	0	0
Catherine Daoust	24	1	1	2	16	–2	12
Madison Bizal	21	0	2	2	10	+1	4
Brigitte Laganière	17	0	1	1	5	+1	0
Dominika Lásková	7	0	0	0	6	0	8
Alexandra Poznikoff	8	0	0	0	6	0	0

Playoffs
Player	GP	G	A	Pts	SOG	+/−	PIM
Maureen Murphy	3	1	2	3	11	–3	2
Kristin O'Neill	3	2	0	2	11	–2	0
Marie-Philip Poulin	3	1	1	2	18	–2	0
Erin Ambrose	3	0	2	2	10	–2	0
Madison Bizal	3	0	1	1	1	0	0
Mikyla Grant-Mentis	3	0	1	1	13	–1	0
Laura Stacey	3	0	1	1	17	–2	0
Alexandra Poznikoff	1	0	0	0	0	0	0
Sarah Lefort	2	0	0	0	7	0	0
Amanda Boulier	3	0	0	0	5	–2	2
Claire Dalton	3	0	0	0	8	–1	0
Catherine Daoust	3	0	0	0	1	–3	0
Mélodie Daoust	3	0	0	0	12	–4	2
Gabrielle David	3	0	0	0	3	–1	0
Jillian Dempsey	3	0	0	0	1	–1	0
Catherine Dubois	3	0	0	0	2	–2	2
Mariah Keopple	3	0	0	0	3	–2	0
Brigitte Laganière	3	0	0	0	0	–1	0
Leah Lum	3	0	0	0	1	0	0
Kati Tabin	3	0	0	0	21	–1	0

=== Goaltenders ===
Regular season
Player	GP	TOI	W	L	OT	GA	GAA	SA	SV%	SO	G	A	PIM
Ann-Renée Desbiens	16	975:33	7	5	2	37	2.28	478	0.923	1	0	0	2
Elaine Chuli	8	483:41	6	1	0	13	1.61	253	0.949	0	0	0	0

Playoffs
Player	GP	TOI	W	L	OT	GA	GAA	SA	SV%	SO	G	A	PIM
Ann-Renée Desbiens	3	247:11	0	0	3	7	1.70	102	0.931	0	0	0	0

== Awards and honours ==
=== Milestones ===
Regular season
Player	Milestone	Reached
Claire Dalton	1st goal in franchise history	January 2, 2024
Claire Dalton	1st career PWHL goal	January 2, 2024
Claire Dalton	1st career PWHL game	January 2, 2024
Laura Stacey	1st career PWHL goal	January 2, 2024
Laura Stacey	1st career PWHL game	January 2, 2024
Ann-Sophie Bettez	1st career PWHL goal	January 2, 2024
Ann-Sophie Bettez	1st career PWHL overtime goal	January 2, 2024
Ann-Sophie Bettez	1st career PWHL game	January 2, 2024
Jillian Dempsey	1st assist in franchise history	January 2, 2024
Jillian Dempsey	1st career PWHL assist	January 2, 2024
Jillian Dempsey	1st career PWHL game	January 2, 2024
Kennedy Marchment	1st career PWHL assist	January 2, 2024
Kennedy Marchment	1st career PWHL game	January 2, 2024
Tereza Vanišová	1st career PWHL assist	January 2, 2024
Tereza Vanišová	1st career PWHL game	January 2, 2024
Marie-Philip Poulin	1st career PWHL assist	January 2, 2024
Marie-Philip Poulin	1st career PWHL game	January 2, 2024
Kati Tabin	1st career PWHL assist	January 2, 2024
Kati Tabin	1st career PWHL game	January 2, 2024
Kristin O'Neill	1st career PWHL assist	January 2, 2024
Kristin O'Neill	1st career PWHL game	January 2, 2024
Mariah Keopple	1st career PWHL game	January 2, 2024
Catherine Daoust	1st career PWHL game	January 2, 2024
Gabrielle David	1st career PWHL game	January 2, 2024
Brigitte Laganière	1st career PWHL game	January 2, 2024
Leah Lum	1st career PWHL game	January 2, 2024
Maureen Murphy	1st career PWHL game	January 2, 2024
Sarah Lefort	1st career PWHL game	January 2, 2024
Erin Ambrose	1st career PWHL game	January 2, 2024
Sarah Bujold	1st career PWHL game	January 2, 2024
Dominika Lásková	1st career PWHL game	January 2, 2024
Ann-Renée Desbiens	1st win in franchise history	January 2, 2024
Ann-Renée Desbiens	1st career PWHL win	January 2, 2024
Ann-Renée Desbiens	1st career PWHL game	January 2, 2024
Ann-Renée Desbiens	1st loss in franchise history	January 6, 2024
Ann-Renée Desbiens	1st career PWHL loss	January 6, 2024
Marie-Philip Poulin	1st career PWHL goal	January 10, 2024
Marie-Philip Poulin	1st career PWHL hat-trick	January 10, 2024
Catherine Dubois	1st career PWHL goal	January 10, 2024
Kennedy Marchment	1st career PWHL goal	January 10, 2024
Erin Ambrose	1st career PWHL assist	January 10, 2024
Maureen Murphy	1st career PWHL assist	January 10, 2024
Gabrielle David	1st career PWHL assist	January 10, 2024
Elaine Chuli	1st career PWHL win	January 10, 2024
Elaine Chuli	1st career PWHL game	January 10, 2024
Erin Ambrose	1st career PWHL goal	January 13, 2024
Ann-Sophie Bettez	1st career PWHL assist	January 13, 2024
Ann-Renée Desbiens	1st career overtime loss	January 13, 2024
Gabrielle David	1st career PWHL goal	January 16, 2024
Leah Lum	1st career PWHL goal	January 16, 2024
Tereza Vanišová	5th career PWHL assist	January 16, 2024
Maureen Murphy	5th career PWHL assist	January 16, 2024
Sarah Bujold	1st career PWHL goal	January 20, 2024
Marie-Philip Poulin	5th career PWHL goal	January 20, 2024
Leah Lum	1st career PWHL assist	January 20, 2024
Claire Dalton	1st career PWHL assist	January 20, 2024
Ann-Renée Desbiens	1st career shootout loss	January 20, 2024
Alina Müller	1st career PWHL goal	January 24, 2024
Alina Müller	1st career PWHL power play goal	January 24, 2024
Jamie Lee Rattray	1st career PWHL goal	January 24, 2024
Megan Keller	1st career PWHL goal	January 24, 2024
Maureen Murphy	1st career PWHL goal	January 27, 2024
Laura Stacey	5th career PWHL goal	February 4, 2024
Sarah Lefort	1st career PWHL goal	February 18, 2024
Madison Bizal	1st career PWHL assist	February 18, 2024
Catherine Dubois	1st career PWHL goal	February 21, 2024
Claire Dalton	1st career PWHL hat-trick	February 24, 2024
Claire Dalton	5th career PWHL goal	February 24, 2024
Erin Ambrose	5th career PWHL assist	February 24, 2024
Marie-Philip Poulin	5th career PWHL assist	February 24, 2024
Laura Stacey	1st career PWHL assist	February 24, 2024
Sarah Bujold	1st career PWHL assist	February 24, 2024
Melodie Daoust	1st career PWHL goal	March 2, 2024
Melodie Daoust	1st career PWHL game	March 2, 2024
Mariah Keopple	1st career PWHL assist	March 2, 2024
Jillian Dempsey	1st career PWHL goal	March 6, 2024
Kati Tabin	4th career PWHL assist	March 10, 2024
Kristin O'Neill	1st career PWHL goal	March 17, 2024
Kati Tabin	1st career PWHL goal	March 24, 2024
Marie-Philip Poulin	10th career PWHL assist	April 18, 2024
Erin Ambrose	10th career PWHL assist	April 18, 2024
Laura Stacey	5th career PWHL assist	April 18, 2024
Maureen Murphy	10th career PWHL assist	April 20, 2024
Catherine Daoust	1st career PWHL goal	April 24, 2024
Kristin O'Neill	5th career PWHL assist	April 24, 2024
Laura Stacey	10th career PWHL goal	April 27, 2024
Maureen Murphy	5th career PWHL goal	April 27, 2024
Mélodie Daoust	1st career PWHL assist	April 27, 2024
Ann-Renée Desbiens	1st career PWHL shutout	April 27, 2024
Marie-Philip Poulin	10th career PWHL goal	May 4, 2024
Mikyla Grant-Mentis	1st career PWHL goal	May 4, 2024
Mikyla Grant-Mentis	1st career power-play goal	May 4, 2024

=== Awards ===
Award winners
Award	Recipient	Ref.
Defender of the Year	Erin Ambrose	

== Transactions ==
=== Signings ===
Date	Player	Position	Term	Previous Team	Ref
September 7, 2023	Ann-Renée Desbiens	G	3 years	Team Harvey's	
September 7, 2023	Marie-Philip Poulin	F	3 years	Team Harvey's	
September 7, 2023	Laura Stacey	F	3 years	Team Adidas	
October 30, 2023	Kristin O'Neill	F	3 years	Team Adidas	
November 7, 2023	Kennedy Marchment	F	2 years	Connecticut Whale	
November 9, 2023	Jillian Dempsey	F	1 year	Boston Pride	
November 13, 2023	Erin Ambrose	D	3 years	Team Sonnet	
November 14, 2023	Claire Dalton	F	1 year	Yale	
November 15, 2023	Ann-Sophie Bettez	F	1 year	Montreal Force	
November 15, 2023	Sarah Bujold	F	1 year	Metropolitan Riveters	
November 20, 2023	Elaine Chuli	G	1 year	Toronto Six	
November 20, 2023	Kati Tabin	D	2 years	Toronto Six	
November 21, 2023	Dominika Lásková	D	2 years	Toronto Six	
November 21, 2023	Mariah Keopple	D	1 year	Princeton	
November 29, 2023	Maureen Murphy	F	3 years	Northeastern	
December 11, 2023	Tereza Vanišová	F	2 years	Toronto Six	
December 11, 2023	Gabrielle David	F	1 year	Clarkson	

== Draft picks ==
Below are the PWHL Montreal's selections at the 2023 PWHL draft held on September 18, 2023.

Round	Pick	Player	Nationality	Position	Previous team
1	6	Erin Ambrose	Canada	Defence	Team Sonnet (PWHPA)
2	7	Kristin O'Neill	Canada	Forward	Team Adidas (PWHPA)
3	18	Maureen Murphy	United States	Forward	Northeastern (Hockey East)
4	19	Dominika Lásková	Czech Republic	Defence	Toronto Six (PHF)
5	30	Kati Tabin	Canada	Defence	Toronto Six (PHF)
6	31	Kennedy Marchment	Canada	Forward	Connecticut Whale (PHF)
7	42	Tereza Vanisova	Czech Republic	Forward	Toronto Six (PHF)
8	43	Madison Bizal	United States	Defence	Ohio State (WCHA)
9	54	Gabrielle David	Canada	Forward	Clarkson (ECAC)
10	55	Maude Poulin-Labelle	Canada	Defence	Northeastern (Hockey East)
11	66	Jillian Dempsey	United States	Forward	Boston Pride (PHF)
12	67	Claire Dalton	Canada	Forward	Yale (ECAC)
13	78	Elaine Chuli	Canada	Goaltender	Toronto Six (PHF)
14	79	Ann-Sophie Bettez	Canada	Forward	Montreal Force (PHF)
15	90	Lina Ljungblom	Sweden	Forward	MoDo Hockey (SDHL)
