= Montreal Dragons =

Defunct basketball team in Canada

- League: National Basketball League
- Founded: 1993
- Folded: June 10, 1993
- History: Montreal Dragons (1993)
- Arena: Verdun Auditorium
- Capacity: 4,114
- Location: Montreal, Quebec
- President: François Tremblay
- General manager: François Tremblay
- Head coach: Eric Dennis
- Championships: 0
- Conference titles: 0

The Montreal Dragons were a professional Canadian basketball team based in Montreal, Quebec. They competed in the now defunct National Basketball League in 1993.

The team did not complete their first season and disbanded on June 10, 1993. During their first and only season, the Dragons won 11 games and lost 6 games.

The Montreal Dragons was coached by Eric Dennis and the roster included notable players Reggie Cross, George Ackles, Dwight Walton, and Wayne Yearwood. The team's home court was the Verdun Auditorium. Since the disbandment of the Dragons, there have been 7 other short-lived professional teams in Montreal. The Montreal Alliance currently competes in the Canadian Elite Basketball League (CEBL).

== Season record ==
Season	GP	W	L	Pct.	GBL	Finish	Playoffs
1993	17	11	6	.647	–	N/A	Team Folded June 10, 1993
