= Samantha Isbell =

Canadian ice hockey player (born 1998)

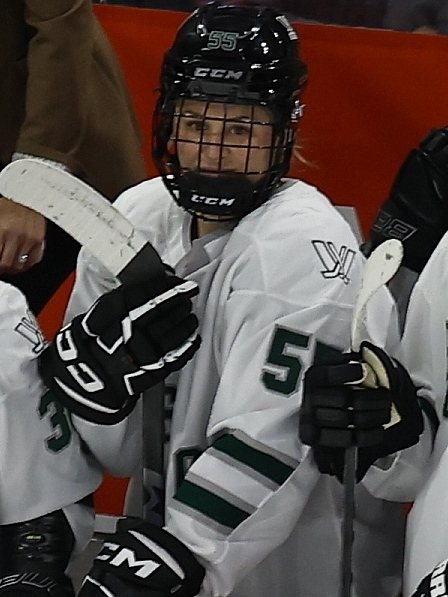
- Isbell with PWHL Boston in 2024
- Born: February 17, 1998 (age 28) Thunder Bay, Ontario, Canada
- Height: 5 ft 7 in (170 cm)
- Position: Forward
- Shoots: Left Wing/Defense
- PWHL team Former teams: Montréal Victoire; Ottawa Charge; PWHL Boston; Montreal Force; PWHPA Montreal
- Playing career: 2020–present

Samantha Isbell (born February 17, 1998) is a Canadian professional ice hockey forward for the Montréal Victoire of the Professional Women's Hockey League (PWHL). She previously played for the Ottawa Charge of the PWHL, the Montreal Force of the Premier Hockey Federation (PHF) and in the Professional Women's Hockey Players Association (PWHPA). She played college ice hockey at Mercyhurst University.

== Playing career ==
=== Early career ===
Isbell is the daughter of Rob and Ruthann Isbell and sister to siblings, Sydney and Bryce. Her sister Sydney was a goaltender at Chatham University. Her grandfather is Bill Isbell, a former ice hockey player for the North Bay Trappers, the junior team for the Montreal Canadiens, in 1961-1962.

She grew up playing minor ice hockey with the Thunder Bay Queens. She won silver at the Ontario Women's Hockey Association provincial championship in 2013. She was named co-captain of the Queens for the 2014–15 season.

She played one season with the Whitby Wolves of the Ontario Women's Hockey League for the 2015-16 season.

As a grade 11 student, she was an honour roll student at Westgate High School. She committed to Mercyhurst College on a scholarship for the 2016-17 season.

=== College ===
Isbell played four seasons of Division I college ice hockey with the Mercyhurst Lakers in the NCAA. She scored her first NCAA goal against the North Dakota Fighting Hawks.

In her sophomore year of the 2018–19 season, she had three multi-point games. On January 6, 2019, she had a career high 5-point game against the Colgate Raiders.

During her senior year, Isbell played defense. She finished the season with a new career high of 31 points, 6 goals and 25 assists, in 35 games and was named to the CHA All-Conference Second Team. The Lakers would finish the season first in the CHA Tournament but would not appear in the 2020 Frozen Four Tournament as it was cancelled due to the COVID-19 pandemic.

=== Professional ===
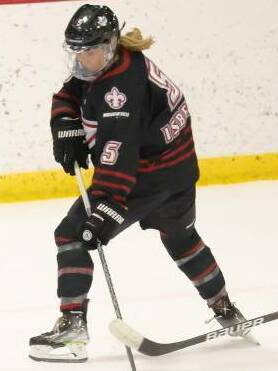
Isbell with the Montreal Force in 2022

Isbell began her professional career in the 2020-21 pandemic season with the regional Montreal team, Team Bauer, of the PWHPA. She continued to play defense in her first season with Montreal.

She remained with Montreal, now Team Harvey's, for the 2021–22 season but was moved back to the forward position.

With the expansion of the PHF to Montreal, the Montreal Force announced they had signed Isbell to a contract on August 10, 2022 for the 2022–23 season. In the opening game of the season against the Buffalo Beauts on November 5, 2022, Isbell scored the game winning goal in the eight round of the shootout, beating Lovisa Berndtsson for the first regulation win in the Force's history. She finished the season with 12 points (3G, 9A) in 22 games.

In May 2023, she re-signed with the Force for $75,000, but her contract was voided after the PHF was purchased by the Mark Walter Group.

With the formation of the PWHL, Isbell declared for the inaugural 2023 draft but was undrafted. However, she was invited to the PWHL Boston training camp and made the final roster as a reserve player for the 2023–24 season. She was activated from reserve on February 16, 2024 and signed a 10-day Standard Player Agreement (SPA), playing three games for Boston. While on the reserve roster, Isbell then signed a one-year SPA with the Ottawa on March 5, 2024. She made seven appearances with Ottawa for the remainder of the season primarily playing on defense, as injuries left the team with only six healthy defense players.

For the 2024–25 season, Isbell attended the Charge training camp and subsequently signed a Reserve Player contract with the team. She signed two 10-day SPAs and was activated to the active roster and played four regular season games but remained scoreless. Before the Charge's first playoff game in history, she signed a SPA when defender Jincy Roese was placed on LTIR and played four playoff games.

On July 10, 2025, she signed a one-year contract extension with the Charge. Isbell was released from this contract when the Charge signed forward Olivia Wallin to a contract on January 30, 2026. She began skating with the Concordia Stingers while waiting for another opportunity. She signed a Reserve Player contract with the Victoire on March 24, 2026 joining them during the 2025–26 season as the team was facing injury concerns.

== Personal life ==
Isbell is from Thunder Bay, Ontario. She grew up looking up to fellow Thunder Bay native Haley Irwin, a three-time Olympic medalist with Team Canada.

Isbell graduated from Mercyhurst with a Bachelor of Science degree in Biology with honors. She's also certified as a personal trainer.

Isbell downloaded TikTok during the COVID-19 pandemic as a creative outlet and has gained over 30,000 followers. She shares many aspects of her life: "fashion, LGBTQ+ content, some home content with my dogs."

Isbell previously dated Jill Saulnier.

== Career statistics ==
			Regular season					Playoffs
Season	Team	League	GP	G	A	Pts	PIM	GP	G	A	Pts	PIM
2016–17	Mercyhurst University	AHA	35	7	9	17	12	—	—	—	—	—
2017–18	Mercyhurst University	AHA	37	6	10	16	16	—	—	—	—	—
2018–19	Mercyhurst University	AHA	34	7	11	18	26	—	—	—	—	—
2019–20	Mercyhurst University	AHA	35	6	26	31	42	—	—	—	—	—
2020–21	Team Bauer	PWHPA	4	0	1	1	0	—	—	—	—	—
2021–22	Team Harvey's	PWHPA	5	0	0	0	2	—	—	—	—	—
2022–23	Montreal Force	PHF	22	3	9	12	12	—	—	—	—	—
2023–24	PWHL Boston	PWHL	3	0	0	0	0	—	—	—	—	—
2023–24	PWHL Ottawa	PWHL	7	0	0	0	0	—	—	—	—	—
2024–25	Ottawa Charge	PWHL	4	0	0	0	2	4	0	0	0	0
2025–26	Ottawa Charge	PWHL	8	0	1	1	0	—	—	—	—	—
2025–26	Montréal Victoire	PWHL	—	—	—	—	—	—	—	—	—	—
PWHL totals			22	0	1	1	2	4	0	0	0	0
