= Abby Cook (ice hockey) =

Canadian ice hockey player (born 1998)

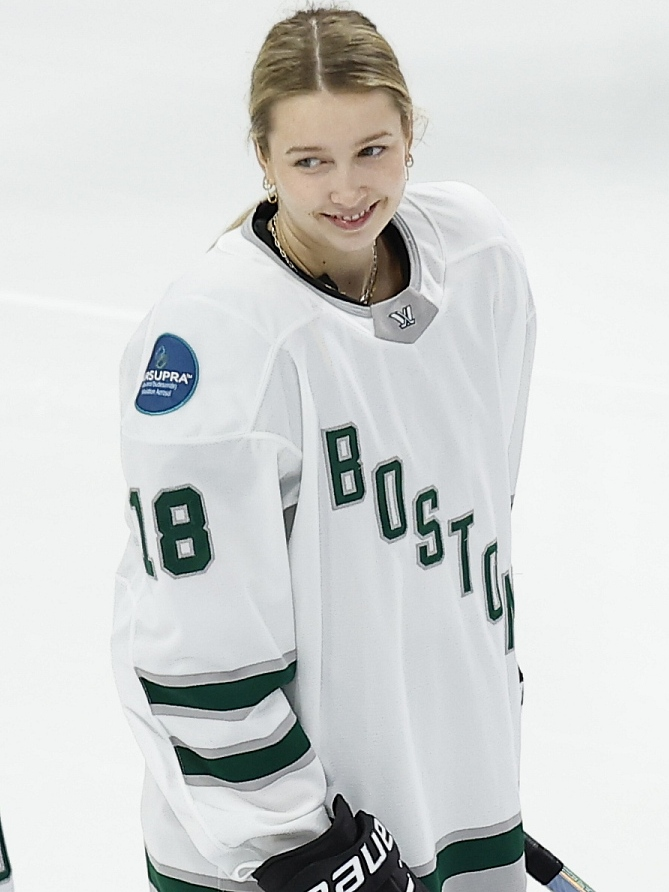
- Cook with PWHL Boston in 2024
- Born: May 12, 1998 (age 28) Kelowna, British Columbia, Canada
- Height: 5 ft 10 in (178 cm)
- Position: Defence
- Shot: Right
- Played for: PWHL Boston; PWHL Minnesota; Boston Pride; Djurgårdens IF
- Playing career: 2016–2024

Abby Cook (born May 12, 1998) is a Canadian former professional ice hockey defenceman who most recently played for PWHL Boston of the Professional Women's Hockey League (PWHL). She previously played for PWHL Minnesota, the Boston Pride of the Premier Hockey Federation (PHF) and Djurgårdens IF of the Swedish Women's Hockey League (SDHL). She played college ice hockey at Boston University.

== Early life ==
Cook played four years with the Pursuit of Excellence hockey team. During the 2015–16 season, she recorded three goals and 11 assists to lead her team in scoring among defenceman.

== College career ==
Cook began her collegiate career at Boston University during the 2016–17 season. During her freshman year, she appeared in all 37 games and recorded four goals and 11 assists. She led all Hockey East freshmen with a +18 plus–minus and was named to the All-Hockey East Rookie Team. During the 2017–18 season, in her sophomore year, she recorded two goals and 24 assists in 37 games and was named to the All-Hockey East First Team. She was also a runner up for the Hockey East Best Defenseman award.

During the 2018–19 season, in her junior year, she recorded three goals and 12 assists in 37 games and was named to the All-Hockey East Second Team. During the 2019–20 season, in her senior year, she recorded ten goals and 20 assists in 36 games, and was again named to the All-Hockey East First Team. She led Hockey East defencemen in goals (6), assists (14) and power play points (20), and led all NCAA defenceman with five game-winning goals. She was named a three-time New England Division I All-Star, joining Marie-Philip Poulin as the only players in program history to receive the award three times. She finished her collegiate career with 24 goals and 75 assists in 147 games. Her 99 points are the most by a defenceman in program history.

== Professional career ==
Following her collegiate career, Cook joined Djurgårdens IF of the SDHL. During the 2020–21 season, in her first professional season, she recorded one goal and four assists in 36 regular season games, and one assist in six playoff games. She then joined the Boston Pride of the PHF during the 2021–22 season and recorded one assist in six playoff games.

On June 6, 2023, Cook signed a one-year contract with the Metropolitan Riveters of the PHF. The PHF ceased operations on June 29, 2023, as a result she never played a game for the Riveters. In December 2023, she signed a one-year contract with PWHL Minnesota. On February 11, 2024, Cook was traded to PWHL Boston, along with Susanna Tapani, in exchange for Sophie Jaques in the PWHL's inaugural trade. Prior to being traded, she recorded one goal in nine games with Minnesota. She finished the season with one goal in nine games for Boston.

In October 2024, Cook announced her retirement.

== Personal life ==
Cook was born to Sharon and Ross Cook, and has a brother, Mitch. Her brother played ice hockey at the University of Calgary.

== Career statistics ==
Note: GP = Games played; G = Goals; A = Assists; Pts = Points; PIM = Penalty minutes;

| | | | Regular season | | | | | Playoffs |
| Season | Team | League | GP | G | A | Pts | PIM | GP | G | A | Pts | PIM |
|---|---|---|---|---|---|---|---|---|---|---|---|---|
| 2016–17 | Boston University | HE | 37 | 4 | 11 | 15 | 30 | — | — | — | — | — |
| 2017–18 | Boston University | HE | 37 | 2 | 24 | 26 | 18 | — | — | — | — | — |
| 2018–19 | Boston University | HE | 37 | 8 | 20 | 28 | 18 | — | — | — | — | — |
| 2019–20 | Boston University | HE | 34 | 10 | 20 | 30 | 24 | — | — | — | — | — |
| 2020–21 | Djurgårdens IF | SDHL | 36 | 1 | 4 | 5 | 26 | 6 | 0 | 1 | 1 | 2 |
| 2021–22 | Boston Pride | PHF | 6 | 0 | 1 | 1 | 2 | — | — | — | — | — |
| 2023–24 | PWHL Minnesota | PWHL | 9 | 1 | 0 | 1 | 6 | — | — | — | — | — |
| 2023–24 | PWHL Boston | PWHL | 9 | 1 | 0 | 1 | 2 | 2 | 0 | 0 | 0 | 0 |
| SDHL totals | | | 36 | 1 | 4 | 5 | 26 | 6 | 0 | 1 | 1 | 2 |
| PHF totals | | | 6 | 0 | 1 | 1 | 2 | — | — | — | — | — |
| PWHL totals | | | 18 | 2 | 0 | 2 | 8 | 2 | 0 | 0 | 0 | 0 |

== Awards and honours ==
| Honors | Year |
College
| All-Hockey East Rookie Team | 2017 |
| All-Hockey East First Team | 2018 |
| All-Hockey East Second Team | 2019 |
| All-Hockey East First Team | 2020 |
