= Sophie Jaques =

Canadian ice hockey player (born 2000)

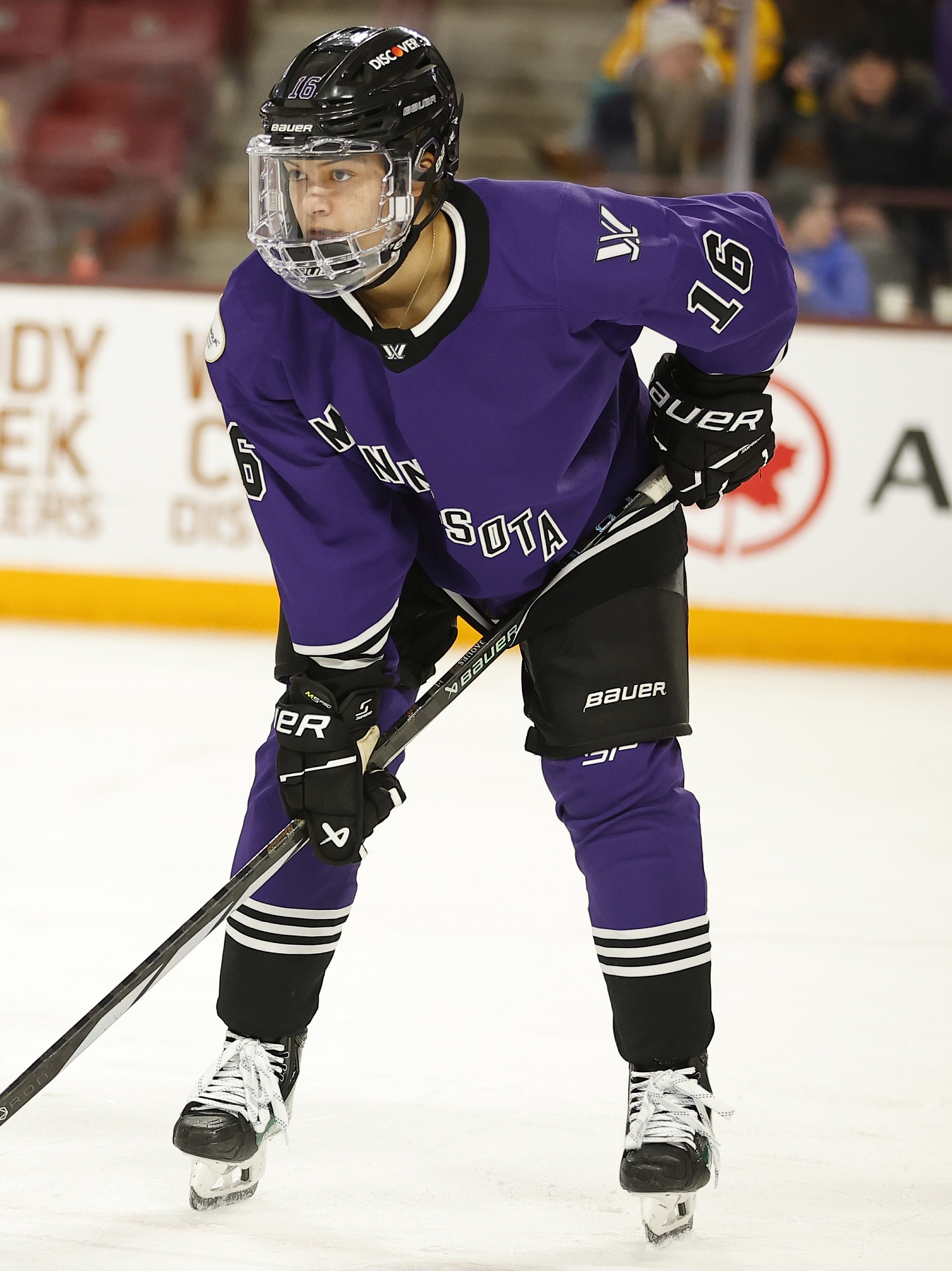
- Jaques with PWHL Minnesota in 2024
- Born: October 16, 2000 (age 26) Toronto, Ontario, Canada
- Height: 5 ft 8 in (173 cm)
- Position: Defence
- Shoots: Right
- PWHL team Former teams: Vancouver Goldeneyes; Minnesota Frost; PWHL Boston
- National team: Canada
- Playing career: 2018–present
Medal record
Olympic Games
Silver medal – second place	2026 Milano Cortina	Team
World Championships
Silver medal – second place	2025 Czechia
Silver medal – second place	2026 Denmark

Sophie Jaques (born October 16, 2000) is a Canadian professional ice hockey defender for the Vancouver Goldeneyes of the Professional Women's Hockey League (PWHL). She previously played for the Minnesota Frost, where she won two Walter Cups. She was selected tenth overall by PWHL Boston in the 2023 PWHL Draft. Jaques played college ice hockey at Ohio State and won the Patty Kazmaier Award in 2023. She has played for the Canadian women's national ice hockey team since 2025 and won a silver medal at the 2026 Winter Olympics.

== Early life ==
Jaques played ice hockey for the Toronto Jr. Aeros of the Provincial Women's Hockey League for three seasons, where she recorded 20 goals and 25 assists in 78 games. She helped lead the Aeros to the PWHL Championship and Provincial Cup in 2016 and 2018.

== Playing career ==
=== College ===
Jaques began her collegiate career with the Ohio State Buckeyes during the 2018–19 season. During her freshman year, she recorded five goals and 16 assists in 35 games. She led all Buckeyes rookies in goals, assists and points, and ranked sixth overall on the team during the season.

During the 2019–20 season in her sophomore year, she recorded nine goals and 15 assists in 38 games. She ranked third in the conference for defenceman scoring, led all defenceman with 131 shots on goal, and ranked second on the team with 58 blocked shots. Following the season she was named to the All-WCHA Third Team. During the 2020–21 season in her junior year, she recorded two goals and two assists in a season that was shortened due to the COVID-19 pandemic. She led all WCHA defenceman with 54 shots on goal and led the team with 33 blocked shots.

During the 2021–22 season in her senior year, she recorded 21 goals and 38 assists in 38 games. She set the Ohio State single season record for points by a defenceman with 59, and matched the program single-season points record for any player. Her 59 points were the second-most single season points by a true defenceman in NCAA Division I history. During the WCHA Final Faceoff Championship game, Jaques scored the game-tying game-winning goals in the Buckeyes' overtime win against Minnesota. She was subsequently named the WCHA Final Faceoff Most Outstanding Player. She also helped lead the Buckeyes to their first NCAA women's ice hockey tournament championship in 2022. Following an outstanding season she was named to the All-WCHA First Team, and WCHA Defensive Player of the Year. She was also named a CCM/AHCA Hockey First Team All-American and, the third Buckeye to earn the first team honor. She was named a top-three finalist for the Patty Kazmaier Award, becoming the first Buckeye to be named one of the final three candidates for the award. She was also named the Ohio State University Female Athlete of the Year.

During the 2022–23 season, as a graduate student, she recorded 24 goals and 24 assists in 39 games. On February 24, 2023, she recorded her first career hat-trick in a game against Bemidji State. Following an outstanding season she was named to the All-WCHA First Team, the WCHA Player of the Year, and WCHA Defensive Player of the Year for the second consecutive year. She was also named a CCM/AHCA Hockey First Team All-American and won the Patty Kazmaier Award. She became the first Buckeyes player to win the award, and the second defenceman after Angela Ruggiero in 2004. Jaques ranks second in league history in career points with 154, and with 59 goals, she is one goal away from tying the WCHA record for career goals by a defenceman.

=== Professional ===
On September 18, 2023, Jaques was drafted in the second round, tenth overall, by PWHL Boston in the 2023 PWHL Draft. She became the first Ohio State player drafted to the Professional Women's Hockey League (PWHL). On October 27, 2023, she signed with Boston. On February 11, 2024, Jaques was traded to PWHL Minnesota in exchange for Abby Cook and Susanna Tapani. This was the PWHL's inaugural trade. Prior to being traded she appeared in seven games for Boston. During the 2023–24 season, she recorded two goals and eight assists in 15 regular season games and two goals and three assists in ten playoffs games to help Minnesota win the inaugural Walter Cup.

On December 19, 2024, in a game against the Ottawa Charge, Jaques suffered a shoulder injury following a hit by Mannon McMahon. She was placed on the long term injured reserve list on December 22, 2024. Prior to her injury, she recorded three assists in four games for the Frost. During the 2024–25 season, she recorded seven goals and 15 assists in 25 games and tied for the lead in scoring among defenders with 22 points. During the 2025 PWHL playoffs she recorded two goals and five assists in eight games, and tied for second among all skaters with seven points, to help the Frost win their second consecutive Walter Cup. Following the season she was named a finalist for the PWHL Defender of the Year and was selected to the first all-star team.

During the league's expansion to eight teams ahead of the 2025–26 season, Jaques was left unprotected by the Frost and signed a three-year contract with the Vancouver Goldeneyes on June 4, 2025.

== International play ==
On January 9, 2026, Jaques was named to Canada's roster to compete at the 2026 Winter Olympics. On February 7, 2026, she was one of six Canadian skaters making their Olympic debut as Canada played Switzerland. She finished the tournament with three assists in seven games and won a silver medal.

== Career statistics ==
=== Regular season and playoffs ===
Note: GP = Games played; G = Goals; A = Assists; Pts = Points; PIM = Penalty minutes;

			Regular season					Playoffs
Season	Team	League	GP	G	A	Pts	PIM	GP	G	A	Pts	PIM
2015–16	Toronto Jr. Aeros	Prov. WHL	5	0	0	0	0	—	—	—	—	—
2016–17	Toronto Jr. Aeros	Prov. WHL	38	6	14	20	18	6	0	3	3	4
2017–18	Toronto Jr. Aeros	Prov. WHL	35	14	11	25	20	12	2	2	4	6
2018–19	Ohio State University	WCHA	35	5	16	21	12	—	—	—	—	—
2019–20	Ohio State University	WCHA	38	9	15	24	10	—	—	—	—	—
2020–21	Ohio State University	WCHA	20	2	2	4	4	—	—	—	—	—
2021–22	Ohio State University	WCHA	38	21	38	59	10	—	—	—	—	—
2022–23	Ohio State University	WCHA	41	24	24	48	14	—	—	—	—	—
2023–24	PWHL Boston	PWHL	7	0	0	0	0	—	—	—	—	—
2023–24	PWHL Minnesota	PWHL	15	2	8	10	4	10	2	3	5	2
2024–25	Minnesota Frost	PWHL	25	7	15	22	10	8	2	5	7	0
2025–26	Vancouver Goldeneyes	PWHL	30	9	11	20	8	—	—	—	—	—
PWHL totals			77	18	34	52	22	18	4	8	12	2

=== International ===
Year	Team	Event	Result	GP	G	A	Pts	PIM
2025	Canada	WC	2nd place, silver medalist(s)	6	2	0	2	0
2026	Canada	OG	2nd place, silver medalist(s)	7	0	3	3	0
Senior totals				13	2	3	5	0

== Awards and honours ==
Honors	Year
College
All-WCHA Third Team	2020
WCHA Defensive Player of the Year	2022
All-WCHA First Team	2022
CCM/AHCA Hockey First Team All-American	2022
NCAA All-Tournament Team	2022
WCHA Defensive Player of the Year	2023
WCHA Player of the Year	2023
All-WCHA First Team	2023
CCM/AHCA Hockey First Team All-American	2023
Patty Kazmaier Award	2023
NCAA All-Tournament Team	2023
PWHL
Walter Cup Champion	2024, 2025
All-Rookie Team	2024
First All-Star Team	2025, 2026

Awards and achievements
Preceded by Taylor Heise	Patty Kazmaier Award; 2022–23	Succeeded by Izzy Daniel
