= Verdun Auditorium =

Arena in Montreal, Quebec, Canada

- Auditorium de Verdun
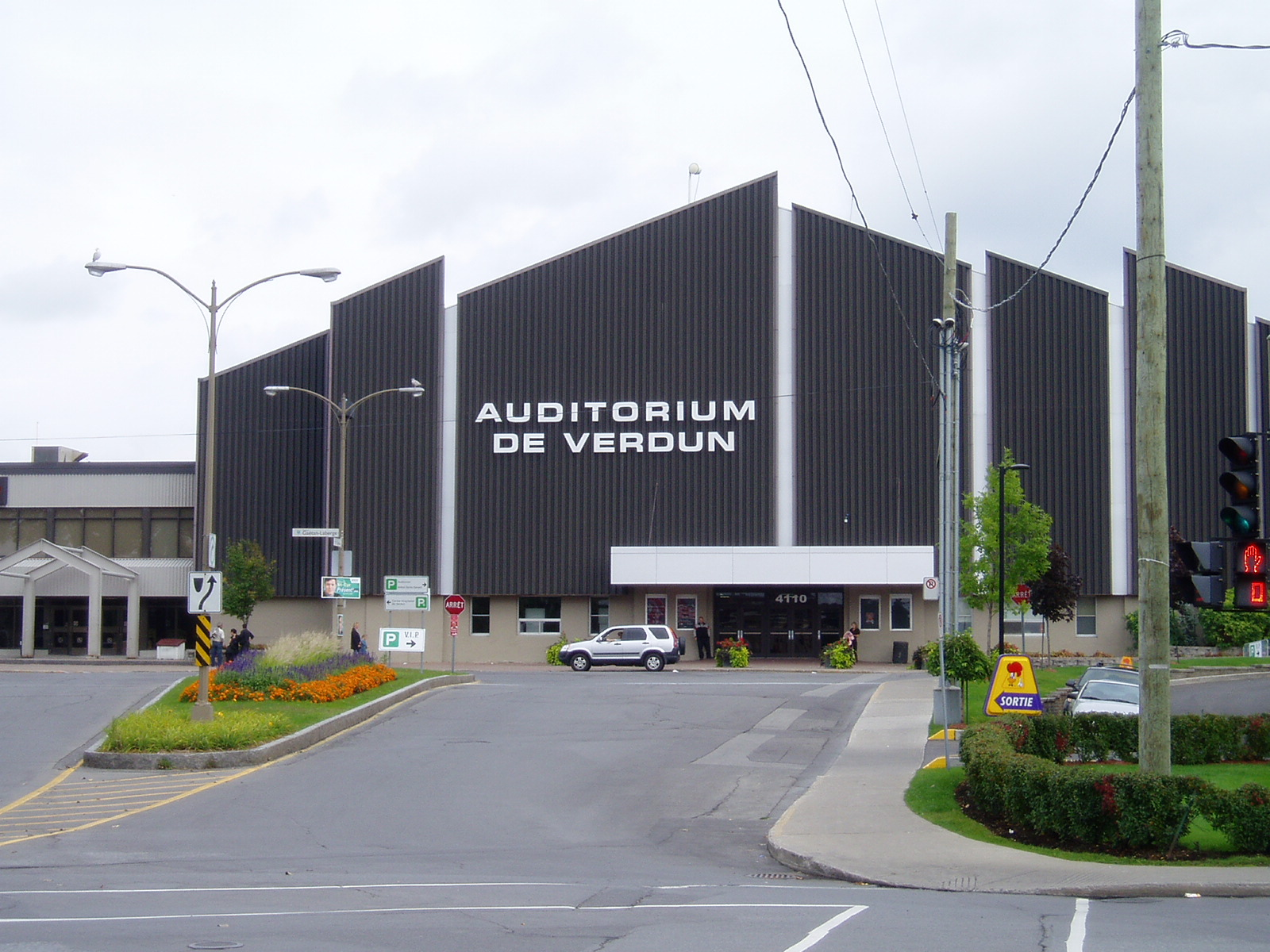
- Verdun Auditorium in 2008
- Interactive map of Verdun Auditorium
- Address: 4110, boulevard LaSalle; Montreal, Quebec; H4G 2A5
- Coordinates: 45.462448°N 73.561878°W
- Owner: City of Montreal
- Capacity: Hockey: 3,795 seated (4,114 total)
- Public transit: De l'Église

Construction
- Opened: November 28, 1939

Tenants
- Montreal Alliance (CEBL) 2022–present Montréal Victoire (PWHL) 2024; Montreal Force (PHF) 2022–2023; Montreal Junior Hockey Club (QMJHL) 2008–2011; Verdun Dragons (LNAH) 2001–2006; Montreal Dragons (NBL) 1993; Verdun Collège Français (QMJHL) 1991–1994; Verdun Juniors (QMJHL) 1982–1984; Verdun Éperviers (QMJHL) 1977–1981; Verdun Maple Leafs (QMJHL) 1920s–1972

Verdun Auditorium (French: Auditorium de Verdun) is an arena located in the borough of Verdun, in Montreal, Quebec, Canada. The building opened on November 28, 1939, and holds 4,114 seats. It is the largest arena in the west end of Montreal, the complex is also home to Arena Denis Savard, a small minor-hockey rink, attached to its side. The Auditorium has hosted various Quebec Major Junior Hockey League (QMJHL) teams, including the Verdun Juniors, Verdun Éperviers, and Verdun Collège Français. In 1993, it hosted the Montreal Dragons for their lone season in the short-lived National Basketball League. Since 2022, it has been the home to the Montreal Alliance of the Canadian Elite Basketball League (CEBL). The Auditorium was slated to become the home arena of Les Canadiennes de Montréal in 2019; however, the CWHL folded in May of that year. The Verdun Auditorium would also be the home of the Montréal Victoire of the Professional Women's Hockey League (PWHL) for its inaugural season, before later moving to Place Bell.

On January 25, 2008, the QMJHL approved the sale of the St. John's Fog Devils to Montreal businessman Farrel Miller, who relocated the team to Montreal, where it was known as the Montreal Junior Hockey Club. In Summer 2011, the team moved to Boisbriand to become the Blainville-Boisbriand Armada.

The auditorium also hosted a concert by Nirvana on November 2, 1993. This was the band's last show in Montreal before frontman Kurt Cobain died five months later.

The Verdun Auditorium has hosted professional wrestling events, including shows promoted by Johnny Rougeau's All Star Wrestling, the Vachon Brothers' Grand Prix Wrestling and Lutte Internationale, and was the location of the first World Wrestling Federation event to be held in Montreal, though that event drew poorly against the better-established Lutte Internationale.

Major upgrades of the arena were undertaken in 2018 with plans for completion in 2020. These $42 million renovations made upgrades to the safety of the facility, as well as a restoration of the brick façade.

In May 2022, the arena hosted the first home game of the CEBL's Montreal Alliance. The Alliance won 80–70 over the Scarborough Shooting Stars in front of a near-sell out crowd.

On July 20, 2024, TNA Wrestling held its Slammiversary pay-per-view at the Auditorium followed by tapings for its Impact! and Xplosion weekly shows the following day.

== History ==
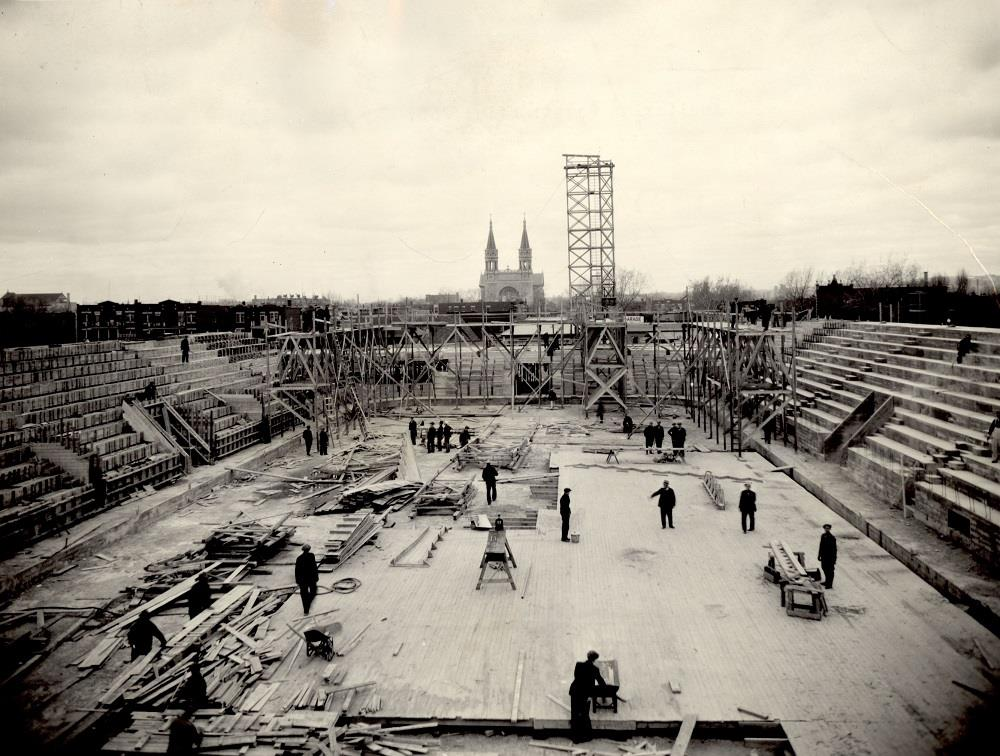
Construction of Verdun Auditorium

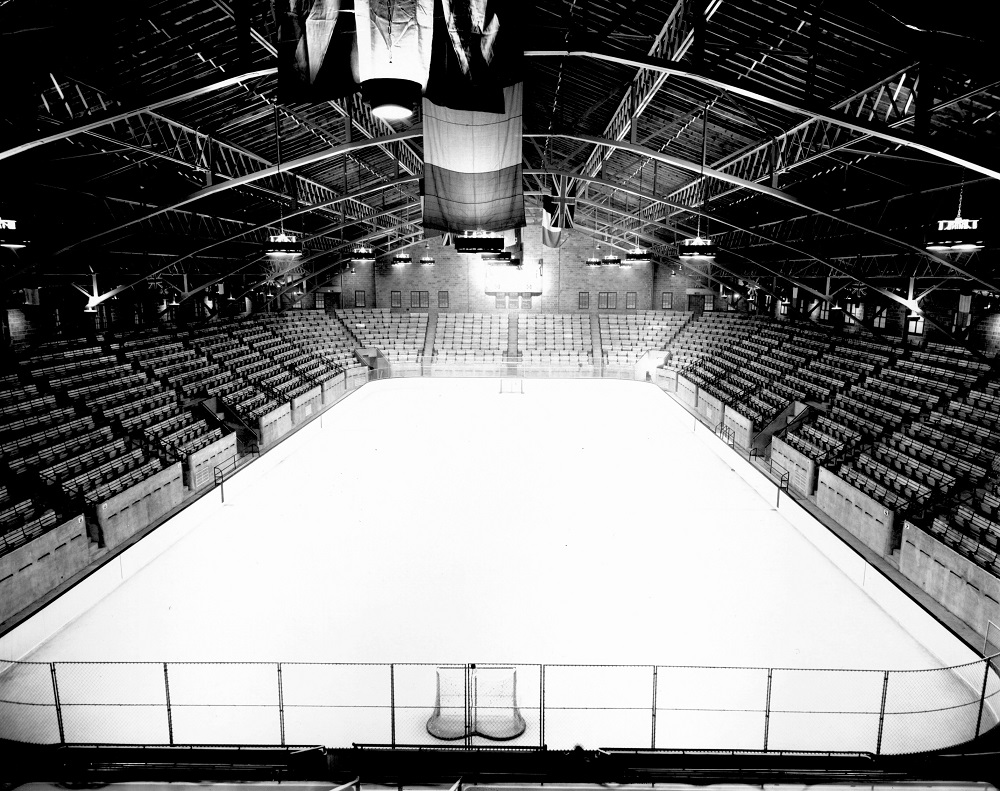
1939

In 1938 Verdun Auditorium opened its doors to the public. It wasn't until 1946 that hockey was hosted at the Auditorium. Today it remains one of the oldest arenas in Montreal.

== Events ==
Concerts

- 7 May 1982: Asia (early supergroup)
- 12 June 1982: Rainbow
- 26 June 1982: Iron Maiden
- 26 October 1982: Judas Priest
- 9 June 1984: Mötley Crüe
- 18 October 1986: A-ha
- 3 December 1986: Metallica
- 14 November 1988: Slayer, Motörhead and Overkill
- 18 January 1992: Ozzy Osbourne
- 15 November 1992: Megadeth and Suicidal Tendencies
- 19 August 1993: Pearl Jam
- 2 November 1993: Nirvana
- 15 March 1994: Sepultura
- 30 November 1994: Die Toten Hosen
- 4 March 1995: Pantera
- 11 October 1995: Ozzy Osbourne
- 28 November 1995: White Zombie and the Ramones
- 9 February 1996: Iron Maiden
- 26 April 1996: Bob Dylan
- 7 August 1996: Rage Against the Machine
- 17 September 1996: Backstreet Boys
- 17 October 2000: Bad Religion
- 23 April 2003: Good Charlotte, Less Than Jake, New Found Glory
- 6 July 2003: Foo Fighters
- 25 November 2003: Deftones
- 22 June 2004: The Darkness
- 10 July 2023: Foo Fighters

Sports

- 31 October 1978: Fernand Marcotte faces Eddie Melo in the first of three fights between them.
- 7 May 1993: First home game for Montreal Dragons of the National Basketball League, a 117–110 win over the Halifax Windjammers
- 29 May 2022: First home game for Montreal Alliance of the Canadian Elite Basketball League, an 80–70 Win in front of 3,500 fans.
- 13 January 2024 PWHL Montreal Home debut in the Professional Women's Hockey League, a 3–2 OT loss to PWHL Boston playing in front of a sold-out crowd of 3,245 fans
- 9–11 August 2024 Canadian Elite Basketball League Championship Weekend
