= 4th Canadian Women's Hockey League All-Star Game =

4th CWHL All-Star Game
	1	2	3	Total
Team Purple	0	3	1	4
Team Gold	2	3	3	8
- Date: January 20, 2019
- Arena: Scotiabank Centre
- City: Toronto, Ontario, Canada
- MVP: To Be Determined

The 4th Canadian Women's Hockey League All-Star Game took place on January 20, 2019, at Scotiabank Centre in Toronto, Ontario, Canada. The event featured three 20-minute periods.

Brigitte Lacquette served as captain for Team Purple, while goaltender Liz Knox was the captain for Team Gold. Former NHL goaltender Curtis Joseph served in the capacity of head coach for Team Purple, with Cheryl Pounder serving as assistant coach. Glenn Healy was the head coach with Team Gold, as Charline Labonte took on the role of assistant coach.

== News and notes ==
=== Fan balloting ===
All-Star captains were selected via an online fan vote. Calgary Inferno blueliner Brigitte Lacquette secured over 90 percent of the vote to be named one of the captains. Lix Knox, a goaltender from the Markham Thunder, finished in second place in the overall vote, gaining the chance to serve as the second All-Star captain.

== Players named ==
The rosters announced in three different press releases. The first press release announcing the group of All-Stars was issued on December 3, 2018.

=== First round ===
Player	Nationality	Position	Team
Rebecca Johnston	Canada	Forward	Calgary Inferno
Hilary Knight	United States	Forward	Canadiennes de Montreal
Jocelyne Larocque	Canada	Defense	Markham Thunder
Rachel Llanes	United States	Forward	Shenzhen KRS Vanke Rays
Marie-Philip Poulin	Canada	Forward	Canadiennes de Montreal
Alex Rigsby	United States	Goaltender	Calgary Inferno
Laura Stacey	Canada	Forward	Markham Thunder
Natalie Spooner	Canada	Forward	Toronto Furies
Blayre Turnbull	Canada	Forward	Calgary Inferno
Lauren Williams	United States	Defense	Worcester Blades
Jessica Wong	Canada	Forward	Shenzhen KRS Vanke Rays

=== Second round ===
Player	Nationality	Position	Team
Erin Ambrose	Canada	Defense	Canadiennes de Montreal
Kacey Bellamy	United States	Defense	Calgary Inferno
Megan Bozek	United States	Defense	Markham Thunder
Hanna Bunton	Canada	Forward	Shenzhen KRS Vanke Rays
Mellissa Channell	Canada	Defense	Toronto Furies
Liz Knox	Canada	Goaltender	Markham Thunder
Halli Krzyzaniak	Canada	Defense	Calgary Inferno
Brigette Lacquette	Canada	Defense	Calgary Inferno
Emerance Maschmeyer	Canada	Goaltender	Canadiennes de Montreal
Jamie Lee Rattray	Canada	Forward	Markham Thunder
Lauriane Rougeau	Canada	Defense	Canadiennes de Montreal
Jillian Saulnier	Canada	Forward	Calgary Inferno

=== Third round ===
Player	Nationality	Position	Team
Victoria Bach	Canada	Forward	Markham Thunder
Ann-Sophie Bettez	Canada	Forward	Canadiennes de Montreal
Alex Carpenter	United States	Forward	Shenzhen KRS Vanke Rays
Brianna Decker	United States	Forward	Calgary Inferno
Renata Fast	Canada	Defense	Toronto Furies
Laura Fortino	Canada	Defense	Markham Thunder
Zoe Hickel	Canada	Forward	Calgary Inferno
Brianne Jenner	Canada	Forward	Calgary Inferno
Hannah Miller	Canada	Forward	Shenzhen KRS Rays
Sarah Nurse	Canada	Forward	Toronto Furies
Noora Raty	Finland	Goaltender	Shenzhen KRS Vanke Rays
