= 2013 IIHF U18 Women's World Championship =

Tournament details
- Host country: Finland
- Venue(s): Versowood Areena, Arena Vierumaki (in 1 host city)
- Dates: 29 December 2012 – 5 January 2013
- Teams: 8

Final positions
- Champions: Canada (3rd title)
- Runners-up: United States
- Third place: Sweden
- Fourth place: Czech Republic

Tournament statistics
- Games played: 21
- Goals scored: 133 (6.33 per game)
- Attendance: 6,164 (294 per game)
- Scoring leader: (United States) Katherine Schipper (13 points)

Awards
- MVP: (United States) Katherine Schipper

The 2013 IIHF U18 Women's World Championships was the sixth IIHF U18 Women's World Championship and was hosted in Finland. It began on 29 December 2012, with the gold medal game played on 5 January 2013.

== Top Division ==
=== Preliminary round ===
All times are local (UTC+2).

==== Group A ====
Team	Pld	W	OTW	OTL	L	GF	GA	GD	Pts	Qualification
Canada	3	3	0	0	0	15	1	+14	9	Semifinals
Finland	3	2	0	0	1	7	6	+1	6	Quarterfinals
Hungary	3	0	1	0	2	3	9	−6	2	Quarterfinals
Germany	3	0	0	1	2	3	12	−9	1	Relegation round

Source: IIHF

29 December 2012; 15:30	Germany	2–3 (0–0, 1–1, 1–2)	Finland	Versowood Areena; Attendance: 758

Game reference

Franziska Alb
Goalies
Eveliina Suonpää
Referee:
(Japan) Miyuki Nakayama
Linesmen:
(Russia) Olga Steinberg
(United States) Andrea Weissman

K. Spielberger (A-K. Voog) (PP) – 21:08	1–0
	1–1	36:01 – E. Rakkolainen (V. Kotkaslahti)
B. Karpf (K. Spielberger) – 40:40	2–1
	2–2	50:29 – E. Nuutinen (A. Rantanen, V. Tanskanen) (PP)
	2–3	59:28 – E. Nuutinen (A. Kilponen)

14 min
Penalties
14 min
19
Shots
52

29 December 2012; 17:30	Canada	4–1 (1–0, 1–1, 2–0)	Hungary	Arena Vierumaki; Attendance: 154

Game reference

Jessica Dodds
Goalies
Anikó Németh
Referee:
(Finland) Kaisa Ketonen
Linesmen:
(Slovakia) Viera Šilhavíková
(Finland) Jenni Visala

A. Brykaliuk (H. Krzyzaniak) – 16:35	1–0
	1–1	T. Horváth (A. Huszák, K. Jókai-Szilágyi) – 31:02
C. Carels (SH) – 34:28	2–1
K. Heffernan (C. Dubois, C. Daoust) – 40:57	3–1
E. Murray (H. Krzyzaniak, K. Capizzano) – 43:16	4–1

8 min
Penalties
10 min
39
Shots
12

30 December 2012; 15:00	Germany	1–2 OT (1–0, 0–1, 0–0) (OT: 0–1)	Hungary	Arena Vierumaki; Attendance: 73

Game reference

Franziska Albl
Goalies
Anikó Németh
Referee:
(Canada) Gabielle Ariano-Lortie
Linesmen:
(Finland) Jonna Partanen
(Canada) Vanessa Stratton

M. Lubbert (K. Spielberger) – 14:59	1–0
	1–1	25:11 – B. Németh (A. Huszák, K. Jókai-Szilágyi) (PP)
	1–2	62:28 – A. Huszák (F. Kiss-Simon)

12 min
Penalties
14 min
18
Shots
27

30 December 2012; 17:30	Finland	0–4 (0–2, 0–2, 0–0)	Canada	Versowood Areena; Attendance: 827

Game reference

Eveliina Suonpää
Goalies
Kimberly Newell
Referee:
(Netherlands) Debby Hengst
Linesmen:
(Germany) Lisa Huffner
(United States) Andrea Weissman

0–1	05:29 – E. Clark (C. Jacobson)
0–2	18:50 – C. Dubois (S. Steele) (PP)
0–3	31:05 – C. Dubois (H. Miller, H. Bunton)
0–4	39:12 – H. Bunton (S. Steele, H. Krzyzaniak) (PP)

14 min
Penalties
6 min
10
Shots
35

1 January 2013; 15:00	Canada	7–0 (3–0, 2–0, 2–0)	Germany	Arena Vierumaki; Attendance: 114

Game reference

Jessica Dodds
Goalies
Lena Schuster
Referee:
(Finland) Anna Eskola
Linesmen:
(Finland) Jenni Visala
(United States) Andrea Weissman

H. Krzyzaniak (H. Bunton) – 09:25	1–0
H. Bunton (C. Dubois) – 09:46	2–0
C. Daoust (E. Clark, H. Miller) (PP) – 16:25	3–0
A. Brykaliuk (K. Gilmour) – 25:37	4–0
H. Krzyzaniak (E. Clark) (PP) – 32:20	5–0
S. Nurse (H. Krzyzaniak) (SH) – 43:21	6–0
H. Miller (A. Brykaliuk, E. Clark) (PP) – 49:31	7–0

8 min
Penalties
10 min
67
Shots
5

1 January 2013; 17:30	Hungary	0–4 (0–3, 0–1, 0–0)	Finland	Versowood Areena; Attendance: 574

Game reference

Anikó Németh
Renáta Poltzer
Goalies
Eveliina Suonpää
Referee:
(United States) Jerilyn Glenn
Linesmen:
(Switzerland) Evelyne Loretan
(Slovakia) Viera Šilhavíková

0–1	V. Tanskanen (M. Klemola) – 03:50
0–2	J. Yli-Maenpaa (A. Klemola) (PP) – 06:40
0–3	E. Nuutinen (S. Hakala) – 12:08
0–4	E. Nuutinen (L. Lehtikangas) – 35:34

12 min
Penalties
12 min
25
Shots
29

==== Group B ====
Team	Pld	W	OTW	OTL	L	GF	GA	GD	Pts	Qualification
United States	3	3	0	0	0	25	0	+25	9	Semifinals
Sweden	3	1	0	1	1	7	15	−8	4	Quarterfinals
Czech Republic	3	1	0	0	2	7	17	−10	3	Quarterfinals
Russia	3	0	1	0	2	9	16	−7	2	Relegation round

Source: IIHF

29 December 2012; 12:00	Sweden	3–2 (1–1, 1–0, 1–1)	Czech Republic	Versowood Areena; Attendance: 153

Game reference

Julia Åberg
Goalies
Barbora Dvořáková
Referee:
(Finland) Anna Eskola
Linesmen:
(France) Charlotte Girard
(Switzerland) Evelyne Loretan

	0–1	11:43 – D. Forejtová
V. Hummelgård (A. Ekstedt, I. Karlsson) – 14:40	1–1
J. Törnhult (L. Hedin, O. Carlsson) (PP) – 20:39	2–1
	2–2	58:24 – T. Vanišová (K. Chmelová, D. Pelikánová) (PP)
J. Lennartsson (E. Johansson, M. Jakobsson) – 59:32	3–2

8 min
Penalties
12 min
31
Shots
33

29 December 2012; 14:00	United States	7–0 (3–0, 1–0, 3–0)	Russia	Arena Vierumaki; Attendance: 148

Game reference

Sidney Peters
Goalies
Nadezhda Morozova
Tatyana Shukina
Referee:
(Netherlands) Debby Hengst
Linesmen:
(Germany) Lisa Huffner
(Finland) Jonna Partanen

S. Morin (T. Cianfarano, G. Zarzecki) (PP) – 09:03	1–0
M. Wolfe (K. Schipper, M. Rolfes) – 16:11	2–0
M. Rodgers (A. Laing, M. Kent) (EA) – 17:15	3–0
T. Cianfarano (G. Zarzecki, B. Wellhausen) – 28:54	4–0
K. Schipper (M. Wolfe) (PP) – 46:45	5–0
D. Cameranesi (J. Dunne, K. Pannek) – 53:07	6–0
J. Dunne (M. Wolfe, K. Schipper) – 56:01	7–0

2 min
Penalties
18 min
55
Shots
7

30 December 2012; 14:00	Czech Republic	0–10 (0–5, 0–2, 0–3)	United States	Versowood Areena; Attendance: 215

Game reference

Klára Peslarová
Barbora Dvořáková
Goalies
Alexis Shaw
Referee:
(Finland) Kaisa Ketonen
Linesmen:
(France) Charlotte Girard
(Russia) Olga Steinberg

0–1	02:01 – A. Menke (G. Hirschy, M. Rolfes) (PP)
0–2	04:19 – G. Zarzecki (M. Rolfes)
0–3	10:48 – A. Menke (G. Hirschy, K. Schipper)
0–4	11:29 – F. McKenna (A. Laing)
0–5	12:26 – K. Pannek (C. Piazza)
0–6	26:33 – M. Wolfe (T. Cianfarano, J. Ryan) (PP)
0–7	35:16 – T. Cianfarano (T. Willard)
0–8	44:35 – T. Cianfarano (B. Wellhausen)
0–9	53:51 – B. Wellhausen (T. Willard, J. Dunne) (PP)
0–10	59:41 – K. Pannek (C. Piazza, D. Cameranesi)

16 min
Penalties
2 min
10
Shots
53

30 December 2012; 18:30	Sweden	4–5 OT (2–1, 1–1, 1–2) (OT: 0–1)	Russia	Arena Vierumaki; Attendance: 135

Game reference

Maria Omberg
Goalies
Tatyana Shukina
Referee:
(United States) Jerilyn Glenn
Linesmen:
(Slovakia) Viera Šilhavíková
(Finland) Jenni Visala

L. Hedin (I. Palm, M. Löwenhielm) (PP) – 06:08	1–0
E. Johansson (J. Lennartsson, M. Jakobsson) – 10:10	2–0
	2–1	15:11 – Y. Dergachyova
	2–2	27:12 – D. Bulatova (V. Pavlova)
M. Axelsson (M. Hall) – 27:47	3–2
E. Johansson – 42:53	4–2
	4–3	57:35 – Y. Nikolayeva (A. Shokhina)
	4–4	58:26 – A. Shokhina (D. Bulatova)
	4–5	64:28 – Y. Dergachyova (A. Chistyakova)

6 min
Penalties
12 min
29
Shots
38

1 January 2013; 14:00	United States	8–0 (4–0, 2–0, 2–0)	Sweden	Versowood Areena; Attendance: 174

Game reference

Sidney Peters
Goalies
Maria Omberg
Olga Murase
Referee:
(Canada) Gabielle Ariano-Lortie
Linesmen:
(Russia) Olga Steinberg
(Canada) Vanessa Stratton

C. Piazza (D. Cameranesi) – 10:26	1–0
G. Zarzecki (B. Wellhausen) – 10:44	2–0
M. Wolfe (T. Cianfarano) – 11:35	3–0
J. Ryan (J. Dunne, K. Schipper) – 11:51	4–0
K. Schipper (A. Menke) – 20:59	5–0
T. Cianfarano (T. Willard) – 30:44	6–0
K. Schipper (A. Menke) – 42:15	7–0
D. Cameranesi (J. Dunne, J. Ryan) (PP) – 47:41	8–0

6 min
Penalties
6 min
57
Shots
10

1 January 2013; 18:30	Russia	4–5 (2–3, 1–1, 1–1)	Czech Republic	Arena Vierumaki; Attendance: 155

Game reference

Tatyana Shukina
Nadezhda Morozova
Goalies
Klára Peslarová
Referee:
(Japan) Miyuki Nakayama
Linesmen:
(France) Charlotte Girard
(Finland) Jonna Partanen

	0–1	02:35 – K. Chmelová (V. Přibylová, A. Tejralová)
	0–2	04:48 – T. Vanišová (K. Chmelová)
A. Shokhina (A. Shtaryova) – 05:43	1–2
A. Shokhina (Y. Dergachyova, A. Shtaryova) – 11:49	2–2
	2–3	12:22 – K. Chmelová (V. Přibylová, T. Vanišová)
	2–4	21:19 – M. Pejzlova (V. Přibylová)
V. Pavlova (M. Batalova) – 33:03	3–4
A. Shokhina (Y. Dergachyova) (PP) – 55:10	4–4
	4–5	57:23 – M. Pejzlova (A. Lédlová)

4 min
Penalties
12 min
30
Shots
30

=== Relegation round ===
The teams played a best-of-three series. With Russia winning the first two meetings, a third one wasn't necessary and Germany was relegated to Division I in 2013.

All times are local (UTC+2).

2 January 2013; 16:00	Russia	5–3 (3–0, 1–2, 1–1)	Germany	Arena Vierumaki; Attendance: 64

Game reference

Nadezhda Morozova
Vlada Ovcharova
Goalies
Franziska Albl
Referee:
(Finland) Kaisa Ketonen
Linesmen:
(Finland) Jonna Partanen
(Slovakia) Viera Šilhavíková

V. Pavlova (Y. Dergachyova, Y. Nikolayeva) – 04:36	1–0
A. Shokhina (SH) – 09:00	2–0
N. Kovalyova (N. Modina, T. Kitayeva) – 12:26	3–0
T. Kitayeva (Y. Dergachyova) – 23:07	4–0
	4–1	25:26 – N. Eisenschmid (D. Reimann)
	4–2	29:26 – K.-L. Engel (L. Dusterhoft)
	4–3	44:39 – B. Engel (K. Spielberger, M. Scheuerlein)
Y. Dergachyova (ENG) – 59:59	5–3

20 min
Penalties
10 min
27
Shots
29

4 January 2013; 17:30	Germany	3–4 OT (1–1, 1–2, 1–0) (OT: 0–1)	Russia	Arena Vierumaki; Attendance: 106

Game reference

Franziska Albl
Lena Schuster
Goalies
Nadezhda Morozova
Referee:
(Netherlands) Debby Hengst
Linesmen:
(Finland) Jonna Partanen
(Finland) Jenni Visala

L. Swikull (L. Kluge, N. Eisenschmid) – 09:26	1–0
	1–1	16:05 – Y. Nikolayeva (T. Kitayeva, D. Bulatova) (PP)
D. Reimann (L. Kluge, M. Scheuerlein) (PP2) – 21:32	2–1
	2–2	34:45 – A. Shokhina (Y. Dergachyova, A. Shtaryova)
	2–3	37:31 – V. Pavlova
M.-L. Schmid (M. Lubbert) – 59:02	3–3
	3–4	64:28 – Y. Dergachyova (D. Bulatova) (PP)

14 min
Penalties
35 min
18
Shots
46

=== Final round ===
Quarterfinals
A2	Finland	3
B3	Czech Republic	5
B2	Sweden	4
A3	Hungary	0

Semifinals
B1	United States	10
B3	Czech Republic	0
A1	Canada	7
B2	Sweden	2

Final
B1	United States	1
A1	Canada	2
Third place
B3	Czech Republic	0
B2	Sweden	4

All times are local (UTC+2).

==== Quarterfinals ====
2 January 2013; 14:30	Sweden	4–0 (3–0, 0–0, 1–0)	Hungary	Versowood Areena; Attendance: 78

Game reference

Minatsu Murase
Goalies
Anikó Németh
Referee:
(Netherlands) Debby Hengst
Linesmen:
(Germany) Lisa Huffner
(Russia) Olga Steinberg

M. Ekstedt (M. Hall) – 02:15	1–0
M. Jakobsson (M. Löwenhielm, I. Palm) – 10:54	2–0
A. Lundström (E. Strandberg, M. Löwenhielm) – 19:21	3–0
V. Hummelgård (M. Hall) (PP) – 54:52	4–0

8 min
Penalties
14 min
37
Shots
11

2 January 2013; 18:30	Finland	3–5 (2–2, 0–0, 1–3)	Czech Republic	Versowood Areena; Attendance: 633

Game reference

Eveliina Suonpää
Goalies
Barbora Dvořáková
Referee:
(Canada) Gabielle Ariano-Lortie
Linesmen:
(Canada) Vanessa Stratton
(United States) Andrea Weissman

V. Kotkaslahti (E. Nuutinen, J. Suokko) – 05:25	1–0
S. Hakala (E. Rakkolainen, A. Kilponen) – 06:19	2–0
	2–1	17:58 – A. Lédlová
	2–2	19:21 – T. Vanišová (K. Chmelová) (SH)
	2–3	44:54 – S. Kolowratová (A. Lédlová)
	2–4	46:42 – V. Přibylová (T. Vanišová, K. Chmelová)
	2–5	53:43 – A. Tejralová (K. Chmelová, S. Kolowratová) (PP)
S. Hakala (E. Rakkolainen, V. Kotkaslahti) (PP) – 55:17	3–5

16 min
Penalties
20 min
24
Shots
37

==== Semifinals ====
4 January 2013; 14:30	Canada	7–2 (2–0, 2–1, 3–1)	Sweden	Versowood Areena; Attendance: 287

Game reference

Kimberly Newell
Goalies
Minatsu Murase
Maria Omberg
Referee:
(United States) Jerilyn Glenn
Linesmen:
(France) Charlotte Girard
(United States) Andrea Weissman

K. Gilmour (H. Krzyzaniak) (PP) – 03:10	1–0
A. Brykaliuk (E. Clark) – 11:45	2–0
	2–1	21:07 – M. Jakobsson (J. Lennartsson) (PP)
G. Bannon (C. Dubois) – 28:52	3–1
A. Brykaliuk (K. Heffernan, S. Steele) (PP) – 32:38	4–1
K. Capizzano (C. Daoust) – 41:48	5–1
C. Dubois (H. Bunton) – 46:06	6–1
	6–2	47:37 – V. Hummelgård (D. Husak Asp, J. Lennartsson)
A. Brykaliuk (K. Heffernan) (PP) – 59:38	7–2

8 min
Penalties
10 min
47
Shots
25

4 January 2013; 18:30	United States	10–0 (4–0, 3–0, 3–0)	Czech Republic	Versowood Areena; Attendance: 216

Game reference

Alexis Shaw
Goalies
Klára Peslarová
Barbora Dvořáková
Referee:
(Finland) Anna Eskola
Linesmen:
(Germany) Lisa Huffner
(Canada) Vanessa Stratton

G. Zarzecki (D. Cameranesi, F. McKenna) – 12:06	1–0
M. Wolfe (K. Schipper, A. Menke) – 13:00	2–0
B. Wellhausen (G. Zarzecki, T. Cianfarano) (PP) – 14:59	3–0
K. Pannek (C. Piazza, D. Cameranesi) – 19:50	4–0
K. Schipper (A. Menke, M. Wolfe) (PP) – 26:22	5–0
A. Menke (K. Schipper) – 37:12	6–0
C. Piazza (A. Laing, K. Pannek) – 39:12	7–0
J. Dunne (J. Ryan, G. Zarzecki) (PP) – 44:31	8–0
K. Schipper (A. Menke, M. Wolfe) (PP) – 51:30	9–0
M. Rodgers (B. Wellhausen, F. McKenna) – 54:24	10–0

8 min
Penalties
18 min
76
Shots
13

==== Fifth place game ====
4 January 2013; 14:00	Finland	3–1 (0–0, 2–1, 1–0)	Hungary	Arena Vierumaki; Attendance: 142

Game reference

Kiira Laine
Goalies
Anikó Németh
Referee:
(Japan) Miyuki Nakayama
Linesmen:
(Slovakia) Viera Šilhavíková
(Russia) Olga Steinberg

E. Nuutinen (S. Kayhko) – 22:30	1–0
J. Suokko (S. Hakala, E. Nuutinen) – 26:52	2–0
	2–1	27:03 – A. Huszák (T. Horváth)
S. Hakala (E. Nuutinen, J. Suokko) (PP) – 55:10	3–1

6 min
Penalties
8 min
30
Shots
30

==== Bronze medal game ====
5 January 2013; 14:30	Sweden	4–0 (3–0, 1–0, 0–0)	Czech Republic	Versowood Areena; Attendance: 345

Game reference

Minatsu Murase
Goalies
Barbora Dvořáková
Klára Peslarová
Referee:
(Canada) Gabielle Ariano-Lortie
Linesmen:
(Canada) Vanessa Stratton
(United States) Andrea Weissman

L. Hedin (M. Löwenhielm) (PP) – 01:50	1–0
I. Palm (M. Löwenhielm, O. Carlsson) – 03:38	2–0
M. Höglund (I. Karlsson) – 10:34	3–0
M. Löwenhielm (O. Carlsson) – 36:42	4–0

10 min
Penalties
12 min
36
Shots
43

==== Final ====
5 January 2013; 18:30	United States	1–2 OT (1–0, 0–0, 0–1) (OT: 0–1)	Canada	Versowood Areena; Attendance: 813

Game reference

Sidney Peters
Goalies
Kimberly Newell
Referee:
(Finland) Anna Eskola
Linesmen:
(France) Charlotte Girard
(Finland) Jonna Partanen

J. Ryan (K. Schipper, A. Menke) (PP) – 18:04	1–0
	1–1	59:47 – C. Dubois (EA)
	1–2	60:58 – K. Heffernan (H. Bunton)

8 min
Penalties
12 min
40
Shots
25

=== Ranking and statistics ===
==== Final rankings ====
Pos	Grp	Team	Pld	W	OTW	OTL	L	GF	GA	GD	Pts	Final result
1	A	Canada	5	4	1	0	0	24	4	+20	14	Champions
2	B	United States	5	4	0	1	0	36	2	+34	13	Runners-up
3	B	Sweden	6	3	0	1	2	17	22	−5	10	Third place
4	B	Czech Republic	6	2	0	0	4	12	34	−22	6	Fourth place
5	A	Finland (H)	5	3	0	0	2	13	12	+1	9	Fifth place game
6	A	Hungary	5	0	1	0	4	4	16	−12	2	Fifth place game
7	B	Russia	5	1	2	0	2	18	22	−4	7	Win Relegation game
8	A	Germany	5	0	0	2	3	9	21	−12	2	Relegation to Division I A

Source: IIHF
(H) Host

==== Scoring leaders ====
List shows the top skaters sorted by points, then goals. If the list exceeds 10 skaters because of a tie in points, all of the tied skaters are shown.

Player	GP	G	A	Pts	+/−	PIM	POS
(United States) Katherine Schipper	5	5	8	13	+9	4	FW
(Russia) Yelena Dergachyova	5	4	5	9	+8	6	FW
(United States) Amy Menke	5	3	6	9	+8	2	FW
(Finland) Emma Nuutinen	5	5	3	8	+6	10	FW
(United States) Megan Wolfe	5	4	4	8	+9	0	FW
(Russia) Anna Shokhina	5	6	1	7	+5	8	FW
(Canada) Catherine Dubois	5	4	3	7	+7	2	FW
(United States) Grace Zarzecki	5	3	4	7	+4	0	FW
(United States) Jincy Roese	5	2	5	7	+11	0	D
(Canada) Halli Krzyzaniak	5	2	5	7	+7	8	D

GP = Games played; G = Goals; A = Assists; Pts = Points; +/− = P Plus–minus; PIM = Penalties in minutes; POS = Position

Source: IIHF.com

==== Leading goaltenders ====
Only the top five goaltenders, based on save percentage, who have played 40% of their team's minutes are included in this list.

Player	TOI	GA	GAA	Sv%	SO
(Canada) Kimberly Newell	180:11	3	1.00	96.00	1
(United States) Sidney Peters	180:58	2	0.66	95.24	2
(Sweden) Minatsu Murase	189:16	6	1.90	94.55	2
(Germany) Franziska Albl	246:40	13	3.16	91.39	0
(Finland) Eveliina Suonpää	238;31	11	2.77	90.52	1

TOI = Time on ice (minutes:seconds); GA = Goals against; GAA = Goals against average; Sv% = Save percentage; SO = Shutouts

Source: IIHF.com

==== Tournament awards ====
Best players selected by the directorate:

- Best Goaltender: (Sweden) Minatsu Murase
- Best Defenceman: (Canada) Halli Krzyzaniak
- Best Forward: (United States) Katherine Schipper

== Division I ==
=== Qualification tournament ===
The qualification tournament was played in Dumfries, Great Britain, from 27 October to 1 November 2012. The top two teams were promoted to Division I of this year, and the third team was promoted to Division I of next year, because starting in 2014 one team will be promoted from the qualification tournament and will wait until the following year to play in Division I.

Team	Pld	W	OTW	OTL	L	GF	GA	GD	Pts	Qualification
France	5	4	0	0	1	14	5	+9	12	2013 Division I
Slovakia	5	4	0	0	1	27	11	+16	12	2013 Division I
Great Britain	5	3	0	0	2	21	9	+12	9	2014 Division I
Italy	5	2	1	0	2	10	9	+1	8	
China	5	1	0	1	3	13	20	−7	4	
Kazakhstan	5	0	0	0	5	3	34	−31	0	

=== Final tournament ===
The 2013 Division I final tournament was played in Romanshorn, Switzerland, from 2 to 8 January 2013.

Team	Pld	W	OTW	OTL	L	GF	GA	GD	Pts	Promotion or relegation
Japan	5	4	1	0	0	18	7	+11	14	Promoted to the 2014 Top Division
Switzerland	5	3	0	1	1	17	6	+11	10	
France	5	3	0	0	2	11	11	0	9	
Norway	5	3	0	0	2	10	10	0	9	
Slovakia	5	1	0	0	4	8	12	−4	3	
Austria	5	0	0	0	5	7	25	−18	0	Relegated to the 2014 Division I Qualification

Source: IIHF
