= 2022–23 Montreal Force season =

2022–23 Montreal Force
- League: 6 PHF
- 2022–23 record: 5–6–1
- Home record: 4–7–1
- Road record: 4–7–1
- Goals for: 56
- Goals against: 70

Team information
- Coach: Peter Smith
- Assistant coach: Pierre Alain; Katia Clement-Heydra
- Captain: Ann-Sophie Bettez
- Alternate captains: Catherine Daoust; Sarah Lefort
- Arena: Centre 21.02 (practice facility)

Team leaders
- Goals: Ann-Sophie Bettez (11)
- Assists: Jade Downie-Landry (13)
- Points: Jade Downie-Landry (23)
- Penalty minutes: Sarah Lefort (27)
- Plus/minus: 3 tied at (+4)
- Wins: Tricia Deguire (5)
- Goals against average: Tricia Deguire (2.59)

The 2022–23 Montreal Force season is the first in franchise history. For the regular season, the club will host games throughout the province of Quebec. Ann-Sophie Bettez will serve as the franchise's first-ever captain.

== Regular season ==
=== News and notes ===
- November 5: The Force compete in their first game in franchise history. Opposing the Buffalo Beauts, Ann-Sophie Bettez scored in the first period on goaltender Lovisa Berndtsson, resulting in the franchise's first-ever goal.

=== Standings ===
Pos	Team	Pld	W	OTW	OTL	L	GF	GA	GD	Pts	
1	Boston Pride	24	15	4	1	4	92	52	+40	54	Playoffs
2	Toronto Six	24	15	2	2	5	87	62	+25	51	Playoffs
3	Connecticut Whale	24	13	1	2	8	83	66	+17	43	Playoffs
4	Minnesota Whitecaps	24	10	0	3	11	58	66	−8	33	Playoffs
5	Metropolitan Riveters	24	8	3	0	13	64	79	−15	30	
6	Montreal Force	24	5	3	2	14	56	70	−14	23	
7	Buffalo Beauts	24	5	0	3	16	50	95	−45	18	

Updated to match(es) played on March 5, 2023. Source: PHF (Note: A win in regulation time is awarded 3 points, 2 points are awarded for an overtime/shootout win, 1 point is awarded for an overtime/shootout loss, 0 points are awarded for a regulation loss) (Note: Tiebreaker order is: points, head-to-head record, regulation wins, wins, goal difference)

=== Schedule ===
Regular season schedule: (home: 4–7–1; road: 4–7–1)
November: 2–2–0, 5 points (home: 1–1–0; road: 1–1–0)

Game	Date	Opponent	Score	OT	Decision	Location	Record	Points	Recap
1	November 5	@ Buffalo Beauts	5–4	SO	Deguire	Northtown Center	1–0–0	2	Ann-Sophie Bettez scores the first goal in franchise history Tricia Deguire records the first shoot-out win in franchise history
2	November 6	@ Buffalo Beauts	2–3		Deschênes	Northtown Center	1–1–0	2	Kristina Shanahan and Deziray De Sousa record their first professional goals.
3	November 26	Metropolitan Riveters	5–3		Deguire	Verdun Auditorium	2–1–0	5	
4	November 27	Metropolitan Riveters	2–3		Deschênes	Arena Raymond Bourque	2–2–0	5	

December: 2–2–0, 5 points (home: 1–1–0; road: 1–1–0)

Game	Date	Opponent	Score	OT	Decision	Location	Record	Points	Recap
5	December 3	Connecticut Whale	4–3	SO	Deguire	Arena Conrad Parent	3–2–0	7	
6	December 4	Connecticut Whale	2–3		Deguire	Arena Conrad Parent	3–3–0	7	
7	December 17	@ Minnesota Whitecaps	2–5		Deguire	Richfield Ice Arena	3–4–0	7	
8	December 18	@ Minnesota Whitecaps	4–1		Deschênes	Richfield Ice Arena	4–4–0	10	

January: 2–3–1, 6 points (home: 1–2–1; road: 1–1–0)

Game	Date	Opponent	Score	OT	Decision	Location	Record	Points	Recap
9	January 7	Toronto Six	2–3	OT	Deschênes	Colisee Financiere Sun Life	4–4–1	11	
10	January 8	Toronto Six	2–3		Deguire	Colisee Financiere Sun Life	4–5–1	11	
11	January 14	@ Connecticut Whale	5–4		Deschênes	UPMC Lemiuex Sports Complex	5–5–1	14	
12	January 21	Boston Pride	0–5		Deschênes	Centre Premier Tech	5–6–1	14	
13	January 22	Boston Pride	2–1	OT	Deschênes	Centre Premier Tech	6–6–1	16	
14	January 27	@ Connecticut Whale	1–4		Deschênes	International Skating Center of CT	6–7–1	16	

February: 2–6–0, 6 points (home: 1–3–0; road: 1–3–0)

Game	Date	Opponent	Score	OT	Decision	Location	Record	Points	Recap
–	February 4	Minnesota Whitecaps				Arena regional de la Riviere-du-Nord			Postponed due to inclement weather; rescheduled for February 6.
15	February 5	Minnesota Whitecaps	1–4		Deguire	Arena regional de la Riviere-du-Nord	6–8–1	16	
16	February 6	Minnesota Whitecaps	2–3		Deguire	Arena regional de la Riviere-du-Nord	6–9–1	16	
17	February 11	@ Toronto Six	3–0		Deguire	Canlan Ice Sports – York	7–9–1	19	
18	February 12	@ Toronto Six	1–2		Deguire	Canlan Ice Sports – York	7–10–1	19	
19	February 18	@ Boston Pride	1–4		Deguire	Warrior Ice Arena	7–11–1	19	
20	February 19	@ Boston Pride	1–2		Deguire	Warrior Ice Arena	7–12–1	19	
21	February 25	Buffalo Beauts	1–3		Deguire	Pavillon de la Jeunesse	7–13–1	19	
22	February 26	Buffalo Beauts	6–2		Deguire	Pavillon de la Jeunesse	8–13–1	22	

March: 0–1–1, 1 points (home: 0–0–0; road: 0–1–1)

Game	Date	Opponent	Score	OT	Decision	Location	Record	Points	Recap
23	March 4	@ Metropolitan Riveters	1–2	OT	Deguire	The Rink at American Dream	8–13–2	23	
24	March 5	@ Metropolitan Riveters	3–4		Deschênes	The Rink at American Dream	8–14–2	23	

Regulation Win (3 points) Overtime/Shootout win (2 points) Overtime/shootout loss (1 point) Regulation Loss (0 points)

== Statistics ==
As of March 19, 2023.

=== Skaters ===
	Regular season					
Player	GP	G	A	Pts	SOG	PIM
Jade Downie-Landry	24	10	13	23	92	20
Ann-Sophie Bettez	23	11	11	22	84	8
Alexandra Labelle	24	6	7	13	62	12
Samantha Isbell	22	3	9	12	42	12
Sarah Lefort	17	7	3	10	60	27
Christine Deaudelin	23	3	6	9	53	11
Brooke Stacey	24	2	7	9	52	6
Taylor Baker	24	1	8	9	40	14
Kristina Shanahan	24	4	2	6	30	6
Catherine Dubois	24	2	4	6	48	10
Kaity Howarth	20	1	4	5	19	16
Kim Deschênes	23	1	4	5	37	10
Catherine Daoust	24	2	2	4	35	8
Deziray De Souza	20	1	3	4	32	7
Brigitte Laganière	24	1	3	4	44	17
Gabrielle De Serres	23	0	3	3	13	6
Autumn MacDougall	13	0	2	2	13	2
Laura Jardin	20	0	2	2	17	4
Alyssa Holmes	24	1	0	1	15	11
Maude Gelina	5	0	0	0	2	2
Sally Hoerr	6	0	0	0	1	0

=== Goaltenders ===
	Regular season															
Player	GP	W	L	T	OT	TOI	SA	GA	SV%	GAA	SO	Sv	PIM	G	A	GS
Marie-Soleil Deschênes	9	3	5	0	1	544:01	291	25	.914	2.76	0	266	0	0	1	9
Tricia Deguire	15	5	9	0	1	902:41	478	39	.918	2.59	1	439	0	0	1	15

== Roster ==
No.	Nat	Player	Pos	S/G	Age	Acquired	Birthplace
24	(Canada)	Ann-Sophie Bettez (C)	F	L	37	2022	Sept-Îles, Quebec
12	(Canada)	Catherine Daoust (A)	D	R	30	2022	L'Île-Bizard, Quebec
23	(Canada)	Gabrielle De Serres	D	R	27	2022	Mont-Royal, Quebec
18	(Canada)	Deziray De Sousa	F	L	27	2022	Montreal, Quebec
17	(Canada)	Christine Deaudelin	D	L	28	2022	Beloeil, Quebec
33	(Canada)	Tricia Deguire	G	L	27	2022	Sherbrooke, Quebec
9	(Canada)	Kim Deschênes	F	R	34	2022	Saint-Quentin, New Brunswick
39	(Canada)	Marie-Soleil Deschênes	G	R	31	2022	L'Île-Perrot, Quebec
27	(Canada)	Jade Downie-Landry	F	L	29	2022	St-Jean-sur-Richelieu, Quebec
28	(Canada)	Catherine Dubois	F	L	30	2022	Quebec City, Quebec
64	(Canada)	Maude Gélinas	F	L	33	2022	St-Bruno-de-Montarville, Quebec
60	(United States)	Sally Hoerr	D	L	28	2022	Colchester, Vermont
25	(Canada)	Alyssa Holmes	F	R	26	2022	Hamilton, Ontario
8	(Canada)	Kaity Howarth	D	L	27	2022	Thunder Bay, Ontario
5	(Canada)	Samantha Isbell	F	L	27	2022	Thunder Bay, Ontario
29	(Canada)	Laura Jardin	F	L	24–25	2022	Calgary, Alberta
13	(Canada)	Alexandra Labelle	F	L	29	2022	St-Louis-de-Gonzague, Quebec
26	(Canada)	Brigitte Laganière	D	L	29	2022	Anjou, Quebec
16	(Canada)	Sarah Lefort (A)	F	L	31	2022	Ormstown, Quebec
7	(Canada)	Kristina Shanahan	F	R	27	2022	Montreal, Quebec
3	(Canada)	Brooke Stacey	F	L	29	2022	Kahnawake, Quebec

Coaching staff and team personnel

- Head coach: Peter Smith
- Associate coach: Pierre Alain
- Assistant coach: Katia Clement-Heydra

== Awards and honors ==
=== Player of the Week ===
- Awarded November 28: Jade Downie-Landry - First Star, Ann-Sophie Bettez Third Star

== Transactions ==
- July 25, 2022: The franchise signed their first seven players, headlined by Ann-Sophie Bettez.
- October 12, 2022: The franchise added another five free agents to their roster.

=== Signings ===
Player	Date	Contract terms
July 25, 2022	Ann-Sophie Bettez	Undisclosed
July 25, 2022	Kim Deschenes	Undisclosed
July 25, 2022	Jade Downie-Landry	Undisclosed
July 25, 2022	Alexandra Labelle	Undisclosed
July 25, 2022	Sarah Lefort	Undisclosed
July 25, 2022	Kristina Shanahan	Undisclosed
July 25, 2022	Brigitte Laganiere	Undisclosed
August 10, 2022	Marie-Soleil Deschênes	Terms undisclosed
August 10, 2022	Kaity Howarth	Terms undisclosed
August 10, 2022	Alyssa Holmes	Terms undisclosed
August 10, 2022	Samantha Isbell	Terms undisclosed
August 10, 2022	Brooke Stacey	Terms undisclosed
October 12, 2022	Deziray De Sousa	Undisclosed
October 12, 2022	Maude Gelinas	Undisclosed
October 12, 2022	Laura Jardin	Undisclosed
October 12, 2022	Gabrielle De Serres	Undisclosed
October 12, 2022	Sally Hoerr	Undisclosed
