= Hanna Bunton =

Canadian ice hockey forward (born 1995)

- Born: May 7, 1995 (age 31) Belleville, Ontario, Canada
- Height: 175 cm (5 ft 9 in)
- Weight: 64 kg (141 lb; 10 st 1 lb)
- Position: Left Wing
- Shot: Left
- Played for: Shenzhen KRS Vanke Rays; Team Scotiabank; Team Sonnet
- National team: Canada
- Playing career: 2013–2024
Medal record
Women's ice hockey
World U18 Championships
Gold medal – first place	2013 Finland

Hanna Monique Bunton (born May 7, 1995) is a Canadian ice hockey coach and former player. She scored the first goal in Vanke Rays history, while they were competing in the CWHL. Along with Brigette Lacquette and Sarah Nurse, Bunton joined them on the cover (dated June 2021) of Elle Canada.

== Playing Career ==
=== Early Career ===
Bunton started playing hockey at the age of four or five. In her last year of midget hockey, she was invited to join the Whitby Wolves in the PWHL for the 2010—11 season but decided to remain with the Belleville Bearcats where she put up 94 points in 51 games. The team went on to win the Lower Lakes Female Hockey League East championship.

In the 2011—12 season, she joined the Whitby Wolves and led the team in goals, power-play goals, and game-winning goals and was ranked second overall in rookie scoring with 36 points (19 goals and 17 assists). She was named assistant captain for Team Ontario Red at the 2012 Canadian National Women's Under-18 Championship, where she won bronze. Bunton received the 2013 Robinson-Kelleher Memorial Award as Belleville's Athlete of the year.

Bunton was a three-sport athlete in school. In addition to hockey, she played point guard on her high school basketball team, hurdling, sprinting, and triple jumping on the track team. She was team MVP in all three sports but ultimately chose hockey.

=== College ===
After graduating from St. Theresa Catholic Secondary School, she accepted a scholarship to attend Cornell University. As a freshman, she was named ECAC Rookie for the week of November 19, and received the ECAC Hockey All-Rookie Team, and the 2014 NCAA Div 1 Ivy League Rookie of the Year.

During her 2014—15 sophomore season, seven of her goals were game-winning goals, including the game-winning goal in the ECAC Hockey semifinal.

In the Big Red's opening game of the 2015—16 season, Bunton scored the first goal of the season 4:50 in the third period against Boston College Eagles, breaking the 150 minute shutout from goalie Katie Burt. She followed up scoring her first hat-trick on November 21 against the Mercyhurst Lakers.

Bunton led the team in points during her senior year with 29 points, 10 goals and 19 assists. She was named the 2017 Ivy League Player of the Year and earned First-Team All-Ivy and ECAC Hockey Third Team votes. Across 125 NCAA games, she would finish her career with 37 goals and 51 points, totaling 88 points.

=== Professional ===
She was drafted 28th overall in the 2017 CWHL Draft by the Vanke Rays. She scored her first CWHL goal in her first game on the 28th of October 2017; the first goal in the franchise's history. She stayed with the team as it merged with Kunlun Red Star ahead of the 2018–19 season, where she would repeat her tally of 26 points in 28 games.

After the collapse of the CWHL in May 2019, she joined the PWHPA. She played for Team Johnston at the Unifor Showcase in September 2019 and took part in the PWHPA Skills Competition ahead of the Toronto Maple Leafs alumni game in January 2020. She was named to the roster of the Calgary section for the 2020—21 season where she would play two seasons.

In the fourth and final season of the PWHPA, Bunton played eight games with Team Sonnet for the 2022-23 PWHPA season.

=== International ===
Bunton played for Team Canada at the 2013 IIHF World Women's U18 Championship, scoring six points in five games as the country won gold. She assisted on the game-winning goal in overtime and was named as one of the top three Canadian players by the IIHF along with Catherine Dubois and Halli Krzyzaniak.

== Coaching Career ==
Bunton has been an Assistant Coach with the Prep Women's Hockey Program at Collège Bourget since 2022.

== Personal life ==
Bunton is the daughter of Robert and Anne Bunton. She has an older sister, Michelle. She grew up a Belleville Bulls fan.

She graduated with a degree in Human Development and a minor in nutritional science from Cornell University.

Bunton has been the Coordinator, Hockey operations for the U18 National Women's Program with Hockey Canada since 2022.

Bunton announced her retirement on Instagram on February 15, 2024.

She lives in Montreal with her longtime partner, Mélodie Daoust. The couple have a son, Bowie, born August 2025.

== Career statistics ==
=== Regular season and playoffs ===
			Regular season					Playoffs
Season	Team	League	GP	G	A	Pts	PIM	GP	G	A	Pts	PIM
2013–14	Cornell Big Red	ECAC	32	7	11	18	10	—	—	—	—	—
2014–15	Cornell Big Red	ECAC	28	7	7	14	10	—	—	—	—	—
2015–16	Cornell Big Red	ECAC	31	13	14	27	2	—	—	—	—	—
2016–17	Cornell Big Red	ECAC	34	10	19	29	12	—	—	—	—	—
2017–18	Vanke Rays	CWHL	28	15	11	26	18	—	—	—	—	—
2018–19	Shenzhen KRS Vanke Rays	CWHL	28	10	16	26	16	—	—	—	—	—
ECAC totals			125	37	51	88	34	—	—	—	—	—

=== International ===
Year	Team	Event	Result	GP	G	A	Pts	PIM
2013	Canada	U18	1st place, gold medalist(s)	5	2	4	6	2
Junior totals				5	2	4	6	2

== Awards and honors ==
=== NCAA ===
- ECAC Hockey All-Rookie Team (2014)
- Ivy League Rookie of the Year (2014)
- Second-Team All-Ivy (2016)
- First-Team All-Ivy (2017)
- ECAC Hockey Third Team (2017)
- Ivy League Player of the Year (2017)
