= 2018 CWHL Draft =

General information
- Date: August 26, 2018

Overview
- First selection: Lauren Williams, Worcester Blades

The 2018 CWHL Draft, the ninth and final in league history, took place on August 26. It marked the first and only draft Jayna Hefford served as CWHL commissioner. The CWHL indicated that general managers were authorized to "pre-sign" their first and second round selections before the draft. The window for pre-signing expired on August 17. Lauren Williams, a Canadian player and alumna of the Wisconsin Badgers women's ice hockey program, was the first pick overall in the draft. Long after this draft, the CWHL discontinued operations on May 1, 2019, having announced its intention on March 31.

== Draft presigning ==
Player	Team	Date
Kimberly Newell	Shenzhen KRS Vanke Rays	June 15, 2018
Halli Krzyzaniak	Calgary Inferno	July 31, 2018
Rebecca Leslie	Calgary Inferno	August 8, 2018

== Trades ==
On December 13, 2017, Erin Ambrose was traded from the Toronto Furies to Les Canadiennes de Montreal. The Furies received first and third round picks in the 2018 CWHL Draft, a first round pick from the 2019 CWHL Draft, plus a third round pick from the 2020 CWHL Draft. With the CWHL's dissolution, the 2019 and 2020 picks were extinguished.

== Results ==
=== Rounds 1–5 ===
Round	Pick	Player	Team	Nationality	Former team
1	1	Lauren Williams	Worcester Blades	Canada	Wisconsin Badgers
1	2	Sarah Nurse	Toronto Furies	Canada	Canadian Olympic Team
1	3	Victoria Bach	Markham Thunder	Canada	Boston University Terriers
1	4	Halli Krzyzaniak	Calgary Inferno	Canada	North Dakota Fighting Hawks
1	5	Kimberly Newell	Shenzhen KRS Vanke Rays	Canada	Princeton Tigers
1	6	Shea Tiley	Toronto Furies	Canada	Clarkson Golden Knights
2	7	Morgan Turner	Worcester Blades		Dartmouth Big Green
2	8	Brittany Howard	Toronto Furies	Canada	Robert Morris Colonials
2	9	Ailish Forfar	Markham Thunder	Canada	Ryerson Rams
2	10	Rebecca Leslie	Calgary Inferno	Canada	Boston University Terriers
2	11	Leah Lum	Shenzhen KRS Vanke Rays	Canada	Connecticut Huskies
2	12	Geneviève Bannon	Les Canadiennes de Montreal	Canada	Clarkson Golden Knights
3	13	Meghan Turner	Worcester Blades	United States	Quinnipiac Bobcats
3	14	Mellissa Channell	Toronto Furies	Canada	Wisconsin Badgers
3	15	Hannah Miller	Shenzhen KRS Vanke Rays	Canada	St. Lawrence Saints
3	16	Megan Sullivan	Markham Thunder		Colgate Raiders
3	17	Annie Bélanger	Calgary Inferno	Canada	Connecticut Huskies
3	18	Julia Fedeski	Toronto Furies	Canada	New Hampshire Wildcats
4	19	Jessica Convery	Worcester Blades		Minnesota Duluth Bulldogs
4	20	Emma Greco	Toronto Furies	Canada	Quinnipiac Bobcats
4	21	Daniella Matteucci	Markham Thunder	Canada	Clarkson Golden Knights
4	22	Alex Rigsby	Calgary Inferno	United States	US Olympic Team
4	23	Taylor Willard	Les Canadiennes de Montreal	United States	Vermont Catamounts
5	24	Rebecca Fleming	Worcester Blades		Connecticut Huskies
5	25	Mackenzie MacNeil	Toronto Furies	Canada	Vermont Catamounts
5	26	Gina Repaci	Markham Thunder	Canada	Vermont Catamounts
5	27	Tori Hickel	Calgary Inferno		Djurgarden (SDHL)
5	28	Catherine Daoust	Les Canadiennes de Montreal	Canada	Minnesota Duluth Bulldogs
