= Eveliina Mäkinen =

Finnish ice hockey goaltender and coacj (born 1995)

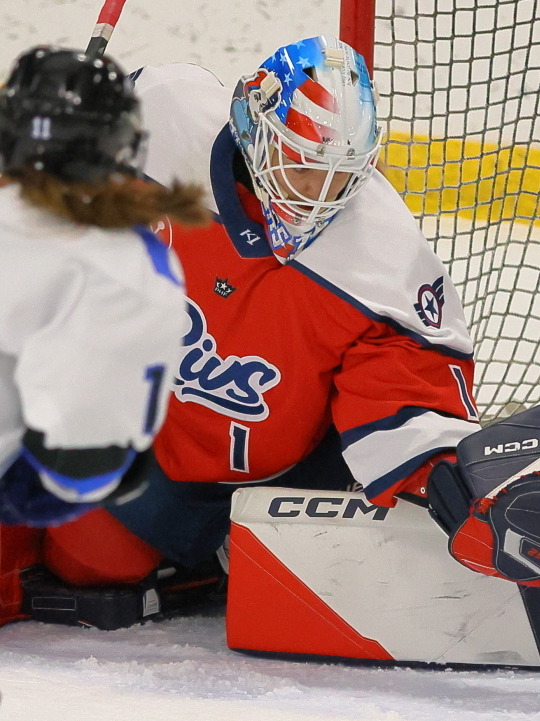
- Mäkinen with the Metropolitan Riveters in 2022
- Born: 12 April 1995 (age 31) Kiukainen, Finland
- Height: 1.74 m (5 ft 9 in)
- Weight: 68 kg (150 lb; 10 st 10 lb)
- Position: Goaltender
- Catches: Left
- PFWL team Former teams: ZSC Lions: EV Zug; EHC Sursee; Metropolitan Riveters; Brynäs IF; Leksands IF; Linköping HC; Lukko Rauma; Minnesota Duluth Bulldogs; Ilves Tampere; Team Kuortane
- Current coach: Switzerland U16
- National team: Finland
- Playing career: 2011–present
- Coaching career: 2025–present
Medal record
Olympic Games
Bronze medal – third place	2018 Pyeongchang	Ice hockey
Bronze medal – third place	2022 Beijing	Ice hockey
World Championship
Silver medal – second place	2019 Finland
Bronze medal – third place	2015 Sweden
Bronze medal – third place	2017 United States

Eveliina Mäkinen (née Suonpää; Born 12 April 1995) is a Finnish ice hockey goaltender and coach. She plays in the Swiss Women's League (PFWL) with ZSC Lions.

Mäkinen is a two-time Olympic medalist and three-time World Championship medalist with the Finnish national team.

== Playing career ==
Mäkinen began playing ice hockey at the age of four. She started playing with her brother and learned the game at a local ice hockey rink. She played on boys minor ice hockey teams until 2011 when she joined Team Oriflame Kuortane, the women's representative team of the Kuortaneen urheilulukio, in the Naisten SM-sarja (renamed Naisten Liiga in 2017 and Auroraliiga in 2024). In the 2012–13 season, her second with Team Oriflame, she posted 3.02 goals against average (GAA) and a .917 save percentage.

Mäkinen joined the Minnesota Duluth Bulldogs women's ice hockey program in January of the 2014–15 season. She saw action in just one game, as the Bulldogs' starting goaltender, Kayla Black, started 36 of 37 games that season.

Rather than return to the NCAA, Mäkinen opted to remain in Finland for the 2015–16 season and played with Ilves Naiset.

Between 2016 and 2018, she played as the starter for Lukko Naiset in the Naisten Liiga and played with Lukko U20 A in the men's U20 Suomi-sarja. She was recognized as Naisten SM-sarja Goaltender of the Year in 2017.

In May 2018, she announced that she was signing with Linköping HC in Sweden, taking over the starting position from the retiring Florence Schelling.

After two seasons with Linköping HC, she left the club to sign with Leksands IF for the 2020–21 SDHL season. In January 2021, she transferred to Brynäs IF and several months later signed a two-year contract with the club through the 2022–23 season.

Mäkinen tended goal for the Metropolitan Riveters of the Premier Hockey Federation (PHF) during the 2022–23 season.

== International career ==
Mäkinen played with the Finland women's national under-18 team during the 2013 IIHF World Women's U18 Championship, finishing with a 2.77 goals against average and .905 save percentage.

She made her debut on the senior national team in August 2013, with a 4–1 victory over Japan. She split goaltending for that game with Tiina Ranne, who was also making her debut with the team.

Mäkinen was chosen to play in the 2014 Winter Olympics as the third goaltender, a selection that she said took her by surprise. She was again named to Finland's roster for the 2018 Winter Olympics.

She represented Finland at the 2015, 2017, and 2019 IIHF Women's World Championship.

== Personal life ==
Mäkinen was born on 12 April 1995 in Kiukainen, a former municipality in the Satakunta region of Finland that was consolidated with Eura in 2009.

She married Finnish professional ice hockey defenseman Atte Mäkinen in 2021.

On the question of hitting in women's hockey, she stated in 2020 that "right now it’s really hard for the refs to differentiate what 'contact' means. Maybe there could be room for changes in the rules to allow more body contact without it overtaking the game."
