= Sarah Steele (ice hockey) =

Canadian ice hockey player (born 1995)

- Born: April 10, 1995 (age 31) Stratford, PEI, Canada
- Height: 168 cm (5 ft 6 in)
- Position: Forward
- Shoots: Left
- PHF team: Toronto Six
- Played for: KMH Budapest; Neuchâtel Hockey Academy; EHV Sabres Wien; Boston University Terriers
- Playing career: 2017–present

Sarah Steele is a Canadian ice hockey forward, currently playing with the Toronto Six of the Premier Hockey Federation (PHF).

== Career ==
Steele played youth hockey on boys' teams until 2004 when she made atom AA girls. when she began attending Appleby College prep school. After finishing her high school education, she received a full scholarship to play NCAA Division I ice hockey with the Boston University Terriers of the Hockey East conference. She scored 37 points in 151 games with the university and was twice named to the Hockey East All-Academic Team.

After graduating, she left North America to play with the Vienna-based EHV Sabres Wien of the European Women's Hockey League (EWHL). After one year in Austria, she joined Neuchâtel Hockey Academy of the Swiss Women's Hockey League A (SWHL A), where she scored 13 points in 18 games as the team won the Swiss Women's Cup. She returned to the EWHL for the 2019–20 season, joining Hungarian team KMH Budapest on a contract that allowed her to train full-time. She notched 17 points in 18 games during the season, finishing third among all EWHL defenders for points scored as the team won the EWHL Championship.

In July 2020, after three seasons abroad, she returned to Canada to sign with the newly-formed NWHL expansion team the Toronto Six. Along with fellow Six rookie Amy Curlew, she was one of only two players from Atlantic Canada competing in the 2020–21 NWHL season.

=== International ===
Steele represented Team Canada at the 2013 IIHF World Women's U18 Championship, getting three assists in five games as the country won gold.

== Personal life ==
Steele has bachelor's degrees in English and psychology from Boston University.
