= Amy Menke =

American ice hockey player (born 1995)

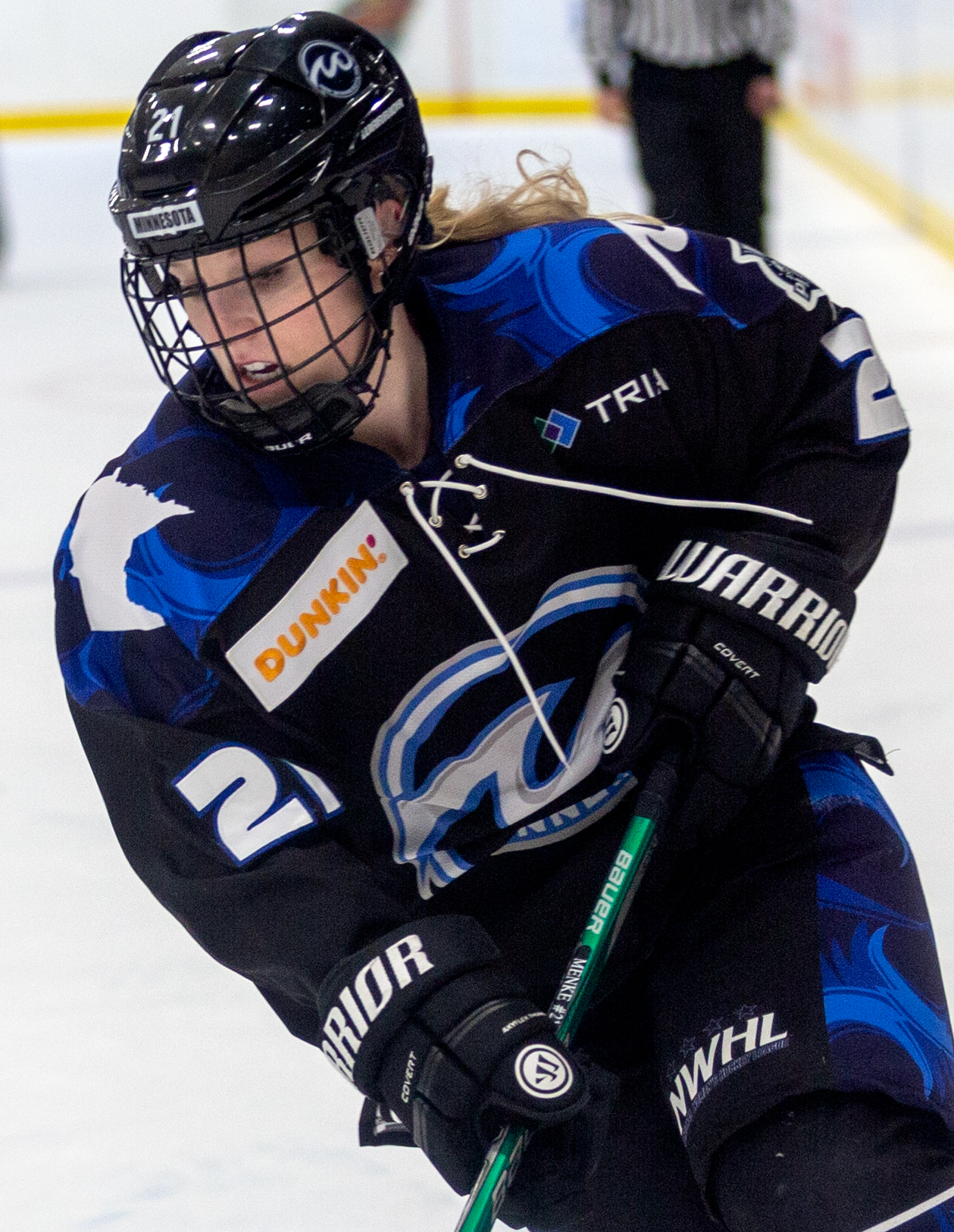
- Menke with the Minnesota Whitecaps in 2019
- Born: April 9, 1995 (age 31) Shakopee, Minnesota, United States
- Height: 168 cm (5 ft 6 in)
- Position: Forward
- Shoots: Right
- PWHPA team: Minnesota
- Played for: Shenzhen KRS Vanke Rays; Minnesota Whitecaps; Djurgårdens IF; University of North Dakota
- National team: United States
- Playing career: 2013–present

Amy Menke (born April 9, 1995) is an American professional ice hockey forward who last played with the Minnesota section of the PWHPA. She has previously won both the Isobel Cup and the ZhHL championship.

== Career ==
Across 146 NCAA games, Menke scored 108 points, serving as the University of North Dakota team captain in her senior year. Just weeks after her graduation, the university controversially announced that it was cutting its women's hockey program. She wrote an article in The Players' Tribune in response, stating that "Our program was a big family, and it died that day."

The summer before her senior year at the University of North Dakota, Menke was chosen to compete for team USA in a three game rivalry series against Team Canada. She competed for the U-22 team.

She was drafted 17th overall by the Metropolitan Riveters in the 2016 NWHL Draft. She joined the independent Minnesota Whitecaps ahead of the 2017–18 season. She would spend part of the season in Sweden, joining Djurgårdens IF in the SDHL for their playoff push.

She stayed with the Whitecaps as the team joined the NWHL, scoring 10 points in 15 games in 2018–19. She would score in the championship games as the Whitecaps won the Isobel Cup for the first time.

After the collapse of the CWHL in May 2019, she joined the over 200 players taking part in the ForTheGame movement, which later led to the creation of the PWHPA, sitting out from North American women's hockey leagues with the goal securing better investment and conditions for the sport. In August 2019, she signed with China-based Shenzhen KRS Vanke Rays, who had decided to switch to the ZhHL from the CWHL. She scored 17 points in 24 games for the club in 2019-20 as they won the Russian championship.

She was named to the roster for the Minnesota hub of the PWHPA ahead of the 2020–21 season.

== Personal life ==
Outside of hockey, Menke has worked. She has previously served as head coach for the Shakopee High School girls' hockey team.

== Career Statistics ==
=== Regular season and playoffs ===
			Regular season					Playoffs
Season	Team	League	GP	G	A	Pts	PIM	GP	G	A	Pts	PIM
2013–14	University of North Dakota	WCHA	36	5	8	13	16	—	—	—	—	—
2014–15	University of North Dakota	WCHA	36	15	13	28	16	—	—	—	—	—
2015–16	University of North Dakota	WCHA	35	19	21	40	12	—	—	—	—	—
2016–17	University of North Dakota	WCHA	38	11	16	27	44	—	—	—	—	—
2017–18	Djurgårdens IF	SDHL	5	4	2	6	4	4	1	2	3	0
2018-19	Minnesota Whitecaps	NWHL	15	4	6	10	8	2	1	1	2	0
2019-20	Shenzhen KRS	ZhHL	24	7	10	17	14	5	1	2	3	12
NCAA totals			146	50	58	108	88	—	—	—	—	—

=== International ===
Year	Team	Event	Result	GP	G	A	Pts	PIM
2013	USA	U18	2nd place, silver medalist(s)	5	3	6	9	2
Junior totals				5	3	6	9	2
