= Halli Krzyzaniak =

Canadian ice hockey player

- Born: February 4, 1995 (age 31) Brandon, Manitoba, Canada
- Height: 5 ft 7 in (170 cm)
- Weight: 161 lb (73 kg; 11 st 7 lb)
- Position: Defence
- Shot: Right
- Played for: PWHPA Calgary; Calgary Inferno; Djurgårdens IF
- National team: Canada
- Playing career: 2013–2024
Medal record
Women's ice hockey
Representing Canada
World Championships
Silver medal – second place	2015 Sweden
Silver medal – second place	2016 Canada
Silver medal – second place	2017 United States
World U18 Championships
Gold medal – first place	2012 Czech Republic
Gold medal – first place	2013 Finland

Halli Krzyzaniak (born February 4, 1995) is a Canadian former women's ice hockey player. She previously played in the PWHPA for the regional Calgary team and the Calgary Inferno. She spent four years at the University of North Dakota playing college hockey for the Fighting Hawks, a Division I team in the NCAA. Krzyzaniak played in the 2016–17 season, which was the last before the program was cancelled.

At the international level, she represented Canada from 2011 to 2019 at various levels. Following her hockey career, Krzyzaniak received a Doctor of Medicine degree from the Cumming School of Medicine.

== Playing career ==
=== Early life ===
Krzyzaniak is the daughter of Jim and Kelly. She has a brother, Kyle, and a sister, Abby. She grew up on a farm near Neepawa, Manitoba and at the age of four, developed an interest in hockey after watching her brother play. Her father built outdoors rinks where she started playing with her brother. Growing up, like many girls her age, Krzyzaniak primarily played on the boys teams.

At the age of 13, she moved to Kelowna, BC to attend the Pursuit of Excellence Program with the goal of taking the next step in hockey. She would spend five seasons in the program and was named captain in her final year.

In the 2010–11 season, she helped the team to a fourth place finish at the JWHL Challenge Cup and to a Canadian Sport School Hockey League (CSSHL) championship. In the 2011–12 season, she was named the CSSHL Top Defenceman.

Krzyzaniak was named an alternate captain of Team Manitoba team at the 2011 National Women's Under-18 Championship, and assisted on the game winning goal in the bronze medal game against Team Atlantic. She returned to the 2012 National Women's Under–18 Championship tournament for the third time and was named captain of Team Manitoba, helping to lead the team to its first silver medal. She was named MVP and top defenseman of the tournament.

In her senior year, she was the recipient of the 2013 Krug Crawford award by the Brandon Sun to recognize accomplishments in sports. She committed to the University of North Dakota to play in the women's hockey program.

=== College ===
As a freshman, Krzyzaniak played in all 36 games and finished the 2013–14 season tied for second in points by a defenseman on the team with 10 (2G, 8A). She assisted on Susanna Tapani's game-winning goal on November 17, 2013 which snapped the Minnesota Golden Gopher's 62-game win streak.

She was named to the All-WCHA third team following the 2014–15 season and 2015–16 season. In the same seasons, she saw her offensive results improve going from 13 points (2G, 11A) in 34 games in her sophomore year to 17 points (5G, 12A) in 33 games in her junior year. Krzyzaniak was named captain of the team prior to the 2015–16 season.

As a senior, she finished the 2016–17 season tied for scoring by a defenseman on the team with 18 points (5 G, 13 A) in 36 games. She was named to the 2017 All-WCHA Second Team and awarded the 2017 WCHA Post Graduate scholarship, awarding the winner a $7,500 grant for postgraduate studies. She planned to pursue medical school following her hockey career.

In her four seasons with the team, she would play 139 games. Her 58 points ranks third all-time at UND in points by a defenseman.

=== Professional ===
Krzyzaniak was selected in the 5th round, 16th overall, by the Boston Pride at the 2016 NWHL draft. She would not suit up for a game with the Pride.

Following her participation at Hockey Canada's Centralization Camp in the autumn of 2017, Krzyzaniak played with Djurgårdens IF of the Swedish Women's Hockey League, recording one assist in five regular season games and two assists in four playoff games.

In 2018, Krzyzaniak was drafted fourth overall by the Calgary Inferno in the 2018 CWHL Draft. She made her CWHL debut on October 13, 2018 in a game against Les Canadiennes de Montréal. Despite being a rookie, she was named to the 2019 CWHL All-Star Game. In the CWHL playoffs, she scored a goal in the championship game against Montréal, helping the Inferno win the 2019 CWHL Championship.

Following the collapse of the CWHL in 2019, Krzyzaniak joined the PWHPA for the Calgary region while pursuing a medical degree at the University of Calgary.

During the 2020–21 PWHPA season, she was named to the PWHPA All-stars team to face off against the Canada Women's National team on December 9 and December 13. In the Kipling tournament, she assisted on two goals, including the overtime winner, against Team Adidas.

== International Play ==
Krzyzaniak won a gold medal at the 2012 IIHF Ice Hockey U18 Championship with Team Canada U18 team.

She was named assistant captain alongside Emily Clark for team Canada the 2013 IIHF U18 Women's World Championship. The team won a second consecutive gold medal and she was named the best defenseman of the tournament. Members of the media voted her to the Hockey Canada Media All–Star Team, as one of two Canadians alongside Kimberly Newell.

In 2014, Krzyzaniak made her debut with the Canada Women's National senior team at the 4 Nations Cup where she recorded one assist in four games and won a gold medal with the team.

Krzyzaniak won three silver medals at the 2015, 2016, and 2017 World Championship.

She was invited to attend the Olympic tryouts for the Pyeongchang Olympics but was among the last roster cuts.

== Personal life ==
Krzyzaniak comes from a hockey family; her uncle, Rick Blight played for the Vancouver Canucks. Her father played Junior A in Canada, her brother Kyle played in the WHL for the Brandon Wheat Kings and Spokane Chiefs, and her sister Abby played for the University of Alberta.

Krzyzaniak has previously competed at the Manitoba games for softball.

While in college, she balanced athletic success and academic success and was named to the 2017 College Sports Information Directors of America (CoSIDA) Academic All-District Women's NCAA Division I First Team. She would graduate with a major in Biology & pre-health with a 3.92 GPA. She has a Doctor of Medicine and is a resident doctor in the University of Calgary Vascular Surgery program.

== Career statistics ==
=== Regular season and playoffs ===
			Regular season					Playoffs
Season	Team	League	GP	G	A	Pts	PIM	GP	G	A	Pts	PIM
2013–14	University of North Dakota	NCAA	36	2	8	10	12	—	—	—	—	—
2014–15	University of North Dakota	NCAA	34	2	11	13	22	—	—	—	—	—
2015–16	University of North Dakota	NCAA	33	5	12	17	16	—	—	—	—	—
2016–17	University of North Dakota	NCAA	36	5	13	18	21	—	—	—	—	—
2017–18	Djurgårdens IF	SDHL	5	0	1	1	4	4	0	2	2	0
2018–19	Calgary Inferno	CWHL	27	4	9	13	26	4	1	1	2	2
NCAA totals			139	14	44	58	71	—	—	—	—	—
CWHL totals			27	4	9	13	26	4	1	1	2	2

=== International ===
Year	Team	Event	Result	GP	G	A	Pts	PIM
2012	Canada	U18	1st place, gold medalist(s)	5	0	1	1	8
2013	Canada	U18	1st place, gold medalist(s)	5	2	5	7	8
2015	Canada	WC	2nd place, silver medalist(s)	5	0	1	1	2
2016	Canada	WC	2nd place, silver medalist(s)	5	2	0	2	6
2017	Canada	WC	2nd place, silver medalist(s)	5	0	1	1	2
Senior totals				15	2	2	4	10

=== Awards and honors ===
Award	Year(s)	Ref.
WCHA
All-WCHA Second Team	2017	
