= Hannah Miller (ice hockey) =

Canadian ice hockey player (born 1996)

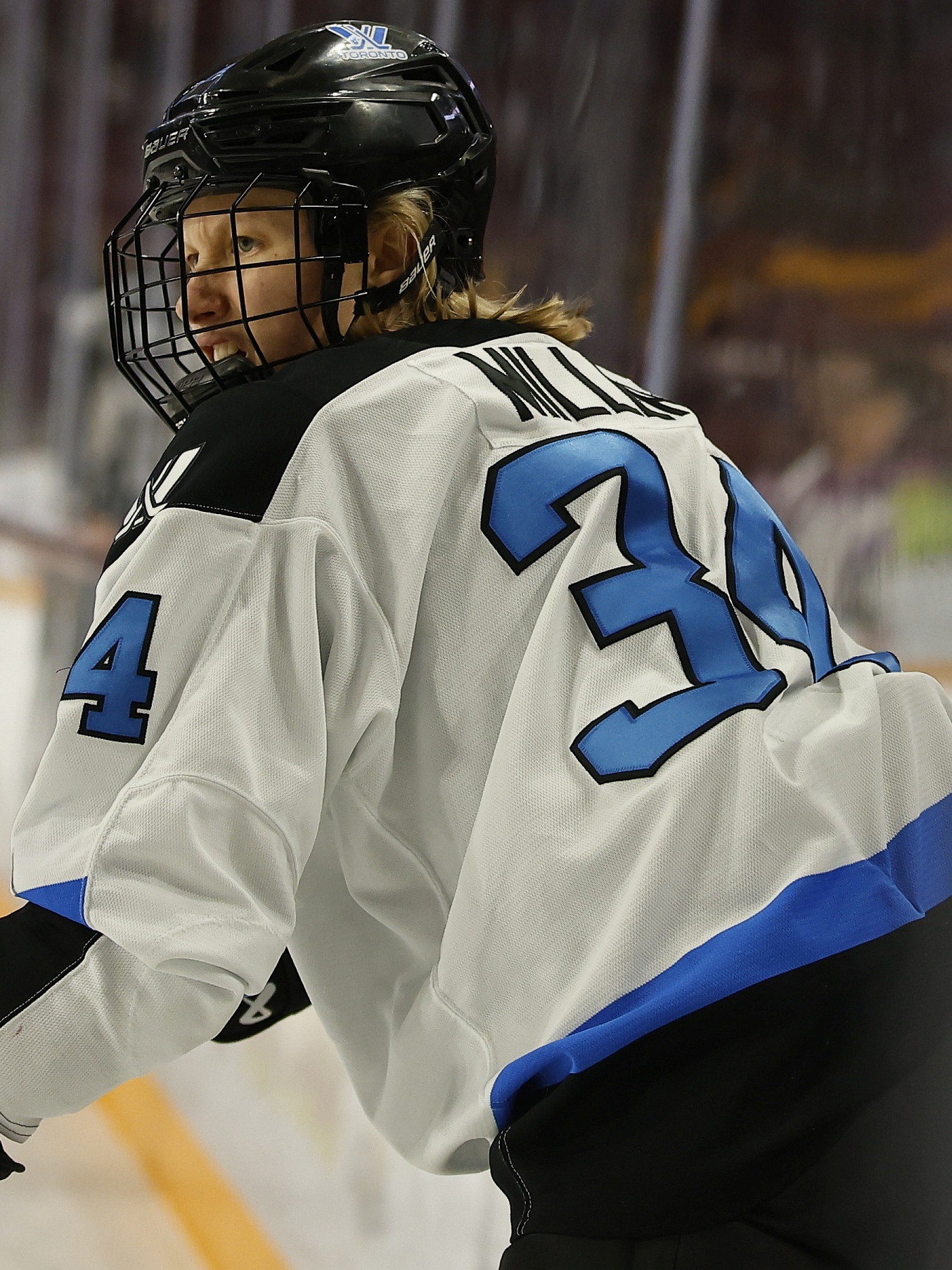
- Miller with PWHL Toronto in 2024
- Born: February 16, 1996 (age 30) North Vancouver, British Columbia, Canada
- Height: 175 cm (5 ft 9 in)
- Weight: 81 kg (179 lb; 12 st 11 lb)
- Position: Forward
- Shoots: Left
- PWHL team Former teams: Vancouver Goldeneyes: Toronto Sceptres; Shenzhen KRS; Djurgårdens IF
- Playing career: 2014–present

Mi Le
- Traditional Chinese: 米勒
- Simplified Chinese: 米勒
Transcriptions
Standard Mandarin
- Hanyu Pinyin: Mǐ Lēi
Yue: Cantonese
- Yale Romanization: Máih Lahk

Hannah Miller (born February 16, 1996), also known by the Chinese name Mi Le (Chinese: 米勒; pinyin: Mǐ Lè), is a Canadian professional ice hockey player for the Vancouver Goldeneyes of the Professional Women's Hockey League (PWHL).

She has previously played for the Chinese national ice hockey team and represented China in the women's ice hockey tournament at the 2022 Winter Olympics in Beijing.

== Playing career ==
Miller played ice hockey in the Junior Women's Hockey League (JWHL) with the under-18 prep team of the Okanagan Hockey Academy, based in Penticton, British Columbia, Canada, from 2012 to 2014.

=== College ===
Miller played college ice hockey with the St. Lawrence Saints women's ice hockey program in the ECAC Hockey conference of the NCAA Division I from the 2014–15 season to the 2017–18 season. As a junior in the 2016–17 season, she ranked sixth in the country with 0.92 assists per game and eleventh nationally with 1.33 points per game, tallying 15 goals and 33 assists for 48 points in 36 games, and was recognized as the ECAC Player of the Month on 2 February. She was selected as team captain for the 2017–18 season via player vote and, in her senior season, was the ECAC Player of the Week for October 11. Miller was named to the Second-Team All-ECAC Hockey in 2016–17 and 2017–18 and earned ECAC Hockey All-Academic honors in 2017–18.

=== Professional ===
After reaching out and expressing interest in playing with the China-based Canadian Women's Hockey League (CWHL) team, Miller was drafted in the third round, fifteenth overall in the 2018 CWHL Draft by the Shenzhen KRS Vanke Rays. She signed with the team for the 2018–19 CWHL season and finished her first professional ice hockey season tied with Emma Woods for second on the team with 10 goals and ranked fifth with 15 points in 20 games.

Following the collapse of the CWHL in 2019, Miller remained with the KRS Vanke Rays as they became the first non-Russian team to join the Zhenskaya Hockey League (ZhHL). In the 2019–20 ZhHL season, she scored 12 goals and 13 assists for 25 points in 24 games, ranking second on the team for goals and fourth for assists, and won the 2020 Russian Championship.

Miller was drafted in the 13th round, 74th overall, by PWHL Toronto in the 2023 PWHL draft. She signed a one-year contract in November 2023. During the 2023–24 season, she recorded seven goals and seven assists in 23 regular season games and one goal and two assists in five games during the Walter Cup. On June 21, 2024, she signed a one-year contract extension with Toronto. During the 2024–25 season, she recorded ten goals and 14 assists in 29 regular season games for the Sceptres. On June 16, 2025, she signed a three-year contract with the Vancouver Goldeneyes. Speaking about the move to her hometown of Vancouver, which she made as a free agent, Miller said "I’ve been playing kind of all over the place, overseas and in Toronto. So to come back and be in Vancouver and playing professionally, it’s a dream come true."

On April 18, 2026 in a game against the Seattle Torrent, Miller became the first player in PWHL history to score four points in multiple games. Her teammate Jenn Gardiner also broke a PWHL record in the same game by becoming the first player in league history to score four goals in a single game.

== International play ==
Medal record

Representing Canada

Women's ice hockey

World U18 Championship
Gold medal – first place	2014 Hungary	
Gold medal – first place	2013 Finland	

As a junior player with the Canadian national under-18 team, Miller participated in the IIHF Women's U18 World Championships in 2013 and 2014, winning a gold medal at both. At the 2013 tournament, she represented Canada alongside future Chinese national team teammate Kimberly Newell on a roster that also included future Canadian senior national team players Emily Clark, Sarah Nurse, and Sarah Potomak, among others.

Miller was officially named to the Chinese women's national team roster for the women's ice hockey tournament at the 2022 Winter Olympics on 28 January 2022. The circumstances surrounding her eligibility to play for the team were not made public, though questions were raised during the tournament regarding her continued Canadian citizenship (Chinese dual citizenship is not possible) and lack of Chinese ancestry. She scored China's first goal of the tournament, in the opening game of the preliminary round against the Czech Republic.

On March 21, 2025, Miller was named to the roster for Canada women's national ice hockey team for the 2025 Women's Ice Hockey World Championships a year after China removed all players from their roster with dual passports.

On March 31, 2025, Miller was deemed ineligible to play for Canada at the Women's World Championships by the IIHF, citing a by-law that players must not have been under contract to a club in another country for 730 days before changing which country they represent internationally. She was replaced by Sceptres teammate Julia Gosling.

== Career statistics ==
=== Regular season and playoffs ===
			Regular season					Playoffs
Season	Team	League	GP	G	A	Pts	PIM	GP	G	A	Pts	PIM
2012–13	Okanagan HA	JWHL	28	21	9	30	26	—	—	—	—	—
2013–14	Okanagan HA	JWHL	28	13	10	23	46	—	—	—	—	—
2014–15	St. Lawrence Saints	NCAA	20	4	7	11	8	—	—	—	—	—
2015–16	St. Lawrence Saints	NCAA	36	11	14	25	23	—	—	—	—	—
2016–17	St. Lawrence Saints	NCAA	36	15	33	48	30	—	—	—	—	—
2017–18	St. Lawrence Saints	NCAA	32	13	26	39	36	—	—	—	—	—
2018–19	KRS Vanke Rays	CWHL	21	10	5	15	16	—	—	—	—	—
2019–20	KRS Vanke Rays	ZhHL	24	12	13	25	8	5	2	1	3	4
2020–21	KRS Vanke Rays	ZhHL	28	17	19	36	28	2	2	2	4	0
2021–22	Djurgårdens IF	SDHL	25	12	7	19	20	—	—	—	—	—
2021–22	Shenzhen KRS	ZhHL	10	1	5	6	6	5	2	0	2	8
2022–23	Shenzhen KRS	ZhHL	32	25	23	48	56	2	1	2	3	4
2023–24	PWHL Toronto	PWHL	23	7	7	14	8	5	1	2	3	0
2024–25	Toronto Sceptres	PWHL	29	10	14	24	8	4	1	2	3	0
2025–26	Vancouver Goldeneyes	PWHL	30	7	11	18	12	—	—	—	—	—
PWHL totals			82	24	32	56	28	9	2	4	6	0

=== International ===
Year	Team	Event	Result	GP	G	A	Pts	PIM
2013	Canada	U18	1st place, gold medalist(s)	5	1	2	3	6
2014	Canada	U18	1st place, gold medalist(s)	5	1	2	3	4
2022	China	OG	9th	4	1	0	1	2
2022	China	WC D1B	1st	5	6	6	12	2
Junior totals				10	2	4	6	10
Senior totals				9	7	6	13	4
