= Kate Schipper =

American ice hockey player

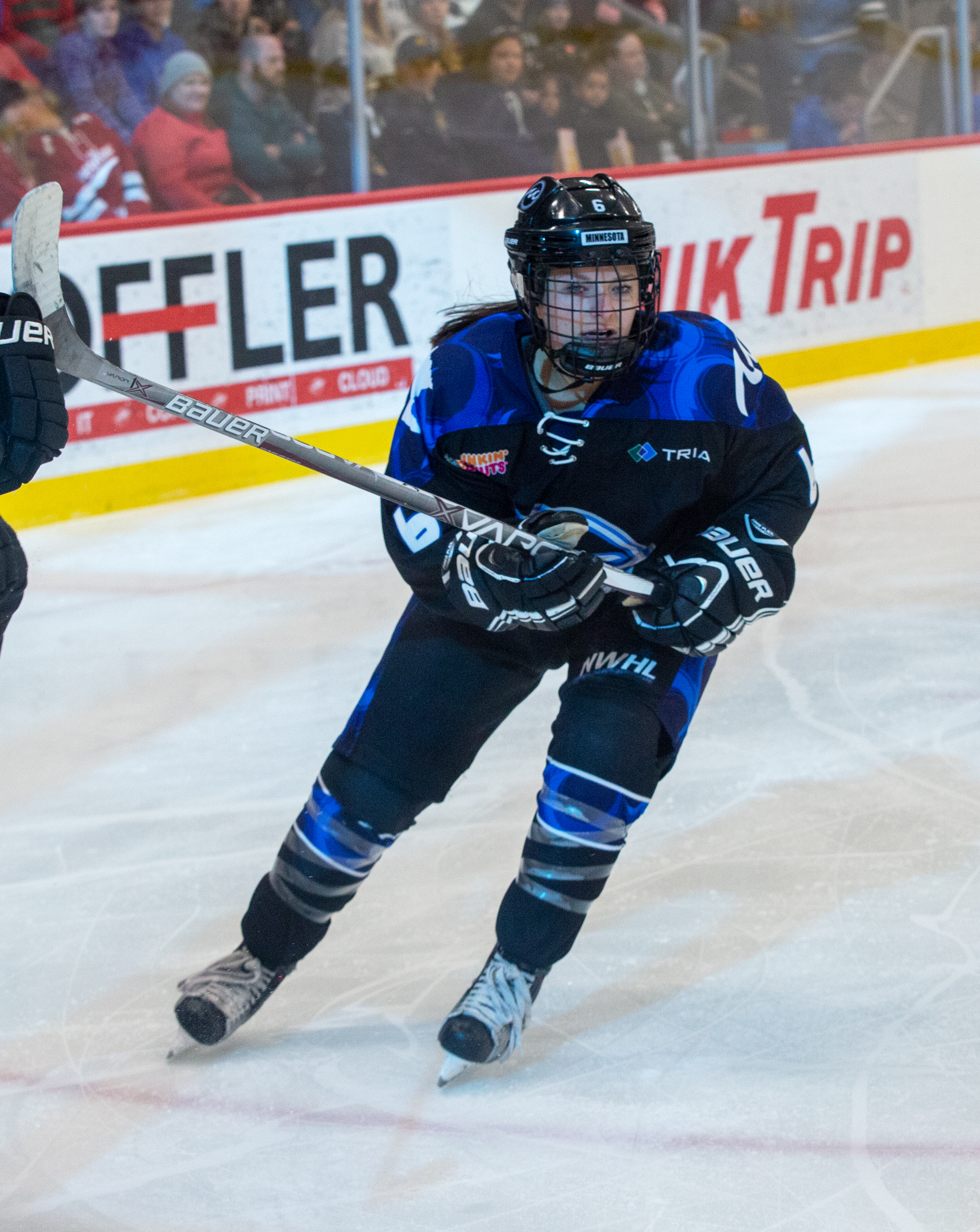
- Schipper playing for the Minnesota Whitecaps, October 2018
- Born: June 28, 1995 (age 31) Brooklyn Park, Minnesota, U.S.
- Height: 5 ft 4 in (163 cm)
- Weight: 134 lb (61 kg; 9 st 8 lb)
- Position: Forward
- Shot: Right
- Played for: Minnesota Whitecaps; Minnesota Golden Gophers
- National team: United States
- Playing career: 2013–2019

Katherine "Kate" Schipper (born June 28, 1995) is an American ice hockey forward, who most recently played with Minnesota Whitecaps of the National Women's Hockey League (NWHL) in the 2018–19 season, winning the Isobel Cup.

== Early life ==
Schipper was raised in Brooklyn Park, Minnesota, where she attended Breck School and was five-time varsity letter winner on the school's hockey team. Twice named an all-state honoree and three-time All-Tri Metro Conference awardee, Schipper led the team to a Minnesota Class A State Tournament championship in 2012, after a second-place finish in 2010 and third-place finish in 2011. Schipper played club hockey for the Minnesota Junior Whitecaps. She also was a varsity softball and soccer player. She was selected for USA Hockey development camps from 2010 to 2012.

== Career ==
=== Minnesota Golden Gophers, 2013–2017 ===
Schipper attended the University of Minnesota and played for the Minnesota Golden Gophers women's ice hockey team from 2013 to 2017. During the 2014–15 season, her 29 points in 31 games ranked fourth in the nation among rookies (7 goals–22 assists). She notched two assists in the team's 4–1 WCHA Final Face-off semifinal win over Minnesota Duluth and registered an assist in the 5–4 semifinal loss to the Clarkson Golden Knights. During her sophomore season, she appeared in all 41 games and ranked 10th on the team with 22 points (7g-15a). Schipper helped lead the Golden Gophers to NCAA Division 1 national championships in 2015 and 2016. In May 2019, she announced she would be sitting out the next season(s) in solidarity with over 200 other players pushing for long-term sustainable changes to women's ice hockey leagues in North America.

=== Minnesota Whitecaps, 2017–2019 ===
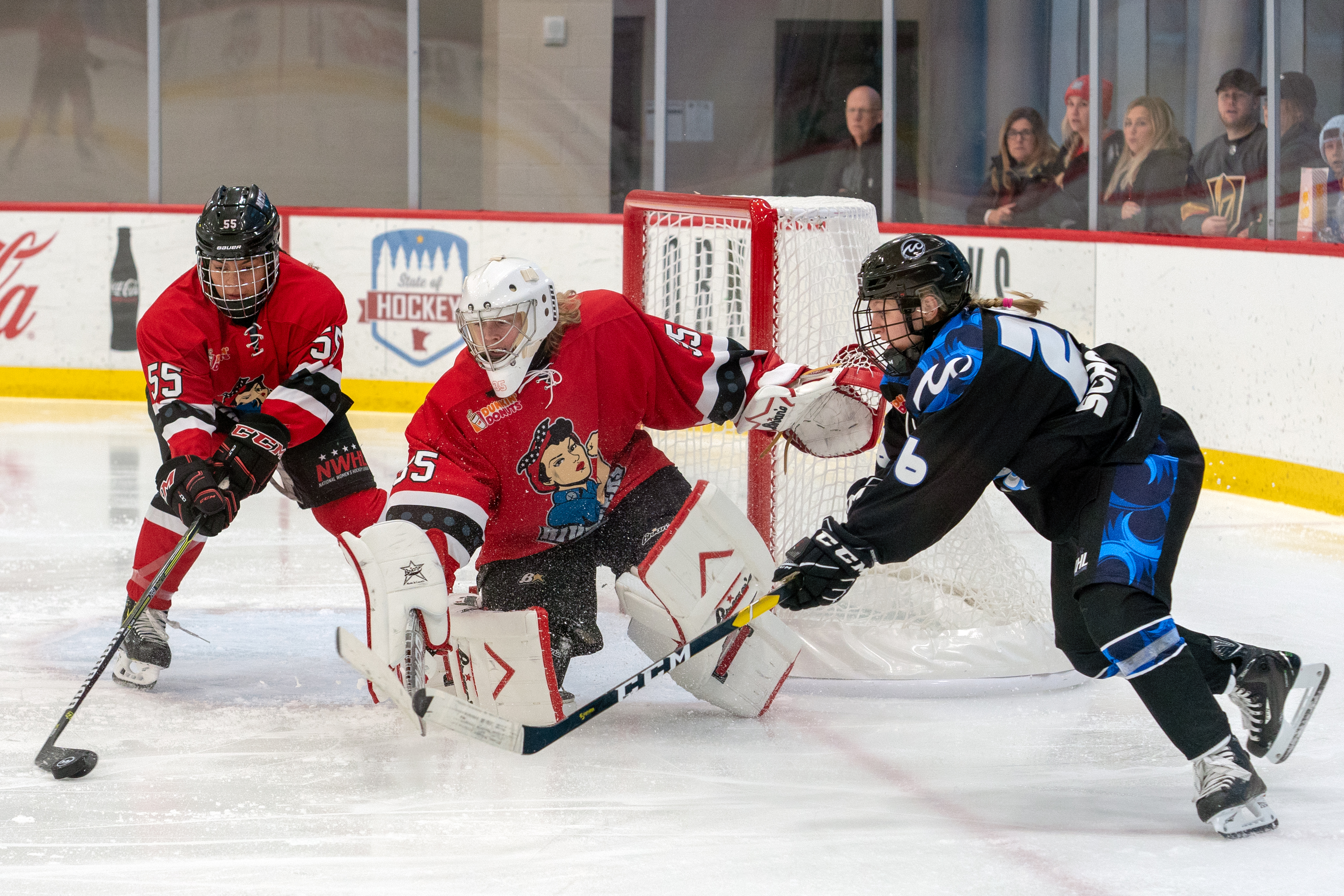
Schipper (far right) during a 3–1 win against the Metropolitan Riveters, October 2018

Schipper represented the Minnesota Whitecaps at the 3rd NWHL All-Star Game.

In 2018, Schipper signed with the Minnesota Whitecaps for the team's inaugural season in the National Women's Hockey League. During the team's first game, she scored a goal to lift the Whitecaps to an eventual 4–0 win against the Metropolitan Riveters. Shipper represented the Whitecaps for the second consecutive time at the 4th NWHL All-Star Game, playing with Team Stecklein.

The Whitecaps finished in first place during the regular season and advanced to the Playoffs. After defeating the Metropolitan Riveters 5–1 during the semifinals, the Whitecaps won the Isobel Cup in overtime against the Buffalo Beauts.

=== International ===
Schipper played for the United States national under-18 team and earned silver medals at the 2012 and 2013 IIHF U18 Women's World Championships. At the 2013 World Championships, she was named best forward and MVP.

== Career statistics ==
			Regular season					Playoffs
Season	Team	League	GP	G	A	Pts	PIM	GP	G	A	Pts	PIM
2018–19	Minnesota Whitecaps	NWHL	16	5	6	11	6	2	0	1	1	2
