= Jincy Roese =

American ice hockey player (born 1997)

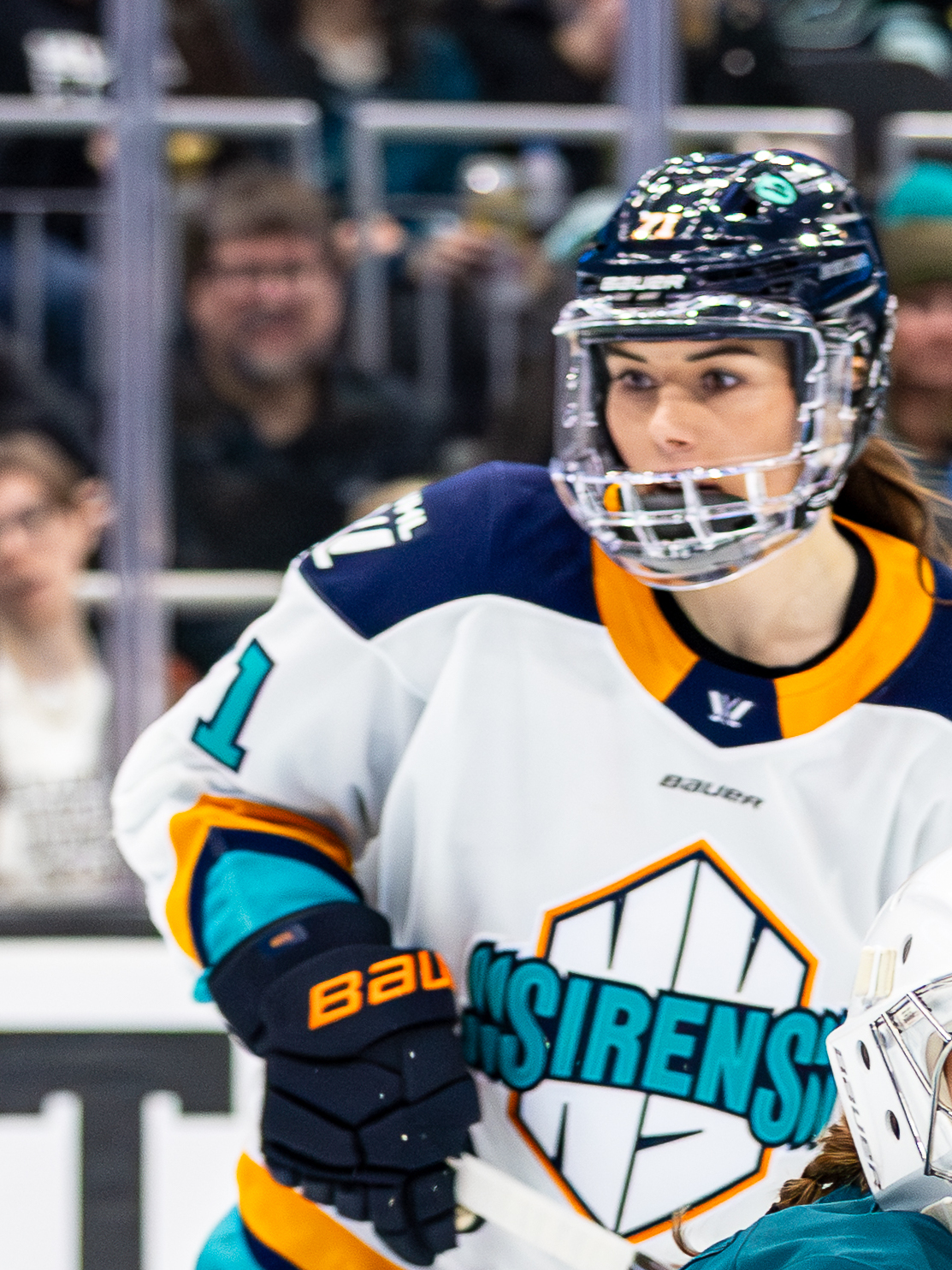
- Roese in 2025
- Born: May 15, 1997 (age 29) O'Fallon, Missouri, U.S.
- Height: 5 ft 6 in (168 cm)
- Weight: 145 lb (66 kg; 10 st 5 lb)
- Position: Defense
- Shoots: Left
- PWHL team Former teams: Minnesota Frost; Ottawa Charge; New York Sirens
- National team: United States
- Playing career: 2015–present
Medal record
Representing United States
Women's ice hockey
Olympic Games
Silver medal – second place	2022 Beijing
World Championship
Silver medal – second place	2021 Canada
Silver medal – second place	2022 Denmark
Four Nations Cup
Gold medal – first place	2012 United States
World U18 Championship
Gold medal – first place	2015 United States
Silver medal – second place	2013 Finland
Silver medal – second place	2014 Hungary

Jincy Rose Roese (née Dunne; born May 15, 1997) is an American professional ice hockey defender for the Minnesota Frost of the Professional Women's Hockey League (PWHL). She previously played for the Ottawa Charge and New York Sirens of the PWHL. She represented the United States at the 2022 Winter Olympics and won a silver medal.

== Playing career ==
Following four seasons as a member of the Ohio State University women's hockey program, Roese was drafted in the third round of the 2023 PWHL Draft by PWHL Ottawa.

In the 2024–25 season, Roese recorded three goals and 14 points in 27 games, finishing fifth in scoring by a defender.

On June 18, 2025, Roese signed a one-year contract with the New York Sirens. During the 2025–26 season, she recorded six assists in 22 games with the Sirens.

On March 30, 2026, she was traded to the Minnesota Frost in exchange for Denisa Křížová.

== International play ==
Roese made her international debut with the United States women's national ice hockey team at the 2012 4 Nations Cup, making her first appearance on November 6, 2012, against Sweden. She would play in three games as the United States claimed the gold medal. Roese was also a member of the American team at the 2013 4 Nations Cup, but did not play.

Roese was a member of the United States women's national under-18 ice hockey team and has played in three IIHF World Women's U18 Championships. At the 2013 event, she led the team with a plus 11 rating and was selected as one of Team USA's three best players by team coaches. The youngest player on Team USA, she collected the silver medal after losing to Team Canada in the final.

Preceding the 2014 Winter Olympics, Roese was a member of the 25-player preliminary roster but was cut when it had to be trimmed to 21. She would have been the youngest female hockey player to skate in the Winter Games for Team USA.

She was the only player from the state of Missouri to be on the roster for the 2014 IIHF World Women's U18 Championship, where she captained the American team. She won the directorate award for best defensemen of the tournament, and was named one of Team USA's best players.

For the 2015 IIHF World Women's U18 Championship, Roese was once again named team captain. She would score twice in the gold medal game, and earned top defender honors for the second straight year. Following the championship, on January 15, 2015, she dropped the puck in a ceremonial faceoff before a National Hockey League game between the St. Louis Blues and the Detroit Red Wings.

On January 2, 2022, Roese was named to represent the United States at the 2022 Winter Olympics.

== Personal life ==
Roese is the daughter of Tom and Tammy Dunne. She has five siblings who each play hockey. Her older sister Jessica played for Ohio State. Her younger sister Joy plays for Ohio State as well as the US national team. Her younger brother Josh plays for the Washington Capitals of the National Hockey League (NHL). Her sister Josey plays for Lindenwood University, and her brother James plays for Oklahoma State University.

On June 10, 2023, she married Isaac Roese in a private ceremony in Ohio.

Ahead of PWHL Ottawa's inaugural season, Roese was selected as the team's player representative with the PWHL Players Association, the league's labour union.

== Career statistics ==
=== Regular season and playoffs ===
			Regular season					Playoffs
Season	Team	League	GP	G	A	Pts	PIM	GP	G	A	Pts	PIM
2016–17	Ohio State University	WCHA	37	4	10	14	30	—	—	—	—	—
2017–18	Ohio State University	WCHA	39	2	24	26	8	—	—	—	—	—
2018–19	Ohio State University	WCHA	33	4	24	28	14	—	—	—	—	—
2019–20	Ohio State University	WCHA	38	7	24	31	19	—	—	—	—	—
2020–21	Team WSF	PWHPA	6	0	1	1	2	—	—	—	—	—
2022–23	Team Adidas	PWHPA	20	1	2	3	6	—	—	—	—	—
2023–24	PWHL Ottawa	PWHL	24	0	5	5	14	—	—	—	—	—
2024–25	Ottawa Charge	PWHL	27	3	11	14	14	1	0	0	0	0
2025–26	New York Sirens	PWHL	22	0	6	6	4	—	—	—	—	—
2025–26	Minnesota Frost	PWHL	4	0	1	1	0	—	—	—	—	—
PWHL totals			77	3	23	26	32	1	0	0	0	0

=== International ===
Year	Team	Event	Result	GP	G	A	Pts	PIM
2013	USA	U18	2nd place, silver medalist(s)	5	2	5	7	0
2014	USA	U18	2nd place, silver medalist(s)	5	0	3	3	0
2015	USA	U18	1st place, gold medalist(s)	5	3	5	8	0
2021	USA	WC	2nd place, silver medalist(s)	6	0	2	2	0
2022	USA	OG	2nd place, silver medalist(s)	7	0	3	3	0
2022	USA	WC	2nd place, silver medalist(s)	7	2	4	6	0
Junior totals				15	5	13	18	0
Senior totals				19	2	9	11	0

== Awards and honors ==
- Directorate Award, Best Defenseman, 2014 IIHF World Women's U18 Championship Source:
- Directorate Award, Best Defenseman, 2015 IIHF World Women's U18 Championship Source: IIHF.com
- Media All Star-Team, 2015 IIHF World Women's U18 ChampionshipSource: IIHF.com
- 2019–2020 Ohio State female athlete of the year
- 2019-20 CCM Hockey Women's Division I All-American: First Team
