= Lauren Williams (ice hockey) =

Canadian ice hockey player

- Born: September 9, 1996 (age 29) Windsor, Ontario, Canada
- Height: 5 ft 9 in (175 cm)
- Position: Defenceman
- Shot: Right
- Played for: PWHPA New England; Worcester Blades; Wisconsin Badgers
- Current PWHL coach: New York Sirens (asst.)
- Coached for: Stonehill College; Mount Royal University
- Playing career: 2018–2022

Lauren Williams (born September 9, 1996) is a Canadian professional women's ice hockey coach and former player. She is currently an assistant coach for the New York Sirens of the Professional Women's Hockey League. Prior to joining the staff of the Sirens, she coached at Stonehill College (2022–23) and Mount Royal University (2023–24).

Williams previously played 3 years in the PWHPA (2019–22) after spending one year with the Worcester Blades of the CWHL (2018–19), having been drafted first overall. She is an alumna of the Wisconsin Badgers women's ice hockey program.

== Playing career ==
Williams won a gold medal with Team Ontario Blue at the 2012 Canadian U18 National Championships.

=== University of Wisconsin ===
Williams joined the University of Wisconsin for the 2014–15 season. In her senior year, Williams was named an alternate captain.

=== CWHL ===
Williams was selected by the Worcester Blades with the first pick overall in the 2018 CWHL Draft. As the first overall pick, the Blades pre-signed her for the 2018–19 season. She was named the Blades only participant of the 4th Canadian Women's Hockey League All-Star Game.

== Career statistics ==
Season	Team	League	GP	G	A	Pts	PIM	PPG
2014–15	Wisconsin Badgers	WCHA	25	1	0	1	0	0
2015–16	Wisconsin Badgers	WCHA	38	1	4	5	8	0
2016–17	Wisconsin Badgers	WCHA	40	1	7	8	4	0
2017–18	Wisconsin Badgers	WCHA	38	3	9	12	12	0

== Awards and honours ==
- Academic All-Big Ten team (2017–18)
- WCHA All-Academic Team (2015–16, 2016–17, 2017–18)
- WCHA Scholar Athlete (2015–16, 2016–17, 2017–18)

== Personal ==
Williams majored in sociology and psychology at the University of Wisconsin. With teammate Annie Pankowski, the two volunteered with Occupaws, an organization that trains guide dogs for the visually impaired in Wisconsin and bordering states.

Awards and achievements
Preceded by Courtney Turner	CWHL first overall draft pick 2018	Succeeded by None
