= Lena Düsterhöft =

German ice hockey player

- Born: 26 August 1996 (age 29) Munich, Germany
- Height: 1.78 m (5 ft 10 in)
- Weight: 72 kg (159 lb; 11 st 5 lb)
- Position: Defense
- Shoots: Left
- DFEL team Former teams: ERC Ingolstadt: Leksands IF; Minnesota State Mavericks; ESC Planegg
- National team: Germany
- Playing career: 2011–present

Lena Düsterhöft (born 26 August 1996) is a German ice hockey player and member of the German national team. She plays in the German Women's Ice Hockey League (DFEL) with ERC Ingolstadt.

== Playing career ==
Düsterhöft began playing with the ESC Planegg team that was active in both the DFEL and Elite Women's Hockey League (EWHL) during the 2010–11 season. Over the following seasons, she continued playing with ESC Planegg while also playing with the junior teams of EHC Klostersee in the German boys' U16 and U18 national leagues.

Her college ice hockey career was played with the Minnesota State Mavericks women's ice hockey program in the Western Collegiate Hockey Association (WCHA) conference of the NCAA Division I.

== International play ==
As a member of the German national U18 team, Düsterhöft participated in the Top Division tournament of the IIHF U18 Women's World Championship in 2013 and served as team captain at the Division I tournament in 2014.

With the senior national team, she has represented Germany at the IIHF Women's World Championships in 2015, 2017, 2019, 2021, and 2022.
