= 2014–15 WCHA women's ice hockey season =

2014–15 Western Collegiate Hockey Association women's ice hockey season
- League: NCAA Division I
- Sport: Ice hockey
- Duration: September 2014 - March, 2015
- Teams: 8

Regular season
- Reg. season champs: Minnesota Golden Gophers
- Tournament: Wisconsin Badgers

Ice hockey seasons
- 13–14 15–16

The 2014–15 WCHA women's ice hockey season marked the continuation of the annual tradition of competitive ice hockey among Western Collegiate Hockey Association members.

== Regular season ==
=== News and notes ===
==== October ====
- October 3: In her NCAA debut, Emily Clark registered three points (two goals, one assist) in a 4-1 victory against the Minnesota-Duluth Bulldogs.

==== November ====
- November 1: Bemidji State defeated the top-ranked Minnesota Golden Gophers by a 1-0 tally, handing them their first loss of the season. The game-winning goal was scored by Ivana Bilic.
- November 24: The Minnesota Golden Gophers and St. Cloud State Huskies faced off in the U.S. Hockey Hall of Fame Women's Face-Off Classic. Golden Gophers freshman Kelly Pannek registered her first NCAA career hat trick as Minnesota prevailed by a 5-0 tally. Goaltender Amanda Leveille earned the shutout in a 19-save effort.

== Postseason ==
- March 7: The Bemidji State Beavers defeated the Minnesota Golden Gophers by a 1-0 tally in the semifinals of the WCHA Final Face-Off. The game-winning goal was scored by Stephanie Anderson in the third period. Beavers goaltender Brittni Mowat made 37 saves, registering her seventh shutout of the season, a new program record. In addition, it marked the first time that the Beavers advanced to the championship game of the WCHA Final Face-Off.

=== In-season honors ===
==== Players of the week ====
Week	Player of the week
October 1	Karley Sylvester, Wisconsin
October 7	Claudia Kepler, Ohio State
October 14	Becca Kohler, North Dakota
October 21	Dani Cameranesi, Minnesota
October 28	Hannah Brandt, Minnesota
November 4	Ashleigh Brykaliuk, Minnesota-Duluth
November 11	Molly Illikainen, St. Cloud State
November 18	Meghan Lorence, Minnesota
November 25	Dani Cameranesi, Minnesota
December 2	Becca Kohler, North Dakota
February 2	Emily Clark, Wisconsin
February 10	Blayre Turnbull, Wisconsin
February 17	Dani Cameranesi, Minnesota
February 24	Dani Cameranesi, Minnesota

==== Defensive players of the week ====
Week	Player of the week
October 1	Ivana Bilic, Bemidji State
October 7	Lee Stecklein, Minnesota
October 14	Ann-Renee Desbiens, Wisconsin
October 21	Audrey Hanmer, St. Cloud State; Amanda Leveille, Minnesota
October 28	Milica McMillen, Minnesota
November 4	Brittini Mowat, Bemidji State
November 11	Stacy Danczak, Ohio State
November 18	Brittini Mowat, Bemidji State
November 25	Ann-Renee Desbiens, Wisconsin
December 2	Ann-Renee Desbiens, Wisconsin; Kayla Black, Minnesota-Duluth
February 2	Shelby Amsley-Benzie, North Dakota
February 10	Ann-Renee Desbiens, Wisconsin
February 17	Shelby Amsley-Benzie, North Dakota
February 24	Shelby Amsley-Benzie, North Dakota; Julie Friend, St. Cloud State

==== Rookies of the week ====
Week	Player of the week
October 1	Annie Pankowski, Wisconsin
October 7	Emily Clark, Wisconsin
October 14	Michelle Lowenhielm, Minnesota-Duluth
October 21	Kassidy Sauve, Ohio State
October 28	Baylee Wellhausen, Wisconsin
November 4	Kassidy Sauve, Ohio State
November 11	None awarded
November 18	Annie Pankowski, Wisconsin
November 25	Kelly Pannek, Minnesota
December 2	Alexis Joyce, Bemidji State
February 2	Nicole Schammel, Minnesota-State
February 10	Lauren Spring, Ohio State
February 17	Alexis Joyce, Bemidji State
February 24	Jessica Healey, UMD Bulldogs

== Awards and honors ==
- WCHA Player of the Year: Hannah Brandt, Minnesota
- WCHA Rookie of the Year: Annie Pankowski, Wisconsin
- WCHA Coach of the Year: Jim Scanlan, Bemidji State
- WCHA Defensive Player of the Year: Rachel Ramsey, Minnesota
- WCHA Outstanding Student-Athlete of the Year: Shelby Amsley-Benzie, North Dakota
- WCHA Scoring Champion - Hannah Brandt, Minnesota
- WCHA Goaltending Champion - Shelby Amsley-Benzie, North Dakota

=== ALL-WCHA First Team ===
Player	Position	School
Shelby Amsley-Benzie	Goaltender	North Dakota
Hannah Brandt	Forward	Minnesota
Dani Cameranesi	Forward	Minnesota
Brittni Mowat	Goaltender	Bemidji State
Rachel Ramsey	Defense	Minnesota
Lee Stecklein	Defense	Minnesota
Blayre Turnbull	Forward	Wisconsin

=== ALL-WCHA Second Team ===
Player	Position	School
Brittany Ammerman	Forward	Wisconsin
Zoe Hickel	Forward	Minnesota Duluth
Milica McMillen	Defense	Minnesota
Brigette Lacquette	Defense	Minnesota Duluth
Annie Pankowski	Forward	Wisconsin

=== ALL-WCHA Third Team ===
Player	Position	School
Rachel Bona	Forward	Minnesota
Courtney Burke	Defense	Wisconsin
Ann-Renee Desbiens	Goaltender	Wisconsin
Becca Kohler	Forward	North Dakota
Halli Krzyzaniak	Defense	North Dakota
Karley Sylvester	Forward	Wisconsin

=== WCHA All-Rookie Team ===
Player	Position	School
Sydney Baldwin	Defense	Wisconsin
Emily Clark	Forward	Wisconsin
Alexis Joyce	Defense	Bemidji State
Annie Pankowski	Forward	Wisconsin
Kelly Pannek	Forward	Wisconsin
Kassidy Sauve	Goaltender	Ohio State

== See also ==
- National Collegiate Women's Ice Hockey Championship
