= Barbora Dvořáková =

Czech ice hockey player

- Born: November 15, 1995 (age 29); Ostrava, Czech Republic
- Height: 5 ft 10 in (178 cm)
- Weight: 181 lb (82 kg; 12 st 13 lb)
- Position: Goaltender
- Catches: Left
- ČSLH team: SK Karviná
- National team: Czech Republic
- Playing career: 2013–present

Barbora Dvořáková (born November 15, 1995) is a Czech ice hockey player for SK Karviná and the Czech national team.

She participated at the 2016 IIHF Women's World Championship.
