= Bernadette Karpf =

German ice hockey player

- Born: 3 July 1996 (age 28); Landshut, Germany
- Height: 1.67 m (5 ft 6 in)
- Weight: 61 kg (134 lb; 9 st 8 lb)
- Position: Centre
- Shoots: Right
- SDHL team Former teams: Leksands IF; ERC Ingolstadt; ESC Planegg
- National team: Germany
- Playing career: 2010–present

Bernadette Karpf (born 3 July 1996) is a German ice hockey player and member of the German national team, currently playing in the Swedish Women's Hockey League (SDHL) with Leksands IF Dam.

She participated at the 2015 IIHF Women's World Championship.
