= Kimberly Newell =

Canadian ice hockey player (born 1995)

- Born: October 4, 1995 (age 31) Vancouver, British Columbia, Canada
- Height: 175 cm (5 ft 9 in)
- Weight: 65 kg (143 lb; 10 st 3 lb)
- Position: Goaltender
- Catches: Left
- PWHL team Former teams: Vancouver Goldeneyes; KRS Vanke Rays Princeton Tigers
- National team: China
- Playing career: 2013–present

Zhou Jiaying
- Traditional Chinese: 周嘉鷹
- Simplified Chinese: 周嘉鹰
Transcriptions
Standard Mandarin
- Hanyu Pinyin: Zhōu Jiāyīng
Yue: Cantonese
- Yale Romanization: Jāu Gāyīng

Kimberly Jessica Newell (born October 4, 1995), also known by the Chinese name Zhou Jiaying (Chinese: 周嘉鹰), is a Canadian ice hockey player and member of the Chinese national ice hockey team. She most recently played in the 2021–22 season of the Zhenskaya Hockey League (ZhHL) with the KRS Vanke Rays.

Newell represented China in the women's ice hockey tournament at the 2022 Winter Olympics in Beijing.

As of the 2025–26 season, Newell is a goalie for the Vancouver Goldeneyes of the Professional Women's Hockey League (PWHL), but does not currently have any playing time.

== Early life and education ==
Newell was born on October 4, 1995, in Vancouver, Canada. Newell's mother, who is from China, and her father, who is from Salmon Arm, British Columbia, met at the University of British Columbia while they were both studying electrical engineering.

Newell holds a bachelor's degree in economics and finance from Princeton University. At Princeton, Newell spent three years taking Mandarin Chinese courses to be able to communicate with her maternal grandfather. Newell's paternal grandmother played field hockey in her native Germany.

== International career ==
Medal record

Representing Canada

Women's U18 ice hockey

World U18 Championship
Gold medal – first place	2013 Finland	

As a junior player with the Canadian national under-18 team, Newell won a gold medal at the IIHF Women's U18 World Championships in 2013, where she represented Canada alongside future Chinese national team teammate Hannah Miller on a roster that also included future Canadian senior national team players Emily Clark, Sarah Nurse, and Sarah Potomak, among others. In net for three of Canada's five games, Newell maintained an excellent 1.00 goals against average and recorded the tournament's best save percentage at .960, earning selection to the tournament's All-Star team.

Newell was officially named to the Chinese women's national team roster for the women's ice hockey tournament at the 2022 Winter Olympics on 28 January 2022. She was one of several players on the team with Canadian or American citizenship. During a post-match Olympics press briefing, Newell was not allowed to speak English to international reporters despite it being her native language. Instead, she used a translator.

Newell had the best save percentage at the 2022 Winter Olympics (95.5%).

== Personal life ==
Following her 2016 graduation, Newell worked in finance for Credit Suisse in New York City for two years until being recruited to play for the KRS Vanke Rays in 2018.

== Career statistics ==
=== International ===
Note: GP = Games played; Min, TOI = Minutes played; W = Wins; L = Losses; T,T/OT = Ties; OTL = Overtime losses; GA = Goals-against; GAA = Goals-against average; SO = Shutouts; SV% = Save percentage;

				Regular season
Year	Team	Event	Result	GP	W	L	T/OT	MIN	GA	SO	GAA	SV%
2022	China	OG	9th	3	2	1	0	182:46	4	0	1.31	0.955
