= Catherine Daoust =

Canadian ice hockey defender

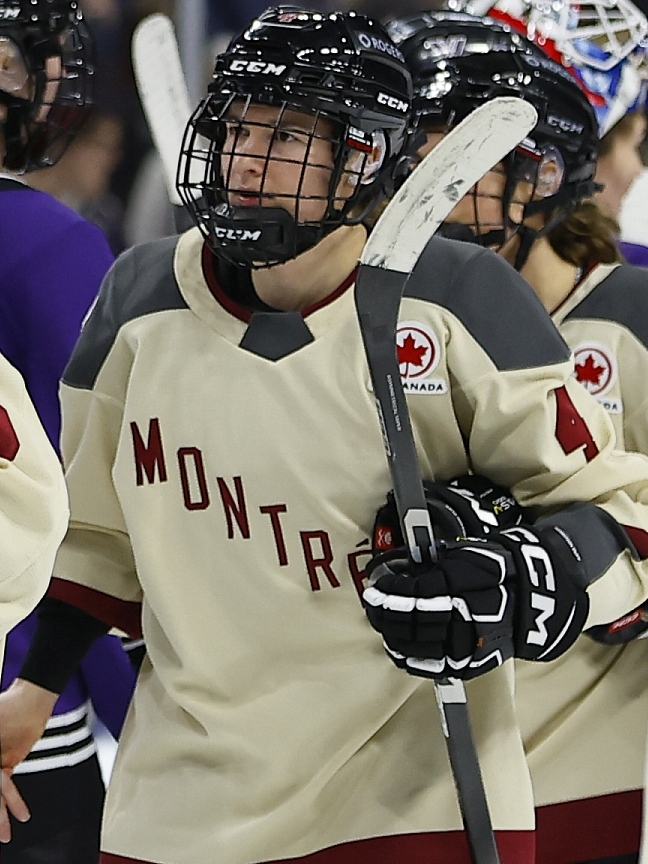
- Daoust with PWHL Montreal in 2024
- Born: February 21, 1995 (age 30); L'Île-Bizard, Quebec, Canada
- Height: 165 cm (5 ft 5 in)
- Position: Defence
- Shoots: Right
- PWHL team Former teams: Montreal Victoire: Montreal Force; PWHPA Montréal; Les Canadiennes de Montréal; Minnesota Duluth Bulldogs
- National team: Canada
- Playing career: 2014–present

Catherine Daoust is a Canadian professional ice hockey defender for the Montreal Victoire of the Professional Women's Hockey League (PWHL).

== Career ==
Daoust won a $1,500 scholarship from the NHL's Montreal Canadiens in 2013.

From 2014 to 2018, Daoust played and studied at the University of Minnesota Duluth, putting up 37 points in 140 NCAA games. She was named to the WCHA All-Academic Team in both 2016 and 2017, and served as an assistant captain for Minnesota-Duluth in her senior year.

She was drafted 28th overall by Les Canadiennes de Montréal in the 2018 CWHL Draft. After graduating, she signed her first professional contract with the club, scoring 5 points in 27 games in her rookie CWHL season. She scored her first goal in her second game, a 9–0 victory over the Worcester Blades.

After the collapse of the CWHL in May 2019, she joined the PWHPA. She played for Team Knox at the Unifor Showcase in September 2019.

In 2022, Daoust signed with Montreal Force in the PHF and spent one season with the team, before the PHF was bought out to form the PWHL. In 2023, she attended a training camp for PWHL Montreal and was named to the main roster after a successful try-out.

=== International ===
She represented Team Canada at the 2013 IIHF World Women's U18 Championship, scoring 3 points in 5 games as the country won gold.

== Personal life ==
Daoust attended Cégep de Saint-Laurent. She has a bachelor's degree in mechanical engineering. Her boyfriend has launched the Until She’s Paid platform, aiming to profile women's hockey players and to petition the NHL to fund women's hockey.
