= Isabell Palm =

Swedish ice hockey player

- Born: 13 October 1995 (age 29); Skellefteå, Sweden
- Height: 1.78 m (5 ft 10 in)
- Weight: 69 kg (152 lb; 10 st 12 lb)
- Position: Forward
- Shoots: Left
- NDHL team Former teams: Skellefteå AIK: HV71; Linköping HC; MODO Hockey
- National team: Sweden
- Playing career: 2012–present

Isabell Palm (born 13 October 1995) is a Swedish ice hockey player, currently playing in the Nationella Damhockeyligan (NDHL) with Skellefteå AIK. Known for her physical style of play, she holds both the single-season and all-time records for penalty minutes in the Swedish Women's Hockey League (SDHL) and was the first player in league history to reach 400 career penalty minutes.

== Playing career ==
Palm grew up in the Clemensnäs district of Skellefteå, in northern Sweden. She played on boys' teams until she turned fifteen, when she signed with MODO Hockey in Riksserien (renamed SDHL in 2016). She won the Riksserien championship with the club in her rookie season.

In 2017, she left MODO to sign with HV71. She passed Emma Eliasson to become the most penalised player in league history in the 2017–18 season. She received a four-game suspension in January 2018 for a hit to the head in a match against Luleå HF/MSSK.

After two seasons with HV71, she signed with Linköping HC.

=== International ===
She was part of the Swedish national team that participated in the 2019 IIHF Women's World Championship.
