= Catherine Dubois =

Canadian ice hockey player (born 1995)

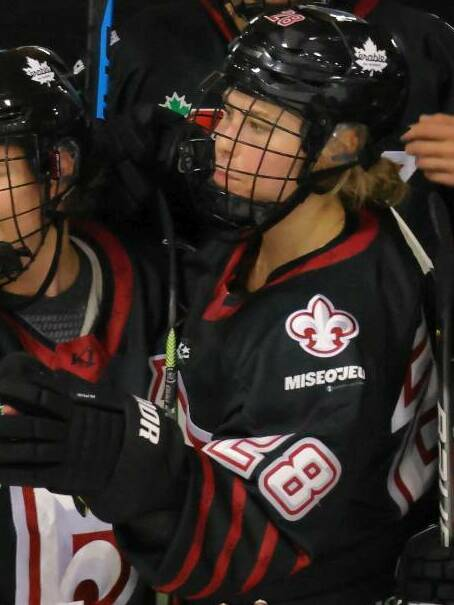
- Dubois with the Montreal Force in 2022
- Born: July 29, 1995 (age 30) Quebec City, Quebec, Canada
- Height: 175 cm (5 ft 9 in)
- Position: Forward
- Shoots: Left
- PWHL team Former teams: Montreal Victoire: Montreal Force; Montréal Carabins
- National team: Canada
- Playing career: 2015–present

Catherine Dubois (born July 29, 1995) is a Canadian ice hockey forward, currently signed with the Montreal Victoire of the Professional Women's Hockey League (PWHL). She was the first Montréal Carabins player to be invited to a senior Canadian national team camp.

== Career ==
Dubois played on boy's teams until the age of 15. In Cégep, she played for the Cégep Limoilou Titans, where she won a scholarship from the Fondation de l’athlète d’excellence du Québec for being a potential Olympic athlete.

After graduating, she studied at the Université de Montréal, playing for the school's Montreal Carabins women's ice hockey program, turning down multiple offers from NCAA programs. Across 94 U Sports games, she scored 62 points. After being hospitalised and missing parts of the 2016–17 season due to kidney failure, she planned to retire from hockey, but decided to return after the end of the summer. In February 2018, she scored the game-winning goal in overtime to send the Carabins to the provincial finals against Concordia.

She was named to the roster for the Montréal section of the PWHPA in October 2020.

On June 19, 2025, she signed a one-year contract extension with the Montreal Victoire. In two seasons with the Victoire, she recorded eight goals and seven assists in 45 games.

=== International ===
Dubois represented Canada at the 2012 and 2013 IIHF World Women's U18 Championship, scoring a total of 12 points in 10 games as the country won gold both times. She scored 6 points in 5 games for Canada at the 2017 Winter Universiade, winning silver.

== Personal life ==
She has a bachelor's degree in Arts & Sciences. Her father, Stéphane Dubois, played for the Granby Bisons in the QMJHL. She is a member of the LGBTQ community.

== Career statistics ==
=== Regular season and playoffs ===
			Regular season					Playoffs
Season	Team	League	GP	G	A	Pts	PIM	GP	G	A	Pts	PIM
2020–21	Montréal	PWHPA	4	1	1	2	8	—	—	—	—	—
2021–22	Montréal	PWHPA	6	2	2	4	4	—	—	—	—	—
2022–23	Montréal Force	PHF	24	2	4	6	10	—	—	—	—	—
2023–24	PWHL Montréal	PWHL	21	2	4	6	12	3	0	0	0	2
2024–25	Montréal Victoire	PWHL	24	6	3	9	27	4	1	0	1	0
2025–26	Montréal Victoire	PWHL	24	4	1	5	6	9	1	0	1	4
PWHL totals			59	12	8	20	45	16	2	0	2	6
PHF totals			24	2	4	6	10	0	0	0	0	0

== Awards and honours ==
Honours	Year
PWHL
Walter Cup champion	2026
