= Sarah Nurse =

Canadian ice hockey player (born 1995)

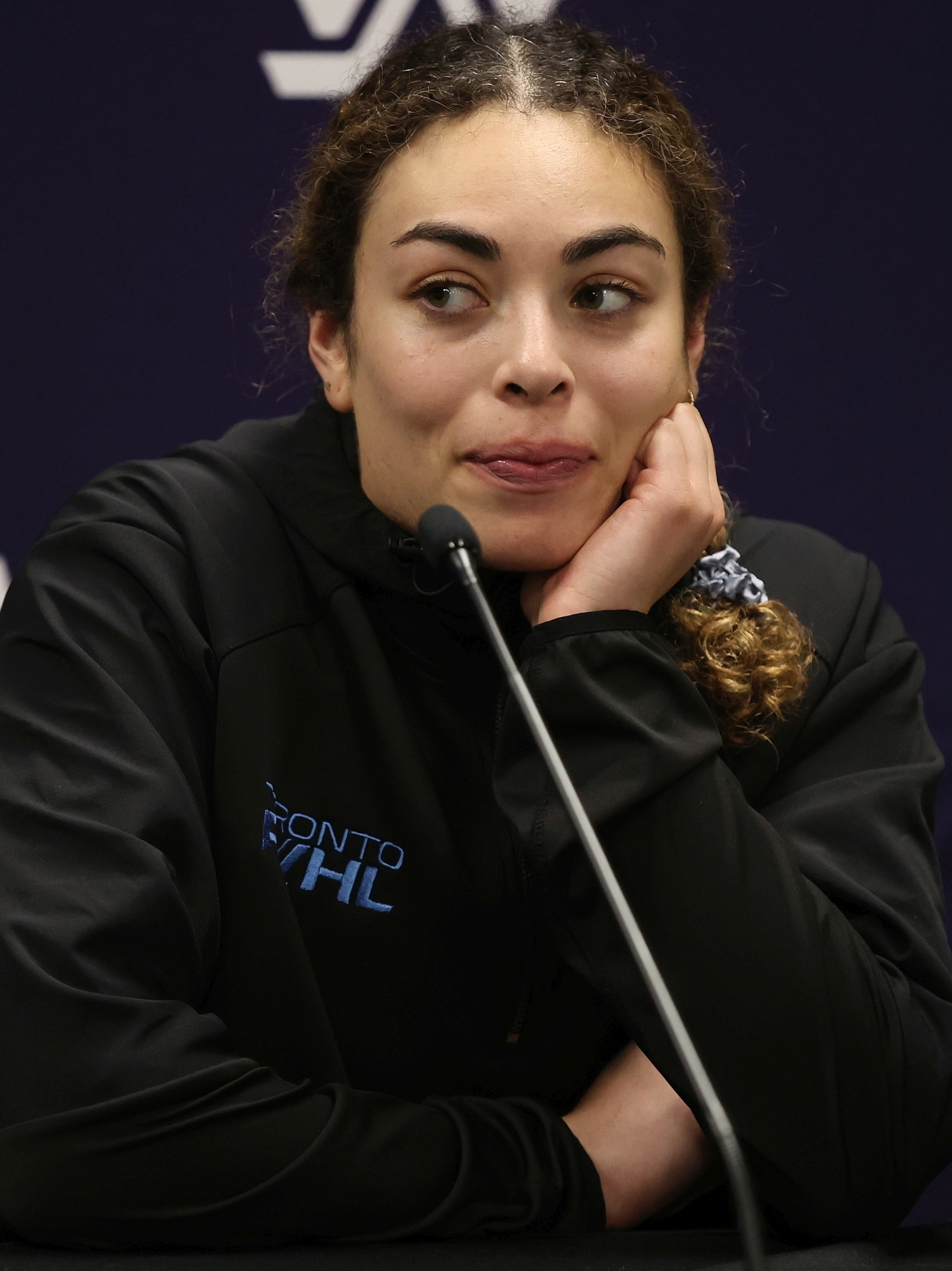
- Nurse with PWHL Toronto in 2024
- Born: January 4, 1995 (age 31) Burlington, Ontario, Canada
- Height: 5 ft 9 in (175 cm)
- Weight: 148 lb (67 kg; 10 st 8 lb)
- Position: Forward
- Shoots: Left
- PWHL team Former teams: Vancouver Goldeneyes; Toronto Sceptres; Toronto Furies
- National team: Canada
- Playing career: 2015–present
Medal record
Women's ice hockey
Representing Canada
Olympic Games
Gold medal – first place	2022 Beijing	Team
Silver medal – second place	2018 Pyeongchang	Team
Silver medal – second place	2026 Milano Cortina	Team
World Championships
Gold medal – first place	2021 Canada
Gold medal – first place	2022 Denmark
Gold medal – first place	2024 United States
Silver medal – second place	2023 Canada
Silver medal – second place	2025 Czechia
Bronze medal – third place	2019 Finland
World U18 Championships
Gold medal – first place	2013 Finland

Sarah Nurse (born January 4, 1995) is a Canadian professional ice hockey player and alternate captain for the Vancouver Goldeneyes of the Professional Women's Hockey League (PWHL) and Canada women's national ice hockey team. Nurse won Olympic gold at the 2022 Winter Olympics—where she broke the single-tournament Olympic point record with 18 and became the first Black woman to win a gold medal in Olympic ice-hockey—and silver at the 2018 Winter Olympics. She has competed in six IIHF World Women's Championships, securing three golds (2021, 2022, 2024), two silvers (2023, 2025), and one bronze (2019).

After a standout college career with the Wisconsin Badgers, featuring four Frozen Four appearances, she played one season with the Toronto Furies of the Canadian Women's Hockey League (CWHL). Nurse co-founded the Professional Women's Hockey Players Association (PWHPA), serving on its board, and later joined the PWHL's executive committee for the PWHL Players Association (PWHLPA) upon the PWHL's 2023 launch.

== Early life ==
Nurse was born in Burlington and raised in Hamilton, Ontario. She is the eldest of three children born to Michelle and Roger Nurse. Nurse began skating at age three and started playing hockey at age five. At seven years old, she watched the Canadian women's hockey team, led by Hayley Wickenheiser, win gold at the 2002 Winter Olympics in Salt Lake City, and told her family she would one day play in the Olympics herself.

Nurse grew up in one of Hamilton's most accomplished athletic families. Her father immigrated to Canada from Trinidad and became a national-level lacrosse player before working as a teacher and coach. Her uncle Richard Nurse played wide receiver for the Hamilton Tiger-Cats of the Canadian Football League, and her aunt Raquel-Ann Nurse McNabb played basketball at Syracuse University before marrying former Philadelphia Eagles quarterback Donovan McNabb. Her cousins include Darnell Nurse, a defenseman for the San Jose Sharks of the NHL, and Kia Nurse, a three-time Olympian and WNBA All-Star. Her younger brothers, Isaac and Elijah, also pursued hockey; Isaac played for the Hamilton Bulldogs of the Ontario Hockey League.

Nurse began playing organized hockey in the Hamilton City Hub League before progressing to teams in Ancaster and Stoney Creek. She won a silver medal with Stoney Creek at the Ontario Women's Hockey Association (OWHA) provincials. She also won a bronze medal in high school at the 2010 OFSAA championships and a silver at OFSAA 2011. In 2010, she played with Team Heaney and reached the quarter-finals of the 2010 Ontario Winter Games.

During the 2010–11 Provincial Women's Hockey League season, she led the Stoney Creek Jr. Sabres in scoring. She was named to the OWHA All-Star Team for a game vs. Team Ontario Under-18. For the 2011–12 PWHL season, she was named an alternate captain with Stoney Creek. She helped the club win a bronze medal at the PWHL championships. She ranked second on the club in Stoney Creek scoring. With the Stoney Creek Jr. Sabres of the PWHL, she broke the league record shared by Kelly Sabatine and Thea Imbrogno for most goals in a season. Breaking the mark in the 2012–13 season, Nurse scored 35 goals, highlighted by a hat-trick in the season's final game.

== Playing career ==
=== Wisconsin Badgers, 2013–2017 ===
Nurse played NCAA Division hockey with the Wisconsin Badgers of the Western Collegiate Hockey Association (WCHA).

In the 2015 WCHA Final Faceoff championship game, Nurse scored twice, including the game-winning goal against Bemidji State.

An 8–2 win on December 4, 2016, against the Badgers’ archrivals the Minnesota Golden Gophers, provided Nurse with a career milestone. Playing in front of a sellout crowd at LaBahn Arena, Nurse scored three goals, becoming the first player in program history to score a hat-trick against Minnesota.

=== Toronto Furies, 2018–2019 ===
After competing at the 2018 Winter Olympics, Nurse was drafted second overall by the Toronto Furies in the 2018 CWHL Draft. On October 17, 2018, Nurse scored her first CWHL goal in a Furies match at MasterCard Centre versus the visiting Shenzhen KRS Vanke Rays. Breaking a 1–1 tie on the power play at the 8:54 mark of the third, the goal stood as the game-winning tally in a 3–1 final.

=== Professional Women's Hockey Players Association (PWHPA), 2019–2023 ===
Nurse was among the over 200 women's hockey players who on May 2, 2019, announced via coordinated social media posts that they would boycott existing North American professional leagues for the 2019–20 season as part of the #ForTheGame movement. On May 20, 2019, the group formed the Professional Women's Hockey Players Association (PWHPA) as a non-profit organization, with Nurse serving as a board member.

Skating for Team Sonnet (Toronto), Nurse participated in the PWHPA's "Dream Gap Tour" exhibition series, including the inaugural Toronto showcase in 2019 and subsequent events across Canada and the United States. She competed in the 2021 Secret Cup, the Canadian leg of the 2020–21 PWHPA Dream Gap Tour, logging a goal and an assist in a 4–2 championship game loss versus Team Bauer (Montreal).

Nurse continued with Team Sonnet through the 2021–22 and 2022–23 seasons, participating in showcase games and skills competitions. In May 2022, the PWHPA signed a letter of intent with Billie Jean King Enterprises and the Mark Walter Group to explore a new professional league. She served on the PWHPA's bargaining committee alongside Kendall Coyne Schofield, Brianne Jenner, Hilary Knight, and Liz Knox, helping negotiate the collective bargaining agreement ratified in July 2023 that paved the way for the PWHL.

=== Toronto Sceptres, 2023–2025 ===
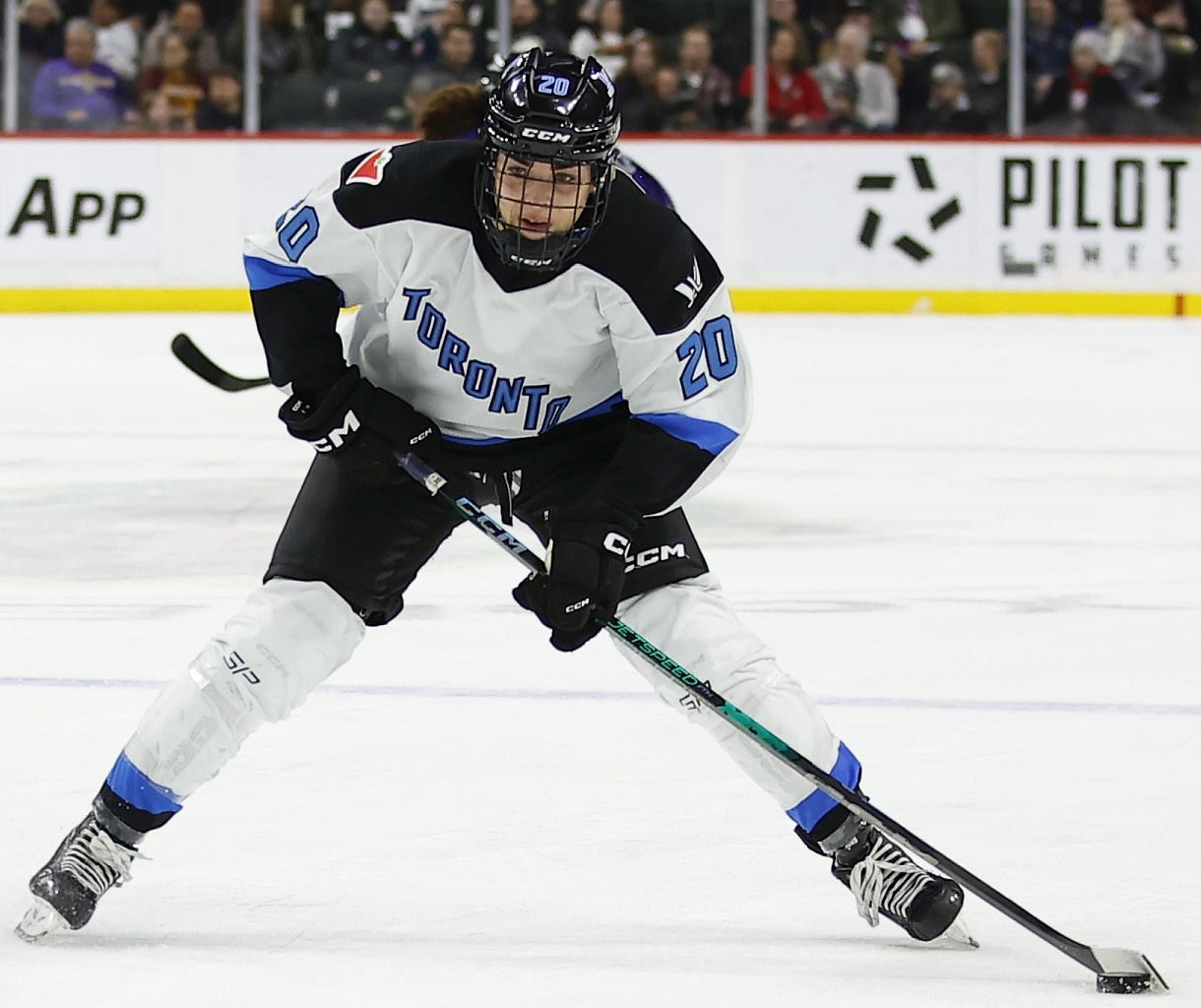
Nurse playing for Toronto in 2024

Following the launch of the new Professional Women's Hockey League (PWHL), Nurse was one of three players, alongside fellow Canadian Olympians Blayre Turnbull and Renata Fast, signed within a pre-draft period by PWHL Toronto. During the 2023–24 season, Nurse played in all 24 regular season games, recording 11 goals and 12 assists for 23 points, which tied for second in the league. Toronto finished first overall in the inaugural season standings, powered by an 11-game winning streak. Nurse recorded her first PWHL hat trick in a 6–2 win over New York late in the season, which earned her recognition as one of the league's three Stars of the Week. On April 20, 2024, Nurse scored twice, including the overtime winner 13 seconds into the extra period, as Toronto defeated Montréal 3–2 before a then-world-record crowd of 21,105 at the Bell Centre; she was named the game's first star. Nurse was named to the PWHL Second All-Star Team. In the 2024 PWHL playoffs, Toronto selected Minnesota as their semifinal opponent by virtue of their first-place finish. The Sceptres won the first two games without conceding a goal, but lost the next three after leading scorer Natalie Spooner was injured in Game 3, and were eliminated from Walter Cup contention.

During the 2024–25 season, Nurse recorded six goals and eight assists in 21 regular season games. She scored the equalizer in Toronto's 3–1 season-opening win over the Boston Fleet on November 30, 2024. Later that week against Ottawa, Nurse scored the first shorthanded Jailbreak goal of the season — a rule unique to the PWHL in which a shorthanded goal ends the penalty — to free a teammate from the box. On January 25, 2025, she scored the go-ahead power-play goal in a 4–2 victory over the New York Sirens before 19,102 fans at Scotiabank Arena in the second annual "Battle on Bay Street" showcase game. Toronto finished second in the standings and faced Minnesota again in the playoffs, losing the best-of-five semifinal series 3–1.

=== Vancouver Goldeneyes, 2025–present ===
During the league's expansion to eight teams ahead of the 2025–26 season, Nurse was left unprotected by the Sceptres and signed a one-year contract with the Vancouver Goldeneyes on June 5, 2025. On November 21, 2025, the Goldeneyes named Nurse as one of their alternate captains. The same day, Nurse scored the Goldeneyes' first-ever goal during the team's 4–3 overtime win over the Seattle Torrent in front of a sold-out crowd of 14,958 at the Pacific Coliseum. Shortly after, Nurse suffered an upper-body injury and was placed on long-term injured reserve (LTIR) on December 5, retroactive to the date of the opener. Nurse was activated from LTIR on January 15 and returned to the lineup the following day in the third annual "Battle on Bay Street" against the Toronto Sceptres at Scotiabank Arena, scoring Vancouver's lone goal in a 2–1 overtime loss against her former team. Five days later, Nurse scored twice in a 5–0 shutout over Toronto at Pacific Coliseum; her goal at 13:42 came just 11 seconds after a goal by Tereza Vanišová, setting a new league record for the fastest two goals by one team.

== International play ==
=== Junior ===
Nurse was a member of Team Ontario blue that competed at the 2011 and 2012 National Women's Under-18 Championship, winning gold in 2011 and a bronze in 2012. She was a member of the Canadian team that captured gold at the 2013 IIHF World Women's U18 Championship.

At the 2015 4 Nations Cup, Nurse was a member of Canada's U22/Development Team, winning a gold medal. She contributed two assists in a 4–1 win over Finland on January 3, 2015.

=== Senior ===
==== World Championships ====
Nurse has appeared in six IIHF Women's World Championships, winning three gold medals (2021, 2022, 2024), two silver medals (2023, 2025), and one bronze medal (2019). She made her senior IIHF Women's World Championship debut at the 2019 IIHF Women's World Championship in Espoo, Finland, finishing third on the team with eight points as Canada claimed the bronze medal. After the 2020 tournament was cancelled due to the COVID-19 pandemic, Nurse contributed a goal and two assists as Canada won the 2021 IIHF Women's World Championship, the country's first world title in nearly a decade. She helped Canada repeat as world champions at the 2022 IIHF Women's World Championship.

At the 2023 IIHF Women's World Championship in Brampton, Ontario, Nurse tied for second on the team in scoring. In the quarterfinals against Sweden, she scored twice, including the overtime winner 4:26 into extra time to give Canada a 3–2 victory after Sweden tied the game with 9.2 seconds remaining in regulation — the first time in Women's Worlds history that a team other than the United States had taken Canada to overtime. Canada went on to lose the gold medal game 6–3 to the United States, finishing with silver.

Nurse was part of Canada's gold medal-winning team at the 2024 IIHF Women's World Championship in Utica, New York. She won silver at the 2025 IIHF Women's World Championship in České Budějovice, Czech Republic, where the United States defeated Canada 4–3 in overtime in the gold medal game.

==== Olympics ====
Nurse was selected to compete for Team Canada in the 2018 Winter Olympics in PyeongChang, South Korea. She scored her first Olympic goal in a 2–1 victory over the United States on February 14. She helped Team Canada take home a silver medal after losing in the championship game shootout against the United States.

External videos
- Sarah Nurse's powerful goals at Beijing 2022, Olympics

On January 11, 2022, Nurse was named to Canada's 2022 Olympic team. In Beijing, she set two new Olympic records for most points (18) and most assists (13) in a single women's tournament. She scored the opening goal of the gold medal game against the United States and added an assist on Marie-Philip Poulin's eventual game-winning goal in Canada's 3–2 victory. Nurse became the first Black woman to win an Olympic gold medal in ice hockey. She was named Best Forward at the tournament.

On January 9, 2026, she was named to Canada's roster to compete at the 2026 Winter Olympics.

==== Other ====
In 2020, Nurse participated for Team Canada in the Elite Women's 3-on-3 game at the Skills Competition of the 2020 National Hockey League All-Star Game.

== Personal life ==
External videos
- Sarah Nurse’s home base is spending time at grandma’s house: Family Album by Sobeys, CBC Sports

Nurse began skating when she was three years old and playing hockey when she was five. Her cousins are professional hockey player Darnell Nurse of the San Jose Sharks in the NHL and basketball player Kia Nurse of the Toronto Tempo in the WNBA. Her uncles were also involved in athletics; her uncle Donovan McNabb played professional football in the National Football League (NFL) as a quarterback, and her other uncle, Richard Nurse, was a wide receiver for the Hamilton Tiger-Cats of the Canadian Football League (CFL).

Nurse, the biracial daughter of a black Trinidadian father and a white mother, has spoken at length about racism in ice hockey. When a student wore a costume depicting Barack Obama being lynched to a Badgers football game in 2016, Nurse posted a statement condemning not just the student, but a culture of racism in student athletics at the University of Wisconsin. In the wake of the George Floyd protests in the summer of 2020, Nurse spoke with Caroline Cameron of Sportsnet, urging Canadians not to separate themselves from the racism of the United States, citing the discrimination against Viola Desmond. Nurse told The Canadian Press in November that her social media commentary on racial equality left her "flooded with interview requests". In September 2020, Liz Knox resigned her position on the PWHPA board to allow Nurse to take her place, citing the association's "blind spot" with regards to race issues in ice hockey. After the foundation of the PWHL in 2023, Nurse was named to the executive committee for the PWHLPA, the league's labour union.

== In popular culture ==
External videos
- Sarah Nurse on achieving excellence, Olympic experiences, and legacy in hockey, CBC Sports

In November 2020, Mattel and Tim Hortons collaborated on two limited-edition Barbie dolls based on Nurse and fellow hockey player Marie-Philip Poulin. The dolls were created as part of Barbie's You Can Be Anything program, which aims to inspire "girls to reach their limitless potential through imaginative play and engaging with meaningful role models." Nurse was featured on the June 2021 cover of Elle Canada along with Hanna Bunton and Brigette Lacquette. Nurse appeared as a guest judge in an episode of the third season of Canada's Drag Race, which aired in summer 2022. Also in 2022, Nurse became the first woman to appear on the cover of an EA Sports NHL title with NHL 23, appearing alongside Trevor Zegras.

Nurse appeared in Ice Queens (2023), a documentary about the history of Black women in ice hockey.

In 2026, Nurse was featured in The Inaugural Season of the PWHL, a documentary produced by Hello Sunshine and Reese Witherspoon as part of The Rise documentary series chronicling the growth of women's sports. The film, directed by Patty Ivins Specht follows the historic inaugural 2024 season of the PWHL and premiered on Peacock.

== Career statistics ==
=== Regular season and playoffs ===
			Regular season					Playoffs
Season	Team	League	GP	G	A	Pts	PIM	GP	G	A	Pts	PIM
2009–10	Stoney Creek Jr. Sabres	OWHL	4	1	0	1	4	1	0	0	0	0
2010–11	Stoney Creek Jr. Sabres	OWHL	36	18	13	31	12	6	3	1	4	0
2011–12	Stoney Creek Jr. Sabres	OWHL	30	21	16	37	21	8	3	2	5	4
2012–13	Stoney Creek Jr. Sabres	OWHL	35	36	20	56	26	8	6	8	14	8
2013–14	University of Wisconsin	WCHA	38	11	10	21	2	—	—	—	—	—
2014–15	University of Wisconsin	WCHA	37	15	10	25	10	—	—	—	—	—
2015–16	University of Wisconsin	WCHA	36	25	13	38	10	—	—	—	—	—
2016–17	University of Wisconsin	WCHA	39	25	28	53	26	—	—	—	—	—
2018–19	Toronto Furies	CWHL	26	14	12	26	16	3	1	0	1	0
2019–20	GTA West	PWHPA	—	—	—	—	—	—	—	—	—	—
2020–21	Toronto	PWHPA	4	1	4	5	6	—	—	—	—	—
2022–23	Team Adidas	PWHPA	20	7	7	14	4	—	—	—	—	—
2023–24	PWHL Toronto	PWHL	24	11	12	23	14	5	0	1	1	4
2024–25	Toronto Sceptres	PWHL	21	6	8	14	8	4	0	1	1	0
2025–26	Vancouver Goldeneyes	PWHL	19	9	6	15	10	—	—	—	—	—
CWHL totals			26	14	12	26	16	3	1	0	1	0
PWHPA totals			24	8	11	19	10	—	—	—	—	—
PWHL totals			64	26	26	52	32	9	0	2	2	4

=== International ===
Year	Team	Event	Result	GP	G	A	Pts	PIM
2013	Canada	U18	2nd place, silver medalist(s)	5	1	0	1	0
2018	Canada	OG	2nd place, silver medalist(s)	5	1	0	1	4
2019	Canada	WC	3rd place, bronze medalist(s)	7	2	6	8	2
2021	Canada	WC	1st place, gold medalist(s)	7	1	2	3	2
2022	Canada	OG	1st place, gold medalist(s)	7	5	13	18	4
2022	Canada	WC	1st place, gold medalist(s)	7	2	2	4	8
2023	Canada	WC	2nd place, silver medalist(s)	7	4	4	8	6
2024	Canada	WC	1st place, gold medalist(s)	7	1	3	4	2
2025	Canada	WC	2nd place, silver medalist(s)	7	1	3	4	6
2026	Canada	OG	2nd place, silver medalist(s)	7	0	2	2	2
Junior totals				5	1	0	1	0
Senior totals				61	17	35	52	36

== Awards and honours ==
=== NCAA ===
- All-WCHA Rookie Team (2013–14)
- 2015 WCHA Frozen Face-Off Most Outstanding Player
- WCHA All-Tournament Team (2015)
- All-WCHA Third Team (2015–16)
- Second-Team All-American (2016–17)
- WCHA 20th Anniversary Team

=== PWHL ===
- PWHL All-Second team (2023–24)

=== IIHF and Olympics ===
- 2022 Olympic Best Forward
- 2022 Olympic All-Star Team

=== Other ===
- EA Sports NHL cover athlete (2023)

== See also ==
- Black players in ice hockey
