= 2012 IIHF U18 Women's World Championship =

Tournament details
- Host country: Czech Republic
- Venue(s): PSG Arena, Zimní stadion Přerov (in 2 host cities)
- Dates: 31 December 2011 – 7 January 2012
- Teams: 8

Final positions
- Champions: Canada (2nd title)
- Runners-up: United States
- Third place: Sweden
- Fourth place: Germany

Tournament statistics
- Games played: 22
- Goals scored: 145 (6.59 per game)
- Attendance: 17,480 (795 per game)
- Scoring leader: (United States) Haley Skarupa (11 points)

The 2012 U18 IIHF Women's World Championship was the fifth IIHF U18 Women's World Championship and was hosted in Zlín and Přerov, Czech Republic. It began on 31 December 2011 with the gold medal game played on 7 January 2012.

Canada won the title for the second time after defeating United States 3–0 in the final. Sweden captured the bronze medal with a 4–1 victory over Germany.

With an attendance of 17,480, the tournament set a record for most-attended IIHF U18 Women's World Championship. The previous record holder was the inaugural championship.

== Top Division ==
=== Preliminary round ===
All times are local (UTC+1).

==== Group A ====
All games are being played at Zlín.

Team	Pld	W	OTW	OTL	L	GF	GA	GD	Pts	Qualification
United States	3	3	0	0	0	28	1	+27	9	Semifinals
Sweden	3	2	0	0	1	10	10	0	6	Quarterfinals
Czech Republic	3	1	0	0	2	4	17	−13	3	Quarterfinals
Russia	3	0	0	0	3	2	16	−14	0	Relegation round

Source: IIHF

31 December 2011; 13:00	Czech Republic	1–4 (0–2, 1–1, 0–1)	Sweden	PSG Arena; Attendance: 860

Game reference

Veronika Hladíková
Goalies
Sara Besseling
Referee:
(Japan) Kyoko Ugajin
Linesmen:
(Japan) Chieko Inoue
(Finland) Anna Majapuro

	0–1	M. Lowenheilm (L. Hedin) (PP) – 07:53
	0–2	S. Küller (E. Johansson) (PP) – 16:43
	0–3	J. Lennartsson – 30:27
K. Mazánková (D. Křížová) (PP) – 34:40	1–3
	1–4	L. Peterson (E. Johansson M. Lowenheilm) – 48:52

12 min
Penalties
10 min
22
Shots
28

31 December 2011; 17:00	United States	8–0 (2–0, 2–0, 4–0)	Russia	PSG Arena; Attendance: 200

Game reference

Sidney Peters
Goalies
Margarita Monakhova
Referee:
(Canada) Mary Anne Gage
Linesmen:
(Slovakia) Magdaléna Čerhitová
(Netherlands) Bianca Schipper-Poeteray

H. Skarupa (L. Stecklein, P. Savage) – 09:48	1–0
H. Skarupa (D. Trivigno, J. Hampton) (PP) – 17:53	2–0
M. D'Oench (S. Daniels) – 32:51	3–0
D. Trivigno (S. Daniels, L. Stecklein) (PP) – 37:17	4–0
D. Trivigno (M. Kennedy-Menefee) – 45:55	5–0
P. Savage (A. Carpenter) – 52:48	6–0
H. Skarupa (A. Carpenter, P. Savage) – 53:18	7–0
S. Daniels (D. Cameranesi) – 59:46	8–0

4 min
Penalties
10 min
71
Shots
13

1 January 2012; 15:00	Czech Republic	2–0 (0–0, 0–0, 2–0)	Russia	PSG Arena; Attendance: 690

Game reference
Veronika Hladíková	Goalies	Margarita Monakhova	Referee: (Finland) Anu Hirvonen; Linesmen: (United States) Kate Connolly (Finland) Anna Majapuro
T. Vanišová (A. Lédlová) – 42:21 / 1–0; K. Chmelová (D. Křížová) (SH) – 57:30 / 2–0			Referee: (Finland) Anu Hirvonen; Linesmen: (United States) Kate Connolly (Finland) Anna Majapuro
35 min	Penalties	10 min	Referee: (Finland) Anu Hirvonen; Linesmen: (United States) Kate Connolly (Finland) Anna Majapuro
35	Shots	25	Referee: (Finland) Anu Hirvonen; Linesmen: (United States) Kate Connolly (Finland) Anna Majapuro

1 January 2012; 19:00	Sweden	0–7 (0–3, 0–0, 0–4)	United States	PSG Arena; Attendance: 210

Game reference

Jessica Hjorth
Goalies
Brianna Laing
Referee:
(Czech Republic) Ludmila Nelibova
Linesmen:
(Canada) Stephanie Gagnon
(Japan) Chieko Inoue

0–1	A. Carpenter (M. Kennedy-Menefee, A. Pankowski) – 09:38
0–2	D. Trivigno (L. Stecklein, M. Kennedy-Menefee) (PP) – 11:54
0–3	H. Skarupa (P. Savage, D. Trivigno) – 18:26
0–4	H. Skarupa (P. Savage, D. Trivigno) – 41:41
0–5	A. Pankowski (C. Burke) (PP) – 49:34
0–6	A. Pankowski (A. Carpenter) – 56:04
0–7	H. Skarupa (P. Savage) – 56:13

10 min
Penalties
4 min
10
Shots
56

3 January 2012; 15:00	Russia	2–6 (0–2, 1–2, 1–2)	Sweden	PSG Arena; Attendance: 290

Game reference

Margarita Monakhova
Goalies
Jessica Hjorth
Referee:
(United States) Dina Allen
Linesmen:
(Denmark) Maria Raabye Füchsel
(Netherlands) Bianca Schipper-Poeteray

	0–1	1:18 – L. Peterson
	0–2	18:37 – A. Kjellbin (M. Löwenhielm) (PP2)
L. Belyakova (Y. Dergacheva, Y. Dyupina) (PP) – 36:00	1–2
	1–3	37:30 – M. Andersson (J. Lennartsson)
	1–4	39:42 – A. Kjellbin (M. Löwenhielm)
L. Belyakova (SH) – 46:58	2–4
	2–5	47:36 – A. Kjellbin (PS)
	2–6	51:23 – L. Bäcklin

10 min
Penalties
12 min
21
Shots
23

3 January 2012; 19:00	United States	13–1 (3–0, 5–1, 5–0)	Czech Republic	PSG Arena; Attendance: 850

Game reference

Sidney Peters
Goalies
Veronika Hladíková (23:54)
Lenka Craigová (36:06)
Referee:
(Sweden) Malin Axelsson
Linesmen:
(Canada) Stephanie Gagnon
(Finland) Anna Majapuro

A. Carpenter (C. Burke, A. Pankowski) – 0:22	1–0
M. Illikainen (D. Cameranesi, A. Carpenter) – 8:36	2–0
H. Skarupa (M. Kennedy-Menefee) – 13:25	3–0
H. Skarupa (P. Savage) – 21:10	4–0
	4–1	22:22 – T. Vanišová
A. Carpenter (A. Pankowski) – 23:54	5–1
B. Mastel – 29:05	6–1
M. D'Oench (S. Daniels) (PP) – 35:53	7–1
K. Schipper (M. Illikainen) – 36:09	8–1
C. Burke (D. Crossman) – 44:25	9–1
H. Skarupa (M. Illikainen) – 45:34	10–1
A. Pankowski (A. Carpenter, M. Kennedy-Menefee) – 48:21	11–1
A. Pankowski (M. Kennedy-Menefee) – 52:03	12–1
P. Savage (S. Daniels, B. Mastel) – 59:01	13–1

6 min
Penalties
12 min
47
Shots
9

==== Group B ====
All games are being played at Přerov.

Team	Pld	W	OTW	OTL	L	GF	GA	GD	Pts	Qualification
Canada	3	3	0	0	0	26	1	+25	9	Semifinals
Germany	3	1	0	0	2	6	10	−4	3	Quarterfinals
Finland	3	1	0	0	2	6	12	−6	3	Quarterfinals
Switzerland	3	1	0	0	2	7	22	−15	3	Relegation round

Source: IIHF

31 December 2011; 13:00	Canada	13–1 (2–1, 5–0, 6–0)	Switzerland	Zimní stadion Přerov; Attendance: 1,400

Game reference

Emerance Maschmeyer
Goalies
Janine Alder
Referee:
(Sweden) Malin Axelsson
Linesmen:
(United States) Kate Connolly
(Czech Republic) Michaela Štefková

T. Woods (K. Capizzano) – 04:40	1–0
	1–1	05:12 – I. Waidacher (P. Stanz) (PP)
C. Dubois (N. Connery) – 09:34	2–1
T. Woods (E. Sowchuk) (SH) – 20:47	3–1
A. Crossley (E. Ambrose) – 22:58	4–1
C. Dubois (S. Lefort) – 31:04	5–1
E. Clark – 31:56	6–1
C. Mercer (L. Stacey) – 33:01	7–1
C. Roesler (M. Richardson) (PP) – 40:29	8–1
C. Mercer (L. Stacey) – 44:55	9–1
L. Stacey – 52:03	10–1
N. Connery (S. Lefort) (PP) – 54:28	11–1
R. Kohler (S. MacAulay) – 57:26	12–1
C. Dubois (N. Connery) – 58:17	13–1

10 min
Penalties
12 min
72
Shots
26

31 December 2011; 17:00	Finland	3–0 (1–0, 1–0, 1–0)	Germany	Zimní stadion Přerov; Attendance: 700

Game reference

Isabella Portnoj
Goalies
Janina Fuchs
Referee:
(United States) Dina Allen
Linesmen:
(Czech Republic) Barbora Bednářová
(Denmark) Maria Raabye Füchsel

J. Suokko (A. Rantanen, C. Alanko) – 16:01	1–0
A. Kilponen (C. Alanko, J. Suokko) – 32:53	2–0
S. Ollikainen (R. Lindholm, J. Koivisto) (PP) – 47:05	3–0

14 min
Penalties
8 min
26
Shots
45

1 January 2012; 15:00	Finland	3–5 (2–1, 1–4, 0–0)	Switzerland	Zimní stadion Přerov; Attendance: 850

Game reference

Isabella Portnoj
Goalies
Janine Alder
Referee:
(Canada) Mary Anne Gage
Linesmen:
(Czech Republic) Barbora Bednářová
(Netherlands) Bianca Schipper-Poeteray

E. Ritari (V. Kotkaslahti) – 08:25	1–0
	1–1	12:14 – P. Stanz (R. Eggimann, M. Dale)
A. Rantanen (C. Alanko, J. Koivisto) – 13:06	2–1
	2–2	21:04 – I. Waidacher (L. Stalder, D. Ruegg)
	2–3	24:52 – P. Stanz (I. Waidacher, D. Scheurer)
V. Kotkaslahti (A. Kilponen, N. Tulus) (PP2) – 26:49	3–3
	3–4	37:52 – P. Stanz (D. Scheurer, L. Stalder) (PP)
	3–5	39:59 – S. Wuttke (I. Waidacher)

10 min
Penalties
12 min
33
Shots
50

1 January 2012; 19:00	Germany	0–6 (0–1, 0–1, 0–4)	Canada	Zimní stadion Přerov; Attendance: 1,150

Game reference

Franziska Albl
Goalies
Elaine Chuli
Referee:
(Japan) Kyoko Ugajin
Linesmen:
(Slovakia) Magdaléna Čerhitová
(Czech Republic) Michaela Štefková

0–1	09:55 – T. Woods (E. Clark)
0–2	34:45 – L. Stacey (E. Ambrose) (PP)
0–3	44:25 – E. Ambrose (M. Dufault)
0–4	45:16 – C. Roesler (SH)
0–5	50:04 – C. Dubois (S. MacAulay, T. Woods)
0–6	54:41 – R. Kohler (C. Mercer)

10 min
Penalties
12 min
18
Shots
80

3 January 2012; 15:00	Switzerland	1–6 (1–1, 0–1, 0–4)	Germany	Zimní stadion Přerov; Attendance: 600

Game reference

Janine Adler
Goalies
Franziska Albl
Referee:
(Finland) Anu Hirvonen
Linesmen:
(Japan) Chieko Inoue
(Czech Republic) Michaela Štefková

L. Stalder (I. Waidacher, M. Dale) (PP) – 12:40	1–0
	1–1	18:13 – M. Delarbre (J. Ujcik) (PP)
	1–2	26:38 – K. Spielberger (M. Delarbre) (PP2)
	1–3	40:26 – K. Spielberger (L. Kluge)
	1–4	47:18 – M. Delarbre
	1–5	52:17 – K. Spielberger (M. Delarbre)
	1–6	59:36 – K. Spielberger (M. Delarbre) (EN)

12 min
Penalties
10 min
61
Shots
47

3 January 2012; 19:00	Canada	7–0 (3–0, 2–0, 2–0)	Finland	Zimní stadion Přerov; Attendance: 2,300

Game reference

Emerance Maschmeyer
Goalies
Tiina Ranne
Referee:
(Czech Republic) Ludmila Nelibova
Linesmen:
(Czech Republic) Barbora Bednářová
(United States) Kate Connolly

N. Connery (M. Dufault, L. Stacey) – 5:30	1–0
E. Clark (T. Woods) – 9:29	2–0
L. Stacey (M. Dufault) – 10:41	3–0
R. Kohler (A. Crossley, C. Mercer) (PP) – 31:52	4–0
M. Dufault (N. Connery, H. Krzyzaniak) – 39:10	5–0
S. Lefort (A. Crossley, C. Mercer) (PP) – 43:06	6–0
C. Roesler (M. Dufault) – 48:14	7–0

4 min
Penalties
18 min
95
Shots
10

=== Relegation round ===
The teams played a best-of-three series.

All times are local (UTC+1).

4 January 2012; 17:00	Switzerland	4–2 (1–1, 1–0, 2–1)	Russia	Zimní stadion Přerov; Attendance: 750

Game reference

Janine Adler
Goalies
Margarita Monakhova
Referee:
(Czech Republic) Ludmila Nelibova
Linesmen:
(Slovakia) Magdaléna Čerhitová
(Netherlands) Bianca Schipper-Poeteray

P. Stanz (I. Waidacher, M. Dale) (PP) – 10:51	1–0
	1–1	18:54 – L. Belyakova
P. Stanz – 20:42	2–1
L. Stalder (I. Waidacher) – 45:13	3–1
	3–2	50:13 – L. Belyakova (Y. Dergacheva)
R. Eggimann (I. Waidacher) (PP) – 57:00	4–2

20 min
Penalties
14 min
51
Shots
54

6 January 2012; 15:00	Russia	5–3 (2–1, 1–1, 2–1)	Switzerland	Zimní stadion Přerov; Attendance: 350

Game reference

Margarita Monakhova
Goalies
Janine Adler
Referee:
(Sweden) Malin Axelsson
Linesmen:
(Slovakia) Magdaléna Čerhitová
(Japan) Chieko Inoue

	0–1	1:33 - R. Eggimann (P. Stanz)
L. Belyakova (Y. Dergacheva) (PP) - 9:47	1–1
X. Baibakova - 15:38	2–1
L. Belyakova (Y. Dyupina) - 31:34	3–1
	3–2	38:16 - (PP) L. Stalder (R. Eggimann)
Y. Dyupina (A. Goncharenko)- 51:45	4–2
Y. Dyupina (SH) - 54:15	5–2
	5–3	55:09 - P. Stanz

6 min
Penalties
10 min
43
Shots
38

7 January 2012; 17:00	Switzerland	2–3 (1–2, 1–0, 0–0) (OT: 0–1)	Russia	Zimní stadion Přerov; Attendance: 350

Game reference

Janine Adler
Goalies
Margarita Monakhova
Referee:
(United States) Dina Allen
Linesmen:
(United States) Kate Connolly
(Canada) Stephanie Gagnon

	0–1	01:32 – V. Pavlova (M. Batalova)
	0–2	13:25 – R. Isanbayeva (V. Pavlova L. Belyakova)
I. Waidacher (P. Stanz) – 19:50	1–2
L. Stalder – 32:04	2–2
	2–3	61:44 – V. Pavlova

10 min
Penalties
8 min
59
Shots
46

Switzerland is relegated to Division I for the 2013 IIHF World Women's U18 Championship.

=== Final round ===
Quarterfinals
A2	Sweden	2
B3	Finland	1
B2	Germany	2
A3	Czech Republic	1

Semifinals
B1	Canada	7
A2	Sweden	0
A1	United States	7
B2	Germany	1

Final
B1	Canada	3
A1	United States	0
Third place
A2	Sweden	4
B2	Germany	1

All times are local (UTC+1).

==== Quarterfinals ====
4 January 2012; 15:00	Sweden	2–1 OT (0–0, 1–0, 0–1) (OT: 1–0)	Finland	PSG Arena; Attendance: 170

Game reference

Sara Besseling
Goalies
Isabella Portnoj
Referee:
(United States) Dina Allen
Linesmen:
(United States) Kate Connolly
(Denmark) Maria Raabye Füchsel

L. Peterson (A. Lindberg) – 21:31	1–0
	1–1	43:18 – E. Nuutinen (A. Rantanen)
M. Andersson (L. Hedin, L. Peterson) (OT) – 67:27	2–1

12 min
Penalties
4 min
32
Shots
27

4 January 2012; 19:00	Germany	2–1 (1–0, 0–0, 1–1)	Czech Republic	PSG Arena; Attendance: 680

Game reference

Franziska Albl
Goalies
Veronika Hladíková
Referee:
(Canada) Mary Anne Gage
Linesmen:
(Canada) Stephanie Gagnon
(Japan) Chieko Inoue

K. Spielberger (A-M. Fiegert) – 12:02	1–0
K. Spielberger (L. Kluge, M. Delarbre) (PP) – 40:34	2–0
	2–1	48:02 – K. Chmelová (A. Lédlová) (SH)

16 min
Penalties
24 min
21
Shots
29

==== Semifinals ====
6 January 2012; 15:00	United States	7–1 (3–1, 1–0, 3–0)	Germany	PSG Arena; Attendance: 260

Game reference

Brianna Laing
Goalies
Janina Fuchs
Referee:
(Finland) Anu Hirvonen
Linesmen:
(Finland) Anna Majapuro
(Netherlands) Bianca Schipper-Poeteray

K. Flug (C. Burke) – 4:03	1–0
	1–1	11:24 – K. Spielberger (M. Delarbre)
A. Carpenter (A. Pankowski, M. Kennedy-Menefee) – 12:52	2–1
H. Skarupa (C. Burke) – 18:46	3–1
M. Kennedy-Menefee (A. Pankowski, A. Carpenter) – 24:22	4–1
M. Kennedy-Menefee (A. Pankowski) – 50:45	5–1
H. Skarupa – 51:03	6–1
K. Flug (M. Illikainen) – 54:45	7–1

4 min
Penalties
4 min
86
Shots
6

6 January 2012; 19:00	Canada	7–0 (3–0, 2–0, 2–0)	Sweden	PSG Arena; Attendance: 310

Game reference

Elaine Chuli
Goalies
Sara Besseling
Referee:
(Japan) Kyoko Ugajin
Linesmen:
(Czech Republic) Barbora Bednářová
(Czech Republic) Michaela Štefková

C. Mercer (R. Kohler, S. Lefort) – 6:09	1–0
E. Sowchuk (E. Clark) – 8:15	2–0
E. Ambrose – 17:07	3–0
C. Mercer (E. Ambrose, C. Dubois) (PP) – 25:11	4–0
L. Stacey (N. Connery) – 25:55	5–0
S. Lefort (R. Kohler, C. Roesler) (PP) – 49:26	6–0
K. Capizzano (A. Brykaliuk) – 53:59	7–0

14 min
Penalties
10 min
33
Shots
6

==== Fifth place game ====
6 January 2012; 19:00	Finland	5–3 (1–1, 1–1, 3–1)	Czech Republic	Zimní stadion Přerov; Attendance: 3,250

Game reference

Isabella Portnoj
Goalies
Veronika Hladíková
Referee:
(Canada) Mary Ann Gage
Linesmen:
(Denmark) Maria Raabye Füchsel
(Canada) Stephanie Gagnon

	0–1	8:24 – S. Kolowratová (D. Křížová)
V. Kotkaslahti (J. Suokko, S. Ollikainen) – 15:51	1–1
	1–2	22:18 – T. Vanišová
S. Valkama (A. Kilponen) (PP) – 25:54	2–2
J. Suokko (E. Nuutinen, S. Ollikainen) – 41:43	3–2
	3–3	44:07 – K. Chmelová
V. Tanskanen (R. Valkjarvi) – 44:53	4–3
N. Tulus (PP) – 58:29	5–3

10 min
Penalties
10 min
40
Shots
26

==== Bronze medal game ====
7 January 2012; 15:00	Sweden	4–1 (0–1, 1–0, 3–0)	Germany	PSG Arena; Attendance: 310

Game reference

Jessica Hjorth
Goalies
Franziska Albl
Referee:
(Canada) Mary Ann Gage
Linesmen:
(Slovakia) Magdalena Cerhitova
(Czech Republic) Michaela Stefkova

	0–1	04:40 – K. Spielberger (M. Delarbre, J. Ujcik)
E. Johansson – 30:38	1–1
M. Löwenhielm (O. Carlsson, M. Wong) – 46:51	2–1
M. Andersson (O. Carlsson, A. Kjellbin) – 52:11	3–1
I. Palm – 59:39	4–1

10 min
Penalties
10 min
33
Shots
18

==== Final ====
7 January 2012; 19:00	United States	0–3 (0–2, 0–0, 0–1)	Canada	PSG Arena; Attendance: 950

Game reference

Brianna Laing
Goalies
Emerance Maschmeyer
Referee:
(Japan) Kyoko Ugajin
Linesmen:
(Japan) Chieko Inoue
(Finland) Anna Majapuro

0–1	09:04 – A. Crossley (T. Woods)
0–2	14:03 – S. Lefort (S. MacAulay, A. Crossley) (PP)
0–3	55:42 – C. Roesler (S. Lefort) (PP)

12 min
Penalties
16 min
28
Shots
16

=== Ranking and statistics ===
==== Final rankings ====
Pos	Grp	Team	Pld	W	OTW	OTL	L	GF	GA	GD	Pts	Final result
1	B	Canada	5	5	0	0	0	36	1	+35	15	Champions
2	A	United States	5	4	0	0	1	35	5	+30	12	Runners-up
3	A	Sweden	6	3	1	0	2	16	19	−3	11	Third place
4	B	Germany	6	2	0	0	4	10	22	−12	6	Fourth place
5	B	Finland	5	2	0	1	2	12	17	−5	7	Fifth place game
6	A	Czech Republic (H)	5	1	0	0	4	8	24	−16	3	Fifth place game
7	A	Russia	6	1	1	0	4	12	25	−13	5	Win Relegation game
8	B	Switzerland	6	2	0	1	3	16	32	−16	7	Relegation to Division I A

Source: https://stats.iihf.com/Hydra/279/index.html
(H) Host

==== Scoring leaders ====
List shows the top skaters sorted by points, then goals. If the list exceeds 10 skaters because of a tie in points, all of the tied skaters are shown.

Player	GP	G	A	Pts	+/−	PIM	POS
(United States) Haley Skarupa	5	11	0	11	+11	0	FW
(United States) Anne Pankowski	5	4	6	10	+13	2	FW
(Switzerland) Phoebe Stänz	6	6	3	9	-9	12	FW
(United States) Alexandra Carpenter	5	4	5	9	+14	2	FW
(Switzerland) Isabel Waidacher	6	3	6	9	+1	4	FW
(United States) Maryanne Kennedy-Menefee	5	2	7	9	+12	2	FW
(Germany) Kerstin Spielberger	6	8	0	8	0	4	FW
(United States) Paige Savage	5	2	6	8	+10	2	FW
(Germany) Marie Delarbre	6	2	6	8	-1	10	FW
(Russia) Liudmila Belyakova	6	6	1	7	-2	6	FW
(Canada) Cayley Mercer	5	4	3	7	+8	0	FW
(Canada) Laura Stacey	5	4	3	7	+9	4	FW
(Canada) Sarah Lefort	5	3	4	7	+7	4	FW

GP = Games played; G = Goals; A = Assists; Pts = Points; +/− = P Plus–minus; PIM = Penalties in minutes; POS = Position

Source: IIHF.com Jan. 7, 2012 (21:15 GMT+1)

==== Leading goaltenders ====
Only the top five goaltenders, based on save percentage, who have played 40% of their team's minutes are included in this list.

Player	TOI	GA	GAA	Sv%	SO
(Canada) Elaine Chuli	120:00	0	0.00	100.00	2
(Canada) Emerance Maschmeyer	180:00	1	0.33	98.44	2
(Germany) Franziska Albl	238:41	11	2.77	94.55	0
(Finland) Isabella Portnoj	247:27	10	2.42	93.46	1
(Russia) Margarita Monakhova	341:45	24	4.21	91.14	0

TOI = Time on ice (minutes:seconds); GA = Goals against; GAA = Goals against average; Sv% = Save percentage; SO = Shutouts

Source: IIHF.com Jan. 7, 2012 (21:15 GMT+1)

==== Tournament awards ====
Best players selected by the directorate:

- Best Goaltender: (Germany) Franziska Albl
- Best Defenceman: (Canada) Erin Ambrose
- Best Forward: (United States) Alex Carpenter

== Division I ==
The qualification tournament was played in Asiago, Italy, from 29 November to 4 December 2011. The final tournament was played in Tromsø, Norway, from 29 December 2011 to 4 January 2012.

=== Qualification tournament ===
Team	Pld	W	OTW	OTL	L	GF	GA	GD	Pts	Qualification
Hungary	5	5	0	0	0	37	4	+33	15	Final tournament
Great Britain	5	2	1	1	1	19	16	+3	9	Final tournament
China	5	2	1	0	2	15	19	−4	8	
Italy	5	2	0	1	2	21	14	+7	7	
France	5	2	0	0	3	10	9	+1	6	
Kazakhstan	5	0	0	0	5	4	44	−40	0	

=== Final tournament ===
Team	Pld	W	OTW	OTL	L	GF	GA	GD	Pts	Promotion or relegation
Hungary	5	4	1	0	0	24	10	+14	14	Promoted to the 2013 Top Division
Austria	5	3	1	0	1	16	9	+7	11	
Japan	5	3	0	2	0	14	7	+7	11	
Norway	5	2	0	0	3	13	13	0	6	
Great Britain	5	1	0	0	4	10	14	−4	3	Relegated to the 2013 Division I Qualification
Slovakia	5	0	0	0	5	5	29	−24	0	Relegated to the 2013 Division I Qualification

Source: IIHF
