= Alex Carpenter =

American ice hockey player (born 1994)

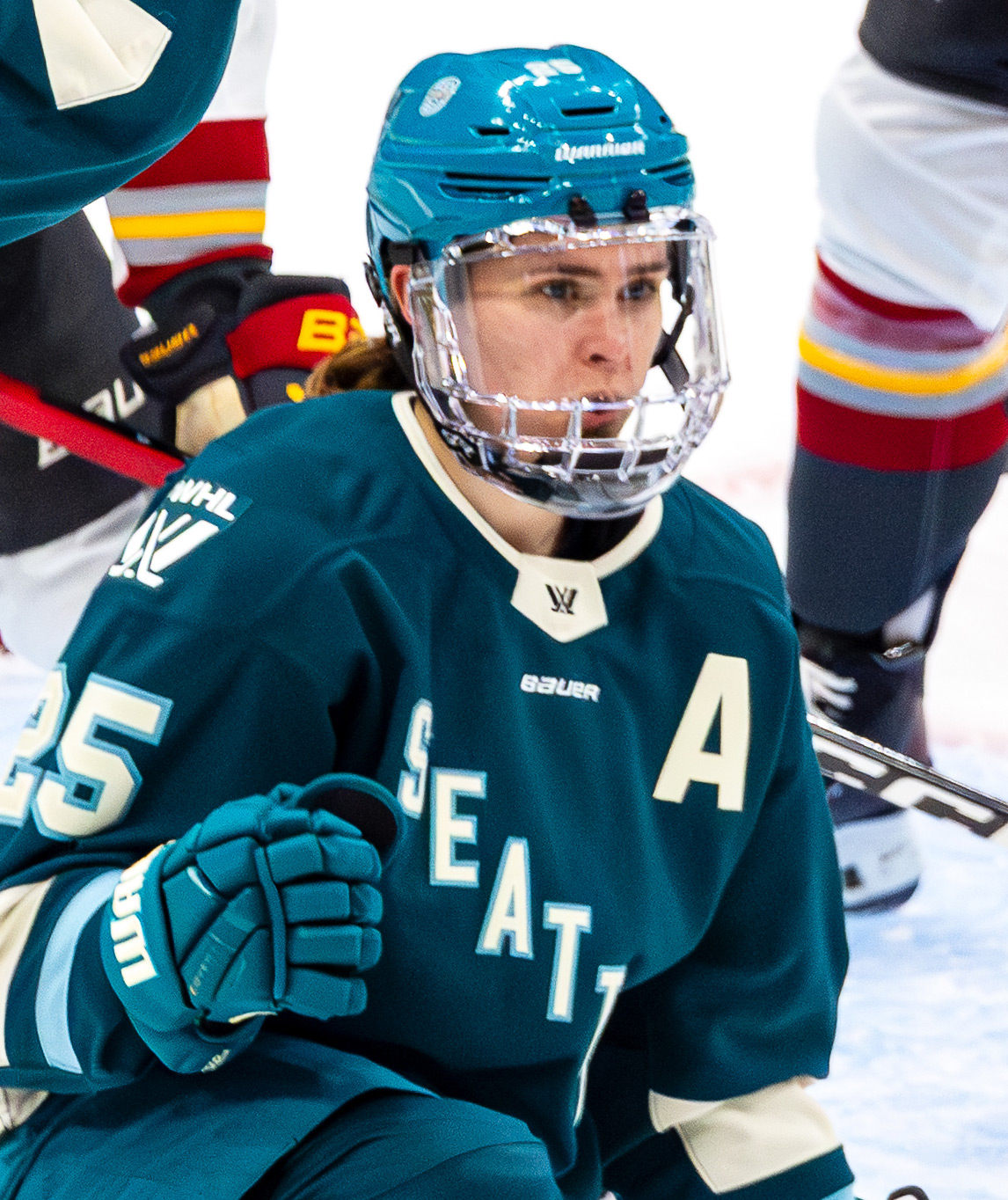
- Carpenter in 2025
- Born: April 13, 1994 (age 32) North Reading, Massachusetts, U.S.
- Height: 5 ft 7 in (170 cm)
- Weight: 154 lb (70 kg; 11 st 0 lb)
- Position: Forward
- Shoots: Left
- PWHL team Former teams: Seattle Torrent: Boston Pride; KRS Vanke Rays; New York Sirens
- National team: United States
- Playing career: 2011–present

Alexandra Carpenter (AL-iks-KAR-pən-tər; born April 13, 1994) is an American professional ice hockey player who is a forward for the Seattle Torrent of the Professional Women's Hockey League (PWHL) and the United States national team.

Widely recognized as one of the top players in women's hockey, Carpenter won the Patty Kazmaier Award as the best player in NCAA in 2015 and holds numerous Boston College scoring records. She has represented the United States in multiple Winter Olympics and World Championships, earning silver medals at the 2014 and 2022 Olympics, a gold medal at the 2026 Olympics, and gold medals at the World Championships in 2013, 2015, 2016, 2017, 2019, 2023, and 2025.

Carpenter has played professionally in the United States, Canada, China, and Russia since 2016. In the PWHL's inaugural season with New York, she ranked second in the league in points and was named a First Team All-Star. She signed with the Seattle Torrent, an expansion team, in 2025.

== Early life ==
Born in North Reading, Massachusetts, Alex is the oldest child and only daughter of Julie Carpenter, a former competitive figure skater and former National Hockey League (NHL) player Bobby Carpenter . She has two younger brothers: Robert ("Bobo") and Brendan. The family relocated multiple times during Carpenter's childhood to accommodate her father's NHL career, including moves to Morristown, New Jersey, and Albany, New York. By the time Carpenter reached high school age, the family settled permanently in North Reading, with her parents recognizing the toll that frequent moves had taken on other NHL families. Her father built backyard ice rinks at each of their homes, following a tradition established by his own father. The backyard rink, illuminated by floodlights, became a central gathering place for the Carpenter children, with late-night skating sessions that Bobo Carpenter later described as "special moments" that brought the siblings close together.

Despite being immersed in a hockey environment, Carpenter initially played soccer and did not take up hockey until age seven, which was considered late by hockey family standards. Bobby Carpenter intentionally did not pressure his children to play hockey, believing that "if the child doesn't want to do it, they're not going to be good at it." Once Carpenter began playing, her father provided extensive mentorship, often picking her up from school during his tenure with the Devils organization and bringing her to the team's practice facility in West Orange, New Jersey, for personalized training sessions focused on skating and puck control. On one occasion, she borrowed Brian Gionta's skates and took shots on Martin Brodeur after Devils practices. Carpenter played youth hockey with the Valley Jr. Warriors alongside her brother, describing the organization as "paramount to the careers that we have today." She was often the only girl on the ice, and at age 10, her father had to coach her on handling the attention and compliments from admirers.

When Carpenter was nine years old, her father took her to the Polar Bears Tournament in Connecticut, where she competed against much older players and demonstrated exceptional ability, leading Bobby Carpenter to recognize her potential for elite-level play. As a child, Carpenter watched the 2002 Winter Olympics at age eight, which inspired her Olympic aspirations. Her father introduced her to Vicki Movsessian, a member of the United States' 1998 gold medal-winning team, who brought her Olympic medal. Upon seeing it, the young Carpenter told her father, "that's really nice, but it's not going to be as nice as the one I'm going to wear."

In the fall of 2007, Carpenter joined The Governor's Academy in Byfield, Massachusetts, where she played for their varsity team beginning at 13 years old. Over four years, she totaled 239 goals and 427 points in 100 games, being named team MVP in each season and captaining the team as a senior.

== Playing career ==
=== Collegiate ===
On July 22, 2010, Carpenter committed to play college ice hockey at Boston College. After fielding calls from over 20 programs on the first day she was eligible for recruitment, she chose between Boston College and Harvard, swayed in part by her experience playing alongside BC students at the international level and her respect for Eagles coach Katie King.

External videos
- Alex Carpenter college hockey tournament highlights at Boston College, NCAA Championships

In the 2011–12 season, Carpenter's freshman year, she led the Eagles in scoring with 39 points, the first freshman to do so since 2006. She was named a first team Hockey East All-Star and to the conference's All-Rookie Team, as well as its rookie of the month on four separate occasions. In her sophomore season in 2012–13, Carpenter led the Eagles with 70 points, including a conference-leading 48 points in Hockey East play. She set a conference record with a 24-game point streak from October 21, 2012 to February 2, 2013, and was named player of the year for both Hockey East and New England. She recorded her 100th career point against UConn on February 17, 2013.

Carpenter took a leave of absence for the 2013–14 season in order to prepare for the 2014 Winter Olympics with the American national team. During her junior season, the 2014–15 season, Carpenter recorded 37 goals and 44 assists for 81 points, all of which led the NCAA. She also led the nation in goals per game (1.00), assists per game (1.19), points per game (2.19), and game winning goals (9). She recorded multiple points in a game on 25 occasions, including six points against Harvard on November 28, 2014. For her achievements, she was named Hockey East player of the year and won the Patty Kazmaier Award, becoming the first Boston College player and the first player from the Hockey East conference to claim the award.

External videos
- 2015 Patty Kazmaier Award Ceremony: Alex Carpenter, USA Hockey

As a senior and one of three team captains in the 2015–16 season, Carpenter set program records with 43 goals, 45 assists, and 88 points in 41 games. She recorded four hat tricks, including four goals against Syracuse University on December 10, 2015, a game in which she set the program record for career goals. She was named Most Valuable Player of the Hockey East Tournament, scoring three goals and six points as Boston College claimed the conference championship. She and the Eagles' season would end in the finals of the 2016 Frozen Four, with the team having set NCAA records for assists and points in a season, with 379 and 592, respectively. She was named a top-three finalist for the Patty Kazmaier Award, but ultimately did not repeat as its winner.

Upon her graduation in 2016, Carpenter's 133 goals, 145 assists, and 278 points were the most in Eagles history. She also set program records in power play goals (26), game-winning goals (27), and plus/minus (+180), and ranked fifth in all-time NCAA goals and points.

=== Professional ===
==== Boston Pride (2016–17) ====
Carpenter was the first player selected in the National Women's Hockey League's (NWHL) inaugural 2015 NWHL draft, chosen first overall by the New York Riveters on June 20, 2015. However, she opted to return to Boston College for her senior season rather than immediately joining the league. On April 28, 2016, Carpenter's playing rights were traded from the Riveters to the Boston Pride in exchange for the rights to Miye D'Oench, the Pride's fourth-round selection from the 2015 draft. During the summer of 2016, following her graduation from Boston College, Carpenter signed a one-year contract with the Pride worth $19,500, making her the highest-paid player from the 2015 NWHL draft class.

In the 2016–17 season, Carpenter made an immediate impact with the Pride. She recorded 9 goals and 20 assists for 29 points in 17 regular season games, finishing as the league's second-highest scorer. She finished the season as the second highest scorer in the league. Carpenter was selected to participate in the 2nd NWHL All-Star Game in February 2017, playing for Team Steadman, where she recorded a goal and an assist.

==== Shenzhen KRS and Shenzhen KRS Vanke Rays (2017–21) ====
Following her season in the NWHL, Carpenter registered for the 2017 Draft of the Canadian Women's Hockey League (CWHL) and was drafted in the second round, 13th overall by Shenzhen-based Kunlun Red Star WIH, one of the two Chinese expansion teams. On January 15, 2018, after being cut from the United States Olympic team, she signed with Kunlun, swayed in part by her father Bobby Carpenter being a coach of their Kontinental Hockey League (KHL) club, HC Kunlun Red Star. The following season, the two Chinese CWHL teams were merged to become the Shenzhen KRS Vanke Rays, and Carpenter re-signed with the team. She would finish the 2018–19 season with 31 points in 28 games.

External videos
- U.S. Olympian Alex Carpenter takes on new challenge in China, Shenzhen Kunlun Red Star

With the CWHL ceasing operations after the 2018–19 season, the Vanke Rays joined the Zhenskaya Hockey League (ZhHL), the Russian women's league. Carpenter again chose to remain in China, citing the better facilities and player support provided by the team than what she had experienced in the NWHL. She supported the boycott of North American leagues that had led to the formation of the Professional Women's Hockey Players Association (PWHPA) and occasionally attended its meetings despite being unable to participate in its events.

Carpenter served as Shenzhen's captain for the 2020–21 season, recording 29 goals and 55 points in 28 games in what would be her last season in China.

==== Professional Women's Hockey Players Association (2022–23) ====
On May 2, 2019, over 200 women's hockey players announced via coordinated social media posts that they would boycott any professional league in North America for the 2019–20 season. The players stated they were "coming together, not just as individual players, but as one collective voice to help navigate the future" of women's professional hockey. On May 20, 2019, the players formed the Professional Women's Hockey Players Association (PWHPA) as a non-profit organization. The PWHPA organized the Dream Gap Tour that toured several cities in Canada and the United States, featuring community involvement events and exhibition games where the top players in the sport competed. The 2022–23 season saw Carpenter return to North America, participating in PWHPA events for the first time with Team Scotiabank, earning PWHPA All-Star honors and a spot in the skills competition at the 2023 National Hockey League All-Star Game. In May 2022, the PWHPA signed a letter of intent with Billie Jean King Enterprises and the Mark Walter Group to explore a new professional league.

==== New York Sirens (2023–25) ====
On September 8, 2023, New York of the newly created Professional Women's Hockey League (PWHL) announced that they had signed Carpenter, along with American forward Abby Roque and Canadian defenseman Micah Zandee-Hart, to three-year contracts as part of the league's pre-draft free agency period. On December 21, 2023, Carpenter and teammate Ella Shelton were named the first alternate captains in team history. In 24 games in the inaugural PWHL season, she recorded eight goals and 15 assists for 23 points, including a league-best six game points streak. She ranked first in assists and tied Marie-Philip Poulin for second in the league in points, earning nominations for forward of the year and league MVP. The Sirens finished the inaugural season with a record of 5-12-3, placing sixth in the league and missing the playoffs.

In the 2024–25 season, Carpenter continued as alternate captain for New York (now called the New York Sirens). On January 31, 2025, during a regular season game against the Boston Fleet that ended in a 3-2 shootout loss, Carpenter suffered a serious facial injury when she took a shot to the face that shattered her jaw. The injury required reconstructive surgery and forced her to miss four games with the Sirens as well as the U.S. Women's National Team Rivalry Series. Demonstrating her resilience, Carpenter returned to play on February 19, 2025, scoring the only goal for New York in a 4-1 loss to the Toronto Sceptres. Despite missing time due to injury, Carpenter finished the season with 20 points (11 goals, 9 assists) in 26 regular season games, ranking as the third-highest scorer on the team. The Sirens finished in last place for the second consecutive season with a record of 8-4-5-13 and 37 points, missing the playoffs after suffering a nine-game losing streak during Carpenter's absence in February.

==== Seattle Torrent (2025–present) ====
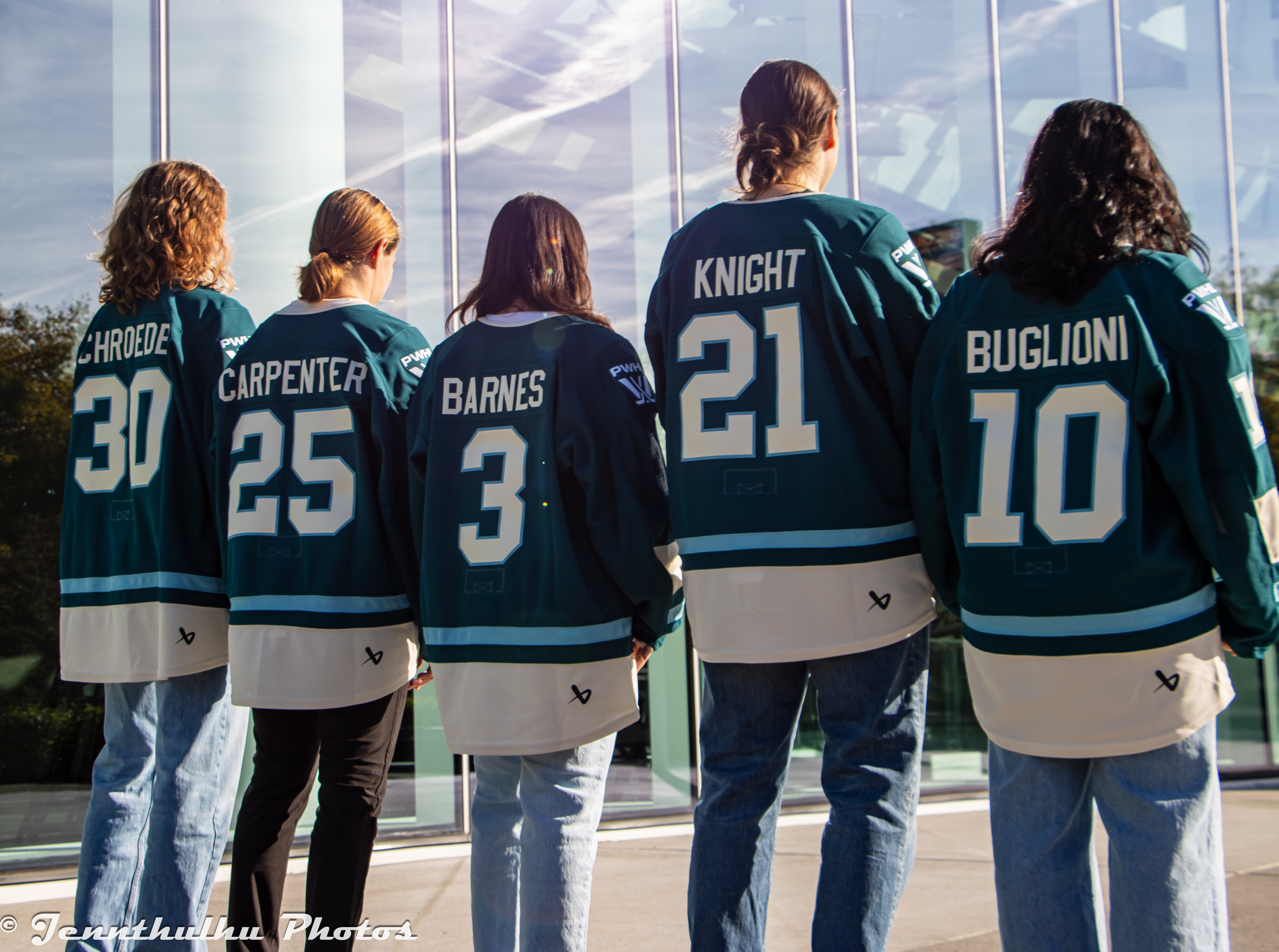
Carpenter with her Seattle Torrent teammates during the jersey unveiling, 2025

During the league's expansion to eight teams ahead of the 2025–26 season, Carpenter was left unprotected by New York and signed a one-year contract with the Seattle Torrent on June 6, 2025. At the time of her signing, Carpenter ranked third all-time in PWHL career points with 43 in 50 games played and was tied for first all-time in power play points with 18 (5 goals, 13 assists). General Manager Meghan Turner praised Carpenter as "a true competitor who brings intensity every time she steps on the ice" and "an elite two-way player who has proven to be one of the best in the world for years."

On November 20, 2025, Carpenter was named an alternate captain for the Torrent, joining captain Hilary Knight and fellow alternate captain Emily Brown in the team's inaugural leadership group. Carpenter made her Torrent debut on November 22, 2025, in the team's inaugural game against the Vancouver Goldeneyes, recording an assist in a 4–3 overtime loss.

The Torrent played their home opener on November 28, 2025, against the two-time defending Walter Cup champion Minnesota Frost before a record-setting crowd of 16,014 fans at Climate Pledge Arena. The attendance set multiple records: the largest crowd for a women's hockey game in a U.S. arena, surpassing the previous U.S. professional women's hockey record of 14,288, and the highest-attended primary home venue game in PWHL history. Carpenter recorded a game-high five shots on goal alongside Knight and linemate Julia Gosling, and led all players at the faceoff dot with a 79.2% success rate (19-for-24). The Torrent fell 3–0 to Minnesota in the game.

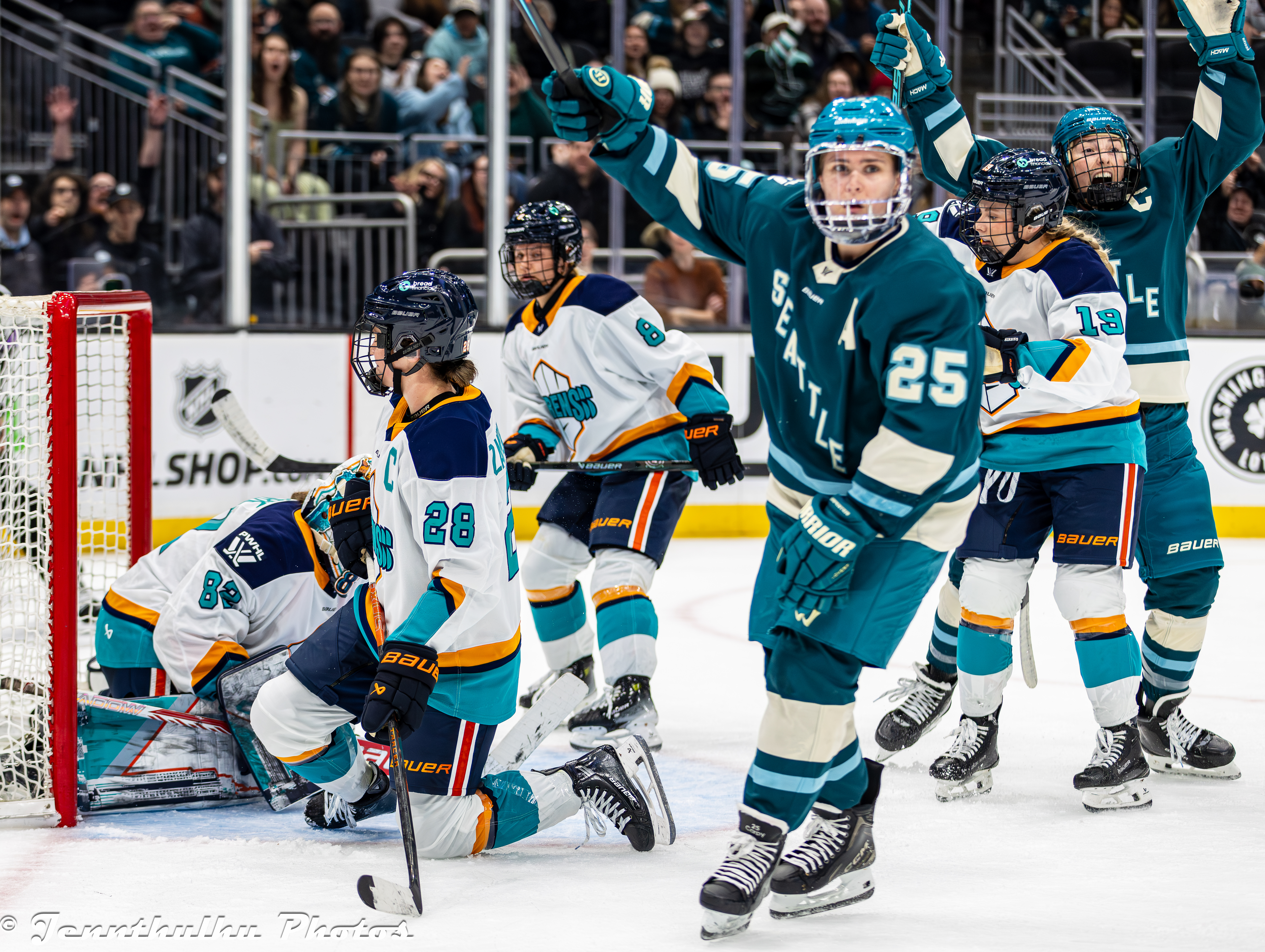
Carpenter and Hilary Knight celebrate after scoring a goal at Climate Pledge Arena, December 3, 2025

On December 3, 2025, Carpenter scored the first home goal in Torrent history, tying the game 1–1 against her former team, the New York Sirens, at 18:36 of the third period. Twenty-two seconds later, Knight scored the game-winning goal, giving Seattle its first victory in franchise history by a score of 2–1. Both goals came on a five-minute major power play following a checking-from-behind penalty. Carpenter's goal marked her 20th career PWHL goal and was scored against the Sirens, for whom she remains the all-time leading scorer with 43 points in 50 games over two seasons. On December 17, 2025, Carpenter recorded two goals and an assist as Seattle defeated the Ottawa Charge 4-1 for their second consecutive win and first back-to-back victories in franchise history. Carpenter scored a power-play goal almost 6½ minutes into the second period and added another goal about five minutes later to give the Torrent a 3-0 lead. The performance marked Carpenter's first multi-point game of the season, and she also recorded power-play goals in consecutive games. Carpenter was named first star of the game.

On December 23, 2025, Carpenter scored the game-tying goal at 3:32 of the second period in a 2–1 victory over the Montreal Victoire before 10,276 fans at Climate Pledge Arena. On a 2-on-1 rush with Julia Gosling, Carpenter cleaned up the rebound after Gosling's shot was saved by 2024–25 PWHL Goaltender of the Year Ann-Renée Desbiens, scoring her fourth goal of the season to tie the game 1–1. On January 20, 2026, Carpenter recorded two assists in Seattle's 6–4 victory over Toronto, snapping a three-game point drought. The Torrent's six goals set a franchise record and matched the season high for any PWHL team. The multi-point performance was her second of the season. In a home game on March 11, 2026, Carpenter scored with 5.6 seconds remaining in the first period against the Boston Fleet, carrying the puck end-to-end and backhanding in the goal to tie the game 1–1. The goal extended her point streak to three consecutive games since returning from the 2026 Winter Olympics. The game was the Torrent's first-ever win over Boston and ended a six-game winning streak for the first-place team.

== International play ==
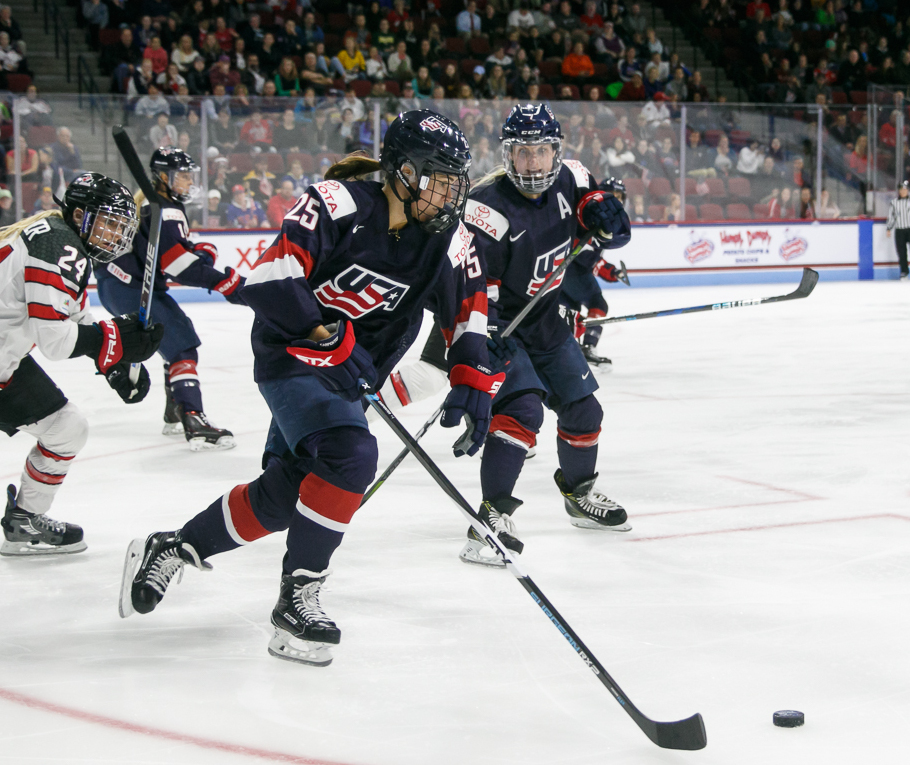
- Carpenter with Team USA in 2017

Medal record

Women's ice hockey

Representing United States

Olympic Games
Gold medal – first place	2026 Milano Cortina	Team
Silver medal – second place	2014 Sochi	Team
Silver medal – second place	2022 Beijing	Team

World Championships
Gold medal – first place	2013 Canada	
Gold medal – first place	2015 Sweden	
Gold medal – first place	2016 Canada	
Gold medal – first place	2017 United States	
Gold medal – first place	2019 Finland	
Gold medal – first place	2023 Canada	
Gold medal – first place	2025 Czechia	
Gold medal – first place	2026 Denmark	
Silver medal – second place	2021 Canada	
Silver medal – second place	2022 Denmark	
Silver medal – second place	2024 United States	

World U18 Championships
Gold medal – first place	2011 Sweden	
Silver medal – second place	2010 United States	
Silver medal – second place	2012 Czech Republic	

=== Junior ===
At 15 years old, Carpenter competed in multiple international competitions representing the United States, including an under-18 exhibition series against Canada and the 2009 Czech Challenge Cup, where she finished second in scoring despite being five or more years younger than some of the other players.

As the youngest American at the 2010 World U18 Championship, she scored eight goals and one assist in five games, tied for second in team scoring behind Kendall Coyne. She recorded a goal in the gold medal match as the Americans claimed silver, losing 5–4 in overtime to Canada.

Returning for the 2011 World U18 Championship, Carpenter led the tournament with ten points on the strength of six goals, including one in the 5–2 gold medal victory over Canada. She would be named a top three player on the American team and would win the award for Best Forward at the event. The following year, Carpenter captained the silver-winning American team, recorded four goals and nine points, and once again earned Best Forward honors.

=== Senior ===
Carpenter has played for the United States women's national ice hockey team since 2013 and has earned two Olympic silver medals (2014, 2022), one Olympic Gold medal (2026), as well as seven gold medals (2013, 2015, 2016, 2017, 2019, 2023, 2025) and three silver medals (2021, 2022, 2024) at the IIHF Women's World Championship.

==== World Championships ====
Carpenter made her senior international tournament debut at the 2013 World Championship, where the U.S. won the gold medal. Named alternate captain for the 2015 World Championship, Carpenter recorded two goals and an assist, helping the U.S. win gold. At the 2016 Women's World Championship, Carpenter scored a game-winning overtime goal to clinch a gold medal in a 1–0 victory over Canada. Named to the roster for the 2017 World Championship, Carpenter scored in the semifinal against Germany as the United States defeated the Germans 11–0. The U.S. won gold, defeating Canada 3–2 in overtime in the gold medal game in Plymouth, Michigan.

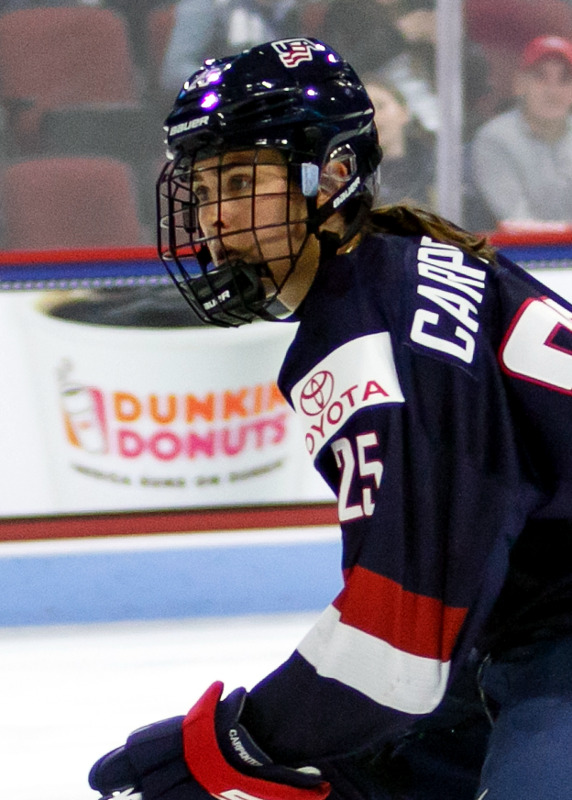
Carpenter playing for the United States women's national ice hockey team, 2017

Carpenter returned to Team USA for the 2019 World Championship, helping the U.S. win their fifth consecutive title. In February 2020, Carpenter was named to the U.S. roster for the 2020 World Championship,; however, the tournament was cancelled due to the COVID-19 pandemic. In the finals of the 2021 World Championship, Carpenter scored both of Team USA's two goals as the Americans fell in overtime to Canada, 3–2. She also helped the U.S. win silver at the 2022 World Championship. At the 2023 World Championship, Carpenter was named an alternate captain. In the opening game against Japan, she scored two goals and added an assist, earning Player of the Game honors as the United States won 7–1. The U.S. won the gold medal.

External videos
- Top Plays: Alex Carpenter, International Ice Hockey Federation

As alternate captain at the 2024 World Championship, Carpenter scored a hat trick in a 6–0 victory over the Czech Republic. She tied for the tournament lead in scoring with six goals and four assists in seven games and won a silver medal. She was subsequently named Best Forward and named to the All-Star team.

Leading again as alternate captain at the 2025 World Championship, Carpenter scored a goal and notched an assist in the opening game against the host Czech Republic in a 4–0 shutout victory. and also scored in the quarterfinal against Germany in a 3–0 shutout. In the gold medal game, Carpenter earned an assist on the opening goal of the game. The United States won the gold medal, defeating Canada 4–3 in overtime.

==== Olympics ====
===== 2014 Sochi =====
Carpenter competed at the 2014 Olympics as one of their youngest players at age 19, scoring four goals and adding an assist in five games as the Americans claimed silver. In the opening game against Finland, Carpenter scored on a backhand shot in the second period, assisted by Hilary Knight and Megan Bozek helping lift the U.S. to a 3–1 win. She also scored in the 9–0 rout of Switzerland. In the gold medal game, Carpenter gave the United States a 2–0 lead early in the third period when she tipped a feed from Knight past Canadian goaltender Shannon Szabados on the power play. However, Canada secured a dramatic comeback, scoring two goals in the final four minutes of regulation before Marie-Philip Poulin scored in overtime to claim a 3–2 victory sending the U.S. home with the silver medal.

===== 2018 PyeongChang omission =====
Despite being considered one of the best players in the world and having been an Olympian at 19 years old at the previous games, Carpenter was unexpectedly cut from the Team USA roster ahead of the 2018 Winter Olympics. The Americans claimed the gold medal in her absence.

===== 2022 Beijing =====
External videos
- Alex Carpenter 2022 Olympic Introduction, USA Hockey

On January 2, 2022, Carpenter was named to Team USA's roster for the 2022 Winter Olympics, marking her return to the Olympic roster after being cut four years earlier. In the opening game against Finland, Carpenter scored two goals—a power-play goal assisted by Jincy Dunne in the first period and another in the third period assisted by Abby Roque—in a 5–2 victory. She added her third goal of the tournament in the 5–0 victory over the Russian Olympic Committee, collecting a rebound from a shot from Amanda Kessel. In the preliminary round game against Canada, Carpenter scored on the power play off a perfect pass from Kessel to give the United States a brief 2–1 lead, though Canada rallied to win 4–2. Carpenter finished the tournament with three goals and one assist in the first three games. The United States won the silver medal, falling to Canada 3–2 in the gold medal game.

===== 2026 Milan Cortina =====
In December 2025, Carpenter competed in all four games of the 2025 Rivalry Series against Canada, which served as preparation for the 2026 Winter Olympics. She was part of a Seattle Torrent contingent that included teammates Hilary Knight, Hannah Bilka, Cayla Barnes, and Anna Wilgren on the U.S. roster. In the December 10 game in Edmonton, Carpenter scored one goal as the United States defeated Canada 10–4, marking the first time the Canadian women's national ice hockey team allowed 10 goals in a loss to the United States. The United States swept all four games of the series, outscoring Canada 24–7 overall.

On January 2, 2026, Carpenter was named to the U.S. roster for the 2026 Winter Olympics in Milan. Named an alternate captain alongside Megan Keller, Carpenter served in the leadership group with captain (and Torrent teammate) Hilary Knight. During the U.S. first game on February 5, Carpenter scored the opening goal of the game at 15:55 of the first period, deflecting a shot from Megan Keller past Czech goaltender Klara Peslarova on the power play to give the Americans a 1–0 lead. She also recorded an assist on Hilary Knight's goal in the second period helping the U.S. win 5–1 against Czechia. In the team's second game on February 7, Carpenter scored her second goal of the tournament at 15:19 of the first period in a 5–0 shutout victory over Finland. On the power play, she received a backhand pass in the slot from Laila Edwards and fired a one-timer into the top-left corner of the net, with Megan Keller also assisting on the play.

== Personal life ==
Carpenter is an out member of the LGBTQ community. She is married to Steph Klein, an assistant equipment manager with the Toronto Marlies. Carpenter is the eldest daughter of former NHL player Bobby Carpenter, who played 18 seasons with five different teams and won the Stanley Cup three times with the New Jersey Devils, one as a player and two as a coach. Her younger brother Robert, nicknamed "Bobo", played college hockey for Boston University.

A lifelong baseball and softball player, Carpenter was the first girl to play in the Morristown, New Jersey Little League in 25 years (performing as a pitcher, catcher, and shortstop) and was the first girl to play as a 10-year-old. She played softball in high school, earning all-league honors in all four years and serving as team captain as a senior.

== Career statistics ==
=== Regular season and playoffs ===
			Regular season					Playoffs
Season	Team	League	GP	G	A	Pts	PIM	GP	G	A	Pts	PIM
2011–12	Boston College	HE	35	21	18	39	8	—	—	—	—	—
2012–13	Boston College	HE	37	32	38	70	10	—	—	—	—	—
2014–15	Boston College	HE	37	37	44	81	13	—	—	—	—	—
2015–16	Boston College	HE	41	43	45	88	6	—	—	—	—	—
2016–17	Boston Pride	NWHL	17	9	20	29	0	2	3	3	6	0
2017–18	Kunlun Red Star	CWHL	13	5	7	12	0	4	1	0	1	0
2018–19	Shenzhen KRS	CWHL	28	17	14	31	0	—	—	—	—	—
2019–20	Shenzhen KRS	ZhHL	27	21	32	53	6	5	3	4	7	0
2020–21	Shenzhen KRS	ZhHL	28	29	26	55	6	2	1	0	1	0
2022–23	Team Scotiabank	PWHPA	20	6	5	11	2	—	—	—	—	—
2023–24	PWHL New York	PWHL	24	8	15	23	0	—	—	—	—	—
2024–25	New York Sirens	PWHL	26	11	9	20	0	—	—	—	—	—
2025–26	Seattle Torrent	PWHL	30	12	8	20	2	—	—	—	—	—
PWHL totals			80	31	32	63	2	—	—	—	—	—

=== International ===
Year	Team	Event	Result	GP	G	A	Pts	PIM
2010	United States	U18	2nd place, silver medalist(s)	5	8	1	9	0
2011	United States	U18	1st place, gold medalist(s)	5	6	4	10	0
2012	United States	U18	2nd place, silver medalist(s)	5	4	5	9	2
2013	United States	WC	1st place, gold medalist(s)	5	1	2	3	0
2014	United States	OG	2nd place, silver medalist(s)	5	4	1	5	2
2015	United States	WC	1st place, gold medalist(s)	5	2	1	3	0
2016	United States	WC	1st place, gold medalist(s)	5	1	2	3	0
2017	United States	WC	1st place, gold medalist(s)	5	1	0	1	2
2019	United States	WC	1st place, gold medalist(s)	7	2	5	7	0
2021	United States	WC	2nd place, silver medalist(s)	7	5	0	5	0
2022	United States	OG	2nd place, silver medalist(s)	7	4	3	7	0
2022	United States	WC	2nd place, silver medalist(s)	7	2	7	9	0
2023	United States	WC	1st place, gold medalist(s)	7	2	7	9	2
2024	United States	WC	2nd place, silver medalist(s)	7	6	4	10	2
2025	United States	WC	1st place, gold medalist(s)	7	2	6	8	0
2026	United States	OG	1st place, gold medalist(s)	7	3	3	6	0
Junior totals				15	18	10	28	2
Senior totals				81	35	41	76	8

== Awards and honors ==
Award	Year	Ref
College
Hockey East First Team All-Star	2012, 2013, 2015, 2016	
Hockey East All-Rookie Team	2012	
Second Team AHCA All-American	2013	
New England Player of the Year	2013, 2015	
Hockey East Player of the Year	2013, 2015	
Hockey East Scoring Champion	2013, 2015	
Patty Kazmaier Award	2015	
First Team AHCA All-American	2015, 2016	
Hockey East Three Stars Award	2015	
Hockey East All-Tournament Team	2016	
Hockey East Tournament MVP	2016	
NWHL
All-Star Game	2017	
CWHL
All-Star Game	2019	
ZhHL
Most Valuable Player	2020	
PWHL
First Team All-Star	2024	
International
World U18 Championship – Best Forward	2011, 2012	
World Championship – Best Forward	2024	
World Championship – Media All-Star Team	2024	

Awards and achievements
Preceded by Jamie Lee Rattray	Patty Kazmaier Award; 2015–16	Succeeded by Kendall Coyne Schofield
