= 2022–23 Team Sonnet season =

PWHPA League season

2022–23 Team Sonnet
- League: 4th PWHPA
- 2022–23 record: 4-12-4
- Goals for: 37
- Goals against: 63

Team information
- General manager: Rebecca Michael
- Coach: Laura McIntosh
- Assistant coach: Paul Geiger; PJ Michael

Team leaders
- Goals: Abby Roque (7); Hannah Brandt (7)
- Assists: Brianne Jenner (14)
- Points: Brianne Jenner (19)
- Penalty minutes: Abby Roque (12)
- Wins: Nicole Hensley (4)
- Goals against average: Nicole Hensley (2.57)

The 2022–23 Team Sonnet season was one of four region-agnostic ice hockey teams in the PWHPA, the final season of the Dream Gap Tour. The 2022–23 season was the league's fourth season of the Dream Gap Tour and the third season the team partnered with Sonnet Insurance.

The team featured notable Olympic players such as Brianne Jenner, Hilary Knight, and Abby Roque. Laura McIntosh returned as the head coach of Team Sonnet.

In the final game of the season, Team Sonnet lost 2-3 in overtime to Team Adidas after a breakaway goal from Kristin O'Neill. The team finished the season fourth in the standings.

Following the end of the season, the PWHPA announced the formation of the PWHL.

== Standings ==
Pos	Team	GP	W	L	OTL	RW	GF	GA	GD	Pts
1	Team Harvey's	20	12	3	1	8	70	42	28	45
2	Team Adidas	20	10	6	2	8	54	48	6	36
3	Team Scotiabank	20	7	12	–	6	55	63	-12	23
4	Team Sonnet	20	4	12	4	4	37	63	-26	16

== Schedule and results ==
Regulation Win = 3 points, OT/SO Wins = 2 points, OT/SO Loss = 1 point

2022–23 game log
#	Date	Visitor	Score	Home	OT	Venue	Record	Points	Recap
1	October 15	Team Scotiabank	2-4	Team Sonnet		Verdun Auditorium	1–0–0	3
2	October 16	Team Sonnet	2-3	Team Harvey's	SO	Verdun Auditorium	1–0–1	1
3	November 4	Team Scotiabank	2-1	Team Sonnet		Rath Eastlink CC	1–1–1	0
4	November 5	Team Harvey's	6-2	Team Sonnet		Rath Eastlink CC	1–2–1	0
5	November 6	Team Sonnet	4-1	Team Adidas		Rath Eastlink CC	2–2–1	3
6	November 26	Team Sonnet	4-5	Team Scotiabank		UPMC Lemieux Sports Complex	2–3–1	0
7	November 27	Team Adidas	3-1	Team Sonnet		UPMC Lemieux Sports Complex	2–4–1	0
8	December 9	Team Harvey's	3-2	Team Sonnet	SO	Centre Slush Puppie	2–4–2	1
9	December 10	Team Sonnet	0-4	Team Adidas		CTC	2–5–2	0
10	January 21	Team Harvey's	3-2	Team Sonnet		Eddie Bush Memorial Arena	2–6–2	0
11	January 22	Team Sonnet	1-6	Team Scotiabank		Eddie Bush Memorial Arena	2–7–2	0
12	February 10	Team Adidas	4-0	Team Sonnet		Meridian Centre	2–8–2	0
13	February 11	Team Sonnet	1-4	Team Scotiabank		Kitchener Memorial Auditorium	2–9–2	0
14	February 24	Team Adidas	3-2	Team Sonnet		AdventHealth Center Ice	2–10–2	0
15	February 25	Team Sonnet	2-4	Team Harvey's		AdventHealth Center Ice	2–11–2	0
16	February 26	Team Sonnet	2-0	Team Adidas		AdventHealth Center Ice	3–11–2	0
17	Mar 4	Team Sonnet	3-2	Team Scotiabank		MedStar Capitals Iceplex	4–11–2	3
18	Mar 5	Team Harvey's	3-1	Team Sonnet		MedStar Capitals Iceplex	4–12–2	3
19	Mar 10	Team Sonnet	1-2	Team Harvey's	OT	Great Park Ice	4–14–3	1
20	Mar 11	Team Sonnet	2-3	Team Adidas	OT	Toyota Sports Performance Center	4–12–4	1

== Player statistics ==
=== Skaters ===
Regular season
Player	GP	G	A	Pts	PIM
Erin Ambrose	16	2	3	5	6
Leah Bohlken	13	0	0	0	2
Hannah Brandt	20	7	4	11	4
Emily Brown	20	0	1	1	12
Emma Buckles	20	0	0	0	8
Hanna Bunton	18	0	1	1	0
Samantha Cogan	20	1	1	2	4
Demi Crossman	7	0	1	1	2
Iya Gavrilova	18	0	0	0	2
Brianne Jenner	20	5	14	19	2
Hilary Knight	18	4	6	10	0
Rebecca Leslie	20	0	3	3	2
Daniella Matteucci	-	-	-	-	-
Nikki Nightengale	2	0	0	0	0
Carolyne Prévost	9	0	1	1	0
Lillian Ribeirinha-Braga	5	1	0	1	2
Abby Roque	20	7	9	16	12
Malia Schneider	19	0	2	2	4
Haley Skarupa	11	2	0	2	4
Natasza Tarnowski	15	2	1	3	0
Claire Thompson	20	2	4	6	2
Alex Vasko	20	4	1	5	10
Micah Zandee-Hart	20	0	3	3	12

=== Goaltenders ===
Regular season
Player	GP	W	L	GAA	SV%
Nicole Hensley	13	4	-	2.57	.921
Erica Howe	4	0	0	3.54	.890
Lindsay Browning	4	0	0	3.23	.884
