= Sarah Lefort =

Canadian ice hockey player

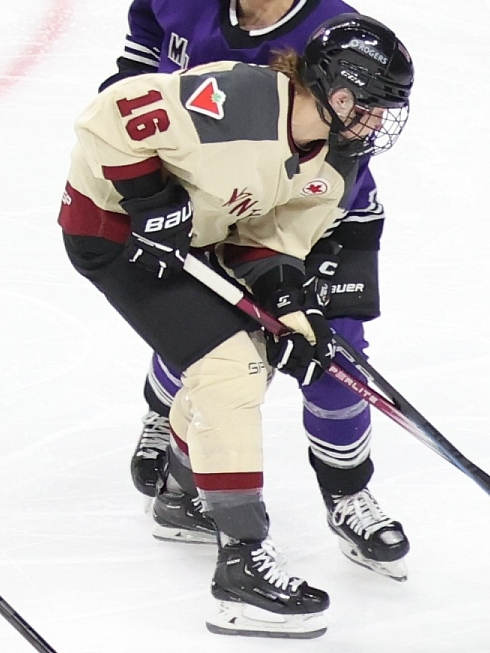
- Lefort with PWHL Montreal in 2024
- Born: February 9, 1994 (age 32) Ormstown, Quebec, Canada
- Height: 5 ft 7 in (170 cm)
- Weight: 164 lb (74 kg; 11 st 10 lb)
- Position: Forward
- Shot: Left
- PWHL team Former teams: Montréal Victoire: Montréal Force; PWHPA Montréal; Les Canadiennes de Montréal; Boston University Terriers
- Coached for: Cégep André-Laurendeau (QCHL)
- Playing career: 2012–2024
- Coaching career: 2019–present

Sarah Lefort (born February 9, 1994) is a former Canadian professional ice hockey player who played for Montréal Victoire of the Professional Women's Hockey League (PWHL).

== Playing career ==
=== Hockey Canada ===
Medal record

Women's ice hockey

Representing Canada

U18 World Championship
Gold medal – first place	2012 Czech Republic	

Nations Cup
Gold medal – first place	2015 Germany	

During the 2011–12 Canada women's national ice hockey team season, she was a member of the Canadian National Under 18 team that participated in the 2012 IIHF World Women's U18 Championship. In the gold medal game versus the United States, Lefort scored a goal as Canada claimed the gold by a 3–0 tally.

She was a member of Canada's National Women's Development Team that won a gold medal at the 2015 Nations Cup (formerly known as the Meco Cup).

=== Professional hockey ===
In the 2015 NWHL Draft, Lefort was claimed by the Buffalo Beauts. After graduating from Boston University in 2016 as the second-leading scorer in the history of the Boston University Terriers women's ice hockey program, she was the first round pick of Les Canadiennes de Montréal in the 2016 CWHL Draft.

In 2023, Lefort earned a contract with PWHL Montreal following a training camp invitation.

On October 29th, 2024, the Montréal Victoire announced on Instagram that Lefort had retired from professional hockey, but would be continuing with the team in a business role.

== Career statistics ==
			Regular season					Playoffs
Season	Team	League	GP	G	A	Pts	PIM	GP	G	A	Pts	PIM
2012-13	Boston University	HE	37	24	19	43	56	—	—	—	—	—
2013-14	Boston University	HE	38	32	23	55	56	—	—	—	—	—
2014-15	Boston University	HE	37	23	27	50	32	—	—	—	—	—
2015-16	Boston University	HE	34	13	22	35	56	—	—	—	—	—
2016-17	Montréal Canadiennes	CWHL	22	9	6	15	28	—	—	—	—	—
2017-18	Montréal Canadiennes	CWHL	28	18	13	31	24	2	1	0	1	0
2018-19	Montréal Canadiennes	CWHL	26	7	9	16	16	4	0	2	2	4
2019-20	Independent	PWHPA	—	—	—	—	—	—	—	—	—	—
2020-21	Montréal	PWHPA	4	1	2	3	2	—	—	—	—	—
2021-22	Montréal	PWHPA	8	4	7	11	0	—	—	—	—	—
2022-23	Montréal Force	PHF	17	7	3	10	27	—	—	—	—	—
2023-24	PWHL Montréal	PWHL	24	1	4	5	10	2	—	—	—	—
PWHL totals			24	1	4	5	10	2	—	—	—	—

== Awards and honours ==
- 2014-15 Hockey East Second Team All-Star
