= Taylor Woods =

Canadian ice hockey player and strongwoman

Personal information
- Born: September 26, 1994 (age 31) Morden, Manitoba, Canada
- Education: Cornell University
- Height: 160 cm (5 ft 3 in)
Ice hockey career
- Position: Forward
- Shoots: Right
- PHF team Former teams: Toronto Six: PWHPA; Markham Thunder; Brampton Thunder; Cornell Big Red
- Playing career: 2012–present

Sport
- Sport: Strongwoman
- Weight class: Under-64 kg
Medal record
Strongwoman
Representing Canada
Arnold Amateur Strongwoman World Championship
1st	2023 Columbus	U64KG
3rd	2022 Columbus	U64KG

Taylor Cassidy Woods (born September 26, 1994) is a Canadian professional ice hockey player and strongwoman who most recently played in the now defunct Premier Hockey Federation (PHF) with the Toronto Six. A defenceman who has also played as a two-way forward, she is both a Clarkson Cup champion and an Isobel Cup champion.

== Playing career ==
Woods began playing in the Saskatchewan Female U18 AAA Hockey League (SFU18AAAHL), the top minor ice hockey league in the province, as a high school freshman with the Notre Dame Hounds of Athol Murray College of Notre Dame. She was the team's top point scorer in her first season, notching 23 points in 28 games, and was a top-three point scorer on the team in the following two seasons. With the Hounds, Woods won gold at the 2011 Esso Cup, Canada's national women's midget hockey championship, in addition to setting a tournament record with 12 assists.

During her senior year, 2011–12, she played in the Junior Women's Hockey League (JWHL) with the Balmoral Hall Blazers of Balmoral Hall School and set a team record for assists in a season, with 41 assists in 30 games.

=== NCAA ===
Woods joined the Cornell Big Red women's ice hockey program in 2012, beginning as a third-line centre and playoff specialist during her rookie NCAA season. She scored in her first game with the university, finishing her rookie year with 22 points, good for third on the team in goals, including a hat-trick in the ECAC Hockey Tournament Semifinal. For her third year with the university, she switched positions to play as a defenceman, before moving back to forward for her senior season. She finished her time at Cornell with 81 points in 131 games and remains the sixth leading all-time short handed scorer for the team.

=== Professional ===
Woods was drafted 23rd overall by the Brampton Thunder in the 2016 CWHL Draft and signed with the team ahead of the 2016–17 season. The team moved from Brampton to Markham, Ontario and were renamed the Markham Thunder in 2017. Woods stuck with the team through the move and won the Clarkson Cup, the Canadian Women's Hockey League (CWHL) championship trophy, with the Thunder in 2018.

The 2018–19 season was her third with the Thunder. Though she didn’t know it at the time, she scored the last regular season goal in league history as the CWHL collapsed in May 2019.

In May 2019, she joined the newly formed Professional Women's Hockey Players Association (PWHPA), which emerged following the collapse of the CWHL. During the 2019–20 PWHPA Dream Gap Tour, she played for Team Johnston at the Unifor Women's Hockey Showcase in September 2019 and for Team Spooner at the Secret Women's Hockey Showcase in January 2020.

She opted to part ways with the PWHPA in April 2020 and signed with the Toronto Six, the first Canadian expansion team of the National Women's Hockey League (NWHL; renamed Premier Hockey Federation (PHF) in 2021), as one of the original five players to join the team, and was named an alternate captain. Her first NWHL goal was scored on January 24, 2021 versus the Minnesota Whitecaps and she scored a total of 4 goals in the six game regular season, shorted due to the COVID-19 pandemic.

Woods resigned with the Six for the 2021–22 PHF season and had the most offensively productive season of her professional career, scoring 3 goals and 14 assists for 17 points in twenty games.

=== International ===
Medal record

Representing Canada

Women's ice hockey

World U18 Championship
Gold medal – first place	2012 Czech Republic	

Woods competed as member of Team Canada at the 2012 IIHF World Women's U18 Championship. She joined a roster filled with other future hockey stars, including Cayley Mercer, Laura Stacey, Erin Ambrose, Emerance Maschmeyer, and future Toronto Six teammate Elaine Chuli. Woods scored Canada’s opening goal of the tournament, in their match against Switzerland, and was named best player of the game by the team. She finished the tournament with three goals and three assists and her performance helped Team Canada sweep the tournament and win gold that year.

== Strongwoman career ==
Woods placed first in the under-64 kg (141 lb) weight category of the 2023 Arnold Amateur Strongwoman World Championship at the Arnold Sports Festival.

== Career statistics ==
=== Regular season and playoffs ===
			Regular season					Playoffs
Season	Team	League	GP	G	A	Pts	PIM	GP	G	A	Pts	PIM
2008–09	Notre Dame Hounds	SFMAAAHL	28	14	9	23		9	1	5	6	4
2009–10	Notre Dame Hounds	SFMAAAHL	28	19	25	44	8	9	9	11	20	8
2010–11	Notre Dame Hounds	SFMAAAHL	28	22	32	54	14	9	11	13	24	12
2011–12	Balmoral Hall Blazers	JWHL	30	21	41	62	2	–	–	–	–	–
2012–13	Cornell Big Red	NCAA	33	11	11	22	32	–	–	–	–	–
2013–14	Cornell Big Red	NCAA	34	9	13	22	27	–	–	–	–	–
2014 -15	Cornell Big Red	NCAA	33	4	16	20	22	–	–	–	–	–
2015–16	Cornell Big Red	NCAA	31	9	8	17	16	–	–	–	–	–
2016–17	Brampton Thunder	CWHL	20	0	4	4	6	–	–	–	–	–
2017–18	Markham Thunder	CWHL	28	4	1	5	18	3	0	0	0	0
2018–19	Markham Thunder	CWHL	26	2	3	5	12	3	0	0	0	0
2019–20	GTA West	PWHPA	–	–	–	–	–	–	–	–	–	–
2020–21	Toronto Six	NWHL	6	4	1	5	10	1	0	0	0	0
2021–22	Toronto Six	PHF	20	3	14	17	12	1	0	1	1	0
2022–23	Toronto Six	PHF	22	0	3	3	8	4	1	0	1	0
NCAA totals			131	33	48	81	97	–	–	–	–	–
CWHL totals			74	6	8	14	36	6	0	0	0	0
PHF totals			48	7	18	25	30	6	1	1	2	0

=== International ===
Year	Team	Event	Result	GP	G	A	Pts	PIM
2012	Canada	WJC	1st place, gold medalist(s)	5	3	3	6	0

== Awards and honors ==
Award	Year
Hockey Canada
Esso Cup Gold Medal	2011
International
World U18 Gold Medal	2012
Cornell Big Red
ECAC Rookie of the Week	November 20, 2012
ECAC All-Tournament Team	2013
All-Ivy Second Team	2016
CWHL
Clarkson Cup Champion	2018
PHF
Isobel Cup Champion	2023
