= Harvard Crimson ice hockey =

Harvard Crimson ice hockey may refer to either of the ice hockey teams that represent Harvard University:

- Harvard Crimson men's ice hockey
- Harvard Crimson women's ice hockey
