= Lyndsey Fry =

American ice hockey player

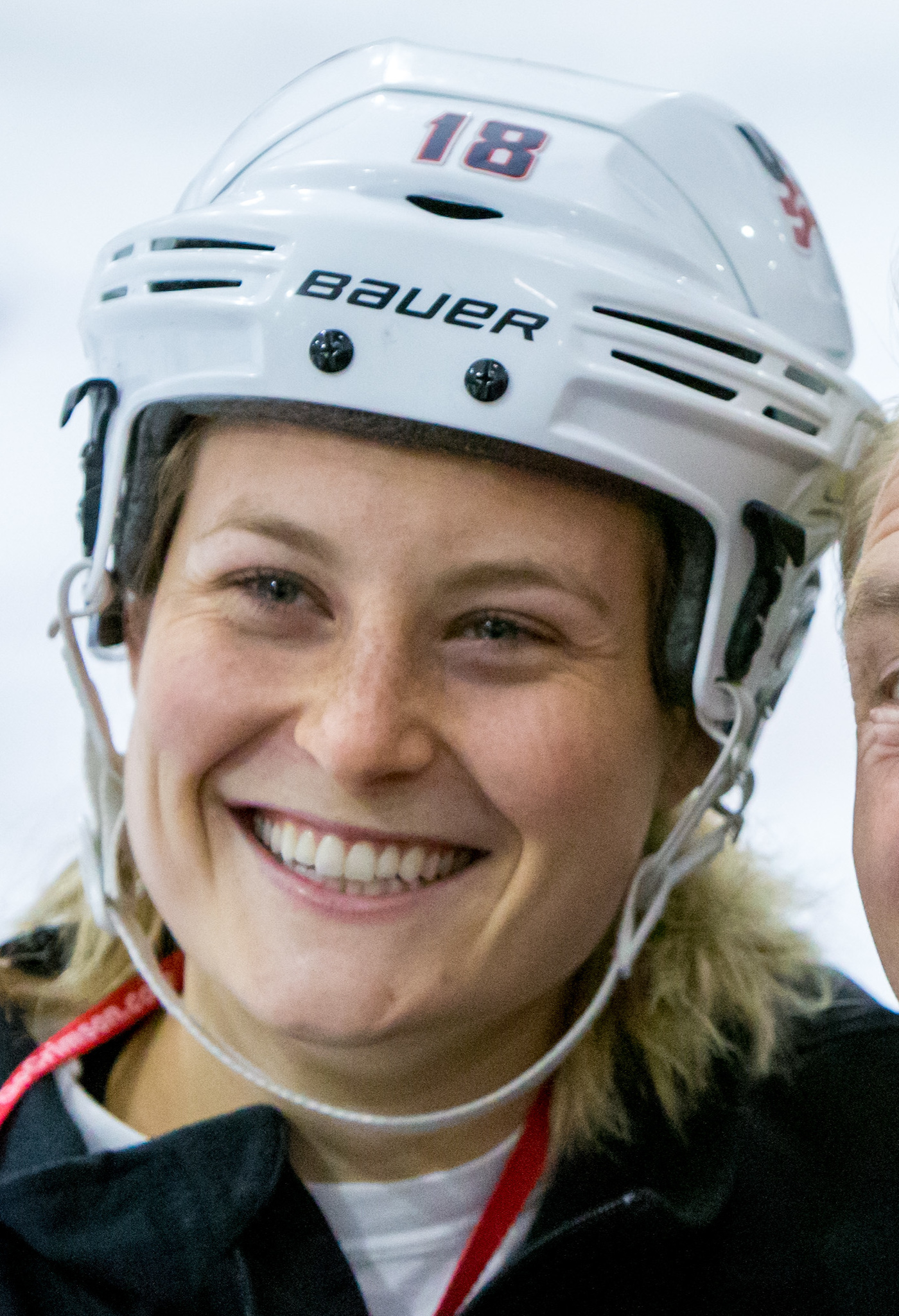
- Fry with the United States in 2016
- Born: October 30, 1992 (age 34) Mesa, Arizona, U.S.
- Height: 5 ft 9 in (175 cm)
- Weight: 170 lb (77 kg; 12 st 2 lb)
- Position: Forward
- Shoots: Right
- NCAA team: Harvard Crimson
- National team: United States
- Playing career: 2010–present
Medal record
Women's ice hockey
Representing United States
Olympic Games
Silver medal – second place	2014 Sochi	Tournament
IIHF World Women's Championships
Gold medal – first place	2013 Canada	Tournament

Lyndsey Fry (born October 30, 1992) is an American retired ice hockey player. She was a member of the United States women's national ice hockey team. Fry was born in Mesa, Arizona, but grew up in Chandler, Arizona. She played college hockey for Harvard University.

Fry competed at the 2014 Winter Olympics in Sochi, Russia, where the USA team won the silver medal.

In January 2021, Fry was announced as part of the Arizona Coyotes radio broadcast team.

== Career stats ==
=== NCAA ===
Season	GP	G	A	Pts	PIM	PPG	SHG	GWG
2010-11	26	6	5	11	12	1	0	1
2011-12	30	22	20	42	24	4	1	5
2012-13	33	16	20	36	8	5	0	5
2014-15	34	6	13	19	16	2	0	1
