= 2011 Esso Cup =

Tournament details
- Venue(s): Servus Credit Union Place in St. Albert, Alberta
- Dates: April 17–23, 2011
- Teams: 6

Final positions
- Champions: Notre Dame Hounds
- Runners-up: Edmonton Thunder
- Third place: Toronto Aeros

Tournament statistics
- Scoring leader(s): Olivia Howe (Notre Dame)

Awards
- MVP: Morgan Glover

The 2011 Esso Cup was Canada's third annual national women's midget hockey championship, played April 17–23, 2011 at the Servus Credit Union Place in St. Albert, Alberta. The Notre Dame Hounds defeated the Edmonton Thunder 5-2 in the gold medal game to win their first Esso Cup title. Edmonton goaltender Morgan Glover was named the tournament's most valuable player.

== Teams ==
| Result | Team | Region | City |
|---|---|---|---|
| 1st place, gold medalist(s) | Notre Dame Hounds | West | Wilcox, SK |
| 2nd place, silver medalist(s) | Edmonton Thunder | Pacific | Edmonton, AB |
| 3rd place, bronze medalist(s) | Toronto Aeros | Ontario | Toronto, ON |
| 4 | Kodiaks du Lac St-Louis | Quebec | Kirkland, QC |
| 5 | St. Albert Slash | Host | St. Albert, AB |
| 6 | King's County Kings | Atlantic | Montague, PE |

== Round robin ==
=== Standings ===
| Pos | Team | Pld | W | OTW | OTL | L | GF | GA | GD | Pts |
|---|---|---|---|---|---|---|---|---|---|---|
| 1 | Edmonton Thunder | 5 | 4 | 1 | 0 | 0 | 19 | 6 | +13 | 14 |
| 2 | Notre Dame Hounds | 5 | 3 | 1 | 1 | 0 | 28 | 8 | +20 | 12 |
| 3 | Toronto Aeros | 5 | 2 | 0 | 1 | 2 | 20 | 13 | +7 | 7 |
| 4 | Kodiaks du Lac St-Louis | 5 | 2 | 0 | 0 | 3 | 11 | 15 | −4 | 6 |
| 5 | St. Albert Slash | 5 | 1 | 1 | 1 | 2 | 13 | 11 | +2 | 6 |
| 6 | King's County Kings | 5 | 0 | 0 | 0 | 5 | 5 | 43 | −38 | 0 |

=== Scores ===
- Lac St-Louis 5 - Kings County 0
- Edmonton 3 - Notre Dame 2 (SO)
- St. Albert 4 - Toronto 3 (SO)
- Notre Dame 6 - Lac St-Louis 0
- Edmonton 4 - Toronto 2
- St. Albert 5 - Kings County 0
- Toronto 5 - Lac St-Louis 1
- Notre Dame 14 - Kings County 0
- Edmonton 1 - St. Albert 0
- Toronto 9 - Kings County 2
- Edmonton 2 - Lac St-Louis 1
- Notre Dame 4 - St. Albert 3 (SO)
- Edmonton 10 - Kings County 0
- Notre Dame 3 - Toronto 1
- Lac St-Louis 4 - St. Albert 2

== Playoffs ==
=== Semi-finals ===
- Notre Dame 5 - Toronto 1
- Edmonton 4 - Lac St-Louis 1

=== Bronze-medal game ===
- Toronto 4 - Lac St-Louis 0

=== Gold-medal game ===
- Notre Dame 5 - Edmonton 2

== Individual awards ==
- Most Valuable Player: Morgan Glover (Edmonton)
- Top Scorer: Olivia Howe (Notre Dame)
- Top Forward: Olivia Howe (Notre Dame)
- Top Defenceman: Emma Korbs (Toronto)
- Top Goaltender: Morgan Glover (Edmonton)
- Most Sportsmanlike Player: Matana Skoye (St. Albert)

== Road to the Esso Cup ==
=== Atlantic Region ===
Regional Tournament held March 31-April 3, 2011 at Montague, Prince Edward Island

==== Round robin ====
| Pos | Team | Pld | W | L | D | GF | GA | GD | Pts |
|---|---|---|---|---|---|---|---|---|---|
| 1 | King's County (host) | 4 | 4 | 0 | 0 | 19 | 10 | +9 | 8 |
| 2 | Bathurst Northern Stars | 4 | 2 | 2 | 0 | 16 | 11 | +5 | 4 |
| 3 | Metro Boston Pizza | 4 | 2 | 2 | 0 | 12 | 10 | +2 | 4 |
| 4 | Western Wind | 4 | 2 | 2 | 0 | 10 | 13 | −3 | 4 |
| 5 | Tri-Pen | 4 | 0 | 4 | 0 | 10 | 23 | −13 | 0 |

==== Championship Game ====
- Kings County 3 - Bathurst 1

Kings County advances to Esso Cup

=== Quebec ===
Dodge Cup Midget Championship held March 31-April 3, 2011 at Kirkland, Quebec

==== Quarter-finals ====
- Pionnières de Laurentides-Lanaudière 3 - Abitibi-Témiscamingue 1
- Kodiacs du Lac St-Louis 4 - Rapides de l'Estrie 1
- L'Express de l'Outaouais 3 - Rebelles de Laval 0
- Remparts du Richelieu 3 - Rafales de la Mauricie 0

==== Semi-finals ====
- Remparts du Richelieu 5 - Pionnières de Laurentides-Lanaudière 0
- Kodiacs du Lac St-Louis 1 - L'Express de l'Outaouais 0

==== Championship Game ====
- Kodiacs du Lac St-Louis 2 - Remparts du Richelieu 0

Lac St-Louis wins Dodge Cup and advances to Esso Cup

=== Ontario ===
Ontario Women's Hockey Association Championship held February 18–20, 2011 at Brampton, Ontario

==== Quarter-finals ====
- Stoney Creek 1 - Whitby 0
- Toronto 4 - Kingston 0
- Kanata 2 - Sarnia 0
- Thunder Bay 3 - Belleville 1

==== Semi-finals ====
- Thunder Bay 3 - Stoney Creek 0
- Toronto 5 - Kanata 2

==== Championship Game ====
- Toronto 4 - Thunder Bay 2

Toronto wins championship and advances to Esso Cup

=== Western Region ===
Best-of-3 series played April 1–3, 2011 at Morden, Manitoba

Notre Dame Hounds vs Pembina Valley Hawks

- Game 1: Notre Dame 3 - Pembina Valley 1
- Game 2: Notre Dame 4 - Pembina Valley 1

Notre Dame wins series and advances to Esso Cup

=== Pacific Region ===
Best-of-3 series played April 1–3, 2011 at Edmonton, Alberta

Thompson-Okanagan Rockets vs Edmonton Thunder

- Game 1: Edmonton 4 - Thompson-Okanagan 1
- Game 2: Edmonton 8 - Thompson-Okanagan 1

Edmonton wins series and advances to Esso Cup

== See also ==
- Esso Cup
