= Emma Buckles =

Canadian ice hockey player (born 1999)

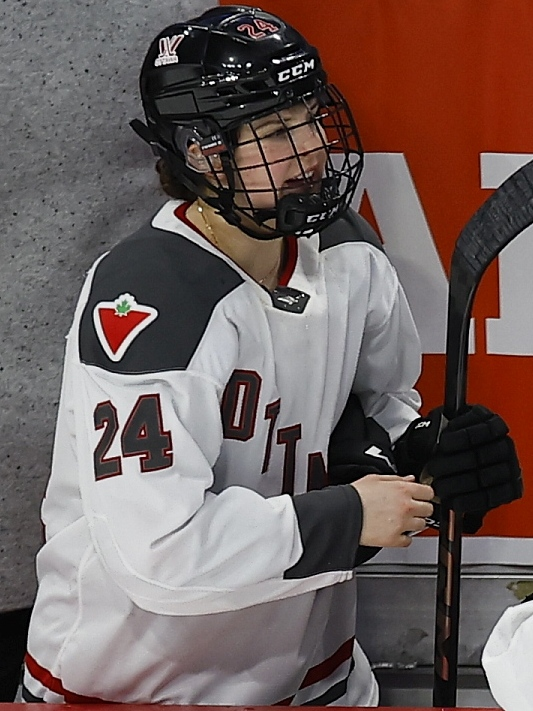
- Buckles with PWHL Ottawa in 2024
- Born: June 10, 1999 (age 27) Toronto, Ontario, Canada
- Height: 5 ft 7 in (170 cm)
- Weight: 152 lb (69 kg; 10 st 12 lb)
- Position: Defence
- Shot: Left
- Played for: PWHL Ottawa
- Playing career: 2017–2024

Emma Buckles (born June 10, 1999) is a Canadian former professional ice hockey defenceman who most recently played for PWHL Ottawa of the Professional Women's Hockey League (PWHL). She played college ice hockey at Harvard.

== Early life ==
Buckles attended Havergal College where she played soccer, volleyball, softball and hockey. She helped lead Havergal's varsity hockey team to three consecutive Hewitt Cups from 2015 to 2017. In grade 9, she helped start the Healthy Active Living club at Havergal. She also played junior ice hockey for the Toronto Aeros junior team.

== Playing career ==
=== College ===
Buckles began her collegiate career at Harvard during the 2017–18 season. During her freshman year, she recorded three goals and ten assists in 30 games. Following the season she was named to the ECAC All-Rookie Team. During the 2018–19 season, in her sophomore year, she recorded three goals and six assists in 32 games, and ranked second on the team with 45 blocked shots. During the 2019–20 season, in her junior year, she recorded one goal and four assists in 29 games.

The Ivy League cancelled the 2020–21 season due to the COVID-19 pandemic. During the 2021–22 season, in her senior year, she recorded a career-high seven goals and ten assists in 37 games. She led all Harvard defenders in goals and points, and ranked third among all ECAC Hockey defenders in goals. Following the season she was named to the ECAC Hockey First-Team All-League and All-Ivy First-Team. She was also named a finalist for the ECAC Hockey's Best Defensemen award.

=== Professional ===
On September 18, 2023, Buckles was drafted in the thirteenth round, 75th overall, by PWHL Boston in the 2023 PWHL Draft. On November 2, 2023, she signed a one-year contract with Boston. Following training camp, she was the final player cut from the team and assigned to the reserve list. After being released by Boston, she signed a one-year contract with PWHL Ottawa on January 31, 2024. During the 2023–24 season, she was scoreless in fifteen games for Ottawa. In October 2024, Buckles announced her retirement.

== International play ==
Medal record

Representing Canada

World U18 Championship
Silver medal – second place	2017 Czech Republic	

Buckles represented Canada at the 2017 IIHF World Women's U18 Championship where she recorded two assists in five games and won a silver medal.

== Career statistics ==
=== Regular season and playoffs ===
			Regular season					Playoffs
Season	Team	League	GP	G	A	Pts	PIM	GP	G	A	Pts	PIM
2017–18	Harvard University	ECAC	30	3	10	13	26	—	—	—	—	—
2018–19	Harvard University	ECAC	32	3	6	9	34	—	—	—	—	—
2019–20	Harvard University	ECAC	29	1	4	5	18	—	—	—	—	—
2021–22	Harvard University	ECAC	32	7	10	17	16	—	—	—	—	—
2022–23	Team Sonnet	PWHPA	20	0	0	0	8	—	—	—	—	—
2023–24	PWHL Ottawa	PWHL	15	0	0	0	0	—	—	—	—	—
PWHL totals			15	0	0	0	0	—	—	—	—	—

=== International ===
Year	Team	Event	Result	GP	G	A	Pts	PIM
2017	Canada	U18	2nd place, silver medalist(s)	5	0	2	2	2
Junior totals				5	0	2	2	2
