= Janine Alder =

Swiss ice hockey player (born 1995)

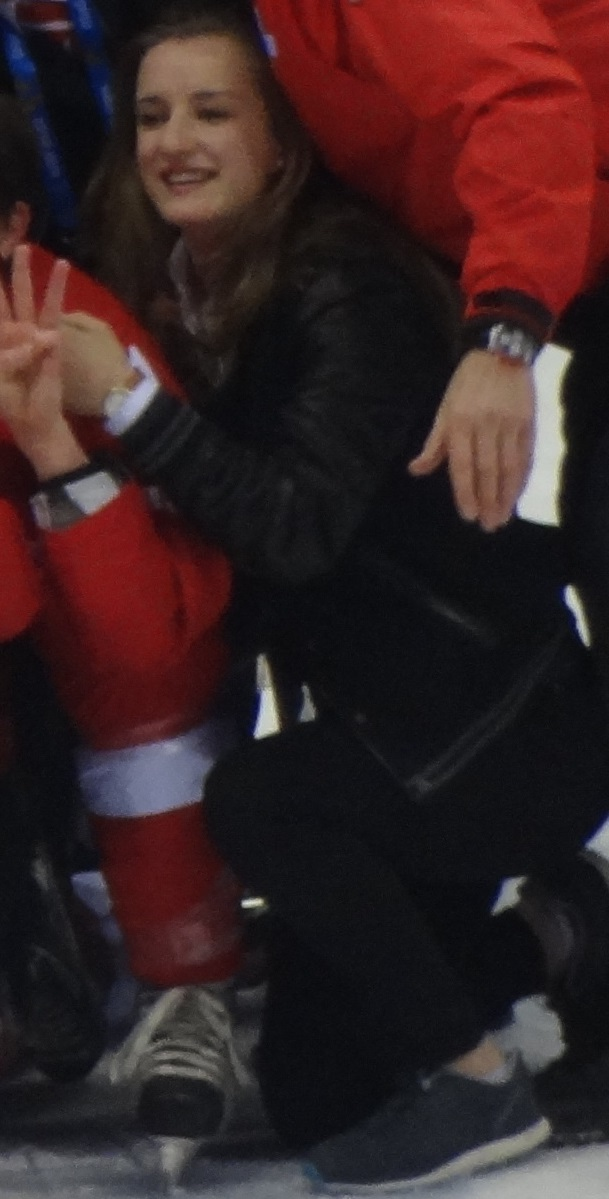
- Born: 5 July 1995 (age 31) Urnäsch, Appenzell Ausserrhoden, Switzerland
- Height: 1.65 m (5 ft 5 in)
- Weight: 55 kg (121 lb; 8 st 9 lb)
- Position: Goaltender
- Catches: Left
- SWHL A team Former teams: HT Thurgau Ladies; St. Cloud State Huskies; EV Dielsdorf; EHC Winterthur; ZSC Lions Frauen
- National team: Switzerland
- Playing career: 2009–present
- Website: janinealder.com
Medal record
Olympic Games
Bronze medal – third place	2014 Sochi	Team

Janine Alder (born 5 July 1995) is a Swiss ice hockey goaltender and member of the Swiss national ice hockey team, currently playing with the Thurgau Ladies of the Swiss Women's League. She has represented Switzerland at many international tournaments, including at the Winter Olympics in 2014 and 2018. At the 2014 Games, she won the bronze medal after Switzerland defeated Sweden in the bronze medal game.

Alder played four years of college ice hockey with the St. Cloud State Huskies women's ice hockey program in the Western Collegiate Hockey Association (WCHA) conference of the NCAA Division I.

== Career statistics ==
=== International ===
Note: GP = Games played; Min, TOI = Minutes played; W = Wins; L = Losses; T,T/OT = Ties; OTL = Overtime losses; GA = Goals-against; GAA = Goals-against average; SO = Shutouts; SV% = Save percentage;

				Regular season
Year	Team	Event	Result	GP	W	L	T/OT	MIN	GA	SO	GAA	SV%
2018	Sweden	OG	5th	1	1	0	0	60:00	0	1	0.00	1.000
