= Briana Mastel =

American ice hockey player (born 1994)

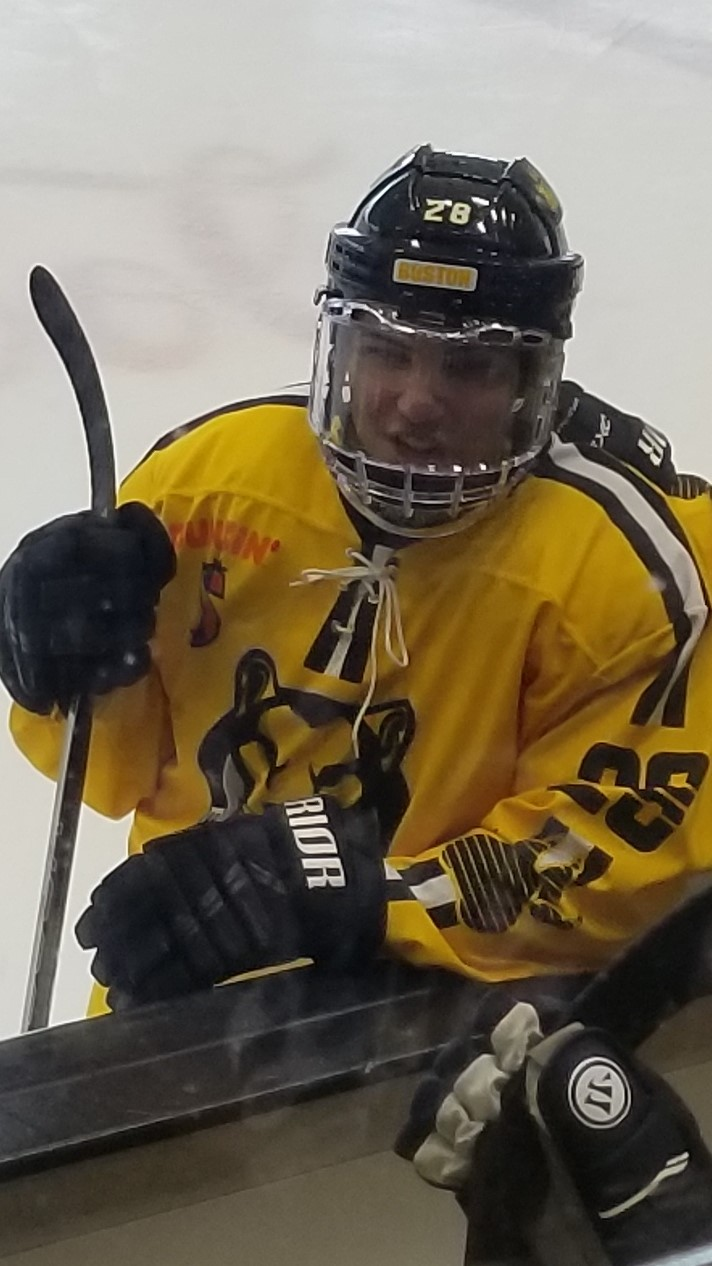
- Briana Mastel playing for the Boston Pride 10-13-19
- Born: November 8, 1994 (age 31) Wallingford, Connecticut, U.S.
- Height: 5 ft 5 in (165 cm)
- Position: Defenseman
- Shoots: Left
- NWHL team Former teams: Boston Pride: Harvard Crimson (NCAA)
- National team: United States
- Playing career: 2013–present

Briana Mastel (born November 8, 1994) is an American ice hockey player who currently plays for the Boston Pride in the National Women's Hockey League.

== Career ==
Mastel played for the Harvard Crimson team from 2013 to 2017, serving as team captain in her final season. As a senior she tied with her Harvard Crimson and future Boston Pride teammate Lexie Laing for the team lead in assists with 13. Across 128 NCAA games, she would score 40 points in four years.

Briana Mastel signed one-year deals with the Boston Pride on July 22, 2019 and October 1, 2020. She played in all 25 regular and post season games for the team. Mastel's playing style has been described as both mobile and a defensive defender.

== Personal life ==
Mastel has a degree in Psychology from Harvard University, with a minor in Spanish. She works as an assistant coach of the East Coast Wizards junior girls team. Mastel also took part in the Boston Bruins Coaching academy as one of eight guest speakers at the 2019 event. She represented the Positive Coaching Alliance at the event that allowed coaches to receive certifications for the USA Hockey coaching education program. Mastel is part of the Take the Lead organization that brings together Boston professional sports teams to tackle racism, inequality and discrimination. She participated in a Take the Lead PSA video to encourage diversity and inclusion.

== Career statistics ==
			Regular Season					Playoffs
Season	Team	League	GP	G	A	Pts	PIM	GP	G	A	Pts	PIM
2013–14	Harvard University	NCAA	33	0	8	8	28	-	-	-	-	-
2014-15	Harvard University	NCAA	34	2	3	5	6	-	-	-	-	-
2015-16	Harvard University	NCAA	32	3	9	12	18	-	-	-	-	-
2016–17	Harvard University	NCAA	29	2	13	15	22	-	-	-	-	-
2019-20	Boston Pride	NWHL	24	1	6	7	4	1	0	0	0	0
2020-21	Boston Pride	NWHL
NWHL totals			24	1	6	7	4	1	0	0	0	0

== Honours ==
- 2016-17 All Ivy League selection
- 2016-17 Dooley Award winner for sportsmanship, enthusiasm, devotion to her team and to hockey
- 2014-17 Named to ECAC Hockey All-Academic team three years in a row
- 2013-14 Named to ECAC All-Rookie Team
- 2012 US National Women's Under 18 Team silver medalist
