= Harvard Crimson women's ice hockey =

- Current season
- University: Harvard University
- Conference: ECAC
- Head coach: Laura Bellamy; 1st season, 0–0–0
- Arena: Bright Hockey Center; Boston, Massachusetts
- Colors: Crimson and White

AWCHA tournament champions
- 1999

NCAA tournament runner-up
- 2003, 2004, 2005, 2015

NCAA tournament Frozen Four
- 2001, 2003, 2004, 2005, 2008, 2015

NCAA tournament appearances
- 2001, 2003, 2004, 2005, 2006, 2007, 2008, 2010, 2013, 2014, 2015, 2022

Conference tournament champions
- 1999, 2004, 2005, 2006, 2007, 2008, 2015

Conference regular season champions
- 1999, 2003, 2004, 2005, 2008, 2009, 2015, 2022

The Harvard Crimson women's ice hockey team represents Harvard University in National Collegiate Athletic Association (NCAA) Division I women's hockey. Harvard competes as a member of the ECAC Conference and plays its home games at the Bright Hockey Center in Boston, Massachusetts.

== History ==
The Harvard Crimson "iced" its first regular season women's hockey team in the 1978–79 season. Their first game was a 17–0 defeat at the hands of the Providence Friars women's ice hockey program. The next game was a 2–1 loss to the Yale Bulldogs women's ice hockey program.

In 1998–99, the Crimson finished with a record of 33–1. Of the 31 wins, the Crimson won 30 consecutive games to close the season. In the previous season, the Crimson went 14–16–0. The final game of that 30 game streak was a 6–5 overtime victory over the New Hampshire Wildcats women's ice hockey program in the American Women's College Hockey Alliance (AWCHA) national championship game. During the season, the Crimson would win the Beanpot and Ivy League title. In addition, the Crimson won their first ECAC regular-season and tournament championships. This would be Katey Stone's first AWCHA national championship.

In 2001, Harvard participated in the inaugural NCAA Championship tournament. On January 18, 2003, Harvard beat the Boston College Eagles women's ice hockey program by a 17–2 mark, the largest margin of victory in NCAA history. Jennifer Botterill set an NCAA record (since tied) for most points in one game with 10. This was accomplished on January 28, 2003 versus Boston College. A few months later, Nicole Corriero tied Botterill's record for most points in one NCAA game with ten. She accomplished the feat on November 7, 2003 versus the Union Dutchwomen. In addition, she holds the NCAA record for most game winning goals in a career with 27. During the 2003–04 season, Nicole Corriero would set an NCAA record with 59 goals scored in a season. On February 26, 2010, head coach Katey Stone became the women’s college hockey all-time wins leader, surpassing former University of Minnesota head coach Laura Halldorson. Laura Bellamy became the Crimson's head coach in August 2023 following Stone's retirement in the aftermath of a hazing and abuse scandal.

== Season-by-season results ==
Note: GP = Games played, W = Wins, L = Losses, T = Ties Records as of July 31, 2009.

Won championship	Lost championship	Conference champions	League leader

Year	Coach	W	L	T	Conference	Conf. W	Conf. L	Conf. T	Finish	Conference Tournament	NCAA / AWCHA Tournament
2022–23	Katey Stone	7	21	3	ECAC	6	13	3	8th ECAC	Lost Quarterfinals vs. Yale (2–4, 0–4)	Did not qualify
2021–22	Katey Stone	22	10	1	ECAC	16	5	1	1st ECAC	Lost Quarterfinals vs. Princeton (2–4, 2–1 OT, 3–2)	Lost First Round vs. Minnesota-Duluth (0–4)
2020–21	DID NOT PLAY DUE TO COVID 19										
2019–20	Katey Stone	18	14	1	ECAC	15	6	1	4th ECAC	Won Quarterfinals vs. Yale (4–0, 3–4 (OT), 4–3 (3OT)	Cancelled
2018–19	Katey Stone	12	15	5	ECAC	9	9	4	7th ECAC	Lost Quarterfinals to Colgate (5–2, 2–4, 2–5)	Did not qualify
2017–18	Katey Stone	13	16	2	ECAC	10	10	2	7th ECAC	Lost Quarterfinals to Colgate (4–6, 1–6)	Did not qualify
2016–17	Katey Stone	5	19	5	ECAC	5	13	4	9th ECAC	Did not qualify	Did not qualify
2015–16	Katey Stone	17	12	3	ECAC	12	7	3	5th ECAC	Lost Quarterfinals vs. Colgate (1–4, 4–1, 2–3 OT)	Did not qualify
2014–15	Katey Stone	27	6	3	ECAC	16	4	2	2nd ECAC	Won Quarterfinals vs. Yale (2–1, 3–0); Won Semifinals vs. Quinnipiac (2–1 OT); Won Championship vs. Cornell (7–3)	Won First Round vs. Quinnipiac (5–0); Won Frozen Four vs. Boston college (2–1); Lost Championship vs. Minnesota (1–4)
2013–14	Maura Crowell	23	7	4	ECAC	16	3	3	2nd ECAC	Won Quarterfinals vs. Yale (2–3 2OT, 3–2 2OT, 4–0); Lost Semifinals vs. Cornell (4–6)	Lost First Round vs. Wisconsin (1–2)
2012–13	Katey Stone	24	7	3	ECAC	17	3	2	3rd ECAC	Won Quarterfinals vs. Dartmouth (4–0, 3–0); Won Semifinals vs. Clarkson (4–2); Lost Championship vs. Cornell (1–2)	Lost First Round vs. Boston College (1–3)
2011–12	Katey Stone	22	9	1	ECAC	17	4	1	2nd ECAC	Won Quarterfinals vs. Princeton (5–3, 4–3 OT); Lost Semifinals vs. St. Lawrence (1–2 OT)	Did not qualify
2010–11	Katey Stone	17	11	4	ECAC	14	5	3	2nd ECAC	Won Quarterfinals vs. St. Lawrence (6–1, 8–3); Lost Semifinals vs. Dartmouth (1–4)	Did not qualify
2009–10	Katey Stone	22	13	6	ECAC	13	6	3	3rd ECAC	Won Quarterfinals vs. Princeton (5–1, 4–2); Lost Semifinals vs. Clarkson (2–3)	Lost First Round vs. Cornell (2–6)
2008–09	Katey Stone	19	10	3	ECAC	16	4	2	1st ECAC	Won Quarterfinals vs. Cornell (3–0, 4–0); Lost Semifinals vs. RPI (2–3 OT)	Did not qualify
2007–08	Katey Stone	32	2	0	ECAC	22	0	0	1st ECAC	Won Quarterfinals vs. Cornell (3–2, 4–2); Won Semifinals vs. Clarkson (3–0); Won Championship vs. St. Lawrence (3–2 OT)	Won First Round vs. Dartmouth (5–1); Lost Frozen Four vs. Wisconsin (1–4)
2006–07	Katey Stone	23	8	2	ECAC	17	4	1	2nd ECAC	Won Quarterfinals vs. Yale (3–1, 2–1); Lost Semifinals vs. St. Lawrence (3–4)	Lost First Round vs. Wisconsin (0–1 4OT)
2005–06	Katey Stone	18	13	4	ECAC	10	6	4	4th ECAC	Won Quarterfinals vs. Clarkson (1–0, 1–2 OT, 2–1 2OT); Won Semifinals vs. St. Lawrence (3–1); Won Championship vs. Brown (4–3)	Lost First Round vs. New Hampshire (1–3)
2004–05	Katey Stone	26	7	3	ECAC	17	1	2	1st ECAC	Won Quarterfinals vs. Clarkson (5–0, 3–1); Won Semifinals vs. Yale (2–1 OT); Won Championship vs. Dartmouth (4–1)	Won First Round vs. Mercyhurst (5–4 3OT); Won Frozen Four vs. St. Lawrence (4–1); Lost Championship vs. Minnesota (3–4)
2003–04	Katey Stone	30	4	1	ECAC	15	3	0	1st ECAC	Won Quarterfinals vs. Cornell (9–1, 4–1); Won Semifinals vs. Brown (2–1 2OT); Won Championship vs. St. Lawrence (6–1)	Won First Round vs. St. Lawrence (2–1); Lost Championship vs. Minnesota (2–6)
2002–03	Katey Stone	30	3	1	ECAC	10	0	1	1st ECAC	Won Quarterfinals vs. Cornell (13–1, 7–0); Won Semifinals vs. Brown (10–3); Lost Championship vs. Dartmouth (2–7)	Won First Round vs. Minnesota (6–1); Lost Championship vs. Minnesota–Duluth (3–4 2OT)
2001–02	Katey Stone	18	11	2	ECAC	9	5	2	4th ECAC	Won Quarterfinals vs. Princeton (3–2, 3–1); Lost Semifinals vs. Dartmouth (2–4)	Did not qualify
2000–01	Katey Stone	24	10	0	ECAC	20	4	0	2nd ECAC	Won Quarterfinals vs. Providence (4–3 OT); Won Semifinals vs. St. Lawrence (7–2); Lost Championship vs. Dartmouth (1–3)	Lost First Round vs. Minnesota–Duluth (3–6)
1999–00	Katey Stone	21	5	3	ECAC	17	4	3	2nd ECAC	Won Quarterfinals vs. St. Lawrence (7–3); Lost Semifinals vs. Dartmouth (2–3 OT)	
1998–99	Katey Stone	33	1	0	ECAC	25	1	0	1st ECAC	Won Quarterfinals vs. Cornell (3–2); Won Semifinals vs. Brown (5–3); Won Championship vs. New Hampshire (6–5 OT)	Won Semifinals vs. Dartmouth (8–1); Won Championship vs. University of New Hampshire (5–4 OT) (Note: Before 2000, the NCAA did not sponsor women's ice hockey; the national championship was contested under the American Women's College Hockey Alliance.)
1997–98	Katey Stone	14	16	0						ECAC Quarterfinals	
1996–97	Katey Stone	10	18	0							
1995–96	Katey Stone	9	17	1							
1994–95	Katey Stone	12	11	2						ECAC Quarterfinals	
1993–94	John Dooley	11	10	2						ECAC Quarterfinals	
1992–93	John Dooley	7	14	2						ECAC Quarterfinals	
1991–92	John Dooley	10	10	0							
1990–91	John Dooley	13	10	1						ECAC Semifinals	
1989–90	John Dooley	10	9	1						ECAC Semifinals	
1988–89	John Dooley	15	8	1						Ivy League Champion	
1987–88	John Dooley	14	8	1						ECAC Semifinals; Ivy League Champion	
1986–87	John Dooley	19	4	0						ECAC Semifinals; Ivy League Champion	
1985–86	John Dooley	12	10	1							
1984–85	John Dooley	13	9	1							
1983–84	John Dooley	12	9	1							
1982–83	John Dooley	11	8	0							
1981–82	John Dooley	15	6	0							
1980–81	Rita Harder	7	12	0							
1979–80	Rita Harder	4	13	0							
1978–79	Joe Bertagna	6	11	1							
1977–78	Joe Bertagna	3	5	0							

== Coaches ==
Katey Stone was the head coach of the Crimson between 1994 and 2023. Her teams accomplished the following:

- Six ECAC regular season titles
- Six ECAC tournament championships
- Seven Ivy League Championships
- 10 Beanpot Championships
- Nine NCAA tournament appearances
- Three NCAA title game appearances
- American Women Hockey Coaches Association (AWCHA) championship (1999)

== Players ==
=== 2022–23 roster ===
As of February 10, 2023.

No.	Nat.	Player	Class	Pos	Height	DoB	Hometown	Previous team
2		Jenna MacDonald	Sophomore	D	5' 11" (1.8 m)	2002-07-04	Walpole, Massachusetts	Rivers School
3		Anne Bloomer (C)	Senior	F	5' 7" (1.7 m)	2000-07-20	Chicago, Illinois	Chicago Young Americans
4		Mia Biotti	Sophomore	D	6' 0" (1.83 m)	2002-07-24	Cambridge, Massachusetts	Buckingham Browne & Nichols School
5		Kayley Crawford	Sophomore	F	5' 4" (1.63 m)	2003-04-26	Shorewood, Minnesota	Minnetonka High School
6		Kyra Willoughby (C)	Senior	D	5' 8" (1.73 m)	1999-10-02	Deephaven, Minnesota	Blake School
7		Rose O'Connor	Sophomore	D	5' 10" (1.78 m)	2000-11-13	Newton, Massachusetts	Phillips Academy
8		Paige Lester	Sophomore	F	5' 6" (1.68 m)	2002-10-23	Oakville, Ontario	Toronto Jr. Aeros
10		Gwyn Lapp	Freshman	F	5' 8" (1.73 m)	2004-03-27	Andover, Massachusetts	Phillips Academy
11		Kristin Della Rovere (C)	Senior	F	5' 10" (1.78 m)	2000-11-30	Caledon East, Ontario	Toronto Leaside Jr. Wildcats
13		Eva Dorr	Sophomore	F	5' 10" (1.78 m)	2002-06-13	Pittsburgh, Pennsylvania	Pittsburgh Penguins Elite
14		Eleanor Winges	Sophomore	D	5' 10" (1.78 m)	2003-01-01	North Oaks, Minnesota	Dallas Stars Elite
15		Sophie Ensley	Freshman	F	5' 6" (1.68 m)	2004-01-26	Sudbury, Massachusetts	Noble and Greenough School
17		Ellie Bayard	Sophomore	F	5' 6" (1.68 m)	2002-12-18	Medfield, Massachusetts	Noble and Greenough School
18		Hannah Chorske	Sophomore	F	5' 10" (1.78 m)	2002-11-15	Edina, Minnesota	Edina High School
19		Jade Arnone	Freshman	D	5' 10" (1.78 m)	2004-05-04	Sherborn, Massachusetts	St. Paul's School
21		Kate Kasica	Freshman	D	5' 7" (1.7 m)	2004-07-13	Minneapolis, Minnesota	Blake School
22		Shannon Hollands	Junior	F	5' 7" (1.7 m)	2001-06-26	Uxbridge, Ontario	Toronto Jr. Aeros
26		Gabi Davidson Adams	Sophomore	F	5' 7" (1.7 m)	2002-01-01	Cornwall, Ontario	Ontario Hockey Academy
29		Alex Pellicci	Sophomore	G	5' 10" (1.78 m)	2003-03-12	Prior Lake, Minnesota	Prior Lake High School
30		Daisy Boynton	Sophomore	G	5' 8" (1.73 m)	2002-06-18	Concord, Massachusetts	Middlesex School

=== Players with international experience ===
- Jennifer Botterill, Team Canada
- Caitlin Cahow, Team USA
- Julie Chu, Team USA
- Jillian Dempsey, Team USA
- Lyndsey Fry, Team USA
- Michelle Picard, Team USA
- Josephine Pucci, Team USA
- Angela Ruggiero, Team USA
- Tammy Lee Shewchuk, Team Canada
- Sarah Vaillancourt, Team Canada
- Jamie Hagerman, Team USA

== Championships ==
- 1-time women's national champions (1999, crowned by AWCHA, pre-dated NCAA Women's "Frozen Four")
- 6-time ECAC women's champions (1999, 2004–08)
- 5-time ECAC women's regular-season champions (1999, 2003–05, 2008)
- 10-time Ivy League Champion (1987–89, 1999, 2003, 2005, 2008–09, 2013–14)

== Beanpot championships ==
- 1982
- 1983
- 1992
- 1995
- 1999
- 2000
- 2001
- 2002
- 2003
- 2004
- 2005
- 2008
- 2010
- 2015
- 2022

== Notable players ==
Jennifer Botterill is the only player to have won the Patty Kazmaier Award twice.

- Jennifer Botterill
- Julie Chu
- Lyndsey Fry
- Allison Mleczko
- Michelle Picard
- Josephine Pucci
- Angela Ruggiero
- Emerance Maschmeyer

== Career scoring ==
Player	GP	G	A	Pts
Julie Chu	129	88	196	284
Nicole Corriero	136	150	115	265
Sarah Vaillancourt	118	105	129	234
Jennifer Botterill	62	89	101	190
Jenny Brine	130	77	66	143
Tammy Shewchuk	31	29	46	75

== Awards and honors ==
- Ashley Banfield, Defense, 2002 ECAC North All-Rookie Team
- Cori Bassett, Senior, Defense, 2010 Honorable Mention
- Jennifer Botterill, 1999 American Women's College Hockey Alliance All-Americans, First Team
- Jennifer Botterill, AHCA First Team All-American, 2003
- Jennifer Botterill, Patty Kazmaier Award Winner, 2001
- Jennifer Botterill, Patty Kazmaier Award Winner, 2003
- Jenny Brine, Honorable Mention All-Ivy League, 2007–08, Forward, Harvard (Junior)
- Caitlin Cahow, 2006–07 ECAC Coaches Preseason All-League Selection
- Caitlin Cahow, 2008 ECAC Tournament Most Valuable Player,
- Caitlin Cahow, First Team All-Ivy League, 2007–08, Defenseman, Harvard (Senior), Unanimous selection
- Julie Chu, 2006–07 ECAC Coaches Preseason All-League Selection
- Julie Chu, 2006–07 ECAC Media Preseason All-League Selection
- Julie Chu, AHCA Second Team All-American
- Julie Chu, NCAA Frozen Four All-Tournament Team
- Nicole Corriero, Forward, 2001–02 New England Hockey Writers Women's Division I All-Star Team
- Nicole Corriero, Forward, 2002 ECAC North All-Rookie Team
- Nicole Corriero, Forward, 2002 ECAC North Second Team
- Nicole Corriero, 2002 ECAC-North Rookie of the Year
- Nicole Corriero, Beanpot Most Valuable Player (2005)
- Nicole Corriero, 2005 Sarah Devens Award
- Nicole Corriero, 2005 ECAC Player of the Year
- Nicole Corriero, 2005 ECAC Tournament Most Valuable Player,
- Nicole Corriero, 2005 Ivy League Player of the Year
- Nicole Corriero, 2005 First team All-ECAC
- Nicole Corriero, 2005 First Team All-Ivy
- Nicole Corriero, Most Outstanding Player at the 2005 ECAC Women’s Hockey League Championships.
- Randi Griffin, ECAC Offensive Player of the Week (Week of February 22, 2010)
- Sue Guay, Beanpot Most Valuable Player (1991)
- Jamie Hagerman, Defense, 2001–02 New England Hockey Writers Women's Division I All-Star Team
- Jamie Hagerman, Defense, 2002 All-ECAC North Honorable Mention
- Christina Kessler, Bertagna Award (top goalie at Beanpot)
- Christina Kessler, First Team All-Ivy League, 2007–08, Defenseman, Harvard (Sophomore)
- Christina Kessler, 2009 Second Team All-ECAC
- Christina Kessler, Goaltender, Senior, 2010 Honorable Mention
- Kalen Ingram, Forward, 2001–02 New England Hockey Writers Women's Division I All-Star Team
- Kalen Ingram, Forward, 2002 ECAC North Second Team
- Alison Kuusisto, Bertagna Award (top goalie at Beanpot)
- Anna McDonald, 2010 Frozen Four Skills Competition participant
- A.J. Mleczko, 1999 American Women's College Hockey Alliance All-Americans, First Team
- A.J. Mleczko, Beanpot Most Valuable Player (1999)
- A.J. Mleczko, Patty Kazmaier Award Winner, 1999
- Josephine Pucci, 2010–11 New England Women's Division I All-Stars
- Angela Ruggiero, 1999 American Women's College Hockey Alliance All-Americans, First Team
- Angela Ruggiero AHCA First Team All-American
- Angela Ruggiero, NCAA Frozen Four All-Tournament Team
- Angela Ruggiero, Top Three Finalist for 2003 Patty Kazmaier Award
- Angela Ruggiero, Patty Kazmaier Award Winner, 2004
- Angela Ruggiero, 2004 ECAC Tournament Most Valuable Player,
- Katey Stone, AWCHA Women’s Coach of the Year (1999)
- Tammy Lee Shewchuk, 1999, 2000, 2001 ECAC All-Tournament team
- Tammy Lee Shewchuk, 1999 American Women's College Hockey Alliance All-Americans, First Team
- Tammy Lee Shewchuk, Top Three Finalist for 2001 Patty Kazmaier Award
- Cheryl Tate, Beanpot Most Valuable Player (1982, 1983)
- Sarah Vaillancourt, Top 10 Finalist for 2007 Patty Kazmaier Award
- Sarah Vaillancourt, Patty Kazmaier Award Winner, 2008
- Sarah Vaillancourt, Forward, First Team All-Ivy League, 2007–08, Harvard (Junior), Unanimous selection
- Sarah Vaillancourt, Ivy League Player of the Year 2007–08, Harvard (Junior), Unanimous selection
- Sarah Vaillancourt, 2009 First Team All-ECAC

=== Ivy League Awards ===
- Sandra Whyte, Ivy League Player of the Year (1990)
- Sandra Whyte, Ivy League Player of the Year (1991)

==== All-Ivy ====
- Kate Buesser, Forward, Junior, 2010 First Team All-Ivy
- Cori Bassett, Senior, Defense, 2010 Ivy League Honorable Mention
- Leanna Coskren, Defense, Junior, 2010 Second Team All-Ivy
- Jillian Dempsey, Forward, Freshman, 2010 Second Team All-Ivy
- Becca Gilmore, 2017–18 Second Team All-Ivy
- Kat Hughes, 2017–18 Honorable Mention All-Ivy
- Dominique Petrie, 2019–20 Second Team All-Ivy
- Lindsay Reed, 2018–2019 First Team All-Ivy
- Kristin Della Rovere, 2019–20 Honorable Mention All-Ivy
- Ali Peper, 2019–20 Honorable Mention All-Ivy
- Becky Dutton, 2019–20 Honorable Mention All-Ivy
- Kristin Della Rovere, 2021–22 First Team All-Ivy
- Emma Buckles, 2021–22 First Team All-Ivy
- Zoe Boosamra, 2025-26 All-Ivy Honorable Mention
- Ainsley Tuffy, 2025-26 All-Ivy Honorable Mention

=== Beanpot Awards ===
- Sandra Whyte, Beanpot Most Valuable Player (1992)
- Erin Villotte, Beanpot Most Valuable Player (1995)
- Jennifer Botterill, Beanpot Most Valuable Player, 2000
- Jennifer Botterill, Beanpot Most Valuable Player, 2001
- Tracy Catlin, Beanpot Most Valuable Player (2002)
- Jennifer Botterill, Beanpot Most Valuable Player, 2003
- Sarah Wilson, Beanpot Most Valuable Player (2008)

==== Bertagna Award ====
- Ali Boe, Bertagna Award (top goalie at Beanpot)
- Lindsay Reed, Bertagna Award (top goalie Beanpot)

=== ECAC Awards ===
- Lindsay Charlebois, 2004 Sarah Devens Award
- Sarah Vaillancourt, 2009 ECAC Player of the Year

==== All-ECAC ====
- Jenny Brine, 2009 Third Team All-ECAC
- Lindsay Reed, 2019 Second Team All-ECAC
- Kristin Della Rovere, 2022 First Team All-ECAC
- Emma Buckles, 2022 First Team All-ECAC

==== ECAC All-Rookie ====
- Jillian Dempsey, Harvard, 2010 ECAC All-Rookie Team
- Emma Buckles, 2018 ECAC All-Rookie Team
- Becca Gilmore, 2018 ECAC All-Rookie Team
- Lindsay Reed, 2019 ECAC All-Rookie Team

==== ECAC Tournament ====
- Sarah Wilson, 2006 ECAC Tournament Most Valuable Player,

=== Statistical leaders ===
- Jennifer Botterill, NCAA leader, 2000–01 season, Goals per game, 2.60
- Jennifer Botterill, NCAA leader, 2002–03 season, Goals per game, 3.50
- Tammy Shewchuk, NCAA leader, 2000–01 season, Assists per game, 1.48

== Crimson in professional hockey ==
= CWHL All-Star	= NWHL All-Star	= Clarkson Cup Champion	= Isobel Cup Champion

Player	Position	Team(s)	League(s)	Years	Clarkson Cup	Isobel Cup
Jennifer Botterill	Forward	Mississauga Chiefs (2007–10); Toronto Furies (2010–11)	CWHL			
Caitlin Cahow	Defense	Minnesota Whitecaps; Boston Blades	WWHL; CWHL		1 (2013)	
Julie Chu	Forward	Minnesota Whitecaps; Canadiennes de Montreal	WWHL; CWHL		4 (2010 Playoff MVP, 2011, 2012, 2017	
Miye D'Oench	Forward	Metropolitan Riveters	NWHL	3		2018
Jillian Dempsey	Defense	Boston Blades; Boston Pride	CWHL; NWHL		1 (2015)	2 (2016, 2021)
Christina Kessler	Goaltender	Burlington Barracudas; Toronto Furies	CWHL		1 (2014) Playoff MVP	
Lexie Laing	Forward	Boston Pride	NWHL			1 (2021)
Emerance Maschmeyer	Goaltender	Calgary Inferno; Canadiennes de Montreal; Dream Gap Tour	CWHL; PWHPA			
Briana Mastel	Defense	Boston Pride	NWHL			1 (2021)
Mary Parker	Forward	Boston Pride	NWHL			1 (2021)
Michelle Picard	Forward	Metropolitan Riveters	NWHL			

Player	Team	League
Jenny Brine	Mississauga Chiefs; Toronto Furies	CWHL
Angela Ruggiero	Minnesota Whitecaps; Montreal Axion; Boston Blades	WWHL; NWHL; CWHL

== See also ==
- Harvard Crimson men's ice hockey
- Harvard Crimson
- List of college women's ice hockey coaches with 250 wins (Katey Stone ranks fourth on all-time list)
