= 2022–23 PWHPA season =

- League: Professional Women's Hockey Players Association
- Sport: Ice hockey
- Duration: October 2022 – March 2023
- Teams: 4 teams
- Secret Cup champion: Team Harvey's
- Runners-up: Team Scotiabank
- Top scorer: Marie-Philip Poulin

Championship Weekend

Secret Cup Final
- Champions: Team Harvey's
- Runners-up: Team Scotiabank
- Finals MVP: Emily Clark

PWHPA seasons
- ← 2021–22

The 2022–23 PWHPA season was the fourth and final season of exhibition games organized by the Professional Women's Hockey Players Association (PWHPA) as part of the Dream Gap Tour. The season took place from October 2022 to March 2023 and featured a more structured format than previous seasons, with four teams competing for season-long standings culminating in a championship weekend. Team Harvey's won the Secret Cup, defeating Team Scotiabank 5–4 in the final.

== Background ==
Following three seasons of Dream Gap Tour events, the PWHPA entered its 2022–23 season with renewed momentum and an enhanced competitive structure. The association continued its mission to advocate for a sustainable professional women's hockey league while organizing competitive showcase events.

The season marked a significant evolution in the PWHPA's approach. For the first time, games throughout the season would count toward overall standings rather than each tour stop being a standalone tournament. The season would culminate in a championship weekend to determine the winner of the Secret Cup.

Throughout the season, speculation continued about the imminent formation of a new professional league. The PWHPA stated it was pursuing creating a paid professional league but was "under NDA with potential partners."

== Season format ==
The 2022–23 season featured several significant format changes designed to increase competitiveness and provide more opportunities for players:

- Four region-agnostic teams: Unlike previous seasons where teams were based in regional hubs, the 2022–23 season featured four teams with rosters constructed through a player ranking system rather than geography
- Season-long standings: For the first time, games throughout the season accumulated points toward overall standings
- Championship weekend: The season culminated in a playoff format to determine the Secret Cup champion
- Expanded schedule: The season featured more games than any previous PWHPA season

=== Teams ===
The four teams competing in the 2022–23 season were:

- Team Adidas – 25 players
- Team Harvey's – 25 players, coached by Danièle Sauvageau and Kori Cheverie
- Team Scotiabank – 25 players
- Team Sonnet – 25 players

Each team featured 25 players for a total of 100 players across the organization.

== Training hubs ==
The PWHPA maintained five training hubs across North America where players could practice:

- Boston – Massachusetts
- Calgary – Alberta
- Minnesota – Minnesota
- Montreal – Quebec
- Toronto – Ontario

Players trained at these hubs but were assigned to teams based on rankings rather than geographic location, allowing for more balanced rosters.

== Season schedule ==
The 2022–23 Dream Gap Tour featured the most extensive schedule in PWHPA history, with stops across Canada and the United States.

=== Fall/Winter tour stops ===
- Montreal, Quebec – October 15–16, 2022
- Truro, Nova Scotia – November 4–6, 2022
- Pittsburgh, Pennsylvania – November 25–27, 2022 (in partnership with the Pittsburgh Penguins)
- Ottawa, Ontario – December 9–11, 2022 (All-Star Weekend at Canadian Tire Centre)
- Collingwood and Owen Sound, Ontario – January 21–22, 2023 (broadcast on Sportsnet as part of Hockey Day in Canada)
- Peterborough, St. Catharines, Barrie, and Kitchener, Ontario – February 10–12, 2023 (in partnership with the Ontario Hockey League)
- Tampa Bay, Florida – February 24–26, 2023 (in partnership with the Tampa Bay Lightning)
- Arlington, Virginia – March 4–5, 2023 (in partnership with the Washington Capitals)

=== Championship Weekend ===
The championship weekend took place March 10–12, 2023, in Southern California in partnership with the Los Angeles Kings, Anaheim Ducks, Seattle Kraken, Coachella Valley Firebirds, and Oak View Group.

- Semi-finals – March 10, 2023 (FivePoint Arena at Great Park Ice, Irvine, California)
  - Team Harvey's 2, Team Sonnet 1 (OT) – Emily Clark scored the overtime winner
  - Team Scotiabank 4, Team Adidas 3 (OT) – Blayre Turnbull scored the overtime winner
- Third-place game – March 11, 2023 (Toyota Sports Performance Center, El Segundo, California)
  - Team Adidas 3, Team Sonnet 2 (OT)
- Championship Final – March 12, 2023 (Acrisure Arena, Palm Desert, California)
  - Team Harvey's 5, Team Scotiabank 4

== Championship Final ==
The Secret Cup championship final was played on March 12, 2023, at Acrisure Arena in Palm Desert, California, home of the Coachella Valley Firebirds. Team Harvey's, the top-seeded team, faced Team Scotiabank in a dramatic final. Team Scotiabank took an early 2–0 lead, but Team Harvey's battled back. Emily Clark scored a hat trick for Team Harvey's, including the go-ahead goal in the second period. Jessie Eldridge scored the game-winning goal with 42.1 seconds remaining in regulation to give Team Harvey's a thrilling 5–4 victory.

The Secret Cup was presented by PWHPA operations consultant Jayna Hefford and tennis legend Billie Jean King. Emily Clark was named the game's first star after her four-point performance.

== Partnerships and sponsorships ==
The 2022–23 season saw unprecedented growth in partnerships and support:

=== NHL and professional hockey partnerships ===
The season featured partnerships with eight NHL teams, one AHL team, and the Ontario Hockey League:

- Pittsburgh Penguins – Hosted games at UPMC Lemieux Sports Complex
- Washington Capitals – Hosted games for the second consecutive year at MedStar Capitals Iceplex
- Tampa Bay Lightning – First-time partner, hosted games at AdventHealth Center Ice
- Los Angeles Kings – Co-hosted championship weekend
- Anaheim Ducks – Co-hosted championship weekend
- Seattle Kraken – Supported championship weekend
- Toronto Maple Leafs – Continued partnership
- Ottawa Senators – Hosted All-Star Weekend at Canadian Tire Centre
- Coachella Valley Firebirds (AHL) – Hosted championship final at Acrisure Arena
- Ontario Hockey League – Partnership for four-game weekend across Ontario

=== Corporate sponsors ===
- Secret – Title sponsor of the Dream Gap Tour
- Billie Jean King Enterprises – Continued advisory partnership
- Canadian Tire – Partnership and All-Star Weekend sponsor
- Scotiabank – Team sponsor and Hockey Day in Canada partner
- Adidas – Team sponsor *Harvey's – Team sponsor *Sonnet Insurance – Team sponsor

=== Media coverage ===
The season featured expanded media coverage with live streaming of all games on CBC Sports platforms (CBC Sports website, CBC Sports app, CBC Gem, and CBC Sports' YouTube channel). Select games were also broadcast on Sportsnet and TSN/RDS.

== Notable achievements ==
The 2022–23 season set several milestones for the PWHPA:

- Record attendance: A single-game attendance record of 4,301 fans in Niagara, Ontario
- Most games played: The season featured more games than any previous PWHPA season
- First All-Star Game: An All-Star skills competition and 3-on-3 tournament took place in Ottawa
- Television deals: Enhanced broadcast partnerships with Canadian networks
- Season-long competition: First season with cumulative standings leading to playoffs

== Impact and significance ==
The 2022–23 season proved to be a watershed moment for the PWHPA and women's professional hockey:

=== Final Dream Gap Tour season ===
According to PWHPA operations consultant Jayna Hefford, "The 2022-23 PWHPA season was our biggest and best yet." The season demonstrated the viability and marketability of elite women's hockey with increased attendance, media coverage, and professional partnerships.

With the formation of the Professional Women's Hockey League (PWHL) announced for 2024, the 2022–23 season became the final Dream Gap Tour, marking the end of the PWHPA's four-year journey as a touring exhibition organization.

=== Players union formation ===
In February 2023, during the season, the PWHPA organized a formal labour union—the Professional Women's Hockey League Players Association (PWHLPA)—to negotiate a collective bargaining agreement (CBA) for the new league. This represented a major step toward the PWHPA's ultimate goal of establishing a sustainable professional league.

=== Transition to the PWHL ===
Following the season, the PWHPA's efforts culminated in the June 30, 2023 announcement that Mark Walter and Billie Jean King's group had purchased the Premier Hockey Federation (PHF), paving the way for a unified professional league. The Professional Women's Hockey League was officially announced in August 2023 and began play in January 2024, fulfilling the PWHPA's mission.

== Notable players ==
The 2022–23 season featured over 100 of the world's top women's hockey players, including nearly every North American Olympian who had missed the previous season due to Olympic centralization. Notable players included:

- Marie-Philip Poulin (Team Harvey's) – Leading scorer
- Hilary Knight (Team Sonnet)
- Kendall Coyne Schofield (Team Adidas) – PWHPA President
- Brianne Jenner (Team Sonnet) *Sarah Nurse (Team Adidas)
- Emily Clark (Team Harvey's) – Championship Final MVP
- Jessie Eldridge (Team Harvey's) – Championship-winning goal scorer
- Ann-Renée Desbiens (Team Harvey's) *Amanda Kessel (Team Adidas)
- Natalie Spooner
- Blayre Turnbull (Team Scotiabank)
- Megan Keller (Team Scotiabank) *Abby Roque

== Legacy ==
The 2022–23 season marked the successful conclusion of the PWHPA's four-year campaign to establish a sustainable professional women's hockey league. The organization's persistence in advocating for proper infrastructure, compensation, and support for women's hockey culminated in the formation of the PWHL, which began play in January 2024 with six teams and a comprehensive collective bargaining agreement.

The Dream Gap Tour's final season demonstrated that there was significant demand for elite women's hockey, with record attendance, extensive media coverage, and unprecedented partnership support from NHL organizations and corporate sponsors. These achievements validated the PWHPA's approach and set the foundation for the successful launch of the PWHL.
