= 2023–24 PWHL New York season =

Professional Women's Hockey League season

2023–24 PWHL New York
- 2023–24 record: 5–4–3–12 (6th)
- Home record: 3–1–1–7
- Road record: 2–3–2–5
- Goals for: 53
- Goals against: 67

Team information
- General manager: Pascal Daoust
- Coach: Howie Draper
- Assistant coach: Laura Brennan; Colton Orr; Mike Sommer
- Captain: Micah Zandee-Hart
- Alternate captains: Alex Carpenter; Ella Shelton
- Arena: Total Mortgage Arena, UBS Arena, Prudential Center
- Average attendance: 2,496

Team leaders
- Goals: Alex Carpenter; Jade Downie-Landry (8)
- Assists: Alex Carpenter (15)
- Points: Alex Carpenter (23)
- Penalty minutes: Abby Roque (31)
- Plus/minus: Savannah Norcross (+2)
- Wins: Corinne Schroeder (7)
- Goals against average: Lindsey Post (1.61)

The 2023–24 PWHL New York season was the team's inaugural season as a member of the newly created Professional Women's Hockey League (PWHL). They played their home games at Total Mortgage Arena in Bridgeport, Connecticut, and UBS Arena in Elmont, New York.

New York finished in last place and failed to make the playoffs. Their performance secured the team the first overall pick at the 2024 PWHL draft.

== Offseason ==
On September 1, 2023, New York hired Pascal Daoust as its general manager, before naming Howie Draper the team's first head coach on September 15. In November, it was announced that the team would play the majority of its games at Total Mortgage Arena in Bridgeport, with select games hosted at UBS Arena in Elmont.

On September 8, New York announced the signings of its first three players, Alex Carpenter, Abby Roque, and Micah Zandee-Hart. Zandee-Hart was named team captain, with Carpenter and Ella Shelton named assistant captains.

== Standings ==
Pos	Team	Pld	W	OTW	OTL	L	GF	GA	GD	Pts	Qualification
1	Toronto (Y)	24	13	4	0	7	69	50	+19	47	Playoffs
2	Montreal (X)	24	10	3	5	6	60	57	+3	41	Playoffs
3	Boston (X)	24	8	4	3	9	50	57	−7	35 (Note: Greater number of games won, excluding games won by Shootout: Boston 11 wins, Minnesota 10 wins)	Playoffs
4	Minnesota (X)	24	8	4	3	9	54	54	0	35	Playoffs
5	Ottawa (E)	24	8	1	6	9	62	63	−1	32	
6	New York (E)	24	5	4	3	12	53	67	−14	26	

Updated to match(es) played on May 5, 2024. Source: PWHL
(E) Eliminated; (X) Clinched playoff berth; (Y) Clinched first place

== Schedule and results ==
=== Regular season ===
New York played in the PWHL's inaugural game against PHWL Toronto on January 1, 2024. The game was hosted at Toronto's Mattamy Athletic Centre. New York won the match by a score of 4–0, with Ella Shelton scoring the franchise and league's first goal and Corinne Shroeder recording the shutout. The team hosted its first home game in Bridgeport on January 5, losing a rematch against Toronto by a score of 3–2. New York's first game at UBS Arena took place on January 10, with visiting PWHL Montréal recording a 5–2 victory.

New York was eliminated from playoff contention after a 5–2 loss against Montréal on April 24. On April 30, New York overcame a 3–0 deficit to defeat PWHL Ottawa and secure the first overall selection in the 2024 PWHL draft.

=== Regular season schedule ===
The regular season schedule was published on November 30, 2023.

Regular season schedule (Home: 3–1–1–7; Road: 2–3–2–5)
January: 2–1–1–4, 9 points (Home: 0–0–1–2; Road: 2–1–0–2)

Game	Date	Opponent	Score	OT	Decision	Location	Attendance	Record	Points	Recap
1	January 1	@ PWHL Toronto	4–0		Schroeder	Mattamy Athletic Centre	2,537	1–0–0–0	3	
2	January 5	PWHL Toronto	2–3		Levy	Total Mortgage Arena	2,152	1–0–0–1	3	
3	January 10	PWHL Montreal	2–5		Schroeder	UBS Arena	2,201	1–0–0–2	3	
4	January 14	@ PWHL Minnesota	3–2	OT	Schroeder	Xcel Energy Center	7,951	1–1–0–2	5	
5	January 16	@ PWHL Montreal	2–3		Levy	Place Bell	6,334	1–1–0–3	5	
6	January 20	@ PWHL Boston	4–1		Schroeder	Tsongas Center	4,007	2–1–0–3	8	
7	January 26	@ PWHL Toronto	0–2		Schroeder	Mattamy Athletic Centre	2,506	2–1–0–4	8	
8	January 28	PWHL Minnesota	1–2	OT	Levy	Total Mortgage Arena	2,393	2–1–1–4	9	

February: 0–3–1–1, 7 points (Home: 0–1–0–0; Road: 0–2–1–1)

Game	Date	Opponent	Score	OT	Decision	Location	Attendance	Record	Points	Recap
9	February 4	@ PWHL Ottawa	4–3	OT	Schroeder	TD Place Arena	8,062	2–2–1–4	11	
10	February 17	@ PWHL Boston	2–1	OT	Schroeder	Tsongas Center	4,002	2–3–1–4	13	
11	February 21	PWHL Montreal	3–2	SO	Levy	UBS Arena	2,128	2–4–1–4	15	
12	February 23	@ PWHL Toronto	1–2	SO	Schroeder	Mattamy Athletic Centre	2,494	2–4–2–4	16	
13	February 28	@ PWHL Ottawa	2–4		Levy	TD Place Arena	6,889	2–4–2–5	16	

March: 1–0–1–4, 4 points (Home: 1–0–0–3; Road: 0–0–1–1)

Game	Date	Opponent	Score	OT	Decision	Location	Attendance	Record	Points	Recap
14	March 3	PWHL Minnesota	0–2		Schroeder	UBS Arena	4,459	2–4–2–6	16	
15	March 6	PWHL Montreal	3–4		Schroeder	Total Mortgage Arena	728	2–4–2–7	16	
16	March 10	@ PWHL Boston	2–3	OT	Levy	Tsongas Center	4,607	2–4–3–7	17	
17	March 16	@ PWHL Minnesota	1–5		Schroeder	Xcel Energy Center	9,006	2–4–3–8	17	
18	March 20	PWHL Ottawa	0–3		Levy	Total Mortgage Arena	1,702	2–4–3–9	17	
19	March 25	PWHL Boston	3–2		Schroeder	UBS Arena	2,834	3–4–3–9	20	

April: 1–0–0–3, 3 points (Home: 1–0–0–2; Road: 0–0–0–1)

Game	Date	Opponent	Score	OT	Decision	Location	Attendance	Record	Points	Recap
20	April 20	PWHL Boston	1–2		Schroeder	Prudential Center	5,132	3–4–3–10	20	
21	April 24	@ PWHL Montreal	2–5		Schroeder	Verdun Auditorium	3,232	3–4–3–11	20	
22	April 28	PWHL Toronto	2–6		Levy	UBS Arena	1,668	3–4–3–12	20	
23	April 30	PWHL Ottawa	4–3		Schroeder	Prudential Center	2,992	4–4–3–12	23	

May: 1–0–0–0, 3 points (Home: 1–0–0–0; Road: 0–0–0–0)

Game	Date	Opponent	Score	OT	Decision	Location	Attendance	Record	Points	Recap
24	May 4	PWHL Minnesota	5–2		Post	UBS Arena	1,563	5–4–3–12	26	

Regulation Win (3 points) Overtime/Shootout win (2 points) Overtime/shootout loss (1 point) Regulation Loss (0 points)

== Player statistics ==
= Indicates team leader

= Indicates league leader

As of May 4, 2024

=== Skaters ===
Regular season
Player	GP	G	A	Pts	SOG	+/−	PIM
Alex Carpenter	24	8	15*	23	89	–8	0
Ella Shelton	24	7	14	21	60	–6	12
Jessie Eldridge	24	7	7	14	82	–9	10
Jade Downie-Landry	24	8	5	13	49	–9	18
Abby Roque	24	6	7	13	41	–15	31
Jaime Bourbonnais	24	5	8	13	58	–12	12
Chloe Aurard	21	1	7	8	19	–7	2
Emma Woods	24	2	3	5	30	–7	8
Brooke Hobson	24	1	4	5	19	–6	14
Elizabeth Giguère	24	3	1	4	42	–15	6
Kayla Vespa	23	2	1	3	19	–1	4
Alexandra Labelle	24	1	2	3	23	–2	4
Micah Zandee-Hart	19	0	3	3	29	–18	10
Paetyn Levis	23	0	3	3	32	–3	4
Jill Saulnier	18	1	1	2	23	–5	10
Olivia Zafuto	13	0	1	1	7	+1	4
Savannah Norcross	20	0	1	1	9	+2	2
Madison Packer	23	0	1	1	18	–2	4
Carley Olivier	1	0	0	0	0	0	0
Alexa Gruschow	4	0	0	0	0	–3	4
Johanna Fällman	21	0	0	0	7	–6	2
Taylor Baker	22	0	0	0	11	–1	6

- Tied with Emma Maltais (TOR)

=== Goaltenders ===
Regular season
Player	GP	TOI	W	L	OT	GA	GAA	SA	SV%	SO	G	A	PIM
Corinne Schroeder	15	901:24	7	7	0	36	2.40	511	0.930	1	0	0	0
Abigail Levy	8	469:19	1	5	2	24	3.07	254	0.906	0	0	0	0
Lindsey Post	2	74:31	1	0	0	2	1.61	37	0.946	0	0	0	0

== Awards and honors ==
=== Milestones ===
Regular season
Player	Milestone	Reached
Ella Shelton	1st goal in franchise history	January 1, 2024
Ella Shelton	1st career PWHL goal	January 1, 2024
Ella Shelton	1st career PWHL game	January 1, 2024
Alex Carpenter	1st assist in franchise history	January 1, 2024
Alex Carpenter	1st career PWHL goal	January 1, 2024
Alex Carpenter	1st career PWHL assist	January 1, 2024
Alex Carpenter	1st career PWHL game	January 1, 2024
Jill Saulnier	1st career PWHL goal	January 1, 2024
Jill Saulnier	1st career PWHL game	January 1, 2024
Kayla Vespa	1st career PWHL goal	January 1, 2024
Kayla Vespa	1st career PWHL game	January 1, 2024
Paetyn Levis	1st career PWHL assist	January 1, 2024
Paetyn Levis	1st career PWHL game	January 1, 2024
Chloe Aurard	1st career PWHL assist	January 1, 2024
Chloe Aurard	1st career PWHL goal	January 1, 2024
Jade Downie-Landry	1st career PWHL assist	January 1, 2024
Jade Downie-Landry	1st career PWHL goal	January 1, 2024
Alexandra Labelle	1st career PWHL assist	January 1, 2024
Alexandra Labelle	1st career PWHL goal	January 1, 2024
Jaime Bourbonnais	1st career PWHL assist	January 1, 2024
Jaime Bourbonnais	1st career PWHL goal	January 1, 2024
Olivia Zafuto	1st career PWHL game	January 1, 2024
Taylor Baker	1st career PWHL game	January 1, 2024
Brooke Hobson	1st career PWHL game	January 1, 2024
Jessie Eldridge	1st career PWHL game	January 1, 2024
Abby Roque	1st career PWHL game	January 1, 2024
Elizabeth Giguère	1st career PWHL game	January 1, 2024
Johanna Fällman	1st career PWHL game	January 1, 2024
Emma Woods	1st career PWHL game	January 1, 2024
Savannah Norcross	1st career PWHL game	January 1, 2024
Corinne Schroeder	1st career PWHL game	January 1, 2024
Corinne Schroeder	1st career PWHL win	January 1, 2024
Abby Roque	1st career PWHL goal	January 5, 2024
Emma Woods	1st career PWHL assist	January 5, 2024
Jessie Eldridge	1st career PWHL assist	January 5, 2024
Olivia Zafuto	1st career PWHL assist	January 5, 2024
Abigail Levy	1st career PWHL game	January 5, 2024
Abigail Levy	1st career PWHL loss	January 5, 2024
Jessie Eldridge	1st career PWHL goal	January 10, 2024
Ella Shelton	1st career PWHL assist	January 10, 2024
Abby Roque	1st career PWHL assist	January 10, 2024
Corinne Schroeder	1st career PWHL loss	January 10, 2024
Emma Woods	1st career PWHL goal	January 14, 2024
Emma Woods	1st career overtime goal	January 14, 2024
Alexa Gruschow	1st career PWHL game	January 14, 2024
Jaime Bourbonnais	1st career PWHL goal	January 16, 2024
Ella Shelton	5th career PWHL assist	January 16, 2024
Jade Downie-Landry	1st career PWHL goal	January 20, 2024
Jade Downie-Landry	1st career PWHL hat-trick	January 20, 2024
Kayla Vespa	1st career PWHL assist	January 20, 2024
Micah Zandee-Hart	1st career PWHL assist	January 28, 2024
Alex Carpenter	5th career PWHL goal	February 4, 2024
Madison Packer	1st career PWHL assist	February 17, 2024
Abby Roque	5th career PWHL assist	February 21, 2024
Jaime Bourbonnais	5th career PWHL assist	February 21, 2024
Chloe Aurard	1st career PWHL goal	February 28, 2024
Jessie Eldridge	5th career PWHL goal	March 6, 2024
Elizabeth Giguère	1st career PWHL goal	March 10, 2024
Chloe Aurard	5th career PWHL assist	March 10, 2024
Alex Carpenter	10th career PWHL assist	March 10, 2024
Jessie Eldridge	5th career PWHL assist	March 16, 2024
Jade Downie-Landry	5th career PWHL goal	March 25, 2024
Elizabeth Giguère	1st career PWHL assist	March 25, 2024
Jill Saulnier	1st career PWHL assist	April 20, 2024
Ella Shelton	5th career PWHL goal	April 24, 2024
Alexandra Labelle	1st career PWHL goal	April 24, 2024
Brooke Hobson	1st career PWHL assist	April 24, 2024
Carley Olivier	1st career PWHL game	April 24, 2024
Abby Roque	5th career PWHL goal	April 28, 2024
Brooke Hobson	1st career PWHL goal	April 28, 2024
Ella Shelton	10th career PWHL assist	April 28, 2024
Jade Downie-Landry	5th career PWHL assist	April 28, 2024
Lindsey Post	1st career PWHL game	April 28, 2024
Savannah Norcross	1st career PWHL assist	April 30, 2024
Jaime Bourbonnais	5th career PWHL goal	May 4, 2024
Alex Carpenter	15th career PWHL assist	May 4, 2024
Lindsey Post	1st career PWHL win	May 4, 2024

== Transactions ==
=== Signings ===
Date	Player	Position	Term	Previous Team	Ref
September 8, 2023	Abby Roque	F	3 years	Team Sonnet	
September 8, 2023	Alex Carpenter	F	3 years	Team Scotiabank	
September 8, 2023	Micah Zandee-Hart	D	3 years	Team Sonnet	
October 31, 2023	Ella Shelton	D	3 years	Team Scotiabank	
November 1, 2023	Jade Downie-Landry	F	1 year	Montreal Force	
November 2, 2023	Brooke Hobson	D	1 year	Modo Hockey Dam	
November 3, 2023	Élizabeth Giguère	F	1 year	Boston Pride	
November 6, 2023	Kayla Vespa	F	1 year	Team Adidas	
November 7, 2023	Jessie Eldridge	F	2 years	Team Harvey's	
November 7, 2023	Emma Woods	F	1 year	Toronto Six	
November 8, 2023	Paetyn Levis	F	1 year	Ohio State	
November 8, 2023	Abbey Levy	G	1 year	Boston College	
November 9, 2023	Alexandra Labelle	F	1 year	Montreal Force	
November 10, 2023	Olivia Zafuto	D	1 year	Boston Pride	
November 14, 2023	Chloé Aurard	F	2 years	Northeastern	
November 20, 2023	Jaime Bourbonnais	D	3 years	Team Scotiabank	
December 6, 2023	Savannah Norcross	F	1 year	Minnesota	
December 19, 2023	Madison Packer	F	1 year	Metropolitan Riveters	
December 20, 2023	Taylor Baker	D	1 year	Montreal Force	
December 20, 2023	Corinne Schroeder	G	1 year	Boston Pride	
December 21, 2023	Lindsey Post	G	1 year	SDE Hockey	
December 22, 2023	Johanna Fällman	D	1 year	Luleå HF	
December 22, 2023	Jill Saulnier	F	2 years	Team Adidas	
