= Kayla Vespa =

Canadian ice hockey player (born 1997)

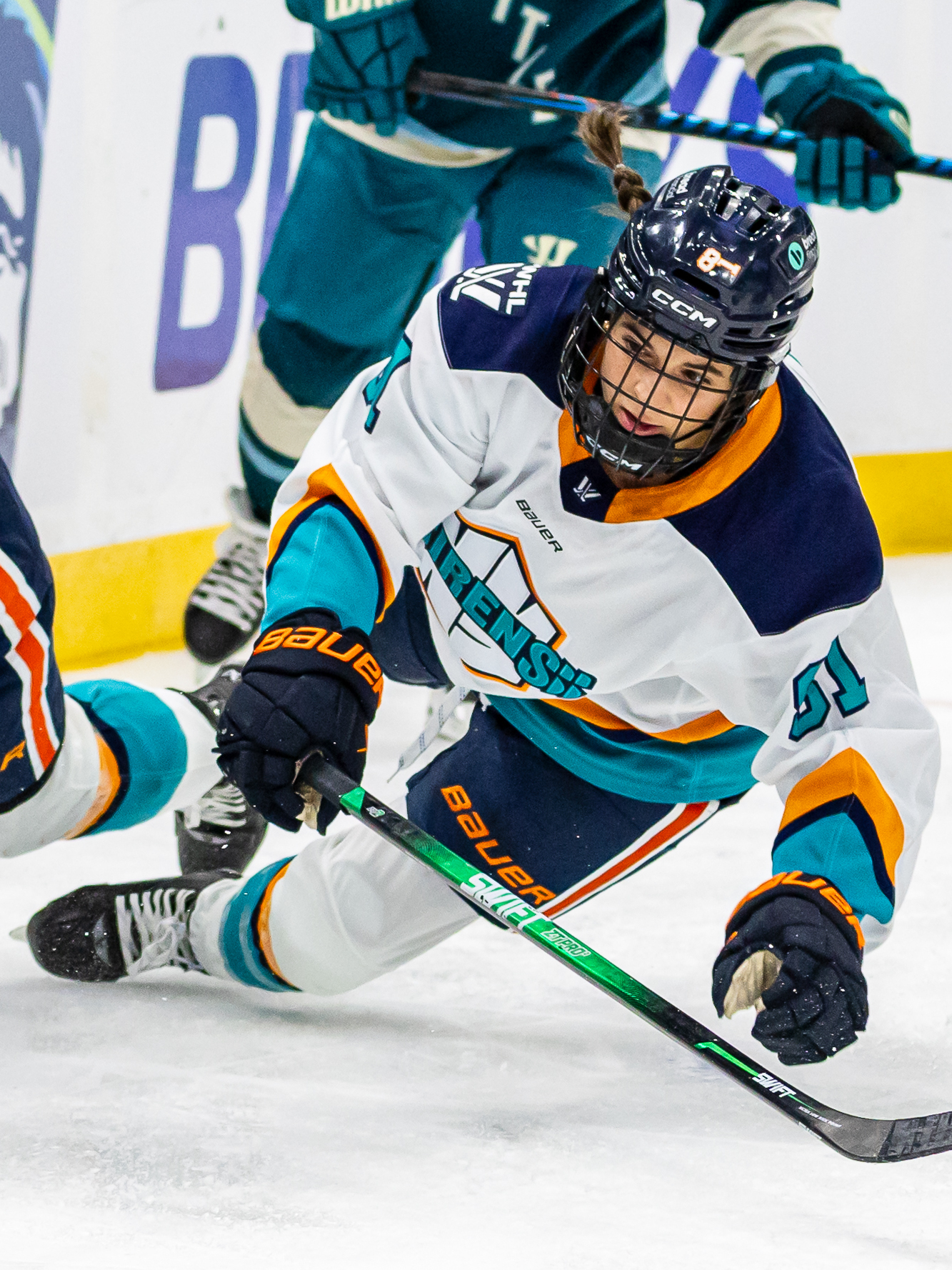
- Vespa with the New York Sirens in 2025
- Born: April 1, 1997 (age 29) Hamilton, Ontario, Canada
- Height: 5 ft 2 in (157 cm)
- Position: Forward
- Shoots: Left
- PWHL team Former teams: Hamilton Havoc; New York Sirens
- Playing career: 2020–present

Kayla Vespa (born April 1, 1997) is a Canadian professional ice hockey player who is a forward for the Hamilton Havoc of the Professional Women's Hockey League (PWHL). She has previously played with the New York Sirens and in the Professional Women's Hockey Players Association (PWHPA) and college ice hockey for St. Lawrence University.

== Playing career ==
=== College ===
After a St. Lawrence University coach scouted 17-year-old Vespa playing for the Stoney Creek Jr. Sabres, she was offered a full scholarship on the spot to play for the Saints. Vespa played for St. Lawrence from 2016 to 2020, making 135 appearances.

=== Professional ===
Vespa began her professional career playing with the Professional Women's Hockey Players Association (PWHPA) in 2020. She played in multiple showcases, commuting to be able to play with a team in Toronto.

When the PWHPA boycott ended and the Professional Women's Hockey League (PWHL) was created, Vespa was drafted by New York 76th overall, in the thirteenth round of the inaugural PWHL draft. She signed a one-year contract with the team and scored in the first PWHL game against Toronto, a 4–0 victory. For the 2024–25 season, the Sirens signed Vespa to a reserve player contract. On June 20, 2025, she signed a one-year standard player contract with the Sirens.

On June 21, 2026, Vespa signed a two-year standard player agreement with the Hamilton Havoc.

== Personal life ==
Vespa began playing hockey at five years old, often playing on boys teams. She played soccer and ran track for St. Jean de Brébeuf high school in Hamilton. She wore number 10, which she continues to wear as a hockey player. She graduated with honors in biochemistry at St. Lawrence University. She worked for the City of Hamilton full-time as a member of the parks and roads department, driving a snowplow on the night shift. Vespa has also been involved with the Stoney Creek Sabres Girls Hockey Association, coaching the U13A girls.

== Career statistics ==
| | | | Regular season | | | | | Playoffs |
| Season | Team | League | GP | G | A | Pts | PIM | GP | G | A | Pts | PIM |
|---|---|---|---|---|---|---|---|---|---|---|---|---|
| 2013–14 | Stoney Creek Jr. Sabres | Prov. WHL | 5 | 1 | 0 | 1 | 2 | — | — | — | — | — |
| 2014–15 | Stoney Creek Jr. Sabres | Prov. WHL | 37 | 20 | 13 | 33 | 4 | 10 | 6 | 2 | 8 | 0 |
| 2015–16 | Stoney Creek Jr. Sabres | Prov. WHL | 39 | 16 | 13 | 29 | 4 | 7 | 0 | 3 | 3 | 0 |
| 2016–17 | St. Lawrence University | ECAC | 36 | 4 | 12 | 16 | 8 | — | — | — | — | — |
| 2017–18 | St. Lawrence University | ECAC | 34 | 3 | 5 | 8 | 10 | — | — | — | — | — |
| 2018–19 | St. Lawrence University | ECAC | 29 | 1 | 19 | 11 | 6 | — | — | — | — | — |
| 2019–20 | St. Lawrence University | ECAC | 36 | 13 | 20 | 33 | 8 | — | — | — | — | — |
| 2020–21 | Team Sonnet | PWHPA | 4 | 0 | 1 | 1 | 0 | — | — | — | — | — |
| 2021–22 | Team Sonnet | PWHPA | 7 | 1 | 3 | 4 | 0 | — | — | — | — | — |
| 2022–23 | Team Adidas | PWHPA | 19 | 5 | 6 | 11 | 8 | — | — | — | — | — |
| 2023–24 | PWHL New York | PWHL | 23 | 2 | 1 | 3 | 4 | — | — | — | — | — |
| 2024–25 | New York Sirens | PWHL | 10 | 0 | 0 | 0 | 0 | — | — | — | — | — |
| 2025–26 | New York Sirens | PWHL | 30 | 0 | 2 | 2 | 6 | — | — | — | — | — |
| PWHL totals | | | 63 | 2 | 3 | 5 | 10 | — | — | — | — | — |
