= Madison Packer =

American ice hockey player (born 1991)

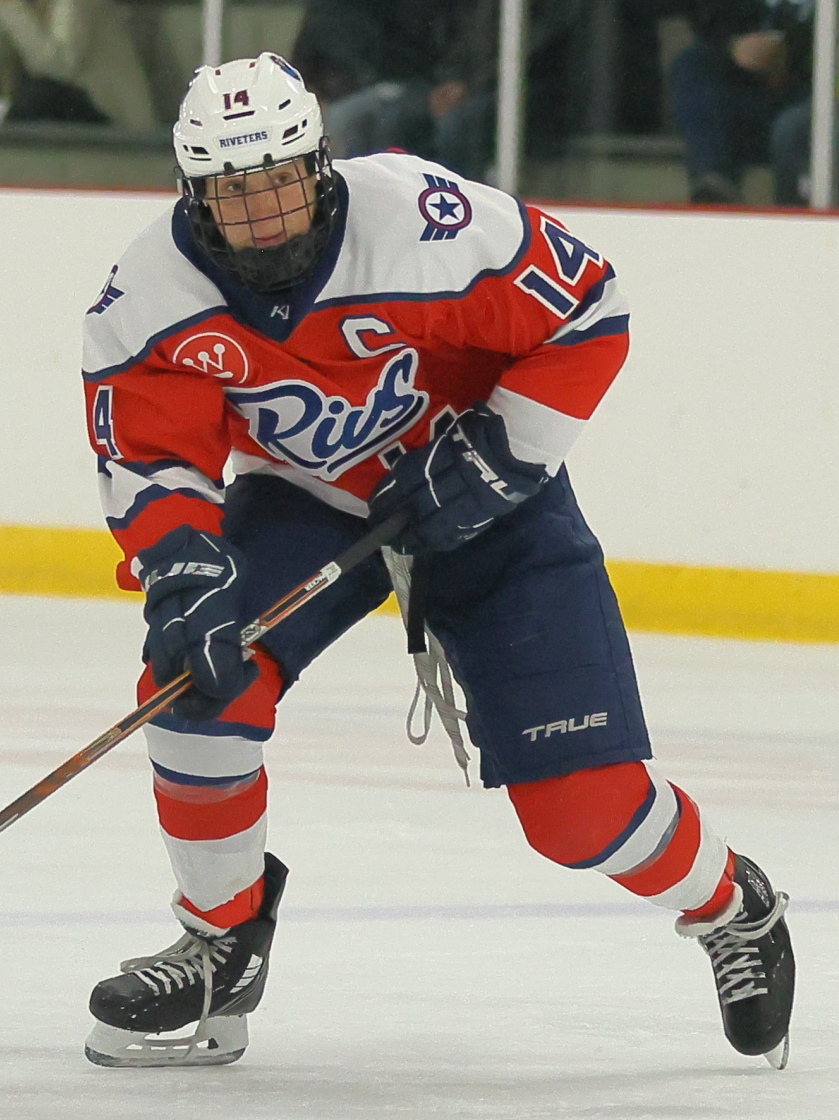
- Packer with the Metropolitan Riveters in 2022
- Born: June 25, 1991 (age 34) Birmingham, Michigan, U.S.
- Height: 5 ft 9 in (175 cm)
- Weight: 150 lb (68 kg; 10 st 10 lb)
- Position: Forward
- Shot: Right
- Played for: Metropolitan Riveters; PWHL New York
- Playing career: 2015–2024

Madison Packer (born June 25, 1991) is an American former professional ice hockey player. A forward, she served as captain of the Metropolitan Riveters of the Premier Hockey Federation (PHF). One of the longest tenured players in PHF history, she is the league's second leading all-time scorer, has played in five All-Star Games, and won the Isobel Cup in 2018 with the Riveters.

== Early life ==
Raised in Birmingham, Michigan, Packer began playing ice hockey at age five and played on a boys team as a youth. She was the second of four children born to Gregory and Laura Packer. Packer is a graduate of private Roman Catholic Marian High School in Bloomfield, Michigan in Metro Detroit. While at high school, she played minor hockey for Little Caesar’s AAA team in Detroit, winning four Michigan State championships. Packer is an inductee of the Marian and Catholic League Hall of Fame. While at high school, the death of friend and team-mate Kelly Scheuer led to Packer joining "Common Ground", a suicide prevention awareness center. Packer led a walk in Scheuer's name, raising money for the center.

== Playing career ==
=== College ===
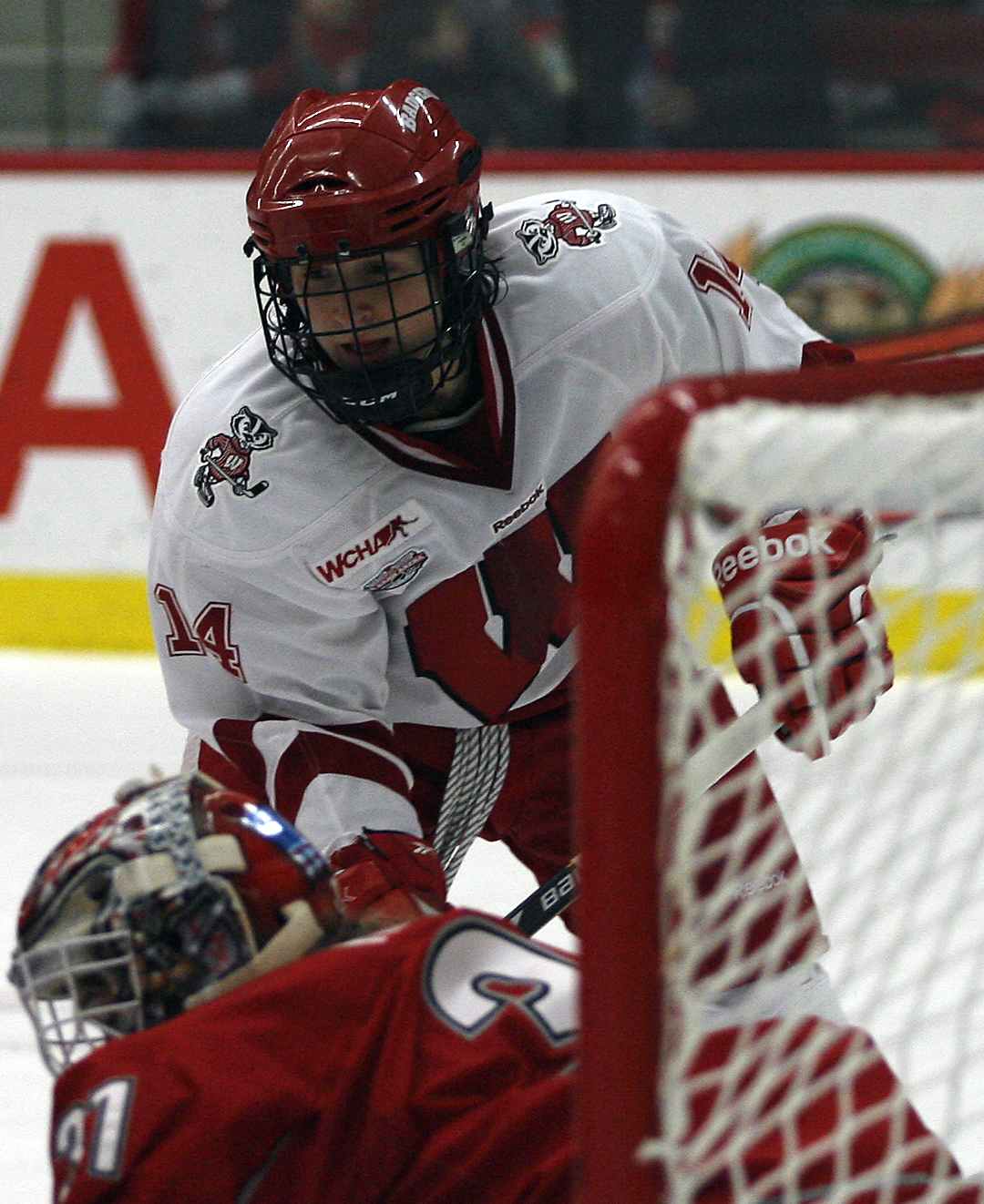
Packer with the University of Wisconsin in 2013

Packer earned a scholarship to the University of Wisconsin and played for their ice hockey program while majoring in journalism. Before playing for the Badgers, Packer had to recover from reconstructive surgery on her right knee, performed in May 2010. She was able to return to ice hockey five months later. In her first season, she helped the club win the 2011 NCAA National Collegiate Women's Ice Hockey Tournament.

During her tenure at Wisconsin, the team would also win one WCHA Championship, and two WCHA league championships. Packer earned rookie honours and player-of-the-week honors during her tenure. During her final season, Packer was an alternate captain for her college team. Packer played 146 games for Wisconsin, scoring 46 goals and 58 assists for a total of 104 points. After her fourth year, Packer retained a connection to hockey, as the radio announcer for Badgers games during the 2014–15 season.

=== NWHL/PHF ===
The second women's professional hockey league, the NWHL was launched in 2015. After college, Packer was interning at a law firm in preparation for law school when she learned about the NWHL. She travelled to New York for tryouts and was signed by the New York Riveters: "I think for a lot of us, we’re just excited to get back on the ice again,” Packer said. “For me, to have this opportunity when I thought my career was over, it’s definitely a humbling experience and it’s something we’re really excited about. You only get to be part of the first time for something once." She described the experience to Agence France-Presse of pioneering the women's game as "the first time that we've really gotten interest, gotten people interested in the game, people wanting to come out and support us, and the first opportunity in the States at least to be professional athletes and get paid for what we're doing, so it's pretty special". In her first season, Packer played 16 games, scoring 3 goals and 4 assists for 7 points, but the team finished last.

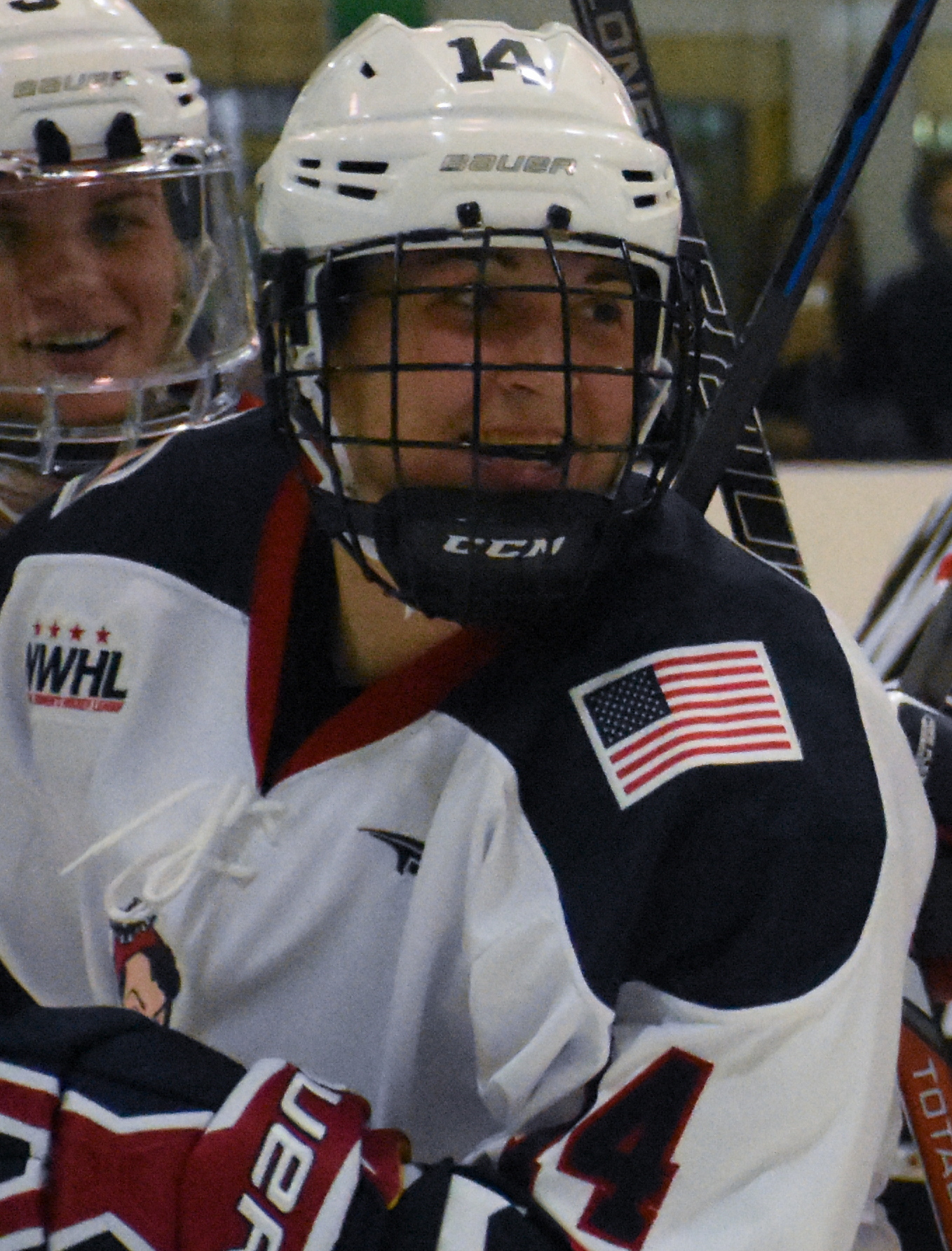
Packer with the New York Riveters in 2015

In early 2016, Packer became one of the first players to re-sign with the New York Riveters for the 2016/17 NWHL season alongside Morgan Fritz-Ward, signing a $15,000 one-year contract. Packer was named alternate captain for the Riveters. In August 2016, Packer was announced as the team's official ambassador to the You Can Play program to eradicate homophobia in sports. Packer had previously held an online campaign against bullying, inspired by the suicide of her friend Scheuer, the same incident during her minor hockey days that inspired her to write. The team cleaned house and Packer was one of the few retained from the previous season: "We went through a lot together. It’s tough to come to the rink and get your ass kicked every night and that’s kind of what we did last. A lot of respect for that group, but we kind knew we needed to clean house and a different dynamic… Speed is definitely going to be our advantage this year. We want to use it." The Riveters would improve to 8–7–1 in 2016–17, for second place in the NWHL.

Packer was selected to play in two league All-Star Games, having played in the 2016 All-Star Game and voted in by fans for the 2017 All-Star Game in February 2017. Playing for Team Steadman, Packer scored twice at the 2nd NWHL All-Star Game. Packer served as an alternate captain for the Riveters for the franchise's first two seasons (2015–2017) before retiring.

During the 2016-17 season, the NWHL announced salary cuts to the players, sparking a statement from Packer and the other NWHL players to the league over health insurance, an audit of league finances, naming the league investors and further determinations about the league's viability. After suffering a torn labrum in the 2016-17 season, she announced her retirement from professional ice hockey on 19 March 2017. However, in September 2017 Packer announced that she would continue with the New York Riveters (now renamed the Metropolitan Riveters) for the 2017–18 season.

She was named to the rosters for the 2019 NWHL All-Star Game in Nashville.

She was named Riveters captain ahead of the 2019–20 season, going into the year as one of eight players from the league's original season still active and tied for the league's all-time points record with Jillian Dempsey. She scored 34 points in 24 games during the season, leading the Riveters in points and good for fifth in total league scoring. She was named captain of one of the teams at the 2020 NWHL All-Star Game, the team being named Team Packer in her honour, and picked up an assist during the game.

At the end of her NWHL/PHF career, which spanned the eight year life of the league, her 129 points in 131 career games were second only to Dempsey.

=== PWHL ===
Packer was named to the roster of New York of the Professional Women's Hockey League (PWHL) after being invited to training camp. The team announced on December 19, 2023, that they had signed her to a one-year contract. She appeared in 23 games for New York. Prior to the start of the following season, on November 23, 2024, Packer announced her retirement from professional hockey on her social media accounts.

== International play ==
Medal record

Representing United States

Women's ice hockey

World U18 Championship
Gold medal – first place	2008 Calgary	
Gold medal – first place	2009 Germany	

Packer attended Team USA National Development Camps in 2006, 2007, 2008 and 2009. Packer was a team member of the U.S. Women's U-18 Team in 2008 and 2009, serving as alternate captain in 2009. She was two-time International Ice Hockey Federation World Women's U18 Championships participant in 2009 in Fussen, Germany and 2008 in Calgary, Alberta, capturing Gold medals both times.

After her junior year of college, Packer was cut from the US Women's team prior to Olympic tryouts. She described the experience in a panel session with the Brooklyn Historical Society:

"It became clear that that Olympic dream wasn't going to happen. I was prepared to graduate, and retire following my senior year, and I did. When I finished my senior year, I trained for an Ironman, walked away from hockey as a player, and began coaching while I finished my final semester of college. The mentality then was that if you weren't in your respective national program, it was basically graduate and play in a pick up league, or move to Canada or Boston if you could make a team in the CWHL and play for free."

== Style of play ==
Packer has been described as a power forward, one of the most physical players in the NWHL, and has been noted for her leadership talents. She has also been noted for being able to contribute both offensively and defensively, often playing prominent roles in the Riveters' penalty-killing units and blocking a high number of shots. She led the NWHL in penalty minutes in the 2018–19 and 2019-20 seasons, and is second all-time in career PIM.

== Personal life ==
On July 22, 2018, she became engaged to fellow NWHL athlete Anya Battaglino. They were married on August 16, 2019 in Newport, Rhode Island. In September 2020, their son was born. She has twelve tattoos.

While playing, Packer has also coached the under-16 team of the New Jersey Rockets minor hockey program. In 2017, she added coaching of the under-19 team and general manager of the entire girls’ program to her duties.

== Career statistics ==
=== Regular season and playoffs ===
			Regular season					Playoffs
Season	Team	League	GP	G	A	Pts	PIM	GP	G	A	Pts	PIM
2010–11	University of Wisconsin	WCHA	38	13	13	26	36	—	—	—	—	—
2011–12	University of Wisconsin	WCHA	36	4	14	18	56	—	—	—	—	—
2012–13	University of Wisconsin	WCHA	35	18	19	37	58	—	—	—	—	—
2013–14	University of Wisconsin	WCHA	37	11	12	23	67	—	—	—	—	—
2015–16	New York Riveters	NWHL	16	3	4	7	22	2	1	0	1	4
2016–17	New York Riveters	NWHL	17	8	5	13	22	1	0	1	1	2
2017–18	Metropolitan Riveters	NWHL	12	10	8	18	12	2	1	2	3	4
2018–19	Metropolitan Riveters	NWHL	15	8	5	13	35	2	0	0	0	2
2019–20	Metropolitan Riveters	NWHL	24	13	21	34	48	1	0	0	0	2
2020–21	Metropolitan Riveters	NWHL	3	0	0	0	4	—	—	—	—	—
2021–22	Metropolitan Riveters	PHF	20	12	11	23	20	1	0	0	0	2
2022–23	Metropolitan Riveters	PHF	24	11	10	21	14	—	—	—	—	—
2023–24	New York	PWHL	23	0	1	1	4	—	—	—	—	—
NWHL/PHF totals			131	65	64	129	177	9	2	3	5	16
PWHL totals			23	0	1	1	4	—	—	—	—	—

=== International ===
Year	Team	Event	Result	GP	G	A	Pts	PIM
2008	United States	U18	1st place, gold medalist(s)	5	5	4	9	6
2009	United States	U18	1st place, gold medalist(s)	5	6	5	11	14
Junior totals				10	11	9	20	20

== Awards and honors ==
- NWHL All-Star Game, 2016, 2017, 2019, 2020
- NWHL Co-Player of the Week, Awarded March 12, 2018
