= Savannah Norcross =

American ice hockey player (born 2000)

- Born: June 10, 2000 (age 26) Lynn, Massachusetts, U.S.
- Height: 5 ft 7 in (170 cm)
- Position: Right Wing
- Shoots: Right
- PWHL team Former teams: New York Sirens; Luleå HF
- Playing career: 2023–present

Savannah Leigh Norcross (born June 10, 2000) is an American professional ice hockey player for the New York Sirens of the Professional Women's Hockey League (PWHL). She previously played for Luleå HF of the Sweden Women's Hockey League (SDHL). She played college ice hockey at University of Minnesota and Boston College.

== Early life ==
Norcross was born in Lynn, Massachusetts. She played youth hockey with the Lynn Youth Hockey Squirt A Team, winning the 2011 EHF "AA" championship.

In 2013, she was selected to join the international program with the East Coast Selects hockey team. The next year she was chosen to attend USA Hockey's national development camp at the Brooks Center.

Norcross played for her high school hockey team, the New Hampton School Lady Huskies. In the 2016–17 season, she helped the team win their first ever NEPSAC D1 Championship Title alongside Cayla Barnes.

She won back-to-back state titles with the U16 and U19 Boston Jr. Eagles in 2017 and 2018.

== Playing career ==
=== Collegiate ===
Norcross attended Boston College from 2018 to 2021. She was reunited with her Jr. Eagles teammate Olivia Finocchiaro and New Hampton teammate Barnes with the Boston College Eagles. She made her 2019–2020 college debut on September 28, 2018 against the Minnesota Duluth Bulldogs and scored her first goal in the next game against the Bulldogs on September 29. She finished the season with three goals and two penalties.

In her sophomore season, she saw offensive improvements, finishing the 2020–2021 fourth on the team in goals (11) and led the team in penalty minutes (46). She received two game misconducts for illegal hits. Her first multi-point game was on October 18, 2019 Merrimack Warriors, a goal and an assist.

As a junior, she played in all 20 games and recorded career-high in points (21), goals (12), and assists (9), and had a 21.8% shot percentage. She also led the team in goals and points.

For the 2021–22 season, she transferred to the University of Minnesota. She citing that she "wanted to be with a group of girls that wants to keep playing after college" and credits Taylor Heise as one of the reasons for her transfer. Her debut with the Gophers was on October 1 at the home game against Ohio State. She finished the season with five multi-point games and sixth on the team in points (26), with 9 goals and 17 assists.

In her fifth-year season, she made the WCHA All-Academic Team and her NCAA Frozen Four debut.

=== Professional ===
==== PWHL ====
While Norcross was not selected in the 2023 PWHL Draft, she was invited to training camp with the PWHL New York in September 2023. On December 6, 2023, she signed a one-year contract with New York and made the final roster. During the 2023–24 season, she recorded one assist in 20 games.

==== SDHL ====
Norcross was invited to the Sirens training camp for the 2024–25 season. She did not make the final roster and eventually signed with Luleå HF of the SDHL. She played in 13 regular season games with Luleå, totaling 18 points (5 goals, 13 assists). Luleå made it to the Swedish Championship gold medal game. In the third period of the second game of the series, Norcross thought she scored the tying goal but it was ruled goalie interference. Luleå was swept in the series, ending their six consecutive championships.

==== Return to PWHL ====
On June 21, 2025, she signed a one-year contract returning to the Siren for the 2025–26 season. She scored her first PWHL goal against the Vancouver Goldeneyes on December 31, 2025. The Sirens placed her on LTIR on April 15, 2026, after sustaining a lower-body injury and would miss the remainder of the season.

== Personal life ==
Norcross is the daughter of Bill and Gayle Norcross. She has a younger brother, Billy, who played hockey for Northeastern University. She grew up looking up to Marie-Philip Poulin, and players from Boston University.

Norcross captained her varsity high school field hockey team and softball team. She won the 2017 Fall Shackett-Berry Award, awarded to a female student-athlete who demonstrates conscientious comment to improve the field hockey team.

== Career statistics ==
			Regular season					Playoffs
Season	Team	League	GP	G	A	Pts	PIM	GP	G	A	Pts	PIM
2018–19	Boston College	HE	37	3	0	3	4	—	—	—	—	—
2019–20	Boston College	HE	36	11	6	17	46	—	—	—	—	—
2020–21	Boston College	HE	20	12	9	21	4	—	—	—	—	—
2021–22	University of Minnesota	WCHA	39	10	18	28	10	—	—	—	—	—
2022–23	University of Minnesota	WCHA	35	2	6	8	2	—	—	—	—	—
2023–24	PWHL New York	PWHL	20	0	1	1	2	4	1	0	1	2
2024–25	Luleå HF	SDHL	13	5	13	18	10	9	3	5	8	6
2025–26	PWHL New York	PWHL	20	1	1	2	4	—	—	—	—	—
SDHL totals			13	5	13	18	10	9	3	5	8	6
PWHL totals			43	1	2	3	6	—	—	—	—	—
