= Lindsey Post =

Canadian ice hockey goaltender

- Born: January 11, 1994 (age 32) Chelsea, Québec, Canada
- Height: 183 cm (6 ft 0 in)
- Position: Goaltender
- PWHL team Former teams: Free agent Calgary Inferno; SDE Hockey; PWHL New York
- Playing career: 2017–present

Lindsey Post is a Canadian professional ice hockey goaltender, currently a free agent.

== Playing career ==
Across five years for the University of Alberta, Post set programme records for most wins and shutouts. In her final year, she would lead the team to the 2017 U Sports national championship, earning MVP honours.

Post was drafted 25th overall in the 2017 CWHL Draft by the Inferno. She would earn her first CWHL win against the Markham Thunder on the 4th of November 2017 and her first CWHL shutout the week after against the Toronto Furies, for which she was named CWHL Goaltender of the Week. She would be named Goaltender of the week two more times in her rookie season. The team would win the Clarkson Cup in her second year, even if she only played one game. While playing in Calgary, she lived with her relatives in the city to save money due to the low CWHL salaries.

After the collapse of the CWHL in May 2019, Post signed with SDE in Sweden. She would finish her first SDHL season with a save percentage of .942, the best in the league, as the team made the playoffs for the first time in history. She was named the 2019-20 SDHL Goaltender of the Year. She began the 2020-21 SDHL season in a similar way, posting a 53-save shutout in the first match of the season and a 42-save performance in the next game.

She signed with PWHL New York on December 21, 2023.

== Career statistics ==
			Regular season									Playoffs
Season	Team	League	GP	W	L	T/OT	MIN	GA	SO	GAA	SV%	GP	W	L	MIN	GA	SO	GAA	SV%
2012–13	University of Alberta	CW	8	—	—	—	—	—	—	1.33	.931	1	—	—	—	—	—	0.00	1.000
2013–14	University of Alberta	CW	15	—	—	—	—	—	—	0.91	.946	—	—	—	—	—	—	—	—
2014–15	University of Alberta	CW	27	—	—	—	—	—	—	1.18	.940	4	—	—	—	—	—	1.49	.924
2015–16	University of Alberta	CW	23	—	—	—	—	—	—	1.34	.931	—	—	—	—	—	—	—	—
2016–17	University of Alberta	CW	19	—	—	—	—	—	—	1.31	.929	—	—	—	—	—	—	—	—
2017–18	Calgary Inferno	CWHL	13	7	4	1	733	27	2	2.21	.913	—	—	—	—	—	—	—	—
2018–19	Calgary Inferno	CWHL	1	0	1	0	57	3	0	3.14	.885	—	—	—	—	—	—	—	—
2019–20	SDE Hockey	SDHL	19	10	9	0	1,102	37	3	2.01	.942	2	0	2	96	10	0	6.24	.846
2020–21	SDE Hockey	SDHL	32	11	20	0	1,892	84	4	2.66	.912	2	0	2	120	11	0	5.50	.841
2021–22	SDE Hockey 2	Div. 1	1	0	1	0	59	3	0	3.03	.897	—	—	—	—	—	—	—	—
2021–22	SDE Hockey	SDHL	24	10	14	0	1,384	53	4	2.30	.915	3	1	2	251	10	0	2.39	.935
2022–23	SDE Hockey	SDHL	21	11	10	0	1,204	37	6	1.84	.938	2	0	2	120	9	0	4.50	.824
2023–24	New York	PWHL	2	1	0	0	74	2	0	1.61	.946	—	—	—	—	—	—	—	—
PWHL totals			2	1	0	0	74	2	0	1.61	.946	—	—	—	—	—	—	—	—
