= Grace Wolfe =

- Born: May 5, 2003 (age 23) Owatonna, Minnesota
- Height: 5 ft 9 in (175 cm)
- Position: Defense
- Shoots: Right
- PWHL team: New York Sirens
- Playing career: 2026–present

Grace Wolfe (born May 5, 2003) is a professional ice hockey defenseman drafted by the New York Sirens of the Professional Women's Hockey League. She played her college ice hockey with St. Cloud State.

== Playing career ==
=== College ===
During the 2025-26 season, Wolfe logged a career high 21 points. She graduated from St. Cloud State tied for the all-time record in games played with 154. During her five seasons with the program, she blocked 268 shots.

=== Professional ===
On June 17, 2026, Kelly was selected fifty-fifth overall in the 2026 PWHL Draft. She was the fifth player in St. Cloud State program history to be selected in the PWHL Draft.
