= 2024 PWHL season =

- League: Professional Women's Hockey League
- Sport: Ice hockey
- Duration: January 1 – May 5, 2024
- Games: 24 per team
- Teams: 6
- Total attendance: 392,259
- TV partner(s): CBC, TSN, Sportsnet

Draft
- Top draft pick: (United States) Taylor Heise
- Picked by: PWHL Minnesota

Regular season
- Season champions: PWHL Toronto
- Season MVP: Natalie Spooner (PWHL Toronto)
- Top scorer: Natalie Spooner (PWHL Toronto) (27)

Playoffs
- Playoffs MVP: Taylor Heise (Minnesota)

Walter Cup
- Champions: PWHL Minnesota
- Runners-up: PWHL Boston

PWHL seasons
- 2024–25 →

The 2024 PWHL season was the first season of operation of the Professional Women's Hockey League, and began play on January 1, 2024. It started off with six teams that competed without any unique names or branding: PWHL Boston, PWHL Minnesota, PWHL Montreal, PWHL New York, PWHL Ottawa, and PWHL Toronto. The regular season began on January 1, 2024. PWHL Toronto topped the regular season standings with 17 wins and 47 points. A two-round, best-of-five playoff including the top four teams was then held from May 8 to May 29. PWHL Minnesota won the inaugural Walter Cup, defeating PWHL Boston in a 5-game series for the title.

== League business ==
The PWHL was announced in August 2023 after the Mark Walter Group announced the formation of a new league aligned with the players in the Professional Women's Hockey Players Association, and subsequently purchased and folded the rival Premier Hockey Federation in June 2023. On August 29, the locations of the six charter franchises were announced.

On September 1, 2023, a 10-day free agency period began, during which each team was eligible to sign up to three players. On the same day, the league announced the general managers for each team: Danielle Marmer for Boston, Natalie Darwitz for Minnesota, Pascal Daoust for New York, Gina Kingsbury for Toronto, Daniele Sauvageau for Montreal, and Michael Hirshfeld for Ottawa. On September 5, Emily Clark, Brianne Jenner, and Emerance Maschmeyer became the first players signed to PWHL contracts when they signed with Ottawa.

On September 18, 2023, the inaugural PWHL Draft took place. It was a 15-round draft, with the initial order determined by a lottery, and subsequent rounds following a "snake format" in which the team who selected last in the previous round selected first in the next round, and the selection order was reversed. The draft order was announced on September 1, with the lottery won by Minnesota, followed by Toronto, Boston, New York, Ottawa, and Montreal. The league allowed players to apply for "compassionate circumstances" in order to stay in their home markets, with those approved eligible to be drafted only by their home market teams; the list of approved players will not be publicly released. Taylor Heise was picked first overall by Minnesota.

On October 25, 2023, PWHL Holdings, LLC filed potential names for the six teams with the United States Patent and Trademark Office. According to The Athletic, the potential names were Boston Wicked, Minnesota Superior, Montreal Echo, New York Sound, Ottawa Alert, and Toronto Torch. PWHL Holdings had previously filed trademarks for the league name and logos. However, the league eventually opted against naming the teams ahead of the season due to time constraints; for the 2024 season only, the teams were known by their city names, and team jerseys featured a diagonal wordmark of their home city.

Training camps opened on November 15, with final rosters confirmed on December 11. Final rosters include 23 roster players and 3 reserve players.

From December 3 to 7, all six teams congregated for a pre-season evaluation camp in Utica, New York, which included scrimmages at the Utica University Nexus Center. PWHL executive Jayna Hefford stated that the unified camp enabled the league to experiment and provided an opportunity for team and player education around issues like safety and doping.

On January 15, it was announced that 24 PWHL players would participate in the 2024 NHL All-Star weekend in Toronto, playing a 3-on-3 showcase game on February 1.

The PWHL season paused for the 2024 IIHF Women's World Championship, which ran from April 3–14, and featured 39 PWHL players.

On May 22, 2024, the PWHL was announced as the winner of the Sports Business Journal's 2024 Breakthrough of the Year award.

On May 24, 2024, the league announced that the 2024 PWHL Awards ceremony would be held June 10–11 at the InterContinental Saint Paul Riverfront Hotel in downtown Saint Paul, Minnesota.

=== Coaching changes ===
On December 27, 2023, one week before PWHL Minnesota's inaugural game, the team announced that head coach Charlie Burggraf had decided to step away from the team, citing family reasons. Burggraf had been named the team's first coach on September 15, 2023, and coached the team to a perfect 3–0 record in the preseason. Ken Klee was then named Burggraf's replacement.

== Regular season ==
=== Standings ===
Pos	Team	Pld	W	OTW	OTL	L	GF	GA	GD	Pts	Qualification
1	Toronto (Y)	24	13	4	0	7	69	50	+19	47	Playoffs
2	Montreal (X)	24	10	3	5	6	60	57	+3	41	Playoffs
3	Boston (X)	24	8	4	3	9	50	57	−7	35 (Note: Greater number of games won, excluding games won by Shootout: Boston 11 wins, Minnesota 10 wins)	Playoffs
4	Minnesota (X)	24	8	4	3	9	54	54	0	35	Playoffs
5	Ottawa (E)	24	8	1	6	9	62	63	−1	32	
6	New York (E)	24	5	4	3	12	53	67	−14	26	

Updated to match(es) played on May 5, 2024. Source: PWHL
(E) Eliminated; (X) Clinched playoff berth; (Y) Clinched first place

=== Schedule ===
The regular season schedule was announced on November 30, 2023. The season began on January 1 and ended on May 5, 2024, with each team playing 24 games. The schedule paused in February for an IIHF National Team Break, and in April for the 2024 Women's Ice Hockey World Championships. The playoffs began the week of May 6.

All times in Eastern Time.

Game log
Pre-season camp

Date	Time	Visitor	Score	Home	OT	Notes	Box score/recap
December 4	1:00	Toronto	5–2	Boston		@ Utica University Nexus Center	
December 4	4:15	Ottawa	4–8	Minnesota		@ Utica University Nexus Center	
December 4	7:30	Montreal	0–4	New York		@ Utica University Nexus Center	
December 5	12:00	Minnesota	5–4	Toronto		@ Utica University Nexus Center	
December 5	3:15	Boston	1–3	Montreal		@ Utica University Nexus Center	
December 5	7:30	Ottawa	1–2	New York	SO	@ Utica University Nexus Center	
December 7	9:00 am	Montreal	3–4	Minnesota		@ Utica University Nexus Center	
December 7	12:15	New York	6–4	Toronto		@ Utica University Nexus Center	
December 7	3:30	Ottawa	1–3	Boston		@ Utica University Nexus Center	

Regular season

January

Date	Time	Visitor	Score	Home	OT	Notes	Box score/recap
January 1	12:30	New York	4–0	Toronto		Corinne Schroeder recorded shutout (1)	
January 2	7:00	Montreal	3–2	Ottawa	OT	New attendance record: 8,318	
January 3	7:00	Minnesota	3–2	Boston			
January 5	7:00	Toronto	3–2	New York			
January 6	3:30	Montreal	0–3	Minnesota		Maddie Rooney recorded shutout (1); Grace Zumwinkle recorded hat-trick (1); New attendance record: 13,316	
January 8	6:00	Ottawa	–	Boston		Game postponed to February 19 due to inclement weather	
January 10	7:00	Montreal	5–2	New York		Played @ UBS Arena; Marie-Philip Poulin recorded hat-trick (1)	
January 10	8:00	Toronto	1–3	Minnesota			
January 13	1:00	Ottawa	5–1	Toronto			
January 13	3:30	Boston	3–2	Montreal	OT		
January 14	4:00	New York	3–2	Minnesota	OT		
January 16	7:00	New York	2–3	Montreal		Played @ Place Bell	
January 17	7:00	Minnesota	3–2	Ottawa	OT		
January 17	7:00	Boston	3–2	Toronto			
January 20	12:30	New York	4–1	Boston		Jade Downie-Landry recorded hat-trick (1)	
January 20	8:00	Toronto	4–3	Montreal	SO	First regular season shootout.	
January 23	7:00	Toronto	1–3	Ottawa			
January 24	7:00	Boston	3–2	Ottawa			
January 24	8:00	Montreal	2–1	Minnesota			
January 26	7:00	New York	0–2	Toronto		Kristen Campbell recorded shutout (1)	
January 27	3:30	Ottawa	1–2	Montreal	OT	Played @ Place Bell	
January 27	4:00	Minnesota	3–4	Boston	OT		
January 28	1:00	Minnesota	2–1	New York	OT		

February

Date	Time	Visitor	Score	Home	OT	Notes	Box score/recap
February 3	12:00	Minnesota	1–4	Toronto			
February 4	1:00	New York	4–3	Ottawa	OT		
February 4	3:30	Montreal	2–1	Boston	OT		
February 14	7:00	Toronto	5–3	Boston		Natalie Spooner recorded hat-trick (1)	
February 14	8:00	Ottawa	1–2	Minnesota			
February 16	7:00	Montreal	0–3	Toronto		Played at Scotiabank Arena; New attendance record: 19,285; Kristin Campbell recorded shutout (2)	
February 17	2:00	Minnesota	2–1	Ottawa			
February 17	4:00	New York	2–1	Boston	OT		
February 18	1:00	Minnesota	1–2	Montreal		Played @ Place Bell	
February 19	4:30	Ottawa	4–2	Boston		Rescheduled from January 8	
February 21	7:00	Ottawa	1–3	Boston			
February 21	7:00	Montreal	2–3	New York	SO	Played @ UBS Arena	
February 23	7:00	New York	1–2	Toronto	SO		
February 24	2:30	Ottawa	3–6	Montreal		Claire Dalton recorded hat-trick (1)	
February 25	4:00	Boston	2–0	Minnesota		Aerin Frankel recorded shutout (1)	
February 27	8:00	Toronto	4–3	Minnesota	OT	Played @ 3M Arena at Mariucci	
February 28	7:00	New York	2–4	Ottawa			

March

Date	Time	Visitor	Score	Home	OT	Notes	Box score/recap
March 2	3:30	Toronto	5–2	Ottawa			
March 2	4:00	Boston	1–3	Montreal			
March 3	12:30	Minnesota	2–0	New York		Played @ UBS Arena; Maddie Rooney recorded shutout (2)	
March 5	8:00	Ottawa	3–4	Minnesota	SO		
March 6	7:00	Montreal	4–3	New York			
March 6	7:00	Boston	1–3	Toronto			
March 8	7:00	Montreal	0–3	Toronto		Kristen Campbell recorded shutout (3)	
March 10	3:00	New York	2–3	Boston	OT		
March 10	4:00	Ottawa	4–2	Montreal		Played @ Place Bell	
March 13	8:00	Boston	0–4	Minnesota		Nicole Hensley recorded shutout (1)	
March 16	3:30	New York	1–5	Minnesota			
March 16	6:00	Ottawa	1–2	Boston	SO	Played @ Little Caesars Arena, Detroit	
March 17	12:30	Toronto	2–1	Montreal		Played @ PPG Paints Arena, Pittsburgh	
March 20	7:00	Ottawa	3–0	New York		Emerance Maschmeyer recorded shutout (1)	
March 20	7:00	Boston	1–2	Toronto			
March 23	1:00	Toronto	3–5	Ottawa		Daryl Watts recorded hat-trick (1)	
March 24	4:00	Montreal	2–3	Minnesota	SO		
March 25	7:00	Boston	2–3	New York		Played @ UBS Arena	

April

Date	Time	Visitor	Score	Home	OT	Notes	Box score/recap
April 18	7:00	Toronto	1–2	Boston			
April 18	7:00	Minnesota	3–4	Montreal			
April 20	1:00	Toronto	3–2	Montreal	OT	New attendance record: 21,105; Played @ Bell Centre	
April 20	3:30	Boston	2–1	New York		Played @ Prudential Center	
April 20	7:00	Minnesota	0–4	Ottawa		Emerance Maschmeyer recorded shutout (2); Brianne Jenner recorded hat-trick (1)	
April 24	7:00	Boston	2–3	Ottawa	SO		
April 24	7:00	New York	2–5	Montreal			
April 27	12:30	Montreal	2–0	Ottawa		Ann-Renée Desbiens recorded shutout (1)	
April 27	2:00	Boston	2–1	Minnesota			
April 28	1:00	Toronto	6–2	New York		Sarah Nurse recorded hat-trick (1); Played @ UBS Arena	
April 30	7:00	Ottawa	3–4	New York		New York clinched first pick in the 2024 PWHL draft Played @ Prudential Center	

May

Date	Time	Visitor	Score	Home	OT	Notes	Box score/recap
May 1	7:00	Minnesota	1–4	Toronto		Toronto clinched first place	
May 4	1:00	Minnesota	2–5	New York		Played @ UBS Arena	
May 4	3:30	Montreal	3–4	Boston		Boston clinched playoff spot	
May 5	7:00	Ottawa	2–5	Toronto		Ottawa eliminated from playoffs Minnesota clinched playoff spot	

=== Statistics ===
==== Scoring leaders ====
The following players led the league in regular season points at the conclusion of the season.

Note: GP = Games played; G = Goals; A = Assists; Pts = Points; PIM = Penalty minutes;

Player	Team	GP	G	A	Pts	+/–	PIM
Natalie Spooner	Toronto	24	20	7	27	+11	4
Sarah Nurse	Toronto	24	11	12	23	+6	14
Marie-Philip Poulin	Montreal	21	10	13	23	+8	14
Alex Carpenter	New York	24	8	15	23	−8	0
Ella Shelton	New York	24	7	14	21	−6	12
Brianne Jenner	Ottawa	24	9	11	20	+1	4
Grace Zumwinkle	Minnesota	24	11	8	19	+6	4
Emma Maltais	Toronto	24	4	15	19	+6	16
Laura Stacey	Montreal	23	10	8	18	+4	2
Kateřina Mrázová	Ottawa	23	6	12	18	−2	16
Erin Ambrose	Montreal	24	4	14	18	+5	4

==== Leading goaltenders ====
The following goaltenders led the league in regular season goals against average at the conclusion of the season.

Minimum 240 minutes

Note: GP = Games played; Min, TOI = Minutes played; W = Wins; L = Losses; OTL = Overtime losses; GA = Goals-against; GAA = Goals-against average; SO = Shutouts; SV% = Save percentage;

Player	Team	GP	TOI	W	L	OTL	GA	SO	SV%	GAA
Elaine Chuli	Montreal	8	483:41	6	1	0	13	0	.949	1.61
Kristen Campbell	Toronto	22	1293:59	16	6	0	43	3	.927	1.99
Aerin Frankel	Boston	18	1050:52	8	6	2	35	1	.929	2.00
Maddie Rooney	Minnesota	10	605:34	5	3	2	21	2	.915	2.08
Nicole Hensley	Minnesota	14	849:22	7	6	1	31	1	.919	2.19

=== Attendance ===
Home team	Home games	Average attendance	Total attendance
Ottawa	12	7,496	89,952
Minnesota	12	7,138	85,660
Montreal	11	6,881	75,686
Toronto	12	3,912	46,948
Boston	11	3,770	41,474
New York	12	2,496	29,952
Neutral sites	2	11,293	22,586
League	70	5,448	392,259

On February 16, 2024, Toronto hosted its first game at Scotiabank Arena against Montreal dubbed by the league as "The Battle on Bay Street." The game set a league and women's hockey attendance record with a sellout crowd of 19,285, beating the previous record of 18,013 at the 2013 IIHF Women's World Championship. On April 20, 2024, Montreal hosted Toronto at the Bell Centre dubbed as the "Duel at the Top", breaking the previously set record with an attendance of 21,105.

=== Supplemental discipline ===
==== Suspensions ====
^{†} - suspension covered at least one 2024 postseason game

Date of incident	Offender	Team	Offense	Length
January 24, 2024	Taylor Wenczkowski	Boston	Roughing Amanda Boulier.	1 game
March 8, 2024	Brittany Howard	Toronto	Cross-check to the back of the head of Catherine Daoust.	1 game
March 20, 2024	Jocelyne Larocque	Toronto	Cross-check to the back of the head of Alina Müller.	1 game
May 4, 2024	Sarah Lefort	Montreal	Open-ice check against Jamie Lee Rattray.	1 game^{†}
Total:				4 games

==== Fines ====
Date of incident	Offender	Team	Offense	Amount
March 8, 2024	Brittany Howard	Toronto	Grabbing the facemask of Sarah Lefort.	$250.00
March 8, 2024	Rebecca Leslie	Toronto	Grabbing the facemask of Sarah Bujold.	$250.00
March 20, 2024	Tereza Vanišová	Ottawa	Hitting Abby Roque from behind.	$250.00
April 20, 2024	Amanda Pelkey	Boston	Unsportsmanlike conduct at the end of the April 18 game against Toronto.	$500.00
May 4, 2024	Liz Schepers	Minnesota	Hit on Jaime Bourbonnais.	$500.00
May 4, 2024	Mélodie Daoust	Montreal	Grabbing the facemask of Emily Brown.	$250.00
Total:				$2,000.00

== PWHL Playoffs ==
By virtue of finishing first overall, Toronto was able to choose its first-round opponent between fourth-place Minnesota and third-place Boston. On May 6, Toronto announced their choice to play Minnesota, leaving Montreal to play Boston in the other semi-final.

Semi-finals
May 8–17, Coca-Cola Coliseum and Xcel Energy Center
PWHL Toronto	4	2	0	0**	1
PWHL Minnesota	0	0	2	1**	4
May 9–18, Place Bell and Tsongas Center
PWHL Montreal	1*	1***	2*	—	—
PWHL Boston	2*	2***	3*	—	—

PWHL Finals
May 19–29, Tsongas Center and Xcel Energy Center
PWHL Minnesota	3	3	4	0**	3
PWHL Boston	4	0	1	1**	0

* – Denotes overtime period(s)

=== Semi-finals ===
==== Toronto (1) vs. Minnesota (4) ====
Toronto finished first overall in the league, earning 47 points. Minnesota finished in 4th place with 35 points. Toronto won three of four regular season meetings against Minnesota, including both meetings in Toronto and with one win coming in overtime.

Minnesota defeated Toronto in five games, winning three straight after losing the first two. In game one, Blayre Turnbull scored twice, Natalie Spooner recorded a goal and an assist, and Kristen Campbell made 26 saves to earn her first career playoff shutout—the first playoff shutout in league history—as Toronto defeated Minnesota 4–0. Game two remained scoreless until Jesse Compher scored with 1:25 left in regulation to give Toronto a 1–0 lead; Hannah Miller added an empty-net goal with 10 seconds remaining to put the game out of reach, with Campbell turning aside 21 Minnesota shots to give Toronto a 2–0 victory. In game three, with Minnesota facing elimination, Maddie Rooney made 18 saves for Minnesota in a 2–0 victory, with Maggie Flaherty scoring Minnesota's first goal of the series at 2:12 of the second period. Toronto also lost league leading-scorer Spooner to an injury, and she would not return for the rest of the series. In game four, neither team scored in regulation; Claire Butorac scored 4:27 into the second overtime period for Minnesota as Rooney made 19 saves in the win, sending the series to a fifth and deciding game. In game five, Taylor Heise scored twice, including the game winner in the third period, while Rooney stopped 27 shots to secure a 4–1 victory and a spot in the Walter Cup Finals.

May 8	PWHL Minnesota	0–4	PWHL Toronto	Coca-Cola Coliseum	Recap
No scoring		First period	09:47 – Natalie Spooner (1)
No scoring		Second period	00:55 – Emma Maltais (1); 15:05 – Blayre Turnbull (1)
No scoring		Third period	19:22 – Blayre Turnbull (2)
Nicole Hensley 16 saves / 20 shots		Goalie stats	Kristen Campbell 26 saves / 26 shots

May 10	PWHL Minnesota	0–2	PWHL Toronto	Coca-Cola Coliseum	Recap
No scoring		First period	No scoring
No scoring		Second period	No scoring
No scoring		Third period	18:35 – Jesse Compher (1); 19:50 – en – Hannah Miller (1)
Maddie Rooney 28 saves / 29 shots		Goalie stats	Kristen Campbell 21 saves / 21 shots

May 13	PWHL Toronto	0–2	PWHL Minnesota	Xcel Energy Center	Recap
No scoring		First period	No scoring
No scoring		Second period	2:12 – Maggie Flaherty (1); 8:39 – Denisa Křížová (1)
No scoring		Third period	No scoring
Kristen Campbell 24 saves / 26 shots		Goalie stats	Maddie Rooney 18 saves / 18 shots

May 15	PWHL Toronto	0–1	2OT	PWHL Minnesota	Xcel Energy Center	Recap
No scoring		First period		No scoring
No scoring		Second period		No scoring
No scoring		Third period		No scoring
No scoring		Second overtime period		4:27 – Claire Butorac (1)
Kristen Campbell 28 saves / 29 shots		Goalie stats		Maddie Rooney 19 saves / 19 shots

May 17	PWHL Minnesota	4–1	PWHL Toronto	Coca-Cola Coliseum	Recap
No scoring		First period	No scoring
Denisa Křížová (2) – pp – 7:29		Second period	8:07 – Rebecca Leslie (1)
Taylor Heise (1) – pp – 8:30; Sophia Kunin (1) – en – 18:48; Taylor Heise (2) – en – 19:45		Third period	No scoring
Maddie Rooney 27 saves / 28 shots		Goalie stats	Kristen Campbell 27 saves / 29 shots

Minnesota won series 3–2

==== Montreal (2) vs. Boston (3) ====
Boston finished 3rd place in the league earning 35 points. Montreal finished in 2nd place earning 41 points. Montreal and Boston split their regular season series with two wins each, including one regulation and one overtime win each.

Boston defeated Montreal in a three-game sweep, with all three games decided in overtime. In game one, Aerin Frankel made 53 saves, and Susanna Tapani scored the game-winning goal in overtime—the first overtime goal in PWHL playoff history—and Boston won the game 2–1. Game two was decided at 8:16 of the third overtime period, with Taylor Wenczkowski netting her first career PWHL goal, securing a 2–1 victory for Boston; Frankel made 56 saves in the contest, breaking her previous save record from Game 1. In game three, with Montreal leading 2–0 after two periods, Boston scored twice in the third to send the game into overtime for the third consecutive time. Boston won the game 3–2, with Tapani scoring the game-winning goal, her second of the series, just 62 seconds into overtime, clinching the series for Boston.

May 9	PWHL Boston	2–1	OT	PWHL Montreal	Place Bell	Recap
No scoring		First period		No scoring
No scoring		Second period		01:07 – pp – Kristin O'Neill (1)
Lexie Adzija (1) – 01:48		Third period		No scoring
Susanna Tapani (1) – 14:25		First overtime period		No scoring
Aerin Frankel 53 saves / 54 shots		Goalie stats		Ann-Renée Desbiens 24 saves / 26 shots

May 11	PWHL Boston	2–1	3OT	PWHL Montreal	Place Bell	Recap
Amanda Pelkey (1) – 06:48		First period		No scoring
No scoring		Second period		01:58 – pp – Kristin O'Neill (2)
No scoring		Third period		No scoring
Taylor Wenczkowski (1) – 11:44		Third overtime period		No scoring
Aerin Frankel 56 saves / 57 shots		Goalie stats		Ann-Renée Desbiens 50 saves / 52 shots

May 14	PWHL Montreal	2–3	OT	PWHL Boston	Tsongas Center	Recap
Marie-Philip Poulin (1) – 15:39		First period		No scoring
Maureen Murphy (1) – pp – 13:35		Second period		No scoring
No scoring		Third period		7:06 – Sophie Shirley (1); 16:17 – sh – Amanda Pelkey (2)
No scoring		First overtime period		1:02 – Susanna Tapani (2)
Ann-Renée Desbiens 21 saves / 24 shots		Goalie stats		Aerin Frankel 32 saves / 34 shots

Boston won series 3–0

=== PWHL Finals ===
==== Boston (3) vs. Minnesota (4) ====
Boston won three out of five meetings against Minnesota during the regular season, including one overtime win and two wins on the road at Xcel Energy Center.

Minnesota defeated Boston in five games to capture the inaugural Walter Cup championship. Although Michela Cava opened the scoring for Minnesota in game one, Aerin Frankel stopped 30 out of 33 shots as Boston secured a 4–3 victory. Minnesota responded in game two with a 3–0 victory that saw Nicole Hensley post a shutout and Sophie Jaques score two goals. Minnesota secured another 3-goal win in game three, with Taylor Heise scoring her league-leading fifth playoff goal to open the scoring en route to a 4–1 win. Game four was scoreless into a second overtime period. Minnesota appeared to capture the victory and the series when Jaques shot the puck past Frankel with 2:34 remaining; however, the goal was reviewed and disallowed due to goaltender interference, and 70 seconds after play resumed, Alina Müller scored for Boston to send the series to a fifth and deciding game. In game five, Hensley secured her second shutout of the series and Liz Schepers' second period goal stood as the winner as Minnesota secured a 3–0 victory and the Walter Cup title. Heise, who led the playoffs in scoring, was voted the most valuable player of the playoffs.

May 19	PWHL Minnesota	3–4	PWHL Boston	Tsongas Center	Recap
Michela Cava (1) – 4:38		First period	7:08 – Susanna Tapani (3)
Taylor Heise (3) – 8:04; Taylor Heise (4) – 17:10		Second period	12:50 – Taylor Wenczkowski (2); 15:11 – Hannah Brandt (1); 17:25 – Jess Healey (1)
No scoring		Third period	No scoring
Maddie Rooney 18 saves / 22 shots		Goalie stats	Aerin Frankel 30 saves / 33 shots

May 21	PWHL Minnesota	3–0	PWHL Boston	Tsongas Center	Recap
Michela Cava (2) – 14:25; Sophie Jaques (1) – 16:21		First period	No scoring
No scoring		Second period	No scoring
Sophie Jaques (2) – en – 17:31		Third period	No scoring
Nicole Hensley 20 saves / 20 shots		Goalie stats	Aerin Frankel 20 saves / 22 shots

May 24	PWHL Boston	1–4	PWHL Minnesota	Xcel Energy Center	Recap
No scoring		First period	0:59 – Taylor Heise (5); 17:38 – Sydney Brodt (1)
Alina Müller (1) – 19:58		Second period	No scoring
No scoring		Third period	3:29 – Michela Cava (3); 16:10 – sh – en – Grace Zumwinkle (1)
Aerin Frankel 21 saves / 24 shots		Goalie stats	Nicole Hensley 18 saves / 19 shots

May 26	PWHL Boston	1–0	2OT	PWHL Minnesota	Xcel Energy Center	Recap
No scoring		First period		No scoring
No scoring		Second period		No scoring
No scoring		Third period		No scoring
Alina Müller (2) – 18:36		Second overtime period		No scoring
Aerin Frankel 33 saves / 33 shots		Goalie stats		Nicole Hensley 32 saves / 33 shots

May 29	PWHL Minnesota	3–0	PWHL Boston	Tsongas Center	Recap
No scoring		First period	No scoring
Liz Schepers (1) – 6:14		Second period	No scoring
Michela Cava (4) – 8:08; Kendall Coyne Schofield (1) – en – 17:54		Third period	No scoring
Nicole Hensley 17 saves / 17 shots		Goalie stats	Aerin Frankel 41 saves / 43 shots

Minnesota won series 3–2

=== Statistics ===
==== Scoring leaders ====
The following players led the league in playoff points at the conclusion of the Walter Cup.

Note: GP = Games played; G = Goals; A = Assists; Pts = Points; PIM = Penalty minutes;

Player	Team	GP	G	A	Pts	+/–	PIM
Taylor Heise	Minnesota	10	5	3	8	+6	2
Michela Cava	Minnesota	10	4	4	8	+6	4
Sophie Jaques	Minnesota	10	2	3	5	+6	2
Liz Schepers	Minnesota	10	1	4	5	+2	2
Mellissa Channell	Minnesota	10	0	5	5	+6	2
Susanna Tapani	Boston	8	3	1	4	+0	2
Kendall Coyne Schofield	Minnesota	10	1	3	4	+6	0
Megan Keller	Boston	8	0	4	4	+2	10
Alina Müller	Boston	8	2	1	3	+1	0
Amanda Pelkey	Boston	8	2	1	3	+0	0

==== Leading goaltenders ====
The following goaltenders led the league in playoffs goals against average at the conclusion of the Walter Cup.

Note: GP = Games played; Min, TOI = Minutes played; W = Wins; L = Losses; OTL = Overtime losses; GA = Goals-against; GAA = Goals-against average; SO = Shutouts; SV% = Save percentage;

Player	Team	GP	TOI	W	L	GA	SO	SV%	GAA
Kristen Campbell	Toronto	5	321:03	2	3	5	2	.962	0.93
Nicole Hensley	Minnesota	5	338:29	3	1	6	2	.945	1.06
Maddie Rooney	Minnesota	5	322:12	3	2	6	2	.948	1.12
Aerin Frankel	Boston	8	580:80	5	3	14	1	.953	1.45
Ann-Renée Desbiens	Montreal	3	247:11	0	3	7	0	.931	1.70

=== Attendance ===
Playoff attendance
Home team	Home games	Average attendance	Total attendance
Montreal	2	9,654	19,307
Toronto	3	8,518	25,555
Minnesota	4	7,067	28,268
Boston	4	4,535	18,141
League	13	7,021	91,271

== All-Star Showcase ==
On January 15, 2024, the PWHL along with the National Hockey League (NHL) announced the Canadian Tire PWHL 3-on-3 Showcase, which was hosted by the NHL on February 1, 2024, at Scotiabank Arena in Toronto as part of the NHL's All-Star Game.

24 players from all six PWHL teams competed in one 20-minute game. PWHL Special Advisor Cassie Campbell-Pascall and New Jersey Devils Director of Player Development, Meghan Duggan served as coaches. The two teams were named in honor of former tennis players and current PWHL advisory board members Billie Jean King and Ilana Kloss. Each team was also accompanied by celebrity coaches with former figure skater Tessa Virtue joining Team King and basketball player Jonquel Jones joining Team Kloss.

New York's Micah Zandee-Hart was also selected to play but was unable to participate due to injury.

Team King
Head coaches: (Canada) Cassie Campbell-Pascall, (Canada) Tessa Virtue
Nat.	Player	Team	Pos.	#
(United States)	Kendall Coyne Schofield (C)	Minnesota	F	26
(United States)	Hilary Knight	Boston	F	21
(Switzerland)	Alina Müller	Boston	F	11
(United States)	Kelly Pannek	Minnesota	F	12
(Canada)	Marie-Philip Poulin	Montreal	F	29
(Canada)	Blayre Turnbull	Toronto	F	40
(United States)	Savannah Harmon	Ottawa	D	15
(United States)	Megan Keller	Boston	D	5
(Canada)	Ella Shelton	New York	D	17
(United States)	Lee Stecklein	Minnesota	D	2
(Canada)	Ann-Renée Desbiens	Montreal	G	35
(United States)	Aerin Frankel	Boston	G	31

Team Kloss
Head coaches: (United States) Meghan Duggan, (The Bahamas) Jonquel Jones
Nat.	Player	Team	Pos.	#
(United States)	Alex Carpenter	New York	F	25
(Canada)	Emily Clark	Ottawa	F	26
(United States)	Taylor Heise	Minnesota	F	27
(Canada)	Brianne Jenner (C)	Ottawa	F	19
(Canada)	Sarah Nurse	Toronto	F	20
(United States)	Abby Roque	New York	F	11
(Canada)	Laura Stacey	Montreal	F	7
(Canada)	Erin Ambrose	Montreal	D	23
(Canada)	Renata Fast	Toronto	D	14
(Canada)	Jocelyne Larocque	Toronto	D	3
(United States)	Nicole Hensley	Minnesota	G	29
(Canada)	Emerance Maschmeyer	Ottawa	G	38

=== Game summary ===
February 1, 2024	Team King	5–3	Team Kloss	Scotiabank Arena	Recap
00:59 – Ella Shelton (1); 09:39 – Savannah Harmon (1)		First period	Alex Carpenter (1) – 02:07; Jocelyne Larocque (1) – 04:26
03:05 – Savannah Harmon (2); 03:40 – Savannah Harmon (3); 06:45 – Kendall Coyne Schofield (1)		Second period	Brianne Jenner (1) – 08:54
No period		Third period	No period
Ann-Renée Desbiens 8 saves / 10 shots Aerin Frankel 5 saves / 6 shots		Goalie stats	Emerance Maschmeyer 6 saves / 9 shots Nicole Hensley 6 saves / 8 shots

== Awards and honors ==
=== PWHL Awards ===
On April 4, 2024, the PWHL announced that the league's championship trophy would be named the Walter Cup. Further, on April 25, 2024, the league announced the remainder of the awards that would be handed out this year, including the Billie Jean King MVP Award and the Ilana Kloss Playoff MVP Award.

Award	Recipient(s)	Runner(s)-up/finalists	Ref
Walter Cup	PWHL Minnesota	PWHL Boston	
Billie Jean King MVP Award; Most valuable player, regular season	Natalie Spooner (Toronto)	Alex Carpenter (New York); Marie-Philip Poulin (Montreal)	
Ilana Kloss Playoff MVP Award; Most valuable player, playoffs	Taylor Heise (Minnesota)	—N/a	
Forward of the Year	Natalie Spooner (Toronto)	Alex Carpenter (New York); Marie-Philip Poulin (Montreal)	
Defender of the Year	Erin Ambrose (Montreal)	Megan Keller (Boston); Ella Shelton (New York)	
Goaltender of the Year	Kristen Campbell (Toronto)	Aerin Frankel (Boston); Corinne Schroeder (New York)	
Rookie of the Year	Grace Zumwinkle (Minnesota)	Emma Maltais (Toronto); Alina Müller (Boston)	
Coach of the Year	Troy Ryan (Toronto)	Kori Cheverie (Montreal); Courtney Kessel (Boston)	
Points Leader; Regular season	Natalie Spooner (Toronto) – 27	Alex Carpenter (New York) – 23; Sarah Nurse (Toronto) – 23; Marie-Philip Poulin (Montreal) – 23	
Top Goal Scorer; Regular season	Natalie Spooner (Toronto) – 20	Sarah Nurse (Toronto) – 11; Grace Zumwinkle (Minnesota) – 11	
Hockey for All Award; Leadership and positive change in the community	Maureen Murphy (Montreal)	N/A	
3 Stars of the Week Leader	Natalie Spooner (Toronto) – 100	Kristen Campbell (Toronto) – 70; Brianne Jenner (Ottawa) – 70	

=== All-Star teams ===
Position	First Team	Second Team	All-Rookie
F	Alex Carpenter (New York)	Brianne Jenner (Ottawa)	Emma Maltais (Toronto)
F	Marie-Philip Poulin (Montreal)	Sarah Nurse (Toronto)	Alina Müller (Boston)
F	Natalie Spooner (Toronto)	Grace Zumwinkle (Minnesota)	Grace Zumwinkle (Minnesota)
D	Erin Ambrose (Montreal)	Renata Fast (Toronto)	Ashton Bell (Ottawa)
D	Ella Shelton (New York)	Megan Keller (Boston)	Sophie Jaques (Minnesota)
G	Kristen Campbell (Toronto)	Aerin Frankel (Boston)	Emma Söderberg (Boston)

== Transactions ==
=== Draft ===
The 2023 PWHL Draft was held on September 18, 2023. Draft picks are not allowed to be traded until the conclusion of the 2024 season. Players not drafted became free agents able to sign with any team. Players were drafted from a pool of 268 players who declared their eligibility. Overall, 90 players were selected over 15 rounds. Minnesota made Taylor Heise the first player ever drafted into the PWHL.

=== Free agency ===
Date	Player	New team	Previous team	League	Ref
September 5, 2023	Emily Clark	Ottawa	Team Harvey's	PWHPA	
September 5, 2023	Brianne Jenner	Ottawa	Team Sonnet	PWHPA	
September 5, 2023	Emerance Maschmeyer	Ottawa	Team Scotiabank	PWHPA	
September 6, 2023	Renata Fast	Toronto	Team Adidas	PWHPA	
September 6, 2023	Sarah Nurse	Toronto	Team Adidas	PWHPA	
September 6, 2023	Blayre Turnbull	Toronto	Team Scotiabank	PWHPA	
September 6, 2023	Kendall Coyne Schofield	Minnesota	Team Adidas	PWHPA	
September 6, 2023	Kelly Pannek	Minnesota	Team Scotiabank	PWHPA	
September 6, 2023	Lee Stecklein	Minnesota	Team Harvey's	PWHPA	
September 7, 2023	Aerin Frankel	Boston	Team Adidas	PWHPA	
September 7, 2023	Megan Keller	Boston	Team Scotiabank	PWHPA	
September 7, 2023	Hilary Knight	Boston	Team Sonnet	PWHPA	
September 7, 2023	Ann-Renee Desbiens	Montreal	Team Harvey's	PWHPA	
September 7, 2023	Marie-Philip Poulin	Montreal	Team Harvey's	PWHPA	
September 7, 2023	Laura Stacey	Montreal	Team Adidas	PWHPA	
September 8, 2023	Alex Carpenter	New York	Team Scotiabank	PWHPA	
September 8, 2023	Abby Roque	New York	Team Sonnet	PWHPA	
September 8, 2023	Micah Zandee-Hart	New York	Team Sonnet	PWHPA	
November 6, 2023	Becca Gilmore	Ottawa	Boston Pride	PHF	
November 7, 2023	Kaleigh Fratkin	Boston	Boston Pride	PHF	
November 10, 2023	Erica Howe	Toronto	Team Sonnet	PWHPA	
November 10, 2023	Nicole Kosta	Boston	Team Scotiabank	PWHPA	
November 15, 2023	Sarah Bujold	Montreal	Metropolitan Riveters	PHF	
November 21, 2023	Mariah Keopple	Montreal	Princeton Tigers	NCAA	
November 29, 2023	Brooke Bryant	Minnesota	Minnesota State Mavericks	NCAA	
November 30, 2023	Claire Butorac	Minnesota	Minnesota State Mavericks	NCAA	
December 1, 2023	Brittyn Fleming	Minnesota	Minnesota Whitecaps	PHF	
December 5, 2023	Savannah Norcross	New York	Minnesota Golden Gophers	NCAA	
December 11, 2023	Cami Kronish	Boston	AIK Hockey	SDHL	
December 12, 2023	Marlène Boissonnault	Montreal	Team Harvey's	PWHPA	
December 12, 2023	Catherine Daoust	Montreal	Montreal Force	PHF	
December 12, 2023	Sarah Lefort	Montreal	Montreal Force	PHF	
December 12, 2023	Leah Lum	Montreal	Montreal Force	PHF	
December 12, 2023	Samantha Cogan	Toronto	Team Sonnet	PWHPA	
December 12, 2023	Carly Jackson	Toronto	Toronto Six	PHF	
December 12, 2023	Jess Jones	Toronto	Team Adidas	PWHPA	
December 12, 2023	Lauriane Rougeau	Toronto	Team Harvey's	PWHPA	
December 12, 2023	Kaitlin Willoughby	Toronto	Team Adidas	PWHPA	
December 19, 2023	Madison Packer	New York	Metropolitan Riveters	PHF	
December 19, 2023	Taylor Wenczkowski	Boston	Boston Pride	PHF	
December 19, 2023	Maddie Rooney	Minnesota	Team Adidas	PWHPA	
December 19, 2023	Sidney Morin	Boston	Minnesota Whitecaps	PHF	
December 20, 2023	Gigi Marvin	Boston	Team Adidas	PWHPA	
December 20, 2023	Dominique Kremer	Minnesota	Buffalo Beauts	PHF	
December 20, 2023	Tori Howran	Ottawa	Connecticut Whale	PHF	
December 20, 2023	Taylor Baker	New York	Montreal Force	PHF	
December 20, 2023	Amanda Pelkey	Boston	Metropolitan Riveters	PHF	
December 20, 2023	Abby Cook	Minnesota	HC Ladies Lugano	SWHL A	
December 20, 2023	Mikyla Grant-Mentis	Ottawa	Buffalo Beauts	PHF	
December 21, 2023	Lindsey Post	New York	SDE Hockey	SDHL	
December 21, 2023	Emma Greco	Minnesota	Toronto Six	PHF	
December 21, 2023	Natalie Snodgrass	Ottawa	Minnesota Whitecaps	PHF	
December 21, 2023	Rachel McQuigge	Ottawa	Metropolitan Riveters	PHF	
December 21, 2023	Mellissa Channell	Minnesota	Team Harvey's	PWHPA	
December 22, 2023	Fanni Garát-Gasparics	Ottawa	Brynas IF	SDHL	
December 22, 2023	Johanna Fällman	New York	Lulea HF	SDHL	
December 22, 2023	Akane Shiga	Ottawa	Japan	IIHF	
December 27, 2023	Brigitte Laganière	Montreal	Montreal Force	PHF	
January 14, 2024	Alexa Gruschow	New York	Team Harvey's	PWHPA	
January 31, 2024	Emma Buckles	Ottawa	Team Sonnet	PWHPA	
February 14, 2024	Lauren Bench	Minnesota	MoDo Hockey	SDHL	
February 18, 2024	Catherine Dubois	Montreal	Montreal Force	PHF	
March 2, 2024	Alex Poznikoff	Montreal	Team Harvey's	PWHPA	
March 5, 2024	Sammy Davis	Ottawa	Boston Pride	PHF	
March 10, 2024	Samantha Isbell	Ottawa	Montreal Force	PHF	
March 17, 2024	Mikyla Grant-Mentis	Montreal	Ottawa	PWHL	
April 1, 2024	Malia Schneider	Ottawa	Brynas IF	SDHL	
April 30, 2024	Kelly Babstock	Boston	HC Ladies Lugano	SWHL A	
May 15, 2024	Jess Jones	Toronto	Toronto	PWHL	

=== Trades ===
February 11, 2024	To Boston Abby Cook; Susanna Tapani	To Minnesota Sophie Jaques
March 18, 2024	To Montreal Amanda Boulier	To Ottawa Tereza Vanisova
March 18, 2024	Boston Lexie Adzija; Caitrin Lonergan	Ottawa Shiann Darkangelo

=== Contract terminations ===
Date	Player	Team	Ref
January 31, 2024	Tori Howran	Ottawa	
February 1, 2024	Jess Jones	Toronto	
February 14, 2024	Nicole Kosta	Boston	
February 18, 2024	Mikyla Grant-Mentis	Ottawa	

=== Retirement ===
Date	Player	Team	Ref
May 17, 2024	Brittany Howard	Toronto	
June 3, 2024	Jess Healey	Montreal	
June 4, 2024	Mélodie Daoust	Montreal	
June 7, 2024	Brittyn Fleming	Minnesota	

== Broadcasting rights ==
Internationally, PWHL games were streamed via the league's official YouTube channel. In Canada, the league was also available nationally on TSN, Sportsnet, and CBC (in French on RDS, Radio-Canada and Ici TOU.TV). In the United States, the league was available regionally on Bally Sports North, NESN, SportsNet Pittsburgh and MSG Network.
