= Pascal Daoust =

Canadian ice hockey executive

- Daoust in 2026
- Occupation: Ice hockey executive
- Years active: 2016–present
- Employer(s): Val-d'Or Foreurs (2016–2023); New York Sirens (2023–present)
- Organization: New York Sirens
- Title: General manager

Pascal Daoust is a Canadian ice hockey executive, the first and current general manager of the New York Sirens of the Professional Women's Hockey League (PWHL).

== Career ==
Daoust received a bachelor's degree in physical education from the Université de Montréal in 1999. He was an assistant coach for their women's hockey program from 2010 to 2016, winning two national championships in that time. He also served as assistant coach of Les Canadiennes de Montreal in the Canadian Women's Hockey League.

Following his time with the Carabins, Daoust was general manager of the Val-d'Or Foreurs of the Quebec Major Junior Hockey League, also serving as interim head coach on multiple occasions. He oversaw a run to the President's Cup finals in 2021, but was fired in February 2023 after multiple disappointing seasons.

Turning down an offer to work on the development staff of a National Hockey League team, Daoust was hired as the first general manager of New York in the newly-created Professional Women's Hockey League (PWHL). The inaugural PWHL season saw New York finish in last of the six teams and with only five regulation wins, but earning the first overall pick in the 2024 PWHL Draft.
