= Ella Shelton =

Canadian ice hockey player (born 1998)

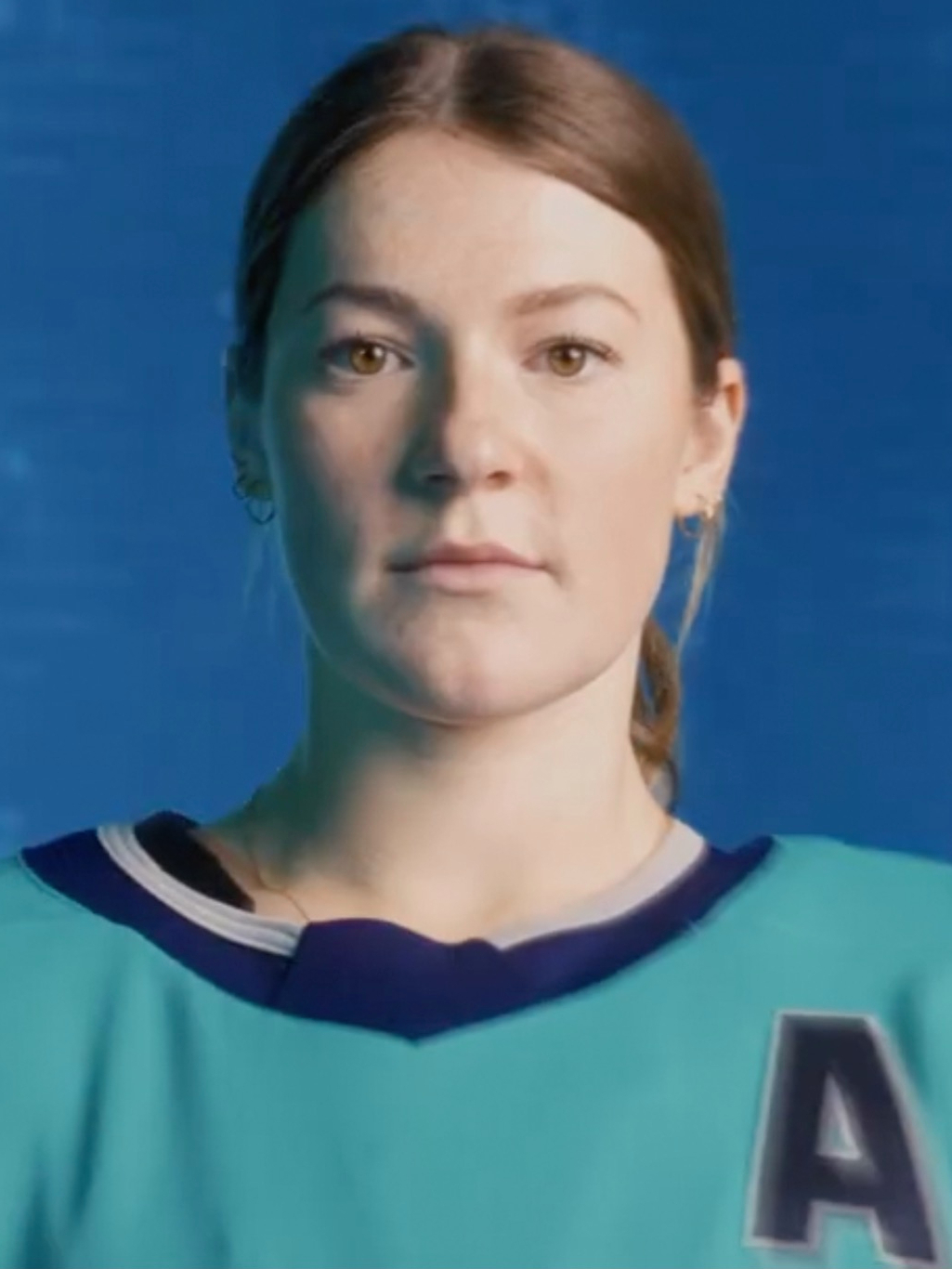
- Shelton with PWHL New York in 2024
- Born: January 19, 1998 (age 28) Ingersoll, Ontario, Canada
- Height: 5 ft 8 in (173 cm)
- Weight: 176 lb (80 kg; 12 st 8 lb)
- Position: Defence
- Shoots: Left
- PWHL team Former teams: Toronto Sceptres; New York Sirens
- National team: Canada
- Playing career: 2013–present
Medal record
Olympic Games
Gold medal – first place	2022 Beijing	Team
Silver medal – second place	2026 Milano Cortina	Team
World Championship
Gold medal – first place	2021 Canada
Gold medal – first place	2022 Denmark
Gold medal – first place	2024 United States
Silver medal – second place	2023 Canada
Silver medal – second place	2025 Czechia
Silver medal – second place	2026 Denmark

Ella Shelton (born January 19, 1998) is a Canadian professional ice hockey player who is a defender for the Toronto Sceptres of the Professional Women's Hockey League (PWHL), and member of the Canadian national team. She was drafted fourth overall in the 2023 PWHL draft by the New York Sirens.

== Playing career ==
=== Junior ===
Shelton played junior hockey in the Provincial Women's Hockey League for the London Jr. Devilettes. She was a member of the first Devilettes team that had their own arena. In 2016, Shelton skated for Team Ontario's under-18 provincial squad.

=== College ===
In her freshman season playing college ice hockey for Clarkson University, the 2016–17 season, Shelton recorded six goals and twenty-five points, including assists in both the semifinals and finals of the national tournament, which the Golden Knights won.

As a senior in the 2019–20 season, Shelton was named captain of the Golden Knights, and was named a Second Team All-American and a finalist for the ECAC's Best Defenseman award. Her thirty-three points on the strength of nine goals and twenty-four assists ranked fifth nationally among defencemen.

=== Professional ===
Upon graduating from college, Shelton joined the Professional Women's Hockey Players Association (PWHPA), where she played two seasons. She was affiliated with the Toronto hub during the 2020–21 season and played with Team Scotiabank during the 2022–23 season.

On September 18, 2023, Shelton was selected in the first round, fourth overall by PWHL New York in the 2023 Draft of the Professional Women's Hockey League (PWHL). On October 31, 2023, she signed a three-year contract with the team. On December 21, 2023, Shelton and teammate Alex Carpenter were named the first alternate captains in team history.

On January 1, 2024, against PWHL Toronto, Shelton scored the first goal in PWHL history. She would finish the season with seven goals, with her 21 points good for fifth overall and first among defenders. She and New York placed last in the regular season.

On June 24, 2025, Shelton was traded to the Toronto Sceptres in exchange for a first-round (3rd overall) and fourth-round (27th overall) draft pick in the 2025 PWHL Draft. On November 19, 2025, she signed a one-year contract extension with the Sceptres.

== International play ==
Shelton was named to the Canadian contingent that participated at the Nations Cup in Fussen, Germany in January 2018, which saw her call fellow Clarkson Golden Knight Loren Gabel a teammate. Losing both games in the preliminary round to send them to the fifth-place match, the Canadians defeated Germany by a 5–1 mark. Shelton would assist on a second period goal by Brooke Stacey, her only point of the tournament.

Shelton recorded her first international goal at the senior level at the 2021 World Championship, in a 5–1 win over the Russian Olympic Committee. The Canadians would go on to earn the gold medal with a 3–2 overtime finals victory against the United States.

She was one of 28 players invited to Hockey Canada's Centralization Camp, which represents the selection process for the Canadian women's team that shall compete in Ice hockey at the 2022 Winter Olympics. On January 11, 2022, Shelton was named to Canada's 2022 Olympic team.

Shelton was a member of Team Canada at the 2024 World Championship, where the Canadians won their 100th World Championship game, a 4–1 victory over Finland in which Shelton recorded a goal and two assists. The Canadians would go on to win the gold medal.

On January 9, 2026, she was named to Canada's roster to compete at the 2026 Winter Olympics.

== Personal life ==
Shelton majored in biology at Clarkson University. In high school, she played soccer and basketball in addition to hockey. Shelton became engaged to fellow hockey player Josh Dunne in July 2026.

== Career statistics ==
=== Regular season and playoffs ===
			Regular season					Playoffs
Season	Team	League	GP	G	A	Pts	PIM	GP	G	A	Pts	PIM
2013–14	London Jr. Devilettes	Prov. WHL	37	4	2	6	26	3	0	0	0	2
2014–15	London Jr. Devilettes	Prov. WHL	37	7	14	21	40	3	0	0	0	14
2015–16	London Jr. Devilettes	Prov. WHL	34	11	16	27	18	7	1	3	4	6
2016–17	Clarkson University	ECAC	41	6	19	25	10	—	—	—	—	—
2017–18	Clarkson University	ECAC	39	5	20	25	10	—	—	—	—	—
2018–19	Clarkson University	ECAC	40	6	19	25	24	—	—	—	—	—
2019–20	Clarkson University	ECAC	33	9	24	33	18	—	—	—	—	—
2020–21	Team Sonnet	PWHPA	4	2	3	5	2	—	—	—	—	—
2022–23	Team Scotiabank	PWHPA	18	5	4	9	8	—	—	—	—	—
2023–24	PWHL New York	PWHL	24	7	14	21	12	—	—	—	—	—
2024–25	New York Sirens	PWHL	24	8	8	16	12	—	—	—	—	—
2025–26	Toronto Sceptres	PWHL	30	3	4	7	12	—	—	—	—	—
PWHL totals			78	18	26	44	36	—	—	—	—	—

=== International ===
Year	Team	Event	Result	GP	G	A	Pts	PIM
2021	Canada	WC	1st place, gold medalist(s)	7	1	2	3	4
2022	Canada	OG	1st place, gold medalist(s)	7	0	3	3	2
2022	Canada	WC	1st place, gold medalist(s)	7	2	7	9	0
2023	Canada	WC	2nd place, silver medalist(s)	7	0	1	1	0
2024	Canada	WC	1st place, gold medalist(s)	7	1	2	3	2
2025	Canada	WC	2nd place, silver medalist(s)	7	2	2	4	2
2026	Canada	OG	2nd place, silver medalist(s)	7	0	3	3	2
Senior totals				49	6	20	26	12

== Awards and honours ==
Honors	Year	Ref
ECAC
All-Academic Team	2017, 2018, 2019, 2020	
Third Team All-Star	2017	
All-Rookie Team	2017	
All-Tournament Team	2017, 2018, 2019	
Second Team All-Star	2018, 2019	
First Team All-Star	2020	
NCAA
USCHO All-Rookie Team	2017	
Second Team ACHA All-American	2020	
Second Team All-USCHO	2020	
PWHL
First Team All-Star	2024	
