= Abby Roque =

American ice hockey player (born 1997)

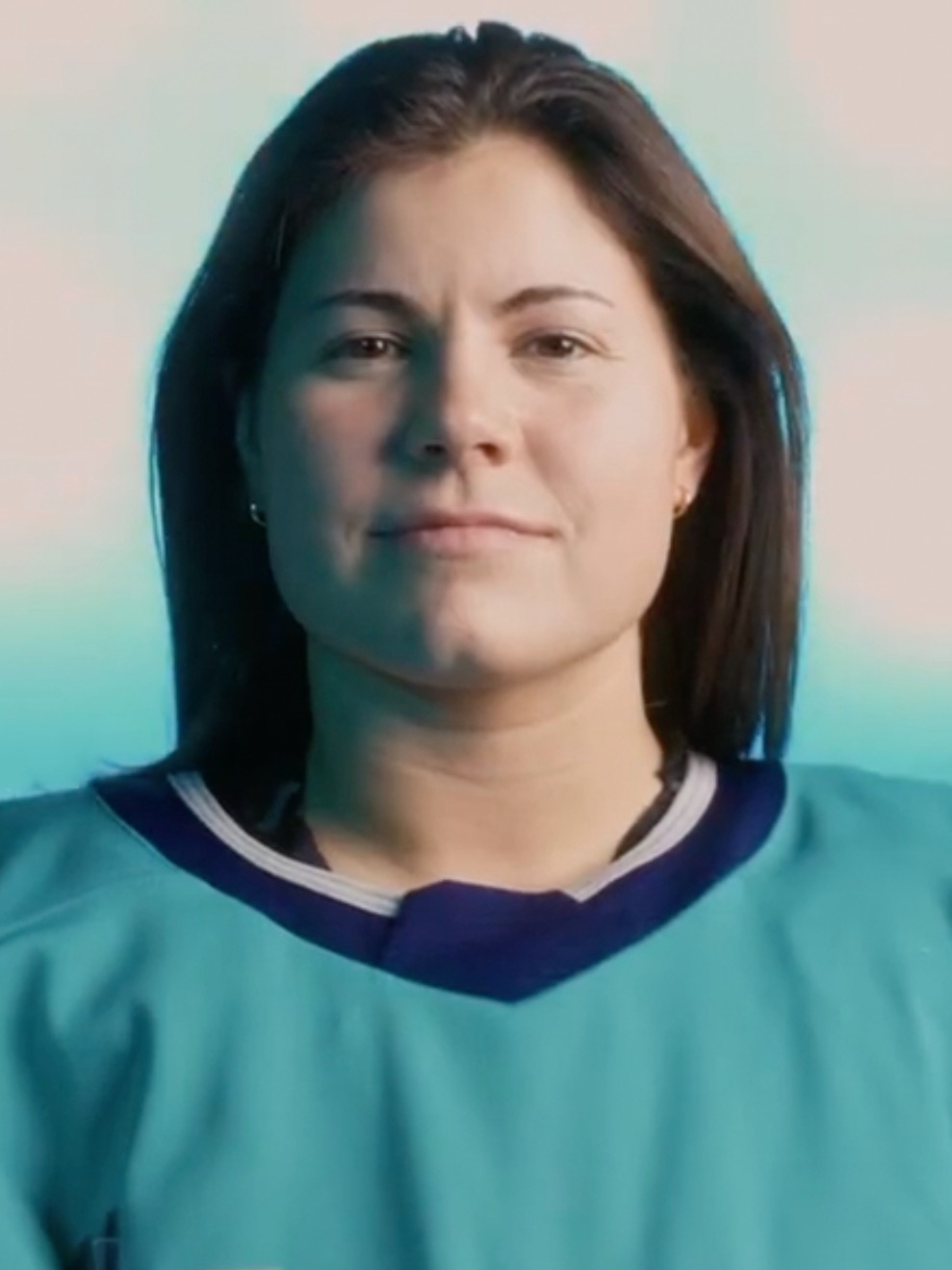
- Roque with PWHL New York in 2024
- Born: September 25, 1997 (age 28) Potsdam, New York, U.S.
- Height: 170.18 cm (5 ft 7.00 in)
- Weight: 82 kg (181 lb; 12 st 13 lb)
- Position: Forward
- Shoots: Right
- PWHL team Former teams: Montreal Victoire; New York Sirens
- National team: United States
- Playing career: 2020–present

Abby Roque (born September 25, 1997) is an American ice hockey player who is a forward for the Montreal Victoire of the Professional Women's Hockey League (PWHL). She is the first indigenous person to play for the United States women's national ice hockey team, making her Olympic debut in 2022.

== Playing career ==
=== Youth ===
Roque began playing hockey at the age of six. Not having any options for girls' hockey, she played on boys' teams growing up. She played for the Sault Area High School Blue Devils in high school. During her freshman year, she was the only freshman to make the varsity hockey team. She was the first and only girl to play on the high school's boys' team. She was an alternate captain in her senior season with the Blue Devils. She tallied 16 goals and 20 assists in her senior year with the Blue Devils for a total of 36 points.

=== College ===
After graduating, she attended the University of Wisconsin, putting up 170 points in 155 NCAA games for the Badgers, twice being named WCHA Offensive Player of the Year. She was named WCHA Rookie of the Year in 2016–17, scoring 28 points in 40 games. In 2019, she scored the game-winning goal in the semi-finals as the university won the NCAA championship. She was named USCHO Division I Women's Player of the Year and USA Hockey's Women's Hockey Player of the Year in 2020, as well as being a top-3 finalist for the 2020 Patty Kazmaier Memorial Award.

=== Professional ===
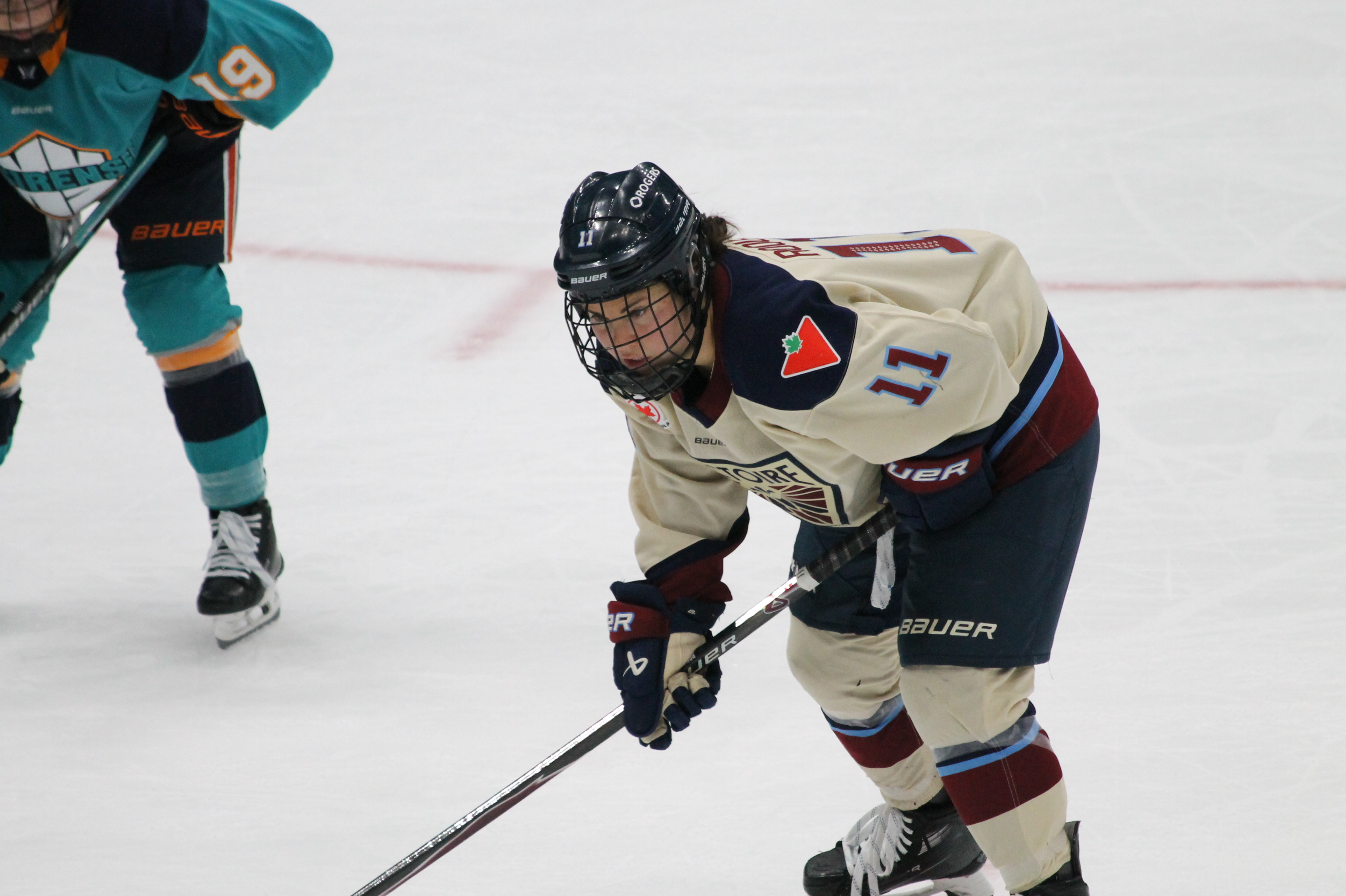
Roque with the Montreal Victoire in 2026

After graduating, Roque joined the PWHPA, being named to the Team Minnesota roster ahead of the 2020–21 season. With Minnesota, Roque participated in a PWHPA Dream Gap Tour event at New York's Madison Square Garden on February 28, 2021, the first professional women's ice hockey event at the venue. Playing for a team sponsored by Adidas, Roque logged a goal and two assists in a 4–3 loss.

In September 2023, following the end of the PWHPA strike and creation of the PWHL, PWHL New York announced that they had signed Roque to a 3-year deal with an undisclosed salary.

On March 22, 2025 Roque scored the first Michigan goal in PWHL history. During the 2024–25 season, she recorded six goals and 11 assists in 30 games for the Sirens. On June 24, 2025, Roque was traded to the Montreal Victoire in exchange for Kristin O'Neill and a fourth round pick in the 2025 PWHL Draft. She scored two of Montreal's four goals in the Victoire's final game of the 2026 playoffs and was named the first star of the game, helping them secure that season's Walter Cup. With eight points in nine playoff games, she tied teammate Marie-Philip Poulin for the postseason scoring lead.

== International play ==
Medal record

Representing United States

Women's ice hockey

Olympic Games
| Silver medal – second place | 2022 Beijing | Team |

World Championships
| Gold medal – first place | 2023 Canada | |
| Silver medal – second place | 2021 Canada | |
| Silver medal – second place | 2022 Denmark | |

World U18 Championships
| Gold medal – first place | 2015 United States | |
| Silver medal – second place | 2014 Hungary | |

Roque represented the United States at the 2014 and 2015 IIHF World Women's U18 Championship, winning gold in 2015. She participated in the 2019-20 Rivalry Series for the senior American national team and was named to the roster for the 2020 IIHF Women's World Championship before it was canceled due to the COVID-19 pandemic.

On January 2, 2022, Roque was named to Team USA's roster to represent the United States at the 2022 Winter Olympics.

== Personal life ==
Roque is the daughter of Jim Roque, a former NCAA ice hockey coach who now works as a pro scout for the Toronto Maple Leafs of the National Hockey League. She grew up in Sault Ste. Marie, Michigan. She is a member of the Wahnapitae First Nation. Roque has a bachelor's degree in marketing from the University of Wisconsin.

== Career statistics ==
=== Regular season and playoffs ===
| | | | Regular season | | | | | Playoffs |
| Season | Team | League | GP | G | A | Pts | PIM | GP | G | A | Pts | PIM |
|---|---|---|---|---|---|---|---|---|---|---|---|---|
| 2016–17 | University of Wisconsin | WCHA | 40 | 8 | 20 | 28 | 38 | — | — | — | — | — |
| 2017–18 | University of Wisconsin | WCHA | 38 | 11 | 30 | 41 | 40 | — | — | — | — | — |
| 2018–19 | University of Wisconsin | WCHA | 41 | 11 | 32 | 43 | 28 | — | — | — | — | — |
| 2019–20 | University of Wisconsin | WCHA | 31 | 20 | 22 | 42 | 22 | — | — | — | — | — |
| 2020–21 | Minnesota | PWHPA | 6 | 6 | 5 | 11 | 4 | — | — | — | — | — |
| 2022–23 | Team Sonnet | PWHPA | 20 | 7 | 9 | 16 | 12 | — | — | — | — | — |
| 2023–24 | PWHL New York | PWHL | 24 | 6 | 7 | 13 | 31 | — | — | — | — | — |
| 2024–25 | New York Sirens | PWHL | 30 | 6 | 11 | 17 | 6 | — | — | — | — | — |
| 2025–26 | Montreal Victoire | PWHL | 29 | 8 | 14 | 22 | 31 | 9 | 4 | 4 | 8 | 6 |
| PWHL totals | | | 83 | 20 | 32 | 52 | 68 | 9 | 4 | 4 | 8 | 6 |

=== International ===
| Year | Team | Event | Result | GP | G | A | Pts | PIM |
|---|---|---|---|---|---|---|---|---|
| 2014 | United States | U18 | 2nd place, silver medalist(s) | 5 | 1 | 2 | 3 | 2 |
| 2015 | United States | U18 | 1st place, gold medalist(s) | 5 | 0 | 2 | 2 | 4 |
| 2021 | United States | WC | 2nd place, silver medalist(s) | 6 | 0 | 1 | 1 | 0 |
| 2022 | United States | OG | 2nd place, silver medalist(s) | 7 | 1 | 2 | 3 | 4 |
| 2022 | United States | WC | 2nd place, silver medalist(s) | 7 | 5 | 3 | 8 | 4 |
| 2023 | United States | WC | 1st place, gold medalist(s) | 7 | 3 | 6 | 9 | 2 |
| Junior totals | | | | 10 | 1 | 4 | 5 | 6 |
| Senior totals | | | | 27 | 9 | 12 | 21 | 10 |

== Awards and honors ==
| Award | Year | Ref |
NCAA
| NCAA All-Tournament Team | 2019 | |
| Preseason WCHA Co-Player of the Year | 2020 | |
| All-WCHA First Team | 2020 | |
| First Team All-American | 2020 | |
| WCHA Player of the Year | 2020 | |
| USCHO D-1 Women's Player of the Year | 2020 | |
USA Hockey
| Bob Allen Women's Player of the Year Award | 2020 | |
PWHL
| Walter Cup champion | 2026 | |
