= New York Sirens =

PWHL ice hockey team in the New York metropolitan area

- City: Newark, New Jersey
- League: PWHL
- Conference: Eastern
- Founded: 2023
- Home arena: Prudential Center
- Colors: Turquoise, navy blue, white, orange
- Owner: Mark Walter Group
- General manager: Pascal Daoust
- Head coach: Greg Fargo
- Captain: Micah Zandee-Hart
- Media: MSG Networks
- Website: newyork.thepwhl.com

Championships
- Regular season titles: 0
- Walter Cups: 0

The New York Sirens are a professional ice hockey team based in the New York metropolitan area that competes in the Professional Women's Hockey League (PWHL). They are one of the six charter franchises of the league. The team plays its home games at Prudential Center in Newark, New Jersey.

== History ==
=== Founding and inaugural season ===
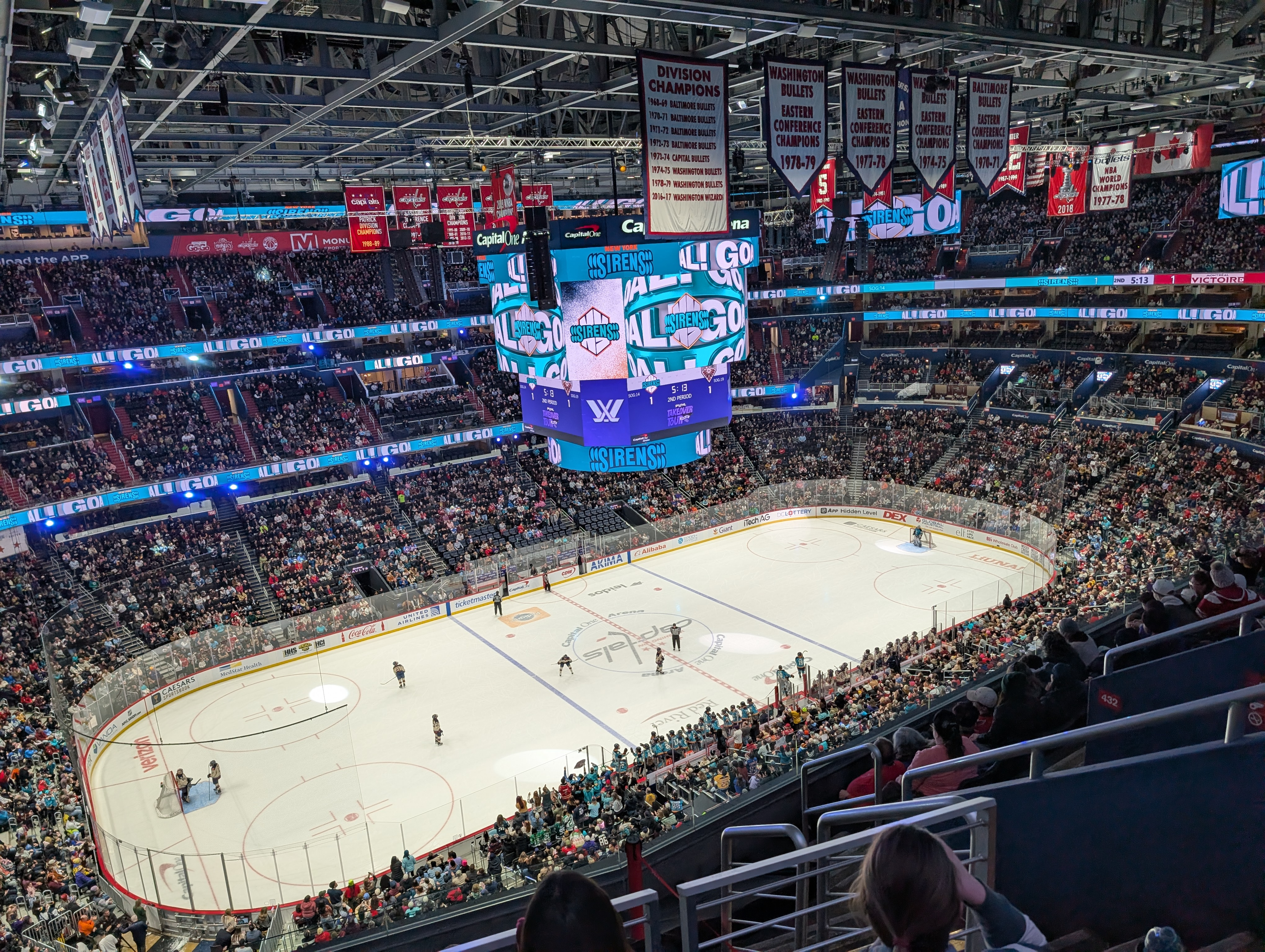
New York vs Montreal Victoire at Capital One Arena, Washington, DC in 2026

On August 29, 2023, the PWHL revealed that one of its first six charter franchises would be located in the New York metropolitan area. The league announced on September 1 that Pascal Daoust, the former general manager for the QMJHL's Val-d'Or Foreurs, would be the team's inaugural general manager. On September 15, Howie Draper was named as the team's first head coach, taking a leave of absence from his position as head coach of the University of Alberta program to take the position. Each PWHL team was permitted three signings during the free agency period ahead of the 2023 PWHL Draft. On September 8, the team announced the signing of its first three players, United States national team members Alex Carpenter and Abby Roque, and Canadian national team member Micah Zandee-Hart. The draft was held on September 18; New York's first selection, at fourth overall, was defender Ella Shelton.

In November 2023, it was revealed that New York's colors would be turquoise, navy blue, and white. Later that month, the team announced that it would play its home games at Total Mortgage Arena in Bridgeport, Connecticut, with four games at UBS Arena in Elmont, New York. On December 21, the team announced that Zandee-Hart would be its first captain, and that Carpenter and Shelton would be serve as alternate captains.

New York played in the league's first ever game, a 4–0 victory over PWHL Toronto on New Year's Day 2024. Shelton scored the first goal in league history, and Corinne Schroeder recorded the league's first shutout. The team hosted its first home game at Total Mortgage Arena on January 5, losing a rematch to Toronto by a score of 3–2. New York would be the first team eliminated from playoff contention on April 24. The team secured the first overall pick at the 2024 PWHL draft with a victory over PWHL Ottawa on April 30. At the draft, New York used the first overall pick to select Princeton standout Sarah Fillier. At the end of the season, the team announced that it had agreed to part ways with coach Draper; in June, New York hired former Colgate Raiders coach Greg Fargo as its new head coach.

On September 13, 2024, it was announced that the Sirens would play the majority of its 2024–25 home games at the Prudential Center in Newark, New Jersey, which was used for two games in April 2024. The club also announced they would move their practice facility to the Richard J. Codey Arena in West Orange.

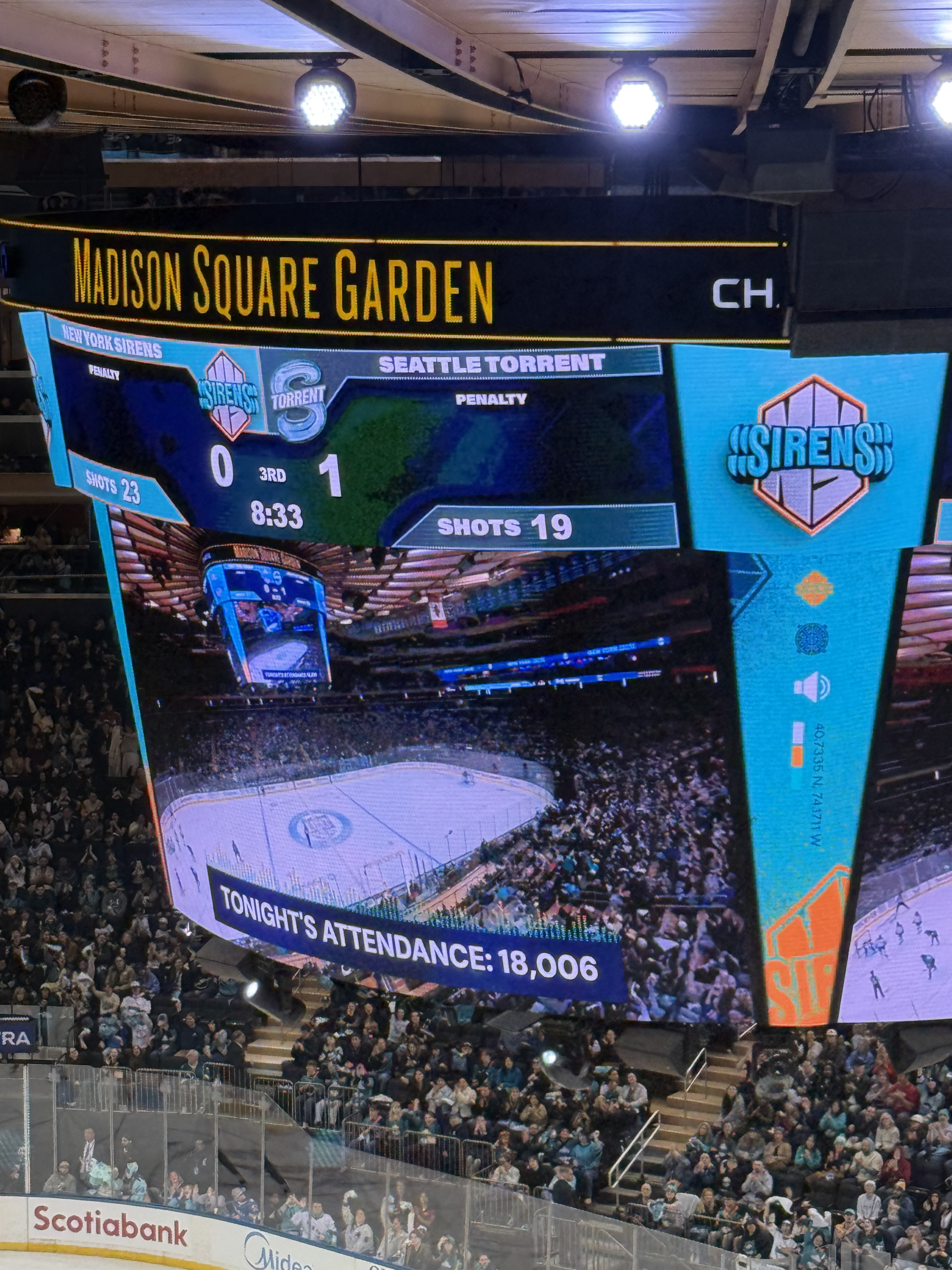
Photo of the screen at Madison Square Garden showing the attendance record from April 4, 2026

On April 4, 2026, the Sirens defeated the Seattle Torrent in an overtime shootout, 2–1. This game was held at Madison Square Garden and set the attendance record at a U.S. Professional Women's Hockey game, 18,006 attendees.

== Season-by-season record ==
Key of colors and symbols
Color/symbol	Explanation
†	Indicates League Championship
*	Indicates Regular Season Championship

Year by year results
Season	GP	RW	OW	OL	RL	Pts	GF	GA	GD	Finish	Playoffs
2023–24	24	5	4	3	12	26	53	67	−14	6th	Did not qualify
2024–25	30	8	4	5	13	37	71	80	−9	6th	Did not qualify
2025–26	30	9	3	3	15	31	63	83	−20	7th	Did not qualify

== Team identity ==
Inaugural season logo for PWHL New York.

New York, like all PWHL charter franchises, operated without unique branding for the league's inaugural season—the team was known as PWHL New York and wore a league-wide jersey template that featured the city's name diagonally on the front. The team did have its own colour scheme, featuring turquoise and black. In October 2023, the league registered a trademark for the name New York Sound. However, in September 2024, when the PWHL unveiled franchise nicknames, New York was given the name Sirens; the league stated that the nickname was a reference to New York City's "vibrant sights and sounds". A report from The Hockey News stated that other names in contention for New York included Rush and Odyssey. The team added orange to its color scheme, and also unveiled a logo featuring stylized "NY" initials and the team's nickname.

== Players and personnel ==
=== Current roster ===
As of July 23, 2026

No.	Nat	Player	Pos	S/G	Age	Acquired	Birthplace
22	(United States)	Anna Bargman	F	L	24	2025	Boxford, Massachusetts
16	(United States)	Lauren Bernard	D	L	25	2025	Madison, Ohio
-	(Canada)	Naomi Boucher	F	L	22	2026	Rimouski, Quebec
14	(Canada)	Jaime Bourbonnais (A)	D	R	28	2023	Mississauga, Ontario
29	(Canada)	Elaine Chuli	G	L	32	2026	Waterford, Ontario
41	(United States)	Clair DeGeorge	F	L	27	2026	Anchorage, Alaska
-	(Canada)	Carina DiAntonio	F	L	22	2026	Mississauga, Ontario
39	(United States)	Kaley Doyle	G	L	25	2025	Livonia, Michigan
29	(Canada)	Emmy Fecteau	F	L	27	2024	Saint-Odilon-de-Cranbourne, Quebec
10	(Canada)	Sarah Fillier (A)	F	R	26	2024	Georgetown, Ontario
4	(United States)	Elle Hartje	F	L	25	2024	Detroit, Michigan
-	(Finland)	Elisa Holopainen	F	L	24	2026	Tuusniemi, Finland
98	(Czech Republic)	Kristýna Kaltounková	F	L	24	2025	Vlašim, Czech Republic
44	(Czech Republic)	Denisa Křížová	F	L	31	2026	Horni Cerekev, Czechia
19	(United States)	Paetyn Levis	F	R	26	2023	Rogers, Minnesota
26	(United States)	Casey O'Brien	C	L	25	2025	Milton, Massachusetts
-	(United States)	Emma Peschel	D	L	22	2026	Edina, Minnesota
8	(Sweden)	Maja Nylén Persson	D	R	25	2024	Avesta, Sweden
-	(United States)	Katelyn Roberts	F	R	22	2026	Chanhassen, Minnesota
2	(Canada)	Dayle Ross	D	L	23	2025	Spirit River, Alberta
37	(United States)	Callie Shanahan	G	L	23	2025	Commerce Township, Michigan
-	(United States)	Makenna Webster	F	R	24	2026	St. Louis, Missouri
-	(United States)	Grace Wolfe	D	R	23	2026	Owatonna, Minnesota
11	(Switzerland)	Nicole Vallario	D	L	25	2026	Lugano, Switzerland
28	(Canada)	Micah Zandee-Hart (C)	D	L	29	2023	Saanichton, British Columbia

=== Reserves ===
As of April 14, 2026

No.	Nat	Player	Pos	S/G	Age	Acquired	Birthplace
62	(Canada)	Sarah Bujold	F	L	30	2026	Riverview, New Brunswick
55	(Canada)	Kira Juodikis	F	R	23	2026	LaSalle, Ontario

=== Team captains ===
- Micah Zandee-Hart, 2023–present

=== General managers ===
- Pascal Daoust, 2023–present

=== Head coaches ===
- Howie Draper, 2023–2024
- Greg Fargo, 2024–present

=== First-round draft picks ===
- 2023: Ella Shelton (4th overall)
- 2024: Sarah Fillier (1st overall)
- 2025: Kristýna Kaltounková (1st overall), Casey O'Brien (3rd overall)
- 2026: Emma Peschel (7th overall)

== Awards and honors ==
- Alex Carpenter – 2024 PWHL First All-Star Team
- Ella Shelton – 2024 PWHL First All-Star Team
- Sarah Fillier – 2025 PWHL Scoring Champion (tied with Hilary Knight)
- Sarah Fillier – 2025 PWHL Rookie of the Year
