= 2018–19 Lindenwood Lady Lions ice hockey season =

2018–19 Lindenwood Lady Lions women's ice hockey season
- Conference: 6 College Hockey America
- Home ice: Lindenwood Ice Arena

Record
- Overall: 7–24–4
- Conference: 3–14–3
- Home: 6–7–3
- Road: 1–14–1
- Neutral: 0–1–0

Coaches and captains
- Head coach: Scott Spencer
- Assistant coaches: Corey Whitaker; Greg Haney
- Captain(s): Courtney Ganske; Shannon Morris-Reade
- Alternate captain(s): Alexandra Larson; Megan Wagner

The Lindenwood Lady Lions women represented Lindenwood University in CHA women's ice hockey during the 2018-19 NCAA Division I women's ice hockey season. The team struggled with their record, with nine newcomers, and a team made up of very young players.

== Offseason ==
=== Recruiting ===
Player	Position	Nationality	Notes
Annika Asplundh	Goaltender	United States	Former Netminder with New Jersey Colonials
Jada Burke	Forward	Canada	Played for the Nepean Wildcats
Taylor Kirwan	Defense	Canada	Represented Canada at the U18 World Championships
Kayla Martinez	Defense	United States	with USA National Development Camp 2014–16
Maddison Stitt	Defense	Canada	Defender for Ottawa Lady Senators
Sophie Wolf	Goaltender	Canada	Gold medalist with U18 Team Ontario Red

=== Transfers ===
Player	Position	Nationality	Notes
Nikki Friesen	Forward	United States	Graduate Student from Harvard University
Nicole Guagliardo	Forward	United States	Transfer from CHA rival Mercyhurst

== Standings ==
2018–19 College Hockey America standings
	Conference							Overall					
	GP	W	L	T	PTS	GF	GA	GP	W	L	T	GF	GA
Robert Morris†	20	13	4	3	29	61	35	36	16	14	6	92	87
Mercyhurst	20	12	6	2	26	54	46	34	15	14	5	88	96
Syracuse*	20	10	8	2	22	55	54	38	13	22	3	89	126
Penn State	20	6	9	5	17	36	43	36	13	14	9	73	72
RIT	20	8	11	1	17	40	46	35	12	18	5	67	84
Lindenwood	20	3	14	3	9	43	65	33	7	22	4	75	93
Championship: March 8, 2019 † indicates conference regular season champion; * indicates conference tournament champion Rankings: USCHO.com

== Roster ==
=== 2018–19 Lady Lions ===
No.	Nat.	Player	Class	Pos	Height	DoB	Hometown	Previous team
1		Annika Asplundh	Freshman	G	5' 7" (1.7 m)		New Hope, Pennsylvania	New Jersey Colonials
2		Kirsten Martin	Junior	F	5' 8" (1.73 m)		Rosedale, British Columbia	Pacific Steelers
4		Nikki Friesen	Graduate	F	5' 4" (1.63 m)		Corvallis, Oregon	Harvard
7		Sierra Burt	Sophomore	F	5' 6" (1.68 m)		Bayside, Ontario	Team Ontario Blue
8		Maddison Stitt	Freshman	D	5' 10" (1.78 m)		Ottawa, Ontario	Ottawa Lady Senators
9		Jordyn Pimm	Junior	F	5' 8" (1.73 m)		Ottawa, Ontario	Ottawa Lady Senators
10		Nicole Guagliardo	Junior	F	5' 8" (1.73 m)		Hoffman Estates, Illinois	Mercyhurst
11		Erin Near	Junior	F	5' 6" (1.68 m)		New Hamburg, Ontario	Toronto Jr. Aeros
12		Alexandra Larson (A)	Senior	F	5' 6" (1.68 m)		West Vancouver, British Columbia	Pursuit of Excellence
13		Megan Wagner (A)	Sophomore	F	5' 1" (1.55 m)		Niles, Illinois	Chicago Mission
14		Jane Jacobs	Freshman	D	5' 6" (1.68 m)		Carseland, Alberta	Edge School
16		Cierra Paisley	Junior	F	5' 6" (1.68 m)		Shawnigan Lake, British Columbia	Vancouver Comets
17		Taylor Girard	Junior	F	5' 10" (1.78 m)		Macomb, Michigan	Detroit Honeybaked
18		Lillian Marchant	Junior	F	5' 6" (1.68 m)		Tustin, California	Anaheim Lady Ducks
19		Hannah Alt	Sophomore	F	5' 3" (1.6 m)		Belvidere, Illinois	Chicago Mission
22		Courtney Ganske (C)	Junior	F	5' 6" (1.68 m)		Killarney, Manitoba	Westman Wildcats
23		Shannon Morris-Reade (C)	Senior	F	5' 8" (1.73 m)		Port Coquitlam, British Columbia	Team British Columbia U18
24		Jada Burke	Freshman	F	6' 0" (1.83 m)		Nepean, Ontario	Nepean Wildcats
25		Taylor Kirwan	Freshman	D	5' 8" (1.73 m)		Gull Lake, Saskatchewan	Team Canada U18
26		Kayla Martinez	Freshman	D	5' 7" (1.7 m)		Livonia, Michigan	Detroit Honeybaked
27		Carla Goodwin	Senior	F	5' 10" (1.78 m)		Fort St. James, British Columbia	Pursuit of Excellence
30		Jolene deBruyn	Senior	G	5' 9" (1.75 m)		Grande Prairie, Alberta	Team Alberta U18
31		Sophie Wolf	Freshman	G	5' 8" (1.73 m)		Nepean, Ontario	Nepean Wildcats
39		Lauren Hennessey	Sophomore	G	5' 8" (1.73 m)		Lynnfield, Massachusetts	Boston Jr. Shamrocks

== Schedule ==
Date	Opponent^{#}	Rank^{#}	Site	Decision	Result	Record
Regular Season
September 28	at #2 Wisconsin*		LaBahn Arena • Madison, WI	Jolene deBruyn	L 2–3	0–1–0
September 29	at #2 Wisconsin*		LaBahn Arena • Madison, WI	Sophie Wolf	L 0–6	0–2–0
October 5	at Union*		Achilles Center • Schenectady, NY	Jolene deBruyn	W 4–1	1–2–0
October 6	at Union*		Achilles Center • Schenectady, NY	Sophie Wolf	L 2–3	1–3–0
October 19	Syracuse		Lindenwood Ice Arena • Wentzville, MO	Jolene deBruyn	L 4–5 ^{OT}	1–4–0 (0–1–0)
October 20	Syracuse		Lindenwood Ice Arena • Wentzville, MO	Jolene deBruyn	L 3–6	1–5–0 (0–2–0)
October 26	at Robert Morris		Colonials Arena • Neville Township, PA	Jolene deBruyn	T 2–2 ^{OT}	1–5–1 (0–2–1)
October 27	at Robert Morris		Colonials Arena • Neville Township, PA	Jolene deBruyn	L 0–2	1–6–1 (0–3–1)
November 3	Mercyhurst		Lindenwood Ice Arena • Wentzville, MO	Jolene deBruyn	W 4–1	2–6–1 (1–3–1)
November 4	Mercyhurst		Lindenwood Ice Arena • Wentzville, MO	Jolene deBruyn	L 0–5	2–7–1 (1–4–1)
November 9	St. Cloud State*		Lindenwood Ice Arena • Wentzville, MO	Sophie Wolf	T 2–2 ^{OT}	2–7–2
November 10	St. Cloud State*		Lindenwood Ice Arena • Wentzville, MO	Jolene deBruyn	W 2–1 ^{OT}	3–7–2
November 23	Minnesota State*		Lindenwood Ice Arena • Wentzville, MO	Sophie Wolf	L 0–1	3–8–2
November 24	Minnesota State*		Lindenwood Ice Arena • Wentzville, MO	Jolene deBruyn	L 0–2	3–9–2
November 30	at RIT		Gene Polisseni Center • Rochester, NY	Sophie Wolf	L 2–5	3–10–2 (1–5–1)
December 1	at RIT		Gene Polisseni Center • Rochester, NY	Sophie Wolf	L 2–3	3–11–2 (1–6–1)
December 29	at St. Cloud State*		Herb Brooks National Hockey Center • St. Cloud, MN	Sophie Wolf	L 1–3	3–12–2
December 30	at St. Cloud State*		Herb Brooks National Hockey Center • St. Cloud, MN	Sophie Wolf	L 1–2	3–13–2
January 5, 2019	Post*		Lindenwood Ice Arena • Wentzville, MO	Sophie Wolf	W 12–0	4–13–2
January 6	Post*		Lindenwood Ice Arena • Wentzville, MO	Sophie Wolf	W 5–0	5–13–2
January 20	at Penn State		Pegula Ice Arena • University Park, PA	Sophie Wolf	L 0–3	5–14–2 (1–7–1)
January 21	at Penn State		Pegula Ice Arena • University Park, PA	Sophie Wolf	L 1–2	5–15–2 (1–8–1)
January 25	at Mercyhurst		Mercyhurst Ice Center • Erie, PA	Sophie Wolf	L 0–2	5–16–2 (1–9–1)
January 26	at Mercyhurst		Mercyhurst Ice Center • Erie, PA	Sophie Wolf	L 2–4	5–17–2 (1–10–1)
February 8	RIT		Lindenwood Ice Arena • Wentzville, MO	Sophie Wolf	W 3–2	6–17–2 (2–10–1)
February 9	RIT		Lindenwood Ice Arena • Wentzville, MO	Sophie Wolf	L 3–4	6–18–2 (2–11–1)
February 15	Robert Morris		Lindenwood Ice Arena • Wentzville, MO	Sophie Wolf	T 2–2 ^{OT}	6–18–3 (2–11–2)
February 16	Robert Morris		Lindenwood Ice Arena • Wentzville, MO	Sophie Wolf	W 6–1	7–18–3 (3–11–2)
February 22	at Syracuse		Tennity Ice Skating Pavilion • Syracuse, NY	Sophie Wolf	L 4–5 ^{OT}	7–19–3 (3–12–2)
February 23	at Syracuse		Tennity Ice Skating Pavilion • Syracuse, NY	Sophie Wolf	L 1–5	7–20–3 (3–13–2)
March 1	at Penn State		Lindenwood Ice Center • Wentzville, MO	Sophie Wolf	L 1–3	7–21–3 (3–14–2)
March 2	at Penn State		Lindenwood Ice Center • Wentzville, MO	Sophie Wolf	T 3–3 ^{OT}	7–21–4 (3–14–3)
CHA Tournament
March 6	vs. Syracuse*		LECOM Harborcenter • Buffalo, NY (Quarterfinal Game)	Sophie Wolf	L 1–4	7–22–4
*Non-conference game. ^{#}Rankings from USCHO.com Poll.

== Awards and honors ==
Sophomore Sierra Burt was named to the All-CHA Second Team. Burt was a power play specialist with four multi-point games.

Forward Jada Burke, Defender Taylor Kirwan and Goaltender Sophie Wolf were all named to the All-Rookie Team.
