= 2018–19 Syracuse Orange women's ice hockey season =

CHA Tournament Champions 8th Seed, Lost to #1 Wisconsin 0-4
- Conference: 3rd College Hockey America
- Home ice: Tennity Ice Skating Pavilion

Record
- Overall: 13-22-3
- Conference: 10–8–2
- Home: 4-8-3
- Road: 6-13-0
- Neutral: 3-1-0

Coaches and captains
- Head coach: Paul Flanagan 11th season
- Assistant coaches: Julie Knerr; Brendon Knight
- Captain(s): Allie Munroe; Lindsay Eastwood
- Alternate captain: Brooke Avery

The Syracuse Orange women represented Syracuse University in CHA women's ice hockey during the 2018-19 NCAA Division I women's ice hockey season. The Orange earned the first trip to the NCAA Tournament in program history.

== Offseason ==
Captain Allie Munroe participated on Hockey Canada's National Women's Development Team Selection Camp and the Hockey Canada's National Women's Team Fall Festival.

=== Recruiting ===
Player	Position	Nationality	Notes
Lauren Bellefontaine	Forward	Canada	One of 3 recruits from Nepean Jr. Wildcats
Shelby Calof	Defense	Canada	Blue-liner for Nepean
Anonda Hoppner	Forward	Canada	Transfer from Colgate
Marielle McHale	Forward	United States	Williston Northampton grad
Abby Moloughney	Forward	Canada	Named to Team Canada U18
Allison Small	Goaltender	Canada	Mid-Season Transfer from Quinnipiac

== Standings ==
2018–19 College Hockey America standings
	Conference							Overall					
	GP	W	L	T	PTS	GF	GA	GP	W	L	T	GF	GA
Robert Morris†	20	13	4	3	29	61	35	36	16	14	6	92	87
Mercyhurst	20	12	6	2	26	54	46	34	15	14	5	88	96
Syracuse*	20	10	8	2	22	55	54	38	13	22	3	89	126
Penn State	20	6	9	5	17	36	43	36	13	14	9	73	72
RIT	20	8	11	1	17	40	46	35	12	18	5	67	84
Lindenwood	20	3	14	3	9	43	65	33	7	22	4	75	93
Championship: March 8, 2019 † indicates conference regular season champion; * indicates conference tournament champion Rankings: USCHO.com

== Roster ==
=== 2018–19 Orange ===
No.	Nat.	Player	Class	Pos	Height	DoB	Hometown	Previous team
2		Logan Hicks	Junior	D	5' 9" (1.75 m)		Scottsdale, Arizona	St. Louis Lady Blues
3		Amanda Bäckebo	Junior	D	5' 3" (1.6 m)		Ganef, Sweden	Swedish National Team U18
4		Lindsay Eastwood (C)	Junior (RS)	D	6' 1" (1.85 m)		Kanata, Ontario	Team Canada U18
6		Shelby Calof	Freshman	D	5' 8" (1.73 m)		Ottawa, Ontario	Nepean Jr. Wildcats
7		Emma Polaski	Sophomore	F	5' 7" (1.7 m)		Morristown, New Jersey	New Jersey Colonials
8		Lauren Bellefontaine	Freshman	F	5' 6" (1.68 m)		Kemptville, Ontario	Nepean Jr. Wildcats
9		Allie Munroe (C)	Senior	D	5' 7" (1.7 m)		Yarmouth, Nova Scotia	New Hampton
11		Kelli Rowswell	Junior	F	5' 9" (1.75 m)		Winnipeg, Manitoba	Team Manitoba U18
12		Kristen Siermachesky	Sophomore	F	5' 11" (1.8 m)		New Liskeard, Ontario	Stoney Creek Jr. Sabres
13		Abby Moloughney	Freshman	F	5' 6" (1.68 m)		Ottawa, Ontario	Team Canada U18
14		Savannah Rennie	Junior	F	5' 7" (1.7 m)		East St. Paul, Manitoba	Team Manitoba U18
15		Sarah Stuehr	Senior	F	5' 4" (1.63 m)		Westwood, Massachusetts	Warner Hockey School
18		Allie Olnowich	Junior	D	5' 7" (1.7 m)		Chatham, New Jersey	New Jersey Rockets
19		Dakota Derrer	Graduate	D	5' 7" (1.7 m)		Mancelona, Michigan	Traverse City-St. Francis
20		Anonda Hoppner	Junior	F	5' 10" (1.78 m)		Carp, Ontario	Colgate
21		Brooke Avery (A)	Senior (RS)	F	5' 10" (1.78 m)		Concord, New Hampshire	New Hampshire
22		Jessica DiGirolamo	Sophomore	D	5' 9" (1.75 m)		Mississauga, Ontario	Oakville Jr. Hornets
23		Marielle McHale	Freshman	F	5' 10" (1.78 m)		Clifton Park, New York	Williston Northampton School
27		Victoria Klimek	Sophomore	F	5' 8" (1.73 m)		Orangeville, Ontario	Oakville Jr. Hornets
30		Maddi Welch	Senior	G	5' 7" (1.7 m)		East Amherst, New York	Niagara Jr. Purple Eagles
31		Allison Small	Sophomore	G	5' 9" (1.75 m)		Nestleton, Ontario	Quinnipiac
32		Ady Cohen	Junior	G	5' 6" (1.68 m)		Boynton Beach, Florida	Gilmour Academy

== 2018-19 Schedule ==
Date	Opponent^{#}	Rank^{#}	Site	Decision	Result	Record
Regular Season
October 6	at #6 Boston College*		Kelley Rink • Chestnut Hill, MA	Maddi Welch	L 1-5	0–1–0
October 12	Mercyhurst		Tennity Ice Skating Pavilion • Syracuse, NY	Maddi Welch	L 2-4	0–2–0 (0–1–0)
October 13	Mercyhurst		Tennity Ice Skating Pavilion • Syracuse, NY	Ady Cohen	L 0-1	0–3–0 (0–2–0)
October 19	at Lindenwood		Lindenwood Ice Arena • Wentzville, MO	Ady Cohen	W 5-4 ^{OT}	1–3–0 (1–2–0)
October 20	at Lindenwood		Lindenwood Ice Arena • Wentzville, MO	Maddi Welch	W 6-3	2–3–0 (2–2–0)
October 23	at #7 Cornell*		Lynah Rink • Ithaca, NY	Ady Cohen	L 1-4	2–4–0
October 26	#2 Clarkson*		Tennity Ice Skating Pavilion • Syracuse, NY	Ady Cohen	L 2-6	2–5–0
October 27	at #2 Clarkson*		Cheel Arena • Potsdam, NY	Maddi Welch	L 3-4 ^{OT}	2–6–0
November 3	at Penn State		Pegula Ice Arena • University Park, PA	Maddi Welch	W 1-0	3–6–0 (3–2–0)
November 4	at Penn State		Pegula Ice Arena • University Park, PA	Maddi Welch	W 5-2	4–6–0 (4–2–0)
November 10	Princeton*		Tennity Ice Skating Pavilion • Syracuse, NY	Maddi Welch	T 1-1 ^{OT}	4–6–1
November 11	Princeton*		Tennity Ice Skating Pavilion • Syracuse, NY	Maddi Welch	L 3-5	4–7–1
November 16	RIT		Tennity Ice Skating Pavilion • Syracuse, NY	Maddi Welch	L 4-6	4–8–1 (4–3–0)
November 23	at Vermont*		Gutterson Fieldhouse • Burlington, VT (Windjammer Classic, Opening Round)	Maddi Welch	L 0-2	4–9–1
November 24	vs. #8 St. Lawrence*		Gutterson Fieldhouse • Burlington, VT (Windjammer Classic, Consolation Game)	Maddi Welch	L 0-4	4–10–1
December 1	at #1 Wisconsin*		LaBahn Arena • Madison, WI	Maddi Welch	L 1-6	4–11–1
December 2	at #1 Wisconsin*		LaBahn Arena • Madison, WI	Maddi Welch	L 1-9	4–13–1
December 6	#10 Colgate*		Tennity Ice Skating Pavilion • Syracuse, NY	Maddi Welch	L 2-5	4–13–1
December 8	at #10 Colgate*		Class of 1965 Arena • Hamilton, NY	Maddi Welch	L 2-4	4–14–1
January 8, 2019	at Rensselaer*		Houston Field House • Troy, NY	Ady Cohen	L 1-2	4–15–1
January 11	at RIT		Gene Polisseni Center • Rochester, NY	Allison Small	L 2-4	4–16–1 (4–4–0)
January 18	Robert Morris		Tennity Ice Skating Pavilion • Syracuse, NY	Maddi Welch	W 3-2 ^{OT}	5–16–1 (5–4–0)
January 19	Robert Morris		Tennity Ice Skating Pavilion • Syracuse, NY	Maddi Welch	L 1-5	5–17–1 (5–5–0)
January 25	Penn State		Tennity Ice Skating Pavilion • Syracuse, NY	Maddi Welch	W 2-1	6–17–1 (6–5–0)
January 26	Penn State		Tennity Ice Skating Pavilion • Syracuse, NY	Maddi Welch	T 1-1 ^{OT}	6–17–2 (6–5–1)
January 29	#6 Cornell*		Tennity Ice Skating Pavilion • Syracuse, NY	Allison Small	L 2-5	6–18–2
February 8	at Mercyhurst		Mercyhurst Ice Center • Erie, PA	Maddi Welch	W 6-5	7–18–2 (7–5–1)
February 9	at Mercyhurst		Mercyhurst Ice Center • Erie, PA	Ady Cohen	W 4-0	8–18–2 (8–5–1)
February 15	at RIT		Gene Polisseni Center • Rochester, NY	Ady Cohen	L 0-1	8–19–2 (8–6–1)
February 16	RIT		Tennity Ice Skating Pavilion • Syracuse, NY	Ady Cohen	T 1-1 ^{OT}	8–19–3 (8–6–2)
February 22	Lindenwood		Tennity Ice Skating Pavilion • Syracuse, NY	Ady Cohen	W 5-4 ^{OT}	9–19–3 (9–6–2)
February 23	Lindenwood		Tennity Ice Skating Pavilion • Syracuse, NY	Maddi Welch	W 5-1	10–19–3 (10–6–2)
March 1	at Robert Morris		Colonials Arena • Neville Township, PA	Ady Cohen	L 0-5	10–20–3 (10–7–2)
March 2	at Robert Morris		Colonials Arena • Neville Township, PA	Maddi Welch	L 2-4	10–21–3 (10–8–2)
CHA Tournament
March 6	vs. Lindenwood*		HarborCenter • Buffalo, NY (Quarterfinal)	Maddi Welch	W 4–1	11–21–3
March 7	vs. Mercyhurst*		HarborCenter • Buffalo, NY (Semifinal Game)	Ady Cohen	W 4–3	12–21–3
March 8	vs. Robert Morris*		HarborCenter • Buffalo, NY (Semifinal Game)	Ady Cohen	W 6–2	13–21–3
NCAA Tournament
March 16	at #1 Wisconsin*		LaBahn Arena • Madison, WI (Quarterfinal)	Ady Cohen	L 0–4	13–22–3
*Non-conference game. ^{#}Rankings from USCHO.com Poll.
