= 2018–19 RIT Tigers women's ice hockey season =

- Conference: CHA
- Home ice: Gene Polisseni Center, Rochester, NY

Record
- Overall: 12–18–5
- Conference: 8–11–1
- Home: 7–7–2
- Road: 5–10–3
- Neutral: 0–1–0

Coaches and captains
- Head coach: Chad Davis (1st season)
- Assistant coaches: Hannah McGowan
- Captain: Kendall Cornine
- Alternate captain(s): Mallory Rushton; Christa Vuglar

The RIT Tigers represented the Rochester Institute of Technology in College Hockey America during the 2018-19 NCAA Division I women's ice hockey season.

== Offseason ==
- Chad Davis was named Head Coach on August 22.

=== Recruiting ===
Player	Position	Nationality	Notes
Hunter Barnett	Forward	Canada	Scored 11 goals for the 17-18 Mississauga Jr. Chiefs
Abby Davies	Forward	Canada	Played for Ottawa Lady Senators
Madison Itagaki	Defense	United States	Teammate of Venice Rasoulis on Chicago Mission
McKinley Karpa	Forward	United States	Led all Massachusetts High Schoolers with 73 points in 17-18
Venice Rasoulis	Forward	United States	Former member of Chicago Mission
Taylor Sims	Defense	Canada	Blueliner for Ottawa Lady Senators

== Standings ==
2018–19 College Hockey America standings
	Conference							Overall					
	GP	W	L	T	PTS	GF	GA	GP	W	L	T	GF	GA
Robert Morris†	20	13	4	3	29	61	35	36	16	14	6	92	87
Mercyhurst	20	12	6	2	26	54	46	34	15	14	5	88	96
Syracuse*	20	10	8	2	22	55	54	38	13	22	3	89	126
Penn State	20	6	9	5	17	36	43	36	13	14	9	73	72
RIT	20	8	11	1	17	40	46	35	12	18	5	67	84
Lindenwood	20	3	14	3	9	43	65	33	7	22	4	75	93
Championship: March 8, 2019 † indicates conference regular season champion; * indicates conference tournament champion Rankings: USCHO.com

== 2018–19 Tigers ==
No.	Nat.	Player	Class	Pos	Height	DoB	Hometown	Previous team
5		Madison Itagaki	Freshman	D	5' 3" (1.6 m)		Glenview, Illinois	Chicago Mission
6		Stella Haberman	Sophomore	F	5' 3" (1.6 m)		Golden Valley, Minnesota	Minnesota Whitecaps
7		Brooke Baker	Senior	F	5' 8" (1.73 m)		Saline, Michigan	Niagara Jr. Purple Eagles
8		Madison Farrand	Junior	F	5' 4" (1.63 m)		Potomac, Maryland	Washington Pride
9		Brittney Gout	Sophomore	F	5' 3" (1.6 m)		Caledon, Ontario	Brampton Canadettes
10		Kendall Cornine (C)	Senior	F	5' 5" (1.65 m)		Kinnelon, New Jersey	East Coast Wizards
11		Christa Vuglar (A)	Senior	D	5' 3" (1.6 m)		Crystal Lake, Illinois	Chicago Mission
13		Taylor Sims	Freshman	D	5' 5" (1.65 m)		Deep River, Ontario	Ottawa Lady Senators
14		Ellie Larson	Sophomore	D	5' 9" (1.75 m)		Hutchinson, Minnesota	Hutchinson HS
15		Kandice Sheriff	Senior	F	5' 9" (1.75 m)		Brampton, Ontario	Leaside Wildcats
16		Claudia Black	Junior	F	5' 5" (1.65 m)		Newmarket, Ontario	Toronto Jr. Aeros
17		Taylor Baker	Junior	F	5' 4" (1.63 m)		Toronto, Ontario	Toronto Jr. Aeros
18		Abby Davies	Freshman	F	5' 5" (1.65 m)		Ashton, Ontario	Ottawa Lady Senators
19		Hunter Barnett	Freshman	F	5' 6" (1.68 m)		Caledon, Ontario	Mississauga Jr. Chiefs
20		Mallory Rushton (A)	Senior	F	5' 2" (1.57 m)		Amherst, Nova Scotia	New Hampton Prep
21		Logan Land	Senior	F	5' 7" (1.7 m)		Turkey Point, Ontario	Burlington Barracudas
22		Jordan Marchese	Sophomore	F	5' 5" (1.65 m)		Mississauga, Ontario	Brampton Canadettes
23		Brinna Dochniak	Senior	F	5' 5" (1.65 m)		Marine on St. Croix, Minnesota	Stillwater Ponies
24		Kathryn Kennedy	Senior	F	5' 5" (1.65 m)		Hamilton, Ontario	Hamilton Hawks
25		Venice Rasoulis	Freshman	F	5' 4" (1.63 m)		Naperville, Illinois	Chicago Mission
26		Baylee Trani	Sophomore	F	5' 2" (1.57 m)		Huntington Beach, California	New England Hockey Club
27		Tori Haywood	Junior	F	5' 3" (1.6 m)		Pickering, Ontario	Toronto Jr. Aeros
28		Jade Mancini	Junior	F	5' 8" (1.73 m)		Burlington, Ontario	Burlington Jr. Barracudas
30		Jessi O'Leary	Sophomore	G	5' 4" (1.63 m)		Woodstock, New Brunswick	Team New Brunswick
31		Jenna de Jonge	Senior	G	5' 10" (1.78 m)		Abbotsford, British Columbia	Pursuit of Excellence
35		Terra Lanteigne	Junior	G	5' 8" (1.73 m)		Hatchet Lake, Nova Scotia	Metro Boston Pizza

== 2018–19 Schedule ==
Date	Opponent^{#}	Rank^{#}	Site	Decision	Result	Record
Regular Season
September 28	Holy Cross*		Gene Polisseni Center • Rochester, NY	Terra Lanteigne	W 2-0	1–0–0
September 29	Holy Cross*		Gene Polisseni Center • Rochester, NY	Terra Lanteigne	T 1-1 ^{OT}	1–0–1
October 5	at St. Cloud State*		Herb Brooks National Hockey Center • St. Cloud, MN	Terra Lanteigne	L 3-7	1–1–1
October 6	at St. Cloud State*		Herb Brooks National Hockey Center • St. Cloud, MN	Terra Lanteigne	L 2-3 ^{OT}	1–2–1
October 19	Union*		Gene Polisseni Center • Rochester, NY	Terra Lanteigne	T 1-1 ^{OT}	1–2–2
October 20	Union*		Gene Polisseni Center • Rochester, NY	Terra Lanteigne	L 2-3	1–3–2
October 26	at Rensselaer*		Houston Field House • Troy, NY	Terra Lanteigne	T 1-1 ^{OT}	1–3–3
October 27	at Rensselaer*		Houston Field House • Troy, NY	Terra Lanteigne	L 2-3	1–4–3
November 2	Robert Morris		Gene Polisseni Center • Rochester, NY	Terra Lanteigne	L 1-3	1–5–3 (0–1–0)
November 3	Robert Morris		Gene Polisseni Center • Rochester, NY	Terra Lanteigne	L 0-3	1–6–3 (0–2–0)
November 9	at Dartmouth*		Thompson Arena • Hanover, NH	Terra Lanteigne	W 5-1	2–6–3
November 10	at Dartmouth*		Thompson Arena • Hanover, NH	Terra Lanteigne	T 2-2 ^{OT}	2–6–4
November 16	at Syracuse		Tennity Ice Skating Pavilion • Syracuse, NY	Terra Lanteigne	W 6-4	3–6–4 (1–2–0)
November 20	at Penn State		Pegula Ice Arena • University Park, PA	Terra Lanteigne	L 0-3	3–7–4 (1–3–0)
November 21	at Penn State		Pegula Ice Arena • University Park, PA	Terra Lanteigne	L 1-2	3–8–4 (1–4–0)
November 30	Lindenwood		Gene Polisseni Center • Rochester, NY	Terra Lanteigne	W 5-2	4–8–4 (2–4–0)
December 1	Lindenwood		Gene Polisseni Center • Rochester, NY	Terra Lanteigne	W 3-2	5–8–4 (3–4–0)
December 7	Boston University*		Gene Polisseni Center • Rochester, NY	Terra Lanteigne	L 1-3	5–9–4
December 8	Boston University*		Gene Polisseni Center • Rochester, NY	Terra Lanteigne	L 0-8	5–10–4
January 4, 2019	at Brown*		Meehan Auditorium • Providence, RI	Terra Lanteigne	W 2-1	6–10–4
January 5	at Brown*		Meehan Auditorium • Providence, RI	Terra Lanteigne	W 2-0	7–10–4
January 11	Syracuse		Gene Polisseni Center • Rochester, NY	Terra Lanteigne	W 4-2	8–10–4 (4–4–0)
January 18	Mercyhurst		Gene Polisseni Center • Rochester, NY	Terra Lanteigne	W 4-2	9–10–4 (5–4–0)
January 25	Robert Morris		Colonials Arena • Neville Township, PA	Terra Lanteigne	L 1-3	9–11–4 (5–5–0)
January 26	Robert Morris		Colonials Arena • Neville Township, PA	Terra Lanteigne	L 0-2	9–12–4 (5–6–0)
February 2	Mercyhurst		Gene Polisseni Center • Rochester, NY	Terra Lanteigne	L 2-3 ^{OT}	9–13–4 (5–7–0)
February 8	at Lindenwood		Lindenwood Ice Arena • Wentzville, MO	Terra Lanteigne	L 2-3	9–14–4 (5–8–0)
February 9	at Lindenwood		Lindenwood Ice Arena • Wentzville, MO	Terra Lanteigne	W 4-3	10–14–4 (6–8–0)
February 15	Syracuse		Gene Polisseni Center • Rochester, NY	Terra Lanteigne	W 1-0	11–14–4 (7–8–0)
February 16	at Syracuse		Tennity Ice Skating Pavilion • Syracuse, NY	Terra Lanteigne	T 1-1 ^{OT}	11–14–5 (7–8–1)
February 22	Penn State		Gene Polisseni Center • Rochester, NY	Terra Lanteigne	W 3-0	12–14–5 (8–8–1)
February 23	Penn State		Gene Polisseni Center • Rochester, NY	Terra Lanteigne	L 1-2	12–15–5 (8–9–1)
March 1	at Mercyhurst		Mercyhurst Ice Center • Erie, PA	Terra Lanteigne	L 0-4	12–16–5 (8–10–1)
March 2	at Mercyhurst		Mercyhurst Ice Center • Erie, PA	Terra Lanteigne	L 1-2	12–17–5 (8–11–1)
CHA Tournament
March 6	vs. Penn State*		LECOM Harborcenter • Buffalo, NY (Quarterfinal Game)	Terra Lanteigne	L 1-4	12–18–5
*Non-conference game. ^{#}Rankings from USCHO.com Poll.
