= 2018–19 Mercyhurst Lakers women's ice hockey season =

- Conference: 2nd College Hockey America
- Home ice: Mercyhurst Ice Center

Record
- Overall: 15–14–5
- Conference: 12–6–2
- Home: 9–6–3
- Road: 6–7–2
- Neutral: 0–1–0

Coaches and captains
- Head coach: Michael Sisti (20th season)
- Assistant coaches: Beth Hanrahan; Kelley Steadman
- Captain: Morgan Stacey
- Alternate captain(s): Maggie Knott; Sarah McDonnell; Vilma Tanskanen

The Mercyhurst Lakers represented Mercyhurst University in CHA women's ice hockey during the 2018-19 NCAA Division I women's ice hockey season.

== Offseason ==
Kennedy Blair was selected to participate in the US National Team's Goalie Development Camp.

== Standings ==
2018–19 College Hockey America standings
	Conference							Overall					
	GP	W	L	T	PTS	GF	GA	GP	W	L	T	GF	GA
Robert Morris†	20	13	4	3	29	61	35	36	16	14	6	92	87
Mercyhurst	20	12	6	2	26	54	46	34	15	14	5	88	96
Syracuse*	20	10	8	2	22	55	54	38	13	22	3	89	126
Penn State	20	6	9	5	17	36	43	36	13	14	9	73	72
RIT	20	8	11	1	17	40	46	35	12	18	5	67	84
Lindenwood	20	3	14	3	9	43	65	33	7	22	4	75	93
Championship: March 8, 2019 † indicates conference regular season champion; * indicates conference tournament champion Rankings: USCHO.com

== Roster ==
=== 2018–19 Lakers ===
No.	Nat.	Player	Class	Pos	Height	DoB	Hometown	Previous team
1		Leah Klassen	Sophomore	G	5' 4" (1.63 m)		Niagara-on-the-Lake, Ontario	Westminster School
2		Samantha Fieseler	Senior (RS)	D	5' 6" (1.68 m)		Kelowna, British Columbia	Pursuit of Excellence Academy
4		Maggie Knott (A)	Junior	F	5' 11" (1.8 m)		Smith Falls, Ontario	Ottawa Jr. Lady Senators
5		Sam Isbell	Junior	F	5' 7" (1.7 m)		Thunder Bay, Ontario	Whitby Jr. Wolves
6		K.K Thiessen	Sophomore	D	5' 8" (1.73 m)		Winnipeg, Manitoba	Team Manitoba
7		Summer-Rae Dobson	Sophomore	F	5' 5" (1.65 m)		Huntsville, Ontario	Ridley Tigers
8		Molly Blasen	Senior	D	5' 7" (1.7 m)		Okemos, Michigan	Honeybaked
9		Mary Katherine Gialames	Freshman	D	5' 7" (1.7 m)		Pittsburgh, Pennsylvania	Pittsburgh Penguins Elite
10		Alexa Vasko	Sophomore	F	5' 5" (1.65 m)		St. Catharines, Ontario	Stoney Creek Sabres
11		Sarah Nelles	Freshman	F	5' 6" (1.68 m)		St. Anns, Ontario	Stoney Creek Sabres
12		Megan Korzack	Sophomore	F	5' 2" (1.57 m)		Grimsby, Ontario	Stoney Creek Sabres
13		Claire Werynski	Junior	D	5' 7" (1.7 m)		Williamsville, New York	Gilmour Academy
14		Vilma Tanskanen (A)	Senior	F	5' 9" (1.75 m)		Vantaa, Finland	Finnish National Team
15		Rachel Marmen	Sophomore	D	5' 5" (1.65 m)		Oakville, Ontario	LStoney Creek Sabres
16		Michele Robillard	Junior	F	5' 7" (1.7 m)		Orchard Park, New York	Nichols School
19		Emily Pinto	Freshman	F	5' 3" (1.6 m)		Mississauga, Ontario	Durham West Lightning
20		Emma Nuutinen	Junior	F	5' 9" (1.75 m)		Vantaa, Finland	Finnish National Team
21		Alexane Rheaume	Freshman	D	5' 6" (1.68 m)		Sherbrooke, Quebec	Champlain Cougars
22		Nicole Collier	Senior	D	5' 6" (1.68 m)		Oakville, Ontario	Stoney Creek Sabres
23		Morgan Stacey (C)	Senior	F	5' 5" (1.65 m)		Commerce Township, Michigan	Honeybaked
24		Celine Frappier	Junior	F	5' 4" (1.63 m)		Tecumseh, Ontario	Toronto Jr. Aeros
26		Sarah Hine	Senior	F	5' 4" (1.63 m)		Hamilton, Ontario	Stoney Creek Sabres
29		Kennedy Blair	Sophomore (RS)	G	5' 6" (1.68 m)		Bismarck, North Dakota	Minnesota Revolution
30		Sarah McDonnell (A)	Senior	G	5' 5" (1.65 m)		Oakville, Ontario	Stoney Creek Sabres
34		Liliane Perreault	Freshman	F	5' 7" (1.7 m)		Hinsdale, Illinois	Chicago Mission

== Schedule ==
Date	Opponent^{#}	Rank^{#}	Site	Decision	Result	Record
Regular Season
September 28	at #3 Minnesota*	#10	Ridder Arena • Minneapolis, MN	Kennedy Blair	L 2–4	0–1–0
September 29	at #3 Minnesota*	#10	Ridder Arena • Minneapolis, MN	Kennedy Blair	L 0–5	0–2–0
October 5	#2 Wisconsin*		Mercyhurst Ice Center • Erie, PA	Kennedy Blair	L 1–6	0–3–0
October 6	#2 Wisconsin*		Mercyhurst Ice Center • Erie, PA	Leah Klassen	L 3–5	0–4–0
October 12	at Syracuse		Tennity Ice Skating Pavilion • Syracuse, NY	Sarah McDonnell	W 4–2	1–4–0 (1–0–0)
October 13	at Syracuse		Tennity Ice Skating Pavilion • Syracuse, NY	Sarah McDonnell	W 1–0	2–4–0 (2–0–0)
October 19	Robert Morris		Mercyhurst Ice Center • Erie, PA	Sarah McDonnell	W 4–2	3–4–0 (3–0–0)
October 20	Robert Morris		Mercyhurst Ice Center • Erie, PA	Sarah McDonnell	L 1–5	3–5–0 (3–1–0)
October 26	Penn State		Mercyhurst Ice Center • Erie, PA	Sarah McDonnell	W 2–1	4–5–0 (4–1–0)
October 27	Penn State		Mercyhurst Ice Center • Erie, PA	Sarah McDonnell	W 5–4 ^{OT}	5–5–0 (5–1–0)
November 3	at Lindenwood		Lindenwood Ice Arena • Wentzville, MO	Sarah McDonnell	L 1–4	5–6–0 (5–2–0)
November 4	at Lindenwood		Lindenwood Ice Arena • Wentzville, MO	Sarah McDonnell	W 5–0	6–6–0 (6–2–0)
November 10	#7 Cornell*		Mercyhurst Ice Center • Erie, PA	Kennedy Blair	T 4–4 ^{OT}	6–6–1
November 11	#7 Cornell*		Mercyhurst Ice Center • Erie, PA	Sarah McDonnell	T 0–0 ^{OT}	6–6–2
November 26	at Union*		Achilles Center • Schenectady, NY	Sarah McDonnell	W 5–2	7–6–2
December 7	Bemidji State*		Mercyhurst Ice Center • Erie, PA	Sarah McDonnell	W 3–0	8–6–2
December 8	Bemidji State*		Mercyhurst Ice Center • Erie, PA	Sarah McDonnell	L 1–3	8–7–2
December 15	at Ohio State*		OSU Ice Rink • Columbus, OH (8)	Kennedy Blair	L 1–2 ^{OT}	8–8–2
December 16	at #8 Ohio State*		OSU Ice Rink • Columbus, OH	Kennedy Blair	L 2–9	8–9–2
January 5, 2019	#9 Colgate*		Mercyhurst Ice Center • Erie, PA	Kennedy Blair	T 1–1 ^{OT}	8–9–3
January 6	#9 Colgate*		Mercyhurst Ice Center • Erie, PA	Kennedy Blair	W 8–5	9–9–3
January 18	at RIT		Gene Polisseni Center • Rochester, NY	Kennedy Blair	L 2–4	9–10–3 (6–3–0)
January 25	at Lindenwood		Mercyhurst Ice Center • Erie, PA	Sarah McDonnell	W 2–0	10–10–3 (7–3–0)
January 26	at Lindenwood		Mercyhurst Ice Center • Erie, PA	Kennedy Blair	W 4–2	11–10–3 (8–3–0)
February 2	at RIT		Gene Polisseni Center • Rochester, NY	Sarah McDonnell	L 3–2 ^{OT}	12–10–3 (9–3–0)
February 8	Syracuse		Mercyhurst Ice Center • Erie, PA	Kennedy Blair	L 5–6	12–11–3 (9–4–0)
February 9	Syracuse		Mercyhurst Ice Center • Erie, PA	Kennedy Blair	L 0–4	12–12–3 (9–5–0)
February 15	at Penn State		Pegula Ice Arena • University Park, PA	Kennedy Blair	T 1–1 ^{OT}	12–12–4 (9–5–1)
February 16	at Penn State		Pegula Ice Arena • University Park, PA	Kennedy Blair	T 2–2 ^{OT}	12–12–5 (9–5–2)
February 22	at Robert Morris		Colonials Arena • Neville Township, PA	Kennedy Blair	W 5–2	13–12–5 (10–5–2)
February 23	at Robert Morris		Colonials Arena • Neville Township, PA	Kennedy Blair	L 1–4	13–13–5 (10–6–2)
March 1	RIT		Mercyhurst Ice Center • Erie, PA	Kennedy Blair	W 4–0	14–13–5 (11–6–2)
March 2	RIT		Mercyhurst Ice Center • Erie, PA	Sarah McDonnell	W 2–1	15–13–5 (12–6–2)
CHA Tournament
March 7	vs. Syracuse*		HarborCenter • Buffalo, NY (Semifinal Game)	Kennedy Blair	L 3–4	15–14–5
*Non-conference game. ^{#}Rankings from USCHO.com Poll.

== Awards and honors ==
Sarah Hine was named the CHA /best Defensive Forward. Emma Nuutinen was selected for the CHA All-Conference First Team.
