= 2018–19 Penn State Nittany Lions women's ice hockey season =

- Conference: 4th College Hockey America
- Home ice: Pegula Ice Arena

Record
- Overall: 13-14-9
- Conference: 6-9-5
- Home: 5-5-5
- Road: 7-8-4
- Neutral: 1-1-0

Coaches and captains
- Head coach: Jeff Kampersal (2nd season)
- Assistant coaches: Allison Coomey; Celeste Brown
- Captain: Kelsey Crow
- Alternate captain(s): Brooke Madsen, Natalie Heising

The Penn State Nittany Lions women represented Penn State University in CHA women's ice hockey during the 2017-18 NCAA Division I women's ice hockey season.

== Standings ==
2018–19 College Hockey America standings
	Conference							Overall					
	GP	W	L	T	PTS	GF	GA	GP	W	L	T	GF	GA
Robert Morris†	20	13	4	3	29	61	35	36	16	14	6	92	87
Mercyhurst	20	12	6	2	26	54	46	34	15	14	5	88	96
Syracuse*	20	10	8	2	22	55	54	38	13	22	3	89	126
Penn State	20	6	9	5	17	36	43	36	13	14	9	73	72
RIT	20	8	11	1	17	40	46	35	12	18	5	67	84
Lindenwood	20	3	14	3	9	43	65	33	7	22	4	75	93
Championship: March 8, 2019 † indicates conference regular season champion; * indicates conference tournament champion Rankings: USCHO.com

== Roster ==
=== 2018–19 Nittany Lions ===
No.	Nat.	Player	Class	Pos	Height	DoB	Hometown	Previous team
2		Shea Nelson	Sophomore	F	5' 8" (1.73 m)		Evanston, Illinois	Chicago Mission
5		Brooke Madsen (A)	Junior	D	5' 5" (1.65 m)		Eagan, Minnesota	Team USA U18
7		Kelsey Crow (C)	Senior	D	5' 5" (1.65 m)		Minnetonka, Minnesota	Minnetonka HS
8		Christi Vetter	Senior (RS)	F	5' 11" (1.8 m)		Lakeville, Minnesota	Lakeville North HS
9		Morgan Rolph	Sophomore	D	5' 11" (1.8 m)		Mitchell, Ontario	Kitchener-Waterloo Rangers
10		Abby Welch	Junior	F	5' 7" (1.7 m)		East Amherst, New York	Nichols School
12		Loli Fidler	Freshman	F	5' 9" (1.75 m)		Edina, Minnesota	Edina HS
13		Rene Gangarosa	Freshman	D	5' 10" (1.78 m)		Rochester, New York	Niagara Jr. Purple Eagles
15		Jessica Adolfsson	Freshman	D	5' 9" (1.75 m)		Linköping, Sweden	Swedish National Team
16		Katie McMillan	Junior	F/D	5' 4" (1.63 m)		Minnetonka, Minnesota	Minnetonka HS
17		Sophie Slattery	Sophomore	F	5' 7" (1.7 m)		Edina, Minnesota	Edina HS
18		Amy Dobson	Freshman	D	5' 6" (1.68 m)		Hamilton, Ontario	Oakville Jr. Hornets
19		Katie Rankin	Sophomore	F	5' 9" (1.75 m)		Kanata, Ontario	Nepean Jr. Wildcats
20		Natalie Heising (A)	Sophomore	F	5' 5" (1.65 m)		Maple Grove, Minnesota	Wayzata HS
21		Anna Promersberger	Freshman	F	5' 8" (1.73 m)		Fargo, North Dakota	Shattuck-St. Mary's
22		Olivia Villani	Junior	D	5' 10" (1.78 m)		Pittsburgh, Pennsylvania	East Coast Wizards
23		Kate Rydland	Junior	D	5' 9" (1.75 m)		Eden Prairie, Minnesota	Eden Prairie HS
25		Amanda McLeod	Junior	F	5' 7" (1.7 m)		Calgary, Alberta	Edge School
26		Meike Meilleur	Senior	F	5' 10" (1.78 m)		Marquette, Manitoba	Team Manitoba
27		Izzy Heminger	Freshman	D	5' 4" (1.63 m)		Dublin, Ohio	Ohio AAA Blue Jackets
28		Caileah Forrest	Junior	D	5' 11" (1.8 m)		Ottawa, Ontario	Nepean Jr. Wildcats (WCHA)
32		Cam Leonard	Freshman (RS)	G	5' 7" (1.7 m)		Cary, North Carolina	Choate-Rosemary Hall
33		Chantal Burke	Sophomore	G	5' 9" (1.75 m)		Saskatoon, Saskatchewan	Regina Rebels
35		Jenna Brenneman	Junior	G	5' 7" (1.7 m)		Eagan, Minnesota	Clarkson

== Schedule ==
Date	Opponent^{#}	Rank^{#}	Site	Decision	Result	Record
Regular Season
September 28	at #5 Colgate*		Class of 1965 Arena • Hamilton, NY	Jenna Brenneman	L 1–3	0–1–0
September 29	at #5 Colgate*		Class of 1965 Arena • Hamilton, NY	Jenna Brenneman	W 4–2	1–1–0
October 5	Merrimack*		Pegula Ice Arena • University Park, PA	Jenna Brenneman	T 1–1 ^{OT}	1–1–1
October 6	Merrimack*		Pegula Ice Arena • University Park, PA	Jenna Brenneman	L 1–2	1–2–1
October 12	at Union*		Achilles Center • Schenectady, NY	Jenna Brenneman	W 3–1	2–2–1
October 13	at Union*		Achilles Center • Schenectady, NY	Jenna Brenneman	W 3–2	3–2–1
October 19	Providence*		Pegula Ice Arena • University Park, PA	Jenna Brenneman	L 2–3 ^{OT}	3–3–1
October 20	Providence*		Pegula Ice Arena • University Park, PA	Jenna Brenneman	W 5–3	4–3–1
October 26	at Mercyhurst		Mercyhurst Ice Center • Erie, PA	Jenna Brenneman	L 1–2	4–4–1 (0–1–0)
October 27	at Mercyhurst		Mercyhurst Ice Center • Erie, PA	Chantal Burke	L 4–5 ^{OT}	4–5–1 (0–2–0)
November 3	Syracuse		Pegula Ice Arena • University Park, PA	Jenna Brenneman	L 0–1	4–6–1 (0–3–0)
November 4	Syracuse		Pegula Ice Arena • University Park, PA	Jenna Brenneman	L 2–5	4–7–1 (0–4–0)
November 16	at Rensselaer*		Houston Field House • Troy, NY	Jenna Brenneman	W 4–0	5–7–1
November 17	at Rensselaer*		Houston Field House • Troy, NY	Jenna Brenneman	T 1–1 ^{OT}	5–7–2
November 20	RIT		Pegula Ice Arena • University Park, PA	Jenna Brenneman	W 3–0	6–7–2 (1–4–0)
November 21	RIT		Pegula Ice Arena • University Park, PA	Jenna Brenneman	W 2–1	7–7–2 (2–4–0)
November 30	at Robert Morris		Colonials Arena • Neville Township, PA	Jenna Brenneman	L 2–3	7–8–2 (2–5–0)
December 1	at Robert Morris		Colonials Arena • Neville Township, PA	Jenna Brenneman	L 1–4	7–9–2 (2–6–0)
December 30	at Boston University*		Walter Brown Arena • Boston, MA	Jenna Brenneman	T 1–1 ^{OT}	7–9–3
December 31	at Boston University*		Walter Brown Arena • Boston, MA	Jenna Brenneman	W 1–0	8–9–3
January 8, 2019	#4 Cornell*		Pegula Ice Arena • University Park, PA	Jenna Brenneman	T 3–3 ^{OT}	8–9–4
January 20	Lindenwood		Pegula Ice Arena • University Park, PA	Jenna Brenneman	W 3–0	9–9–4 (3–6–0)
January 21	Lindenwood		Pegula Ice Arena • University Park, PA	Jenna Brenneman	W 2–1	10–9–4 (4–6–0)
January 25	Syracuse		Tennity Ice Skating Pavilion • Syracuse, NY	Jenna Brenneman	L 1–2	10–10–4 (4–7–0)
January 26	Syracuse		Tennity Ice Skating Pavilion • Syracuse, NY	Jenna Brenneman	T 1–1 ^{OT}	10–10–5 (4–7–1)
January 29	at #4 Princeton*		Hobey Baker Memorial Rink • Princeton, NJ	Jenna Brenneman	L 2–4	10–11–5
February 8	Robert Morris		Pegula Ice Arena • University Park, PA	Jenna Brenneman	L 1–5	10–12–5 (4–8–1)
February 9	Robert Morris		Pegula Ice Arena • University Park, PA	Jenna Brenneman	T 2-2 ^{OT}	10–12–6 (4–8–2)
February 15	Mercyhurst		Pegula Ice Arena • University Park, PA	Jenna Brenneman	T 1–1 ^{OT}	10–12–7 (4–8–3)
February 16	Mercyhurst		Pegula Ice Arena • University Park, PA	Cam Leonard	T 2-2 ^{OT}	10–12–8 (4–8–4)
February 22	at RIT		Gene Polisseni Center • Rochester, NY	Cam Leonard	L 0-3	10–13–8 (4–9–4)
February 23	at RIT		Gene Polisseni Center • Rochester, NY	Jenna Brenneman	W 2-1	11–13–8 (5–9–4)
March 1	at Lindenwood		Lindenwood Ice Arena • Wentzville, MO	Jenna Brenneman	W 3-1	12–13–8 (6–9–4)
March 2	at Lindenwood		Lindenwood Ice Arena • Wentzville, MO	Jenna Brenneman	T 3-3 ^{OT}	12–13–9 (6–9–5)
CHA Tournament
March 6	vs. RIT*		LECOM Harborcenter • Buffalo, NY (Quarterfinal Game)	Jenna Brenneman	W 4-1	13–13–9
March 2	vs. #9 Robert Morris*		LECOM Harborcenter • Buffalo, NY (Semifinal Game)	Jenna Brenneman	L 1-2	13–14–9
*Non-conference game. ^{#}Rankings from USCHO.com Poll.
