= 2018–19 Robert Morris Colonials women's ice hockey season =

CHA Regular Season Champions
- Conference: 1st College Hockey America
- Home ice: Colonials Arena

Record
- Overall: 16–14–6
- Conference: 13–4–3
- Home: 10–6–4
- Road: 5–7–2
- Neutral: 1–1–0

Coaches and captains
- Head coach: Paul Colontino (8th season)
- Assistant coaches: Logan Bittle; Chelsea Walkland
- Captain(s): Maggie LaGue; Amber Rennie; Kirsten Welsh
- Alternate captain: Jaycee Gephard

The Robert Morris Colonials women represented Robert Morris University in CHA women's ice hockey during the 2018-19 NCAA Division I women's ice hockey season. The Colonials won their third consecutive regular season title, but lost in the CHA Tournament Championship 6-2 to the Syracuse Orange.

== Offseason ==
- 4/4: Jaycee Gephard was named to the 22-player roster of the Canadian National Women's Development Team.

=== Recruiting ===
Player	Position	Nationality	Notes
Courtney Kollman	Forward	Canada	Edge School graduate
Mackenzie Krasowski	Forward	Canada	Played for Toronto Jr. Aeros
Leah Marino	Forward	United States	Attended North American Hockey Academy
Wasyn Rice	Defense	Canada	Named to Team British Clmbia U-18
Gillian Thompson	Defense	Canada	Teammate of Mackenzie Krasowski on Toronto Jr. Aeros.
Arielle Desmet	Goaltender	United States	Notched 7 shutouts with NAHA in '17-18

== Standings ==
2018–19 College Hockey America standings
	Conference							Overall					
	GP	W	L	T	PTS	GF	GA	GP	W	L	T	GF	GA
Robert Morris†	20	13	4	3	29	61	35	36	16	14	6	92	87
Mercyhurst	20	12	6	2	26	54	46	34	15	14	5	88	96
Syracuse*	20	10	8	2	22	55	54	38	13	22	3	89	126
Penn State	20	6	9	5	17	36	43	36	13	14	9	73	72
RIT	20	8	11	1	17	40	46	35	12	18	5	67	84
Lindenwood	20	3	14	3	9	43	65	33	7	22	4	75	93
Championship: March 8, 2019 † indicates conference regular season champion; * indicates conference tournament champion Rankings: USCHO.com

== Roster ==
=== 2018–19 Colonials ===
No.	Nat.	Player	Class	Pos	Height	DoB	Hometown	Previous team
3		Gillian Thompson	Freshman	D	5' 9" (1.75 m)		Toronto, Ontario	Toronto Jr. Aeros
4		Kirsten Welsh (C)	Senior	D	5' 11" (1.8 m)		Blackstock, Ontario	Whitby Jr. Wolves
5		Emily Curlett	Sophomore	D	5' 5" (1.65 m)		Lapeer, Michigan	Little Caesars U19
6		Janey Sandoval	Sophomore	F	5' 5" (1.65 m)		West Fargo, North Dakota	Minnesota Revolution
7		Wasyn Rice	Freshman	D	5' 7" (1.7 m)		Invermere, British Columbia	Ontario Hockey Academy
8		Sarah Quaranta	Senior	F	5' 6" (1.68 m)		Niagara Falls, Ontario	Stoney Creek Jr. Sabres
9		Maggie LaGue (C)	Senior	D	5' 8" (1.73 m)		Barre, Vermont	North American Hockey Academy
10		Lexi Templeman	Sophomore	F	5' 2" (1.57 m)		Staffa, Ontario	Kitchener Waterloo Rangers
11		Alison Rodgers	Sophomore	F	5' 8" (1.73 m)		Oswego, New York	Minnesota Duluth
12		Leah Marino	Freshman	F	5' 9" (1.75 m)		South Lake Tahoe, California	North American Hockey Academy
14		Courtney Kollman	Freshman	F	5' 4" (1.63 m)		Calgary, Alberta	Edge School
15		Sarah Lecavalier	Junior	F	5' 4" (1.63 m)		Strathmore, Alberta	U North Dakota
17		Jaycee Gephard (A)	Junior	F	5' 3" (1.6 m)		Plenty, Saskatchewan	Team Canada U18
18		Mackenzie Krasowski	Freshman	F	5' 8" (1.73 m)		Keswick, Ontario	Toronto Jr. Aeros
20		Caitlyn Sadowy	Senior	F	5' 6" (1.68 m)		Woodbridge, Ontario	Mississauga Jr. Chiefs
22		Emilie Harley	Sophomore	F	6' 0" (1.83 m)		Syracuse, New York	Ontario Hockey Academy
23		Amber Rennie (C)	Senior	F	5' 3" (1.6 m)		Saskatoon, Saskatchewan	Notre Dame Hounds
24		Anjelica Diffendal	Sophomore	F	6' 0" (1.83 m)		Pittsburgh, Pennsylvania	Pittsburgh Penguins Elite
27		Natalie Marcuzzi	Junior	F	5' 7" (1.7 m)		Thornhill, Ontario	Mississauga Jr. Chiefs
29		Lauren Bailey	Senior	G	5' 9" (1.75 m)		Freeland, Michigan	Choate-Rosemary Hall
30		Molly Singewald	Sophomore	G	5' 4" (1.63 m)		Farmington, Minnesota	Culver Prep
35		Arielle Desmet	Freshman	G	5' 4" (1.63 m)		Charlotte, Vermont	North American Hockey Academy

== 2018-19 schedule ==
Date	Opponent^{#}	Rank^{#}	Site	Decision	Result	Record
Regular Season
September 28	St. Lawrence*		Colonials Arena • Neville Township, PA	Lauren Bailey	L 0-2	0–1–0
September 29	St. Lawrence*		Colonials Arena • Neville Township, PA	Lauren Bailey	W 3-2 ^{OT}	1–1–0
October 5	at #1 Clarkson*		Cheel Arena • Potsdam, NY	Lauren Bailey	L 2-4	1–2–0
October 6	at #1 Clarkson*		Cheel Arena • Potsdam, NY	Lauren Bailey	L 3-4	1–3–0
October 12	Rensselaer*		Colonials Arena • Neville Township, PA	Lauren Bailey	L 0-1	1–4–0
October 13	Rensselaer*		Colonials Arena • Neville Township, PA	Arielle DeSmet	W 3-1	2–4–0
October 19	at Mercyhurst		Mercyhurst Ice Center • Erie, PA	Lauren Bailey	L 2-4	2–5–0 (0–1–0)
October 20	at Mercyhurst		Mercyhurst Ice Center • Erie, PA	Lauren Bailey	W 5-1	3–5–0 (1–1–0)
October 26	Lindenwood		Colonials Arena • Neville Township, PA	Lauren Bailey	T 2-2 ^{OT}	3–5–1 (1–1–1)
October 27	Lindenwood		Colonials Arena • Neville Township, PA	Lauren Bailey	W 2-0	4–5–1 (2–1–1)
November 2	at RIT		Gene Polisseni Center • Rochester, NY	Lauren Bailey	W 3-1	5–5–1 (3–1–1)
November 3	at RIT		Gene Polisseni Center • Rochester, NY	Lauren Bailey	W 3-0	6–5–1 (4–1–1)
November 9	#10 Colgate*		Colonials Arena • Neville Township, PA	Lauren Bailey	L 3-4	6–6–1
November 10	#10 Colgate*		Colonials Arena • Neville Township, PA	Arielle DeSmet	T 2-2 ^{OT}	6–6–2
November 16	Minnesota State*		Colonials Arena • Neville Township, PA	Lauren Bailey	T 4-4 ^{OT}	6–6–3
November 17	Minnesota State*		Colonials Arena • Neville Township, PA	Arielle DeSmet	L 1-2	6–7–3
November 23	#7 Cornell*		Colonials Arena • Neville Township, PA	Arielle DeSmet	L 2-5	6–8–3
November 24	#7 Cornell*		Colonials Arena • Neville Township, PA	Lauren Bailey	T 3-3 ^{OT}	6–8–4
November 30	Penn State		Colonials Arena • Neville Township, PA	Lauren Bailey	W 3-2	7–8–4 (5–1–1)
December 1	Penn State		Colonials Arena • Neville Township, PA	Lauren Bailey	W 4-1	8–8–4 (6–1–1)
December 7	at #2 Minnesota*		Ridder Arena • Minneapolis, MN	Lauren Bailey	L 1-6	8–9–4
December 8	at #2 Minnesota*		Ridder Arena • Minneapolis, MN	Lauren Bailey	L 0-5	8–10–4
January 18, 2019	at Syracuse		Tennity Ice Skating Pavilion • Syracuse, NY	Lauren Bailey	L 2-3 ^{OT}	8–11–4 (6–2–1)
January 19	at Syracuse		Tennity Ice Skating Pavilion • Syracuse, NY	Lauren Bailey	W 5-1	9–11–4 (7–2–1)
January 25	RIT		Colonials Arena • Neville Township, PA	Lauren Bailey	W 3-1	10–11–4 (8–2–1)
January 26	RIT		Colonials Arena • Neville Township, PA	Lauren Bailey	W 2-0	11–11–4 (9–2–1)
February 8	at Penn State		Pegula Ice Arena • University Park, PA	Lauren Bailey	W 5-1	12–11–4 (10–2–1)
February 9	at Penn State		Pegula Ice Arena • University Park, PA	Lauren Bailey	T 2-2 ^{OT}	12–11–5 (10–2–2)
February 15	at Lindenwood		Lindenwood Ice Arena • Wentzville, MO	Lauren Bailey	T 2-2 ^{OT}	12–11–6 (10–2–3)
February 16	at Lindenwood		Lindenwood Ice Arena • Wentzville, MO	Lauren Bailey	L 1-6	12–12–6 (10–3–3)
February 22	Mercyhurst		Colonials Arena • Neville Township, PA	Lauren Bailey	L 2-5	12–13–6 (10–4–3)
February 23	Mercyhurst		Colonials Arena • Neville Township, PA	Arielle DeSmet	W 4-1	13–13–6 (11–4–3)
March 1	Syracuse		Colonials Arena • Neville Township, PA	Arielle DeSmet	W 5-0	14–13–6 (12–4–3)
March 2	Syracuse		Colonials Arena • Neville Township, PA	Lauren Bailey	W 4-2	15–13–6 (13–4–3)
CHA Tournament
March 7	vs. Penn State*		LECOM Harborcenter • Buffalo, NY (Semifinal Game)	Arielle DeSmet	W 2–1	16–13–6
March 8	vs. Syracuse*		LECOM Harborcenter • Buffalo, NY (CHA Championship Game)	Arielle DeSmet	L 2–6	16–14–6
*Non-conference game. ^{#}Rankings from USCHO.com Poll.

== Awards and honors ==
- The Colonials earned the CHA Team Sportsmanship Award
- Jaycee Gephard was named to the CHA All-Conference First Team
- Maggie LaGue was named to the CHA All-Conference First Team
- Lexi Templeman was named to the CHA All-Conference Second Team
- Emily Curlett was named to the CHA All-Conference Second Team
