= 2019 CHA women's ice hockey tournament =

2019 College Hockey America women's ice hockey tournament
- Dates: March 6–8, 2019
- Teams: 6
- Finals site: LECOM Harborcenter; Buffalo, New York
- Champions: Syracuse (1st title)
- Winning coach: Paul Flanagan (1st title)
- College Hockey America women's Ice Hockey Tournaments

The 2019 College Hockey America Women's Ice Hockey Tournament was the 17th tournament in league history played between March 6 and March 8, 2019, at the LECOM Harborcenter in Buffalo, New York. Syracuse won their first tournament and earned College Hockey America's automatic bid into the 2019 NCAA National Collegiate Women's Ice Hockey Tournament

== Format ==
All six CHA Teams participated in the Tournament. On the first day of the Tournament, the top two seeds received a bye, while the #3 seed played the #6 seed, and the #4 seed played the #5 seed in the Quarterfinal round. On the second day, the Semifinal games featured the #1 seed against the lowest remaining seed, while the #2 seed played the highest remaining seed. On the third and final day, the CHA Championship was played between the two Semifinal winners. There was a total of five games.

=== Standings ===
2018–19 College Hockey America standings
	Conference							Overall					
	GP	W	L	T	PTS	GF	GA	GP	W	L	T	GF	GA
Robert Morris†	20	13	4	3	29	61	35	36	16	14	6	92	87
Mercyhurst	20	12	6	2	26	54	46	34	15	14	5	88	96
Syracuse*	20	10	8	2	22	55	54	38	13	22	3	89	126
Penn State	20	6	9	5	17	36	43	36	13	14	9	73	72
RIT	20	8	11	1	17	40	46	35	12	18	5	67	84
Lindenwood	20	3	14	3	9	43	65	33	7	22	4	75	93
Championship: March 8, 2019 † indicates conference regular season champion; * indicates conference tournament champion Rankings: USCHO.com

Round	Match	Name	Team 1		Team 2
1	March 6	Quarterfinal 1 (#3 v. #6)	Syracuse 4	v	Lindenwood 1
2	March 6	Quarterfinal 2 (#4 v. #5)	Penn State 4	v	RIT 1
3	March 7	Semifinal 1 (#1 v. #4)	Robert Morris 2	v	Penn State 1
4	March 7	Semifinal 2 (#2 v. #3)	Mercyhurst 3	v	Syracuse 4
5	March 8	Championship Game	Robert Morris 2	v	Syracuse 6

Tournament Champion: Syracuse

Note: * denotes overtime period(s)

All five members of the All-Tournament team were from Syracuse. Forward Aonda Hoppner was named the Tournament MVP, while Lauren Bellefontaine and Abby Moloughney rounded out the corps of forwards. Defenders included Lindsey Eastwood, who scored a hat trick in the Semifinal against Mercyhurst, and Jessica DiGirolamo. Ady Cohen was the All-Tournament Goalie with two wins and a .917 Save Percentage.

During the Championship Game, Jaycee Gephard became the Single Season Points Leader (19-32-51) in the Robert Morris Colonials history.

The Tournament Champion earned a berth in the NCAA Tournament to determine the national champion. The Syracuse Orange was the number 8 seed out of 8 in the tournament, and lost to #1 seed Wisconsin 4–0 on March 16, in Madison, Wisconsin
