= 2018–19 Wisconsin Badgers women's ice hockey season =

WCHA Tournament Champions NCAA Frozen Four Champions, 2–0 vs Minnesota
- Conference: WCHA
- Home ice: LaBahn Arena

Record
- Overall: 35–4–2
- Home: 20–1–2
- Road: 11–3–0
- Neutral: 4–0–0

Coaches and captains
- Head coach: Mark Johnson

The Wisconsin Badgers represented the University of Wisconsin in WCHA women's ice hockey during the 2018-19 NCAA Division I women's ice hockey season. Defeating the Minnesota Golden Gophers in the 2019 NCAA National Collegiate Women's Ice Hockey Tournament, it was the fifth national championship in program history and their first national title since 2011. Goaltender Kristen Campbell recorded 27 saves, recording her 11th shutout of the season. Of note, seniors Sophia Shaver and Annie Pankowski scored for the Badgers in the national championship game. During the 2019 postseason, Pankowski amassed 11 goals in seven games. With her goal in the national championship game, a shorthanded marker in the second period, she set a new program record for most shorthanded goals in Badgers history.

== Offseason ==
=== Recruiting ===
Player	Position	Nationality	Notes
Britta Curl	Forward	United States	Competed with the Bismarck Blizzard in North Dakota, winning four state championships
Jessie DeVito	Forward	United States	Captain of the Mid-Fairfield Connecticut Stars
Cami Kronish	Goaltender	United States	Won JWHL Goaltender of the Year and first-team all-star honors as a member of the North American Hockey Academy
Nicole Lamantia	Defense	United States	Played for the Chicago Mission
Sophie Shirley	Forward	Canada	Competed for the Calgary Inferno

== Regular season ==
=== Standings ===
2018–19 Western Collegiate Hockey Association standings
	Conference								Overall					
	GP	W	L	T	SW	PTS	GF	GA	GP	W	L	T	GF	GA
#2 Minnesota†	24	19	4	1	0	58	95	48	39	32	6	1	160	69
#1 Wisconsin*	24	18	4	2	0	56	78	26	41	35	4	2	155	43
#9 Ohio State	24	12	10	2	2	40	57	58	35	20	13	2	95	82
Minnesota Duluth	35	24	9	11	4	35	63	69	35	15	16	4	92	99
Bemidji State	24	10	12	2	0	32	49	67	36	13	21	2	75	103
Minnesota State	24	3	16	5	2	16	41	71	35	9	19	7	64	91
St. Cloud State	24	5	19	0	0	15	38	82	37	10	25	2	66	119
Championship: March 10, 2019 † indicates conference regular season champion; * indicates conference tournament champion Rankings: USCHO.com

=== Schedule ===
Date	Opponent^{#}	Rank^{#}	Site	Decision	Result	Record
Regular Season
September 28	Lindenwood*		LaBahn Arena • Madison, WI	Kristen Campbell	W 3–2	1–0–0
September 29	Lindenwood*		LaBahn Arena • Madison, WI	Kristen Campbell	W 6–0	2–0–0
October 5	at Mercyhurst*		Erie, PA	Kristen Campbell	W 6–1	3–0–0
October 6	at Mercyhurst*		Erie, PA	Kristen Campbell	W 5–3	4–0–0
October 13	Minnesota Duluth		LaBahn Arena • Madison, WI	Kristen Campbell	W 4–2	5–0–0 (1–0–0)
October 14	Minnesota Duluth		LaBahn Arena • Madison, WI	Kristen Campbell	W 3–1	6–0–0 (2–0–0)
October 19	Princeton*		LaBahn Arena • Madison, WI	Kristen Campbell	W 4–3	7–0–0
October 21	Princeton*		LaBahn Arena • Madison, WI	Kristen Campbell	W 3–0	8–0–0
October 27	Minnesota		LaBahn Arena • Madison, WI	Alex Gulstene	L 0–1	8–1–0 (2–1–0)
*Non-conference game. ^{#}Rankings from USCHO.com Poll.

== Home attendance ==
Wisconsin led all NCAA Division I women's ice hockey programs in both average and total home attendance, averaging 2,232 spectators and totaling 51,347 spectators. This was the third consecutive season in which Wisconsin led in these attendance metrics.

== Roster ==
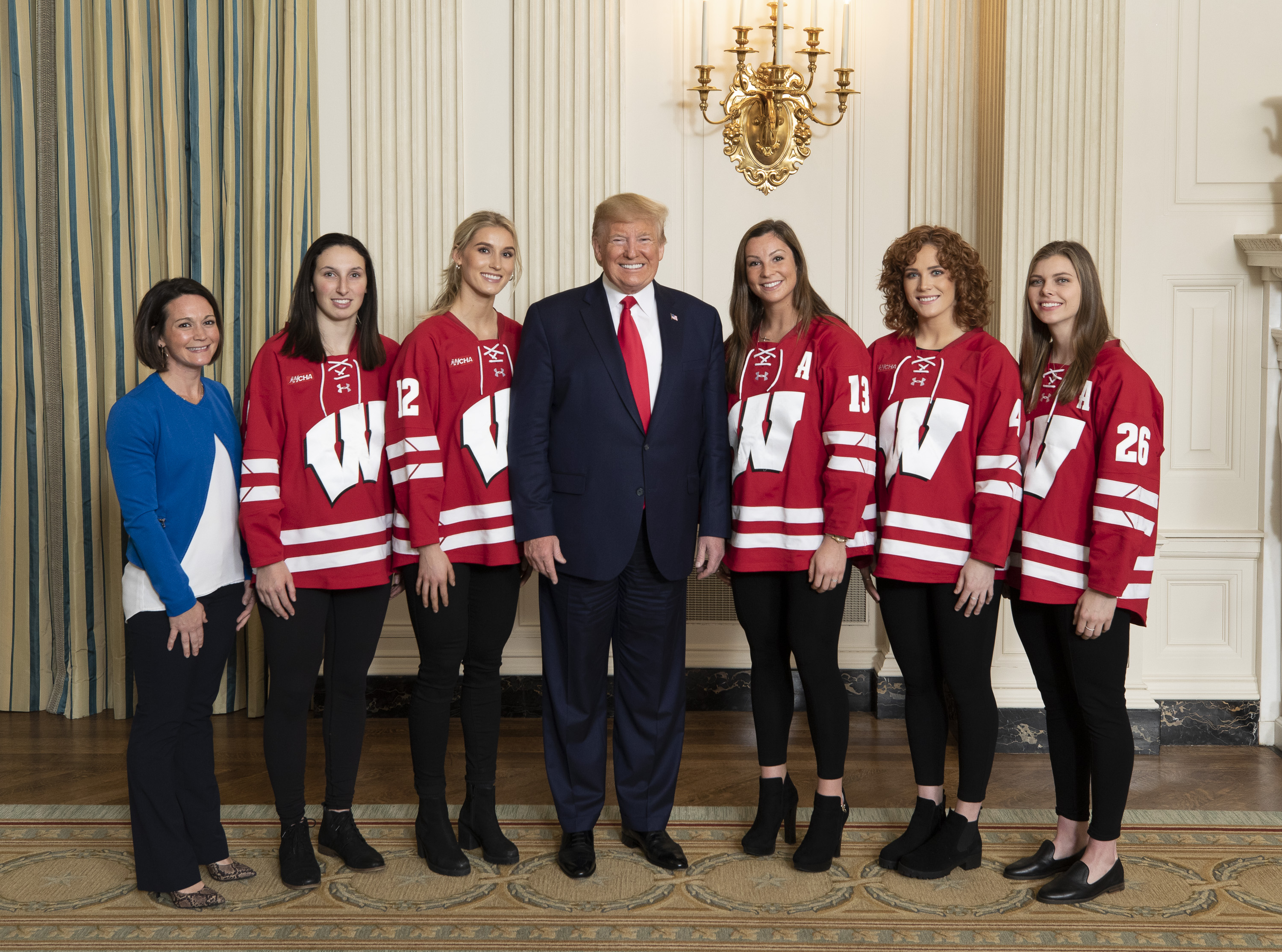
Five of the six senior skaters at the White House alongside President Donald Trump, November 2019

=== 2018–19 Badgers ===
No.	Nat.	Player	Class	Pos	Height	DoB	Hometown	Previous team
2		Natalie Buchbinder	Sophomore	D	5' 8" (1.73 m)		Fairport, New York	Shattuck-St. Mary's
4		Mikaela Gardner	Senior	D	5' 8" (1.73 m)		Plainfield, Illinois	Team USA U18
6		Presley Norby	Junior	F	5' 5" (1.65 m)		Minnetonka, Minnesota	Team USA U18
7		Sam Cogan	Senior	F	5' 8" (1.73 m)		Ottawa, Ontario	Team Canada U18
8		Maddie Rowe	Junior	D	5' 11" (1.8 m)		River Falls, Wisconsin	Minnesota Blades
9		Sophie Shirley	Freshman	F	5' 9" (1.75 m)		Saskatoon, Saskatchewan	Calgary Inferno (CWHL)
10		Delaney Drake	Sophomore	F	5' 7" (1.7 m)		Traverse City, Michigan	North American Hockey Academy
12		Sophia Shaver (A)	Senior	F	5' 10" (1.78 m)		Wayzata, Minnesota	Team USA U18
13		Maddie Rolfes	Senior (RS)	D	5' 8" (1.73 m)		West Des Moines, Iowa	Team USA U18
14		Alexis Mauermann	Junior	F	5' 2" (1.57 m)		Janesville, Wisconsin	Team USA U18
15		Caitlin Schneider	Sophomore	F	5' 4" (1.63 m)		Glenview, Illinois	Chicago Young Americans
18		Abby Roque	Junior	D	5' 7" (1.7 m)		Sault Ste. Marie, Michigan	Team USA U18
19		Annie Pankowski	Senior (RS)	F	5' 9" (1.75 m)		Laguna Hills, California	Irondale HS
20		Brette Pettet	Sophomore	F	5' 3" (1.6 m)		Kentville, Nova Scotia	Team Canada U-18
22		Mekenzie Steffen	Junior	D	5' 6" (1.68 m)		Centerville, Minnesota	Team USA U18
23		Kyleigh Hanzik	Sophomore	F	5' 9" (1.75 m)		Wisconsin Rapids, Wisconsin	North American Hockey Academy
26		Emily Clark	Senior (RS)	F	5' 7" (1.7 m)		Saskatoon, Saskatchewan	Okanagan Hockey Academy
27		Grace Bowlby	Sophomore	F	5' 8" (1.73 m)		Edina, Minnesota	Team USA U-18
29		Nikki Cece	Junior	F	5' 7" (1.7 m)		Oakville, Ontario	Oakville Jr. Hornets
32		Breanna Blesi	Sophomore	G	5' 7" (1.7 m)		Maple Grove, Minnesota	Maple Grove HS
35		Kristen Campbell	Junior (RS)	G	5' 9" (1.75 m)		Brandon, Manitoba	U North Dakota

== Awards and honors ==
- Annie Pankowski, 2018–19 All-America selection (First Team)
- Kristen Campbell, 2018–19 All-America selection (Second Team)

=== WCHA Weekly Awards ===
- Kristen Campbell, WCHA Goaltender of the Week (awarded November 6)
- Kristen Campbell, WCHA Goaltender of the Week (awarded November 20)
- Mekenzie Steffen, WCHA Defensive Player of the Week (awarded November 6)

=== WCHA honors ===
- Annie Pankowski, WCHA Offensive Player of the Year
- Kristen Campbell, WCHA Goaltender of the Year
- Kristen Campbell, WCHA Goaltending Champion (Campbell led WCHA netminders with a 1.08 goals-against average in league play)
- Sophie Shirley, WCHA Rookie of the Year
- Mark Johnson, WCHA Coach of the Year

=== WCHA All-Stars ===
- Kristen Campbell, 2018–19 All-WCHA First Team
- Annie Pankowski, 2018–19 All-WCHA First Team
- Mekenzie Steffen, 2018–19 All-WCHA First Team
- Sophie Shirley, 2018–19 All-WCHA Second Team
- Abby Roque, 2018–19 All-WCHA Second Team
- Maddie Rolfes, 2018–19 All-WCHA Second Team

=== WCHA All-Rookie Team ===
- Britta Curl, Forward
- Sophie Shirley, Forward

=== WCHA 20th Anniversary Team ===
- Ann-Renée Desbiens, Goaltender (2013–17)
