= Jessica DiGirolamo =

Canadian ice hockey player (born 1999)

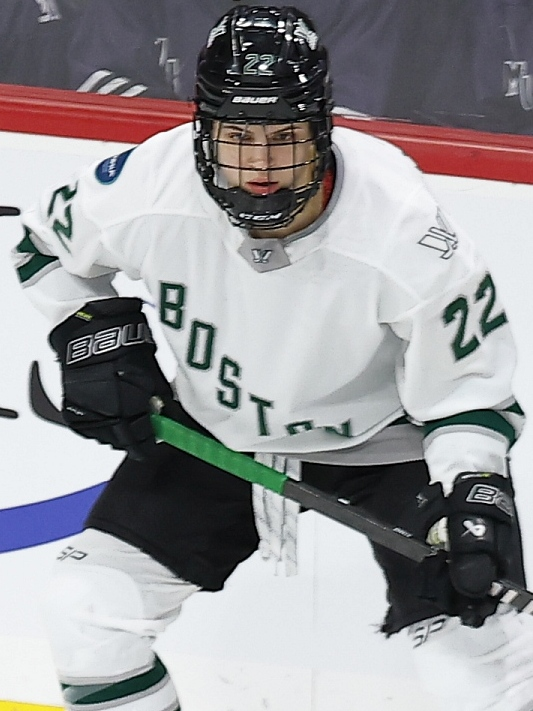
- DiGirolamo with PWHL Boston in 2024
- Born: February 13, 1999 (age 27) Mississauga, Ontario, Canada
- Height: 5 ft 9 in (175 cm)
- Weight: 163 lb (74 kg; 11 st 9 lb)
- Position: Defence
- Shoots: Left
- PWHL team Former teams: Montreal Victoire; Boston Fleet
- Playing career: 2017–present

Jessica DiGirolamo (born February 13, 1999) is a Canadian ice hockey player who is a defender for the Montreal Victoire of the Professional Women's Hockey League (PWHL). She previously played for the Boston Fleet of the PWHL. She played college ice hockey at Syracuse.

== Early life ==
DiGirolamo was born to Salvatore DiGirolamo and Mary Kolic, and has a brother, Matthew. She played ice hockey for the Oakville Jr. Hornets of the Provincial Women's Hockey League for three seasons, and served as assistant captain during her senior year. She attended St. Marcellinus Secondary School where she was a four sport athlete, playing basketball, ice hockey, softball and running track and field.

== College career ==
DiGirolamo began her collegiate career with the Syracuse Orange during the 2017–18 season. During her freshman year, she recorded two goals and 13 assists in 36 games. She led all Orange rookies points with 15. Following the season she was named to the CHA all-rookie team. During the 2018–19 season in her sophomore year, she recorded seven goals and 11 assists in 37 games. She led all Orange defensemen in goals (7) and ranked second in points (18), blocked shots (70) and power-play goals (4). During the 2019 CHA tournament championship game against Robert Morris, she recorded two assists helping Syracuse win its first-ever conference championship and advance to the NCAA tournament for the first time in program history. She was named to the CHA All-Tournament team.

During the 2019–20 season in her junior year, she recorded eight goals and 15 assists in 36 games. Defensively she recorded a team-high 71 blocked shots. During the 2020–21 season in her senior year, she recorded ten goals and ten assists in 22 games, in a season that was shortened due to the COVID-19 pandemic. She recorded her first career hat-trick on February 12, 2021, in a game against Lindenwood. She led the team in goals and ranked second in points (20). In conference play, she tied for the league lead in defenseman scoring with 14 points. Following the season she was named to the All-CHA first team, and named CHA Defenseman of the Year.

During the 2021–22 season, as a graduate student, she recorded six goals and 13 assists in 32 games. During the 2022 CHA tournament championship game against Mercyhurst, she recorded an assist on the game-winning overtime goal, helping Syracuse win its second conference championship. She finished the tournament with three assists and nine blocked shots and was named to CHA All-Tournament team. She was named a four-time CHA Defenseman of the Month, earning the award in October, November, January and February, and was named to the All-CHA first team, and named CHA Defenseman of the Year for the second consecutive season.

She finished her collegiate career as Syracuse's all-time leader in goals (33), assists (62) and points (95) by a defenseman.

== Professional career ==
On September 18, 2023, DiGirolamo was drafted in the sixth round, 34th overall, by PWHL Boston in the 2023 PWHL Draft. On November 8, 2023, she signed a two-year contract with Boston. During the 2023–24 season, she recorded three assists in 24 regular season games. During the 2024–25 season, she recorded one goal and four assists in 30 games. On June 19, 2025, she signed a two-year contract with the Montreal Victoire.

== Career statistics ==
			Regular season					Playoffs
Season	Team	League	GP	G	A	Pts	PIM	GP	G	A	Pts	PIM
2017–18	Syracuse University	CHA	36	2	13	15	30	—	—	—	—	—
2018–19	Syracuse University	CHA	37	7	11	18	18	—	—	—	—	—
2019–20	Syracuse University	CHA	36	8	15	23	14	—	—	—	—	—
2020–21	Syracuse University	CHA	22	10	10	20	16	—	—	—	—	—
2021–22	Syracuse University	CHA	32	6	13	19	26	—	—	—	—	—
2022–23	Team Adidas	PWPHA	20	1	4	5	6	—	—	—	—	—
2023–24	PWHL Boston	PWHL	24	0	3	3	8	8	0	0	0	2
2024–25	Boston Fleet	PWHL	30	1	4	5	12	—	—	—	—	—
2025–26	Montréal Victoire	PWHL	29	1	2	3	10	9	0	1	1	0
PWHL totals			83	2	9	11	30	17	0	1	1	2

== Awards and honours ==
Honours	Year
College
CHA All-Rookie Team	2018
CHA Defenseman of the Year	2021, 2022
All-CHA First Team	2021, 2022
CHA All-Tournament Team	2019, 2021, 2022
PWHL
Walter Cup champion	2026
