= Nicole Schammel =

American ice hockey forward

- Born: April 9, 1996 (age 30) Red Wing, Minnesota, United States
- Height: 165 cm (5 ft 5 in)
- Position: Forward
- Shoots: Left
- PHF team: Minnesota Whitecaps
- Played for: PWHPA; University of Minnesota; Minnesota State University
- Playing career: 2019–present

Nicole Schammel is an American former ice hockey forward who most recently played for the Minnesota Whitecaps of the Premier Hockey Federation (PHF).

== Career ==
Schammel began her university career with Minnesota State University, but after only year there, she decided to transfer to the University of Minnesota. Across 152 NCAA games, she scored 113 points and was named a finalist for the Patty Kazmaier Memorial Award in 2019.

On June 6, 2019, Schammel signed her first professional contract with the Minnesota Whitecaps of the Premier Hockey Federation (PHF). In her first PHF season, Schammel put up 25 points in 22 games, 12th highest in the league. She was named to Team Dempsey for the 2020 NWHL All-Star Game.

In September 2020, she announced that she was joining the Professional Women's Hockey Players Association (PWHPA) for the 2020–21 season. She participated with the Minnesota regional team in the PWHPA's exhibition games against the United States Premier Hockey League's junior Minnesota Mullets, with the PWHPA team winning by scores of 8–1 and 9–3.

On October 7, 2021, Schammel re-signed with the Minnesota Whitecaps.

=== International ===
Schammel participated in the 2012 and 2013 USA Hockey Girls U-18 Select Development Camps, but has yet to play a game for the American national team.

== Career statistics ==
			Regular season					Playoffs
Season	Team	League	GP	G	A	Pts	PIM	GP	G	A	Pts	PIM
2019–20	Minnesota Whitecaps	NWHL	22	11	14	25	6	1	0	0	0	0
2020–21	Independent	PWHPA	—	—	—	—	—	—	—	—	—	—
NWHL totals			22	11	14	25	6	1	0	0	0	0
