= Sophie Shirley =

Canadian ice hockey player (born 1999)

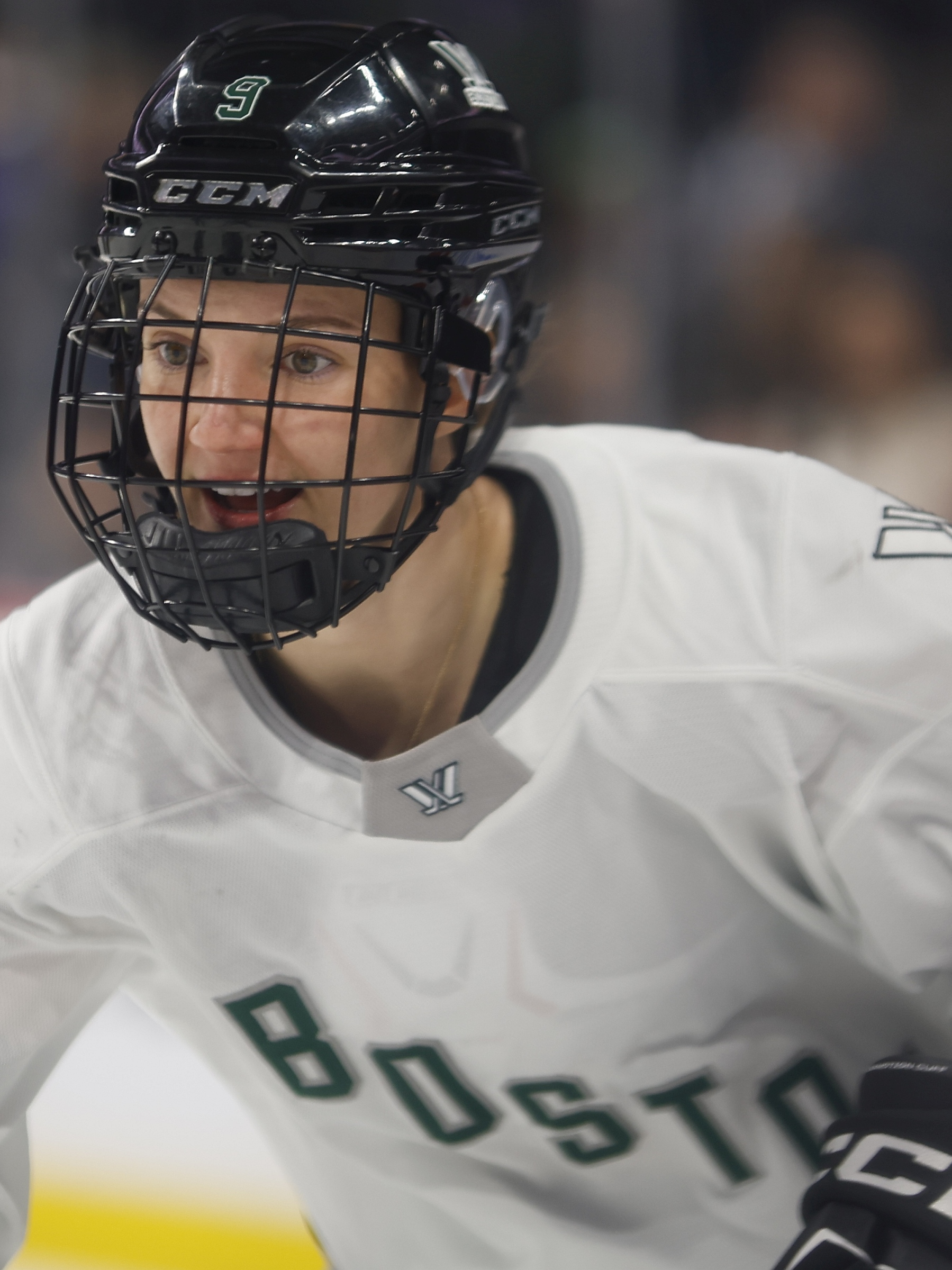
- Shirley with PWHL Boston in 2024
- Born: June 30, 1999 (age 27) Saskatoon, Saskatchewan, Canada
- Height: 5 ft 9 in (175 cm)
- Weight: 140 lb (64 kg; 10 st 0 lb)
- Position: Forward
- Shoots: Right
- PWHL team Former teams: Boston Fleet; Wisconsin Badgers (NCAA); Calgary Inferno (CWHL)
- National team: Canada
- Playing career: 2015–present
Medal record
Women's ice hockey
Representing Canada
World U18 Championship
| Silver medal – second place | 2016 Canada |

Sophie Shirley (born June 30, 1999) is a Canadian professional ice hockey player for the Boston Fleet of the Professional Women's Hockey League (PWHL). She made her debut with the Canadian women's national team in a two-game exhibition series against the United States in December 2016.

== Playing career ==
Shirley was a member of Saskatchewan's women's ice hockey team that competed in the 2015 Canada Winter Games. The team lost the bronze medal game to Manitoba by a score of 2–1 in overtime.

Competing with the Canadian national under-18 team, she captured silver medals at the 2016 and 2017 IIHF World Women's U18 Championships. During the latter tournament, Shirley was named the tournament's best forward after tying for the scoring lead.

Shirley played one season with the Calgary Inferno of the Canadian Women's Hockey League, and was named the league's rookie of the year. She then embarked on a collegiate career with Wisconsin, where she won three NCAA championships and was twice a top-10 finalist for the NCAA's best player award.

In 2023, Shirley turned professional by signing with the Boston Pride of the Premier Hockey Federation (PHF). However, the PHF was purchased that summer as part of the foundation of a new women's league, the Professional Women's Hockey League (PWHL); the PHF folded as part of the process. Shirley then declared for the inaugural PWHL draft. On September 18, 2023, she drafted 63rd overall by PWHL Boston at the 2023 PWHL Draft. The Boston team also features United States national team captain Hilary Knight and Swiss star Alina Müller. In the PWHL's first exhibition game, played between Boston and PWHL Toronto, Shirley scored Boston's first ever goal—Toronto won the game by a score of 5–3. During the 2023–24 season she recorded three goals and two assists in 20 regular season games and one goal and one assist in eight playoff games during the Walter Cup. On June 20, 2024, she signed a two-year contract extension with Boston.

== Awards and honors ==
- 2014 Rookie of the Year Award, Saskatchewan Female Midget AAA League
- 2014 Second Team All-Star, Saskatchewan Female Midget AAA League
- 2014 Saskatoon Stars Team MVP
- Directorate Award, Best Forward, 2017 IIHF World Women's U18 Championship
- 2020-21 All-USCHO.com Third Team
