= 2018–19 NCAA Division I women's ice hockey season =

- NCAA tournament: 2019
- National championship: People's United Center; Hamden, Connecticut
- NCAA champion: Wisconsin
- Patty Kazmaier Award: Loren Gabel (Clarkson)

The 2018–19 NCAA Division I women's ice hockey season began in September 2018 and ended with the 2019 NCAA Division I women's ice hockey tournament's championship game on March 24, 2019.

== Regular season ==
=== Standings ===
2018–19 College Hockey America standings
	Conference							Overall					
	GP	W	L	T	PTS	GF	GA	GP	W	L	T	GF	GA
Robert Morris†	20	13	4	3	29	61	35	36	16	14	6	92	87
Mercyhurst	20	12	6	2	26	54	46	34	15	14	5	88	96
Syracuse*	20	10	8	2	22	55	54	38	13	22	3	89	126
Penn State	20	6	9	5	17	36	43	36	13	14	9	73	72
RIT	20	8	11	1	17	40	46	35	12	18	5	67	84
Lindenwood	20	3	14	3	9	43	65	33	7	22	4	75	93
Championship: March 8, 2019 † indicates conference regular season champion; * indicates conference tournament champion Rankings: USCHO.com

2018–19 ECAC Hockey standings
	Conference							Overall					
	GP	W	L	T	PTS	GF	GA	GP	W	L	T	GF	GA
#4 Cornell†	22	17	3	2	36	75	32	36	24	6	6	114	61
#10 Colgate	22	15	4	3	33	83	49	38	23	10	5	133	96
#3 Clarkson*	22	16	5	1	33	81	36	40	30	8	2	143	73
#7 Princeton	22	15	4	3	33	83	40	33	20	8	5	116	68
St. Lawrence	22	9	7	6	24	51	46	36	14	15	7	76	87
Quinnipiac	22	9	9	4	22	52	40	36	12	18	6	73	73
Harvard	22	9	9	4	22	46	41	32	12	15	5	74	68
RPI	22	10	11	1	21	33	57	37	14	18	5	50	88
Yale	22	7	12	3	17	49	61	29	8	18	3	62	87
Dartmouth	22	4	16	2	10	30	66	29	5	21	3	39	88
Brown	22	2	16	4	8	32	88	29	5	20	4	47	109
Union	22	2	19	1	5	27	86	34	4	28	2	43	129
Championship: March 10, 2019 † indicates conference regular season champion; * indicates conference tournament champion Rankings: USCHO.com

2018–19 Western Collegiate Hockey Association standings
	Conference								Overall					
	GP	W	L	T	SW	PTS	GF	GA	GP	W	L	T	GF	GA
#2 Minnesota†	24	19	4	1	0	58	95	48	39	32	6	1	160	69
#1 Wisconsin*	24	18	4	2	0	56	78	26	41	35	4	2	155	43
#9 Ohio State	24	12	10	2	2	40	57	58	35	20	13	2	95	82
Minnesota Duluth	35	24	9	11	4	35	63	69	35	15	16	4	92	99
Bemidji State	24	10	12	2	0	32	49	67	36	13	21	2	75	103
Minnesota State	24	3	16	5	2	16	41	71	35	9	19	7	64	91
St. Cloud State	24	5	19	0	0	15	38	82	37	10	25	2	66	119
Championship: March 10, 2019 † indicates conference regular season champion; * indicates conference tournament champion Rankings: USCHO.com

2018–19 WHEA standings
	Conference							Overall					
	GP	W	L	T	PTS	GF	GA	GP	W	L	T	GF	GA
#5 Northeastern†*	27	21	3	3	45	98	50	38	27	6	5	131	75
#6 Boston College	27	19	7	1	39	98	53	39	26	12	1	132	78
#8 Boston University	27	15	6	6	36	86	53	37	21	8	8	118	70
Providence	27	16	9	2	34	72	53	37	24	11	2	104	70
Merrimack	27	12	10	5	29	80	64	36	16	13	7	97	77
New Hampshire	27	10	14	3	'23	61	69	36	13	17	6	77	86
Connecticut	27	9	14	4	22	54	74	36	14	18	4	82	96
Vermont	27	8	15	4	20	50	73	36	10	20	6	70	101
Maine	27	7	15	5	19	51	66	34	14	15	5	82	70
Holy Cross	27	1	25	1	3	28	123	33	1	29	3	34	141
Championship: March 10, 2019 † indicates conference regular season champion; * indicates conference tournament champion Rankings: USCHO.com

2018–19 NEWHA standings
	Conference							Overall					
	GP	W	L	T	PTS	GF	GA	GP	W	L	T	GF	GA
St. Anselm†*	16	15	0	1	31	91	19	22	21	0	1	114	21
Sacred Heart	16	9	4	3	21	58	26	26	15	8	3	90	51
Franklin Pierce	16	8	7	1	17	56	34	24	14	9	1	85	49
Saint Michael's	16	4	11	1	9	27	52	22	7	14	1	40	73
Post	16	1	15	0	2	5	106	29	5	24	0	24	169
Championship: March 8, 2018 † indicates conference regular season champion; * indicates conference tournament champion Rankings: USCHO.com

== Player stats ==
=== Scoring leaders ===
The following players lead the NCAA in points at the conclusion of games played on March 23, 2019.

Player	Class	Team	GP	G	A	Pts
Élizabeth Giguère	Sophomore	Clarkson	40	26	47	73
Loren Gabel	Senior	Clarkson	38	40	29	69
Jesse Compher	Sophomore	Boston University	37	17	44	61
Sarah Fillier	Freshman	Princeton	29	22	35	57
Michaela Pejzlová	Junior	Clarkson	40	19	36	55
Jessie Eldridge	Senior	Colgate	38	30	24	54
Sammy Davis	Senior	Boston University	37	25	27	52
Alina Mueller	Freshman	Northeastern	37	21	30	51
Jaycee Gebhard	Junior	Robert Morris	41	15	38	53
Annie Pankowski	Senior	Wisconsin	38	27	22	49

=== Leading goaltenders ===
The following goaltenders lead the NCAA in goals against average.
GP = Games played; Min = Minutes played; W = Wins; L = Losses; T = Ties; GA = Goals against; SO = Shutouts; SV% = Save percentage; GAA = Goals against average

Player	Class	Team	GP	Min	W	L	T	GA	SO	SV%	GAA
Kristen Campbell	Redshirt	Wisconsin	40	2324:51	34	4	2	41	10	.937	1.06
Maddie Scavotto	Senior	Saint Anselm	17	995:14	14	2	1	20	5	.937	1.21
Emme Ostrander	Freshman	Franklin Pierce	21	1219:27	13	6	1	29	8	.938	1.43
Marlene Boissonnault	Senior	Cornell	30	1753:21	20	5	4	48	6	.918	1.64
Alex Gulstene	Sophomore	Minnesota	22	1326:16	20	2	0	37	3	.920	1.67

== Awards ==
=== WCHA ===
Award		Recipient
Player of the Year		Annie Pankowski, Wisconsin
Defensive Player of the Year		Jincy Roese, Ohio State
Rookie of the Year		Sophie Shirley, Wisconsin
Outstanding Student-Athlete of the Year		Corbin Boyd, Minnesota
Scoring Champion		Nicole Schammel, Minnesota; Emma Maltais, Ohio State
Goaltending Champion		Kristen Campbell, Wisconsin
Coach of the Year		Mark Johnson, Wisconsin
All-WCHA Teams
First Team	Position	Second Team
Kristen Campbell, Wisconsin	G	Abigail Levy, Minnesota
Jincy Roese, Ohio State	D	Emily Brown, Minnesota
Mekenzie Steffen, Wisconsin	D	Maddie Rolfes, Wisconsin
Emma Maltais, Ohio State	F	Abby Roque, Wisconsin
Annie Pankowski, Wisconsin	F	Nicole Schammel, Minnesota
Grace Zumwinkle, Minnesota	F	Sophie Shirley, Wisconsin
Third Team	Position	Rookie Team
Lauren Bench, Bemidji State	G	Abigail Levy, Minnesota
Mak Langei, Bemidji State	D	Maggie Flaherty, Minnesota Duluth
Patti Marshall, Minnesota	D	Sophie Jaques, Ohio State
–	D	Anna Wilgren, Minnesota
Gabbie Hughes, Minnesota Duluth	F	Britta Curl, Wisconsin
Kelly Pannek, Minnesota	F	Taylor Heise, Minnesota
Naomi Rogge, Minnesota Duluth	F	Gabbie Hughes, Minnesota Duluth
–	F	Sophie Shirley, Wisconsin

=== CHA ===
Award		Recipient
Player of the Year		Terra Lanteigne, RIT
Rookie of the Year		Lauren Bellefontaine, Syracuse
Defenseman of the Year		Allie Munroe, Syracuse
Defensive Forward of the Year		Sarah Hine, Mercyhurst
Sportsmanship Award		Maggie LaGue, Robert Morris
Coach of the Year		Chad Davis, RIT
CHA All-Conference Teams
First Team	Position	Second Team
Terra Lanteigne, RIT	G	Jenna Brenneman, Penn State
Maggie LaGue, Robert Morris	D	Kelsey Crow, Penn State
Allie Munroe, Syracuse	D	Emily Curlett, Robert Morris
Jaycee Gebhard, Robert Morris	F	Sierra Burt, Lindenwood
Natalie Heising, Penn State	F	Emma Polaski, Syracuse
Emma Nuutinen, Mercyhurst	F	Lexi Templeman, Robert Morris
Rookie Team	Position	–
Sophie Wolf, Lindenwood	G	–
Jessica Adolfsson, Penn State	D	–
Taylor Kirwan, Lindenwood	D	–
Lauren Bellefontaine, Syracuse	F	–
Jada Burke, Lindenwood	F	–
Abby Moloughney, Syracuse	F	–

=== WHEA ===
Award		Recipient
Cami Granato Award (Player of the Year)		Megan Keller, Boston College
Pro Ambitions Rookie of the Year		Alina Müller, Northeastern
Hockey East Coach of the Year		Dave Flint, Northeastern
Best Defensive Forward		Makenna Newkirk, Boston College
Best Defenseman		Megan Keller, Boston College
Sportmanship Award		Marie-Jo Pelletier, New Hampshire
Army ROTC Three Stars Award		Megan Keller, Boston College
Scoring Champion		Jesse Compher, Boston University
Women's Hockey East All-Star Teams
First Team	Position	Second Team
Aerin Frankel, Northeastern	G	Samantha Ridgewell, Merrimack
Skylar Fontaine, Northeastern	D	Abby Cook, Boston University
Megan Keller, Boston College	D	Brooke Hobson, Northeastern
Jesse Compher, Boston University	F	Samantha Davis, Boston University
Alina Müller, Northeastern	F	Maureen Murphy, Providence
Katelyn Rae, Merrimack	F	Daryl Watts, Boston College
Third Team	Position	Rookie Team
Corinne Schroeder, Boston University	G	–
Cayla Barnes, Boston College	D	Cayla Barnes, Boston College
Kali Flanagan, Boston College	D	–
Dominique Kremer, Merrimack	D	–
Kasidy Anderson, Northeastern	F	Chloe Aurard, Northeastern
Caitrin Lonergan, Boston College	F	Kelly Browne, Boston College
Taylor Wenczkowski, New Hampshire	F	Sara Hjalmarsson, Providence
–	F	Alina Müller, Northeastern
–	F	Mackenna Parker, Boston University

=== ECAC ===
Award		Recipient
Player of the Year		Loren Gabel, Clarkson
Best Forward		Loren Gabel, Clarkson
Best Defenseman		Jaime Bourbonnais, Cornell
Rookie of the Year		Sarah Fillier, Princeton
Goaltender of the Year		Lovisa Selander, RPI
Mandi Schwartz Student-Athlete of the Year		Mackenzie Lancaster, Quinnipiac
Coach of the Year		Doug Derraugh, Cornell
All-ECAC Teams
First Team	Position	Second Team
Lovisa Selander, RPI	G	Lindsay Reed, Harvard
Jaime Bourbonnais, Cornell	D	Ella Shelton, Clarkson
Claire Thompson, Princeton	D	Olivia Zafuto, Colgate
Jessie Eldridge, Colgate	F	Maggie Connors, Princeton
Sarah Fillier, Princeton	F	Élizabeth Giguère, Clarkson
Loren Gabel, Clarkson	F	Kristin O'Neill, Cornell
Third Team	Position	Rookie Team
Kassidy Sauvé, Clarkson	G	Lindsay Reed, Harvard
Josiane Pozzebon, Clarkson	D	Tanner Gates, Colgate
Micah Zandee-Hart, Cornell	D	Mariah Keopple, Princeton
Carly Bullock, Princeton	F	Maggie Connors, Princeton
Shae Labbe, Colgate	F	Sarah Fillier, Princeton
Michaela Pejzlová, Clarkson	F	Rebecca Vanstone, Yale

=== Patty Kazmaier Award ===
Patty Kazmaier Award Finalists
Player	Position	School
Loren Gabel	Forward	Clarkson
Megan Keller	Defense	Boston College Top Three
Annie Pankowski	Forward	Wisconsin Top Three
Jesse Compher	Forward	Boston University
Jessie Eldridge	Forward	Colgate
Sarah Fillier	Forward	Princeton
Élizabeth Giguère	Forward	Clarkson
Alina Mueller	Forward	Northeastern
Nicole Schammel	Forward	Minnesota
Lovisa Selander	Goaltender	RPI

=== AHCA Coach of the Year ===
AHCA Coach of the Year Finalists
Coach	School
Doug Derraugh	Cornell
Chad Davis	RIT
Matt Desrosiers	Clarkson
Dave Flint	Northeastern
Brad Frost	Minnesota
Mark Johnson	Wisconsin
Kerstin Matthews	Saint Anselm

=== Women's Hockey Commissioners Association ===
- Grace Harrison: Women's Hockey Commissioners Association Division I Goaltender of the Month for January 2019
