= Syracuse Orange women's ice hockey =

Women's ice hockey team of Syracuse University

- Current season
- University: Syracuse University
- Conference: AHA
- First season: 2008; 18 years ago
- Head coach: Brian Idalski; 1st season, 0–0–0
- Arena: Tennity Ice Skating Pavilion; Syracuse, New York
- Colors: Orange and Navy
- Fight song: Down the Field

NCAA tournament appearances
- 2019, 2022

Conference tournament champions
- 2019, 2022

Conference regular season champions
- 2022

Syracuse Orange women's ice hockey is a college ice hockey program that has represented Syracuse University in National Collegiate Athletic Association (NCAA) Division I and Atlantic Hockey America (AHA). The Orange joined AHA at the conference's creation after the 2023–24 season, when College Hockey America (CHA), the Orange's home since the 2008–09 season, merged with the Atlantic Hockey Association. Syracuse plays its home games at Tennity Ice Skating Pavilion in Syracuse, New York.

== History ==
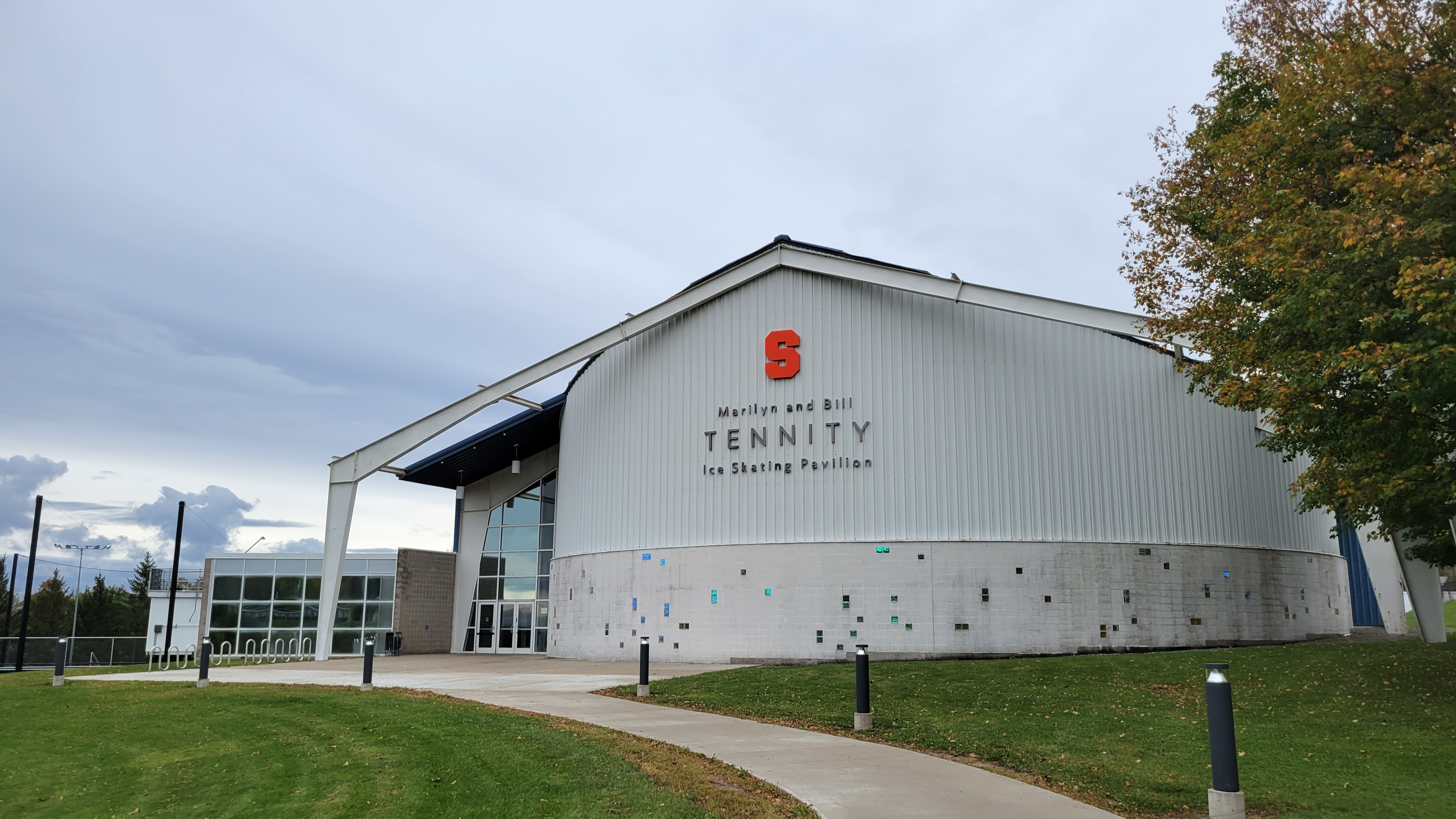
The Tennity Ice Skating Pavilion serves as the home venue for the Syracuse women's ice hockey.

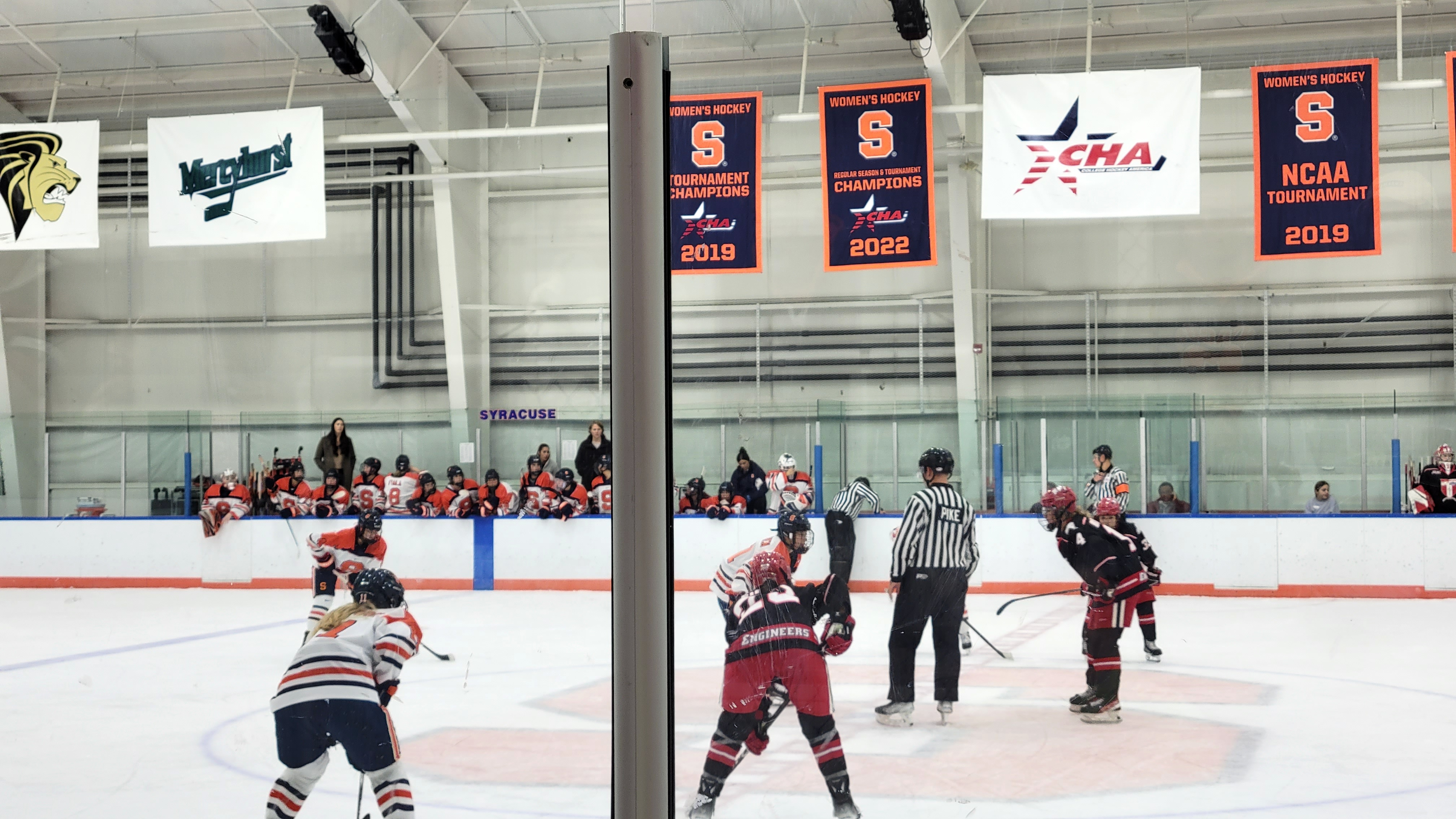
The Orange play against the RPI Engineers women's ice hockey at Tennity Ice Skating Pavilion on October 14, 2023.

=== 2008–09 season ===
On March 6, 2008, it was announced that the Orange would join College Hockey America. Syracuse was the fifth school to join the conference for women's hockey.

Paul Flanagan, who coached the St. Lawrence Skating Saints women's ice hockey program to five NCAA Frozen Four appearances was appointed as the first coach for the Orange women's ice hockey program. Flanagan had been the 2001 ECAC and American Hockey Coaches Association Coach of the Year. For the inaugural season, Flanagan was joined by Graham Thomas, who played for Mannheim Jung Adler in Germany, and Erin O'Brien, a two-time All-American at Plattsburgh State, an NCAA Division III school for women's ice hockey.

Some of the first players for the team were transfer players from other schools. Gabrielle Beaudry, transferred to the Orange from Boston College. Cheyenne Bojeski was a transfer from Mercyhurst, while Julie Rising came to the Orange from Bemidji State. Lucy Schoedel and Stefany Marty were both transfers from New Hampshire.

The Orange's inaugural season was in 2008–09, and the team played its first ever game on Wednesday, October 1, 2008, at Colgate. During the first game Lucy Schoedel recorded 34 saves and Megan Skelly scored the first goal in Syracuse women's ice hockey history nine seconds into the game. Despite holding a 2–0 lead in the game, the Orange lost to Colgate by a score of 3–4. The following two games were against the eventual NCAA champion Wisconsin Badgers on October 2 and 3. Despite losing both games, Lucy Schoedel made seventy five saves in two games. A week later, Syracuse played in its first ever College Hockey America conference game. The Orange took on the Robert Morris Colonials. Lucy Schoedel recorded her 100th career save (and totaling 130 stops in just four games) in a 1–0 losing effort. Team captain Stefanie Marty scored her first goal for Syracuse on October 17. It was a 4–2 loss at Quinnipiac. Of note, Cheyenne Bojeski also scored her first ever goal for Syracuse. The following day, co-captains Julie Rising and Stefanie Marty would both score as Syracuse won its first ever game by a 2–0 tally.

March 5, 2009 was the first postseason game in Orange history. In the quarterfinal round of the College Hockey America tournament, the Orange were ousted by the Niagara Purple Eagles by a score of 3–2. Freshman forward Kylie Klassen made history by scoring the first playoff goal in the program's history. Assists went to Megan Skelly and Julie Rising.

=== 2009–10 season ===
After a slow start to the season, the Orange won their first game of the season in October 2009 in a 3–1 win over the Providence Friars. The win would be the first of a four-game win streak after starting the season winless in the first six games. The start of the 2009–10 season was highlighted by eight straight road games to start the season, after a home exhibition game against the University of Guelph. By December 2009, the team was ranked in the ranked tenth in the USA Today/USA Hockey Magazine poll. The ranking marked the first time the Orange was nationally ranked in the program's history.

On March 5, 2010, the Orange won the first playoff game in program history. Sophomore Lisa Mullan scored two goals, as the Orange defeated Niagara by a score of 5–3. In addition, freshman Isabel Menard added three points. The Orange advanced to the CHA Championship against rival Mercyhurst but fell 1–3.

=== 2010–11 season ===
On October 1, 2010, by tying Northeastern in the season opener, it marked the first time that the Orange started the season unbeaten. Stefanie Marty had two goals in the game. Northeastern featured her twin sister Julia Marty. It was the first time the sisters had ever played against each other in their NCAA careers. With a 4–2 defeat of New Hampshire on October 8, 2010, the Orange is off to its best start in program history (1–0–1). In the win, senior transfer Ashley Cockell scored her first career goal for the Orange. Freshman goaltender Kallie Billadeau made 26 saves as she played in her first game for the Orange.

The Orange continued their best start in program history with a 2–2–1 record. The Orange registered a 7–1 win against Connecticut on the 16th of October. Syracuse's seven goals against Connecticut ties for second all-time in Orange history. Twelve different players registered points. Isabel Menard recorded the first hat trick in school history and added an assist. In addition, freshman Sadie St. Germain scored her first career goal and had two assists in the win. The Orange outshot the Huskies 38–19. In faceoffs, they had a 38–17 advantage over them. On November 30, Kallie Billadeau set a Syracuse record with 57 saves in a 4–1 loss against No. 1 Cornell. By December 6, 2010, Isabel Menard had nine multiple-point scoring games, setting a Syracuse program record. The team ended the season

=== 2018-2019 ===
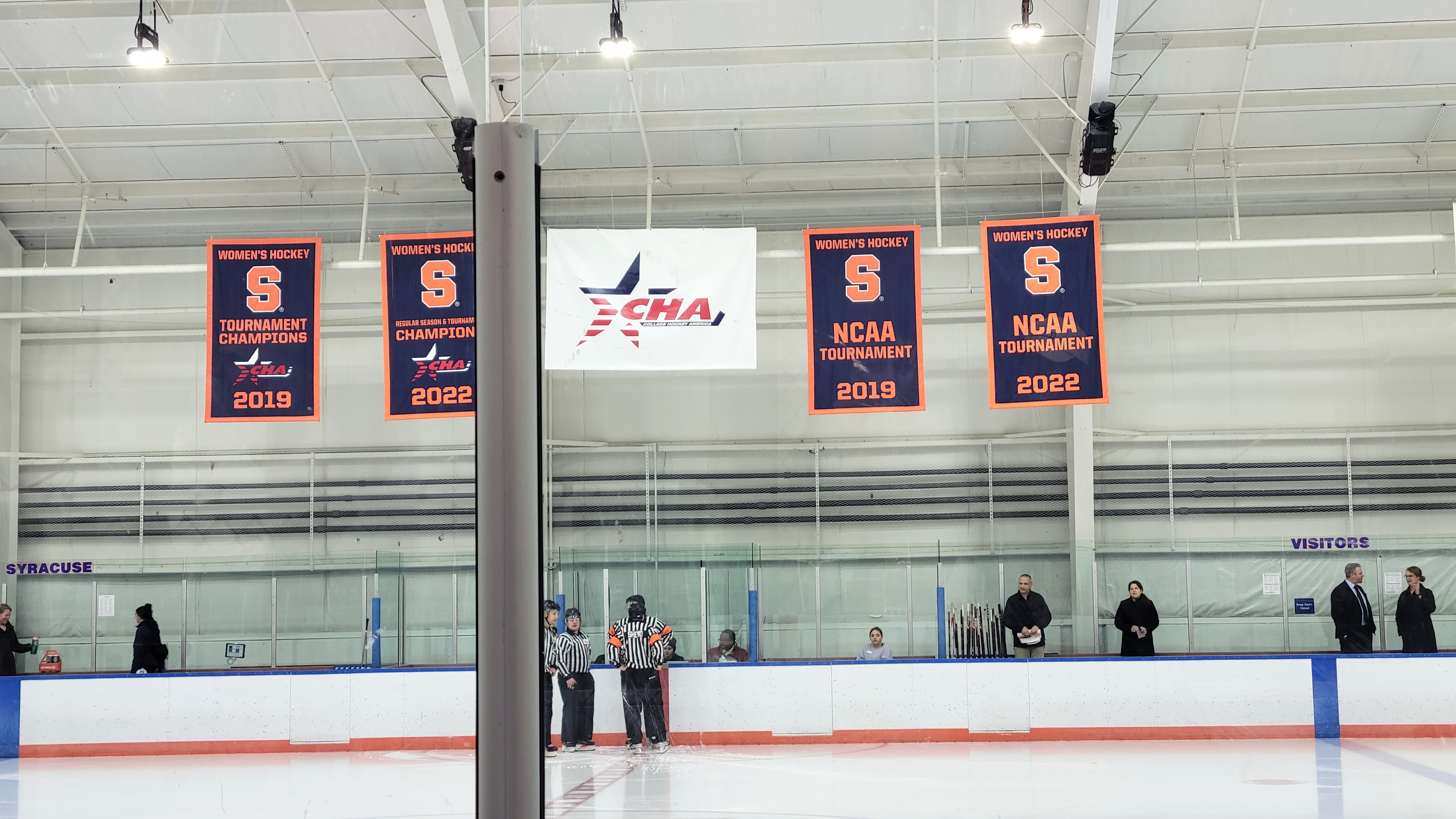
Syracuse NCAA and CHA tournament win rafters at Tennity Ice Skating Pavilion.

Syracuse won its first CHA Tournament championship in 2019, defeating Robert Morris by a score of 6–2. Orange forward Lindsay Eastwood scored three goals in the tournament, tying the league record. It was Syracuse's 7th appearance in the championship game. En route, they defeated Lindenwood in the quarterfinals and Mercyhurst in the semi-finals. As CHA champions, the Orange earned an automatic berth in the NCAA tournament, their first appearance ever. They played Wisconsin in the first round, losing 4–0. Allie Munroe won the CHA Defenseman of the Year award, and forward Lauren Bellefontaine won CSA Rookie of the Year.

== Coaches ==
Head coach Paul Flanagan, who started the program at SU, retired at the end of 2021–22 season after 14 seasons. At Syracuse, he was a four-time CHA Coach of the Year compiled a 204-225-49 record.

In May 2022, former Clarkson University assistant coach Britni Smith was named the 2nd head coach in program history.

Brian Idalski was announced as the program's third head coach on July 14, 2026.

== Year by year statistics ==
Won championship	Lost championship	Conference champions	League leader

Year	Coach	W	L	T	Conference	Conf. W	Conf. L	Conf. T	Finish	Conference Tournament	NCAA Tournament
2024-25	Britni Smith	15	23	0	CHA	11	9	0	3rd CHA	Won Quarterfinals vs. Robert Morris (3-22OT); Lost Semifinal vs. Mercyhurst (1-0, 0-4, 2-5)	Did not qualify
2023-24	Britni Smith	7	24	3	CHA	4	14	2	6th CHA	Did not qualify	Did not qualify
2022-23	Britni Smith	10	24	2	CHA	6	9	1	3rd CHA	Lost Semifinal vs. Mercyhurst (3-5, 0-6)	Did not qualify
2021-22	Paul Flanagan	15	11	6	CHA	11	4	1	1st CHA	Won Semifinals vs. RIT (3-2); Won Championship vs. Mercyhurst (3-2)	Lost First Round vs. Quinnipiac (0-4)
2020-21	Paul Flanagan	12	9	1	CHA	8	6	1	4th CHA	Won Quarterfinals vs. Lindenwood (6-0); Won Semifinal vs. Penn State (3-2); Lost Championship vs. Robert Morris (0-1)	Did not qualify
2019–20	Paul Flanagan	14	20	2	CHA	7	12	0	3rd CHA	Won Quarterfinals vs. Lindenwood (4-0); Lost Semifinal vs. Robert Morris (2-5)	Did not qualify
2018–19	Paul Flanagan	13	22	3	CHA	10	8	2	3rd CHA	Won Quarterfinals vs. RIT (5–1); Won Semifinal vs. Mercyhurst (4-3); Won Championship vs. Robert Morris (6-2)	Lost Quarterfinals vs. Wisconsin (0-4)
2017–18	Paul Flanagan	13	21	3	CHA	11	8	1	3rd CHA	Won Quarterfinals vs. RIT (5–1); Lost Semifinal vs. Mercyhurst (2-3OT)	Did not qualify
2016–17	Paul Flanagan	16	13	5	CHA	14	4	2	2nd CHA	Won Semifinals vs. RIT (4–0); Lost Championship vs. Robert Morris (0–2)	Did not qualify
2015–16	Paul Flanagan	19	14	3	CHA	14	4	2	2nd CHA	Won Semifinals vs. Penn State (3–2 3OT); Lost Championship vs. Mercyhurst (3–4 OT)	Did not qualify
2014–15	Paul Flanagan	11	15	10	CHA	8	6	6	2nd CHA	Won Semifinals vs. Penn State (2–0); Lost Championship vs. RIT (1–2 2OT)	Did not qualify
2013–14	Paul Flanagan	8	8	2	CHA	9	8	3	4th CHA	Won Quarterfinals vs. Lindenwood (4–1, 6–0); Lost Semifinals vs. Mercyhurst (1–2)	Did not qualify
2012–13	Paul Flanagan	20	15	1	CHA	13	6	1	2nd CHA	Won Semifinals vs. RIT (2–1 OT); Lost Championship vs. Mercyhurst (1–4)	Did not qualify
2011–12	Paul Flanagan	10	22	3	CHA	1	8	3	4th CHA	Lost Semifinals vs. Mercyhurst (3–4)	Did not qualify
2010–11	Paul Flanagan	14	16	6	CHA	7	6	3	3rd CHA	Won Semifinals vs. Niagara (1–0); Lost Championship vs. Mercyhurst (4–5)	Did not qualify
2009–10	Paul Flanagan	18	17	1	CHA	8	8	0	3rd CHA	Won Semifinals vs. Niagara (5–3); Lost Championship vs. Mercyhurst (1–3)	Did not qualify
2008–09	Paul Flanagan	9	16	3	CHA	2	11	3	5th CHA	Lost First Round vs. Niagara (2–3)	Did not qualify

== Current roster ==
As of May 28, 2026.

No.	Nat.	Player	Class	Pos	Height	DoB	Hometown	Previous team
2		Stella Costabile	Sophomore	F	5' 6" (1.68 m)	2005-08-12	Belmar, New Jersey	Philadelphia Jr Flyers
3		Emma Knade	Freshman	F	5' 3" (1.6 m)	2007-07-23	Fenton, Missouri	Lindbergh High
5		Jamison Hirsh	Freshman	F	5' 4" (1.63 m)	2007-08-01	Bensalem, Pennsylvania	Philadelphia Jr Flyers
7		Maya D'Arcy (A)	Senior	D	5' 5" (1.65 m)	2004-04-12	Cambridge, Ontario	Cambridge Rivulettes
8		Jocelyn Fiala	Junior	D	5' 8" (1.73 m)	2005-10-08	Clavet, Saskatchewan	Saskatoon Stars
9		Kambel Beacom	Junior	D	5' 4" (1.63 m)	2002-03-02	Elmira, Ontario	Cambridge Rivulettes
10		Erin Brousseau	Sophomore	F	5' 7" (1.7 m)	2002-01-03	St. Louis Park, Minnesota	St. Louis Park High School
11		Sarah Thompson	Junior	F	5' 6" (1.68 m)	2002-01-08	Ottawa, Ontario	Nepean Jr. Wildcats
12		Sydnee Wilson	Freshman	F	5' 6" (1.68 m)	2003-02-25	North Vancouver, British Columbia	Delta Hockey Academy
13		Mikayla Todd	Freshman	F	5' 7" (1.7 m)	2002-02-08	Oshawa, Ontario	Kingston Jr. Ice Wolves
14		Terryn Mozes	Sophomore	D	5' 4" (1.63 m)	2003-01-01	Ottawa, Ontario	Nepean Jr. Hurricanes
15		Sarah Marchand	Sophomore	F	5' 3" (1.6 m)	2003-04-01	Belle River, Ontario	Southwest Wildcats
16		Rayla Clemons	Junior	F	5' 2" (1.57 m)	2001-10-01	Franklin, Michigan	Pittsburgh Penguins Elite
17		Rhea Hicks	Freshman	F	5' 3" (1.6 m)	2004-10-04	Etobicoke, Ontario	Mississauga Jr. Hurricanes
18		Tatum White	Junior	F	5' 10" (1.78 m)	2002-10-21	Kingston, Ontario	Kingston Jr. Ice Wolves
19		Anna Leschyshyn	Senior	F	6' 0" (1.83 m)	2001-06-29	Grasswood, Saskatchewan	Saskatoon Stars
20		Madison Primeau	Sophomore	F	5' 11" (1.8 m)	2003-12-23	Etobicoke, Ontario	Mississauga Jr. Hurricanes
21		Mae Batherson	Senior	D	5' 8" (1.73 m)	2000-12-05	New Minas, Nova Scotia	Kingston Jr. Ice Wolves
22		Charlotte Hallett	Freshman	D	6' 0" (1.83 m)	2004-02-02	Markham, Ontario	Pittsburgh Penguins Elite
23		Marielle McHale	Graduate	F	5' 10" (1.78 m)	1999-05-27	Clifton Park, New York	Williston Northampton School
24		Gabby Dougherty	Freshman	D	5' 5" (1.65 m)	2004-07-11	Ann Arbor, Michigan	Little Caesars
25		Hannah Johnson	Junior	D	5' 3" (1.6 m)	2001-09-06	Readfield, Maine	Stanstead College
27		Heidi Knoll	Freshman	F	5' 5" (1.65 m)	2004-01-21	Ottawa, Ontario	Nepean Jr. Wildcats
32		Arielle DeSmet	Graduate	G	5' 5" (1.65 m)	2000-08-02	Charlotte, Vermont	Robert Morris University
33		Amelia Van Vliet	Junior	G	5' 8" (1.73 m)	2001-05-18	Kemptville, Ontario	Kingston Jr. Ice Wolves

== Exhibition games ==
- On November 28 and 29, 2008, Syracuse travelled to Ottawa, Ontario to participate in two exhibition games with two Canadian universities. The Orange defeated Carleton University by a score of 3–1 on the 28th but felt to the University of Ottawa in a 4–3 overtime loss.
- The Orange played the McGill Martlets women's ice hockey team in Montreal, Quebec. McGill was ranked number one in Canada, but Syracuse provided a valiant effort. The Martlets outshot the Orange by a tiny margin of 30–28 and won the game by a score of 4–2. Julie Rising and Megan Skelly each had two points for the Orange.

== Olympians ==
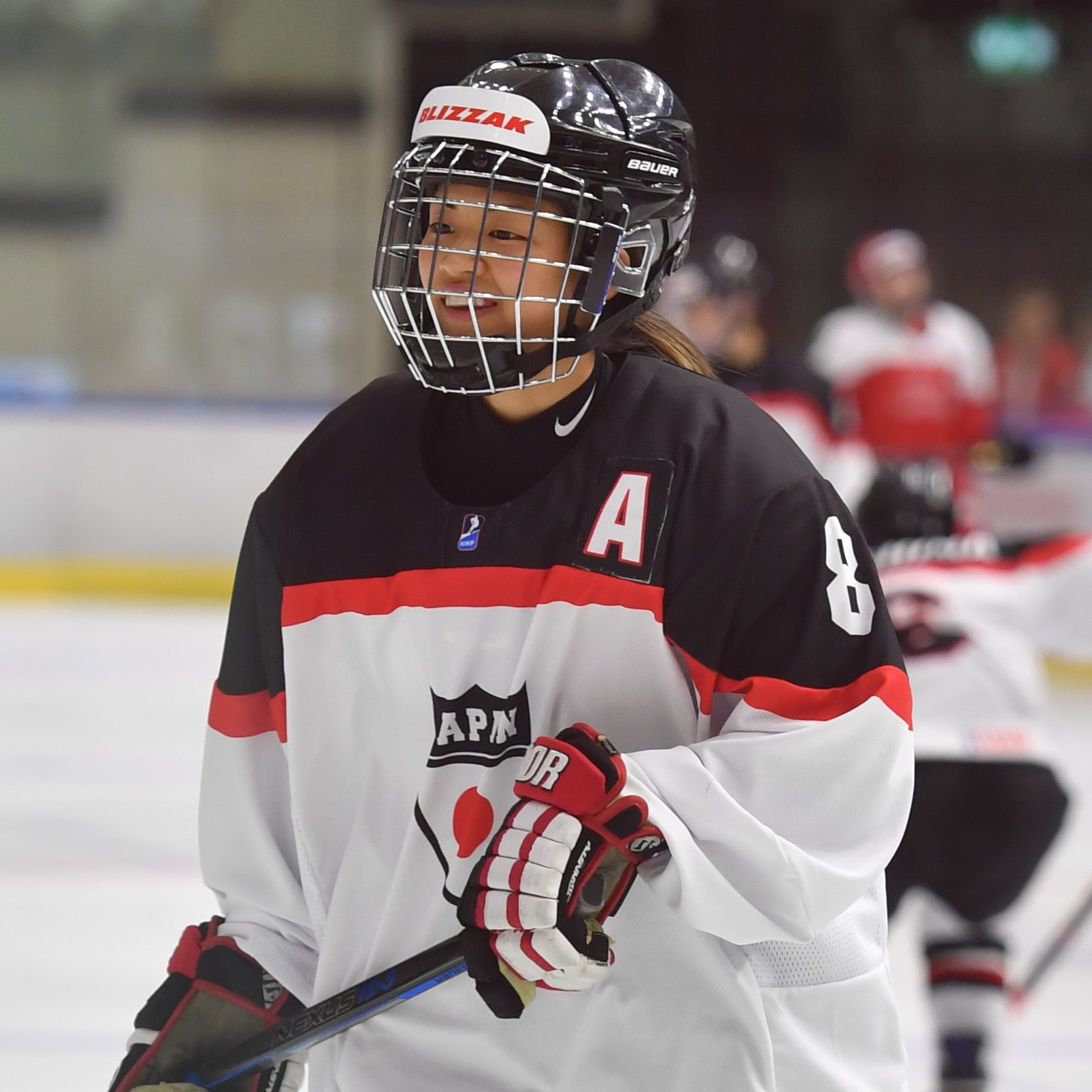
Akane Hosoyamada played for the Japan women's national ice hockey team.

Player	Event	Nationality	Finish
Stefanie Marty	2010 Winter Olympics – Ice hockey	Switzerland	5th
Akane Hosoyamada	2018 Winter Olympics – Ice hockey	Japan	6th
Akane Hosoyamada	2022 Winter Olympics – Ice hockey	Japan	6th

=== International ===
Player	Event	Nationality	Finish
Isabel Menard	2011 MLP Nations Cup	Canada	Gold
Akane Hosoyamada	2017 Asian Winter Games	Japan	Gold
Akane Hosoyamada	2017 IIHF Women's World Championship Division I	Japan	Gold
Akane Hosoyamada	2019 IIHF Women's World Championship	Japan	8

== Awards and honors ==
- Gabrielle Beaudry, CHA Defensive Player of the Week (February 15, 2010)
- Erin Burns, CHA Rookie of the Week (November 30, 2009)
- Holly Carrie-Mattimoe, CHA Rookie of the Week (Week of January 11, 2010)
- Abbey Miller, 2016 CHA Goaltending champion
- Jenn Gilligan, Syracuse, CHA Goaltender of the Month (March 2015)
- Stephanie Grossi – Syracuse, 2014–15 CHA Rookie of the Year
- Stefanie Marty, CHA Offensive Player of the Week, (Week of October 12, 2009)
- Stefany Marty, CHA Offensive Player of the Week, (Week of December 13, 2009)
- Isabel Menard, CHA Rookie of the Week, (Week of October 12, 2009)
- Isabel Menard, CHA Rookie of the Week, (Week of October 19, 2009)
- Isabel Menard, CHA Rookie of the Week, (Week of November 23, 2009)
- Isabel Menard, CHA Rookie of the Week, (Week of December 7, 2009)
- Isabel Menard, CHA Rookie of the Week (Week of February 8, 2010)
- Isabel Menard, 2011 Patty Kazmaier Award Nominee
- Julie Rising, CHA Player of the Week, (Week of February 1)
- Lucy Schoedel, CHA Defensive Player of the Week, (Week of November 23)
- Lucy Schoedel, CHA Defensive Player of the Week, (Week of December 13)
- Lucy Schoedel, Nominee for Patty Kazmaier Memorial Award

=== CHA Major Awards ===
- Paul Flanagan, 2015 CHA Coach of the Year
- Paul Flanagan, 2013 CHA Coach of the Year
- Paul Flanagan, 2010 CHA Coach of the Year
- Isabel Menard, CHA 2010 Rookie of the Year
- Allie Munroe, 2017 CHA Best Defenseman
- Allie Munroe, 2019 CHA Best Defenseman
- Lauren Bellefontaine, 2019 CHA Rookie of the Year
- Jessica DiGirolamo, 2021–22 CHA Defensive Player of the Year Award
- Jessica DiGirolamo, 2020–21 CHA Defensive Player of the Year Award
- Abby Moloughney, 2020–21 CHA Best Defensive Forward

=== Pre-Season All-CHA Team ===
- G – Lucy Schoedel, 2009 selection

=== All-CHA First Team ===
- Isabel Menard, First Team All-CHA 2010
- Isabel Menard, 2011 All-CHA First Team
- Melissa Piacentini: Syracuse, 2014–15 All-CHA First Team
- Nicole Renault: Syracuse, 2014–15 All-CHA First Team
- Stephanie Grossi, Syracuse, 2015–2016, All CHA First Team
- Allie Munroe, 2018-19 All CHA First Team

=== All-CHA Second Team ===
- Stefanie Marty, Second Team All-CHA 2010
- Brittaney Maschmeyer, Second Team All-CHA 2010
- Gabrielle Beaudry, Second Team All-CHA 2010
- Lucy Schoedel, Second Team All-CHA 2010
- Jennifer Gilligan: Syracuse, 2014–15 All-CHA Second Team
- Akane Hosoyamada: Syracuse, 2014–15 All-CHA Second Team
- Emma Polask, 2018-19 All-CHA Second Team

=== CHA All-Rookie Team ===
- Holly Carrie-Mattimoe, 2010 selection
- Isabel Menard, 2010 selection
- Kallie Billadeau, 2011 CHA All-Rookie team
- Akane Hosoyamada, 2011 CHA All-Rookie team
- Alsyha Burriss: Syracuse, 2014–15 CHA All- Rookie Team
- Stephanie Grossi: Syracuse, 2014–15 CHA All- Rookie Team

=== CHA All-Tournament Team ===
- Lisa Mullan, 2010 tournament
- Gabrielle Beaudry, 2010 tournament
- Lucy Schoedel, 2010 tournament

== Orange in professional hockey ==
= CWHL All-Star	= NWHL All-Star	= Clarkson Cup Champion	= Isobel Cup Champion

Player	Position	Team(s)	League(s)	Years	Titles
Holly Carrie Mattimoe	Forward	Toronto Furies	CWHL		2014 Clarkson Cup
Shiann Darkangelo	Forward	Connecticut Whale; Buffalo Beauts; Kunlun Red Star; Toronto Furies; Toronto Six	NWHL CWHL NWHL		
Lindsay Eastwood	Forward	Toronto Six	NWHL	1	
Akane Hosoyamada	Defence	DK Peregrine; Calgary Inferno	WJIHL; CWHL	4	
Stefanie Marty	Forward	SC Reinach Damen; Linköping HC; HC Université Neuchâtel Dames	SWHL A Riksserien (W); SWHL A (W)		
Isabel Menard	Forward	Lugano; ZSC Lions Frauen	SWHL	2	
Elizabeth Scala	Forward	ESC Planegg; Perth Inferno	Frauen-Bundesliga (W); AWIHL		

== See also ==
- List of college women's ice hockey coaches with 250 wins (Paul Flanagan ranks seventh on all-time list)
