= 2018–19 NCAA Division I women's ice hockey rankings =

- NCAA tournament: 2019
- Preseason No. 1 (USA Today): Clarkson
- Preseason No. 1 (USCHO): Clarkson
- NCAA Division I women's ice hockey rankings

Two polls made up the 2018–19 NCAA Division I women's ice hockey rankings, the USCHO.com poll and the USA Today/USA Hockey Magazine poll. As the 2018–19 season progresses, rankings were updated weekly.

== Legend ==
	Increase in ranking
	Decrease in ranking
	Not ranked previous week
Italics	Number of first place votes
(#-#)	Win–loss–tie record
т	Tied with team above or below also with this symbol

== USCHO ==
	Preseason Sep 17	Week 1 Oct 1	Week 2 Oct 8	Week 3 Oct 15	Week 4 Oct 22	Week 5 Oct 29	Week 6 Nov 5	Week 7 Nov 12	Week 8 Nov 19	Week 9 Nov 26	Week 10 Dec 3	Week 11 Dec 10	Week 12 Jan 7	Week 13 Jan 14	Week 14 Jan 21	Week 15 Jan 28	Week 16 Feb 4	Week 17 Feb 11	Week 18 Feb 18	Week 19 Feb 25	Week 20 Mar 4	Week 21 Mar 11	Final Mar 25	
1.	Clarkson (18)	Clarkson (2–0–0) (14)	Clarkson (4–0–0) (15)	Clarkson (4–0–0) (14)	Wisconsin (8–0–0) (15)	Wisconsin (9–1–0) (14)	Wisconsin (11–1–0) (15)	Wisconsin (11–1–0) (15)	Wisconsin (13–1–0) (15)	Wisconsin (15–1–0) (13)	Wisconsin (17–1–0) (13)	Wisconsin (19–1–0) (13)	Wisconsin (19–1–0) (14)	Wisconsin (20–2–0) (11)	Wisconsin (21–3–0) (13)	Wisconsin (23–3–0) (10)	Minnesota (25–4–1) (10)	Minnesota (25–4–1) (12)	Wisconsin (28–4–0) (9)	Minnesota (29–4–1) (13)	Minnesota (29–4–1) (14)	Wisconsin (32–4–2) (14)	Wisconsin (35–4–2) (15)	1.
2.	Wisconsin	Wisconsin (2–0–0) (1)	Wisconsin (4–0–0)	Wisconsin (6–0–0) (1)	Clarkson (5–1–0)	Minnesota (7–2–1) (1)	Minnesota (9–2–1)	Minnesota (9–2–1)	Minnesota (11–2–1)	Minnesota (13–2–1) (1)	Minnesota (15–2–1) (2)	Minnesota (17–2–1) (2)	Minnesota (19–2–1) (1)	Minnesota (21–2–1) (4)	Minnesota (22–3–1) (2)	Minnesota (24–3–1) (5)	Wisconsin (24–4–0) (5)	Wisconsin (26–4–0) (3)	Minnesota (27–4–1) (6)	Wisconsin (28–4–2) (2)	Wisconsin (30–4–2) (1)	Minnesota (30–5–1) (1)	Minnesota (32–6–1)	2.
3.	Minnesota	Minnesota (2–0–0)	Minnesota (3–0–1)	Minnesota (5–0–1)	Minnesota (6–1–1)	Clarkson (7–1–0)	Clarkson (9–1–0)	Clarkson (9–1–0)	Clarkson (10–2–0)	Clarkson (12–2–0)	Northeastern (13–2–2)	Northeastern (13–2–2)	Northeastern (14–2–3)	Northeastern (15–3–3)	Northeastern (17–3–3)	Northeastern (19–3–3)	Northeastern (20–3–3)	Northeastern (21–3–4)	Northeastern (22–5–4)	Northeastern (23–5–5)	Northeastern (25–5–5)	Northeastern (27–5–5)	Clarkson (30–8–2)	3.
4.	Boston College (1)	Minnesota Duluth (2–0–0)	Minnesota Duluth (2–1–1)	Ohio State (5–1–0)	Ohio State(6–2–0)	Ohio State (7–3–0)	Ohio State (9–3–0)	Boston College (8–3–0)	Boston College (10–3–0)	Boston College (12–3–0)	Cornell (8–1–4)	Cornell (8–1–4)	Cornell (8–1–4)	Princeton (13–2–5)	Princeton (13–2–5)	Princeton (13–2–5)	Clarkson (22–5–1)	Clarkson (23–6–1)	Cornell (18–3–6)	Cornell (20–3–6)	Clarkson (27–7–2)	Clarkson (29–7–2)	Cornell (24–6–6)	4.
5.	Colgate	Ohio State (2–0–0)	Ohio State (3–1–0)	Minnesota Duluth (2–3–1)	Minnesota Duluth (4–3–1)	Boston College (7–2–0)	Boston College (8–3–0)	Northeastern (10–1–1)	Northeastern (11–1–2)	Northeastern (11–1–2)	Clarkson (12–4–0)	Clarkson (14–4–0)	Princeton (12–2–4)	Ohio State (15–7–0)	Clarkson (18–5–1)	Clarkson (20–5–1)	Princeton (15–3–5)	Princeton (17–3–5)	Clarkson (24–7–1)	Clarkson (25–7–2)	Cornell (22–4–6)	Boston College (26–11–1)	Northeastern (27–6–5)	5.
6.	Cornell	Boston College (0–2–0)	Boston College (1–2–0)	Boston College (3–2–0)	Boston College (5–2–0)	Cornell (3–0–0)	Northeastern (8–1–1)	Cornell (4–1–2)	Ohio State (11–5–0)	Ohio State (11–5–0)	Princeton (7–2–3)	Princeton (9–2–3)	Clarkson (14–5–0)	Clarkson (16–5–1)	Cornell (11–2–5)	Cornell (13–2–5)	Cornell (16–2–5)	Cornell (16–3–6)	Princeton (18–4–5)	Boston College (23–10–1)	Boston College (25–10–1)	Cornell (23–5–6)	Boston College (26–12–1)	6.
7.	Ohio State	Cornell (0–0–0)	Cornell (0–0–0)	Cornell (0–0–0)	Cornell (0–0–0)	Minnesota Duluth (5–4–1)	Cornell (4–1–0)	Minnesota Duluth (10–3–1) т	Cornell (5–1–3)	Cornell (6–1–4)	Ohio State (12–6–0)	Providence (15–3–0)	Ohio State (14–6–0)	Cornell (9–2–5)	Ohio State (15–9–0)	Boston College (18–9–0)	Boston College (19–9–0)	Boston University (16–6–7)	Boston College (23–10–0)	Princeton (18–6–5)	Princeton (20–6–5)	Princeton (20–7–5)	Princeton (20–8–5)	7.
8.	Northeastern	Colgate (1–1–0)	Colgate (2–2–0)	Colgate (3–3–0)	Northeastern (4–1–1)	Northeastern (6–1–1)	Minnesota Duluth (5–4–1)	Ohio State (9–5–0) т	St. Lawrence (8–5–1)	Providence (12–2–0)	Providence (13–3–0)	Ohio State (12–6–0)	Providence (16–4–0)	Colgate (16–6–4)	Colgate (14–6–4)	Boston University (14–6–6)	Boston University (15–6–6)	Boston College (20–10–0)	Boston University (18–6–8)	Boston University (19–7–8)	Boston University (21–7–8)	Boston University (21–8–8)	Boston University (21–8–8)	8.
9.	Minnesota Duluth	Northeastern (0–0–0)	Northeastern (1–0–1)	Northeastern (2–1–1)	Colgate (3–3–0)	Colgate (5–3–0)	St. Lawrence (6–5–1)	St. Lawrence (6–5–1)	Providence (10–2–0)	St. Lawrence (9–6–1)	Boston College (12–6–0)	Colgate (11–5–2)	Colgate (11–6–3)	Providence (16–6–0)	Boston College (16–9–0)	Ohio State (15–11–0)	Ohio State (17–11–0)	Colgate (17–8–5)	Colgate (19–8–5)	Colgate (21–8–5)	Ohio State (20–12–2)	Ohio State (20–13–2)	Ohio State (20–13–2)	9.
10.	Mercyhurst	St. Lawrence (1–1–0)	St. Lawrence (2–1–1)	Maine (4–0–0)	St. Lawrence (3–4–1)	St. Lawrence (4–5–1)	Colgate (6–4–0)	Providence (8–2–0)	Princeton (5–2–3)	Princeton (5–2–3)	Colgate (9–5–2)	Boston College (13–7–0)	Boston College (13–8–0)	Boston College (14–9–0)	Boston University (13–6–5)	Colgate (14–8–4)	Colgate (16–8–4)	Ohio State (18–12–0)	Ohio State (18–12–0)	Ohio State (18–12–2)	Colgate (23–9–5)	Providence (24–11–2)	Colgate (23–10–5)	10.
	Preseason Sep 17	Week 1 Oct 1	Week 2 Oct 8	Week 3 Oct 15	Week 4 Oct 22	Week 5 Oct 29	Week 6 Nov 5	Week 7 Nov 12	Week 8 Nov 19	Week 9 Nov 26	Week 10 Dec 3	Week 11 Dec 10	Week 12 Jan 7	Week 13 Jan 14	Week 14 Jan 21	Week 15 Jan 28	Week 16 Feb 4	Week 17 Feb 11	Week 18 Feb 18	Week 19 Feb 25	Week 20 Mar 4	Week 21 Mar 11	Final Mar 25	
		Dropped: Mercyhurst	None	Dropped: St. Lawrence	Dropped: Maine	None	None	Dropped: Colgate	Dropped: Minnesota Duluth	None	Dropped: St. Lawrence	None	None	None	Dropped: Providence	None	None	None	None	None	None	Dropped: Colgate	Dropped: Providence	

== USA Today ==
	Preseason Sep 25	Week 1 Oct 2	Week 2	Week 3	Week 4	Week 5	Week 6	Week 7	Week 8	Week 9	Week 10	Week 11	Week 12	Week 13	Week 14	Week 15	Week 16	Week 17	Week 18	Week 19	Week 20	Week 21	Final	
1.	Clarkson (18)	Clarkson (2–0–0) (18)																						1.
2.	Wisconsin (1)	Wisconsin (2–0–0) (1)																						2.
3.	Minnesota	Minnesota (2–0–0)																						3.
4.	Boston College	Minnesota Duluth (2–0–0)																						4.
5.	Colgate	Ohio State (2–0–0)																						5.
6.	Cornell	Boston College (0–2–0)																						6.
7.	Ohio State	Cornell (0–0–0)																						7.
8.	Northeastern	Colgate (1–1–0)																						8.
9.	Minnesota Duluth	Northeastern (0–0–0)																						9.
10.	Mercyhurst	Mercyhurst (0–2–0)																						10.
	Preseason Sep 25	Week 1 Oct 2	Week 2	Week 3	Week 4	Week 5	Week 6	Week 7	Week 8	Week 9	Week 10	Week 11	Week 12	Week 13	Week 14	Week 15	Week 16	Week 17	Week 18	Week 19	Week 20	Week 21	Final	
		None	None	None	None	None	None	None	None	None	None	None	None	None	None	None	None	None	None	None	None	None	None	
