= 2015–16 New York Riveters season =

First in franchise history

2015–16 New York Riveters
- League: 4th NWHL
- 2015–16 record: 4–12–2
- Home record: 2–5–2
- Road record: 2–7–0
- Goals for: 40
- Goals against: 76

Team information
- General manager: Dani Rylan
- Coach: Chad Wiseman
- Captain: Ashley Johnston
- Alternate captains: Morgan Fritz-Ward; Madison Packer
- Arena: Aviator Sports and Events Center

Team leaders
- Goals: Bray Ketchum (10)
- Assists: Brooke Ammerman (10)
- Points: Bray Ketchum (14); Brooke Ammerman
- Penalty minutes: Brooke Ammerman (26)
- Wins: Nana Fujimoto (4)
- Goals against average: Nana Fujimoto (3.28)

The 2015–16 New York Riveters season was the first in franchise history and the National Women's Hockey League's inaugural season.

== Offseason ==
=== Spring free agent camp ===
During May 2015, all four teams held player evaluation camps for free agents. The list of players that attended the Riveters evaluation camp on May 23 and 24 were split into Team Red and Team White.

Team Red

| Number | Player | Position | Nationality | Previous Team |
| 2 | Chelsae VanGlahn | Forward | United States | Plattsburgh State |
| 3 | Syliva Xistris | Forward | United States | Colby Mules women's ice hockey |
| 6 | Kayla McDonagh | Forward | United States | St. Thomas |
| 7 | Erika Lawler | Forward | United States | Boston Blades |
| 8 | Hayley Williams | Forward | United States | Miami University (Ohio) |
| 9 | Nicole Giannino | Forward | United States | Holy Cross Crusaders women's ice hockey |
| 10 | Lindsay Grigg | Forward/Defense | Canada | RIT Tigers women's ice hockey |
| 11 | Elena Orlando | Forward/Defense | United States | Quinnipiac Bobcats women's ice hockey |
| 13 | Ashley Johnston | Defense | Canada | Union Dutchwomen ice hockey |
| 14 | Brianne Mahoney | Defense | United States | Princeton Tigers women's ice hockey |
| 15 | Madison Marzario | Defense | United States | RPI Engineers women's ice hockey |
| 30 | Heather Rossi | Goaltender | United States | Penn State Nittany Lions women's ice hockey |

Team White

| Number | Player | Position | Nationality | Previous Team |
| 1 | Zoe Zisis | Goaltender | United States | Boston Blades |
| 2 | Morgan Fritz-Ward | Forward | United States | Quinnipiac Bobcats women's ice hockey |
| 4 | Cherie Stewart | Forward | United States | Manahattanville |
| 5 | Samantha Weinberg | Forward | United States | Cornell Big Red women's ice hockey |
| 6 | Kristen Levesque | Forward | United States | Rhode Island University |
| 7 | Hailey Browne | Forward | Canada | Maine Black Bears women's ice hockey |
| 8 | Denise Cardello | Forward | United States | Castleton State |
| 9 | Taylor Holze | Forward | United States | Boston University Terriers women's ice hockey |
| 10 | Taylor Mahoney | Forward | United States | RPI Engineers women's ice hockey |
| 11 | Celeste Brown | Forward | United States | RIT Tigers women's ice hockey |
| 12 | Courtney Flynn | Defense | United States | Manhattanville College |
| 13 | Maggie Joyce | Defense | United States | New Hampshire Wildcats women's ice hockey |
| 14 | Erica Kromm | Defense | Canada | Calgary Inferno |
| 15 | Navraj Raj | Defense | Canada | Western Mustangs women's ice hockey |

== Regular season ==
=== News and notes ===
- Meghan Fardelmann scored the first hat trick in Riveters history in a December 27 match against the Buffalo Beauts.
- On December 31, 2015, Fardelman was one of two Riveters players (including Bray Ketchum) that were loaned to the Boston Pride. The two donned the Pride jerseys for one day and participated in the 2015 Women's Winter Classic, the first outdoor professional women's hockey game.

=== Standings ===
| Pos | Team | GP | W | L | OTL | W% | GF | GA | GD | Pts |
|---|---|---|---|---|---|---|---|---|---|---|
| 1 | y – Boston Pride | 18 | 14 | 3 | 1 | 0.806 | 75 | 39 | +36 | 29 |
| 2 | Connecticut Whale | 18 | 13 | 5 | 0 | 0.722 | 61 | 51 | +10 | 26 |
| 3 | Buffalo Beauts | 18 | 5 | 9 | 4 | 0.389 | 56 | 66 | −10 | 14 |
| 4 | New York Riveters | 18 | 4 | 12 | 2 | 0.278 | 40 | 76 | −36 | 10 |

Source: PHF
y – Clinched division

=== Game log ===
2015–16 Schedule

| Game | Date | Opponent | Score | OT | Decision | Location | Record | Points | Gamesheet |
|---|---|---|---|---|---|---|---|---|---|
| 1 | October 11 | @ Connecticut Whale | 1–4 | | Fujimoto | Chelsea Piers CT | 0–1–0 | 0 | |
| 2 | October 18 | Boston Pride | 7–1 | | Lundberg | Aviator Sports and Events Center | 0–2–0 | 0 | |
| 3 | October 25 | Connecticut Whale | 3–1 | | Fujimoto | Aviator Sports and Events Center | 0–3–0 | 0 | |
| 4 | November 15 | Boston Pride | 2–3 | | Fujimoto | Aviator Sports and Events Center | 1–3–0 | 2 | |
| 5 | November 22 | @ Boston Pride | 3–2 | | Fujimoto | Bright Hockey Center | 2–3–0 | 4 | |
| 6 | November 29 | Buffalo Beauts | 3–1 | | Fujimoto | Aviator Sports and Events Center | 2–4–0 | 4 | |
| 7 | December 6 | @ Boston Pride | 1–4 | | Scrivens | Bright Hockey Center | 2–5–0 | 4 | |
| 8 | December 13 | Connecticut Whale | 4–3 | SO | Scrivens | Aviator Sports and Events Center | 2–5–1 | 5 | |
| 9 | December 27 | @ Buffalo Beauts | 7–3 | | Fujimoto | HarborCenter | 3–5–1 | 7 | |
| 10 | January 3 | Connecticut Whale | 6–1 | | Fujimoto | Aviator Sports and Events Center | 3–6–1 | 7 | |
| 11 | January 9 | @ Connecticut Whale | 3–4 | | Fujimoto | Ingalls Rink | 3–7–1 | 7 | |
| 12 | January 10 | @ Boston Pride | 1–8 | | Scrivens | Bright Hockey Center | 3–8–1 | 7 | |
| 13 | January 17 | Buffalo Beauts | 6–5 | SO | Scrivens | Aviator Sports and Events Center | 3–8–2 | 8 | |
| 14 | January 31 | @ Buffalo Beauts | 2–4 | | Fujimoto | HarborCenter | 3–9–2 | 8 | |
| 15 | February 6 | Boston Pride | 6–1 | | Laden | Aviator Sports and Events Center | 3–10–2 | 8 | |
| 16 | February 14 | Buffalo Beauts | 3–4 | SO | Fujimoto | Aviator Sports and Events Center | 4–10–2 | 10 | |
| 17 | February 21 | @ Buffalo Beauts | 1-5 | | Fujimoto | HarborCenter | 4–11–2 | 10 | |
| 18 | February 28 | @ Connecticut Whale | 2-4 | | Laden | Chelsea Piers CT | 4–12–2 | 10 | |

Win (2 points) Overtime/Shootout loss (1 point) Loss (0 points)

== Playoffs ==
=== Game log ===
2016 Isobel Cup Playoffs
Semifinals vs. Boston Pride; Boston won series 2–0

| Game | Date | Opponent | Score | OT | Decision | Location | Record | Gamesheet |
|---|---|---|---|---|---|---|---|---|
| 1 | Mar 4 | @ Boston Pride | 0–6 | | Scrivens | Raymond Bourque Arena | 0–1 | |
| 2 | Mar 5 | @ Boston Pride | 4–7 | | Fujimoto | Raymond Bourque Arena | 0–2 | |

Win Loss

== Statistics ==
Final

=== Skaters ===
Regular season
| Player | GP | G | A | Pts | PIM |
|---|---|---|---|---|---|
| Bray Ketchum | 18 | 10 | 4 | 14 | 18 |
| Brooke Ammerman | 16 | 4 | 10 | 14 | 26 |
| Lyudmila Belyakova | 17 | 5 | 5 | 10 | 20 |
| Janine Weber | 18 | 3 | 6 | 9 | 4 |
| Ashley Johnston | 16 | 1 | 6 | 7 | 8 |
| Kira Dosdall | 18 | 1 | 6 | 7 | 20 |
| Madison Packer | 16 | 3 | 4 | 7 | 22 |
| Meghan Fardelmann | 18 | 6 | 1 | 7 | 12 |
| Morgan Fritz-Ward | 17 | 4 | 2 | 6 | 8 |
| Celeste Brown | 18 | 0 | 4 | 4 | 24 |
| Sydney Kidd | 17 | 0 | 4 | 4 | 4 |
| Beth Hanrahan | 18 | 2 | 1 | 3 | 10 |
| Amber Moore | 15 | 0 | 2 | 2 | 14 |
| Elena Orlando | 17 | 0 | 1 | 1 | 12 |
| Gabie Figueroa | 18 | 1 | 0 | 1 | 18 |
| Taylor Holze | 9 | 0 | 1 | 1 | 2 |
| Cherie Stewart | 10 | 0 | 0 | 0 | 0 |
| Erin Barley-Maloney | 6 | 0 | 0 | 0 | 0 |
| Margot Scharfe | 11 | 0 | 0 | 0 | 0 |

Playoffs
| Player | GP | G | A | Pts | PIM |
|---|---|---|---|---|---|
| Beth Hanrahan | 2 | 0 | 1 | 1 | 2 |
| Brooke Ammerman | 2 | 0 | 1 | 1 | 6 |
| Celeste Brown | 2 | 1 | 0 | 1 | 4 |
| Kira Dosdall | 2 | 1 | 0 | 1 | 2 |
| Lyudmila Belyakova | 2 | 1 | 0 | 1 | 0 |
| Madison Packer | 2 | 1 | 0 | 1 | 4 |
| Amber Moore | 1 | 0 | 0 | 0 | 0 |
| Ashley Johnston | 2 | 0 | 0 | 0 | 0 |
| Bray Ketchum | 2 | 0 | 0 | 0 | 0 |
| Cherie Stewart | 1 | 0 | 0 | 0 | 0 |
| Elena Orlando | 2 | 0 | 0 | 0 | 4 |
| Gabie Figueroa | 2 | 0 | 0 | 0 | 4 |
| Janine Weber | 2 | 0 | 0 | 0 | 0 |
| Meghan Fardelmann | 2 | 0 | 0 | 0 | 2 |
| Sydney Kidd | 2 | 0 | 0 | 0 | 2 |
| Taylor Holze | 2 | 0 | 0 | 0 | 0 |

=== Goaltenders ===
Regular season
| Player | GP | TOI | W | L | OT | GA | GAA | SA | SV% | SO | PIM |
|---|---|---|---|---|---|---|---|---|---|---|---|
| Nana Fujimoto | 13 | 712:21 | 4 | 8 | 0 | 39 | 3.28 | 436 | 0.911 | 0 | 0 |
| Jenny Scrivens | 6 | 243:09 | 0 | 1 | 2 | 16 | 3.95 | 163 | 0.902 | 0 | 0 |
| Chelsea Laden^{†} | 2 | 119:25 | 0 | 2 | 0 | 9 | 4.52 | 60 | 0.850 | 0 | 0 |
| Shenae Lundberg^{‡} | 1 | 28:56 | 0 | 0 | 0 | 4 | 8.29 | 32 | 0.875 | 0 | 0 |
| Corinne Boyles | 0 | 00:00 | 0 | 0 | 0 | 0 | 0.00 | 0 | 0.000 | 0 | 0 |

Playoffs
| Player | GP | TOI | W | L | OT | GA | GAA | SA | SV% | SO | PIM |
|---|---|---|---|---|---|---|---|---|---|---|---|
| Jenny Scrivens | 2 | 96:32 | 0 | 2 | 0 | 8 | 4.97 | 89 | 0.910 | 0 | 0 |
| Nana Fujimoto | 1 | 20:51 | 0 | 0 | 0 | 4 | 11.51 | 18 | 0.778 | 0 | 0 |

^{†}Denotes player spent time with another team before joining the Riveters. Stats reflect time with the Riveters only.
^{‡}Denotes player was traded mid-season. Stats reflect time with the Riveters only.

== Roster ==
Updated January 31, 2016

| No. | Nat | Player | Pos | S/G | Age | Acquired | Birthplace |
|---|---|---|---|---|---|---|---|
| 20 | (United States) | Brooke Ammerman | F | R | 25 | 2015 | Teaneck, New Jersey |
| 22 | (United States) | Erin Barley-Maloney | F/D | L | 27 | 2015 | Raleigh, North Carolina |
| 9 | (Russia) | Lyudmila Belyakova | F | L | 21 | 2015 | Moscow, Russia |
| 24 | (United States) | Celeste Brown | F | R | 23 | 2015 | Great Falls, Montana |
| 26 | (United States) | Kiira Dosdall | D | F | 28 | 2015 | Stamford, Connecticut |
| 18 | (United States) | Meghan Fardelmann | F | R | 28 | 2015 | Lansing, Kansas |
| 21 | (United States) | Gabie Figueroa | D | L | 24 | 2015 | Branchburg, New Jersey |
| 35 | (United States) | Katie Fitzgerald | G | L | 21 | 2016 | Des Plaines, Illinois |
| 13 | (Canada) | Kaleigh Fratkin | D | R | 23 | 2016 | Burnaby, British Columbia |
| 11 | (United States) | Morgan Fritz-Ward (A) | F | R | 22 | 2015 | Mason City, Iowa |
| 10 | (Canada) | Ashley Johnston (C) | D | L | 23 | 2015 | Burlington, Ontario |
| 28 | (United States) | Amanda Kessel | F | R | 24 | 2016 | Madison, Wisconsin |
| 17 | (United States) | Bray Ketchum | F | L | 26 | 2016 | Greenwich, Connecticut |
| 8 | (Canada) | Sydney Kidd | F | L | 23 | 2015 | Sundridge, Ontario |
| 78 | (United States) | Chelsea Laden | G | L | 23 | 2016 | Lakeville, Minnesota |
| 32 | (Canada) | Jaimie Leonoff | G | L | 23 | 2016 | Montreal, Quebec |
| 4 | (United States) | Elena Orlando | D | L | 23 | 2015 | San Jose, California |
| 14 | (United States) | Madison Packer (A) | F | R | 24 | 2015 | Detroit, Michigan |
| 12 | (Austria) | Janine Weber | F | L | 24 | 2015 | Innsbruck, Austria |

== Awards and honors ==
NWHL Player of the Week

- Nana Fujimoto – November 15, 2015
- Meghan Fardelmann – December 29, 2015

NWHL 1st All-Star Game selection

- Morgan Fritz-Ward (Team Pfalzer – Fan Vote)
- Nana Fujimoto (Team Pfalzer)
- Madison Packer (Team Knight – Fan Vote)
- Janine Weber (Team Knight)

== Transactions ==
=== Trades ===
| January 27, 2016 | To Connecticut Whale Shenae Lundberg | To New York Riveters Chelsea Laden |

=== Signings ===
| Player | Date | Contract terms |
|---|---|---|
| Janine Weber | June 11, 2015 | $19,500 |
| Celeste Brown | June 26, 2015 | $15,000 |
| Kiira Dosdall | June 30, 2015 | $13,500 |
| Morgan Fritz-Ward | June 30, 2015 | $12,500 |
| Beth Hanrahan | July 10, 2015 | $10,500 |
| Madison Packer | July 14, 2015 | $15,000 |
| Lyudmila Belyakova | July 25, 2015 | $20,000 |
| Ashley Johnston | July 26, 2015 | $14,000 |
| Shenae Lundberg | July 26, 2015 | $15,000 |
| Nana Fujimoto | July 27, 2015 | $21,000 |
| Elena Orlando | July 31, 2015 | $10,000 |
| Meghan Fardelmann | August 3, 2015 | $20,000 |
| Jenny Scrivens | August 11, 2015 | $10,000 |
| Gabie Figueroa | August 15, 2015 | $10,000 |
| Brooke Ammerman | August 16, 2015 | $16,500 |
| Bray Ketchum | August 17, 2015 | $14,000 |
| Erin Barley-Maloney | August 18, 2015 | $14,000 |
| Sydney Kidd | September 24, 2015 | $15,000 |

== Draft ==
The following were the Riveters selections in the 2015 NWHL Draft on June 20, 2015.

| Round | # | Player | Pos | Nationality | College/Junior/Club team (League) |
|---|---|---|---|---|---|
| 1 | 1 | Alexandra Carpenter | F | United States | Boston College (HEA) |
| 2 | 5 | Haley Skarupa | F | United States | Boston College (HEA) |
| 3 | 9 | Erin Ambrose | D | Canada | Clarkson University (ECAC) |
| 4 | 13 | Dana Trivigno | F | United States | Boston College (HEA) |
| 5 | 17 | Kimberly Newell | G | Canada | Princeton University (ECAC) |
