= Jenny Scrivens =

American ice hockey player

- Born: June 19, 1988 (age 38) Camarillo, California, U.S.
- Height: 5 ft 9 in (175 cm)
- Position: Goaltender
- Caught: Left
- Played for: ECAC; Cornell; NWHL; New York Riveters
- Playing career: 2015–2016

Jennifer Anne Scrivens (née Niesluchowski, born June 19, 1988) is an American former professional ice hockey goaltender, who last played for the New York Riveters of the National Women's Hockey League (NWHL). Scrivens announced her retirement from the NWHL in 2016.

== Career (Hockey) ==
=== Amateur Hockey ===
==== California Selects (CAHA) ====
In 2005, Scrivens led her Cal Select U 19 AA team to the National Ice Hockey Championships. In the same year, she won the "Goaltender of the Year" Award.

=== Collegiate Hockey ===
==== The Big Red (ECAC) ====
Beginning in 2006, Scrivens served as goaltender during her freshmen, sophomore, and junior years at Cornell University, wearing number 30 for the Big Red. She played 52 games with a 15-28-2 record throughout her three-year tenure. Scrivens generated a save percentage of .916 in her final year, with 2.56 goals against average. Out of the 52 games Scrivens spent between the pipes, 19 of them were 30-save games. Throughout her 52-game tenure, Scrivens also recorded 1,336 career saves. Her career-high reached a whopping 53 saves in Cornell's first game of the 2008 ECAC Hockey quarterfinals against the Harvard Crimson. Unfortunately, the Big Red did not advance further than the 20th-ranked team. During her sophomore year, Scrivens won a "Goalie of the Week" honor in the ECAC.

In July 2015, she returned to her position on the Big Red during an alumni game that featured NHL players such as the Los Angeles Kings' right-winger captain Dustin Brown and the Buffalo Sabres' right-winger captain Brian Gionta.

=== Professional Hockey ===
==== The New York Riveters (NWHL) ====
Scrivens was drafted in August 2015 by the New York Riveters in the league's inaugural draft. Scrivens served as one of three goaltenders, sharing her duties with Nana Fujimoto and Shenae Lundberg.

The NWHL's inaugural season began October 11, 2015. On November 29 Scrivens was in net in a game for the first time, in relief for the injured Fujimoto, and she was the starting goaltender for the next two games.

In addition to her role on the team, Scrivens also served as a member of the NWHL's Public Relations Council during the league's first year. Scrivens retired from the NWHL after the 2015/16 season.

== Off the ice ==
=== Ronald MacDonald House Charity ===
Scrivens served as the Director of Communications at the Ronald McDonald House charities charter in Northern Alberta, Canada.

=== Hockey Wives ===
In March 2015, Scrivens joined the cast of Canadian W Network's Hockey Wives, a reality show documenting the lives of the wives and girlfriends (or "WAGs") of current and former players and coaches in the NHL. Alongside Scrivens, other hockey wives and girlfriends include Tiffany Parros, wife of former Montreal Canadien George Parros; Brijet Whitney, wife of former Dallas Star Ray Whitney; Kodette LaBarbera, wife of Philadelphia Flyers goaltender Jason LaBarbera; Maripier Morin, fiancée of Vancouver Canucks winger Brandon Prust; Wendy Tippett, wife of Arizona Coyotes head coach Dave Tippett; Martine Forget, fiancée to Toronto Maple Leafs goaltender Jonathan Bernier; and Emelie Blum, wife of Minnesota Wild defenseman Jonathon Blum.

Scrivens was featured in the first season and is not set to return for the second.

== Personal life ==
Scrivens was born in Camarillo, California on June 19, 1988. She attended Rio Mesa High School in Camarillo, where she captained a girls' tennis team, lettering four times in doubles. She was named "Most Valuable Player" in her senior season. Scrivens completed a Bachelor of Science degree in Communication and Business at Cornell University in 2010 and a Postgraduate Certificate in Public Relations at Humber College in 2014. Scrivens is married to fellow goaltender Ben Scrivens. The couple met at Cornell University while playing hockey. The couple have lived in Toronto and Los Angeles while Ben played for the Maple Leafs and the Kings before settling in Edmonton.
