= Maripier Morin =

Canadian television presenter and businesswoman

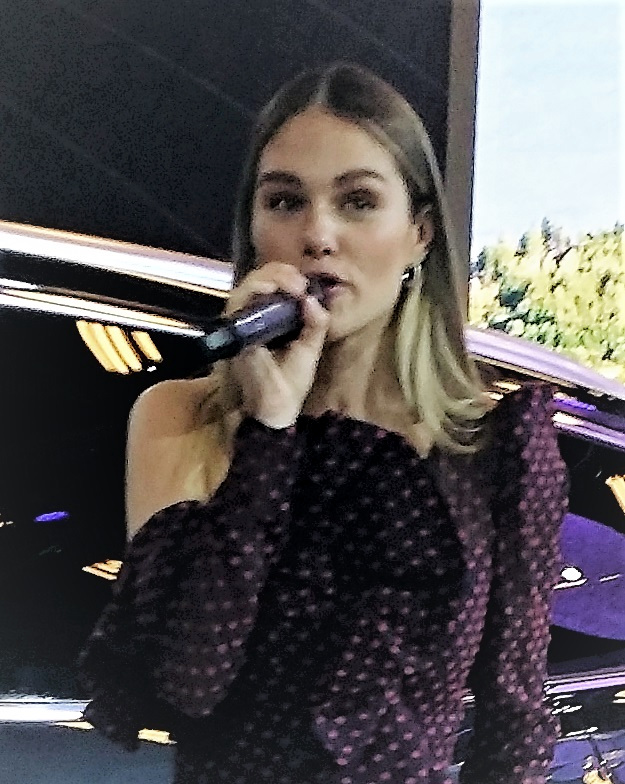
- Morin in 2019
- Born: July 7, 1986 (age 40); Rivière-du-Loup, Quebec, Canada
- Occupations: Television presenter, businesswoman, actress
- Years active: 2006–present
- Spouse: Brandon Prust (m. 2017; sep. 2019)

Maripier Morin (born July 7, 1986) is a Canadian television presenter, businesswoman and actress.

== Career ==
=== Early career (2006–2009) ===
In 2006, Morin made her first appearance on television as a participant in the reality series Occupation Double. Following her elimination, she appeared as a model on Le Banquier, the Quebec adaptation of Deal or No Deal. At the same time, she became a presenter for TVA, appearing on Sucré salé, Salut Bonjour Week-end and Deux Filles le matin.

=== V, Code F and business ventures (2010-2014) ===
In 2010, Morin joined the V network as host of the web series Planète V and after a few months became a reporter for C'est extra.

In 2012, she became a reporter on cultural events on the show District V. In the fall of 2012, she became anchor of Ça commence bien, the V network's morning show, where she also reported on the artistic world and the weather.

After the end of the series District V and changes to Ça commence bien in 2014, V made her co-host of Ménage à trois along with Patrick Langlois. The same year, she launched a ready-to-drink cocktail collection, UNIK. Besides her appearances on V, she was hired by Vrak for the show Code F.

=== Return to TVA, Hockey Wives and other projects (2015–2017) ===
In 2015, Morin returned to reality TV, appearing on the W Network's Hockey Wives. The same year, she became the principal spokesperson for Revlon in Quebec and appeared in the music video for Simple Plan's "I Don't Wanna Go to Bed".

In the summer of 2015, she returned to TVA to join the show Faites comme chez vous.

In 2016, she presented three episodes of the Évasion network travel series 99 envies d'évasion in New York, Miami and San Francisco. She also became host of her own talk show Maripier! on Z and La Voix Junior on TVA.

In 2017, she joined Accès Illimité as a reporter and launcher her own website and a lingerie line in collaboration with the Montreal brand Blush.

=== Forays into film and other projects (2018–present) ===
In 2018, Morin was chosen to host Face au Mur, the Quebec adaptation of quiz show The Wall. She was also chosen to host the 2018 Gala Artis with Jean-Philippe Dion and was also nominated in two categories at the same event.

In the same year, she made her first film appearance, starring in Denys Arcand's The Fall of the American Empire (La chute de l'empire américain). During an appearance he made with Morin on Tout le monde en parle, Arcand said that he had met Morin at the Canadian Open and resumed contact with her a few years later to offer her a role in his film.

In 2019, Morin hosted the documentary series Mais Pourquoi?, discussing subjects such as nudity, video games, bodybuilding, religion and egg freezing, as well as the variety show Studio G. She also made a film appearance in Jexi, dubbing over the voice of Rose Byrne. She took the lead role of Sophie Taylor in crime drama series La Faille for two seasons (2019, 2021).

She starred in the 2022 film Arlette.

== Public image and controversy ==
=== Experience on Occupation Double ===
As a guest on Les Enfants de la Télé, Morin broke down in tears after watching a clip of herself on Occupation Double and, 11 years after her initial appearance, the pain she experienced during the show, by, for example, being described as the "bitch of the third season":

When I left, I was excessively ashamed of myself. I thought that my parents were going to disown me, that my brothers wouldn't talk to me anymore. My mother told me "We love you, and that will never change." When you leave a show like that, where you have the impression that everyone hates you, that's just what you need to hear.

=== Sexual assault allegations ===
On July 7, 2020, Safia Nolin accused Morin of having sexually assaulted and verbally harassed her one night at a bar in 2018. Nolin alleged that Morin touched her, bit her thigh and made sexually explicit and racist statements. Morin apologized but did not respond to the specific allegation that she had made racist statements. Nolin, however, did not file a complaint, despite having a photograph of the bite marks on her thigh. BonLook, Blush and Buick announced that they would cut ties with Morin. Morin announced that she would put her career on pause. A number of videos featuring Morin were removed from television networks' websites.

In May 2021, Morin made her first media appearance since the allegations on Tout le monde en parle. She publicly apologized to five victims for physical aggression, unsolicited groping and racist comments made between 2017 and 2020. Morin said she had gone through a three-month rehabilitation program for her alcohol dependency. In December 2021, Morin publicly admitted being addicted to cocaine on the first episode of the podcast Un espresso avec Angelo. At the time of her announcement, she said that she had abstained from using cocaine for one year and four months.

== Personal life ==
Morin began dating hockey player Brandon Prust in 2010. They were engaged in 2015 and married in 2017 before announcing their separation in 2019. Morin has been coupled with Jean-Philippe Perras since April 2020. She has ADHD and takes medication for the condition.
