= Hockey Wives =

Canadian documentary television series

- Genre: Documentary
- Starring: Maripier Morin; Emilie Blum; Martine Auclair-Vlasic; Erica Lundmark; Vanessa Vandal; Catherine Laflamme
- Country of origin: Canada
- Original language: English
- No. of seasons: 3
- No. of episodes: 33

Production
- Executive producers: Julie Bristow; Megan Sanchez-Warner
- Producer: Christie Callan-Jones
- Running time: 60 mins
- Production company: Bristow Global Media

Original release
- Network: W Network
- Release: March 18, 2015 – present

Hockey Wives is a Canadian documentary television series which debuted on March 18, 2015, on the W Network. In Québec, the series debuted on September 12, 2015, on the Séries+ (Mariées au hockey). The series follows a group of wives and girlfriends of professional hockey players, as they balance the highs and lows of the hockey world, their personal and social lives.

On May 5, 2015, the network announced that the series had been renewed for a second season.

On October 13, 2016, W confirmed the renewal for a third season, and on March 20, 2017, the full cast was revealed.

Season three premiered on April 19, 2017.

== Overview ==
Production for the first season of Hockey Wives was announced on July 17, 2014, in a press release issued by W Network's parent company, Corus Entertainment.

The cast of the third season includes:

- Maripier Morin (wife of Nürnberg Ice Tigers forward Brandon Prust)
- Emilie Blum (wife of Admiral Vladivostok defenseman Jonathon Blum)
- Martine Auclair Vlasic (wife of San Jose Sharks defenseman Marc-Édouard Vlasic)
- Erica Lundmark (wife of Klagenfurt Athletic Sports Club forward Jamie Lundmark)
- Vanessa Vandal (girlfriend of St. Louis Blues forward David Perron)
- Catherine Laflamme (wife of Pittsburgh Penguins defenseman Kris Letang)

Although based in cities all over the world, during the course of the professional hockey season their lives intersect and affect one another's. From wives who are new to the game, to those whose partners are Stanley Cup winning superstars or are nearing retirement, the women form a team of their own to support and encourage each other through personal and professional highs and lows.

== Reception ==
Following the series premiere in March 2015, the show quickly became the most watched series on W Network that year, with record ratings for the broadcaster. In addition, episodes of the series ranked as the top reality series on iTunes Canada after their initial broadcast.

== Timeline of Hockey Wives ==
Hockey Wives	Seasons		
Hockey Wives	1	2	3
Maripier Morin (wife of Brandon Prust)	Yes		
Emilie Blum (wife of Jonathon Blum)	Yes		Yes
Martine Auclair-Vlasic (wife of Marc-Édouard Vlasic)			Yes
Erica Lundmark (wife of Jamie Lundmark)			Yes
Vanessa Vandal (girlfriend of David Perron)			Yes
Catherine Laflamme (wife of Kris Letang)			Yes
Noureen DeWulf (wife of Ryan Miller)	Yes		
Martine Forget (wife of Jonathan Bernier)	Yes		
Kodette LaBarbera (wife of Jason LaBarbera)	Yes		
Tiffany Parros (wife of George Parros)	Yes		
Keshia Chanté (girlfriend of Ray Emery)		Yes	
Paige Getzlaf (wife of Ryan Getzlaf)		Yes	
Angela Price (wife of Carey Price)		Yes	
Rhianna Weaver (wife of Mike Weaver)		Yes	
Taylor Winnik (wife of Daniel Winnik)		Yes	
Ashley Booth (wife of David Booth)		Yes	
Nicole Brown (wife of Dustin Brown)	Yes		
Brijet Whitney (wife of Ray Whitney)	Yes		
Jenny Scrivens (wife of Ben Scrivens)	Yes		
Wendy Tippett (wife of Dave Tippett)	Yes		

== Episode list ==
Season	Episode	Title	Originally Aired
1	1	Married to the Game	March 18, 2015
1	2	Home Fire Burnout	March 25, 2015
1	3	The Breakout Play	April 1, 2015
1	4	Stick handling a Puck	April 8, 2015
1	5	Relationship on Ice	April 15, 2015
1	6	Love & Loathing in LA	April 22, 2015
1	7	Family Skate	April 29, 2015
1	8	Pop Ups and Power Plays	May 6, 2015
2	1	Still In The Game	October 28, 2015
2	2	Hockey's Out For The Summer	November 4, 2015
2	3	Free Agency Frenzy	November 11, 2015
2	4	Let the Good Times Roll	November 18, 2015
2	5	The Off-Ice Plays	November 25, 2015
2	6	The Long Goodbye	March 17, 2016
2	7	Home Sweet Opener	March 24, 2016
2	8	Family Face-off	March 31, 2016
2	9	Breakaways	April 7, 2016
2	10	New York & New Beginnings	April 14, 2016
2	11	Back to Basics	April 21, 2016
2	12	Home for the Holidays	April 28, 2016
2	13	Time-Out	May 5, 2016
2	14	Pucks and Palm Trees	May 11, 2016
2	15	Home Is Where the Hockey Is	May 18, 2016
2	16	Off-Ice Goals	May 25, 2016
3	1	We Are The Champions	April 19, 2017
3	2	On Top Of The World	April 26, 2017
3	3	The Puck Stops Here	May 3, 2017
3	4	Make or Break	May 10, 2017
3	5	From Russia With Love	May 17, 2017
3	6	Between the Pipes	May 24, 2017
3	7	Home for the Holidays	May 31, 2017
3	8	On Thin Ice	June 7, 2017
3	9	Down to the Wire	June 14, 2017
