= Arlette (2022 film) =

2022 Canadian film

- Film poster
- Directed by: Mariloup Wolfe
- Written by: Marie Vien
- Produced by: Valérie d'Auteuil; André Rouleau
- Starring: Maripier Morin; Gilbert Sicotte; David La Haye
- Cinematography: Yves Bélanger
- Edited by: Cédric Roussy
- Music by: Jean-Phi Goncalves
- Production company: Caramel Film
- Release date: August 5, 2022
- Running time: 118 minutes
- Country: Canada
- Language: French

Arlette is a 2022 Canadian political satire comedy-drama film, directed by Mariloup Wolfe. The film stars Maripier Morin.

The film's cast also includes Claudia Ferri, Patrick Caux, Sandrine Bisson, Lara Fabian, Alex Bisping, Paul Ahmarani, Alexandre Nachi, Benoît Brière, Alexandrine Agostini, Kathleen Fortin, Pascal Cameron, Daniel Gosselin, Sophie Caron, Gabriel Dagenais and Carmen Sylvestre.

The film opened theatrically in Quebec on August 5, 2022. It was also screened in France at the Angoulême Francophone Film Festival on August 24.

== Plot ==
Arlette Saint-Amour is a fashion magazine editor who is invited by the Premier of Quebec (Gilbert Sicotte) to join the cabinet as minister of culture, despite her lack of political experience; her unconventional approach to politics reinvigorates the public's engagement with arts and culture, but places her in the crosshairs of finance minister Paul Girouard (David La Haye), who wants to cut $100 million from her departmental budget.

== Production ==
Morin's casting in her first major starring role since having her career disrupted in 2020 by public accusations of verbal and sexual harassment fueled by cocaine addiction was controversial. Wolfe noted that the film had been in development for several years and Morin had already been cast by a previous director before the allegations became public, and stated that when she took over the project she auditioned several other actresses but felt that Morin was still the right choice. She further asserted that Morin's status as an actress trying to reestablish her career following a scandal fit in with the film's themes of an ambitious but inexperienced politician butting heads with the establishment.

Many scenes in the film were shot in the real National Assembly of Quebec.

== Critical response ==
Anne-Frédérique Hébert-Dolbec of Le Devoir rated the film two and a half stars, writing that it was difficult to separate the film from Morin's public image issues.
