= Elena Orlando =

American ice hockey player

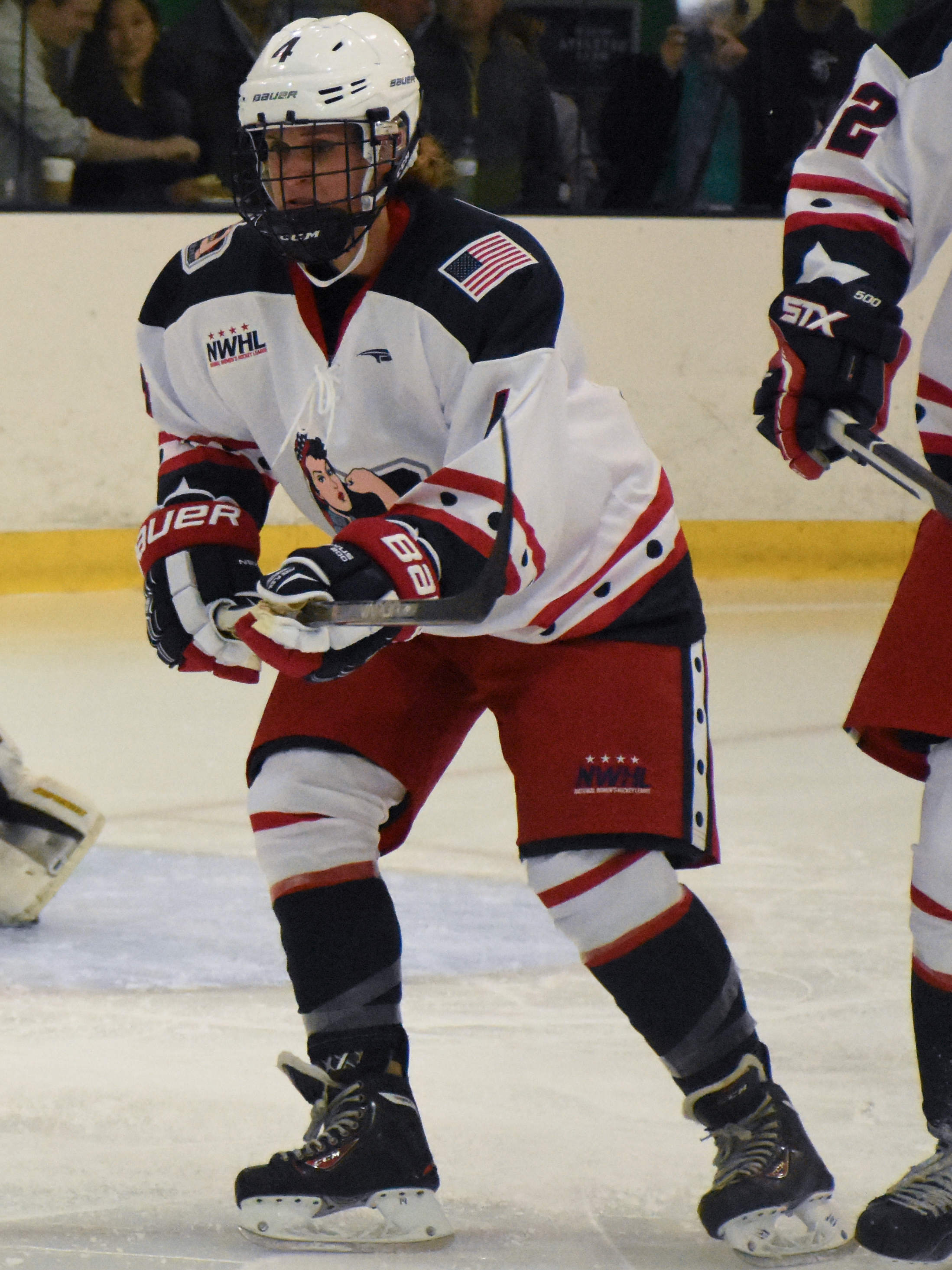
- Orlando with the New York Riveters in 2015
- Born: June 15, 1992 (age 33); San Jose, California, United States
- Height: 5 ft 7 in (170 cm)
- Position: Defense
- Shot: Left
- Played for: Buffalo Beauts; Connecticut Whale; New York Riveters; Sundsvall-Timrå; Quinnipiac Bobcats
- Playing career: 2010–2022

Elena Orlando (born June 15, 1992) is an American ice hockey defenseman. She most recently played in the Premier Hockey Federation (PHF) with the Buffalo Beauts during the 2021–22 season. Having played in the PHF since its inaugural 2015–16 season, she was one of five players to have recorded more than 100 regular season games played at the conclusion of the 2021–22 season.

== Playing career ==
Growing up in California, Orlando originally began playing roller hockey until an ice rink was built in her neighborhood, at which point she switched to ice hockey along with her brother.

In high school, she attended Shattuck-Saint Mary's, where she played as both a forward and a defender and won the national championship in 2009. She was invited to the USA Hockey national development camp in 2008 and 2009.

From 2010 to 2014, she attended Quinnipiac University and played with the Quinnipiac Bobcats, scoring 11 points in 85 NCAA Division I games. She scored her first NCAA goal in a 2–1 defeat to the Colgate Raiders on October 30, 2010. At Quinnipiac, she also played for the university's women's rugby programme.

After graduating, she signed with IF Sundsvall Hockey in the Swedish Women's Hockey League (then known as Riksserien). She would pick up 2 points in 5 games with Sundsvall, adding another 9 points in 14 relegation playoff games as the club managed to save its top-flight spot.

After the National Women's Hockey League (NWHL; rebranded as PHF in 2021) was founded by Dani Rylan in 2015, she returned to North America to sign with the New York Riveters on a $10,000 contract. She would only play one season with the Riveters, picking up one assist in seventeen games, before signing a $12,000 contract with the Connecticut Whale. Orlando went on to play with the Whale for five consecutive seasons, playing a total of 72 games with the team, and was the recipient of a NWHL Foundation Award in 2017.

While serving as an alternate captain of the Whale during the 2019–20 NWHL season, she picked up 3 assists in 24 regular season games, more than doubling her career total, and was named to Team Packer for the 2020 NWHL All-Star Game. She recorded an additional 2 points with the Whale in the four regular season games of the 2020–21 season, which was dramatically shortened due to the COVID-19 pandemic.

After half a decade with the Whale, Orlando signed with the Buffalo Beauts for the 2021–22 season. Continuing to live in Connecticut, she made the more than 310 mi (500 km) commute to Buffalo for practices and home games all season, managing to not miss a single game. In recognition of her perseverance and dedication to the sport, she received the Denna Laing Award (also called the PHF Perseverance Award) in 2022.

== Personal life ==
Outside of hockey, Orlando works as a nurse.

== Career statistics ==
			Regular Season					Playoffs
Season	Team	League	GP	G	A	Pts	PIM	GP	G	A	Pts	PIM
2014–15	IF Sundsvall Hockey	Riksserien	5	1	1	2	4	-	-	-	-	-
2015–16	New York Riveters	NWHL	17	0	1	1	12	2	0	0	0	4
2016-17	Connecticut Whale	NWHL	12	0	0	0	4	-	-	-	-	-
2017-18	Connecticut Whale	NWHL	16	0	1	1	2	1	0	0	0	0
2018-19	Connecticut Whale	NWHL	16	0	0	0	4	1	0	0	0	2
2019-20	Connecticut Whale	NWHL	24	0	3	3	12	2	0	1	1	0
2020-21	Connecticut Whale	NWHL	4	0	2	2	2	1	0	0	0	0
2021-22	Buffalo Beauts	PHF	20	0	0	0	4	2	0	0	0	0
PHF totals			109	0	7	7	40	8	0	1	1	6
