= Brooke Ammerman =

American ice hockey player

Brooke Reimer
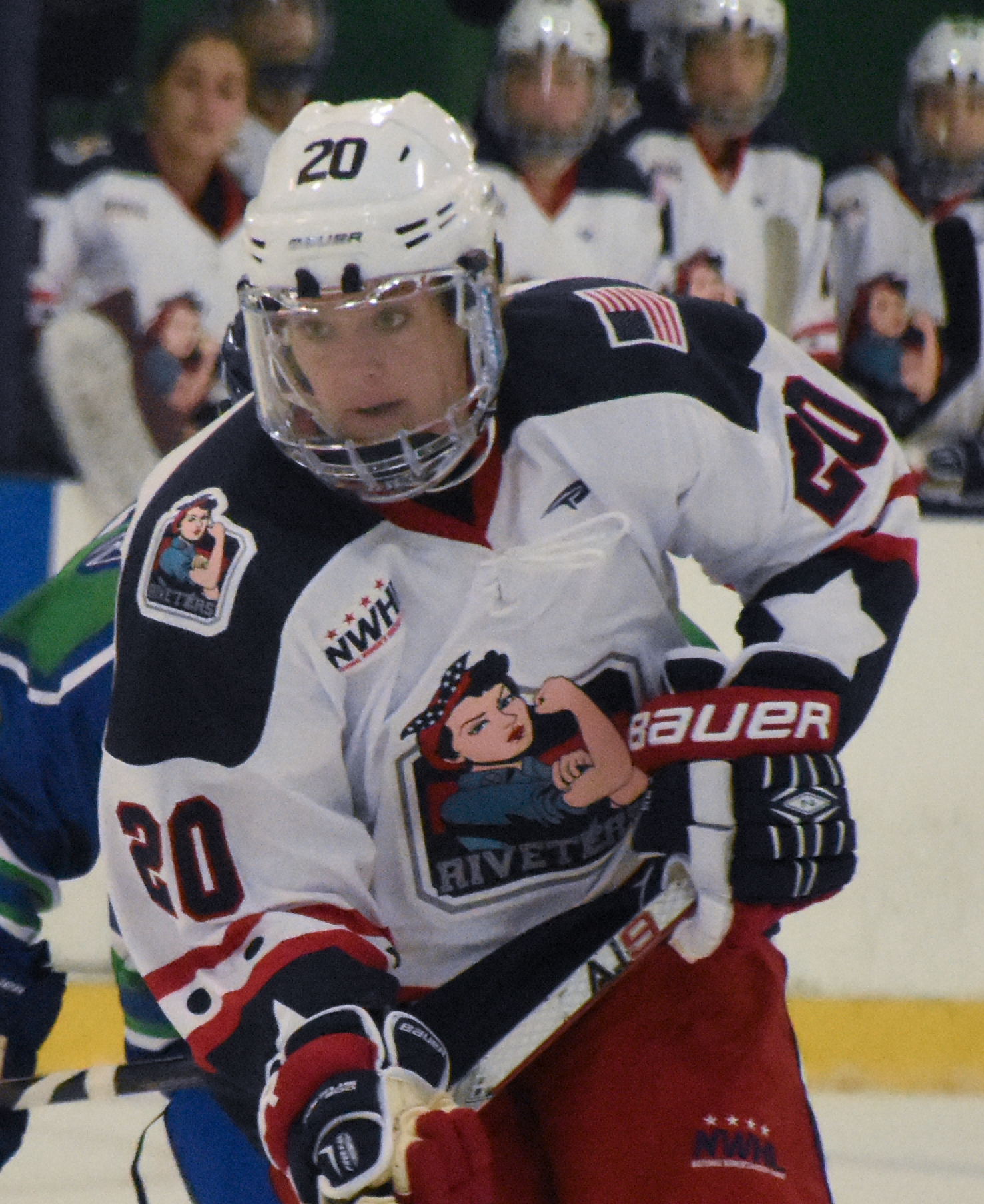
- Reimer with the New York Riveters in 2015
- Born: July 13, 1990 (age 34); Teaneck, New Jersey, United States
- Height: 175 cm (5 ft 9 in)
- Position: Forward
- Shot: Right
- Played for: ERC Ingolstadt (DFEL); Metropolitan Riveters (NWHL); ESC Planegg (DFEL); Wisconsin Badgers (NCAA)
- National team: United States
- Playing career: 2008–2018

Brooke Reimer (née Ammerman; born July 13, 1990) is an American retired ice hockey forward. She scored the first goal in Metropolitan Riveters franchise history in the inaugural game of the National Women's Hockey League, on October 11, 2015.

== Playing career ==
Born in Teaneck, New Jersey, Ammerman Reimer was raised in River Vale, New Jersey. In the absence of interscholastic high school leagues for girls, she briefly played on the boys ice hockey team at Pascack Valley High School.

Reimer played four seasons with the Wisconsin Badgers, 2008–2012, and scored 214 points in 152 games in that period. She won two NCAA championships with the Badgers and was twice named to the NCAA Frozen Four All-Tournament Team. She is the fourth-highest scorer in the programme's history, and was named 2010 WCHA Preseason Player of the Year.

After graduating, she signed with the German team ESC Planegg and played the 2013–14 and 2014–15 IIHF European Women's Champions Cup, as well as the 2014–15 DFEL season, with the team.

Upon the creation of the NWHL in 2015, she signed with the Metropolitan Riveters for the 2015–16 season. She scored the franchise's first-ever goal off of an assist from Lyudmila Belyakova in the inaugural game of the NWHL. The goal was the third goal scored in league history and Belyakova's assist was the first point earned by a European player. With the Riveters, Reimer posted 14 points in 15 regular season games and one point in two playoff games.

After one season with the Riveters, Reimer returned to Germany. She signed with the ERC Ingolstadt women's team for the 2017–18 DFEL season. Her husband, Jochem, signed with the ERC Ingolstadt men's team in 2017 also.

=== International ===
Reimer won a gold medal with the US national U18 team at the 2008 IIHF World Women's U18 Championship, where she tallied 10 points in 5 games. She was one of 41 players invited to tryout for the Team USA squad for the 2010 Olympics, but was cut from the roster on August 24, 2009.

== Personal life ==
She is married to German ice hockey goaltender Jochen Reimer. Her younger sister, Brittany, also played hockey with the Wisconsin Badgers program and represented the United States at the IIHF World Women's U18 Championship in 2009 and 2010.
