= Brandon Prust =

Canadian ice hockey player (born 1984)

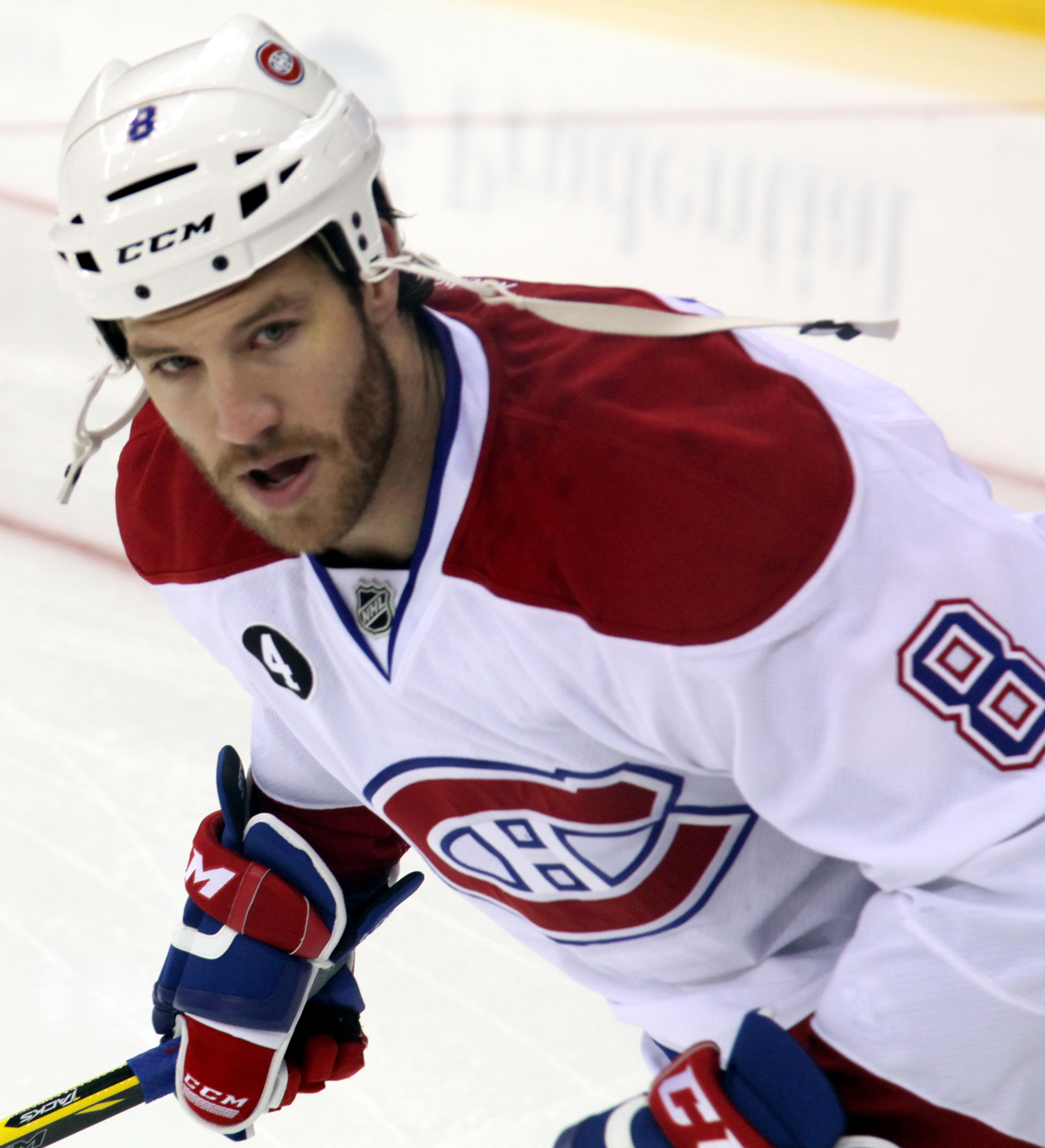
- Prust with the Montreal Canadiens in 2015
- Born: March 16, 1984 (age 42) London, Ontario, Canada
- Height: 5 ft 11 in (180 cm)
- Weight: 195 lb (88 kg; 13 st 13 lb)
- Position: Left wing
- Shot: Left
- Played for: Calgary Flames; Phoenix Coyotes; New York Rangers; Montreal Canadiens; Vancouver Canucks; Thomas Sabo Ice Tigers
- NHL draft: 70th overall, 2004; Calgary Flames
- Playing career: 2005–2017

Brandon Raymond James Prust (born March 16, 1984) is a Canadian former professional ice hockey winger. He was selected in the third round, 70th overall, by the Calgary Flames of the National Hockey League (NHL) in the 2004 NHL entry draft. Prust also played for the Phoenix Coyotes, New York Rangers, Montreal Canadiens and Vancouver Canucks, most notably in the role as an enforcer.

He served as head coach of the London Nationals of the Greater Ontario Junior Hockey League (GOJHL) until December 26, 2025 when he was terminated without explanation by Nationals owner Dean Pomerleau.

== Playing career ==
=== Junior ===
Prust played three seasons of major junior hockey with his hometown London Knights of the Ontario Hockey League (OHL). During his junior career, he won an OHL and Memorial Cup Championship. A native of Thorndale, Ontario, Prust was a walk-on during the Knights' open tryouts, having been bypassed in the OHL Priority Selection Draft.

=== Professional ===
Prust was drafted by the Calgary Flames in the third round, 70th overall, at the 2004 NHL entry draft. During the midst of the 2004–05 NHL lockout, he was sent back down to London to play his final OHL season. After spending the following season with the Omaha Ak-Sar-Ben Knights of the American Hockey League (AHL), Prust made his NHL debut on November 1, 2006, against the Detroit Red Wings.

Midway through the 2008–09 season, Prust would be sidelined with injury after suffering a broken jaw due to being elbowed by Cam Janssen of the St. Louis Blues. On March 4, 2009, Prust was traded, along with Matthew Lombardi and a 2009 first-round draft pick, to the Phoenix Coyotes in exchange for Olli Jokinen, and was then traded back to Calgary in exchange for Jim Vandermeer on June 27.

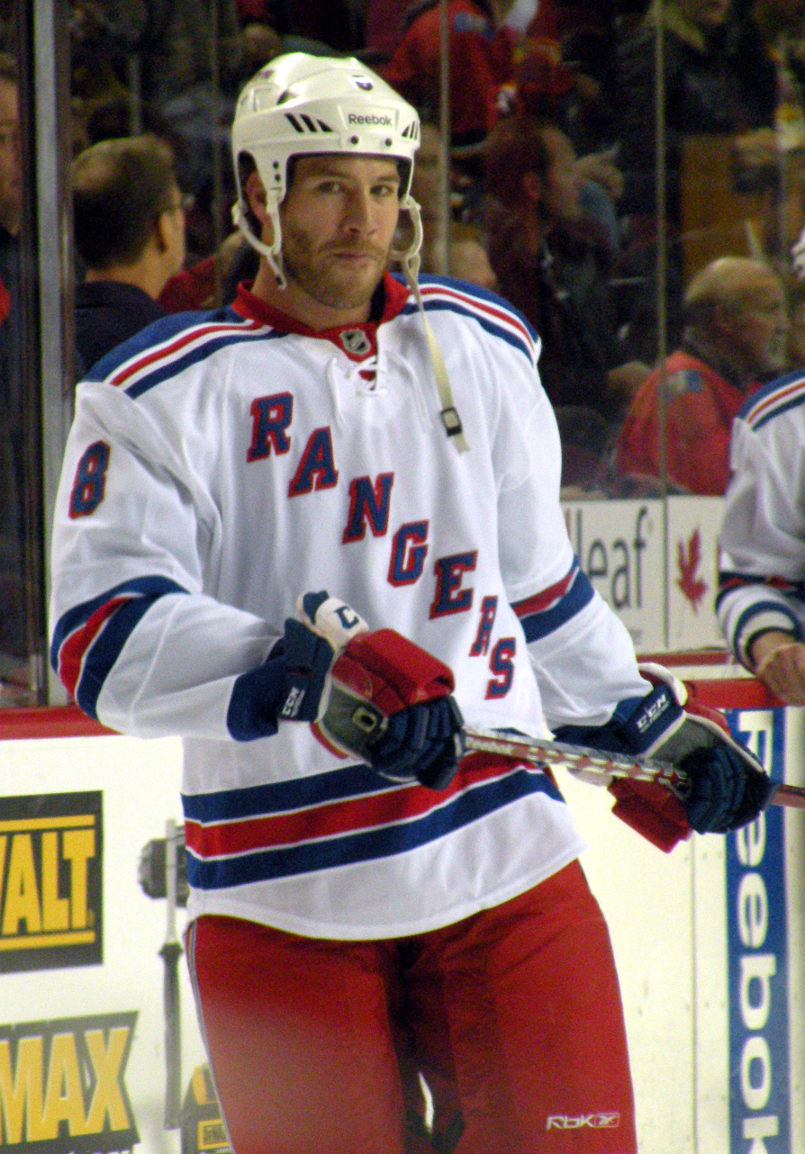
Prust as a Ranger in October 2011.

On February 1, 2010, Prust (along with Jokinen) were traded to the New York Rangers in exchange for Aleš Kotalík and Chris Higgins. Following the conclusion of the 2009–10.season, the Rangers re-signed Prust to a two-year, $1.6 million contract on July 2.

In the 2010–11 season, Prust, a fourth-line utility player and occasional enforcer, was one of only seven NHL players to score at least ten goals as well as engage in at least ten fights. He was awarded the Steven McDonald Extra Effort Award at the end of the season, given to the Rangers player who "goes above and beyond the call of duty" as voted on by the fans.

During the 2012 NHL Winter Classic, which took place at Citizens Bank Park, on January 2, 2012, Prust would post two assists in a 3–2 Rangers win. Overall, he proved to be a valuable member of the Rangers' penalty kill during his tenure there. As an unrestricted free agent following the 2011–12 season, Prust signed a four-year, $10 million contract with the Montreal Canadiens on July 1, 2012.

After the start of the lockout-shortened 2012–13 season, Prust scored his first goal as a Canadien against Martin Brodeur of the New Jersey Devils on January 27, 2013. Prust was awarded the Jacques Beauchamp Molson Trophy at the end of the regular season, an award voted on by various members of the Montreal media to honour the team's unsung hero.

During the 2014 Eastern Conference Finals against his former team, the New York Rangers, Prust was suspended for two games following a first period hit on forward Derek Stepan in Game 3. Stepan suffered a broken jaw on the play and subsequently missed Game 4.

On July 1, 2015, Prust was traded to the Vancouver Canucks for Zack Kassian and Vancouver's 5th round draft pick in the 2016 NHL entry draft. Prust struggled with the Canucks, putting up the fewest points since his rookie campaign. On February 2, 2016, he was waived by the Canucks and, subsequently, reassigned to the Canucks' AHL affiliate, the Utica Comets. On March 10, he returned to his home in London, ON, and was taken off the roster due to an ankle injury. After the Canucks opted not to re-sign him following season's end, Prust became an unrestricted free agent yet again on July 1, 2016.

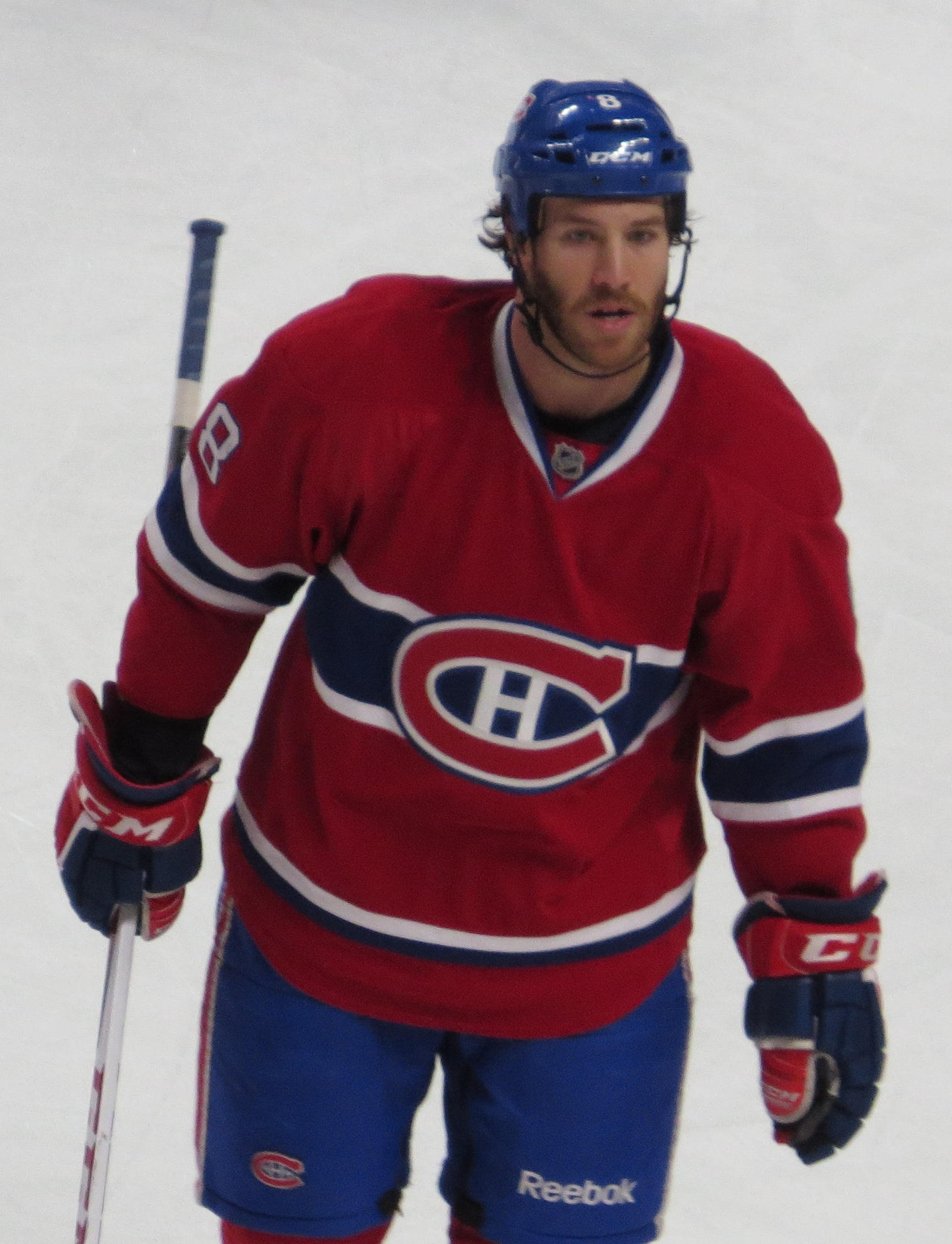
Prust with Montreal in January 2013.

Due to his ankle injury, teams were unwilling to give Prust a contract, with concerns continuing to be raised over his foot speed and ankle itself. Going unsigned for the duration of the summer, he agreed to a professional tryout (PTO) contract with the Toronto Maple Leafs on August 22, 2016. Prust's main reason for signing the tryout was to fulfill his childhood dream of playing for the Maple Leafs, the team he grew up cheering for. After an unremarkable training camp, along with stiff competition for role players on the Leafs roster, he was released by the team on October 11, 2016, He then embarked on his first overseas stint in late November 2016 after signing with the Thomas Sabo Ice Tigers of the German top-flight Deutsche Eishockey Liga (DEL). In the 2016–17 season, Prust added a needed physical presence to the Ice Tigers, contributing 8 points in 29 games with the team.

Vying for another attempt at an NHL comeback, Prust signed a PTO contract to attend the Los Angeles Kings' training camp prior to the 2017–18 season. After attending camp for 10 days, Prust, along with fellow winger Shane Harper, were the first to be released from their PTOs on September 25, 2017.

== Post-playing career ==
Although he did not formally announce his retirement from professional hockey, Prust signalled the conclusion of his 12-year playing career in joining his former major junior club, the London Knights, as a coach on November 29, 2017.

On June 4, 2018, via Instagram, Prust announced that he had begun working at the London, Ontario based financial guidance firm Navigator Financial. He likewise opened a local fitness centre known as "BP8 Fitness" in December 2023.

On April 26, 2024, Prust was named head coach of the Greater Ontario Junior Hockey League (GOJHL)'s London Nationals, the team whom he started his junior hockey career with.

== Personal life ==
Prust grew up in London, Ontario, where he attended Regina Mundi Catholic College. As a youth, his favourite team was the Toronto Maple Leafs, and his favourite player was Wendel Clark, after whom he tried to model his own game.

Prust has an uncle who was a Broadway actor. His interests outside of hockey include golf and watching baseball.

Prust began dating French-Canadian TV host Maripier Morin in 2010. On June 22, 2015, the couple got engaged, and married in 2017. Morin had been a cast member on three seasons of the Canadian reality series Hockey Wives and is a popular host of her own talk show in Quebec, as well as starring in her first feature-length film. It was announced in September 2019 that the couple had separated.

In 2020 Prust's charitable foundation launched a campaign to raise money for families of sick children to find accommodations in London during the COVID-19 pandemic in Ontario. Prust was an outspoken opponent of mandates and "vaccine passport" policies related to COVID-19 vaccines. Prust was criticized after, in an August 2021 Twitter exchange related to vaccines, he replied to a woman with a post declaring that he hoped she would be subjected to forced prostitution. Prust apologized for this. Prust had, for a time leading up to this, generated controversy for polarizing and combative Twitter exchanges on subjects such as racial relations and the 2020 United States presidential election (in which he was opposed to the candidacy of Democrat Joe Biden).

== Career statistics ==
			Regular season					Playoffs
Season	Team	League	GP	G	A	Pts	PIM	GP	G	A	Pts	PIM
2001–02	London Nationals	WOHL	52	17	35	52	38	—	—	—	—	—
2002–03	London Nationals	WOHL	6	2	3	5	0	—	—	—	—	—
2002–03	London Knights	OHL	65	12	17	29	94	14	2	1	3	21
2003–04	London Knights	OHL	64	19	33	52	269	15	7	13	20	33
2004–05	London Knights	OHL	48	10	20	30	174	15	3	5	8	71
2005–06	Omaha Ak-Sar-Ben Knights	AHL	79	12	14	26	249	—	—	—	—	—
2006–07	Omaha Ak-Sar-Ben Knights	AHL	63	17	10	27	211	6	0	3	3	20
2006–07	Calgary Flames	NHL	10	0	0	0	25	—	—	—	—	—
2007–08	Quad City Flames	AHL	79	10	27	37	248	—	—	—	—	—
2008–09	Calgary Flames	NHL	25	1	1	2	79	—	—	—	—	—
2008–09	Phoenix Coyotes	NHL	11	0	1	1	29	—	—	—	—	—
2009–10	Calgary Flames	NHL	43	1	4	5	98	—	—	—	—	—
2009–10	New York Rangers	NHL	26	4	5	9	65	—	—	—	—	—
2010–11	New York Rangers	NHL	82	13	16	29	160	5	0	1	1	4
2011–12	New York Rangers	NHL	82	5	12	17	156	19	1	1	2	31
2012–13	Montreal Canadiens	NHL	38	5	9	14	110	4	0	1	1	14
2013–14	Montreal Canadiens	NHL	52	6	7	13	121	13	0	2	2	32
2014–15	Montreal Canadiens	NHL	82	4	14	18	134	12	1	3	4	35
2015–16	Vancouver Canucks	NHL	35	1	6	7	59	—	—	—	—	—
2015–16	Utica Comets	AHL	9	1	6	7	5	—	—	—	—	—
2016–17	Thomas Sabo Ice Tigers	DEL	29	3	5	8	67	11	2	4	6	51
AHL totals			230	40	57	97	758	6	0	3	3	20
NHL totals			486	40	75	115	1036	53	2	8	10	116

== Awards and honours ==
Award	Year	Ref
CHL
Memorial Cup champion	2005	
OHL
J. Ross Robertson Cup champion	2005	
