= Sydney Kidd =

Canadian ice hockey player

- Born: October 30, 1992 (age 32); Sundridge, Ontario, Canada
- Height: 5 ft 8 in (173 cm)
- Position: Forward/Defence
- Shoots: Left
- CWHL team Former teams: Toronto Furies; Metropolitan Riveters
- Playing career: 2015–present

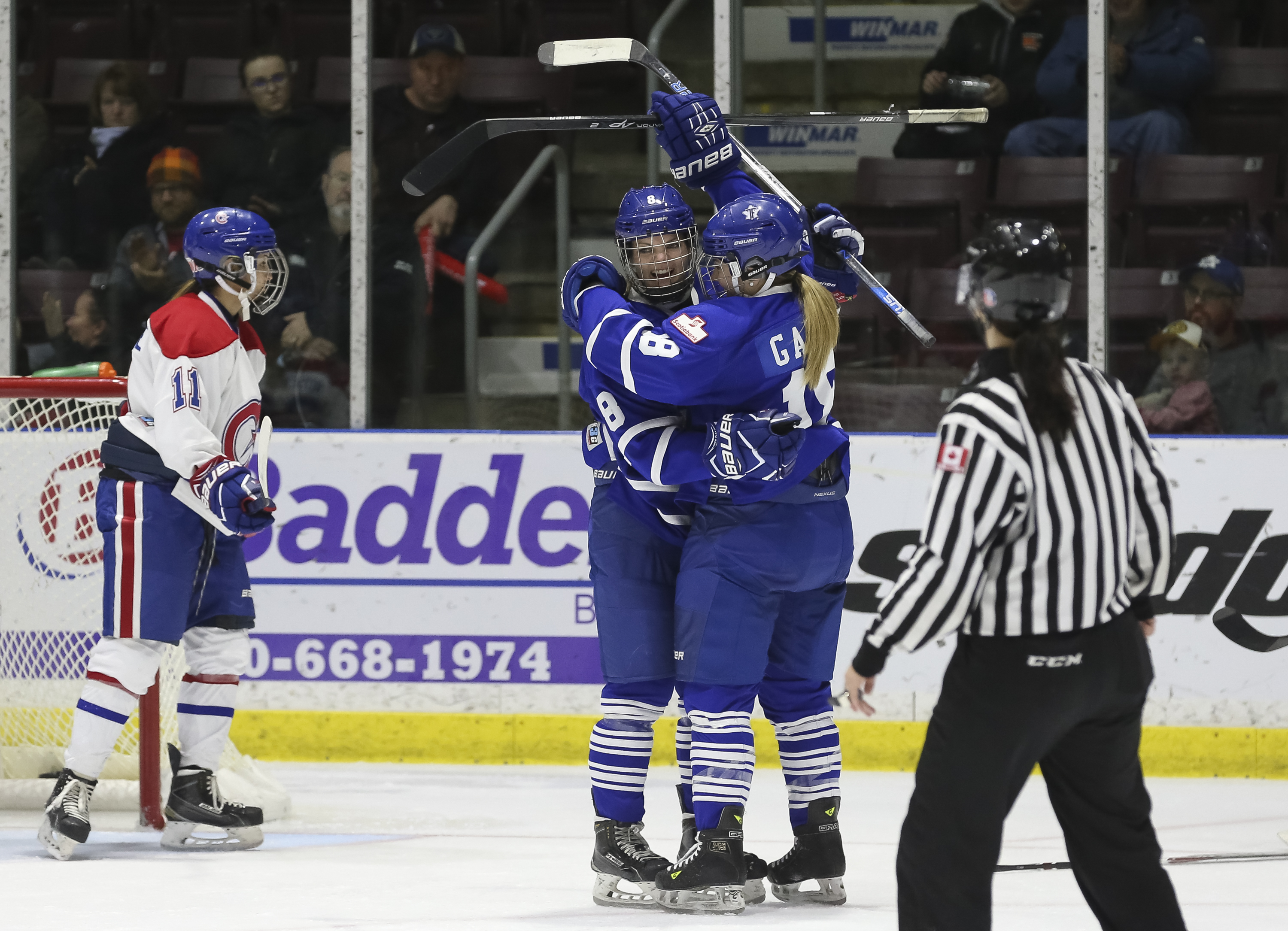
Sydney Kidd celebrates with teammate after scoring her first CWHL goal with the Toronto Furies.

Sydney Kidd (born October 30, 1992) is a Canadian professional ice hockey player for the Toronto Furies of the Canadian Women's Hockey League (CWHL). Kidd was an inaugural member of the (formerly) New York Riveters of the NWHL in 2015.

== Personal life ==
Kidd played collegiate-level women's ice hockey for the University of Western Ontario for five years between 2010 and 2015.

Kidd completed a master's degree in International Business at the prestigious Ivey Business School, winning a national title with the Western University Mustangs in 2015.

== Playing career ==
=== NWHL ===
Kidd joined the New York Riveters as for the NWHL's inaugural 2015/16 season, with a reported $15,000 salary. Due to delays caused by work visa issues, Kidd played her first game with the team on November 15, 2015.

In November 2016, it was reported that Kidd may have joined the Riveters for the 2016/17 season as a practice player.

=== CWHL ===
In 2017, Kidd was drafted in the 3rd round by the Toronto Furies of the Canadian Women's Hockey League. Kidd currently plays as a forward for the CWHL team across North America and China.
