= Meghan Fardelmann =

US-American ice hockey player (born 1987)

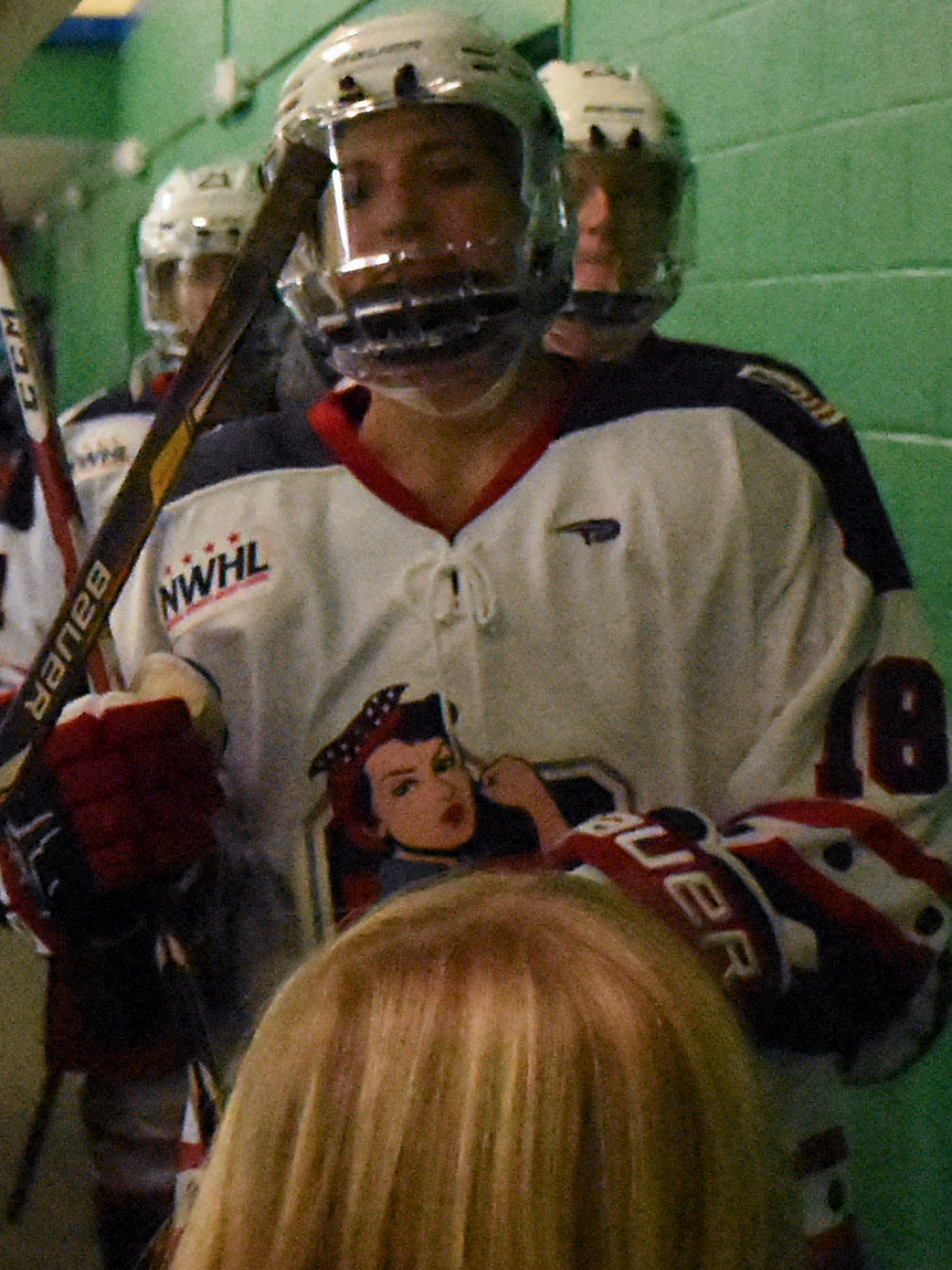
- Fardelmann with the New York Riveters in October 2015
- Born: June 7, 1987 (age 38) Lansing, Kansas, US
- Height: 5 ft 8 in (173 cm)
- Position: Center
- Played for: DEC Salzburg Eagles; New York Riveters
- Coached for: DEC Salzburg Eagles
- Playing career: 2005–2016
- Coaching career: 2009–2011

Meghan Fardelmann (born 7 June 1987) is an American retired professional ice hockey forward. She played in the inaugural season of the National Women's Hockey League (NWHL) with the New York Riveters.

== Playing career ==
Fardelmann started playing ice hockey at the age of four. She played for an all-girls team in a boys league as a ten year old. She played four seasons of ice hockey at Culver Academy during high school.

=== College ===
Fardelmann played her college ice hockey career with the Boston College Eagles women's ice hockey program during 2005 to 2009. She scored 99 points in 137 games and helped the Eagles to the 2007 Frozen Four, the first time the Eagles had qualified for the national tournament.

=== Professional ===
Fardelmann began her professional career in Europe during the 2009–10 season, playing with the DEC Salzburg Eagles in the Elite Women's Hockey League (EWHL). During her two seasons with the team, she served as both an alternate captain and member of the coaching staff.

Fardelmann played with the New York Riveters (renamed Metropolitan Riveters in 2017) during the 2015–16 season of the National Women's Hockey League (NWHL; renamed Premier Hockey Federation—PHF in 2021). She participated in the ceremonial faceoff for the NWHL's inaugural game. She was the first Riveter to record a hat-trick, which she accomplished on December 27, 2015 against the Buffalo Beauts and for which she was recognized as the NWHL's Player of the Week.

In January 2016, Fardelmann was loaned to the Boston Pride for the first Outdoor Women's Classic, as many Pride members were unable to participate due to commitments with the US national team.

== International play ==
Fardelmann participated in the Women's National Festival in Lake Placid, N.Y. and was the top scorer in 2007. She was one of 22 players named to the 2007 U.S. Women's Under-22 Select Team. Playing with the US women's national select team in the Four Nations Cup in 2008, she scored in a 4–0 win against Sweden.

== Personal life ==
While attending Culver Academy, Fardelmann also played on the school's varsity lacrosse and soccer teams.

Fardelmann graduated from Boston College in 2009 with a Bachelor of Arts in communications and minor in economics.

She began her career outside of hockey following her return to the United States after two seasons spent in Austria, working in the manufacturing sector with General Motors in Kansas City, Kansas. After ten years with General Motors, she accepted a position with GE Aerospace in Lynn, Massachusetts, where she has worked since September 2021.
