= Gabie Figueroa =

American ice hockey player

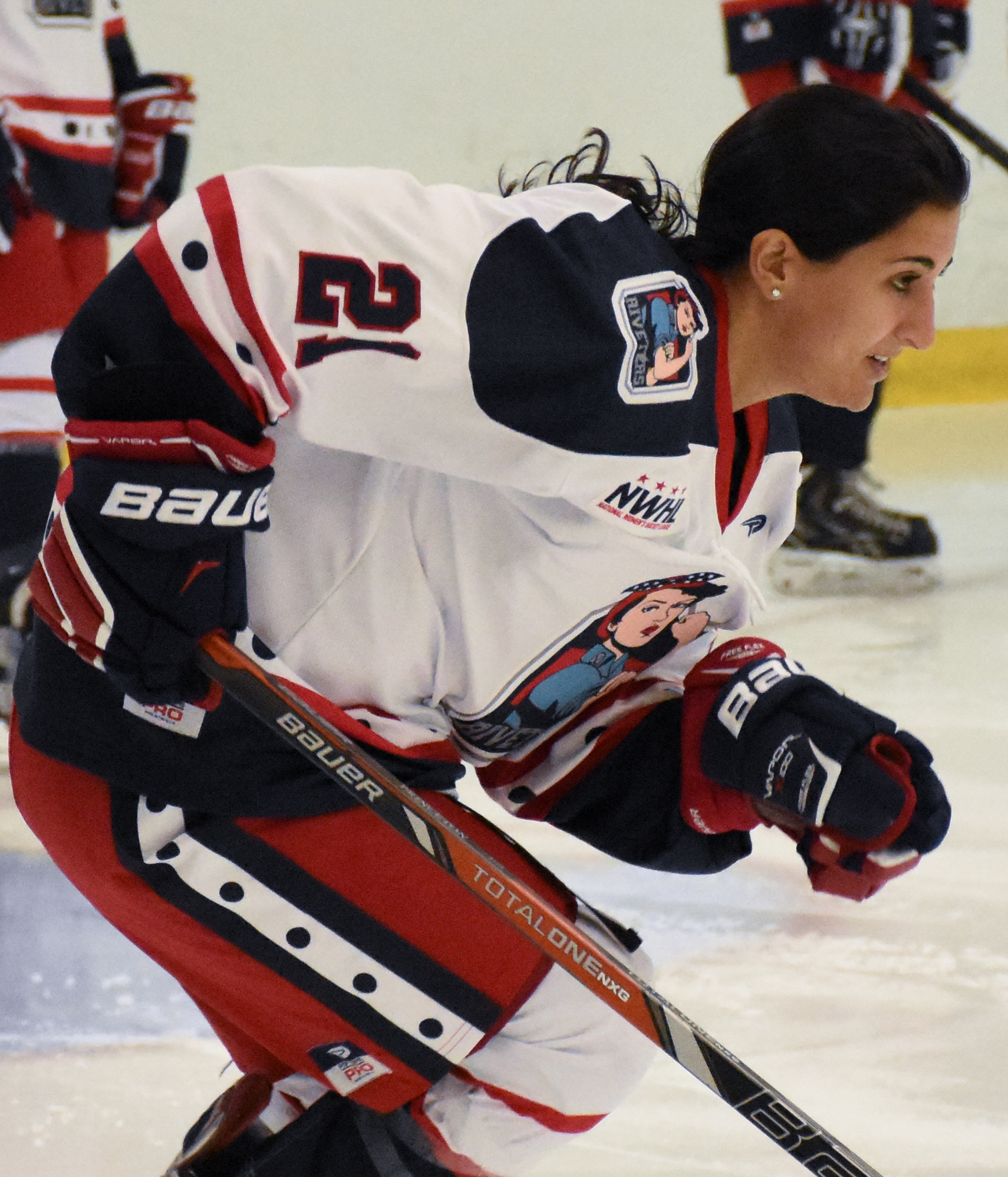
- Figueroa in 2015
- Born: February 21, 1992 (age 34) Branchburg, New Jersey, U.S.
- Height: 5 ft 6 in (168 cm)
- Weight: 146 lb (66 kg; 10 st 6 lb)
- Position: Defence
- Shot: Left
- Played for: New York Riveters
- Playing career: 2009–2017

Gabriella "Gabie" Figueroa (born February 21, 1992) is an American former professional ice hockey player who played for the New York Riveters of the National Women's Hockey League (NWHL).

== Playing career ==
Figueroa was originally a defenseman. She first played hockey when she was a 9-year-old. She got into the sport because a bunch of her brother's friends from school were playing. Before every game, she tapes her own stick. She believes doing so increases her puck control.

=== Youth ===
She played youth hockey for a number of clubs including Bridgewater Bears, Princeton Tiger Lilies, New Jersey Colonials and Connecticut Polar Bears and The Lawrenceville School. Playing for Lawrenceville, she was named an all state player three times. As a youth player, she sometimes played on all girls teams and mixed gender teams at the same time.

=== Collegiate ===
Figueroa attended college at Princeton University, where she played for the women's ice hockey team. Her senior season in 2013-2014 finished with 13 points on 12 assists and a goal. After finishing her career at Princeton, she initially believed her playing days were over because of the lack of opportunities for women to play after college.

=== NWHL ===
On August 15, 2015, Figueroa joined the New York Riveters for the inaugural 2015/16 NWHL season. Because of salary cap restraints, most players needed to work other jobs including Figueroa who made the league minimum of $10,000. As a result, she only trained with the team two times a week with games played on Sunday. When not training, she worked as a project engineer for Gilbane Building Company. That season, she played in all 18 regular season games for the team, along with making post-season appearances. She also played in the first game ever played in the league when the Riveters took on the Connecticut Whales. She also scored the team's first ever goal.

In 2016, she participated in the NWHL Free Agent Camp, watched by general managers from several teams in the league. She was one of only three defenders playing for her team in a scrimmage match. In September 2016, it was announced that Figueroa would join the practice squad for the New York Riveters in their 2016/17 season. Playing for the Riveters in 2017, injuries to other players meant she sometimes was playing as a forward. By mid-season, she had scored three times for her team.

=== National team ===
She played for the United States women's u-18 national ice hockey team. With the team for the 2010 IIHF U-18 World Championship, she won a silver medal.

=== Coaching ===
In 2016, she was involved with running a USA Hockey ADM clinic.

== Awards and Honors ==
- 2014 Princeton's Patty Kazmaier Award (team award given annually to a senior member of the women's hockey team)

== Personal ==
Originally from Branchburg, New Jersey, Figueroa attended college at Princeton University. Figueroa graduated from Princeton in 2014 with a degree in structural engineering.
