= Jason LaBarbera =

Canadian ice hockey player (born 1980)

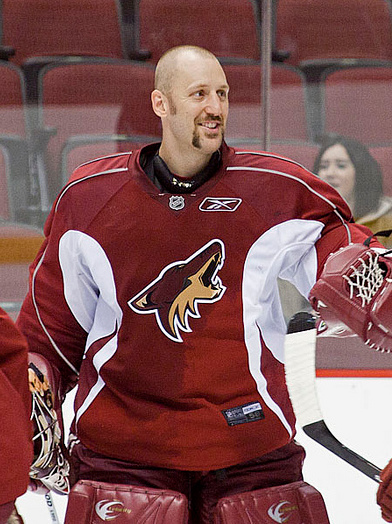
- LaBarbera with the Phoenix Coyotes in 2010
- Born: January 18, 1980 (age 46) Burnaby, British Columbia, Canada
- Height: 6 ft 3 in (191 cm)
- Weight: 232 lb (105 kg; 16 st 8 lb)
- Position: Goaltender
- Caught: Left
- Played for: New York Rangers; Los Angeles Kings; Vancouver Canucks; Phoenix Coyotes; Edmonton Oilers; Anaheim Ducks
- NHL draft: 66th overall, 1998; New York Rangers
- Playing career: 2000–2016

Antonio Jason LaBarbera (born January 18, 1980) is a Canadian former professional ice hockey goaltender who played parts of 11 seasons in the National Hockey League (NHL).

He was originally drafted by the New York Rangers in the 1998 NHL entry draft during his major junior career in the Western Hockey League (WHL), and also played for the Los Angeles Kings, Vancouver Canucks, Phoenix Coyotes, Edmonton Oilers, Chicago Blackhawks, and Anaheim Ducks during his NHL career.

== Playing career ==
=== Amateur ===
As a youth, LaBarbera played in the 1993 Quebec International Pee-Wee Hockey Tournament with a minor ice hockey team from Langley, British Columbia.

LaBarbera played major junior ice hockey in the Western Hockey League (WHL) primarily with the Portland Winter Hawks for four seasons and briefly with the Tri-City Americans and Spokane Chiefs. He was drafted by the New York Rangers in the 1998 NHL entry draft in the third round, 66th overall.

=== Professional ===
==== New York Rangers (2000–2005) ====
LaBarbera saw his first NHL action with the New York Rangers in his first season out of junior in relief of Kirk McLean, his childhood hero, on October 14, 2000. He recorded two saves in ten minutes of play in an 8–6 loss to the Pittsburgh Penguins. He spent his first four seasons with the Rangers' organization, however, in the minor leagues with the Charlotte Checkers of the ECHL and the Hartford Wolf Pack of the American Hockey League (AHL).

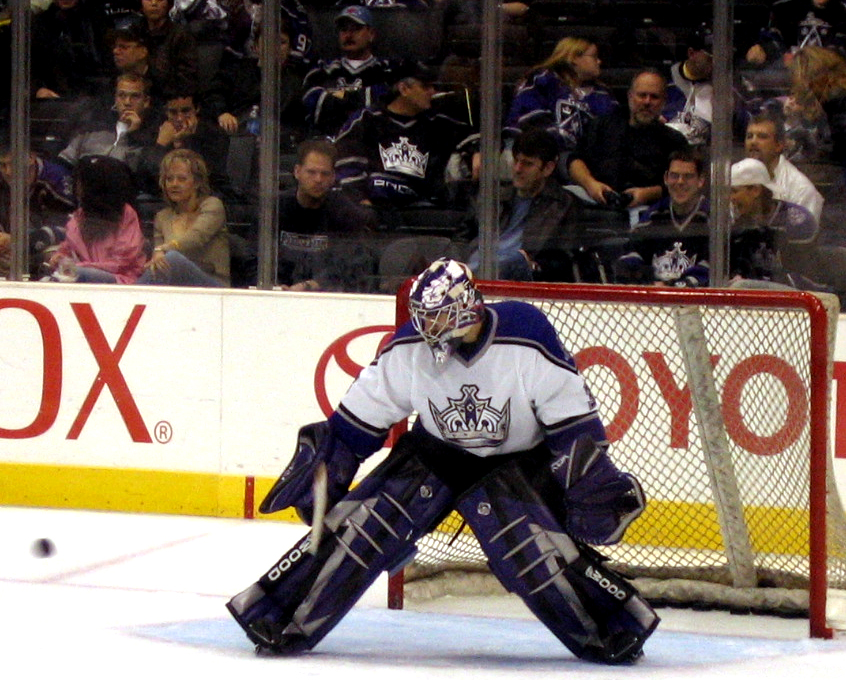
LaBarbera while a member of the Los Angeles Kings

The 2003–04 season brought an increase in playing time for LaBarbera with the Rangers. In the midst of a spectacular season with the Wolf Pack, which culminated in a Les Cunningham Award as AHL MVP and an Aldege "Baz" Bastien Memorial Award as top goaltender, he was called up to the Rangers and played in four games that season. LaBarbera recorded a 1–2–0 record, 4.85 goals against average (GAA) and a .824 save percentage during his brief stint. His lone NHL victory that season, the first of his career, was a 3–2 win over the Washington Capitals on March 5, 2004.

Continuing to play with the Wolf Pack during the 2004–05 NHL lockout, LaBarbera earned the Harry "Hap" Holmes Memorial Award for allowing the fewest goals in the League.

==== Los Angeles Kings (2005–2008) ====
Despite another successful season in the AHL, the Rangers did not re-sign LaBarbera, presumably due to the Rangers' deep depth in goal, with standout draft picks Henrik Lundqvist and Al Montoya in the team's pipeline. Instead, he signed as a free agent with the Los Angeles Kings in the off-season.

LaBarbera's first full season in the NHL was spent backing-up Kings starting goaltender Mathieu Garon. He got off to a quick start with the Kings, going undefeated in his first seven starts. LaBarbera earned his first career NHL shutout on April 17, 2006, blanking the San Jose Sharks in a 4–0 victory.

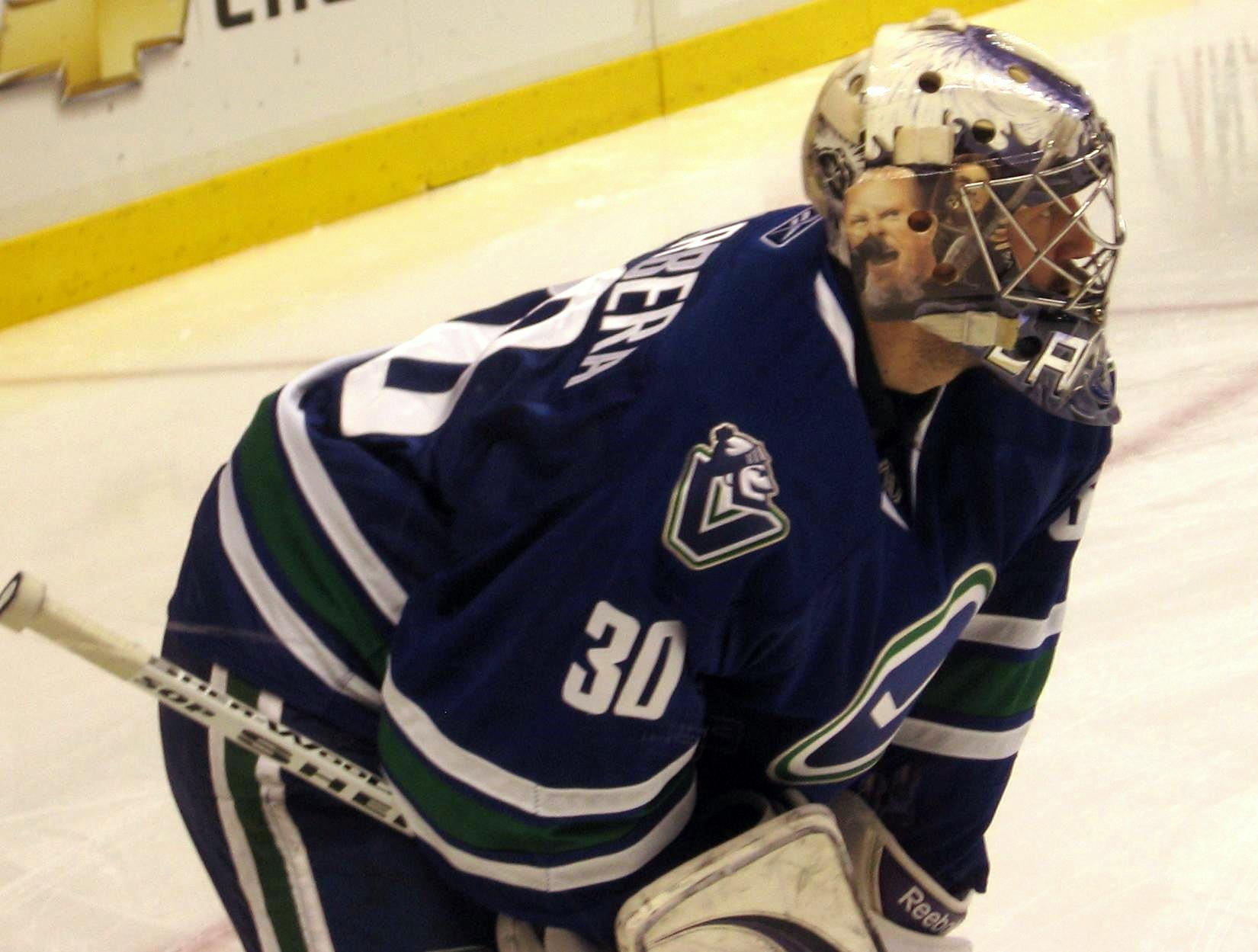
LaBarbera with the Canucks in 2009.

In 2006–07, LaBarbera played for the Kings' minor league affiliate, the Manchester Monarchs, in the AHL. Despite injuries to Kings goaltenders Mathieu Garon and Dan Cloutier during the season, the Kings were hesitant to recall LaBarbera because he was waiver eligible, which required him to clear waivers in order to be recalled and demoted, making it likely that he would be claimed by another team. LaBarbara completed the season with the Monarchs and earned the second Harry Holmes Memorial Award and Aldege Bastien Memorial Award of his AHL career. In the off-season, LaBarbera re-signed with the Kings to a two-year contract on July 3, 2007. LaBarbera earned more playing time in 2007–08, appearing in a career-high 45 games with a 3.00 GAA and a .910 save percentage.

==== Vancouver Canucks (2008–2009) ====
The following season, on December 30, 2008, LaBarbera was traded to his hometown team, the Vancouver Canucks, in exchange for a seventh-round draft pick in 2009, a trade resulting in the emergence of rookie goaltender Jonathan Quick. The Canucks dealt for LaBarbera in light of injuries to Roberto Luongo and backup Curtis Sanford. LaBarbara earned his first win with the Canucks in his club debut, making 31 saves in a 2–1 victory over the Nashville Predators on January 1, 2009.

==== Phoenix Coyotes (2009–2013) ====
LaBarbera was signed to a two-year, $2 million contract by the Phoenix Coyotes to back-up Coyotes starter Ilya Bryzgalov on July 1, 2009. LaBarbara compiled a total record of 15–11–4 in his first two seasons in Phoenix. On June 6, 2011, he was re-signed by the Coyotes to another two-year contract.

==== Edmonton Oilers (2013) ====
On July 5, 2013, during the free agency period of 2013, LaBarbera signed a one-year, $1 million deal with the Edmonton Oilers. He competed with Richard Bachman to be the backup to starter Devan Dubnyk. After Bachman was injured, then sent down to Edmonton's AHL affiliate, LaBarbera won the backup job in Edmonton.

==== Chicago Blackhawks (2013–2014) ====
On December 14, 2013, LaBarbera was traded to the Chicago Blackhawks in exchange for future considerations. LaBarbera never appeared in a game for the Blackhawks. Instead, he went (15-15-2) with the Rockford Icehogs, the team's AHL affiliate.

==== Anaheim Ducks (2014–2015) ====
On July 1, 2014, the Anaheim Ducks signed LaBarbera as a free agent to a one-year, $750,000 contract. He attended the Ducks' training camp before ultimately being assigned to their AHL affiliate, the Norfolk Admirals, after clearing waivers.

==== Philadelphia Flyers (2015–2016) ====
On July 2, 2015, LaBarbera signed a one-year, two-way contract with the Philadelphia Flyers. He never appeared for the Flyers, but rather spent the entire season in the AHL with the Lehigh Valley Phantoms.

On July 19, 2016, LaBarbera announced his retirement from professional hockey after 16 seasons.

== Coaching career ==
After retiring as a player Labarbera accepted a role as the goaltending coach of the Calgary Hitmen of the Western Hockey League. On December 16, 2020, LaBarbera was named the new goaltending coach for the Calgary Flames.

== Personal life ==
LaBarbera and his wife Kodette are the parents of two sons, Ryder and Easton. Ryder was diagnosed with autism. Kodette starred in the Canadian W Network TV show Hockey Wives and talked about her son's autism treatment program in Calgary, Alberta.

== Career statistics ==
			Regular season									Playoffs
Season	Team	League	GP	W	L	T/OT	MIN	GA	SO	GAA	SV%	GP	W	L	MIN	GA	SO	GAA	SV%
1996–97	Tri-City Americans	WHL	2	1	0	0	64	4	0	3.77	.857	—	—	—	—	—	—	—	—
1996–97	Portland Winter Hawks	WHL	9	5	1	0	443	18	0	2.44	.907	—	—	—	—	—	—	—	—
1997–98	Portland Winter Hawks	WHL	23	18	4	0	1305	72	1	3.31	.891	—	—	—	—	—	—	—	—
1998–99	Portland Winter Hawks	WHL	51	18	20	3	2994	170	4	3.41	.904	4	0	4	252	19	0	4.52	.899
1999–00	Portland Winter Hawks	WHL	34	8	24	2	2005	123	1	3.68	.903	—	—	—	—	—	—	—	—
1999–00	Spokane Chiefs	WHL	21	12	6	2	1146	50	0	2.62	.900	9	6	1	435	18	1	2.48	.890
2000–01	New York Rangers	NHL	1	0	0	0	10	0	0	0.00	1.000	—	—	—	—	—	—	—	—
2000–01	Charlotte Checkers	ECHL	35	18	10	7	2100	112	1	3.20	.910	2	1	1	143	5	0	2.10	.945
2000–01	Hartford Wolf Pack	AHL	4	1	1	0	156	12	0	4.61	.871	—	—	—	—	—	—	—	—
2001–02	Charlotte Checkers	ECHL	13	9	3	1	744	29	0	2.34	.924	4	2	2	212	12	0	3.40	.910
2001–02	Hartford Wolf Pack	AHL	20	7	11	1	1058	55	0	3.12	.912	—	—	—	—	—	—	—	—
2002–03	Hartford Wolf Pack	AHL	46	18	17	6	2452	105	2	2.57	.915	2	0	2	117	6	0	3.07	.867
2003–04	Hartford Wolf Pack	AHL	59	34	9	9	3393	90	13	1.59	.936	16	11	5	1043	30	3	1.73	.935
2003–04	New York Rangers	NHL	4	1	2	0	198	16	0	4.85	.824	—	—	—	—	—	—	—	—
2004–05	Hartford Wolf Pack	AHL	53	31	16	2	2937	90	6	1.84	.934	4	1	3	238	9	0	2.27	.940
2005–06	Los Angeles Kings	NHL	29	11	9	2	1433	69	1	2.89	.900	—	—	—	—	—	—	—	—
2005–06	Manchester Monarchs	AHL	3	1	1	1	185	10	0	3.25	.907	—	—	—	—	—	—	—	—
2006–07	Manchester Monarchs	AHL	62	39	20	1	3619	133	7	2.20	.933	13	6	7	824	38	1	2.77	.911
2007–08	Los Angeles Kings	NHL	45	17	23	2	2421	121	1	3.00	.910	—	—	—	—	—	—	—	—
2008–09	Los Angeles Kings	NHL	19	5	8	4	995	47	2	2.83	.893	—	—	—	—	—	—	—	—
2008–09	Vancouver Canucks	NHL	9	3	2	2	451	20	0	2.66	.915	—	—	—	—	—	—	—	—
2009–10	Phoenix Coyotes	NHL	17	8	5	1	928	33	0	2.13	.928	—	—	—	—	—	—	—	—
2010–11	Phoenix Coyotes	NHL	17	7	6	3	883	48	2	3.26	.909	—	—	—	—	—	—	—	—
2011–12	Phoenix Coyotes	NHL	19	3	9	3	1015	43	0	2.54	.911	—	—	—	—	—	—	—	—
2012–13	Phoenix Coyotes	NHL	15	4	6	2	726	32	0	2.64	.923	—	—	—	—	—	—	—	—
2013–14	Edmonton Oilers	NHL	7	1	3	0	348	19	0	3.28	.870	—	—	—	—	—	—	—	—
2013–14	Oklahoma City Barons	AHL	2	0	1	1	124	4	0	1.53	.953	—	—	—	—	—	—	—	—
2013–14	Rockford IceHogs	AHL	32	15	15	2	1859	91	0	2.94	.901	—	—	—	—	—	—	—	—
2014–15	Norfolk Admirals	AHL	34	9	16	7	1948	85	3	2.62	.912	—	—	—	—	—	—	—	—
2014–15	Anaheim Ducks	NHL	5	2	0	1	207	9	0	2.61	.909	—	—	—	—	—	—	—	—
2015–16	Lehigh Valley Phantoms	AHL	23	7	14	0	1313	66	1	3.02	.899	—	—	—	—	—	—	—	—
NHL totals			187	62	73	20	9615	457	6	2.85	.907	—	—	—	—	—	—	—	—

== Awards ==
- Named to the WHL All-Star Team in 2000.
- Named to the AHL First All-Star Team in 2004 and 2007.
- Awarded the Aldege "Baz" Bastien Memorial Award (AHL Top Goaltender) in 2004 and 2007.
- Awarded the Les Cunningham Award (AHL MVP) in 2004.
- Awarded the Harry "Hap" Holmes Memorial Award (AHL, fewest team goals against) in 2005 and 2007.

== Records ==
- Most shutouts in one season in the AHL – 13 (2003–04)

Awards and achievements
Preceded by Marc Lamothe; Dany Sabourin	Aldege "Baz" Bastien Memorial Award; 2003–04; 2006–07	Succeeded by Ryan Miller; Michael Leighton
