= George Parros =

American ice hockey player (born 1979)

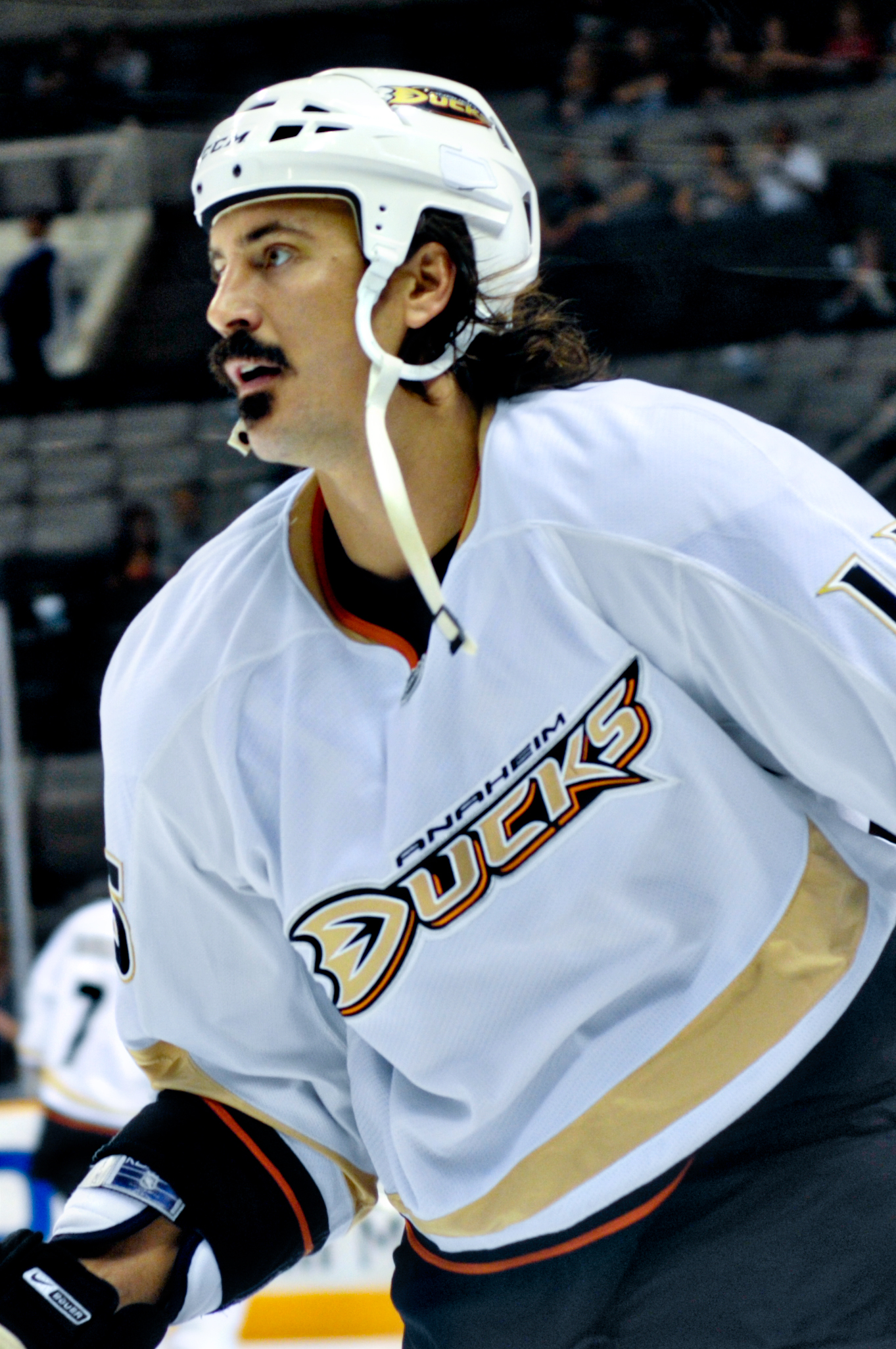
- Parros with the Anaheim Ducks in 2009
- Born: December 29, 1979 (age 46) Washington, Pennsylvania, U.S.
- Height: 6 ft 5 in (196 cm)
- Weight: 232 lb (105 kg; 16 st 8 lb)
- Position: Right wing
- Shot: Right
- Played for: Los Angeles Kings; Colorado Avalanche; Anaheim Ducks; Florida Panthers; Montreal Canadiens
- NHL draft: 222nd overall, 1999; Los Angeles Kings
- Playing career: 2005–2014

George James Parros (born December 29, 1979) is an American former professional ice hockey player who played nine seasons in the National Hockey League (NHL), who currently serves as the head of the NHL's Department of Players Safety, with the title of senior vice president of player safety. In this role, Parros is tasked with determining the suspensions or fines handed out for various on-ice incidents in the NHL. His primary role on the ice was that of an enforcer. Parros was part of the 2007 Stanley Cup winning Anaheim Ducks.

== Early life ==
A native of Washington, Pennsylvania of Greek descent, Parros grew up in Randolph, New Jersey. He played for the (then Morris County, now) New Jersey Colonials and high school hockey at the Delbarton School in Morristown, New Jersey. He won Rookie of the Year honors in 1994–1995, followed by All-State recognition as an upperclassman. After high school, Parros attended an offseason event where he was seen by Princeton scouts. He was given a chance to play hockey at Princeton University.

== Playing career ==
=== Junior ===
After graduating high school in 1998, he deferred admission to Princeton University to play junior hockey with the Chicago Freeze in the North American Hockey League during the 1998–99 season. Playing in junior gave him a chance to improve his play and get a bit bigger. During his 54 games with the Freeze in junior, Parros nearly averaged a point per game.

=== College ===
Parros played four years at Princeton University, where he totaled 52 points and 119 PIM in 111 games. He was named team captain for his senior season in 2002–03. While at Princeton, Parros majored in economics and wrote his senior thesis on the West Coast longshoremen's labor dispute. In 2010, he was chosen as the fourth-smartest athlete in sports by the Sporting News.

=== Professional ===
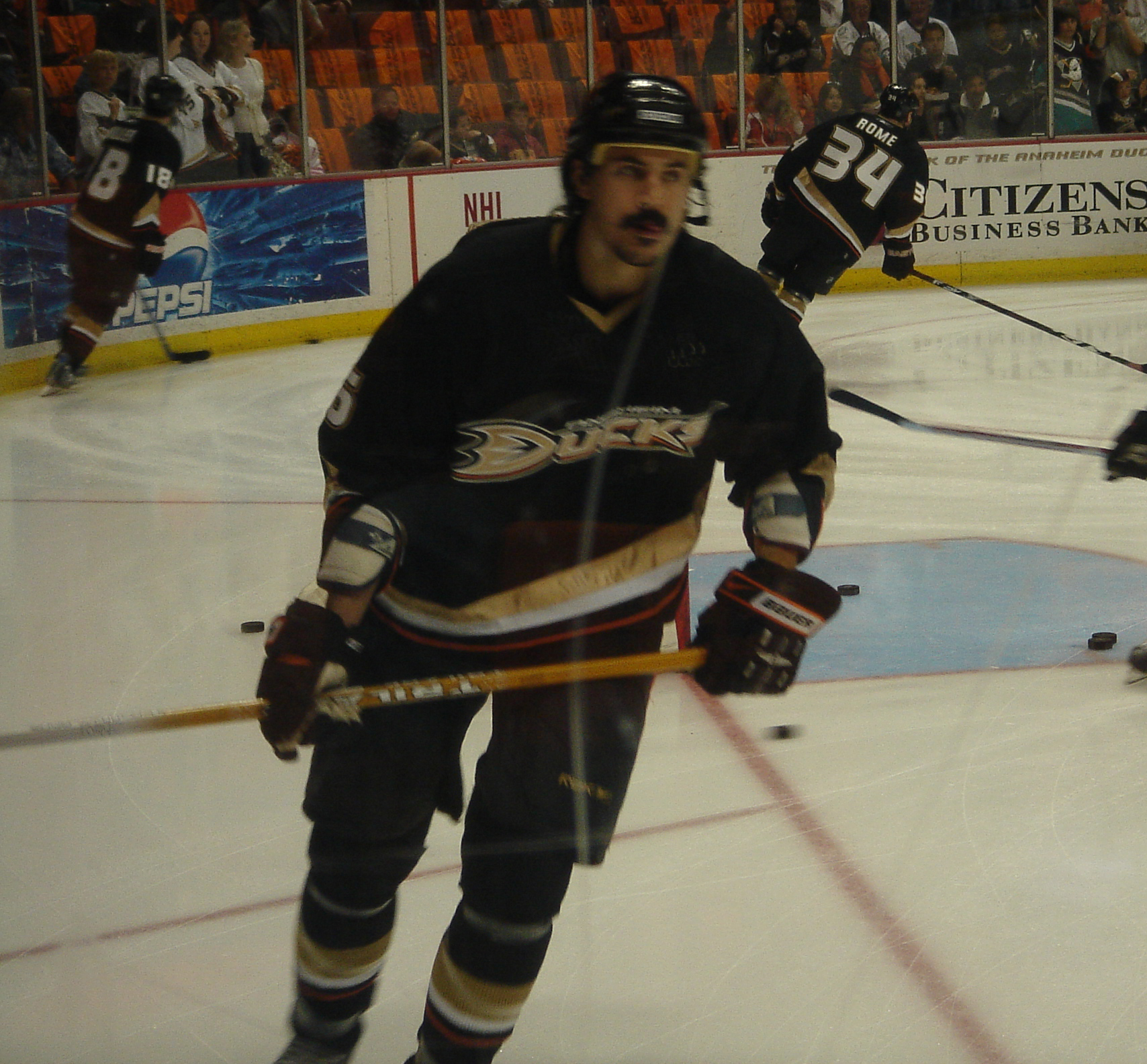
Parros as a member of the Anaheim Ducks during a pre-game warm-up in April 2007

Parros was drafted by the Los Angeles Kings in the eighth round (222nd) of the 1999 NHL entry draft. After graduating from Princeton, he joined the Manchester Monarchs, the Kings' AHL affiliate. Parros remained with the team through the 2004–05 season. His best season was 2004–05, when Parros had 22 points (14 goals, 8 assists) and 247 penalty minutes. He was second on the team in penalty minutes that season. He also appeared in three games with the Reading Royals, the Kings' ECHL affiliate, where Parros took boxing lessons to become a better fighter.

When Parros made his NHL debut with the Kings on October 5, 2005, he became the seventh Princeton Tiger to play in the NHL. He scored his first NHL goal on October 20 against the Dallas Stars at the American Airlines Center in Dallas, Texas. He recorded a goal, an assist and a major fighting penalty in the same game, an achievement known as a "Gordie Howe hat trick." He missed a total of 21 games over two different stretches between November and January of that season. However, he finished the 2005–06 season with two goals, three assists, and 138 PIM in 55 games. He played in the most games for a Kings' rookie during that season, as well as leading all Kings' players in major penalties.

On October 2, 2006, he was waived by the Kings and picked up by the Colorado Avalanche. He would play in only two games for the Avalanche. Just a month later, on November 13, 2006, Parros was traded to the Anaheim Ducks for a 2nd round draft pick and an option to swap 3rd round picks. During the 2006–07 season, he scored just one goal against the Chicago Blackhawks. He led the Ducks with 18 fighting majors during the regular season.

Parros was a member of the Anaheim Ducks team that won the Stanley Cup in 2007. On June 12, 2007, coming off of the Stanley Cup win, George Parros and the Ducks agreed to a two-year contract. The contract was worth 1.1 million dollars for two years. Parros had 183 penalty minutes during the 2007–08 season, at the conclusion of which the Ducks would be eliminated in the first round of their Stanley Cup defense by the Dallas Stars. His penalty minutes would drop to 135 the following season despite playing in an additional five games, while contributing five goals and five assists.

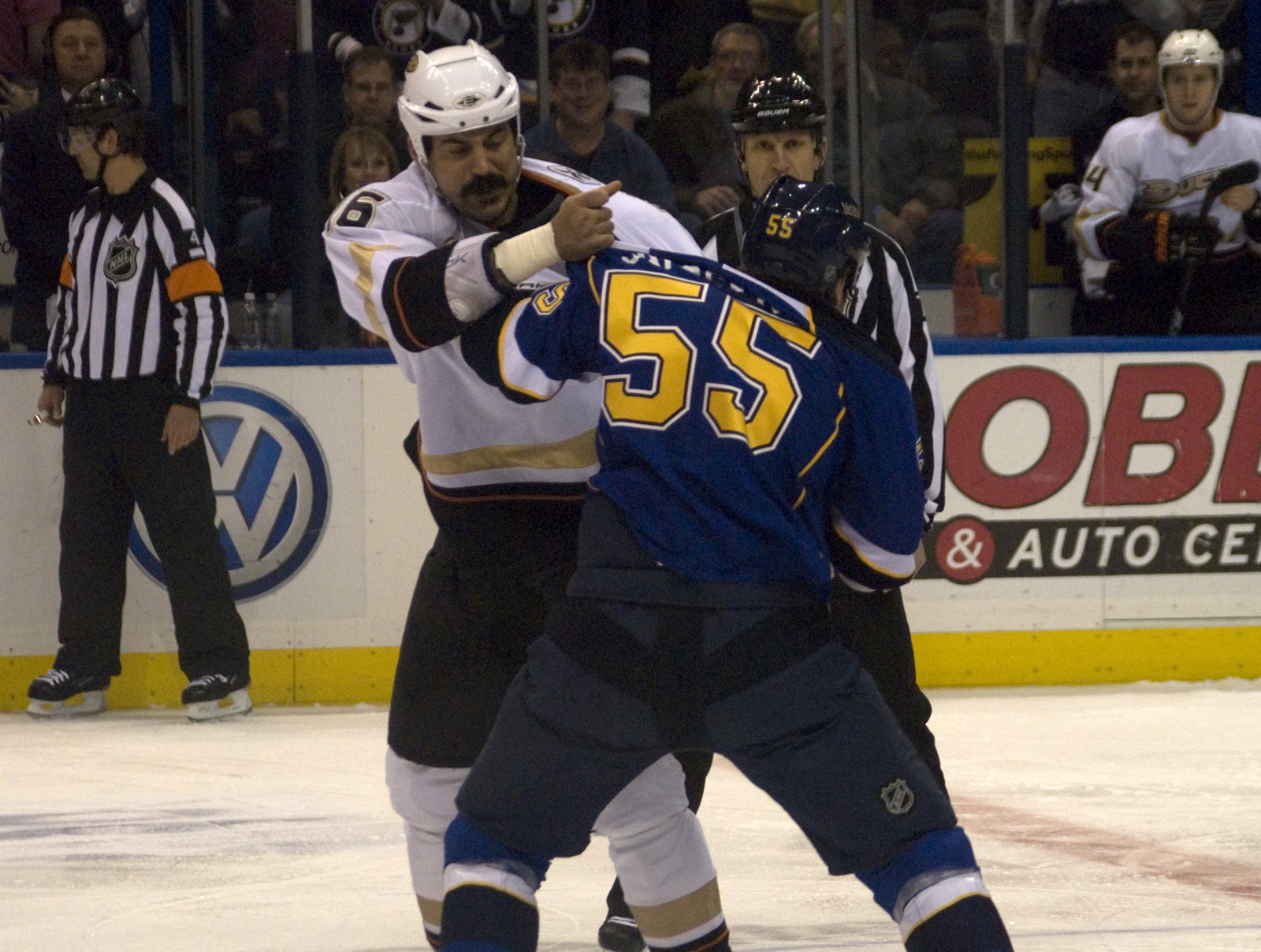
Parros with the Ducks in February 2011 fighting with Cam Janssen

After the better part of 6 seasons with the Ducks, Parros left as a free agent and signed a two-year contract with the Florida Panthers on July 1, 2012.

On July 5, 2013, after one season with the Panthers, Parros was traded to the Montreal Canadiens for Philippe Lefebvre and a 7th round draft pick in 2014. In the season opener against the Toronto Maple Leafs on October 1, 2013, Parros engaged in a fight with Colton Orr in the third period. Parros lost his balance and fell headfirst to the ice, knocking him out. Orr expressed immediate concern, waving for training staff to make their way to Parros as he lay on the ice motionless. Parros was concussed, and taken off on a stretcher. He missed the next twelve games as a result of his injuries. This incident touched off renewed debate regarding player safety and fighting's place in the National Hockey League. After returning to play, Parros sustained a second concussion on December 14, 2013, following a fight with Eric Boulton during a game against the New York Islanders. Parros next played on January 11, 2014, in a game against the Chicago Blackhawks. However, he saw limited action during the season, either because of injury or because of being a healthy scratch, and appeared in only 22 games in total.

The Canadiens did not offer Parros another contract at the end of the season and on July 1, 2014, he became an unrestricted free agent. On December 5, 2014 he announced his retirement from playing hockey.

== Post-playing career ==
In September 2016, the NHL announced that Parros had joined the league's Department of Player Safety. In September 2017, he was promoted to senior vice president of player safety, succeeding Stéphane Quintal as head of the Department of Player Safety. Upon being promoted, Parros said, "What uniquely positions me for the job is that I played the game as physically as anybody and I never once was fined or suspended." Parros said that he wanted to address slashing and other "nonhockey plays."

=== Tom Wilson controversies ===
In a game between the Washington Capitals and New York Rangers on May 3, 2021, during the aftermath of a play at the net, Capitals forward Tom Wilson was involved in two separate incidents. First, he pulled Rangers forward Pavel Buchnevich to the ice, pushing down on the back of Buchnevich's neck with his stick, and then while holding him there, punched Buchnevich in the back of his head as he lay face down on the ice. During the resultant scrum, he twice threw a helmetless Ranger, Artemi Panarin, to the ice, the first time by his hair, ultimately causing an injury to Panarin which kept him out for the last three games left in the season. The following day, Parros, as head of the Department of Player Safety, assessed a $5,000 fine to Wilson, the maximum allowable under the Collective Bargaining Agreement. This fine was specifically for Wilson's punch to Buchnevich, while no punishment was issued for the interaction with Panarin.

The lack of suspension drew wide condemnation from coaches, from current and former players, including retired enforcers, as well as from fans and the media. The Rangers then released an unprecedented statement publicly condemning George Parros by name, accusing him of being "unfit," and calling for his removal. The NHL subsequently fined the Rangers $250,000 for this statement criticizing Parros. It was also reported that earlier in the year, Wilson nearly avoided what ultimately was a seven-game suspension for a hit to the head of Boston Bruins defenseman Brandon Carlo, who was hospitalized and missed nearly a month of action. As reported by The Athletic's Rick Carpiniello, Parros "didn't even want to suspend Wilson, ... but [NHL Commissioner Gary] Bettman didn't like the optics, and ordered a suspension."

== Hair and Moustache ==
Parros is known for the large mustache that he often grows during the season, which he has said was inspired by a musician named Sean "Greazy" Bryan, known for his elaborate facial hair. According to a Denver Post article on November 7, 2006, Parros received grief from teammates in Colorado for shaving the mustache. Parros grew the mustache back, but his short time as a member of the team ended. According to an OC Register article on January 28, 2007, while in college Parros had a fantasy hockey team called the All-Star Mustaches. Growing up, Parros and his brother Jeff would have mustache-growing competitions. "George Parros Mustaches" were also sold at the Anaheim Ducks team store inside the Honda Center, with the proceeds going to charity.

Parros has a line of apparel called "Stache Gear" that benefits The Garth Brooks Teammates For Kids Foundation.

In addition to his mustache, George Parros is known for growing his hair long. He did not always have long hair; as a Princeton representative he'd had to keep himself well groomed. Once he graduated, he grew his hair out all summer, until the first day of training camp with the Manchester Monarchs. According to an article in USA Hockey magazine, Parros's hair got out of hand; word got out that he was planning to cut it. An employee of the Monarchs told Parros about "Locks of Love", a charity organization that makes wigs for children who have lost their hair due to medical conditions. Around Christmas-time each year, when Parros's hair reaches the appropriate length, he donates it.

== Personal life ==
After his 2014 retirement, Parros focused his attention on his clothing brand, Violent Gentlemen.

Parros is a fan of Swedish metal band Amon Amarth and is featured in their music video for the song "Raise Your Horns", of the 2016 album "Jomsviking".

Parros and his wife Tiffany have twins, born in 2011. Tiffany Parros appeared on two seasons of the Canadian reality television series Hockey Wives.

Parros makes a cameo appearance in Goon: Last of the Enforcers.

== Career statistics ==
| | | | Regular season | | | | | Playoffs |
| Season | Team | League | GP | G | A | Pts | PIM | GP | G | A | Pts | PIM |
|---|---|---|---|---|---|---|---|---|---|---|---|---|
| 1996–97 | Delbarton Green Wave | HS-Prep | 14 | 15 | 8 | 23 | — | — | — | — | — | — |
| 1997–98 | Delbarton Green Wave | HS-Prep | 15 | 22 | 17 | 39 | — | — | — | — | — | — |
| 1998–99 | Chicago Freeze | NAHL | 54 | 30 | 20 | 50 | 126 | — | — | — | — | — |
| 1999–2000 | Princeton University | ECAC | 27 | 4 | 2 | 6 | 14 | — | — | — | — | — |
| 2000–01 | Princeton University | ECAC | 31 | 7 | 10 | 17 | 38 | — | — | — | — | — |
| 2001–02 | Princeton University | ECAC | 31 | 9 | 13 | 22 | 38 | — | — | — | — | — |
| 2002–03 | Princeton University | ECAC | 22 | 0 | 7 | 7 | 29 | — | — | — | — | — |
| 2002–03 | Manchester Monarchs | AHL | 9 | 0 | 1 | 1 | 7 | — | — | — | — | — |
| 2003–04 | Manchester Monarchs | AHL | 57 | 3 | 6 | 9 | 126 | 5 | 0 | 0 | 0 | 4 |
| 2004–05 | Manchester Monarchs | AHL | 67 | 14 | 8 | 22 | 247 | 6 | 1 | 1 | 2 | 27 |
| 2004–05 | Reading Royals | ECHL | 3 | 0 | 0 | 0 | 9 | — | — | — | — | — |
| 2005–06 | Los Angeles Kings | NHL | 55 | 2 | 3 | 5 | 138 | — | — | — | — | — |
| 2006–07 | Colorado Avalanche | NHL | 2 | 0 | 0 | 0 | 0 | — | — | — | — | — |
| 2006–07 | Anaheim Ducks | NHL | 32 | 1 | 0 | 1 | 102 | 5 | 0 | 0 | 0 | 10 |
| 2007–08 | Anaheim Ducks | NHL | 69 | 1 | 4 | 5 | 183 | 1 | 0 | 0 | 0 | 0 |
| 2008–09 | Anaheim Ducks | NHL | 74 | 5 | 5 | 10 | 135 | 7 | 0 | 0 | 0 | 9 |
| 2009–10 | Anaheim Ducks | NHL | 57 | 4 | 0 | 4 | 136 | — | — | — | — | — |
| 2010–11 | Anaheim Ducks | NHL | 78 | 3 | 1 | 4 | 171 | 6 | 0 | 0 | 0 | 16 |
| 2011–12 | Anaheim Ducks | NHL | 46 | 1 | 3 | 4 | 85 | — | — | — | — | — |
| 2012–13 | Florida Panthers | NHL | 39 | 1 | 1 | 2 | 57 | — | — | — | — | — |
| 2013–14 | Montreal Canadiens | NHL | 22 | 0 | 1 | 1 | 85 | — | — | — | — | — |
| NHL totals | | | 474 | 18 | 18 | 36 | 1092 | 19 | 0 | 0 | 0 | 35 |

== Awards and achievements ==
| Award | Year |
|---|---|
NAHL
| All-Rookie Team | 1999 |
| Rookie of the Year | 1999 |
College
| ECAC All-Academic Team | 2001, 2002, 2003 |
NHL
| Stanley Cup (Anaheim Ducks) | 2007 |

== Transactions ==
- June 26, 1999 – Drafted by the Los Angeles Kings in the 8th round, 222nd overall.
- October 2, 2006 – Waived by Los Angeles and picked up by the Colorado Avalanche.
- November 13, 2006 – Traded to the Anaheim Ducks for a 2nd round draft pick and an option to swap 3rd round picks.
- June 12, 2007 – Signed two-year contract with the Anaheim Ducks.
- January 29, 2009 – Signed three-year extension with the Anaheim Ducks.
- July 1, 2012 – Signed two-year contract as an unrestricted free agent with the Florida Panthers.
- July 5, 2013 – Traded to the Montreal Canadiens for Philippe Lefebvre and a 7th round pick in the 2014 NHL entry draft.
