= Nana Fujimoto =

Japanese ice hockey player (born 1989)

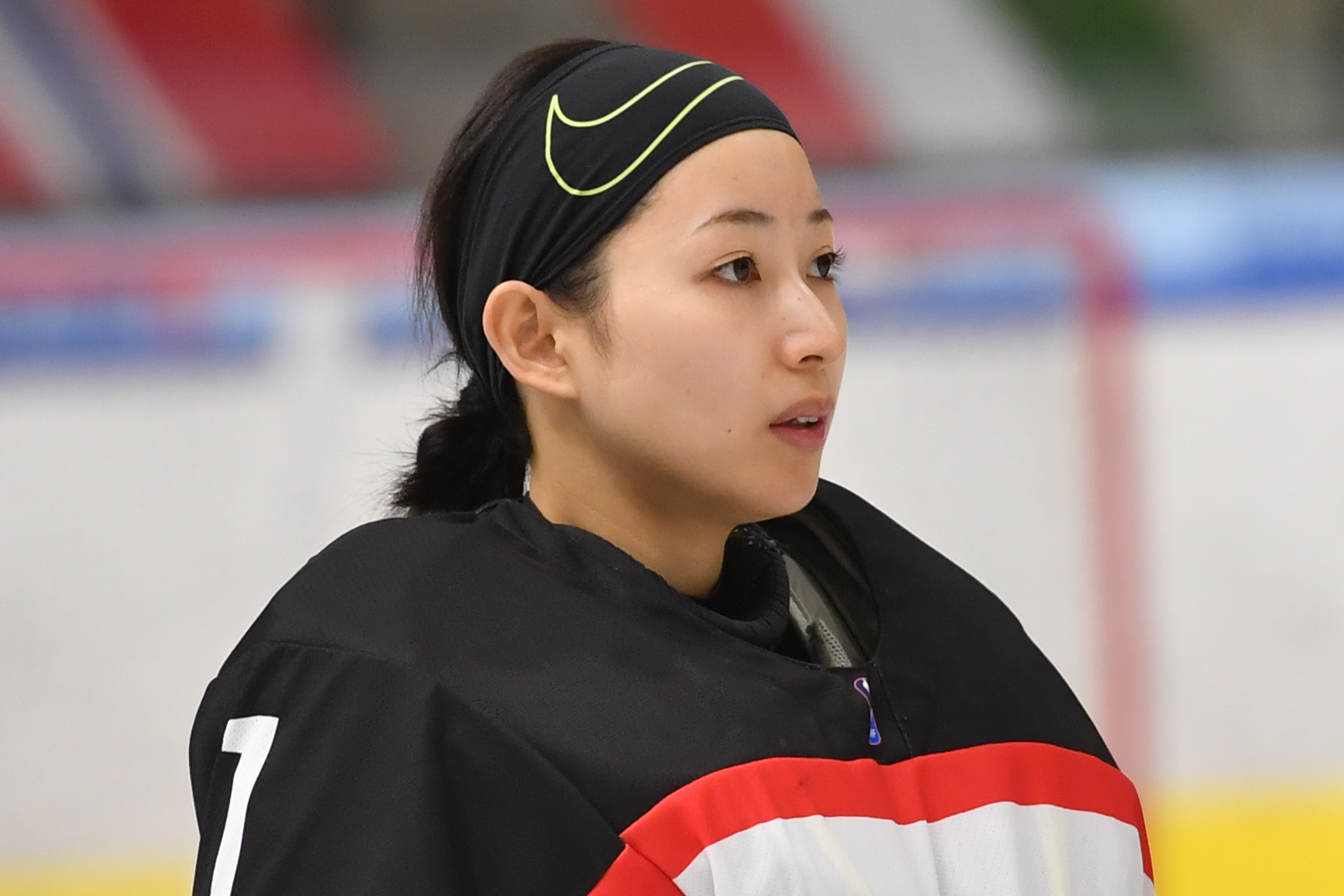
- Fujimoto in 2017
- Born: 3 March 1989 (age 36) Sapporo, Japan
- Height: 1.64 m (5 ft 5 in)
- Weight: 56 kg (123 lb; 8 st 11 lb)
- Position: Goaltender
- Catches: Left
- Played for: New York Riveters; Vortex Sapporo
- National team: Japan
- Playing career: 2007–present

Nana Fujimoto (藤本 那菜, Fujimoto Nana; born 3 March 1989 in Sapporo, Hokkaido, Japan) is a Japanese professional ice hockey goaltender who most recently played for Färjestad BK of the Damettan. A member of the Japanese national team, Fujimoto was previously a starting goaltender for the New York Riveters of the National Women's Hockey League (NWHL).

== Career ==
Fujimoto participated at the 2015 IIHF Women's World Championship and was named best goalkeeper of the tournament.

Fujimoto was signed by the New York Riveters of the National Women's Hockey League on 27 July 2015. Fujimoto played as the starting goaltender for the franchise's first season and was selected as a starter for the 2016 All-Star Game. Fujimoto did not return to the NWHL for the 2016/17 season due to her obligations towards the Japanese national team.

Fujimoto competed at both the 2014 and the 2018 Winter Olympics.

== Career statistics ==
Year	Team	Event	Result	GP	W	L	T/OT	MIN	GA	SO	GAA	SV%
2014	Japan	OG	7th	5	0	5	0	271:41	15	0	3.31	0.886
2018	Japan	OG	6th	4	1	3	0	236:30	7	0	1.78	0.920
2022	Japan	OG	6th	5	3	2	0	292:54	12	-	2.46	0.920
