= Oakville Jr. Hornets =

- City: Oakville, Ontario, Canada
- League: Ontario Women's Hockey League
- Founded: 1996 (parent org); 2004 (OWHL franchise)
- Colours: Red, black, white
- Head coach: Stacey McConnell
- Website: oakvillehornets.com

Franchise history
- 2004–2010: Oakville Jr. Ice
- 2010–present: Oakville Jr. Hornets

Championships
- Regular season titles: 2 (2014–15, 2016–17)
- League champions: 1 (2016–17)
- Provincial champions (since 2004): 2 (2014–15, 2016–17)

The Oakville Jr. Hornets are a women's junior ice hockey team based in Oakville, Ontario, Canada. They are members of the Ontario Women's Hockey League.

== History ==
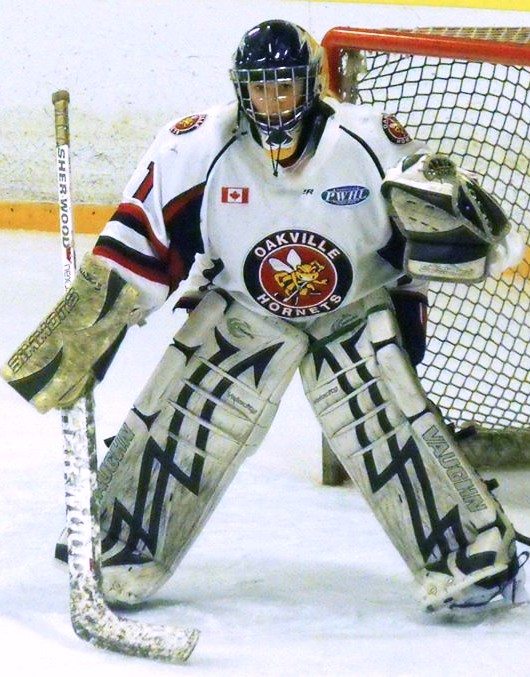
A Hornets goalie during the 2013–14 season

For 10 seasons prior to 2010, the Hornets operated as the Oakville Jr. Ice, an affiliate of the senior team of the same name under the ownership of businessman Bill Metcalfe. For the 2010–11 season, the Oakville Hornets Girls Hockey Association (who held the team's league registration rights) removed Metcalfe and rebranded the team as the Jr. Hornets, citing a desire for their junior club to be more closely related to the youth teams they operated.

In the 2012 playoffs, the thirteenth-seeded Hornets upset the fourth-seed London Jr. Devilettes before being swept by the almost-undefeated Toronto Jr. Aeros.

After beginning the season with a 22-game unbeaten streak, the 2014–15 Hornets were regular season champions and made the league semi-finals for the first time. They would go on to earn a bronze medal before winning the Ontario Women's Hockey Association provincial championship.

In the 2015–16 season, the Hornets finished in second at the provincial championship.

Bolstered by the addition of Lexie Adzija, the leading scorer from the previous year's Devilettes, the 2016–17 Hornets began the season on a 17-game unbeaten streak, eventually losing to the Mississauga Jr. Chiefs. They would go on to win a 'triple crown', finishing first the regular season standings, winning the league playoffs (their first league title), and earning gold at the provincial tournament. Team captain Emma Maltais would win the league scoring title.

As captain in the 2017–18 season, Sarah Fillier led the league tournament in scoring with 12 points in 10 games, and was named MVP of the provincial tournament. Oakville would come just short of repeat championships, losing 1–0 to the Toronto Jr. Aeros in the fourth straight league finals between the two clubs before earning silver at the provincial championship.

== Notable alumni ==
(Canada) denotes senior national team alumnus

- Lexie Adzija – PWHL Ottawa
- (Canada) Victoria Bach – Markham Thunder, PWHL Toronto
- (Canada) Jaime Bourbonnais – PWHL New York
- Amy Curlew – Toronto Six
- Jessica Digirolamo – PWHL Boston
- (Canada) Sarah Fillier
- (Canada) Loren Gabel – Boston Pride, PWHL Boston
- Anissa Gamble – Calgary Inferno, Toronto Furies
- Lindsay Grigg – Buffalo Beauts, HV71, Markham Thunder
- Cassidy MacPherson – Buffalo Beauts
- (Canada) Emma Maltais – PWHL Toronto
- Christina Putigna – Boston Pride
- (United States) Hayley Scamurra – Buffalo Beauts, PWHL Ottawa
