= Durham West Jr. Lightning =

- City: Ajax, Ontario, Canada
- League: Ontario Women's Hockey League
- Founded: 2004 (OWHL franchise)
- Home arena: Ajax Community Centre
- Colours: Black, Blue, Silver, and White
- General manager: Paul Gee
- Head coach: Dave Gwyn

Championships
- Regular season titles: 3 (2015–16, 2021–22, 2022–23)
- League champions: 2 (2021–22, 2023–24)
- Provincial champions (since 2004): 2 (2012–13, 2022–23)

The Durham West Jr. Lightning are a Canadian women's junior ice hockey team based in Ajax, Ontario. They are members of the Ontario Women's Hockey League.

== History ==
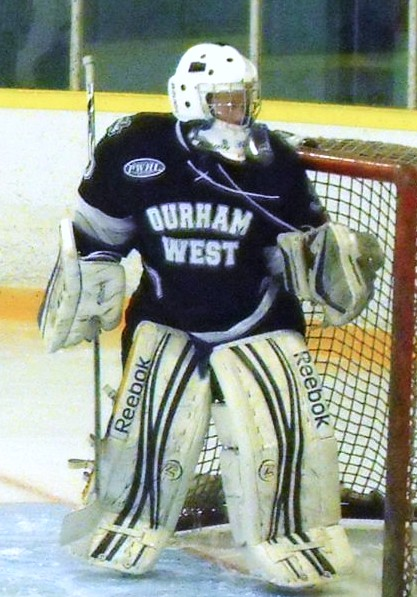
A Lightning goalie during the 2013–14 season

In the 2005–06 season, Jenn Wakefield led the Lightning to a bronze medal in league playdowns and a silver medal at OWHA Provincials, setting a then-league record for most goals in a single season with 31 goals in 27 games. The next season, Wakefield's record was surpassed by forward Natalie Spooner's 32 goals, as the Lightning made a run to the finals, losing to the Toronto Jr. Aeros.

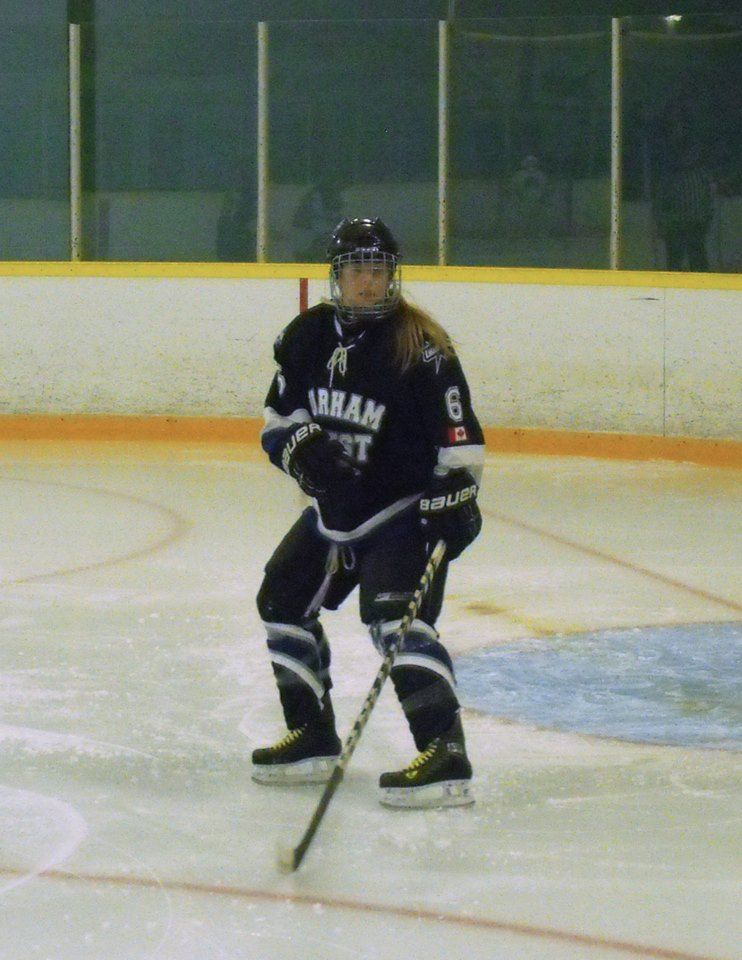
A Lightning player during the 2013–14 season

In 2013, after losing in the quarterfinals of the league playoffs, the Lightning won their first ever provincial championship, defeating the Stoney Creek Jr. Sabres 3–1 in the semifinals and the Mississauga Jr. Chiefs 3–2 in the finals..

== Season-by-season results ==
Season	GP	W	L	T	OTL	GF	GA	Pts	Finish	Playoffs	OWHA's
2004-05	30	15	11	4	-	85	61	34	5th PWHL	Lost in Round Robin	Lost in Round Robin
2005-06	30	17	7	6	-	115	80	40	4th PWHL	Won Bronze (Markham-Stouffville)	Won Silver (Toronto)
2006-07	32	20	6	6	-	103	67	46	2nd PWHL	Lost final (Toronto)	Lost Bronze (Mississauga)
2007-08	31	17	10	4	-	132	86	38	5th PWHL	Lost Bronze (Mississauga)	Lost preliminary (Hamilton)
2008-09	34	19	10	5	-	126	93	43	6th PWHL	Lost Bronze (Bluewater)	Lost Bronze (Toronto)
2009-10	34	2	32	0	0	49	167	4	18th PWHL	Did not qualify	Lost in Round Robin
2010-11	36	14	15	5	2	73	80	35	12th PWHL	Lost quarter-final (Mississauga)	Lost preliminary (Mississauga)
2011-12	34	19	10	3	2	87	65	43	9th PWHL	Lost First Round (Bluewater)	Lost preliminary (Whitby)
2012-13	38	27	6	2	3	118	53	59	3rd PWHL	Lost quarter-final (London)	Won Gold (Mississauga)
2013-14	38	26	6	2	4	108	66	58	5th PWHL	Lost quarter-final (Toronto)	Lost Bronze (Nepean)
2014-15	38	19	12	6	1	87	61	45	9th PWHL		

== Notable alumni ==
(Canada) denotes senior national team alumnus

- Kennedy Marchment – Linköping HC, HV71, Connecticut Whale, PWHL Montreal
- (Canada) Natalie Spooner – Mississauga Chiefs, Toronto Fury, PWHL Toronto
- Saroya Tinker – Metropolitan Riveters, Toronto Six
- (Canada) Jenn Wakefield – Toronto Furies, Linköping HC, Borås HC (Men's), Luleå HF/MSSK, Brynäs IF, Djurgårdens IF, Modo Hockey
- (Canada) Tara Watchorn – Alberta Honeybadgers, Boston Blades
