= Julia Gosling =

Canadian ice hockey player (born 2001)

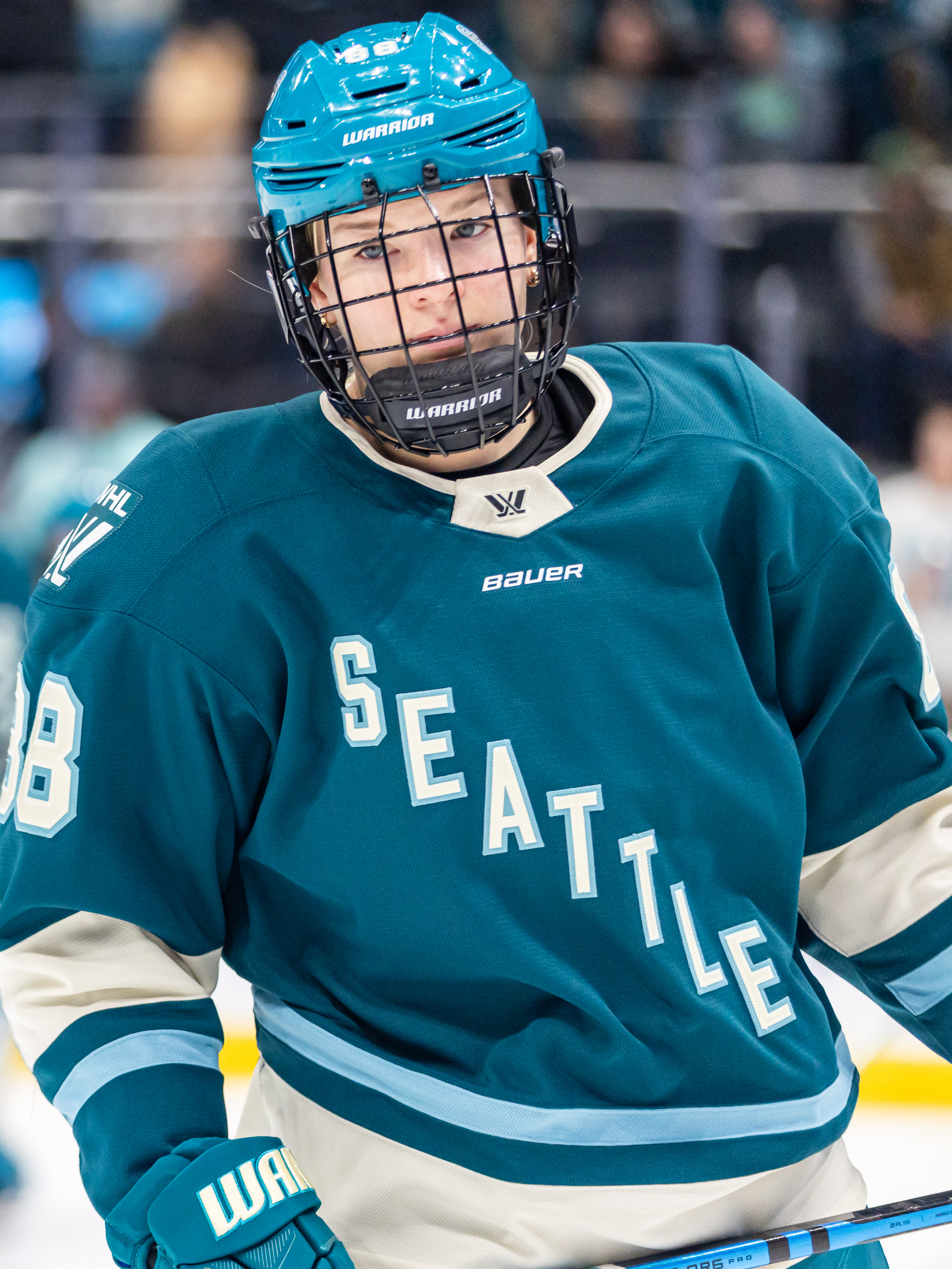
- Gosling with the Seattle Torrent in 2025
- Born: February 21, 2001 (age 25) London, Ontario, Canada
- Height: 5 ft 11 in (180 cm)
- Weight: 162 lb (73 kg; 11 st 8 lb)
- Position: Forward
- Shoots: Left
- PWHL team Former teams: Seattle Torrent; Toronto Sceptres
- National team: Canada
- Playing career: 2024–present
Medal record
Olympic Games
Silver medal – second place	2026 Milano Cortina	Team
World Championships
Gold medal – first place	2024 United States
Silver medal – second place	2025 Czechia
World U18 Championships
Bronze medal – third place	2018 Russia
Gold medal – first place	2019 Japan

Julia Gosling (born February 21, 2001) is a Canadian professional ice hockey forward for the Seattle Torrent of the Professional Women's Hockey League (PWHL) and the Canada women's national ice hockey team. She was drafted sixth overall by the Toronto Sceptres in the 2024 PWHL draft after playing college ice hockey at St. Lawrence University, where she served as team captain and recorded 128 points in 111 games.

Gosling has represented Canada at both the youth and senior levels. She won bronze and gold medals at the 2018 and 2019 U18 World Championships. At the senior level, she made her debut at the 2024 IIHF Women's World Championship, scoring in the gold medal game as Canada defeated the United States 6–5 in overtime. She returned to win silver at the 2025 IIHF Women's World Championship.

== Playing career ==
=== Collegiate ===
Gosling played four seasons of college hockey at St. Lawrence University, becoming one of the program's most decorated players. In her freshman season, Gosling appeared in 25 games for the Saints, recording 10 goals and 11 assists for 21 points. She scored three power play goals and three game-winners while blocking 20 shots and winning 67 faceoffs. Her performance earned her ECAC Hockey Rookie of the Week honors twice, on January 27 and February 3, 2020. She also earned a spot on the ECAC Hockey All-Academic Team. Gosling registered her first career point with an assist at Syracuse on November 16, 2019, and scored her first career goal at Brown on January 10, 2020. During the COVID-19 shortened season, Gosling played in just 10 games but made a significant impact, recording seven goals and three assists for 10 points. She scored two game-winning goals and one power play goal. Despite the abbreviated season, Gosling was named to the First-Team All-ECAC Hockey and was a finalist for both ECAC Hockey Player of the Year and ECAC Hockey Best Forward. She was also named ECAC Hockey Player of the Week on February 15, 2021, and maintained her place on the ECAC Hockey All-Academic Team. Returning to St. Lawrence for her junior year, Gosling was named team captain and played in all 39 games. She led the Saints with 21 goals and 25 assists for 46 points, also recording three power play goals and four game-winners. She blocked 19 shots and won 369 faceoffs during the season. Her strong performance earned her Second-Team All-ECAC Hockey honors, ECAC Hockey Forward of the Month for November 2022, and ECAC Hockey Forward of the Week on November 29, 2022. She was also named to the ECAC Hockey All-Academic Team for the third time.

In her final collegiate season, Gosling continued as team captain and appeared in 37 games, missing two while representing Canada in the November Rivalry Series. She finished second on the Saints with 22 goals and 29 assists for 51 points, establishing career highs in both categories. Gosling scored nine power play goals, one shorthanded goal, and seven game-winners while blocking 16 shots and winning 312 faceoffs. She ranked fourth nationally with nine power play goals, 11th with 0.59 goals per game, 12th with 1.38 points per game, and 15th with 0.78 assists per game. Her seven game-winners tied a St. Lawrence record, matching the mark last set by Kennedy Marchment in 2016–17.

Gosling was named Second-Team All-ECAC Hockey for the second consecutive season and earned ECAC Hockey Forward of the Week honors on October 3, 2023. She was selected to the ECAC Hockey All-Academic Team for the fourth time and was nominated for the Mandi Schwartz Scholar-Athlete of the Year award. She was also named an AHCA Krampade All-American Scholar and inducted into St. Lawrence's PJ Flanagan Century Club for surpassing 100 career points. Following the conclusion of her senior season, Gosling made the decision to forgo her final year of NCAA eligibility to enter the 2024 PWHL draft. Over her four-year career at St. Lawrence, she totaled 60 goals and 68 assists for 128 points in 111 games.

=== Professional ===
==== Toronto Sceptres (2024–25) ====
External videos
- Gosling scoring the fastest goal in PWHL post-season history PWHL, retrieved December 24, 2025

On June 25, 2024, Gosling signed a two-year contract with the Toronto Sceptres after being selected sixth overall in the 2024 PWHL Draft. She made her professional debut in the 2024–25 PWHL season, though struggled early on, taking 15 games and 31 shots before scoring her first career goal. She finished with four regular season goals, all scored on the power play.

In her playoff debut on May 7, 2025, Gosling recorded her first multi-goal professional game, scoring twice in Toronto's 3–2 victory over Minnesota in Game 1 of the Playoffs. Both goals came in the second period, including one on the power play that extended Toronto's lead to 3–0. The second goal was also her first career even-strength goal, ending an 11-game goalless drought dating back to February 19. Gosling recorded three goals across Toronto's playoff run, including another two-goal performance in Game 1. Gosling added a third goal in Game 4, scoring on Toronto's first shot of the game, but Toronto fell to the defending Walter Cup champions 3–1 in the best-of-five series, with Minnesota clinching the series with a 4–3 overtime victory in Game 4.

==== Seattle Torrent (2025–present) ====
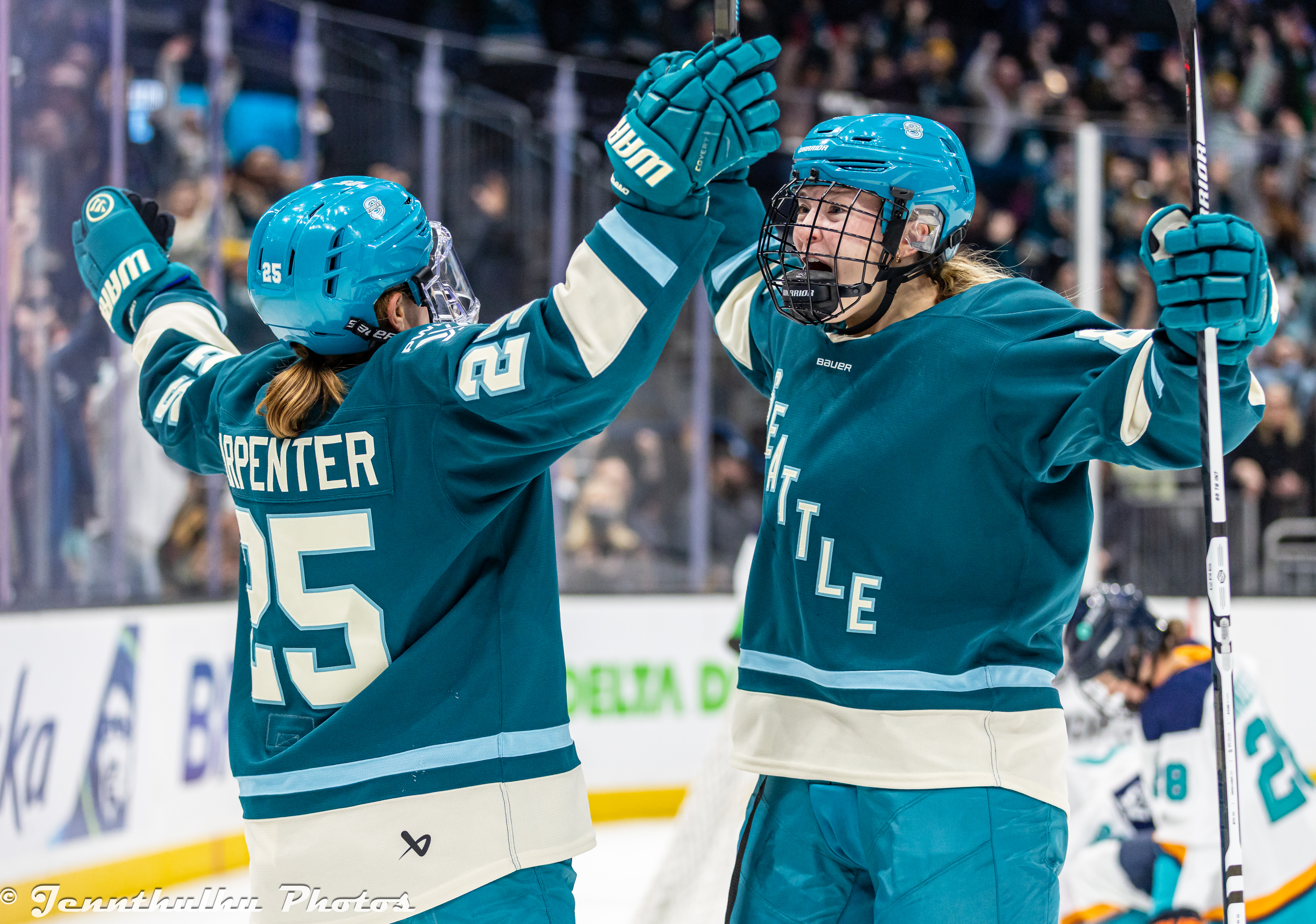
Gosling celebrates a goal with Alex Carpenter at Climate Pledge Arena, December 3, 2025

On June 9, 2025, Gosling was selected seventh overall by the Seattle Torrent in the 2025 PWHL Expansion Draft. She made an immediate impact in Seattle's inaugural game on November 23, 2025, scoring twice against Vancouver, including the franchise's first-ever goal. It marked her third career multi-goal game in the PWHL. On December 3, 2025, Gosling recorded her first assist of the season in the Torrent's first-ever home win, a dramatic 2–1 comeback victory over the New York Sirens at Climate Pledge Arena. The Torrent scored two power play goals in 22 seconds late in the third period, with Gosling's top line of Hilary Knight, Alex Carpenter, and herself accounting for nearly half of Seattle's shots on goal (9/20). On December 17, 2025, she opened the scoring with a power play goal in the final three seconds of the first period in a 4–1 victory over the Ottawa Charge before 9,389 fans at Climate Pledge Arena. The goal came on a tic-tac-toe passing sequence, as Alex Carpenter entered the zone and sent a cross-ice pass to Hannah Bilka in the left circle, who fed Gosling at the back post for a backhand finish past goaltender Sanni Ahola. Gosling's third goal and second assist of the season placed her in a tie with Carpenter for second in the league in points (5) and second overall in goals after just four games. After only four games, she was already one goal shy of her entire 2024–25 total (4 goals in 30 games) and halfway to her rookie points total. The top line trio of Gosling, Carpenter, and Knight had combined to score seven of Seattle's nine goals through the first four games.

On December 23, 2025, Gosling scored the game-winning goal in a 2–1 victory over the Montreal Victoire before 10,276 fans at Climate Pledge Arena. The goal came early in the third period during a delayed penalty situation and was assisted by Hilary Knight. The play survived a video review lasting more than six minutes to determine whether Montreal's Marie-Philip Poulin had possessed the puck before Knight knocked it off her stick and fed Gosling cross-ice for the finish. Earlier in the game, Gosling had set up Carpenter's tying goal in the second period on a 2-on-1 rush. The victory extended Seattle's winning streak at home and came against 2024–25 PWHL Goaltender of the Year Ann-Renée Desbiens. On January 20, 2026, Gosling scored her sixth goal of the season at 4:21 of the second period, deflecting a shot by Lyndie Lobdell to give Seattle its first lead in the Torrent's 6–4 victory over Toronto, in the highest-scoring game of the PWHL season. The goal extended Gosling's point streak to three games and brought her to a career-high 11 points, surpassing the 10 points she recorded in 30 games as a rookie with Toronto. The Torrent's six goals set a franchise record and matched the season high for any PWHL team.

== International play ==
=== Junior ===
Gosling represented Canada at the under-18 level, appearing in 11 games and recording five goals and three assists for eight points. She won bronze with Canada at the 2018 IIHF World Women's U18 Championship and gold at the 2019 IIHF World Women's U18 Championship.

In May 2021, Gosling was one of 28 players invited to Hockey Canada's Centralization Camp for the 2022 Winter Olympics selection process. At age 19, she was the youngest player centralized ahead of the Beijing Games. However, she did not make the final Olympic roster.

=== Senior ===
Gosling made her senior international debut with Canada in the November 2023 Rivalry Series against the United States. She was selected to Canada's roster for the 2024 IIHF Women's World Championship, becoming one of only two players making their World Championship debut on the team.

In a pre-tournament game against Finland on March 31, 2024, Gosling scored her first goal with Canada's senior team. Minutes later, her cousin Nicole Gosling also scored her first senior team goal in the same game, marking a special moment for both players and their families.

At the 2024 IIHF Women's World Championship in Utica, New York, Gosling contributed to Canada's gold medal victory. In the gold medal game against the United States on April 14, 2024, she scored Canada's second goal early in the second period, beating American goaltender Aerin Frankel with a low shot to give Canada a 2–1 lead. Canada ultimately defeated the United States 6–5 in overtime, with Danielle Serdachny scoring the game-winning goal. It was Canada's 13th gold medal at the Women's World Championship and first since 2022.

In April 2025, Gosling was named to Canada's roster for the 2025 IIHF Women's World Championship held April 10–20 in České Budějovice, Czech Republic, as the defending champions sought back-to-back gold medals. She was one of 18 returning players from the 2024 gold medal-winning team. Gosling appeared in four games during the tournament, recording one goal and two assists for three points. Canada advanced to the gold medal game after defeating Switzerland and Finland in the playoff rounds. In the final on April 20, 2025, Canada fell to the United States 4–3 in overtime, with Canada capturing the silver medal.

Following the tournament, Gosling was named to Canada's roster for the November 2025 Rivalry Series.

On January 9, 2026, she was named to Canada's roster to compete at the 2026 Winter Olympics. On February 7, 2026, Gosling was one of six Canadian skaters making their Olympic debut as Canada played Switzerland. Defeating Switzerland in a 4–0 final, Gosling recorded a goal. Two days later, Gosling scored twice as Canada prevailed over Czechia in a 5–1 final.

In the final game of preliminary round play of Group A, Gosling recorded a goal as Canada beat Finland by a 5–0 mark.

== Personal life ==
Gosling's cousins, Katelyn Gosling and Nicole Gosling, are both ice hockey players. She is also related to actor Ryan Gosling; he is her second cousin (her father's cousin's son). As of June 2025, they have not met.

== Career statistics ==
=== Regular season and playoffs ===
Note: GP = Games played; G = Goals; A = Assists; Pts = Points; PIM = Penalty minutes;

			Regular season					Playoffs
Season	Team	League	GP	G	A	Pts	PIM	GP	G	A	Pts	PIM
2015–16	London Jr. Devilettes	Prov. WHL	1	0	0	0	0	—	—	—	—	—
2016–17	London Jr. Devilettes	Prov. WHL	37	16	7	23	12	5	1	0	1	0
2017–18	London Jr. Devilettes	Prov. WHL	32	19	18	37	16	4	1	2	3	4
2018–19	London Jr. Devilettes	Prov. WHL	27	23	20	43	26	12	14	5	19	6
2020–21	St. Lawrence University	ECAC	25	10	11	21	10	—	—	—	—	—
2021–22	St. Lawrence University	ECAC	10	7	3	10	2	—	—	—	—	—
2022–23	St. Lawrence University	ECAC	39	21	25	46	6	—	—	—	—	—
2023–24	St. Lawrence University	ECAC	37	22	29	51	29	—	—	—	—	—
2024–25	Toronto Sceptres	PWHL	30	4	6	10	6	4	3	0	3	0
2025–26	Seattle Torrent	PWHL	30	6	14	20	10	—	—	—	—	—
PWHL totals			60	10	20	30	16	4	3	0	3	0

=== International ===
Note: GP = Games played; G = Goals; A = Assists; Pts = Points; PIM = Penalty minutes;

				Regular season
Year	Team	Event	Result	GP	G	A	Pts	PIM
2018	Canada	U18	3rd place, bronze medalist(s)	6	3	0	3	2
2019	Canada	U18	1st place, gold medalist(s)	5	2	3	5	8
2024	Canada	WC	1st place, gold medalist(s)	7	2	0	2	0
2025	Canada	WC	2nd place, silver medalist(s)	4	1	2	3	0
2026	Canada	OG	2nd place, silver medalist(s)	7	3	2	5	0
Junior totals				11	5	3	8	10
Senior totals				18	6	4	10	0

== Awards and honors ==
Honors	Year
College
ECAC Hockey All-Academic Team	2020, 2021, 2023, 2024
Second-Team All-ECAC Hockey	2023, 2024
AHCA Krampade All-American Scholar	2024
St. Lawrence's PJ Flanagan Century Club	2024
