= Saroya Tinker =

Canadian ice hockey defender (born 1998)

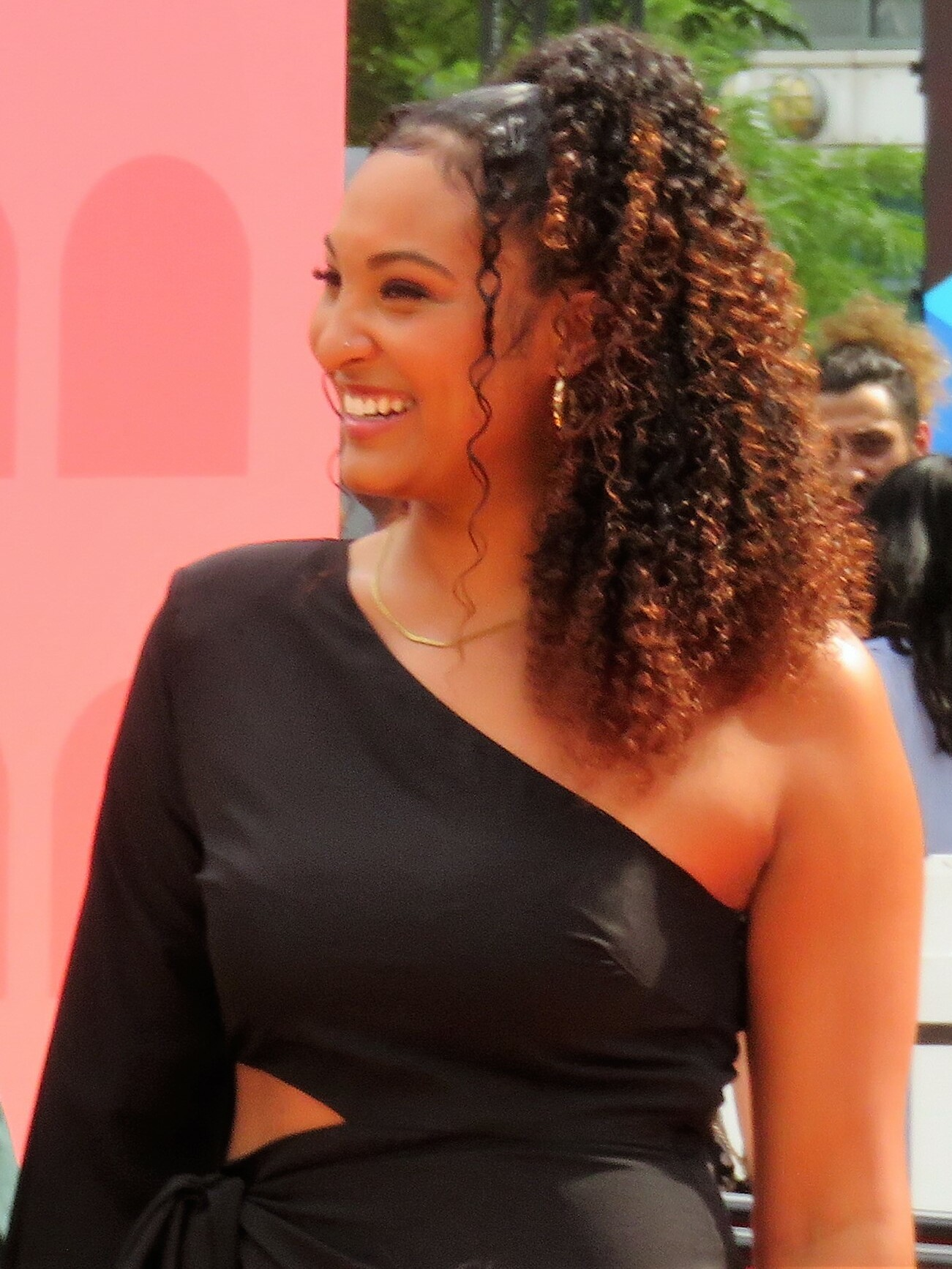
- Tinker in 2022
- Born: February 17, 1998 (age 28) Oshawa, Ontario, Canada
- Height: 5 ft 9 in (175 cm)
- Weight: 154 lb (70 kg; 11 st 0 lb)
- Position: Defence
- Shot: Right
- Played for: Toronto Six; Metropolitan Riveters; Yale Bulldogs
- National team: Canada
- Playing career: 2016–2023
Medal record
Women's ball hockey
World Championship
Bronze medal – third place	2017 Czech Republic
Women's ice hockey
World U18 Championship
Silver medal – second place	2016 Canada

Saroya Tinker (born February 17, 1998) is a Canadian former ice hockey defenceman. She last played for the Toronto Six of the Premier Hockey Federation (PHF), with whom she won the 2023 Isobel Cup championship.

== Playing career ==
Tinker attended Monsignor Paul Dwyer Catholic High School in Oshawa, Ontario, where she was an eight-sport high school athlete, playing on Dwyer’s ice hockey, badminton, basketball, curling, field lacrosse, soccer, track and field, and ultimate frisbee teams. A skilled athlete in multiple disciplines, she was recognized as the Junior Female Athlete of the Year in 2012–13 and 2013–14, and the Senior Female Athlete of the Year in 2015–16, in addition to being named ice hockey team MVP in 2013–14 and 2014–15, badminton team MVP in 2013–14 and 2014–15, basketball team MVP in 2013–14, and soccer team MVP in 2013–14. She served as captain of the ice hockey team from grades 10 through 12, captained the basketball and ultimate frisbee teams, and was assistant captain for the soccer team.

Tinker’s minor league career was played with the Clarington Flames Midget AA of the Lower Lakes Female Hockey League (LLFHL) during the 2013–14 season and with the Durham West Jr. Lightning of the Provincial Women's Hockey League (PWHL) during the 2014–15 and 2015–16 seasons. She helped the Jr. Lightning advance to the PWHL Final Four Weekend, registering four goals and fourteen assists (18 points) during the regular season, and seven assists in ten playoff games.

Tinker played the entirety of her collegiate eligibility with the Yale Bulldogs of the ECAC Hockey, scoring 32 points in 122 games played. During her time at Yale, she was recognised for her physical, shutdown style of play.

She was drafted fourth overall by the Metropolitan Riveters in the 2020 NWHL Draft. She signed her first professional contract with the Riveters ahead of the 2020–21 NWHL Season.

After announcing she would be leaving the Riveters after one season, Tinker signed with the Toronto Six in June 2021. She would spend two seasons with the Six, being the team's recipient of the Foundation award for the 2021-22 season and being named an All-Star during the 2022-23 season. The Six would go on to win the Isobel Cup to finish the 2022-23 season, the PHF's last.

Tinker declared for the 2023 PWHL Draft, but went undrafted. She was invited to PWHL Ottawa's training camp, but ended up announcing her retirement on November 14, 2023, one day before the training camp opened.

=== International play ===
Tinker represented Canada at the 2017 Ball Hockey World Championship in Pardubice, winning gold.

Tinker played with Team Canada at the 2016 IIHF World Women's U18 Championship, winning a silver medal.

== Post-playing career ==
Following her retirement from playing, Tinker announced a new career as a hockey analyst on multiple Canadian networks. On January 31, 2024, she was announced as the Manager of Diversity, Equity and Inclusion Initiatives & Community Engagement for the PWHL.

== Personal life ==
Tinker’s father, Harvel, is Jamaican and her mother, Mandy, is Canadian-Ukrainian. She grew up in Oshawa, the eastern anchor of the Greater Toronto Area, with her three brothers. She has been outspoken against racism in hockey and has been willing to share her experiences as a multiethnic player in the predominantly white sport by sitting for a number of interviews and penning several essays regarding race and inclusion in hockey culture.

In September 2022, Tinker signed a partnership deal with hockey equipment company Sherwood. It is the first deal of its kind with a player from the PHF.

== Career statistics ==
			Regular season					Playoffs
Season	Team	League	GP	G	A	Pts	PIM	GP	G	A	Pts	PIM
2014–15	Durham West Jr. Lightning	PWHL	38	6	8	14	18	8	0	3	3	4
2015–16	Durham West Jr. Lightning	PWHL	33	4	14	18	40	10	0	7	7	9
2016–17	Yale University	NCAA	30	1	4	5	18	—	—	—	—	—
2017–18	Yale University	NCAA	31	0	4	4	46	—	—	—	—	—
2018–19	Yale University	NCAA	29	3	8	11	30	—	—	—	—	—
2019–20	Yale University	NCAA	32	1	11	12	69	—	—	—	—	—
2020–21	Metropolitan Riveters	NWHL	3	0	1	1	0	—	—	—	—	—
2021–22	Toronto Six	PHF	20	1	5	6	14	1	0	0	0	0
2022–23	Toronto Six	PHF	24	1	2	3	12	4	0	0	0	2
NWHL/PHF totals			47	2	8	10	26	5	0	0	0	2

== Awards and honors ==
- 2021 NWHL Denna Laing Award
- 2021 NWHL Foundation Award (Metropolitan Riveters representative)
- 2022 PHF Foundation Award (Toronto Six representative)
- 2023 PHF All-Star
