= Lexie Adzija =

Canadian ice hockey player (born 2000)

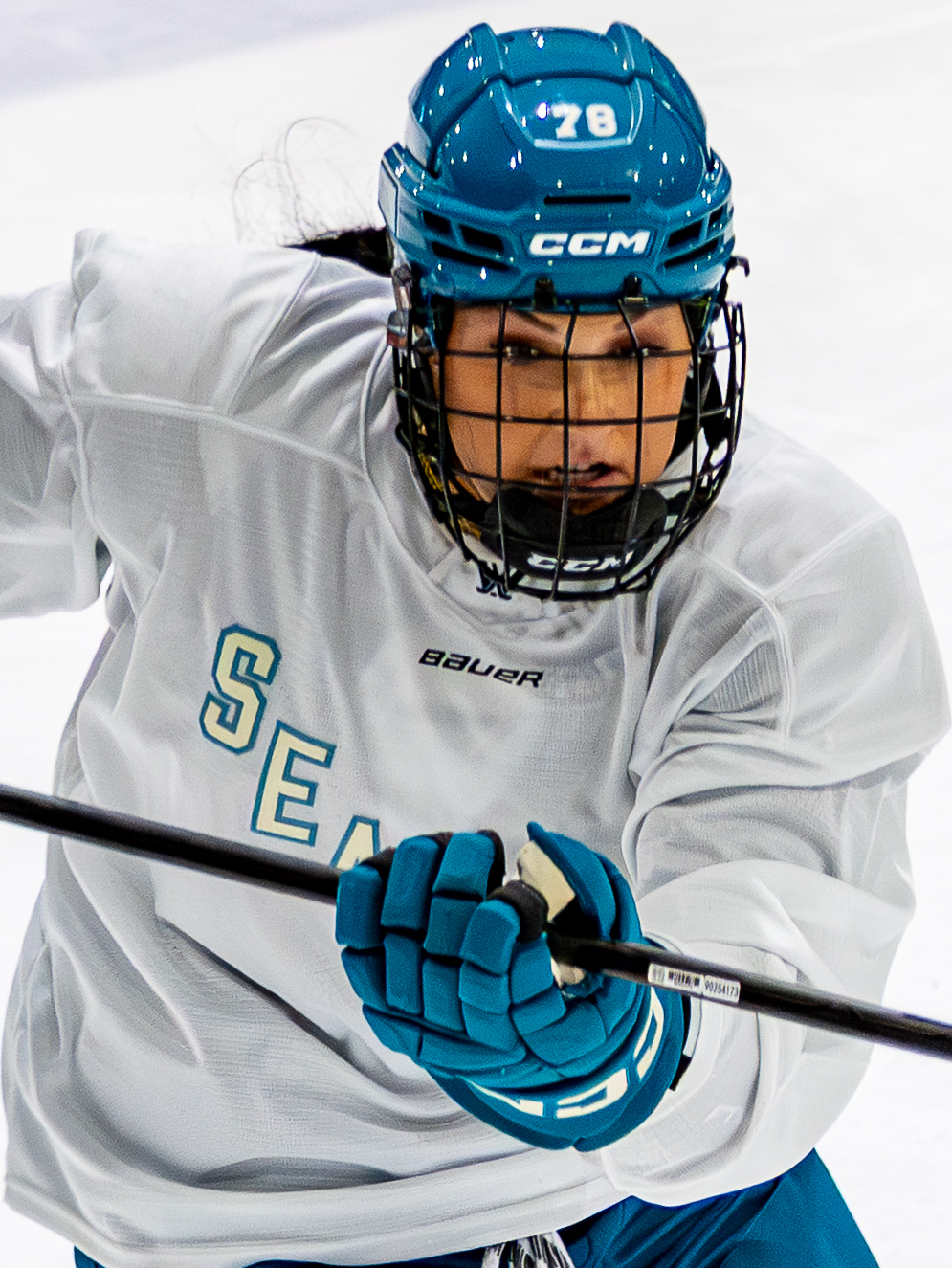
- Adzija with the Seattle Torrent in 2025
- Born: June 30, 2000 (age 26) St. Thomas, Ontario, Canada
- Height: 178 cm (5 ft 10 in)
- Weight: 74 kg (163 lb; 11 st 9 lb)
- Position: Forward
- Shoots: Left
- PWHL team Former teams: Seattle Torrent; Boston Fleet; PWHL Ottawa
- Playing career: 2018–present
Medal record
Women's ice hockey
Representing Canada
World U18 Championships
Bronze medal – third place	2018 Dmitrov

Allexis "Lexie" Adzija (LEK-see-ad-JEE-yah; born June 30, 2000) is a Canadian professional ice hockey player for the Seattle Torrent of the Professional Women's Hockey League (PWHL). She previously played for PWHL Ottawa and the Boston Fleet of the PWHL. Known for her physical play, strong faceoff skills, and two-way game, Adzija played college ice hockey at Quinnipiac University, where she served as co-captain and won the 2022 Mandi Schwartz Student-Athlete of the Year Award. She finished her collegiate career with 109 points in 151 games.

A native of St. Thomas, Ontario, Adzija represented Canada at the 2018 IIHF U18 Women's World Championship, winning a bronze medal.

Adzija was selected 65th overall by Ottawa in the 2023 PWHL Draft and became the first player drafted by the franchise to sign with the team. During the inaugural PWHL season, she was traded to Boston, where she helped the team reach the Walter Cup Finals. After one season with the Boston Fleet, she signed with the expansion Seattle Torrent in 2025. Off the ice, Adzija is a model and social media influencer, known for challenging stereotypes about female athletes.

== Early life ==
Born in St. Thomas, Ontario to parents Mandy and Rob, Adzija began skating at the age of three and decided to play hockey after watching her brother play a year later. She began playing with her local St. Thomas Jr. Stars Timbits program. At age seven, her parents gave her the opportunity to switch from boys' hockey to girls' hockey, and she joined the London Devilettes program in London, Ontario. Adzija recalled, "I remember thinking I'd rather play mini-sticks at the hotel with girls, than the boys. The St. Thomas Panthers program wasn't as big back then, so I went to London." Adzija played two full seasons with the Devilettes' junior team before moving to Oakville, Ontario to attend Appleby College, an independent international school.

While attending P.E. Trudeau elementary school in St. Thomas, Adzija was a multi-sport athlete, competing in track and field and soccer. In Grade 5, she set the junior girls' long jump record (4.17 metres) at the TVDSB track and field final meet, a record that still stands. She also helped her school's 4x100-metre relay team set meet records in both Grade 6 (intermediate) and Grade 7 (senior).

With the Oakville Hornets of the Provincial Women's Hockey League (PWHL), she became one of the league's top players, finishing third in points (46) and second in goals (25) in the 2015–16 season as one of the youngest players in the league. Over 100 career PWHL games entering the 2017–18 season, she recorded 54 goals and 51 assists. The Hornets achieved a rare "triple crown" during her time there, placing first overall in the PWHL, winning the Lower Lakes League title, and capturing the Ontario Women's Hockey Association (OWHA) championship.

== Playing career ==
=== College ===
Adzija played five seasons of US College Hockey at Quinnipiac University from 2018 to 2023, recording 43 goals and 66 assists for 109 points in 151 career games. She began her college career by being named Rookie of the Year in her freshman season (2018–19), leading all first-years in points with 18 total points. Her best offensive season came as a sophomore in 2019–20, when she scored 11 goals and 18 assists for 29 points in 34 games while leading the team in scoring.

Adzija established herself as one of the nation's premier faceoff specialists during her time at Quinnipiac. In her senior season (2021–22), she ranked fourth nationally in faceoff wins with 536 (62% winning percentage), winning 10 or more faceoffs in 36 of the team's 39 contests. As a junior in the COVID-shortened 2020–21 season, she led the Bobcats in scoring with 18 points while posting a 66% faceoff winning percentage.

Off the ice, Adzija excelled academically and in community leadership. She earned Dean's List honors every semester at Quinnipiac while completing a Bachelor of Science degree in accounting with a minor in computer information systems, followed by an MBA in May 2022. She subsequently pursued a Master of Science in Business Analytics (data analytics). She received ECAC Hockey All-Academic and All-American Scholar honors, served as chair representative of Quinnipiac's "QCoor" Community Service committee, represented women's hockey on the Student-Athlete Advisory Council, and managed fundraising for the annual Dance Marathon for Children's Miracle Network.

Adzija was awarded the prestigious 2022 Mandi Schwartz Student-Athlete of the Year Award, presented annually to the ECAC Hockey women's player who demonstrates excellence and leadership on the ice, in the classroom, and in the community. She was the fourth Bobcat to win the award. Adzija served as an assistant captain during her senior year (2021–22) and was promoted to co-captain alongside Zoe Boyd for her fifth and final season (2022–23).

Throughout her collegiate career, Adzija battled numerous injuries. During her final season, she suffered from a separated shoulder and a concussion. In her graduate season (2022–23), she led the team in powerplay goals with six and dominated in the faceoff circle, going 342–235 at the dot. She reached the 100-point career milestone with a goal against Harvard in a 5–2 road victory.

=== Professional ===
==== PWHL Ottawa (2023–24) ====
Adzija was selected 65th overall by PWHL Ottawa in the 2023 PWHL Draft. She was the first player drafted by Ottawa to be signed by the team. During the 2023 off-season, she had signed a $60,000 contract for the Metropolitan Riveters of the Premier Hockey Federation before the league folded.

==== Boston Fleet (2023–24) ====
On March 18, 2024, Adzija was traded to PWHL Boston, alongside the rights to Caitrin Lonergan, in exchange for Shiann Darkangelo, just ahead of the league's trade deadline. Prior to being traded she recorded five goals and three assists in 17 games with Ottawa, including a five-game point streak to start her professional career..

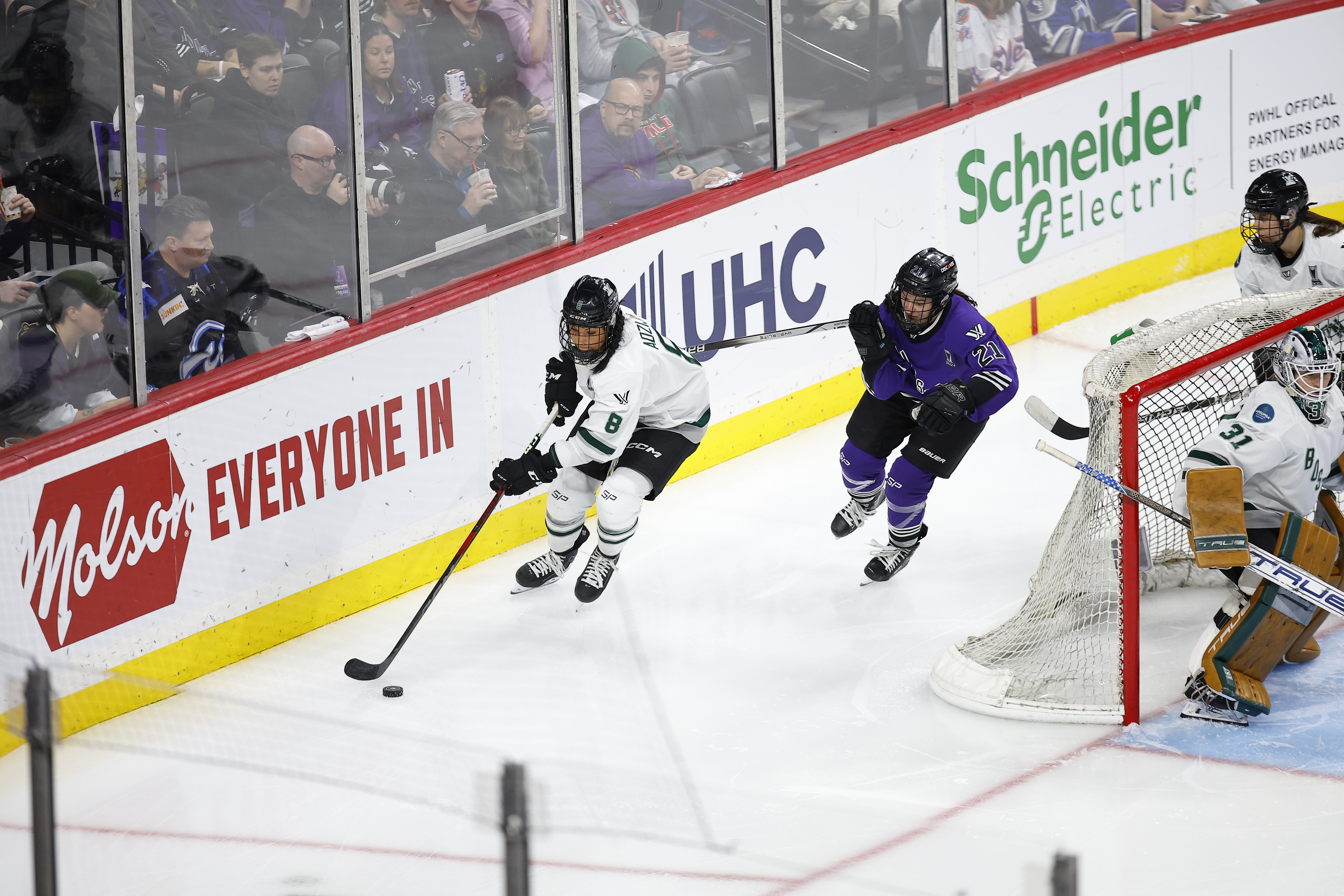
Adzija during Finals Game 3 at Xcel Arena in St. Paul, Minnesota, May 24, 2024

The trade proved fortuitous for both Adzija and Boston, as she joined the team during a critical period in their season. She recorded one goal and two assists in seven regular season games for Boston. On April 20, 2024, Adzija scored the game-winning goal against the New York Sirens at the Prudential Center, deflecting a shot from Nicole Kosta with 3:09 remaining in regulation to secure a 2–1 victory. The crucial win helped Boston surpass Ottawa for the fourth and final playoff spot with 28 points.

Boston advanced to the Walter Cup playoffs, where Adzija contributed one goal in eight playoff games as the team reached the inaugural Walter Cup Finals before falling to the Minnesota Frost in five games.

On June 21, 2024, Adzija signed a one-year contract extension with Boston. During the 2024–25 PWHL season, now rebranded as the Boston Fleet, Adzija filled a bottom-six forward role, utilizing her 5-foot-10 frame and physical play to contribute on the forecheck and penalty kill. She was second among Fleet forwards in hits (32) during the season while averaging approximately 10 minutes of ice time per game. She recorded two goals and four assists in 29 games during the regular season.

==== Seattle Torrent (2025–present) ====
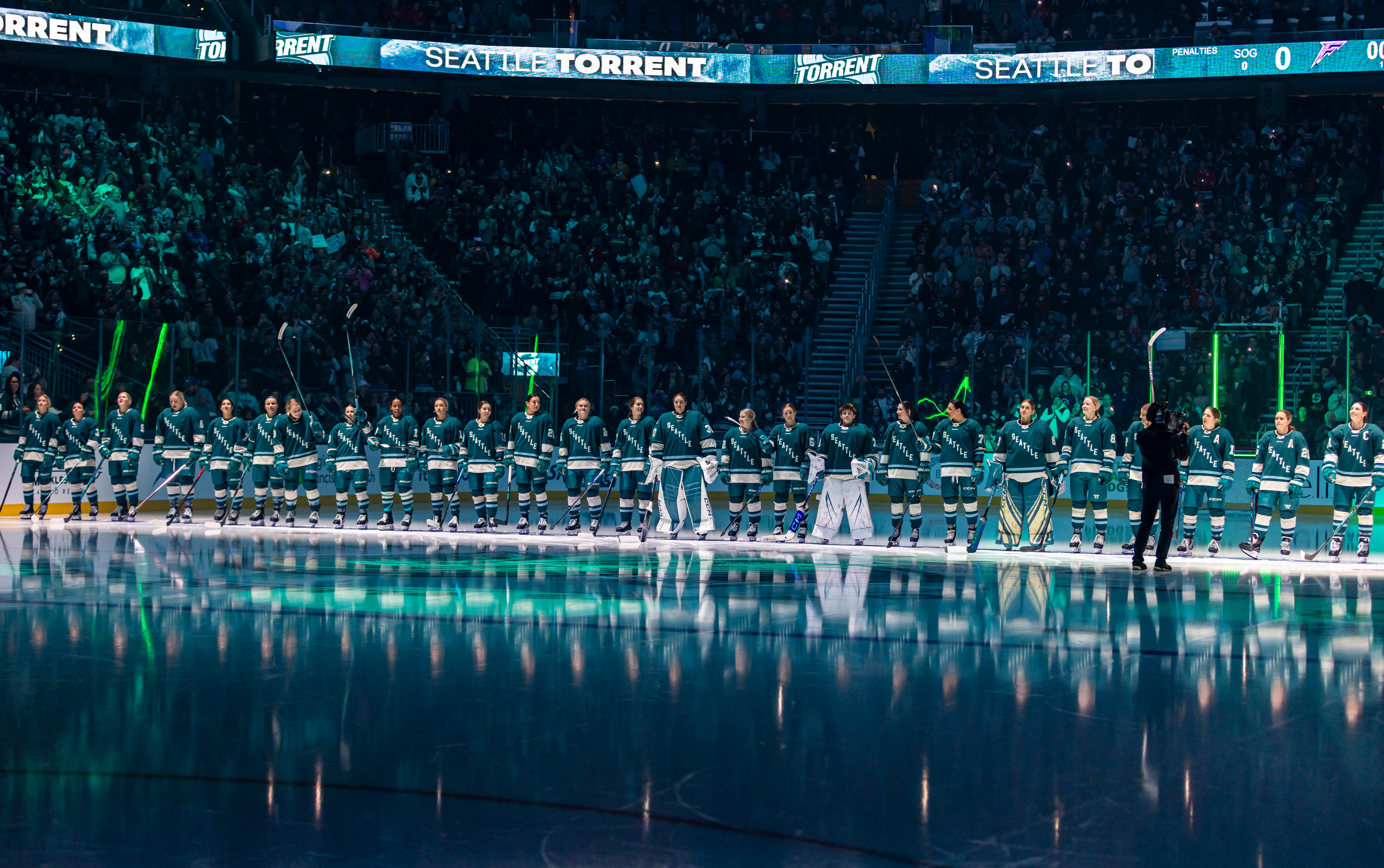
Adzija and her teammates during the Torrent's record-breaking home opener at Climate Pledge Arena, November 2025

On June 17, 2025, she signed a two-year contract with the Seattle Torrent, becoming one of the inaugural signings for the PWHL expansion franchise. Adzija appeared in the Torrent's inaugural regular season game on November 22, 2025, against the Vancouver Goldeneyes, where she recorded three shots on goal in a 4–3 overtime loss. In the team's home opener on November 28 before a record-setting crowd of 16,014 fans at Climate Pledge Arena—the largest attendance for a women's hockey game in a U.S. arena—she took an interference penalty during a 3–0 shutout loss to the Minnesota Frost. On December 3, Adzija contributed defensively with a key penalty kill play during the Torrent's first franchise win, a 2–1 comeback victory over the New York Sirens. On December 28, Adzija scored her first goal for the Torrent at 1:47 of the third period in a 4–3 loss to the New York Sirens in Dallas as part of the PWHL Takeover Tour. The goal was assisted by Mikyla Grant-Mentis and Lyndie Lobdell. On January 20, 2026, Adzija scored Seattle's first shorthanded goal in franchise history at 2:28 of the third period in the Torrent's 6–4 victory over Toronto, in the highest-scoring game of the PWHL season. The goal triggered the PWHL's "jailbreak" rule and gave Seattle the lead for good. The Torrent's six goals set a franchise record and matched the season high for any PWHL team.

=== International ===
==== Junior ====
Adzija represented Canada at the international youth level on multiple occasions. She was a two-time gold medalist with Team Ontario Red at the Canada National Women's U18 Championship in 2016 and 2017. At the 2016 Championship, she tied for the team lead in goals with four, and at the November 2017 Championship in Quebec City, she produced six goals and four assists in 10 games for Team Ontario Red's gold medal-winning team.

Adzija also participated in the 2017 Summer Series with Hockey Canada. In 2016, at age 16, she was invited to Team Canada's U18 camp but was not selected for the final roster. However, she used this as motivation, later reflecting, "I got cut last year, so bouncing back, being able to be resilient and have the work ethic to bounce back after that and come out stronger." Her strong performance at the 2017 National Championship, combined with her play with the Oakville Hornets, caught the attention of Hockey Canada scouts. She also took part in a three-game series between Canada and the United States in Lake Placid, New York in August 2017.

In November 2017, Hockey Canada named her to the 2018 IIHF U18 Women's World Championship squad that competed in Dmitrov, Russia in January 2018. Three of her Oakville Hornets teammates—forward Sarah Fillier, goalie Mady MacArthur, and defenceman Emily Rickwood—joined her on the team, making Oakville the most represented club team at the tournament. Canada won the bronze medal at the tournament.

==== Senior ====
Following her college career, Adzija continued to be involved with Hockey Canada's national team programs. In August 2022, she was selected to Hockey Canada's National Women's Development Team (NWDT) for a series against the United States in late August.

In September 2023, prior to the inaugural PWHL season, Adzija attended Canada's National Women's Team senior camp in St. Catharines, Ontario. This invitation was particularly meaningful as she had missed over half of her final college season due to injury and was uncertain about her draft prospects. She later stated, "I was fortunate enough to get a Hockey Canada invite and attend their camp in September, so I think that maybe helped me a little bit" in terms of her draft stock. Ottawa general manager Mike Hirshfeld noted that she was "a younger player who is emerging on the Canadian national level."

In August 2024, Adzija was invited to Canada's National Women's Team Fall Festival training camp among 48 players selected, representing the Boston Fleet.

== Personal life ==
Outside of hockey, Adzija is a model. Her father put an artificial ice rink in her family's barn in St. Thomas so she can practice when she's home.

She is engaged to Tennessee Titans wide receiver Chimere Dike.

== Career statistics ==
			Regular season					Playoffs
Season	Team	League	GP	G	A	Pts	PIM	GP	G	A	Pts	PIM
2013–14	London Jr. Devilettes	Prov. WHL	2	0	0	0	0	—	—	—	—	—
2014–15	London Jr. Devilettes	Prov. WHL	34	19	15	34	20	3	0	0	0	2
2015–16	London Jr. Devilettes	Prov. WHL	38	25	21	46	22	7	5	1	6	6
2016–17	Oakville Jr. Hornets	Prov. WHL	26	10	15	25	20	12	5	5	10	2
2017–18	Oakville Jr. Hornets	Prov. WHL	26	10	8	18	10	8	4	2	6	4
2018–19	Quinnipiac Bobcats	NCAA	36	7	11	18	18	—	—	—	—	—
2019–20	Quinnipiac Bobcats	NCAA	34	11	18	29	16	—	—	—	—	—
2020–21	Quinnipiac Bobcats	NCAA	16	6	12	18	2	—	—	—	—	—
2021–22	Quinnipiac Bobcats	NCAA	39	8	20	28	10	—	—	—	—	—
2022–23	Quinnipiac Bobcats	NCAA	26	11	5	16	4	—	—	—	—	—
2023–24	PWHL Ottawa	PWHL	17	5	3	8	4	—	—	—	—	—
2023–24	PWHL Boston	PWHL	7	1	2	3	2	8	1	0	1	7
2024–25	Boston Fleet	PWHL	29	2	4	6	6	—	—	—	—	—
2025–26	Seattle Torrent	PWHL	30	4	1	5	10	—	—	—	—	—
PWHL totals			83	12	10	22	22	8	1	0	1	7

== Honors and awards ==
College

- ECAC Hockey Mandi Schwartz Student-Athlete of the Year (2022)
- ECAC Hockey All-Academic Team
- All-American Scholar
- Dean's List (every semester at Quinnipiac)
- Quinnipiac Bobcats Rookie of the Year (2018–19)
