= Emma Maltais =

Canadian ice hockey player (born 1999)

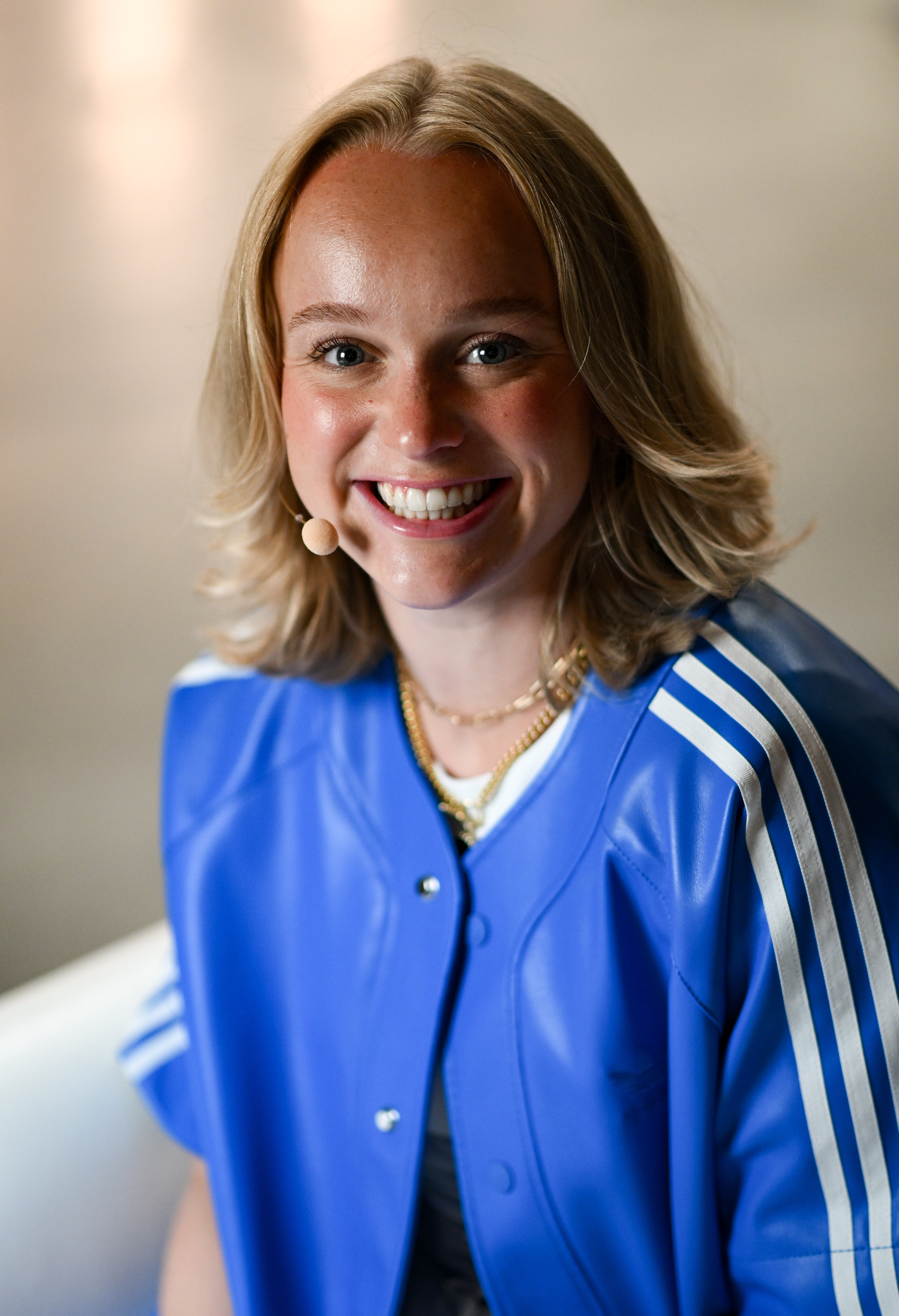
- Maltais in 2024
- Born: November 4, 1999 (age 27) Cambridge, Massachusetts, U.S.
- Height: 163 cm (5 ft 4 in)
- Position: Forward
- Shoots: Left
- PWHL team Former teams: Montréal Victoire; Toronto Sceptres
- National team: Canada
- Playing career: 2023–present
Medal record
Women's ice hockey
Representing Canada
Olympic Games
Gold medal – first place	2022 Beijing	Team
Silver medal – second place	2026 Milano Cortina	Team
World Championships
Gold medal – first place	2021 Canada
Gold medal – first place	2022 Denmark
Gold medal – first place	2024 United States
Silver medal – second place	2023 Canada
Silver medal – second place	2025 Czechia
Silver medal – second place	2026 Denmark
World U18 Championships
Silver medal – second place	2016 Canada
Silver medal – second place	2017 Czech Republic

Emma Maltais (born November 4, 1999) is a Canadian professional ice hockey player who is a forward for the Montréal Victoire of the Professional Women's Hockey League (PWHL) and member of the Canadian national team.

== Playing career ==
=== Youth and junior ===
Growing up in southern Ontario, Maltais began skating at the age of two and began playing hockey at the age of four. During high school, she played for the Oakville Jr. Hornets in the Provincial Women's Hockey League (Prov. WHL), where she served as team captain in the 2016–17 season, a season in which she was the league's leading scorer and the Hornets won a 'triple crown' of first place finishes in the regular season, league playoffs, and provincial championship. Her career totals of 55 goals and 92 assists are among the most in Prov. WHL history, and her 147 points are the most in Hornets history.

=== College ===
Having committed to Ohio State University as a high school freshman, she played her first season with the Buckeyes in the 2017–18 season. She scored 40 points in 37 games during her rookie NCAA season, leading the Western Collegiate Hockey Association (WCHA) in points-per-game and breaking the record for most WCHA Rookie of the Month awards, winning four times.

Her production increased to 43 points in 35 games the following season, again leading Ohio State in scoring and being named to the All-WCHA First Team.

In the 2019–20 season, she set an Ohio State record for points with 59 points in 38 games, picking up her 100th collegiate point against Bemidji State University on November 2, 2019. That year, she was a top-10 finalist for the Patty Kazmaier Memorial Award and was named to the All-WCHA First Team for the third consecutive season.

In her senior year, the 2020–21 season, Maltais recorded five goals and 16 points in 20 games, leading the Buckeyes with 11 assists. She recorded her 100th career assist against the University of Minnesota on January 29, 2021. She set a Buckeyes record for career playoff points with 14, and for the second consecutive season she was a top-10 finalist for the Patty Kazmaier Award.

For the 2021–22 season, Maltais was centralized with the Canadian national team.

Returning to Ohio State in the 2022–23 season, Maltais recorded 48 points in 39 games, becoming the first Ohio State player to reach 200 career points.

=== Professional ===
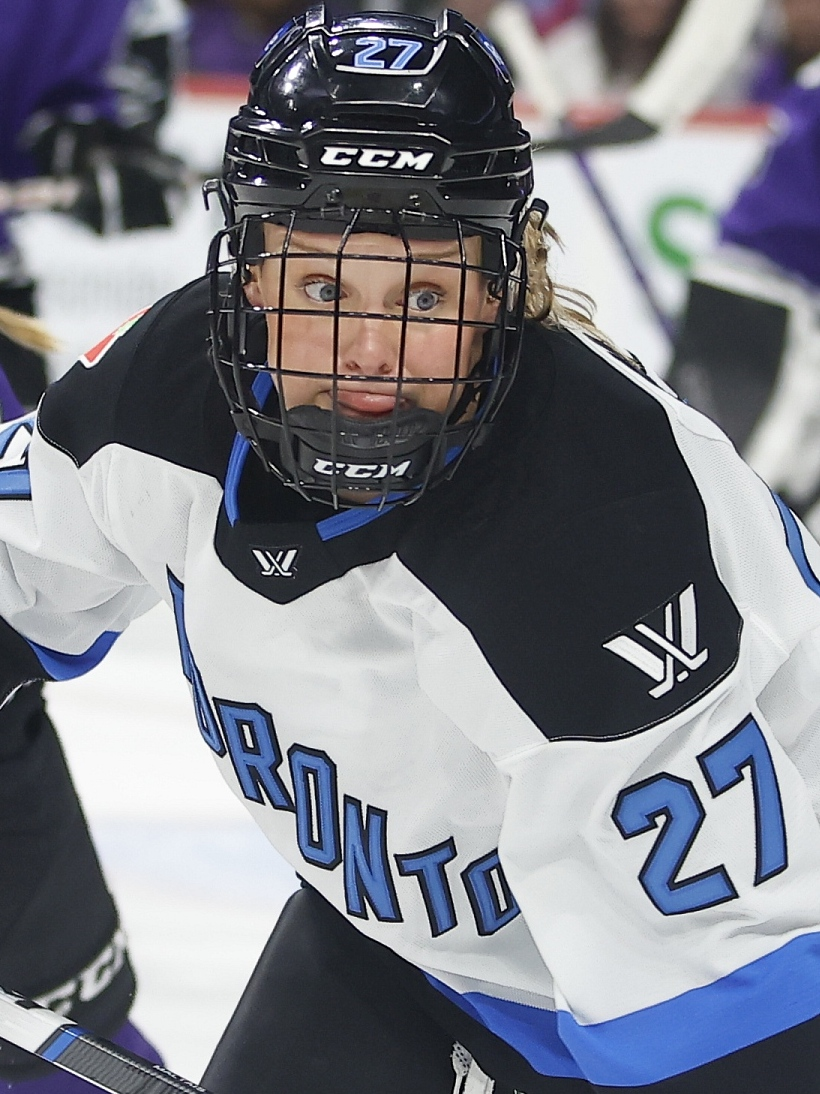
Maltais with PWHL Toronto in 2024

One of the youngest players entering the inaugural draft of the newly-created Professional Women's Hockey League (PWHL), Maltais was selected in the second round, 11th overall by Toronto. On January 5, 2024, she scored her first PWHL goal, a shorthanded game-winning goal in a 3–2 victory over New York to secure the first win in franchise history. With the goal, she became the first player to invoke the league's 'jailbreak' rule, where a minor penalty ends after a shorthanded goal is scored. Totaling four goals and nineteen points and playing on Toronto's power play and penalty kill, Maltais was recognized one of the league's top first-year professionals, earning All-Rookie team honors and a nomination for Rookie of the Year. On June 23, 2026, it was announced that she had joined the Montréal Victoire on a two-year contract.

== International play ==
Maltais represented Canada at the 2016 and 2017 IIHF World Women's U18 Championship, scoring a total of nine points in ten games and winning silver twice.

She was named to the senior national team roster for the first time in 2019, suiting up for the 2019-20 Rivalry Series against the United States. In May 2021, she was one of 28 players invited to Hockey Canada's Centralization Camp, which represents the selection process for the Canadian women's team that shall compete in Ice hockey at the 2022 Winter Olympics.

On January 11, 2022, Maltais was named to Canada's 2022 Olympic team.

On January 9, 2026, she was named to Canada's roster to compete at the 2026 Winter Olympics.

== Personal life ==
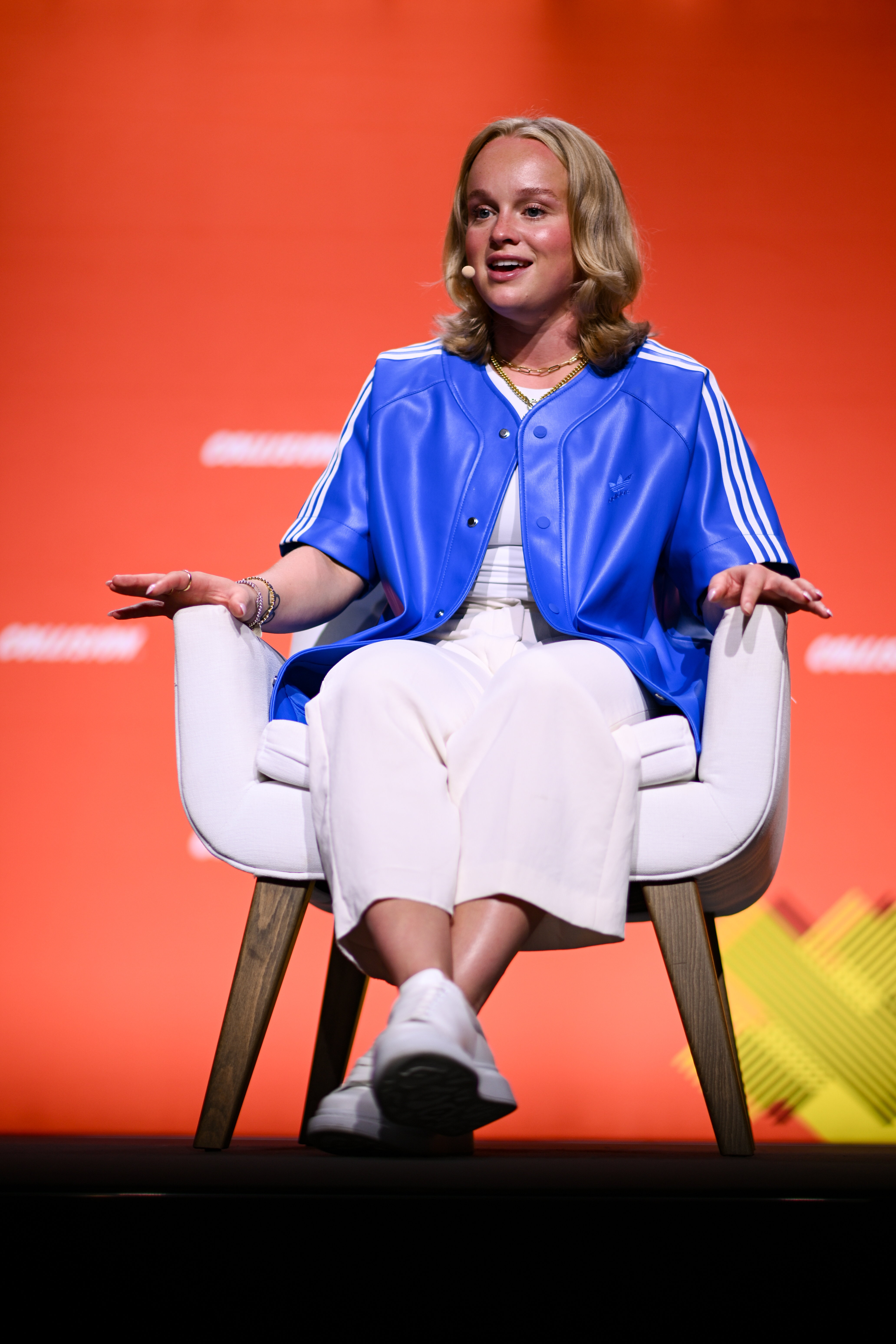
Maltais at Collision 2024 by Web Summit in Toronto

Maltais was born in Cambridge, Massachusetts, while her father was working on the Big Dig, and moved to Burlington, Ontario before her first birthday.

Maltais studied health sciences at Ohio State University and has interned at the Ohio State Neurological Institute.

== Career statistics ==
=== Regular season and playoffs ===
			Regular season					Playoffs
Season	Team	League	GP	G	A	Pts	PIM	GP	G	A	Pts	PIM
2012–13	Oakville Jr. Hornets	Prov. WHL	8	1	2	3	0	2	0	1	1	0
2013–14	Oakville Jr. Hornets	Prov. WHL	5	1	4	5	4	—	—	—	—	—
2014–15	Oakville Jr. Hornets	Prov. WHL	37	21	33	54	23	12	2	4	6	6
2015–16	Oakville Jr. Hornets	Prov. WHL	21	11	21	32	4	7	3	4	7	0
2016–17	Oakville Jr. Hornets	Prov. WHL	34	22	34	56	12	12	4	11	15	10
2017–18	Ohio State University	WCHA	37	16	24	40	14	—	—	—	—	—
2018–19	Ohio State University	WCHA	35	15	28	43	6	—	—	—	—	—
2019–20	Ohio State University	WCHA	38	19	40	59	8	—	—	—	—	—
2020–21	Ohio State University	WCHA	20	5	11	16	8	—	—	—	—	—
2022–23	Ohio State University	WCHA	39	11	37	48	16	—	—	—	—	—
2023–24	PWHL Toronto	PWHL	24	4	15	19	16	5	1	1	2	2
2024–25	Toronto Sceptres	PWHL	30	4	5	9	14	4	1	3	4	0
2025–26	Toronto Sceptres	PWHL	30	3	7	10	24	—	—	—	—	—
PWHL totals			84	11	27	38	54	9	2	4	6	2

=== International ===
Year	Team	Event	Result	GP	G	A	Pts	PIM
2016	Canada	U18	2nd place, silver medalist(s)	5	1	5	6	2
2017	Canada	U18	2nd place, silver medalist(s)	5	0	3	3	4
2021	Canada	WC	1st place, gold medalist(s)	5	0	0	0	0
2022	Canada	OG	1st place, gold medalist(s)	7	1	1	2	4
2022	Canada	WC	1st place, gold medalist(s)	7	1	2	3	2
2023	Canada	WC	2nd place, silver medalist(s)	7	0	1	1	0
2024	Canada	WC	1st place, gold medalist(s)	7	2	1	3	2
2025	Canada	WC	2nd place, silver medalist(s)	7	1	2	3	6
2026	Canada	OG	2nd place, silver medalist(s)	7	0	2	2	4
Junior totals				10	1	8	9	6
Senior totals				47	5	9	14	18

== Awards and honours ==
Award	Year	Ref
National Women's Under-18 Championship
Top Forward	2016	
Prov. WHL
Scoring Champion	2017	
College
WCHA Rookie of the Year	2018	
USCHO All-Rookie Team	2018	
First Team All-WCHA	2018, 2019, 2020	
WCHA All-Rookie Team	2018	
OSU Scholar Athlete	2018, 2019, 2020, 2021	
WCHA Scholar Athlete	2019, 2020	
WCHA All-Academic Team	2019, 2020, 2021	
Academic All-Big Ten	2019, 2020, 2021	
USCHO Third Team All-American	2020, 2021	
AHCA Second Team All-American	2020	
Second Team All-WCHA	2023	
PWHL
All-Rookie Team	2024	
