= Toronto Jr. Aeros =

- City: Toronto, Ontario, Canada
- League: Ontario Women's Hockey League
- Founded: 1991; 2004 (OWHL franchise)
- Home arena: Vaughan Sportsplex
- Colours: Black, red, white
- General manager: Tim Sarna
- Head coach: Navinder Biln

Championships
- Regular season titles: 6 (2004–05, 2005–06, 2006–07, 2008–09, 2011–12, 2017–18)
- League champions: 7 (2004–05, 2005–06, 2006–07, 2009–10, 2010–11, 2015–16, 2017–18)
- Provincial champions (since 2004): 5 (2004–05, 2005–06, 2009–10, 2015–16, 2017–18)

The Toronto Jr. Aeros are a women's junior ice hockey team based in Toronto, Ontario, Canada. They are members of the Ontario Women's Hockey League (OWHL). The Aeros are six-time OWHL regular season champions, seven-time OWHL playoff champions, and five-time Ontario Intermediate AA champions. On three occasions (2005, 2006, 2018) they won all three titles in one season.

== Tradition ==
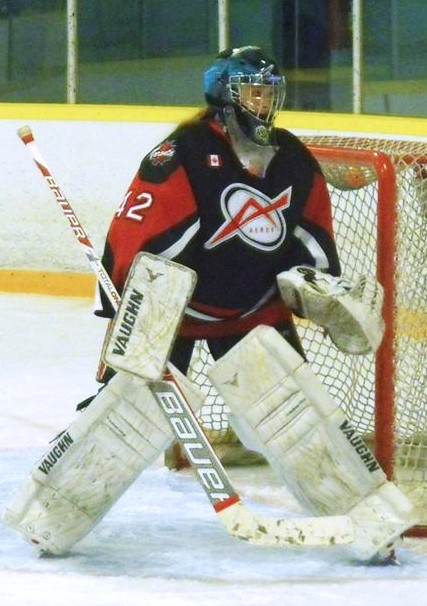
Aeros goalie during 2013-14 season.

The Senior Toronto Aeros were founded in 1974 and existed until the folding of the National Women's Hockey League in 2007 (which it joined in 1999). The Aeros program raised up both of the two only Canadian female players in the Hockey Hall of Fame: Angela James and Geraldine Heaney.

The Toronto Jr. Aeros were founded in 1991 and entered the Provincial Women's Hockey League at its inception in 2004. The Midget Aeros, affiliated with the Junior Aeros, were founded in 2001. Currently, the Aeros only operate a Midget and Junior team.

== History ==
The Junior Aeros entered the Provincial Women's Hockey League during its first season, 2004–05, and won its regular-season championship as well as the Alumni Cup as the league's playoff champion. The Jr. Aeros also won the OWHA Intermediate AA Championship tournament to complete the triple crown.

The 2005–06 season saw the Aeros double the feat, if not better it, by finishing the regular season with an undefeated (27–0–3) record. The Aeros also did not lose a game during the league playoffs. Future Canadian Olympian Haley Irwin was a star on the team those first two seasons. Irwin was named team most valuable player each of those seasons before being picked up by the NCAA Division I Minnesota–Duluth Bulldogs. Courtney Birchard was a member of the Jr. Aeros lineup during the first two seasons before jumping to the New Hampshire Wildcats of ECAC Hockey. Also, Christina Kessler starred in net for the Aeros during the 2005–06 season before jumping to the Harvard Crimson hockey team. During Kessler's season with the team, she and Jamie Miller combined for the lowest goals-against average in the PWHL.

Goalie Jamie Miller either led or co-led the PWHL in each of the league's first three seasons. Miller spent a season with the Division I Quinnipiac Bobcats and is now a member of the Canadian Women's Hockey League's Brampton Hockey Team. During the 2006–07 season, the Jr. Aeros won their third straight regular season championship and their third straight league playoff championship, but were upset in the preliminary round of the OWHA Provincials by the Aurora Jr. Panthers to deny them their third straight triple crown.

== Season-by-season results ==
Season	GP	W	L	T	OTL	GF	GA	Pts	Finish	Playoffs	OWHA's
2004-05	30	23	5	2	-	105	45	48	1st PWHL	Won League (Stoney Creek)	Won Gold (Windsor)
2005-06	30	27	0	3	-	137	28	57	1st PWHL	Won League (Stoney Creek)	Won Gold (Durham West)
2006-07	32	22	6	4	-	111	41	48	1st PWHL	Won League (Durham West)	Lost Preliminary (Aurora)
2007-08	32	22	9	1	-	131	66	45	3rd PWHL	5th Place (Aurora)	Lost Preliminary (Stoney Creek)
2008-09	34	27	5	2	-	138	62	56	1st PWHL	Lost Final (Ottawa)	Won Bronze (Durham West)
2009-10	34	29	2	2	1	163	38	61	2nd PWHL	Won League (Mississauga)	Won Gold (Bluewater)
2010-11	36	26	6	1	3	150	58	56	3rd PWHL	Won League (Mississauga)	Won Silver (Mississauga)
2011-12	34	31	1	1	1	136	31	64	1st PWHL	Lost Final (Bluewater)	Won Silver (Bluewater)
2012-13	38	27	9	2	0	118	68	56	5th PWHL	Won Bronze (Mississauga)	Lost Preliminary (Mississauga)
2013-14	38	29	5	3	1	142	68	62	3rd PWHL	Lost Bronze (Nepean)	Won Silver (Mississauga)
2014-15	38	28	6	4	0	156	59	60	T2nd PWHL	Lost Bronze (Oakville)	Lost Bronze (Whitby)
2015-16	38	24	7	7	0	112	55	55	T4th PWHL	Won League (Mississauga)	Won Gold (Oakville)
2016-17	38	26	8	2	2	87	40	56	3rd PWHL	Lost Final (Oakville)	

== Professional and National Team alumni ==
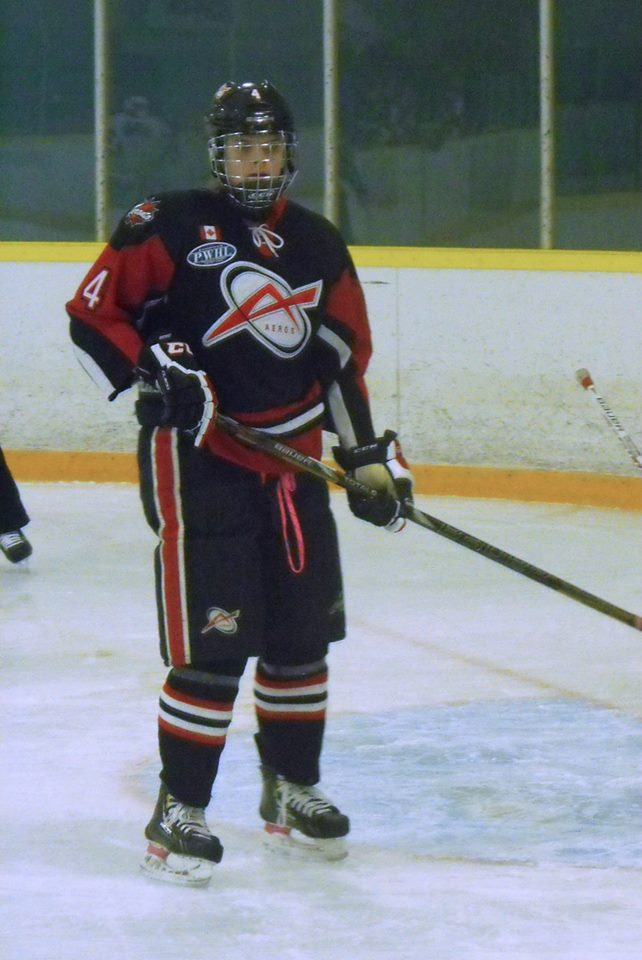
Aeros player during 2013-14 season.

- Courtney Birchard
- Celine Frappier
- Haley Irwin
- Christina Kessler
- Jamie Miller
- Jillian Saulnier
- Sonja van der Bliek
