= Mississauga Jr. Hurricanes =

- City: Mississauga, Ontario, Canada
- League: Ontario Women's Hockey League
- Founded: 2004 (OWHL franchise)
- Home arena: Iceland Arena
- Colours: Blue, yellow, and white
- Head coach: Darcy Breakey

Franchise history
- 2004–2019: Mississauga Jr. Chiefs
- 2019–present: Mississauga Jr. Hurricanes

The Mississauga Jr. Hurricanes are a Canadian junior women's ice hockey team based in Mississauga, Ontario. The Jr. Hurricanes are members of the Provincial Women's Hockey League of the Ontario Women's Hockey Association. They are two-time regular season champions, three-time Alumni Cup playoff runners-up, and three-time Ontario Intermediate AA champions. They were originally known as the Mississauga Jr. Chiefs from 2004 to 2019 and were part of the same organization that operated the senior Mississauga Chiefs in the Canadian Women's Hockey League.

== History ==
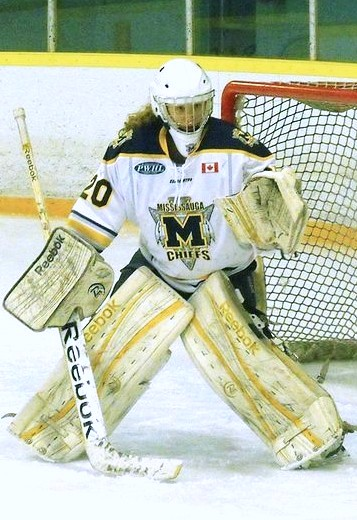
Chiefs goalie during 2013–14 season.

The Mississauga Jr. Chiefs were the named for the professional Mississauga Chiefs, who were part of the same organization that operated women's and girls' hockey teams across various levels of play. The professional senior Chiefs ceased operations in 2010, but the minor hockey and junior teams kept the name.

On January 31, 2010, the Jr. Chiefs hosted the China women's national ice hockey team in front of a sold-out crowd. The Chiefs won the game 4–1, despite China being ranked the seventh best senior national team in the world and on their way to the 2010 Winter Olympics.

The Jr. Chiefs finished 2010–11 in first place with 33 wins and only 3 losses. They would lose the Alumni Cup final to the Toronto Jr. Aeros, but avenged the loss by beating them to close out the season and win gold at the OWHA Intermediate AA provincials. At provincials, the Chiefs finished second in their pool with a 2–1 record behind the London Jr. Devilettes. Their record got them into a quarter-final qualifying game, in which they beat the Durham West Jr. Lightning 3–0. In the quarter-final, the Chiefs beat the Bluewater Jr. Hawks 3–2. In the semi-final, they were victorious again, edging the Whitby Jr. Wolves 1–0. In the finals, the Chiefs answered back for their Alumni Cup loss with a 7-2 shellacking of the Jr. Aeros.

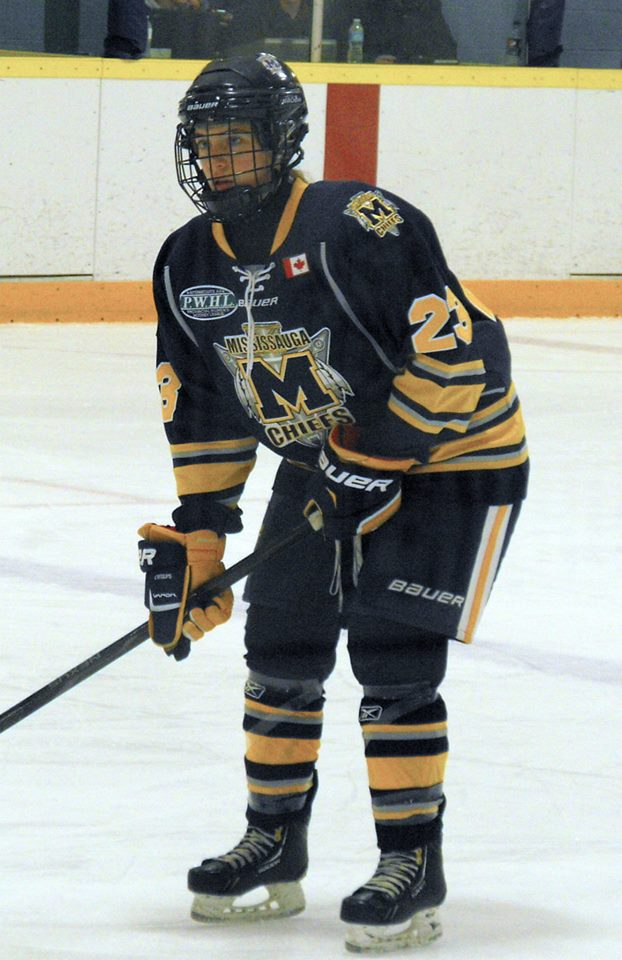
Chiefs player during 2014–15 season.

On September 11, 2012, the Jr. Chiefs hosted the China women's national ice hockey team for an exhibition game. China won the game 2–1 in an overtime shootout.

The Jr. Chiefs finished the 2013–14 season 2 points out of first place, behind the Nepean Jr. Wildcats, with 32 wins, 5 losses, and a tie. Victoria Bach led the way with 36 goals and 32 assists to lead the Chiefs and the PWHL in scoring. In the qualifier round, the Jr. Chiefs swept the Burlington Jr. Barracudas 3-games-to-none to secure their spot in the Alumni Cup playoffs. The Chiefs finished first in Pool B with a perfect 3-0-0 record. In the quarter-final, the Chiefs beat the Bluewater Jr. Hawks 3–1. Then in the semi-final, the Chiefs edged the Toronto Jr. Aeros 2–1 in an overtime shootout. The finals did not go as planned, as the 2013 Champion Whitby Jr. Wolves stole the show with a 2-1 double overtime victory over the Chiefs. Afterwards, the Chiefs participated in the OWHA Intermediate AA championships. The Chiefs took first place in Pool B with a 2–1–0 record. In the quarter-final, the Chiefs beat the Waterloo KW Rangers 5–3. In the semi-final, the Chiefs defeated the Durham West Jr. Lightning 3–2 to earn a shot at the final. In the final, the Chiefs dispatched the Toronto Jr. Aeros 5–2 to win their third OWHA Championship as representatives from the PWHL.

Prior to the 2019–20 season, the Jr. Chiefs rebranded as the Jr. Hurricanes.

== Season-by-season results ==
| Season | GP | W | L | T | OTL | GF | GA | Pts | Finish | Playoffs | OWHA's |
| 2004-05 | 30 | 14 | 12 | 4 | - | 84 | 59 | 32 | 7th PWHL | Lost Cons. Final (Aurora) | Lost quarter-final (Toronto) |
| 2005-06 | 30 | 17 | 10 | 3 | - | 84 | 64 | 37 | 6th PWHL | Won Cons. Final (Cambridge) | |
| 2006-07 | 32 | 14 | 16 | 2 | - | 101 | 88 | 30 | 10th PWHL | Lost Cons. SF (Windsor) | Won Bronze (Durham West) |
| 2007-08 | 32 | 26 | 4 | 2 | - | 118 | 46 | 54 | 2nd PWHL | Won Bronze (Durham West) | Won Bronze (Aurora) |
| 2008-09 | 34 | 23 | 4 | 7 | - | 113 | 61 | 53 | 3rd PWHL | Lost quarter-final (Durham West) | Won Gold (Stoney Creek) |
| 2009-10 | 34 | 29 | 2 | 3 | 0 | 162 | 48 | 61 | 1st PWHL | Lost final (Toronto) | Won Bronze (Brampton) |
| 2010-11 | 36 | 33 | 3 | 0 | 0 | 161 | 36 | 66 | 1st PWHL | Lost final (Toronto) | Won Gold (Toronto) |
| 2011-12 | 34 | 20 | 7 | 6 | 1 | 92 | 59 | 47 | 6th PWHL | Won Bronze (Aurora) | Won Bronze (Burlington) |
| 2012-13 | 38 | 28 | 7 | 3 | 0 | 147 | 63 | 59 | 2nd PWHL | Lost Bronze (Toronto) | Lost final (Durham West) |
| 2013-14 | 38 | 32 | 5 | 1 | 0 | 133 | 51 | 65 | 2nd PWHL | Lost final (Whitby) | Won Gold (Toronto) |
| 2014-15 | 38 | 24 | 6 | 7 | 1 | 107 | 52 | 56 | 5th PWHL | | |

== Professional and National Team alumni ==
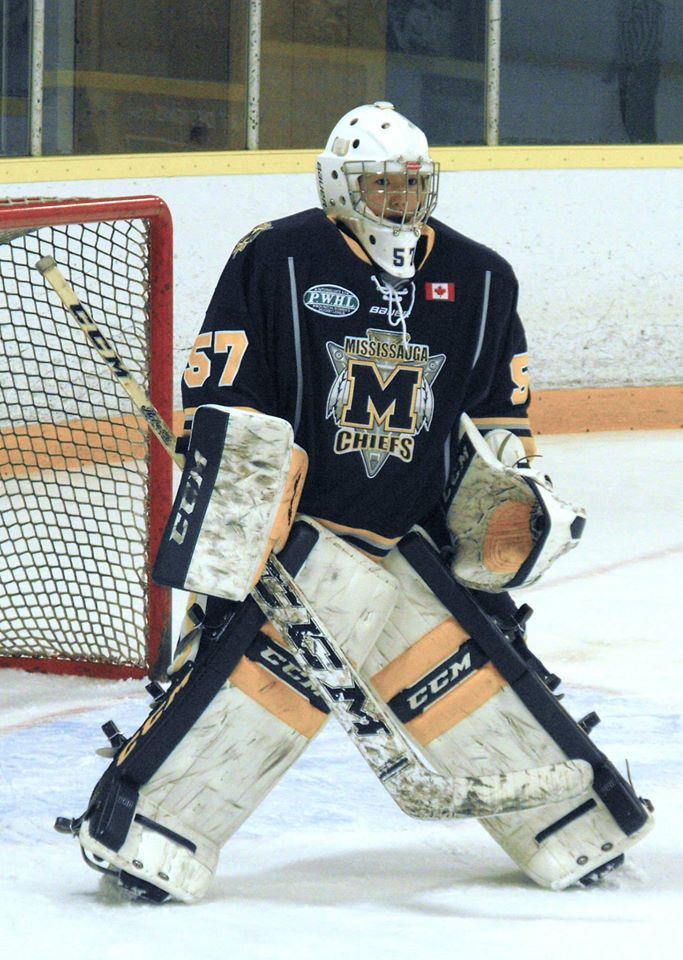
Chiefs goalie during 2014–15 season.

- Alyssa Baldin
- Laura McIntosh
- Catherine White
