= London Jr. Devilettes =

- City: London, Ontario, Canada
- League: Ontario Women's Hockey League
- Home arena: London Sports Park
- Colours: Red, green, white
- Website: londondevilettes.ca

Championships
- Regular season titles: 0
- League champions: 2 (2018–19, 2022–23)
- Provincial champions (since 2004): 1 (2018–19)

The London Jr. Devilettes are a women's junior ice hockey team based in London, Ontario, Canada. They are members of the Ontario Women's Hockey League.

== History ==
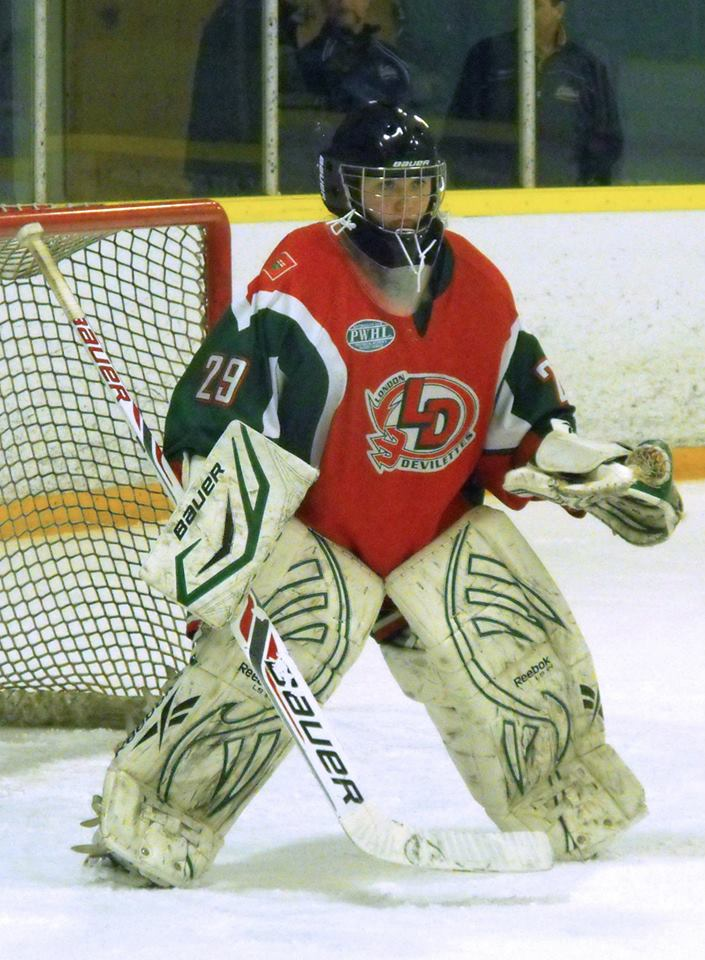
A Devilettes goalie during the 2013–14 season

In 2013, the sixth-seeded Devilettes reached the league semifinals for the first time. Trailing by one late in the semifinal match against the Mississauga Jr. Chiefs, Brittany Howard scored with one second left to send the game to overtime, where they would win 4–3. In the finals, they lost 2–1 to the Whitby Jr. Wolves.

A Devilettes team featuring Julia Gosling won both the league and provincial titles in the 2018–19 season, with forward Maggie McKee winning the league scoring title for the second year in a row. Both players moved on to college ice hockey the following season.

The 2022–23 Devilettes won the league championship, defeating the Wolves 3–2 in the finals. The 2023–24 Devilettes saw five players make Team Canada for the 2023 World U18 Championship, the most in franchise history.

== Notable alumni ==
(Canada) denotes senior national team alumnus

- Lexie Adzija – PWHL Ottawa, PWHL Boston
- (Canada) Julia Gosling – Toronto Sceptres
- (Canada) Katelyn Gosling – Calgary Inferno
- (Canada) Nicole Gosling – Montreal Victoire
- (Canada) Brittany Howard – Toronto Furies, Toronto Six, PWHL Toronto
- (Canada) Ella Shelton – PWHL New York
