= Ontario Women's Hockey League =

Junior ice hockey league in Ontario, Canada

- Sport: Ice hockey
- Founded: 2004; 22 years ago
- CEO: Fran Rider, OWHA
- No. of teams: 20
- Country: Canada
- Most recent champion: Stoney Creek Sabres (3)
- Most titles: Toronto Jr. Aeros (7)
- Website: OWHL official site

The Ontario Women's Hockey League U22 Elite (OWHL), formerly the Provincial Women's Hockey League, is a women's junior ice hockey league in Ontario, Canada. Founded in 2004, it is considered to be the highest level of amateur women's ice hockey in Ontario, and is sanctioned by Hockey Canada and the Ontario Women's Hockey Association.

OWHL alumni have gone on to play in the Professional Women's Hockey League, National Collegiate Athletic Association, and U Sports, and for the Canadian national team.

== History ==
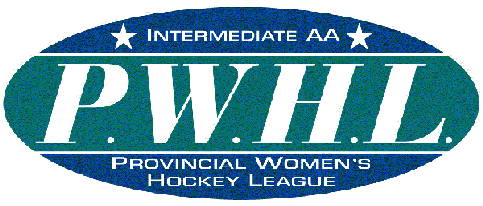
Former Provincial Women's Hockey League logo

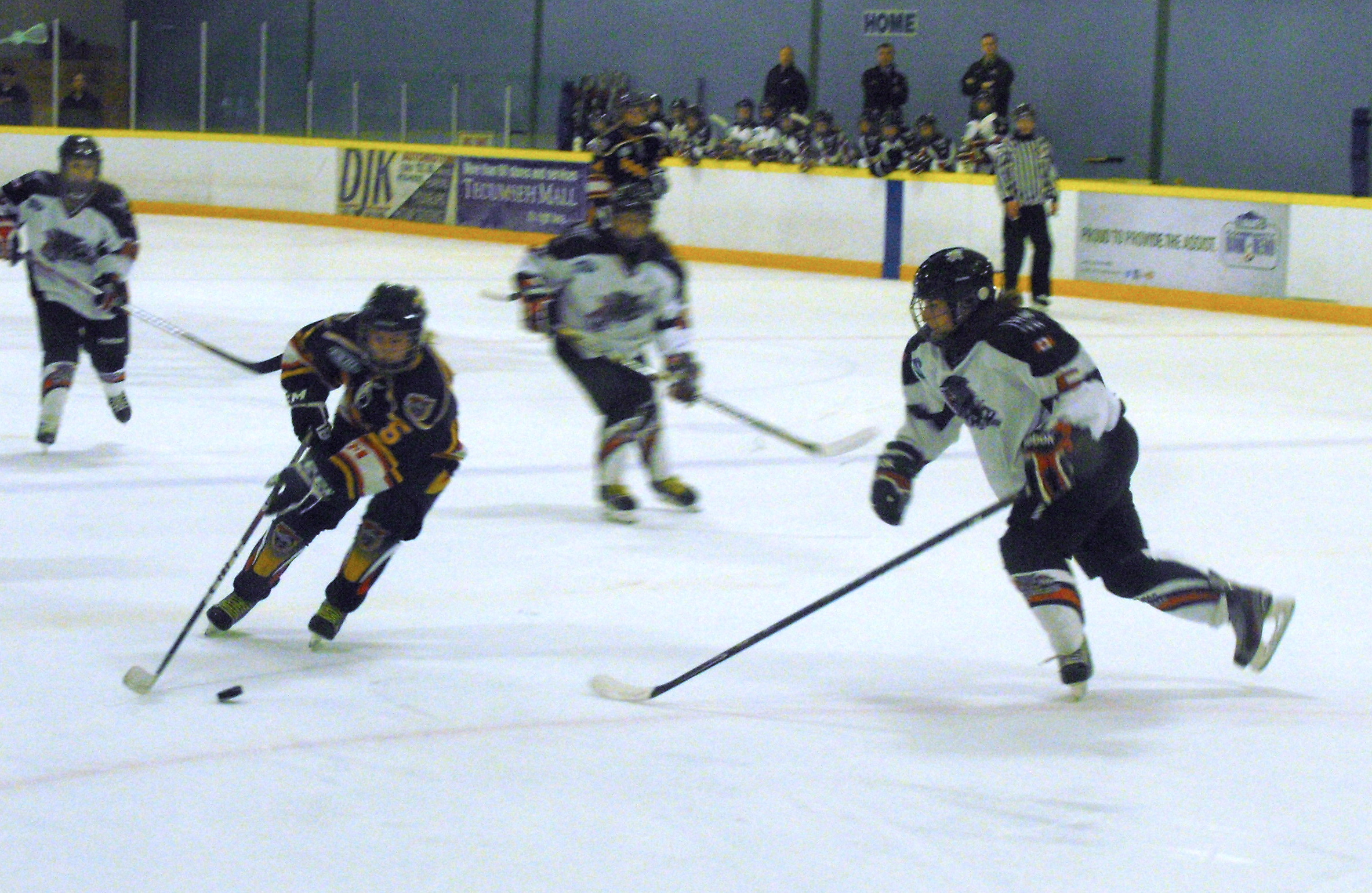
Southwest and Barrie battle during 2013–14 season.

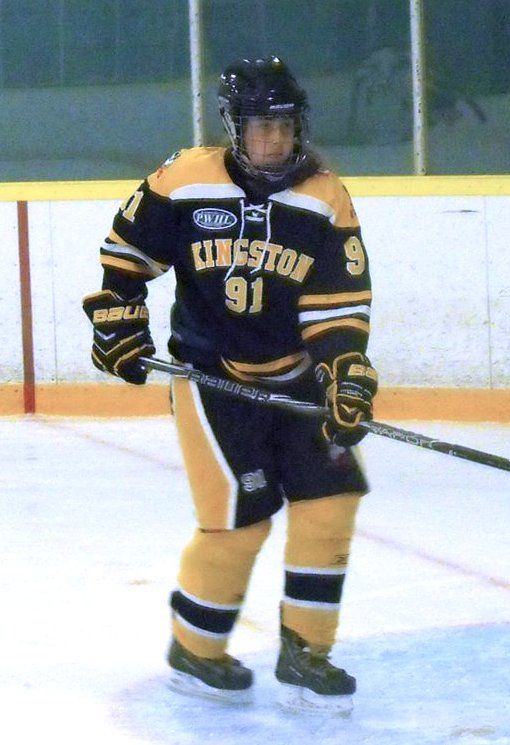
Kingston skater during 2013–14 season.

The league was founded in 2004 as the Provincial Women's Hockey League by the Ontario Women's Hockey Association (OWHA). It is the women's equivalent to men's junior hockey, but is officially classified by the OWHA as "Intermediate AA," as the OWHA does not have an official "junior" classification system. Despite this, its teams market themselves as women's junior hockey.

In the early years of the league, when PWHL teams had to compete for OWHA provincials they would do so with representatives of the Ottawa District. The PWHL franchises proved much more competitive than their Ottawa counterparts and after two seasons Ottawa applied to and joined the PWHL. By the 2009 league playoffs, the Ottawa Senators beat the league powerhouse Toronto Jr. Aeros to win its first league championship.

In the 2019–20 season, the playoffs were cancelled due to the coronavirus pandemic. The following season was not played due to coronavirus-related restrictions.

At some point following the pandemic, the league was renamed to the Ontario Women's Hockey League (OWHL).

== Teams ==
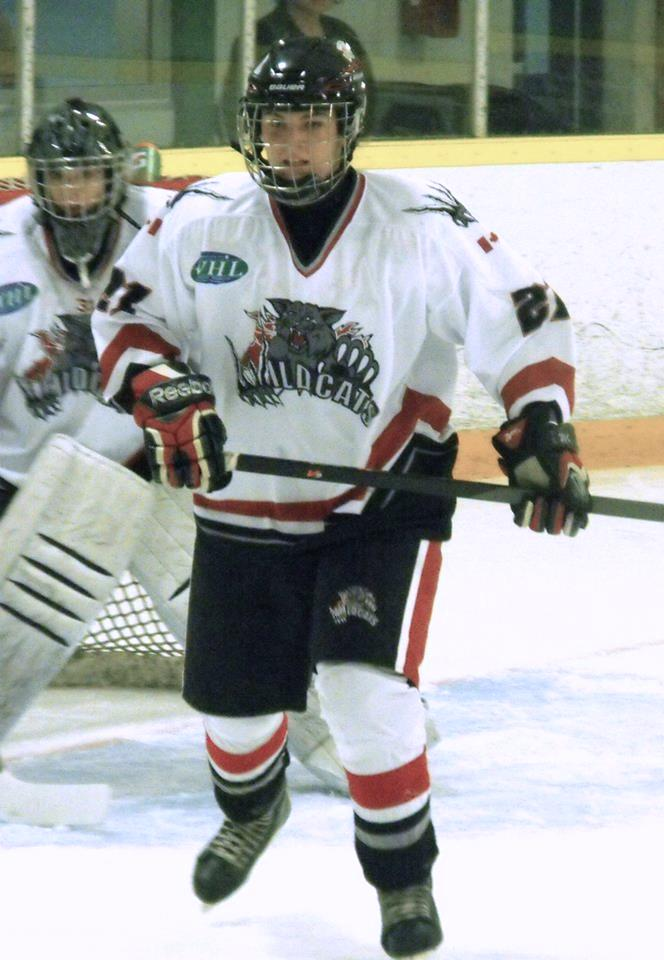
Southwest Jr. Wildcats player during 2014–15 season.

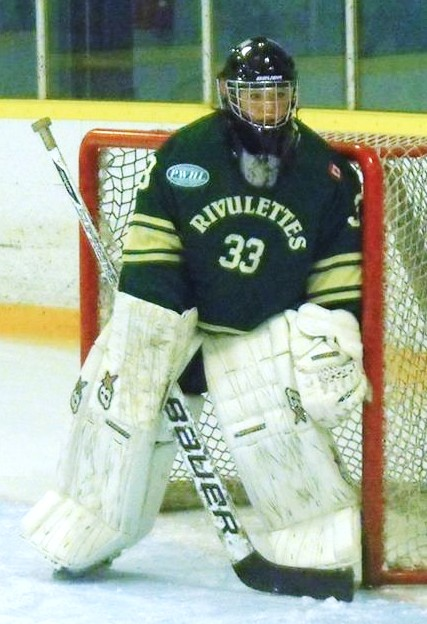
Cambridge Rivulettes goalie during 2013–14 season.

Team	Centre	Joined
Aurora Jr. Panthers	Aurora, Ontario	2004
Barrie Jr. Sharks	Barrie, Ontario	2011
Bluewater Jr. Hawks	Strathroy, Ontario	2004
Brampton Jr. Canadettes	Brampton, Ontario	2004
Burlington Jr. Barracudas	Burlington, Ontario	2004
Cambridge Rivulettes	Cambridge, Ontario	2004
Durham West Jr. Lightning	Ajax, Ontario	2004
Etobicoke Jr. Dolphins	Etobicoke, Toronto	2004
Kingston Ice Wolves	Kingston, Ontario	2012
London Jr. Devilettes	London, Ontario	2004
Mississauga Jr. Hurricanes	Mississauga, Ontario	2004
Nepean Jr. Wildcats	Nepean, Ontario	2010
Oakville Jr. Hornets	Oakville, Ontario	2004
Ottawa Lady Senators	Ottawa, Ontario	2006
Southwest Wildcats	Windsor, Ontario	2004
Stoney Creek Jr. Sabres	Stoney Creek, Ontario	2004
Toronto Jr. Aeros	North York, Toronto	2004
Toronto Leaside Jr. Wildcats	Leaside, Toronto	2012
Waterloo Ravens	Waterloo, Ontario	2008
Whitby Jr. Wolves	Whitby, Ontario	2005

=== Defunct franchises ===
- Chatham Outlaws (2004–2006)
- Hamilton Hawks (2004–2011)
- Markham-Stouffville Stars (2004–2009)

== Champions ==
=== Championships by year ===
Year	Regular season	League Championship	Provincial Championship
Provincial Women's Hockey League
2005	Toronto Jr. Aeros	Toronto Jr. Aeros	Toronto Jr. Aeros
2006	Toronto Jr. Aeros	Toronto Jr. Aeros	Toronto Jr. Aeros
2007	Toronto Jr. Aeros	Toronto Jr. Aeros	Stoney Creek Jr. Sabres
2008	Stoney Creek Jr. Sabres	Stoney Creek Jr. Sabres	Ottawa NCCP Jr. Capitals
2009	Toronto Jr. Aeros	Ottawa Lady Senators	Mississauga Jr. Chiefs
2010	Mississauga Jr. Chiefs	Toronto Jr. Aeros	Toronto Jr. Aeros
2011	Mississauga Jr. Chiefs	Toronto Jr. Aeros	Mississauga Jr. Chiefs
2012	Toronto Jr. Aeros	Bluewater Jr. Hawks	Bluewater Jr. Hawks
2013	Whitby Jr. Wolves	Whitby Jr. Wolves	Durham West Jr. Lightning
2014	Nepean Jr. Wildcats	Whitby Jr. Wolves	Mississauga Jr. Chiefs
2015	Oakville Jr. Hornets	Stoney Creek Jr. Sabres	Oakville Jr. Hornets
2016	Durham West Jr. Lightning	Toronto Jr. Aeros	Toronto Jr. Aeros
2017	Oakville Jr. Hornets	Oakville Jr. Hornets	Oakville Jr. Hornets
2018	Toronto Jr. Aeros	Toronto Jr. Aeros	Toronto Jr. Aeros
2019	Kingston Ice Wolves	London Jr. Devilettes	London Jr. Devilettes
2020	Etobicoke Jr. Dolphins	No tournament held	
2021	Season not played		
Ontario Women's Hockey League U22 Elite
2022	Durham West Jr. Lightning	Durham West Jr. Lightning	Etobicoke Jr. Dolphins
2023	Durham West Jr. Lightning	London Jr. Devilettes	Durham West Jr. Lightning
2024	Etobicoke Jr. Dolphins	Durham West Jr. Lightning	Burlington Barracudas
2025	Etobicoke Jr. Dolphins	Stoney Creek Sabres	Etobicoke Jr. Dolphins

=== Championships by team ===
Team	Regular season	League Championship	Provincial Championship
Bluewater Jr. Hawks		1: 2012	1: 2012
Burlington Barracudas			1: 2024
Durham West Jr. Lightning	3: 2016, 2022, 2023	2: 2022, 2024	2: 2013, 2023
Etobicoke Jr. Dolphins	3: 2020, 2024, 2025		2: 2022, 2025
Kingston Jr. Ice Wolves	1: 2019		
London Jr. Devilettes		2: 2019, 2023	1: 2019
Mississauga Jr. Chiefs/Hurricanes	2: 2010, 2011		3: 2009, 2011, 2014
Nepean Jr. Wildcats	1: 2014		
Oakville Jr. Hornets	2: 2015, 2017	1: 2017	2: 2015, 2017
Ottawa Lady Senators		1: 2009	1: 2008
Stoney Creek Jr. Sabres	1: 2008	3: 2008, 2015, 2025	1: 2007
Toronto Jr. Aeros	6: 2005, 2006, 2007, 2009, 2012, 2018	7: 2005, 2006, 2007, 2010, 2011, 2016, 2018	5: 2005, 2006, 2010, 2016, 2018
Whitby Jr. Wolves	1: 2013	2: 2013, 2014	

=== "Triple Crown" winners ===
Two teams have won the regular season, league championship, and provincial championship in the same season. The first to do it was the Toronto Jr. Aeros, accomplishing the feat back-to-back in the league's first two seasons.

- 2005 Toronto Jr. Aeros
- 2006 Toronto Jr. Aeros
- 2017 Oakville Jr. Hornets
- 2018 Toronto Jr. Aeros

== Awards ==
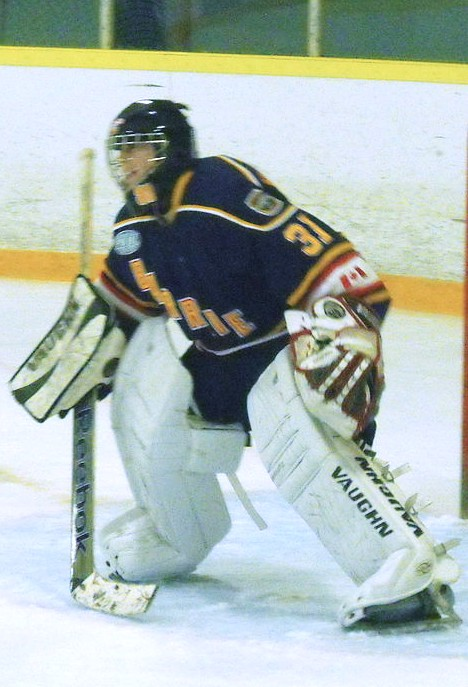
Barrie Jr. Sharks goalie 2013–14 season.

=== Regular season champions ===
Season	Team	Record	Points
2004–05	Toronto Jr. Aeros	23–5–2	48
2005–06	Toronto Jr. Aeros	27–0–3	57
2006–07	Toronto Jr. Aeros	22–6–4	48
2007–08	Stoney Creek Jr. Sabres	27–2–3	57
2008–09	Toronto Jr. Aeros	27–5–2	56
2009–10	Mississauga Chiefs	29–2–3–0	61
2010–11	Mississauga Chiefs	33–3–0–0	66
2011–12	Toronto Jr. Aeros	31–1–1–1	64
2012–13	Whitby Jr. Wolves	29–6–2–1	61
2013–14	Nepean Jr. Wildcats	32–3–2–1	67
2014–15	Oakville Jr. Hornets	31–3–4–0	66
2015–16	Durham West Jr. Lightning	27–2–5–4	63
2016–17	Oakville Jr. Hornets	31–3–4–0	66
2017–18	Toronto Jr. Aeros	31–3–4–0	66
2018–19	Kingston Ice Wolves	28–2–7–1	64
2019–20	Etobicoke Jr. Dolphins	27–4–6	61
2020–21
2021–22	Durham West Jr. Lightning	28–0–1–1	58
2022–23	Durham West Jr. Lightning	36-4-3	111
2023–24	Etobicoke Jr. Dolphins	40-1-2	122
2024-25	Etobicoke Jr. Dolphins	40-5-0	122

=== Scoring champion ===
Season	Player	Team	G-A-P
2004–05			
2005–06	Mallory Deluce	Bluewater Jr. Hawks	18-45–63
2006–07	Laura McIntosh	Mississauga Jr. Chiefs	21-33–54
2007–08	Kelly Sabatine	Stoney Creek Jr. Sabres	28-32–60
2008–09	Kelly Sabatine	Stoney Creek Jr. Sabres	33-35–68
2009–10	Theadora Imbrogno	Mississauga Jr. Chiefs	28-34–62
2010–11	Jenna Dingeldein	Mississauga Jr. Chiefs	21-40–61
2011–12	Emily Janiga	Burlington Jr. Barracudas	27-21–48
2012–13	Krista Yip-Chuck	Whitby Jr. Wolves	29-36–65
2013–14	Victoria Bach	Mississauga Jr. Chiefs	36-32–68
2014–15	Jessie Eldridge	Toronto Jr. Aeros	29-35–64
2015–16	Daryl Watts	Mississauga Jr. Chiefs	30-35–65
2016–17	Emma Maltais	Oakville Hornets	22-34–56
2017–18	Maggie McKee	London Devilettes	14-32–46
2018–19	Maggie McKee	London Devilettes	15-41–56
2019–20	Kiara Zanon	Kingston Ice Wolves	33-31–64
2021-22	Madison Chantler	London Devilettes	19-19-38
2022-23	Kahlen Lamarche	Mississauga Hurricanes	46-36-82
2023-24	Claire Murdoch	Burlington Barracudas	51-73-124
2024-25	Maxine Cimoroni	Mississauga Hurricanes	41-45-86

=== Goaltending Award ===
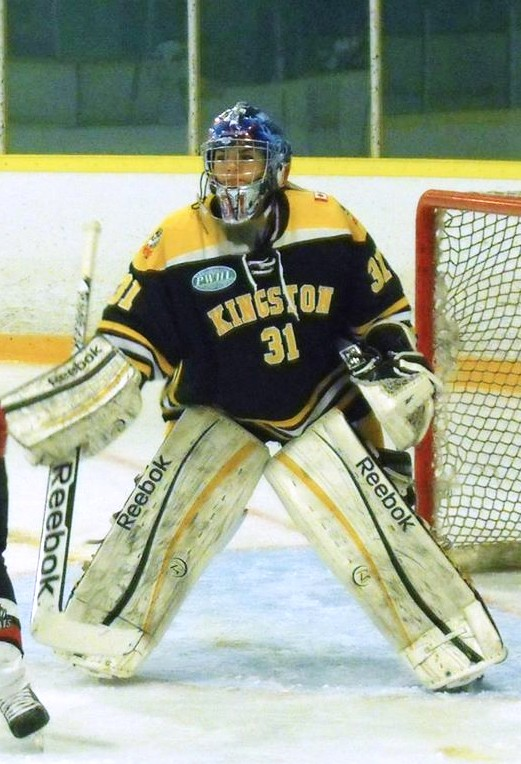
Kingston goalie during 2013–14 season.

Season	Player	Team	GAA
2004–05	Melissa John/ Jamie Miller	Toronto Jr. Aeros	1.50
2005–06	Christina Kessler/ Jamie Miller	Toronto Jr. Aeros	0.93
2006–07	Jamie Miller	Toronto Jr. Aeros	1.28
2007–08	Cassandra McNichol	Mississauga Jr. Chiefs	1.13
2008–09	Cassie Seguin	Ottawa Senators	1.34
2009–10	Olivia Ross	Mississauga Jr. Chiefs	0.98
2010–11	Ali Binnington/ Bridget Smith	Mississauga Jr. Chiefs	1.00
2011–12	Taylor Hough	Toronto Jr. Aeros	0.71
2012–13	Jackie Rochefort	Durham West Jr. Lightning	0.94
2013–14	Kira Bombay	Nepean Jr. Wildcats	0.82
2014–15	Sarah McDonnell	Stoney Creek Jr. Sabres	1.03
2015–16	Danika Ranger	Durham West Jr. Lightning	0.83
2016–17	Makenzy Arsenault	Whitby Wolves	.84
2017–18	Natalie Thompson	Toronto Aeros	.71
2018–19	Andrea Fausto	Stoney Creek Sabres	1.04
2019–20	Michelle Pasiechnyk	Nepean Wildcats	1.33

=== Coach of the Year ===
Season	Coach	Team
2004–05	Paul Rockett	Brampton Jr. Canadettes
2005–06		
2006–07		
2007–08		
2008–09		
2009–10	Dave Gwyn	Etobicoke Jr. Dolphins
2010–11	Rick Sullivan	Bluewater Jr. Hawks
2011–12	Christina Jolliffe	London Jr. Devilettes
2012–13	Wayne McDonald	Durham West Jr. Lightning
2013–14	Bruce MacDonald	Nepean Jr. Wildcats
2014–15	Jessica Turri	Etobicoke Jr. Dolphins
2015–16	Kim McCullough	Leaside Wildcats
2016–17	Troy Sweet	Kingston Jr Ice Wolves
2017–18	Geoff Haddaway	Cambridge Rivulettes
2018–19	Chad Campbell	Waterloo K-W Rangers
2019–20	Stacey Marnoch	Stoney Creek Sabres

=== Christie Rose Scholarship ===
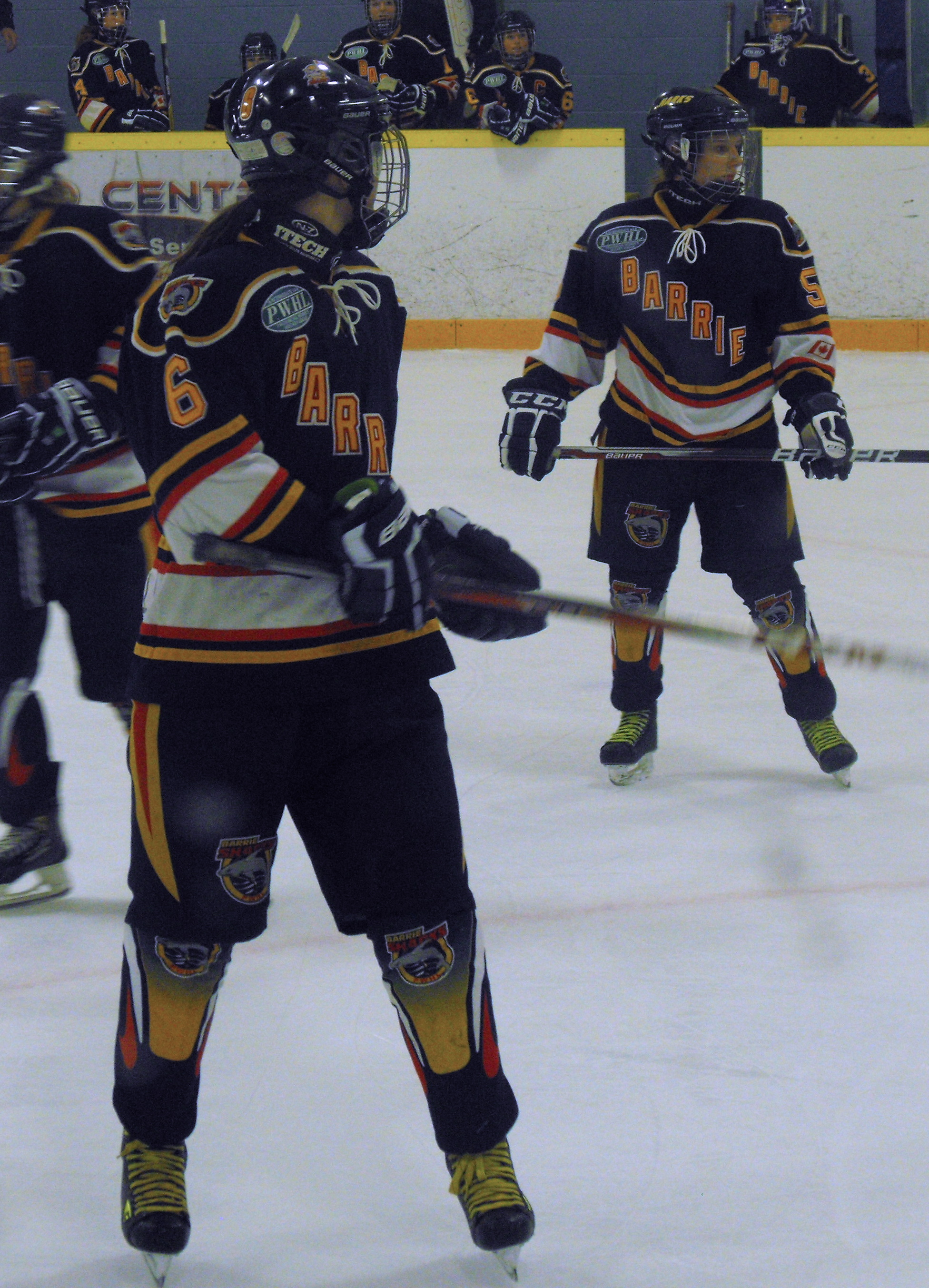
Barrie Jr. Sharks players line up for a draw during 2013–14 season.

For ten years, the PWHL awarded a scholarship in memory of former PWHL player Christie Rose. She was an 18-year-old young woman who died on June 24, 2008, as a result of her injuries suffered in a car accident. The scholarship is awarded on an annual basis to recognize a young woman who shares the same qualities and characteristics as Christie. The scholarship program was ended after it awarded its tenth recipient.

==== Recipients ====
Year	Player	Team
2009	Kaitlyn Bannon	London Jr. Devilettes
2010	Blair Connelly	Bluewater Jr. Hawks
2011	Stacey Scott	London Jr. Devilettes
2012	Michelle Tanel	Durham West Jr. Lightning
2013	Clare McKellar	London Jr. Devilettes
2014	Caitlin Lee/ Erran Lee	Kingston Ice Wolves
2015	Davis Smith	Bluewater Jr. Hawks
2016	Emma Forcey	Bluewater Jr. Hawks
2017	Tayler Murphy	Mississauga Chiefs
2018	Maggie McKee	London Devilettes
