= List of Toronto Sceptres draft picks =

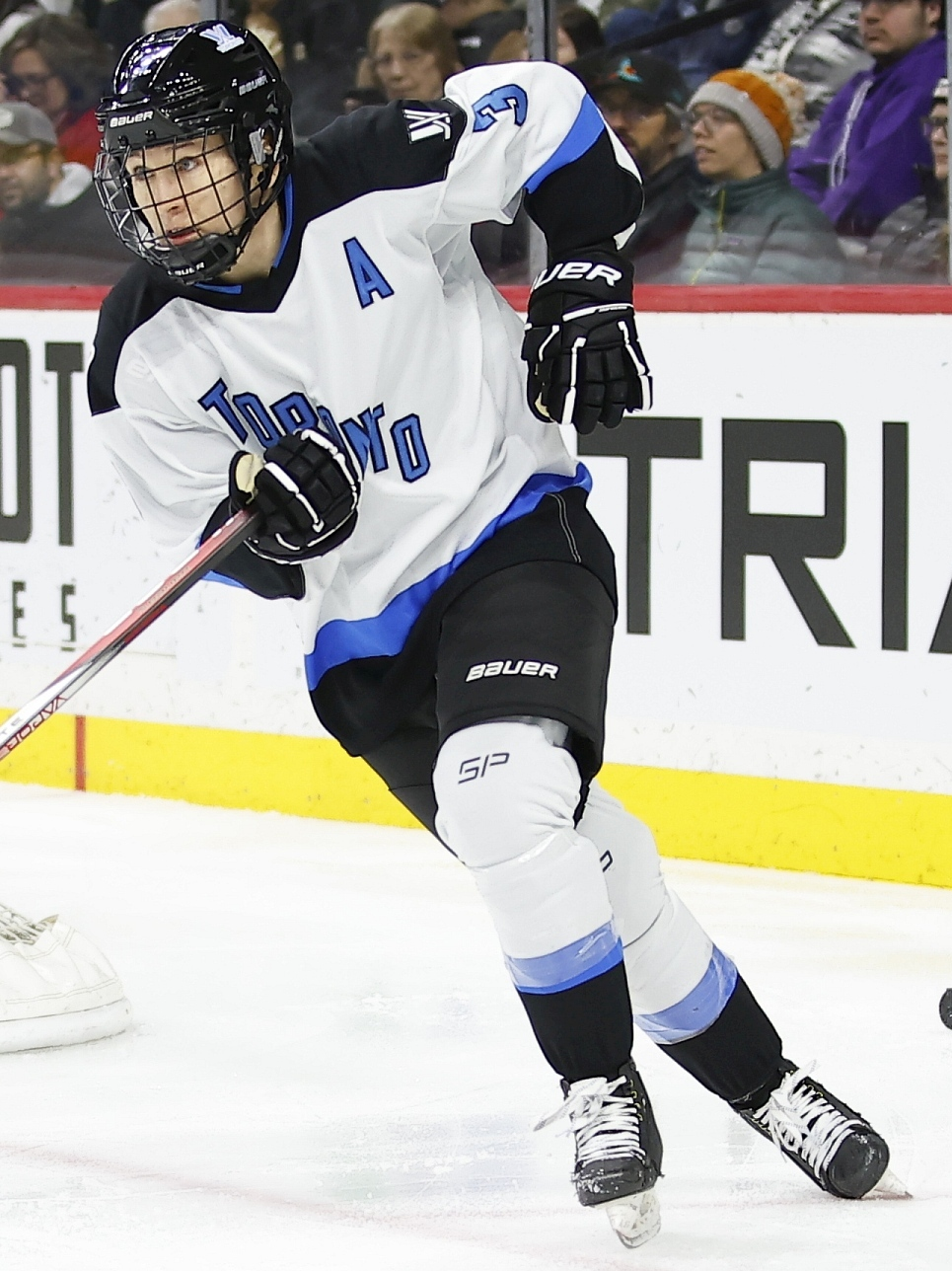
Jocelyne Larocque was the first ever draft selection for Toronto, taken second overall in 2023.

The Toronto Sceptres are a professional ice hockey team in the Professional Women's Hockey League (PWHL). Their first draft pick was Jocelyne Larocque, selected second overall in the 2023 PWHL draft. The Sceptres have participated in four PWHL Drafts and have drafted 33 players.

== Key ==
General terms and abbreviations
Term or abbreviation	Definition
Draft	The year that the player was selected
Round	The round of the draft in which the player was selected
Pick	The overall position in the draft at which the player was selected
Pos	Position of the player

Position abbreviations
Abbreviation	Definition
G	Goaltender
D	Defence
LW	Left wing
C	Centre
RW	Right wing
F	Forward

== Draft picks ==
Full list of Toronto Sceptres draft picks
Draft	Round	Pick	Player	Nationality	Pos	School/club team	Conference/league
2023	1	2	Jocelyne Larocque	Canada	D	Team Adidas	PWHPA
2023	2	11	Emma Maltais	Canada	F	Ohio State University	WCHA
2023	3	14	Kristen Campbell	Canada	G	Team Scotiabank	PWHPA
2023	4	23	Natalie Spooner	Canada	F	Team Scotiabank	PWHPA
2023	5	26	Jesse Compher	United States	F	University of Wisconsin	WCHA
2023	6	35	Kali Flanagan	United States	D	Boston Pride	PHF
2023	7	38	Victoria Bach	Canada	F	Team Scotiabank	PWHPA
2023	8	47	Brittany Howard	Canada	F	Toronto Six	PHF
2023	9	50	Allie Munroe	Canada	D	Connecticut Whale	PHF
2023	10	59	Mellissa Channell	Canada	D	Team Harvey's	PWHPA
2023	11	62	Maggie Connors	Canada	F	Princeton University	ECAC
2023	12	71	Rebecca Leslie	Canada	F	Team Sonnet	PWHPA
2023	13	74	Hannah Miller	Canada	F	Shenzhen KRS	ZhHL
2023	14	83	Alexa Vasko	Canada	F	Team Sonnet	PWHPA
2023	15	86	Olivia Knowles	Canada	D	Minnesota Whitecaps	PHF
2024	1	6	Julia Gosling	Canada	C	St. Lawrence University	ECAC
2024	2	12	Megan Carter	Canada	D	Northeastern University	Hockey East
2024	3	18	Izzy Daniel	United States	F	Cornell University	ECAC
2024	4	24	Lauren Bernard	United States	D	Ohio State University	WCHA
2024	5	30	Noemi Nuebauerová	Czech Republic	F	Brynäs IF	SDHL
2024	6	36	Anneke Linser	United States	F	Djurgårdens IF	SDHL
2024	7	42	Raygan Kirk	Canada	G	Ohio State University	WCHA
2025	2	11	Emma Gentry	United States	F	St. Cloud State University	WCHA
2025	2	16	Kiara Zanon	United States	F	Ohio State University	WCHA
2025	3	23	Clara Van Wieren	United States	F	University of Minnesota Duluth	WCHA
2025	5	35	Sara Hjalmarsson	Sweden	F	Linköping HC	SDHL
2025	6	43	Hanna Baskin	United States	D	University of Minnesota Duluth	WCHA
2026	1	8	Kirsten Simms	United States	F	University of Wisconsin	WCHA
2026	2	20	Jamie Nelson	United States	F	University of Minnesota	WCHA
2026	3	32	Brooke Disher	Canada	D	Ohio State University	WCHA
2026	4	44	Jane Kuehl	United States	F	Princeton University	ECAC
2026	5	56	Emerson O'Leary	United States	F	Princeton University	ECAC
2026	6	68	Alyssa Regalado	Canada	D	Cornell University	ECAC
