= Lenka Serdar =

Czech-American ice hockey player

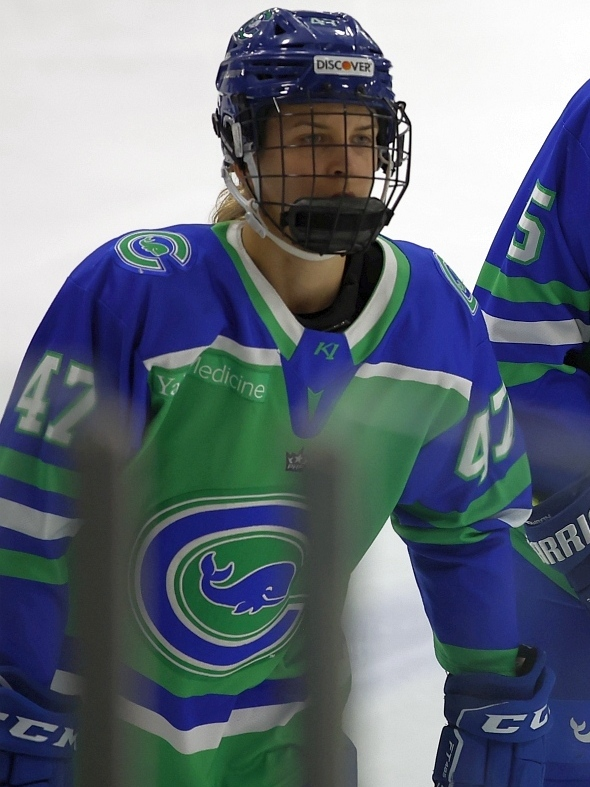
- Serdar with the Connecticut Whale in 2023
- Born: 21 July 1997 (age 29) Lexington, Massachusetts, US
- Height: 172 cm (5 ft 8 in)
- Weight: 63 kg (139 lb; 9 st 13 lb)
- Position: Forward
- Shoots: Left
- PHF team Former teams: Connecticut Whale: Linköping HC; TPS Turku; HC Příbram; ECDC Memmingen; Cornell Big Red
- National team: Czech Republic
- Playing career: 2015–present

Lenka Slezak Serdar (born 21 July 1997) is a Czech-American ice hockey player and member of the Czech national team. She was signed with the Connecticut Whale of the now defunct Premier Hockey Federation (PHF) for the 2022–23 season.

Serdar represented the Czech Republic at the 2021 IIHF Women's World Championship and in the women's ice hockey tournament at the 2022 Winter Olympics in Beijing.

== Playing career ==
Serdar grew up playing ice hockey in and around her home town of Lexington, Massachusetts in the Greater Boston area. During the 2013–14 season, she began playing in the Junior Women's Hockey League (JWHL) with the North American Hockey Academy (NAHA) major junior team, called NAHA White, based in Wellesley, Massachusetts. In her senior year of high school, she relocated to the North American Hockey Academy academic campus in Stowe, Vermont and served as alternate captain to NAHA White. She led the team in scoring during the 2014–15 season, with 11 goals and 27 points in 28 games, and was selected to participate in the JWHL All Star game.

=== NCAA ===
Her college ice hockey career was played with the Cornell Big Red women's ice hockey program in the ECAC Hockey and Ivy League conferences of the NCAA Division I. As a rookie in the 2015–16 season, Serdar notched 1 goal and 7 points in 31 games, ranking fourth of all Big Red freshman in points. The following season, 2016–17, she earned a reputation as a reliable two-way forward, ranking eighth on the team for points, with 13 (3+10), second of all team forwards for blocked shots, with 33, and accumulating the second-highest face-off win percentage, at .535. She earned praise from Cornell head coach Doug Derraugh for her versatility, focus, and skill set. Continuing to develop her offensive game, she recorded 5 goals and 18 points in 33 games in her junior season, 2017–18, and was a 2018 All-Ivy Honorable Mention. Her senior campaign, 2018–19, was her most offensively successful and saw her rank third on the team for goals, with 12, and fifth on the team for points, with 25 in 36 games. During her time at Cornell, Serdar played alongside many future stars of international and professional women’s ice hockey, including Jaime Bourbonnais, Amy Curlew, Sarah Knee, Taylor Woods, and Micah Zandee-Hart.

=== Europe ===
To continue playing ice hockey after college, Serdar relocated to Europe in 2019. She signed with ECDC Memmingen of the German Women's Ice Hockey Bundesliga (DFEL) for the 2019–20 season and led the team in scoring with 26 goals and 49 points in 21 regular season games. In the 2019–20 regular season of the EWHL Supercup, she led all ECDC Memmingen players with six goals and 10 points in 8 games; however, the team withdrew from the Final 4 Tournament and did not contend for the Supercup, being replaced by the fifth-ranked EHV Sabres.

Serdar signed with HC Příbram of the Czech Women’s Hockey Extraliga for the 2020–21 season. The season was significantly delayed due to the COVID-19 pandemic; ultimately, HC Příbram could play only four regular season games. Serdar was explosive in the limited season, leading the league in goals (9), assists (9), and points (18).

When the Extraliga playoffs were cancelled, she sought other opportunities to play and opted to sign with TPS Naiset of the Finnish Naisten Liiga through the end of the 2020–21 season and playoffs. Despite playing in five regular season games, she ranked 20th in the league for scoring, notching three goals and 6 points. In the playoff quarterfinals, sixth-seed TPS faced third-seed HIFK Naiset in a best-of-three series. TPS tallied only two goals in the series, and Serdar played a part in both, assisting on captain Elina Heikkinen’s goal and potting an empty net goal of her own in the second game.

Ahead of the 2021–22 season, Serdar signed a two-season contract with Linköping HC of the Swedish Women's Hockey League (SDHL). In a press release announcing the signing, she noted that she was motivated to play in Sweden because she "heard that the SDHL is the best league in Europe… It’s an Olympic year, so it’s an important year and an important season. So I wan’t to play the best hockey possible."

== International play ==
As a junior player, Serdar was invited to and attended several under-18 development camps hosted by USA Hockey.

She first played with the Czech national team after moving to Germany in 2019, appearing in international friendlies during the 2019–20 and 2020–21 seasons. Her major tournament debut was the 2021 IIHF Women's World Championship, and she has stated her desire to qualify for and play in the Olympic Games with the Czech national team.

== Personal life ==
Serdar is a dual citizen of the Czech Republic and the United States. Both her mother, Alena Slezak and her father, Luka Serdar, were born in the Czech Republic (then part of Czechoslovakia). Though she was raised in the United States, she has described her upbringing as very Czech, “All four [of my] grandparents were Czech. Even in America, we followed Czech customs, ate Czech food, and spoke Czech.” She has two older siblings, Luka and Petra.

She attended Lexington High School during her first three years of secondary school, where she was a three-year honor roll member and a ten-time letter winner across three sports, ice hockey, lacrosse, and soccer.

== Career statistics ==
=== Regular season and playoffs ===
			Regular season					Playoffs
Season	Team	League	GP	G	A	Pts	PIM	GP	G	A	Pts	PIM
2013–14	NAHA White	JWHL	30	10	11	21	8	–	–	–	–	–
2014–15	NAHA White	JWHL	28	11	16	27	27	–	–	–	–	–
2015–16	Cornell Big Red	NCAA	31	1	6	7	12	–	–	–	–	–
2016–17	Cornell Big Red	NCAA	34	3	10	13	26	–	–	–	–	–
2017–18	Cornell Big Red	NCAA	33	5	13	18	14	–	–	–	–	–
2018–19	Cornell Big Red	NCAA	36	12	13	25	18	–	–	–	–	–
2019–20	ECDC Memmingen	DFEL	21	26	23	49	28	3	1	4	5	4
2020–21	HC Příbram	Extraliga žen	4	9	9	18	4	–	–	–	–	–
2020–21	TPS	Naisten Liiga	5	3	3	6	2	2	1	1	2	2
2021–22	Linköping HC	SDHL	35	11	18	29	26	7	1	3	4	12
NCAA totals			134	21	42	63	70	–	–	–	–	–

Sources: Elite Prospects, JWHL, USCHO

=== International ===
Year	Team	Event	Result	GP	G	A	Pts	PIM
2021	Czech Republic	WW	7th	5	0	0	0	2
2022	Czech Republic	OG	7th	5	0	0	0	4
Totals				10	0	0	0	6

Source: IIHF
