= 2018–19 Minnesota Golden Gophers women's ice hockey season =

College ice hockey team season

2019 NCAA tournament, Won First Round vs. Princeton (5–2) Won Frozen Four vs. Cornell (2–0) Lost Championship vs. Wisconsin (0–2)
- Conference: WCHA
- Home ice: Ridder Arena

Rankings
- USCHO.com: 2

Record
- Overall: 32–6–1
- Home: 17–4–0
- Road: 13–1–1
- Neutral: 2–1

Coaches and captains
- Head coach: Brad Frost
- Assistant coaches: Joel Johnson; Bethany Brausen
- Captain: Kelly Pannek

The 2018–19 Minnesota Golden Gophers women's ice hockey season represented the University of Minnesota during the 2018–19 NCAA Division I women's ice hockey season. They were coached by Brad Frost in his 12th season. The Golden Gophers lost to Wisconsin 2–0 during the NCAA championship game.

== Recruiting ==
Player	Position	Nationality	Notes
Catie Skaja	Forward	United States	Played for New Prague High School
Gracie Ostertag	Defense	United States	Played for Shattuck-Saint Mary's
Taylor Heise	Forward	United States	Played for Red Wing High School
Crystalyn Hengler	Defense	United States	Played for Eden Prairie High School
Emily Oden	Forward	United States	Played for Edina High School
Abigail Boreen	Forward	United States	Played for Hill-Murray School

== Regular season ==
=== Standings ===
2018–19 Western Collegiate Hockey Association standings
	Conference								Overall					
	GP	W	L	T	SW	PTS	GF	GA	GP	W	L	T	GF	GA
#2 Minnesota†	24	19	4	1	0	58	95	48	39	32	6	1	160	69
#1 Wisconsin*	24	18	4	2	0	56	78	26	41	35	4	2	155	43
#9 Ohio State	24	12	10	2	2	40	57	58	35	20	13	2	95	82
Minnesota Duluth	35	24	9	11	4	35	63	69	35	15	16	4	92	99
Bemidji State	24	10	12	2	0	32	49	67	36	13	21	2	75	103
Minnesota State	24	3	16	5	2	16	41	71	35	9	19	7	64	91
St. Cloud State	24	5	19	0	0	15	38	82	37	10	25	2	66	119
Championship: March 10, 2019 † indicates conference regular season champion; * indicates conference tournament champion Rankings: USCHO.com

=== Schedule ===
Date	Time	Opponent^{#}	Rank^{#}	Site	Decision	Result	Attendance	Record
Regular Season
September 28	7:07	#10 Mercyhurst*	#3	Ridder Arena • Minneapolis, MN	Gulstene	W 4–2	1,227	1–0–0
September 29	4:07	#10 Mercyhurst*	#3	Ridder Arena • Minneapolis, MN	Scobee	W 5–0	1,069	2–0–0
October 5	7:07	at #4 Minnesota Duluth	#3	AMSOIL Arena • Duluth, MN	Gulstene	W 5–2	1,251	3–0–0 (1–0–0)
October 6	3:07	at #4 Minnesota Duluth	#3	AMSOIL Arena • Duluth, MN	Gulstene	T 2–2	1,149	3–0–1 (1–0–1)
October 12	6:07	at St. Cloud State	#3	Herb Brooks National Hockey Center • St. Cloud, MN	Gulstene	W 5–2	542	4–0–1 (2–0–1)
October 5	4:07	at St. Cloud State	#3	Ridder Arena • Minneapolis, MN	Scobee	W 4–1	1,463	5–0–1 (3–0–1)
October 19	7:07	#4 Ohio State	#3	Ridder Arena • Minneapolis, MN	Gulstene	W 3–0	1,623	6–0–1 (4–0–1)
October 20	3:07	#4 Ohio State	#3	Ridder Arena • Minneapolis, MN	Scobee	L 2–3	1,619	6–1–1 (4–1–1)
October 27	2:07	at #1 Wisconsin	#3	LaBahn Arena • Madison, WI	Gulstene	W 1–0	2,273	7–1–1 (5–1–1)
October 28	7:07	at #1 Wisconsin	#3	LaBahn Arena • Madison, WI	Scobee	L 1–4	2,273	7–2–1 (5–2–1)
November 2	6:07	Bemidji State	#2	Ridder Arena • Minneapolis, MN	Gulstene	W 6–3	1,373	8–2–1 (6–2–1)
November 3	4:07	Bemidji State	#2	Ridder Arena • Minneapolis, MN	Gulstene	W 2–1	2,097	9–2–1 (7–2–1)
November 17	2:07	at St. Cloud State	#2	Herb Brooks National Hockey Center • St. Cloud, MN	Gulstene	W 4–3 ^{OT}	463	10–2–1 (8–2–1)
November 18	2:07	St. Cloud State	#2	Ridder Arena • Minneapolis, MN	Gulstene	W 7–2	1,660	11–2–1 (9–2–1)
November 23	3:00	vs. #8 St. Lawrence*	#2	Gutterson Fieldhouse • Burlington, VT (Windjammer Classic)	Gulstene	W 8–2	485	12–2–1 (9–2–1)
November 24	6:00	at Vermont*	#2	Gutterson Fieldhouse • Burlington, VT (Windjammer Classic)	Gulstene	W 6–2	313	13–2–1 (9–2–1)
November 30	5:00	at Yale*	#2	Ingalls Rink • New Haven, CT	Scobee	W 7–1	429	14–2–1 (9–2–1)
December 1	2:00	at Yale*	#2	Ingalls Rink • New Haven, CT	Gulstene	W 3–1	210	15–2–1 (9–2–1)
December 7	7:07	Robert Morris*	#2	Ridder Arena • Minneapolis, MN	Gulstene	W 6–1	1,524	16–2–1 (9–2–1)
December 8	1:07	Robert Morris*	#2	Ridder Arena • Minneapolis, MN	Scobee	W 5–0	1,533	17–2–1 (9–2–1)
January 5	4:07	Minnesota Duluth*	#2	Ridder Arena • Minneapolis, MN (Minnesota Cup)	Gulstene	W 4–3 ^{OT}	2,256	18–2–1 (9–2–1)
January 6	4:07	St. Cloud State*	#2	Ridder Arena • Minneapolis, MN (Minnesota Cup)	Scobee	W 5–1	1,489	19–2–1 (9–2–1)
January 11	7:07	at Minnesota State	#2	Verizon Center • Mankato, MN	Gulstene	W 5–1	253	20–2–1 (10–2–1)
January 12	3:07	at Minnesota State	#2	Verizon Center • Mankato, MN	Scobee	W 6–3	318	21–2–1 (11–2–1)
January 18	7:07	#1 Wisconsin	#2	Ridder Arena • Minneapolis, MN	Gulstene	L 1–2	3,196	21–3–1 (11–3–1)
January 19	4:07	#1 Wisconsin	#2	Ridder Arena • Minneapolis, MN	Scobee	W 3–1	3,400	22–3–1 (12–3–1)
January 25	5:07	at #7 Ohio State	#2	The Ohio State University Ice Rink • Columbus, OH	Gulstene	W 7–2	534	23–3–1 (13–3–1)
January 26	2:07	at #7 Ohio State	#2	The Ohio State University Ice Rink • Columbus, OH	Scobee	W 7–1	916	24–3–1 (14–3–1)
February 2	4:07	Minnesota Duluth	#2	Ridder Arena • Minneapolis, MN	Gulstene	L 2–3 ^{OT}	3,008	24–4–1 (14–4–1)
February 3	1:07	Minnesota Duluth	#2	Ridder Arena • Minneapolis, MN	Scobee	W 5–3	2,341	25–4–1 (15–4–1)
February 15	7:07	Minnesota State	#1	Ridder Arena • Minneapolis, MN	Gulstene	W 3–1	1,930	26–4–1 (16–4–1)
February 16	1:07	Minnesota State	#1	Ridder Arena • Minneapolis, MN	Scobee	W 3–2 ^{OT}	2,324	27–4–1 (17–4–1)
February 22	3:07	at Bemidji State	#2	Sanford Center • Bemidji, MN	Gulstene	W 6–3	289	28–4–1 (18–4–1)
February 23	3:07	at Bemidji State	#2	Sanford Center • Bemidji, MN	Scobee	W 4–3	361	29–4–1 (19–4–1)
WCHA Tournament
March 9	2:00	#4 Minnesota State*	#1	Ridder Arena • Minneapolis, MN	Gulstene	W 4–1	2,611	30–4–1 (19–4–1)
March 10	2:00	#2 Wisconsin*	#1	Ridder Arena • Minneapolis, MN	Scobee	L 1–3	2,452	30–5–1 (19–4–1)
NCAA Tournament
March 16	4:00	Princeton*	#2	Ridder Arena • Minneapolis, MN	Scobee	W 5–2	2,079	31–5–1 (19–4–1)
March 22	3:00	vs. Cornell*	#2	People's United Center • Hamden, CT (NCAA Frozen Four)	Gulstene	W 2–0	3,241	32–5–1 (19–4–1)
March 24	1:30	vs. #1 Wisconsin*	#2	People's United Center • Hamden, CT (NCAA Frozen Four)	Gulstene	L 0–2	3,423	32–6–1 (19–4–1)
*Non-conference game. ^{#}Rankings from USCHO.com Poll.

=== Roster ===
No.	Nat.	Player	Class	Pos	Height	DoB	Hometown	Previous team
2		Emily Brown	Freshman	D	5' 7" (1.7 m)	1998-12-30	Blaine, Minnesota	Blaine High School
3		Catie Skaja	Freshman	F	5' 7" (1.7 m)	1999-07-28	New Prague, Minnesota	New Prague High School
4		Tianna Gunderson	Junior	F	5' 6" (1.68 m)	1996-08-27	Roseau, Minnesota	Roseau High School
5		Sophie Skarzynski	Junior	D	5' 8" (1.73 m)	1997-09-18	Lake Forest, Illinois	Loyola Academy
6		Gracie Ostertag	Freshman	D	5' 7" (1.7 m)	2000-02-14	Shakopee, Minnesota	Shattuck-Saint Mary's
7		Taylor Williamson	Junior	F	5' 7" (1.7 m)	1996-08-20	Edina, Minnesota	Edina High School
8		Kippin Keller	Sophomore	F	5' 4" (1.63 m)	1997-12-16	Minnetonka, Minnesota	Minnetonka High School
9		Taylor Heise	Freshman	F	5' 10" (1.78 m)	2000-03-17	Lake City, Minnesota	Red Wing High School
12		Grace Zumwinkle	Freshman	F	5' 8" (1.73 m)	1999-04-23	Excelsior, Minnesota	Breck School
13		Crystalyn Hengler	Freshman	D	5' 8" (1.73 m)	1999-09-11	Eden Prairie, Minnesota	Eden Prairie High School
15		Jackie Pieper	Junior (RS)	F	5' 6" (1.68 m)	1995-10-09	Edina, Minnesota	Merrimack College (Hockey East)
16		Amy Potomak	Freshman	F	5' 9" (1.75 m)	1999-01-25	Aldergrove, British Columbia	George Eliot Secondary
17		Sierra Smith	Junior	F	5' 8" (1.73 m)	1996-09-02	Stillwater, Minnesota	Stillwater Area High School
18		Katie Robinson	Sophomore	D	5' 10" (1.78 m)	1997-10-08	Kasson, Minnesota	Kasson-Mantorville High School
19		Kelly Pannek (C)	Senior	F	5' 8" (1.73 m)	1995-12-29	Plymouth, Minnesota	Benilde-St. Margaret's
20		Alex Woken	Sophomore	F	5' 8" (1.73 m)	1998-02-25	Fargo, North Dakota	Shattuck-Saint Mary's
21		Emily Oden	Freshman	F	5' 8" (1.73 m)	1999-11-14	Edina, Minnesota	Edina High School
22		Abigail Boreen	Freshman	F	5' 8" (1.73 m)	2000-04-03	Somerset, Wisconsin	Hill-Murray School
24		Olivia Knowles	Freshman	D	5' 9" (1.75 m)	1999-01-24	Campbell River, British Columbia	Penticton Secondary School
25		Nicole Schammel	Junior (RS)	F	5' 5" (1.65 m)	1996-04-09	Red Wing, Minnesota	Red Wing High School
26		Sarah Potomak	Junior	F	5' 5" (1.65 m)	1996-04-08	Aldergrove, British Columbia	George Eliot Secondary
27		Patti Marshall	Sophomore	D	5' 7" (1.7 m)	1998-05-11	Thief River Falls, MN	Shattuck-Saint Mary's
28		Taylor Wente	Freshman	F	5' 8" (1.73 m)	1999-04-01	Plymouth, Minnesota	Maple Grove High School
29		Alex Gulstene	Freshman	G	5' 8" (1.73 m)	1999-04-14	Vancouver, British Columbia	Penticton Secondary School
31		Emma May	Junior	G	5' 6" (1.68 m)	1996-10-21	Eagan, Minnesota	Eagan High School
37		Sydney Scobee	Junior	G	6' 0" (1.83 m)	1995-02-26	Minnetrista, Minnesota	Vermont (Hockey East)
