= 2018–19 Clarkson Golden Knights women's ice hockey season =

ECAC Hockey Tournament Champions NCAA Semifinals, L 0–5 vs. Wisconsin
- Conference: T–2nd ECAC
- Home ice: Cheel Arena

Rankings
- USCHO.com: #3
- USA Today/USA Hockey Magazine: #3

Record
- Overall: 30–8–2
- Home: 18–1–1
- Road: 11–5–0
- Neutral: 1–2–1

Coaches and captains
- Head coach: Matt Desrosiers
- Assistant coaches: Britni Smith; Tony Maci
- Captain: Cassidy Vinkle
- Alternate captain(s): Josianne Pozzebon; Ella Shelton

The Clarkson Golden Knights women's ice hockey program represented Clarkson University during the 2018–19 NCAA Division I women's ice hockey season. The Golden Knights entered the season as the defending national champions as well as the ECAC regular season and tournament champions. They also entered the season as the top-ranked team in both the USCHO.com and the USA Today/USA Hockey Magazine polls for the second time.

During the season, the Golden Knights participated in the first NCAA women's ice hockey games outside the United States when they traveled to Belfast for a two-game series with Northeastern.

== Roster ==
No.	Nat.	Player	Class	Pos	Height	DoB	Hometown	Previous team
4		Avery Mitchell	Sophomore	D	5' 4" (1.63 m)	1999-08-30	Pickering, Ontario	Toronto Jr. Aeros
7		Elizabeth Giguere	Sophomore	F	5' 10" (1.78 m)	1997-05-08	Quebec, Quebec	Limoilou Titans
9		Tia Stoddard	Sophomore	F	5' 1" (1.55 m)	1998-06-09	La Mesa, California	Nepean Jr. Wildcats
10		Michaela Pejzlova	Junior	F	5' 7" (1.7 m)	1997-04-06	Pardubice, Czech Republic	Stanstead Spartans
11		Ella Shelton (A)	Junior	D	5' 8" (1.73 m)	1998-01-19	Ingersoll, Ontario	London Devilettes
12		Katherine Beaumier	Junior	F	5' 4" (1.63 m)	1998-02-03	Richland, Washington	Anaheim Lady Ducks
14		Morgan Helgeson	Freshman	F	5' 6" (1.68 m)	1999-05-05	Lake Elmo, Minnesota	Hill-Murray School
16		Michaela Boyle	Sophomore	F	5' 3" (1.6 m)	1999-07-16	Reading, Massachusetts	Reading Memorial High School
17		Taylor Turnquist	Junior	D	5' 5" (1.65 m)	1997-08-14	Blaine, Minnesota	Spring Lake Park H.S.
18		Meaghan Hector	Sophomore	D	5' 6" (1.68 m)	1999-03-24	Georgetown, Ontario	Oakville Jr. Hornets
19		Loren Gabel	Senior	F	5' 4" (1.63 m)	1997-07-24	Kitchener, Ontario	Oakville Jr. Hornets
20		Kristy Pidgeon	Sophomore	F	5' 10" (1.78 m)	1999-12-16	Ingleside, Ontario	Nepean Jr. Wildcats
21		Emma Keenan	Senior	D	5' 7" (1.7 m)	1997-11-26	Calgary, Alberta	Okanagan Hockey Academy
22		Cassidy Vinkle (C)	Senior	F	5' 8" (1.73 m)	1997-08-28	Belleville, Ontario	Whitby Jr. Wolves
23		Miranda Gaudet	Freshman	F	5' 7" (1.7 m)	1999-12-21	West Kelowna, British Columbia	Okanagan Hockey Academy
24		Taylor Sawka	Freshman	F	5' 5" (1.65 m)	1999-02-26	Cochrane, Alberta	Nepean Jr. Wildcats
25		Rhyen McGill (injured)	Senior	F	5' 8" (1.73 m)	1997-10-28	Whitby, Ontario	Whitby Jr. Wolves
26		Kelly Mariani	Senior	F	5' 3" (1.6 m)	1997-03-03	Mississauga, Ontario	Mississauga Jr. Chiefs
27		T.T. Cianfarano	Senior (RS)	F	5' 6" (1.68 m)	1996-07-21	Oswego, New York	Quinnipiac Bobcats
28		Josiane Pozzebon (A)	Senior	D	5' 5" (1.65 m)	1997-03-25	Bourget, Ontario	Nepean Jr. Wildcats
29		Kia Castonguay	Sophomore	G	5' 5" (1.65 m)	1998-10-24	Ipswich, Massachusetts	Boston Shamrocks
32		Kassidy Sauve	Senior (RS)	G	5' 9" (1.75 m)	1996-05-19	Whitby, Ontario	Ohio State Buckeyes
33		Marie-Pier Coulombe	Freshman	G	5' 5" (1.65 m)	1998-04-26	Carignan, Quebec	Limoilou Titans

== Standings ==
2018–19 ECAC Hockey standings
	Conference							Overall					
	GP	W	L	T	PTS	GF	GA	GP	W	L	T	GF	GA
#4 Cornell†	22	17	3	2	36	75	32	36	24	6	6	114	61
#10 Colgate	22	15	4	3	33	83	49	38	23	10	5	133	96
#3 Clarkson*	22	16	5	1	33	81	36	40	30	8	2	143	73
#7 Princeton	22	15	4	3	33	83	40	33	20	8	5	116	68
St. Lawrence	22	9	7	6	24	51	46	36	14	15	7	76	87
Quinnipiac	22	9	9	4	22	52	40	36	12	18	6	73	73
Harvard	22	9	9	4	22	46	41	32	12	15	5	74	68
RPI	22	10	11	1	21	33	57	37	14	18	5	50	88
Yale	22	7	12	3	17	49	61	29	8	18	3	62	87
Dartmouth	22	4	16	2	10	30	66	29	5	21	3	39	88
Brown	22	2	16	4	8	32	88	29	5	20	4	47	109
Union	22	2	19	1	5	27	86	34	4	28	2	43	129
Championship: March 10, 2019 † indicates conference regular season champion; * indicates conference tournament champion Rankings: USCHO.com

== Schedule ==
Date	Opponent^{#}	Rank^{#}	Site	Decision	Result	Record
Regular Season
September 28	at Bemidji State*	#1	Sanford Center • Bemidji, MN	Kassidy Sauve	W 5–1	1–0–0
September 29	at Bemidji State*	#1	Sanford Center • Bemidji, MN	Kassidy Sauve	W 5–3	2–0–0
October 5	Robert Morris*	#1	Cheel Arena • Potsdam, NY	Kassidy Sauve	W 4–2	3–0–0
October 6	Robert Morris*	#1	Cheel Arena • Potsdam, NY	Kassidy Sauve	W 4–3	4–0–0
October 13	Montreal*	#1	Cheel Arena • Potsdam, NY (exhibition)	Marie-Pier Coulombe	W 6–3	4–0–0
October 19	at St. Lawrence*	#1	Appleton Arena • Canton, NY	Kassidy Sauve	L 3–4 ^{OT}	4–1–0
October 20	St. Lawrence*	#1	Cheel Arena • Potsdam, NY	Kassidy Sauve	W 4–0	5–1–0
October 26	at Syracuse*	#2	Tennity Ice Skating Pavilion • Syracuse, NY	Kassidy Sauve	W 6–2	6–1–0
October 27	Syracuse*	#2	Cheel Arena • Potsdam, NY	Kassidy Sauve	W 4–3 ^{OT}	7–1–0
November 2	Union	#3	Cheel Arena • Potsdam, NY	Marie-Pier Coulombe	W 5–1	8–1–0 (1–0–0)
November 3	RPI	#3	Cheel Arena • Potsdam, NY	Kassidy Sauve	W 3–0	9–1–0 (2–0–0)
November 16	at Brown	#3	Meehan Auditorium • Providence, RI	Kia Castonguay	W 9–1	10–1–0 (3–0–0)
November 17	at Yale	#3	Ingalls Rink • New Haven, CT	Marie-Pier Coulombe	L 1–5	10–2–0 (3–1–0)
November 23	Minnesota Duluth*	#3	Cheel Arena • Potsdam, NY	Kassidy Sauve	W 4–1	11–2–0
November 24	Minnesota Duluth*	#3	Cheel Arena • Potsdam, NY	Kassidy Sauve	W 4–2	12–2–0
November 30	at Colgate	#3	Class of 1965 Arena • Hamilton, NY	Kassidy Sauve	L 1–4	12–3–0 (3–2–0)
December 1	at #7 Cornell	#3	Lynah Rink • Ithaca, NY	Kassidy Sauve	L 1–3	12–4–0 (3–3–0)
December 7	at St. Lawrence	#5	Appleton Arena • Canton, NY	Kassidy Sauve	W 4–0	13–4–0 (4–3–0)
December 8	St. Lawrence	#5	Cheel Arena • Potsdam, NY	Kassidy Sauve	W 3–1	14–4–0 (5–3–0)
January 5	vs. #3 Northeastern*	#5	SSE Arena • Belfast, Northern Ireland (Friendship Series Game 1)	Kassidy Sauve	T 3–3 ^{OT}	14–4–1
January 6	vs. #3 Northeastern*	#5	SSE Arena • Belfast, Northern Ireland (Friendship Series Game 2)	Kassidy Sauve	L 1–3	14–5–1
January 11	at RPI	#6	Houston Field House • Troy, NY	Kassidy Sauve	W 5–1	15–5–1 (6–3–0)
January 12	at Union	#6	Achilles Rink • Schenectady, NY	Marie-Pier Coulombe	W 6–0	16–5–1 (7–3–0)
January 18	Yale	#6	Cheel Arena • Potsdam, NY	Kassidy Sauve	W 5–1	17–5–1 (8–3–0)
January 19	Brown	#6	Cheel Arena • Potsdam, NY	Kassidy Sauve	W 6–0	18–5–1 (9–3–0)
January 25	Harvard	#5	Cheel Arena • Potsdam, NY	Kassidy Sauve	W 4–2	19–5–1 (10–3–0)
January 26	Dartmouth	#5	Cheel Arena • Potsdam, NY	Kassidy Sauve	W 4–2	20–5–1 (11–3–0)
February 1	at Qunnipiac	#5	People's United Center • Hamden, CT	Kassidy Sauve	W 3–2	21–5–1 (12–3–0)
February 2	at #4 Princeton	#5	Hobey Baker Memorial Rink • Princeton, NJ	Kassidy Sauve	W 3–1	22–5–1 (13–3–0)
February 8	#6 Cornell	#4	Cheel Arena • Potsdam, NY	Kassidy Suave	W 4–0	23–5–1 (14–3–0)
February 9	#10 Colgate	#4	Cheel Arena • Potsdam, NY	Kassidy Sauve	L 3–4 ^{OT}	23–6–1 (14–4–0)
February 15	at Dartmouth	#4	Thompson Arena • Hanover, NH	Kassidy Sauve	L 2–3 ^{OT}	23–7–1 (14–5–0)
February 16	at Harvard	#4	Bright-Landry Hockey Center • Allston, MA	Kassidy Sauve	W 3–2 ^{OT}	24–7–1 (15–5–0)
February 22	#6 Princeton	#5	Cheel Arena • Potsdam, NY	Kassidy Sauve	W 5–2	25–7–1 (16–5–0)
February 23	Quinnipiac	#5	Cheel Arena • Potsdam, NY	Kassidy Sauve	T 1–1 ^{OT}	25–7–2 (16–5–1)
ECAC Hockey Tournament
March 1	Quinnipiac*	#5	Cheel Arena • Potsdam, NY (Quarterfinals Game 1)	Kassidy Sauve	W 3–0	26–7–2
March 2	Quinnipiac*	#5	Cheel Arena • Potsdam, NY (Quarterfinals Game 2)	Kassidy Sauve	W 4–3 ^{OT}	27–7–2
March 9	vs. #10 Colgate*	#4	Lynah Rink • Ithaca, NY (Semifinals)	Kassidy Sauve	W 2–0	28–7–2
March 10	at #5 Cornell*	#4	Lynah Rink • Ithaca, NY (Championship)	Kassidy Sauve	W 4–1	29–7–2
NCAA Tournament
March 16	#5 Boston College*	#4	Cheel Arena • Potsdam, NY (Quarterfinals)	Kassidy Sauve	W 2–1 ^{OT}	30–7–2
March 22	vs. #1 Wisconsin*	#4	People's United Center • Hamden, CT (Semifinals)	Kassidy Sauve	L 0–5	30–8–2
*Non-conference game. ^{#}Rankings from USCHO.com Poll.

== Awards and honors ==
- Loren Gabel, Patty Kazmaier Award winner
