= 2018–19 Colgate Raiders women's ice hockey season =

- Conference: ECAC
- Home ice: Class of 1965 Arena

Record
- Overall: 23-10-5

Coaches and captains
- Head coach: Greg Fargo
- Captain: Jessie Eldridge

== Offseason ==
=== Recruiting ===
Player	Position	Nationality	Notes
Tanner Gates	Defense	United States	Skated for the Anaheim Lady Ducks; Was a two-sport star, having participated in lacrosse at El Camino High School
Eleri Mackay	Forward	United States	Played for the North American Hockey Academy, winning three national championships Also spent one season with the Chicago Mission for one season ... Also played soccer at Brookfield East High School

== Regular season ==
=== Standings ===
2018–19 ECAC Hockey standings
	Conference							Overall					
	GP	W	L	T	PTS	GF	GA	GP	W	L	T	GF	GA
#4 Cornell†	22	17	3	2	36	75	32	36	24	6	6	114	61
#10 Colgate	22	15	4	3	33	83	49	38	23	10	5	133	96
#3 Clarkson*	22	16	5	1	33	81	36	40	30	8	2	143	73
#7 Princeton	22	15	4	3	33	83	40	33	20	8	5	116	68
St. Lawrence	22	9	7	6	24	51	46	36	14	15	7	76	87
Quinnipiac	22	9	9	4	22	52	40	36	12	18	6	73	73
Harvard	22	9	9	4	22	46	41	32	12	15	5	74	68
RPI	22	10	11	1	21	33	57	37	14	18	5	50	88
Yale	22	7	12	3	17	49	61	29	8	18	3	62	87
Dartmouth	22	4	16	2	10	30	66	29	5	21	3	39	88
Brown	22	2	16	4	8	32	88	29	5	20	4	47	109
Union	22	2	19	1	5	27	86	34	4	28	2	43	129
Championship: March 10, 2019 † indicates conference regular season champion; * indicates conference tournament champion Rankings: USCHO.com

=== Schedule ===
Date	Opponent^{#}	Rank^{#}	Site	Decision	Result	Record
Exhibition
September 23	Shenzhen KRS Vanke Rays		Class of 1965 Arena • Hamilton, NY	Alexa Dobchuk	T 4-4	
Regular Season
September 28	Penn State Nittany Lions		Class of 1965 Arena • Hamilton, NY	Julia Vandyk	W 3-1	1-0-0 (0-0-0)
September 29	Penn State Nittany Lions		Class of 1965 Arena • Hamilton, NY	L 2-4	1-1-0 (0-0-0)	
October 5	at #5 Ohio State Buckeyes		OSU Arena • Columbus, OH	L 3-4	1-2-0 (0-0-0)	
October 6	at #5 Ohio State Buckeyes		OSU Arena • Columbus, OH	W 5-2	2-2-0 (0-0-0)	
October 12	at #9 Northeastern Huskies		Matthews Arena • Boston, MA	Julia Vandyk	W 3-2	3-2-0 (0-0-0)
October 13	at #9 Northeastern Huskies		Matthews Arena • Boston, MA	L 2-5	3-3-0 (0-0-0)	
October 26	Dartmouth Big Green		Class of 1965 Arena • Hamilton, NY	W 6-0	4-3-0 (1-0-0)	
October 27	Harvard Crimson		Class of 1965 Arena • Hamilton, NY	Julia Vandyk	W 1-0	5-3-0 (2-0-0)
November 2	at Brown Bears		Meehan Auditorium • Providence, RI	L 3-4	5-4-0 (2-1-0)	
November 3	at Yale Bulldogs		Ingalls Rink • New Haven, CT	Julia Vandyk	W 5-2	6-4-0 (3-1-0)
November 9	at Robert Morris Colonials		Clearview Arena • Pittsburgh, PA	Julia Vandyk	W 4-3	7-4-0 (3-1-0)
November 10	at Robert Morris Colonials		Clearview Arena • Pittsburgh, PA	Julia Vandyk	T 2-2 ^{OT}	7-4-1 (3-1-1)
November 16	at Princeton Tigers		Hobey Baker Rink • Princeton, NJ	L 0-6	7-5-1 (3-2-1)	
November 17	at Quinnipiac Bobcats		Hamden, CT	Julia Vandyk	T 3-3	7-5-2 (3-2-2)
November 30	#3 Clarkson Golden Knights		Class of 1965 Arena • Hamilton, NY	Julia Vandyk	W 4-1	8-5-2 (4-2-2)
December 1	#9 St. Lawrence Saints		Class of 1965 Arena • Hamilton, NY	Julia Vandyk	W 5-1	9-5-2 (5-2-2)
December 6	at Syracuse Orange		Tennity Ice Pavilion • Syracuse, NY	Julia Vandyk	W 5-2	10-5-2
December 8	Syracuse Orange		Class of 1965 Arena • Hamilton, NY	Julia Vandyk	W 4-2	11-5-2
January 5	at Mercyhurst Lakers		Mercyhurst Ice Center • Erie, PA	Julia Vandyk	T 1-1	11-5-3
January 6	at Mercyhurst Lakers		Mercyhurst Ice Center • Erie, PA	Kennedy Blair (MU)	L 5-8	11-6-3
January 11	Quinnipiac Bobcats		Class of 1965 Arena • Hamilton, NY	W 5-2	12-6-3	
January 12	#5 Princeton Tigers		Class of 1965 Arena • Hamilton, NY	T 4-4	12-6-4	
January 18	at Harvard Crimson		Bright-Landry Center • Cambridge, MA	W 4-2	13-6-4	
January 19	at Dartmouth Big Green		Thompson Arena • Hanover, NH	Julia Vandyk	W 5-1	14-6-4
January 25	#6 Cornell Big Red		Class of 1965 Arena • Hamilton, NY	L 2-4	14-7-4	
January 26	at #6 Cornell Big Red		Lynah Rink • Ithaca, NY	L 2-4	14-8-4	
February 1	RPI Engineers		Class of 1965 Arena • Hamilton, NY	W 4-1	15-8-4	
February 2	Union Dutchwomen		Class of 1965 Arena • Hamilton, NY	W 5-2	16-8-4	
February 8	at St. Lawrence Saints		Appleton Arena • Canton, NY	T 2-2	16-8-5	
February 9	at #4 Clarkson Golden Knights		Cheel Arena • Potsdam, NY	W 4-3 ^{OT}	17-8-5	
February 15	Yale Bulldogs		Class of 1965 Arena • Hamilton, NY	W 6-3	18-8-5	
February 16	Brown Bears		Class of 1965 Arena • Hamilton, NY	W 4-0	19-8-5	
February 22	Union Dutchwomen		Messa Rink • Schenectady, NY	W 5-2	20-8-5	
ECAC Tournament
March 1	Harvard Crimson		Class of 1965 Arena • Hamilton, NY	L 2-5	21-9-5	
March 2	Harvard Crimson		Class of 1965 Arena • Hamilton, NY	W 4-2	22-9-5	
March 3	Harvard Crimson		Class of 1965 Arena • Hamilton, NY	W 5-2	23-9-5	
March 9	Clarkson Golden Knights		Lynah Rink • Ithaca, NY	L 0-2	23-10-5	
*Non-conference game. ^{#}Rankings from USCHO.com Poll.

== Roster ==
=== 2018–19 Raiders ===
No.	Nat.	Player	Class	Pos	Height	DoB	Hometown	Previous team
1		Peri Donaldson	Sophomore	G	5' 6" (1.68 m)		Keller, Texas	St. Paul's School (NEPSAC)
3		Olivia Zafuto	Senior	G	5' 6" (1.68 m)		Niagara Falls, New York	Niagara Jr. Purple Eagles
4		Tanner Gates	Freshman	G	5' 6" (1.68 m)		Oceanside, California	Anaheim Lady Ducks
5		Jackie Leone	Sophomore	D	5' 4" (1.63 m)		Andover, Massachusetts	Tabor Academy
8		Kendall Williamson	Sophomore	F	5' 2" (1.57 m)		Edina, Minnesota	Breck School
9		Jessie Eldridge (C)	Junior	F	5' 9" (1.75 m)	1997-12-17	Barrie, Ontario	Toronto Jr. Aeros (PWHL)
12		Shae Labbe	Senior	F	5' 6" (1.68 m)		Calgary, Alberta	Team Canada U18
17		Shelby Wood	Sophomore	D	5' 9" (1.75 m)		Cambridge, Ontario	Team Canada U18
18		Malia Schneider	Sophomore	F	5' 6" (1.68 m)		Millarville, Alberta	Pursuit of Excellence
19		Shannon Ormel	Senior	F	5' 7" (1.7 m)		Winnipeg, Manitoba	Team Manitoba
20		Anonda Hoppner	Junior	F	5' 11" (1.8 m)		Carp, Ontario	Team Canada U18
22		Chelsea Jacques	Senior	D	5' 5" (1.65 m)		Calumet, Michigan	Madison Capitols
26		Bailey Bennett	Sophomore	F	5' 6" (1.68 m)		Gardena, California	Northern Cyclones
28		Livia Altmann	Senior	F	5' 4" (1.63 m)		Arosa, Switzerland	Swiss National Team
31		Liz Auby	Junior	G	5' 6" (1.68 m)		Stoughton, Wisconsin	Madison Capitols
33		Julia Vandyk	Senior	G	5' 8" (1.73 m)		Cambridge, Ontario	Cambridge Jr. Rivulettes
61		Bailey Larson	Senior	F	5' 2" (1.57 m)		Sycamore, Illinois	Team USA U18
81		Rosy Demers	Freshman	F	5' 4" (1.63 m)		Stanstead, Quebec	Stanstead College
91		Coralie Larose	Sophomore	F	5' 7" (1.7 m)		Embrun, Ontario	Nepean Wildcats (PWHL)

== Awards and honors ==
- Jessie Eldridge: ECAC Player of the Month December 2018
- Jessie Eldridge: ECAC Player of the Month February 2019
- Jessie Eldridge: Women’s Hockey Commissioners Association Player of the Month - February 2019
