= Derraugh =

Derraugh is a surname. Notable people with the surname include:

- Doug Derraugh (born 1968), Canadian ice hockey coach
- Tyler Derraugh (born 1986), Canadian speed skater
