= Princeton Tigers ice hockey =

Princeton Tigers ice hockey may refer to either of the ice hockey teams that represent Princeton University:

- Princeton Tigers men's ice hockey
- Princeton Tigers women's ice hockey
