= Cornell Big Red ice hockey =

Cornell Big Red ice hockey may refer to either of the ice hockey teams that represent Cornell University:

- Cornell Big Red men's ice hockey
- Cornell Big Red women's ice hockey
