= Issy (name) =

Issy is a given name. Notable persons with that name include:

- Issy Bonn (1903-1977), British actor
- Issy van Randwyck, English actor
- Issy Sharp (born 1931), Canadian hotelier and writer
- Issy Smith (1890-1940), British-Australian soldier
- Issy Wong (born 2002), English cricketer
- Issy Wunder (born 2003), Canadian ice hockey player

== See also ==
- GPSO 92 Issy, French women's football team
