= Jane Kuehl =

American ice hockey player (born 2003)

- Born: October 18, 2003 (age 22) Minneapolis, Minnesota, U.S.
- Height: 5 ft 6 in (168 cm)
- Position: Forward
- Shoots: Left
- PWHL team: Toronto Sceptres
- Playing career: 2022–present

Jane Kuehl (born October 18, 2003) is an American professional ice hockey forward for the Toronto Sceptres of the Professional Women's Hockey League (PWHL). She played college ice hockey at Princeton.

== Early life ==
Kuehl attended Edina High School in Edina, Minnesota, where she played ice hockey and won two state titles in 2019 and 2021.

== Playing career ==
=== College ===
Kuehl began her college ice hockey career for Princeton during the 2022–23 season. During her freshman year, she recorded three goals and four assists in 31 games. During the 2023–24 season, in her sophomore year, she recorded seven goals and seven assists in 32 games. During the 2024–25 season, in her junior year, she recorded five goals and 14 assists in 32 games. During the 2025–26 season, in her senior year, she recorded a career-high 13 goals and 14 assists in 34 games.

=== Professional ===
On June 17, 2026, Kuehl was drafted in the fourth round, 44th overall, by the Toronto Sceptres in the 2026 PWHL Draft. She was one of three Princeton graduates selected in the Draft, including Emerson O'Leary and Issy Wunder.

== Early life ==
Kuehl's father, Tim, played college ice hockey at Notre Dame, and professionally in Sweden. Her sister, Annie, also played college ice hockey at Princeton.

== Career statistics ==
			Regular season					Playoffs
Season	Team	League	GP	G	A	Pts	PIM	GP	G	A	Pts	PIM
2022–23	Princeton University	ECAC	31	3	4	7	14	—	—	—	—	—
2023–24	Princeton University	ECAC	32	7	7	14	0	—	—	—	—	—
2024–25	Princeton University	ECAC	32	5	14	19	12	—	—	—	—	—
2025–26	Princeton University	ECAC	34	13	14	27	6	—	—	—	—	—
NCAA totals			129	28	39	67	32	—	—	—	—	—
