= Mollie Marcoux =

American athletics administrator

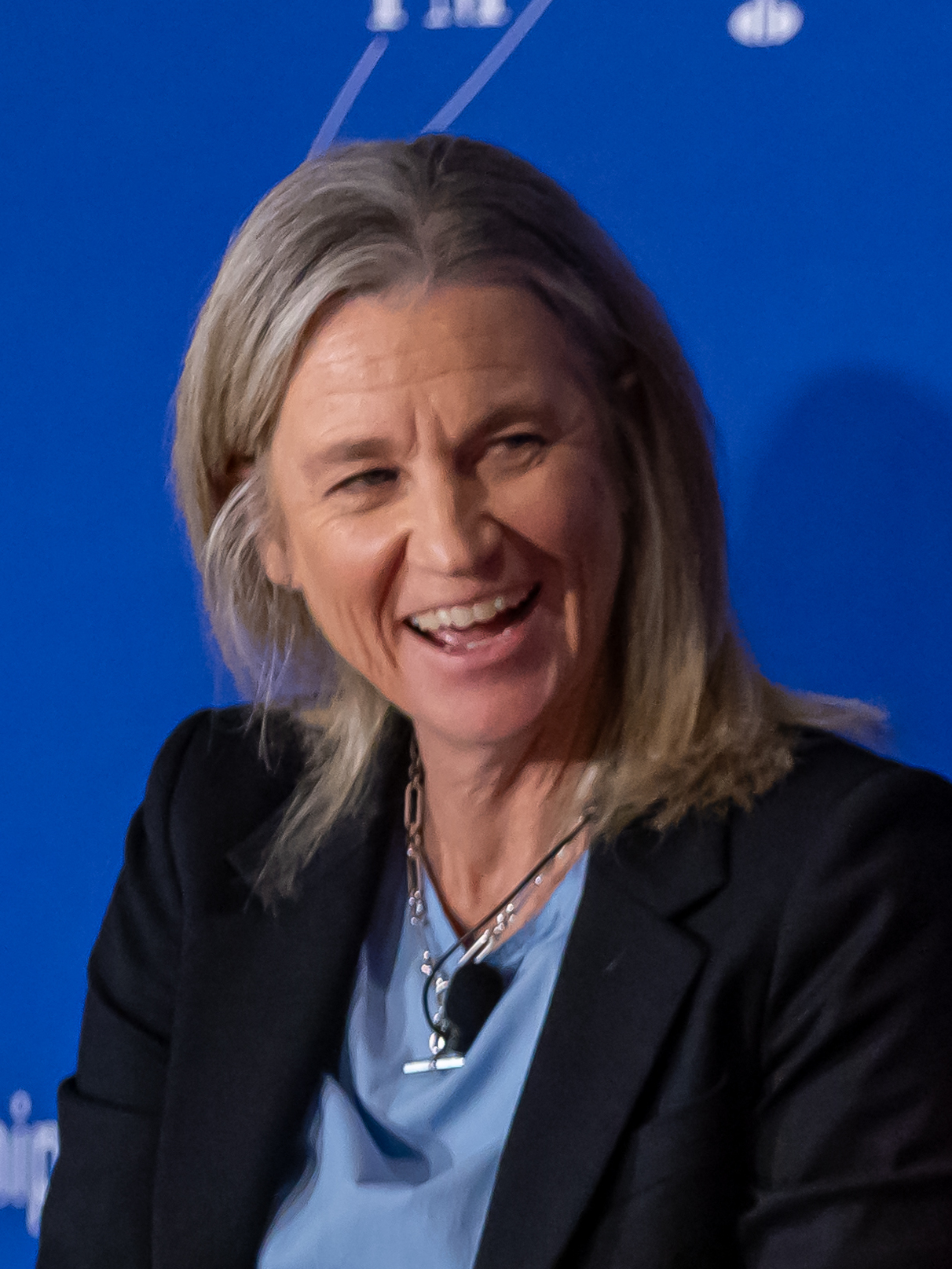
- Marcoux in 2023

Current position
- Title: Commissioner
- Team: LPGA

Playing career

Ice hockey
- 1987–1991: Princeton

Soccer
- 1987–1990: Princeton

Administrative career (AD unless noted)
- 2014–2021: Princeton
- 2021–2025: LPGA (Commissioner)

Mollie Marcoux Samaan is an American athletics administrator who has served as the commissioner of the Ladies Professional Golf Association (LGPA). Marcoux was athletic director at Princeton University from 2014 to 2021. Prior to her career in athletic administration, she was, for nineteen years, an executive for Chelsea Piers Management in Connecticut. Marcoux, a native of Ithaca, New York, attended college at Princeton University, where she played on the school's women's ice hockey and soccer teams. In four seasons, she scored 18 goals and recorded 11 assists as a forward for the soccer team, and as a forward in hockey she is ranked second in both goals and assists at the school with 120 and 96, respectively. Marcoux was named athletic director at Princeton University on April 15, 2014. She was appointed to be the ninth commissioner of the LPGA in May 2021.
