= Emerson O'Leary =

- Born: January 16, 2004 (age 22) Scarborough, Massachusetts
- Height: 5 ft 7 in (170 cm)
- Position: Forward
- Shot: Right
- PWHL team Former teams: Toronto Sceptres; Princeton Tigers (ECAC)
- Playing career: 2026–2026

Emerson O'Leary (born January 16, 2004) is a professional ice hockey forward drafted by the Toronto Sceptres of the Professional Women's Hockey League. She played her college ice hockey with Princeton.

== Playing career ==
=== College ===
During the 2025-26 season, O'Leary appeared in all 34 games for Princeton. She led the club with 22 assists. In addition, she ranked fifth in the ECAC with 399 face-off wins. She graduated from Princeton with 80 career assists and 103 career points.

=== Professional ===
On June 17, 2026, O'Leary was selected fifty-sixth overall in the 2026 PWHL Draft. She was one of three Princeton graduates selected in the Draft, including Jane Kuehl and Issy Wunder. On October 7th, 2026, it was reported that O'Leary had decided to retire from hockey and would not be reporting to Sceptres training camp.

== Awards and honors ==
- ECAC All-Academic Team (2022-23)
