= 2018–19 Bemidji State Beavers women's ice hockey season =

- Conference: 5th WCHA
- Home ice: Sanford Center

Record
- Overall: 13–21–2 (10–12–2 in conference play)
- Home: 8–8–1
- Road: 5–12–1
- Neutral: 0–1–0

Coaches and captains
- Head coach: James Scanlan
- Assistant coaches: Amber Fryklund; Shane Veenker
- Captain: Melissa Hunt
- Alternate captain(s): Emily Bergland; Kiki Radke

The 2018–19 Bemidji State Beavers women's ice hockey season represented the Bemidji State University during the 2018-19 NCAA Division I women's ice hockey season.

== Offseason ==
=== 2018–19 Beavers ===
No.	Nat.	Player	Class	Pos	Height	DoB	Hometown	Previous team
2		Mak Langei	Sophomore	D	5' 5" (1.65 m)		East Grand Forks, Minnesota	Shattuck St. Mary's
3		Lydia Passolt	Sophomore	F	5' 6" (1.68 m)		Chanhassen, Minnesota	Chanhassen HS
4		Kara Werth	Sophomore	D	5' 7" (1.7 m)		Moorhead, Minnesota	Moorhead HS
5		Melissa Hunt (C)	Senior	D	5' 6" (1.68 m)		Hartney, Manitoba	Westman Wildcats
6		Claudia Verkerke	Freshman	F	5' 8" (1.73 m)		White Bear Lake, Minnesota	White Bear Lake HS
7		Abby Ecker	Freshman (RS)	D	5' 8" (1.73 m)		Grey Eagle, Minnesota	Long Prairie-Grey Eagle HS
8		Kiki Radke (A)	Junior	F	5' 3" (1.6 m)		Hastings, Minnesota	Hastings HS
9		Emily Bergland (A)	Senior	F	5' 6" (1.68 m)		Thief River Falls, Minnesota	Lincoln HS
10		Lindsey Featherstone		F	5' 4" (1.63 m)		Woodbury, Minnesota	Hill Murray HS
11		Tina Kampa	Sophomore	D	5' 0" (1.52 m)		Maple Grove, Minnesota	Maple Grove HS
12		Jacqueline Kaasa	Junior	F	5' 3" (1.6 m)		North Hudson, Wisconsin	Hill Murray HS
14		Briana Jorde	Junior	D	5' 3" (1.6 m)		Thief River Falls, Minnesota	Lincoln HS
16		Ellie Moser	Freshman	F	5' 8" (1.73 m)		Farmington, Minnesota	Farmington HS
17		Lexi Cheveldayoff	Freshman	D	5' 10" (1.78 m)		Boca Raton, Florida	St. Mary's Academy
18		Paige Beebe	Sophomore	F	5' 7" (1.7 m)		Blaine, Minnesota	Blaine HS
19		Haley Mack	Junior	F	5' 3" (1.6 m)		East Grand Forks, Minnesota	Minnesota Revolution
20		Heather Olson	Junior	D	5' 7" (1.7 m)		Bemidji, Minnesota	Bemidji HS
21		Abby Halluska	Junior	F	5' 9" (1.75 m)		Delano, Minnesota	Buffalo HS
23		Graysen Myers	Freshman	F	5' 7" (1.7 m)		Fargo, North Dakota	Fargo South HS
26		Clair DeGeorge	Sophomore	F	5' 10" (1.78 m)		Anchorage, Alaska	Shattuck St. Mary's
30		Lexi Baker	Freshman	G	5' 7" (1.7 m)		Lakeville, Minnesota	Lakeville South HS
33		Kerigan Dowhy	Sophomore	G	5' 6" (1.68 m)		The Pas, Manitoba	Interlake Lightning
35		Lauren Bench	Sophomore (RS)	G	5' 10" (1.78 m)		Eagan, Minnesota	Burnsville HS

== Standings ==
2018–19 Western Collegiate Hockey Association standings
	Conference								Overall					
	GP	W	L	T	SW	PTS	GF	GA	GP	W	L	T	GF	GA
#2 Minnesota†	24	19	4	1	0	58	95	48	39	32	6	1	160	69
#1 Wisconsin*	24	18	4	2	0	56	78	26	41	35	4	2	155	43
#9 Ohio State	24	12	10	2	2	40	57	58	35	20	13	2	95	82
Minnesota Duluth	35	24	9	11	4	35	63	69	35	15	16	4	92	99
Bemidji State	24	10	12	2	0	32	49	67	36	13	21	2	75	103
Minnesota State	24	3	16	5	2	16	41	71	35	9	19	7	64	91
St. Cloud State	24	5	19	0	0	15	38	82	37	10	25	2	66	119
Championship: March 10, 2019 † indicates conference regular season champion; * indicates conference tournament champion Rankings: USCHO.com

== 2018–19 Schedule ==
Date	Opponent^{#}	Rank^{#}	Site	Decision	Result	Record
Regular Season
September 28	#1 Clarkson*		Sanford Center • Bemidji, MN	Lauren Bench	L 1–5	0–1–0
September 29	#1 Clarkson*		Sanford Center • Bemidji, MN	Kerigan Dowhy	L 3–5	0–2–0
October 5	at Providence*		Schneider Arena • Providence, RI	Kerigan Dowhy	L 1–4	0–3–0
October 6	at Providence*		Schneider Arena • Providence, RI	Lauren Bench	L 3–4	0–4–0
October 19	at #5 Minnesota Duluth		AMSOIL Arena • Duluth, MN	Kerigan Dowhy	L 1–6	0–5–0 (0–1–0)
October 20	at #5 Minnesota Duluth		AMSOIL Arena • Duluth, MN	Lauren Bench	L 0–2	0–6–0 (0–2–0)
October 26	Minnesota State		Sanford Center • Bemidji, MN	Lauren Bench	L 1–4	0–7–0 (0–3–0)
October 27	Minnesota State		Sanford Center • Bemidji, MN	Lauren Bench	T 0–0 ^{OT}	0–7–1 (0–3–1)
November 2	at #2 Minnesota		Ridder Arena • Minneapolis, MN	Lauren Bench	L 3–6	0–8–1 (0–4–1)
November 3	at #2 Minnesota		Ridder Arena • Minneapolis, MN	Kerigan Dowhy	L 1–2	0–9–1 (0–5–1)
November 9	#4 Ohio State		Sanford Center • Bemidji, MN	Kerigan Dowhy	W 2–1	1–9–1 (1–5–1)
November 10	#4 Ohio State		Sanford Center • Bemidji, MN	Kerigan Dowhy	W 4–2	2–9–1 (2–5–1)
November 16	at #1 Wisconsin		LaBahn Arena • Madison, WI	Kerigan Dowhy	L 0–5	2–10–1 (2–6–1)
November 17	at #1 Wisconsin		LaBahn Arena • Madison, WI	Kerigan Dowhy	L 0–3	2–11–1 (2–7–1)
November 20	vs. St. Cloud State*		Essentia Sports Health Center • Brainerd, MN (US Hockey Hall of Fame Classic)	Kerigan Dowhy	L 0–3	2–12–1
November 30	St. Cloud State		Sanford Center • Bemidji, MN	Lauren Bench	W 3–0	3–12–1 (3–7–1)
December 1	St. Cloud State		Sanford Center • Bemidji, MN	Lauren Bench	W 2–0	4–12–1 (4–7–1)
December 7	at Mercyhurst*		Mercyhurst Ice Center • Erie, PA	Lauren Bench	L 0–3	4–13–1
December 8	at Mercyhurst*		Mercyhurst Ice Center • Erie, PA	Kerigan Dowhy	W 3–1	5–13–1
January 4, 2019	Union*		Sanford Center • Bemidji, MN	Lauren Bench	W 3–0	6–13–1
January 5	Union*		Sanford Center • Bemidji, MN	Kerigan Dowhy	W 6–2	7–13–1
January 11	Minnesota Duluth		Sanford Center • Bemidji, MN	Lauren Bench	W 4–1	8–13–1 (5–7–1)
January 12	Minnesota Duluth		Sanford Center • Bemidji, MN	Lauren Bench	L 2–5	8–14–1 (5–8–1)
January 19	Minnesota State*		Hockey Day Minnesota Rink (outdoors) • Bemidji, MN (Hockey Day in Minnesota)	Lexi Baker	L 1–2	8–15–1
January 25	at Minnesota State		Verizon Wireless Center • Mankato, MN	Lauren Bench	W 5–2	9–15–1 (6–8–1)
January 26	at Minnesota State		Verizon Wireless Center • Mankato, MN	Lauren Bench	T 3–3 ^{OT}	9–15–2 (6–8–2)
February 1	#1 Wisconsin		Sanford Center • Bemidji, MN	Lauren Bench	W 2–1	10–15–2 (7–8–2)
February 2	#1 Wisconsin		Sanford Center • Bemidji, MN	Kerigan Dowhy	L 0–4	10–16–2 (7–9–2)
February 8	at #9 Ohio State		OSU Ice Rink • Columbus, OH	Lauren Bench	W 3–2	11–16–2 (8–9–2)
February 9	at #9 Ohio State		OSU Ice Rink • Columbus, OH	Lauren Bench	L 1–5	11–17–2 (8–10–2)
February 15	at St. Cloud State		Herb Brooks National Hockey Center • St. Cloud, MN	Lauren Bench	W 4–2	12–17–2 (9–10–2)
February 16	at St. Cloud State		Herb Brooks National Hockey Center • St. Cloud, MN	Lauren Bench	W 2–1 ^{OT}	13–17–2 (10–10–2)
February 22	Minnesota		Sanford Center • Bemidji, MN	Lauren Bench	L 3–6	13–18–2 (10–11–2)
February 23	Minnesota		Sanford Center • Bemidji, MN	Kerigan Dowhy	L 3–4	13–19–2 (10–12–2)
WCHA Tournament
March 1	at Minnesota Duluth*		AMSOIL Arena • Duluth, MN (Quarterfinals, Game 1)	Lauren Bench	L 2–3	13–20–2
March 2	at Minnesota Duluth*		AMSOIL Arena • Duluth, MN (Quarterfinals, Game 2)	Lauren Bench	L 3–4	13–20–2
*Non-conference game. ^{#}Rankings from USCHO.com Poll.
