= Issy Wunder =

Canadian ice hockey player (born 2003)

- Born: December 15, 2003 (age 22) Toronto, Ontario, Canada
- Height: 5 ft 11 in (180 cm)
- Position: Forward
- Shoots: Right
- PWHL team Former teams: Vegas Vanguards; Princeton Tigers
- Playing career: 2022–present

Isabel Wunder (born December 15, 2003) is a Canadian college ice hockey forward for Princeton. She was selected by the Vegas Vanguards in the second round of the 2026 PWHL Draft.

== Playing career ==
=== College ===
Wunder began her college ice hockey career for Princeton during the 2022–23 season. During her freshman year she recorded nine goals and nine assists in 31 games. She led Princeton rookies in goals and points. During the 2023–24 season, in her sophomore year, she recorded eight goals and 27 assists in 32 games. She led the team in assists and ranked second on the team with 35 points. Following the season she was named a second-team All-Ivy League honouree.

During the 2024–25 season, in her junior year, she recorded 26 goals and 24 assists in 32 games. She opened the season on a 13-game point streak. Her 1.63 points per game ranked fourth in the country. Following the season she was named Ivy League Player of the Year. She was also named to the ECAC All-First Team, ECAC Forward of the Year, and a top-ten finalist for the Patty Kazmaier Award.

During the 2025–26 season, in her senior year, she recorded 27 goals and 16 assists in 34 games. She finished tied for first in the Ivy League with 41 points and led the league with 1.41 points per game. Following the season she was named to a first-team all-Ivy League honouree and Ivy League Player of the Year for the second consecutive year. She became the first athlete to receive the honour in consecutive seasons, and the second to win the award twice, following Brianne Jenner. She was also named to the ECAC All-First Team and a top-ten finalist for the Patty Kazmaier Award for the second consecutive season.

=== Professional ===
In the 2026 PWHL Draft, Wunder was selected in the second round, 13th overall, by the Vegas Vanguards expansion team. She was one of three Princeton graduates selected in the Draft, including Jane Kuehl and Emerson O'Leary. On October 6, 2026, the team announced that she had signed a two-year standard player agreement through the 2027–28 season.

== Personal life ==
Wunder was born to Michael Wunder and Joanna Sugar and has two younger brothers, Teddy and Luke. She graduated from Tanenbaum Community Hebrew Academy of Toronto in 2021. While attending Princeton University she majored in psychology with a minor in neuroscience.

== Career statistics ==
			Regular season					Playoffs
Season	Team	League	GP	G	A	Pts	PIM	GP	G	A	Pts	PIM
2022–23	Princeton University	ECAC	31	9	9	18	31	—	—	—	—	—
2023–24	Princeton University	ECAC	32	8	27	35	19	—	—	—	—	—
2024–25	Princeton University	ECAC	32	26	24	50	29	—	—	—	—	—
2025–26	Princeton University	ECAC	34	27	16	43	6	—	—	—	—	—
NCAA totals			129	70	76	146	85	—	—	—	—	—

== Awards and honours ==
Honors	Year	Ref
College
ECAC All-First Team	2025	
ECAC Forward of the Year	2025	
Ivy League Player of the Year	2025	
ECAC All-First Team	2026	
Ivy League Player of the Year	2026	
