= Amy Curlew =

Canadian ice hockey player

- Born: February 5, 1998 (age 27); Happy Valley-Goose Bay, Newfoundland, Canada
- Height: 5 ft 3 in (160 cm)
- Position: Forward
- Shot: Left
- Played for: Toronto Six
- Playing career: 2016–2022

Amy Roxanne Curlew is a Canadian ice hockey forward who most recently played for the Toronto Six of the Premier Hockey Federation (PHF).

== Career ==
In high school, she played for the girls' hockey team at Appleby College and for the Oakville Hornets of the Provincial Women's Hockey League (PWHL), winning the 2015 Ontario Women's Hockey Association (OWHA) Provincial Championship.

From 2016 to 2020, she attended Cornell University where she played 121 NCAA Division I games with the Cornell Big Red and scored 60 points. She missed the first five games of her rookie season before picking up her first point on November 26, 2016 and her first goal a week later. She scored her first collegiate hat-trick in November 2019, scoring all three in the second period of a 9–1 victory over Brown University. After finishing the 2019–20 season ranked first for the first time in program history, the Cornell Big Red had a chance at winning their first ever NCAA title before the 2020 NCAA National Collegiate Women's Ice Hockey Tournament was cancelled due to the COVID-19 pandemic. After news of the cancellation broke, she and the other five seniors on the team met with the team's staff to discuss rumours that their college eligibility could be extended by a year.

She was drafted 8th overall by the expansion Toronto Six in the 2020 NWHL Draft. She signed her first professional contract with the club ahead of the 2020–21 NWHL season.

== Personal life ==
Curlew obtained her bachelor's degree in communication and media studies with a minor in horticulture from Cornell University.
