= Doug Derraugh =

Canadian ice hockey player and coach

Current position
- Title: Head Coach
- Team: Cornell University
- Conference: ECAC Hockey
- Record: 325-180-49

Biographical details
- Born: September 28, 1968 (age 58); Arnprior, Ontario, Canada
- Education: Cornell University

Playing career
- 1987–1991: Cornell University
- 1992–1994: Rosenheim SB
- 1994–1995: Graz EC
- 1995–1997: Star Bulls Rosenheim
- 1997–1998: Berlin Capitals
- 1998–1999: Bolzano HC
- 1998–1999: SaiPa Lappeenranta
- 1999–2001: Berlin Capitals
- 2001–2003: Kassel Huskies
- 2003–2004: Landshut Cannibals

Coaching career (HC unless noted)
- 2005–present: Cornell University

Accomplishments and honors

Awards
- 3× AHCA Coach of the Year (2010, 2019, 2020); 5× ECAC Coach of the Year (2011, 2013, 2017, 2019, 2020); 5× Ivy League Coach of the Year (2017–2020, 2024)

Doug Derraugh (born September 28, 1968) is the head coach of the women's ice hockey team at Cornell University where he has a record of 325-180-49 through the 2022-23 season after 19 seasons as coach. He is the most successful coach in the history of the program. He was the AHCA Coach of the Year in 2010, 2019 and 2020.

== Playing career ==
Derraugh played for four seasons at Cornell from 1987–88 through 1990–91. He served as co-captain in his senior year when he led his team in scoring with 30 goals and 36 assists, earning him All-Ivy Second Team honors, and helped the team earn a trip to the NCAA Tournament. He is 10th all-time at Cornell in career scoring with 153 points on 66 goals and 87 assists in 119 games. After graduating he played professionally for 13 seasons in Europe, primarily in Germany's Deutsche Eishockey Liga.

== Coaching career ==
Derraugh was hired as head coach beginning with the 2005–2006 season. In the year prior to his arrival Cornell had a record 3–22–3 and had not had a winning season since 1997–1998. In his first two seasons the team still only managed fewer than 10 victories and failed to make the ECAC playoffs. In the following two seasons the team would qualify for the ECAC playoffs, falling in the quarterfinals each time. The 2009–2010 season was a breakout year for the program. The team won the ECAC regular season title and the league tournament championship, both for the first time, defeating Clarkson in the championship game. The team also won the Ivy League title for the first time since 1996. The team advanced to the NCAA tournament for the first time and reached the championship game where they fell to Minnesota Duluth in triple-overtime. Derraugh was named AHCA Coach of the Year.

Cornell's success continued in the following years. Cornell was the ECAC regular season champion in 2011, 2012, 2013, 2019 and 2020 and the ECAC tournament champion in 2010, 2011, 2013 and 2014. They were the Ivy League Champion in 2010, 2011, 2012, 2013, 2017, 2018, 2020 and 2024. They reached the NCAA Frozen Four again in 2011, 2012 and 2019 and played in the NCAA quarterfinals in 2013, 2014 and 2017. Derraugh was named AHCA Division 1 Coach of the Year for a second time in 2019 and again in 2020.

== Year by year ==
Year	Wins	Losses	Ties	Postseason
2013–14	24	6	4	ECAC Tournament Champions
2012–13	27	6	1	ECAC Tournament and Regular Season Champions, Ivy League Champions*
2011–12	30	5	0	NCAA Frozen Four, ECAC Regular Season Champions, Ivy League Champions
2010–11	31	3	1	NCAA Frozen Four, ECAC Tournament and Regular Season Champions, Ivy League Champions
2009–10	21	9	6	National Runner-up, NCAA Frozen Four, ECAC Tournament and Regular Season Champions, Ivy League Champions
2008–09	12	14	5	Lost in ECAC Quarterfinals
2007–08	12	17	1	Lost in ECAC Quarterfinals
2006–07	4	23	2	Did not qualify
2005–06	9	18	1	Did not qualify

*Denotes Shared Title

== See also ==
- List of college women's ice hockey career coaching wins leaders
