= 2008–09 Cornell Big Red women's ice hockey season =

- Conference: ECAC
- Home ice: Lynah Rink

Rankings
- USA Today/USA Hockey Magazine: Not ranked
- USCHO.com/CBS College Sports: Not ranked

Record
- Overall: 12–14–5

Coaches and captains
- Head coach: Doug Derraugh
- Assistant coaches: Danielle Bilodeau; Kim Insalaco

The 2008–09 Cornell Big Red women's ice hockey team represented Cornell University in the 2008–09 NCAA Division I women's hockey season. Doug Derraugh was in his fourth season as head coach. He is assisted by Danielle Bilodeau and Kim Insalaco. The seniors on the team are Emma Chipman, Brianne Gilbert and Steph Ulrich.

== Preseason ==
- In the preseason coaches poll, Cornell was selected to finish fifth in the ECAC. Harvard led the poll with 10 first-place votes. Rebecca Johnston was honoured with a spot on the 2008 ECAC Preseason All-League team.
- October 5: The Big Red hockey players raised over $1,600 for the American Cancer Society's Making Strides Against Breast Cancer.

== Regular season ==
- January 13: The Big Red beat Union by a score of 3–0. Every Cornell player had at least one shot on goal. Senior Brianne Gilbert led the team in shots with 8. The Big Red had 50 shots for the first time since the 05–06 season. On February 5, 2006, Cornell had 58 shots against Union.
- By mid-February, sophomore Rebecca Johnston was leading the Big Red with 37 points. Johnston's 37 points leads the entire ECAC league in overall points. She is also second in the league and sixth in the NCAA in points per game with 1.85. Johnston's total was the most points in a season for Cornell since the 1991–92 campaign. In that season, senior Kim Ratushny scored 38 points. Freshman Catherine White was second on the team in scoring (34 points). White's point total is fourth in ECAC scoring. White has recorded the most points by a rookie since Dana Antal (36 points, 17 goals, 19 assists) in the 1995–96 season.
- The Big Red's games against Harvard (February 13) and Dartmouth (February 14) were part of a promotion between ECAC Hockey and the American Cancer Society called Pink at the Rink. Cornell wore pink jerseys and honored its three seniors after Saturday's match.

== International ==
- Rebecca Johnston was a member of Canada's Under-22 Team. The U-22 participated in the MLP Cup, held in Ravensburg, Germany from Jan. 2–6, 2009. Johnston was part of the silver medal-winning team. In the tournament, Johnston accumulated seven points (3 goals, 4 assists). Her best game was in an 11–0 victory over Russia. Johnston scored a hat trick and added an assist. In addition to the MLP Cup, Johnston played with the Canadian Senior Team in the Four Nations Cup between Nov. 4–9, 2009. Johnston was part of the silver medal-winning team.

== Player stats ==
= Indicates team leader

=== Skaters ===
Player	Games	Goals	Assists	Points	Points/game	PIM	GWG	PPG	SHG
Rebecca Johnston	26	25	20	45	1.7308	16	4	8	0
Catherine White	31	18	26	44	1.4194	28	3	6	0
Chelsea Karpenko	28	10	11	21	0.7500	31	0	1	0
Karlee Overguard	31	7	13	20	0.6452	28	2	3	0
Stephanie Holmes	16	3	13	16	1.0000	12	0	1	1
Liz Zorn	29	7	7	14	0.4828	18	1	5	1
Jess Martino	31	1	13	14	0.4516	8	0	0	0
Laura Danforth	31	6	6	12	0.3871	16	0	2	1
Sam Wauer	31	2	9	11	0.3548	28	0	1	0
Amanda Young	23	0	11	11	0.4783	34	0	0	0
Melanie Jue	27	2	7	9	0.3333	10	1	1	0
Emma Chipman	25	2	3	5	0.2000	10	0	0	0
Amber Overguard	19	2	2	4	0.2105	20	0	1	0
Brianne Gilbert	27	1	3	4	0.1481	4	0	0	0
Kendice Ogilvie	30	1	3	4	0.1333	20	0	0	0
Amber Moore	16	1	3	4	0.2500	30	0	0	0
Hayley Hughes	16	2	1	3	0.1875	12	0	0	0
Ashley Duffy	16	2	1	3	0.1875	4	1	0	0
Kelly McGinty	24	0	2	2	0.0833	2	0	0	0
Jenny Niesluchowski	18	0	1	1	0.0556	2	0	0	0
Amanda Mazzotta	6	0	0	0	0.0000	0	0	0	0
Steph Ulrich	17	0	0	0	0.0000	8	0	0	0
Jenna Paulson	22	0	0	0	0.0000	0	0	0	0
Kayla Strong	9	0	0	0	0.0000	0	0	0	0

=== Goaltenders ===
Player	Games	Wins	Losses	Ties	Goals against	Minutes	GAA	Shutouts	Saves	Save %
Kayla Strong	9	4	4	1	18	521	2.0718	1	225	.926
Jenny Niesluchowski	18	7	7	2	44	1031	2.5613	2	479	.916
Amanda Mazzotta	6	1	3	2	14	327	2.5662	1	140	.909

== Awards and honors ==
- Rebecca Johnston, 2008 ECAC Women's Hockey Preseason All-League team
- Rebecca Johnston, Forward, 2009 First Team All-ECAC
- Catherine White, 2009 ECAC Rookie of the Year
