= Cornell Big Red women's ice hockey =

Women's ice hockey team of Cornell University

- Current season
- University: Cornell University
- Conference: ECAC
- Head coach: Doug Derraugh; 21st season, 267–150–42
- Arena: Lynah Rink; Ithaca, New York
- Colors: Carnelian and white
- Fight song: Give My Regards to Davy

NCAA tournament runner-up
- 2010

NCAA tournament Frozen Four
- 2010, 2011, 2012, 2019, 2025

NCAA tournament appearances
- 2010, 2011, 2012, 2013, 2014, 2017, 2019, 2020, 2024, 2025

Conference tournament champions
- 2010, 2011, 2013, 2014, 2025

Conference regular season champions
- 2010, 2011, 2012, 2013, 2019, 2020, 2025

Ivy League regular season champions
- 1976, 1977, 1978, 1979, 1980, 1981, 1990, 1996, 2010, 2011, 2012, 2013, 2017, 2018, 2020, 2024, 2025, 2026

The Cornell Big Red women's ice hockey program that is representing Cornell University and they currently participate in Division I collegiate hockey in the ECAC Hockey conference. They play at the Lynah Rink in Ithaca, New York.

The Ivy League announced in July 2020 that they would suspend play for all sports, including women's ice hockey, in the Fall 2020, due to the Coronavirus outbreak. Athletics resumed in fall of 2021.

== History ==
The Cornell women's hockey program was started in 1971. It would only be in 1972 that the team would play its first game; it was a 4–3 victory over Scarborough. In 1972, they played eight games and lost four. In addition, the Big Red lost twice to the Pandas's program.

In 1976, Brown hosted the first ever Ivy League women's ice hockey tournament. Cornell bested Brown, Princeton and Yale to win the tournament.

On March 7, 2010, sophomore Kendice Ogilvie beat Clarkson goaltender Lauren Dahm at 7:52 mark in overtime. With the victory, Cornell won its first ECAC Tournament, and earns its first trip to the NCAA Frozen Four.

On March 13, 2010, Cornell defeated the Crimson by a score of 6–2 to earn its first ever trip to the NCAA Frozen Four. At the 2010 Frozen Four championship game, Cornell goaltender Amanda Mazzotta set a record for most saves in an NCAA Championship game with 61 saves. The former record holder was Bulldog goaltender Patricia Sautter. She had the old record of 41 set in 2003.

On January 7 and 8, 2011, Cornell freshman goaltender Lauren Slebodnik earned two shutouts in her first two career starts. On January 7, she made her NCAA debut by shutting out Yale by a 5–0 margin. With Cornell dressing just 12 skaters, she stopped all 23 Yale shots. The following night, Slebodnik shut out the Brown Bears by a 3–0 mark. Cornell only dressed 11 skaters for the game and she stopped all 15 shots.

In Jillian Saulnier's college debut versus the Colgate Raiders on October 25, she netted four goals. In her first three career NCAA games, she registered ten points (seven goals, three assists), along with a +6 rating. Her four-goal night was the first for Cornell since Jessica Campbell scored four against Robert Morris in the second game of the 2010–11 season. She scored her first career goal when she was out on the Big Red's first power play of the game. In her next game versus the Yale Bulldogs, she registered one goal and two assists, while scoring two goals in her third game versus the Brown Bears squad. For the month of October 2011, she was tied for first in the ECAC in goals scored (while the other player appeared in eight games). In a game on November 1, 2011, the Cornell Big Red scored at least nine goals in one game for the third consecutive contest. It was senior captain Chelsea Karpenko's 100th career game, as Saulnier led all Big Red players with two goals and three assists in a 9–2 triumph over the Syracuse Orange.

The Big Red had a standout year in 2019, finishing the season atop the standings in the ECAC. They lost in the ECAC championship game against Clarkson.

In 2020, Cornell finished first in the ECAC for the second year in a row, with an undefeated season in conference play at 19-0-3 (28-2-3 overall). They dominated the league and had an unbeaten streak of 22 games from November 30, 2019 to March 7, 2020. The Big Red easily won their 15th Ivy League championship. In the ECAC tournament, Cornell beat perennial rival Harvard Crimson in the semi-final by a score of 4-0. In a surprising upset in the championship game, they lost in overtime to the Princeton Tigers by a score of 3-2. Jessie Eldridge finished the season fourth in the ECAC in points, with 43, followed by her teammate Kristin O'Neil, who tallied 41 points on the year. Izzy Daniel won Ivy League Rookie of the Year. Lindsay Browning, the Big Red's junior goalie, won Ivy League Player of the Year honors, and the MAC Goaltending Goalie of the Year. Jaime Bourbonnais won Ivy League Best Defenseman honors, and was selected as a First Team All-American. Head Coach Doug Derraugh was recognized with two Coach of the Year awards: the Ivy League Coach of the Year (his fourth in a row) and the ECAC Hockey Coach of the Year (second in a row).

Cornell earned a berth in the 2020 NCAA women's ice hockey tournament, but the event was cancelled due to the 2020 coronavirus pandemic. In July 2020, the Ivy League announced there would be no league play in the fall of 2020, due to continuing concerns about health. Cornell, along with fellow Ivy League teams Harvard, Brown, Dartmouth, Princeton and Yale, resumed athletics in the fall of 2021.

The new Toronto Six Women's National Hockey League team signed Cornell alumna Amy Curlew in 2020.

== Year by year ==
Won Championship	Lost Championship	Regular Season Conference Champions

Year	Coach	W	L	T	Conference	Conf. W	Conf. L	Conf. T	Points	Conference Rank	Conf. Tournament	NCAA Tournament
1996–97	Julie Anderberhan	13	15	1	ECAC	11	10	1	23	7th	Lost Quarterfinals vs. Providence (1–3)	Tournament did not exist
1997–98	Julie Anderberhan	15	8	3	ECAC	14	5	3	31	5th	Lost Quarterfinals vs. Brown (0–1)	Tournament did not exist
1998–99	Carol Mullins	15	16	0	ECAC	14	12	0	28	8th	Lost Quarterfinals vs. Harvard (2–3)	Tournament did not exist
1999–2000	Carol Mullins	13	14	1	ECAC	9	14	1	19	10th	—	Tournament did not exist
2000–01	Carol Mullins	10	18	1	ECAC	7	16	1	15	11th	—	—
2001–02	Carol Mullins	9	18	1	ECAC	7	8	1	15	6th	Lost Quarterfinals vs. St. Lawrence (3–4, 1–2 OT)	—
2002–03	Melody Davidson	4	21	2	ECAC	2	12	2	6	8th	Lost Quarterfinals vs. Harvard (1–13, 0–7)	—
2003–04	Melody Davidson	7	21	2	ECAC	3	15	0	6	8th	Lost Quarterfinals vs. Harvard (1–9, 1–4)	—
2004–05	Melody Davidson	3	22	3	ECAC	3	16	1	7	9th	—	—
2005–06	Doug Derraugh	9	18	1	ECAC	5	15	0	10	Tied 9th	—	—
2006–07	Doug Derraugh	4	23	2	ECAC	4	17	1	9	11th	—	—
2007–08	Doug Derraugh	12	17	1	ECAC	9	12	1	19	8th	Lost Quarterfinals vs. Harvard (2–3, 2–4)	—
2008–09	Doug Derraugh	12	14	5	ECAC	8	9	5	21	8th	Lost Quarterfinals vs. Harvard (0–3, 0–4)	—
2009–10	Doug Derraugh	21	9	6	ECAC	14	2	6	34	1st	Won Quarterfinals vs. Colgate(2–1, 5–0); Won Semifinals vs. RPI (5–4); Won Championship vs. Clarkson (4–3 OT)	Won Quarterfinals vs. Harvard (6–2); Won Semifinals vs. Mercyhurst (3–2 OT); Lost Championship vs. Minnesota–Duluth (2–3 3OT)
2010–11	Doug Derraugh	31	3	1	ECAC	20	1	1	41	1st	Won Quarterfinals vs. RPI (3–2 OT, 6–1); Won Semifinals vs. Quinnipiac (4–3); Won Championship vs. Dartmouth (3–0)	Won Quarterfinals vs. Dartmouth (7–1); Lost Semifinals vs. Boston College (1–4)
2011–12	Doug Derraugh	30	5	0	ECAC	20	2	0	40	1st	Won Quarterfinals vs. Brown (4–2, 6–0); Won Semifinals vs. Quinnipiac (5–1); Lost Championship vs. St. Lawrence (1–3)	Won Quarterfinals vs. Boston University (8–7 3OT); Lost Semifinals vs. Minnesota (1–3)
2012–13	Doug Derraugh	27	6	1	ECAC	18	3	1	37	1st	Won Quarterfinals vs. Colgate (5–4 OT, 3–2); Won Semifinals vs. St. Lawrence (4–2); Won Championship vs. Harvard (2–1)	Lost Quarterfinals vs. Mercyhurst (3–4 OT)
2013–14	Doug Derraugh	24	6	4	ECAC	15	4	3	33	3rd	Won Quarterfinals vs. Princeton (3–2, 5–3); Won Semifinals vs. Harvard (6–4); Won Championship vs. Clarkson (1–0)	Lost Quarterfinals vs. Mercyhurst (2–3)
2014–15	Doug Derraugh	19	11	3	ECAC	14	6	2	30	Tied 4th	Won Quarterfinals vs. St. Lawrence (3–1, 3–2); Won Semifinals vs. Clarkson (3–1); Lost Championship vs. Harvard (3–7)	—
2015–16	Doug Derraugh	13	14	4	ECAC	9	9	4	22	7th	Lost Quarterfinals vs. Clarkson (0–2, 2–5)	—
2016–17	Doug Derraugh	20	9	5	ECAC	13	4	5	31	3rd	Won Quarterfinals vs. Colgate (2-1, 1-0); Won Semifinals vs. St. Lawrence (3-1); Lost Championship vs. Clarkson (0-1)	Lost Quarterfinals vs. Clarkson (1-3)
2017–18	Doug Derraugh	21	9	3	ECAC	15	5	2	32	3rd	Won Quarterfinals vs. Princeton (2-1, 4-5 OT, 4-0); Lost Semifinals vs. Colgate (4-5)	—
2018–19	Doug Derraugh	24	6	6	ECAC	17	3	2	36	1st	Won Quarterfinals vs. RPI (2-1 OT, 0-2, 6-1); Won Semifinals vs. Princeton (3-2 2OT); Lost Championship vs. Clarkson (1-4)	Won Quarterfinals vs. Northeastern (3-2 OT); Lost Frozen Four vs. Minnesota (0-2)
2019–20	Doug Derraugh	28	2	3	ECAC	19	0	3	41	1st	Won Quarterfinals vs. St. Lawrence University (7-2, 3-2); Won Semifinals vs. Harvard (4-0); Lost Championship vs. Princeton (2-3) OT	Cancelled due to 2020 Coronavirus pandemic in the United States
2021-22	Doug Derraugh	14	14	2	ECAC	12	8	2	38	6th	Lost Quarterfinals vs. Colgate (0-1 OT, 3-2)	—
2022-23	Doug Derraugh	16	14	2	ECAC	12	9	1	39.5	5th	Lost Quarterfinals vs. Clarkson (1-5, 2-1 2 OT, 1-4)	—
2023-24	Doug Derraugh	25	8	1	ECAC	17	5	3	39.5	4th	Won Quarterfinals vs. Quinnipiac (3-2 OT, 5-0); Lost Semifinals vs. Cogate (1-5)	Won Regional Quarterfinal vs. Stonehill College (7-1 OT); Lost Regional Quarterfinal vs. Colgate (1-3)
2024-2025	Doug Derraugh	25	4	5	ECAC	16	2	4	54	1st	Won Quarterfinals vs. Union (3-0 OT, 3-2); Won Semifinals vs. Clarkson (2-1 OT); Won Championship vs. Colgate (6-1)	Won Quarterfinals vs. Minnesota-Duluth (1-0); Lost Semifinal vs. Ohio State (2-4)

Ivy League Champions: (18) 1976, 1977, 1978, 1979, 1980, 1981*, 1990, 1996, 2010, 2011, 2012, 2013*, 2017, 2018, 2020, 2024, 2025, 2026

* denotes shared title

=== Series records ===
School	Lead
Harvard Crimson	Harvard leads, 56–34–6
Dartmouth Big Green	Dartmouth leads, 42–40–7

== Roster ==
=== 2025–26 Big Red ===
As of October 29, 2025.

No.	Nat.	Player	Class	Pos	Height	DoB	Hometown	Previous team
1	(Canada)	Jeanne Lortie	Sophomore	G	5' 7" (1.7 m)	2004-04-02	Montreal, Quebec	Dawson College
2	(United States)	Georgia Schiff	Senior	F	5' 9" (1.75 m)	2004-03-27	Montpelier, Vermont	North American Hockey Academy
3	(Canada)	Piper Grober	Junior	D	5' 7" (1.7 m)	2005-08-03	Toronto, Ontario	Durham Lightning
4	(United States)	Grace Dwyer (C)	Senior	D	5' 8" (1.73 m)	2004-07-21	Wynnewood, Pennsylvania	USA U-18
5	(United States)	Lily Pachl	Freshman	D	5' 3" (1.6 m)	2007-08-28	Hudson, Wisconsin	South St. Paul High School
6	(Canada)	Alyssa Regalado	Senior	D	5' 7" (1.7 m)	2004-01-03	Mississauga, Ontario	Etobicoke Dolphins
7	(Canada)	Abby Thibodeau	Junior	D	5' 5" (1.65 m)	2004-05-12	Fonthill, Ontario	Burlington Barracudas
9	(United States)	Lindzi Avar	Sophomore	F	5' 10" (1.78 m)	2005-12-12	Chanhassen, Minnesota	USA U-18
10	(Canada)	Beatrice Perron-Roy	Junior	F	5' 5" (1.65 m)	2005-03-09	Sherbrooke, Quebec	Stanstead College
12	(Canada)	Riley Scorgie	Freshman	F	5' 6" (1.68 m)	2006-09-14	Edmonton, Alberta	Vimy Ridge Academy
13	(Canada)	Sarah MacEachern (C)	Senior	D	5' 8" (1.73 m)	2004-03-29	Canoe Cove, Prince Edward Island	Etobicoke Dolphins
15	(Canada)	Avi Adam	Senior	F	5' 9" (1.75 m)	2004-08-15	Wolfville, Nova Scotia	Etobicoke Dolphins
16	(United States)	Rose Dwyer	Sophomore	D	5' 10" (1.78 m)	2006-04-07	Wynnewood, Pennsylvania	USA U-18
17	(Canada)	Mckenna Van Gelder (C)	Senior	F	5' 7" (1.7 m)	2004-01-24	Etobicoke, Ontario	Etobicoke Dolphins
18	(United States)	Delaney Fleming	Junior	F	5' 4" (1.63 m)	2005-05-25	Rochester, Minnesota	Ohio State
19	(Canada)	Karel Prefontaine (A)	Junior	F	5' 4" (1.63 m)	2004-12-17	Gatineau, Quebec	Stanstead College
24	(United States)	Nora Curtis	Freshman	F	5' 10" (1.78 m)	2006-01-09	Skaneateles, New York	Williston Northampton School
31	(United States)	Liv Ferebee	Freshman	G	5' 5" (1.65 m)	2006-01-31	Lake Placid, New York	Williston Northampton School
43	(United States)	Annelies Bergmann	Junior	G	6' 1" (1.85 m)	2005-11-22	Detroit, Michigan	Oakland Grizzlies
47	(Canada)	Shannon Pearson	Freshman	F	5' 5" (1.65 m)	2007-03-27	Calgary, Alberta	Calgary Edge School
79	(Canada)	London McDavid	Freshman	F	5' 7" (1.7 m)	2007-03-29	Maple Ridge, British Columbia	North Delta Secondary School

== Notable players ==
- Rebecca Johnston
- Digit Murphy
- Johnston was the first Big Red player to be named first-team ECAC Hockey and receive rookie of the year honors. She has also been named first-team All-Ivy and Ivy League Rookie of the Year. In the 2008–09 season, Johnston's 37 point total (by mid-February) were the most points in a season for Cornell since the 1991–92 campaign (Kim Ratushny with 21 goals and 17 assists). Johnston's 37-point total in mid-February led the entire ECAC league in overall points. She was also second in the league and sixth in the NCAA in points per game with 1.85. In the 2008–09 season, Johnston's 37-point total were the most points in a season for Cornell since the 1991–92 campaign (Kim Ratushny with 21 goals and 17 assists).
- During the 2008–09 season, freshman Catherine White was second on the team in scoring (34 points). White has recorded the most points by a rookie since Dana Antal (36 points, 17 goals, 19 assists) in the 1995–96 season.
- Cyndy Schlaepfer holds the school record for points in a season with 89 during the 1976–77 season.
- Megan Shull joined the Big Red in 1987. Her on-ice career shortened by injury, Shull went on to become a children's book author. While earning her doctorate at Cornell, Shull created, The Cub Club, a mentoring program matching local girls' ice hockey players with members of the Cornell Big Red women's ice hockey team. The Cub Club still thrives today.

== Olympians ==
- Dana Antal, Team Canada 2002 Olympics - Gold Medal
- Rebecca Johnston, Team Canada 2010 Olympics and 2014 Olympics - Gold Medal, 2018 Olympics - Silver Medal
- Laura Fortino, Team Canada 2014 Olympics - Gold Medal, 2018 Olympics Silver Medal
- Brianne Jenner, Team Canada 2014 Olympics - Gold Medal, 2018 Olympics - Silver Medal
- Lauriane Rougeau, Team Canada 2014 Olympics - Gold Medal, 2018 Olympics- Silver Medal
- Jillian Saulnier, Team Canada 2018 Olympics - Silver Medal
- Former head coach Melody Davidson was head coach of Canada's gold medal winning women's Olympic hockey teams in 2006 and 2010.

== Awards and honors ==
- Dianna Bell, 2002 Sarah Devens Award
- Brooke Bestwick, Defense, 2002 ECAC North Second Team
- Lindsay Browning, 2019–20 Ivy League Player of the Year
- Izzy Daniel, 2019–20 Ivy League Rookie of the Year
- Izzy Daniel, 2023–24 Patty Kazmaier Award
- Devon Facchinato, 2021 ECAC Mandi Schwartz Student-Athlete of the Year
- Laura Fortino, Defense, Freshman, 2010 First Team All-Ivy
- Laura Fortino, 2010 ECAC All-Rookie Team
- Rebecca Johnston, Ivy League Rookie of the Year 2007–08, Cornell (Freshman), Unanimous selection
- Rebecca Johnston, First Team All-Ivy League, 2007–08, Forward, Cornell (Freshman)
- Rebecca Johnston, 2009 First Team All-ECAC
- Chelsea Karpenko, Forward, Sophomore, 2010 Second Team All-Ivy
- Chelsea Karpenko, 2011 ECAC Tournament Most Outstanding Player
- Amanda Mazzotta, ECAC Defensive Player of the Week (Week of November 2, 2009)
- Amanda Mazzotta, Goaltender, Sophomore, 2010 First Team All-Ivy
- Kristin O'Neill, 2018 Ivy League Player of the Year Award
- Kendice Ogilvie, 2010 ECAC Tournament Most Outstanding Player
- Lauriane Rougeau, Defense, Freshman, 2010 First Team All-Ivy
- Lauriane Rougeau, 2010 Ivy League Rookie of the Year
- Lauriane Rougeau, 2010 ECAC All-Rookie Team
- Jillian Saulnier, ECAC Rookie of the Month (Month of October 2011)
- Catherine White, 2009 ECAC Rookie of the Year
- Catherine White Cornell, 2009 Second Team All-ECAC
- Catherine White Cornell, 2009 ECAC All-Rookie Team
- Catherine White, 2010 ECAC Player of the Year award
- Catherine White, led the ECAC in assists in 2009–10 with 24
- Catherine White, 2010 Women's RBK Hockey Division I All-America Second Team
- Catherine White, Forward, Sophomore, 2010 First Team All-Ivy
- Catherine White, 2010 Ivy League Player of the Year
- Doug Derraugh, 2010 Coach of the Year
- Doug Derraugh, 2019 CCM/AHCA Women's National Collegiate Coach of the Year
- Doug Derraugh, 2020 CCM/AHCA Women's National Collegiate Coach of the Year

=== All-Americans ===
- Laura Fortino, 2010 Women's RBK Hockey Division I All-America First Team
- Laura Fortino, 2011 First Team All-America selection
- Rebecca Johnston, 2011 Second Team All-America selection
- Lauriane Rougeau, 2010 Women's RBK Hockey Division I All-America Second Team
- Lauriane Rougeau, 2011 Second Team All-America selection
- Laura Fortino, 2011–12 CCM Hockey Women's Division I All-American: First Team
- Rebecca Johnston, 2011–12 CCM Hockey Women's Division I All-American: First Team
- Lauriane Rougeau, 2011–12 CCM Hockey Women's Division I All-American: Second Team
- Jaime Bourbonnais, 2019-20 CCM Hockey Women's Division I All-American: First Team

Lindsay Browning, 2019-20 CCM Hockey Women's Division I All-American: Second Team

=== ECAC All-Decade Team ===
- Brianne Jenner, First Team All Star
- Jillian Saulnier
- Laura Fortino
- Lauriane Rougeau

=== All-ECAC Hockey honors ===
- Rebecca Johnston, 2011–12 ECAC Hockey Player of the Year
- Jillian Saulnier, 2011–12 ECAC Hockey Rookie of the Year
- Chelsea Karpenko, 2011–12 ECAC Hockey Best Defensive Forward
- Lauriane Rougeau, 2011–12 ECAC Hockey Best Defensive Defenseman
- Rebecca Johnston, 2011–12 All-ECAC Hockey First Team
- Brianne Jenner, 2011–12 All-ECAC Hockey First Team
- Lauriane Rougeau, 2011–12 All-ECAC Hockey First Team
- Laura Fortino, 2011–12 All-ECAC Hockey First Team
- Jillian Saulnier, 2011–12 All-ECAC Hockey Second Team
- Jillian Saulnier, 2011–12 All-ECAC Hockey Rookie Team
- Jaime Bourbonnais, 2019-2020 ECAC First Team
- Lindsay Browning, 2019-2020 ECAC First Team
- Kristin O’Neill, 2019-2020 ECAC Second Team
- Micah Zandee-Hart, 2019-2020 ECAC Second Team
- Maddie Mills, 2019-2020 ECAC Second Team

=== All-Ivy honors ===
- Laura Fortino, 2010–11 Ivy League Player of the Year
- Brianne Jenner, 2010–11 Ivy League Rookie of the Year
- Brianne Jenner, 2010–11 First Team All-Ivy
- Rebecca Johnston, 2010–11 First Team All-Ivy
- Chelsea Karpenko, 2010–11 First Team All-Ivy
- Laura Fortino, 2010–11 First Team All-Ivy
- Catherine White, 2010–11 Second Team All-Ivy
- Lauriane Rougeau, 2010–11 Second Team All-Ivy
- Rebecca Johnston, 2011–12 Ivy League Player of the Year
- Jillian Saulnier, 2011–12 Ivy League Rookie of the Year
- Rebecca Johnston, 2011–12 First Team All-Ivy
- Brianne Jenner, 2011–12 First Team All-Ivy
- Lauriane Rougeau, 2011–12 First Team All-Ivy
- Laura Fortino, 2011–12 First Team All-Ivy
- Amanda Mazzotta, 2011–12 Second Team All-Ivy
- Jillian Saulnier, 2011–12 Honorable Mention All-Ivy
- Catherine White, 2011–12 Honorable Mention All-Ivy
- Chelsea Karpenko, 2011–12 Honorable Mention All-Ivy
- Alyssa Gagliardi, 2011–12 Honorable Mention All-Ivy
- Kristin O'Neill, 2017-18 Ivy League Player of the Year
- Maddie Mills, 2017-18 Ivy League Rookie of the Year
- Doug Derraugh, 2017-18 Ivy League Coach of the Year
- Kristin O'Neill, 2017-18 First Team All-Ivy
- Maddie Mills, 2017-18 First Team All-Ivy
- Jaime Bourbonnais, 2017-18 First Team All-Ivy
- Marlène Boissonnault, 2017-18 First Team All-Ivy
- Lenka Serdar, 2017-18 Honorable Mention All-Ivy
- Jaime Bourbonnais, 2019-2020 Ivy League Player of the Year
- Izzy Daniel, 2019-2020 Rookie Player of the Year
- Jaime Bourbonnais, 2020 First Team All-Ivy
- Kristin O’Neill, 2020 First Team All-Ivy
- Micah Zandee-Hart, 2020 First Team All-Ivy
- Maddie Mills, 2020 Second Team All-Ivy
- Lindzi Avar, 2024–25 Ivy League Rookie of the Year
- Lindzi Avar, 2024–25 First Team All-Ivy
- Ashley Messier, 2024–25 First Team All-Ivy
- Rory Guilday, 2024–25 First Team All-Ivy
- Annelies Bergmann, 2024–25 First Team All-Ivy
- Alyssa Regalado, 2024–25 Second Team All-Ivy
- Grace Dwyer, 2025-26 First Team All-Ivy

== Big Red in professional hockey ==
= CWHL All-Star	= NWHL All-Star	= Clarkson Cup Champion	= Isobel Cup Champion

Player	Position	Team(s)	League(s)	Years	Clarkson Cup	Isobel Cup
Marlène Boissonnault	Goaltender	Montreal Victoire Minnesota Frost	PWHL	3		
Jaime Bourbonnais	Defense	New York Sirens	PWHL	3		
Hanna Bunton	Forward	Shenzhen KRS Vanke Rays; Dream Gap Tour	CWHL; PWHPA			
Jessica Campbell	Forward	Calgary Inferno	CWHL		1 (2016)	
Hayleigh Cudmore	Defense	Calgary Inferno	CWHL	4	1 (2016)	
Amy Curlew	Forward	Toronto Six	NWHL			
Izzy Daniel	Forward	Toronto Sceptres Vancouver Goldeneyes	PWHL			
Lily Delianedias	Forward	Seattle Torrent	PWHL			
Laura Fortino	Defense	Markham Thunder	CWHL		1 (2018)	
Alyssa Gagliardi	Defense	Boston Blades; Boston Pride; Dream Gap Tour	CWHL; NWHL; PWHPA		1 (2015)	1 (2016)
Rory Guilday	Defense	Ottawa Charge	PWHL	1		
Brianne Jenner	Forward	Calgary Inferno; Dream Gap Tour Ottawa Charge	CWHL; PWHPA PWHL		2 (2016 and 2019)	
Rebecca Johnston	Forward	Toronto Furies; Calgary Inferno; Dream Gap Tour	CWHL; PWHPA		2 (2016 and 2019)	
Kelly Murray	Defense	Calgary Inferno	CWHL		1 (2019)	
Kristin O'Neill	Forward	Montreal Victoire New York Sirens	PWHL	3		
Cassandra Poudrier	Defense	Canadiennes de Montreal	CWHL		1 (2017)	
Lauriane Rougeau	Defense	Canadiennes de Montreal Toronto Sceptres	CWHL PWHL			
Jillian Saulnier	Forward	Calgary Inferno; Canadiennes de Montreal; Dream Gap Tour New York Sirens Boston Fleet	CWHL; PWHPA PWHL		2 (2016 and 2019)	
Catherine White	Forward	Toronto Furies	CWHL	2		
Taylor Woods	Defense	Markham Thunder; Dream Gap Tour; Toronto Six	CWHL; PWHPA; NWHL		1 (2018)	
Micah Zandee-Hart	Defense	New York Sirens	PWHL	3		

== See also ==
- Cornell Big Red men's ice hockey
