= Princeton Tigers women's ice hockey =

- Current season
- University: Princeton University
- Conference: ECAC
- Head coach: Courtney Birchard-Kessel
- Arena: Hobey Baker Memorial Rink; Princeton, New Jersey
- Colors: Black and orange

NCAA tournament appearances
- 2006, 2016, 2019, 2026

Conference tournament champions
- 2020

Conference regular season champions
- 2026

The Princeton Tigers women's college ice hockey team represents Princeton University in the ECAC Hockey conference in the NCAA Division I women's ice hockey. They play at the Hobey Baker Memorial Rink. In the 2019–2020 season, they won their first ECAC championship, defeating #1 ranked Cornell by a score of 3–2 in overtime. They have reached the NCAA Tournament four times, the most for a team to never reach the Frozen Four.

== History ==
On November 24, 1979, the Princeton Tigers played their first varsity game against the University of Pennsylvania. In winter of 1982, Princeton would snap the Cornell Big Red women's ice hockey program's string of six straight Ivy League titles and go on to win Ivy League championships in 1983 and 1984 under head coach Bill Quackenbush.

Former Princeton player and assistant coach Laura Halldorson would coach the Minnesota Golden Gophers women's ice hockey program to the 2004 NCAA title.

On February 26, 2010, Princeton would be part of NCAA ice hockey history. With a 5–1 loss to the Harvard Crimson women's ice hockey program, Harvard coach Katey Stone became women's college hockey's all-time winningest coach, surpassing former Princeton player and Minnesota head coach Laura Halldorson.

On December 31, 2010, Rachel Weber made 24 saves as the Tigers upset the fifth ranked Boston College Eagles by a 3–0 margin. It was Weber's third shutout in four games and her goals against average for the season was lowered to 1.93 In three games played between January 3 and 8, 2011, Rachel Weber earned three victories and allowed only one goal. On January 3, she defeated Quinnipiac by a 3–0 tally and shutout Clarkson by a 2–0 score on January 7. The following day, she gave up her only goal of the week in a 3–1 win over St. Lawrence. Her shutout streak spanned six games and lasted 289:43. She is now the owner of the longest shutout streak in ECAC history and the fourth longest in NCAA Division I since the 2000–01 season.

2019–2020 was a historic season for the Tigers. The team finished with a program-best 26 wins. Ranked 6th and seeded second, they played in and won the ECAC championship tournament for the first time. Carly Bullock scored 30 goals, only the fifth player in program history to accomplish the feat. She was named the national Player of the Month in February 2020 for scoring 13 goals in 9 games. Her 30th goal came in the ECAC championship game against Cornell, when she evened the score at 2–2. The Tigers would go on to win in overtime, 3–2, with Mariah Keopple scoring the winning goal, from assists by Shannon Griffin and Sharon Frankel. Forward Sarah Fillier was selected as ECAC tournament Most Outstanding Player, after earning points in every game. The Tigers arrived in the championship game after beating Clarkson by a score of 5–1. The Tigers were scheduled to play Northeastern in the quarterfinals for the NCAA tournament when the event was canceled due to the COVID-19 pandemic.

Additionally, the impact of the pandemic would wipe out the 2020–21 season for all Ivy League teams. Although the ECAC Conference, the member conference for Ivy League women's ice hockey teams, held a season in 2020–21, Princeton, and all other Ivy League teams did not participate.

In 2024, team captain Sarah Fillier was selected first overall by the New York Sirens in the 2024 PWHL Draft. As of 2025, a total of five alumnae and one former coach have played in the PWHL.

=== Year by year ===
Won championship	Lost championship	Conference champions	League leader

Year	Coach	W	L	T	Conference	Conf. W	Conf. L	Conf. T	Finish	Conference Tournament	NCAA Tournament
2024–25	Cara Morey	18	12	2	ECAC	11	9	2	7th ECAC	Lost Quarterfinals vs. Colgate (2–5,1–2)	Did not qualify
2023–24	Cara Morey	14	12	6	ECAC	6	10	6	7th ECAC	Lost Quarterfinals vs. Clarkson (2–3,3–6)	Did not qualify
2022–23	Cara Morey	15	15	1	ECAC	10	12	0	7th ECAC	Lost Quarterfinals vs. Colgate (3–2, 3–4, 1–2)	Did not qualify
2021–22	Cara Morey	13	15	5	ECAC	9	10	3	8th ECAC	Won Quarterfinals vs. Harvard (4–2, 1–2 OT, 3–2); Lost Semifinals vs. Yale (1–3)	Did not qualify
2019–20	Cara Morey	26	6	1	ECAC	17	4	1	2nd ECAC	Won Quarterfinals vs. Quinipiac (5–1, 2–3 OT, 3–2 2OT); Won Semifinals vs. Clarkson (5–1); Won Championship vs. Cornell (3–2 OT)	Cancelled
2018–19	Cara Morey	20	8	5	ECAC	15	4	3	4th ECAC	Won Quarterfinals vs. St. Lawrence (4–1, 6–2); Lost Semifinals vs. Cornell (2–3 OT)	Lost Quarterfinals vs. Minnesota (2–5)
2017–18	Cara Morey	14	14	4	ECAC	11	10	1	6th ECAC	Lost Quarterfinals vs. Cornell (1–2, 5–4)	Did not qualify
2016–17	Jeff Kampersal	20	10	3	ECAC	14	6	2	4th ECAC	Won Quarterfinals vs. Quinnipiac (2–33OT, 2–0, 2–1 )Lost Semifinal vs. Clarkson (0–4)	Did not qualify
2015–16	Jeff Kampersal	22	9	2	ECAC	14	6	2	3rd ECAC	Lost Quarterfinals vs. St. Lawrence (0–1, 4–3, 3–4 OT)	Lost First Round vs. Minnesota (2–6)
2014–15	Jeff Kampersal	15	14	2	ECAC	13	8	1	6th ECAC	Lost Quarterfinals vs. Quinnipiac (0–7, 0–2)	Did not qualify
2013–14	Jeff Kampersal	14	13	4	ECAC	10	9	3	6th ECAC	Lost Quarterfinals vs. Cornell (2–3, 3–5)	Did not qualify
2012–13	Jeff Kampersal	11	16	2	ECAC	6	14	2	9th ECAC	Did not qualify	Did not qualify
2011–12	Jeff Kampersal	12	15	4	ECAC	10	10	2	7th ECAC	Lost Quarterfinals vs. Harvard (3–5, 3–4 OT)	Did not qualify
2010–11	Jeff Kampersal	16	14	1	ECAC	13	8	1	4th ECAC	Lost Quarterfinals vs. Quinnipiac (1–2, 0–2)	Did not qualify
2009–10	Jeff Kampersal	13	14	4	ECAC	11	7	4	5th ECAC	Lost Quarterfinals vs. Harvard (1–5, 1–4)	Did not qualify
2008–09	Jeff Kampersal	18	11	2	ECAC	15	6	1	3rd ECAC	Lost Quarterfinals vs. RPI (1–2 OT, 0–1)	Did not qualify
2007–08	Jeff Kampersal	14	12	6	ECAC	11	8	3	5th ECAC	Lost Quarterfinals vs. Clarkson (1–0, 2–3 OT 1–2)	Did not qualify
2006–07	Jeff Kampersal	16	12	3	ECAC	14	6	2	4th ECAC	Lost Quarterfinals vs. Colgate (0–1 OT, 2–3)	Did not qualify
2005–06	Jeff Kampersal	21	8	4	ECAC	15	3	2	2nd ECAC	Won Quarterfinals vs. Colgate (3–0, 5–4); Lost Semifinals vs. Brown (0–1)	Lost First Round vs. Minnesota (0–4)
2004–05	Jeff Kampersal	16	10	5	ECAC	10	7	3	6th ECAC	Lost Quarterfinals vs. Yale (3–4 OT, 2–4)	Did not qualify
2003–04	Jeff Kampersal	20	11	0	ECAC	12	6	0	5th ECAC	Lost Quarterfinals vs. Brown (1–2, 2–3 OT)	Did not qualify
2002–03	Jeff Kampersal	20	9	2	ECAC	11	5	0	3rd ECAC	Won Quarterfinals vs. Yale (6–2, 8–0); Lost Semifinals vs. Dartmouth (2–4)	Did not qualify
2001–02	Jeff Kampersal	15	11	3	ECAC	10	6	0	5th ECAC	Lost Quarterfinals vs. Harvard (2–3, 1–3)	Did not qualify
2000–01	Jeff Kampersal	13	13	3	ECAC	8	13	3	10th ECAC	Did not qualify	Did not qualify
1999–2000	Jeff Kampersal	11	13	5	ECAC	9	12	3	9th ECAC	Did not qualify	Did not qualify
1998–1999	Jeff Kampersal	14	14	1	ECAC	14	11	1	7th ECAC	Lost Quarterfinals vs. New Hampshire (1–5)	Did not qualify

== Current roster ==
As of September 7, 2022.

No.	Nat.	Player	Class	Pos	Height	DoB	Hometown	Previous team
2		Mariah Keopple (C)	Senior	D	5' 9" (1.75 m)	2000-06-27	Menomonie, Wisconsin	Hill-Murray School
3		Kate Monihan	Junior	D	5' 5" (1.65 m)	2001-08-18	Moorestown, New Jersey	Lawrenceville School
4		Mia Coene	Sophomore	F	5' 5" (1.65 m)	2002-02-28	Clayton, New York	Bishop Kearney Selects
5		Emma Dornseif	Sophomore	D	5' 7" (1.7 m)	2001-10-17	Oakdale, Minnesota	Mahtomedi High School
7		Stef Wallace	Junior	D	5' 10" (1.78 m)	2001-03-18	Vancouver, British Columbia	Oakville Jr. Hornets
8		Chloe Harvey	Senior	D	5' 5" (1.65 m)	2000-01-01	Fairport, New York	Bishop Kearney Selects
9		Annie Kuehl	Junior	F	5' 7" (1.7 m)	2001-08-11	Minneapolis, Minnesota	Edina High School
10		Emerson O'Leary	Freshman	F	5' 7" (1.7 m)	2004-01-16	Southborough, Massachusetts	Noble and Greenough School
11		Jane Kuehl	Freshman	F	5' 6" (1.68 m)	2003-10-18	Minneapolis, Minnesota	Edina High School
13		Grace Kuipers	Sophomore	F	5' 5" (1.65 m)	2003-05-09	Eden Prairie, Minnesota	Eden Prairie High School
15		Catherine Kerin	Junior	F	5' 5" (1.65 m)	2001-06-15	Edina, Minnesota	St. Paul United
16		Sarah Fillier (C)	Junior	F	5' 5" (1.65 m)	2000-06-09	Georgetown, Ontario	Oakville Jr. Hornets
17		Daniella Calabrese	Junior	F	5' 6" (1.68 m)	2001-10-17	Brooklin, Ontario	Durham West Jr. Lightning
18		Issy Wunder	Freshman	F	5' 11" (1.8 m)	2003-12-15	Toronto, Ontario	Durham West Jr. Lightning
19		Sarah Paul	Sophomore	F	5' 8" (1.73 m)	2003-07-20	West Kelowna, British Columbia	Rink Hockey Academy Kelowna
20		Katherine Khramtsov	Freshman	F	5' 5" (1.65 m)	2004-04-17	Kensington, Maryland	Philadelphia Jr. Flyers
21		Emma Kee	Junior	F	5' 2" (1.57 m)	2000-09-14	McLean, Virginia	Shattuck-Saint Mary's
22		Maggie Connors (C)	Senior	F	5' 6" (1.68 m)	2000-10-22	St. John's, Newfoundland and Labrador	Shattuck-Saint Mary's
23		Ellie Marcovsky	Sophomore	F	5' 3" (1.6 m)	2002-01-21	Pittsburgh, Pennsylvania	Robert Morris
24		Kayla Fillier	Senior	F	5' 6" (1.68 m)	2000-06-09	Georgetown, Ontario	Oakville Jr. Hornets
25		Dominique Cormier	Sophomore	D	5' 7" (1.7 m)	2003-10-11	Sainte-Marie-de-Kent, New Brunswick	Stanstead College
27		Solveig Neunzert	Senior	D	5' 9" (1.75 m)	1999-11-14	Passau, Germany	ERC Ingolstadt
29		Taylor Hyland	Freshman	G	5' 8" (1.73 m)	2002-12-04	Wellesley, Massachusetts	Loomis Chaffee School
30		Cassie Reale	Senior	G	5' 9" (1.75 m)	2000-07-18	Toronto, Ontario	Mississauga Jr. Chiefs
35		Jennifer Olnowich	Sophomore	G	5' 5" (1.65 m)	2002-03-09	Madison, New Jersey	Jersey Penguins

== Notable players ==
- Patty Kazmaier
- Denna Laing
- Kelsey Koelzer
- Sarah Fillier
- Claire Thompson

== Awards and honors ==
- Amy Bourbeau, 2011 AHCA Assistant Coach Award (inaugural winner)
- Carly Bullock, Women's Hockey Commissioners Association Player of the Month February 2020
- Maggie Connors: Women’s Hockey Commissioners Association Rookie of the Month – February 2019
- Danielle DiCesare, Forward, Sophomore, 2010 Honorable Mention All-Ivy
- Sarah Fillier, 2019–20 CCM Hockey Women's Division I All-American: Second Team
- Sarah Fillier, 2018–19 Women's Hockey Commissioners Association National Rookie of the Year
- Patty Kazmaier, All-Ivy League Honorable Mention honors as a freshman
- Patty Kazmaier, All-Ivy League Second Team in her sophomore and junior seasons
- Patty Kazmaier, All-Ivy League First Team and All-Eastern College Athletic Conference First Team as a senior
- Patty Kazmaier, Ivy League Most Valuable Player (1986)
- Mollie Marcoux, four-time All-Ivy (1988, 1989, 1990, 1991)
- Marykate Oakley, Second Team All-Ivy League, 2007–08
- Paula Romanchuk, Forward, Sophomore, 2010 Honorable Mention All-Ivy
- Sasha Sherry, Second Team All-ECAC, 2010–11
- Rachel Weber, Second Team All-ECAC, 2010–11
- Issy Wunder, 2025–26 Mandi Schwartz Scholar Athlete of the Year Award
- Issy Wunder, 2024–25 and 2025-26 Ivy League Player of the Year

=== All-Ivy honors ===
- Sasha Sherry, 2010–11 Second Team All-Ivy
- Rachel Weber, 2010–11 Second Team All-Ivy
- Kristen Young, Honorable Mention All-Ivy League, 2007–08, Goaltender, Princeton (Junior)
- Kristen Young, Second Team All-Ivy, 2008–09, Goaltender, Princeton (Senior)
- Carly Bullock, 2017–18 First Team All-Ivy
- Karlie Lund, 2017–18 Second Team All-Ivy
- Claire Thompson, 2017–18 Second Team All-Ivy
- Stephanie Sucharda, 2017–18 Second Team All-Ivy
- Stephanie Neatby, 2017–18 Second Team All-Ivy
- Mariah Keopple, 2021–22 Second Team All-Ivy
- Issy Wunder, 2024–25 First Team All-Ivy
- Sarah Paul, 2024–25 Second Team All-Ivy
- Mackenzie Alexander, 2024–25 Second Team All-Ivy
- Uma Cornelia, 2025-26 First Team All-Ivy
- Issy Wunder 2025-26 First Team All-Ivy
- Mackenzie Alexander 2025-26 Second Team All-Ivy
- Rosie Klein 2025-26 Honorable Mention All-Ivy

=== ECAC honors ===
- Gretchen Anderson, Forward, 2002 All-ECAC North Honorable Mention
- Katherine Dineen, First Team All-Ivy League, 2007–08, Defenseman, Princeton (Junior)
- Katherine Dineen, Defense, 2009 First Team All-ECAC
- Katherine Dineen, 2009 ECAC Best Defenseman
- Aviva Grumet-Morris, Defense, 2002 ECAC North First Team
- Jeff Kampersal: 2002 ECAC North Coach of the Year
- Jeff Kampersal, 2009 ECAC Coach of the Year
- Katharine Maglione, Defense, 2002 ECAC North All-Rookie Team
- Mollie Marcoux, All ECAC in 1991
- Mollie Marcoux, All-ECAC team of the decade (1990 ‘s)
- Mollie Marcoux, Ivy League's Silver Anniversary ice hockey team (selected in 1999).
- Sasha Sherry, First Team All-Ivy League, 2007–08, Defenseman, Princeton (Freshman)
- Sasha Sherry Defense, 2009 First Team All-ECAC
- Sasha Sherry, Defense, Junior, 2010 Second Team All-Ivy

=== Princeton's Patty Kazmaier Award ===
Of note, the Tigers also have their own Patty Kazmaier Award. Unlike the NCAA award, this award is given annually to a senior member of the women's hockey team. The criteria include making the greatest contribution to the program during her career and best exemplifying characteristics such as: loyalty and devotion to Princeton Women's Hockey and determination and perseverance under adverse conditions.

Year	Winner
2025	Mia Coene
2024	Sarah Fillier
2023	Maggie Connors
2022	Sharon Frankel
2021	Not Awarded
2020	Claire Thompson
2019	Stephanie Sucharda
2018	Kiersten Falck
2017	Fiona McKenna
2016	Karen MacDonald
2015	Alison Pankowski
2014	Denna Laing; Gabie Figueroa
2013	Corey Stearnes
2012	Paula Romanchuk
2011	Laura Martindale; Sasha Sheery
2010	Stephanie Denino
2009	Kristen Young
2008	Elizabeth Keady
2007	Kimberly Pearce
2006	Heather Jackson
2005	Katharine Maglione; Rebecca Stewart
2004	Lisa Rasmussen
2003	Andrea Kilbourne
2002	Aviva Grumet-Morris
2001	Abbey Fox; Lauren Hayes
2000	Danielle Holtschlag
1999	Elizabeth Shea
1998	Tamara Orlow
1997	Karen Chernisky; Amanda Pfeiffer
1996	Elizabeth Hill
1995	Katherine Issel
1994	Whitney Rogers
1993	Ella Griffith
1992	Christine Pillsbury
1991	Mollie Marcoux
1990	Eleanor Tydings

== Tigers in professional hockey ==
= CWHL All-Star	= NWHL All-Star	= Clarkson Cup Champion	= Isobel Cup Champion	= Walter Cup Champion

Player	Position	Team(s)	League(s)	Years	Clarkson Cup	Isobel Cup
Maggie Connors	Forward	Toronto Sceptres; PWHL San Jose	PWHL	3		
Kelly Cooke	Defense	Boston Blades; Boston Pride	CWHL; NWHL		1 (2015)	1 (2016)
Stephanie Denino	Defense	Montreal Stars	CWHL		1 (2012)	
Gabie Figueroa	Defense	Metropolitan Riveters	NWHL	2		
Sarah Fillier	Forward	New York Sirens	PWHL	2		
Mariah Keopple	Defense	Montreal Victoire; Seattle Torrent; PWHL San Jose	PWHL	3		
Kelsey Koelzer	Defense	Metropolitan Riveters; Dream Gap Tour	NWHL; PWHPA first pick in 2016 NWHL Draft	4		1 (2018)
Denna Laing	Defense	Boston Blades; Boston Pride	CWHL; NWHL	2	1 (2015)	1 (2016)
Kimberly Newell	Goaltender	KRS Vanke Rays	CWHL; ZhHL			
Ali Pankowski	Forward	HC Université Neuchâtel	SWHL A	1		
Claire Thompson	Defense	Minnesota Frost; Vancouver Goldeneyes	PWHL	2		
Megan Van Beusekom-Sweerin	Goaltender	Minnesota Whitecaps	WWHL		1 (2010)	

== See also ==
- Princeton Tigers men's ice hockey
- Princeton Tigers
