= Western Collegiate Hockey Association women's individual awards =

The Western Collegiate Hockey Association gives awards at the conclusion of each season. The current awards include Player of the Year, Outstanding Student-Athlete of the Year, Defensive Player of the Year, Rookie of the Year, and Coach of the Year, as well as the league leaders in points scoring and goaltending. In addition, several WCHA players have won the Patty Kazmaier Award for the nation's best women's college hockey player.

Past winners have included numerous Olympic medalists and players in professional hockey leagues in North America and Europe. Minnesota is the most successful team, with 60 award winners and statistical leaders. All current members of the conference are represented.

Hannah Brandt of Minnesota won five awards over her career; she was named Rookie of the Year, led the league in scoring twice, and was named Player of the Year twice. Seven other players have won three or more awards over their careers. No player has won more than two awards in a single season; eleven players have achieved this feat. Mark Johnson of Wisconsin has been named Coach of the Year nine times.

== Patty Kazmaier Award ==
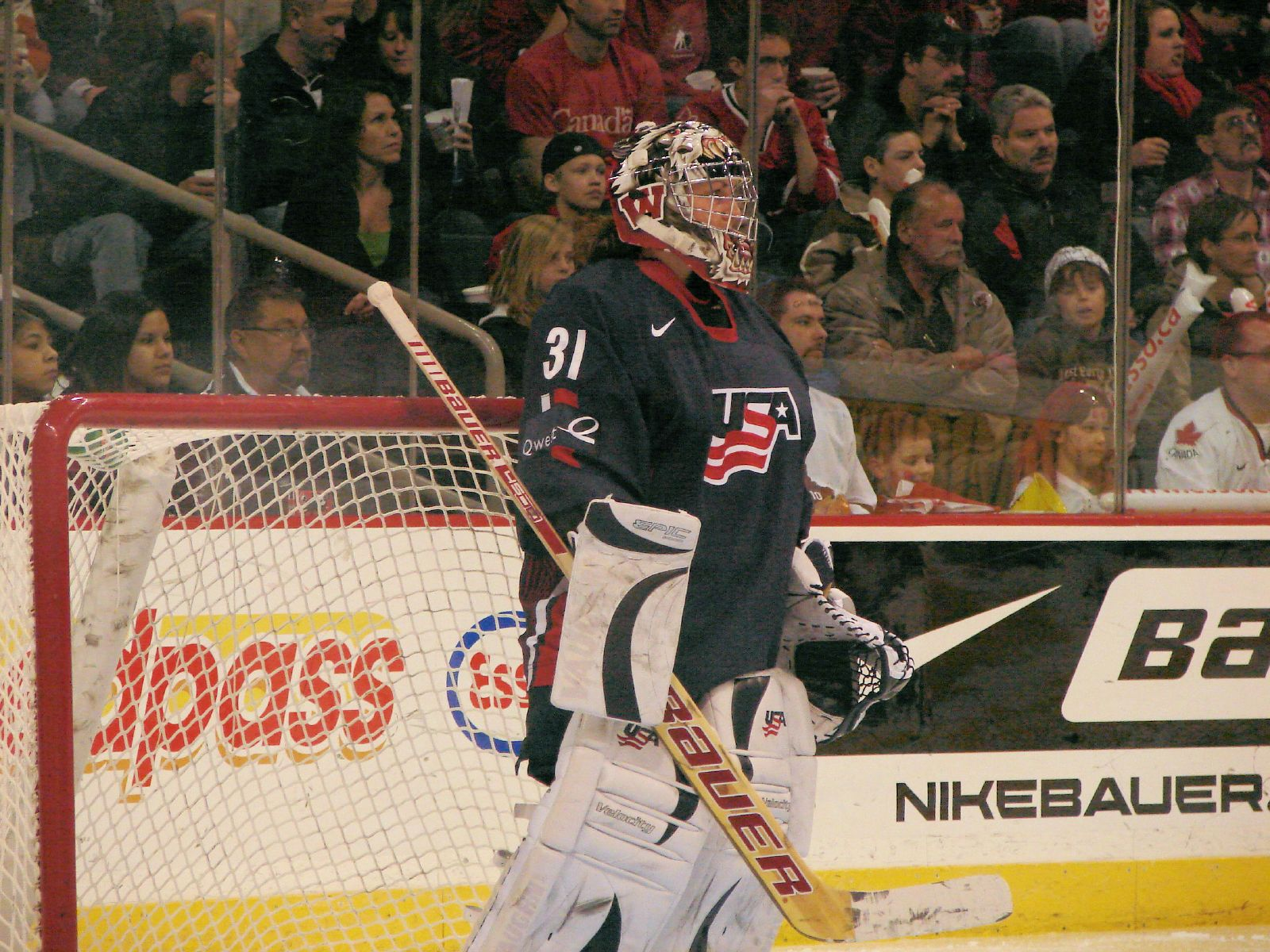
Jessie Vetter, 2009 Patty Kazmaier Award winner

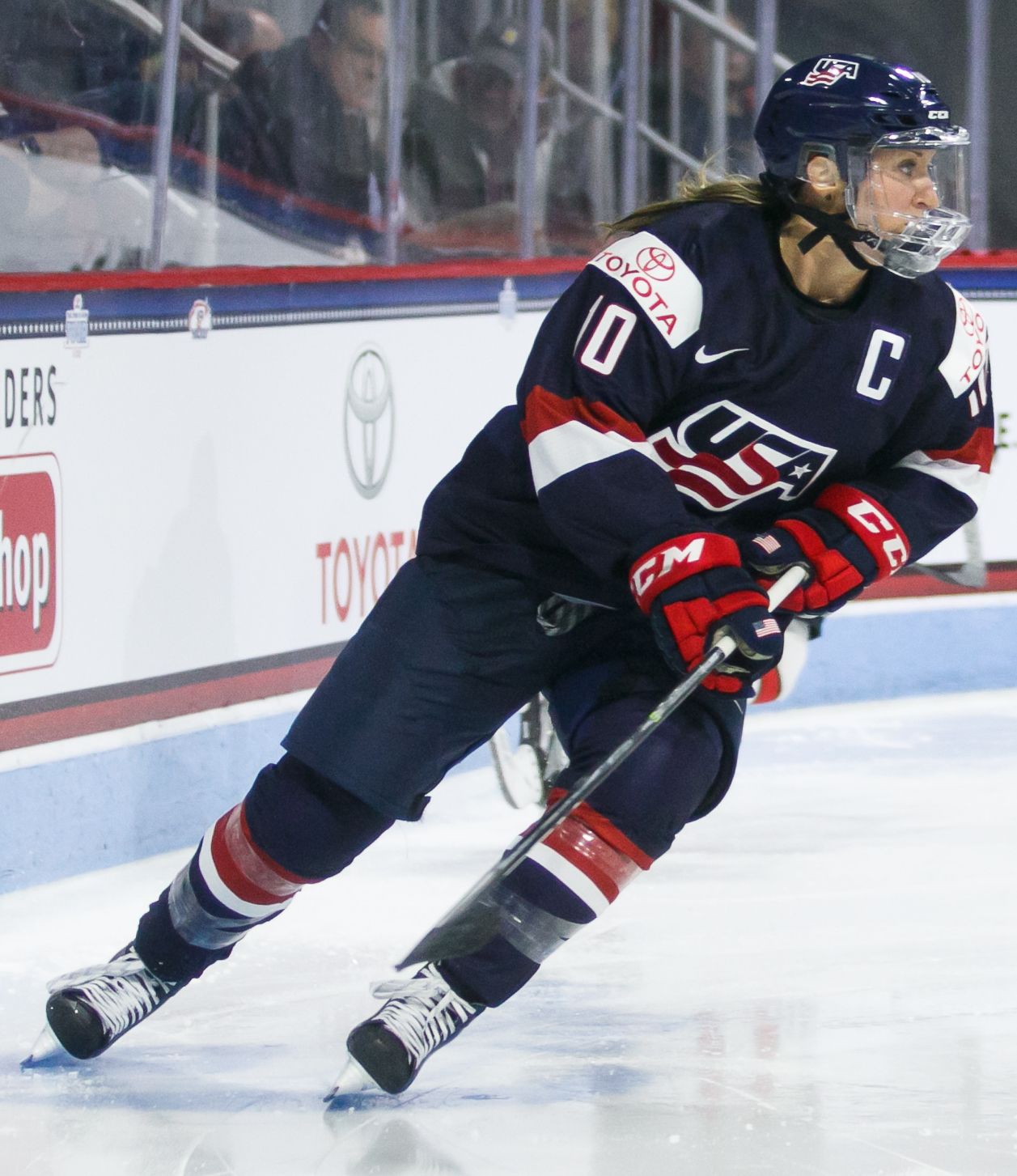
Meghan Duggan, 2011 Patty Kazmaier Award winner

The Patty Kazmaier Award has been awarded annually since 1998 to the top player in NCAA Division I women's hockey. In that time, 11 players have won the award while playing for WCHA schools.

Year	Player	Position	School
2005	Krissy Wendell	Forward	Minnesota
2006	Sara Bauer	Forward	Wisconsin
2009	Jessie Vetter	Goaltender	Wisconsin
2011	Meghan Duggan	Forward	Wisconsin
2012	Brianna Decker	Forward	Wisconsin
2013	Amanda Kessel	Forward	Minnesota
2017	Ann-Renée Desbiens	Goaltender	Wisconsin
2022	Taylor Heise	Forward	Minnesota
2023	Sophie Jaques	Defense	Ohio State
2025	Casey O'Brien	Forward	Wisconsin
2026	Caroline Harvey	Defense	Wisconsin

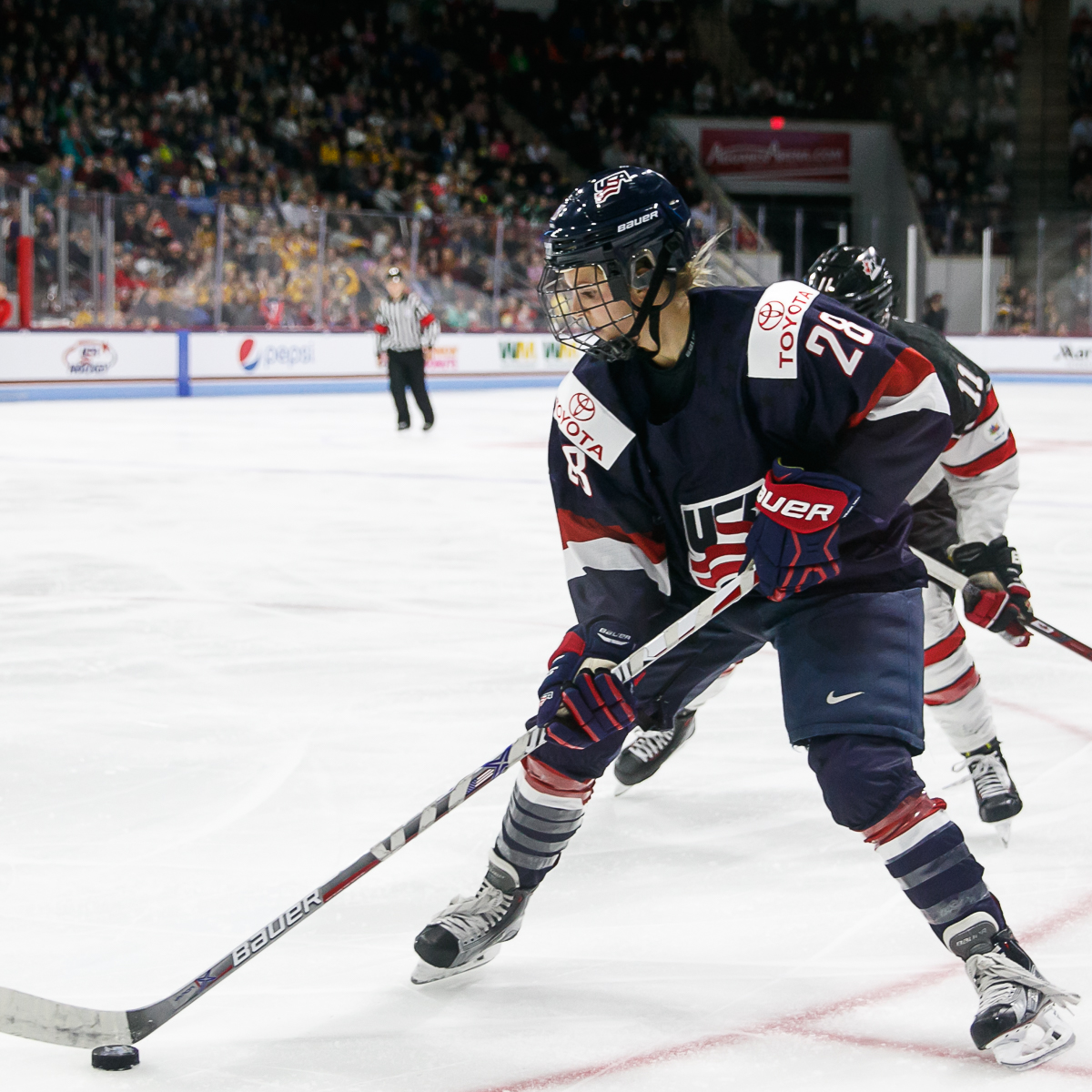
Amanda Kessel, 2013 Patty Kazmaier Award winner

=== Winners by school ===
School	Winners	Years
Wisconsin	7	2006, 2009, 2011, 2012, 2017, 2025, 2026
Minnesota	3	2005, 2013, 2022
Ohio State	1	2023

== Player of the Year ==
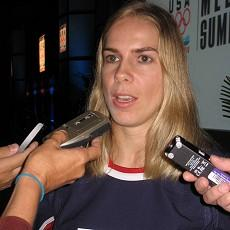
Jenny Schmidgall-Potter, 1999–2000 and 2002–03 Player of the Year

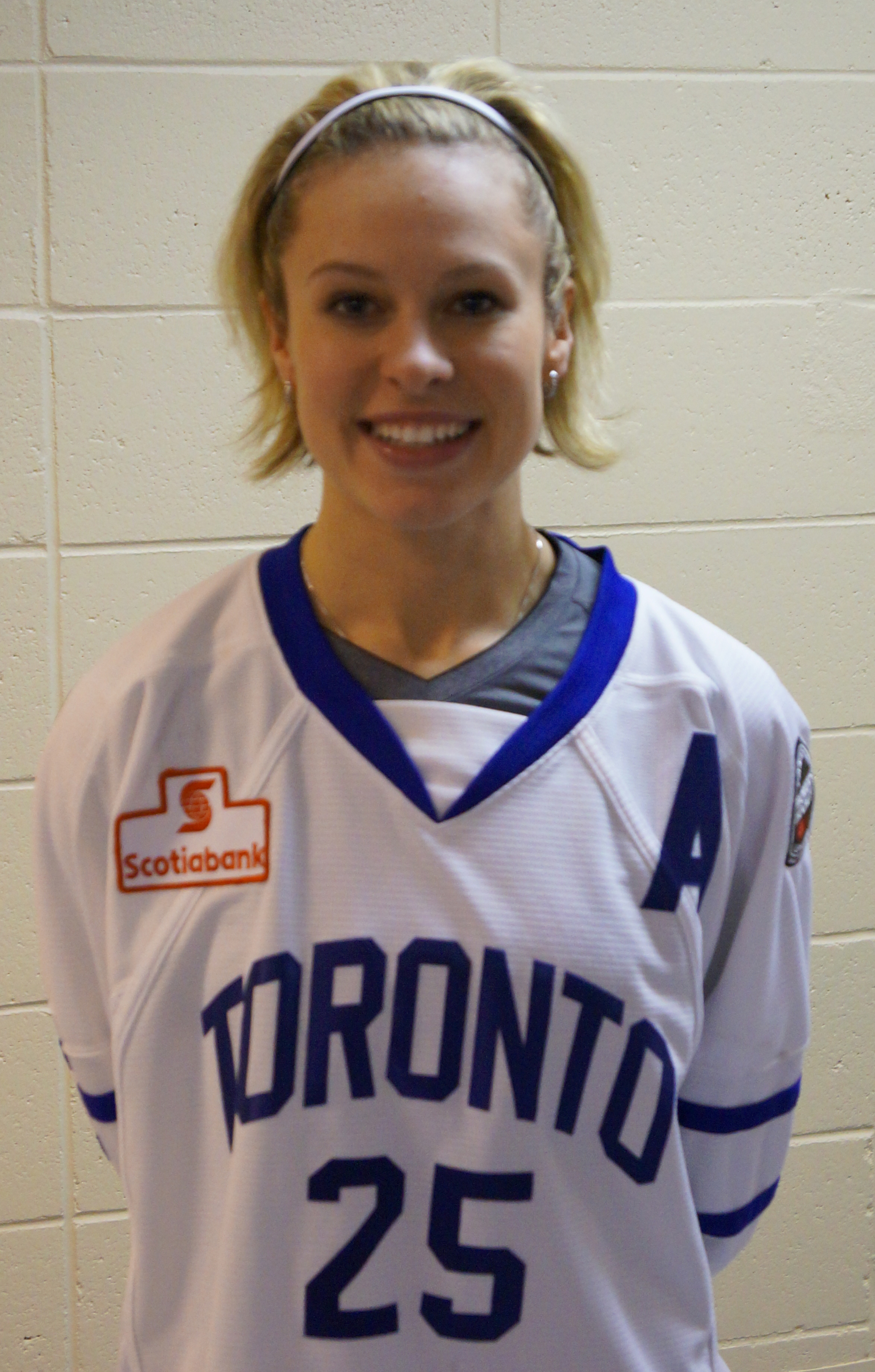
Tessa Bonhomme, 2007–08 Player of the Year

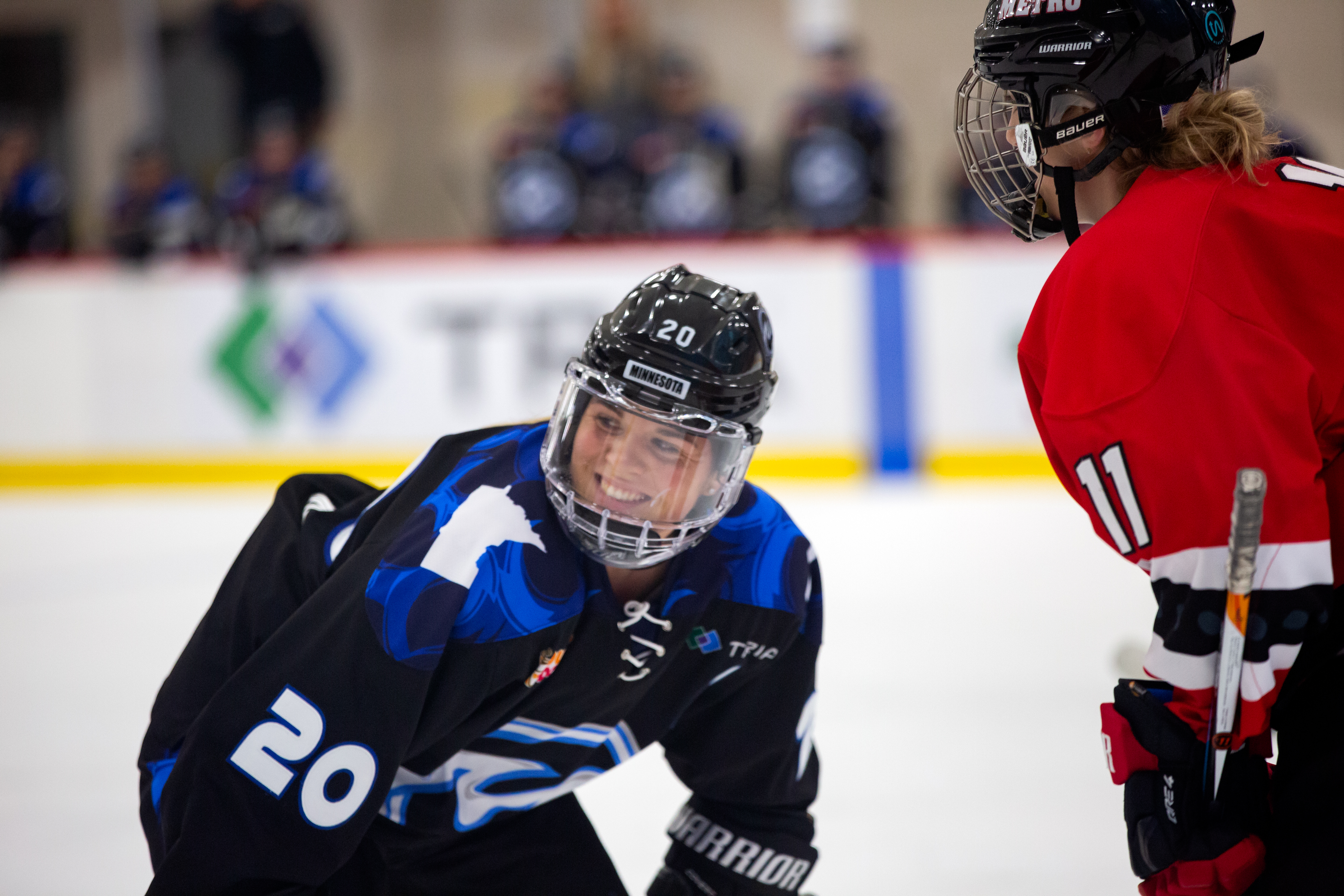
Hannah Brandt, 2013–14 and 2014–15 Player of the Year

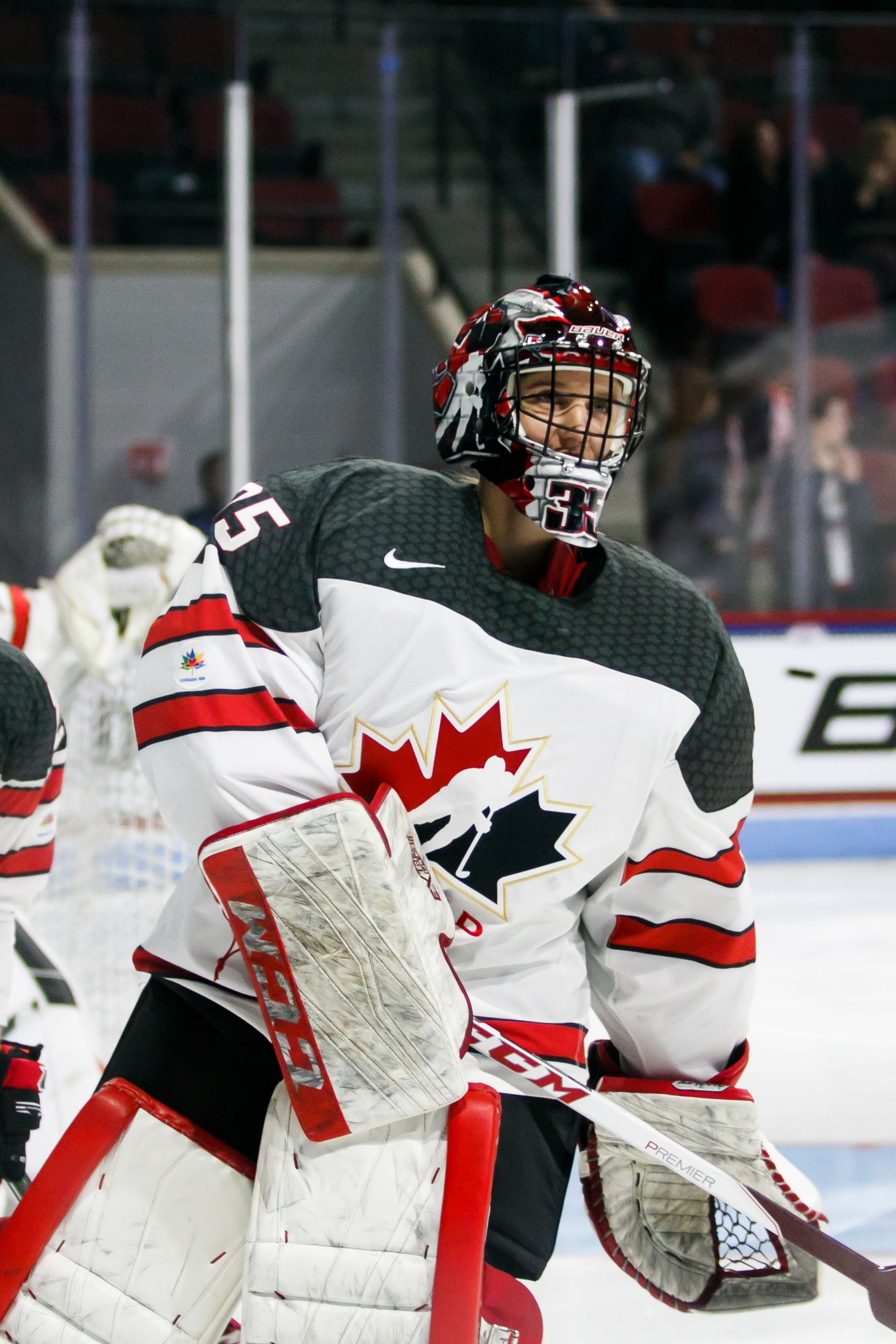
Ann-Renée Desbiens, 2015–16 Player of the Year

Season	Player	Pos.	School
1999–2000	Jenny Schmidgall-Potter	Forward	Minnesota–Duluth
2000–01	Courtney Kennedy	Defense	Minnesota
2001–02	Ronda Curtin	Defense	Minnesota
2002–03	Jenny Schmidgall-Potter (2)	Forward	Minnesota–Duluth
2003–04	Krissy Wendell	Forward	Minnesota
2004–05	Krissy Wendell (2)	Forward	Minnesota
2005–06	Sara Bauer	Forward	Wisconsin
2006–07	Sara Bauer (2)	Forward	Wisconsin
2007–08	Tessa Bonhomme	Defense	Ohio State
2008–09	Hilary Knight	Forward	Wisconsin
2009–10^{†}	Felicia Nelson	Forward	St. Cloud State
2009–10^{†}	Zuzana Tomčíková	Goaltender	Bemidji State
2010–11	Meghan Duggan	Forward	Wisconsin
2011–12	Brianna Decker	Forward	Wisconsin
2012–13	Amanda Kessel	Forward	Minnesota
2013–14	Hannah Brandt	Forward	Minnesota
2014–15	Hannah Brandt (2)	Forward	Minnesota
2015–16	Ann-Renée Desbiens	Goaltender	Wisconsin
2016–17	Lara Stalder	Forward	Minnesota–Duluth
2017–18	Sydney Baldwin	Defense	Minnesota
2018–19	Annie Pankowski	Forward	Wisconsin
2019–20	Abby Roque	Forward	Wisconsin
2020–21	Daryl Watts	Forward	Wisconsin
2021–22	Taylor Heise	Forward	Minnesota
2022–23	Sophie Jaques	Defense	Ohio State
2023–24	Kirsten Simms	Forward	Wisconsin
2024–25	Casey O'Brien	Forward	Wisconsin
2025–26	Caroline Harvey	Defense	Wisconsin

=== Winners by school ===
School	Winners	Years
Wisconsin	12	2005–06, 2006–07, 2008–09, 2010–11, 2011–12, 2015–16, 2018–19, 2019–20, 2020–21, 2023–24, 2024–25, 2025–26
Minnesota	9	2000–01, 2001–02, 2003–04, 2004–05, 2012–13, 2013–14, 2014–15, 2017–18, 2021–22
Minnesota–Duluth	3	1999–2000, 2002–03, 2016–17
Ohio State	2	2007–08, 2022–23
Bemidji State	1	2009–10^{†}
St. Cloud State	1	2009–10^{†}

== Student-Athlete of the Year ==
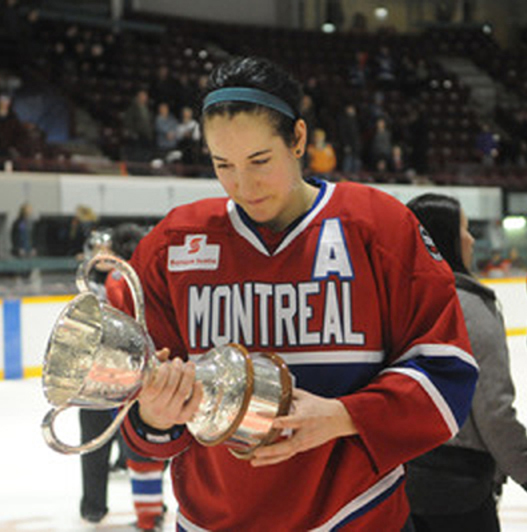
Caroline Ouellette, 2004–05 Student-Athlete of the Year

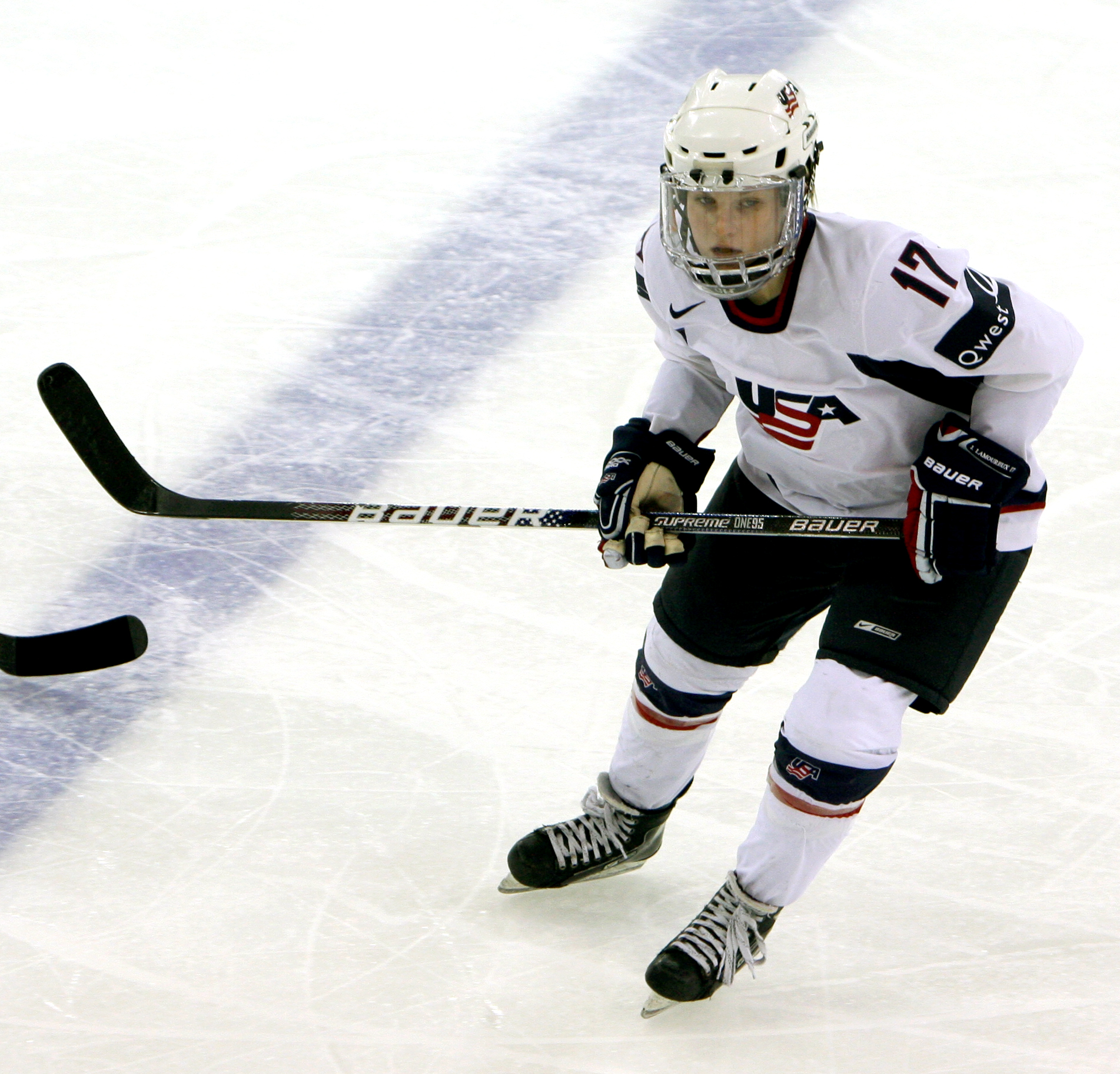
Jocelyne Lamoureux, 2011–12 and 2012–13 Student-Athlete of the Year

Season	Player	Pos.	School
1999–2000^{†}	Katie Beaudy	Goaltender	Minnesota State
1999–2000^{†}	Shannon Kennedy	Forward	Minnesota
2000–01	Bre Dedrickson	Goaltender	Bemidji State
2001–02	Guylaine Haché	Forward	Bemidji State
2002–03	Anik Coté	Goaltender	Bemidji State
2003–04	Emma Laaksonen	Defense	Ohio State
2004–05	Caroline Ouellette	Forward	Minnesota–Duluth
2005–06	Riitta Schaublin	Goaltender	Minnesota–Duluth
2006–07	Riitta Schaublin (2)	Goaltender	Minnesota–Duluth
2007–08	Casie Hanson	Forward	North Dakota
2008–09	Gigi Marvin	Forward	Minnesota
2009–10	Caitlin Hogan	Forward	St. Cloud State
2010–11	Jocelyne Larocque	Defense	Minnesota–Duluth
2011–12	Jocelyne Lamoureux	Forward	North Dakota
2012–13	Jocelyne Lamoureux (2)	Forward	North Dakota
2013–14	Kelly Terry	Forward	Minnesota
2014–15	Shelby Amsley-Benzie	Goaltender	North Dakota
2015–16	Shelby Amsley-Benzie (2)	Goaltender	North Dakota
2016–17	Lara Stalder	Forward	Minnesota–Duluth
2017–18	Catherine Daoust	Defense	Minnesota–Duluth
2018–19	Corbin Boyd	Forward	Minnesota State
2019–20	Alex Woken	Forward	Minnesota
2020–21	Mak Langei	Forward	Bemidji State
2021–22	Sophie Jaques	Defense	Ohio State
2022–23	Emma Söderberg	Goaltender	Minnesota–Duluth
2023–24	Clara Van Wieren	Forward	Minnesota–Duluth
2024–25	Clara Van Wieren (2)	Forward	Minnesota–Duluth
2025–26	Mary Kate O'Brien	Forward	Minnesota–Duluth

=== Winners by school ===
School	Winners	Years
Minnesota–Duluth	10	2004–05, 2005–06, 2006–07, 2010–11, 2016–17, 2017–18, 2022–23, 2023–24, 2024–25, 2025–26
North Dakota	5	2007–08, 2011–12, 2012–13, 2014–15, 2015–16
Minnesota	4	1999–2000^{†}, 2008–09, 2013–14, 2019–20
Bemidji State	4	2000–01, 2001–02, 2002–03, 2020–21
Minnesota State	2	1999–2000^{†}, 2018–19
Ohio State	2	2003–04, 2021–22
St. Cloud State	1	2009–10

== Defensive Player of the Year ==
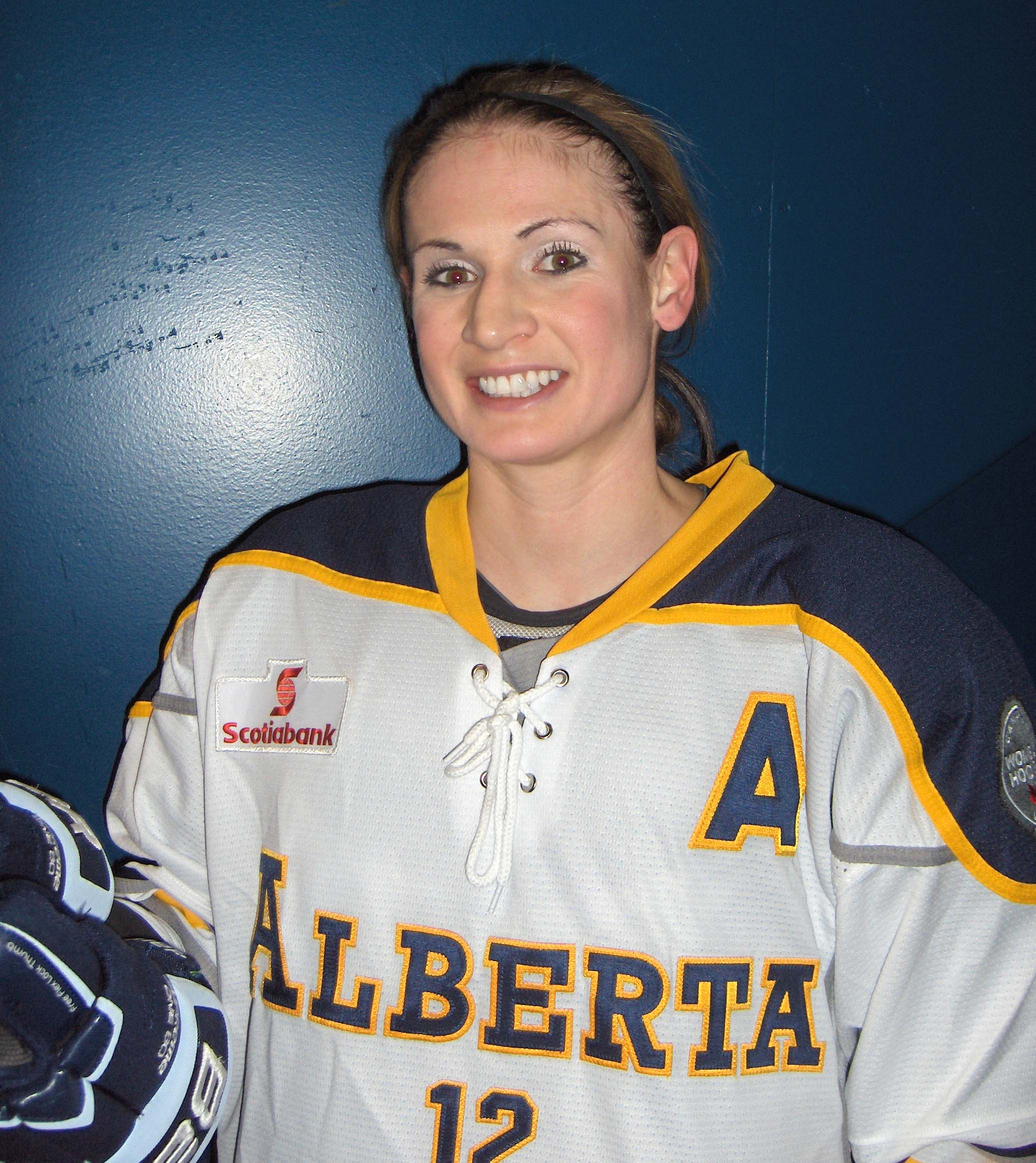
Meaghan Mikkelson, 2006–07 Defensive Player of the Year

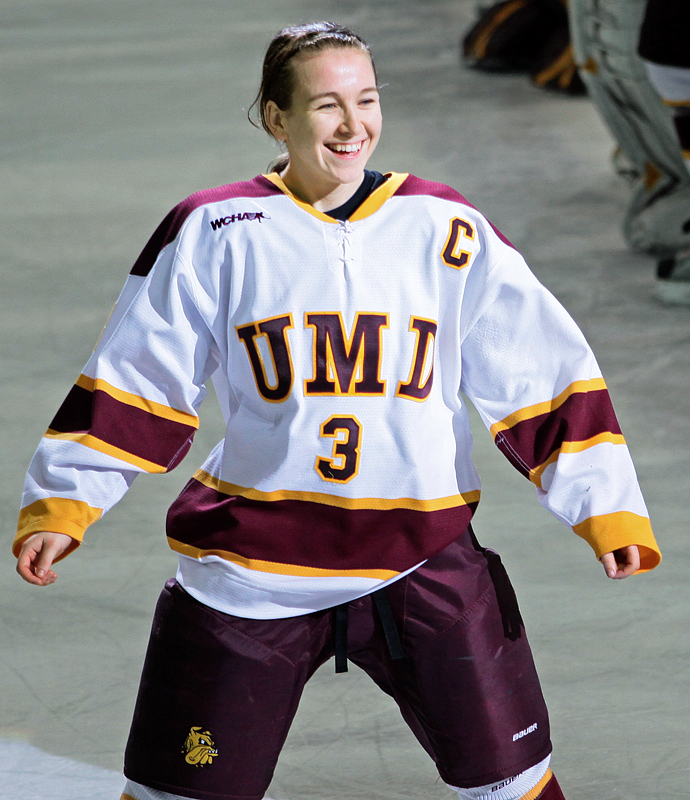
Jocelyne Larocque, 2010–11 Defensive Player of the Year

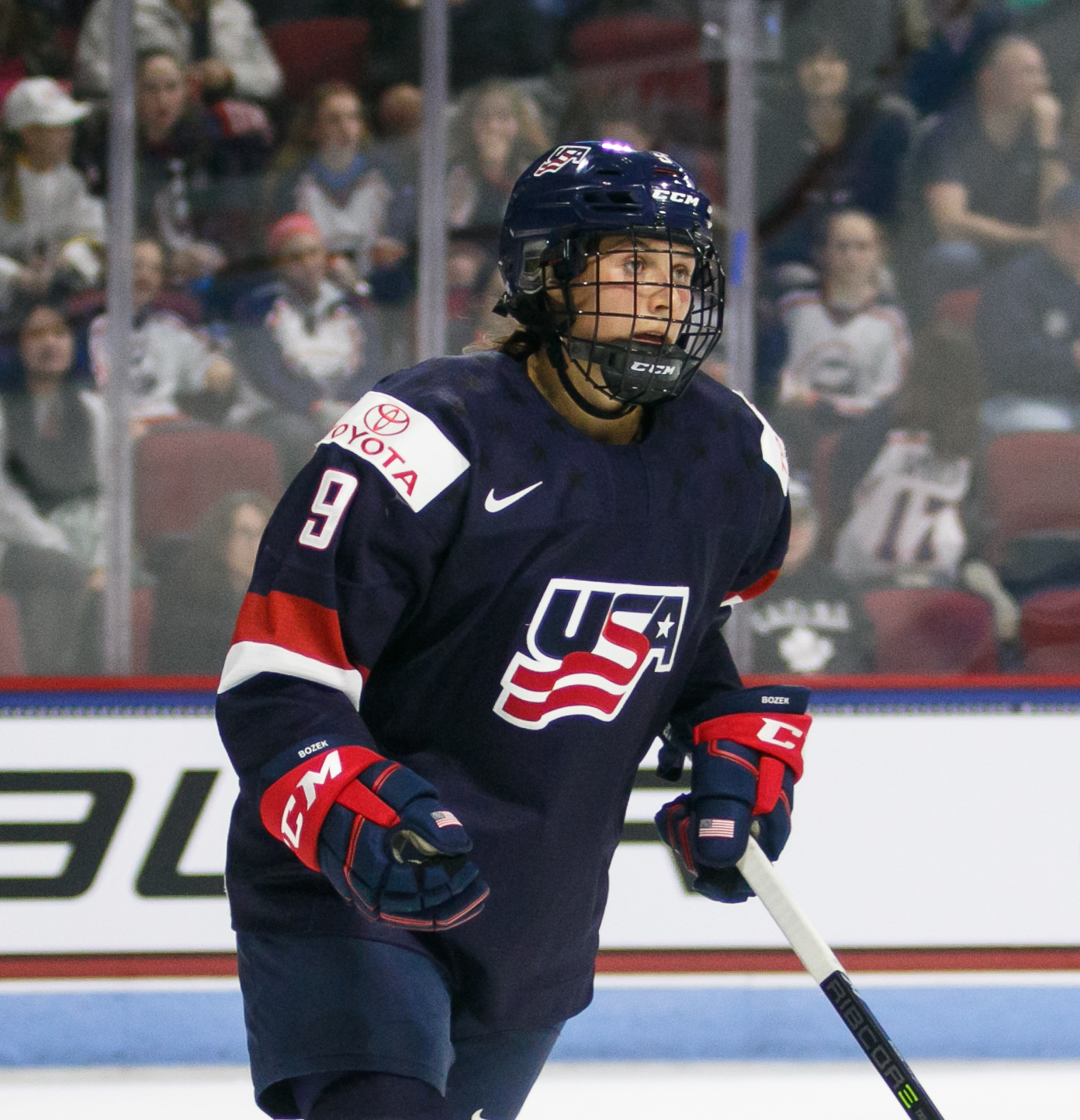
Megan Bozek, 2012–13 Defensive Player of the Year

Season	Player	School
1999–2000	Winny Brodt	Minnesota
2000–01	Courtney Kennedy	Minnesota
2001–02	Ronda Curtin	Minnesota
2002–03	Ronda Curtin (2)	Minnesota
2003–04	Molly Engstrom	Wisconsin
2004–05	Molly Engstrom (2)	Wisconsin
2005–06	Bobbi-Jo Slusar	Wisconsin
2006–07	Meaghan Mikkelson	Wisconsin
2007–08	Tessa Bonhomme	Ohio State
2008–09	Melanie Gagnon	Minnesota
2009–10	Anne Schleper	Minnesota
2010–11	Jocelyne Larocque	Minnesota–Duluth
2011–12	Stefanie McKeough	Wisconsin
2012–13	Megan Bozek	Minnesota
2013–14	Rachel Ramsey	Minnesota
2014–15	Rachel Ramsey (2)	Minnesota
2015–16	Ivana Bilic	Bemidji State
2016–17	Sidney Morin	Minnesota–Duluth
2017–18	Sydney Baldwin	Minnesota
2018–19	Jincy Dunne	Ohio State
2019–20	Jincy Dunne (2)	Ohio State
2020–21	Ashton Bell	Minnesota–Duluth
2021–22	Sophie Jaques	Ohio State
2022–23	Sophie Jaques (2)	Ohio State
2023–24	Caroline Harvey	Wisconsin
2024–25	Caroline Harvey (2)	Wisconsin
2025–26	Caroline Harvey (3)	Wisconsin

=== Winners by school ===
School	Winners	Years
Minnesota	10	1999–2000, 2000–01, 2001–02, 2002–03, 2008–09, 2009–10, 2012–13, 2013–14, 2014–15, 2017–18
Wisconsin	8	2003–04, 2004–05, 2005–06, 2006–07, 2011–12, 2023–24, 2024–25, 2025–26
Ohio State	5	2007–08, 2018–19, 2019–20, 2021–22, 2022–23
Minnesota–Duluth	3	2010–11, 2016–17, 2020–21
Bemidji State	1	2015–16

== Rookie of the Year ==
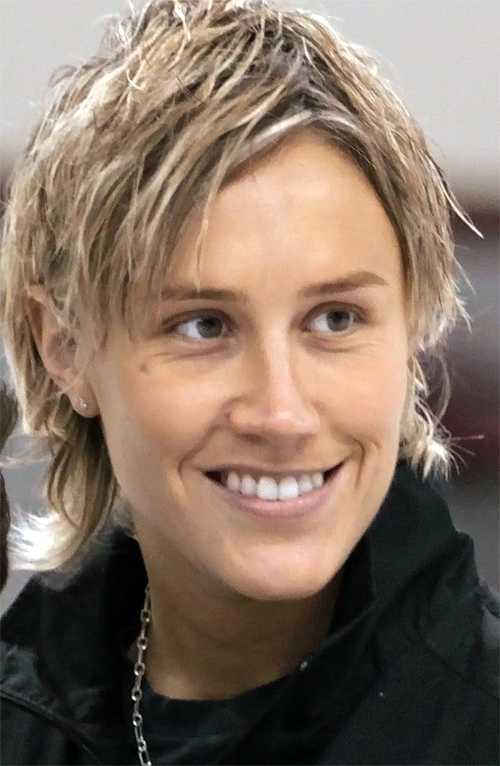
Maria Rooth, 1999–2000 Rookie of the Year

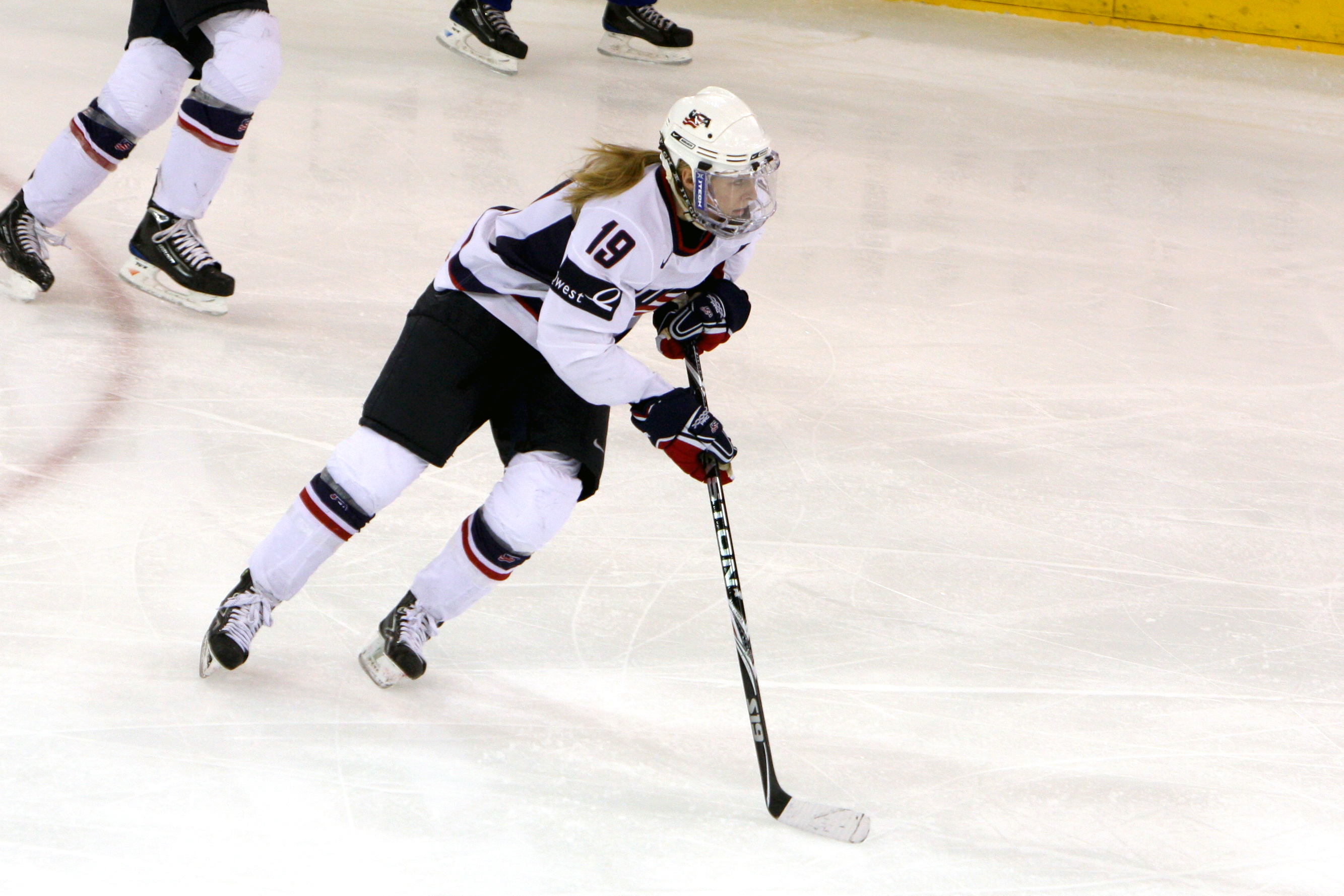
Gigi Marvin, 2005–06 Rookie of the Year

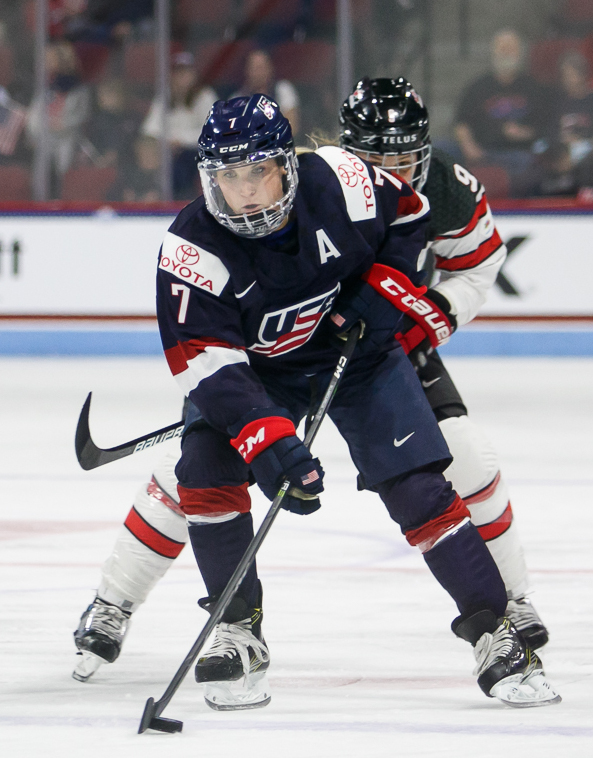
Monique Lamoureux, 2008–09 Rookie of the Year

Season	Player	Pos.	School
1999–2000	Maria Rooth	Forward	Minnesota–Duluth
2000–01	Meghan Hunter	Forward	Wisconsin
2001–02	Jeni Creary	Forward	Ohio State
2002–03	Natalie Darwitz	Forward	Minnesota
2003–04	Sara Bauer	Forward	Wisconsin
2004–05	Bobbi Ross	Forward	Minnesota
2005–06	Gigi Marvin	Forward	Minnesota
2006–07	Meghan Duggan	Forward	Wisconsin
2007–08	Haley Irwin	Forward	Minnesota–Duluth
2008–09	Monique Lamoureux	Forward	Minnesota
2009–10	Hokey Langan	Forward	Ohio State
2010–11	Amanda Kessel	Forward	Minnesota
2011–12	Michelle Karvinen	Forward	North Dakota
2012–13	Hannah Brandt	Forward	Minnesota
2013–14	Dani Cameranesi	Forward	Minnesota
2014–15	Annie Pankowski	Forward	Wisconsin
2015–16	Sarah Potomak	Forward	Minnesota
2016–17	Abby Roque	Forward	Wisconsin
2017–18	Emma Maltais	Forward	Ohio State
2018–19	Sophie Shirley	Forward	Wisconsin
2019–20	Madeline Wethington	Forward	Minnesota
2020–21	Jamie Nelson	Forward	Minnesota State
2021–22	Peyton Hemp	Forward	Minnesota
2022–23	Caroline Harvey	Defense	Wisconsin
2023–24	Joy Dunne	Forward	Ohio State
2024–25	Caitlin Kraemer	Forward	Minnesota–Duluth
2025–26	Hilda Svensson	Forward	Ohio State

=== Winners by school ===
School	Winners	Years
Minnesota	10	2002–03, 2004–05, 2005–06, 2008–09, 2010–11, 2012–13, 2013–14, 2015–16, 2019–20, 2021–22
Wisconsin	7	2000–01, 2003–04, 2006–07, 2014–15, 2016–17, 2018–19, 2022–23
Ohio State	5	2001–02, 2009–10, 2017–18, 2023–24, 2025–26
Minnesota–Duluth	3	1999–2000, 2007–08, 2024–25
Minnesota State	1	2020–21
North Dakota	1	2011–12

== Coach of the Year ==
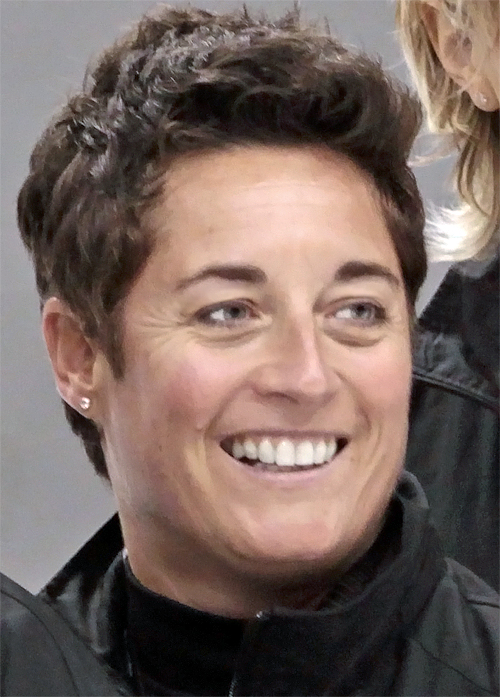
Shannon Miller, 1999–2000 and 2002–03 Coach of the Year for Minnesota–Duluth

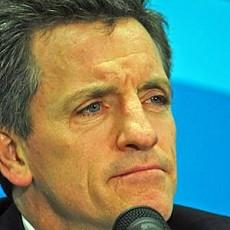
Mark Johnson, 11–time WCHA Coach of the Year for Wisconsin

Season	Coach	School
1999–2000	Shannon Miller	Minnesota–Duluth
2000–01^{†}	Laura Halldorson	Minnesota
2000–01^{†}	Kerry Wethington	St. Cloud State
2001–02	Laura Halldorson (2)	Minnesota
2002–03^{†}	Mark Johnson	Wisconsin
2002–03^{†}	Shannon Miller (2)	Minnesota–Duluth
2003–04	Jeff Vizenor	Minnesota State
2004–05	Laura Halldorson (3)	Minnesota
2005–06	Mark Johnson (2)	Wisconsin
2006–07	Mark Johnson (3)	Wisconsin
2007–08	Brad Frost	Minnesota
2008–09^{†}	Brad Frost (2)	Minnesota
2008–09^{†}	Mark Johnson (4)	Wisconsin
2009–10	Steve Sertich	Bemidji State
2010–11	Mark Johnson (5)	Wisconsin
2011–12	Mark Johnson (6)	Wisconsin
2012–13	Brad Frost (3)	Minnesota
2013–14	Brad Frost (4)	Minnesota
2014–15	Jim Scanlan	Bemidji State
2015–16	Mark Johnson (7)	Wisconsin
2016–17	Maura Crowell	Minnesota–Duluth
2017–18	Nadine Muzerall	Ohio State
2018–19	Mark Johnson (8)	Wisconsin
2019–20	Nadine Muzerall (2)	Ohio State
2020–21	Mark Johnson (9)	Wisconsin
2021–22	Nadine Muzerall (3)	Ohio State
2022–23^{†}	Brian Idalski	St. Cloud State
2022–23^{†}	Nadine Muzerall (4)	Ohio State
2023–24	Nadine Muzerall (5)	Ohio State
2024–25	Mark Johnson (10)	Wisconsin
2025–26	Mark Johnson (11)	Wisconsin

=== Winners by school ===
School	Winners	Years
Wisconsin	11	2002–03^{†}, 2005–06, 2006–07, 2008–09^{†}, 2010–11, 2011–12, 2015–16, 2018–19, 2020–21, 2024–25, 2025–26
Minnesota	7	2000–01^{†}, 2001–02, 2004–05, 2007–08, 2008–09^{†}, 2012–13, 2013–14
Ohio State	5	2017–18, 2019–20, 2021–22, 2022–23^{†}, 2023–24
Minnesota–Duluth	3	1999–2000, 2002–03^{†}, 2016–17
Bemidji State	2	2009–10, 2014–15
St. Cloud State	2	2000–01^{†}, 2022–23^{†}
Minnesota State	1	2003–04

== Statistical leaders ==
=== Scoring champion ===
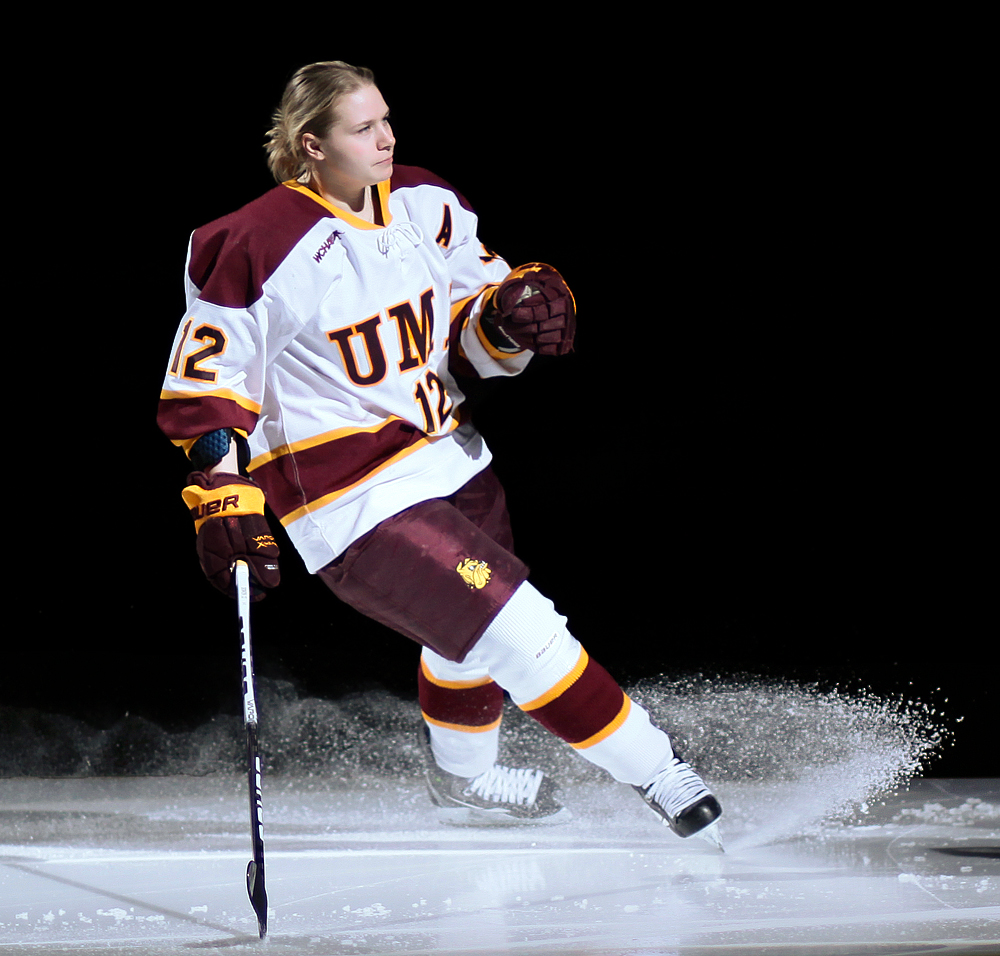
Haley Irwin, top scorer in 2007–08

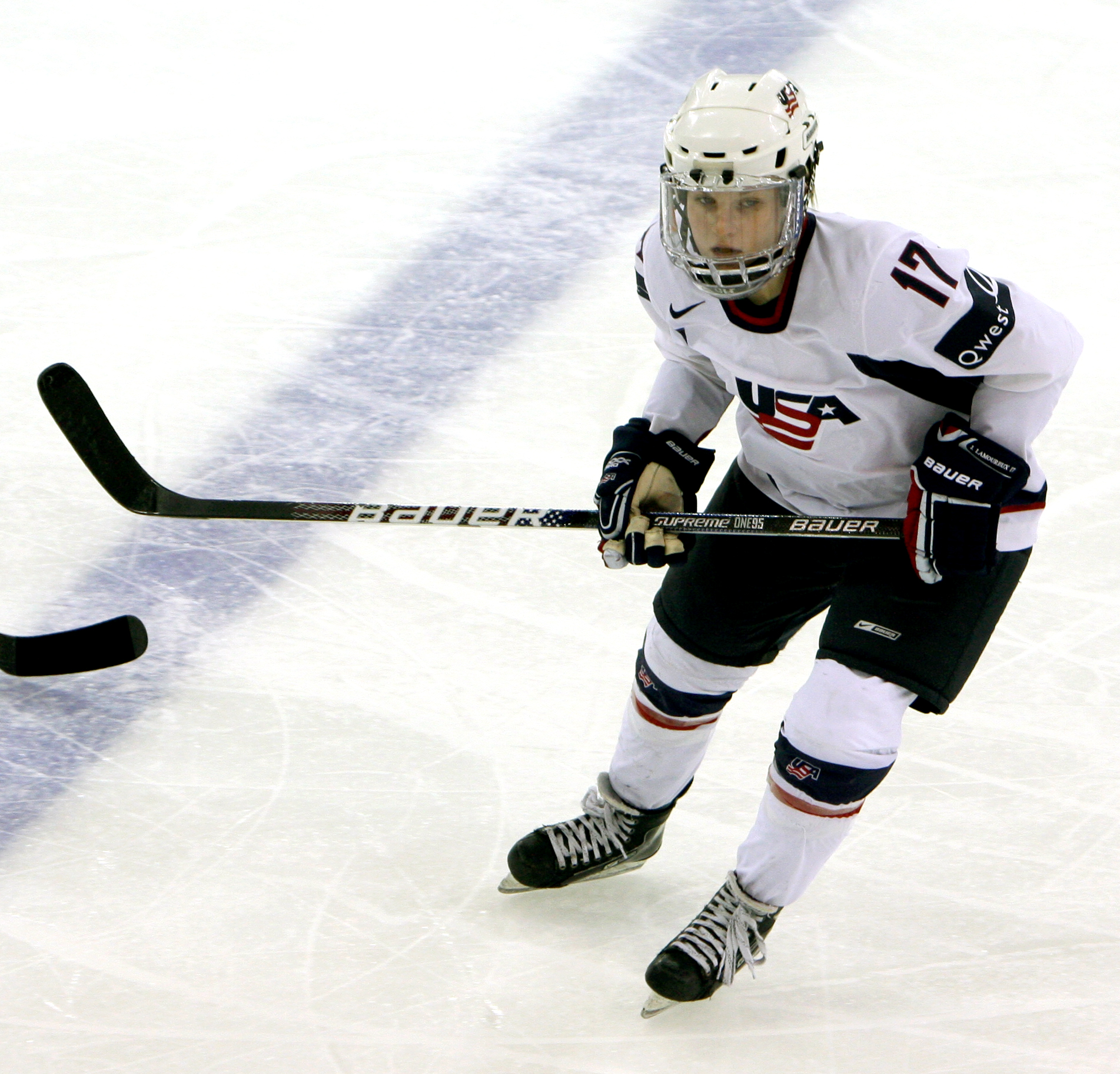
Jocelyne Lamoureux, top scorer in 2011–12

Season	Player	Position	School	Games	Goals	Assists	Points
2003–04	Jenny Schmidgall-Potter	Forward	Minnesota–Duluth	24	28	29	57
2004–05	Natalie Darwitz	Forward	Minnesota	28	27	45	72
2005–06	Erica McKenzie	Forward	Minnesota	28	18	22	40
2006–07	Sara Bauer	Forward	Wisconsin	28	16	35	51
2007–08	Haley Irwin	Forward	Minnesota–Duluth	26	18	25	43
2008–09	Monique Lamoureux	Forward	Minnesota	28	30	31	61
2009–10	Hokey Langan	Forward	Ohio State	28	25	26	51
2010–11	Meghan Duggan	Forward	Wisconsin	28	27	34	61
2011–12	Jocelyne Lamoureux	Forward	North Dakota	28	27	37	64
2012–13	Amanda Kessel	Forward	Minnesota	25	34	41	75
2013–14	Hannah Brandt	Forward	Minnesota	28	14	26	40
2014–15	Hannah Brandt (2)	Forward	Minnesota	27	21	29	50
2015–16	Dani Cameranesi	Forward	Minnesota	28	24	29	53
2016–17	Kelly Pannek	Forward	Minnesota	32	16	31	47
2017–18	Grace Zumwinkle	Forward	Minnesota	24	11	16	27
2018–19^{†}	Nicole Schammel	Forward	Minnesota	24	10	17	27
2018–19^{†}	Emma Maltais	Forward	Ohio State	24	10	17	27
2019–20	Daryl Watts	Forward	Wisconsin	24	14	35	49
2020–21	Daryl Watts (2)	Forward	Wisconsin	16	15	16	31
2021–22	Taylor Heise	Forward	Minnesota	28	18	28	46
2022–23	Taylor Heise (2)	Forward	Minnesota	28	19	32	51
2023–24	Kirsten Simms	Forward	Wisconsin	26	22	25	47
2024–25	Casey O'Brien	Forward	Wisconsin	28	17	35	52
2025–26	Lacey Eden	Forward	Wisconsin	29	21	33	54

==== Winners by school ====
School	Winners	Years
Minnesota	12	2004–05, 2005–06, 2008–09, 2012–13, 2013–14, 2014–15, 2015–16, 2016–17, 2017–18, 2018–19^{†}, 2021–22, 2022–23
Wisconsin	7	2006–07, 2010–11, 2019–20, 2020–21, 2023–24, 2024–25, 2025–26
Minnesota–Duluth	2	2003–04, 2007–08
Ohio State	2	2009–10, 2018–19^{†}
North Dakota	1	2011–12

=== Goaltending champion ===
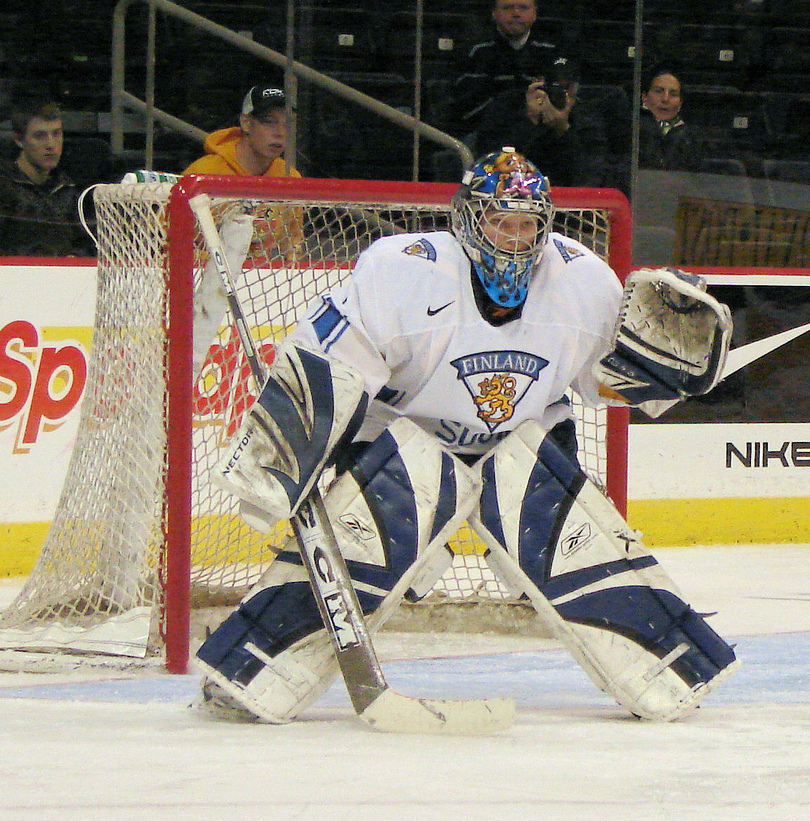
Noora Räty, top goaltender in 2009–10 and 2012–13

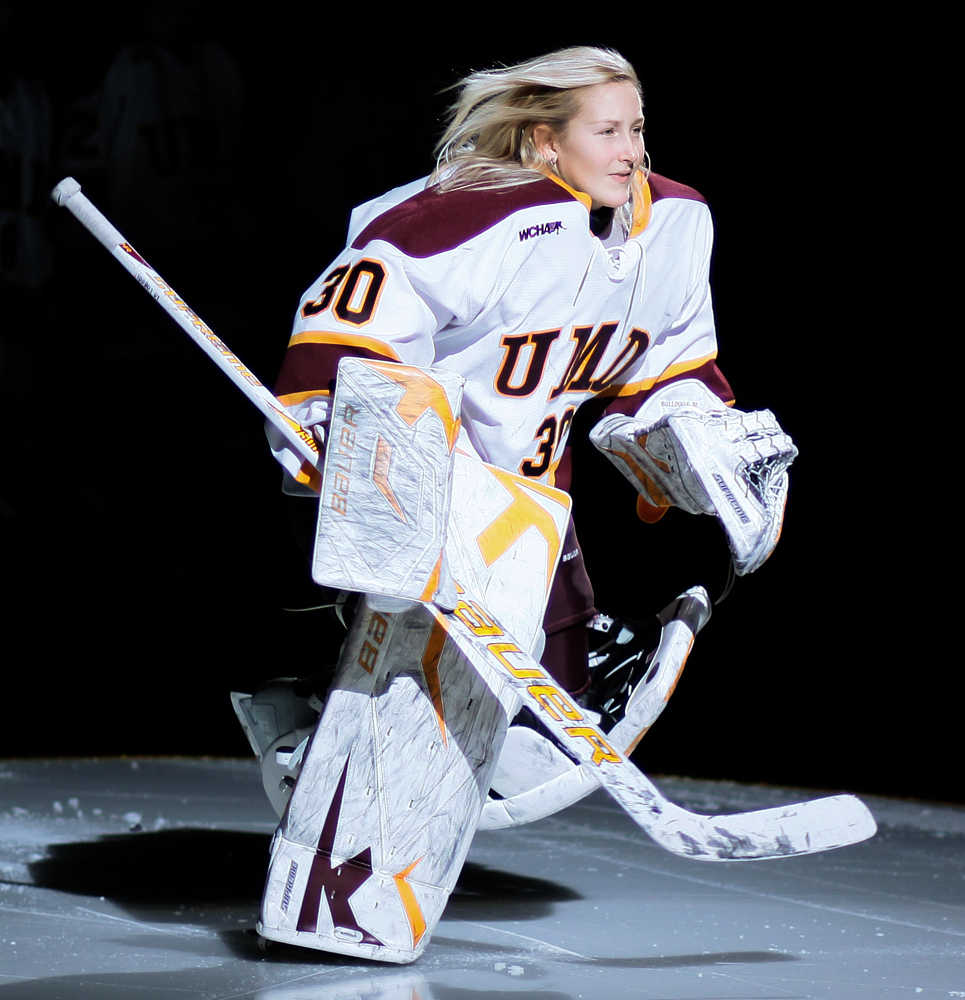
Kim Martin, top goaltender in 2010–11

Season	Player	School	Games	GAA
2003–04	Meghan Horras	Wisconsin	12	1.32
2004–05	Jody Horak	Minnesota	19	0.89
2005–06	Kim Hanlon	Minnesota	14	1.19
2006–07	Christine Dufour	Wisconsin	12	1.07
2007–08	Jessie Vetter	Wisconsin	26	1.38
2008–09	Alyssa Grogan	Minnesota	14	1.37
2009–10	Noora Räty	Minnesota	15	1.06
2010–11	Kim Martin	Minnesota–Duluth	17	1.51
2011–12	Alex Rigsby	Wisconsin	28	1.47
2012–13	Noora Räty (2)	Minnesota	28	1.05
2013–14	Ann-Renée Desbiens	Wisconsin	28	0.97
2014–15	Shelby Amsley-Benzie	North Dakota	28	1.17
2015–16	Ann-Renée Desbiens (2)	Wisconsin	27	0.81
2016–17	Ann-Renée Desbiens (3)	Wisconsin	30	0.66
2017–18	Kristen Campbell	Wisconsin	24	1.16
2018–19	Kristen Campbell (2)	Wisconsin	24	1.08
2019–20	Sydney Scobee	Minnesota	24	1.63
2020–21	Emma Söderberg	Minnesota–Duluth	19	1.34
2021–22	Emma Polusny	St. Cloud State	19	2.85
2022–23	Emma Söderberg (2)	Minnesota–Duluth	23	1.59
2023–24	Sanni Ahola	St. Cloud State	13	1.86
2024–25	Ava McNaughton	Wisconsin	27	1.28
2025–26	Ève Gascon	Minnesota–Duluth	26	1.89

==== Winners by school ====
School	Winners	Years
Wisconsin	10	2003–04, 2006–07, 2007–08, 2011–12, 2013–14, 2015–16, 2016–17, 2017–18, 2018–19, 2024–25
Minnesota	6	2004–05, 2005–06, 2008–09, 2009–10, 2012–13, 2019–20
Minnesota–Duluth	4	2010–11, 2020–21, 2022–23, 2025–26
St. Cloud State	2	2021–22, 2023–24
North Dakota	1	2014–15

== Team of the Decade ==
In 2009, to commemorate the tenth year of women's play, the WCHA chose the top ten players of the decade.

Player	Position	School
(Canada) Sara Bauer	Forward	Wisconsin
(Canada) Tessa Bonhomme	Defense	Ohio State
(United States) Ronda Curtin	Defense	Minnesota
(United States) Natalie Darwitz	Forward	Minnesota
(United States) Molly Engstrom	Defense	Wisconsin
(Canada) Caroline Ouellette	Forward	Minnesota–Duluth
(United States) Jenny Schmidgall-Potter	Forward	Minnesota and Minnesota–Duluth
(Sweden) Maria Rooth	Forward	Minnesota–Duluth
(United States) Jessie Vetter	Goaltender	Wisconsin
(United States) Krissy Wendell	Forward	Minnesota

== 25th Anniversary Top 25 Team ==
Throughout the 2023–24 season, to commemorate 25 seasons of women's play, the WCHA named the top 25 players throughout its 25 years.

Player	Position	School
(Canada) Sara Bauer	Forward	Wisconsin (2003–07)
(Canada) Tessa Bonhomme	Defense	Ohio State (2004–08)
(United States) Hannah Brandt	Forward	Minnesota (2012–16)
(United States) Natalie Darwitz	Forward	Minnesota (2002–05)
(United States) Brianna Decker	Forward	Wisconsin (2009–13)
(Canada) Ann-Renée Desbiens	Goaltender	Wisconsin (2013–17)
(United States) Meghan Duggan	Forward	Wisconsin (2006–11)
(United States) Jincy Roese	Defense	Ohio State (2016–20)
(United States) Molly Engstrom	Defense	Wisconsin (2001–05)
(United States) Taylor Heise	Forward	Minnesota (2018–23)
(Canada) Sophie Jaques	Defense	Ohio State (2018–23)
(United States) Amanda Kessel	Forward	Minnesota (2010–13, 16)
(United States) Hilary Knight	Forward	Wisconsin (2007–12)
(United States) Jocelyne Lamoureux-Davidson	Forward	Minnesota & North Dakota (2008–13)
(United States) Monique Lamoreux-Morando	Forward	Minnesota & North Dakota (2008–13)
(Sweden) Kim Martin Hasson	Goaltender	Minnesota–Duluth (2006–11)
(Canada) Sarah Nurse	Forward	Wisconsin (2013–17)
(Canada) Caroline Ouellette	Forward	Minnesota–Duluth (2002–05)
(Finland) Noora Räty	Goaltender	Minnesota (2009–13)
(Sweden) Maria Rooth	Forward	Minnesota–Duluth (1999–03)
(United States) Jenny Schmidgall-Potter	Forward	Minnesota & Minnesota–Duluth (1999–04)
(Canada) Natalie Spooner	Forward	Ohio State (2008–12)
(United States) Lee Stecklein	Forward	Minnesota (2012–17)
(United States) Jessie Vetter	Goaltender	Wisconsin (2005–09)
(United States) Krissy Wendell	Forward	Minnesota (2002–05)

== Sources ==
- "WCHA 2014–15 Women's Record Book" (PDF). Western Collegiate Hockey Association. p. 113. Archived (PDF) from the original on July 1, 2017.
- "WCHA Announces 2015-16 Postseason Awards". Western Collegiate Hockey Association. March 3, 2016. Archived from the original on July 1, 2017.
- "WCHA Announces 2016-17 Postseason Awards". Western Collegiate Hockey Association. March 2, 2017. Archived from the original on July 1, 2017.
- "WCHA Season Reviews - 1999-2021" (PDF). WCHA.com. Western Collegiate Hockey Association.
