= Wisconsin Badgers ice hockey =

Wisconsin Badgers ice hockey may refer to either of the ice hockey teams that represent the University of Wisconsin–Madison:

- Wisconsin Badgers men's ice hockey
- Wisconsin Badgers women's ice hockey
