= Krissy Wendell-Pohl =

American ice hockey player (born 1981)

- Hockey Hall of Fame, 2024
- Born: September 12, 1981 (age 45) Brooklyn Park, Minnesota, U.S.
- Height: 5 ft 7 in (170 cm)
- Weight: 155 lb (70 kg; 11 st 1 lb)
- Position: Forward
- Shot: Left
- Played for: University of Minnesota
- National team: United States
- Playing career: 1999–2007
Medal record
Women's ice hockey
Representing United States
Olympic Games
Silver medal – second place	2002 Salt Lake City	Tournament
Bronze medal – third place	2006 Turin	Tournament
IIHF World Women's Championships
Gold medal – first place	2005 Sweden	Tournament
Silver medal – second place	1999 Finland	Tournament
Silver medal – second place	2000 Canada	Tournament
Silver medal – second place	2001 United States	Tournament
Silver medal – second place	2004 Canada	Tournament
Silver medal – second place	2007 Canada	Tournament

Kristin Elizabeth Wendell-Pohl (born September 12, 1981) is an American former ice hockey player and amateur scout for the Pittsburgh Penguins of the NHL. During the 2004–05 season, Wendell set an NCAA record for most short-handed goals in one season, with seven. At the conclusion of her college career, she held the record for most career short-handed goals, with 16. Both marks have since been equaled by Meghan Agosta. Wendell is in the top 10 for all-time NCAA scoring, with 237 career points.

== Playing career ==
While attending Park Center Senior High School in Brooklyn Park, Minnesota, Wendell led the girls' hockey team to a state championship. At the time she graduated from high school, Wendell was the state of Minnesota's all-time leading girls' high school scorer.

Wendell was a co-captain of the Minnesota Golden Gophers women's ice hockey team. A forward, she scored 133 points in two seasons (2002–2003, 2003–2004) for the Gophers. Wendell scored the game-winning goal in the 2005 Western Collegiate Hockey Association (WCHA) championship game against Wisconsin. Wendell followed that with a hat-trick against ECAC champion Harvard. Wendell was the NCAA runner-up in the scoring race to her teammate Natalie Darwitz with 98 points. Wendell did lead the NCAA in short-handed goals, with seven. She won the Patty Kazmaier Award in 2005 for best female collegiate hockey player. Wendell was the first player from Minnesota, and the first from the WCHA, to win the award.

Wendell was one of the stars of the United States women's national ice hockey team, and served as their team captain. She made her debut with the team at the 1998 Three Nations Cup. At the 2005 IIHF Women's World Championship, Wendell was named MVP, and led all players in scoring with nine points, as the United States won its first gold medal at the women's world championships. She was a member of the United States team at the 2006 Winter Olympics, winning a bronze medal.

== Post-playing career ==
Following her playing career, Wendell-Pohl coached girls high school hockey in Minnesota with her husband, and former NHL player, Johnny Pohl. She was then hired by the Pittsburgh Penguins as a scout on November 6, 2021, becoming the third woman to hold a scouting position with an NHL team after Cammi Granato and Blake Bolden. Her responsibilities are to scout amateur players, predominantly high school players, in the Minnesota area.

In 2024, Wendell-Pohl was announced as an inductee into the Hockey Hall of Fame.

== Personal life ==
In 1994, Wendell was the fifth girl to play in the Little League World Series, and the first to start at the catcher position.

Wendell was featured on the Nickelodeon game show, Figure It Out, when she was 16.

She married NHL player John Pohl on August 11, 2007, in Roseville, Minnesota. They have three daughters.

== Awards ==
- 2000 Minnesota Ms. Hockey Award
- 2000 Bob Johnson Award for excellence in international competition (awarded at the USA Hockey Annual Congress)
- 2001 Bob Allen Women's Player of the Year Award
- 2002 Olympic Silver Medal
- 2003, 2004 NCAA D1 W. Ice Hockey Champion
- 2004 Little League Hall of Excellence
- 2004 NCAA Division I women's ice hockey tournament Most Outstanding Player
- 2004 NCAA All-Tournament Team
- 2005 NCAA All-Tournament Team
- 2005 Patty Kazmaier Award
- 2005 USA Hockey Bob Johnson Award
- 2005 Most Valuable Player, Women's World Hockey Championships
- 2006 Olympic Bronze Medal
- 2007 All-Star, Women's World Hockey Championships
- 2019 U.S. Hockey Hall of Fame
- 2024 Hockey Hall of Fame

Awards and achievements
Preceded by Cammi Granato	Captain, United States Olympic Hockey Team; 2006	Succeeded by Natalie Darwitz
Preceded by Jennifer Botterill	IIHF World Women's Championships Most Valuable Player; 2005	Succeeded by Hayley Wickenheiser
Preceded by Angela Ruggiero	Patty Kazmaier Award; 2004–05	Succeeded by Sara Bauer
