= Blayre Turnbull =

Canadian ice hockey player (born 1993)

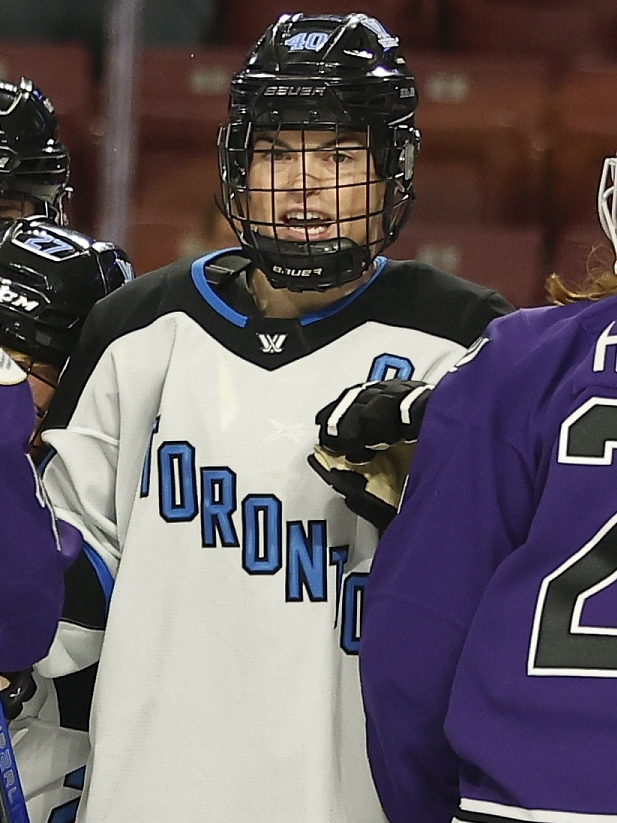
- Turnbull with PWHL Toronto in 2024
- Born: July 15, 1993 (age 33) New Glasgow, Nova Scotia, Canada
- Height: 5 ft 7 in (170 cm)
- Weight: 159 lb (72 kg; 11 st 5 lb)
- Position: Forward
- Shoots: Right
- PWHL team Former teams: Toronto Sceptres; Calgary Inferno; Wisconsin Badgers
- National team: Canada
- Playing career: 2011–present
- Website: blayreturnbull.com
Medal record
Women's ice hockey
Representing Canada
Olympic Games
Gold medal – first place	2022 Beijing	Team
Silver medal – second place	2018 Pyeongchang	Team
Silver medal – second place	2026 Milano Cortina	Team
World Championships
Gold medal – first place	2021 Canada
Gold medal – first place	2022 Denmark
Gold medal – first place	2024 United States
Silver medal – second place	2016 Canada
Silver medal – second place	2017 United States
Silver medal – second place	2023 Canada
Silver medal – second place	2025 Czechia
Bronze medal – third place	2019 Finland

Blayre Turnbull (born July 15, 1993) is a Canadian professional ice hockey forward and captain for the Toronto Sceptres of the Professional Women's Hockey League (PWHL). She made her debut with the Canada women's national ice hockey team at the 2014 4 Nations Cup. She has represented Canada at multiple Winter Olympics, winning silver in 2018 while serving as alternate captain, gold in 2022, and silver in 2026, once again serving as alternate captain.

On September 6, 2023, Turnbull signed a three-year deal with the PWHL Toronto, now known as the Toronto Sceptres, of the newly formed new Professional Women's Hockey League. Turnbull has served as team captain of the Sceptres since the team's inception.

== Career ==
Turnbull attended Shattuck-St. Mary's, where she was a classmate of Nathan MacKinnon and played on the girls' hockey team. As a junior, she appeared in 52 contests while gaining 60 points (on 30 goals and 30 assists). With the team, won two national championships in two years.

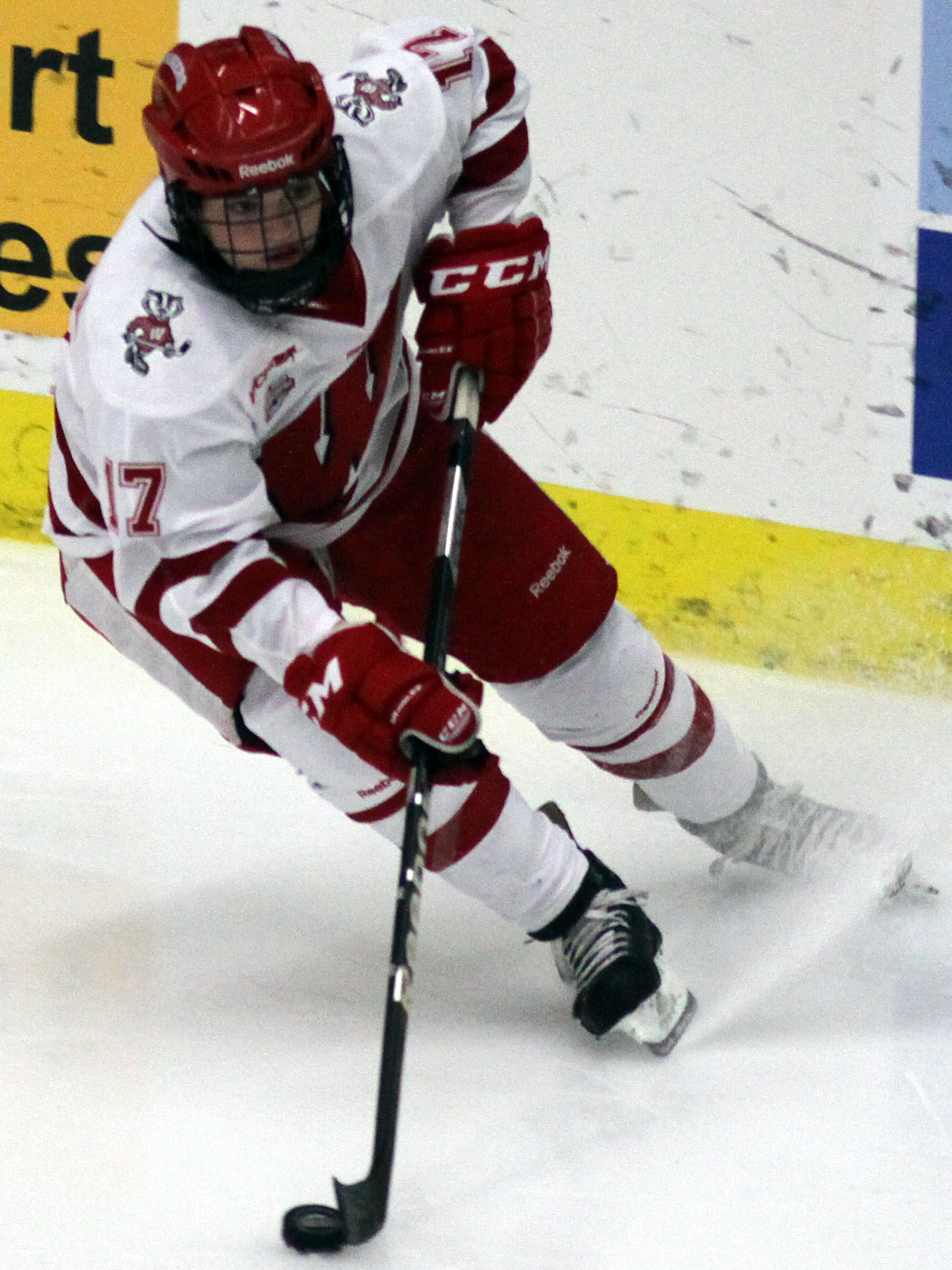
Turnbull with Wisconsin in 2013

=== College ===
The 2011–12 Wisconsin Badgers season marked her first with the club. In a match versus the Lindenwood Lady Lions on September 25, 2011, she scored her first career NCAA goal. She holds various UW records and the NCAA record for shorthanded goals in a season. She was the captain of the Wisconsin Badgers in her junior and senior year and is an NCAA champion. She played for the Badgers for a total of four seasons, identifying herself in her Twitter account as having graduated in 2015.

=== CWHL ===
Turnbull helped the Calgary Inferno capture their first-ever Clarkson Cup championship in 2016. Contested at Ottawa's Canadian Tire Centre, she scored twice in an 8–3 victory over Les Canadiennes de Montreal.

She would miss most of the 2017-18 CWHL season training with Team Canada for the Olympics but returned in time for the playoffs. In 2019, Turnbull would win her second Clarkson Cup with Calgary.

In May 2019, Turnbull joined the PWHPA after the collapse of the CWHL. She participated in the 2020 NHL All-Star Game with the Canadian All-Stars.

=== PWHL ===
Following the launch of the new Professional Women's Hockey League (PWHL), Turnbull was one of three players (alongside fellow Canadian Olympians Sarah Nurse and Renata Fast) signed within a pre-draft period to PWHL Toronto.

== International play ==
=== Junior ===
Turnbull participated with Team Atlantic at the 2009 Canadian Under 19 nationals. She competed in the shootout for Team Atlantic in the quarterfinals versus Team Ontario Blue in a losing effort. On two occasions, she attended training camp for the 2010 and 2011 IIHF World Women's under-18. For the 2011 camp, Turnbull was one of only two Nova Scotians who were invited.

=== Senior ===
==== World Championships ====
In 2016, Turnball made her debut for the senior national team and competed at the 2016 IIHF Women's World Championship in Kamloops, BC. She also played for Canada in the 2017 and 2019 World Championships and was selected for the 2020 World Championships before they were cancelled due to the 2019-20 coronavirus outbreak.

In 2021, Turnbull played for Canada at the 2021 IIHF Women's World Championship, and suffered a broken fibula during the celebration after winning the gold medal. She later called the incident her most embarrassing hockey moment.

==== Olympics ====
Turnbull was selected to the Canadian roster for the 2018 Winter Olympics in Korea. She recorded 3 points in 5 games and won a silver medal.

On January 11, 2022, Turnbull was named to Canada's 2022 Olympic team. The team won the gold medal, defeating the United States in the final 3–2.

On January 9, 2026, Turnbull was named to Canada's roster to compete at the 2026 Winter Olympics in Italy. During the team's quarterfinal game against Germany, she scored Canada's fourth goal in the 38th second of the second period helping lift Canada to a 5-1 win and advance to the semifinals.

== Personal life ==
Turnbull married retired Canadian bobsledder Ryan Sommer in the summer of 2023.

Turnbull has a Bachelor of Arts degree in legal studies. Her brother Brent played for the Quebec Remparts in the QMJHL.

== Career statistics ==
=== Regular season and playoffs ===
Note: GP = Games played; G = Goals; A = Assists; Pts = Points; PIM = Penalty minutes;

			Regular season					Playoffs
Season	Team	League	GP	G	A	Pts	PIM	GP	G	A	Pts	PIM
2009–10	Shattuck St. Mary's	MSHSL	52	30	30	60	14	—	—	—	—	—
2010–11	Shattuck St. Mary's	MSHSL	46	23	30	53	47	—	—	—	—	—
2011–12	University of Wisconsin	WCHA	34	7	7	14	14	—	—	—	—	—
2012–13	University of Wisconsin	WCHA	35	3	5	8	18	—	—	—	—	—
2013–14	University of Wisconsin	WCHA	38	18	22	40	12	—	—	—	—	—
2014–15	University of Wisconsin	WCHA	36	15	21	36	18	—	—	—	—	—
2015–16	Calgary Inferno	CWHL	22	7	9	16	16	3	3	2	5	0
2016–17	Calgary Inferno	CWHL	22	9	9	18	12	—	—	—	—	—
2017–18	Canada	AMHL	15	2	6	8	4	—	—	—	—	—
2017–18	Calgary Inferno	CWHL	4	0	0	0	4	3	1	0	1	0
2018–19	Calgary Inferno	CWHL	25	12	9	21	24	4	1	2	3	4
2019–20	Calgary	PWHPA	—	—	—	—	—	—	—	—	—	—
2020–21	Calgary	PWHPA	4	3	3	6	4	—	—	—	—	—
2022–23	Team Scotiabank	PWHPA	30	12	12	24	4	—	—	—	—	—
2023–24	PWHL Toronto	PWHL	24	3	6	9	16	5	2	0	2	0
2024–25	Toronto Sceptres	PWHL	30	5	6	11	18	4	2	1	3	2
2025–26	Toronto Sceptres	PWHL	30	9	8	17	10	—	—	—	—	—
CWHL totals			73	28	27	55	56	10	5	4	9	4
PWHL totals			84	17	20	37	44	9	4	1	5	2

=== International ===
Note: GP = Games played; G = Goals; A = Assists; Pts = Points; PIM = Penalty minutes;

				Regular season
Year	Team	Event	Result	GP	G	A	Pts	PIM
2016	Canada	WC	2nd place, silver medalist(s)	5	1	2	3	2
2017	Canada	WC	2nd place, silver medalist(s)	5	1	0	1	2
2018	Canada	OG	2nd place, silver medalist(s)	5	0	3	3	0
2019	Canada	WC	3rd place, bronze medalist(s)	6	4	0	4	0
2021	Canada	WC	1st place, gold medalist(s)	7	0	1	1	8
2022	Canada	WC	1st place, gold medalist(s)	7	3	2	5	6
2022	Canada	OG	1st place, gold medalist(s)	7	4	3	7	8
2023	Canada	WC	2nd place, silver medalist(s)	7	2	4	6	6
2024	Canada	WC	1st place, gold medalist(s)	7	1	2	3	2
2025	Canada	WC	2nd place, silver medalist(s)	7	0	1	1	2
2026	Canada	OG	2nd place, silver medalist(s)	7	1	1	2	6
Senior totals				70	17	19	36	42

== Awards and honours ==
- Blayre Turnbull, WCHA Rookie of the Week (Week of October 5, 2011)
- 2012 Wisconsin Badgers Rookie of the Year

Sporting positions
Previous: Position created	Toronto Sceptres captain 2023–present	Incumbent
