= Jackie MacMillan =

American ice hockey coach

Jackie MacMillan is an American ice hockey coach.

== Career ==
MacMillan was the starting goalie for the Wisconsin Badgers women's ice hockey team for four seasons. She has served as an assistant coach for the Union Dutchwomen, as well as at St. Olaf College and at Shattuck-St. Mary's in Faribault, Minnesota. Later she was given the head coaching position at New England College before being given the same position at The College of St. Scholastica in 2009.
