= Sara Bauer =

Canadian ice hockey player (born 1984)

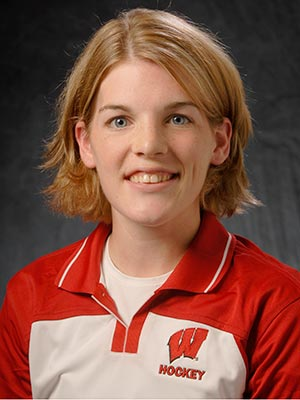
- Born: May 11, 1984 (age 42) St. Catharines, Ontario, Canada
- Played for: Wisconsin Badgers; Team Canada
- Playing career: 2003–2007
Medal record
Women's ice hockey
Representing Canada
Air Canada Cup (women's)
Gold medal – first place	2006 Germany	2006 Tournament

Sara Bauer (born May 11, 1984) is a Canadian ice hockey player who played for the Wisconsin Badgers women's ice hockey program. In four years, she accumulated 218 points. Bauer won the Patty Kazmaier Memorial Award in 2006. During the 2008–09 NCAA season, the WCHA honored its Top 10 Players from the First Decade. Among the group of top 10 players, was former Wisconsin forward Sara Bauer.

== Playing career ==
=== Hockey Canada ===
She was invited to the selection camp of the Canadian National Women's Under 22 team in 2004–05. Other invitees at the camp included future Olympians Gillian Apps, Meghan Agosta, Tessa Bonhomme and Sarah Vaillancourt. She would represent Canada at the 2006 Air Canada Cup, played in Ravensburg, Germany from January 5–7, 2006.

=== Wisconsin ===
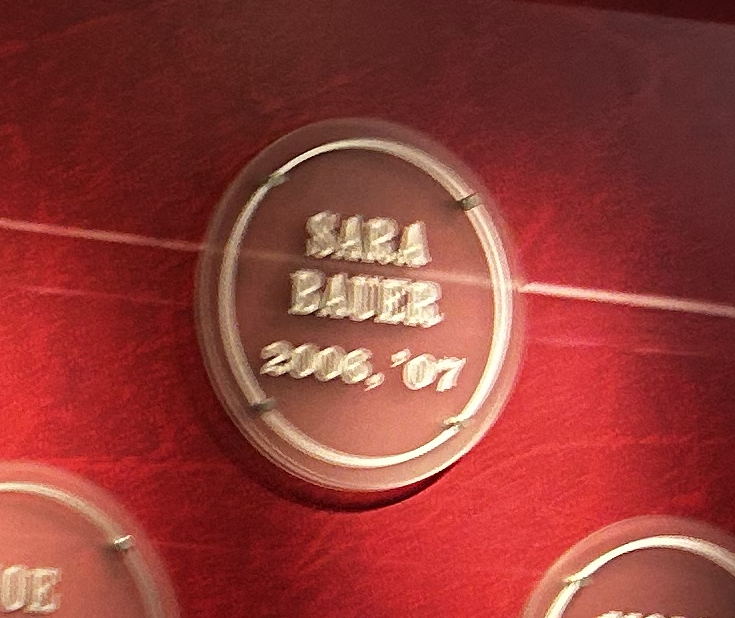
Plaque at LaBahn Arena recognizing Bauer as one of the All-American recognized alumni of the Wisconsin Badgers women's ice hockey team

Bauer was the 2007 WCHA Player of the Year and its scoring champion. In 2006, Bauer helped lead Wisconsin to a national title. During the 2006–07, Bauer registered at least a point in 28 of the team's games.

== Career stats ==
=== Wisconsin ===
Season	Games Played	Goals	Assists	Points	Power Play Goals	Short Handed Goals
2003–04	34	8	25	33	1	0
2004–05	38	26	29	55	4	2
2005–06	39	22	36	58	6	3
2006–07	41	24	48	72	7	3
Career	152	80	138	218	18	8

== Awards and honours ==
- 2006 Patty Kazmaier Award winner
- NCAA Women's Frozen Four Most Outstanding Player (2007)
- Finalist, 2007 Patty Kazmaier Award
- WCHA Top 10 Players of the Decade (2000’s)

=== Sara Bauer Academy ===
Bauer started her own hockey academy, training young males and female athletes. Her program is based out of St. Catharines, Ontario.

Awards and achievements
Preceded by Krissy Wendell	Patty Kazmaier Award; 2005–06	Succeeded by Julie Chu
