= Annie Pankowski =

American ice hockey forward

- Born: November 4, 1994 (age 31) Laguna Hills, California
- Height: 5 ft 9 in (175 cm)
- Weight: 165 lb (75 kg; 11 st 11 lb)
- Position: Forward
- Shot: Right
- Played for: Wisconsin Badgers; PWHPA Minnesota
- National team: United States
- Playing career: 2014–2022
Medal record
World Championships
Gold medal – first place	2015 Sweden
Gold medal – first place	2016 Canada
Gold medal – first place	2019 Finland

Annie Pankowski (born November 4, 1994) is an American women's ice hockey player with the PWHPA and the United States women's national ice hockey team. She was the first California born and trained player to make the United States women's national under-18 ice hockey team.

== Playing career ==
Across 154 NCAA games, Pankowski put up 206 points. She took leave for the 2017-18 season to train with the American Olympic team. She was a Patty Kazmaier Award finalist three years in a row from 2016 to 2019.

She was drafted 1st overall by the Metropolitan Riveters in the 2018 NWHL Draft, but has yet to make an appearance for the club. In May 2019, she joined the PWHPA, after the collapse of the CWHL. She took part in the 2020 ECHL All-Star Classic and the 2020 NHL All-Star Game.

=== International ===
Pankowski attended North American Hockey Academy and was a member of the United States U18 National Team. In 2013, she was a member of the US national team during their Bring on the World Tour. She logged one point in three games played.

She tried out for the 2014 US Olympic Team, but was a final cut, and was again cut from the American roster a few weeks before the 2018 Winter Olympics, despite assurances that the roster had been set.

Pankowski was one of six Badgers named to the United States roster competing at the 2015 IIHF Women's World Championship in Malmö, Sweden. She also competed in the 2016 and 2019 IIHF World Championships. She won gold with the US at the 2018 4 Nations Cup.

== Personal life ==
With Badgers teammate Lauren Williams, the two volunteered with Occupaws, an organization that trains guide dogs for the visually impaired in Wisconsin and bordering states. She graduated in 2023 from the Doctor of Veterinary Medicine program at University of Wisconsin-Madison School of Veterinary Medicine. She is currently a rotating intern with hopes to complete a surgical residency.

Her sister, Ali Pankowski, competes for the Princeton Tigers women's ice hockey program. Both her parents are veterinarians.

== Awards and honours ==
- 2019 NCAA All-Tournament Team
- Hockey Humanitarian Award finalist, 2019
- Patty Kazmaier Award top-3 finalist, 2019
- 2016-17 AHCA-CCM Women's University Division I Second Team All-American
- 2015 ALL-WCHA Second Team
- 2015 Women's Hockey Commissioners Association National Rookie of the Year
- 2015 WCHA All-Rookie Team
- WCHA Rookie of the Week (October 1, 2014)
- WCHA Rookie of the Week (Week of November 18, 2014)
- WCHA Rookie of the Week (November 27, 2014)
- WCHA Rookie of the Week (January 27, 2015)
