= Wisconsin Badgers women's ice hockey =

Women's ice hockey team of the University of Wisconsin–Madison

- Current season
- University: University of Wisconsin–Madison
- Conference: WCHA
- Athletic director: Shawn Eichorst
- Head coach: Mark Johnson; 24th season, 702–124–57 (.827)
- Arena: LaBahn Arena; Madison, Wisconsin
- Colors: Cardinal and white
- Fight song: On, Wisconsin!

NCAA tournament champions
- 2006, 2007, 2009, 2011, 2019, 2021, 2023, 2025, 2026

NCAA tournament runner-up
- 2008, 2012, 2017, 2024

NCAA tournament Frozen Four
- 2006, 2007, 2008, 2009, 2011, 2012, 2014, 2015, 2016, 2017, 2018, 2019, 2021, 2023, 2024, 2025, 2026

NCAA tournament appearances
- 2005, 2006, 2007, 2008, 2009, 2011, 2012, 2014, 2015, 2016, 2017, 2018, 2019, 2021, 2022, 2023, 2024, 2025, 2026

Conference tournament champions
- 2006, 2007, 2009, 2011, 2015, 2016, 2017, 2019, 2021, 2024, 2025

Conference regular season champions
- 2006, 2007, 2011, 2012, 2016, 2017, 2018, 2020, 2021, 2025, 2026

The Wisconsin Badgers women's ice hockey team is the hockey team that represents the University of Wisconsin in Madison, Wisconsin.

== History ==
On October 8, 1999, the Minnesota Duluth Bulldogs played the Wisconsin Badgers in the first ever Women's WCHA conference game at the Kohl Center in Madison, Wisconsin. It was the highest attended game of the season (3,892) and resulted in an 8–1 defeat of the Badgers.

In 2006, the Wisconsin Badgers became the first team outside the state of Minnesota to win the Women's Frozen Four championship. The Badgers defeated the defending champions, the Minnesota Golden Gophers, by 3–0 at Mariucci Arena in Minneapolis, Minnesota.

On January 28, 2012, the Wisconsin Badgers broke the NCAA women's hockey attendance record for the third consecutive year with 12,402 fans in attendance. The game was part of a two-game sweep of the Bemidji State Beavers. The previous record for most fans to watch a women's college hockey game at the Kohl Center was 10,668. That record was set on January 29, 2011.

On November 6, 2016, Ann-Renee Desbiens achieved career shutout number 44, breaking Noora Raty’s record for most NCAA career shutouts.

An 8–2 win on December 4, 2016, against their rivals, the Minnesota Golden Gophers resulted in a career milestone. Playing in front of a sellout crowd at Labahn Arena, Sarah Nurse scored a hat trick, becoming the first player in program history to score a hat trick against Minnesota. It marked the first time that Wisconsin scored eight goals in a game since October 11, 2015, against Ohio State, as five different Badgers scored at least one goal.

On January 14, 2017, Wisconsin once again broke its own NCAA women's hockey single-game attendance record of 13,573 which was set in 2014. The Badgers defeated St. Cloud State 2–0 at their Fill the Bowl event in front of a crowd of 15,359.

Appearing in the 2021 NCAA National Collegiate Women's Ice Hockey Tournament versus the Northeastern Huskies, Daryl Watts scored the game-winning goal in a 2–1 overtime win. With the win, the program captured its sixth national championship, all with Mark Johnson as head coach.

On March 19, 2023, the Badgers became the lowest seed to win an NCAA women's hockey tournament as Wisconsin knocked off top-seeded Ohio State, 1–0, to claim the program's record-breaking seventh NCAA title at AMSOIL Arena in Duluth, Minn. Kirsten Simms scored the lone goal of the game assisted by Claire Enright and Cami Kronish stopped all 31 shots she faced en route to being named the Most Outstanding Performer of the Tournament. UW also defeated the No. 2 seed, Minnesota, and the No. 3 seed, Colgate, on the way to its third NCAA title in five years.

On October 13, 2023, head coach Mark Johnson earned his 600th win with the Badgers. In a 9–0 win versus the MSU Mavericks, seven different Badgers, Kirsten Simms and Marianne Picard (two goals each), Caroline Harvey, Lacey Eden, Britta Curl, Casey O'Brien and Katie Kotlowski, scored goals. Ava McNaughton recorded 12 saves for her first career shutout as Johnson became the first coach to achieve 600 wins in NCAA women's ice hockey.

On March 23, 2025, the Badgers defeated the Ohio State Buckeyes in the NCAA championship game at Ridder Arena in Minneapolis, Minnesota. Trailing 1–0 in the first period and 3–1 in the second, the badgers tied the game with 18.9 seconds in the third period thanks to a Kirstin Simms penalty shot. The penalty shot was awarded due to an Ohio State player closing her hand around the puck in the goal crease, and infraction uncovered after a video review that Laila Edwards advocated for to the Badger coaching staff. In overtime, a rebound from a shot by Lacey Eden found Simms, who scored to give the Badgers the win and an NCAA record eighth title.

On November 30, 2025, the Badgers won the Smashville Women's Collegiate Hockey Showcase in Nashville, Tennessee, claiming the Guitar Trophy. Defeating the Stonehill Skyhawks by a 17–2 score. Of note, the 17 goals, scored by 11 different skaters, represents a Badgers single game record. Four goals were scored in the first period, followed by nine goals in the second period. During the second, McKayla Zilisch recorded a hat trick. The third period included another four goals, resulting in 87 shots on net. At least 15 Badgers logged one point, while Kristen Simms also contributed a hat trick. The previous program record was 16 goals scored against Lindenwood on September 29, 2023, resulting in four goals by Cassie Hall and hat tricks by Lacey Eden and Sophie Helgeson.

== Season-by-season results ==
| Won championship | Lost championship | Conference champions | League leader |

| Year | Coach | W | L | T | Conference | Conf. W | Conf. L | Conf. T | Finish | Conference Tournament | NCAA Tournament |
| 1999-00 | Julie Sasner | 19 | 14 | 2 | WCHA | 15 | 8 | 1 | 3rd WCHA | Won Quarterfinals vs. Bemidji State (9–2); Lost Semifinals vs. Minnesota (0–5) | Did not qualify |
| 2000–01 | Trina Bourget | 21 | 9 | 5 | WCHA | 13 | 6 | 5 | 3rd WCHA | Won Quarterfinals vs. Bemidji State (5–2); Lost Semifinals vs. Minnesota-Duluth (5–6) | Did not qualify |
| 2001–02 | Trina Bourget | 22 | 11 | 2 | WCHA | 17 | 6 | 1 | 3rd WCHA | Won Semifinals vs. Minnesota-Duluth (4–1); Lost Championship vs. Minnesota (2–3) | Did not qualify |
| 2002–03 | Mark Johnson | 22 | 8 | 5 | WCHA | 14 | 6 | 4 | 3rd WCHA | Lost Semifinals vs. Minnesota (1–3) | Did not qualify |
| 2003–04 | Mark Johnson | 25 | 6 | 3 | WCHA | 18 | 5 | 1 | 2nd WCHA | Lost Semifinals vs. Minnesota-Duluth (1–3) | Did not qualify |
| 2004–05 | Mark Johnson | 28 | 9 | 1 | WCHA | 20 | 7 | 1 | 3rd WCHA | Won Quarterfinals vs. St. Cloud State (3–1); Won Semifinals vs. Minnesota-Duluth (3–2 OT); Lost Championship vs. Minnesota (2–3 OT) | Lost First Round vs. Dartmouth (3–4) |
| 2005–06 | Mark Johnson | 36 | 4 | 1 | WCHA | 24 | 3 | 1 | 1st WCHA | Won Quarterfinals vs. North Dakota (4–1, 6–0); Won Semifinals vs. St. Cloud State (9–0); Won Championship vs. Minnesota (4–1) | Won First Round vs. Mercyhurst (2–1 2OT); Won Frozen Four vs. St. Lawrence (1–0); Won Championship vs. Minnesota (3–0) |
| 2006–07 | Mark Johnson | 36 | 1 | 4 | WCHA | 23 | 1 | 4 | 1st WCHA | Won Quarterfinals vs. North Dakota (4–0, 3–0); Won Semifinals vs. Ohio State (4–0); Won Championship vs. Minnesota (3–1) | Won First Round vs. Harvard (1–0 4OT); Won Frozen Four vs. St. Lawrence (4–0); Won Championship vs. Minnesota-Duluth (4–1) |
| 2007–08 | Mark Johnson | 29 | 9 | 3 | WCHA | 20 | 5 | 3 | 3rd WCHA | Won Quarterfinalsvs. Minnesota State (4–2, 5–0); Won Semifinals vs. Minnesota (4–3); Lost Championship vs. Minnesota-Duluth (4–5 OT) | Won First Round vs. Minnesota (3–2 OT); Won Frozen Four vs. Harvard (4–1); Lost Championship vs. Minnesota-Duluth (0–4) |
| 2008–09 | Mark Johnson | 34 | 2 | 5 | WCHA | 21 | 2 | 5 | 2nd WCHA | Won Quarterfinals vs. Ohio State (7–0, 4–1); Won Semifinals vs. Minnesota-Duluth (3–1); Won Championship vs. Minnesota (5–3) | Won First Round vs. Dartmouth (7–0); Won Frozen Four vs. Minnesota-Duluth (5–1); Won Championship vs. Mercyhurst (5–0) |
| 2009–10 | Tracey DeKeyser* | 18 | 15 | 3 | WCHA | 15 | 12 | 1 | 4th WCHA | Lost Quarterfinals vs. Ohio State (2–3 OT, 3–4 OT) | Did not qualify |
| 2010–11 | Mark Johnson | 37 | 2 | 2 | WCHA | 24 | 2 | 2 | 1st WCHA | Won Quarterfinals vs. St. Cloud State (9–3, 5–1); Won Semifinals vs. North Dakota (3–0); Won Championship vs. Minnesota (5–4 OT) | Won First Round vs. Minnesota-Duluth (2–1); Won Frozen Four vs. Boston College (3–2); Won Championship vs. Boston University (4–1) |
| 2011–12 | Mark Johnson | 33 | 5 | 2 | WCHA | 23 | 3 | 2 | 1st WCHA | Won Quarterfinals vs. Minnesota State (7–0, 4–0); Lost Semifinals vs. Minnesota-Duluth (1–3) | Won First Round vs. Mercyhurst (3–1); Won Frozen Four vs. Boston College (6–2); Lost Championship vs. Minnesota (2–4) |
| 2012–13 | Mark Johnson | 23 | 10 | 2 | WCHA | 17 | 9 | 2 | 3rd WCHA | Won Quarterfinals vs. St. Cloud State (5–0, 4–1); Lost Semifinals vs. North Dakota (1–2) | Did not qualify |
| 2013–14 | Mark Johnson | 28 | 8 | 2 | WCHA | 21 | 5 | 2 | 2nd WCHA | Won Quarterfinals vs. Minnesota State (4–0. 0–3, 2–0); Lost Semifinals vs. North Dakota (0–1) | Won First Round vs. Harvard (2–1); Lost Frozen Four vs. Minnesota (3–5) |
| 2014–15 | Mark Johnson | 29 | 7 | 4 | WCHA | 19 | 6 | 3 | 2nd WCHA | Won Quarterfinals vs. St. Cloud State (5–1, 4–1); Won Semifinals vs. North Dakota (4–1); Won Championship vs. Bemidji State (4–0) | Won First Round vs. Boston University (5–1); Lost Frozen Four vs. Minnesota (1–3) |
| 2015–16 | Mark Johnson | 35 | 4 | 1 | WCHA | 24 | 3 | 1 | 1st WCHA | Won Quarterfinals vs. Minnesota State (4–0, 6–0); Won Semifinals vs. Minnesota-Duluth (5–0); Won Championship vs. Minnesota(1–0) | Won First Round vs. Mercyhurst (6–0); Lost Frozen Four vs. Minnesota 2–3(OT) |
| 2016–17 | Mark Johnson | 33 | 3 | 4 | WCHA | 22 | 2 | 4 | 1st WCHA | Won Quarterfinals vs. Minnesota State (7–0, 6–0); Won Semifinals vs. North Dakota (2–1); Won Championship vs. Minnesota-Duluth (4–1) | Won First Round vs. Robert Morris(7–0); Won Frozen Four vs. Boston College (1–0); Lost Championship vs. Clarkson (0–3) |
| 2017–18 | Mark Johnson | 31 | 5 | 2 | WCHA | 20 | 2 | 2 | 1st WCHA | First Round Bye; Won Semifinals vs. Bemidji State (4–1); Lost Championship vs. Minnesota (1–3) | Won First Round vs. Minnesota (4–0); Lost Frozen Four vs. Colgate (3–4 2OT) |
| 2018–19 | Mark Johnson | 35 | 4 | 2 | WCHA | 18 | 4 | 2 | 2nd WCHA | Won Quarterfinals vs. St. Cloud State (5–0, 8–0); Won Semifinals vs. Ohio State (3–2); Won Championship vs. Minnesota (3–1) | Won First Round vs. Syracuse (4–0); Won Frozen Four vs. Clarkson (5–0); Won Championship vs. Minnesota (2–0) |
| 2019–20 | Mark Johnson | 28 | 5 | 3 | WCHA | 17 | 4 | 3 | 1st WCHA | First Round Bye; Won Semifinals vs. Minnesota-Duluth (4–1); Lost Championship to Ohio State (1–0 OT) | 2020 TOURNAMENT CANCELED; DUE TO COVID-19 pandemic |
| 2020–21 | Mark Johnson | 17 | 3 | 1 | WCHA | 12 | 3 | 1 | 1st WCHA | First Round Bye; Won Semifinals vs. Minnesota (5–3); Won Championship vs. Ohio State (3–2 OT) | Won First Round vs. Providence (3–0); Won Frozen Four vs. Ohio State (4–2); Won Championship vs. Northeastern (2–1 OT) |
| 2021–22 | Mark Johnson | 26 | 8 | 4 | WCHA | 18 | 6 | 3 | 3rd WCHA | Won Quarterfinals vs. Bemidji State (2–1, 5–0); Lost Semifinals vs. Ohio State (1–2) | Won First Round vs. Clarkson (3–1); Lost Quarterfinals vs. Northeastern (2–4) |
| 2022–23 | Mark Johnson | 29 | 10 | 2 | WCHA | 19 | 7 | 2 | 3rd WCHA | Won Quarterfinals vs. Minnesota State (3–0, 4–1); Lost Semifinals vs. Minnesota (2–4) | Won First Round vs. LIU (9–1); Won Quarterfinals vs. Colgate (4–2); Won Semifinals vs. Minnesota (3–2 OT); Won Championship vs. Ohio State (1–0) |
| 2023–24 | Mark Johnson | 35 | 6 | 0 | WCHA | 23 | 5 | 0 | 2nd WCHA | Won Quarterfinals vs. St. Thomas (4–2, 9–1); Won Semifinals vs. Minnesota (4–3 OT); Won Championship vs. Ohio State (6–3) | Won Quarterfinals vs. St. Lawrence (4–0); Won Semifinals vs. Colgate (3–1); Lost Championship vs. Ohio State (0–1) |
| 2024–25 | Mark Johnson | 38 | 1 | 2 | WCHA | 25 | 1 | 2 | 1st WCHA | Won Quarterfinals vs. Bemidji State (3–0, 11–0); Won Semifinals vs. UMD (3–1); Won Championship vs. Minnesota (4–3) | Won Quarterfinals vs. Clarkson (4–1); Won Semifinals vs. Minnesota (6–2); Won Championship vs. Ohio State (4–3 OT) |
| 2025–26 | Mark Johnson | 35 | 4 | 2 | WCHA | 23 | 3 | 2 | 1st WCHA | Won Quarterfinals vs. Bemidji State (7–0, 3–2 OT); Won Semifinals vs. Minnesota State (7–2); Lost Championship vs. Ohio State (1–2) | Won Quarterfinals vs. Quinnipiac (6–0); Won Semifinals vs. Penn State (4–3 OT); Won Championship vs. Ohio State (3–2) |

* Johnson took a one-year leave to coach the 2010 US Women's Olympic team.

== Frozen Four ==
Wisconsin appeared in the Frozen Four championship in the following years:

| Year | Champion | Score | Runner-up | City | Arena |
|---|---|---|---|---|---|
| 2006 | Wisconsin | 3–0 | Minnesota | Minneapolis, MN | Mariucci Arena |
| 2007 | Wisconsin | 4–1 | Minnesota-Duluth | Lake Placid, NY | Herb Brooks Arena |
| 2008 | Minnesota-Duluth | 4–0 | Wisconsin | Duluth, MN | DECC |
| 2009 | Wisconsin | 5–0 | Mercyhurst | Boston, MA | Agganis Arena |
| 2011 | Wisconsin | 4–1 | Boston University | Erie, PA | Tullio Arena |
| 2012 | Minnesota | 4–2 | Wisconsin | Duluth, MN | DECC |
| 2017 | Clarkson | 3–0 | Wisconsin | St. Charles, MO | Family Arena |
| 2019 | Wisconsin | 2–0 | Minnesota | Hamden, CT | People's United Center |
| 2021 | Wisconsin | 2–1 ^{(OT)} | Northeastern | Erie, PA | Erie Insurance Arena |
| 2023 | Wisconsin | 1–0 | Ohio State | Duluth, MN | AMSOIL Arena |
| 2024 | Ohio State | 1–0 | Wisconsin | Durham, NH | Whittemore Center Arena |
| 2025 | Wisconsin | 4–3 ^{(OT)} | Ohio State | Minneapolis, MN | Ridder Arena |
| 2026 | Wisconsin | 3–2 | Ohio State | State College, PA | Pegula Ice Arena |

Frozen Four Most Outstanding Player

- Sara Bauer (2007)
- Kristen Campbell (2019)
- Meghan Duggan (2011) (Co-MOP)
- Hilary Knight (2011) (Co-MOP)
- Cami Kronish (2023)
- Ava McNaughton (2026)
- Kirsten Simms (2025)
- Jessie Vetter (2006, 2009)
- Makenna Webster (2021)

Frozen Four All-Tournament Team

- Brooke Ammerman (2011, 2012)
- Sara Bauer (2007)
- Kristen Campbell (2019)
- Jesse Compher (2023)
- Meghan Duggan (2011)
- Laila Edwards (2023, 2025, 2026)
- Caroline Harvey (2023, 2024, 2025, 2026)
- Alev Kelter (2011)
- Hilary Knight (2009, 2011)
- Cami Kronish (2023)
- Erika Lawler (2008, 2009)
- Alycia Matthews (2009)
- Ava McNaughton (2025,2026)
- Meaghan Mikkelson (2007)
- Annie Pankowski (2019)
- Caroline Prevost (2011, 2012)
- Maddie Rolfes (2019)
- Abby Roque (2019)
- Caitlyn Schneider (2021)
- Kirsten Simms (2023, 2024, 2025, 2026)
- Bobbi-Jo Slusar (2006, 2007)
- Mekenzie Steffen (2019)
- Jessie Vetter (2006, 2007, 2009)
- Makenna Webster (2021)
- Malee Windmeier (2009)
- Jinelle Zaugg (2006, 2007)

== Current roster ==
As of September 28, 2025.

| No. | Nat. | Player | Class | Pos | Height | DoB | Hometown | Previous team |
|---|---|---|---|---|---|---|---|---|
| 1 | | Rhyah Stewart | Freshman | G | 5' 8" (1.73 m) | 2006-11-23 | Antigonish, Nova Scotia | West Kent Steamers |
| 2 | | Finley McCarthy | Sophomore | F | 5' 9" (1.75 m) | 2005-12-09 | Whitefish, Montana | Bishop Kearney Selects |
| 3 | | Mackenzie Jones | Freshman | D | 5' 11" (1.8 m) | 2007-01-18 | Andover, Minnesota | Andover High School |
| 4 | | Caroline Harvey (C) | Senior | D | 5' 8" (1.73 m) | 2002-10-14 | Salem, New Hampshire | North American Hockey Academy |
| 5 | | Rachel Gorbatenko | Freshman | D | 5' 11" (1.8 m) | 2007-03-07 | Barrington, Illinois | Chicago Mission |
| 6 | | Lacey Eden (A) | Graduate | F | 5' 8" (1.73 m) | 2002-05-02 | Annapolis, Maryland | Shattuck-Saint Mary's |
| 7 | | Kelly Gorbatenko (A) | Junior | F | 5' 11" (1.8 m) | 2004-08-05 | Barrington, Illinois | Chicago Mission |
| 8 | | Hannah Halverson | Sophomore | F | 5' 6" (1.68 m) | 2005-10-25 | Edina, Minnesota | Edina High School |
| 9 | | Ava Murphy | Junior | D | 5' 9" (1.75 m) | 2005-04-15 | Kitchener, Ontario | Oakville Hornets |
| 10 | | Laila Edwards (A) | Senior | F | 6' 1" (1.85 m) | 2004-01-25 | Cleveland Heights, Ohio | Selects Academy |
| 11 | | Cassie Hall | Junior | F | 5' 6" (1.68 m) | 2005-10-18 | South Lyon, Michigan | Little Caesars |
| 12 | | McKayla Zilisch | Senior | F | 5' 7" (1.7 m) | 2004-04-26 | Appleton, Wisconsin | Bemidji State |
| 14 | | Maggie Scannell | Sophomore | F | 5' 10" (1.78 m) | 2006-03-24 | Wynantskill, New York | Shattuck-Saint Mary's |
| 15 | | Nicole Gorbatenko | Freshman | F | 5' 11" (1.8 m) | 2007-07-20 | Barrington, Illinois | Chicago Mission |
| 16 | | Claire Enright | Senior (RS) | F | 5' 5" (1.65 m) | 2004-04-16 | Farmington, Minnesota | Lakeville South High School |
| 17 | | Grace Bickett | Sophomore | D | 5' 4" (1.63 m) | 2006-05-31 | Orono, Minnesota | Orono High School |
| 18 | | Marianne Picard (A) | Graduate | F | 5' 6" (1.68 m) | 2002-11-13 | Repentigny, Quebec | Stanstead College |
| 19 | | Bella Vasseur | Junior | F | 5' 7" (1.7 m) | 2005-02-15 | Oregon, Wisconsin | Bishop Kearney Selects |
| 20 | | Vivian Jungels | Senior | D | 5' 7" (1.7 m) | 2003-10-08 | Edina, Minnesota | Edina High School |
| 21 | | Emma Venusio | Sophomore | D | 5' 6" (1.68 m) | 2006-09-21 | Toronto, Ontario | Etobicoke |
| 22 | | Laney Potter | Junior | D | 5' 11" (1.8 m) | 2004-12-05 | Cranberry Township, Pennsylvania | Philadelphia Jr. Flyers |
| 24 | | Charlotte Pieckenhagen | Freshman | F | 5' 10" (1.78 m) | 2006-01-18 | St. Catharines, Ontario | Burlington Jr. Barracudas |
| 26 | | Adéla Šapovalivová | Freshman | F | 5' 4" (1.63 m) | 2006-05-17 | Beroun, Czech Republic | MoDo |
| 27 | | Kirsten Simms | Senior | F | 5' 6" (1.68 m) | 2004-08-31 | Plymouth, Michigan | Little Caesars |
| 30 | | Ava McNaughton | Junior | G | 6' 0" (1.83 m) | 2004-10-27 | Seven Fields, Pennsylvania | Bishop Kearney Selects |
| 32 | | Chloe Baker | Senior (RS) | G | 5' 6" (1.68 m) | 2004-07-02 | Hermosa Beach, California | Chicago Mission |

== Awards and honors ==
Patty Kazmaier Award

- Sara Bauer (2006)
- Jessie Vetter (2009)
- Meghan Duggan (2011)
- Brianna Decker (2012)
- Ann-Renée Desbiens (2017)
- Casey O'Brien (2025)
- Caroline Harvey (2026)

Women's Hockey Commissioners Association National Rookie of the Year

- Annie Pankowski (2015)

Women's Hockey Commissioners Association National Goalie of the Year

- Ava McNaughton (2025)

Bob Allen Women's Hockey Player of the Year

- Jessie Vetter (2009)
- Meghan Duggan (2011)
- Hilary Knight (2014,2022,2025)
- Brianna Decker (2015)
- Abby Roque (2020)
- Caroline Harvey (2023,2026)
- Laila Edwards (2024)

USCHO D-1 Women's Player of the Year

- 2006: Sara Bauer
- 2007: Sara Bauer
- 2012: Brianna Decker
- 2016: Ann-Renee Desbiens
- 2020: Abby Roque
- 2024: Casey O'Brien
- 2025: Casey O'Brien
- 2026: Caroline Harvey

USCHO D-1 Women's Rookie of the Year

- 2015: Annie Pankowski
- 2023: Caroline Harvey (Co-Rookie of the Year)

AHCA Coach of the Year

- Mark Johnson (2006, 2007, 2009, 2011, 2025)

All-America Honors

- Sara Bauer, 1st-Team (2006, 2007)
- Grace Bowlby, 1st-Team (2021)
- Courtney Burke, 2nd-Team (2016)
- Kristen Campbell, 2nd-Team (2018, 2019)
- Brianna Decker, 1st-Team (2012), 2nd-Team (2011, 2013)
- Ann-Renee Desbiens, 1st-Team (2016, 2017)
- Meghan Duggan, 1st-Team (2011)
- Lacy Eden, 1st-Team (2026)
- Laila Edwards, 1st-Team (2025), 2nd-Team (2026)
- Molly Engstrom, 1st-Team (2005)
- Caroline Harvey, 1st-Team (2024, 2025, 2026), 2nd-Team (2023)
- Meghan Hunter, 2nd-Team (2001, 2002)
- Hilary Knight, 1st-Team (2009, 2011), 2nd-Team (2012)
- Carla MacLeod, 2nd-Team (2004, 2005)
- Meaghan Mikkelson, 1st-Team (2007)
- Sarah Nurse, 2nd-Team (2017)
- Casey O'Brien, 1st-Team (2024, 2025)
- Annie Pankowski, 1st-Team (2019), 2nd-Team (2016, 2017)
- Alex Rigsby, 1st-Team (2014), 2nd-Team (2013)
- Abby Roque, 1st-Team (2020)
- Jenny Ryan, 2nd-Team (2017)
- Kirsten Simms, 1st-Team (2024, 2025)
- Bobbi-Jo Slusar, 1st-Team (2006), 2nd-Team (2007)
- Jessie Vetter, 1st-Team (2007, 2009)
- Daryl Watts, 1st-Team (2021, 2022), 2nd-Team (2020)
- Kerry Weiland, 1st-Team (2002), 2nd-Team (2001)

=== WCHA honors ===
WCHA Player of the Year

- Sara Bauer (2006, 2007)
- Brianna Decker (2012)
- Ann-Renée Desbiens (2016)
- Meghan Duggan (2011)
- Caroline Harvey (2026)
- Hilary Knight (2009)
- Casey O'Brien (2025)
- Annie Pankowski (2019)
- Abby Roque (2020)
- Kirsten Simms (2024)
- Daryl Watts (2021)

WCHA Offensive Player of the Year

- Casey O'Brien (2025)
- Annie Pankowski (2019)
- Abby Roque (2018, 2020)
- Kirsten Simms (2024)
- Daryl Watts (2021)

WCHA Defensive Player of the Year

- Molly Engstrom (2004, 2005)
- Caroline Harvey (2024, 2025, 2026)
- Stefanie McKeough (2012)
- Meaghan Mikkelson (2007)
- Bobbi-Jo Slusar (2006)

WCHA Goaltender of the Year

- Kristen Campbell (2018, 2019)

WCHA Rookie of the Year

- Sara Bauer (2004)
- Meghan Duggan (2007)
- Caroline Harvey (2023)
- Meghan Hunter (2001)
- Annie Pankowski (2015)
- Abby Roque (2017)
- Sophie Shirley (2019)

WCHA Coach of the Year

- Mark Johnson (2003, 2006, 2007, 2009, 2011, 2012, 2016, 2019, 2021, 2025, 2026)

WCHA 20th Anniversary Team

- Sara Bauer (2003–07)
- Brianna Decker (2009–13)
- Ann-Renee Desbiens (2013–17)
- Meghan Duggan (2006–09,2010–11)
- Hilary Knight (2007–09,2010–12)
- Sarah Nurse (2013–17)
- Alex Rigsby (2010–14)
- Jessie Vetter (2005–09)

All-WCHA

- Brittany Ammerman, 2nd-Team (2014, 2015), All-Rookie (2011)
- Brooke Ammerman, 3rd-Team (2009, 2010, 2012), All-Rookie (2009)
- Sara Bauer, 1st-Team (2006, 2007), 2nd-Team (2004, 2005), All-Rookie (2004)
- Kennedy Blair, 3rd-Team (2021, 2022)
- Grace Bowlby, 1st-Team (2021), 2nd-Team (2022)
- Courtney Burke, 1st-Team (2016), 2nd-Team (2014), 3rd-Team (2015), All-Rookie (2013)
- Kristen Campbell, 1st-Team (2018, 2019)
- Emily Clark, 2nd-Team (2016), 3rd-Team (2017), All-Rookie (2015)
- Sam Cogan, All-Rookie (2016)
- Sharon Cole, 2nd-Team (2006)
- Britta Curl, 2nd-Team (2024), 3rd-Team (2021, 2023), All-Rookie (2019)
- Brianna Decker, 1st-Team (2011, 2012, 2013), All-Rookie (2010)
- Mallory Deluce, All-Rookie (2008)
- Ann-Renee Desbiens, 1st-Team (2016, 2017), 3rd-Team (2015), All-Rookie (2014)
- Christine Dufour, 3rd-Team (2007), All-Rookie (2004)
- Meghan Duggan, 1st-Team (2008, 2011), 2nd-Team (2007), 3rd-Team (2009), All-Rookie (2007)
- Lacey Eden, 1st-Team (2026), 2nd-Team (2024, 2025)
- Laila Edwards, 1st-Team (2025), 2nd-Team (2026), 3rd-Team (2024), All-Rookie (2023)
- Molly Engstrom, 1st-Team (2004, 2005)
- Mikaela Gardner, 2nd-Team (2018)
- Cassie Hall, 3rd-Team (2026), All-Rookie (2024)
- Caroline Harvey, 1st-Team (2024, 2025, 2026), 2nd-Team (2023), All-Rookie (2023)
- Brittany Haverstock, 3rd-Team (2011), All-Rookie (2009)
- Meghan Horras, 2nd-Team (2004, 2006)
- Meghan Hunter, 1st-Team (2001, 2002)
- Vivian Jungels, 3rd-Team (2026)
- Claudia Kepler, 2nd-Team (2018)
- Hilary Knight, 1st-Team (2009, 2011, 2012), All-Rookie (2008)
- Nicole LaMantia, 1st-Team (2022), 2nd-Team (2021, 2023)
- Erika Lawler, 2nd-Team (2008, 2009), 3rd-Team (2007)
- Carla MacLeod, 2nd-Team (2004, 2005)
- Jackie MacMillan, 1st-Team (2000), 2nd-Team (2002)
- Alycia Matthews, 3rd-Team (2009)
- Stefanie McKeough, 2nd-Team (2012), 3rd-Team (2010), All-Rookie (2010)
- Ava McNaughton, 2nd-Team (2025, 2026)
- Meaghan Mikkelson, 1st-Team (2007), 2nd-Team (2006)
- Ava Murphy, All-Rookie (2024)
- Sarah Nurse, 2nd-Team (2017), 3rd-Team (2016), All-Rookie (2014)
- Casey O'Brien, 1st-Team (2024, 2025), 2nd-Team (2023), 3rd-Team (2022)
- Annie Pankowski, 1st-Team (2016, 2017, 2019), 2nd-Team (2015) All-Rookie (2015)
- Sis Paulsen, 1st-Team (2000), 2nd-Team (2003)
- Brette Pettet, 3rd-Team (2021)
- Laney Potter, 3rd-Team (2025), All-Rookie (2024)
- Karen Rickard, 2nd-Team (2004)
- Alex Rigsby, 1st-Team (2014), 2nd-Team (2012, 2013), All-Rookie (2011)
- Maddie Rolfes, 2nd-Team (2019), 3rd-Team (2018)
- Abby Roque, 1st-Team (2018, 2020), 2nd-Team (2019), All-Rookie (2017)
- Jenny Ryan, 2nd-Team (2016)
- Maggie Scannell, All-Rookie (2025)
- Sophie Shaver, 2nd-Team (2018)
- Sophie Shirley, 1st-Team (2021), 2nd-Team (2019, 2020), All-Rookie (2019)
- Kirsten Simms, 1st-Team (2024, 2025), 2nd-Team (2026), All-Rookie (2023)
- Bobbi-Jo Slusar, 1st-Team (2006), 2nd-Team (2007), All-Rookie (2004)
- Mekenzie Steffen, 1st-Team (2019), 2nd-Team (2020), All-Rookie (2017)
- Karley Sylvester, 3rd-Team (2015)
- Blayre Turnbull, 1st-Team (2015), 3rd-Team (2014)
- Jessie Vetter, 1st-Team (2007, 2008, 2009)
- Daryl Watts, 1st-Team (2020, 2021, 2022)
- Makenna Webster, 3rd-Team (2022)
- Kerry Weiland, 1st-Team (2001, 2002), 2nd-Team (2000, 2003)
- Sarah Wozniewicz, All-Rookie (2022)
- Jinelle Zaugg, 2nd-Team (2007), 3rd-Team (2008), All-Rookie (2005)

WCHA All-Tournament

- Brooke Ammerman (2009)
- Kennedy Blair (2021)
- Courtney Burke (2016)
- Melissa Channell (2015)
- Emily Clark (2016, 2017)
- Sharon Cole (2005)
- Ann-Renee Desbiens (2015, 2016)
- Meghan Duggan (2011)
- Lacey Eden (2021)
- Chayla Edwards (2021)
- Lalia Edwards (2024)
- Molly Engstrom (2004)
- Jasmine Giles (2009)
- Caroline Harvey (2024, 2025, 2026)
- Meghan Horras (2006)
- Meghan Hunter (2001)
- Cyndy Kenyon (2006)
- Hilary Knight (2009)
- Erika Lawler (2008)
- Carla MacLeod (2002, 2005)
- Alycia Matthews (2009)
- Sydney McKibbon (2015, 2016, 2017)
- Ava McNaughton (2024, 2025)
- Meaghan Mikkelson (2007)
- Emily Morris (2006)
- Kelly Nash (2011)
- Sarah Nurse (2015)
- Casey O'Brien (2024, 2025)
- Annie Pankowski (2019)
- Sis Paulsen (2001, 2003)
- Geena Prough (2011)
- Maddie Rolfes (2018. 2019)
- Abby Roque (2020)
- Jenny Ryan (2017)
- Kirsten Simms (2024, 2026)
- Bobbi-Jo Slusar (2006)
- Mekenzie Steffen (2020)
- Jessie Vetter (2007, 2009)
- Daryl Watts (2021)
- Kerry Weiland (2002)
- Baylee Wellhausen (2018)
- Sarah Wozniewicz (2025)
- Jinelle Zaugg (2007)

== Career records ==
=== Career points leaders ===
| # | Name | Games | Goals | Assists | Total points | Pts/Game | Years played |
|---|---|---|---|---|---|---|---|
| 1 | Casey O'Brien | 183 | 97 | 177 | 274 | 1.50 | 2020–2025 |
| 2 | Hilary Knight | 161 | 143 | 119 | 262 | 1.62 | 2007–2012 |
| 3 | Lacey Eden | 176 | 105 | 140 | 245 | 1.39 | 2020–2026 |
| 4 | Brianna Decker | 143 | 115 | 129 | 244 | 1.71 | 2009–2013 |
| T5 | Meghan Duggan | 159 | 108 | 130 | 238 | 1.50 | 2006–2011 |
| T5 | Kirsten Simms | 150 | 100 | 138 | 238 | 1.59 | 2022–2026 |
| 7 | Sara Bauer | 152 | 80 | 138 | 218 | 1.43 | 2003–2007 |
| 8 | Brooke Ammerman | 153 | 98 | 117 | 215 | 1.41 | 2008–2012 |
| 9 | Annie Pankowski | 152 | 96 | 110 | 206 | 1.36 | 2014–2019 |
| 10 | Caroline Harvey | 144 | 54 | 147 | 201 | 1.39 | 2022-2026 |

=== Top Defensive Scorers ===
| # | Name | Games | Goals | Assists | Total points | Pts/Game | Years played |
|---|---|---|---|---|---|---|---|
| 1 | Caroline Harvey | 145 | 54 | 147 | 201 | 1.39 | 2022-2026 |
| 2 | Sis Paulsen | 136 | 42 | 88 | 130 | 0.96 | 1999–2003 |
| 3 | Kerry Weiland | 133 | 34 | 90 | 124 | 0.93 | 1999–2003 |
| 4 | Courtney Burke | 153 | 18 | 90 | 108 | 0.71 | 2012–2016 |
| 5 | Nicole LaMantia | 177 | 27 | 79 | 106 | 0.60 | 2018–2023 |

=== Career goaltending records – games played ===
| # | Name | Games | Years played |
|---|---|---|---|
| 1 | Alex Rigsby | 133 | 2010–2014 |
| 2 | Ann-Renée Desbiens | 122 | 2013–2017 |
| 3 | Jackie MacMillan | 121 | 1999–2003 |
| 4 | Jessie Vetter | 115 | 2005–2009 |
| 5 | Kristen Campbell | 109 | 2017–2020 |
| 6 | Ava McNaughton | 92 | 2023–present |
| 7 | Meghan Horras | 68 | 2002–2006 |
| 8 | Kennedy Blair | 56 | 2020–2022 |
| 9 | Christine Dufour | 53 | 2003–2007 |
| 10 | Cami Kronish | 38 | 2018–2023 |

=== Career goaltending records – wins ===
| # | Name | Wins | Years played |
|---|---|---|---|
| 1 | Alex Rigsby | 100 | 2010–2014 |
| 2 | Ann-Renée Desbiens | 99 | 2013–2017 |
| 3 | Jessie Vetter | 91 | 2005–2009 |
| 4 | Kristen Campbell | 89 | 2017–2020 |
| 5 | Ava McNaughton | 81 | 2023–present |
| 6 | Jackie MacMillan | 75 | 1999–2003 |
| 7 | Meghan Horras | 48 | 2002–2006 |
| 8 | Christine Dufour | 45 | 2003–2007 |
| 9 | Kennedy Blair | 40 | 2020–2022 |
| 10 | Jane Gervais | 24 | 2021–2024 |

=== Career goaltending records – saves ===
| # | Name | Saves | Years played |
|---|---|---|---|
| 1 | Alex Rigsby | 3,126 | 2010–2014 |
| 2 | Jackie MacMillan | 2,527 | 1999–2003 |
| 3 | Ann-Renée Desbiens | 2,295 | 2013–2017 |
| 4 | Jessie Vetter | 2,175 | 2004–2009 |
| 5 | Kristen Campbell | 1,854 | 2017–2020 |
| 6 | Ava McNaughton | 1,845 | 2023–present |
| 7 | Meghan Horras | 1,291 | 2002–2006 |
| 8 | Kennedy Blair | 1,107 | 2020–2022 |
| 9 | Christine Dufour | 907 | 2003–2007 |
| 10 | Cami Kronish | 754 | 2018–2023 |

=== Career goaltending records – shutouts ===
| # | Name | Shutouts | Years played |
|---|---|---|---|
| 1 | Ann-Renée Desbiens | 55 | 2013–2017 |
| 2 | Jessie Vetter | 39 | 2005–2009 |
| 3 | Alex Rigsby | 30 | 2010–2014 |
| 4 | Kristen Campbell | 27 | 2017–2020 |
| 5 | Ava McNaughton | 21 | 2023–present |
| 6 | Christine Dufour | 18 | 2003–2007 |
| 7 | Meghan Horras | 17 | 2002–2006 |
| 8 | Jackie MacMillan | 15 | 1999–2003 |
| 9 | Kennedy Blair | 13 | 2020–2022 |
| T10 | Jane Gervais | 8 | 2021–2024 |
| T10 | Cami Kronish | 8 | 2020–2023 |

== Badgers in professional hockey ==
| = CWHL All-Star | = PHF All-Star | = Clarkson Cup Champion | = Isobel Cup Champion | = Walter Cup Champion |

| Player | Position | Team(s) | League(s) | Years | Championship(s) |
|---|---|---|---|---|---|
| Jordan Brickner | Forward | Ladies Team Lugano | Swiss National League | 2013–14 | |
| Jordan Brickner | Forward | DEC Salzburg Eagles | DEBL | 2014–15 | |
| Jordan Brickner | Forward | Connecticut Whale | NWHL | 2015–20 | |
| Natalie Buchbinder | Defense | Minnesota Frost | PWHL | 2023-26 | |
| Kristen Campbell | Goaltender | Toronto Sceptres | PWHL | 2023-25 | |
| Kristen Campbell | Goaltender | Vancouver Goldeneyes | PWHL | 2025-26 | |
| Mellissa Channell | Forward | Toronto Furies | CWHL | 2018–19 | |
| Mellissa Channell | Forward | Minnesota Frost | PWHL | 2023–25 | 2 (2024, 2025) |
| Mellissa Channell | Forward | Vancouver Goldeneyes | PWHL | 2025-26 | |
| Emily Clark | Forward | Ottawa Charge | PWHL | 2023-26 | |
| Samantha Cogan | Forward | Toronto Sceptres | PWHL | 2023–25 | |
| Samantha Cogan | Forward | Minnesota Frost | PWHL | 2026 | |
| Jesse Compher | Forward | Toronto Sceptres | PWHL | 2023-2026 | |
| Britta Curl | Forward | Minnesota Frost | PWHL | 2024–26 | 1 (2025) |
| Brianna Decker | Forward | Boston Blades | CWHL | 2015, 2018–19 | 2 (2015 and 2019) |
| Brianna Decker | Forward | Boston Pride | PHF | 2015–17 | 1 (2016) |
| Brianna Decker | Forward | Dream Gap Tour | PWHPA | 2019–21 | |
| Ann-Renee Desbiens | Goaltender | Montreal Victoire | PWHL | 2023-26 | 1 (2026) |
| Meghan Duggan | Forward | Boston Blades | CWHL | 2011–15 | 2 (2013 and 2015) |
| Meghan Duggan | Forward | Buffalo Beauts | NWHL | 2015 | |
| Meghan Duggan | Forward | Boston Pride | PHF | 2016–17 | |
| Molly Engstrom | Forward | Brampton Thunder | CWHL | 2007–08, 2009–12 | |
| Molly Engstrom | Forward | Minnesota Whitecaps | WWHL | 2008–09 | |
| Molly Engstrom | Forward | Boston Blades | CWHL | 2012–13 | |
| Molly Engstrom | Forward | Connecticut Whale | NWHL | 2015–17 | |
| Breann Frykas | Forward | Connecticut Whale | PHF | 2015–16 | |
| Hilary Knight | Forward | Boston Blades | CWHL | 2012–15 | 2 (2013 and 2015) |
| Hilary Knight | Forward | Boston Pride | NWHL | 2015–17 | 1 (2016) |
| Hilary Knight | Forward | Canadiennes de Montreal | CWHL | 2017–19 | |
| Hilary Knight | Forward | Dream Gap Tour | PWHPA | | |
| Hilary Knight | Forward | Boston Fleet | PWHL | 2023–25 | |
| Hilary Knight | Forward | Seattle Torrent | PWHL | 2025-26 | |
| Cami Kronish | Goaltender | Boston Fleet | PWHL | 2023-24 | |
| Sophia Kunin | Forward | Minnesota Frost | PWHL | 2023-24 | |
| Erika Lawler | Forward | Boston Blades | CWHL | | |
| Meaghan Mikkelson | Forward | Calgary Inferno | CWHL | | 2 (2016 and 2019) |
| Sarah Nurse | Forward | Toronto Furies | CWHL | 2018–19 | |
| Sarah Nurse | Forward | Dream Gap Tour | PWHPA | | |
| Sarah Nurse | Forward | Toronto Sceptres | PWHL | 2023–25 | |
| Sarah Nurse | Forward | Vancouver Goldeneyes | PWHL | 2025-26 | |
| Casey O'Brien | Forward | New York Sirens | PWHL | 2025-26 | |
| Madison Packer | Forward | Metropolitan Riveters | PHF | | 1 (2018) |
| Madison Packer | Forward | New York Sirens | PWHL | 2023-24 | |
| Annie Pankowski | Forward | Dream Gap Tour | PWHPA first pick in 2018 PHF Draft | 1 | |
| Carolyne Prevost | Forward | Montreal Stars; Toronto Furies | CWHL | | 1 (2014) |
| Alex Rigsby | Goaltender | Minnesota Whitecaps; Calgary Inferno; Dream Gap Tour | Independent; CWHL; PWHPA | | 1 (2019) |
| Abby Roque | Forward | New York Sirens | PWHL | 2023-25 | |
| Abby Roque | Forward | Montreal Victoire | PWHL | | |
| Sophie Shirley | Forward | Calgary Inferno | CWHL | 2017-18 | |
| Sophie Shirley | Forward | Boston Fleet | PWHL | 2023-26 | |
| Blayre Turnbull | Forward | Calgary Inferno | CWHL | 2015–19 | 2 (2016 and 2019) |
| Blayre Turnbull | Forward | Dream Gap Tour | PWHPA | | |
| Blayre Turnbull | Forward | Toronto Sceptres | PWHL | 2023–26 | |
| Jessie Vetter | Goaltender | Minnesota Whitecaps | Independent | 1 | |
| Daryl Watts | Forward | Toronto Six | PHF | 2022-23 | 1 (2023) |
| Daryl Watts | Forward | PWHL Ottawa | PWHL | 2023-24 | |
| Daryl Watts | Forward | Toronto Sceptres | PWHL | 2024–26 | |
| Kerry Weiland | Defense | Vaughan Flames | CWHL | | |
| Anna Wilgren | Defense | Montreal Victoire | PWHL | 2024-25 | |
| Anna Wilgren | Defense | Seattle Torrent | PWHL | 2025-26 | |
| Lauren Williams | Forward | Worcester Blades | CWHL | | |
| Sarah Wozniewicz | Forward | Ottawa Charge | PWHL | 2025-26 | |
| Jinelle Zaugg | Defense | Minnesota Whitecaps | WWHL | | |

=== Badger Olympians ===
| Year | Country | Player | Result |
|---|---|---|---|
| 2006 | Canada | Carla MacLeod | Gold |
| 2006 | United States | Molly Engstrom | Bronze |
| 2010 | Canada | Carla MacLeod | Gold |
| 2010 | Canada | Meaghan Mikkelson | Gold |
| 2010 | United States | Meghan Duggan | Silver |
| 2010 | United States | Molly Engstrom | Silver |
| 2010 | United States | Hilary Knight | Silver |
| 2010 | United States | Erika Lawler | Silver |
| 2010 | United States | Jessie Vetter | Silver |
| 2010 | United States | Kerry Weiland | Silver |
| 2010 | United States | Jinelle Zaugg | Silver |
| 2014 | Canada | Meaghan Mikkelson | Gold |
| 2014 | United States | Brianna Decker | Silver |
| 2014 | United States | Meghan Duggan | Silver |
| 2014 | United States | Hilary Knight | Silver |
| 2014 | United States | Jessie Vetter | Silver |
| 2018 | Canada | Emily Clark | Silver |
| 2018 | Canada | Ann-Renée Desbiens | Silver |
| 2018 | Canada | Meaghan Mikkelson | Silver |
| 2018 | Canada | Sarah Nurse | Silver |
| 2018 | Canada | Blayre Turnbull | Silver |
| 2018 | United States | Brianna Decker | Gold |
| 2018 | United States | Meghan Duggan | Gold |
| 2018 | United States | Hilary Knight | Gold |
| 2018 | United States | Alex Rigsby | Gold |
| 2022 | Canada | Kristen Campbell | Gold |
| 2022 | Canada | Emily Clark | Gold |
| 2022 | Canada | Ann-Renée Desbiens | Gold |
| 2022 | Canada | Sarah Nurse | Gold |
| 2022 | Canada | Blayre Turnbull | Gold |
| 2022 | United States | Brianna Decker | Silver |
| 2022 | United States | Caroline Harvey | Silver |
| 2022 | United States | Hilary Knight | Silver |
| 2022 | United States | Alex Rigsby | Silver |
| 2022 | United States | Abby Roque | Silver |
| 2026 | Canada | Emily Clark | Silver |
| 2026 | Canada | Ann-Renée Desbiens | Silver |
| 2026 | Canada | Sarah Nurse | Silver |
| 2026 | Canada | Blayre Turnbull | Silver |
| 2026 | Canada | Daryl Watts | Silver |
| 2026 | Czechia | Adela Sapovalivova | 5th Place |
| 2026 | United States | Britta Curl-Salemme | Gold |
| 2026 | United States | Laila Edwards | Gold |
| 2026 | United States | Caroline Harvey | Gold |
| 2026 | United States | Hilary Knight | Gold |
| 2026 | United States | Ava McNaughton | Gold |
| 2026 | United States | Kirsten Simms | Gold |
