= List of Mercyhurst Lakers women's ice hockey seasons =

This is a list of seasons completed by the Mercyhurst University Lakers women's ice hockey team. The list documents the season-by-season records of the Lakers from 2000 to present, including conference and national post season records. The team began club play in 1999.

Mercyhurst has won 14 conference Championships; 1 GLWHA Championship, 13 CHA Championships.

== Season-by-season results ==
NCAA Champions	NCAA Frozen Four	Conference regular season champions	Conference Playoff Champions

Season	Conference	Regular Season										Conference Tournament Results	National Tournament Results
Season	Conference	Conference					Overall					Conference Tournament Results	National Tournament Results
Season	Conference	GP	W	L	T	Finish	GP	W	L	T	%	Conference Tournament Results	National Tournament Results
Michael Sisti (2000–Present)
1999–00	GLWHA	8	0	0	0	1st	29	23	6	0	.793		
2000–01	GLWHA	8	5	1	2	1st	33	14	16	3	.470	Lost Championship 2–1 (Findlay)	
2001–02	GLWHA	8	8	0	0	1st	33	24	8	1	.742	Won Championship 4–2 (Findlay)	
2002–03	CHA	6	6	0	0	1st	34	25	8	1	.750	Won Semifinal 5–0 (Wayne State); Won Championship 1–0 (Findlay)	Did not qualify
2003–04	CHA	30	26	6	4	1st	12	11	1	0	.917	Won Semifinal 4–0 (Wayne State); Won Championship 3–1 (Niagara)	Did not qualify
2004–05	CHA	12	11	0	1	1st	37	28	7	2	.917	Won Semifinal 9–1 (Quinnipiac); Won Championship 4–1 (Niagara)	Lost Quarterfinal 5–4 (3OT) (Harvard)
2005–06	CHA	12	10	0	2	1st	37	23	8	6	.742	Won Semifinal 9–0 (Robert Morris); Won Championship 6–2 (Niagara)	Lost Quarterfinal 2–1 (2OT) (Wisconsin)
2006–07	CHA	12	11	0	1	1st	37	32	2	3	.905	Won Semifinal 5–2 (Robert Morris); Won Championship 4–1 (Wayne State)	Lost Quarterfinal 3–2 (OT) (Minnesota Duluth)
2007–08	CHA	12	9	2	1	2nd CHA	37	26	8	3	.743	Won Semifinal 4–2 (Niagara); Won Championship 2–1 (OT) (Wayne State)	Lost First Quarterfinal 5–4 (Minnesota Duluth)
2008–09	CHA	16	16	0	0	1st	39	31	6	0	.838	Won Semifinal 8–2 (Niagara); Won Championship 6–1 (Wayne State)	Won Quarterfinal 3–1 (St. Lawrence); Won Semifinal 5–4 (Minnesota); Lost Championship 5–0 (Wisconsin)
2009–10	CHA	16	14	1	1	1st	36	30	3	3	.543	Won Semifinal 7–1 (Robert Morris); Won Championship 3–1 (Syracuse)	Won Quarterfinal 3–1 (Boston University); Lost Semifinal 3–2 (OT) Cornell
2010–11	CHA	16	16	0	0	1st	35	29	6	0	.543	Won Semifinal 3–1 (Robert Morris); Won Championship 5–4 (Syracuse)	Lost Quarterfinal 4–2 (Boston University)
2011–12	CHA	12	8	1	3	1st	39	28	8	3	.756	Won Semifinal 4–3 (Syracuse); Lost Championship 3–2 (Robert Morris)	Lost Quarterfinal 3–1 (Wisconsin)
2012–13	CHA	20	17	3	0	1st	37	29	7	1	.797	Won Semifinal 2–1 (Robert Morris); Won Championship 4–1 (Syracuse)	Won First Round 4–3 (OT) (Cornell); Lost semifinal 4–1 (Boston University)
2013–14	CHA	20	15	3	2	1st	37	24	9	4	.703	Won Semifinal 2–1 (Syracuse); Lost Championship 2–1 (2OT) (RIT)	Won Quarterfinal 3–2 (Cornell); Lost semifinal 5–1 (Clarkson)
2014–15	CHA	21	15	5	1	1st	35	23	9	3	.700	Lost Semifinal 4–1 (RIT)	Did not qualify
2015–16	CHA	20	14	3	3	1st	35	19	11	5	.614	Won Semifinal 4–2 (Robert Morris); Won Championship 4–3 (OT) (Syracuse)	Lost Quarterinal 6–0 (Wisconsin)
2016–17	CHA	20	11	8	1	3rd CHA	35	15	18	2	.457	Lost Semifinal 3–2 (Lindenwood)	Did not qualify
2017–18	CHA	20	13	4	3	2nd CHA	37	18	15	4	.541	Won Semifinal 3–2 (OT) (Syracuse); Won Championship 5–3 (Robert Morris)	Lost quarterfinal 2–1 (OT) (Clarkson)
2018–19	CHA	20	12	6	2	2nd CHA	34	15	14	5	.515	Lost Semifinal 3–4 (Syracuse)	Did not qualify
2019–20	CHA	20	13	4	3	1st	36	21	10	5	.653	Won Semifinal 4–1 (Penn State); Won Championship 2–1 (OT)) (Robert Morris)	Cancelled due to COVID-19 pandemic
2020–21	CHA	17	10	6	1	2nd CHA	17	10	7	1	.583	Lost Semifinal 2–3 (Robert Morris)	Did not qualify
2021–22	CHA	16	10	6	0	3rd CHA	35	21	12	2	.629	Won Semifinal 4–2 (Penn State); Lost Championship 2–3 (Syracuse)	Did not qualify
2022–23	CHA	17	12	3	2	2nd CHA	17	12	3	2	.765	Won Semifinal series 2–0 (Syracuse); Lost Championship 1–2 (OT) (Penn State)	Did not qualify
2023–24	CHA	20	14	6	0	2nd CHA	38	20	17	1	.539	Won Semifinal series 2–1 (Robert Morris); Lost Championship 0–1 (Penn State)	Did not qualify
2024–25	AHA	20	13	6	1	2nd AHA	38	20	16	2	.553	Won Semifinal series 2–1 (Syracuse); Lost Championship 1–4 (Penn State)	Did not qualify
2025–26	AHA	24	17	5	2	2nd AHA	35	21	11	3	.643	Won Semifinal series 2–0 (Lindenwood); Lost Championship (2–3) (Penn State)	Did not qualify
Totals							GP	W	L	T	%	Championships	
Regular Season							904	592	246	65	.692		
Conference Post-Season							52	38	14	–	.739	1 GLWHA Championship, 13 CHA Championships	
NCAA Post-Season							17	5	12	–	.294		
