= 2022–23 Mercyhurst Lakers women's ice hockey season =

- Conference: 2nd CHA
- Home ice: Mercyhurst Ice Center

Rankings
- USA Today/USA Hockey Magazine: Not Ranked
- USCHO.com: 22nd

Record
- Overall: 21–14–2
- Conference: 12–3–2
- Home: 11–8–1
- Road: 10–6–1
- Neutral: 0–0–0

Coaches and captains
- Head coach: Michael Sisti
- Assistant coaches: Trey Flesch; Tommaso Bucci; Michele Robillard
- Captain: Liliane Perreault
- Alternate captain(s): Vanessa Upson; Sara Boucher

The Mercyhurst Lakers made it to the 2023 CHA Championship but fell in overtime to Penn State University and did not qualify for the 2023 NCAA tournament for the third consecutive year.

This was head coach Michael Sisti's 24th season. The coaching staff saw changes as assistant coaches Beth Hanrahan and Scott Spencer both departed in the offseason. After four seasons with the Lakers, Hanrahan accepted an assistant coach position with Brown University. Spencer accepted a position as the head coach of the Shenzhen Kunlan Red Star of the WCIHL and the Chinese Women's National Team after one season with the Lakers.

Sisti added assistant coaches Trey Flesch and Tommaso Bucci, and volunteer assistant coach Michele Robillard to his coaching staff. Flesch spent four seasons as an assistant coach with the Maine Black Bears at the University of Maine and time with USA Hockey National Team Bucci and Robillard are Mercyhurst graduates. Bucci is a former member of the Lakers men's team. Robillard spent four seasons with the Lakers; serving as captain in her senior year.

With the departure of Alexa Vasko and K.K. Thiessen in the offseason, Liliane Perreault was announced as the captain for the season with Sara Boucher and Vanessa Upson as the assistant captains.

There were nine new players for the season as the roster saw a large turnover from players graduating and transferring at the end of last season.

== Departures ==
Departures from the previous season

Player	Position	Nationality	Reason
Mary Katherine Gialames	Defense	United States	Graduation
Sarah Nelles	Forward	Canada	Transfer to Brock University
Kristy Pidgeon	Forward	Canada	Graduation
Emily Pinto	Forward	Canada	Graduate Transfer to the University of New Hampshire
Alexane Rhéaume	Defense	Canada	Graduation
Jenna Silvonen	Goaltender	Finland	Joined Kiekko-Espoo
K.K. Thiessen	Defense	Canada	Graduation
Alexa Vasko	Forward	Canada	Graduation (Joined the PWHPA)
Paige Whaley	Forward	Canada	Transfer to Stonehill College
Hanna Zukow	Goaltender	Canada	Transfer to Stonehill College

== Incoming ==
Player	Position	Nationality	Notes
Jada Brenon	Goalie	United States	Graduate transfer from Holy Cross
Sami Gendron	Forward	Canada	Played with the Nepean Wildcats
Makayla Javier	Defense	United States	Assistant captain of the Philadelphia Jr. Flyers
Thea Johansson	Forward	Sweden	Member of the Swedish National Team
Riley Johnson	Forward	United States	Played two seasons with the Honeybaked U19 team
Jade Maisonneuve	Forward	Canada	Played with the Nepean Wildcats
Megan McKay	Defense	United States	Played two seasons with the Bishop Kearny Selects U19 team
Grace Romeo	Forward	United States	Finished third in goals with the Washington Pride U19 team
Frankie Sanchez	Goaltender	United States	Graduate transfer from Sacred Heart

== Standings ==
2022–23 College Hockey America standings
	Conference							Overall					
	GP	W	L	T	PTS	GF	GA	GP	W	L	T	GF	GA
#10 Penn State †*	16	14	1	1	29	78	25	38	27	9	2	140	73
Mercyhurst	16	11	3	2	24	49	25	37	21	14	2	120	80
Syracuse	16	6	9	1	13	35	57	36	10	24	2	78	118
Lindenwood	16	5	11	0	10	33	54	32	5	27	0	55	145
RIT	16	1	13	2	4	21	55	32	4	26	2	50	107
Championship: March 4, 2023 † indicates conference regular season champion; * indicates conference tournament champion Rankings: USCHO.com; updated March 19, 2023

== Roster ==
As of June 23, 2026

No.	Nat.	Player	Class	Pos	Height	DoB	Hometown	Previous team
2	(United States)	Sydney Wegner	Sophomore	F	5' 7" (1.7 m)	2002-08-19	Mount Dora, FL	Williston Northampton School
3	(United States)	Megan McKay	Junior	D	5' 10" (1.78 m)	2003-06-20	Zionsville, IN	Bishop Kearny Selects
4	(Canada)	Grace Nelles	Junior	F	5' 10" (1.78 m)	2002-01-18	St. Anns, ON	Stoney Creek Jr. Sabres
5	(United States)	Calista Rowbottom	Junior	D	5' 4" (1.63 m)	2001-07-15	Catawissa, MO	Dallas Stars Elite 19U
6	(Canada)	Sami Gendron	Freshman	R	5' 5" (1.65 m)	2004-00-00	Rockland, ON	Nepean Wildcats
7	(Canada)	Alyssa Kawa	Sophomore	F	5' 5" (1.65 m)	2003-05-17	Hamilton, ON	Stoney Creek Sabres
8	(Canada)	Jordan Mortlock	Senior	D	5' 7" (1.7 m)	2001-01-15	Medicine Hat, AB	Pursuit of Excellence
10	(United States)	Grace Romeo	Freshman	F	5' 10" (1.78 m)	2004-00-00	Gainsville, VA	Washington Pride U19
11	(United States)	Makayla Javier	Freshman	F	5' 6" (1.68 m)	2003-12-01	Abingdon, MD	Philadelphia Jr. Flyers
12	(United States)	Marielle Parks	Sophomore	F	5' 6" (1.68 m)	2002-09-16	Erie, PA	Niagara Jr Purple Eagles 19U
14	(Canada)	Sara Boucher (A)	Junior	F	5' 7" (1.7 m)	2002-05-06	Burlington, ON	Oakville Hornets
16	(United States)	Jersey Phillips	Junior	F	5' 3" (1.6 m)	2002-05-25	Orchard Park, NY	Nichols School
18	(United States)	Mary Kromer	Junior	F	5' 6" (1.68 m)	2002-05-07	Angola, NY	Stoney Creek Sabres
19	(Canada)	Jade Maisonneuve	Freshman	F	5' 4" (1.63 m)	2003-09-23	St-Isidore, ON	Nepean Wildcats
20	(Sweden)	Thea Johansson	Freshman	F	5' 7" (1.7 m)	2002-11-22	Ljungby, SWE	HV71 (SHL)
21	(United States)	Riley Johnson	Freshman	F	5' 4" (1.63 m)	2003-07-33	Farmington, MI	Honeybaked
22	(United States)	Alexandria Weiss	Senior	D	5' 6" (1.68 m)	2001-06-19	Plover, WI	Bishop Kearney Selects
23	(Canada)	Aubrey Cole	Senior	D	5' 11" (1.8 m)	2001-07-22	Sarnia, ON	Bluewater Jr. Hawks
24	(Canada)	Vanessa Upson (A)	Sophomore	F	5' 5" (1.65 m)	2003-11-18	Stoney Creek, ON	Stoney Creek Sabres
25	(Canada)	Sydney Pedersen	Sophomore	D	5' 8" (1.73 m)	2003-10-30	Milestone, SK	Regina Rebels
26	(Canada)	Chantal Ste-Croix	Junior	F	5' 4" (1.63 m)	2002-06-02	Brampton, ON	Cardinal Leger Secondary School
27	(Canada)	Mary Sweetapple	Sophomore	D	5' 8" (1.73 m)	2003-05-06	Centre Burlington, NS	Ridley College
28	(Canada)	Kylee Mahoney	Sophomore	F	5' 7" (1.7 m)	2003-05-25	Niagara Falls, ON	Niagara Rapids
29	(United States)	Frankie Sanchez	Graduate	G	5' 6" (1.68 m)	2000-00-00	Elsinore, CA	Sacred Heart (NCAA)
31	(Norway)	Ena Nystrøm	Senior	G	5' 10" (1.78 m)	2000-04-28	Stavanger, Norway	RPI Engineers (NCAA)
34	(United States)	Liliane Perreault (C)	Graduate	F	5' 7" (1.7 m)	2000-03-16	Hinsdale, IL	Chicago Mission

== Schedule ==
Date	Time	Opponent^{#}	Rank^{#}	Site	Decision	Result	Attendance	Record	Ref
Regular Season
September 23	6:00 pm	Saint Anselm*	#23	Mercyhurst Ice Center • Erie, PA	Nystrøm	W 3–0	478	1–0–0 (0–0–0)	
September 24	2:00 pm	Saint Anselm*	#23	Mercyhurst Ice Center • Erie, PA	Brenon	W 9–0	696	2–0–0 (0–0–0)	
September 30	6:00 pm	#6 Colgate*	#20	Mercyhurst Ice Center • Erie, PA	Nystrøm	L 0–5	612	2–1–0 (0–0–0)	
October 1	2:00 pm	#6 Colgate*	#20	Mercyhurst Ice Center • Erie, PA	Nystrøm	L 0–2	664	2–2–0 (0–0–0)	
October 7	6:00 pm	#11 Clarkson*	#20	Mercyhurst Ice Center • Erie, PA	Brenon	L 1–3	472	2–3–0 (0–0–0)	
October 8	2:00 pm	#11 Clarkson*	#20	Mercyhurst Ice Center • Erie, PA	Brenon	W 2–1 ^{OT}	629	3–3–0 (0–0–0)	
October 14	3:00 pm	at RPI*	#17	Houston Field House • Troy, NY	Brenon	W 2–0	80	4–3–0 (0–0–0)	
October 15	2:00 pm	at RPI*	#17	Houston Field House • Troy, NY	Nystrøm	W 4–1	100	5–3–0 (0–0–0)	
October 21	6:00 pm	at #8 Cornell*	#18	Lynah Rink • Ithaca, NY	Nystrøm	L 0–3	184	5–4–0 (0–0–0)	
October 22	3:00 pm	at #8 Cornell*	#18	Lynah Rink • Ithaca, NY	Brenon	L 2–7	250	5–5–0 (0–0–0)	
November 4	3:00 pm	at #12 Penn State	#18	Pegula Ice Arena • University Park, PA	Nystrøm	L 1–4	476	5–6–0 (0–1–0)	
November 5	1:00 pm	at #12 Penn State	#18	Pegula Ice Arena • University Park, PA	Nystrøm	W 3–1	582	6–6–0 (1–1–0)	
November 22	6:00 pm	St. Lawrence*		Mercyhurst Ice Center • Erie, PA	Nystrøm	W 6–4	–	7–6–0 (1–1–0)	
November 23	2:00 pm	St. Lawrence*		Mercyhurst Ice Center • Erie, PA	Brenon	L 2–5	200	7–7–0 (1–1–0)	
December 2	6:00 pm	RIT	#19	Mercyhurst Ice Center • Erie, PA	Nystrøm	W 5–1	250	8–7–0 (2–1–0)	
December 3	2:00 pm	RIT	#19	Mercyhurst Ice Center • Erie, PA	Nystrøm	W 7–1	246	9–7–0 (3–1–0)	
December 9	3:00 pm	#16 Princeton*		Mercyhurst Ice Center • Erie, PA	Nystrøm	L 5–6	–	9–8–0 (3–1–0)	
December 10	2:00 pm	#16 Princeton*		Mercyhurst Ice Center • Erie, PA	Brenon	L 1–5	436	9–9–0 (3–1–0)	
January 2	3:00 pm	at #2 Yale*		Ingalls Rink • Newhaven, CT	Nystrøm	L 1–3	482	9–10–0 (3–1–0)	
January 3	3:00 pm	at #2 Yale*		Ingalls Rink • Newhaven, CT	Nystrøm	L 0–5	213	9–11–0 (3–1–0)	
January 5	1:00 pm	at Post*		Sports Center of Connecticut • Waterbury, CT	Brenon	W 13–0	45	10–11–0 (3–1–0)	
January 6	11:30 am	at Post*		Sports Center of Connecticut • Waterbury, CT	Nystrøm	W 8–0	42	11–11–0 (3–1–0)	
January 13	7:10 pm CT	at Lindenwood		Centene Community Ice Center • Maryland Heights, MO	Nystrøm	W 4–3	297	12–11–0 (4–1–0)	
January 14	1:10 pm CT	at Lindenwood		Centene Community Ice Center • Maryland Heights, MO	Brenon	W 3–2	105	13–11–0 (5–1–0)	
January 22	5:00 pm	#12 Penn State		Mercyhurst Ice Center • Erie, PA	Nystrøm	L 2–5	333	13–12–0 (5–2–0)	
January 23	2:00 pm	#12 Penn State		Mercyhurst Ice Center • Erie, PA	Brenon	L 2–3	373	13–13–0 (5–3–0)	
January 28	1:00 pm	Syracuse		Mercyhurst Ice Center • Erie, PA	Nystrøm	W 6–1	432	14–13–0 (6–3–0)	
January 29	1:00 pm	Syracuse		Mercyhurst Ice Center • Erie, PA	Nystrøm	T 1–1	325	14–13–1 (6–3–1)	
February 3	6:00 pm	at RIT		Frank Ritter Memorial Ice Arena • Rochester, NY	Nystrøm	T 1–1	388	14–13–2 (6–3–2)	
February 4	2:00 pm	RIT		Frank Ritter Memorial Ice Arena • Rochester, NY	Nystrøm	W 3–0	443	15–13–2 (7–3–2)	
February 10	6:00 pm	at Syracuse		Tennity Ice Pavilion • Syracuse, NY	Nystrøm	W 2–0	185	16–13–2 (8–3–2)	
February 11	3:00 pm	at Syracuse		Tennity Ice Pavilion • Syracuse, NY	Nystrøm	W 4–2	204	17–13–2 (9–3–2)	
February 17	6:00 pm	Lindenwood		Mercyhurst Ice Center • Erie, PA	Brenon	W 3–0	924	18–13–2 (10–3–2)	
February 18	2:00 pm	Lindenwood		Mercyhurst Ice Center • Erie, PA	Nystrøm	W 2–0	976	19–13–2 (11–3–2)	
CHA Tournament
February 24	1:00 pm	Syracuse		Mercyhurst Ice Center (Semifinals) • Erie,PA	Nystrøm	W 5–3	624	20–13–2 (12–3–2)	
February 25	2:00 pm	Syracuse		Mercyhurst Ice Center (Semifinals) • Erie,PA	Nystrøm	W 6–0	–	21–13–2 (13–3–2)	
March 4	2:00 pm	at #10 Penn State		Pegula Ice Arena (Finals) • University Park, PA	Nystrøm	L 1–2	1,650	21–14–2 (13–4–2)	
*Non-conference game. ^{#}Rankings from USCHO.com Poll.

== Awards and honors ==
Weekly Awards
Player	Award	Date Awarded	Ref.
Jada Brenon	CHA Goalie of the Week	September 26, 2022	
Makayla Javier	CHA Defenseman of the Week	September 26, 2022	
Thea Johansson	PPG Athlete of the Week	September 27, 2022	
Jada Brenon	CHA Goalie of the Week	October 10, 2022	
Sara Boucher	CHA Forward of the Week	October 17, 2022	
Thea Johansson	CHA Rookie of the Week	November 28, 2022	
Sara Boucher	CHA Forward of the Week	December 5, 2022	
Sara Boucher	PPG Athlete of the Week	December 6, 2022	
Vanessa Upson	CHA Forward of the Week	December 12, 2022	
Jordan Mortlock	CHA Defenseman of the Week	December 12, 2022	
Thea Johansson	Rookie of the Week	December 12, 2022	
Thea Johansson	PPG Athlete of the Week	December 13, 2022	
Grace Nelles	CHA Forward of the Week	January 9, 2023	
Alexandria Weiss	CHA Defenseman of the Week	January 9, 2023	
Jada Brenon	CHA Goaltender of the Week	January 9, 2023	
Megan McKay	CHA Rookie of the Week	January 9, 2023	
Grace Nelles	PPG Athlete of the Week	January 10, 2023	
Sydney Pedersen	CHA Defenseman of the Week	January 30, 2023	
Ena Nystrøm	CHA Goaltender of the Week	January 30, 2023	
Sara Boucher	PPG Athlete of the Week	January 31, 2023	
Ena Nystrøm	CHA Goaltender of the Week	February 6, 2023	
Ena Nystrøm	PPG Athlete of the Week	February 7, 2023	
Liliane Perreault	CHA Forward of the Week	February 13, 2023	
Ena Nystrøm	CHA Goaltender of the Week	February 13, 2023	
Liliane Perreault	PPG Athlete of the Week	February 14, 2023	
Sydney Pedersen	CHA Defenseman of the Week	February 20, 2023	

Monthly Awards
Player	Award	Month	Ref.
Jada Brenon	CHA Goalie of the Month	September & October (combined)	
Thea Johansson	CHA Goaltender of the Month	November	
Sydney Pedersen	CHA Defenseman of the Month	January	
Ena Nystrøm	CHA Goaltender of the Month	February	
Ena Nystrøm	HCA Goaltender of the Month	February	

Annual Awards & Honors
Player	Award
Ena Nystrøm	First All-CHA Team
Thea Johansson	Second All-CHA Team
Sara Boucher	Second All-CHA Team
Vanessa Upson	Second All-CHA Team
Sydney Pedersen	Second All-CHA Team
Thea Johansson	CHA All-Rookie Team
Megan McKay	CHA All-Rookie Team
Ena Nystrøm	CHA Goaltender of the Year
Liliane Perreault	CHA Individual Sportsmanship Award
