= 2023–24 Mercyhurst Lakers women's ice hockey season =

- Conference: 2nd CHA
- Home ice: Mercyhurst Ice Center

Rankings
- USA Today/USA Hockey Magazine: Not Ranked
- USCHO.com: 17th

Record
- Overall: 20–17–1
- Conference: 14–6–0
- Home: 14–6–1
- Road: 6–11–1
- Neutral: 0–0–0

Coaches and captains
- Head coach: Michael Sisti
- Assistant coaches: Trey Flesch; Tommaso Bucci; Emily Ach
- Alternate captain(s): Mary Kromer; Ena Nystrøm; Vanessa Upson

The Mercyhurst Lakers made it to the 2024 CHA Championship but fell to Penn State University in the Championship Finals for the second straight season. The team did not qualify for the 2024 NCAA tournament for the fourth consecutive year.

This was head coach Michael Sisti's 25th season. Emily Ach was added to the coaching staff for the season as an assistant coach, replacing Michele Robillard. Ach is a former college ice hockey player with the St. Cloud Huskies. She was also the Director of Hockey Operations for the USA Hockey U22 team.

With the departure of Liliane Perreault in the offseason, Mary Kromer and Ena Nystrøm were named as assistant captains alongside returning assistant captain Vanessa Upson.

The Lakers, including the incoming class, travelled to Sweden for a foreign tour series in July 2023. The team played four games against the Swedish National Team and the Swedish Development Team. The team had six players on the roster from Europe; three from Sweden.

The season had strong performance from Nystrøm, Nuutinen and Pedersen. Nystrøm and Nuutinen each received four weekly CHA honors while Pedersen was named CHA Defenseman of the Week on five occasions. Nystrøm would also win CHA Goaltender of the Year for the second consecutive year.

Following the 2023–24 season, College Hockey America (CHA) merged with Atlantic Hockey Association (AHA) to form Atlantic Hockey America (AHA).

== Departures ==
Departures from the previous season

Player	Position	Nationality	Reason
Jada Brenon	Goaltender	United States	Graduation
Aubrey Cole	Defense	Canada	Graduate transfer to University of Toronto
Alyssa Kawa	Forward	Canada	Transfer to Franklin Pierce University
Jordan Mortlock	Defense	Canada	Graduation
Liliane Perreault	Forward	United States	Graduation
Jersey Phillips	Forward	United States	Transfer to Robert Morris University
Grace Romeo	Forward	United States	Transfer to William Smith College
Calista Rowbottom	Defense	United States	
Frankie Sanchez	Goaltender	United States	Graduation
Sydney Wegner	Forward	United States	
Alexandria Weiss	Defense	United States	Graduate transfer to Syracuse University

== Incoming ==
Player	Position	Nationality	Notes
Anna Barrington	Defense	Canada	Played with Brampton Canadettes
Olivia Cvar	Forward	Canada	Graduate transfer from St. Cloud State University
Clara Karunakar	Goalie	Canada	Played with Durham West Lightning
Erika Lind	Goalie	Canada	Played with Northern Alberta Extreme
Sofia Ljung	Defense	Sweden	Played with Brynäs IF of the SDHL
Henlee Mahoney	Forward	Canada	Played with Stoney Creek Sabres
Emmi Mourujärvi	Defense	Finland	Played with RoKi of the Auroraliiga
Sofia Nuutinen	Defense	Finland	Played with Kiekko-Espoo of the Auroraliiga
Sofia Skriver	Forward	Denmark	Member of the Danish National Team

== Standings ==
2023–24 College Hockey America standings
	Conference							Overall					
	GP	W	L	T	PTS	GF	GA	GP	W	L	T	GF	GA
#15 Penn State †	20	14	4	2	30	79	36	38	22	13	3	121	77
Mercyhurst	20	14	6	0	28	75	39	28	20	17	1	112	89
Robert Morris	20	11	8	1	23	60	69	35	15	19	1	94	126
RIT	20	7	12	1	15	47	59	35	13	19	3	77	89
Lindenwood	20	6	12	2	14	64	100	32	11	19	2	96	157
Syracuse	19	4	13	2	10	46	65	34	7	24	3	67	138
Championship: March 2, 2024 † indicates conference regular season champion; * indicates conference tournament champion Rankings: USCHO.com; updated March 24, 2024

== Roster ==
As of June 26, 2026

No.	Nat.	Player	Class	Pos	Height	DoB	Hometown	Previous team
1	(Canada)	Erika Lind	Freshman	G	6' 0" (1.83 m)	2005-03-17	Edmonton, AB	Northern Alberta Xtreme (CSSHL)
3	(United States)	Megan McKay	Sophomore	D	5' 10" (1.78 m)	2003-06-20	Zionsville, IN	Bishop Kearny Selects (USHS)
4	(Canada)	Grace Nelles	Senior	F	5' 10" (1.78 m)	2002-01-18	St. Anns, ON	Stoney Creek Jr. Sabres (PWHL)
6	(Canada)	Sami Gendron	Sophomore	D	5' 5" (1.65 m)	2004-00-00	Rockland, ON	Nepean Wildcats (OWHL)
8	(Sweden)	Sofia Ljung	Freshman	D	5' 7" (1.7 m)	2004-01-23	Hudiksvall,Sweden	Brynäs IF (SHL)
9	(Canada)	Olivia Cvar	Graduate	F	5' 8" (1.73 m)	2001-02-23	Stonewall, MB	St. Cloud Huskies (NCAA)
10	(Finland)	Emmi Mourujärvi	Freshman	D	5' 10" (1.78 m)	2003-03-23	Kuusamo, Finland	Kerttuli Lukio (Auroraliiga)
11	(United States)	Makayla Javier	Sophomore	F	5' 6" (1.68 m)	2003-12-01	Abingdon, MD	Philadelphia Jr. Flyers (JWHL)
12	(United States)	Marielle Parks	Junior	F	5' 6" (1.68 m)	2002-09-16	Erie, PA	Niagara Jr Purple Eagles 19U
14	(Canada)	Sara Boucher	Senior	F	5' 7" (1.7 m)	2002-05-06	Burlington, ON	Oakville Hornets
16	(Canada)	Henlee Mahoney	Freshman	F	5' 7" (1.7 m)	2005-00-00	Niagara Falls, ON	Stoney Creek Sabres (OWHL)
18	(United States)	Mary Kromer (A)	Senior	F	5' 6" (1.68 m)	2002-05-07	Angola, NY	Stoney Creek Sabres
19	(Canada)	Jade Maisonneuve	Sophomore	F	5' 4" (1.63 m)	2003-09-23	St-Isidore, ON	Nepean Wildcats (OWHL)
20	(Sweden)	Thea Johansson	Sophomore	F	5' 7" (1.7 m)	2002-11-22	Ljungby, SWE	HV71 (SDHL)
21	(United States)	Riley Johnson	Sophomore	F	5' 4" (1.63 m)	2003-07-03	Farmington, MI	Honeybaked
22	(Finland)	Sofia Nuutinen	Freshman	F	5' 7" (1.7 m)	2002-06-14	Vantaa, Finland	Finland National Team
23	(Denmark)	Sofia Skriver	Freshman	F	5' 4" (1.63 m)	2003-06-07	Silkeborg, Denmark	Lulea HF (SDHL)
24	(Canada)	Vanessa Upson (A)	Junior	F	5' 5" (1.65 m)	2003-11-18	Stoney Creek, ON	Stoney Creek Sabres (OWHL)
25	(Canada)	Sydney Pedersen	Junior	D	5' 8" (1.73 m)	2003-10-30	Milestone, SK	Regina Rebels
26	(Canada)	Chantal Ste-Croix	Senior	F	5' 4" (1.63 m)	2002-06-02	Brampton, ON	Cardinal Leger Secondary School
27	(Canada)	Mary Sweetapple	Junior	D	5' 8" (1.73 m)	2003-05-06	Centre Burlington, NS	Ridley College
28	(Canada)	Kylee Mahoney	Junior	F	5' 7" (1.7 m)	2003-05-25	Niagara Falls, ON	Niagara Rapids (OWHA)
31	(Norway)	Ena Nystrøm (A)	Graduate	G	5' 10" (1.78 m)	2000-04-28	Stavanger, Norway	RPI Engineers (NCAA)

== Schedule ==
Date	Time	Opponent^{#}	Rank^{#}	Site	Decision	Result	Attendance	Record	Ref
Foreign Tour
July 25	6:00 pm CEST	vs. Swedish National Team*		Stockholm (Foreign Tour)	–	–	–	0–0–0 (0–0–0)	
July 26	6:00 pm CEST	vs. Swedish Olympic Team*		Stockholm (Foreign Tour)	–	–	–	0–0–0 (0–0–0)	
July 28	6:00 pm CEST	vs. Swedish National Team*		Stockholm (Foreign Tour)	–	–	–	0–0–0 (0–0–0)	
July 29	5:00 pm CEST	vs. Swedish Development Team*		Stockholm (Foreign Tour)	–	–	–	0–0–0 (0–0–0)	
Regular Season
September 23	5:00 pm	Post*		Mercyhurst Ice Center • Erie, PA	Nystrøm	W 5–0	207	1–0–0 (0–0–0)	
September 24	1:00 pm	Post*		Mercyhurst Ice Center • Erie, PA	Nystrøm	W 2–0	155	2–0–0 (0–0–0)	
September 29	7:00 pm	at #RV St. Lawrence*		Appleton Arena • Canton, NY	Nystrøm	L 1–5	553	2–1–0 (0–0–0)	
September 30	3:00 pm	at #RV St. Lawrence*		Appleton Arena • Canton, NY	Nystrøm	L 5–6	520	2–2–0 (0–0–0)	
October 6	6:00 pm	#14 St. Cloud*	#RV	Mercyhurst Ice Center • Erie, PA	Nystrøm	W 2–0	220	3–2–0 (0–0–0)	
October 7	2:00 pm	#14 St. Cloud*	#RV	Mercyhurst Ice Center • Erie, PA	Nystrøm	L 0–1	135	3–3–0 (0–0–0)	
October 13	6:00 pm	at #3 Colgate*		Class of 1965 Arena • Hamilton, NY	Lind	L 0–7	1,000	3–4–0 (0–0–0)	
October 14	3:00 pm	at #3 Colgate*		Class of 1965 Arena • Hamilton, NY	Nystrøm	L 1–5	650	3–5–0 (0–0–0)	
October 20	6:00 pm	#9 Cornell*	#RV	Mercyhurst Ice Center • Erie, PA	Nystrøm	T 3–3	235	3–5–1 (0–0–0)	
October 21	2:00 pm	#9 Cornell*	#RV	Mercyhurst Ice Center • Erie, PA	Nystrøm	L 1–3	254	3–6–1 (0–0–0)	
October 27	6:00 pm	Robert Morris		Mercyhurst Ice Center • Erie, PA	Nystrøm	W 9–2	387	4–6–1 (1–0–0)	
October 28	2:00 pm	Robert Morris		Mercyhurst Ice Center • Erie, PA	Nystrøm	L 2–3	230	4–7–1 (1–1–0)	
November 3	6:00 pm	at RIT		Gene Polisseni Center • Rochester, NY	Nystrøm	W 3–1	818	5–7–1 (2–1–0)	
November 4	3:00 pm	at RIT		Gene Polisseni Center • Rochester, NY	Nystrøm	L 2–3	456	5–8–1 (2–2–0)	
November 10	3:00 pm	at #13 Princeton*		Hobey Baker Memorial Rink • Princeton, NJ	Nystrøm	L 3–4	421	5–9–1 (2–2–0)	
November 11	1:00 pm	at #13 Princeton*		Hobey Baker Memorial Rink • Princeton, NJ	Lind	L 1–5	409	5–10–1 (2–2–0)	
November 17	7:00 pm	#RV Penn State	#RV	Mercyhurst Ice Center • Erie, PA	Nystrøm	W 4–0	383	6–10–1 (3–2–0)	
November 18	2:00 pm	#RV Penn State	#RV	Mercyhurst Ice Center • Erie, PA	Nystrøm	L 1–3	276	6–11–1 (3–3–0)	
December 1	6:00 pm	at Lindenwood		Centene Community Ice Center • St. Charles, MO	Nystrøm	W 8–5	124	7–11–1 (4–3–0)	
December 2	3:00 pm	at Lindenwood		Centene Community Ice Center • St. Charles, MO	Nystrøm	W 4–1	108	8–11–1 (5–3–0)	
January 5	3:00 pm	#14 Yale*		Mercyhurst Ice Center • Erie, PA	Nystrøm	L 0–2	256	8–12–1 (5–3–0)	
January 6	2:00 pm	#14 Yale*		Mercyhurst Ice Center • Erie, PA	Nystrøm	W 2–0	489	9–12–1 (5–3–0)	
January 12	6:00 pm	Syracuse	#RV	Mercyhurst Ice Center • Erie, PA	Nystrøm	W 2–1	375	10–12–1 (6–3–0)	
January 13	1:00 pm	Syracuse	#RV	Mercyhurst Ice Center • Erie, PA	Nystrøm	W 6–2	238	11–12–1 (7–3–0)	
January 19	3:00 pm	at Robert Morris	#RV	Clearview Arena • Moon Township, PA	Nystrøm	W 6–1	209	12–12–1 (8–3–0)	
January 20	2:00 pm	at Robert Morris	#RV	Clearview Arena • Moon Township, PA	Nystrøm	L 1–2	405	12–13–1 (8–4–0)	
January 26	3:00 pm	RIT	#RV	Mercyhurst Ice Center • Erie, PA	Nystrøm	W 4–1	390	13–13–1 (9–4–0)	
January 27	1:00 pm	RIT	#RV	Mercyhurst Ice Center • Erie, PA	Nystrøm	W 5–2	407	14–13–1 (10–4–0)	
February 2	6:00 pm	at #14 Penn State		Pegula Ice Arena • University Park, PA	Nystrøm	L 0–4	849	14–14–1 (10–5–0)	
February 3	2:00 pm	at #14 Penn State		Pegula Ice Arena • University Park, PA	Nystrøm	L 2–3 ^{OT}	1,315	14–15–1 (10–6–0)	
February 9	3:00 pm	Lindenwood		Mercyhurst Ice Center • Erie, PA	Nystrøm	W 3–0	320	15–15–1 (11–6–0)	
February 10	12:00 pm	Lindenwood		Mercyhurst Ice Center • Erie, PA	Nystrøm	W 6–2	458	16–15–1 (12–6–0)	
February 16	6:00 pm	at Syracuse		Tennity Ice Pavilion • Syracuse, NY	Nystrøm	W 3–2	270	17–15–1 (13–6–0)	
February 17	3:00 pm	at Syracuse		Tennity Ice Pavilion • Syracuse, NY	Nystrøm	W 4–1	342	18–15–1 (14–6–0)	
CHA Tournament
February 23	2:00 pm	Robert Morris	#RV	Mercyhurst Ice Center (Semifinals) • Erie, PA	Nystrøm	L 0–5	151	18–16–1 (14–6–0)	
February 24	2:00 pm	Robert Morris	#RV	Mercyhurst Ice Center (Semifinals) • Erie, PA	Nystrøm	W 5–2	237	19–16–1 (14–6–0)	
February 25	2:00 pm	Robert Morris	#RV	Mercyhurst Ice Center (Semifinals) • Erie, PA	Nystrøm	W 6–1	351	20–16–1 (14–6–0)	
March 2	2:00 pm	at #14 Penn State		Pegula Ice Arena (Finals) • University Park, PA	Nystrøm	L 0–1	1,475	20–17–1 (14–6–0)	
*Non-conference game. ^{#}Rankings from USCHO.com Poll.

== Awards and honors ==
Weekly Awards
Player	Award	Date Awarded	Ref.
Sofia Nuutinen	CHA Rookie of the Week	September 25, 2023	
Sara Boucher	PPG Athlete of the Week	September 26, 2023	
Sydney Pedersen	CHA Defenseman of the Week	October 9, 2023	
Ena Nystrøm	CHA Goaltender of the Week	October 23, 2023	
Sara Boucher	CHA Forward of the Week	October 30, 2023	
Olivia Cvar	CHA Forward of the Week	November 13, 2023	
Sofia Nuutinen	CHA Rookie of the Week	November 13, 2023	
Sydney Pedersen	CHA Defenseman of the Week	November 20, 2023	
Ena Nystrøm	CHA Goaltender of the Week	November 20, 2023	
Sofia Nuutinen	PPG Athlete of the Week	December 5, 2023	
Makayla Javier	CHA Defenseman of the Week	December 5, 2023	
Sofia Nuutinen	CHA Rookie of the Week	December 5, 2023	
Vanessa Upson	CHA Forward of the Week	January 8, 2024	
Ena Nystrøm	CHA Goaltender of the Week	January 8, 2024	
Ena Nystrøm	PPG Athlete of the Week	January 9, 2024	
Megan McKay	CHA Defenseman of the Week	January 15, 2024	
Thea Johansson	PPG Athlete of the Week	January 16, 2024	
Sofia Ljung	CHA Rookie of the Week	January 22, 2024	
Olivia Cvar	PPG Athlete of the Week	January 23, 2024	
Sydney Pedersen	CHA Defenseman of the Week	January 29, 2024	
Sara Boucher	PPG Athlete of the Week	January 30, 2024	
Sydney Pedersen	CHA Defenseman of the Week	February 12, 2024	
Vanessa Upson	PPG Athlete of the Week	February 13, 2024	
Sydney Pedersen	CHA Defenseman of the Week	February 19, 2024	
Ena Nystrøm	CHA Goaltender of the Week	February 19, 2024	
Vanessa Upson	CHA Forward of the Week	February 26, 2024	
Sofia Nuutinen	CHA Rookie of the Week	February 26, 2024	

Monthly Awards
Player	Award	Month	Ref.
Thea Johansson	CHA Forward of the Month	September	
Sofia Nuutinen	CHA Rookie of the Month	September	
Sydney Pedersen	CHA Defenseman of the Month	October	
Sydney Pedersen	CHA Defenseman of the Month	November	
Sofia Nuutinen	CHA Rookie of the Month	December	
Ena Nystrøm	CHA Goaltender of the Month	January	
Vanessa Upson	CHA Forward of the Month	February	

Annual Awards & Honors
Player	Award
Sydney Pedersen	First All-CHA Team
Ena Nystrøm	First All-CHA Team
Vanessa Upson	Second All-CHA Team
Sofia Nuutinen	CHA All-Rookie Team
Sofia Ljung	CHA All-Rookie Team
Ena Nystrøm	CHA Goaltender of the Year
Sydney Pedersen	CHA Defenseman of the Year
Kylee Mahoney	CHA Best Defensive Forward of the Year
Vanessa Upson	CHA Individual Sportsmanship Award
Sofia Nuutinen	USCHO All-Rookie Team
