= 2024–25 Mercyhurst Lakers women's ice hockey season =

- Conference: 2nd AHA
- Home ice: Mercyhurst Ice Center

Rankings
- USA Today/USA Hockey Magazine: Not Ranked
- USCHO.com: Receiving Votes

Record
- Overall: 20–16–2
- Conference: 13–6–1
- Home: 13–8–1
- Road: 7–8–1
- Neutral: 0–0–0

Coaches and captains
- Head coach: Michael Sisti
- Assistant coaches: Trey Flesch; Scott Spencer; Alexandria Weiss
- Captain: Vanessa Upson
- Alternate captain(s): Mary Kromer; Megan McKay; Sydney Pedersen

The Mercyhurst Lakers made it to the 2025 AHA Championship but fell to Penn State University in the Championship Finals for the third consecutive season. The team did not qualify for the 2025 NCAA Tournament for the fifth consecutive year.

This was head coach Michael Sisti's 26th season. He signed a contract extension on September 27, 2024. At the time of the signing, Sisti had the second most wins among Division I coaches, with 570 wins.

Alexandria Weiss and Scott Spencer were added to the coaching staff as assistant coaches, joining Trey Flesch. Spencer was most recently the Head Coach of the Chinese Women's National Team and has won two gold medals with the Chinese hockey program. He was previously an assistant coach with Mercyhurst most recently in the 2021–22 season. Weiss is a former Laker defenseman who spent four years with the Lakers before transferring to Syracuse University for her final year.

Vanessa Upson, a senior, was named the captain for the season. She served as an assistant captain for the previous two seasons and was named the national rookie of the year in the 2021–2022 season. Megan McKay and Sydney Pedersen join Mary Kromer as assistant captains.

This was the first season the Lakers played in the newly formed Atlantic Hockey Association. In the preseason poll, the Lakers were voted to finish second in the AHA.

== Departures ==
Departed players from the previous season.

Player	Position	Nationality	Reason
Sara Boucher	Forward	Canada	Graduate transfer to University of New Hampshire
Olivia Cvar	Forward	Canada	Graduation
Sami Gendron	Defense	Canada	Transfer to Syracuse University
Riley Johnson	Forward	United States	Transfer to Adrian College
Grace Nelles	Forward	United States	Graduate transfer to University of Vermont
Sofia Skriver	Forward	Denmark	Joined SHL
Ena Nystrøm	Goaltender	Norway	Graduation (joined SDHL)

== Incoming ==
Player	Position	Nationality	Notes
Ashley Mandeville	Defense	United States	Played with Bishop Kearny Selects
Julia Schalin	Forward	Finland	Played with Kiekko-Espoo of Auroraliiga
Julia Perjus	Forward	Sweden	Played with MoDo Hockey of the SDHL
Regina Metzler	Forward	Hungary	Played with the Hungarian National Team
Jorden Mattison	Goaltender	Canada	Graduate transfer from University of Maine
Magdalena Luggin	Goaltender	Austria	Played with the Austrian National Team
Avery Norman	Forward	Canada	Captain of the Nepean Wildcats

== Standings ==
2024–25 Atlantic Hockey America standings
	Conference							Overall					
	GP	W	L	T	PTS	GF	GA	GP	W	L	T	GF	GA
#8 Penn State †*	20	19	1	0	52	74	24	38	31	6	1	135	59
Mercyhurst	20	13	6	1	39	64	37	39	20	17	2	109	80
Syracuse	20	11	9	0	35	53	43	37	15	22	0	83	97
RIT	20	8	10	2	27	52	48	37	16	17	4	94	92
Lindenwood	20	4	15	1	15	41	72	33	5	26	2	62	144
Robert Morris	20	2	16	2	9	23	83	35	8	24	3	60	136
Championship: March 8, 2025 † indicates conference regular season champion;* indicates conference tournament champion Rankings: USCHO.com; updated March 13, 2025

== Roster ==
As of June 28, 2026

No.	Nat.	Player	Class	Pos	Height	DoB	Hometown	Previous team
1	(Canada)	Erika Lind	Sophomore	G	6' 0" (1.83 m)	2005-03-17	Edmonton, AB	Northern Alberta Xtreme (CSSHL)
3	(United States)	Megan McKay (A)	Junior	D	5' 10" (1.78 m)	2003-06-20	Zionsville, IN	Bishop Kearny Selects (USHS)
5	(United States)	Ashley Mandeville	Freshman	D	5' 7" (1.7 m)	2005-06-27	Pascoag, RI	Bishop Kearney Selects U19
8	(Sweden)	Sofia Ljung	Sophomore	D	5' 7" (1.7 m)	2004-01-23	Hudiksvall,Sweden	Brynäs IF (SHL)
10	(Finland)	Emmi Mourujärvi	Sophomore	D	5' 10" (1.78 m)	2003-03-23	Kuusamo, Finland	Kerttuli Lukio (Auroraliiga)
11	(United States)	Makayla Javier	Junior	F	5' 6" (1.68 m)	2003-12-01	Abingdon, MD	Philadelphia Jr. Flyers (JWHL)
12	(United States)	Marielle Parks	Senior	F	5' 6" (1.68 m)	2002-09-16	Erie, PA	Niagara Jr Purple Eagles 19U
14	(Finland)	Julia Schalin	Freshman	F	5' 3" (1.6 m)	2005-08-31	Espoo, Finland	Kiekko Espoo (Auroraliiga)
15	(Sweden)	Julia Perjus	Freshman	F	5' 8" (1.73 m)	2004-11-17	Stockholm, Sweden	MoDo Hockey (SHDL)
16	(Canada)	Henlee Mahoney	Sophomore	F	5' 7" (1.7 m)	2005-00-00	Niagara Falls, ON	Stoney Creek Sabres (OWHL)
18	(United States)	Mary Kromer (A)	Graduate	F	5' 6" (1.68 m)	2002-05-07	Angola, NY	Stoney Creek Sabres
19	(Canada)	Jade Maisonneuve	Junior	F	5' 4" (1.63 m)	2003-09-23	St-Isidore, ON	Nepean Wildcats (OWHL)
20	(Sweden)	Thea Johansson	Junior	F	5' 7" (1.7 m)	2002-11-22	Ljungby, SWE	HV71 (SDHL)
21	(Hungary)	Regina Metzler	Freshman	F	5' 10" (1.78 m)	2005-10-25	Budapest, Hungary	OHA Mavericks U22 (OWHL)
22	(Finland)	Sofia Nuutinen	Sophomore	F	5' 7" (1.7 m)	2002-06-14	Vantaa, Finland	Finland National Team
24	(Canada)	Vanessa Upson (C)	Senior	F	5' 5" (1.65 m)	2003-11-18	Stoney Creek, ON	Stoney Creek Sabres (OWHL)
25	(Canada)	Sydney Pedersen (A)	Senior	D	5' 8" (1.73 m)	2003-10-30	Milestone, SK	Regina Rebels
26	(Canada)	Chantal Ste-Croix	Graduate	F	5' 4" (1.63 m)	2002-06-02	Brampton, ON	Cardinal Leger Secondary School
27	(Canada)	Mary Sweetapple	Senior	D	5' 8" (1.73 m)	2003-05-06	Centre Burlington, NS	Ridley College
28	(Canada)	Kylee Mahoney	Senior	F	5' 7" (1.7 m)	2003-05-25	Niagara Falls, ON	Niagara Rapids (OWHA)
30	(Canada)	Jorden Mattison	Graduate	G	5' 9" (1.75 m)	2002-04-17	Fenwick, ON	University of Maine (NCAA)
31	(Austria)	Magdalena Luggin	Freshman	G	5' 9" (1.75 m)	2005-11-06	Vienna, Austria	SKN Sabres St.Pölten (EWHL)
34	(Canada)	Avery Norman	Freshman	G	5' 6" (1.68 m)	2005-00-00	Nepean, ON	Nepean Wildcats (OWHL)

== Schedule ==
As part of the agreement between the AHA and FloSports, conference games were streamed on the FloHockey platform.

Date	Time	Opponent^{#}	Rank^{#}	Site	Decision	Result	Attendance	Record	Ref
Exhibition
September 21	6:00 pm	vs. Stoney Creek Jr. Sabres*		– • –	–	–	–	0–0–0 (0–0–0)	
Regular Season
September 27	6:00 pm	#7 Colgate*	#15	Mercyhurst Ice Center • Erie, PA	Mattison	L 2–3	650	0–1–0 (0–0–0)	
September 28	3:00 pm	#7 Colgate*	#15	Mercyhurst Ice Center • Erie, PA	Mattison	W 4–3 ^{OT}	239	1–1–0 (0–0–0)	
October 4	7:00 pm	at #11 St. Cloud*	#15	Herb Brooks National Hockey Center • St. Cloud, MN	Mattison	L 1–2	356	1–2–0 (0–0–0)	
October 5	2:00 pm	at #11 St. Cloud*	#15	Herb Brooks National Hockey Center • St. Cloud, MN	Luggin	L 0–2	385	1–3–0 (0–0–0)	
October 11	3:00 pm	at #7 St. Lawrence*	#RV	Appleton Arena • Canton, NY	Mattison	L 0–3	305	1–4–0 (0–0–0)	
October 12	3:00 pm	at #7 St. Lawrence*	#RV	Appleton Arena • Canton, NY	Luggin	L 1–2	440	1–5–0 (0–0–0)	
October 18	6:00 pm	#11 Cornell*	#15	Mercyhurst Ice Center • Erie, PA	Mattison	T 0–0 ^{SO L}	500	1–5–1 (0–0–0)	
October 19	1:00 pm	#11 Cornell*	#15	Mercyhurst Ice Center • Erie, PA	Luggin	W 2–1	410	2–5–1 (0–0–0)	
October 22	6:00 pm	at #2 Ohio State*	#RV	OSU Ice Rink • Columbus, Ohio	Mattison	L 1–5	412	2–6–1 (0–0–0)	
November 1	6:00 pm	at Lindenwood	#RV	Centene Community Ice Center • St. Charles, MO	Mattison	W 3–1	187	3–6–1 (1–0–0)	
November 2	1:30 pm	at Lindenwood	#RV	Centene Community Ice Center • St. Charles, MO	Luggin	L 1–2	144	3–7–1 (1–1–0)	
November 15	7:00 pm	at Robert Morris	#RV	Clearview Arena • Moon Township, PA	Mattison	W 2–0	430	4–7–1 (2–1–0)	
November 16	3:00 pm	at Robert Morris	#RV	Clearview Arena • Moon Township, PA	Mattison	W 5–0	405	5–7–1 (3–1–0)	
November 22	3:00 pm	RIT		Mercyhurst Ice Center • Erie, PA	Mattison	W 2–1	358	6–7–1 (4–1–0)	
November 23	1:00 pm	RIT		Mercyhurst Ice Center • Erie, PA	Mattison	L 3–4	390	6–8–1 (4–2–0)	
November 26	6:00 pm	New Hampshire*		Mercyhurst Ice Center • Erie, PA	Luggin	W 1–3	824	6–9–1 (4–2–0)	
November 27	2:00 pm	New Hampshire*		Mercyhurst Ice Center • Erie, PA	Luggin	W 4–1	718	7–9–1 (4–2–0)	
December 6	3:00 pm	#12 Penn State		Mercyhurst Ice Center • Erie, PA	Luggin	L 2–4	652	7–10–1 (4–3–0)	
December 7	1:00 pm	#12 Penn State		Mercyhurst Ice Center • Erie, PA	Mattison	L 2–3	462	7–11–1 (4–4–0)	
January 4	4:00 pm	Saint Michael's*		Mercyhurst Ice Center • Erie, PA	Lind	W 11–1	350	8–11–1 (4–4–0)	
January 5	12:00 pm	Saint Michael's*		Mercyhurst Ice Center • Erie, PA	Mattison	W 6–0	329	9–11–1 (4–4–0)	
January 10	6:00 pm	at Syracuse		Tennity Ice Pavilion • Syracuse, NY	Mattison	W 2–1	143	10–11–1 (5–4–0)	
January 11	3:00 pm	at Syracuse		Tennity Ice Pavilion • Syracuse, NY	Luggin	W 4–2	165	11–11–1 (6–4–0)	
January 17	3:00 pm	Lindenwood	#RV	Mercyhurst Ice Center • Erie, PA	Mattison	W 3–1	931	12–11–1 (7–4–0)	
February 18	12:00 pm	Lindenwood		Mercyhurst Ice Center • Erie, PA	Luggin	W 5–2	457	13–11–1 (8–4–0)	
January 21	4:00 pm	#2 Ohio State*		Mercyhurst Ice Center • Erie, PA	Mattison	L 1–5	487	13–12–1 (8–4–0)	
January 24	6:00 pm	Robert Morris		Mercyhurst Ice Center • Erie, PA	Luggin	W 7–0	317	14–12–1 (9–4–0)	
January 25	1:00 pm	Robert Morris		Mercyhurst Ice Center • Erie, PA	Mattison	W 6–0	423	15–12–1 (10–4–0)	
January 31	6:00 pm	at RIT		Gene Polisseni Center • Rochester, NY	Luggin	W 3–2	624	16–12–1 (11–4–0)	
February 1	3:00 pm	at RIT		Gene Polisseni Center • Rochester, NY	Mattison	T 1–1	705	16–12–2 (11–4–1)	
February 7	6:00 pm	at #8 Penn State		Pegula Ice Arena • University Park, PA	Mattison	L 3–4 ^{OT}	1,052	16–13–2 (11–5–1)	
February 8	2:00 pm	at #14 Penn State		Pegula Ice Arena • University Park, PA	Mattison	W 3–2	1,340	17–13–2 (12–5–1)	
February 14	6:00 pm	Syracuse		Mercyhurst Ice Center • Erie, PA	Luggin	W 5–3	921	18–13–2 (13–5–1)	
February 15	1:00 pm	Syracuse		Mercyhurst Ice Center • Erie, PA	Mattison	L 2–4	1,108	18–14–2 (13–6–1)	
AHA Tournament
February 28	3:00 pm	Syracuse	#RV	Mercyhurst Ice Center (Semifinals) • Erie, PA	Mattison	L 0–1	843	18–15–2 (13–7–1)	
March 1	2:00 pm	#3 Syracuse	#RV	Mercyhurst Ice Center (Semifinals) • Erie, PA	Luggin	W 4–0	897	19–15–2 (14–7–1)	
March 2	2:00 pm	#3 Syracuse	#RV	Mercyhurst Ice Center (Semifinals) • Erie, PA	Luggin	W 5–2	862	20–15–2 (15–7–1)	
March 8	2:00 pm	at #8 Penn State	#RV	Pegula Ice Arena (Finals) • University Park, PA	Luggin	L 1–4	1,315	20–16–2 (15–8–1)	
*Non-conference game. ^{#}Rankings from USCHO.com Poll.

== Awards and honors ==
Weekly Awards
Player	Award	Date Awarded	Ref.
Jorden Mattisen	AHA Goaltender of the Week	November 18, 2024	
Julia Schalin	AHA Rookie of the Week	November 18, 2024	
Vanessa Upson	AHA Forward of the Week	November 25, 2024	
Marielle Parks	AHA Forward of the Week	December 2, 2024	
Makayla Javier	AHA Defenseman of the Week	December 2, 2024	
Magdalena Luggin	AHA Goalie of the Week	December 2, 2024	
Vanessa Upson	AHA Forward of the Week	January 6, 2025	
Megan McKay	AHA Defenseman of the Week	January 6, 2025	
Sofia Nuutinen	AHA Forward of the Week	January 13, 2025	
Thea Johansson	AHA Forward of the Week	January 20, 2025	
Mary Sweetapple	AHA Defenseman of the Week	January 20, 2025	
Megan McKay	AHA Defenseman of the Week	January 20, 2025	
Julia Schalin	AHA Rookie of the Week	February 10, 2025	
Mary Sweetapple	AHA Defenseman of the Week	February 17, 2025	
Makayla Javier	AHA Defenseman of the Week	March 3, 2025	
Magdalena Luggin	AHA Goalie of the Week	March 3, 2025	
Julia Schalin	AHA Rookie of the Week	March 3, 2025	

Monthly Awards
Player	Award	Month	Ref.
Jorden Mattison	AHA Goaltender of the Month	November	
Julia Schalin	AHA Rookie of the Month	November	
Vanessa Upson	AHA Forward of the Month	Jarnuary	
Megan McKay	AHA Defenseman of the Month	Jarnuary	
Julia Schalin	AHA Rookie of the Month	Jarnuary	
Vanessa Upson	AHA Forward of the Month	February	
Julia Schalin	AHA Rookie of the Month	February	

Annual Awards & Honors
Player	Award
Vanessa Upson	All-AHA First Team
Megan McKay	All-AHA Second Team
Julia Schalin	AHA All-Rookie Team
Magdalena Luggin	AHA All-Rookie Team
Julia Schalin	AHA Rookie of the Year
Marielle Parks	AHA Individual Sportsmanship Award
Mercyhurst Lakers	Team Sportsmanship Award

== Players drafted into the PWHL ==
Players Drafted into the PWHL
Year	Round	Pick	Player	Team
2025	5	38	Vanessa Upson	Minnesota Frost
