= Mercyhurst Lakers ice hockey =

Mercyhurst Lakers ice hockey may refer to either of the ice hockey teams that represent Mercyhurst University:

- Mercyhurst Lakers men's ice hockey
- Mercyhurst Lakers women's ice hockey
