= 2021–22 Mercyhurst Lakers women's ice hockey season =

- Conference: 3rd CHA
- Home ice: Mercyhurst Ice Center

Rankings
- USA Today/USA Hockey Magazine: Not Ranked
- USCHO.com: Not Ranked

Record
- Overall: 21–12–2
- Conference: 10–6–0
- Home: 13–3–1
- Road: 6–7–1
- Neutral: 2–2–0

Coaches and captains
- Head coach: Michael Sisti
- Assistant coaches: Beth Hanrahan; Scott Spencer
- Captain(s): Alexa Vasko; K.K. Thiessen
- Alternate captain: Sarah Nelles

The Mercyhurst Lakers clinched a semifinal berth in the 2022 CHA Championship. The team beat Penn State University in the semi-finals but fell in overtime to Syracuse University in the CHA finals and did not qualify for the 2022 NCAA Division I tournament for a second consecutive year.

This was head coach Michael Sisti's 23rd season. With the departure of assistant coach Kelley Steadman last season, Scott Spencer joined the coaching staff as an assistant coach. Spencer was previously a head coach for the Lindenwood Lady Lions.

Following two seasons impacted by the COVID-19 pandemic, the season returned to normal and fans were welcomed back to Mercyhurst Ice Center.

The season saw the addition of freshman forward Vanessa Upson, who was voted the CHA Preseason Co-Rookie of the year alongside Sarah Marchand of Syracuse University. Upson led the team in points (39), with 19 goals and 20 assists. She also led all NCAA Division I freshmen in points, goals, and assists.

== Departures ==
Departures from the previous season.

Player	Position	Nationality	Reason
Gabrielle Cox	Forward	United States	Transfer to Manhattanville University
Summer-Rae Dobson	Forward	Canada	Graduate transfer to University of Connecticut
Leah Klassen	Goaltender	Canada	Graduation
Megan Korzack	Forward	Canada	Graduate transfer to St. Thomas University
Rachel Marmen	Defense	Canada	Graduation (drafted 10th Overall by Toronto Six)

== Incoming ==
Player	Position	Nationality	Notes
Alyssa Kawa	Forward	Canada	Played alongside Upson for the Stoney Creek Sabres
Kylee Mahoney	Forward	Canada	Played for the Oakville Jr. Hornets
Marielle Parks	Forward	United States	Niagara Jr Purple Eagles 19U
Sydney Pedersen	Defense	Canada	Played with the Regina Rebels
Kristy Pidgeon	Forward	Canada	Graduate transfer from Clarkson University
Mary Sweetapple	Defense	Canada	Invited to the Hockey Canada U18 Virtual Camp
Vanessa Upson	Forward	Canada	Named to the Hockey Canada U18 Summer Camp
Sydney Wegner	Forward	United States	Played for Williston Northampton School
Hanna Zukow	Goaltender	Canada	Named to Hockey Canada's NextGen Athletes

== Standings ==
2021–22 College Hockey America standings
	Conference							Overall					
	GP	W	L	T	PTS	GF	GA	GP	W	L	T	GF	GA
Syracuse † *	16	11	4	1	23	50	34	32	15	11	6	85	81
Penn State	14	8	3	3	19	37	23	33	18	10	5	96	57
Mercyhurst	16	10	6	0	20	53	32	35	21	12	2	107	73
Lindenwood	14	4	9	1	14	34	49	29	6	22	1	71	134
RIT	16	1	12	3	5	21	57	33	2	27	4	52	148
Championship: February 26, 2022 † indicates conference regular season champion; * indicates conference tournament champion Rankings: USCHO.com; updated March 20, 2022

== Roster ==
As of June 15, 2026

No.	Nat.	Player	Class	Pos	Height	DoB	Hometown	Previous team
1	(Canada)	Hanna Zukow	Freshman	G	5' 10" (1.78 m)	2003-05-03	Unionville, ON	Durham West Jr. Lightning
2	(United States)	Sydney Wegner	Freshman	F	5' 7" (1.7 m)	2002-08-19	Mount Dora, FL	Williston Northampton School
4	(Canada)	Grace Nelles	Sophomore	F	5' 10" (1.78 m)	2002-01-18	St. Anns, ON	Stoney Creek Jr. Sabres
5	(United States)	Calista Rowbottom	Sophomore	D	5' 4" (1.63 m)	2001-07-15	Catawissa, MO	Dallas Stars Elite 19U
6	(Canada)	K.K Thiessen (C)	Graduate	D	5' 8" (1.73 m)	1999-07-07	Winnipeg, MB	Team Manitoba
7	(Canada)	Alyssa Kawa	Freshman	F	5' 5" (1.65 m)	2003-05-17	Hamilton, ON	Stoney Creek Sabres
8	(Canada)	Jordan Mortlock	Junior	D	5' 7" (1.7 m)	2001-01-15	Medicine Hat, AB	Pursuit of Excellence
9	(United States)	Mary Katherine Gialames	Senior	D	5' 7" (1.7 m)	2000-01-24	Pittsburgh, PA	Pittsburgh Penguins Elite
10	(Canada)	Alexa Vasko (C)	Graduate	F	5' 5" (1.65 m)	1999-02-07	St. Catharines, ON	Stoney Creek Sabres
11	(Canada)	Sarah Nelles (A)	Junior	F	5' 6" (1.68 m)	2000-06-13	St. Anns, ON	Stoney Creek Sabres
12	(United States)	Marielle Parks	Freshman	F	5' 6" (1.68 m)	2002-09-16	Erie, PA	Niagara Jr Purple Eagles 19U
14	(Canada)	Sara Boucher	Sophomore	F	5' 7" (1.7 m)	2002-05-06	Burlington, ON	Oakville Hornets
15	(Canada)	Kristy Pidgeon	Graduate	F	5' 10" (1.78 m)	1999-12-16	Ingleside, ON	Clarkson Golden Knights (NCAA)
16	(United States)	Jersey Phillips	Sophomore	F	5' 3" (1.6 m)	2002-05-25	Orchard Park, NY	Nichols School
18	(United States)	Mary Kromer	Sophomore	F	5' 6" (1.68 m)	2002-05-07	Angola, NY	Stoney Creek Sabres
19	(Canada)	Emily Pinto	Senior	F	5' 3" (1.6 m)	1999-10-12	Mississauga, ON	Durham West Lightning
20	(Canada)	Paige Whaley	Sophomore	F	5' 6" (1.68 m)	2002-09-22	Carlisle, ON	Etobicoke Jr. Dolphins
21	(Canada)	Alexane Rhéaume	Senior	D	5' 6" (1.68 m)	2000-11-30	Sherbrooke, QC	Champlain Cougars
22	(United States)	Alexandria Weiss	Junior	D	5' 6" (1.68 m)	2001-06-19	Plover, WI	Bishop Kearney Selects
23	(Canada)	Aubrey Cole	Junior	D	5' 11" (1.8 m)	2001-07-22	Sarnia, ON	Bluewater Jr. Hawks
24	(Canada)	Vanessa Upson	Freshman	F	5' 5" (1.65 m)	2003-11-18	Stoney Creek, ON	Stoney Creek Sabres
25	(Canada)	Sydney Pedersen	Freshman	D	5' 8" (1.73 m)	2003-10-30	Milestone, SK	Regina Rebels
26	(Canada)	Chantal Ste-Croix	Sophomore	F	5' 4" (1.63 m)	2002-06-02	Brampton, ON	Cardinal Leger Secondary School
27	(Canada)	Mary Sweetapple	Freshman	D	5' 8" (1.73 m)	2003-05-06	Centre Burlington, NS	Ridley College
28	(Canada)	Kylee Mahoney	Freshman	F	5' 7" (1.7 m)	2003-05-25	Niagara Falls, ON	Niagara Rapids
30	(Finland)	Jenna Silvonen	Junior	G	5' 5" (1.65 m)	1999-01-02	Lohja,Finland	Blues U20 (Naisten Liiga)
31	(Norway)	Ena Nystrøm	Junior	G	5' 10" (1.78 m)	2000-04-28	Stavanger, Norway	RPI Engineers (NCAA)
34	(United States)	Liliane Perreault	Senior	F	5' 7" (1.7 m)	2000-03-16	Hinsdale, IL	Chicago Mission

== Schedule ==
Date	Time	Opponent^{#}	Rank^{#}	Site	Decision	Result	Attendance	Record	Ref
Regular Season
September 19	12:05 pm	RIT*		Mercyhurst Ice Center • Erie, PA	Silvonen	W 6–3	557	1–0–0 (0–0–0)	
September 24	6:05 pm	RPI*		Mercyhurst Ice Center • Erie, PA	Nystrøm	W 2–1 ^{OT}	623	2–0–0 (0–0–0)	
September 25	3:05 pm	RPI*		Mercyhurst Ice Center • Erie, PA	Silvonen	W 2–0	726	3–0–0 (0–0–0)	
October 1	6:00 pm	at #4 Colgate*		Class of 1965 Arena • Hamilton, NY	Nystrøm	L 2–5	313	3–1–0 (0–0–0)	
October 2	3:00 pm	at Colgate*	#4	Class of 1965 Arena • Hamilton, NY	Silvonen	L 2–4	316	3–2–0 (0–0–0)	
October 8	6:05 pm	Franklin Pierce*		Mercyhurst Ice Center • Erie, PA	Nystrøm	W 9–1	789	4–2–0 (0–0–0)	
October 9	2:05 pm	Franklin Pierce*		Mercyhurst Ice Center • Erie, PA	Silvonen	W 1–0	852	5–2–0 (0–0–0)	
October 15	3:00 pm	at Union*		Messa Rink • Schenectady, NY	Nystrøm	W 5–0	135	6–2–0 (0–0–0)	
October 16	1:00 pm	at Union*		Messa Rink • Schenectady, NY	Silvonen	T 2–2	125	6–2–1 (0–0–0)	
October 22	6:00 pm	at #9 Cornell*	#16	Lynah Rink • Ithaca, NY	Nystrøm	W 3–2	350	7–2–1 (0–0–0)	
October 23	3:00 pm	at #9 Cornell*	#16	Lynah Rink • Ithaca, NY	Silvonen	L 0–4	265	7–3–1 (0–0–0)	
October 29	6:05 pm	Penn State		Mercyhurst Ice Center • Erie, PA	Nystrøm	W 4–3	769	8–3–1 (1–0–0)	
October 30	2:05 pm	Penn State		Mercyhurst Ice Center • Erie, PA	Nystrøm	L 0–3	702	8–4–1 (1–1–0)	
November 12	6:05 pm	St. Lawrence*		Mercyhurst Ice Center • Erie, PA	Silvonen	W 3–2	898	9–4–1 (1–1–0)	
November 13	2:05 pm	St. Lawrence*		Mercyhurst Ice Center • Erie, PA	Silvonen	T 1–1	647	9–4–2 (1–1–0)	
November 19	2:00 pm	at RIT		Frank Ritter Memorial Ice Arena • Rochester, NY	Silvonen	W 3–1	118	10–4–1 (2–1–0)	
November 20	1:00 pm	at RIT		Frank Ritter Memorial Ice Arena • Rochester, NY	Nystrøm	W 6–1	250	11–4–2 (3–1–0)	
November 26	4:30 pm CT	vs. #5 University of Minnesota*	#13	Ford Ice Center (Smashville Showcase) • Nashville, TN	Nystrøm	L 0–4	800	11–5–2 (3–1–0)	
November 27	1:00 pm CT	vs. Boston College*	#13	Ford Ice Center (Smashville Showcase) • Nashville, TN	Silvonen	W 4–2	500	12–5–2 (3–1–0)	
December 3	7:00 pm	at Syracuse		Tennity Ice Skating Pavilion • Syracuse, NY	Silvonen	W 3–0	168	13–5–2 (4–1–0)	
December 4	3:00 pm	at Syracuse		Tennity Ice Skating Pavilion • Syracuse, NY	Nystrøm	L 1–3	184	13–6–2 (4–2–0)	
January 7	6:05 pm	Long Island*		Mercyhurst Ice Center • Erie, PA	Nystrøm	W 4–2	285	14–6–2 (4–2–0)	
January 8	2:05 pm	Long Island*		Mercyhurst Ice Center • Erie, PA	Silvonen	L 2–3	325	14–7–2 (4–2–0)	
January 14	6:05 pm	Lindenwood		Mercyhurst Ice Center • Erie, PA	Nystrøm	W 3–1	120	15–7–2 (5–2–0)	
January 15	2:05 pm	Lindenwood		Mercyhurst Ice Center • Erie, PA	Nystrøm	W 4–2	120	16–7–2 (6–2–0)	
January 28	2:00 pm	at Penn State		Pegula Ice Arena • University Park, PA	Nystrøm	L 1–2	412	16–8–2 (6–3–0)	
January 29	2:00 pm	at Penn State		Pegula Ice Arena • University Park, PA	Silvonen	L 1–3	758	16–9–2 (6–4–0)	
February 4	6:05 pm	RIT		Mercyhurst Ice Center • Erie, PA	Nystrøm	W 5–1	507	17–9–2 (7–4–0)	
February 5	2:05 pm	RIT		Mercyhurst Ice Center • Erie, PA	Silvonen	W 3–2 ^{OT}	497	18–9–2 (8–4–0)	
February 11	3:05 pm	Syracuse		Mercyhurst Ice Center • Erie, PA	Nystrøm	W 9–0	467	19–9–2 (9–4–0)	
February 12	2:05 pm	Syracuse		Mercyhurst Ice Center • Erie, PA	Nystrøm	L 1–4	759	19–10–2 (9–5–0)	
February 18	6:00 pm CT	at Lindenwood		Centene Community Ice Center • St. Charles, MO	Nystrøm	W 1–4	387	20–10–2 (10–5–0)	
February 19	12:10 pm CT	at Lindenwood		Centene Community Ice Center • St. Charles, MO	Silvonen	L 3–4	213	20–11–2 (10–6–0)	
CHA Tournament
February 25	4:00 pm	vs. Penn State		Tennity Ice Pavilion (Semifinals) • Syracuse, NY	Nystrøm	W 4–2	–	21–11–2 (11–6–0)	
February 26	2:00 pm	vs. Syracuse		Tennity Ice Pavilion (Finals) • Syracuse, NY	Nystrøm	L 2–3	–	21–12–2 (11–7–0)	
*Non-conference game. ^{#}Rankings from USCHO.com Poll.

== Awards and honors ==
Weekly Awards
Player	Award	Date Awarded	Ref.
Vanessa Upson	CHA Forward of the Week	September 27, 2021	
Vanessa Upson	CHA Forward of the Week	October 11, 2021	
Jordan Mortlock	CHA Defenseman of the Week	October 11, 2021	
Ena Nystrøm	CHA Goalie of the Week	October 18, 2021	
Alexa Vasko	CHA Forward of the Week	October 18, 2021	
Ena Nystrøm	CHA Goalie of the Week	October 25, 2021	
Sydney Pedersen	CHA Defenseman of the Week	November 1, 2021	
Jordan Mortlock	CHA Defenseman of the Week	November 15, 2021	
Kristy Pidgeon	CHA Forward of the Week	November 15, 2021	
Jenna Silvonen	CHA Goaltender of the Week	November 15, 2021	
Vanessa Upson	CHA Rookie of the Week	November 22, 2021	
Sydney Pedersen	CHA Rookie of the Week	November 29, 2021	
Jenna Silvonen	CHA Goaltender of the Week	November 29, 2021	
Jenna Silvonen	PPG Paints Student-Athletes of the Week	December 6, 2021	
K.K. Thiessen	CHA Defenseman of the Week	December 6, 2021	
Sara Boucher	PPG Paints Student-Athletes of the Week	January 11, 2022	
Vanessa Upson	PPG Paints Student-Athletes of the Week	January 17, 2022	
Ena Nystrøm	CHA Goaltender of the Week	January 17, 2022	
Sydney Pedersen	CHA Defenseman of the Week	January 17, 2022	
Vanessa Upson	CHA Forward of the Week	January 17, 2022	
Chantal Ste-Croix	CHA Forward of the Week	February 7, 2022	
K.K. Thiessen	CHA Defenseman of the Week	February 7, 2022	
Sara Boucher	CHA Forward of the Week	February 14, 2022	
Sara Boucher	CHA Forward of the Week	February 21, 2022	
Jordan Mortlock	CHA Defenseman of the Week	February 21, 2022	
Vanessa Upson	CHA Rookie of the Week	February 21, 2022	
Sara Boucher	PPG Paints Student-Athletes of the Week	March 1, 2022	

Monthly Awards
Player	Award	Month	Ref.
Vanessa Upson	CHA Forward of the Month	September & October (Combined)	
Vanessa Upson	CHA Rookie of the Month	September & October (Combined)	
Vanessa Upson	CHA Rookie of the Month	November	
Jenna Silvonen	CHA Goaltender of the Month	November	
Jenna Silvonen	HCA National Co-Goaltender of the Month	November	
Vanessa Upson	CHA Rookie of the Month	January	
Sara Boucher	CHA Forward of the Month	February	
Vanessa Upson	CHA Rookie of the Month	February	

Annual Awards & Honors
Player	Award
K.K. Thiessen	Individual Sportsmanship Award
Sydney Pedersen	CHA All-Rookie Team
Vanessa Upson	CHA All-Rookie Team
Vanessa Upson	First All-CHA Team
Vanessa Upson	USCHO Rookie of the Year
Vanessa Upson	All-USCHO Rookie Team
Sara Boucher	Second All-CHA Team
K.K. Thiessen	Second All-CHA Team
Ena Nystrøm	Second All-CHA Team
