= Nystrom =

Nystrom is a surname of Danish, Norwegian and Swedish origin. Alternative spelling include Nyström, Nystrøm, and Nystroem. Notable people with these surnames include:

== Nystrom ==
- Anna Nystrom (1849–1913), Swedish missionary in the Caucasus, Persia, and Xinjiang, China
- Bob Nystrom (born 1952), Swedish-Canadian retired professional ice hockey right-winger
- Dave Nystrom, Canadian comedian and writer
- Drew Nystrom, American football coach
- Eric Nystrom (born 1983), American ice hockey player
- John W. Nystrom (1825-1885), Swedish-American engineer who proposed a hexadecimal system
- Karl F. Nystrom, American railroad engineer at the Milwaukee Road
- Kyle Nystrom, American football coach
- Lorne Nystrom, Canadian politician
- Mae Taylor Nystrom, American suffragist
- Paul Nystrom, American professor of marketing at Columbia University
- Stefan Nystrom, Australian criminal (supposed)

== Nyström ==
- Anders Nyström, Swedish rock musician
- Ann-Christine Nyström, Finnish singer
- Bob Nyström, Swedish-born Canadian ice hockey player
- David Nyström, Swedish ice hockey player
- Emilia Nyström, Finnish beach volleyball player
- Erika Nyström, Finnish beach volleyball player
- Hjalmar Nyström (1904–1960), Finnish wrestler and Olympic medalist
- Jenny Nyström, Swedish painter and illustrator
- Johan Olof Nyström, Swedish Olympic swimmer
- Johan Nyström (swimmer), Swedish swimmer
- Johan Nyström (athlete) (1874–1968), Swedish track and field athlete
- Joakim Nyström, Swedish tennis player
- Lars-Fredrik Nyström, Swedish ice hockey player
- Per Nyström, Swedish historian and politician
- Rikard Nyström (1884–1943), Swedish missionary
- Usko Nyström (1861–1925), Finnish architect

== Nystrøm ==
- Lene Nystrøm Rasted, Norwegian singer
- Søren Nystrøm Rasted, Danish musician
- Steffen Nystrøm, Norwegian football (soccer) player

== Nystroem ==
- Gösta Nystroem, Swedish composer

== See also ==
- Nyström method - Numerical analysis named after Evert Johannes Nyström.
