= Emily Janiga =

American ice hockey player (born 1994)

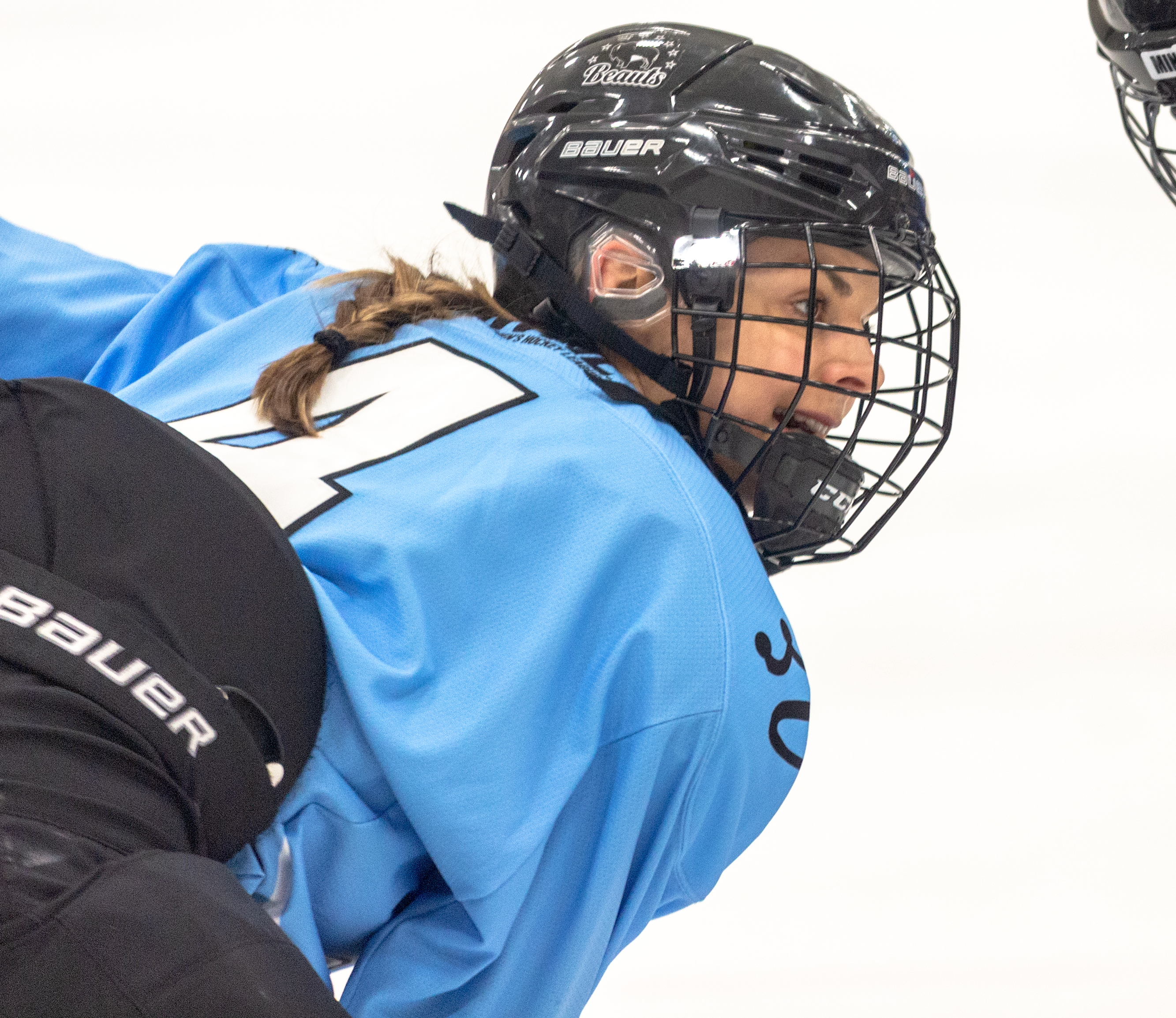
- Janiga with the Buffalo Beauts in 2019
- Born: March 4, 1994 (age 32) East Aurora, New York, U.S.
- Height: 5 ft 10 in (178 cm)
- Weight: 134 lb (61 kg; 9 st 8 lb)
- Position: Forward
- Shoots: Right
- PHF team Former teams: Metropolitan Riveters; Buffalo Beauts; Vanke Rays; PWHPA
- National team: United States
- Playing career: 2012–present

Emily Janiga (born March 4, 1994) is an American ice hockey player currently playing for the Metropolitan Riveters in the Premier Hockey Federation.

== Playing career ==
=== NCAA ===
Janiga played for Mercyhurst University from the 2012–13 season until the 2015–16 season. She made an immediate impact on the team, with a hat trick in her second game. She ended her Freshman year with the second most goals in the conference and was named to the All-CHA Rookie team. As a sophomore, she was named to the All-CHA First team. In her junior season at Mercyhurst University, she was named the College Hockey America Conference (CHA) Player of the Year, she was the conference scoring leader and a member of the All-CHA First Team. She was the captain of the Mercyhurst team during her Junior and Senior years. During her collegiate career, she scored 151 points (72 Goals, 79 Assists) in 141 games, and attended 3 NCAA Final 8 tournaments and 2 NCAA Frozen Four tournaments. She wrapped up her career at Mercyhurst University by earning Female Athlete of the Year in her senior year (2016).

=== Professional career ===
Back when the PHF was known as the NWHL, the Buffalo Beauts of the NWHL secured rights to Janiga in the inaugural league draft. She was the 16th player picked in that draft. She signed with the Beauts shortly after finishing her collegiate career in May 2016. The following year, Janiga signed with the Vanke Rays of the Canadian Women's Hockey League but returned to the Beauts in July 2018.

== International play ==
=== USA Hockey ===
Janiga was an invitee to the Team USA Women's National Festival in Lake Placid, NY, and was a part of the National Team program for 2 years. Janiga made the 4 Nations Cup Roster in 2015 but unfortunately suffered an injury a few days before the tournament.

== Career statistics ==
=== NCAA ===
Season	GP	G	A	Pts
2012-13 Mercyhurst	37	19	22	41
2013-14 Mercyhurst	37	15	26	41
2014-15 Mercyhurst	35	27	18	45
2015-16 Mercyhurst	32	11	13	24
Mercyhurst Career	141	72	79	151

=== National Women's Hockey League (NWHL) ===
Season	GP	G	A	Pts
2016-17 Buffalo Beauts	17	6	5	11
2017 Buffalo Beauts Playoffs	2	3	1	4

=== Provincial Women’s Hockey League (PWHL) ===
Season GP G A Pts 2010-11 Burlington Barracudas PWHL (W) 36 19 22 41 2011-12 Burlington Barracudas “C” PWHL (W) 34 27 21 48

== Awards and honors ==
- 2013 All-CHA Rookie Team
- 2014 All-CHA First Team
- 2015 All-CHA First Team
- 2015 CHA Player of the Year
- 2016 Mercyhurst University Female Athlete of the Year
- Mercyhurst Women’s Hockey Captain 2014/15, 2015/16 Season
