= Jenna Silvonen =

Finnish ice hockey player

- Born: 2 January 1999 (age 27) Lohja, Finland
- Height: 1.64 m (5 ft 5 in)
- Weight: 63 kg (139 lb; 9 st 13 lb)
- Position: Goaltender
- Caught: Left
- Played for: Kiekko-Espoo; Mercyhurst Lakers; Espoo United; Espoo Blues
- National team: Finland
- Playing career: 2016–2023
Medal record
World Championship
Silver medal – second place	2019 Finland
Bronze medal – third place	2021 Canada

Jenna Silvonen (born 2 January 1999) is a Finnish retired ice hockey goaltender and former member of the Finnish national team. Her college ice hockey career was played with the Mercyhurst Lakers women's ice hockey program in the College Hockey America (CHA) conference of the NCAA Division I during 2019 to 2022.

She represented Finland at the IIHF Women's World Championship tournaments in 2019, 2021, and 2022.

Silvonen retired from ice hockey in September 2023 due to continued symptoms of post-concussion syndrome following a concussion sustained when she was hit in the chin by a puck while in net during a Kiekko-Espoo game in September 2022.
