= Alexa Vasko =

Canadian ice hockey player (born 1999)

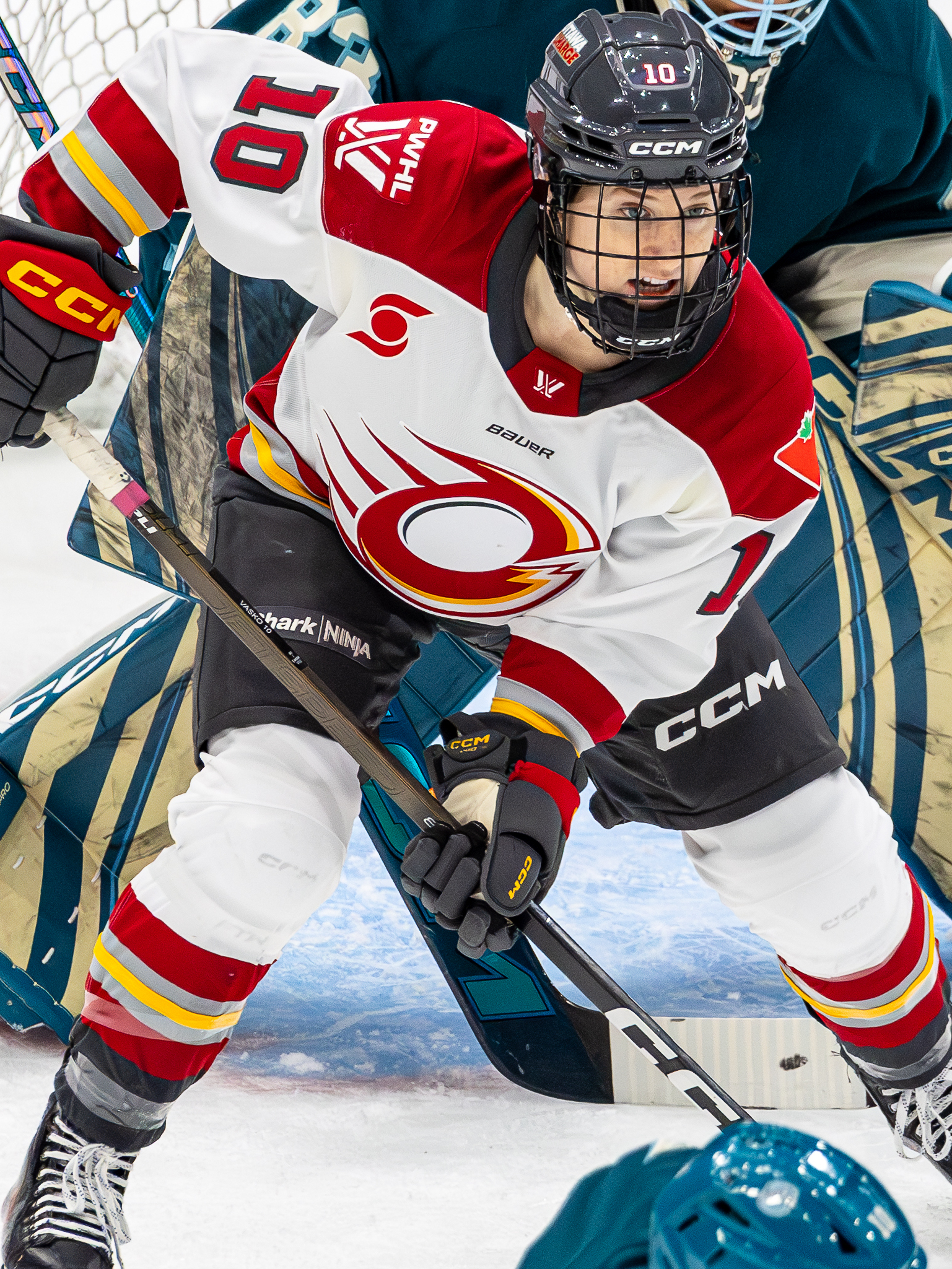
- Vasko with the Ottawa Charge in 2025
- Born: February 7, 1999 (age 27) St. Catharines, Ontario, Canada
- Height: 5 ft 5 in (165 cm)
- Weight: 150 lb (68 kg; 10 st 10 lb)
- Position: Forward
- Shoots: Left
- PWHL team Former teams: Hamilton Havoc; Ottawa Charge, PWHL Toronto
- Playing career: 2017–present

Alexa Vasko (born February 7, 1999) is a Canadian professional ice hockey forward for the Hamilton Havoc of the Professional Women's Hockey League (PWHL). She previously played for the Ottawa Charge, PWHL Toronto, and played college ice hockey at Mercyhurst.

== Playing career ==
=== College ===
Vasko began her collegiate career for Mercyhurst during the 2018–19 season. During her freshman year, she recorded one goal and ten assists in 37 games. During the 2018–19 season in her sophomore year, she recorded 12 goals and six assists in 33 games.

On May 15, 2019, Vasko was named co-captain for the 2019–20 season. In her junior year, she recorded ten goals and 17 assists in 34 games, and blocked 36 shots. Following the season, she was named the Best Defensive Forward in the CHA. She served as captain her final three years at Mercyhurst. During the 2020–21 season in her senior year, she recorded five goals and nine assists in 18 games, in a season that was shortened due to the COVID-19 pandemic. Following the season, she was named to the All-CHA Second Team. During the 2021–22 season as a graduate student, she recorded ten goals and nine assists in 34 games.

=== Professional ===
On September 18, 2023, Vasko was drafted in the fourteenth round, 83rd overall, by PWHL Toronto in the 2023 PWHL Draft. On November 29, 2023, she signed a one-year contract with Toronto. During the 2023–24 season, she recorded two goals in 24 games, and led the team with a 52.5% face-off percentage. On June 25, 2024, she signed a one-year contract with PWHL Ottawa.

On June 21, 2026, she signed a two-year standard player contract with the Hamilton Havoc.

== International play ==
Medal record

Representing Canada

Ice hockey

World U18 Championships
Silver medal – second place	2017 Czech Republic	

Vasko represented Canada at the 2017 IIHF World Women's U18 Championship where she served as alternate captain and recorded one goal in five games and won a silver medal.

== Personal life ==
Vasko was born to Dennis and Dana Vasko, and has a sister, Olivia. Her grand uncle, Elmer Vasko, is a former National Hockey League player for the Chicago Blackhawks and Minnesota North Stars.

== Career statistics ==
=== Regular season and playoffs ===
			Regular season					Playoffs
Season	Team	League	GP	G	A	Pts	PIM	GP	G	A	Pts	PIM
2017–18	Mercyhurst University	CHA	37	1	10	11	31	—	—	—	—	—
2018–19	Mercyhurst University	CHA	33	12	6	18	6	—	—	—	—	—
2019–20	Mercyhurst University	CHA	34	10	17	27	20	—	—	—	—	—
2020–21	Mercyhurst University	CHA	18	5	9	14	8	—	—	—	—	—
2021–22	Mercyhurst University	CHA	34	10	9	19	14	—	—	—	—	—
2022–23	Team Sonnet	PWHPA	20	4	1	5	10	—	—	—	—	—
2023–24	PWHL Toronto	PWHL	24	2	0	2	4	5	0	0	0	2
2024–25	Ottawa Charge	PWHL	24	2	2	4	8	8	0	0	0	0
2025–26	Ottawa Charge	PWHL	30	2	1	3	10	8	0	0	0	0
PWHL totals			78	6	3	9	22	21	0	0	0	2

=== International ===
Year	Team	Event	Result	GP	G	A	Pts	PIM
2017	Canada	U18	2nd place, silver medalist(s)	5	1	0	1	0
Junior totals				5	1	0	1	0
