= Mercyhurst Lakers women's ice hockey =

American college ice hockey program of Mercyhurst University

- Current season
- University: Mercyhurst University
- Conference: AHA
- Head coach: Michael Sisti; 27th season, 613–262–69
- Assistant coaches: Trey Flesch; Natasha Hawkins; Scott Spencer
- Captain(s): Makayla Javier
- Alternate captain(s): Jade Maisonneuve
- Arena: Mercyhurst Ice Center; Erie, PA
- Colors: Forest green and navy blue

NCAA tournament runner-up
- 2009

NCAA tournament Frozen Four
- 2009, 2010, 2013, 2014

NCAA tournament appearances
- 2005, 2006, 2007, 2008, 2009, 2010, 2011, 2012, 2013, 2014, 2016, 2018, 2019, 2020

Conference tournament champions
- CHA: 2003, 2004, 2005, 2006, 2007, 2008, 2009, 2010, 2011, 2013, 2016, 2018, 2020

Conference regular season champions
- CHA: 2003, 2004, 2005, 2006, 2007, 2008, 2009, 2010, 2011, 2012, 2013, 2014, 2015, 2016, 2020

The Mercyhurst Lakers women's ice hockey team is a college ice hockey program representing Mercyhurst University. They compete in the National Collegiate Athletic Association (NCAA) Division I competition as a member of the Atlantic Hockey America (AHA) conference. They play in Erie, Pennsylvania at the Mercyhurst Ice Center, located on the Mercyhurst campus.

The program started in 1999 and Michael Sisti was named its coach, and to date, remains the team's only coach. From 2000 to 2002, the Lakers were part of the Great Lakes Women's Hockey Association (GLWHA). The team won two GLWHA championship in 2001 and 2002.

The Lakers joined the joined the College Hockey America (CHA) conference for the 2002–03 season. The conference merged with the Atlantic Hockey Association shortly after the 2023–24 season to form the new Atlantic Hockey America.

== History ==
=== 1999 to 2002: Great Lakes Women's Hockey Association ===
The Mercyhurst women's ice hockey program predates NCAA governance in the sport. The GLWHA was formed by Mercyhurst University, the University of Findlay in Findlay, Ohio and Wayne State University in Detroit, Michigan, while the Title IX law protecting equity in sports was making major changes to women's athletics.

Michael Sisti had been an assistant coach with the Mercyhurst men's team since 1993 was named the inaugural head coach for the women's team in 1999. Prior to his time with Mercyhurst, Sisti spent three years as an assistant men's coach at Canisius College in Buffalo, New York. He also played four years with Canisius as a forward, graduating in 1990.

Mercyhurst was immediately successful in their first season in the GLWHA, finishing with a 23–6–0 record. They recorded 17 shutouts and scored 10 or more goals on six occasions. The team also scored in all but three games that season.

They were less successful in the 2000–01 regular season, finishing 14–16–3 while playing more established programs. Scoring was also a problem as the team was shut out six times. However, they were regular season champions and made the playoffs. The team went on to the GLWHA championship but fell 1–2 to the University of Findlay.

The team added freshman goaltender Desirae "Desi" Clark in the 2001–02 season. She split the season with Tiffany Ribble, a junior, and together they helped backstop the team to a 24–8–1 record, winning first in the conference for the second straight year. The team returned to the GLWHA championship game, playing Findlay for the second consecutive year. Chrissy Yule would score the game-winning goal in the third period and the Lakers would go on to win the GLWHA championship, beating Findlay 4–2. Britney Millar had three points in the game (2G, 1 A) and was named the playoff MVP. Ribble, Clark was named to the All-GLWHA First Team alongside defender Jenn Jeffrey and forward Sara McDonald.

=== College Hockey America through 2005–06 ===
With women's hockey under the NCAA taking off, women's conferences began merging with the existing men's conferences to strengthen the NCAA tournament. College Hockey America, a men's-only league at the time, began forming a women's conference to begin in the 2002–03 season. The conference would comprise Mercyhurst, Findlay and Wayne State from the GLWHA, and Niagara University from the ECAC conference.

In the first four years of the conference, Mercyhurst dominated the competition. Within the conference, they were 38–1–3, winning every regular season, and every tournament. Their overall record was 102–29–13 for the same period. However, in the first two years of the conference, the CHA as a smaller conference struggled in qualifying for the NCAA women's ice hockey tournament against much more storied conferences, like the ECAC and the WCHA. The 2005 NCAA tournament expanded the number of qualifying teams from four to eight teams and the Lakers qualified for the first time. The Lakers faced Harvard University in the NCAA quarterfinals on March 19. The ensuing game was one of the most bitterly fought in tournament history, with Harvard prevailing 5–4 in the third overtime period. During that game, Clark set an NCAA single game save record of 78 stops. The record stood until Kaitlyn Daly broke it with 89 saves in 2018.

Following the success of the 2004–05 season, the Lakers looked to carry the momentum into the 2005–06 season. While the team lost Clark and two of the team's top scorers, Teresa Marchese and Sara McDonald, in the off-season, they added Valerie Chouinard as one of the six 2005 commitments. In the USCHO's initial poll, the team was ranked fifth in the; the highest ever preseason ranking for the Lakers. The Lakers continued their success in the CHA, finishing first in the conference for the fourth straight season with a 10–0–2 conference record. The team qualified for the 2006 NCAA tournament as the seventh seed and would face the second seed Wisconsin Badgers in the quarterfinals. The Lakers fell to Wisconsin in double overtime despite outshooting them 38–35.

=== The Meghan Agosta years ===
By the mid-2000s Mercyhurst College (it would become Mercyhurst University in 2012), had several advantages in recruiting: The college itself, a small Catholic institution with very good academics; The success and graduation rate of its athletes; and, the overwhelming success of the team. The campus location near Lake Ontario was attractive to young women from Ontario, New York and Pennsylvania, a large pool of talent.

In 2006, the Lakers attracted Megan Agosta, perhaps the most sought-after talent in the NCAA. Even before attending college, she had won an Olympic gold medal at the 2006 Turin games with Team Canada as a 19 year old; the youngest player on the team. She became one of the best players of the decade in NCAA play.

With its building success and the addition of Agosta, Mercyhurst was once again ranked fifth in the USCHO preseason poll. The team would make its way to a #1 ranking, spending 11 weeks there in both the USCHO and USA Hockey polls. The Lakers finished the regular season with a program best 32–1–3 record; a record that still stands. The team qualified for the 2007 NCAA tournament as the second seed and would face the seventh seed Minnesota Duluth in the quarterfinals. Despite leading for most of the game, the Lakers would fall in overtime for the third straight year.

Agosta received many personal accolades after a strong freshman season. She was named to the CHA and USCO First and All-Rookie Teams and to the RBK Hockey/American Hockey Coaches Association (AHCA) Women's Division I All-American First Team as the only freshman named to either the first or second team. She was also named as the CHA Forward, Rookie and Tournament MVP as well as the USCHO Rookie of the Year. Agosta would be the first ever freshman to be a top three finalist for the Patty Kazmaier Award.

Mercyhurst continued recruiting strong prospects during the next two seasons. They added Vicki Bendus in 2007, who would win the 2010 Patty Kazmaier Award as the nation's top player, and was a top-10 finalist the following year, and forwards Bailey Bram, Kelley Steadman, Jess Jones, and goaltender Hillary Pattenden in 2008. Agosta was named team captain ahead of the 2008–09 season leading the team to a 16–0–0 conference record and an overall 29–5–0 record. The Lakers claimed their seventh consecutive CHA tournament trophy beating Wayne State 6–1, also giving Sisti his 250th career win.

The team qualified for their fifth consecutive NCAA tournament. The Lakers finally broke through during the 2009 NCAA tournament as they were able to make it past the quarterfinals into the Frozen Four. Agosta scored the game-winning goal with five seconds remaining in the semifinal game, to defeat Minnesota 5–4 to send the team to the championship game where they would go up against the first seed Wisconsin Badgers; the runner up the previous year. Despite outscoring the Badgers 37–32, the team was shutout fell 0–5.

Despite losing Agosta for the 2009–10 season to the 2010 Olympics, the Lakers continued their success. The Lakers started the season with a nine-game winning streak, losing their first game on October 31. They went on a 16-game streak before losing their next game. They were the top ranked team in the USA TODAY/USA Hockey Magazine poll for 22 consecutive weeks The Lakers again made it to the Frozen Four at the 2010 NCAA tournament. The team cruised through the quarterfinals, winning 4–1 over Boston University after scoring two quick goals in the first period. The Lakers would fall short in the semifinals, losing 2–3 in overtime to Cornell, who were making their first appearance in the tournament.

The silver lining to the season was Bendus being awarded the 2010 Patty Kazmaier Award, the first for Mercyhurst, edging out the other finalists Kelly Paton and Noora Räty. At the time of the award, she was the NCAA statistical leader in numerous offensive categories, including points, shortanded goals, and points per game.

Agosta returned as a senior for the 2010–11 season and had her best season offensively, finishing with 85 points (34 G, 47 A), finishing 27 points ahead of Jesse Scanzano, who had the second most points on the team. While the Lakers continued their regular season and CHA success, they failed to advance past the quarterfinals at the 2011 NCAA tournament.

In her collegiate career, Agosta would finish with 302 points (157 G, 145 A) in 134 games, setting many Mercyhurst, CHA, and NCAA records; many of which she still holds as of 2026. The team had a 118–22–6 record during this time, winning the CHA championship and qualifying for the NCAA tournament every year.

=== Post Agosta Era ===
Mercyhurst continued to be successful, if no longer dominant in the CHA conference. The Lakers lost their first CHA Championship during the 2011–12 season but continued to qualify for the NCAA tournament. In 2013 and 2014, the Lakers appeared in back-to-back Frozen Four contests. These teams were led by forward Christine Bestland, a captain for two years, national recognition by USCHO. com, and two time MVP of the CHA conference. The Lakers earned their record-setting 10th consecutive NCAA Tournament appearance in 2014.

Upon Bestland's graduation, Mercyhurst's successes were more modest, despite the leadership of forward Emily Janiga and defenseman Molly Byrne. The NCAA made the decision to award an automatic bid tournament to the winner of the CHA Championship beginning in the 2015 NCAA tournament. The CHA conference was previously represented with an at-large bid.

Mercyhurst failed to earn a berth in the national tournament in the 2014–2015 season for the first time in ten years after failing to reach the CHA Championship for the first time in the program's history.

From 2017 to 2019, the Lakers enjoyed success, but contended with rival CHA program Robert Morris for conference leadership. The 2016–17 team posted a 15–18–4 record, their first and only losing record since NCAA competition began in 2001–02, as of the end of 2020. Their 3rd place CHA finish was the lowest ranking in Mercyhurst history, but still good enough for the team to stay in the top tier of the conference.

In the 2017–18 season, Mercyhurst began to establish a resurgence of top-tier success, with the recruitment of freshman Alexa Vasko and three international medalists from the Finnish national team: forwards Vilma Tanskanen (2018–19) and Emma Nuutinen (2017–20), and goaltender Jenna Silvonen (2019–22). Tanskanen and Nuutinen were transfers from the North Dakota Fighting Hawks women's ice hockey team, following the abrupt cancellation of the University of North Dakota‘s program. Nuutinen had the additional accomplishment of earning an Olympic bronze medal at the 2018 Winter Olympics.

Mercyhurst returned to the 2018 NCAA tournament. Despite an overall record of 18–15–4, the team had a strong conference record of 13–4–3 and beat Robert Morris in the CHA Championship to qualify to the tournament. The team lost in the quarterfinals to the eventual national champions, Clarkson University.

Mercyhurst received another berth to the 2020 NCAA tournament but this was cancelled due to the COVID-19 pandemic.

The team bolstered their goaltending and offensive depth adding Ena Nystrøm to the 2020–21 roster and Vanessa Upson to the 2021–22 roster. During the 2022–23 season, the Lakers achieved an overall winning record of .765, exceeding .700 for the first time since the 2014–15 season.

During the first half of the 2020s, the Lakers would continue to have moderate regular season success, often finishing second in the conference. However, they struggled in advancing past the CHA championship, losing to Penn State (who had joined the conference in 2012) in the championships in consecutive years, most recently in the 2025–26 season.

Vasko and Upson have both been drafted to the PWHL.

On November 28, 2025, head coach Michael Sisti won his 600th game. Defeating the Stonehill Skyhawks in a 6-1 final, it also marked the first meeting between the two teams. Similar to the milestone of his 500th win, Mark Johnson of Wisconsin is the only other coach with 600 wins in NCAA women's ice hockey.

== Season-by-season results ==
Source:

== Coaches ==
Current to the 2025–26 season

=== Current coaching staff ===
Name	Position	First Season
Michael Sisti	Head Coach	2000
Trey Flesch	Assistant Coach	2022
Scott Spencer	Assistant Coach	2025
Natasha Hawkins	Assistant Coach	2026

=== All-time coaching records ===
Tenure	Coach	Seasons	Record	Pct.
1999–present	Michael Sisti	27	613–262–69	.686

== Current roster ==
As of 9 October 2026

No.	Nat.	Player	Class	Pos	Height	DoB	Hometown	Previous team
1	(United States)	Lexington Secreto	Graduate	G	5' 7" (1.7 m)	2003-02-24	New Windsor, New York	Lindenwood University (AHA)
3	(Canada)	Halle Duchene	Freshman	F	5' 5" (1.65 m)	2008-06-11	Saskatoon, Saskatchewan	Saskatoon Stars (SFMAAAHL)
4	(Canada)	Sophie Erlam	Freshman	D	5' 8" (1.73 m)	2008-00-00	Edmonton, Alberta	Southern Alberta Hockey Academy (CSSHL)
6	(Canada)	Kate Donegan	Sophomore	F	5' 4" (1.63 m)	2006-11-00	Ashburn, Ontario	Whitby Wolves (OWHA U22)
8	(Sweden)	Sofia Ljung	Senior	D	5' 7" (1.7 m)	2004-01-23	Hudiksvall, Sweden	Brynäs IF (SDHL)
9	(Sweden)	Maja Ålenius	Sophomore	D	5' 10" (1.78 m)	2005-05-01	Gävle, Sweden	Brynäs IF (SDHL)
11	(United States)	Makayla Javier (C)	Graduate	F	5' 6" (1.68 m)	2003-12-01	Abingdon, Maryland	Philadelphia Jr. Flyers (JWHL)
12	(Canada)	Madison Nelson	Sophomore	F	5' 5" (1.65 m)	2007-00-00	Burlington, Ontario	Mississauga Hurricanes (OWHA U22)
13	(Canada)	Berlin Lolacher	Sophomore	F	5' 5" (1.65 m)	2007-10-31	Pilot Butte, Saskatchewan	Regina Rebels (SFMAAAHL)
15	(Sweden)	Julia Perjus	Sophomore (RS)	F	5' 8" (1.73 m)	2004-11-17	Stockholm, Sweden	MoDo Hockey (SDHL)
16	(Canada)	Henlee Mahoney	Senior	F	5' 7" (1.7 m)	2005-00-00	Niagara Falls, Ontario	Stoney Creek Sabres (OWHA U22)
18	(Canada)	Avery Bryk	Sophomore	F	5' 7" (1.7 m)	2007-00-00	Whitby, Ontario	Durham West Jr. Lightning (OWHA U22)
19	(Switzerland)	Sonja Inkamp	Freshman	D	5' 3" (1.6 m)	2007-02-21	Altendorf, Switzerland	HC Ambrì-Piotta (PFWL)
20	(Canada)	Zoe Cramer	Freshman	F	5' 5" (1.65 m)	2008-03-14	Carman, Manitoba	Shawnigan Lake School (CSSHL)
21	(Hungary)	Regina Metzler	Junior	F	5' 10" (1.78 m)	2005-10-25	Budapest, Hungary	OHA Mavericks (OWHA U22)
22	(Finland)	Sofia Nuutinen (A)	Senior	F	5' 7" (1.7 m)	2002-06-14	Vantaa, Finland	Kiekko-Espoo (Auroraliiga)
23	(Canada)	Lexi Stanat	Sophomore	D	5' 11" (1.8 m)	2006-01-04	St. Thomas, Ontario	Burlington Barracudas (OWHA U22)
24	(Russia)	Mariia Polozkova	Freshman	F	5' 8" (1.73 m)	2007-12-11	Moscow, Russia	New Hampshire Mountain Cats (19U AAA)
25	(Canada)	Kismet Dogan	Junior	F	5' 4" (1.63 m)	2006-05-22	Vancouver, British Columbia	Saint Anselm University (NEWHA)
26	(Canada)	Abby Poitras	Junior	D	5' 9" (1.75 m)	2006-02-07	Whitby, Ontario	Merrimack College (HEA)
27	(Canada)	Holly VanNetten	Sophomore	D	5' 8" (1.73 m)	2007-12-11	Simcoe, Ontario	Stoney Creek Sabres (OWHA U22)
29	(United States)	Lucy DeCoteau	Junior	F	5' 5" (1.65 m)	2006-00-00	Canton, New York	Saint Anselm University (NEWHA)
30	(Canada)	Grace Kipfer	Freshman	G	5' 9" (1.75 m)		Mitchell, Ontario	Stoney Creek Sabres (OWHA U22)
31	(Austria)	Magdalena Luggin	Junior	G	5' 9" (1.75 m)	2005-11-06	Vienna, Austria	SKN Sabres St. Pölten (EWHL)
34	(Canada)	Avery Norman	Junior	G	5' 6" (1.68 m)	2005-00-00	Nepean, Ontario	Nepean Wildcats (OWHA U22)

== Statistical leaders ==
Statistics current through the 2025–26 season.

=== Career points leaders ===
Name	Seasons	GP	G	A	PPts	Pts/Game	PIM
Meghan Agosta	2006–2011	134	157	145	303	2.25	118
Christine Bestland	2010–2014	143	92	134	226	1.60	153
Jesse Scanzano	2007–2011	141	85	140	225	1.60	270
Bailey Bram	2008–2012	130	87	114	201	1.55	176
Valérie Chouinard	2005–2009	140	90	108	198	1.41	84
Vicki Bendus	2007–2011	140	69	121	190	1.36	108
Jess Jones	2008–2012	136	61	93	154	1.13	94
Emily Janiga	2012–2016	141	72	79	151	1.07	159
Vanessa Upson	2021–2025	148	65	82	147	0.99	32
Jenna Dingeldein	2012–2016	144	62	77	139	0.97	152

=== Career goaltending leaders ===
GP = Games Played; TOI = Time on Ice; W = Wins; L = Losses, T = Ties; GA = Goals against; SO = Shutouts; SV% = Save percentage; GAA = Goals against average

Minimum 1000 minutes played

Player	Seasons	GP	TOI	W	L	T	GA	SO	SV%	GAA
Desirae Clark	2002–2005	90	5339:55	63	18	7	131	26	.932	1.47
Ena Nystrøm	2021–2024	104	5611:11	52	39	3	199	13	.929	2.13
Magdalena Luggin	2025–2026	47	2787:36	26	17	3	96	5	.929	2.07
Jorden Mattison	2025	22	1302:16	10	9	2	40	5	.929	1.84
Courtney Drennen	2006–2009	37	1860:34	26	4	2	44	8	.927	1.42
Stephanie Ciampa	2010–2013	31	1574:04	23	2	0	42	4	.927	1.60
Amber Natali	2000–2011	30	1976	19	9	3	54	10	.926	1.64
Amanda Mäkelä	2002–2015	84	4755:53	52	21	8	136	17	.925	1.72
Laura Hosier	2005–2008	105	6128:58	74	17	10	175	18	.917	1.71
Jenna Silvonen	2020–2022	39	1930:58	18	9	5	65	6	.917	2.02
Hillary Pattenden	2009–2012	126	7403:08	100	20	6	236	18	.914	1.91

=== Single-season records ===
Goals

Player	Season	GP	G
Meghan Agosta	2008–09	32	41
Meghan Agosta	2007–08	33	40
Meghan Agosta	2010–11	34	38
Meghan Agosta	2006–07	35	38
Kelly Steadman	2011–12	34	33

Assists

Player	Season	GP	A
Meghan Agosta	2010–11	34	47
Jesse Scanzano	2009–10	33	45
C.J. Ireland	1999–00	29	45
Christine Bestland	2012–13	37	44
Bailey Bram	2011–12	32	41

Points

Player	Season	GP	TP
Meghan Agosta	2010–11	34	85
Meghan Agosta	2008–09	32	78
Meghan Agosta	2006–07	35	74
Christine Bestland	2012–13	37	72
Bailey Bram	2011–12	32	68

Goaltending Minimum 30 games played

Player	Season	GP	SV%
Desirae Clark	2003–04	36	.937
Amanda Mäkelä	2014–15	31	.932
Ena Nystrøm	2023–24	38	.928
Magdalena Luggin	2025–26	31	.926
Amanda Mäkelä	2013–14	35	.925

== International ==
Tournament	Country	Player	Result
2007 World Championship	Canada	Meghan Agosta	Gold
2006 Olympics	Canada	Meghan Agosta	Gold
2008 World Championship	Canada	Meghan Agosta	Silver
2009 World Championship	Canada	Meghan Agosta	Silver
2010 Olympics	Canada	Meghan Agosta	Gold
2011 World Championship	United States	Kelley Steadman	Gold
2011 World Championship	Canada	Meghan Agosta	Silver
2012 World Championship	Canada	Meghan Agosta	Gold
2012 World Championship	Canada	Vicki Bendus	Gold
2012 World Championship	Canada	Bailey Bram	Gold
2013 World Championship	United States	Kelley Steadman	Gold
2013 World Championship	Canada	Meghan Agosta	Silver
2013 World Championship	Canada	Bailey Bram	Silver
2014 Olympics	Canada	Meghan Agosta	Gold
2014 Olympics	Finland	Vilma Tanksanen	
2015 World Championship	Canada	Bailey Bram	Silver
2015 World Championship	Finland	Vilma Tanskanen	Bronze
2016 World Championship	Canada	Meghan Agosta	Silver
2016 World Championship	Canada	Bailey Bram	Silver
2017 World Championship	Canada	Meghan Agosta	Silver
2017 World Championship	Canada	Bailey Bram	Silver
2018 Olympics	Canada	Meghan Agosta	Silver
2018 Olympics	Canada	Bailey Bram	Silver
2018 Olympics	Finland	Emma Nuutinen	Bronze
2019 World Championship	Finland	Emma Nuutinen	Silver
2019 World Championship	Finland	Jenna Silvonen	Silver
2021 World Championship	Finland	Jenna Silvonen	Bronze
2026 Olympics	Sweden	Thea Johansson	

== Awards and Honors ==
The CHA and AHA merged into a single conference for the 2024–25 season. Awards through the 2023–24 season were presented by the CHA and subsequent awards starting in the 2024–25 season were presented by the AHA.

=== AHA/CHA ===
==== Individual awards ====
Player of the Year

- Teresa Marchese: 2005
- Valerie Chouinard: 2006
- Meghan Agosta: 2007, 2008, 2009
- Vicki Bendus: 2010
- Meghan Agosta: 2011
- Kelley Steadman: 2012
- Christine Bestland: 2013, 2014
- Emily Janiga: 2015
- Emma Nuutinen: 2020

Defenseman of the Year

- Cassea Schols: 2011
- Molly Byrne: 2012, 2014, 2015
- Sydney Pedersen: 2024

Best Defensive Forward

- Jess Jones: 2012
- Shelby Bram: 2014
- Sarah Hine: 2019
- Alexa Vasko: 2020
- Kylee Mahoney: 2024

Goaltending Champion

CHA Conference play only

- Tiffany Ribble: 2003
- Desirae Clark: 2004, 2005
- Laura Hosier: 2006, 2007, 2008
- Hillary Pattenden: 2009, 2010, 2011
- Stephanie Ciampa: 2013
- Amanda Makela: 2015
- Sarah McDonnell: 2016
- Kennedy Blair: 2018

Goaltender of the Year

- Ena Nystrøm: 2023, 2024

Rookie of the Year

- Samantha Shirley: 2003
- Valerie Chouinard: 2006
- Meghan Agosta: 2007
- Vicki Bendus: 2008
- Bailey Bram: 2009
- Rachel Smith: 2016
- Vanessa Upson: 2022
- Julia Schalin: 2025

Individual Sportsmanship Award

- K.K. Thiessen (2022)
- Liliane Perreault (2023)
- Vanessa Upson (2024)
- Marielle Parks (2025)

Scoring Champion

- Teresa Marchese: 2005
- Valerie Chouinard: 2006
- Meghan Agosta: 2007, 2009
- Vicki Bendus: 2010
- Meghan Agosta: 2011
- Kelley Steadman: 2012
- Christine Bestland: 2013, 2014
- Emily Janiga: 2015
- Vanessa Upson: 2022

Coach of the Year

- Mike Sisti: 2003, 2005, 2009, 2011, 2014, 2016, 2018, 2020

Team Sportsmanship Award

- 2021–2022
- 2024–2025
- 2025–2026

Tournament MVP

- 2004: Desi Clark
- 2005: Teresa Marchese
- 2006: Valerie Chouinard
- 2007: Meghan Agosta
- 2008: Meghan Agosta
- 2009: Jesse Scanzano
- 2010: Ashley Cockell
- 2011: Meghan Agosta
- 2013: Stephanie Ciampa
- 2016: Jenna Dingeldein
- 2018: Emma Nuutinen
- 2020: Kennedy Blair

==== All-Conference Teams ====
All-Conference First Team

- 2002–03: C.J. Ireland, Jennifer Jeffrey, Sara McDonald
- 2003–04: Desi Clark, Danielle Lansing, Teresa Marchese-Del Monte, Brittany Millar, Samantha Shirley
- 2004–05: Michelle Bonello, Desi Clark, Teresa Marchese-Del Monte, Ashley Pendleton
- 2005–06: Valerie Chouinard, Danielle Lansing, Ashley Pendleton
- 2006–07: Meghan Agosta, Valerie Chouinard, Natalie Payne, Ashley Pendleton
- 2007–08: Meghan Agosta, Natalie Payne
- 2008–09: Meghan Agosta, Ashley Cockell
- 2009–10: Vicki Bendus, Bailey Bram, Melissa Lacroix, Jesse Scanzano, Cassea Schols
- 2010–11: Meghan Agosta, Vicki Bendus, Cassea Schols, Pamela Zgoda
- 2011–12: Christine Bestland, Bailey Bram, Molly Bryne, Kelley Steadman, Jill Szandzik
- 2012–13: Christine Bestland, Shelby Bram, Vaila Higson, Emily Janiga
- 2013–14: Christine Bestland, Molly Bryne, Emily Janiga
- 2014–15: Molly Bryne, Emily Janiga
- 2017–18: Vilma Tanskanen
- 2018–19: Maggie LaGue, Emma Nuutinen
- 2019–20: Emma Nuutinen, Michelle Robillard
- 2021–22: Vanessa Upson
- 2022–23: Ena Nystrøm
- 2023–24: Sara Boucher, Ena Nystrøm, Sydney Pedersen
- 2024–25: Vanessa Upson

All-Conference Second Team

- 2002–03: Britney Millar, Randi Pilger
- 2004–05: Stefanie Bourbeau, Samantha Shirley
- 2005–06: Stefanie Bourbeau, Julia Colizza
- 2006–07: Michelle Bonello, Julia Colizza
- 2007–08: Valerie Chouinard
- 2008–09: Valerie Chouinard, Hillary Pattenden, Jesse Scanzano, Cassea Schols
- 2010–11: Bailey Bram, Hillary Pattenden, Jesse Scanzano
- 2011–12: Jess Jones
- 2012–13: Molly Byrne
- 2013–14: Christie Cicero
- 2014–15: Jenna Dingeldein
- 2015–16: J'nai Mahadeo
- 2016–17: Brooke Hartwick, Jillian Skinner
- 2017–18: Maggie Knott
- 2019–20: Sam Isbell, Maggie Knott
- 2020–21: Sara Boucher, Rachel Marmen, Alexa Vasko
- 2021–22: Sara Boucher, Ena Nystrøm, K.K. Thiessen
- 2022–23: Sara Boucher, Thea Johansson, Sydney Pedersen, Vanessa Upson
- 2023–24: Vanessa Upson
- 2024–25: Megan McKay
- 2025–26: Payten Evans, Julia Perjus

All- Conference Rookie Team

- 2002–03: Danielle Lansing, Samantha Shirley
- 2003–04: Michelle Bonello, Ashley Pendleton
- 2004–05: Stephanie Jones
- 2005–06: Valerie Chouinard
- 2006–07: Meghan Agosta
- 2007–08: Vicki Bendus, Geena Prough, Jesse Scanzano, Cassea Schols
- 2008–09: Bailey Bram, Jess Jones, Hillary Pattenden
- 2009–10: Samantha Watt
- 2010–11: Christine Bestland
- 2011–12: Molly Byrne
- 2012–13: Jenna Dingeldein, Emily Janiga, Lauren Kilroy
- 2013–14: Jillian Skinner
- 2014–15: Sarah Robello
- 2015–16: Molly Blasen, Sarah McDonnell, Rachel Smith
- 2016–17: Maggie Knott
- 2017–18: Kennedy Blair
- 2020–21: Sara Boucher
- 2021–22: Sydney Pedersen, Vanessa Upson
- 2022–23: Thea Johansson, Megan McKay
- 2023–24: Sofia Ljung, Sofia Nuutinen
- 2024–25: Magdalena Luggin, Julia Schalin
- 2025–26: Julia Perjus

CHA/AHA All-American First Team

- 2005: Desi Clark
- 2007: Meghan Agosta
- 2008: Meghan Agosta
- 2009: Meghan Agosta
- 2010: Vick Bendus
- 2011: Meghan Agosta
- 2014: Christine Bestland

CHA/AHA All-American Second Team

- 2010: Jesse Scanzano

All-Tournament Team

- 2003: Jennifer Jeffrey, Tiffany Ribble, Samantha Shirley, Chrissy Yule
- 2004: Michelle Bonello, Stefanie Bourbeau, Danielle Lansing
- 2005: Danielle Avearst, Stefanie Bourbeau, Danielle Lansing, Sara McDonald
- 2006: Stefanie Bourbeau, Julia Colizza, Danielle Lansing
- 2007: Michelle Bonello, Valerie Chouinard, Melissa Dianoski
- 2008: Laura Hosier, Stephanie Jones
- 2009: Meghan Agosta, Jess Jones, Hillary Pattenden, Geena Prough
- 2010: Bailey Bram, Ashley Cockell, Melissa Lacroix, Jesse Scanzano
- 2011: Meghan Agosta
- 2012: Christine Bestland, Pamela Zgoda
- 2013: Christine Bestland, Stephanie Ciampa, Stephanie DeSutter, Lauren Jones
- 2014: Shelby Brahm, Kayleigh Chippy, J'nai Mahadeo
- 2016: Jenna Dingeldein, Sarah McDonnell
- 2018: Kennedy Blair, Rachel Marmen, Emma Nuutinen
- 2020: Kennedy Blair, Summer-Rae Dobson, Jordan Mortlock
- 2022: Sara Boucher
- 2023: Makayla Javier, Liliane Perreault
- 2024: Sofia Ljung, Vanessa Upson
- 2025: Makayla Javier, Vanessa Upson
- 2026: Abby Poitras

=== NCAA awards ===
==== Patty Kazmaier Memorial Award ====
Winner

- Vicki Bendus: (2010)

Top 3 Finalist

- Meghan Agosta (2007)
- Meghan Agosta (2008)
- Meghan Agosta (2009)
- Meghan Agosta (2011)

Top 10 Finalist

- Desi Clark (2005)
- Bailey Bram (2010)

==== Frozen Four All-Tournament Team ====
- Meghan Agosta (2009)

=== ACHA awards ===
First Team—All American

- 2005 – Desi Clark, G
- 2007 – Meghan Agosta, F
- 2008 – Meghan Agosta, F
- 2009 – Meghan Agosta, F
- 2010 – Vicki Bendus, f
- 2011 – Meghan Agosta, F

Second Team—All American

- 2010 — Jesse Scanzano, F
- 2014 — Christine Bestland, F

Coach of the Year

- 2015 — Mike Sisti

=== USCHO honors ===
USCHO First Team

- 2007 – Meghan Agosta

USCHO Third Team

- 2013 – Christine Bestland
- 2014 – Christine Bestland

USCHO All Rookie Team

- 2005 – Laura Hosier
- 2007 – Meghan Agosta

USCHO Rookie of the Year

- 2006 – Valerie Chouinard
- 2007 – Meghan Agosta
- 2022 – Vanessa Upson

USCHO Coach of the Year

- 2007 – Michael Sisti

== Statistical leaders ==
=== NCAA Statistical leaders ===
- Most short-handed goals in a season: Meghan Agosta, 7 (2007–08)(tied)
- Most points in a career: Meghan Agosta, 303 (2006–09, 2010–11)
- Most goals in a career: Meghan Agosta, 157 (2006–09, 2010–11)
- Most power goals in a career: Meghan Agosta, 55 (2006–09, 2010–11)
- Most short handed goals in a career: Meghan Agosta, 20 (2006–09, 2010–11)
- Most game winning goals in a career: Meghan Agosta, 39 (2006–09, 2010–11)
- Most saves in a game: Desi Clark, 78 (vs. Harvard, 03/19/2005)

=== CHA statistical leaders ===
==== CHA Regular season statistical leaders ====
Current up to the 2023–24 season. Source:

Career

- Most goals in a career: Meghan Agosta, 157, (2006–09, 2010–11)
- Most assists in a career: Meghan Agosta, 146, (2006–09, 2010–11)
- Most points in a career: Meghan Agosta, 303, (2006–09, 2010–11)
- Most hat tricks in a career: Meghan Agosta, 14 (2006–09, 2010–11)
- Most career power play goals: Meghan Agosta, 55 (2006–09, 2010–11)
- Most shorthanded goals: Meghan Agosta, 20 (2006–09, 2010–11)
- Most career game winning goals: Meghan Agosta, 39 (2006–09, 2010–11)
- Most goals per game in a career (min. 100 games played): Meghan Agosta, 1.17 (2006–09, 2010–11)
- Most assists per game in a career (min. 100 games played): Meghan Agosta, 1.09 (2006–09, 2010–11)
- Most points per game in a career (min. 100 games played): Meghan Agosta, 2.28 (2006–09, 2010–11)
- Most assists in a career, defenseman: Molly Byrne, 97 (2011–15)
- Most points in a career, defenseman: Molly Byrne, 117 (2011–15)
- Most points per game in a career, defenseman (min. 100 games played): Molly Byrne, 0.81 (2011–15)
- Most Games played in a career, goaltender: Hillary Pattenden, 126 (2008–12)
- Most minutes played in a career, goaltender: Hillary Pattenden, 7403:08 (2008–12)
- Most wins in a career: Hillary Pattenden, 100 (2008–12)
- Best win percentage in a career: Hillary Pattenden, .817 (2008–12)
- Best goals against average in a career (minimum 33% team minutes played): Desirae Clark, 1.40 (2002–05)

Career — CHA

- Most goals in a career, within conference: Meghan Agosta, 67 (2006–09, 2010–11)
- Most assists in a career, within conference: Meghan Agosta, 65, (2006–09, 2010–11) and Jesse Scanzano, 65 (2007–11)
- Most career points in a career, within conference: Meghan Agosta, 132 (2006–09, 2010–11)
- Most power play goals in a career, within conference: Meghan Agosta, 25 (2006–09, 2010–11)
- Most shorthanded goals in a career, within conference: Meghan Agosta, 9 (2006–09, 2010–11)
- Most game winning goals in a career, within conference: Meghan Agosta, 16 (2006–09, 2010–11)
- Most goals per game in a career, within conference (min. 40 games played): Meghan Agosta, 1.29 (2006–09, 2010–11)
- Most points per game in a career, within conference: Meghan Agosta, 2.54 (2006–09, 2010–11)
- Most points in a career, within conference, defenseman: Molly Byrne, 74 (2011–15)
- Most points per game in a career, within conference, defenseman (min. 40 games played): Molly Byrne, 1.03 (2011–15)
- Most wins in a career, within conference: Hillary Pattenden, 47 (2008–12)
- Best goals against average in a career, within conference (min. 33% team minutes played): Desirae Clark, 1.16 (2002–05)
- Most shutouts in a career, within conference: Sarah McDonnell, 10 (2015–19)

Season

- Most goals in a season: Meghan Agosta, 27 (2009)
- Most assists in a season: Meghan Agosta, 48 (2011)
- Most points in a season: Meghan Agosta, 86 (2011)
- Most consecutive games scoring one or more goals in a season: Meghan Agosta, 13 (2007)
- Most power play goals in a season: Valerie Chouinard, 17 (2007)
- Most shorthanded goals in a season: Meghan Agosta, 7 (2008)
- Most goals per game in a season (min. 50% games played): Meghan Agosta, 1.28 (2009)
- Most assists per game in a season (min. 50% games played): Meghan Agosta, 1.41 (2011)
- Most points per game in a season (min. 50% games played): Meghan Agosta, 2.53 (2011)
- Most hat tricks in a season: Meghan Agosta, 5 (2009)
- Most shots on goal in a season (since 2012–13): Christie Cicero, 215 (2014)
- Most assists in a season, defenseman: Molly Byrne, 28 (2012)
- Most goals in a season, freshman: Meghan Agosta, 38 (2007)
- Most assists in a season, freshman: Meghan Agosta, 36 (2007)
- Most points in a season, freshman: Meghan Agosta, 74 (2007)
- Most points per game in a season, freshman (min. 50% games played): Meghan Agosta, 2.11 (2007)
- Most wins in a season: Hillary Pattenden, 29 (2010)
- Best winning percentage in a season (min. 40% of team minutes played): Stephanie Ciampa, .909 (2013)
- Best goals against average in a season (min. 40% team minutes played): Desirae Clark, 1.25 (2005)

Season — CHA

- Most points in a season, within conference: Meghan Agosta, 49 (2009)
- Most power play goals in a season, within conference: Emily Janiga, 9 (2015), Christine Bestland, 9 (2013), and Meghan Agosta, 9 (2009)
- Most game-winning goals in a season, within conference: Jenna Dingeldin, 6 (2015)
- Most goals per game in a season, within conference (min. 50% games played): Meghan Agosta, 1.69 (2009)
- Most points per game in a season, within conference (min. 50% games played): Meghan Agosta, 3.06 (2009)
- Most assists in a season, within conference, defenseman: Molly Byrne, 19 (2013)
- Most points per game in a season, within conference, freshman (min. 50% games played): Meghan Agosta, 2.25 (2007)
- Best winning percentage, within conference, in a season (min. 40% team minutes played): Hillary Pattenden, 1.000 (2009, 2011), Tiffany Ribble, 1.000 (2003), Desirae Clark, 1.000 (2003), and Laura Hosier, 1.000 (2005)
- Best goals against average, within conference, in a season (min. 40% team minutes played): Desirae Clark, 0.65 (2005)
- Best save percentage, within conference, in a season (min. 40% team minutes played): Desirae Clark, .961 (2005)
- Most shutouts, within conference, in a season: Kennedy Blair, 5 (2018) and Elijah Milne-Price, 5 (2018)

Game

- Most shots on goal in a game: Sara Boucher, 14 (at RIT, 11/20/2021)

Game — CHA

- Most shots on goal in a game, within conference: Sara Boucher, 14 (at RIT, 11/20/2021)

Period

- Most goals in a period: Chantal Ste-Croix, 3 (at RIT, 11/19/2021)(tied)

Game — CHA

- Most goals in a period, within conference: Chantal Ste-Croix, 3 (at RIT, 11/19/2021)(tied)

Coaching Records

- Most games coached in a career: Mike Sisti, 736 (2002–Present)
- Most wins in a career: Mike Sisti, 489 (2002–Present)
- Best winning percentage (min. two seasons): Mike Sisti, .704 (2002–Present)

Coaching Records — CHA

- Most games coached in a career, within conference: Mike Sisti, 235 (2002–Present)
- Most wins in a career, within conference: Mike Sisti, 252 (2002–Present)
- Best winning percentage, within conference, (min. two seasons): Mike Sisti, .792 (2002–Present)

==== CHA Post Season statistical leaders ====
Source:Source:

Career

- Most career goals in the post season: Meghan Agosta, 11 (2006–09, 2010–11)
- Most career assists in the post season: Jesse Scanzano, 15 (2007–11)
- Most career points in the post season: Meghan Agosta, 21 (2006–09, 2010–11)
- Most career power play goals, in the post season: Valerie Chouinard, 6 (2005–09)
- Most career power play points, in the post season: Jesse Scanzano, 6 (2007–11)(tied)
- Most career post season hat tricks: Stefanie Bourbeau, 2 (2004–07)(tied)

Single Tournament

- Most goals in a single tournament: Valerie Chouinard, 5 (2006)
- Most assists in a single tournament: Jesse Scanzano, 5 (2010, 2009), Stefanie Bourbeau, 5 (2006)
- Most assists in a single tournament, freshman: Valerie Chouinard, 5 (2006)
- Best goals against average in a single tournament: Tiffany Ribble, 0.00 (2003)
- Best save percentage in a single tournament: Tiffany Ribble, 1.000 (2003)
- Most shutouts in a single tournament: Tiffany Ribble, 2 (2003)

Game

- Most assists in a post season game: Jesse Scanzano, 4 (vs. Robert Morris, SF)(3/5/2010)
- Most points in a post season game: Meghan Agosta, 5 (vs. Niagara, SF)(3/6/2009)(tied)

Period

- Most points in a post season period: Meghan Agosta, 3 (vs. Niagara, SF)(3/6/2009)(tied)
- Most power play goals in a post season period: Valerie Chouinard, 2 (vs. Robert Morris, SF)(3/9/2006) and Stefanie Bourbeau, 2 (vs. Quinnipiac, SF)(3/12/2005)

== Lakers in professional hockey ==
- NOTE: Kylie Rossler became an American football player with the Regina Rage of the Lingerie Football League (rebranded as Legends Football League in 2013).

= CWHL All-Star	= NWHL All-Star	= Clarkson Cup Champion	= Isobel Cup Champion	= Walter Cup Champion

Player	Position	Team(s)	League(s)	Years	Championship(s)
Taylor Accursi	Forward	Buffalo Beauts	PHF	2017–22	
Taylor Accursi	Forward	Boston Pride	PHF	2022–23	
Meghan Agosta	Forward	Montreal Stars	CWHL	2011–13	1 (2012)
Emily Berzins	Forward	Calgary Inferno	CWHL	2013–15	
Christine Bestland	Forward	Melbourne Ice	AWIHL	2014–15	
Michelle Bonello	Defense	Vaughan Flames	CWHL	2007–08	
Michelle Bonello	Defense	Toronto Furies	CWHL	2010–16	1 (2014)
Bailey Bram	Forward	Brampton Thunder	CWHL	2012–13	
Bailey Bram	Forward	Linköping HC	SDHL	2013–14	
Bailey Bram	Forward	Calgary Inferno	CWHL	2014–2018	1 (2016)
Shelby Bram	Forward	Buffalo Beauts	NWHL	2015–16	
Shelby Bram	Forward	Brynäs IF	SDHL	2016–17	
Shelby Bram	Forward	Kölner Haie	DEL	2024–25	
Harrison Browne	Defense	Buffalo Beauts	NWHL	2015–17	
Harrison Browne	Defense	Metropolitan Riveters	NWHL	2017–18	1 (2018)
Vicki Bendus	Forward	Brampton Thunder	CWHL	2011–15	
Valérie Chouinard	Forward	Montreal Axion	NWHL	2004–05	
Ashley Cockell	Forward/ Defense	Alberta Honeybadgers	CWHL	2011–12	
Katherine Donohue	Forward	Buffalo Beauts	NWHL	2017–18	
Laura Hosie	Goaltender	Brampton Thunder	CWHL	2008–12	
CJ Ireland	Forward	Ottawa Capital Canucks	CWHL	2007–08	
Emily Janiga	Forward	Buffalo Beauts	NWHL	2016–17, 2018–19	
Emily Janiga	Forward	Vanke Rays	CWHL	2017–18	
Emily Janiga	Forward	Independent	PWHPA	2019–20	
Emily Janiga	Forward	Metropolitan Riveters	PHF	2020–22	
Jackie Jarrell	Forward	Durham Lightning	NWHL	2002–03	
Thea Johansson	Forward	HV71	SHL	2016–22, 2026–27	
Jess Jones	Forward	HK Pantera Minsk	EWHL	2012–13	
Jess Jones	Forward	Brampton Thunder	CWHL	2013–17	
Jess Jones	Forward	Buffalo Beauts	NWHL	2017–18	
Jess Jones	Forward	Markham Thunder	CWHL	2018–19	
Jess Jones	Forward	Independent	PWHPA	2019–2021	
Jess Jones	Forward	Toronto	PWHP	2021–23	
Jess Jones	Forward	PWHL Toronto	PWHL	2023–24	
Amanda Makela	Goaltender	Buffalo Beauts	NWHL	2015–16	
Amanda Makela	Goaltender	Toronto Furies	CWHL	2017–19	
Amanda Makela	Goaltender	Toronto	PWHPA	2019–22	
Amanda Makela	Goaltender	IF Björklöven	Damettan	2021–22	
Amanda Makela	Goaltender	Team Scotiabank	PWHPA	2022–23	
Johanna Malmström	Defense	Brynäs IF	SDHL	2001–06, 2011–15	
Johanna Malmström	Defense	Almtuna IS	Division 1	2014–15	
Johanna Malmström	Defense	Sandvikens IK	NDHL	2015–17	
Emma Nuutinen	Forward	Kiekko-Espoo	NSM	2011–16, 2020–21, 2023–26	
Emma Nuutinen	Forward	Seattle Torrent	PWHL	2026–27	
Ena Nystrøm	Goaltender	Brynäs IF	SDHL	2024–27	
Ashley Pendleton	Defense	Vaughan Flames	CWHL	2007–08	
Ashley Pendleton	Defense	Brampton Thunder	CWHL	2008–14	
Jesse Scanzano	Forward	Montreal Axion	NWHL	2004–06	
Jesse Scanzano	Forward	Toronto Furies	CWHL	2011–12	
Jesse Scanzano	Forward	Montreal Stars	CWHL	2012–13	
Jesse Scanzano	Forward	Brampton Thunder	CWHL	2014–16	
Katariina Soikkanen	Defence	Espoo Blues	NSML	2002–08	
Kelley Steadman	Forward	Boston Blades	CWHL	2012–13	1 (2013)
Kelley Steadman	Forward	HC Tornado	RWHL	2013–14	
Kelley Steadman	Forward	Buffalo Beauts	NWHL	2015–17	1 (2017)
Vilma Tanskanen	Forward	Team Oriflame Kuortane	NSML	2011–15	
Vilma Tanskanen	Forward	Linköping HC	SDHL	2019–20	
Vanessa Upson	Forward	Minnesota Frost	PWHL	2025–26	

NOTE: Hillary Pattenden was the first overall selection in the 2012 CWHL Draft but never appeared in the league.

== See also ==
- List of college women's ice hockey coaches with 250 wins (Michael Sisti ranks seventh on all-time list)
- Mercyhurst Lakers men's ice hockey
