= Thea Johansson =

Swedish ice hockey player (born 2002)

- Born: 22 November 2002 (age 23) Ljungby, Sweden
- Height: 171 cm (5 ft 7 in)
- Weight: 67 kg (148 lb; 10 st 8 lb)
- Position: Forward
- Shoots: Left
- WCHA team Former teams: Minnesota Duluth; HV71
- National team: Sweden
- Playing career: 2017–present
Medal record
World Championship
Bronze medal – third place	2026 Denmark

Thea Johansson (born 22 November 2002) is a Swedish college ice hockey forward for Minnesota Duluth of the National Collegiate Athletic Association (NCAA) and the Sweden women's national ice hockey team. She previously played for Mercyhurst and HV71 of the Swedish Women's Hockey League (SDHL). She was drafted by the Vancouver Goldeneyes in the 2026 PWHL Draft.

== Early life ==
Johansson was born to Morgan and Katarina Johansson and has one brother, Valter.

== Playing career ==
Johansson began her career with HV71 of the SDHL and made her debut during the 2016–17 season at 14 years old. During the 2021–22 season, in her final season in Sweden, she served as alternate captain and recorded a career-high seven goals and 12 assists in 36 regular season games. She appeared in 170 regular season games with HV71 during her career.

She began her collegiate career at Mercyhurst during the 2022–23 season. During her freshman year, she recorded 16 goals and 20 assists in 37 games. On 22 November 2022, she recorded her first career hat-trick against St. Lawrence. She finished the month of November with four goals and one assist and was named the CHA Rookie of the Month. Following the season she was named to the All-CHA second team and All-CHA rookie team.

During the 2023–24 season, in her sophomore year, she recorded a team-high 19 goals and 11 assists in 36 games. During September 2023, she recorded four goals and three assists for seven points to lead the CHA in goals and points. She was subsequently named the CHA Forward of the Month. During the 2024–25 season, in her junior year, she recorded a team-high 16 goals and 12 assists in 36 games.

On 29 April 2025, she transferred to Minnesota Duluth. In three seasons at Mercyhurst she recorded 51 goals and 43 assists in 109 games.

On 17 June 2026, she was drafted in the second round, 17th overall, by the Vancouver Goldeneyes in the 2026 PWHL Draft.

== International play ==
Johansson represented Sweden at the 2018 IIHF U18 Women's World Championship where she recorded one goal in five games and won a silver medal. She again competed at the 2019 and 2020 IIHF U18 Women's World Championship.

She made her senior national team debut for Sweden during 2022 IIHF Women's World Championship. She again represented Sweden at the 2024 and 2025 IIHF Women's World Championship.

On 12 January 2026, she was named to Sweden's roster to compete at the 2026 Winter Olympics. She led Sweden in scoring with four goals and three assists in seven games. During the bronze medal game against Switzerland, she recorded an assist in a 2–1 overtime loss.

On 20 October 2026, she was selected to represent Sweden at the 2026 IIHF Women's World Championship. She recorded two goals in seven games to help Sweden win their first IIHF Women's World Championship medal since 2007.

== Career statistics ==
=== Regular season and playoffs ===
			Regular season					Playoffs
Season	Team	League	GP	G	A	Pts	PIM	GP	G	A	Pts	PIM
2016–17	HV71	SDHL	8	0	2	2	2	4	0	0	0	0
2017–18	HV71	SDHL	25	1	2	3	4	2	0	0	0	0
2018–19	HV71	SDHL	32	0	1	1	6	7	2	0	2	4
2019–20	HV71	SDHL	33	3	3	6	8	6	0	1	1	2
2020–21	HV71	SDHL	36	6	10	16	20	5	0	0	0	0
2021–22	HV71	SDHL	36	7	12	19	14	6	2	1	3	10
2022–23	Mercyhurst University	CHA	37	16	20	36	16	—	—	—	—	—
2023–24	Mercyhurst University	CHA	36	19	11	30	37	—	—	—	—	—
2024–25	Mercyhurst University	AHA	36	16	12	28	24	—	—	—	—	—
2025–26	University of Minnesota Duluth	WCHA	30	17	6	23	25	—	—	—	—	—
SDHL totals			170	17	30	47	54	30	4	2	6	20

=== International ===
Year	Team	Event	Result	GP	G	A	Pts	PIM
2018	Sweden	U18	2nd place, silver medalist(s)	5	1	0	1	0
2019	Sweden	U18	5th	5	1	0	1	2
2020	Sweden	U18	5th	5	2	0	2	2
2022	Sweden	WC	7th	6	0	1	1	6
2024	Sweden	WC	7th	5	1	0	1	4
2025	Sweden	WC	6th	6	1	0	1	0
2026	Sweden	OG	4th	7	4	3	7	8
2026	Sweden	WC	3rd place, bronze medalist(s)	7	2	0	2	2
Junior totals				15	4	0	4	4
Senior totals				31	8	4	12	20
