= Vanessa Upson =

Canadian ice hockey player (born 2003)

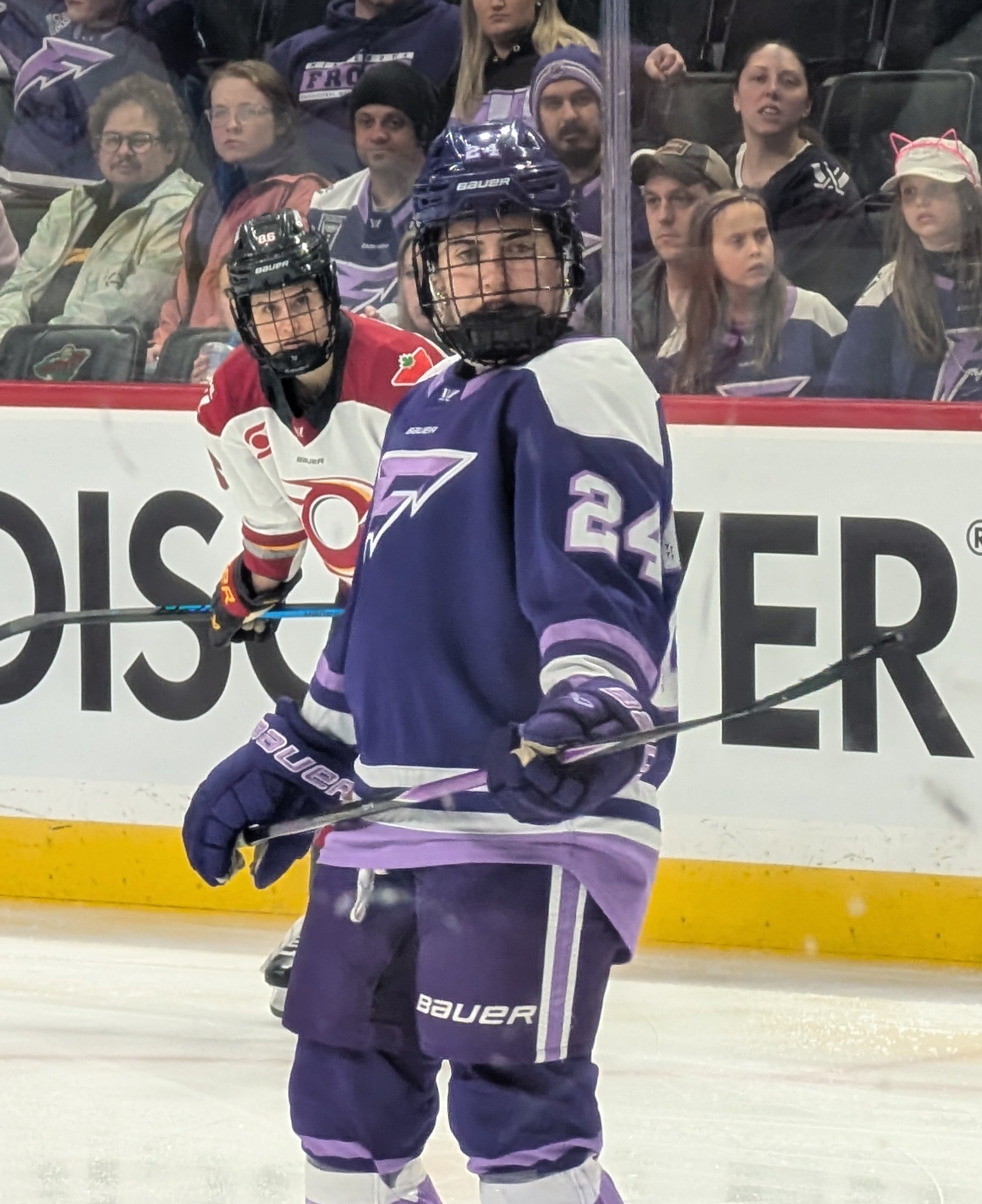
- Upson with the Minnesota Frost
- Born: November 18, 2003 (age 22) Stoney Creek, Ontario, Canada
- Height: 5 ft 5 in (165 cm)
- Weight: 135 lb (61 kg; 9 st 9 lb)
- Position: Forward
- Shoots: Left
- PWHL team: Minnesota Frost
- Playing career: 2025–present

Vanessa Upson (born November 18, 2003) is a Canadian ice hockey player who is a forward for the Minnesota Frost of the Professional Women's Hockey League (PWHL).

She played college ice hockey for the Mercyhurst Lakers from 2021 to 2025, totaling 147 points in 148 games. Upson was selected in the fifth round, 38th overall, by the Minnesota Frost in the 2025 PWHL Draft.

== Early life ==
Upson is from Stoney Creek, Ontario. She played minor hockey with the Hamilton Jr. Bulldogs of the OMHA, winning a gold medal in 2012 and a bronze medal in 2013.

She attended St. John Henry Newman high school, playing on numerous sports teams, including the Cardinal Newman girls' hockey team. She played club hockey with the AA U22 Stoney Creek Sabres in the Provincial Women's Hockey League. With the Sabres, she scored a goal in the third round of the shootout to help the team win the bronze medal at the 2019 Esso Cup. Upson was named an alternate captain for the 2020–21 season.

Her youth highlights include participation with Team Ontario at the Ontario Summer Games, an invitation to a Hockey Canada U18 summer camp.

As a grade 12 honour roll student, she committed to Mercyhurst University.

== Playing career ==
=== College ===
Prior to her 2021–22 freshman season, she was voted as CHA Preseason Co-Rookie of the year. Upson led Mercyhurst with 39 points (19 goals, 20 assists) in 35 games and was named USCHO National Rookie of the Year and CHA Rookie of the Year. She earned All-CHA First Team and CHA All-Rookie Team honors, and was selected to the USCHO All-Rookie Team and named USCHO Rookie of the Year. She led all NCAA Division I freshmen in points, goals, and assists and was named CHA Rookie of the month four times and CHA Forward of the Month twice. She was named CHA Forward of the Week three times and Rookie of the Week twice.

She posted 28 points (16 goals, 12 assists) in 37 games as a sophomore in 2022–23.

In 2023–24 she was named an alternate captain and recorded 37 points (17 goals, 20 assists) in 38 games, earned CHA All-Tournament Team honors, won the conference’s Individual Sportsmanship Award, and tied a CHA postseason single-game record with five points in a semifinal game.

Upson was named captain in her 2024–25 senior year, After the CHA transitioned to Atlantic Hockey America (AHA), Upson led Mercyhurst with 43 points (13 goals, 30 assists) in 38 games, topping the league in assists. She was named First Team All-AHA and the league’s January Player of the Month.

=== Professional ===
On June 24, 2025, the Minnesota Frost selected Upson with the 38th pick in the 2025 PWHL Draft. Following pre-season training camp, she signed a one-year contract with the Frost prior to the 2025–26 season.

== Career statistics ==
			Regular season					Playoffs
Season	Team	League	GP	G	A	Pts	PIM	GP	G	A	Pts	PIM
2021–22	Mercyhurst University	CHA	35	19	20	39	8	—	—	—	—	—
2022–23	Mercyhurst University	CHA	37	16	12	28	12	—	—	—	—	—
2023–24	Mercyhurst University	CHA	38	17	20	37	8	—	—	—	—	—
2024–25	Mercyhurst University	AHA	38	13	30	43	4	—	—	—	—	—
2025–26	Minnesota Frost	PWHL	28	0	1	1	0	5	0	0	0	0
NCAA totals			148	65	82	147	32	—	—	—	—	—
PWHL totals			28	0	1	1	0	5	0	0	0	0

Source: College Hockey Inc.; HockeyDB; Mercyhurst Athletics.

== Awards and honours ==
College Awards
Honour	Year(s)	Ref.
USCHO National Rookie of the Year	2022	
CHA Rookie of the Year	2022	
All-CHA First Team	2022	
CHA All-Rookie Team	2022	
USCHO All-Rookie Team	2022	
CHA Individual Sportsmanship Award	2024	
CHA All-Tournament Team	2024	
First Team All-AHA	2025	
