= NCAA Division I women's ice hockey tournament appearances by school =

The following is a list of teams that have made appearances in the NCAA women's ice hockey tournament (officially known as the National Collegiate Women's Ice Hockey Championship) listed by their conference. The championship has existed since the 2000–2001 season and groups include the university teams of Divisions I and II of the NCAA. Selections for the 2020 NCAA National Collegiate women's ice hockey tournament were held but the tournament was ultimately cancelled. From 2001 to 2004, only four teams were selected to play in the tournament. From 2005 until 2021, eight teams were selected for the tournament that played against each other in the National Quarterfinal round for the right to play in the Frozen Four. In 2022, the tournament expanded to eleven teams, with six teams playing against each other to reach the National Quarterfinals.

== Tournament appearances ==
NCAA women's Division I ice hockey tournament
School	Tournament appearances	Tournament years	Best result
Minnesota	23	2002, 2003, 2004, 2005, 2006, 2008, 2009, 2010, 2011, 2012, 2013, 2014, 2015, 2016, 2017, 2018, 2019, ~~2020~~, 2022, 2023, 2024, 2025, 2026	Champions (2004, 2005, 2012, 2013, 2015, 2016)
Wisconsin	20	2005, 2006, 2007, 2008, 2009, 2011, 2012, 2014, 2015, 2016, 2017, 2018, 2019, ~~2020~~, 2021, 2022, 2023, 2024, 2025, 2026	Champions (2006, 2007, 2009, 2011, 2019, 2021, 2023, 2025, 2026)
Minnesota Duluth	17	2001, 2002, 2003, 2005, 2006, 2007, 2008, 2009, 2010, 2011, 2017, 2021, 2022, 2023, 2024, 2025, 2026	Champions (2001, 2002, 2003, 2008, 2010)
Mercyhurst	13	2005, 2006, 2007, 2008, 2009, 2010, 2011, 2012, 2013, 2014, 2016, 2018, ~~2020~~	Runners-Up (2009)
Clarkson	13	2010, 2013, 2014, 2015, 2016, 2017, 2018, 2019, ~~2020~~, 2022, 2023, 2024, 2025	Champions (2014, 2017, 2018)
Boston College	12	2007, 2009, 2011, 2012, 2013, 2014, 2015, 2016, 2017, 2018, 2019, 2021	Runners-Up (2016)
Harvard	12	2001, 2003, 2004, 2005, 2006, 2007, 2008, 2010, 2013, 2014, 2015, 2022	Runners-Up (2003, 2004, 2005, 2015)
St. Lawrence	11	2001, 2004, 2005, 2006, 2007, 2008, 2009, 2012, 2017, 2024, 2025	Runners-Up (2001)
Cornell	10	2010, 2011, 2012, 2013, 2014, 2017, 2019, ~~2020~~, 2024, 2025	Runners-Up (2010)
Dartmouth	8	2001, 2003, 2004, 2005, 2007, 2008, 2009, 2011	Frozen Four (2001, 2003, 2004, 2005)
Northeastern	8	2016, 2018, 2019, ~~2020~~, 2021, 2022, 2023, 2026	Runners-Up (2021)
Ohio State	8	2018, ~~2020~~, 2021, 2022, 2023, 2024, 2025, 2026	Champions (2022, 2024)
Boston University	7	2010, 2011, 2012, 2013, 2014, 2015, 2025	Runners-Up (2011, 2013)
Colgate	6	2018, 2021, 2022, 2023, 2024, 2025	Runners-Up (2018)
New Hampshire	5	2006, 2007, 2008, 2009, 2010	Frozen Four (2006, 2008)
Princeton	5	2006, 2016, 2019, ~~2020~~, 2026	National Quarterfinals (2006, 2016, 2019)
Quinnipiac	5	2015, 2016, 2022, 2023, 2026	National Quarterfinals (2015, 2016, 2022, 2023)
Penn State	4	2023, 2024, 2025, 2026	Frozen Four (2026)
Yale	3	2022, 2023, 2026	Frozen Four (2022)
Connecticut	2	2024, 2026	National Quarterfinals (2026)
North Dakota	2	2012, 2013	National Quarterfinals (2012, 2013)
Robert Morris	2	2017, 2021	National Quarterfinals (2017, 2021)
Providence	2	2005, 2021	National Quarterfinals (2005, 2021)
Syracuse	2	2019, 2022	National Quarterfinals (2019)
Niagara	1	2002	Frozen Four (2002)
RIT	1	2015	National Quarterfinals (2015)
Brown	1	2002	Runners-Up (2002)
Franklin Pierce	1	2026	First Round (2026)
Long Island	1	2023	First Round (2023)
Sacred Heart	1	2025	First Round (2025)
Stonehill	1	2024	First Round (2024)

== Tournament appearances by conference ==
=== AHA ===
School	# of Appearances	# of Frozen Fours	# of Championship Games	# of Championships
Mercyhurst	13 (2005, 2006, 2007, 2008, 2009, 2010, 2011, 2012, 2013, 2014, 2016, 2018, 2020)	4 (2009, 2010, 2013, 2014)	1 (2009)	0
Penn State	4 (2023, 2024, 2025, 2026)	1 (2026)	0	0
RIT	1 (2015)	0	0	0
Robert Morris	2 (2017, 2021)	0	0	0
Syracuse	2 (2019, 2022)	0	0	0

=== ECAC ===
School	# of Appearances	# of Frozen Fours	# of Championship Games	# of Championships
Brown	1 (2002)	1 (2002)	1 (2002)	0
Clarkson	13 (2010, 2013, 2014, 2015, 2016, 2017, 2018, 2019, 2020, 2022, 2023, 2024, 2025)	6 (2014, 2016, 2017, 2018, 2019, 2024)	3 (2014, 2017, 2018)	3 (2014, 2017, 2018)
Colgate	6 (2018, 2021, 2022, 2023, 2024, 2025)	2 (2018, 2024)	1 (2018)	0
Cornell	10 (2010, 2011, 2012, 2013, 2014, 2017, 2019, 2020, 2024, 2025)	5 (2010, 2011, 2012, 2019, 2025)	1 (2010)	0
Dartmouth	8 (2001, 2003, 2004, 2005, 2007, 2008, 2009, 2011)	4 (2001, 2003, 2004, 2005)	0	0
Harvard	12 (2001, 2003, 2004, 2005, 2006, 2007, 2008, 2010, 2013, 2014, 2015, 2022)	6 (2001, 2003, 2004, 2005, 2008, 2015)	4 (2003, 2004, 2005, 2015)	0
Princeton	5 (2006, 2016, 2019, 2020, 2026)	0	0	0
Quinnipiac	5 (2015, 2016, 2022, 2023, 2026)	0	0	0
St. Lawrence	11 (2001, 2004, 2005, 2006, 2007, 2008, 2009, 2012, 2017, 2024, 2025)	5 (2001, 2004, 2005, 2006, 2007)	1 (2001)	0
Yale	3 (2022, 2023, 2026)	1 (2022)	0	0

=== Hockey East ===
School	# of Appearances	# of Frozen Fours	# of Championship Games	# of Championships
Boston College	12 (2007, 2009, 2011, 2012, 2013, 2014, 2015, 2016, 2017, 2018, 2019, 2021)	7 (2007, 2011, 2012, 2013, 2015, 2016, 2017)	1 (2016)	0
Boston University	7 (2010, 2011, 2012, 2013, 2014, 2015, 2025)	2 (2011, 2013)	2 (2011, 2013)	0
Connecticut	2 (2024, 2026)	0	0	0
New Hampshire	5 (2006, 2007, 2008, 2009, 2010)	2 (2006, 2008)	0	0
Northeastern	8 (2016, 2018, 2019, 2020, 2021, 2022, 2023, 2026)	4 (2021, 2022, 2023, 2026)	1 (2021)	0
Providence	2 (2005, 2021)	0	0	0

=== NEWHA ===
School	# of Appearances	# of Frozen Fours	# of Championship Games	# of Championships
Franklin Pierce	1 (2026)	0	0	0
LIU	1 (2023)	0	0	0
Sacred Heart	1 (2025)	0	0	0
Stonehill	1 (2024)	0	0	0

=== WCHA ===
School	# of Appearances	# of Frozen Fours	# of Championship Games	# of Championships
Minnesota	23 (2002, 2003, 2004, 2005, 2006, 2008, 2009, 2010, 2011, 2012, 2013, 2014, 2015, 2016, 2017, 2018, 2019, 2020, 2022, 2023, 2024, 2025, 2026)	16 (2002, 2003, 2004, 2005, 2006, 2009, 2010, 2012, 2013, 2014, 2015, 2016, 2017, 2019, 2023, 2025)	9 (2004, 2005, 2006, 2012, 2013, 2014, 2015, 2016, 2019)	6 (2004, 2005, 2012, 2013, 2015, 2016)
Minnesota Duluth	17 (2001, 2002, 2003, 2005, 2006, 2007, 2008, 2009, 2010, 2011, 2017, 2021, 2022, 2023, 2024, 2025, 2026)	9 (2001, 2002, 2003, 2007, 2008, 2009, 2010, 2021, 2022)	7 (2001, 2002, 2003, 2007, 2008, 2010, 2022)	5 (2001, 2002, 2003, 2008, 2010)
Ohio State	8 (2018, 2020, 2021, 2022, 2023, 2024, 2025, 2026)	7 (2018, 2021, 2022, 2023, 2024, 2025, 2026)	5 (2022, 2023, 2024, 2025, 2026)	2 (2022, 2024)
Wisconsin	20 (2005, 2006, 2007, 2008, 2009, 2011, 2012, 2014, 2015, 2016, 2017, 2018, 2019, 2020, 2021, 2022, 2023, 2024, 2025, 2026)	18 (2006, 2007, 2008, 2009, 2011, 2012, 2014, 2015, 2016, 2017, 2018, 2019, 2021, 2023, 2024, 2025, 2026)	12 (2006, 2007, 2008, 2009, 2011, 2012, 2017, 2019, 2021, 2023, 2024, 2025, 2026)	9 (2006, 2007, 2009, 2011, 2019, 2021, 2023, 2025, 2026)

=== Defunct teams ===
School	# of Appearances	# of Frozen Fours	# of Championship Games	# of Championships
Niagara	1 (ECAC Eastern: 2002)	1 (ECAC Eastern: 2002)	0	0
North Dakota	2 (WCHA: 2012, 2013)	0	0	0

== Teams without a tournament appearance ==
Sixteen active Division I programs have never qualified for the NCAA tournament.

School	Conference	First NCAA Division I season
Delaware	AHA	2025
Lindenwood	AHA	2011
RPI	ECAC Hockey	2005
Union	ECAC Hockey	2003
Holy Cross	Hockey East	1999
Maine	Hockey East	1997
Merrimack	Hockey East	2015
Vermont	Hockey East	2001
Assumption	NEWHA	2023
Post	NEWHA	2019
Saint Anselm	NEWHA	2004
Saint Michael's	NEWHA	2001
Bemidji State	WCHA	1998
Minnesota State	WCHA	1998
St. Cloud State	WCHA	1998
St. Thomas	WCHA	2021
