= NCAA women's ice hockey tournament all-time team records =

The following is a list of team records and statistics from those that have made appearances in the NCAA women's ice hockey tournament. The championship has existed since the 2000–2001 season and groups include the university teams of Divisions I and II of the NCAA.

== Tournament format history ==
From the start of the NCAA National Collegiate women's ice hockey championship in 2001 through 2004, the tournament consisted of four teams. In 2005, the NCAA expanded the field to eight teams, with the champions from the ECAC, Hockey East, and WCHA conferences receiving automatic tournament bids. A decade later, the CHA conference (now AHA) champion also received an automatic bid to the tournament. Starting with the 2021–22 season, the field was expanded again to 11 teams, with the four aforementioned conference champions automatically in the tournament, and the rest of the field filled by at-large teams selected by a committee. In 2023, the NEWHA champion was also granted an automatic bid.

== Most championships won by team ==
The following list is of championships won ranked by team.

# of Titles	School	State
9	Wisconsin	Wisconsin
6	Minnesota	Minnesota
5	Minnesota Duluth	Minnesota
3	Clarkson	New York
2	Ohio State	Ohio

== Championships by conference ==
Number of championships won by each conference
Conference	# of Titles	Titles Won
CHA	0	—N/a
ECAC	3	2014, 2017, 2018
Hockey East	0	—N/a
NEWHA	0	—N/a
WCHA	22	2001, 2002, 2003, 2004, 2005, 2006, 2007, 2008, 2009, 2010, 2011, 2012, 2013, 2015, 2016, 2019, 2021, 2022, 2023, 2024, 2025, 2026
