= Michael Sisti =

Current position
- Title: Head Coach
- Team: Mercyhurst
- Conference: Atlantic Hockey

Biographical details
- Born: Buffalo, New York, U.S.
- Education: Canisius College

Coaching career (HC unless noted)
- 1992: Canisius (asst.)
- 1993–1998: Mercyhurst (asst.)
- 1999–Present: Mercyhurst

Head coaching record
- Overall: 611–261–72

Accomplishments and honors

Championships
- GLWHA Champion (2002); 13× CHA Champion (2003–2013, 2016, 2018, 2020)

Awards
- Canisius Hall of Fame (2002); AHCA Coach of the Year (2005); USCHO Coach of the Year (2007); Erie Sports Hall of Fame (2018)

Michael Sisti is the women's ice hockey current head coach at Mercyhurst University. Since 1999, he has coached Mercyhurst to 4 Frozen Four appearances, 15 College Hockey America (CHA) post-season titles, and one Great Lakes Women's Hockey Association (GLWHA) post-season title. He reached 500 wins in 2020, becoming only the second coach in Division I women's college hockey to achieve that milestone. In 2018, he was inducted into the Erie Hall of Fame.

== Personal life ==
Sisti is a native of Buffalo, New York. He graduated from Canisius College in 1991. He holds numerous scoring records at Canisius and is a 2002 inductee in the Canisius Athletic Hall of Fame.

== Coaching ==
After graduation, he was an assistant coach for the Canisius men's program and came to Mercyhurst in 1993 as an assistant coach on the men's team. In 1999, Sisti became the head coach of the newly formed women's varsity team. To date, he has been the only head coach of the program.

Sisti's team reached the NCAA Tournament each year from 2005 through 2014. The 10 consecutive appearances are an NCAA Division I record. In 2009, Mercyhurst reached the NCAA Championship game, losing to Wisconsin 5–0, in their first of four Frozen Four seasons.

Mercyhurst teams have won fifteen conference championships, with Sisti as head coach.

On December 11, 2020, Sisti reached the 500-win milestone as head coach, when Mercyhurst defeated RIT by a score of 5–1. Only one other head coach, Wisconsin's Mark Johnson, has achieved this milestone in Division I women's college ice hockey. Sisti is the 30th coach in the history of college hockey to earn 500 wins.

On November 28, 2025, Sisti won his 600th game. Defeating the Stonehill Skyhawks in a 6–1 final, it also marked the first meeting between the two teams. Similar to the milestone of his 500th win, Mark Johnson of Wisconsin is the only other coach with 600 wins in NCAA women's ice hockey.

== Head coaching record ==
Record table
| Season | Team | Overall | Conference | Standing | Postseason |
|---|---|---|---|---|---|
Mercyhurst (Independent) (1999–2000)
| 1999–2000 | Mercyhurst | 23–6–0 | | | |
Mercyhurst (Great Lakes Women's Hockey Association) (2000–2002)
| 2000–2001 | Mercyhurst | 14–16–3 | 5–1–2 | 2nd | |
| 2001–2002 | Mercyhurst | 24–8–1 | 8–0–0 | 1st | |
Mercyhurst (College Hockey America) (2002–2024)
| 2002–2003 | Mercyhurst | 25–8–1 | 6–0–0 | 1st | |
| 2003–2004 | Mercyhurst | 26–6–4 | 11–1–0 | 1st | |
| 2004–2005 | Mercyhurst | 28–7–2 | 11–0–1 | 1st | NCAA Tournament Quarterfinals |
| 2005–2006 | Mercyhurst | 23–8–6 | 10–0–2 | 1st | NCAA Tournament Quarterfinals |
| 2006–2007 | Mercyhurst | 32–2–3 | 11–0–1 | 1st | NCAA Tournament Quarterfinals |
| 2007–2008 | Mercyhurst | 26–8–3 | 11–2–1 | 1st | NCAA Tournament Quarterfinals |
| 2008–2009 | Mercyhurst | 31–6–0 | 16–0–0 | 1st | NCAA Championship Game |
| 2009–2010 | Mercyhurst | 30–3–3 | 14–1–1 | 1st | NCAA Frozen Four |
| 2010–2011 | Mercyhurst | 29–6–0 | 16–0–0 | 1st | NCAA Tournament Quarterfinals |
| 2011–2012 | Mercyhurst | 23–8–3 | 8–1–3 | 1st | NCAA Tournament Quarterfinals |
| 2012–2013 | Mercyhurst | 29–7–1 | 17–3–0 | 1st | NCAA Frozen Four |
| 2013–2014 | Mercyhurst | 24–9–4 | 15–3–2 | 1st | NCAA Frozen Four |
| 2014–2015 | Mercyhurst | 23–9–3 | 14–5–1 | 1st | |
| 2015–2016 | Mercyhurst | 19–11–5 | 14–3–3 | 1st | NCAA Tournament Quarterfinals |
| 2016–2017 | Mercyhurst | 15–18–2 | 11–8–1 | 3rd | |
| 2017–2018 | Mercyhurst | 18–15–4 | 13–4–3 | 2nd | NCAA Tournament Quarterfinals |
| 2018–2019 | Mercyhurst | 15–14–5 | 12–6–2 | 2nd | |
| 2019–2020 | Mercyhurst | 21–10–5 | 13–4–3 | 1st | NCAA Tournament cancelled |
| 2020–2021 | Mercyhurst | 10–7–1 | 10–6–1 | 3rd | |
| 2021–2022 | Mercyhurst | 21–12–2 | 10–6–0 | 3rd | |
| 2022–2023 | Mercyhurst | 21–14–2 | 12–3–2 | 2nd | |
| 2023–2024 | Mercyhurst | 20–17–1 | 14–6–0 | 2nd | |
Mercyhurst (Atlantic Hockey) (2024–present)
| 2024–2025 | Mercyhurst | 20–17–2 | 13–6–1 | 2nd | |
| 2025–2026 | Mercyhurst | 21–10–3 | 17–5–2 | 2nd | |
| Mercyhurst: | | 611–261–72 | 313–80–31 | | |
| Total: | | 611–261–72 | | | |
National champion Postseason invitational champion Conference regular season champion Conference regular season and conference tournament champion Division regular season champion Division regular season and conference tournament champion Conference tournament champion

== See also ==
List of college women's ice hockey career coaching wins leaders
