= Katie King-Crowley =

American ice hockey player (born 1975)

Katie King Crowley
Personal information
- Full name: Kathryn King
- Born: May 24, 1975 (age 51) Salem, New Hampshire, U.S.
- Education: Brown University
Medal record
Women's ice hockey
Representing the United States
Olympic Games
Gold medal – first place	1998 Nagano	Tournament
Silver medal – second place	2002 Salt Lake City	Tournament
Bronze medal – third place	2006 Turin	Tournament
IIHF World Women's Championships
Gold medal – first place	2005 Sweden	Tournament
Silver medal – second place	1997 Canada	Tournament
Silver medal – second place	1999 Finland	Tournament
Silver medal – second place	2000 Canada	Tournament
Silver medal – second place	2001 United States	Tournament
Silver medal – second place	2004 Canada	Tournament

Kathryn Karen King (born May 24, 1975) is an American ice hockey player. Raised in Salem, New Hampshire, she won a gold medal at the 1998 Winter Olympics, silver medal at the 2002 Winter Olympics and a bronze medal at the 2006 Winter Olympics. She graduated from Brown University in 1997. While at Brown, she also played softball, and was selected as the Ivy League Softball Player of the Year in 1996.

King graduated from Brown University in 1997 with 123 goals and 83 assists in 100 games. King also played for the US National Women's Team. At six World Championships, King registered 36 points in 30 games. At the 2001 tournament, she had a tournament-high seven goals. She also played for the 2005 gold medal winning team. At the end of her Olympic career, she ranked first all time amongst Americans in Olympic scoring with 23 points. She has won gold (Nagano), silver (Salt Lake City) and bronze (Torino) during her Olympic career.

In 2003, King became an assistant women's ice hockey coach for the Boston College Eagles women's ice hockey program and was named the head coach in 2007 following the resignation of former head coach Tom Mutch.

== Head coaching record ==
Record table
Season	Team	Overall	Conference	Standing	Postseason
Boston College Eagles (Hockey East) (2007–present)
2007–08	Boston College	14-13-7	9-9-3	5th	
2008–09	Boston College	22-9-5	14-6-3	2nd	NCAA First Round
2009–10	Boston College	8-17-10	7-10-4	6th	
2010–11	Boston College	24-7-6	13-4-4	2nd	NCAA Frozen Four
2011–12	Boston College	24-10-3	15-4-2	2nd	NCAA Frozen Four
2012–13	Boston College	27-7-3	17-2-2	2nd	NCAA Frozen Four
2013–14	Boston College	27-7-3	18-2-1	1st	NCAA First Round
2014–15	Boston College	34-3-2	20-0-1	1st	NCAA Frozen Four
2015–16	Boston College	40-1-0	24-0-0	1st	NCAA Runner-Up
2016-17	Boston College	28-6-5	17-4-3	1st	NCAA Frozen Four
2017-18	Boston College	30-5-3	19-2-3	1st	NCAA First Round
2018-19	Boston College	26-12-1	19-7-1	2nd	NCAA First Round
2019-20	Boston College	17-16-3	14-11-2	4th	
2020-21	Boston College	14-6-0	14-4-0	2nd	NCAA First Round
2021-22	Boston College	19-14-1	16-9-1	4th	
2022-23	Boston College	20-15-1	16-11-0	4th	
2023-24	Boston College	15-14-7	13-9-5	4th	
2024-25	Boston College	21-13-2	16-9-2	3rd	
Boston College:		400-175-62	281-104-37		
Total:		400-175-62			
National champion Postseason invitational champion Conference regular season champion Conference regular season and conference tournament champion Division regular season champion Division regular season and conference tournament champion Conference tournament champion

== Awards and honors ==
- 2006 Bob Allen Women's Player of the Year Award
- 2× AHCA Coach of the Year (2015, 2016)

=== NCAA ===
- 1994 Kate Silver '86 Award (awarded by Brown University)
- 1996 All-ECAC Team
- 1997 Marjorie Brown Smith Award
- 1997 ECAC Player of the Year Award

== See also ==
- List of college women's ice hockey career coaching wins leaders
