= Brad Frost =

Canadian ice hockey coach

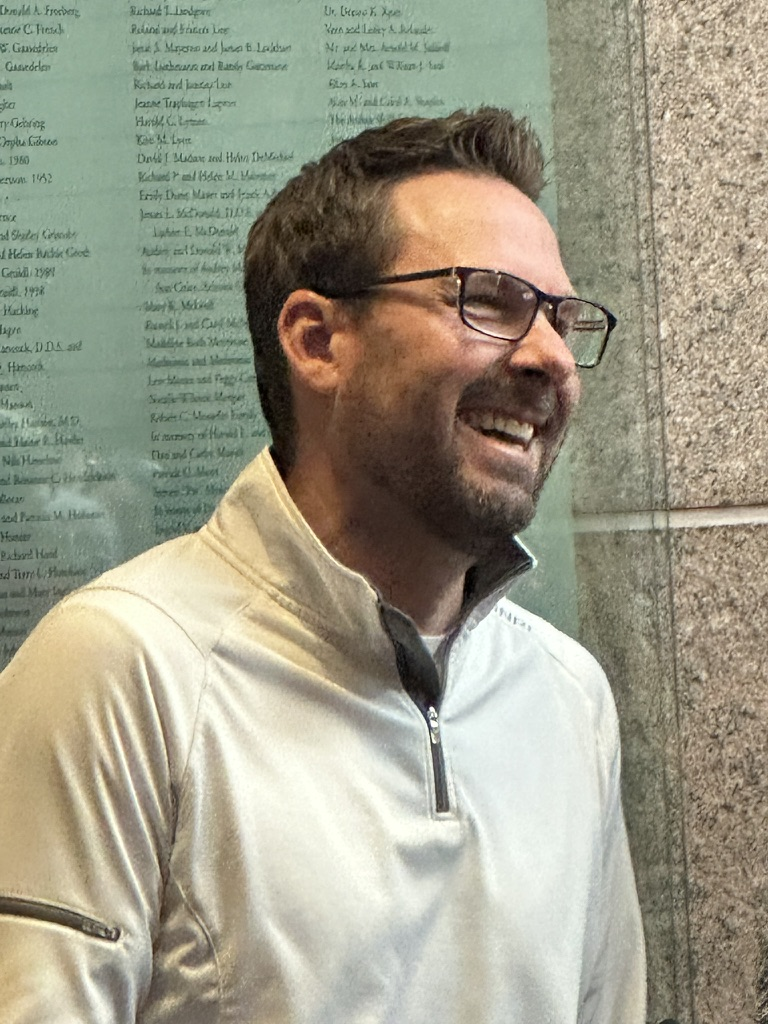
- Frost in 2025

Biographical details
- Born: May 11, 1973 (age 53); Burlington, Ontario
- Education: Bethel University

Coaching career (HC unless noted)
- 2007–2026: Minnesota

Head coaching record
- Overall: 556–131–43

Accomplishments and honors

Championships
- 4× NCAA (2012, 2013, 2015, 2016); 6× WCHA Regular Season (2009, 2010, 2015, 2015, 2019, 2022); 5× WCHA Tournament (2012, 2013, 2014, 2018, 2023)

Awards
- 2× AHCA Coach of the Year (2013, 2014)

Brad Frost (born May 11, 1973) is a former women's ice hockey head coach, most recently for the University of Minnesota. During his tenure as head coach he led the Gophers to four NCAA Championships, 10 Frozen Four appearances, and five WCHA tournament championships.

== Early life ==
Frost was raised in Burlington, Ontario. He graduated from Bethel University in 1996 with a bachelor's degree in Physical and Health Education. He played as a forward on the hockey team and served as team captain for two years. After graduation, he was an assistant coach for the Eagan (Minnesota) High School girls' team and then for the Bethel University men's team. In June 2001, Frost joined the coaching staff at the University of Minnesota as an assistant to Laura Halldorson. While working as an assistant coach, Minnesota won the NCAA Championships in 2004 and 2005.

== Coaching career ==
Frost was appointed interim head coach upon Halldorson's retirement in August 2007. He coached the team to a 27–7–4 record in the 2007–08 season and was voted WCHA Coach of the Year. His place as head coach was made permanent on April 16, 2008. He coached Minnesota to 62 consecutive wins between February 18, 2012, and November 16, 2013. During that streak, Minnesota earned the 2012 NCAA title and had an undefeated season culminating in the 2013 NCAA title. Minnesota lost in the 2014 NCAA Championship match, but won the 2015 and 2016 titles. On March 17, 2026, Frost was fired after 19 seasons as head coach at Minnesota. During his tenure as head coach he led the Gophers to a 556–131–43 record, and four NCAA championships in five years.

== Head coaching record ==
Record table
Season	Team	Overall	Conference	Standing	Postseason
Minnesota Golden Gophers (Western Collegiate Hockey Association) (2007–present)
2007–08	Minnesota	27–7–4	21–5–2	2nd	NCAA Quarterfinals
2008–09	Minnesota	32–5–3	23–2–3	1st	NCAA Frozen Four
2009–10	Minnesota	26–9–5	18–6–4	1st	NCAA Frozen Four
2010–11	Minnesota	26–10–2	18–8–2	2nd	NCAA Quarterfinals
2011–12	Minnesota	34–5–2	21–5–2	2nd	NCAA Champions
2012–13	Minnesota	41–0–0	28–0–0	1st	NCAA Champions
2013–14	Minnesota	38–2–1	26–1–1	1st	NCAA Runner-Up
2014–15	Minnesota	34–3–4	22–2–4	1st	NCAA Champions
2015–16	Minnesota	35–4–1	24–3–1	2nd	NCAA Champions
2016–17	Minnesota	26–8–5	19–4–5	2nd	NCAA Frozen Four
2017–18	Minnesota	24–11–3	13–8–3	3rd	NCAA Quarterfinals
2018–19	Minnesota	32–6–1	19–4–1	1st	NCAA Runner-Up
2019–20	Minnesota	27–6–3	17–5–2	2nd	Qualified
2020–21	Minnesota	11–8–1	11–7–1	4th	
2021–22	Minnesota	29–9–1	21–6–1	1st	NCAA Quarterfinals
2022–23	Minnesota	30–6–3	22–3–3	2nd	NCAA Frozen Four
2023–24	Minnesota	27–10–2	19–7–2	3rd	NCAA Quarterfinals
2024–25	Minnesota	29–12–1	18–9–1	3rd	NCAA Frozen Four
2025–26	Minnesota	26–12–1	19–8–1	3rd	NCAA Quarterfinals
Minnesota:		556–131–43	380–92–39		
Total:		556–131–43			
National champion Postseason invitational champion Conference regular season champion Conference regular season and conference tournament champion Division regular season champion Division regular season and conference tournament champion Conference tournament champion

== Personal life ==
Frost is a Christian. Frost is married to Dayna Frost. They have three children.

== See also ==
- List of college women's ice hockey career coaching wins leaders
