= Satu Kiipeli =

Finnish ice hockey player and coach

- Born: 24 December 1980 (age 45) Raahe, Finland
- Height: 174 cm (5 ft 9 in)
- Weight: 70 kg (154 lb; 11 st 0 lb)
- Position: Defense
- Shot: Left
- Played for: Oulun Kärpät; Minnesota Duluth Bulldogs; Minnesota Whitecaps; IHK Helsinki
- Current NSML coach: Oulun Kärpät
- Coached for: IHK Helsinki
- National team: Finland
- Playing career: 1994–2015
- Coaching career: 2016–present

Satu Kiipeli (born 24 December 1980) is a Finnish retired ice hockey defenseman and assistant coach of Oulun Kärpät in the Naisten Liiga (NSML). During her career with the Finnish national team, she represented Finland in the women's ice hockey tournament at the 2006 Winter Olympics in Turin and at the IIHF Women's World Championships in 2001 and 2005.

== Playing career ==
Kiipeli's senior career began in the 1994–95 season of the Naisten SM-sarja with Oulun Kärpät Naiset. She played six seasons in Finland with Kärpät before relocating to the United States in 2000 to play with the Minnesota Duluth Bulldogs women's ice hockey program in the Western Collegiate Hockey Association (WCHA) conference of the NCAA Division I. With the Bulldogs, she won the NCAA Women's Ice Hockey Championship in 2001, 2002, and 2003.

Following graduation from the University of Minnesota Duluth in 2004, Kiipeli played the 2004–05 season with the Minnesota Whitecaps in the Western Women's Hockey League (WWHL). In 2005, she moved back to Finland to begin her master's studies at the University of Jyväskylä and returned to playing in the Naisten SM-sarja, this time as captain of the women's team of Itä-Helsingin Kiekko (IHK). During the 2006–07 season, she served as player-coach for IHK, capping the season with a Finnish Championship bronze medal win.

In 2007, she left IHK to rejoin Oulun Kärpät and stayed with the team until her retirement from playing in 2015. With Kärpät she won the Aurora Borealis Cup in 2012 and a bronze medal in the 2013 IIHF European Women's Champions Cup.

== Personal life ==
As of 2021, Kiipeli is a member of the board of the Naisjääkiekkoilijoiden Alumni ('Women's Ice Hockey Alumni [Association]'), a subsidiary of the Alumni Association of the Liiga (Liiga Alumni ry).

== See also ==
- List of Olympic women's ice hockey players for Finland
- List of Finnish women in North American collegiate ice hockey
