= Nora Tallus =

Finnish ice hockey player

- Born: 9 February 1981 (age 45) Kerava, Finland
- Height: 1.63 m (5 ft 4 in)
- Weight: 65 kg (143 lb; 10 st 3 lb)
- Position: Forward
- Shot: Right
- Played for: Keravan Shakers; IHK Helsinki; Minnesota Duluth Bulldogs; SKIF Nizhny Novgorod; HPK Hämeenlinna
- National team: Finland
- Playing career: 1996–2011
Medal record
Women's ice hockey
Representing Finland
World Championships
Bronze medal – third place	2004 Canada
Bronze medal – third place	2008 China

Nora Tallus, previously Liikanen, (born 9 February 1981) is a Finnish retired ice hockey forward, currently serving as assistant coach to KJT Haukat of the Naisten Mestis. She represented Finland in the women's ice hockey tournament at the 2006 Winter Olympics and in four IIHF World Women's Championships, with bronze medals won in the 2004 and 2008 tournaments.

Tallus attended University of Minnesota Duluth (UMD) from 2001 to 2005 where she played with the Bulldogs ice hockey team. With the Bulldogs, she was an NCAA Division I National Champion in 2002 and 2003. In the 2003 tournament, Tallus scored the championship winning goal 4:16 into second overtime against Harvard.
