= Niagara Purple Eagles ice hockey =

Niagara Purple Eagles ice hockey may refer to either of the ice hockey teams that represent Niagara University:

- Niagara Purple Eagles men's ice hockey
- Niagara Purple Eagles women's ice hockey
