= NCAA Division I women's ice hockey tournament Most Outstanding Player =

Tournament Most Outstanding Player
- Sport: Ice hockey
- Awarded for: To the player who is judged to be the most outstanding player over the course of the NCAA women's ice hockey tournament

History
- First award: 2001
- Most recent: Ava McNaughton, Wisconsin

The tournament Most Outstanding Player is an annual award given out at the conclusion of the NCAA women's ice hockey tournament to the player to be judged the most outstanding. The award has been in effect since the adoption of a national championship tournament for the 2000–01 season.

== History ==
Only one winner did not play for the National Champion, Kristy Zamora in 2002. Only two players have been named MOP more than once, Jessie Vetter in 2006 and 2009, and Noora Räty in 2012 and 2013. In 2011 the MOP was awarded to multiple players for the first time when it was awarded to Meghan Duggan and Hilary Knight.

The 2020 tournament was cancelled due to the COVID-19 pandemic, as a result no tournament Most Outstanding Player was awarded.

== Most Outstanding Player ==
Year	Winner	Position	School
2001	Maria Rooth	Forward	Minnesota Duluth
2002	Kristy Zamora*	Forward	Brown
2003	Caroline Ouellette	Forward	Minnesota Duluth
2004	Krissy Wendell	Forward	Minnesota
2005	Natalie Darwitz	Forward	Minnesota
2006	Jessie Vetter	Goaltender	Wisconsin
2007	Sara Bauer	Forward	Wisconsin
2008	Kim Martin	Goaltender	Minnesota Duluth
2009	Jessie Vetter	Goaltender	Wisconsin
2010	Emmanuelle Blais	Forward	Minnesota Duluth
2011	Meghan Duggan	Forward	Wisconsin
2011	Hilary Knight	Forward	Wisconsin
2012	Noora Räty	Goaltender	Minnesota

Note: * Recipient did not play for the National Champion

Year	Winner	Position	School
2013	Noora Räty	Goaltender	Minnesota
2014	Jamie Lee Rattray	Forward	Clarkson
2015	Hannah Brandt	Forward	Minnesota
2016	Sarah Potomak	Forward	Minnesota
2017	Cayley Mercer	Forward	Clarkson
2018	Shea Tiley	Goaltender	Clarkson
2019	Kristen Campbell	Goaltender	Wisconsin
2021	Makenna Webster	Forward	Wisconsin
2022	Paetyn Levis	Forward	Ohio State
2023	Cami Kronish	Goaltender	Wisconsin
2024	Raygan Kirk	Goaltender	Ohio State
2025	Kirsten Simms	Forward	Wisconsin
2026	Ava McNaughton	Goaltender	Wisconsin

== Award breakdown ==
Winners by school
School	Winners
Wisconsin	10
Minnesota	6
Minnesota Duluth	4
Clarkson	3
Ohio State	2
Brown	1

Winners by position
Position	Winners
Forward	16
Goaltender	10
