= Shannon Miller (ice hockey) =

Canadian ice hockey player and coach

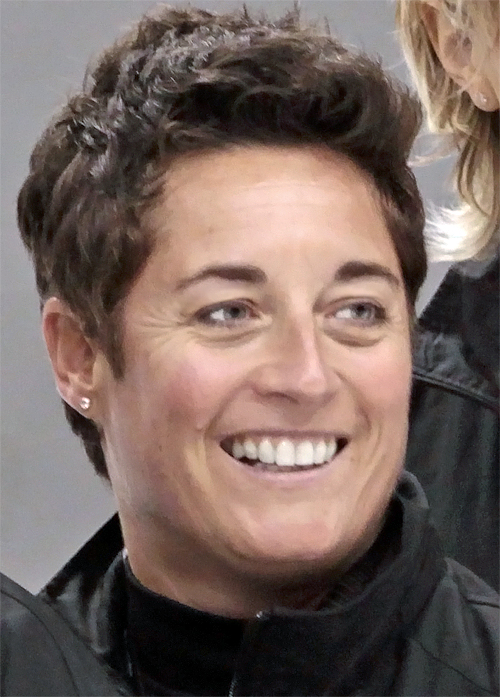
- Miller in 2010

Biographical details
- Born: November 17, 1963 (age 62); Melfort, Saskatchewan, Canada
- Education: University of Saskatchewan

Coaching career (HC unless noted)
- 1999–2015: Minnesota Duluth
- 2018: Calgary Inferno

Head coaching record
- Overall: 383–144–50 (.707)

Accomplishments and honors

Championships
- 5× NCAA Women's Ice Hockey Tournament champion (2001, 2002, 2003, 2008, 2010)

Awards
- WCHA Coach of the Year (2000); AHCA Coach of the Year (2003); 2010 YWCA Woman of Distinction Award

Shannon Miller
Medal record

Representing Canada

Women's Ice hockey at the Winter Olympics
Silver medal – second place	1998 Nagano	Ice hockey

IIHF World Women's Championships
Gold medal – first place	1997	Tournament

Shannon Miller (born November 17, 1963) is a Canadian ice hockey coach. She is currently the head coach of the Switzerland women's national ice hockey team. She previously served as the head coach of the Minnesota Duluth Bulldogs women's ice hockey team from 1999 to 2015. In addition, she was the head coach of the Canadian national women's hockey team which claimed gold at the 1997 IIHF World Women's Championships, along with the silver medal in ice hockey at the 1998 Winter Olympics.

== Playing career ==
Miller played in the first Canadian national championships in 1982. Miller also refereed Canadian university hockey from 1982 to 1985. In 1985, she was a member of the Canadian Hockey Feminine Council and was president of the Southern Alberta Women’s Hockey League. She helped to form the first ever girls minor hockey association in Calgary in 1989.

== Coaching career ==
=== Hockey Canada ===
She was an assistant coach for Team Alberta at the 1991 Canada Winter Games. In addition, she was an assistant coach for Team Canada at the 1992 and 1994 Women’s World Ice Hockey championships.

=== Minnesota Duluth ===
On April 20, 1998, Miller was hired as the first head coach for the Minnesota Duluth Bulldogs women's ice hockey team. On March 22, 2010, Duluth mayor Don Ness declared Friday, March 26, 2010 as "Shannon Miller Day'" in Duluth. She is the most successful NCAA women's hockey coach in Frozen Four tournament wins (11) and NCAA Division I national championships (five). She reached her 250th and 300th career wins faster than any other head coach in NCAA Division I history. She is the third best Division I coach in wins and just one of two Division I coaches to reach the 200-win mark in eight seasons.

In June 2011, Miller was named the coaching mentor for the Russian senior national team in preparation for the 2014 Winter Olympics in Sochi, Russia.

Heading into the 2011–12 Minnesota Duluth Bulldogs women's ice hockey season, Miller was chair of the Ethics Committee for US women's college hockey. In addition, she was a member of the NCAA Division 1 Championships Committee, one of only two coaches in the entire country to serve on both committees.

On October 5, 2013, Miller became the 3rd coach in NCAA history to reach 350 career wins after a 6–1 win over the University of Connecticut at Amsoil Arena. Miller's contract was not renewed beyond the 2014–15 season as part of an effort by the school to close a $4.5 million budget deficit.

==== Discrimination lawsuit against UMD ====
In September 2015, Miller and two other former UMD coaches, softball coach Jen Banford (whose contract also had not been renewed) and basketball coach Annette Wiles (who had resigned in June 2015 due to an alleged hostile work environment), filed suit against the University of Minnesota Board of Regents, alleging discrimination based on gender, sexual orientation, age and national origin, and that UMD created a hostile work environment, violated equal pay laws and violated Title IX of the United States Education Amendments of 1972, which prohibits sexual discrimination in education programs receiving federal financial assistance.

The trial began March 6, 2018 at the federal courthouse in Duluth, MN. On March 15, the jury found the university guilty of sex discrimination and retaliation and awarded Miller $3.74 million ($744,832 in past lost wages and $3 million in past emotional distress.) No award was made for future emotional distress and the judge was to determine any award for future lost wages.

In December 2019 University of Minnesota Duluth officials finalized a settlement with Miller totalling $4,530,157, with a payment of $2,102,939 to Miller, and $2,427,218 to her attorneys.

=== CWHL ===
On June 23, 2018, Miller signed a contract to become the head coach for the Calgary Inferno of the CWHL. She left after only 12 games and a 10–1–1 record while in first place in the league claiming a difference of opinion with the general manager.

== Coaching record ==
=== Minnesota Duluth ===
Record table
Season	Team	Overall	Conference	Standing	Postseason
University of Minnesota Duluth (Western Collegiate Hockey Association) (1999–present)
1999-00	Minnesota Duluth	25–5–3	21–1–2	1st	NCAA Quarterfinals
2000–01	Minnesota Duluth	28–5–4	15–5–4	2nd	NCAA Champions
2001–02	Minnesota Duluth	24–6–4	16–5–3	3rd	NCAA Champions
2002–03	Minnesota Duluth	31–3–2	21–2–1	1st	NCAA Champions
2003–04	Minnesota Duluth	20–12–2	15–8–1	3rd	
2004–05	Minnesota Duluth	26–6–2	22–4–2	2nd	NCAA Quarterfinals
2005–06	Minnesota Duluth	22–9–3	18–7–3	3rd	NCAA Quarterfinals
2006–07	Minnesota Duluth	24–11–4	19–6–3	2nd	NCAA Frozen Four
2007–08	Minnesota Duluth	34–4–1	24–4–0	1st	NCAA Champions
2008–09	Minnesota Duluth	26–9–4	18–6–4	3rd	NCAA Frozen Four
2009–10	Minnesota Duluth	31–8–2	20–6–2	1st	NCAA Champions
2010–11	Minnesota Duluth	22–9–3	18–7–3	3rd	NCAA Quarterfinals
2011–12	Minnesota Duluth	21–14–1	15–12–1	4th	
2012–13	Minnesota Duluth	14–16–4	13–13–2	4th	
2013–14	Minnesota Duluth	15–15–6	11–11–6	4th	
2014–15	Minnesota Duluth	20–12–5	14–10–4	4th	
Minnesota Duluth:		383–144–50			
Total:		383–144–50			
National champion Postseason invitational champion Conference regular season champion Conference regular season and conference tournament champion Division regular season champion Division regular season and conference tournament champion Conference tournament champion

== Awards and honors ==
- Petro Canada Coaching Excellence Award
- 2000 WCHA Coach of the Year
- In 2003, Miller was part of the Bulldogs coaching staff that was named American Association of College Coaches' women's hockey coaching staff of the year.
- 2003 AHCA Coach of the Year
- YWCA's Woman of Distinction 2010 Award (celebrates women's leadership)

== Personal ==
Miller hails from Melfort, Saskatchewan. On May 2, 2012 at the federal courthouse in St. Paul, Minnesota, Miller became a United States citizen and now holds dual Canadian/American citizenship.

== See also ==
- List of college women's ice hockey career coaching wins leaders
