= AHCA Coach of the Year =

Women's college ice hockey coaching award

- Sport: Ice hockey
- Awarded for: The most outstanding coach in NCAA Division I women's ice hockey
- Presented by: American Hockey Coaches Association

History
- First award: 1998
- Most recent: Jeff Kampersal

The AHCA Coach of the Year is awarded yearly to the top coach in NCAA Division I women's college ice hockey by the American Hockey Coaches Association.

== Award winners ==
Season	Player	School	Reference
1998	Laura Halldorson	Minnesota	
1999	Katey Stone	Harvard	
2000	Judy Parish Oberting	Dartmouth	
2001	Paul Flanagan	St. Lawrence	
2002	Laura Halldorson	Minnesota	
2003	Shannon Miller	Minnesota Duluth	
2004	Laura Halldorson	Minnesota	
2005	Michael Sisti	Mercyhurst	
2006	Mark Johnson	Wisconsin	
2007	Mark Johnson	Wisconsin	
2008	Jim Fetter	Wayne State	
2009	Mark Johnson	Wisconsin	
2010	Doug Derraugh	Cornell	
2011	Mark Johnson	Wisconsin	
2012	Chris Wells	St. Lawrence	
2013	Brad Frost	Minnesota	
2014	Brad Frost	Minnesota	
2015	Katie King-Crowley	Boston College	
2016	Katie King-Crowley	Boston College	
2017	Maura Crowell	Minnesota Duluth	
2018	Greg Fargo	Colgate	
2019	Doug Derraugh	Cornell	
2020	Doug Derraugh	Cornell	
2021	Dave Flint	Northeastern	
2022	Mark Bolding	Yale	
2023	Dave Flint	Northeastern	
2024	Chris MacKenzie	UConn	
2025	Mark Johnson	Wisconsin	
2026	Jeff Kampersal	Penn State	

=== Winners by school ===
School	Winners
Minnesota	5
Wisconsin	5
Cornell	3
Boston College	2
Minnesota Duluth	2
Northeastern	2
St. Lawrence	2
Colgate	1
Dartmouth	1
Harvard	1
Mercyhurst	1
Penn State	1
UConn	1
Wayne State	1
Yale	1

=== Multiple Wins ===
School	Winners
Mark Johnson	5
Doug Derraugh	3
Laura Halldorson	3
Dave Flint	2
Brad Frost	2
Katie King-Crowley	2
