= Angie Keseley =

American ice hockey player (born 1987)

- Born: June 9, 1987 (age 38) St. Louis Park, Minnesota, U.S.
- Height: 5 ft 7 in (170 cm)
- Weight: 148 lb (67 kg; 10 st 8 lb)
- Position: Forward
- Shot: Left
- Played for: Wisconsin Badgers
- National team: United States
- Playing career: 2005–2010

Angie Keseley (born June 9, 1987) was a member of the Wisconsin Badgers women's ice hockey program. She was part of the 2009–10 United States women's national ice hockey team that participated in the Qwest Tour.

== Playing career ==
As a child, Keseley would play pond hockey with her brother Jon. She played boys' hockey until eighth grade. At St. Louis Park High School in Minnesota, Keseley accumulated 289 points in 101 games for the varsity team from 2001 to 2005. As a junior and senior in high school, she figured in on more than 70 percent of her team's goals.

=== Wisconsin ===
At Wisconsin, Keseley helped the Badgers win national championships in 2006, 2007 and 2009. She was Wisconsin's third-leading scorer in 2008–09, setting personal bests with 18 goals, 41 assists for a total of 59 points. On the Qwest Tour, she picked up a pair of assists in an 11–1 win over the University of North Dakota.

=== Team USA ===
Keseley joined Team USA in the 2009–10 Qwest Tour, to determine the final roster for the US team at the 2010 Winter Games. It was her first experience with Team USA.
