= 2004 NCAA National Collegiate women's ice hockey tournament =

NCAA women's ice hockey postseason tournament

- Teams: 4
- Finals site: Dunkin' Donuts Center, Providence, Rhode Island
- Champions: Minnesota Golden Gophers (1st title)
- Runner-up: Harvard Crimson (2nd title game)
- Semifinalists: Dartmouth Big Green (3rd Frozen Four); St. Lawrence Saints (2nd Frozen Four)
- Winning coach: Laura Halldorson (1st title)
- MOP: Krissy Wendell (Minnesota)
- Attendance: 3,522

The 2004 NCAA National Collegiate Women's Ice Hockey Tournament involved four schools playing in single-elimination play to determine the national champion of women's NCAA Division I college ice hockey. It began on March 26, 2004, and ended with the championship game on March 28. A total of four games were played.

== Qualifying teams ==
2004 Qualifying Teams
WCHA, ECAC

Seed	School	Conference	Record	Berth Type	Appearance	Last bid
1	Minnesota	WCHA	28–4–2	Tournament champion	3rd	2003
2	Harvard	ECAC	29–3–1	Tournament champion	3rd	2003
3	St. Lawrence	ECAC	27–9–1	At-large bid	2nd	2001
4	Dartmouth	ECAC	24–6–2	At-large bid	3rd	2003

== NCAA Frozen Four ==
National Semifinals; March 26
1	Minnesota	5
4	Dartmouth	1
2	Harvard	2
3	St. Lawrence	1

National Championship; March 28
1	Minnesota	6
2	Harvard	2
Consolation Game
4	Dartmouth	1
3	St. Lawrence	2

== Tournament awards ==
=== All-Tournament Team ===
- G, Jody Horak, Minnesota
- D, Angela Ruggiero, Harvard
- D, Allie Sanchez, Minnesota
- F, Krissy Wendell*, Minnesota
- F, Natalie Darwitz, Minnesota
- F, Kelly Stephens, Minnesota

* Most Outstanding Player
