= Niagara Purple Eagles women's ice hockey =

- University: Niagara University
- Conference: CHA
- Arena: Dwyer Arena; Lewiston, New York
- Colors: Purple and white

NCAA tournament Frozen Four
- 2002

NCAA tournament appearances
- 2002

The Niagara Purple Eagles women's ice hockey team was a National Collegiate Athletic Association (NCAA) Division I college ice hockey program that represented Niagara University. The Purple Eagles were a member of College Hockey America. They played at the Dwyer Arena in Niagara University's campus (Lewiston, New York).

== History ==
In 2002, Niagara appeared in the Frozen Four but lost in the semi-finals to Minnesota Duluth by a score of 3–2. Niagara tied Minnesota 2–2 in the Consolation Game.
Tania Pinelli was included in the all-tournament team.

In the 2002–03 season, the team changed athletic conference from ECAC to College Hockey America.

On May 20, 2009, Chris MacKenzie was named the second head coach at Niagara in program history. He served as head coach for two years and compiled a 23–31–10 record. He resigned as head coach on August 23, 2011.

On March 19, 2012, the school announced that it was cancelling its women's ice hockey program.

=== Year by year ===
Year	Wins	Losses	Ties	Coach	Postseason
2010–11	11	17	5	Chris MacKenzie	
2009–10	12	14	5	Chris MacKenzie	
2008–09	6	25	5	Margot Page	
2007–08	9	22	4	Margot Page	
2006–07	10	19	6	Margot Page, Heather Reinke	
2005–06	11	21	4	Heather Reinke	
2004–05	16	15	3	Margot Page	
2003–04	9	23	3	Margot Page	
2002–03	14	18	3	Margot Page	
2001–02	26	8	2	Margot Page	0–1–1
2000–01	17	14	4	Margot Page	
1999–2000	17	13	3	Margot Page	
1998–99	11	15	2	Margot Page	

== Awards and honors ==
- Jenni Bauer, CHA Defensive Player of the Week (November 16, 2009)
- Jenni Bauer, CHA Defensive Player of the Week (November 30, 2009)
- Jenni Bauer, CHA Defensive Player of the Week (February 1, 2010)
- Jenni Bauer, First Team All-CHA
- Amy Jack, CHA All Tournament Team (2003–2004)
- Amy Jack, CHA Rookie of the Week (October 31, 2002)
- Kathleen Bortuzzo, CHA Rookie of the Week (Week of February 22, 2010)
- Daniela Del Colle, CHA Player of the Week (Week of February 15, 2010)
- Valerie Hall, 2003 CHA Player of the Year
- Valerie Hall, 2003 Student-Athlete of the Year honors
- Valerie Hall led all CHA players in scoring (games played against CHA opponents only) with eight points on five goals and three assists.
- Jenna Hendrikx, CHA Rookie Of The Week Award (Oct 6, 2009)
- Jenna Hendrikx, CHA Rookie Of The Week Award (Oct 26, 2009)
- Jenna Hendrikx, 2010 CHA All-Rookie Team

=== USCHO honors ===
- Ashley Riggs, 2004–05 All USCHO.com Rookie Team

== See also ==
- Niagara Purple Eagles men's ice hockey
