= 2012 NCAA National Collegiate women's ice hockey tournament =

NCAA women's ice hockey postseason tournament

- Teams: 8
- Finals site: AMSOIL Arena, Duluth, Minnesota
- Champions: Minnesota Golden Gophers (3rd title)
- Runner-up: Wisconsin Badgers (6th title game)
- Semifinalists: Cornell Big Red (3rd Frozen Four); Boston College Eagles (3rd Frozen Four)
- Winning coach: Brad Frost (1st title)
- MOP: Noora Räty (Minnesota)
- Attendance: 13,425, 2,439 for Championship Game

The 2012 NCAA National Collegiate women's ice hockey tournament involved eight schools in single-elimination play that determined the national champion of women's NCAA Division I college ice hockey. The Frozen Four were hosted by the Minnesota Duluth Bulldogs at AMSOIL Arena in Duluth, Minnesota. North Dakota reached the NCAA tournament for the first time in program history. The Minnesota Golden Gophers defeated the Wisconsin Badgers 4–2 for their third championship in program history and first since 2005.

== Qualifying teams ==
2012 Qualifying Teams
WCHA, ECAC, Hockey East, CHA

The winners of the ECAC, WCHA, and Hockey East tournaments all received automatic berths to the NCAA tournament. The other five teams were selected at-large. The top four teams were then seeded and received home ice for the quarterfinals.

Seed	School	Conference	Record	Berth type	Appearance	Last bid
1	Wisconsin	WCHA	31–4–2	At-large bid	7th	2011
2	Minnesota	WCHA	31–5–2	Tournament champion	11th	2011
3	Cornell	ECAC	29–4–0	At-large bid	2nd	2011
4	Boston College	Hockey East	23–9–3	At-large bid	4th	2011
	St. Lawrence	ECAC	24–9–4	Tournament champion	8th	2009
	Boston University	Hockey East	27–7–3	Tournament champion	3rd	2011
	North Dakota	WCHA	22–10–3	At-large bid	1st	Never
	Mercyhurst	CHA	23–7–3	At-large bid	8th	2011

== Bracket ==
Quarterfinals held at home sites of seeded teams

National Quarterfinals; March 10
1	Wisconsin	3
Mercyhurst	1
4	Boston College	6
St. Lawrence	3
2	Minnesota	5
North Dakota	1
3	Cornell	8***
Boston University	7

National Semifinals; March 16
1	Wisconsin	6
4	Boston College	2
2	Minnesota	3
3	Cornell	1

National Championship; March 18
1	Wisconsin	2
2	Minnesota	4

Note: * denotes overtime period(s)

== Results ==
=== National Quarterfinals ===
==== (1) Wisconsin vs. Mercyhurst ====
March 10; 7:07	Mercyhurst	1–3 (0–1, 1–0, 0–2)	Wisconsin	Kohl Center; Attendance: 2,946

Game reference

Hillary Pattenden
Goalies
Alex Rigsby
Referee:
Dan Lick
Linesmen:
Dave Lick
Dan Fitzsimons

	0–1	11:48 – Prevost (Decker)
Steadman (Zgoda, Cicero) – 39:20	1–1
	1–2	51:18 – sh – Knight (Prevost)
	1–3	58:45 – en – Decker (Haverstock)

10 min
Penalties
10 min
29
Shots
42

==== (4) Boston College vs. St. Lawrence ====
March 10; 2:00	St. Lawrence	3–6 (0–1, 3–2, 0–3)	Boston College	Kelley Rink; Attendance: 827

Game reference

Carmen MacDonald
Goalies
Corinne Boyles
Referee:
Bill Doiron
Linesmen:
Julie Piacentini
Chris Leavitt

	0–1	16:30 – sh – Carpenter (Field)
Emard (Smith, Sabatine) – 20:20	1–1
Ng (Emond) – 20:40	2–1
Williams (Habscheid, Desrochers) – pp – 23:33	3–1
	3–2	31:00 – pp – Field (Mangene, Burns)
	3–3	39:49 – Bolden (Restuccia)
	3–4	42:23 – Welch
	3–5	55:47 – Wasylk (Motherwell, Restuccia)
	3–6	59:28 – en – Motherwell (Bolden)

8 min
Penalties
6 min
31
Shots
39

==== (2) Minnesota vs. North Dakota ====
March 10; 4:00	North Dakota	1–5 (0–1, 0–3, 1–1)	Minnesota	Ridder Arena; Attendance: 1,630

Game reference

Jorid Dagfinrud
Goalies
Noora Räty
Referees:
Jay Mendel
Robert Ludwig
Linesmen:
Dave Spivey
Tom Jerome

	0–1	1:28 – West (Davis)
	0–2	23:44 – Davis (Erickson, Seeler)
	0–3	30:06 – sh – Kessel
	0–4	36:40 – pp – Erickson (Kessel, Schoullis)
	0–5	43:40 – Schoullis (Erickson, West)
Karvinen (Jakobsen, Lamoureux-Kolls) – pp – 46:07	1–5

16 min
Penalties
16 min
29
Shots
28

==== (3) Cornell vs. Boston University ====
March 10; 2:00	Boston University	7–8 (3OT) (3–1, 1–4, 3–2, 0–0, 0–0, 0–1)	Cornell	Lynah Rink; Attendance: 2,143

Game reference

Kerrin Sperry
Goalies
Lauren Slebodnick
Referee:
Bryan Hicks
Linesmen:
Cameron Lynch
Andrew DiFusco

Poulin (Menard, Tutino) – 4:35	1–0
Tutino (Wakefield, Cardella) – 5:09	2–0
Boucher (Poulin, Tutino) – 16:45	3–0
	3–1	19:15 – Campbell
	3–2	20:10 – pp – Johnston (Saulnier, Jenner)
	3–3	23:31 – Johnston (Saulnier, Gagliardi)
	3–4	24:14 – Fortino (Saulnier, Jenner)
Poulin (Warren) – 35:01	4–4
	4–5	36:08 – Jenner (Johnston, Young)
	4–6	40:18 – Johnston
	4–7	46:19 – pp – Jenner (Johnston, Young)
Menard (Watchorn, Wakefield) – pp – 49:12	5–7
Wakefield (Watchorn, Menard) – pp – 51:06	6–7
Tutino (Watchorn, Poulin) – pp – 58:03	7–7
	7–8	119:50 – Rougeau (Campbell)

20 min
Penalties
16 min
47
Shots
66

=== National Semifinals ===
==== (1) Wisconsin vs. (4) Boston College ====
March 16; 5:07	Boston College	2–6 (1–2, 0–2, 1–2)	Wisconsin	AMSOIL Arena; Attendance: 1,388

Game reference

Corinne Boyles
Goalies
Alex Rigsby
Referees:
Lynch/Hicks
Lou DiFusco
Linesman:
Harrop

Field (Bolden) – 0:57	1–0
	1–1	6:44 – Ammerman (Packer, Brickner)
	1–2	13:47 – sh – Prevost
	1–3	21:34 – Knight (Packer, Kelter)
	1–4	37:21 – Ammerman (Jaminski, Rigsby)
	1–5	47:46 – Ammerman (Prevost, Decker)
Carpenter (Restuccia, Bolden) – pp – 49:54	2–5
	2–6	56:23 – pp – Knight (Decker)

14 min
Penalties
14 min
24
Shots
38

==== (2) Minnesota vs. (3) Cornell ====
March 16; 8:07	Cornell	1–3 (0–2, 1–0, 0–1)	Minnesota	AMSOIL Arena; Attendance: 2,052

Game reference

Amanda Mazzotta
Goalies
Noora Räty
Referees:
Doran/Diacentini
Chris Leavitt
Linesman:
Briget Watkins

	0–1	17:16 – pp – Kessel (Erickson, Schleper)
	0–2	18:29 – pp – Bozek (Schoullis, Kessel)
Gagliardi (Saulnier) – pp – 31:40	1–2
	1–3	59:26 – en – West (Kessel, Ramsey)

12 min
Penalties
6 min
21
Shots
41

=== National Championship ===
==== (1) Wisconsin vs. (2) Minnesota ====
March 18; 3:07	Minnesota	4–2 (3–2, 0–0, 1–0)	Wisconsin	AMSOIL Arena; Attendance: 2,439

Game reference

Noora Räty
Goalies
Alex Rigsby
Referees:
Mendel/Luwig
Tom Jerome
Linesman:
Dave Spivey

Kessel (Gillanders) – 8:45	1–0
Erickson (Davis, West) – 11:23	2–0
	2–1	14:03 – pp – McKeough (Knight, Ammerman)
	2–2	15:43 – Ammerman (Prevost)
West – 18:28	3–2
Erickson (Seeler) – 43:57	4–2

10 min
Penalties
4 min
25
Shots
44

== Tournament awards ==
=== All-Tournament Team ===
- G: Noora Räty*, Minnesota,
- D: Megan Bozek, Minnesota,
- F: Sarah Erickson, Minnesota
- F: Amanda Kessel, Minnesota
- F: Carolyne Prévost, Wisconsin
- F: Brooke Ammerman, Wisconsin

* Most Outstanding Player

== See also ==
- 2012 NCAA Division I Men's Ice Hockey Tournament
- 2012 NCAA Division III Women's Ice Hockey Tournament
- 2012 CIS Women's Ice Hockey Tournament
