= 2015 NCAA National Collegiate women's ice hockey tournament =

NCAA women's ice hockey postseason tournament

- 2015 Women's Frozen Four logo
- Teams: 8
- Finals site: Ridder Arena, Minneapolis, Minnesota
- Champions: Minnesota Golden Gophers (5th title)
- Runner-up: Harvard Crimson (4th title game)
- Semifinalists: Wisconsin Badgers (8th Frozen Four); Boston College Eagles (5th Frozen Four)
- Winning coach: Brad Frost (3rd title)
- MOP: Hannah Brandt (Minnesota)
- Attendance: 6,800, 3,400 for Championship Game

The 2015 NCAA National Collegiate Women's Ice Hockey Tournament involved eight schools in single-elimination play to determine the national champion of women's NCAA Division I college ice hockey. The quarterfinals were contested at the campuses of the seeded teams on March 14, 2015. The Frozen Four was played on March 20 and 22, 2015 at Ridder Arena in Minneapolis, Minnesota with the University of Minnesota as the host. Quinnipiac and RIT (previously of NCAA Division III) each reached the NCAA National Collegiate tournament for the first time in program history.

The tournament was won by Minnesota with a 4–1 win over Harvard, giving the Golden Gophers their fifth overall title and third in four years.

== Qualifying teams ==
2015 Qualifying Teams
WCHA, ECAC, Hockey East, CHA

For the first time, the winners of all four Division I conference tournaments received automatic berths to the NCAA tournament. The other four teams were selected at-large. The top four teams were then seeded and received home ice for the quarterfinals.

Seed	School	Conference	Record	Berth type	Appearance	Last bid
1	Minnesota	WCHA	32–3–4	At-large bid	13th	2014
2	Boston College	Hockey East	33–2–2	At-large bid	7th	2014
3	Harvard	ECAC	25–5–3	Tournament champion	11th	2014
4	Wisconsin	WCHA	28–6–4	Tournament champion	9th	2014
	Boston University	Hockey East	25–8–3	Tournament champion	6th	2014
	Quinnipiac	ECAC	26–8–3	At-large bid	1st	Never
	Clarkson	ECAC	24–10–3	At-large bid	4th	2014
	RIT	CHA	15–18–5	Tournament champion	1st	Never

== Bracket ==
Quarterfinals held at home sites of seeded teams

National Quarterfinals; March 14
1	Minnesota	6
RIT	2
4	Wisconsin	5
Boston University	1
2	Boston College	5
Clarkson	1
3	Harvard	5
Quinnipiac	0

National Semifinals; March 20
1	Minnesota	3
4	Wisconsin	1
2	Boston College	1
3	Harvard	2

National Championship; March 22
1	Minnesota	4
3	Harvard	1

Note: * denotes overtime period(s)

== Results ==
=== National Quarterfinals ===
==== (1) Minnesota vs. RIT ====
March 14; 4:04	RIT	2–6 (1–3, 0–2, 1–1)	Minnesota	Ridder Arena; Attendance: 1,796

Game reference

Ali Binnington
Goalies
Amanda Leveille
Referees:
Robert Ludwig
Krissy Morrison
Linesmen:
Casey Enge
Josh Brown

	0–1	3:45 – McMillen (Cameranesi, Brandt)
	0–2	4:33 – Schipper (Piazza, Garzone)
Payerl (Bulleid) – pp – 9:35	1–2
	1–3	13:23 – pp – Ramsey (Brandt, McMillen)
	1–4	28:28 – Menefee (Schipper, Ramsey)
	1–5	34:02 – pp – Brandt (Menefee, Schipper)
Payerl (Bulleid) – 57:41	2–5
	2–6	59:26 – sh – Stecklein

14 min
Penalties
36 min
19
Shots
52

==== (4) Wisconsin vs. Boston University ====
March 14; 2:07	Boston University	1–5 (0–2, 0–2, 1–1)	Wisconsin	LaBahn Arena; Attendance: 2,047

Game reference

Victoria Hanson
Mia Becker
Goalies
Ann-Renée Desbiens
Referee:
Ray Doocy
Linesmen:
Dave Spivey
Scott Roth

	0–1	2:56 – Pankowski (Channell)
	0–2	15:54 – Zgraja (Rolfes, Turnbull)
	0–3	35:43 – Pankowski (Sylvester, Zgraja)
	0–4	38:59 – Clark (Wellhausen)
	0–5	52:07 – pp – Ryan (Turnbull, Burke)
Bach (Leslie) – 57:07	1–5

14 min
Penalties
19 min
21
Shots
48

==== (2) Boston College vs. Clarkson ====
March 14; 1:00	Clarkson	1–5 (0–1, 0–2, 1–2)	Boston College	Conte Forum; Attendance: 803

Game reference

Shea Tiley
Goalies
Kaitlin Burt
Referee:
Will Harrop
Linesmen:
Bryan Hicks
Peter Terreri

	0–1	11:28 – Carpenter (Skarupa, Kent)
	0–2	20:23 – Carpenter (Skarupa)
	0–3	35:55 – Capizzano (Field, Johnson)
Matteucci (Mercer) – 41:50	1–3
	1–4	53:58 – Skarupa (Carpenter)
	1–5	58:00 – Miano (Skarupa)

10 min
Penalties
6 min
21
Shots
31

==== (3) Harvard vs. Quinnipiac ====
March 14; 4:00	Quinnipiac	0–5 (0–2, 0–1, 0–2)	Harvard	Bright Hockey Center; Attendance: 685

Game reference

Chelsea Laden
Sydney Rossman
Goalies
Emerance Maschmeyer
Referees:
Tom Quinn
Shane Belanger
Linesmen:
Adam Saniech
Paul Sacco

0–1	4:42 – Frazer (Mastel, Laing)
0–2	9:05 – Mullins (Heffernan)
0–3	23:37 – Reber (Gedman, Parker)
0–4	42:42 – pp – Daniels (Frazer, Fry)
0–5	52:00 – Heffernan (Laing)

2 min
Penalties
6 min
20
Shots
23

=== National Semifinals ===
==== (1) Minnesota vs. (4) Wisconsin ====
March 20; 5:04	Wisconsin	1–3 (0–0, 1–3, 0–0)	Minnesota	Ridder Arena; Attendance: 3,400

Game reference

Ann-Renée Desbiens
Goalies
Amanda Leveille
Referees:
Thomas Quinn
Shane Belanger
Linesmen:
Adam Staniech
Paul Sacco

Pankowski (Clark) – 20:52	1–0
	1–1	28:53 – Brandt (Cameranesi, Menefee)
	1–2	30:52 – Menefee (Wolfe, Brandt)
	1–3	36:54 – pp – Pannek (Menefee, Brandt)

4 min
Penalties
2 min
35
Shots
23

==== (2) Boston College vs. (3) Harvard ====
March 20; 8:04	Harvard	2–1 (0–0, 0–0, 2–1)	Boston College	Ridder Arena; Attendance: 3,400

Game reference

Emerance Maschmeyer
Goalies
Kaitlin Burt
Referees:
Robert Ludwig
Krissy Morrison
Linesmen:
Scott Roth
Mike Diebold

46:34 – Armstrong (Daniels)	1–0
53:00 – sh – Parker (Edney)	2–0
	2–1	Field (Anastos) – 55:37

19 min
Penalties
4 min
21
Shots
44

=== National Championship ===
==== (1) Minnesota vs. (3) Harvard ====
March 22; 3:04	Harvard	1–4 (0–1, 0–0, 1–3)	Minnesota	Ridder Arena; Attendance: 3,400

Game reference

Emerance Maschmeyer
Goalies
Amanda Leveille
Referees:
Shane Belanger
Tom Quinn
Linesmen:
Paul Sacco
Adam Staniech

	0–1	19:09 – Wolfe (Cameranesi, Bona)
	0–2	48:50 – Brandt (Menefee)
Edney (Picard) – 55:06	1–2
	1–3	56:54 – Lorence (Pannek)
	1–4	58:12 – Bona (Stecklein, Leveille)

8 min
Penalties
6 min
20
Shots
33

== Tournament awards ==
=== All-Tournament Team ===
- G: Amanda Leveille, Minnesota
- D: Megan Wolfe, Minnesota
- D: Sarah Edney, Harvard
- F: Hannah Brandt*, Minnesota
- F: Maryanne Menefee, Minnesota
- F: Dani Cameranesi, Minnesota

* Most Outstanding Player

== See also ==
- 2015 NCAA Division I Men's Ice Hockey Tournament
