= Alex Cavallini =

American ice hockey player (born 1992)

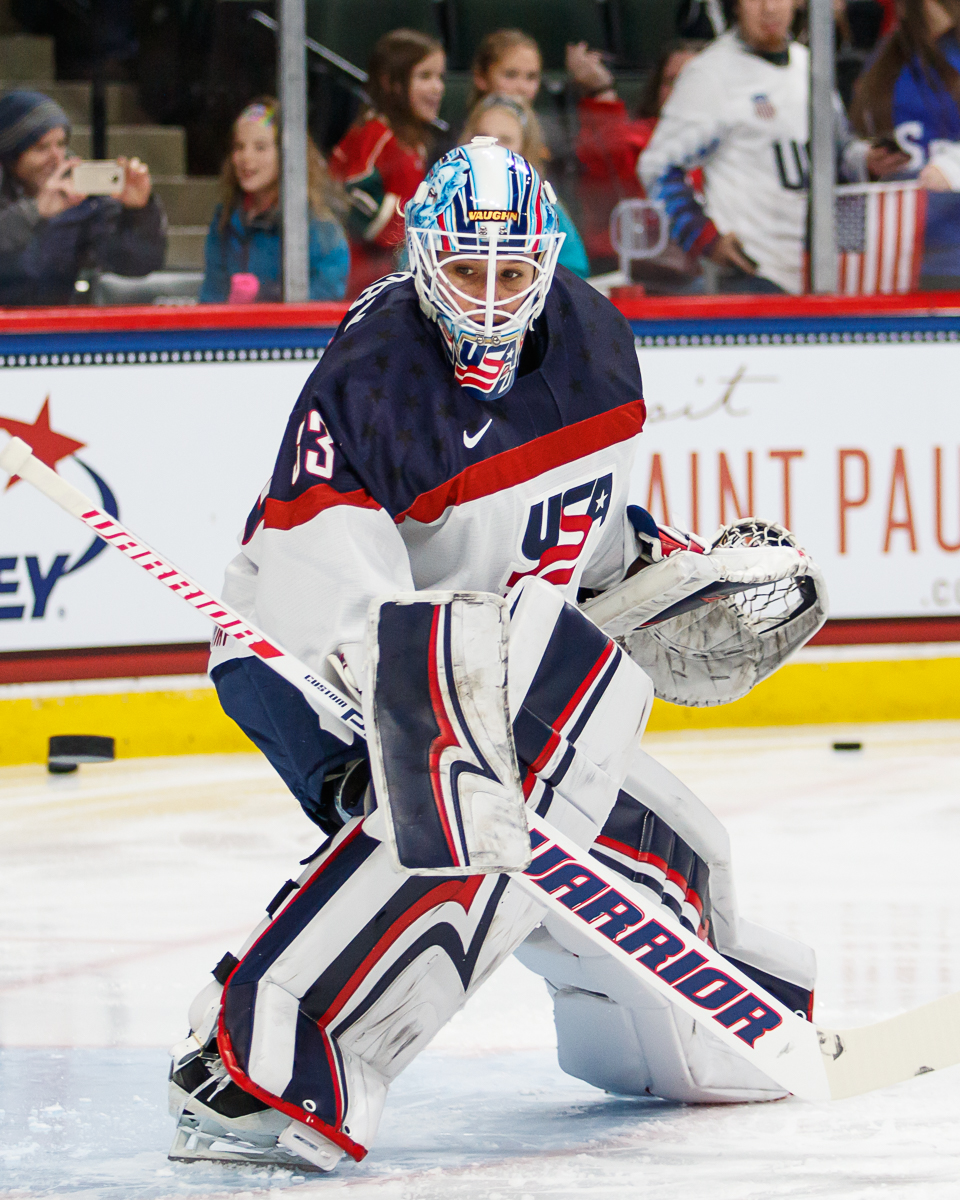
- Cavallini playing for the United States during the 2017 IIHF Women's World Championship
- Born: January 3, 1992 (age 34) Delafield, Wisconsin, U.S.
- Height: 5 ft 7 in (170 cm)
- Weight: 154 lb (70 kg; 11 st 0 lb)
- Position: Goaltender
- Caught: Left
- Played for: Wisconsin Badgers; Minnesota Whitecaps; Calgary Inferno
- National team: United States
- Playing career: 2010–2021
Medal record
Olympic Games
| Gold medal – first place | 2018 Pyeongchang | Team |
| Silver medal – second place | 2022 Beijing | Team |
World Championships
| Gold medal – first place | 2013 Canada |
| Gold medal – first place | 2015 Sweden |
| Gold medal – first place | 2016 Canada |
| Gold medal – first place | 2017 United States |
| Gold medal – first place | 2019 Finland |
| Silver medal – second place | 2021 Canada |
World U18 Championships
| Gold medal – first place | 2009 Germany |

Alexandria Cavallini (née Rigsby born January 3, 1992) is an American former professional ice hockey goaltender.

She has competed in numerous tournaments for the United States women's national ice hockey team. She is the first goaltender in USA Hockey history to have competed with the US National Under-18, Under-22, and Senior women's teams. She competed for the Wisconsin Badgers women's ice hockey program 2010–2014, and was on the roster of the Minnesota Whitecaps. She is also the first American-born goaltender to have won an Olympic Gold Medal, an IIHF World Championship, and the Clarkson Cup, having played with the victorious Calgary Inferno in the 2019 Clarkson Cup Finals.

== Playing career ==
Cavallini played boys hockey from age six, including AAA boys hockey from age 10. As a freshman in high school, she played for the Chicago Mission AAA Boys Bantam Majors. That team won state and regional championships and participated in the USA Hockey National Championships. In addition to hockey, Cavallini also played varsity girls lacrosse for Arrowhead Head School, in which she won two state titles in 2007 and 2008

Alex Cavallini became the first woman ever to be drafted in the United States Hockey League when she was selected in the 16th round, 199th overall by the Chicago Steel. Of note, the Steel also drafted Jake Chelios, son of Red Wings defenceman Chris Chelios in the 4th round, 49th overall and David Bondra, son of sniper Peter Bondra in the 7th round, 82nd overall. Cavallini played the previous two seasons with the Milwaukee Admirals Midget Minor boys team.

=== NCAA ===
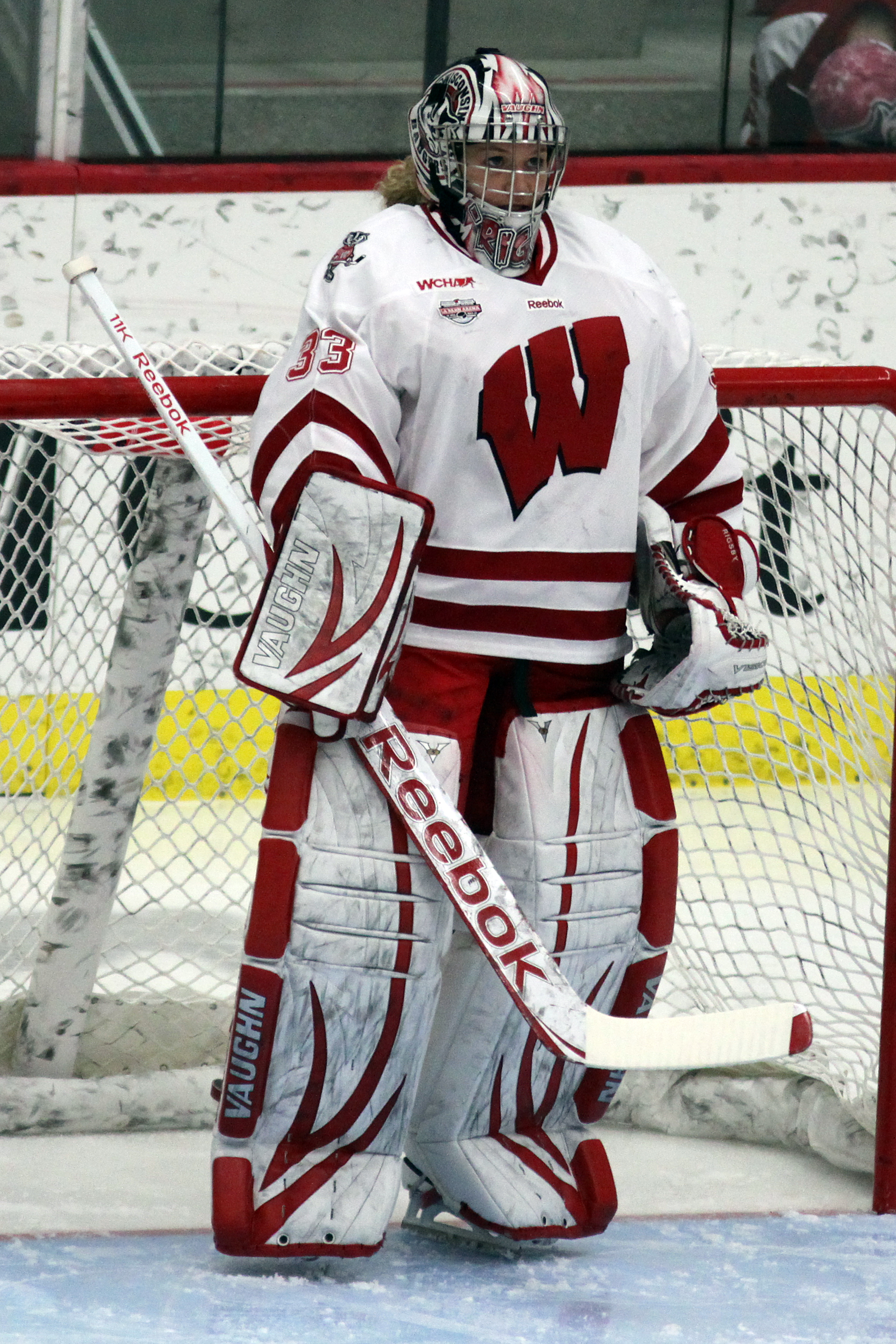
Goaltending for the Wisconsin Badgers women's ice hockey team in January 2013

On December 10, 2010 Alex Cavallini earned her third collegiate shutout in a conference road victory at St. Cloud State. She improved her won-loss record to 11–1–0. At 11–1–0, Cavallini's .917 winning percentage tops the WCHA and is fourth in the nation. She also ranks third in the WCHA with a 1.86 goals-against average and is fifth in the league with a .919 save percentage.

At the midway point of her rookie season, she played in 10 games with an 8–1–0 record. Statistically, she has made 194 total saves and allowed 18 goals for a .915 save percentage and a 1.93 goals against average. In her collegiate debut, she earned her first career shutout (a 6–0 win over RPI on October 2). On October 8, Cavallini earned her first WCHA victory with a 7–1 victory over Bemidji State. She made a season-high 37 saves in a 3–2 overtime win against Minnesota Duluth on November 26.

On January 28–29, 2011 she made a combined 50 saves and allowed three goals as the top-ranked Badgers earned a tie and victory against Minnesota. She made 23 saves on January 28 in a 2–2 overtime tie. The following day, she made 27 saves while earning her 17th victory of the season. The match was played before a women's college hockey record crowd of 10,668. Over the two-game period, she had a .943 saves percentage and had four shutout periods, including the one 5:00 overtime segment. She is now unbeaten in her last 11 games, and her .900 winning percentage leads the WCHA. Her 1.95 GAA is first in the WCHA.

In her first appearance in the NCAA Tournament on March 12, 2011, she made 29 saves against the defending NCAA champion Minnesota-Duluth Bulldogs. With the victory, Cavallini improved her record to 25–1–2.

She played in the 2011 NCAA Women's Division I Ice hockey Tournament championship game and made 15 saves to help the Badgers win their fourth Frozen Four title in six years. She finished her rookie season with a record of 27–1–1.

She graduated from the Badgers as the program's all-time leader in wins with 100, minutes played with 7,881:09, and saves with 3,126. Her .941 save percentage is tied for first in program history. A 3–1 victory over Bemidji State helped Cavallini surpass Jessie Vetter for the Badgers mark in career wins.

=== Team USA ===
She participated in the 2009 IIHF Under 18 Women's World Championship and won a gold medal. Statistically, she had a .947 saves percentage with a 1.28 goals against average. In addition, she participated in the 2008 and 2009 USA Hockey Women's National Festival. From 2006 to 2009, she participated in USA Hockey National Development Camps.

On January 2, 2022, Cavallini was named to Team USA's roster to represent the United States at the 2022 Winter Olympics.

=== CWHL ===
Claimed by the Calgary Inferno in the fourth round of the 2018 CWHL Draft, Cavallini became their starting goaltender for the 2018–19 season. In her first season of professional hockey, she earned All-Star recognition, playing with Emerance Maschmeyer for Team Purple in the 4th Canadian Women's Hockey League All-Star Game. Coincidentally, the two played against each other in the 2019 Clarkson Cup Finals, with Maschmeyer starting for Montreal. Of note, Calgary emerged victorious, defeating Maschmeyer and Montreal by a 5–2 count.

=== PWHPA ===
Skating for Team New Hampshire during the 2020–21 PWHPA season, Decker participated in a PWHPA Dream Gap Tour event at New York's Madison Square Garden on February 28, 2021, the first women's ice hockey event at the venue. Playing for a team sponsored by the Women's Sports Foundation, Cavallini stopped 32 of 35 shots in a 4–3 win.

== Personal life ==
In July 2019, she married her longtime boyfriend, Aidan Cavallini, who played hockey at the University of Wisconsin. Her father-in-law is Gino Cavallini, who played 593 NHL games.

== Career statistics ==
=== International ===
Note: GP = Games played; Min, TOI = Minutes played; W = Wins; L = Losses; T,T/OT = Ties; OTL = Overtime losses; GA = Goals-against; GAA = Goals-against average; SO = Shutouts; SV% = Save percentage;

| | | | | Regular season |
| Year | Team | Event | Result | GP | W | L | T/OT | MIN | GA | SO | GAA | SV% |
|---|---|---|---|---|---|---|---|---|---|---|---|---|
| 2022 | USA | OG | 2nd place, silver medalist(s) | 4 | 3 | 1 | 0 | 236:51 | 5 | 0 | 1.27 | 0.923 |

== Awards and honors ==
- Directorate Award, Best Goaltender, 2009 IIHF Under 18 Women's World Championships
- Directorate Award, Best Goaltender, 2010 IIHF Under 18 Women's World Championships
- Runner-up: 2010 WCHA Pre-Season Rookie of the Year
- WCHA Defensive Player of the Week (Week of December 15, 2010)
- WCHA Rookie of the Week (Week of February 2, 2011)
- 2011 NCAA Frozen Four All-Tournament Team
- WCHA Defensive Player of the Week, (Week of October 18, 2011)
- WCHA Defensive Player of the Week (Week of October 25, 2011)
- WCHA Defensive Player of the Week (Week of February 1, 2012)
- 2012–13 Second Team All-America selection
- 2014 Wisconsin Badgers Female Athlete of the Year
- 2014 AHCA first-team All-American
- 2014 WCHA Scholar-Athlete
- 2014 All-WCHA Academic team
- 2014 first-team All-WCHA
- 2014 All-USCHO first team.
