= 2005 NCAA National Collegiate women's ice hockey tournament =

NCAA women's ice hockey postseason tournament

- 2005 Frozen Four logo
- Teams: 8
- Finals site: Whittemore Center, Durham, New Hampshire
- Champions: Minnesota Golden Gophers (2nd title)
- Runner-up: Harvard Crimson (3rd title game)
- Semifinalists: Dartmouth Big Green (4th Frozen Four); St. Lawrence Saints (3rd Frozen Four)
- Winning coach: Laura Halldorson (2nd title)
- MOP: Natalie Darwitz (Minnesota)
- Attendance: 15,352, 2,056 for Championship Game

The 2005 NCAA National Collegiate Women's Ice Hockey Tournament involved eight schools playing in single-elimination play to determine the national champion of women's NCAA Division I college ice hockey. The tournament began on March 18, 2005, and ended with the championship game on March 27.

The 2005 tournament was the first to feature eight teams. The highest four seeds were invited to host first round competition for the right to advance to the Frozen Four. The expanded field also allowed for the creation of auto-bids for each of the four conferences in Division I women's hockey at the time.

The 2005 tournament was also the last to feature a consolation game. From 2006 forward, both teams losing semi-final games were awarded third place.

== Qualifying teams ==
2005 Qualifying Teams
WCHA, ECAC, Hockey East, CHA

The at-large bids, along with the seeding for each team in the tournament, were announced on Sunday, March 13.

Seed	School	Conference	Record	Berth Type	Appearance	Last bid
1	Minnesota	WCHA	33–2–2	Tournament champion	4th	2004
2	Minnesota Duluth	WCHA	22–6–4	At-large bid	4th	2003
	Harvard	ECAC	24–6–3	Tournament champion	4th	2004
	Dartmouth	ECAC	26–6–0	At-large bid	4th	2004
	Wisconsin	WCHA	28–8–1	At-large bid	1st	Never
	Mercyhurst	CHA	26–7–5	At-large bid	1st	Never
	St. Lawrence	ECAC	26–7–5	At-large bid	3rd	2004
	Providence	Hockey East	21–10–5	Tournament champion	1st	Never

== Brackets ==
National Quarterfinals; March 18 – 20
1	Minnesota	6
Providence	1
Wisconsin	3
Dartmouth	4
Harvard	5***
Mercyhurst	4
St. Lawrence	3*
2	Minnesota Duluth	2

National Semifinals; March 25
1	Minnesota	7
Dartmouth	2
Harvard	4
St. Lawrence	1

National Championship; March 27
1	Minnesota	4
Harvard	3
Third place
Dartmouth	1
St. Lawrence	5

Note: * denotes overtime period(s)
Note: The team in italics is the home team in the first round.

== Tournament awards ==
=== All-Tournament Team ===
- G: Ali Boe, Harvard
- D: Lyndsay Wall, Minnesota
- D: Caitlin Cahow, Harvard
- F: Sarah Vaillancourt, Harvard
- F: Krissy Wendell, Minnesota
- F: Natalie Darwitz*, Minnesota

* Most Outstanding Player
