= 2001 NCAA National Collegiate women's ice hockey tournament =

NCAA women's ice hockey postseason tournament

- 2001 Frozen Four logo
- Teams: 4
- Finals site: Mariucci Arena, Minneapolis, Minnesota
- Champions: Minnesota Duluth Bulldogs (1st title)
- Runner-up: St. Lawrence Saints (1st title game)
- Semifinalists: Dartmouth Big Green (1st Frozen Four); Harvard Crimson (1st Frozen Four)
- Winning coach: Shannon Miller (1st title)
- MOP: Maria Rooth (Minnesota Duluth)
- Attendance: 5178, 3,079 for Championship Game

The 2001 NCAA National Collegiate Women's Ice Hockey Tournament involved four schools playing in single-elimination play to determine the national champion of women's NCAA Division I college ice hockey. The 2001 tournament was the first women's ice hockey tournament to be sponsored by the NCAA. The tournament began on March 23, 2001, and ended with the championship game on March 25. The Minnesota Duluth Bulldogs defeated the St. Lawrence Saints 4–2 to win the tournament.

== Qualifying teams ==
2001 Qualifying Teams
WCHA, ECAC

The at-large bids, along with the seeding for each team in the tournament, were announced on Sunday, March 18.

Seed	School	Conference	Record	Berth Type
1	Dartmouth	ECAC	26–3–1	Tournament champion
2	Minnesota Duluth	WCHA	26–5–4	Tournament champion
3	Harvard	ECAC	23–10–0	At-large bid
4	St. Lawrence	ECAC	23–7–3	At-large bid

== Brackets ==
=== Frozen Four – Minneapolis, Minnesota ===
National Semifinals; March 23
4	St. Lawrence	3
1	Dartmouth	1
3	Harvard	3
2	Minnesota Duluth	6

National Championship; March 25
4	St. Lawrence	2
2	Minnesota Duluth	4
Consolation Game
1	Dartmouth	2
3	Harvard	3

== Results ==
=== National Semifinals ===
==== Dartmouth vs. St. Lawrence ====
March 23	Dartmouth	1–3 (0–3, 0–0, 1–0)	St. Lawrence	Mariucci Arena

Game reference

Amy Ferguson / Meaghan Cahill
Goalies
Rachel Barrie

	0–1	4:34 – Fiacco (Simard)
	0–2	5:45 – pp – Chera Marshall (Powers, Kingsbury)
	0–3	18:47 – pp – Jessica Wilson (Sargeant)
Haggard (Pietrangelo – pp – 45:41	1–3

4 min
Penalties
4 min
32
Shots
17

==== Harvard vs. Minnesota Duluth ====
March 23	Harvard	3–6 (0–0, 1–1, 2–5)	Minnesota Duluth	Mariucci Arena; Attendance: 2,099

Game reference

Jessica Ruddock
Goalies
Tuula Puputti

	0–1	22:38 – pp – Sanna Peura (Brittny Ralph, Hanne Sikio)
Tammy Shewchuk (Tara Dunn, Pam Van Reesema) – pp – 37:52	1–1
	1–2	41:18 – Erika Holst (Maria Rooth)
	1–3	42:51 – Maria Rooth (Joanne Eustace, Laurie Alexander)
	1–4	43:46 – Hanne Sikio ((Sanna Peura, Erika Holst)
	1–5	47:52 – Maria Rooth
Jennifer Botterill (Tammy Shewchuk) – 50:55	2–5
Tammy Shewchuk (Jamie Hagerman) – 52:16	3–5
	3–6	58:58 – Maria Rooth (Joanne Eustace, Laurie Alexander)

4 min
Penalties
2 min
31
Shots
36

=== National Championship ===
March 25	St. Lawrence	2–4 (1–1, 0–2, 1–1)	Minnesota Duluth	Mariucci Arena; Attendance: 3,079

Game reference

Rachel Barrie
Goalies
Tuula Puputti

Amanda Sargeant (Jessica Wilson, Shannon Smith) – pp – 11:22	1–0
	1–1	17:40 – Jennifer Hempel (Navada Russell)
	1–2	25:36 – Maria Rooth (Navada Russell)
	1–3	36:05 – Hanne Sikio (Sanna Peura)
	1–4	45:22 – Laurie Alexander (Maria Rooth)
Isabelle Chartrand (Gina Kingsbury) – pp – 59:06	2–4

6 min
Penalties
8 min
31
Shots
36

== Tournament awards ==
=== All-Tournament Team ===
- G: Tuula Puputti, Minnesota Duluth
- D: Isabelle Chartrand, St. Lawrence
- D: Brittny Ralph, Minnesota Duluth
- F: Amanda Sargeant, St. Lawrence
- F: Maria Rooth*, Minnesota Duluth
- F: Tammy Lee Shewchuk, Harvard

* Most Outstanding Player
