= 2003 NCAA National Collegiate women's ice hockey tournament =

NCAA women's ice hockey postseason tournament

- Teams: 4
- Finals site: Duluth Entertainment Convention Center, Duluth, Minnesota
- Champions: Minnesota Duluth Bulldogs (3rd title)
- Runner-up: Harvard Crimson (1st title game)
- Semifinalists: Dartmouth Big Green (2nd Frozen Four); Minnesota Golden Gophers (2nd Frozen Four)
- Winning coach: Shannon Miller (3rd title)
- MOP: Caroline Ouellette (Minnesota Duluth)
- Attendance: 5,167

The 2003 NCAA National Collegiate Women's Ice Hockey Tournament involved four schools playing in single-elimination play to determine the national champion of women's NCAA Division I college ice hockey. It began on March 21, 2003, and ended with the championship game on March 23. A total of four games were played. The Minnesota Duluth Bulldogs defeated the Harvard Crimson 4–3 in double overtime for their third straight national championship. As of 2026, they are the only women's hockey team to have won the NCAA tournament in three consecutive years. This was the first women's hockey final to go to overtime and the only one until 2010.

== Qualifying teams ==
2003 Qualifying Teams
WCHA, ECAC

Seed	School	Conference	Record	Berth Type	Appearance	Last bid
1	Minnesota Duluth	WCHA	29–3–2	Tournament champion	3rd	2002
2	Harvard	ECAC	30–2–1	Tournament champion	2nd	2001
3	Minnesota	WCHA	27–7–1	At-large bid	2nd	2002
4	Dartmouth	ECAC	26–7–0	At-large bid	2nd	2001

== NCAA Frozen Four ==
National Semifinals; March 21
2	Harvard	6
3	Minnesota	1
1	Minnesota Duluth	5
4	Dartmouth	2

National Championship; March 23
2	Harvard	3
1	Minnesota Duluth	4**
Consolation Game
3	Minnesota	2
4	Dartmouth	4

Note: * denotes overtime period(s)

The championship game was attended by 5,167. This set a new record for single-game attendance in NCAA Division I women's ice hockey, which would not be surpassed until January 26, 2008 (when 5,377 attended a Wisconsin home game at the Kohl Center against the St. Cloud State).

== Notes ==
- UMD made women's hockey history as the Bulldogs won their third straight NCAA Frozen Four tournament. The Bulldogs defeated Harvard in a double overtime win 4–3. The game was held in Duluth, Minnesota in front of the largest crowd in women's hockey NCAA history (5,167). Nora Tallus scored the game winner 4:19 into the second overtime.

== Tournament awards ==
=== All-Tournament Team ===
- G: Amy Ferguson, Dartmouth
- D: Julie Chu, Harvard
- D: Angela Ruggiero, Harvard
- F: Caroline Ouellette*, Minnesota Duluth
- F: Jenny Potter, Minnesota Duluth
- F: Hanne Sikiö, Minnesota Duluth

* Most Outstanding Player
