= 2007 NCAA National Collegiate women's ice hockey tournament =

NCAA women's ice hockey postseason tournament

- Teams: 8
- Finals site: Herb Brooks Arena, Lake Placid, New York
- Champions: Wisconsin Badgers (2nd title)
- Runner-up: Minnesota Duluth Bulldogs (4th title game)
- Semifinalists: Boston College Eagles (1st Frozen Four); St. Lawrence Saints (5th Frozen Four)
- Winning coach: Mark Johnson (2nd title)
- Attendance: 3,355 for Championship Game

The 2007 NCAA National Collegiate Women's Ice Hockey Tournament involved eight schools playing in single-elimination play to determine the national champion of women's NCAA Division I college ice hockey. It began on March 9, 2007, and ended with the championship game on March 18. The quarterfinals were conducted at the homes of the seeded teams, and the Frozen Four was conducted at Lake Placid, NY. A total of seven games were played. Wisconsin defeated Minnesota Duluth 4-1 to win the championship.

== Qualifying teams ==
2007 Qualifying Teams
WCHA, ECAC, Hockey East, CHA

The winners of the ECAC, WCHA, and Hockey East tournaments all received automatic berths to the NCAA tournament. The other five teams were selected at-large. The top four teams were then seeded and received home ice for the quarterfinals.

| Seed | School | Conference | Record | Berth type | Appearance | Last bid |
|---|---|---|---|---|---|---|
| 1 | Wisconsin | WCHA | 33–1–4 | Tournament champion | 3rd | 2006 |
| 2 | Mercyhurst | CHA | 33–1–3 | At-large bid | 3rd | 2006 |
| 3 | Dartmouth | ECAC | 27–4–2 | Tournament champion | 5th | 2005 |
| 4 | New Hampshire | Hockey East | 28–3–5 | Tournament champion | 2nd | 2006 |
| | St. Lawrence | ECAC | 28–7–3 | At-large bid | 4th | 2006 |
| | Boston College | Hockey East | 23–9–2 | At-large bid | 1st | Never |
| | Minnesota Duluth | WCHA | 22–10–4 | At-large bid | 6th | 2006 |
| | Harvard | ECAC | 23–7–2 | At-large bid | 6th | 2006 |

== Bracket ==
Quarterfinals held at home sites of seeded teams

National Quarterfinals; March 9 – 10
1 | Wisconsin | 1****
Harvard | 0
4 | New Hampshire | 2
St. Lawrence | 6
2 | Mercyhurst | 2
Minnesota Duluth | 3*
3 | Dartmouth | 2
Boston College | 3**

National Semifinals; March 16
1 | Wisconsin | 4
St. Lawrence | 0
Minnesota Duluth | 4**
Boston College | 3

National Championship; March 18
1 | Wisconsin | 4
Minnesota Duluth | 1

Note: * denotes overtime period(s)

== Tournament awards ==
=== All-Tournament Team ===
- G: Jessie Vetter, Wisconsin
- D: Bobbi-Jo Slusar, Wisconsin
- D: Meaghan Mikkelson, Wisconsin
- F: Jinelle Zaugg, Wisconsin
- F: Jessica Koizumi, Minnesota Duluth
- F: Sara Bauer*, Wisconsin

* Most Outstanding Player
