= 2006 NCAA National Collegiate women's ice hockey tournament =

NCAA women's ice hockey postseason tournament

- Teams: 8
- Finals site: Ridder Arena, Minneapolis, Minnesota
- Champions: Wisconsin Badgers (1st title)
- Runner-up: Minnesota Golden Gophers (3rd title game)
- Semifinalists: New Hampshire Wildcats (1st Frozen Four); St. Lawrence Saints (4th Frozen Four)
- Winning coach: Mark Johnson (1st title)
- MOP: Jessie Vetter (Wisconsin)
- Attendance: 4,701 for Championship Game

The 2006 NCAA National Collegiate Women's Ice Hockey Tournament involved eight schools playing in single-elimination play to determine the national champion of women's NCAA Division I college ice hockey. It began on March 17, 2006, and ended with the championship game on March 26. The quarterfinals were conducted at the homes of the teams considered to be higher seeds, although no seed was given for either team in two of the games. The Frozen Four was conducted in Minneapolis. A total of seven games were played. Jessie Vetter was named the Most Outstanding Player to become the first goaltender to win the honor.

== Qualifying teams ==
2006 Qualifying Teams
WCHA, ECAC, Hockey East, CHA

The winners of the ECAC, WCHA, and Hockey East tournaments all received automatic berths to the NCAA tournament. The other five teams were selected at-large. The top two teams were then seeded, and four teams received home ice for the quarterfinals.

Seed	School	Conference	Record	Berth type	Appearance	Last bid
1	New Hampshire	Hockey East	32–2–1	Tournament champion	1st	Never
2	Wisconsin	WCHA	32–5–1	Tournament champion	2nd	2005
	St. Lawrence	ECAC	30–4–2	Tournament champion	3rd	2005
	Minnesota	WCHA	27–10–1	At-large bid	5th	2005
	Princeton	ECAC	21–7–4	At-large bid	1st	Never
	Minnesota Duluth	WCHA	22–8–3	At-large bid	5th	2005
	Mercyhurst	CHA	23–7–7	At-large bid	2nd	2005
	Harvard	ECAC	18–12–4	At-large bid	5th	2005

== Bracket ==
National Quarterfinals; March 17 – 18
1	New Hampshire	3
Harvard	1
Minnesota	4
Princeton	0
St. Lawrence	1
Minnesota Duluth	0
2	Wisconsin	2**
Mercyhurst	1

National Semifinals; March 24
1	New Hampshire	4
Minnesota	5
St. Lawrence	0
2	Wisconsin	1

National Championship; March 26
Minnesota	0
2	Wisconsin	3

Note: * denotes overtime period(s)
Note: The team in italics is the home team in the first round.

== Tournament awards ==
=== All-Tournament Team ===
- G: Jessie Vetter*, Wisconsin
- D: Bobbi-Jo Slusar, Wisconsin
- D: Ashley Albrecht, Minnesota
- F: Jinelle Zaugg, Wisconsin
- F: Bobbi Ross, Minnesota
- F: Jennifer Hitchcock, New Hampshire

* Most Outstanding Player
