= 2008 NCAA National Collegiate women's ice hockey tournament =

NCAA women's ice hockey postseason tournament

- Teams: 8
- Finals site: DECC Arena, Duluth, Minnesota
- Champions: Minnesota Duluth Bulldogs (4th title)
- Runner-up: Wisconsin Badgers (3rd title game)
- Semifinalists: Harvard Crimson (5th Frozen Four); New Hampshire Wildcats (2nd Frozen Four)
- Winning coach: Shannon Miller (4th title)
- MOP: Kim Martin (Minnesota Duluth)
- Attendance: 4,031 for Championship Game

The 2008 NCAA National Collegiate Women's Ice Hockey Tournament involved eight schools playing in single-elimination play to determine the national champion of women's NCAA Division I college ice hockey. The quarterfinals were conducted at the homes of the seeded teams and the Frozen Four was conducted in Duluth, MN It began on March 14, 2009, and ended with the championship game on March 22.

== Qualifying teams ==
2008 Qualifying Teams
WCHA, ECAC, Hockey East, CHA

The winners of the ECAC, WCHA, and Hockey East tournaments all received automatic berths to the NCAA tournament. The other five teams were selected at-large. The top four teams were then seeded and received home ice for the quarterfinals.

Seed	School	Conference	Record	Berth type	Appearance	Last bid
1	Harvard	ECAC	30–1–1	Tournament champion	7th	2007
2	Minnesota Duluth	WCHA	31–4–1	Tournament champion	7th	2007
3	New Hampshire	Hockey East	26–7–3	Tournament champion	3rd	2007
4	Minnesota	WCHA	27–6–4	At-large bid	6th	2006
	Wisconsin	WCHA	27–7–3	At-large bid	4th	2007
	St. Lawrence	ECAC	28–9–1	At-large bid	5th	2007
	Mercyhurst	CHA	27–7–3	At-large bid	4th	2007
	Dartmouth	ECAC	17–7–7	At-large bid	6th	2007

== Bracket ==
Quarterfinals held at home sites of seeded teams

National Quarterfinals; March 15
1	Harvard	5
Dartmouth	1
4	Minnesota	2
Wisconsin	3*
2	Minnesota Duluth	5
Mercyhurst	4
3	New Hampshire	3*
St. Lawrence	2

National Semifinals; March 20
1	Harvard	1
Wisconsin	4
2	Minnesota Duluth	3
3	New Hampshire	2

National Championship; March 22
Wisconsin	0
2	Minnesota Duluth	4

Note: * denotes overtime period(s)

== Results ==
=== National Quarterfinals ===
==== (1) Harvard vs. Dartmouth ====
March 15; 2:00	Dartmouth	1–5 (0–1, 1–2, 0–2)	Harvard	Bright-Landry Hockey Center; Attendance: 1,497

Carli Clemis
Goalies
Christina Kessler
Referee:
Scott Leavitt
Linesmen:
Todd Aldous
Larry Legualt

	0–1	19:27 – Brine (Vaillancourt, Farni)
	0–2	29:34 – pp – Buesser (Wilson, Bassett)
	0–3	33:50 – Vaillancourt (Wilson, Brine)
Parsons – 36:36	1–3
	1–4	45:20 – pp – Vaillancourt (Vaughn, Cahow)
	1–5	53:26 – pp – Brine (Vaillancourt)

14 min
Penalties
12 min
31
Shots
44

==== (4) Minnesota vs. Wisconsin ====
March 15; 7:00	Wisconsin	3–2 OT (1–1, 0–1, 1–0) (OT: 1–0)	Minnesota	Ridder Arena; Attendance: 1,458

Jessie Vetter
Goalies
Jenny Lura
Referee:
Dan Lick
Linesmen:
Ron Storey
Michael Elam

Nash (Hagen, Jakiel) – 8:19	1–0
	1–1	16:56 – pp – Marvin (Ross, Miller)
	1–2	39:59 – West (Marvin, Francis)
Knight (Matthews, Windmeier) – 40:14	2–2
Deluce (Zaugg, Duggan) – 61:29	3–2

4 min
Penalties
4 min
26
Shots
23

==== (2) Minnesota Duluth vs. Mercyhurst ====
March 15	Mercyhurst	4–5 (2–1, 0–1, 2–3)	Minnesota Duluth	DECC Arena

Laura Hosier
Goalies
Kim Martin

Agosta (Prough) – 0:22	1–0
	1–1	0:48 – Fridfinnson (Blais, Irwin)
Chouinard (Payne, Scanzano) – pp – 18:37	2–1
	2–2	35:44 – sh – Demeule
Payne (Agosta, Prough) – 43:00	3–2
	3–3	48:00 – pp – Fridfinnson (Pelttari, Irwin)
	3–4	50:00 – pp – Blais (Pelttari, Irwin)
	3–5	56:53 – Blais (Trépanier, Irwin)
Bendus (Chouinard)	4–5

10 min
Penalties
10 min
28
Shots
33

==== (3) New Hampshire vs. St. Lawrence ====
March 15; 1:00	St. Lawrence	2–3 (OT) (1–0, 1–1, 0–1) (OT: 0–1)	New Hampshire	Whittemore Center; Attendance: 1,607

Meaghan Guckian
Goalies
Kayley Herman
Referee:
Patrick Silva
Linesmen:
Paul Driscoll
Robert Tisi, Jr.

Duggan (Harbec, Grills) – 4:39	1–0
	1–1	26:28 – Birchard (Bellamy, Hitchcock)
Harbec (Duggan) – 29:36	2–1
	2–2	53:28 – Wakefield (Bellamy, Paton)
	2–3	62:40 – Wright-Ward (Hitchcock)

4 min
Penalties
10 min
22
Shots
33

=== National Semifinals ===
==== (1) Harvard vs. Wisconsin ====
March 20; 5:07 pm	Wisconsin	4–1 (0–1, 3–0, 1–0)	Harvard	DECC Arena; Attendance: 3,023

Jessie Vetter
Goalies
Christina Kessler
Referee:
Patrick Silva
Linesmen:
Micheal Elam
Tina Simonson

	0–1	4:42 – pp – Brine (Vaughn, Cahow)
Lawler – 20:18	1–1
Giles (Hanson, Duggan) – 22:25	2–1
Zaugg (Lawler, Morris) – 26:56	3–1
Zaugg (Duggan, Deluce) – 43:15	4–1

8 min
Penalties
4 min
28
Shots
34

==== (2) Minnesota Duluth vs. (3) New Hampshire ====
v

=== National Championship ===
==== Wisconsin vs. (2) Minnesota Duluth ====
March 22; 12:30 pm	Wisconsin	0–4 (0–1, 0–2, 0–1)	Minnesota Duluth	DECC Arena; Attendance: 4,031

Jessie Vetter
Goalies
Kim Martin
Referee:
Scott Leavitt
Linesmen:
Ray Doocy
Ron Storey

0–1	19:22 – Irwin (O'Toole, Larocque)
0–2	31:48 – pp – Blais (Fridfinnson, Rasmussen)
0–3	38:24 – sh – O'Toole
0–4	57:15 – Demeule (Mattila, Trépanier)

14 min
Penalties
22 min
28
Shots
24

== Tournament awards ==
=== All-Tournament Team ===
- G: Kim Martin*, Minnesota Duluth
- D: Myriam Trépanier, Minnesota Duluth
- D: Heidi Pelttari, Minnesota Duluth
- F: Laura Fridfinnson, Minnesota Duluth
- F: Sara O’Toole, Minnesota Duluth
- F: Erika Lawler, Wisconsin

* Most Outstanding Player
