= 2002 NCAA National Collegiate women's ice hockey tournament =

NCAA women's ice hockey postseason tournament

- 2002 Frozen Four logo
- Teams: 4
- Finals site: Whittemore Center, Durham, New Hampshire
- Champions: Minnesota Duluth Bulldogs (2nd title)
- Runner-up: Brown Bears (1st title game)
- Semifinalists: Minnesota Golden Gophers (1st Frozen Four); Niagara Purple Eagles (1st Frozen Four)
- Winning coach: Shannon Miller (2nd title)
- MOP: Kristy Zamora (Brown)
- Attendance: 5153, 3,102 for Championship Game

The 2002 NCAA National Collegiate Women's Ice Hockey Tournament involved four schools playing in single-elimination play to determine the national champion of women's NCAA Division I college ice hockey. The tournament began on March 22, 2002, and ended with the championship game on March 24. The Minnesota Duluth Bulldogs defeated the Brown Bears 3–2 for their second straight national championship.

== Qualifying teams ==
2002 Qualifying Teams
WCHA, ECAC

The at-large bids, along with the seeding for each team in the tournament, were announced on Sunday, March 17.

Seed	School	Conference	Record	Berth Type	Appearance	Last bid
W1	Minnesota	WCHA	28–3–5	Tournament champion	1st	Never
W2	Minnesota Duluth	WCHA	22–6–4	At-large bid	2nd	2001
E1	Niagara	ECAC	26–7–1	At-large bid	1st	Never
E2	Brown	ECAC	24–7–2	Tournament champion	1st	Never

== Brackets ==
=== Frozen Four – Durham, New Hampshire ===
National Semifinals; March 22
E2	Brown	2
W1	Minnesota	1
W2	Minnesota Duluth	3
E1	Niagara	2

National Championship; March 24
E2	Brown	2
W2	Minnesota Duluth	3
Consolation Game
W1	Minnesota	2
E1	Niagara	2

== Tournament awards ==
=== All-Tournament Team ===
- G: Tania Pinelli, Niagara
- D: Larissa Luther, Minnesota Duluth
- D: Meredith Ostrander, Brown
- F: Kelly Stephens, Minnesota
- F: Joanne Eustace, Minnesota Duluth
- F: Kristy Zamora*, Brown

* Most Outstanding Player
