= 2010 NCAA National Collegiate women's ice hockey tournament =

NCAA women's ice hockey postseason tournament

- Teams: 8
- Finals site: Ridder Arena, Minneapolis, Minnesota
- Champions: Minnesota Duluth Bulldogs (5th title)
- Runner-up: Cornell Big Red (1st title game)
- Semifinalists: Minnesota Golden Gophers (7th Frozen Four); Mercyhurst Lakers (2nd Frozen Four)
- Winning coach: Shannon Miller (5th title)
- MOP: Emmanuelle Blais (Minnesota Duluth)
- Attendance: 1,473 for Championship Game

The 2010 NCAA National Collegiate Women's Ice Hockey Tournament involved eight schools in single-elimination play to determine the national champion of women's NCAA Division I college ice hockey. The quarterfinals were held at the home sites of the seeded teams and the Frozen Four was hosted by the University of Minnesota at Ridder Arena in Minneapolis, Minnesota. Cornell, Clarkson, and Boston University each reached the NCAA tournament for the first time in program history. The Minnesota Duluth Bulldogs defeated the Cornell Big Red 3–2 in triple overtime for their fifth national championship. It was the first NCAA women's hockey tournament final to go to overtime since 2003 and it is the only one as of 2026 to go to triple overtime.

== Qualifying teams ==
2010 Qualifying Teams
WCHA, ECAC, Hockey East, CHA

The winners of the ECAC, WCHA, and Hockey East tournaments all received automatic berths to the NCAA tournament. The other five teams were selected at-large. The top four teams were then seeded and received home ice for the quarterfinals.

Seed	School	Conference	Record	Berth type	Appearance	Last bid
1	Mercyhurst	CHA	29–2–3	At-large bid	6th	2009
2	Minnesota Duluth	WCHA	28–8–2	Tournament champion	9th	2009
3	Minnesota	WCHA	25–8–5	At-large bid	8th	2009
4	Harvard	ECAC	20–7–5	At-large bid	8th	2008
	Cornell	ECAC	19–8–6	Tournament champion	1st	Never
	Clarkson	ECAC	23–11–5	At-large bid	1st	Never
	New Hampshire	Hockey East	19–8–5	At-large bid	5th	2009
	Boston University	Hockey East	16–9–12	Tournament champion	1st	Never

== Bracket ==
Quarterfinals held at home sites of seeded teams

National Quarterfinals; March 12 – 13
1	Mercyhurst	4
Boston University	1
4	Harvard	2
Cornell	6
2	Minnesota Duluth	2
New Hampshire	1
3	Minnesota	3*
Clarkson	2

National Semifinals; March 19
1	Mercyhurst	2
Cornell	3*
2	Minnesota Duluth	3
3	Minnesota	2

National Championship; March 21
Cornell	2
2	Minnesota Duluth	3***

Note: * denotes overtime period(s)

Source.

== Results ==
=== National Quarterfinals ===
==== (1) Mercyhurst vs. Boston University ====
March 13	Boston University	1–4 (0–2, 0–0, 1–2)	Mercyhurst	Mercyhurst Ice Center; Attendance: 1,300

Game reference

Melissa Haber
Goalies
Hillary Pattenden

	0–1	14:26 – pp – Schols (Scanzano)
	0–2	16:36 – pp – Bram (Scanzano, Bendus)
	0–3	42:53 – Bendus (Jones)
Watchorn – pp – 53:38	1–3
	1–4	53:48 – Bram (Scanzano, Cockell)

10 min
Penalties
12 min
18
Shots
33

==== (4) Harvard vs. Cornell ====
March 12; 7:00	Cornell	6–2 (2–0, 4–1, 0–1)	Harvard	Bright Hockey Center; Attendance: 870

Game reference

Amanda Mazzotta
Goalies
Laura Bellamy
Kylie Stephens
Referees:
Bill Doiron
Julie Piacentini
Linesmen:
Shane Belanger
Chris Leavitt

White (Young) – 2:34	1–0
Overguard – sh – 6:26	2–0
Fortino (Karpenko) – 26:42	3–0
Jue (Danforth, Ogilvie) – 28:06	4–0
Karpenko (Rougeau) – pp – 29:45	5–0
	5–1	33:47 – pp – Griffin (Buesser, Fami)
Ogilvie (Karpenko) – 35:31	6–1
	6–2	53:11 – Coskren (Bassett)

8 min
Penalties
6 min
18
Shots
36

==== (2) Minnesota Duluth vs. New Hampshire ====
March 12	New Hampshire	1–2 (1–1, 0–0, 0–1)	Minnesota Duluth	DECC Arena

Game reference

Kayley Herman
Goalies
Jennifer Harss

	0–1	2:42 – Larocque (Ambroz)
Long (Brock) – 5:42	1–1
	1–2	43:57 – pp – Wong (Blais)

24
Shots
26

==== (3) Minnesota vs. Clarkson ====
March 13; 4:07	Clarkson	2–3 (OT) (0–1, 0–1, 2–0, 0–1)	Minnesota	Ridder Arena; Attendance: 785

Game reference

Lauren Dahm
Goalies
Noora Räty
Referees:
Ray Doocy
Michael Elam
Linesmen:
Dan Fitzsimmons
Alicia Hanrahan

	0–1	14:19 – pp – Francis (West, Bozek)
	0–2	17:36 – West (Erickson)
49:51 – Waldie (Selina, Eusepi)	1–2
58:16 – Baribeau (Boudreau)	2–2
	2–3	63:09 – West

10 min
Penalties
12 min
39
Shots
35

=== National Semifinals ===
==== (1) Mercyhurst vs. Cornell ====
March 19; 5:04	Cornell	3–2 (OT) (1–0, 0–2, 1–0, 1–0)	Mercyhurst	Ridder Arena

Game reference

Amanda Mazzotta
Goalies
Hillary Pattenden
Referees:
Ray Doocy
Mike Elam
Linesmen:
Kristine Langley
Tai Thorsheim

Fortino (K. Overguard, Rougeau) – sh – 6:30	1–0
	1–1	28:43 – Rossler
	1–2	30:38 – Corbett (Rossler, Jones)
K. Overguard (Martino, Jue) – 47:06	2–2
White (A. Overguard)	3–2

10 min
Penalties
12 min
30
Shots
30

==== (2) Minnesota Duluth vs. Minnesota ====
March 19; 8:38	Minnesota	2–3 (0–1, 1–2, 1–0)	Minnesota Duluth	Ridder Arena; Attendance: 2,070

Game reference

Noora Räty
Goalies
Jennifer Harss
Referees:
Dan Lick
Robert Ludwig
Linesmen:
Dan Fitzsimmons
Alicia Hanrahan

	0–1	5:55 – Fridfinnson (Blais)
	0–2	32:55 – Blais (Fridfinnson, Larocque)
Erickson (West) – 37:30	1–2
	1–3	39:15 – Blais (Fridfinnson)
West (Francis, Schleper) – 59:05	2–3

12 min
Penalties
8 min
29
Shots
24

=== National Championship ===
==== Cornell vs. (2) Minnesota Duluth ====
March 21; 12:05	Cornell	2–3 (3OT) (0–0, 1–0, 1–2, 0–0, 0–0, 0–1)	Minnesota Duluth	Ridder Arena; Attendance: 1,473

Game reference

Amanda Mazzotta
Goalies
Jennifer Harss
Referees:
Derek Zuckerman
Dan Lick
Linesmen:
Alicia Hanrahan
Kristine Langley

Jue (Rougeau, Fortino) – pp – 33:44	1–0
	1–1	40:18 – pp – Blais (Tuominen, Rasmussen)
	1–2	54:42 – pp – Rasmussen (Tuominen, Cournoyer)
Jue (Fortino, Overguard) – 56:30	2–2
	2–3	119:26 – Wong (Gray, Posa)

18 min
Penalties
12 min
51
Shots
64

== Tournament notes ==
Saara Tuominen and Jaime Rasmussen of Minnesota Duluth were the only players to score two points in the championship game.

Two records were set in the championship game: at four hours and twenty-four minutes, the game set an NCAA Frozen Four record for longest game, and Cornell goaltender Amanda Mazzotta set a record for most saves in an NCAA Championship game with 61 saves. The former record holder was Bulldog goaltender Patricia Sautter, who set the previous record in 2003 with 41 saves.

== Tournament awards ==
=== All-Tournament Team ===
- G Amanda Mazzotta, Cornell
- D Laura Fortino, Cornell
- D Lauriane Rougeau, Cornell
- F Emmanuelle Blais*, Minnesota Duluth
- F Jessica Wong, Minnesota Duluth
- F Laura Fridfinnson, Minnesota Duluth

* Most Outstanding Player
