= 2013 NCAA National Collegiate women's ice hockey tournament =

NCAA women's ice hockey postseason tournament

- Teams: 8
- Finals site: Ridder Arena, Minneapolis, Minnesota
- Champions: Minnesota Golden Gophers (4th title)
- Runner-up: Boston University Terriers (2nd title game)
- Semifinalists: Boston College Eagles (4th Frozen Four); Mercyhurst Lakers (3rd Frozen Four)
- Winning coach: Brad Frost (2nd title)
- MOP: Noora Räty (Minnesota)
- Attendance: 16,739, 3,400 for Championship Game

The 2013 NCAA National Collegiate women's ice hockey tournament involved eight schools in single-elimination play that determined the national champion of women's NCAA Division I college ice hockey. Regional quarterfinals were contested on March 15 and 16, 2013. The Frozen Four was played on March 22 and 24, 2013 at Ridder Arena in Minneapolis, with the University of Minnesota as the host school.

The University of Minnesota won the title with a 6–3 win over Boston University, becoming the first NCAA women's hockey team ever to complete a perfect season (41–0–0).

== Qualifying teams ==
2013 Qualifying Teams
WCHA, ECAC, Hockey East, CHA

The winners of the ECAC, WCHA, and Hockey East tournaments all received automatic berths to the NCAA tournament. The other five teams were selected at-large. The top four teams were then seeded and received home ice for the quarterfinals.

Seed	School	Conference	Record	Berth type	Appearance	Last bid
1	Minnesota	WCHA	38–0–0	Tournament champion	11th	2012
2	Cornell	ECAC	27–6–1	Tournament champion	4th	2012
3	Boston University	Hockey East	28–6–3	Tournament champion	4th	2012
4	Boston College	Hockey East	27–7–3	At-large bid	5th	2012
	North Dakota	WCHA	26–12–1	At-large bid	2nd	2012
	Harvard	ECAC	24–7–3	At-large bid	9th	2010
	Mercyhurst	CHA	29–7–1	At-large bid	9th	2012
	Clarkson	ECAC	28–9–0	At-large bid	2nd	2010

== Bracket ==
Quarterfinals held at home sites of seeded teams

National Quarterfinals; March 10
1	Minnesota	3***
North Dakota	2
4	Boston College	3
Harvard	1
2	Cornell	3
Mercyhurst	4*
3	Boston University	5
Clarkson	3

National Semifinals; March 16
1	Minnesota	3*
4	Boston College	2
Mercyhurst	1
3	Boston University	4

National Championship; March 18
1	Minnesota	6
3	Boston University	3

Note: * denotes overtime period(s)

== Results ==
=== National Quarterfinals ===
==== (1) Minnesota vs. North Dakota ====
March 16; 4:00	North Dakota	2–3 (3OT) (1–1, 1–1, 0–0, 0–0, 0–0, 0–1)	Minnesota	Ridder Arena; Attendance: 2,750

Game reference

Shelby Amsley-Benzie
Goalies
Noora Räty
Referees:
Kristine Langley
Leah Wrazidlo
Linesmen:
Kevin Capocasa
Shane Pasky

	0–1	0:52 – Brandt (Kessel, Brausen)
Furia (Dufault) – 14:05	1–1
Dufault (Karvinen, Jakobsen) – pp – 20:29	2–1
	2–2	36:00 – pp – Kessel (Bozek)
	2–3	118:51 – pp – Terry (Bona, Jalosuo)

14 min
Penalties
17 min
52
Shots
60

==== (4) Boston College vs. Harvard ====
March 16; 1:00	Harvard	1–3 (1–1, 0–2, 0–0)	Boston College	Conte Forum; Attendance: 920

Game reference

Emerance Maschmeyer
Goalies
Corinne Boyles
Referee:
Ryan Hicks
Linesmen:
Cam Lynch
Will Harrop

Parker (Spurling, Reber) – pp – 16:00	1–0
	1–1	17:00 – Skarupa (Bolden)
	1–2	22:11 – Walsh (Burns, Motherwell)
	1–3	35:04 – Carpenter (Bolden)

4 min
Penalties
8 min
31
Shots
24

==== (2) Cornell vs. Mercyhurst ====
March 16; 1:00	Mercyhurst	4–3 (OT) (1–0, 0–2, 2–1, 1–0)	Cornell	Lynah Rink; Attendance: 2,327

Game reference

Stephanie Ciampa
Goalies
Lauren Slebodnick
Referees:
Katie Guay
Pat Silva
Linesmen:
Bridget Waitkus
Bob Sloper

Buquet (Hendrikx, Bestland) – 8:34	1–0
	1–1	32:29 – pp – Jenner (Fortino, Rougeau)
	1–2	39:00 – Brown (Jenner)
DeSutter (Dingeldein, Bestland) – 47:29	2–2
Luczak (Welch) – 58:47	3–2
	3–3	59:04 – Saulnier (Jenner)
Dingeldein (Kilroy, Janiga) – 64:49	4–3

14 min
Penalties
16 min
34
Shots
32

==== (3) Boston University vs. Clarkson ====
March 16; 3:00	Clarkson	3–5 (0–1, 1–1, 2–3)	Boston University	Walter Brown Arena; Attendance: 542

Game reference

Erica Howe
Goalies
Kerrin Sperry
Referee:
Dina Allen
Linesmen:
Derek Zuckerman
Peter Terreri

	0–1	4:49 – Poulin (Kohanchuk, Doyle)
Ambrose (Nisbet, Mercer) – 21:44	1–1
	1–2	37:09 – Kohanchuk (Poulin, Fratkin)
	1–3	49:22 – Lefort
	1–4	49:48 – Warren (Menard, Tutino)
Lambert (Rattray) – 50:00	2–4
MacAulay (Skirrow, Shields) – 55:20	3–4
	3–5	59:01 – Lefort

4 min
Penalties
10 min
37
Shots
27

=== National Semifinals ===
==== (1) Minnesota vs. (4) Boston College ====
March 22; 5:00	Boston College	2–3 (OT) (0–0, 1–0, 1–2, 0–1)	Minnesota	Ridder Arena; Attendance: 3,400

Game reference

Corinne Boyles
Goalies
Noora Räty
Referees:
Bryan Hicks
Cam Lynch
Linesmen:
Will Harrop
Jamie Colacino

Field (Carpenter, Skarupa) – pp – 38:13	1–0
	1–1	41:42 – pp – Brandt (Bozek, McMillen)
	1–2	52:12 – Kortum (Bona, McMillen)
Bender (Skarupa, Trivigno) – 54:12	2–2
	2–3	61:39 – Davis (Brausen, Lorence)

6 min
Penalties
6 min
28
Shots
39

==== Mercyhurst vs. (3) Boston University ====
March 22; 8:17	Mercyhurst	1–4 (0–1, 0–1, 1–2)	Boston University	Ridder Arena; Attendance: 3,400

Game reference

Stephanie Ciampa
Goalies
Kerrin Sperry
Referee:
Leah Wrazidlo
Linesmen:
Krissy Langley
Kevin Capocasa

	0–1	0:13 – Kohanchuk Poulin, Fratkin)
	0–2	21:00 – Menard (Warren)
	0–3	43:02 – Miller (Kohanchuk)
	0–4	49:57 – Poulin
Cicero (Bestland, Higson) – 58:07	1–4

10 min
Penalties
15 min
27
Shots
33

=== National Championship ===
==== (1) Minnesota vs. (3) Boston University ====
March 24; 3:04	Boston University	3–6 (1–2, 0–2, 2–2)	Minnesota	Ridder Arena; Attendance: 3,400

Game reference

Kerrin Sperry
Goalies
Noora Räty
Referees:
Bryan Hicks
Cam Lynch
Linesmen:
Will Harrop
Jamie Colacino

	0–1	11:38 – pp – Jalosuo (Ramsey, Davis)
	0–2	18:32 – sh – Brandt (Kessel, Gillanders)
Lefort (Stoneburgh, Poulin) – pp – 18:48	1–2
	1–3	36:02 – Kessel (Menefee, Ramsey)
	1–4	39:48 – pp – McMillen (Menefee, Bozek)
Poulin (Doyle, Cardella) – pp – 41:48	2–4
	2–5	55:27 – Ramsey (Menefee, Kessel)
Kohanchuk (Fratkin, Miller) – 57:08	3–5
	3–6	59:11 – en – Kessel

8 min
Penalties
8 min
24
Shots
29

== Tournament awards ==
=== All-Tournament Team ===
- G Noora Raty*, Minnesota
- F Marie-Philip Poulin, Boston University
- F Amanda Kessel, Minnesota
- F Hannah Brandt, Minnesota
- D Milica McMillen, Minnesota
- D Megan Bozek, Minnesota

* Most Outstanding Player

== See also ==
- 2013 NCAA Division I Men's Ice Hockey Tournament
