= 2009 NCAA National Collegiate women's ice hockey tournament =

NCAA women's ice hockey postseason tournament

- Teams: 8
- Finals site: Agganis Arena, Boston
- Champions: Wisconsin Badgers (3rd title)
- Runner-up: Mercyhurst Lakers (1st title game)
- Semifinalists: Minnesota Duluth Bulldogs (6th Frozen Four); Minnesota Golden Gophers (6th Frozen Four)
- Winning coach: Mark Johnson (3rd title)
- MOP: Jessie Vetter (Wisconsin)
- Attendance: 15,006, 2,437 for Championship Game

The 2009 NCAA National Collegiate Women's Ice Hockey Tournament involved eight schools playing in single-elimination play to determine the national champion of women's NCAA Division I college ice hockey. It began on March 14, 2009, and ended with the championship game on March 22. The quarterfinals were played at the home sites of the seeded teams and the Frozen Four was played in Boston. The Wisconsin Badgers defeated the Mercyhurst Lakers 5–0 to win their third national championship, of which occurred in the past four seasons. Jessie Vetter was named Most Outstanding Player for the second time in her career to become the first player to win the award multiple times.

== Qualifying teams ==
2009 Qualifying Teams
WCHA, ECAC, Hockey East, CHA

The winners of the ECAC, WCHA, and Hockey East tournaments all received automatic berths to the NCAA tournament. The other five teams were selected at-large. The top four teams were then seeded and received home ice for the quarterfinals.

Seed	School	Conference	Record	Berth type	Appearance	Last bid
1	Wisconsin	WCHA	18–2–5	Tournament champion	5th	2008
2	Minnesota	WCHA	22–1–3	At-large bid	7th	2008
3	Mercyhurst	CHA	29–5–0	At-large bid	5th	2008
4	New Hampshire	Hockey East	24–5–5	Tournament champion	4th	2008
	Minnesota Duluth	WCHA	17–5–4	At-large bid	8th	2008
	St. Lawrence	ECAC	24–10–3	At-large bid	6th	2008
	Boston College	Hockey East	22–8–5	At-large bid	2nd	2007
	Dartmouth	ECAC	20–9–4	Tournament champion	7th	2008

== Bracket ==
National Quarterfinals; March 14
1	Wisconsin	7
Dartmouth	0
4	New Hampshire	1
Minnesota Duluth	4
2	Minnesota	4
Boston College	3
3	Mercyhurst	3
St. Lawrence	1

National Semifinals; March 20
1	Wisconsin	5
Minnesota Duluth	1
2	Minnesota	4
3	Mercyhurst	5

National Championship; March 22
1	Wisconsin	5
3	Mercyhurst	0

Note: * denotes overtime period(s)

== Results ==
=== National Quarterfinals ===
==== (1) Wisconsin vs. Dartmouth ====
March 14; 1:07	Dartmouth	0–7 (0–2, 0–3, 0–2)	Wisconsin	Kohl Center; Attendance: 3,023

Game reference

Carli Clemis
Goalies
Jessie Vetter
Referees:
Chris Perrault
Dan Lick
Linesmen:
Christine Langley
Tai Thorsheim

0–1	3:39 – pp – Keseley (Lawler, Knight)
0–2	11:25 – Lawler (Knight)
0–3	29:36 – Knight (Keseley, Dronen)
0–4	32:13 – sh – Knight
0–5	36:34 – pp – Keseley (Duggan, Knight)
0–6	56:09 – Keseley (Knight, Lawler)
0–7	59:01 – Ammerman (Keseley, Dronen)

10 min
Penalties
10 min
32
Shots
28

==== (4) New Hampshire vs. Minnesota Duluth ====
March 14; 1:00	Minnesota Duluth	4–1 (0–0, 0–0, 4–1)	New Hampshire	Whittemore Center; Attendance: 1,410

Game reference

Kayley Herman
Goalies
Johanna Ellison
Referees:
Derek Zuckerman
Dean Gilbert
Linesmen:
Gary Young
Katie Guay

Irwin (O'Toole) – pp – 42:49	1–0
Holmlöv (Winberg) – 50:08	2–0
	2–1	11:59 – pp – Birchard (Faber)
Mattilia (Blais, Pelttari) – 57:43	3–1
O'Toole (Larocque, Winberg) – en – 59:49	4–1

10 min
Penalties
40 min
25
Shots
22

==== (2) Minnesota vs. Boston College ====
March 14; 4:00	Boston College	3–4 (1–4, 1–0, 1–0)	Minnesota	Ridder Arena; Attendance: 1,530

Game reference

Molly Schaus
Goalies
Alyssa Grogan
Referees:
Jay Mendel
Robert Ludwig
Linesmen:
Alicia Hanrahan
Erin Blair

	0–1	0:46 – pp – Marvin (Gagnon, Grogan)
	0–2	3:15 – Marvin (Francis, West)
Restuccia (Thunstrom) – 4:35	1–2
	1–3	8:17 – Drazan
	1–4	8:59 – Francis (Gagnon, Lamoureux)
Restuccia (Stack, Schaus) – pp – 34:00	2–4
Fardelmann (Stack, Taverna) – pp – 45:28	3–4

10 min
Penalties
25 min
28
Shots
32

==== (3) Mercyhurst vs. St. Lawrence ====
March 14; 3:00	St. Lawrence	1–3 (1–0, 0–2, 0–1)	Mercyhurst	Mercyhurst Ice Center; Attendance: 1,194

Game reference

Brittony Chartier
Goalies
Hillary Pattenden

Batchelor (Emond, Roach) – 3:43	1–0
	1–1	22:15 – Steadman (Bendus, Bram)
	1–2	34:35 – pp – Agosta (Prough, Chouinard)
	1–3	43:35 – Jones

10 min
Penalties
6 min
13
Shots
44

=== National Semifinals ===
==== (1) Wisconsin vs. Minnesota Duluth ====
March 20; 5:04	Minnesota Duluth	1–5 (0–0, 0–3, 1–2)	Wisconsin	Agganis Arena; Attendance: 2,706

Game reference

Johanna Ellison
Goalies
Jessie Vetter
Referees:
Lick/Perrault
Alicia Hanrahan
Linesman:
Erin Blair

	0–1	31:16 – pp – Lawler (Knight, Matthews)
	0–2	32:33 – pp – Knight (Duggan)
	0–3	36:36 – pp – Lawler (Knight, Duggan)
	0–4	45:26 – Sanders (Ammerman)
	0–5	54:25 – pp – Knight (Duggan)
Rasmussen (Fridfinnson) – 55:08	1–5

29 min
Penalties
10 min
29
Shots
32

==== (2) Minnesota vs. (3) Mercyhurst ====
March 20; 8:05	Mercyhurst	5–4 (3–1, 2–0, 0–3)	Minnesota	Agganis Arena; Attendance: 2,706

Game reference

Hillary Pattenden
Goalies
Alyssa Grogan
Jenny Lura
Referees:
Gilbert/Zuckerman
Todd Aldous
Linesman:
Larry Legault

	0–1	5:29 – pp – Marvin (Drazan)
Chouinard (McMeekin, Scanzano) – pp – 8:38	1–1
Bram – pp – 15:47	2–1
Agosta (Jones, Scanzano) – 18:46	3–1
Corbett (Chouinard, Cockell) – 23:40	4–1
Agosta (Scanzano) – 39:55	5–1
	5–2	51:13 – pp – Schoullis (Marvin)
	5–3	55:24 – Marvin
	5–4	58:43 – pp – Lamoureux (Drazan, Marvin)

16 min
Penalties
16 min
22
Shots
37

=== National Championship ===
==== (1) Wisconsin vs. (3) Mercyhurst ====
March 22; 12:04	Mercyhurst	0–5 (0–0, 0–3, 0–2)	Wisconsin	Agganis Arena; Attendance: 2,437

Game reference

Hillary Pattenden
Goalies
Jessie Vetter
Referees:
Zuckerman/Gilbert
Todd Aldous
Linesman:
Larry Legault

0–1	25:28 – Ammerman (Keseley)
0–2	28:48 – pp – Duggan (Matthews, Lawler)
0–3	30:38 – Keseley (Lawler, Knight)
0–4	43:26 – Windmeier (Giles, Duggan)
0–5	45:38 – Knight (Lawler, Keseley)

12 min
Penalties
26 min
37
Shots
32

== Tournament awards ==
=== All-Tournament Team ===
- G: Jessie Vetter*, Wisconsin
- D: Alycia Matthews, Wisconsin
- D: Malee Windmeier, Wisconsin
- F: Meghan Agosta, Mercyhurst
- F: Hilary Knight, Wisconsin

* Most Outstanding Player
