= 2014 NCAA National Collegiate women's ice hockey tournament =

- 2014 Women's Frozen Four logo
- Teams: 8
- Finals site: TD Bank Sports Center, Hamden, Connecticut
- Champions: Clarkson Golden Knights (1st title)
- Runner-up: Minnesota Golden Gophers (6th title game)
- Semifinalists: Wisconsin Badgers (7th Frozen Four); Mercyhurst Lakers (4th Frozen Four)
- Winning coach: Shannon Desrosiers and Matt Desrosiers (1st title)
- MOP: Jamie Lee Rattray (Clarkson)
- Attendance: 6,744, 3,573 for Championship Game

The 2014 NCAA National Collegiate Women's Ice Hockey Tournament involved eight schools in single-elimination play to determine the national champion of women's NCAA Division I college ice hockey. The quarterfinals were contested at the campuses of the seeded teams on March 15, 2014. The Frozen Four was played on March 21 and 23, 2014 at TD Bank Sports Center in Hamden, Connecticut, with Quinnipiac University as the host.

Clarkson University defeated the University of Minnesota 5–4 in the national championship game, in the process becoming the fourth school to have won a National Collegiate championship. This championship was the first by a team not from the WCHA as well as the first by a team from the Eastern United States. It also proved to be the final game for Clarkson's co-head coach Shannon Desrosiers, who had finished her sixth season sharing head coaching duties with her husband Matt. About a month after the championship game, Shannon stepped down, leaving Matt in sole charge. Shannon cited a wish to spend more time raising the couple's young daughter and soon-to-be-born second child.

== Qualifying teams ==
2014 Qualifying Teams
WCHA, ECAC, Hockey East, CHA

The winners of the ECAC, WCHA, and Hockey East tournaments all received automatic berths to the NCAA tournament. The other five teams were selected at-large. The top four teams were then seeded and received home ice for the quarterfinals.

Seed	School	Conference	Record	Berth type	Appearance	Last bid
1	Minnesota	WCHA	36–1–1	Tournament champion	12th	2013
2	Cornell	ECAC	24–5–4	Tournament champion	5th	2013
3	Clarkson	ECAC	28–5–5	At-large bid	3rd	2013
4	Wisconsin	WCHA	27–7–2	At-large bid	8th	2012
	Harvard	ECAC	23–6–4	At-large bid	10th	2013
	Boston College	Hockey East	27–6–3	At-large bid	5th	2013
	Mercyhurst	CHA	23–8–4	At-large bid	10th	2013
	Boston University	Hockey East	24–12–1	Tournament champion	5th	2013

== Bracket ==
Quarterfinals held at home sites of seeded teams

National Quarterfinals; March 15
1	Minnesota	5
Boston University	1
4	Wisconsin	2
Harvard	1
2	Cornell	2
Mercyhurst	3
3	Clarkson	3
Boston College	1

National Semifinals; March 21
1	Minnesota	5
4	Wisconsin	3
Mercyhurst	1
3	Clarkson	5

National Championship; March 23
1	Minnesota	4
3	Clarkson	5

Note: * denotes overtime period(s)

== Results ==
=== National Quarterfinals ===
==== (1) Minnesota vs. Boston University ====
March 15; 4:07	Boston University	1–5 (1–1, 0–1, 0–3)	Minnesota	Ridder Arena; Attendance: 2,606

Game reference

Kerrin Sperry
Goalies
Amanda Leveille
Referees:
David Lick
David Spivey
Linesmen:
Joe Oberg
Mike Diebole

	0–1	12:56 – Terry (McMillen)
Lefort (Braga) – 13:17	1–1
	1–2	28:01 – pp – Ramsey (McMillen, Terry)
	1–3	42:46 – Terry (Ramsey)
	1–4	47:56 – Terry (Ramsey)
	1–5	52:51 – Menefee (Brandt)

10 min
Penalties
8 min
29
Shots
46

==== (4) Wisconsin vs. Harvard ====
March 15; 7:07	Harvard	1–2 (0–1, 0–1, 1–0)	Wisconsin	LaBahn Arena; Attendance: 2,273

Game reference

Emerance Maschmeyer
Goalies
Alex Rigsby
Referees:
Leah Wrazidlo
Krissy Langley
Linesmen:
Casey Enge
Dan Fitzsimons

	0–1	16:56 – Turnbull (Ammerman, Channell)
	0–2	36:24 Josephs (Jaminski, Turnbull)
Crugnale (D'Oench) – 56:37	1–2

8 min
Penalties
2 min
24
Shots
44

==== (2) Cornell vs. Mercyhurst ====
March 15; 3:00	Mercyhurst	3–2 (0–1, 2–0, 1–1)	Cornell	Lynah Rink; Attendance: 1,646

Game reference

Amanda Makela
Goalies
Lauren Slebodnick
Referees:
Tim Quinn
Chris Leavitt
Linesmen:
Tim Daley
Bob Sloper

	0–1	7:39 – pp – Fulton (Saulnier, Gagliardi)
Byrne (Bestland, Chippy) – pp – 30:59	1–1
Bestland (Janiga) – 34:42	2–1
Bestland (Dingeldein, Cicero) – pp – 48:08	3–1
	3–2	55:31 – Fulton (Poudrier, Slebodnick)

8 min
Penalties
12 min
37
Shots
31

==== (3) Clarkson vs. Boston College ====
March 15; 4:00	Boston College	1–3 (0–1, 0–1, 1–1)	Clarkson	Cheel Arena; Attendance: 640

Game reference

Corinne Boyles
Goalies
Erica Howe
Referee:
Dina Allen
Linesmen:
Bryan Hicks
Peter Terreri

	0–1	16:02 – Gagnon (Rattray, Fast)
	0–2	31:44 – Styner (Plante, Rattray)
	0–3	40:23 – Gagnon (Styner, Rattray)
Trivigno (Capizzano, Field) – pp – 56:15	1–3

10 min
Penalties
6 min
24
Shots
32

=== National Semifinals ===
==== (1) Minnesota vs. (4) Wisconsin ====
March 21; 5:04	Wisconsin	3–5 (1–0, 2–2, 0–3)	Minnesota	TD Bank Sports Center; Attendance: 3,171

Game reference

Alex Rigsby
Goalies
Amanda Leveille
Referees:
Leah Wrazidlo
Krissy Langley
Linesmen:
Mike Diebold
Joe Oberg

Ammerman – 18:38	1–0
	1–1	20:33 – Terry (Cameranesi, Brausen)
	1–2	22:12 – pp – Menefee (Terry)
Josephs (Zgraja) – 36:20	2–2
Sylvester (Packer) – 39:29	3–2
	3–3	45:37 – pp – Brandt (McMillen, Cameranesi)
	3–4	48:06 – Bona (Davis)
	3–5	57:32 – Gillanders (Brandt)

8 min
Penalties
4 min
37
Shots
28

==== Mercyhurst vs (3) Clarkson ====
March 21; 8:04	Mercyhurst	1–5 (1–0, 0–3, 0–2)	Clarkson	TD Bank Sports Center; Attendance: 3,171

Game reference

Amanda Makela
Goalies
Erica Howe
Referee:
Tom Quinn
Linesmen:
Chris Leavitt
Bob Sloper

Arbour (Bram) – 8:02	1–0
	1–1	25:00 – Fast (Gagnon)
	1–2	29:16 – Gagnon (Rattray)
	1–3	36:24 – Lambert (Fast, Nisbet)
	1–4	46:39 – Styner (Rattray)
	1–5	59:46 – MacAulay (Nisbet, O. Howe)

6 min
Penalties
6 min
19
Shots
35

=== National Championship ===
==== (1) Minnesota vs. (3) Clarkson ====
March 23; 3:00	Clarkson	5–4 (2–1, 1–2, 2–1)	Minnesota	TD Bank Sports Center; Attendance: 3,573

Game reference

Erica Howe
Goalies
Amanda Leveille
Referee:
Tom Quinn
Linesmen:
Chris Leavitt
Bob Sloper

	0–1	9:40 – Davis (Bona)
Lambert (MacAulay) – 18:37	1–1
Nisbet (Shields, Mercer) – 19:40	2–1
Rattray (MacAulay, Styner) – pp – 20:38	3–1
	3–2	26:09 – pp – Menefee (Cameranesi, Terry)
	3–3	27:57 – Bona (Wolfe, Schippper)
Plante (Gagnon, Rattray) – 51:32	4–3
MacAulay – 55:44	5–3
	5–4	56:19 – Gillanders (Terry)

10 min
Penalties
4 min
28
Shots
38

== Tournament awards ==
=== All-Tournament Team ===
- G: Erica Howe, Clarkson
- D: Baylee Gillanders, Minnesota
- D: Renata Fast, Clarkson
- F: Rachel Bona, Minnesota
- F: Maryanne Menefee, Minnesota
- F: Jamie Lee Rattray*, Clarkson

* Most Outstanding Player

== See also ==
- 2014 NCAA Division I Men's Ice Hockey Tournament
