= 2011 NCAA National Collegiate women's ice hockey tournament =

NCAA women's ice hockey postseason tournament

- Teams: 8
- Finals site: Tullio Arena, Erie, Pennsylvania
- Champions: Wisconsin Badgers (4th title)
- Runner-up: Boston University Terriers (1st title game)
- Semifinalists: Cornell Big Red (2nd Frozen Four); Boston College Eagles (2nd Frozen Four)
- Winning coach: Mark Johnson (4th title)
- MOP: (Tie) Meghan Duggan and Hilary Knight (Wisconsin Badgers)
- Attendance: 17,850, 3,965 for Championship Game

The 2011 NCAA National Collegiate Women's Ice Hockey Tournament involved eight schools in single-elimination play that determined the national champion of women's NCAA Division I college ice hockey. The Frozen Four was hosted by Mercyhurst College at Tullio Arena in Erie, Pennsylvania. The Wisconsin Badgers defeated the Boston University Terriers 4–1 for their fourth national championship. It was the first (and as of 2026, only) time that two players were named the Most Outstanding Player with Wisconsin's Meghan Duggan (two goals, three assists) and Hilary Knight (one goal, four assists) each receiving the honor.

== Qualifying teams ==
2011 Qualifying Teams
WCHA, ECAC, Hockey East, CHA

The winners of the ECAC, WCHA, and Hockey East tournaments all received automatic berths to the NCAA tournament. The other five teams were selected at-large. The top four teams were then seeded and received home ice for the quarterfinals.

| Seed | School | Conference | Record | Berth type | Appearance | Last bid |
|---|---|---|---|---|---|---|
| 1 | Wisconsin | WCHA | 34–2–2 | Tournament champion | 6th | 2009 |
| 2 | Cornell | ECAC | 30–2–1 | Tournament champion | 2nd | 2010 |
| 3 | Boston University | Hockey East | 25–6–4 | At-large bid | 2nd | 2010 |
| 4 | Boston College | Hockey East | 23–6–6 | Tournament champion | 3rd | 2009 |
| | Minnesota | WCHA | 26–9–2 | At-large bid | 9th | 2010 |
| | Mercyhurst | CHA | 29–5–0 | At-large bid | 7th | 2010 |
| | Dartmouth | ECAC | 22–11–0 | At-large bid | 8th | 2009 |
| | Minnesota Duluth | WCHA | 22–7–3 | At-large bid | 10th | 2010 |

== Bracket ==
Quarterfinals held at home sites of seeded teams

National Quarterfinals; March 12
1 | Wisconsin | 2
Minnesota–Duluth | 1
4 | Boston College | 4
Minnesota | 1
2 | Cornell | 7
Dartmouth | 1
3 | Boston University | 4
Mercyhurst | 2

National Semifinals; March 19
1 | Wisconsin | 3
4 | Boston College | 2
2 | Cornell | 1
3 | Boston University | 4

National Championship; March 20
1 | Wisconsin | 4
3 | Boston University | 1

Note: * denotes overtime period(s)

== Results ==
=== National Quarterfinals ===
==== (1) Wisconsin vs. Minnesota Duluth ====
| March 12 | Minnesota Duluth | 1–2 (1–0, 0–1, 0–1) | Wisconsin | Kohl Center; Attendance: 4,006 |

Game reference

Kim Martin
Goalies
Alex Rigsby

| Wong (Irwin, Fridfinnson) – 19:31 | 1–0 |
| | 1–1 | 3:06 – Knight (McKeough, Ammerman) |
| | 1–2 | 7:34 – Duggan (Knight, Decker) |

6 min
Penalties
6 min
30
Shots
40

==== (4) Boston College vs. Minnesota ====
| March 12; 1:00 | Minnesota | 1–4 (0–4, 1–0, 0–0) | Boston College | Conte Forum; Attendance: 583 |

Game reference

Noora Räty
Goalies
Molly Schaus

| | 0–1 | 0:24 – Motherwell (Kurth) |
| | 0–2 | 2:45 – Bizzari (Restuccia) |
| | 0–3 | 8:16 – Stack (Motherwell, Bolden) |
| | 0–4 | 13:50 – Stack (Motherwell, Welch) |
| Erickson (Kessel, Bozek) – pp – 51:45 | 1–4 |

8 min
Penalties
2 min
32
Shots
28

==== (2) Cornell vs. Dartmouth ====
| Mar 12; 2:00 | Dartmouth | 1–7 (1–2, 0–2, 0–3) | Cornell | Lynah Rink; Attendance: 1,565 |

Game reference

Lindsay Holdcroft
Goalies
Amanda Mazzotta
Referees:
Dan Murphy
Derek Zuckerman
Linesmen:
Andrew DiFusco
Stephen Drain

| | 0–1 | 14:15 – sh – Jenner |
| Dumais (Sharp, Kliman) – pp – 15:27 | 1–1 |
| | 1–2 | 15:58 – Ogilvie (Overguard) |
| | 1–3 | 27:09 – White (Hughes, Young) |
| | 1–4 | 29:14 – Fortino (White, Karpenko) |
| | 1–5 | 44:01 – Karpenko (Johnston, White) |
| | 1–6 | 47:53 – pp – Karpenko (Fortino, Rougeau) |
| | 1–7 | 55:02 – pp – Johnston (Overguard, Jenner) |

10 min
Penalties
8 min
21
Shots
26

==== (3) Boston University vs. Mercyhurst ====
| March 12; 3:00 | Mercyhurst | 2–4 (1–1, 0–1, 1–2) | Boston University | Walter Brown Arena; Attendance: 718 |

Game reference

Hillary Pattenden
Goalies
Kerrin Sperry
Referees:
Bill Doiron
Julie Piacentini
Linesmen:
Chris Leavitt
Tim Kerrigan

| | 0–1 | 11:52 – Wakefield (Kirchner, Boucher) |
| Agosta (Scanzano, Watt) – 16:03 | 1–1 |
| | 1–2 | 28:16 – Poulin (Kohanchu, Cardella) |
| Agosta – pp – 49:06 | 2–2 |
| | 2–3 | 50:56 – Cardella (Watchorn, Miller) |
| | 2–4 | 59:48 – en – Wakefield |

2 min
Penalties
6 min
32
Shots
22

=== National Semifinals ===
==== (1) Wisconsin vs. (4) Boston College ====
| March 18; 4:00 | Boston College | 2–3 (0–2, 1–0, 1–1) | Wisconsin | Tullio Arena; Attendance: 3,482 |

Game reference

Molly Schaus
Goalies
Alex Rigsby
Referees:
Dan Murphy
Derek Zuckerman
Linesmen:
Stephen Drain
Andrew DiFusco

| | 0–1 | 4:23 – Duggan (Knight, Deluce) |
| | 0–2 | 11:58 – pp – Ammerman (Decker, Duggan) |
| Bolden – pp – 28:39 | 1–2 |
| Wasylk – 51:23 | 2–2 |
| | 2–3 | 59:12 – Decker (Duggan, Knight) |

14 min
Penalties
10 min
25
Shots
46

==== (2) Cornell vs. (3) Boston University ====
| March 18; 8:00 | Boston University | 4–1 (1–1, 2–0, 1–0) | Cornell | Tullio Arena; Attendance: 3,531 |

Game reference

Kerrin Sperry
Goalies
Amanda Mazzotta
Referees:
Dan Lick
Chris Perrault
Linesmen:
Tom Jerome
Dave Spivey

| | 0–1 | 5:29 – Overguard (Johnston, Young) |
| Ward (Poulin, Miller) – 10:37 | 1–1 |
| Kirchner (Miller, Holze) – 37:47 | 2–1 |
| Kohanchuk (Wakefield) – 38:37 | 3–1 |
| Lorms (Kohanchuk, Boucher) – en – 57:20 | 4–1 |

6 min
Penalties
6 min
31
Shots
15

=== National Championship ===
==== (1) Wisconsin vs. (3) Boston University ====
| March 20; 2:00 | Boston University | 1–4 (0–0, 1–2, 0–2) | Wisconsin | Tullio Arena; Attendance: 3,965 |

Game reference

Kerrin Sperry
Goalies
Alex Rigsby
Referees:
Julie Piacentini
Dan Lick
Linesmen:
Chris Leavitt
Tim Kerrigan

| | 0–1 | 22:25 – Prevost (Kelter, McKeough) |
| | 0–2 | 35:36 – pp – Ammerman (Decker, Duggan) |
| Poulin – 36:00 | 1–2 |
| | 1–3 | 56:37 – Deluce (Knight) |
| | 1–4 | 59:42 – en – Prevost |

6 min
Penalties
2 min
16
Shots
36

== Tournament awards ==
=== All-Tournament Team ===
- G: Molly Schaus, Boston College
- D: Alev Kelter, Wisconsin
- D: Catherine Ward, Boston University
- F: Brooke Ammerman, Wisconsin
- F: Meghan Duggan*, Wisconsin
- F: Hilary Knight*, Wisconsin
- F: Carolyne Prevost, Wisconsin

* Most Outstanding Player(s)
