= Minnesota–Wisconsin ice hockey rivalry =

College sports rivalry

- Minnesota Golden Gophers Wisconsin Badgers
- Sport: Ice Hockey

The Minnesota–Wisconsin ice hockey rivalry, often referred to as the Border Battle, is an intercollegiate ice hockey rivalry between the Minnesota Golden Gophers and Wisconsin Badgers. An extension of the broader rivalry between the two schools, which includes the Paul Bunyan's Axe football game, the rivalry series is between two of the most successful in collegiate hockey. Including results from both men's and woman's play, the programs have combined for 23 NCAA titles and 59 Frozen Four appearances over their histories. The men's programs compete in the Big Ten Conference, while the women's programs have resided in the Western Collegiate Hockey Association (WCHA) since the National Collegiate Athletic Association first began to sponsor the sport for women.

== Men's ice hockey ==
=== Series history ===
Minnesota–Wisconsin men's ice hockey rivalry
- Minnesota Golden Gophers Wisconsin Badgers
- First meeting: January 20, 1922; Minnesota 3, Wisconsin 0
- Latest meeting: November 7, 2026; Wisconsin 6, Minnesota 0
- Next meeting: February 5, 2027

Statistics
- Total meetings: 320
- All-time series: Minnesota leads, 189–106–26
- Largest victory: Minnesota, 12–2 (1922)
- Longest win streak: Minnesota, 12 (1931–1965)
- Longest unbeaten streak: Minnesota, 24 (1922–1927)
- Current win streak: Wisconsin, 1 (2026–present)

The rivalry has its origins in informal play beginning in 1922, before halting 12 years later. The rivalry was revived in 1965 with Wisconsin resuming its sponsoring of the sport. In the 1981 season, the teams met for their first and only matchups to-date for the national championship. After three periods, the Badgers topped the Gophers by a score of 6 to 3 under head coach Bob Johnson. After competing together in the Western Collegiate Hockey Association since 1999, both teams moved to their all-sports home, the Big Ten Conference, in anticipation of the 2013–14 season as part of widespread NCAA realignment in hockey. While questions surrounded the continuation of many of the rivals' other historic series, such as North Dakota and Minnesota Duluth, their rivalry with each other continued uninterrupted. As of the end of the 2023–24 season, Minnesota leads the series 184–103–25.

=== Rival accomplishments ===
The following summarizes the accomplishments of the two programs.

Team	Minnesota Golden Gophers	Wisconsin Badgers
NCAA National Titles	5	6
NCAA Frozen Four Appearances	23	12*
NCAA Tournament Appearances	42	28*
NCAA Tournament Record	62–43	40–25–2*
Conference Tournament Titles	16	13
Conference Championships	21	4
Hobey Baker Award Winners	4	2
All-Americans	66	41
All-time Program Record	1959–1102–211	1313–915–161
All-time Winning Percentage	.631	.583

- Wisconsin vacated results from the 1992 NCAA tournament

=== Game results ===
Minnesota victories	Wisconsin victories	Tie games

No.	Date	Location	Winner	Score
1	1922	Madison, WI	Minnesota	3–0
2	1922	Madison, WI	Minnesota	3–1
3	1922	St. Paul, MN	Minnesota	12–2
4	1922	St. Paul, MN	Minnesota	7–0
5	1923	Madison, WI	Minnesota	4–1
6	1923	Madison, WI	Tie	1–1
7	1923	Minneapolis, MN	Minnesota	1–0^{OT}
8	1923	Minneapolis, MN	Minnesota	4–0
9	1924	Madison, WI	Minnesota	4–0
10	1924	Madison, WI	Minnesota	5–0
11	1924	St. Paul, MN	Minnesota	4–0
12	1924	St. Paul, MN	Minnesota	4–0
13	1925	Madison, WI	Minnesota	5–1
14	1925	Madison, WI	Minnesota	1–0^{2OT}
15	1925	Minneapolis, MN	Minnesota	1–0
16	1925	Minneapolis, MN	Minnesota	2–0
17	1926	Madison, WI	Tie	0–0
18	1926	Madison, WI	Tie	1–1
19	1926	Minneapolis, MN	Minnesota	3–2
20	1926	Minneapolis, MN	Minnesota	2–1^{OT}
21	1927	Madison, WI	Minnesota	1–0
22	1927	Madison, WI	Minnesota	3–1
23	1927	Minneapolis, MN	Minnesota	1–0
24	1927	Minneapolis, MN	Minnesota	1–0
25	1928	Madison, WI	Wisconsin	2–1^{2OT}
26	1928	Madison, WI	Tie	1–1
27	1928	Minneapolis, MN	Minnesota	1–0
28	1928	Minneapolis, MN	Minnesota	4–1
29	1929	Madison, WI	Wisconsin	2–1
30	1929	Madison, WI	Minnesota	2–0
31	1929	Minneapolis, MN	Minnesota	2–0
32	1929	Minneapolis, MN	Minnesota	4–0
33	1930	Madison, WI	Wisconsin	2–0
34	1930	Madison, WI	Wisconsin	4–3
35	1930	Minneapolis, MN	Minnesota	2–1^{2OT}
36	1930	Minneapolis, MN	Wisconsin	2–1^{OT}
37	1931	Madison, WI	Wisconsin	3–1
38	1931	Minneapolis, MN	Minnesota	2–1
39	1931	Minneapolis, MN	Minnesota	4–1
40	1932	Madison, WI	Minnesota	10–1
41	1933	Madison, WI	Minnesota	6–1
42	1933	Madison, WI	Minnesota	8–0
43	1933	Madison, WI	Minnesota	3–0
44	1934	Madison, WI	Minnesota	1–0
45	1934	Madison, WI	Minnesota	7–0
46	1935	Madison, WI	Minnesota	9–0
47	1965	Madison, WI	Minnesota	7–2
48	1965	Madison, WI	Minnesota	6–1
49	1965	Minneapolis, MN	Minnesota	5–1
50	1966	Madison, WI	Wisconsin	5–4^{OT}
51	1966	Madison, WI	Minnesota	7–1
52	1968	Madison, WI	Minnesota	5–2
53	1968	Minneapolis, MN	Minnesota	3–2^{OT}
54	1968	Minneapolis, MN	Minnesota	5–3
55	1968	Minneapolis, MN	Minnesota	5–1
56	1968	Madison, WI	Tie	3–3
57	1969	Madison, WI	Wisconsin	7–3
58	1969	Ann Arbor, MI	Wisconsin	4–3^{OT}
59	1970	Madison, WI	Wisconsin	10–1
60	1970	Madison, WI	Minnesota	5–3
61	1970	Minneapolis, MN	Minnesota	4–1
62	1970	Minneapolis, MN	Wisconsin	2–0
63	1971	Minneapolis, MN	Minnesota	6–5^{OT}
64	1971	Minneapolis, MN	Wisconsin	6–3
65	1971	Madison, WI	Wisconsin	4–1
66	1971	Madison, WI	Wisconsin	3–2^{OT}
67	1971	Madison, WI	Minnesota	4–3
68	1972	Madison, WI	Wisconsin	9–1
69	1972	Madison, WI	Minnesota	3–0
70	1972	Minneapolis, MN	Minnesota	4–2
71	1972	Minneapolis, MN	Minnesota	7–5
72	1972	Minneapolis, MN	Tie	4–4
73	1972	Minneapolis, MN	Minnesota	4–2
74	1972	St. Louis, MO	Wisconsin	5–1
75	1973	Madison, WI	Minnesota	4–3
76	1973	Madison, WI	Wisconsin	3–0
77	1973	Madison, WI	Wisconsin	8–6
78	1973	Madison, WI	Wisconsin	6–4
79	1973	Minneapolis, MN	Wisconsin	3–2
80	1973	Minneapolis, MN	Wisconsin	8–2
81	1974	Madison, WI	Tie	3–3

No.	Date	Location	Winner	Score
82	1974	Madison, WI	Tie	4–4
83	1974	Madison, WI	Wisconsin	2–1
84	1974	Madison, WI	Minnesota	4–1
85	1975	Minneapolis, MN	Minnesota	4–2
86	1975	Minneapolis, MN	Minnesota	3–1
87	1975	Minneapolis, MN	Wisconsin	4–2
88	1975	Minneapolis, MN	Minnesota	6–1
89	1976	Madison, WI	Minnesota	5–4^{OT}
90	1976	Madison, WI	Wisconsin	9–3
91	1976	Minneapolis, MN	Wisconsin	4–3^{OT}
92	1976	Minneapolis, MN	Wisconsin	7–2
93	1977	Madison, WI	Wisconsin	7–1
94	1977	Madison, WI	Minnesota	5–4
95	1977	Madison, WI	Wisconsin	9–5
96	1977	Madison, WI	Wisconsin	8–3
97	1977	Madison, WI	Wisconsin	4–1
98	1977	Madison, WI	Wisconsin	5–3
99	1978	Minneapolis, MN	Minnesota	3–2^{OT}
100	1978	Minneapolis, MN	Wisconsin	3–1
101	1978	Minneapolis, MN	Minnesota	8–4
102	1978	Minneapolis, MN	Wisconsin	6–5
103	1979	Madison, WI	Minnesota	3–2
104	1979	Madison, WI	Wisconsin	4–3
105	1979	Minneapolis, MN	Minnesota	6–5
106	1979	Minneapolis, MN	Minnesota	7–2
107	1980	Madison, WI	Minnesota	6–4
108	1980	Madison, WI	Minnesota	7–6
109	1980	Madison, WI	Minnesota	5–4^{OT}
110	1980	Madison, WI	Wisconsin	8–3
111	1981	Minneapolis, MN	Minnesota	6–3
112	1981	Minneapolis, MN	Minnesota	8–4
113	1981	Duluth, MN	Wisconsin	6–3
114	1981	Madison, WI	Wisconsin	4–1
115	1981	Madison, WI	Tie	6–6
116	1981	Minneapolis, MN	Wisconsin	6–3
117	1981	Minneapolis, MN	Minnesota	6–4
118	1982	Madison, WI	Minnesota	2–1^{OT}
119	1982	Madison, WI	Wisconsin	5–0
120	1982	Madison, WI	Minnesota	4–3
121	1982	Madison, WI	Wisconsin	6–2
122	1982	Minneapolis, MN	Tie	4–4
123	1982	Minneapolis, MN	Minnesota	9–8
124	1982	Madison, WI	Wisconsin	4–3
125	1982	Madison, WI	Minnesota	5–1
126	1983	Minneapolis, MN	Wisconsin	7–3
127	1983	Minneapolis, MN	Minnesota	5–1
128	1983	Minneapolis, MN	Wisconsin	5–1
129	1983	Minneapolis, MN	Wisconsin	3–2
130	1983	Minneapolis, MN	Minnesota	5–3
131	1983	Minneapolis, MN	Minnesota	7–6
132	1983	Madison, WI	Wisconsin	3–1
133	1983	Madison, WI	Wisconsin	9–0
134	1984	Madison, WI	Wisconsin	5–4
135	1984	Madison, WI	Minnesota	4–1
136	1985	Minneapolis, MN	Minnesota	6–5
137	1985	Minneapolis, MN	Wisconsin	5–4^{OT}
138	1985	Minneapolis, MN	Minnesota	6–0
139	1985	Minneapolis, MN	Minnesota	8–7
140	1985	Minneapolis, MN	Minnesota	5–4^{OT}
141	1985	Minneapolis, MN	Minnesota	6–2
142	1986	Madison, WI	Wisconsin	7–4
143	1986	Madison, WI	Wisconsin	6–4
144	1986	Minneapolis, MN	Minnesota	4–1
145	1986	Minneapolis, MN	Minnesota	7–3
146	1986	Madison, WI	Minnesota	3–2^{OT}
147	1986	Madison, WI	Wisconsin	5–2
148	1987	Minneapolis, MN	Minnesota	5–2
149	1987	Minneapolis, MN	Minnesota	5–2
150	1987	Minneapolis, MN	Wisconsin	2–1
151	1987	Minneapolis, MN	Minnesota	8–4
152	1987	Minneapolis, MN	Minnesota	5–3
153	1987	Minneapolis, MN	Minnesota	5–4^{OT}
154	1988	Madison, WI	Minnesota	1–0
155	1988	Madison, WI	Wisconsin	2–1
156	1988	St. Paul, MN	Wisconsin	3–2
157	1988	Madison, WI	Minnesota	3–2^{OT}
158	1988	Madison, WI	Minnesota	4–2
159	1989	Minneapolis, MN	Minnesota	4–1
160	1989	Minneapolis, MN	Minnesota	5–2
161	1989	St. Paul, MN	Wisconsin	4–3
162	1989	Minneapolis, MN	Minnesota	4–2

No.	Date	Location	Winner	Score
163	1989	Minneapolis, MN	Minnesota	4–2
164	1989	Madison, WI	Minnesota	5–3
165	1989	Madison, WI	Wisconsin	4–3
166	1990	Minneapolis, MN	Wisconsin	6–3
167	1990	Minneapolis, MN	Minnesota	4–2
168	1990	St. Paul, MN	Wisconsin	7–1
169	1990	Minneapolis, MN	Minnesota	9–4
170	1990	Minneapolis, MN	Tie	4–4
171	1991	Madison, WI	Minnesota	5–3
172	1991	Madison, WI	Minnesota	8–1
173	1991	St. Paul, MN	Minnesota	3–2
174	1991	Minneapolis, MN	Minnesota	5–4
175	1991	Minneapolis, MN	Minnesota	4–1
176	1992	Madison, WI	Minnesota	2–1
177	1992	Madison, WI	Wisconsin	4–1
178	1992	Minneapolis, MN	Tie	4–4
179	1992	Bloomington, MN	Wisconsin	3–2
180	1993	Madison, WI	Tie	4–4
181	1993	Madison, WI	Minnesota	4–2
182	1993	St. Paul, MN	Minnesota	3–2
183	1994	Minneapolis, MN	Minnesota	5–2
184	1994	Minneapolis, MN	Minnesota	4–3^{OT}
185	1994	Madison, WI	Minnesota	3–2
186	1994	Madison, WI	Minnesota	3–2
187	1994	Minneapolis, MN	Minnesota	2–1^{OT}
188	1994	Minneapolis, MN	Minnesota	5–2
189	1995	Madison, WI	Minnesota	6–2
190	1995	Madison, WI	Wisconsin	6–5
191	1996	Minneapolis, MN	Minnesota	8–4
192	1996	Minneapolis, MN	Minnesota	5–0
193	1996	Madison, WI	Wisconsin	6–3
194	1996	Madison, WI	Wisconsin	7–4
195	1996	Milwaukee, WI	Minnesota	4–3^{OT}
196	1996	Madison, WI	Wisconsin	3–2
197	1996	Madison, WI	Minnesota	6–1
198	1997	Minneapolis, MN	Minnesota	4–3
199	1997	Minneapolis, MN	Minnesota	7–3
200	1997	Madison, WI	Minnesota	4–2
201	1997	Madison, WI	Wisconsin	3–2
202	1998	Minneapolis, MN	Minnesota	4–1
203	1998	Minneapolis, MN	Minnesota	7–0
204	1998	Madison, WI	Minnesota	3–2
205	1998	Madison, WI	Minnesota	3–2
206	1999	Minneapolis, MN	Wisconsin	6–4
207	1999	Minneapolis, MN	Tie	2–2
208	1999	Madison, WI	Wisconsin	4–3
209	1999	Madison, WI	Wisconsin	5–4^{OT}
210	2000	Minneapolis, MN	Wisconsin	4–2
211	2000	Minneapolis, MN	Wisconsin	5–4
212	2000	Minneapolis, MN	Wisconsin	5–3
213	2000	Minneapolis, MN	Minnesota	4–0
214	2000	Minneapolis, MN	Minnesota	5–2
215	2001	Madison, WI	Wisconsin	4–2
216	2001	Madison, WI	Minnesota	8–2
217	2002	Madison, WI	Wisconsin	8–3
218	2002	Madison, WI	Minnesota	6–2
219	2002	Minneapolis, MN	Minnesota	6–3
220	2002	Minneapolis, MN	Minnesota	4–3^{OT}
221	2002	Madison, WI	Minnesota	3–0
222	2002	Madison, WI	Minnesota	3–2
223	2003	Minneapolis, MN	Minnesota	5–2
224	2003	Minneapolis, MN	Minnesota	8–1
225	2003	Madison, WI	Tie	3–3
226	2003	Madison, WI	Wisconsin	4–3
227	2004	Minneapolis, MN	Minnesota	4–2
228	2004	Minneapolis, MN	Minnesota	3–2
229	2004	Minneapolis, MN	Minnesota	3–2
230	2004	Minneapolis, MN	Minnesota	4–2
231	2005	Madison, WI	Wisconsin	3–1
232	2005	Madison, WI	Minnesota	5–3
233	2005	Minneapolis, MN	Wisconsin	4–3
234	2005	Minneapolis, MN	Wisconsin	4–0
235	2006	Madison, WI	Minnesota	5–4
236	2006	Madison, WI	Minnesota	3–1
237	2006	St. Paul, MN	Wisconsin	4–0
238	2006	Minneapolis, MN	Minnesota	2–1
239	2006	Minneapolis, MN	Minnesota	3–1
240	2007	Madison, WI	Wisconsin	2–1
241	2007	Madison, WI	Minnesota	1–0
242	2007	St. Paul, MN	Minnesota	4–2
243	2008	Madison, WI	Wisconsin	3–1

No.	Date	Location	Winner	Score
244	2008	Madison, WI	Tie	2–2
245	2008	Minneapolis, MN	Minnesota	4–2
246	2008	Minneapolis, MN	Tie	4–4
247	2008	Madison, WI	Tie	2–2
248	2008	Madison, WI	Minnesota	5–2
249	2009	Minneapolis, MN	Wisconsin	3–2
250	2009	Minneapolis, MN	Wisconsin	5–4
251	2009	Madison, WI	Wisconsin	4–2
252	2009	Madison, WI	Minnesota	5–2
253	2010	Minneapolis, MN	Wisconsin	3–2
254	2010	Minneapolis, MN	Minnesota	6–1
255	2010	Minneapolis, MN	Wisconsin	6–0
256	2010	Minneapolis, MN	Tie	3–3
257	2011	Madison, WI	Minnesota	5–2
258	2011	Madison, WI	Tie	3–3
259	2011	Madison, WI	Wisconsin	3–1
260	2011	Madison, WI	Minnesota	4–1
261	2012	Minneapolis, MN	Wisconsin	4–1
262	2012	Minneapolis, MN	Minnesota	2–1
263	2012	Minneapolis, MN	Tie	2–2
264	2012	Minneapolis, MN	Minnesota	3–1
265	2013	Madison, WI	Minnesota	3–2
266	2013	Chicago, IL	Wisconsin	3–2
267	2013	Minneapolis, MN	Minnesota	4–1
268	2013	Minneapolis, MN	Minnesota	4–3
269	2014	Madison, WI	Wisconsin	2–1
270	2014	Madison, WI	Wisconsin	2–1
271	2015	Minneapolis, MN	Tie	2–2
272	2015	Minneapolis, MN	Minnesota	5–2
273	2015	Madison, WI	Minnesota	7–5
274	2015	Madison, WI	Tie	4–4
275	2016	Madison, WI	Minnesota	4–0
276	2016	Madison, WI	Minnesota	9–2
277	2016	Minneapolis, MN	Wisconsin	4–3
278	2016	Minneapolis, MN	Minnesota	4–1
279	2017	Madison, WI	Minnesota	4–3^{OT}
280	2017	Madison, WI	Wisconsin	5–3
281	2017	Minneapolis, MN	Wisconsin	3–2
282	2017	Minneapolis, MN	Minnesota	3–2
283	2017	Minneapolis, MN	Minnesota	5–4
284	2017	Minneapolis, MN	Wisconsin	3–2
285	2018	Madison, WI	Minnesota	4–2
286	2018	Madison, WI	Minnesota	7–1
287	2018	Madison, WI	Minnesota	3–2
288	2018	Madison, WI	Wisconsin	3–1
289	2019	Minneapolis, MN	Minnesota	9–4
290	2019	Minneapolis, MN	Wisconsin	4–3
291	2019	Minneapolis, MN	Minnesota	4–1
292	2019	Minneapolis, MN	Tie	3–3
293	2020	Madison, WI	Minnesota	6–3
294	2020	Madison, WI	Minnesota	4–2
295	2021	Madison, WI	Wisconsin	3–1
296	2021	Madison, WI	Minnesota	5–3
297	2021	Minneapolis, MN	Wisconsin	4–1
298	2021	Minneapolis, MN	Wisconsin	8–1
299	2021	Notre Dame, IN	Minnesota	6–4
300	2021	Madison, WI	Wisconsin	4–3^{OT}
301	2021	Madison, WI	Minnesota	4–1
302	2022	Minneapolis, MN	Minnesota	5–0
303	2022	Minneapolis, MN	Minnesota	8–0
304	2022	Minneapolis, MN	Minnesota	7–1
305	2022	Minneapolis, MN	Minnesota	6–4
306	2023	Madison, WI	Minnesota	4–1
307	2023	Madison, WI	Wisconsin	3–1
308	2023	Minneapolis, MN	Wisconsin	5–2
309	2023	Minneapolis, MN	Wisconsin	3–2
310	2024	Madison, WI	Minnesota	2–1^{OT}
311	2024	Madison, WI	Tie	1–1
312	2024	Madison, WI	Minnesota	3–2
313	2024	Madison, WI	Minnesota	3–2^{OT}
314	2025	Minneapolis, MN	Minnesota	5–2
315	2025	Minneapolis, MN	Minnesota	4–1
316	2025	Madison, WI	Wisconsin	5–2
317	2025	Madison, WI	Wisconsin	4–0
318	2026	Minneapolis, MN	Minnesota	4–1
319	2026	Minneapolis, MN	Minnesota	8–4
320	2026	Minneapolis, MN	Tie	1–1
321	2026	Minneapolis, MN	Wisconsin	6–0
322	2027	Madison, WI		
323	2027	Madison, WI		
Series: Minnesota leads 189–106–26

== Women's ice hockey ==
=== Series history ===
Minnesota–Wisconsin women's ice hockey rivalry
- Minnesota Golden Gophers Wisconsin Badgers
- First meeting: November 19, 1999; Minnesota 7, Wisconsin 4 (Per Wisconsin); February 7, 1998; Minnesota 10, Wisconsin 0 (Per Minnesota)
- Latest meeting: January 31, 2026; Wisconsin 6, Minnesota 1
- Next meeting: December 4, 2026

Statistics
- All-time record: Wisconsin, 59–58–16 (per Wisconsin); Minnesota, 560-59-16 (Per Minnesota)
- Largest victory: Minnesota, 11–3 (2000) (Per Wisconsin); Minnesota, 10-0 (1998) (Per Minnesota)
- Longest win streak: Minnesota, 14 (2012–2015)
- Longest unbeaten streak: Minnesota, 18 (2011–2015)
- Current win streak: Wisconsin, 1 (2026–present)

Since women's ice hockey became an NCAA sport, the two have been the flagpole programs, with frequent Top-5 meetings and matchups in the NCAA tournament and three national championships. The rivalry is fueled by the local nature of its players; in 2019, 24 players on the two rosters hailed from either Minnesota or Wisconsin. After the Badgers prevailed in the 2019 national title, no team has been ranked lower than eighth nationally during any of their meetings. As of the end of the 2025–26 season, Wisconsin leads the series 60–59–16.

=== Rival accomplishments ===
The following summarizes the accomplishments of the two programs.

Team	Minnesota Golden Gophers	Wisconsin Badgers
NCAA National Titles	6	9
NCAA Frozen Four Appearances	16	17
NCAA Tournament Appearances	23	20
NCAA Tournament Record	28–16	41–10
Conference Tournament Titles	8	11
Conference Championships	11	11
Patty Kazmaier Award Winners	3	7
All-Americans	40	33
All-time Program Record	832–200–65	782–173–69
All-time Winning Percentage	.788	.797

=== Game results ===
Minnesota victories	Wisconsin victories	Tie games

No.	Date	Location	Winner	Score
1	1999	Madison, WI	Minnesota	7–4
2	1999	Madison, WI	Minnesota	5–0
3	2000	Minneapolis, MN	Minnesota	11–3
4	2000	Minneapolis, MN	Minnesota	4–2
5	2000	Bloomington, MN	Minnesota	5–0
6	2000	Middleton, WI	Minnesota	5–2
7	2000	Middleton, WI,	Tie	4–4
8	2001	Minneapolis, MN	Minnesota	6–2
9	2001	Minneapolis, MN	Minnesota	3–1
10	2001	Rochester, MN	Wisconsin	4–3
11	2001	Middleton, WI	Minnesota	4–1
12	2001	Middleton, WI	Minnesota	4–3^{OT}
13	2002	Minneapolis, MN	Wisconsin	2–0
14	2002	Minneapolis, MN	Minnesota	3–2^{OT}
15	2002	Blaine, MN	Minnesota	3–2
16	2002	Minneapolis, MN	Minnesota	3–1
17	2002	Minneapolis, MN	Minnesota	2–1
18	2003	Middleton, WI	Wisconsin	2–1
19	2003	Middleton, WI	Minnesota	2–0
20	2003	Grand Forks, ND	Minnesota	3–1
21	2003	Madison, WI	Minnesota	3–0
22	2003	Madison, WI	Minnesota	3–1
23	2004	Minneapolis, MN	Wisconsin	2–1^{OT}
24	2004	Minneapolis, MN	Minnesota	2–1
25	2004	Madison, WI	Minnesota	2–0
26	2004	Madison, WI	Tie	3–3
27	2005	Minneapolis, MN	Minnesota	4–1
28	2005	Minneapolis, MN	Minnesota	2–1
29	2005	Minneapolis, MN	Minnesota	3–2^{OT}
30	2005	Minneapolis, MN	Wisconsin	2–0
31	2005	Minneapolis, MN	Wisconsin	6–2
32	2006	Madison, WI	Minnesota	3–1
33	2006	Madison, WI	Wisconsin	3–1
34	2006	Minneapolis, MN	Wisconsin	4–1
35	2006	Minneapolis, MN	Wisconsin	3–0

No.	Date	Location	Winner	Score
36	2006	Madison, WI	Wisconsin	3–1
37	2006	Madison, WI	Tie	3–3
38	2007	Minneapolis, MN	Wisconsin	4–1
39	2007	Minneapolis, MN	Wisconsin	3–0
40	2007	Minneapolis, MN	Wisconsin	3–1
41	2007	Madison, WI	Wisconsin	3–0
42	2007	Madison, WI	Minnesota	3–2
43	2008	Minneapolis, MN	Wisconsin	5–1
44	2008	Minneapolis, MN	Tie	2–2
45	2008	Duluth, MN	Wisconsin	4–3
46	2008	Minneapolis, MN	Wisconsin	3–2^{OT}
47	2008	Madison, WI	Tie	1–1
48	2008	Madison, WI	Wisconsin	2–1
49	2009	Minneapolis, MN	Minnesota	4–2
50	2009	Minneapolis, MN	Tie	3–3
51	2009	Minneapolis, MN	Wisconsin	5–3
52	2009	Madison, WI	Wisconsin	4–2
53	2009	Madison, WI	Wisconsin	5–2
54	2010	Minneapolis, MN	Wisconsin	4–3^{OT}
55	2010	Minneapolis, MN	Minnesota	3–2
56	2010	Minneapolis, MN	Minnesota	7–5
57	2010	Minneapolis, MN	Wisconsin	5–0
58	2011	Madison, WI	Tie	2–2
59	2011	Madison, WI	Wisconsin	3–1
60	2011	Minneapolis, MN	Wisconsin	5–4^{OT}
61	2011	Madison, WI	Wisconsin	3–2
62	2011	Madison, WI	Minnesota	3–2
63	2012	Minneapolis, MN	Tie	3–3
64	2012	Minneapolis, MN	Minnesota	1–0
65	2012	Duluth, MN	Minnesota	4–2
66	2012	Minneapolis, MN	Minnesota	4–1
67	2012	Minneapolis, MN	Minnesota	2–0
68	2013	Madison, WI	Minnesota	2–0
69	2013	Madison, WI	Minnesota	5–1
70	2013	Minneapolis, MN	Minnesota	2–1

No.	Date	Location	Winner	Score
71	2013	Minneapolis, MN	Minnesota	2–0
72	2014	Madison, WI	Minnesota	3–2
73	2014	Madison, WI	Minnesota	4–0
74	2014	Hamden, CT	Minnesota	5–3
75	2014	Madison, WI	Minnesota	4–1
76	2014	Madison, WI	Minnesota	2–1
77	2015	Minneapolis, MN	Minnesota	4–1
78	2015	Minneapolis, MN	Tie	1–1
79	2015	Minneapolis, MN	Minnesota	3–1
80	2015	Madison, WI	Wisconsin	3–2^{OT}
81	2015	Madison, WI	Wisconsin	3–1
82	2016	Minneapolis, MN	Minnesota	4–0
83	2016	Minneapolis, MN	Minnesota	4–3^{OT}
84	2016	Minneapolis, MN	Wisconsin	1–0
85	2016	Durham, NH	Minnesota	3–2^{OT}
86	2016	Madison, WI	Minnesota	2–0
87	2016	Madison, WI	Wisconsin	8–2
88	2017	Minneapolis, MN	Tie	1–1
89	2017	Minneapolis, MN	Tie	0–0
90	2017	Minneapolis, MN	Wisconsin	3–2
91	2017	Minneapolis, MN	Wisconsin	2–1^{OT}
92	2018	Madison, WI	Wisconsin	4–3
93	2018	Madison, WI	Wisconsin	1–0
94	2018	Minneapolis, MN	Minnesota	3–1
95	2018	Minneapolis, MN	Wisconsin	4–0
96	2018	Madison, WI	Minnesota	1–0
97	2018	Madison, WI	Wisconsin	4–1
98	2019	Minneapolis, MN	Wisconsin	2–1
99	2019	Minneapolis, MN	Minnesota	3–1
100	2019	Minneapolis, MN	Wisconsin	3–1
101	2019	Hamden, CT	Wisconsin	2–0
102	2019	Minneapolis, MN	Minnesota	4–2
103	2019	Minneapolis, MN	Tie	2–2
104	2020	Madison, WI	Wisconsin	5–4
105	2020	Madison, WI	Wisconsin	3–0

No.	Date	Location	Winner	Score
106	2021	Madison, WI	Wisconsin	5–0
107	2021	Madison, WI	Wisconsin	6–3
108	2021	Minneapolis, MN	Minnesota	4–3^{OT}
109	2021	Minneapolis, MN	Tie	2–2
110	2021	Minneapolis, MN	Wisconsin	5–3
111	2021	Madison, WI	Minnesota	3–2
112	2021	Madison, WI	Tie	2–2
113	2022	Minneapolis, MN	Minnesota	2–1
114	2022	Minneapolis, MN	Minnesota	4–3
115	2022	Madison, WI	Tie	3–3
116	2022	Madison, WI	Wisconsin	4–1
117	2023	Minneapolis, MN	Tie	2–2
118	2023	Minneapolis, MN	Wisconsin	7–5
119	2023	Minneapolis, MN	Minnesota	4–2
120	2023	Duluth, MN	Wisconsin	3–2^{OT}
121	2023	Minneapolis, MN	Minnesota	5–3
122	2023	Minneapolis, MN	Wisconsin	5–1
123	2024	Madison, WI	Wisconsin	4–3^{OT}
124	2024	Madison, WI	Wisconsin	4–0
125	2024	Minneapolis, MN	Wisconsin	4–3^{OT}
126	2024	Minneapolis, MN	Wisconsin	5–0
127	2024	Minneapolis, MN	Wisconsin	4–3
128	2025	Madison, WI	Wisconsin	8–2
129	2025	Madison, WI	Wisconsin	6–1
130	2025	Duluth, MN	Wisconsin	4–3
131	2025	Minneapolis, MN	Wisconsin	6–2
132	2025	Madison, WI	Minnesota	5–1
133	2025	Madison, WI	Wisconsin	7–2
134	2026	Minneapolis, MN	Minnesota	3–2^{OT}
135	2026	Minneapolis, MN	Wisconsin	6–1
136	2026	Minneapolis, MN		
137	2027	Madison, WI		
Series: Minnesota leads 60–59–16
