= Matt Desrosiers =

Ice hockey coach (born 1979)

Current position
- Title: Head coach
- Team: Clarkson
- Conference: ECAC Hockey
- Record: 401–99–45

Biographical details
- Born: June 6, 1979 (age 47); Potsdam NY
- Education: St. Lawrence University

Playing career
- 1997–2001: St. Lawrence Saints
- 2001–2002: Dayton Bombers
- 2001–2004: South Carolina Stingrays
- 2004–2006: Colorado Eagles
- Position: Defenseman

Coaching career (HC unless noted)
- 2006–2008: Clarkson (assistant)
- 2008–present: Clarkson

Head coaching record
- Overall: 401–99–45

Accomplishments and honors

Championships
- 3 NCAA (2014, 2017, 2018); 2 ECAC Tournament (2017, 2018, 2024); 4 ECAC Regular Season (2014, 2015, 2017, 2018, 2024)

Awards
- USCHO.com Coach of Year (2014); 2x ECAC Coach of the Year (2014, 2015, 2024)

Matt Desrosiers is the current head coach of the Clarkson Golden Knight's women's ice hockey team. He has served in that capacity since the 2008–09 season. From 2008 until 2014, he served as co–head coach with his wife, Shannon Desroisers.

== Tournament History ==
He has won three NCAA Championships in 2014, 2017 and 2018. He has appeared in three NCAA Frozen Fours. Desrosiers has appeared in seven tournaments with an NCAA Tournament record of 10–4.

2009–10:

- Quarterfinals: Clarkson 2 vs. Minnesota 3 (OT)

2012–13

- Quarterfinals: Clarkson 3 vs. Boston University 5

2013–14

- Quarterfinals: Clarkson 3 vs. Boston College 1
- Frozen Four: Clarkson 5 vs. Mercyhurst 1
- Championship: Clarkson 5 vs. Minnesota 4

2014–15

- Quarterfinals: Clarkson 1 vs. Boston College 5

2015–16

- Quarterfinals: Clarkson 1 vs. Quinnipiac 0
- Frozen Four: Clarkson 2 vs. Boston College 3 (OT)

2016–17

- Quarterfinals: Clarkson 3 vs. Cornell 1
- Frozen Four: Clarkson 4 vs. Minnesota 3
- Championship: Clarkson 3 vs. Wisconsin 0

2017–18

- Quarterfinals: Clarkson 2 vs. Mercyhurst 1
- Frozen Four: Clarkson 1 vs. Ohio State 0 (OT)
- Championship: Clarkson 2 vs. Colgate 1 (OT)

2018–19

- Quarterfinals: Clarkson 2 vs. Boston College 1
- Frozen Four: Clarkson 0 vs. Wisconsin 5

== Coaching Record ==
Record table
Season	Team	Overall	Conference	Standing	Postseason
Clarkson Golden Knights (ECAC Hockey) (2008–present)
2008–09	Clarkson	16–14–6	10–8–4	7th	
2009–10	Clarkson	23–12–5	14–5–3	2nd	NCAA Quarterfinals
2010–11	Clarkson	14–17–8	10–8–4	6th	
2011–12	Clarkson	22–10–5	15–5–2	3rd	
2012–13	Clarkson	28–10–0	18–4–0	T–2nd	NCAA Quarterfinals
2013–14	Clarkson	31–5–5	16–2–4	1st	NCAA Champion
2014–15	Clarkson	24–11–3	16–4–2	T–1st	NCAA Quarterfinals
2015–16	Clarkson	30–5–5	14–3–5	2nd	NCAA Frozen Four
2016–17	Clarkson	32–4–5	19–1–2	1st	NCAA Champion
2017–18	Clarkson	36–4–1	19–3–0	1st	NCAA Champion
2018–19	Clarkson	30–8–2	16–5–1	2nd	NCAA Frozen Four
Clarkson:		286–100–45	167–48–27		
Total:		286–100–45			
National champion Postseason invitational champion Conference regular season champion Conference regular season and conference tournament champion Division regular season champion Division regular season and conference tournament champion Conference tournament champion

== See also ==
- List of college women's ice hockey career coaching wins leaders
