= Shea Tiley =

Canadian ice hockey goaltender

- Born: December 2, 1996 (age 29) Phoenix, Arizona, United States
- Height: 5 ft 10 in (178 cm)
- Weight: 148 lb (67 kg; 10 st 8 lb)
- Position: Goaltender
- Catches: Left
- PWHPA team Former teams: Toronto; HV71; Toronto Furies; Clarkson Golden Knights
- National team: Canada
- Playing career: 2012–present
Medal record
World U18 Championships
Gold medal – first place	2014 Hungary
4 Nations Cup
Silver medal – second place	2018 Canada

Shea Tiley (born December 2, 1996) is an American-born Canadian ice hockey goaltender, currently affiliated with the Toronto chapter of the Professional Women's Hockey Players Association (PWHPA). She made her debut with the Canadian women's national ice hockey team at the 2018 4 Nations Cup.

== Playing career ==
Competing with the Saugeen-Maitland Lightning of the Lower Lakes Female Hockey, she captured a bronze medal during the league's 2013 postseason. Later that year, Tiley was named to Team Ontario Blue, where the roster would capture a silver medal at the 2013 National Women's Under-18 Championships.

She played the 2013–14 season with the Kitchener-Waterloo Lady Rangers of the Provincial Women's Hockey League (PWHL).

=== Hockey Canada ===
Prior to her appearance at the 2018 edition of the 4 Nations Cup, Tiley earned a gold medal with the Canadian women's national under-18 ice hockey team at the 2014 IIHF World Women's U18 Championship in Budapest, Hungary.

=== NCAA ===
Playing with the Clarkson Golden Knights women's ice hockey program, Tiley captured back-to-back NCAA Women's Ice Hockey Tournament championships in 2017 and 2018.

As a freshman, Tiley helped the Golden Knights qualify for the NCAA Tournament, appearing in the quarter-finals, while pacing all ECAC Hockey backstops in goals against average with a minuscule 1.16. She was also the conference goaltending leader in save percentage (.948) and wins (16), respectively. By season's end, she was recognized as both the ECAC Goaltender of the Year and Rookie of the Year. Worth noting, she was named to the ECAC First All-Star Team.

The 2015–16 season resulted in Tiley appearing in her first-ever NCAA Frozen Four with Clarkson. Her five shutouts would rank fifth in the NCAA while her goals against average of 1.32 placed sixth nationally.

For the month of December 2017, Tiley was recognized as the Hockey Commissioners Association National Division I Player of the Month. During said month, she posted an undefeated mark of 4-0-0, including a shutout. Her goals against average of 0.75 was the best of any goaltender in the ECAC Conference during the month of December. As a side note, she also recorded 79 saves on 82 shots, for a .963 save percentage.

=== CWHL ===
Tiley was a first round pick of the Toronto Furies in the 2018 CWHL Draft. Making her CWHL debut on October 14, 2018, Tiley allowed two goals in a loss to the Shenzhen KRS Rays. In her next start, she would rack up 28 saves for the first win of her CWHL career.

Hosting the Rays once again, the October 17 home match resulted in Tiley also being named the First Star of the Game, while teammate Emma Greco gained Second Star honors. Hannah Miller, who scored the Rays' only goal of the game against Tiley was recognized as the Third Star. With the score tied at 1–1 in the third, Sarah Nurse would record the first goal of her CWHL career on the power play. Recording said goal at the 8:54 mark of the third, it also stood as the game-winning goal. Laster in the period, Carolyne Prevost would score for the Furies in a 3–1 final.

=== PWHPA ===
Standing between the pipes for Team Sonnet (Toronto), Tiley participated in the 2021 Secret Cup, which was the Canadian leg of the 2020–21 PWHPA Dream Gap Tour. In a 4-2 championship game loss versus Team Bauer (Montreal), she had 25 saves.

== Career stats ==
=== PWHL ===
Season	Team	GP	W	L	T	MIN	GA	GAA	SO
2014-15	KW Rangers	23	9	1	0	1103	43	1.95	6

=== Hockey Canada ===
Year	Event	GP	W	L	T	MIN	GA	GAA	SO
2013	U18 vs. USA	2	1	1	0	120	4	2.00	0
2014	U18 WWC	5	3	0	0	183	1	0.33	2
2016	NWDT vs. Sweden	1	0	0	0	30	0	0.00	0
2016	NWDT vs. USA	1	1	0	0	30	0	0.00	0

=== NCAA ===
Season	GP	MIN	W	L	T	GA	SV	Shots	Sv %	GAA
2014-15	38	2182:48	24	11	3	51	788	839	.939	1.40
2015-16	37	2151:48	27	5	5	49	649	698	.930	1.37
2016-17	37	2207:33	28	4	5	58	788	846	.931	1.58
2017-18	40	2405:31	35	4	1	48	825	873	.945	1.2

=== CWHL ===
2018-19 season in progress

Season	Team	GP	W	L	T	MIN	GA	SO	GAA	Shots	Saves	Save %
2018-19	Toronto Furies	4	1	3	0	238	11	0	2.77	119	108	0.908%

== Awards and honors ==
=== NCAA ===
- 2015 ECAC Goaltender of the Year
- 2015 ECAC Rookie of the Year
- 2015 ECAC First All-Star Team
- 2015 USCHO All-Rookie Team
- 2017 ECAC tournament Most Outstanding Player
- 2017 ECAC Third All-Star Team
- 2017 ECAC All-Tournament Team
- 2017 ECAC All-Academic Team
- 2017 Second Team All-USCHO.com
- ECAC Hockey Goaltender of the Month, October 2018
- ECAC Hockey Goaltender of the Month, December 2018
- Hockey Commissioners Association National Division I Player of the Month, December 2018
- 2018 Patty Kazmaier Memorial Award Top 10 Finalist
- 2018 First Team AHCA All-American
- 2018 NCAA Frozen Four Most Valuable Player
- 2017–18 NCAA leader, Minutes Played (2405:32)
- 2017–18 NCAA leader, Save Percentage (.945)
- 2017–18 NCAA leader, Wins (35)
- 2017–18 Co-NCAA leader, Shutouts (12)

== Personal ==
Her father, Brad Tiley was selected by the Boston Bruins in the 1991 NHL entry draft, competing numerous seasons in the American Hockey League.
