= Brad Tiley =

Canadian ice hockey player (born 1971)

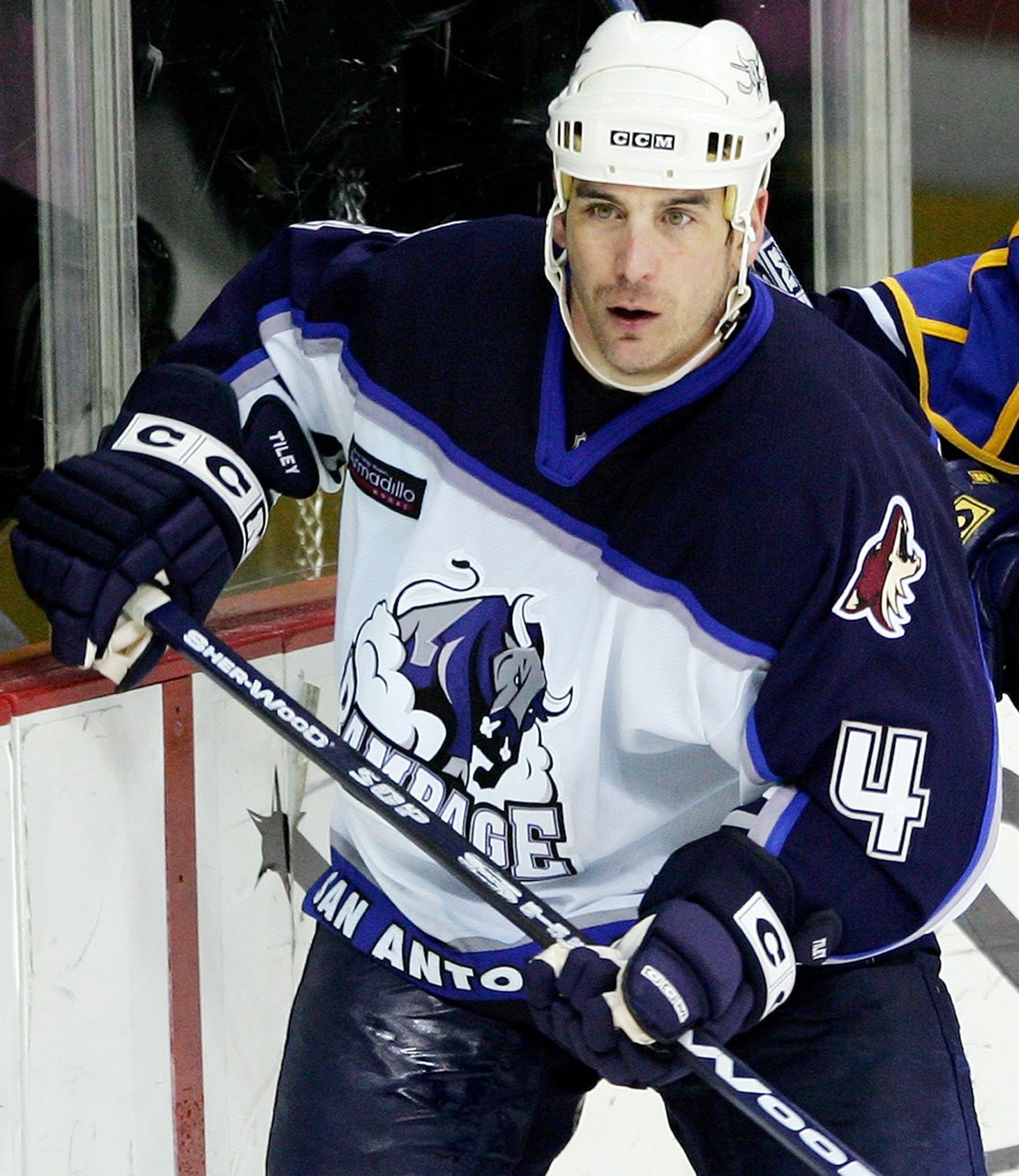
- Tiley with the San Antonio Rampage in 2006
- Born: July 5, 1971 (age 55) Markdale, Ontario, Canada
- Height: 6 ft 1 in (185 cm)
- Weight: 199 lb (90 kg; 14 st 3 lb)
- Position: Defence
- Shot: Left
- Played for: Phoenix Coyotes; Philadelphia Flyers; Iserlohn Roosters
- NHL draft: 84th overall, 1991; Boston Bruins
- Playing career: 1991–2009

Bradley Phillip Tiley (born July 5, 1971) is a Canadian former professional ice hockey defenceman.

== Playing career ==
Born in Markdale, Ontario, Tiley was drafted 84th overall by the Boston Bruins in the 1991 NHL entry draft. He played junior hockey with the Sault Ste. Marie Greyhounds of the Ontario Hockey League. Tiley played eleven NHL games, nine with the Phoenix Coyotes and two with the Philadelphia Flyers, scoring no points and no penalty minutes. He also played one playoff game for the Coyotes during the 1998–99 NHL season. Tiley finished his playing career with the Nippon Paper Cranes in Japan.

== Coaching career ==
On 17 July 2009 he signed a one-year contract with Owen Sound Attack as Assistant Coach and retired as an active player.

== Personal ==
Tiley lives with his wife Nikki and children Shea, Alex and Ella in Owen Sound, Ontario. His daughter, Shea Tiley captured back-to-back Frozen Four titles at the 2017 NCAA National Collegiate Women's Ice Hockey Tournament and 2018 NCAA National Collegiate Women's Ice Hockey Tournament.

== Career statistics ==
			regular season					Playoffs
Season	Team	League	GP	G	A	Pts	PIM	GP	G	A	Pts	PIM
1987–88	Owen Sound Greys	MWJHL	45	18	25	43	69	—	—	—	—	—
1988–89	Sault Ste. Marie Greyhounds	OHL	50	4	11	15	31	—	—	—	—	—
1989–90	Sault Ste. Marie Greyhounds	OHL	66	9	32	41	47	—	—	—	—	—
1990–91	Sault Ste. Marie Greyhounds	OHL	66	11	55	66	29	14	4	15	19	12
1990–91	Sault Ste. Marie Greyhounds	MC	—	—	—	—	—	3	0	2	2	15
1991–92	Maine Mariners	AHL	62	7	22	29	36	—	—	—	—	—
1992–93	Phoenix Roadrunners	IHL	46	11	27	38	35	—	—	—	—	—
1992–93	Binghamton Rangers	AHL	34	6	11	17	21	8	0	1	1	2
1993–94	Phoenix Roadrunners	IHL	35	8	15	23	21	—	—	—	—	—
1993–94	Binghamton Rangers	AHL	29	6	10	16	6	—	—	—	—	—
1994–95	Detroit Vipers	IHL	56	7	19	26	32	—	—	—	—	—
1994–95	Fort Wayne Komets	IHL	17	2	8	10	2	3	1	2	3	0
1995–96	Orlando Solar Bears	IHL	69	11	23	34	82	23	2	4	6	16
1996–97	Phoenix Roadrunners	IHL	66	8	28	36	34	—	—	—	—	—
1996–97	Long Beach Ice Dogs	IHL	3	1	0	1	2	—	—	—	—	—
1997–98	Phoenix Coyotes	NHL	1	0	0	0	0	—	—	—	—	—
1997–98	Springfield Falcons	AHL	60	10	31	41	36	4	0	4	4	2
1998–99	Phoenix Coyotes	NHL	8	0	0	0	0	1	0	0	0	0
1998–99	Springfield Falcons	AHL	70	9	35	44	14	1	0	0	0	0
1999–2000	Springfield Falcons	AHL	80	14	54	68	51	5	0	4	4	2
2000–01	Philadelphia Flyers	NHL	2	0	0	0	0	—	—	—	—	—
2000–01	Philadelphia Phantoms	AHL	56	11	19	30	10	10	1	2	3	2
2001–02	Philadelphia Phantoms	AHL	56	6	15	21	14	—	—	—	—	—
2002–03	Philadelphia Phantoms	AHL	79	8	28	36	28	—	—	—	—	—
2003–04	Milwaukee Admirals	AHL	75	13	34	47	14	22	1	6	7	6
2004–05	Milwaukee Admirals	AHL	77	8	17	25	23	6	0	5	5	2
2005–06	Springfield Falcons	AHL	30	0	10	10	16	—	—	—	—	—
2005–06	San Antonio Rampage	AHL	41	1	9	10	34	—	—	—	—	—
2006–07	Iserlohn Roosters	DEL	52	5	15	20	42	—	—	—	—	—
2007–08	EHC Linz	AUT	45	7	16	23	38	11	3	5	8	16
2008–09	Nippon Paper Cranes	ALH	36	4	21	25	28	16	1	7	8	16
AHL totals			749	99	295	394	303	56	2	22	24	16
IHL totals			292	48	120	168	208	26	3	6	9	16
NHL totals			11	0	0	0	0	1	0	0	0	0
