= Natalie Buchbinder =

American ice hockey player (born 1999)

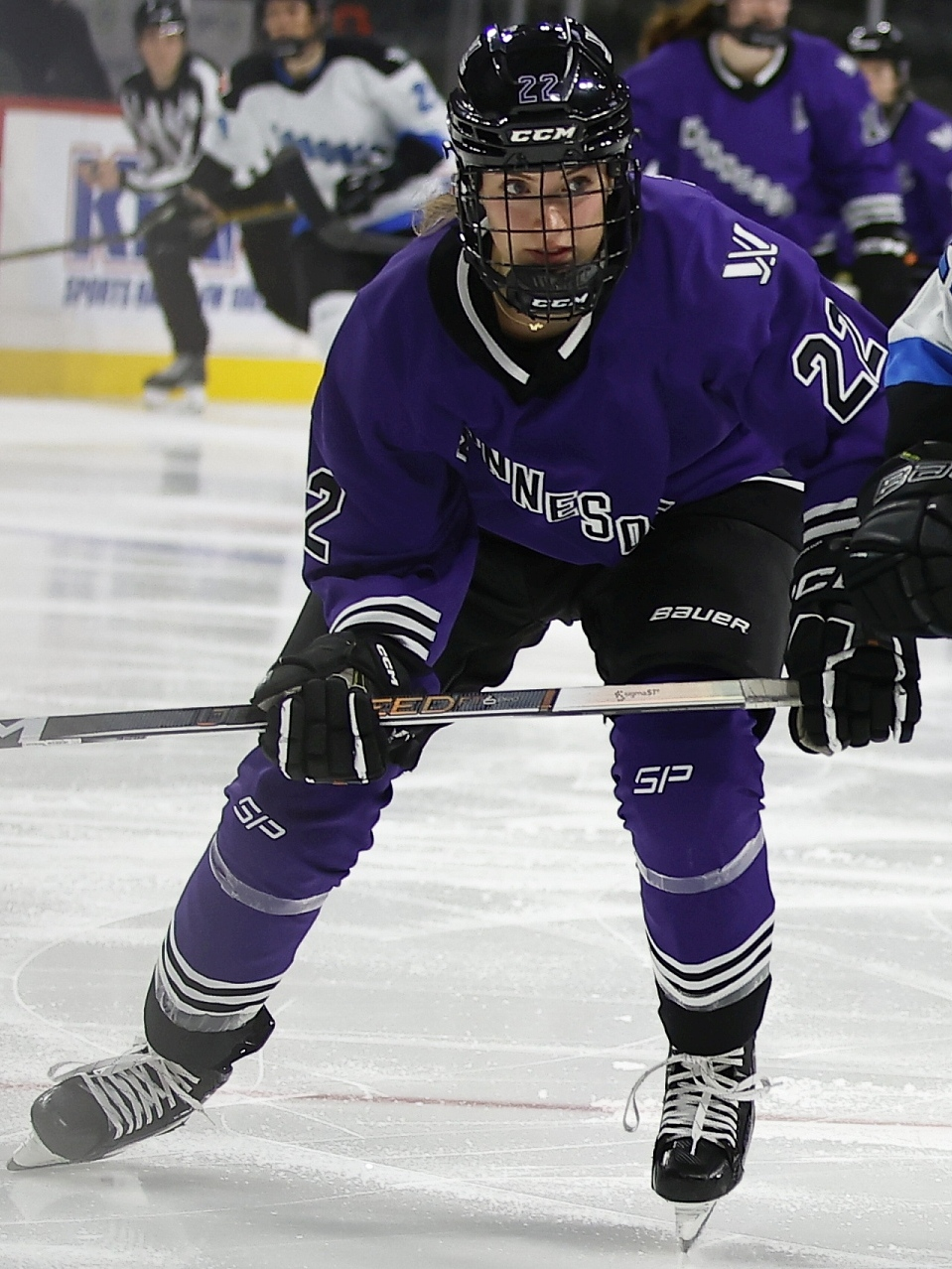
- Buchbinder with PWHL Minnesota in 2024
- Born: January 22, 1999 (age 27) Fairport, New York, U.S.
- Height: 5 ft 8 in (173 cm)
- Weight: 150 lb (68 kg; 10 st 10 lb)
- Position: Defense
- Shoots: Right
- PWHL team: Minnesota Frost
- National team: United States
- Playing career: 2017–present
Medal record
World Championships
Silver medal – second place	2021 Canada
World U18 Championship
Gold medal – first place	2017 Czech Republic

Natalie Buchbinder (born January 22, 1999) is an American professional ice hockey player who is a defender for the Minnesota Frost of the Professional Women's Hockey League (PWHL). She played college ice hockey at Wisconsin where she won three NCAA championships.

== College career ==
Buchbinder began her collegiate career for the Wisconsin Badgers during the 2017–18 season. During her freshman year, she recorded one goal and five assists in 38 games and ranked fourth on the team in with 38 blocks. During the 2018–19 season in her sophomore year, she recorded two goals and 12 assists in 41 games. Defensively she helped the Badgers team that allowed zero goals during the playoffs, as they won the 2019 NCAA tournament. During the 2019–20 season in her junior year, she recorded one goal and 15 assists in 36 games and ranked second on the team with 42 blocks.

During the 2020–21 season in her senior year, she recorded one goal and three assists in 15 games and won the 2021 NCAA tournament. After a year of playing with a torn labrum in her left hip, she underwent surgery in September 2020. Due to the COVID-19 pandemic delaying the beginning of the season and other coronavirus-related cancellations, Buchbinder missed only six games. She made her season debut on January 15, 2021, in a game against Minnesota.

She redshirted during the 2021–22 season to take part in USA Hockey's Residency Program, and participated in the first two games of the 2021 My Why Tour.

On September 15, 2022, Buchbinder was named an alternate captain for the 2022–23 season. In her redshirt senior year, she recorded 15 assists in 24 games, and won the 2023 NCAA tournament. She suffered a season-ending lower leg injury in January 2023.

== Professional career ==
On September 18, 2023, Buchbinder was drafted 37th overall by PWHL Minnesota in the 2023 PWHL Draft. On November 27, 2023, she signed a two-year contract with Minnesota. During the 2023–24 season, she recorded two goals and four assists in 24 regular season games. During the playoffs she recorded one assist in ten games and helped Minnesota win the inaugural Walter Cup championship.

During the 2024–25 season, she recorded two assists in 19 games, in a season that was shortened due to injury. On January 8, 2025, she suffered an upper-body injury in a game against the Boston Fleet and was placed on the long-term injured reserve list. On June 16, 2025, she signed a two-year contract extension with the Frost.

== International play ==
Buchbinder represented the United States at the 2017 IIHF World Women's U18 Championship, where she appeared in five games and won a gold medal.

On March 30, 2021, she was named to the roster for the United States at the 2021 IIHF Women's World Championship. She didn't appear in any games for Team USA and won a silver medal.

== Career statistics ==
=== Regular season and playoffs ===
Note: GP = Games played; G = Goals; A = Assists; Pts = Points; PIM = Penalty minutes;

			Regular season					Playoffs
Season	Team	League	GP	G	A	Pts	PIM	GP	G	A	Pts	PIM
2017–18	University of Wisconsin	WCHA	38	1	5	6	4	—	—	—	—	—
2018–19	University of Wisconsin	WCHA	41	2	12	14	4	—	—	—	—	—
2019–20	University of Wisconsin	WCHA	36	1	15	16	4	—	—	—	—	—
2020–21	University of Wisconsin	WCHA	15	1	3	4	2	—	—	—	—	—
2022–23	University of Wisconsin	WCHA	24	0	15	15	2	—	—	—	—	—
2023–24	PWHL Minnesota	PWHL	24	2	4	6	0	10	0	2	2	2
2024–25	Minnesota Frost	PWHL	19	0	2	2	2	8	0	0	0	2
PWHL totals			43	2	6	8	8	18	0	2	2	4

=== International ===
Year	Team	Event	Result	GP	G	A	Pts	PIM
2017	United States	U18	1st place, gold medalist(s)	5	0	0	0	2
Junior totals				5	0	0	0	2

== Awards and honors ==
Honors	Year
PWHL
Walter Cup Champion	2024, 2025
