= NCAA Division I ice hockey tournament =

NCAA Division I ice hockey tournament may refer to:

- NCAA Division I men's ice hockey tournament
- NCAA women's ice hockey tournament
