= Marlène Boissonnault =

Canadian ice hockey player (born 1997)

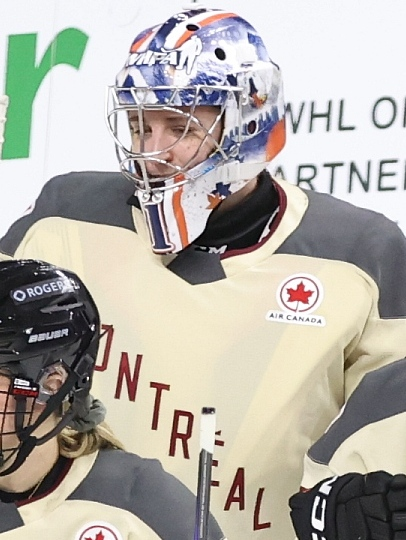
- Boissonnault with PWHL Montreal in 2024
- Born: June 19, 1997 (age 29) Dundee, New Brunswick, Canada
- Height: 5 ft 10 in (178 cm)
- Weight: 172 lb (78 kg; 12 st 4 lb)
- Position: Goaltender
- Catches: Left
- PWHL team Former teams: Minnesota Frost; Montreal Victoire; PWHPA; KRS Vanke Rays; Cornell Big Red
- Playing career: 2015–present

Marlène Boissonnault (born June 19, 1997) is a Canadian professional ice hockey player who is a goaltender for the Minnesota Frost of the Professional Women's Hockey League (PWHL). She was previously signed by the Montreal Victoire.

== Playing career ==
Boissonnault started playing hockey at a young age, moving up the minor hockey system. She would then play for Rothesay Netherwood School in Rothesay and later took the chance to play for Cornell University. Across four years of NCAA Division I women's ice hockey with the Cornell Big Red of ECAC Hockey, Boissonnault finished with 56 wins, the second highest total in the university's history, and 15 shutouts, the third most in Cornell history. In 2019, the team made the Frozen Four.

After she graduated, she joined the Professional Women's Hockey Players Association (PWHPA), as the Canadian Women's Hockey League (CWHL) had just folded and she felt more aligned with the goals of the PWHPA than the National Women's Hockey League (NWHL).

Boissonnault spent the 2023–24 PWHL season as the third goaltender for the Montreal Victoire but did not play a game. She attended their 2024–25 training camp but did not make the roster. After Lucy Morgan was signed by Ottawa on March 14, 2025, the Minnesota Frost signed Boissonnault to a Reserve Player Contract. On July 18, 2025, she signed a one-year contract extension with the Minnesota Frost.

== International play ==
Boissonnault represented Canada at the 2015 IIHF Women’s World U18 Championship, winning a silver medal. In 2017, she was named to the National Women’s Development Team roster.

== Personal life ==
Boissonault’s brother is a former New Brunswick’s Strongest Man and SCC Atlantic Canada’s Strongest Man, Émile Boissonnault. Boissonnault has a pre-med degree from Cornell University.
