= Élizabeth Giguère =

Canadian ice hockey player (born 1997)

- Born: May 8, 1997 (age 29) Quebec City, Quebec, Canada
- Height: 5 ft 10 in (178 cm)
- Position: Right wing
- Shoots: Right
- PWHL team Former teams: Minnesota Frost; Boston Pride; New York Sirens
- Playing career: 2017–present

Élizabeth Giguère (born May 8, 1997) is a Canadian ice hockey player who is a forward for the Minnesota Frost of the Professional Women's Hockey League (PWHL). She previously played for the New York Sirens of the PWHL and the Boston Pride of the Premier Hockey Federation (PHF). She played college ice hockey with the Clarkson Golden Knights and the Minnesota Duluth Bulldogs, and won the Patty Kazmaier Award in 2020.

== Playing career ==
=== College ===
Giguère began her collegiate career for the Clarkson Golden Knights during the 2017–18 season. During her freshman season, Giguère recorded 27 goals and 44 assists, setting Clarkson's program record for freshman scoring with 71 points. She was named the HCA National Rookie of the Month in December and March. She was also named the ECAC Hockey Rookie of the Month in October, December, January, and March. During the 2018 NCAA National Collegiate Women's Ice Hockey Tournament, she recorded the game-winning goal in overtime to send Clarkson to the Frozen Four. During the National Championship game against Colgate, she again recorded the game-winning goal in overtime, helping lead Clarkson to their second consecutive NCAA Tournament championship. Following the tournament, she was named to the 2018 Frozen Four All-Tournament team. Following an outstanding freshman season, she was named to the ECAC Hockey All-Rookie Team, ECAC Hockey First Team All-League, ECAC Hockey Rookie of the Year, and a Second-Team All-American.

During the 2018–19 season, Giguère led the NCAA in scoring, recording 26 goals and 47 assists in 40 games. She recorded a Clarkson program record five shorthanded goals during the season. She was named the ECAC Hockey Player of the Month in November, after she recorded 15 points in 10 games, including a nation-high 12 goals during the month. She recorded her first career hat-trick in 5–1 victory over Yale on January 18, 2019. During the 2019 NCAA National Collegiate Women's Ice Hockey Tournament, she recorded the game-winning goal in overtime against Boston College to send Clarkson to the Frozen Four for the fourth consecutive season. This was her third game-winning overtime goal in four NCAA Tournament games. Following an outstanding sophomore season, she was named to the ECAC Hockey Second Team All-League, a Top 10 Patty Kazmaier Award finalist, a First Team All-American, and USCHO.com Player of the Year.

During the 2019–20 season, Giguère led the NCAA in goals, recording 37 goals in 37 games, and tied for second in the NCAA in scoring with 66 points. She tied for the nation lead in game-winning goals with 10, and tied for second in the nation in shorthanded goals with three. She also led the conference in goals (23), points (41) and points per game (1.86). She led the nation in goals in November, recording 12 goals in 10 games, and was subsequently named ECAC Hockey's Player of the Month for November. On December 6, 2019, she recorded her 105th career assist in a 5–0 victory over RPI, setting a Clarkson program record, surpassing the previous record of 104 set by Jamie Lee Rattray and Erin Ambrose. She led the conference in assists (9) and points (13) in January, and was subsequently named ECAC Hockey's Player of the Month for January, and NCAA First Star of the Week for the week ending January 28, 2020. After an outstanding junior season, she was named to the ECAC Hockey First Team All-League, ECAC Hockey Player of the Year, ECAC Hockey's Best Forward, a First Team All-American for the second consecutive season, and was awarded the Patty Kazmaier Award.

On May 20, 2021, Giguère announced she would join Minnesota Duluth for the 2021–22 season as a graduate transfer. She recorded 22 goals and 40 assists in 40 games, to lead the Bulldogs in scoring, and help them advance to the Frozen Four. She finished her collegiate career with 295 points in 177 games, ranking sixth all-time in NCAA Division I history in scoring.

=== Professional ===
On July 28, 2022, Giguère signed a one-year contract with the Boston Pride of the Premier Hockey Federation (PHF). In her first and only PHF season, she recorded 22 points in 18 games. In the following offseason, she signed with the Montreal Force, but would never join them due to the dissolution of the PHF to make way for the Professional Women's Hockey League (PWHL).

On September 18, 2023, Giguère was selected in the fifth round, 28th overall, by PWHL New York in the 2023 PWHL draft. On November 3, 2023, she signed a one-year contract with New York. During the 2024–25 season, she recorded two goals and two assists in 29 games. On June 19, 2025, she signed a one-year contract with the Ottawa Charge.

Following pre-season training camp, she was signed to a reserve player contract for the Minnesota Frost prior to the 2025–26 season. On February 27, 2026, she signed a standard player agreement with the Frost after Kendall Coyne Schofield was placed on the injured reserve list. She finished the season with one assist in 13 regular season games, and was scoreless in five games during the 2026 Walter Cup playoffs. On June 20, 2026, she signed a one-year contract extension with the Frost.

== Personal life ==
Giguère married her wife Claudia Duffy on August 14, 2022.

== International play ==
Giguère represented Canada at the 2015 IIHF World Women's U18 Championship where she ranked second on the team in scoring, recording three goals and four assists in five games, and won a silver medal. She also represented Canada at the 2017 Nations Cup where she recorded two goals and one assist in five games and won a silver medal.

== Career statistics ==
=== Regular season and playoffs ===
			Regular season					Playoffs
Season	Team	League	GP	G	A	Pts	PIM	GP	G	A	Pts	PIM
2014–15	Titans du Cégep Limoilou	RSEQ C	28	26	27	53	–	—	—	—	—	—
2015–16	Titans du Cégep Limoilou	RSEQ C	24	34	20	54	–	—	—	—	—	—
2016–17	Titans du Cégep Limoilou	RSEQ C	21	32	37	69	16	6	7	6	13	2
2017–18	Clarkson University	NCAA	41	27	44	71	24	—	—	—	—	—
2018–19	Clarkson University	NCAA	40	26	47	73	16	—	—	—	—	—
2019–20	Clarkson University	NCAA	37	37	29	66	12	—	—	—	—	—
2020–21	Clarkson University	NCAA	19	9	14	23	14	—	—	—	—	—
2021–22	University of Minnesota Duluth	NCAA	40	22	40	62	6	—	—	—	—	—
2022–23	Boston Pride	PHF	13	6	14	20	4	—	—	—	—	—
2023–24	PWHL New York	PWHL	24	3	1	4	6	—	—	—	—	—
2024–25	New York Sirens	PWHL	29	2	2	4	4	—	—	—	—	—
2025–26	Minnesota Frost	PWHL	13	0	1	1	6	5	0	0	0	2
PWHL totals			66	5	4	9	16	5	0	0	0	2

=== International ===
Year	Team	Event	Result	GP	G	A	Pts	PIM
2015	Canada	U18	2nd place, silver medalist(s)	5	3	4	7	6
Junior totals				5	3	4	7	6

== Awards and honours ==
Honors	Year
College
ECAC Hockey Rookie of the Year	2018
ECAC Hockey All-Rookie Team	2018
ECAC Hockey First Team All-League	2018
CCM/AHCA Hockey Second Team All-American	2018
USCHO.com Player of the Year	2019
CCM/AHCA Hockey First Team All-American	2019
ECAC Hockey Second Team All-League	2019
ECAC Hockey Player of the Year	2020
ECAC Hockey Best Forward	2020
ECAC Hockey First Team All-League	2020
CCM/AHCA Hockey First Team All-American	2020
Patty Kazmaier Award	2020
CCM/AHCA Hockey Second Team All-American	2022

Awards and achievements
Preceded by Loren Gabel	Patty Kazmaier Award; 2019–20	Succeeded by Aerin Frankel
