= 2016 NCAA National Collegiate women's ice hockey tournament =

NCAA women's ice hockey postseason tournament

- 2016 Women's Frozen Four logo
- Teams: 8
- Finals site: Whittemore Center Arena, Durham, New Hampshire
- Champions: Minnesota Golden Gophers (6th title)
- Runner-up: Boston College Eagles (1st title game)
- Semifinalists: Clarkson Golden Knights (2nd Frozen Four); Wisconsin Badgers (9th Frozen Four)
- Winning coach: Brad Frost (4th title)
- MOP: Sarah Potomak (Minnesota)
- Attendance: 5,378, 3,211 for Championship Game

The 2016 NCAA National Collegiate Women's Ice Hockey Tournament involved eight schools in single-elimination play to determine the national champion of women's NCAA Division I college ice hockey. The quarterfinals were contested at the campuses of the seeded teams on March 12, 2016. The Frozen Four was played on March 18 and 20, 2016 at Whittemore Center Arena in Durham, New Hampshire with the University of New Hampshire as the host. Northeastern reached the NCAA tournament for the first time in program history while Princeton reached the tournament for the first time in ten years. Minnesota Golden Gophers defeated the Boston College Eagles 3–1 to win the national championship.

== Qualifying teams ==
2016 Qualifying Teams
WCHA, ECAC, Hockey East, CHA

In the second year under this qualification format, the winners of all four Division I conference tournaments received automatic berths to the NCAA tournament. The other four teams were selected at-large. The top four teams were then seeded and received home ice for the quarterfinals.

Seed	School	Conference	Record	Berth type	Appearance	Last bid
1	Boston College	Hockey East	38–0–0	Tournament champion	8th	2015
2	Wisconsin	WCHA	34–3–1	Tournament champion	10th	2015
3	Minnesota	WCHA	32–4–1	At-large bid	14th	2015
4	Quinnipiac	ECAC	30–2–5	Tournament champion	2nd	2015
	Clarkson	ECAC	29–4–5	At-large bid	5th	2015
	Princeton	ECAC	22–8–2	At-large bid	2nd	2006
	Mercyhurst	CHA	19–10–5	Tournament champion	11th	2014
	Northeastern	Hockey East	28–8–1	At-large bid	1st	Never

== Bracket ==
Quarterfinals held at home sites of seeded teams

National Quarterfinals; March 12
1	Boston College	5
Northeastern	1
4	Quinnipiac	0
Clarkson	1
2	Wisconsin	6
Mercyhurst	0
3	Minnesota	6
Princeton	2

National Semifinals; March 18
1	Boston College	3*
Clarkson	2
2	Wisconsin	2
3	Minnesota	3*

National Championship; March 20
1	Boston College	1
3	Minnesota	3

Note: * denotes overtime period(s)

== Results ==
=== National Quarterfinals ===
==== (1) Boston College vs. Northeastern ====
March 12; 1:00	Northeastern	1–5 (0–2, 0–1, 1–2)	Boston College	Conte Forum; Attendance: 1,077

Game reference

Brittany Bugalski
Goalies
Kaitlin Burt
Referees:
Bryan Hicks
Derek Zuckerman
Linesmen:
James Shea
Stephen Smiley

	0–1	0:50 – Carpenter (Kent, Skarupa)
	0–2	16:54 – Sullivan (Skarupa, Keller)
	0–3	32:51 – Skarupa (Carpenter, Bizal)
	0–4	41:54 – Sullivan (Grieves)
	0–5	57:46 – sh – Carpenter (Skarupa, Keller)
Coyne (Scamurra, Bugalski) – pp – 58:20	1–5

12 min
Penalties
6 min
22
Shots
39

==== (4) Quinnipiac vs. Clarkson ====
March 12; 2:00	Clarkson	1–0 (1–0, 0–0, 0–0)	Quinnipiac	People's United Center; Attendance: 604

Game reference
Shea Tiley	Goalies	Sydney Rossman	Referees: Tom Quinn; Tim Benedetto; Linesmen: Bob Sloper; Tim Daley
Fast – 0:10 / 1–0			Referees: Tom Quinn; Tim Benedetto; Linesmen: Bob Sloper; Tim Daley
6 min	Penalties	8 min	Referees: Tom Quinn; Tim Benedetto; Linesmen: Bob Sloper; Tim Daley
29	Shots	14	Referees: Tom Quinn; Tim Benedetto; Linesmen: Bob Sloper; Tim Daley

==== (2) Wisconsin vs. Mercyhurst ====
March 12; 7:07	Mercyhurst	0–6 (0–2, 0–2, 0–2)	Wisconsin	LaBahn Arena; Attendance: 2,273

Game reference

Sarah McDonnell
Goalies
Ann-Renée Desbiens
Referees:
David Spivey
Krissy Morrison
Linesmen:
Brenda Reinen
Clayton Smith

0–1	8:26 – Cogan (Clark, Pankowski)
0–2	13:26 – Ryan (Cogan, Sowchuk)
0–3	30:47 – sh – McKibbon (Nurse, Ryan)
0–4	35:59 – Clark (Nurse, Gardner)
0–5	52:16 – pp – Nurse (Burke, Pankowski)
0–6	58:02 – Wellhausen (Gardner, Shaver)

8 min
Penalties
8 min
22
Shots
41

==== (3) Minnesota vs. Princeton ====
March 12; 4:07	Princeton	2–6 (1–3, 0–3, 1–0)	Minnesota	Ridder Arena; Attendance: 2,468

Game reference

Kimberly Newell
Goalies
Amanda Leveille
Referees:
Robert Ludwig
Shane Paskey
Linesmen:
Duncan Ryhorchuk
Dan Fitzsimons

McDonnell (Contini, Koelzer) – 0:29	1–0
	1–1	4:47 – pp – Brandt – (Kessel, Stecklein)
	1–2	6:01 – sh – Kessel (Wolfe, Brandt)
	1–3	17:35 – pp – Kessel – (Brandt, Stecklein)
	1–4	34:24 – Potomak (McMillen, Baldwin)
	1–5	36:36 – Cameranesi (Pannek, Cline)
	1–6	37:02 – Kessel (Potomak, Cline)
Contini (MacDonald, McKenna) – 59:57	2–6

6 min
Penalties
6 min
27
Shots
43

=== National Semifinals ===
==== (1) Boston College vs. Clarkson ====
March 18; 4:00	Clarkson	2–3 (OT) (1–0, 1–1, 0–1, 0–1)	Boston College	Whittemore Center

Game reference

Shea Tiley
Goalies
Kaitlin Burt
Referees:
Robert Ludwig
Shane Paskey
Linesmen:
Duncan Ryhorchuk
Clayton Smith

McGill (Bannon, Harmon) – 2:27	1–0
Mercer (Mariani) – 25:29	2–0
	2–1	34:32 – Skarupa (Carpenter, Bender)
	2–2	16:07 – Johnson (Keller, Carpenter)
	2–3	0:58 – Skarupa (Carpenter, Kent)

16 min
Penalties
10 min
36
Shots
32

==== (2) Wisconsin vs. (3) Minnesota ====
March 18; 7:22	Minnesota	3–2 (1–1, 0–1, 1–0, 1–0)	Wisconsin	Whittemore Center; Attendance: 2,167

Game reference

Amanda Leveille
Goalies
Ann-Renée Desbiens
Referees:
Tim Benedetto
Tom Quinn
Linesmen:
Tim Daley
Bob Sloper

Williamson (Stecklein, Wolfe) – 2:15	1–0
	1–1	11:35 – Shaver
	1–2	39:42 – Clark (Cogan, Burke)
Kessel (Brandt, Stecklein) – 40:27	2–2
Potomak – 75:00	3–2

6 min
Penalties
4 min
41
Shots
39

=== National Championship ===
==== (1) Boston College vs. (3) Minnesota ====
March 20; 2:06	Minnesota	3–1 (1–0, 0–0, 2–1)	Boston College	Whittemore Center; Attendance: 3,211

Game reference

Amanda Leveille
Goalies
Kaitlin Burt
Referees:
Bryan Hicks
Derek Zuckerman
Linesmen:
James Shea
Kyle Smiley

Potomak (Brandt, Wolfe) – 0:13	1–0
Kessel (Potomak) – 48:31	2–0
Pannek (Stecklein) – 53:12	3–0
	3–1	54:07 – Newkirk (Keller, Anastos)

8 min
Penalties
6 min
34
Shots
33

== Tournament awards ==
=== All-Tournament Team ===
- G: Amanda Leveille, Minnesota
- D: Lee Stecklein, Minnesota
- D: Megan Keller, Boston College
- F: Sarah Potomak*, Minnesota
- F: Amanda Kessel, Minnesota
- F: Haley Skarupa, Boston College

* Most Outstanding Player

== See also ==
- 2016 NCAA Division I Men's Ice Hockey Tournament
