= Kristen Campbell =

Canadian ice hockey player (born 1997)

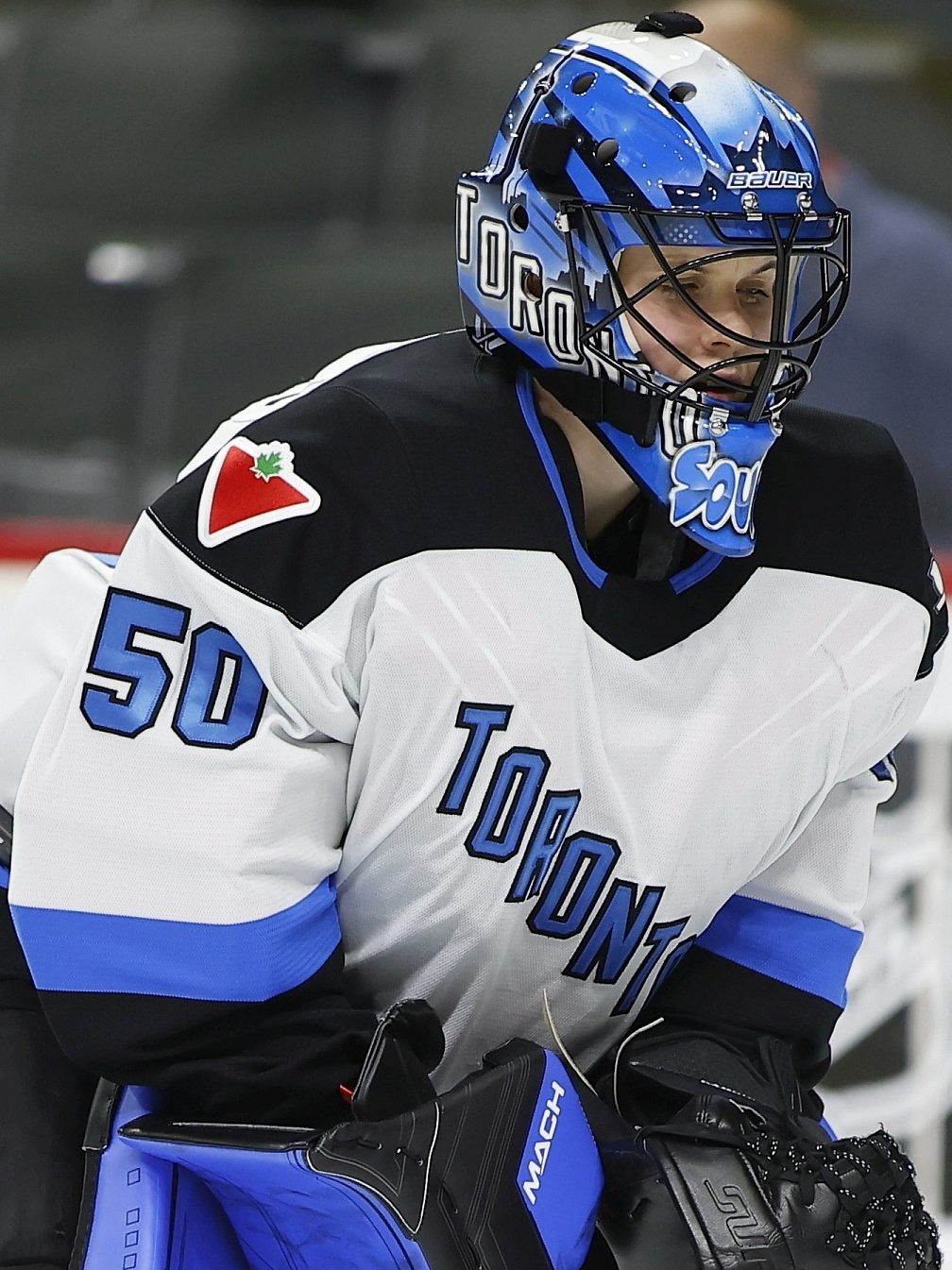
- Campbell with PWHL Toronto in 2024
- Born: November 30, 1997 (age 28) Brandon, Manitoba, Canada
- Height: 175 cm (5 ft 9 in)
- Position: Goaltender
- Catches: Left
- PWHL team Former teams: Vancouver Goldeneyes; Toronto Sceptres; Team Scotiabank
- Playing career: 2020–present
Medal record
Women's ice hockey
Representing Canada
Olympic Games
Gold medal – first place	2022 Beijing	Team
World Championships
Gold medal – first place	2021 Canada
Gold medal – first place	2022 Denmark
Gold medal – first place	2024 United States
Silver medal – second place	2023 Canada
Silver medal – second place	2025 Czechia
World U18 Championships
Silver medal – second place	2015 United States

Kristen Campbell (born November 30, 1997) is a Canadian professional ice hockey player who is a goaltender for the Vancouver Goldeneyes of the Professional Women's Hockey League (PWHL) and member of the Canada women's national ice hockey team. She was the first woman to win the Frozen Four championship without conceding a goal.

== Career ==
Campbell began her university career at the University of North Dakota, where she redshirted her first year. She was forced to transfer to Wisconsin in 2017 after North Dakota dropped its women's hockey program. She would become the fourth goaltender in Wisconsin history to record 90 wins with the university, being named WCHA Goaltender of the Year and a top-10 finalist for the Patty Kazmaier Memorial Award in 2018. In 2019, she would backstop the university to their first national championship since 2011. During the national championship tournament, she was the first goaltender to earn three straight shutouts and was named Most Outstanding Player.

After graduating, she joined the PWHPA ahead of the 2020–21 season.

Campbell was drafted in the third round, 14th overall, to PWHL Toronto. During the 2023–24 season, she posted a 16–6–0 record with three shutouts and a 1.99 goals-against average. Despite her efforts in the postseason, PWHL Toronto would be eliminated in five games by PWHL Minnesota, who would go on to win the Walter Cup. Following the season Campbell was named PWHL Goaltender of the Year. Campbell continued with the Toronto Sceptres for the 2024–25 season, where she posted a 9–8–4 record with a .910 save percentage. Campbell would struggle in the postseason, allowing 12 goals on 49 shots in games two and three, prompting coach Troy Ryan to replace her with Carly Jackson in game four. Minnesota would win game four in overtime by a score of 4–3, with Taylor Heise scoring the series-clinching goal 16 minutes into overtime. The loss eliminated Toronto from the playoffs, while Minnesota advanced to win the Walter Cup for the second consecutive year.

During the 2025 PWHL draft, the Sceptres traded Campbell and the 19th overall pick to the Vancouver Goldeneyes in exchange for the 16th and 23rd overall picks.

== International play ==
Campbell represented Team Canada at the 2015 IIHF World Women's U18 Championship, winning a silver medal. In May 2021, she was one of 28 players invited to Hockey Canada's Centralization Camp, which represents the selection process for the Canadian women's team that shall compete in Ice hockey at the 2022 Winter Olympics.

On January 11, 2022, Campbell was named to Canada's 2022 Olympic team. She was the third goaltender on the roster and did not see any game action, but received a gold medal.

== Personal life ==
Campbell has a degree in rehabilitation psychology.

Campbell's nickname is "Soupy", in reference to Campbell's Soup, which was given to Campbell at a youth goalie camp by one of her instructors.

She is a member of the LGBTQ community and in a relationship with Team Canada Softball Olympian Emma Entzminger.

== Career statistics ==
=== Regular season and playoffs ===
Bold indicates led league

			Regular season									Playoffs
Season	Team	League	GP	W	L	OTL	MIN	GA	SO	GAA	SV%	GP	W	L	MIN	GA	SO	GAA	SV%
2015–16	University of North Dakota	WCHA	0	–	–	–	–	–	–	–	–	–	–	–	–	–	–	–	–
2016–17	University of North Dakota	WCHA	5	1	3	0	227:58	9	1	2.37	.894	–	–	–	–	–	–	–	–
2017–18	University of Wisconsin	WCHA	38	31	5	2	2319:49	46	12	**1.19**	.939	–	–	–	–	–	–	–	–
2018–19	University of Wisconsin	WCHA	**41**	**35**	4	2	**2384:51**	41	**10**	**1.03**	.940	–	–	–	–	–	–	–	–
2019–20	University of Wisconsin	WCHA	31	24	4	3	1815:48	55	4	1.82	.912	–	–	–	–	–	–	–	–
2020–21	Team Scotiabank	PWHPA	2	1	1	0	119:00	6	0	3.03	.919	–	–	–	–	–	–	–	–
2022–23	Team Scotiabank	PWHPA	11	5	0	0	564:00	26	2	2.77	.920	–	–	–	–	–	–	–	–
2023–24	PWHL Toronto	PWHL	22	**16**	6	0	1293:57	43	**3**	1.99	.927	5	2	3	321:03	5	2	**0.93**	**.962**
2024–25	Toronto Sceptres	PWHL	21	9	8	**4**	1227:46	46	0	2.25	.910	3	1	2	176:54	**14**	0	4.75	.813
PWHL totals			43	25	14	4	2522	89	3	2.12	.919	8	3	5	498	19	2	2.29	.908
