= 2018 NCAA National Collegiate women's ice hockey tournament =

NCAA women's ice hockey postseason tournament

- 2018 Women's Frozen Four logo
- Teams: 8
- Finals site: Ridder Arena, Minneapolis, Minnesota
- Champions: Clarkson Golden Knights (3rd title)
- Runner-up: Colgate Raiders (1st title game)
- Semifinalists: Ohio State Buckeyes (1st Frozen Four); Wisconsin Badgers (11th Frozen Four)
- Winning coach: Matt Desrosiers (3rd title)
- MOP: Shea Tiley (Clarkson)
- Attendance: 6,361, 2,992 for Championship Game

The 2018 NCAA National Collegiate Women's Ice Hockey Tournament involves eight schools in single-elimination play to determine the national champion of women's NCAA Division I college ice hockey. The quarterfinals will be played at the campuses of the seeded teams on Saturday, March 10, 2018. The Frozen Four will be played on March 16 and 18, 2018 at Ridder Arena in Minneapolis, Minnesota. The University of Minnesota will host the tournament. This was the fourth time that Ridder Arena hosted the Frozen Four and the sixth time it was played in Minneapolis. This was the second year that the Big Ten Network aired the Championship Game live and the first year the semifinals were aired live on BTN. Colgate and Ohio State each reached the NCAA tournament for the first time in program history, and each reached the Frozen Four in their maiden appearance. Clarkson defeated the Colgate Raiders 2–1 in the final to win their second straight championship and third championship in the past five seasons.

== Qualifying teams ==
2018 Qualifying Teams
WCHA, ECAC, Hockey East, CHA

In the fourth year under this qualification format, the winners of all four Division I conference tournaments received automatic berths to the NCAA tournament. The other four teams were selected at-large. The top four teams were then seeded and received home ice for the quarterfinals.

Seed	School	Conference	Record	Berth type	Appearance	Last bid
1	Clarkson	ECAC	33–4–1	Tournament champion	7th	2017
2	Wisconsin	WCHA	30–4–2	At-large bid	12th	2017
3	Colgate	ECAC	32–5–1	At-large bid	1st	Never
4	Boston College	Hockey East	30–4–3	At-large bid	10th	2017
	Minnesota	WCHA	24–10–3	Tournament champion	16th	2017
	Ohio State	WCHA	23–10–4	At-large bid	1st	Never
	Northeastern	Hockey East	19–16–3	Tournament champion	2nd	2016
	Mercyhurst	CHA	18–14–4	Tournament champion	12th	2016

== Bracket ==
Quarterfinals held at home sites of seeded teams

National Quarterfinals; March 10
1	Clarkson	2*
Mercyhurst	1
4	Boston College	0
Ohio State	2
2	Wisconsin	4
Minnesota	0
3	Colgate	3
Northeastern	1

National Semifinals; March 16
1	Clarkson	1*
Ohio State	0
2	Wisconsin	3
3	Colgate	4**

National Championship; March 18
1	Clarkson	2*
3	Colgate	1

Championship Game Officials: Referee Scott Roth, Shane Paskey Linesmen: Mike Mueller, Glendon Seal

Note: * denotes overtime period(s)

== Results ==
=== National Quarterfinals ===
==== (1) Clarkson vs. Mercyhurst ====
March 10; 2:00	Mercyhurst	1–2 (OT) (0–0, 1–0, 0–1, 0–1)	Clarkson	Cheel Arena; Attendance: 1,383

Game reference

Kennedy Blair
Goalies
Shea Tiley
Referees:
Christopher Leavitt
MacKenzie Williams
Linesmen:
John Mulroy
Timothy Daley

Hartwick (Blasen, Nuutinen) – 39:39	1–0
	1–1	45:30 – pp – Pejzlová (Harmon, Gabel)
	1–2	76:52 – Giguère (Pejzlova, Harmon)

10 min
Penalties
6 min
28
Shots
32

==== (4) Boston College vs. Ohio State ====
March 10; 2:00	Ohio State	2–0 (0–0, 1–0, 1–0)	Boston College	Conte Forum; Attendance: 796

Game reference
Kassidy Sauvé	Goalies	Kaitlin Burt	Referees: Katie Guay; Derek Zuckerman; Linesmen: Ryan Belhumeur; Ryan Chauvin
Boyle (Iafallo, Sadek) – pp – 30:12 / 1–0; Field (Iafallo) – 55:43 / 2–0			Referees: Katie Guay; Derek Zuckerman; Linesmen: Ryan Belhumeur; Ryan Chauvin
10 min	Penalties	10 min	Referees: Katie Guay; Derek Zuckerman; Linesmen: Ryan Belhumeur; Ryan Chauvin
41	Shots	38	Referees: Katie Guay; Derek Zuckerman; Linesmen: Ryan Belhumeur; Ryan Chauvin

==== (2) Wisconsin vs. Minnesota ====
March 10; 2:07	Minnesota	0–4 (0–1, 0–2, 0–1)	Wisconsin	LaBahn Arena; Attendance: 2,423

Game reference

Sidney Peters
Goalies
Kristen Campbell
Referees:
Scott Roth
Robert Ludwig
Linesmen:
Glendon Seal
Mike Mueller

0–1	10:08 – Norby
0–2	26:20 – Roque (Rowe, Wellhausen)
0–3	26:36 – Roque
0–4	58:09 – pp – Kepler (Roque, Cogan)

8 min
Penalties
4 min
12
Shots
39

==== (3) Colgate vs. Northeastern ====
March 10; 3:05	Northeastern	1–3 (0–0, 1–1, 0–2)	Colgate	Class of 1965 Arena; Attendance: 1,373

Game reference

Aerin Frankel
Goalies
Julia Vandyk
Referees:
Chris Katyl
Todd Plouffe
Linesmen:
Jodi Place
Mike Bontatibus

	0–1	29:07 – pp – Wilson-Bennett (Zafuto, Eldridge)
Renner (Kelly, Hartman) – 31:24	1–1
	1–2	41:37 – Zafuto (Perry)
	1–3	59:10 – Larson

12 min
Penalties
6 min
24
Shots
36

=== National Semifinals ===
==== (1) Clarkson vs. Ohio State ====
March 16; 4:03	Ohio State	0–1 (OT) (0–0, 0–0, 0–0, 0–1)	Clarkson	Ridder Arena

Game reference
Kassidy Sauvé	Goalies	Shea Tiley	Referees: Chris Katyl; Todd Plouffe; Linesmen: Mike Bontatibus; Jodi Price
0–1 / 76:12 – Gabel (Giguère, Pejzliva)			Referees: Chris Katyl; Todd Plouffe; Linesmen: Mike Bontatibus; Jodi Price
8 min	Penalties	4 min	Referees: Chris Katyl; Todd Plouffe; Linesmen: Mike Bontatibus; Jodi Price
41	Shots	34	Referees: Chris Katyl; Todd Plouffe; Linesmen: Mike Bontatibus; Jodi Price

==== (2) Wisconsin vs. (3) Colgate ====
March 16; 7:51	Colgate	4–3 (2OT) (1–0, 1–1, 1–2, 0–0, 1–0)	Wisconsin	Ridder Arena; Attendance: 3,369

Game reference

Julia Vandyk
Goalies
Kristen Campbell
Referees:
Chris Leavitt
MacKenzie Williams
Linesmen:
Timothy Daley
John Mulroy

Wilson-Bennett (Zafuto, Sullivan) – 16:43	1–0
	1–1	26:22 Wellhausen (Roque)
Wilson-Bennett (Sullivan, Eldridge) – pp – 39:30	2–1
	2–2	46:37 – pp – Kepler (Rolfes, Cogan)
Eldridge (Wilson-Bennett, Zafuto) – pp – 54:13	3–2
	3–3	56:36 – Steffen (Bowlby, Norby)
Wilson-Bennett (Perry, Wildfang) – pp – 96:03	4–3

8 min
Penalties
6 min
24
Shots
48

=== National Championship ===
==== (1) Clarkson vs. (3) Colgate ====
March 18; 2:03	Colgate	1–2 (OT) (0–1, 1–0, 0–0, 0–1)	Clarkson	Ridder Arena; Attendance: 2,992

Game reference

Julia Vandyk
Goalies
Shea Tiley
Referees:
Scott Roth
Robert Ludwig
Linesmen:
Mike Mueller
Glendon Seal

	0–1	16:29 – Vinkle (Mariani)
Schneider (Zafuto, Wilson-Bennett)	1–1
	1–2	67:55 – Giguère

8 min
Penalties
6 min
28
Shots
37

== Media ==
=== Television ===
Big Ten Network televised the semifinals and championship during their multi-year contract to carry the event.

==== Broadcast assignments ====
Women's Frozen Four and Championship

- Dan Kelly, Sonny Watrous, and Allison Hayes (BTN)

== Tournament awards ==
=== All-Tournament Team ===
- G: Shea Tiley*, Clarkson
- D: Savannah Harmon, Clarkson
- D: Olivia Zafuto, Colgate
- F: Loren Gabel, Clarkson
- F: Élizabeth Giguère, Clarkson
- F: Breanne Wilson-Bennett, Colgate

* Most Outstanding Player
