= Sophia Kunin =

American ice hockey player (born 1997)

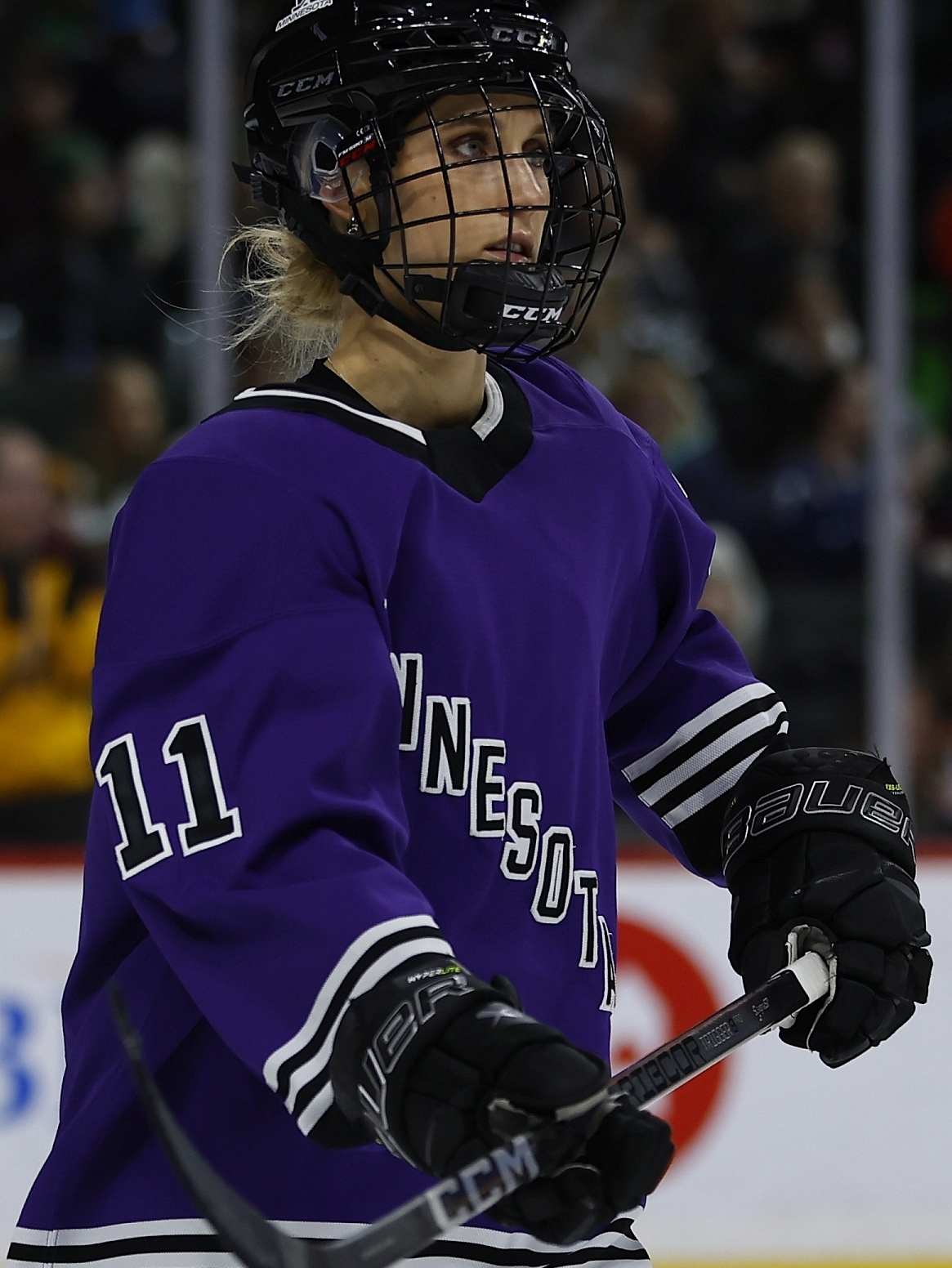
- Kunin with PWHL Minnesota in 2024
- Born: April 3, 1997 (age 29) Wayzata, Minnesota, U.S.
- Height: 5 ft 10 in (178 cm)
- Weight: 150 lb (68 kg; 10 st 10 lb)
- Position: Forward
- Shot: Right
- Played for: PWHPA; PWHL Minnesota
- Playing career: 2019–2024
Medal record
World U18 Championship
Gold medal – first place	2015 United States

Sophia Kunin (née Shaver; born April 3, 1997) is an American former ice hockey forward. She played professionally in the PWHPA and in the Professional Women's Hockey League (PWHL) for the Minnesota Frost. She is known for her versatility, and is able to play the positions of center, winger, and defense.

== Early life ==
Kunin was born Sophie Shaver on April 3, 1997, in Wayzata, Minnesota, as one of Tom and Cristen Shaver's three children. A graduate of Wayzata High School, Kunin had 25 points in 19 games her senior year and was a finalist for the Minnesota Ms. Hockey award.

== Playing career ==
=== NCAA ===
From 2015 to 2019, she played for the Wisconsin Badgers women's ice hockey program. She served as an alternate captain in her junior year. As a senior during the 2018–19 season, she was named team captain. Under her leadership, the Badgers advanced to the 2019 NCAA National Collegiate women's ice hockey tournament finals, where she scored the game-winning goal to win the national championship.

=== PWHPA ===
In 2019 she joined the Professional Women's Hockey Players Association. She played for Minnesota in the PWHPA from 2020 to 2022. As part of an ongoing partnership between the ECHL, PWHPA, and PHF, she was nominated to be one of four women to play at the 2022 ECHL All-star Classic.

During the 2022–23 season, she won the PWHPA Secret Cup with Team Harvey.

=== PWHL ===
On September 18, 2023, she was drafted in the 10th round, 60th overall, by PWHL Minnesota in the 2023 PWHL Draft. On December 1, 2023, she signed a one-year contract with Minnesota. She later expressed appreciation for the opportunity to play in her hometown and stated that she looked forward to the upcoming season.

She scored a goal in her PWHL debut game. The team went on to win their first game 3–2. Kunin announced her retirement from professional ice hockey on June 17, 2024.

== International play ==
Kunin was invited to the United States women's national ice hockey team training camp in 2014. She represented the United States at the 2015 IIHF World Women's U18 Championship where she recorded one goal and two assists in five games and won a gold medal.

== Personal life ==
At the University of Wisconsin, she majored in Real Estate and Urban Land Economics.

Sophia Kunin married National Hockey League player Luke Kunin in 2023.

== Career statistics ==
Note: GP = Games played; G = Goals; A = Assists; Pts = Points; PIM = Penalty minutes;

			Regular season					Playoffs
Season	Team	League	GP	G	A	Pts	PIM	GP	G	A	Pts	PIM
2015–16	Wisconsin Badgers	WCHA	40	7	10	17	4	—	—	—	—	—
2016–17	Wisconsin Badgers	WCHA	38	3	15	18	4	—	—	—	—	—
2017–18	Wisconsin Badgers	WCHA	35	12	12	24	6	—	—	—	—	—
2018–19	Wisconsin Badgers	WCHA	41	7	14	21	6	—	—	—	—	—
2019–20	Independent	PWHPA	–	–	–	—	–	—	—	—	—	—
2020–21	Minnesota	PWHPA	6	0	3	3	0	—	—	—	—	—
2021–22	Minnesota	PWHPA	7	3	3	6	0	—	—	—	—	—
2022–23	Team Harvey's	PWHPA	20	3	6	9	0	—	—	—	—	—
2023–24	PWHL Minnesota	PWHL	24	2	1	3	6	10	1	0	1	2
PWHPA totals			20	3	6	9	0	—	—	—	—	—
PWHL totals			24	2	1	3	6	10	1	0	1	2

== Awards and honors ==
=== NCAA Awards ===
Award	Period
WCHA All-Academic Team	2016–17, 2017–18
Academic All-Big Ten Team	2016–17
WCHA Rookie of the Week	Feb 16, March 8, 2016
All-WCHA Second Team	2017–18

=== Other awards ===
- Presidential Academic Award
- Minnesota Ms. Hockey – Finalist
