= Samantha Cogan =

Canadian ice hockey player (born 1997)

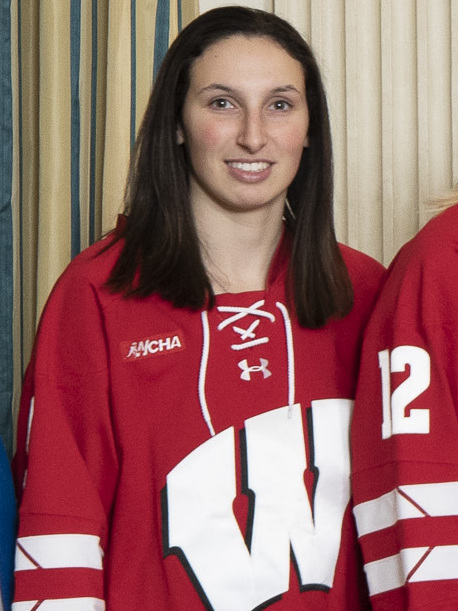
- Cogan in 2019
- Born: July 7, 1997 (age 29) Ottawa, Ontario, Canada
- Height: 5 ft 8 in (173 cm)
- Weight: 154 lb (70 kg; 11 st 0 lb)
- Position: Forward
- Shoots: Left
- team Former teams: Minnesota Frost (PWHL): SDE HF (SDHL); Toronto Sceptres (PWHL); Team Sonnet (PWHPA); Team Scotiabank (PWHPA); KRS Vanke Rays
- Coached for: Calgary Dinos
- Playing career: 2011–present
- Coaching career: 2021–present

Samantha "Sam" Cogan (born July 7, 1997) is a Canadian professional ice hockey player who is a forward for the Minnesota Frost of the Professional Women's Hockey League (PWHL). She previously played for SDE HF of the 26 Swedish Women's Hockey League (SDHL). She played college ice hockey at Wisconsin and won a national title with the team in 2019.

== Playing career ==
Cogan first started playing hockey at six years old. Her father was initially apprehensive about her playing hockey but her mother and friends convinced him to let her play the sport.

=== Junior ===
Cogan began her junior career in the Provincial Women's Hockey League (PWHL or Provincial WHL; renamed Ontario Women's Hockey League in 2023) playing for the Nepean Wildcats in her home city of Ottawa, Ontario. She spent four seasons with the team, from 2011 to 2015, and in her final season was named alternate captain and helped lead the team to their first regular season championship. Cogan was the team's leading scorer in her second season and was a top-three point and goal scorer during her other three seasons.

=== NCAA ===
Cogan's time in the NCAA Division I was spent representing the Wisconsin Badgers in the Western Collegiate Hockey Association (WCHA) from 2015 to 2019, as she majored in physical education. In her rookie season, Cogan led her rookie teammates in goals, assists, and points. She was also the runner up in the same three categories across all WCHA freshmen. Cogan's standout rookie season secured her a spot on the 20015–16 WCHA All-Rookie Team and awarded her WCHA Rookie of the Month twice in 2015–16, and WCHA Rookie of the Week on three occasions in 2015–16. She was named WCHA Offensive Player of the Week once in 2018, and to the 2017–18 WCHA All-Academic Team.

In her senior year, Cogan helped lead the team to the 2019 NCAA National Collegiate women's ice hockey tournament national championship. She recorded 100 career points, joining only 25 other Badgers in obtaining that achievement.

=== Professional ===
Cogan joined the Professional Women's Hockey Players Association (PWHPA) in 2020 and played for Calgary-based Team Scotiabank until 2022, at which time she switched teams and spent the 2022–23 season with Toronto-based Team Sonnet. In her first season with Team Scotiabank, Cogan was selected as a PWHPA All-Star, and her second season with the team was victorious, making Team Scotiabank PWHPA Champions.

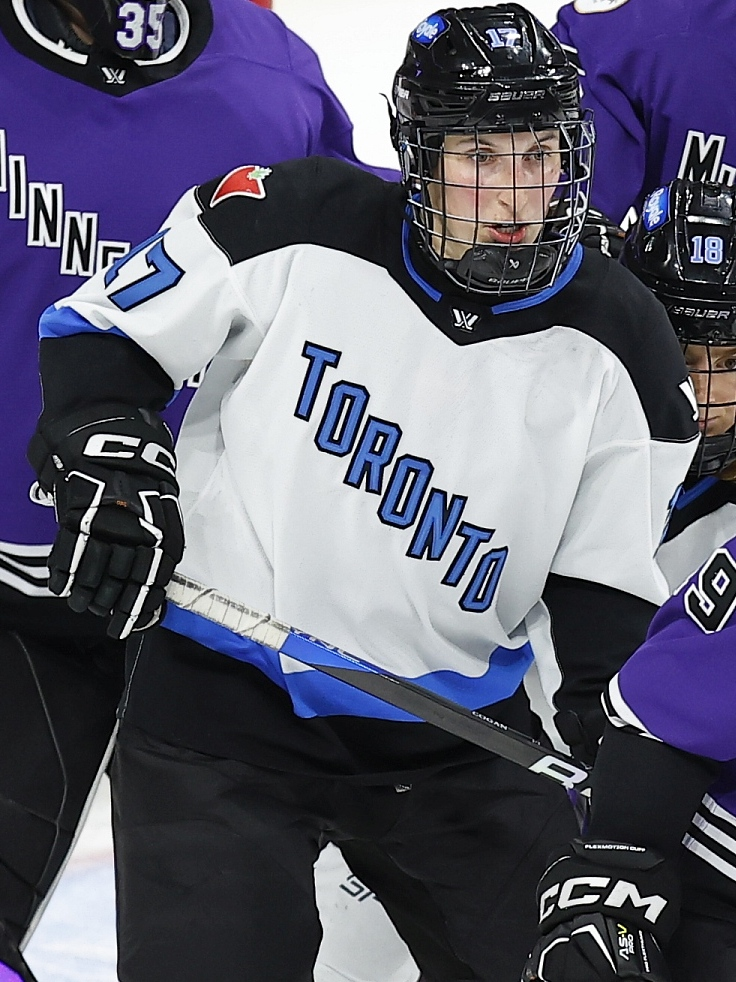
Cogan with Toronto in 2024

In 2023, the Professional Women's Hockey League announced its inaugural season. Cogan was noted as a player to watch ahead of the 2023 PWHL Draft but, to her own surprise, was not selected during the draft. She was invited to PWHL Toronto's preseason training camp and signed with the team as a free agent.

On March 2, 2024, she scored her first PWHL goal against her hometown team in a 5–2 PWHL Toronto win over PWHL Ottawa.

The newly renamed Toronto Sceptres signed Cogan as a reserve player prior to the 2024–25 season. Cogan was released from her reserve contract on February 11, 2025, becoming a free agent.

Cogan began the 2025–26 with SDE Hockey of the SDHL where she recorded 39 points in 33 regular season games. On March 26, 2026, she signed a reserve player contract with the Minnesota Frost. On June 20, 2026, she signed a two-year contract extension with the Frost.

== International play ==
As a junior player with the Canadian national under-18 ice hockey team, Cogan participated in the IIHF U18 Women's World Championships in 2014 and 2015, winning gold and silver medals, respectively. Her performance in the 2014 championship awarded her an opportunity to be a part of the Canadian National Team Fall Festival.

== Personal life ==
Cogan was born and raised in Ottawa, Ontario, Canada, to Don and Heather Cogan, and is Jewish. She has a sister, Casey, and a brother, Tyler. She attended Glebe Collegiate Institute for high school, where she was on the honor roll for three years.

She served as an assistant coach to the Calgary Dinos women's ice hockey program during the 2021–22 season of U Sports women's ice hockey. The Dinos coaching team in that season was led by head coach Carla MacLeod and Kelty Apperson was an assistant coach alongside Cogan.

Cogan resided in Calgary during 2020 to 2023.

== Awards and honours ==
| Award | Year or period |
International
| World U18 Gold Medal | 2014 |
| World U18 Silver Medal | 2015 |
College
| WCHA Rookie of the Week | Week of November 3, 2015 |
| WCHA Rookie of the Week | Week of December 8, 2015 |
| WCHA Rookie of the Week | Week of February 10, 2016 |
| WCHA Rookie of the Month | December 2015 |
| WCHA Rookie of the Month | February 2016 |
| WCHA All-Rookie Team | 2015–16 |
| WCHA Offensive Player of the Week | Week of February 20, 2018 |
| NCAA Tournament Champion | 2019 |
PWHPA
| All-Star Game | 2022–23 |
Other
| Sharon Koffman Memorial Athletic Award bestowed by the Ottawa Jewish Sports Hall of Fame | 2017 |

== See also ==
- List of select Jewish ice hockey players
