= Tori Sullivan =

American ice hockey player (born 1996)

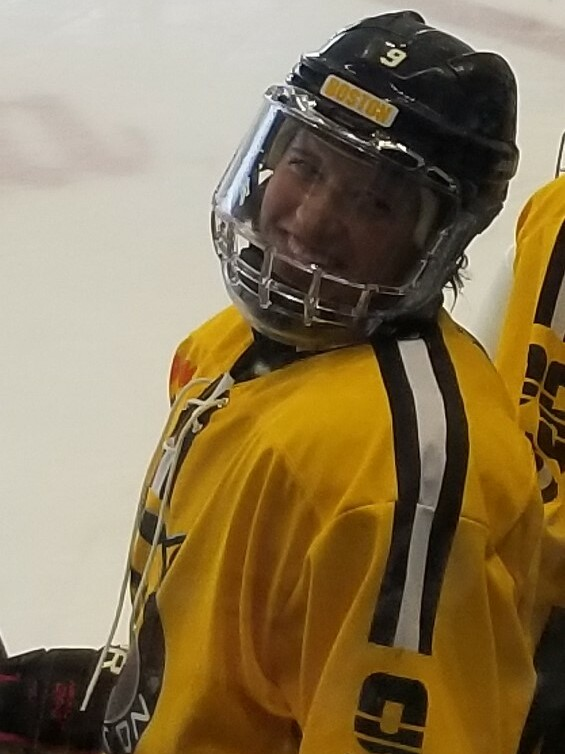
- Tori Sullivan playing for the Boston Pride 10-13-2019
- Born: August 4, 1996 (age 29) West Bloomfield, Michigan, US
- Position: Forward
- Shoots: Right
- PHF team Former teams: Connecticut Whale; Northeastern Huskies; Boston College Eagles; Boston Pride
- National team: United States
- Playing career: 2014–present

Victoria Rose "Tori" Sullivan (born August 4, 1996) is an American former ice hockey forward who played with the Connecticut Whale of the now defunct Premier Hockey Federation (PHF).

== Playing career ==
During high school, she played for the HoneyBaked Hockey Club in her home state of Michigan, winning three state championships.

In 2014, she began attending Boston College and playing college ice hockey with the Boston College Eagles women's team in the Hockey East conference of the NCAA Division I. She scored 28 points in 39 games in her rookie collegiate season, being named to the Hockey East All-Rookie Team. She missed all but two games during the 2016–17 season, however, being redshirted due to injury. In 2017, she transferred to Northeastern University, and would spend the last two years of her collegiate eligibility with the Northeastern Huskies, finishing her college career with 98 points in 154 games. Sullivan won the Hockey East championship with Northeastern in 2019.

After graduating, she signed her first professional contract with the Boston Pride of the NWHL; a one-year, $5000 contract, becoming the second player to sign with the Pride in the 2019 off-season. She scored 25 points in 24 games in her rookie season, good for thirteenth in the league. She also tied for first in the league in powerplay goals, and the Pride qualified for the Isobel Cup finals before the season was cancelled due to the COVID-19 pandemic in the United States. During the season, she was also noted for her social media work managing the team's TikTok account with teammate Christina Putigna.

She re-signed with the Pride for the 2020–21 NWHL season, with Pride general manager Karilyn Pilch stating that "if the NWHL had an award for Best Dangles, Tori would win unanimously."

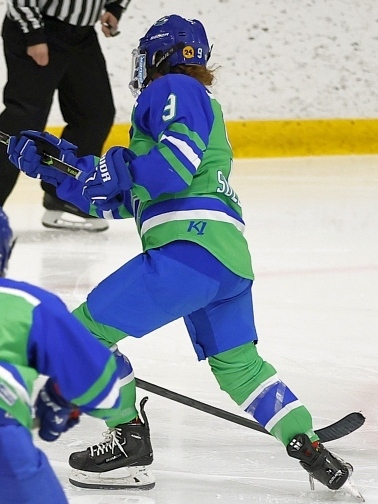
Sullivan with the Whale in 2023

She signed to the Connecticut Whale for the 2022–2023 season

== International career ==
Sullivan represented the United States at the 2014 IIHF World Women's U18 Championship in Hungary, notching one goal in five games as the country won silver.

== Personal life ==
Sullivan has a degree in behavioral neuroscience from Northeastern University. She previously attended Mercy High School in Farmington Hills, Michigan.

== Career stats ==
			Regular Season					Playoffs
Season	Team	League	GP	G	A	Pts	PIM	GP	G	A	Pts	PIM
2014–15	Boston College Eagles	NCAA	39	11	17	28	4	–	–	–	–	–
2015–16	Boston College Eagles	NCAA	40	9	17	26	29	–	–	–	–	–
2016–17	Boston College Eagles	NCAA	2	0	1	1	2	–	–	–	–	–
2017–18	Northeastern Huskies	NCAA	37	10	13	23	12	–	–	–	–	–
2018–19	Northeastern Huskies	NCAA	36	6	14	20	29	–	–	–	–	–
2019–20	Boston Pride	NWHL	24	11	14	25	8	1	0	0	0	0
2020–21	Boston Pride	NWHL	7	0	2	2	0
NCAA totals			154	36	62	98	78	–	–	–	–	–
NWHL totals			31	11	16	27	8	1	0	0	0	0

== Honors ==
- Week of November 3, 2014 Pro Ambitions/WHEA Rookie of the Week
- 2014–15 Hockey East All-Rookie Team
- 2014–15 Boston College Athletic Director's Award for Academic Achievement
- 2014–15 Hockey East All-Academic Team
- 2015–16 Boston College Athletic Director's Award for Academic Achievement
- 2015–16 Hockey East All-Academic Team
- 2018–19 Hockey East All-Academic Team
