= 2019 NCAA National Collegiate women's ice hockey tournament =

NCAA women's ice hockey postseason tournament

- 2019 Women's Frozen Four logo
- Teams: 8
- Finals site: People's United Center, Hamden, Connecticut
- Champions: Wisconsin Badgers (5th title)
- Runner-up: Minnesota Golden Gophers (9th title game)
- Semifinalists: Clarkson Golden Knights (5th Frozen Four); Cornell Big Red (4th Frozen Four)
- Winning coach: Mark Johnson (5th title)
- MOP: Kristen Campbell (Wisconsin)
- Attendance: 6,664, 3,423 for Championship Game

The 2019 NCAA National Collegiate Women's Ice Hockey Tournament involved eight schools in single-elimination play to determine the national champion of women's NCAA Division I college ice hockey. The quarterfinals was played at the campuses of the seeded teams on Saturday, March 16, 2019. The Frozen Four was played on March 22 and 24, 2019 at People's United Center in Hamden, Connecticut. Quinnipiac University hosted the tournament, the second time that it and People's United Center hosted the Frozen Four. It was the third year that the Big Ten Network aired the championship game live and the second year the semifinals was aired live on BTN. Syracuse made the NCAA tournament for the first time in program history. The Wisconsin Badgers defeated the Minnesota Golden Gophers 2–0 for their fifth championship in program history.

== Qualifying teams ==
2019 Qualifying Teams
WCHA, ECAC, Hockey East, CHA

In the fifth year under this qualification format, the winners of all four Division I conference tournaments received automatic berths to the NCAA tournament. The other four teams were selected at-large. The top four teams were then seeded and received home ice for the quarterfinals.

Seed	School	Conference	Record	Berth type	Appearance	Last bid
1	Wisconsin	WCHA	32–4–2	Tournament champion	13th	2018
2	Minnesota	WCHA	30–5–1	At-large bid	17th	2018
3	Northeastern	Hockey East	27–5–5	Tournament champion	3rd	2018
4	Clarkson	ECAC	29–7–2	Tournament champion	8th	2018
	Boston College	Hockey East	26–11–1	At-large bid	11th	2018
	Cornell	ECAC	23–5–6	At-large bid	7th	2017
	Princeton	ECAC	20–7–5	At-large bid	3rd	2016
	Syracuse	CHA	13–21–3	Tournament champion	1st	Never

== Bracket ==
Quarterfinals held at home sites of seeded teams

National Quarterfinals; March 16
1	Wisconsin	4
Syracuse	0
4	Clarkson	2*
Boston College	1
2	Minnesota	5
Princeton	2
3	Northeastern	2
Cornell	3*

National Semifinals; March 22
1	Wisconsin	5
4	Clarkson	0
2	Minnesota	2
Cornell	0

National Championship; March 24
1	Wisconsin	2
2	Minnesota	0

Note: * denotes overtime period(s)

== Results ==
=== National Quarterfinals ===
==== Syracuse vs. (1) Wisconsin ====
March 16; 2:07	Syracuse	0–4 (0–0, 0–2, 0–2)	Wisconsin	LaBahn Arena; Attendance: 2,423

Game reference

Ady Cohen
Goalies
Kristen Campbell
Referees:
Katie Guay
Kelly Cooke
Linesmen:
Delaney Harrop
Amanda Frederickson

0–1	22:33 – Pankowski (Clark, Mauermann)
0–2	32:19 – Pankowski (Clark)
0–3	42:16 – Roque
0–4	52:19 – Norby (Shaver, Rowe)

2 min
Penalties
6 min
15
Shots
47

==== Boston College vs. (4) Clarkson ====
March 16; 3:00	Boston College	1–2 (OT) (1–0, 0–0, 0–1, 0–1)	Clarkson	Cheel Arena; Attendance: 977

Game reference

Maddy MCArthur
Goalies
Kassidy Sauvé
Referees:
Todd Plouffe
CJ Hallman
Linesmen:
Brian Kimmins
Kyle Walsh

Watts (Sommerfield) – 13:24	1–0
	1–1	56:57 – Pozzebon (Vinkle)
	1–2	74:38 – Giguère (Pejzlová, Keenan)

6 min
Penalties
2 min
36
Shots
30

==== Princeton vs. (2) Minnesota ====
March 16	Princeton	2–5 (1–2, 1–0, 0–3)	Minnesota	Ridder Arena; Attendance: 2,079

Game reference

Stephanie Neatby
Goalies
Sydney Scobee

Fillier (Connors) – 5:26	1–0
	1–1	7:12 – S. Potomak (A. Potomak, Pannek)
	1–2	18:05 – A. Potomak (Pannek, S. Potomak)
Fillier (Bullock, Keopple) – 22:43	2–2
	2–3	51:47 – Pannek (S. Potomak)
	2–4	58:54 – S. Potomak
	2–5	59:46 – Schammel (Williamson)

0 min
Penalties
2 min
26
Shots
39

==== Cornell vs. (3) Northeastern ====
March 16; 1:00	Cornell	3–2 (OT) (2–0, 0–0, 0–2, 1–0)	Northeastern	Matthews Arena; Attendance: 1,401

Game reference

Marlène Boissonnault
Goalies
Aerin Frankel
Referees:
Tom Quinn
Mackenzie Welter
Linesmen:
John Mulroy
Timothy Daley

Curlew (O'Neill, Graham) – 13:28	1–0
Graham (Facchinato, Slobodzian) – pp – 19:28	2–0
	2–1	49:32 – Pettey (Renner)
	2–2	54:31 – Fontaine (Sullivan, Hobson)
Frechette (Buckley, Facchinato)	3–2

10 min
Penalties
4 min
28
Shots
24

=== National Semifinals ===
==== Cornell vs. (2) Minnesota ====
March 22; 4:01	Cornell	0–2 (0–0, 0–1, 0–1)	Minnesota	People's United Center; Attendance: 3,241

Game reference
Marlène Boissonnault	Goalies	Alex Gulstene	Referees: Todd Plouffe; CJ Hallman; Linesmen: Kyle Walsh; Brian Kimmins
0–1 / 32:09 – pp – Schammel (Oden, Knowles); 0–2 / 59:27 – Potomak			Referees: Todd Plouffe; CJ Hallman; Linesmen: Kyle Walsh; Brian Kimmins
4 min	Penalties	4 min	Referees: Todd Plouffe; CJ Hallman; Linesmen: Kyle Walsh; Brian Kimmins
15	Shots	27	Referees: Todd Plouffe; CJ Hallman; Linesmen: Kyle Walsh; Brian Kimmins

==== (4) Clarkson vs. (1) Wisconsin ====
March 22; 7:08	Clarkson	0–5 (0–0, 0–1, 0–4)	Wisconsin	People's United Center; Attendance: 3,241

Game reference

Kassidy Sauvé
Goalies
Kristen Campbell
Referee:
Tom Quinn
Linesmen:
MacKenzie Welter
John Mulroy

0–1	29:29 – Roque (Curl, Buchbinder)
0–2	50:52 – Cogan (Gardner, Clark)
0–3	53:47 – Pankowski (Cogan)
0–4	58:40 – Pankowski (Cogan)
0–5	59:05 – Norby (Shaver, Schneider)

2 min
Penalties
8 min
14
Shots
40

=== National Championship ===
==== (2) Minnesota vs. (1) Wisconsin ====
March 24; 2:31	Minnesota	0–2 (0–1, 0–1, 0–0)	Wisconsin	People's United Center; Attendance: 3,423

Game reference
Alex Gulstene	Goalies	Kristen Campbell	Referees: Katie Guay; Kelly Cooke; Linesmen: Amanda Tassoni; Delaney Harrop
0–1 / 10:20 – Shaver (Norby, LaMantia); 0–2 / 29:15 – Pankowski (Roque)			Referees: Katie Guay; Kelly Cooke; Linesmen: Amanda Tassoni; Delaney Harrop
2 min	Penalties	4 min	Referees: Katie Guay; Kelly Cooke; Linesmen: Amanda Tassoni; Delaney Harrop
27	Shots	32	Referees: Katie Guay; Kelly Cooke; Linesmen: Amanda Tassoni; Delaney Harrop

== Media ==
=== Television ===
Big Ten Network televised the semifinals and championship during their multi-year contract to carry the event. It would end up being the last time they carried the event as the 2020 tournament would go on to be canceled, and ESPN would purchase the rights beginning with 2021.

==== Broadcast assignments ====
Women's Frozen Four and Championship

- Chris Vosters, Sonny Watrous, and Margaux Farrell (BTN)

== Tournament awards ==
=== All-Tournament Team ===
- G: Kristen Campbell*, Wisconsin
- D: Maddie Rolfes, Wisconsin
- D: Mekenzie Steffen, Wisconsin
- F: Annie Pankowski, Wisconsin
- F: Abby Roque, Wisconsin
- F: Nicole Schammel, Minnesota

* Most Outstanding Player
