= NCAA women's ice hockey tournament =

US collegiate championship

- Sport: College ice hockey
- Number of teams: 11
- Format: Single-elimination tournament
- Current stadium: Pegula Ice Arena
- Current location: University Park, Pennsylvania
- Played: 2001–present
- Last contest: 2026
- Current champion: Wisconsin Badgers (9th title)
- Most championships: Wisconsin Badgers (9)
- TV partner: ESPNU
- Official website: ncaa.com/sports/icehockey-women/nc

The annual NCAA women's ice hockey tournament—officially known as the National Collegiate Women's Ice Hockey Championship—is a college ice hockey tournament held in the United States by the National Collegiate Athletic Association to determine the top women's team in the NCAA.

Unlike most NCAA sports, women's ice hockey uses a modified version of the National Collegiate championship format, which means Division I and Division II teams compete against each other in the same tournament.

The semifinals and championship game of the tournament are branded as the women's "Frozen Four", a reference to the NCAA's long-time branding of its basketball semi-finals as the "Final Four".

== Origins ==
The NCAA championship of women's ice hockey began in 2001, although several universities had had women's teams established since the early 1970s.

In 1965, the first collegiate women's ice hockey team in the United States was created at Brown University. In February 1966, the team, named the "Pembroke Pandas", played its first match. Their opponents were the Walpole Brooms, a non-collegiate team. The women's ice hockey program of Cornell University began in 1971. The Big Red team competed in its first match in 1972, which it won 4–3, against Scarborough. In 1972, they played eight matches and lost half, including two defeats against the Pembroke Pandas. Yale University made its debut in women's hockey on December 9, 1975. The University of Minnesota Duluth, the University of New Hampshire, and the rest of the Ivy League schools have similar histories.

In 1976, Brown University would host the first ever Ivy League women's ice hockey tournament. Competitors in the tournament included Princeton, Yale, and Cornell, which won the tournament. Women's ice hockey continued growth and acceptance continued through the early 1980s. In 1984, the Providence Friars won the inaugural ECAC women's ice hockey championship.

In the 1997–98 season, the American Women's College Hockey Alliance (AWCHA) made its debut. It was financed by the United States Olympic Committee. This allowed for the first national women's ice hockey championship to occur, which was won by New Hampshire. The 1997–98 season also saw the creation of the Patty Kazmaier Award, designed to recognize the most remarkable women's collegiate ice hockey player every season. The AWCHA also conducted championships in 1999 and 2000, which were won by Harvard and Minnesota respectively.

During the 1999–2000 season, WCHA joined the ECAC in an attempt to make women's ice hockey an NCAA sanctioned sport. In August 2000, the NCAA announced that it would set up a national division of women's ice hockey with a national championship at the end of every season, starting with the 2000–01 season. The Minnesota Duluth Bulldogs won the inaugural tournament defeating the St. Lawrence Skating Saints 4–2 in the championship game.

== NCAA Division I women's ice hockey ==
In all, 44 schools in the United States, ranging from the Midwest to the East Coast, sponsor varsity women's hockey at the National Collegiate (Divisions I and II) level. Five National Collegiate conferences are currently recognized by the NCAA—Atlantic Hockey America, ECAC Hockey, Hockey East, New England Women's Hockey Alliance, and the Western Collegiate Hockey Association.

== Format ==
Under NCAA rules, Division II schools are allowed to compete as Division I members in sports in which a D-II championship is not contested. As there is no Division II championship for women's ice hockey, this rule applies to the tournament. The official name of the "Division I" tournament is the National Collegiate Women's Ice Hockey Championship, which reflects the NCAA's formal terminology for championship events that are open to schools from multiple divisions.

This tournament is a single elimination competition of eleven teams. The semi-finals and final are called the "Women's Frozen Four." This moniker is similar to the name used by the NCAA Men's Ice Hockey Championship. The term is derived from the term "Final four."

The Patty Kazmaier Award ceremony takes place annually during Women's Frozen Four weekend.

== History ==
Although many schools from many conferences have been competitive, the first 13 championships were won by only three different schools all originating from the WCHA: Minnesota Duluth, Minnesota, and Wisconsin. In 2014, the WCHA's hold on the championship was finally broken when Clarkson defeated Minnesota. In 2022, Ohio State won the national championship, making them the 4th WCHA team to win. The ECAC, from which Clarkson originated, has easily been the second most competitive conference, with eleven appearances in ten national title games, including the first five games. Hockey East has had four title game appearances, twice by Boston University and once each by Boston College and Northeastern. Atlantic Hockey America played its first season in 2024–25; its women's predecessor, CHA, had one title game appearance, by Mercyhurst in 2009. The 2020 championship was canceled due to the COVID-19 pandemic.

Year	Champion	Coach	Score	Runner-up	Coach	City	Arena
2001	Minnesota Duluth	Shannon Miller	4–2	St. Lawrence	Paul Flanagan	Minneapolis, MN	Mariucci Arena
2002	Minnesota Duluth (2)	Shannon Miller	3–2	Brown	Digit Murphy	Durham, NH	Whittemore Center
2003	Minnesota Duluth (3)	Shannon Miller	4–3 (2OT)	Harvard	Katey Stone	Duluth, MN	DECC Arena
2004	Minnesota	Laura Halldorson	6–2	Harvard	Katey Stone	Providence, RI	Dunkin' Donuts Center
2005	Minnesota (2)	Laura Halldorson	4–3	Harvard	Katey Stone	Durham, NH	Whittemore Center
2006	Wisconsin	Mark Johnson	3–0	Minnesota	Laura Halldorson	Minneapolis, MN	Mariucci Arena
2007	Wisconsin (2)	Mark Johnson	4–1	Minnesota Duluth	Shannon Miller	Lake Placid, NY	Herb Brooks Arena
2008	Minnesota Duluth (4)	Shannon Miller	4–0	Wisconsin	Mark Johnson	Duluth, MN	DECC Arena
2009	Wisconsin (3)	Mark Johnson	5–0	Mercyhurst	Michael Sisti	Boston, MA	Agganis Arena
2010	Minnesota Duluth (5)	Shannon Miller	3–2 (3OT)	Cornell	Doug Derraugh	Minneapolis, MN	Ridder Arena
2011	Wisconsin (4)	Mark Johnson	4–1	Boston University	Brian Durocher	Erie, PA	Tullio Arena
2012	Minnesota (3)	Brad Frost	4–2	Wisconsin	Mark Johnson	Duluth, MN	AMSOIL Arena
2013	Minnesota (4)	Brad Frost	6–3	Boston University	Brian Durocher	Minneapolis, MN	Ridder Arena
2014	Clarkson	Shannon & Matt Desrosiers	5–4	Minnesota	Brad Frost	Hamden, CT	People's United Center
2015	Minnesota (5)	Brad Frost	4–1	Harvard	Katey Stone	Minneapolis, MN	Ridder Arena
2016	Minnesota (6)	Brad Frost	3–1	Boston College	Katie King-Crowley	Durham, NH	Whittemore Center
2017	Clarkson (2)	Matt Desrosiers	3–0	Wisconsin	Mark Johnson	St. Charles, MO	Family Arena
2018	Clarkson (3)	Matt Desrosiers	2–1 (OT)	Colgate	Greg Fargo	Minneapolis, MN	Ridder Arena
2019	Wisconsin (5)	Mark Johnson	2–0	Minnesota	Brad Frost	Hamden, CT	People's United Center
2020	Not held due to the COVID-19 pandemic					Boston, MA	Agganis Arena
2021	Wisconsin (6)	Mark Johnson	2–1 (OT)	Northeastern	Dave Flint	Erie, PA	Erie Insurance Arena
2022	Ohio State	Nadine Muzerall	3–2	Minnesota Duluth	Maura Crowell	University Park, PA (Note: The arena, which has a University Park mailing address, is physically in College Township.)	Pegula Ice Arena
2023	Wisconsin (7)	Mark Johnson	1–0	Ohio State	Nadine Muzerall	Duluth, MN	AMSOIL Arena
2024	Ohio State (2)	Nadine Muzerall	1–0	Wisconsin	Mark Johnson	Durham, NH	Whittemore Center
2025	Wisconsin (8)	Mark Johnson	4–3 (OT)	Ohio State	Nadine Muzerall	Minneapolis, MN	Ridder Arena
2026	Wisconsin (9)	Mark Johnson	3–2	Ohio State	Nadine Muzerall	University Park, PA	Pegula Ice Arena
2027						Duluth, MN	AMSOIL Arena
2028						Fairfield, CT	Martire Family Arena

== Team titles ==
Schools that have won the NCAA Championship
9, 6, 5, 3, 2

Team	#	Years
Wisconsin	9	2006, 2007, 2009, 2011, 2019, 2021, 2023, 2025, 2026
Minnesota	6	2004, 2005, 2012, 2013, 2015, 2016
Minnesota Duluth	5	2001, 2002, 2003, 2008, 2010
Clarkson	3	2014, 2017, 2018
Ohio State	2	2022, 2024

== Result by school and year ==
- NCAA Division I Women's Hockey Tournament appearances by school

31 teams have appeared in the NCAA Tournament in at least one year starting with 2001 (the initial year that the post-season tournament was under the auspices of the NCAA). The results for all years are shown in this table below.

- CH National Champion
- RU National Runner-up
- F4 Frozen Four
- E8 Quarterfinals (did not exist until 2005)
  - C 8 teams selected in 2020 before the tournament was canceled.
- • First round (did not exist until 2022)

To the left of each result, the team's seed is shown in superscript.

- The top 4 teams seeded, 2001 through 2021, except for 2002 (two 1s and two 2s) and 2005 and 2006 (only the top 2 seeded).
- The top 5 teams seeded, 2022 through present

School	Conference (as of 2026–27)	#	F4	CG	CH	01	02	03	04	05	06	07	08	09	10	11	12	13	14	15	16	17	18	19	~~20~~	21	22	23	24	25	26
Wisconsin	WCHA	20	17	13	9					QF	²CH	¹CH	RU	¹CH		¹CH	¹RU		⁴F4	⁴F4	²F4	¹RU	²F4	¹CH	²C	²CH	QF	CH	²RU	¹CH	²CH
Minnesota	WCHA	23	16	9	6		¹F4	³F4	¹CH	¹CH	RU		⁴QF	²F4	³F4	QF	²CH	¹CH	¹RU	¹CH	³CH	F4	QF	²RU	⁴C		²QF	²F4	⁵QF	⁴F4	⁴QF
Minnesota Duluth	WCHA	17	9	7	5	²CH	¹CH	¹CH		²QF	QF	RU	²CH	F4	²CH	QF						³QF				F4	RU	QF	QF	QF	✖
Clarkson	ECAC	13	6	3	3										QF			QF	³CH	QF	F4	²CH	¹CH	⁴F4	C		✖	✖	⁴F4	QF	
Ohio State	WCHA	8	7	5	2																		F4		C	³F4	¹CH	¹RU	¹CH	²RU	¹RU
Harvard	ECAC	12	6	4	-	³F4		²RU	²RU	RU	QF	QF	¹F4		⁴QF			QF	QF	³RU							✖				
Boston University	Hockey East	7	2	2	-										QF	³RU	QF	³RU	QF	QF										✖	
Boston College	Hockey East	12	7	1	-							F4		QF		⁴F4	⁴F4	⁴F4	QF	²F4	¹RU	⁴F4	⁴QF	QF		QF					
St. Lawrence	ECAC	11	5	1	-	⁴RU			³F4	F4	F4	F4	QF	QF			QF					QF							QF	QF	
Cornell	ECAC	10	5	1	-										RU	²F4	³F4	²QF	²QF			QF		F4	¹C				QF	³F4	
Mercyhurst	AHA	13	4	1	-					QF	QF	²QF	QF	³RU	¹F4	QF	QF	F4	F4		QF		QF		C						
Northeastern	Hockey East	8	4	1	-																QF		QF	³QF	³C	¹RU	³F4	⁵F4			⁵F4
Colgate	ECAC	6	2	1	-																		³RU			⁴QF	⁴QF	³QF	³F4	⁵QF	
Brown	ECAC	1	1	1	-		²RU																								
Dartmouth	ECAC	8	4	-	-	¹F4		⁴F4	⁴F4	F4		³QF	QF	QF		QF															
New Hampshire	Hockey East	5	2	-	-						¹F4	⁴QF	³F4	⁴QF	QF																
Penn State	AHA	4	1	-	-																							✖	✖	✖	³F4
Yale	ECAC	3	1	-	-																						⁵F4	⁴QF			QF
Niagara	defunct	1	1	-	-		²F4																								
Princeton	ECAC	5	-	-	-						QF										QF			QF	C						✖
Quinnipiac	ECAC	5	-	-	-															QF	⁴QF						QF	QF			QF
Providence	Hockey East	2	-	-	-					QF																QF					
North Dakota	defunct	2	-	-	-												QF	QF													
Robert Morris	AHA	2	-	-	-																	QF				QF					
Syracuse	AHA	2	-	-	-																			QF			✖				
UConn	Hockey East	2	-	-	-																								✖		QF
RIT	AHA	1	-	-	-															QF											
LIU	NEWHA	1	-	-	-																							✖			
Stonehill	NEWHA	1	-	-	-																								✖		
Sacred Heart	NEWHA	1	-	-	-																									✖	
Franklin Pierce	NEWHA	1	-	-	-																										✖

== Broadcasting ==
In February 2017, the NCAA announced that it had reached a four-year deal with Big Ten Network to televise the Women's national championship game beginning in 2017, and the Frozen Four semi-finals beginning in 2018.

In 2021, ESPN announced that it had acquired the rights under a multi-year deal, with ESPNU to air one semi-final and the national championship annually. The other semi-final will be carried via streaming.

Year	Network	Play-by-play	Analyst	Sideline
2010	CBS College Sports	Dave Ryan	Angela Ruggiero	
2011	NCAA.com	Jamie Smock	A. J. Mleczko	
2012	NCAA.com	Matt Menzl	A. J. Mleczko	
2013	NCAA.com	Will Flemming	A. J. Mleczko	
2014	NCAA.com	Leah Secondo	A. J. Mleczko	
2015	NCAA.com	Leah Secondo		
2016	NCAA.com	Scott Sudikoff		
2017	BTN	Dan Kelly	Sonny Watrous	Sara Dayley
2017	BTN	Scott Sudikoff	Sonny Watrous	
2018	BTN	Dan Kelly	Sonny Watrous	Allison Hayes
2019	BTN	Chris Vosters	Sonny Watrous	Margaux Farrell
2021	ESPNU	Clay Matvick	A. J. Mleczko	
2022	ESPN+	Clay Matvick	A. J. Mleczko	Hilary Knight
2023	ESPN+	Clay Matvick	A. J. Mleczko	Hilary Knight
2024	ESPNU	Leah Hextall	A. J. Mleczko	Dana Boyle
2025	ESPNU	Jason Ross Jr.	A. J. Mleczko	Blake Bolden
2026	ESPNU	Jason Ross Jr. (Frozen Four)	A. J. Mleczko	Madison Packer
2026	ESPNU	John Buccigross (National Championship)	A. J. Mleczko	Madison Packer

== Records and statistics ==
- NCAA Division I women's ice hockey tournament Most Outstanding Player
- NCAA National Collegiate women's ice hockey tournament all-time team records

== See also ==
- NCAA Division III women's ice hockey tournament
- NCAA men's ice hockey championship
