= 2023–24 Vermont Catamounts women's ice hockey season =

NCAA Division I women's hockey season

- Conference: WHEA
- Home ice: Gutterson Fieldhouse

Rankings
- USA Today: NR
- USCHO.com: NR

Record
- Overall: 13–17–5
- Conference: 11–12–4
- Home: 10–7–1
- Road: 3–10–4

Coaches and captains
- Head coach: Jim Plumer
- Assistant coaches: Alex Gettens; Victoria Blake
- Captain: Natálie Mlýnková
- Alternate captain(s): Hailey Burns; Sara Lévesque; Maddy Skelton; Alaina Tanski

The 2023–24 Vermont Catamounts women's ice hockey season represented the University of Vermont during the 2023–24 NCAA Division I women's ice hockey season.

== Offseason ==
=== Recruiting ===
Player	Position	Class	Previous school
Rose-Marie Brochu	F	Incoming freshman	
McKenzie Cerrato	F	Incoming freshman	
Cecilia DesLauriers	F/D	Incoming freshman	
Hailey Eikos	D	Incoming freshman	
Brooke George	D	Incoming freshman	
Kaylee Lewis	F	Incoming freshman	
Ezra Oien	F	Incoming freshman	
Natalie Zarcone	D	Incoming freshman	

=== Departures ===
Player	Position	Class	Destination
Alex Gray	F	Graduated	
Lilly Holmes	F	Graduated	
Sini Karjalainen	D	Brynäs IF	
Corinne McCool	F	Graduated	
Cam Morrissey	D	Graduated	
Ellice Murphy	D	Graduated	
Tynka Pátková	F	Linköping HC	
Theresa Schafzahl	F	PWHL Boston	

=== PWHL Draft ===
Round	Player	Position	Team
7	Theresa Schafzahl	F	PWHL Boston
10	Maude Poulin-Labelle	D	PWHL Montreal

== Regular season ==
=== Standings ===
- 2023–24 WHEA standings
  	Conference										Overall					
  	GP	W	L	T	OTW	OTL	SOW	PTS	GF	GA	GP	W	L	T	GF	GA
  #11 UConn †	27	19	4	4	2	1	1	61	70	28	38	25	8	5	91	47
  #13 Northeastern	27	16	8	3	4	2	2	51	67	40	39	25	11	3	94	50
  New Hampshire	27	14	11	2	0	4	2	50	63	64	36	18	16	2	85	87
  #15 Boston College	27	13	9	5	2	1	3	46	75	64	36	15	14	7	95	97
  Providence	27	12	10	5	1	2	2	44	64	59	35	13	17	5	72	84
  Vermont	27	11	12	4	2	2	2	39	61	70	35	13	17	5	79	94
  Boston University	27	12	13	1	2	1	0	36	65	65	35	14	18	3	87	91
  Maine	27	11	14	2	3	1	0	33	64	65	35	15	18	2	94	89
  Merrimack	27	7	17	3	2	4	1	27	48	76	36	11	22	3	62	104
  Holy Cross	27	4	20	3	2	2	3	18	39	84	35	8	24	3	65	103
  Championship: March 9, 2024 † indicates conference regular season champion; * indicates conference tournament champion Rankings: USCHO.com; updated March 24, 2024

=== Schedule ===
As of October 5, 2024.

Date	Time	Opponent^{#}	Rank^{#}	Site	Decision	Result	Record
Regular season
Oct 6	6:00	#9 Clarkson*	#13	Gutterson Fieldhouse • Burlington, Vermont	Jessie McPherson	L 2–4	0–1–0 (0–0–0)
Oct 7	7:00	#9 Clarkson*	#13	Gutterson Fieldhouse • Burlington, Vermont	McPherson	T 2–2 ^{ot}	0–1–1 (0–0–0)
Oct 13	5:00	#11 St. Lawrence*	#12	Gutterson Fieldhouse • Burlington, Vermont	McPherson	W 6–2	1–1–1 (0–0–0)
Oct 14	3:00	at #11 St. Lawrence*	#12	Appleton Arena • Canton, New York	McPherson	L 0–3	1–2–1 (0–0–0)
Oct 20	4:00	at Merrimack	#12	Lawler Arena • North Andover, Massachusetts	McPherson	W 4–2	2–2–1 (1–0–0)
Oct 21	4:00	at Merrimack	#12	Lawler Arena • North Andover, Massachusetts	McPherson	W 4–2	3–2–1 (2–0–0)
Oct 27	4:00	New Hampshire	#12	Gutterson Fieldhouse • Burlington, Vermont	McPherson	W 6–3	4–2–1 (3–0–0)
Oct 28	4:00	New Hampshire	#12	Gutterson Fieldhouse • Burlington, Vermont	McPherson	W 2–1 ^{ot}	5–2–1 (4–0–0)
Nov 3	6:00	at Holy Cross	#12	Hart Center • Worcester, Massachusetts	Ellie Simmons	L 2–3 ^{ot}	5–3–1 (4–1–0)
Nov 10	6:00	#15 Boston College	#13	Gutterson Fieldhouse • Burlington, Vermont	Simmons	L 3–6	5–4–1 (4–2–0)
Nov 11	3:00	#15 Boston College	#13	Gutterson Fieldhouse • Burlington, Vermont	Sydney Correa	W 3–2	6–4–1 (5–2–0)
Nov 17	6:00	Maine	#14	Gutterson Fieldhouse • Burlington, Vermont	Correa	L 0–3	6–5–1 (5–3–0)
Nov 18	3:00	Maine	#14	Gutterson Fieldhouse • Burlington, Vermont	Correa	L 2–3	6–6–1 (5–4–0)
Nov 21	6:00	Northeastern	#15	Gutterson Fieldhouse • Burlington, Vermont	McPherson	W 3–2	7–6–1 (6–4–0)
Dec 1	2:00	at Maine	#14	Alfond Arena • Orono, Maine	McPherson	L 2–3	7–7–1 (6–5–0)
Dec 2	6:00	at New Hampshire	#14	Whittemore Center • Durham, New Hampshire	McPherson	L 0–1	7–8–1 (6–6–0)
Dec 8	2:00	Merrimack		Gutterson Fieldhouse • Burlington, Vermont	McPherson	W 4–2	8–8–1 (7–6–0)
Jan 2	6:00	Saint Michael's College*		Gutterson Fieldhouse • Burlington, Vermont	Simmons	W 6–0	9–8–1 (7–6–0)
Jan 5	3:00	at RPI*		Houston Field House • Troy, New York	Correa	L 1–5	9–9–1 (7–6–0)
Jan 6	3:00	at RPI*		Houston Field House • Troy, New York	Simmons	L 1–5	9–10–1 (7–6–0)
Jan 12	6:00	Providence		Gutterson Fieldhouse • Burlington, Vermont	McPherson	L 0–6	9–11–1 (7–7–0)
Jan 13	6:00	Providence		Gutterson Fieldhouse • Burlington, Vermont	Simmons	L 3–4 ^{ot}	9–12–1 (7–8–0)
Jan 19	6:00	at Boston University		Walter Brown Arena • Boston, Massachusetts	McPherson	L 1–6	9–13–1 (7–9–0)
Jan 20	3:00	at Boston University		Walter Brown Arena • Boston, Massachusetts	McPherson	L 2–4	9–14–1 (7–10–0)
Jan 26	6:00	at #11 Connecticut		Toscano Family Ice Forum • Storrs, Connecticut	McPherson	L 0–3	9–15–1 (7–11–0)
Jan 27	3:00	at #11 Connecticut		Toscano Family Ice Forum • Storrs, Connecticut	McPherson	T 0–0 ^{SOL}	9–15–2 (7–11–1)
Feb 2	6:00	Holy Cross		Gutterson Fieldhouse • Burlington, Vermont	McPherson	W 6–3	10–15–2 (8–11–1)
Feb 3	6:00	Holy Cross		Gutterson Fieldhouse • Burlington, Vermont	McPherson	W 3–2 ^{ot}	11–15–2 (9–11–1)
Feb 9	2:00	at Boston College		Conte Forum • Chestnut Hill, Massachusetts	McPherson	T 2–2 ^{SOL}	11–15–3 (9–11–2)
Feb 10	3:00	at Providence		Schneider Arena • Providence, Rhode Island	McPherson	T 2–2 ^{SOW}	11–15–4 (9–11–3)
Feb 16	2:00	Boston University		Gutterson Fieldhouse • Burlington, Vermont	McPherson	L 1–4	11–16–4 (9–12–3)
Feb 17	1:00	#11 Connecticut		Gutterson Fieldhouse • Burlington, Vermont	McPherson	W 3–0	12–16–4 (10–12–3)
Feb 23	6:00	at #12 Northeastern		Matthews Arena • Boston, Massachusetts	McPherson	W 2–0	13–16–4 (11–12–3)
Feb 24	7:30	at #12 Northeastern		Matthews Arena • Boston, Massachusetts	McPherson	T 1–1 ^{SOW}	13–16–5 (11–12–4)
Hockey East Tournament
Mar 2	6:00	#3 New Hampshire	#6	Whittemore Center • Durham, New Hampshire (Hockey East Quarterfinals)	McPherson	L 0–3	13–17–5 (11–12–4)
*Non-conference game. ^{#}Rankings from USCHO.com Poll.

== Roster ==
2023-2024 Women's Ice Hockey Roster
No.	Name	Position	Year	Height	Hometown	Previous Team
2	Ezra Oien	Forward	FR	5'7	Owatonna, Minnesota	Owatonna High School
3	Bella Parento	Defense	SR	5'5	Montpelier, Vermont	Kimball Union Academy
4	Natalie Zarcone	Defense	FR	5'5	Huntington, New York	Northwood School
6	Evelyne Blais-Savoie	Forward	JR	5'9	San Jose, California	Meijer AAA Hockey 19U
7	McKenzie Cerrato	Forward	FR	5'3	Malden, Massachusetts	Matignon High School
8	Anna Podein	Defense	RS SO	5'8	Minneapolis, Minnesota	Benilde-St. Margaret's
9	Julia Mesplede	Forward	SO	5'2	Bordeaux, France	France National Team
10	Lara Beecher	Forward	SO	5'5	Buffalo, New York	Philadelphia Junior Flyers
11	Kaylee Lewis	Forward	FR	5'7	McKinney, Texas	Philadelphia Junior Flyers
12	Maddy Skelton	Forward	SR	5'6	Isanti, Minnesota	North Wright County
14	Krista Parkkonen	Defense	SO	5'6	Lappeenranta, Finland	Finland U-18 National Team
17	Brooke George	Defense	FR	5'5	East Montpelier, Vermont	Bishop Kearney Selects
19	Cecilia DesLauriers	Forward	FR	5'0	St. Albans, Vermont	Mid Fairfield CT Stars
23	Hailey Burns	Forward	GR	5'5	Kirkland, Quebec	John Abbott College
24	Rose-Marie Brochu	Forward	FR	5'8	Lévis, Québec	Cégep Limoilou Titans
27	Sofie Skott Dahl	Defense	SO	5'8	Herning, Denmark	Denmark National Team
35	Ellie Simmons	Goalie	SO	5'8	Buffalo, New York	Nichols School
38	Sydney Correa	Goalie	JR	5'6	Georgetown, Massachusetts	Brooks School
43	Alaina Tanski	Forward	JR	5'4	Hermantown, Minnesota	Pittsburgh Penguins Elite
49	Sara Levesque	Defense	GR	5'3	Chicoutimi, Quebec	John Abbott College
55	Hailey Eikos	Defense	FR	5'3	Brooklyn Park, Minnesota	Osseo/Park Center
66	Lily Humphrey	Forward	GR	5'5	Huntington Beach, California	New Hampton School
91	Jessie McPherson	Goalie	SR	5'9	Chatham, Ontario	Cambridge Rivulettes
96	Natálie Mlýnková	Forward	SR	5'3	Zlín, Czech Republic	HTI Stars

== Awards and honors ==
- Natálie Mlýnková named Hockey East Player of the Week (October 30, 2023)
- Krista Parkkonen named Hockey East Defender of the Week (December 11, 2023)
- Krista Parkkonen named Hockey East Defender of the Week (February 6, 2024)
- Kaylee Lewis named Hockey East Rookie of the Week (February 6, 2024)
- Natálie Mlýnková named Hockey East Player of the Week (February 12, 2024)
- Jessie McPherson named Hockey East Goaltender of the Week (February 26, 2024)
- Kaylee Lewis named to 2023-24 Hockey East All-Rookie Team (February 28, 2024)
- Natálie Mlýnková named 2023-24 Hockey East Scoring Champion (February 28, 2024)
- Natálie Mlýnková named to 2023-24 Hockey East First-Team All Star team (March 1, 2024)
- Krista Parkkonen named to 2023-24 Hockey East Second-Team All Star team (March 1, 2024)
- Natálie Mlýnková named Hockey East Player of the Month (February 2024)
- Natálie Mlýnková named Hockey East Player of the Year
