= 2021–22 Vermont Catamounts women's ice hockey season =

NCAA Division I women's hockey season

- Conference: 2nd WHEA
- Home ice: Gutterson Fieldhouse

Record
- Overall: 22–11–3
- Conference: 18–7–2
- Home: 13–7–1
- Road: 9–4–2

Coaches and captains
- Head coach: Jim Plumer
- Assistant coaches: Jess Koizumi; Alex Gettens
- Captain: Kristina Shanahan
- Alternate captain(s): Alex Gray; Sini Karjalainen; Theresa Schafzahl

The Vermont Catamounts women's ice hockey program represented the University of Vermont in the Women's Hockey East Association during the 2021–22 NCAA Division I women's ice hockey season.

== Offseason ==
=== Recruiting ===
| Player | Position | Class | Previous school |
|---|---|---|---|
| Evelyne Blais-Savoie | F | Incoming freshman | |
| Sydney Correa | G | Incoming freshman | |
| Antonia Matzka | D | Graduate | Holy Cross |
| Reagan Miller | F | Incoming freshman | |
| Anna Podein | D | Incoming freshman | |
| Alaina Tanski | F | Incoming freshman | |

=== Departures ===
| Player | Position | Class | Destination |
|---|---|---|---|
| Val Caldwell | F | Graduate | Lindenwood |
| Anna Erickson | D | Graduated | |
| Natalie Ferenc | G | Junior | Lindenwood |
| Olivia Kilberg | F | Graduated | |

== Regular season ==
=== Standings ===
2021–22 WHEA standings
| | Conference | | | | | | | Overall | | | | | |
| | GP | W | L | T | PTS | GF | GA | GP | W | L | T | GF | GA |
|---|---|---|---|---|---|---|---|---|---|---|---|---|---|
| #3 Northeastern †* | 26 | 21 | 3 | 2 | 67 | 96 | 27 | 38 | 31 | 5 | 2 | 136 | 40 |
| Vermont | 27 | 18 | 7 | 2 | 57 | 86 | 56 | 36 | 22 | 11 | 3 | 107 | 76 |
| UConn | 27 | 16 | 7 | 4 | 50 | 66 | 49 | 37 | 24 | 9 | 4 | 99 | 64 |
| Boston College | 26 | 16 | 9 | 1 | 47 | 71 | 63 | 34 | 19 | 14 | 1 | 88 | 84 |
| Maine | 26 | 12 | 13 | 1 | 41 | 57 | 59 | 35 | 15 | 19 | 1 | 75 | 87 |
| Boston University | 25 | 11 | 9 | 5 | 39 | 57 | 58 | 33 | 12 | 15 | 6 | 70 | 82 |
| Providence | 27 | 12 | 12 | 3 | 39 | 52 | 53 | 36 | 16 | 14 | 6 | 67 | 67 |
| New Hampshire | 26 | 9 | 16 | 1 | 30 | 51 | 74 | 34 | 11 | 21 | 2 | 71 | 95 |
| Merrimack | 27 | 6 | 20 | 1 | 20 | 53 | 86 | 34 | 8 | 25 | 1 | 61 | 116 |
| Holy Cross | 27 | 1 | 26 | 0 | 6 | 36 | 100 | 33 | 3 | 30 | 0 | 46 | 120 |
Championship: March 8, 2022 † indicates conference regular season champion; * indicates conference tournament champion Rankings: USCHO.com; updated March 20, 2022

== Schedule ==
| Date | Opponent^{#} | Rank^{#} | Site | Decision | Result | Record Source: |
Regular Season
| October 1 | RPI | | Gutterson Fieldhouse • Burlington, Vermont | Blanka Škodová W, 1 | W 3-2 ^{OT} | 1–0–0 (0–0–0) |
| October 2 | RPI | | Gutterson Fieldhouse • Burlington, Vermont | Blanka Škodová W, 2 | W 4-1 | 2–0–0 (0–0–0) |
| October 9 | Colgate* | #4 | Gutterson Fieldhouse • Burlington, Vermont | Blanka Škodová L, 1 | L 0-3 | 2–1–0 (0–0–0) |
| October 10 | Colgate* | #4 | Gutterson Fieldhouse • Burlington, Vermont | Blanka Škodová L, 2 | L 1-5 | 2–2–0 (0–0–0) |
| October 22 | Holy Cross | | Gutterson Fieldhouse • Burlington, Vermont | Blanka Škodová W, 3 | W 3-2 | 3–2–0 (1–0–0) |
| October 24 | Merrimack | | Gutterson Fieldhouse • Burlington, Vermont | Blanka Škodová W, 4 | W 2-1 | 4–2–0 (2–0–0) |
| October 29 | at Boston University | | Walter Brown Arena • Boston, Massachusetts | Blanka Škodová T, 1 | T 1-1 ^{OT} | 4–2–1 (2–0–1) |
| October 30 | at Connecticut | | Mark Edward Freitas Ice Forum • Storrs, Connecticut | Blanka Škodová L, 2 | L 1-2 ^{OT} | 4–3–1 (2–1–1) |
| November 9 | at Dartmouth* | | Thompson Arena • Hanover, New Hampshire | Jessie McPherson L, 1 | L 2-3 ^{OT} | 4–4–1 (2–1–1) |
| November 12 | Northeastern | #4 | Gutterson Fieldhouse • Burlington, Vermont | Jessie McPherson L, 2 | L 0-3 | 4–5–1 (2–2–1) |
| November 13 | Northeastern | #4 | Gutterson Fieldhouse • Burlington, Vermont | Blanka Škodová L, 3 | L 1-3 | 4–6–1 (2–3–1) |
| November 20 | at Merrimack | | Lawler Rink • North Andover, Massachusetts | Jessie McPherson W, 1 | W 5-4 ^{OT} | 5–6–1 (3–3–1) |
| November 21 | at Merrimack | | Lawler Rink • North Andover, Massachusetts | Jessie McPherson W, 2 | W 5-2 | 6–6–1 (4–3–1) |
| November 26 | Syracuse* | | Gutterson Fieldhouse • Burlington, Vermont | Blanka Škodová T, 2 | T 1-1 ^{OT} | 6–6–2 (4–3–1) |
| November 27 | Syracuse* | | Gutterson Fieldhouse • Burlington, Vermont | Jessie McPherson W, 3 | W 5-1 | 7–6–2 (4–3–1) |
| December 3 | at New Hampshire | | Whittemore Center Arena • Durham, New Hampshire | Jessie McPherson L, 3 | L 2-5 | 7–7–2 (4–4–1) |
| December 4 | at New Hampshire | | Whittemore Center Arena • Durham, New Hampshire | Blanka Škodová W, 5 | W 6-3 | 8–7–2 (5–4–1) |
| December 10 | Boston College | | Gutterson Fieldhouse • Burlington, Vermont | Jessie McPherson W, 4 | W 3-1 | 9–7–2 (6–4–1) |
| December 31 | at Providence | | Schneider Arena • Providence, Rhode Island | Sydney Correa L, 1 | L 1-3 | 9–8–2 (6–5–1) |
| January 2 | Maine | | Gutterson Fieldhouse • Burlington, Vermont | Sydney Correa W, 1 | W 3-0 | 10–8–2 (7–5–1) |
| January 7 | Connecticut | #10 | Gutterson Fieldhouse • Burlington, Vermont | Sydney Correa L, 2 | L 1-5 | 10–9–2 (7–6–1) |
| January 8 | Connecticut | #10 | Gutterson Fieldhouse • Burlington, Vermont | Sydney Correa W, 2 | W 6-2 | 11–9–2 (8–6–1) |
| January 17 | at Holy Cross | | Hart Center Arena • Worcester, Massachusetts | Jessie McPherson W, 5 | W 1-3 | 12–9–2 (9–6–1) |
| January 18 | at Holy Cross | | Hart Center Arena • Worcester, Massachusetts | Jessie McPherson W, 6 | W 9-0 | 13–9–2 (10–6–1) |
| January 21 | Providence | | Gutterson Fieldhouse • Burlington, Vermont | Jessie McPherson W, 7 | W 3-1 | 14–9–2 (11–6–1) |
| January 22 | Providence | | Gutterson Fieldhouse • Burlington, Vermont | Jessie McPherson W, 8 | W 4-1 | 15–9–2 (12–6–1) |
| January 28 | at Northeastern | #1 | Matthews Arena • Boston, Massachusetts | Jessie McPherson W, 9 | W 2-1 | 16–9–2 (13–6–1) |
| January 30 | New Hampshire | | Gutterson Fieldhouse • Burlington, Vermont | Jessie McPherson W, 10 | W 4-2 | 17–9–2 (14–6–1) |
| February 4 | at Maine | | Alfond Arena • Orono, Maine | Jessie McPherson W, 11 | W 2-1 | 18–9–2 (15–6–1) |
| February 5 | at Maine | | Alfond Arena • Orono, Maine | Jessie McPherson W, 12 | W 3-1 | 19–9–2 (16–6–1) |
| February 11 | Boston University | | Gutterson Fieldhouse • Burlington, Vermont | Jessie McPherson L, 4 | L 4-3 | 19–10–2 (16–7–1) |
| February 12 | Boston University | | Gutterson Fieldhouse • Burlington, Vermont | Jessie McPherson W, 13 | W 5-2 | 20–10–2 (17–7–1) |
| February 18 | at Boston College | | Conte Forum • Chestnut Hill, Massachusetts | Jessie McPherson T, 1 | T 3-3 ^{OT} | 20–10–3 (17–7–2) |
| February 19 | at Boston College | | Conte Forum • Chestnut Hill, Massachusetts | Jessie McPherson W, 14 | W 4-2 | 21–10–3 (18–7–2) |
Hockey East Tournament
| February 26 | vs. Providence | | Gutterson Fieldhouse • Burlington, Vermont | Jessie McPherson W, 15 | W 4-1 | 21–10–3 (18–7–2) |
| March 2 | vs. Connecticut | | Gutterson Fieldhouse • Burlington, Vermont | Jessie McPherson L, 5 | L 1-3 | 21–11–3 (18–7–2) |
*Non-conference game. ^{#}Rankings from USCHO.com Poll.

== Roster ==
2021-2022 Women's Ice Hockey Roster
| No. | Name | Position | Year | Height | Hometown | Previous Team |
|---|---|---|---|---|---|---|
| 2 | Sini Karjalainen | Defense | SR | 5'8 | Posio, Finland | Finland U-18 National Team |
| 3 | Bella Parento | Defense | SO | 5'5 | Montpelier, Vermont | Kimball Union Academy |
| 5 | Cam Morrissey | Defense | JR | 5'6 | Troy, Michigan | Selects Hockey |
| 6 | Evelyne Blais-Savoie | Forward | FR | 5'9 | San Jose, California | Meijer AAA Hockey 19U |
| 7 | Kristina Shananhan | Forward | GR | 5'4 | Sainte-Anne-de-Bellevue, Quebec | Dawson College |
| 8 | Anna Podein | Defense | FR | 5'8 | Minneapolis, Minnesota | Benilde-St. Margaret's |
| 11 | Ellice Murphy | Defense | SR | 5'4 | Roseau, Minnesota | Roseau High School |
| 12 | Maddy Skelton | Forward | SO | 5'6 | Isanti, Minnesota | North Wright County |
| 13 | Lilly Holmes | Forward | SR | 5'5 | Saratoga Springs, New York | Westminster |
| 16 | Antonia Matzka | Defense | GR | 5'8 | Moedling, Austria | Holy Cross |
| 17 | Theresa Schafzahl | Forward | SR | 5'8 | Weiz, Austria | Austria National Team |
| 21 | Reagan Miller | Forward | FR | 5'5 | Cary, North Carolina | Selects Hockey Academy |
| 22 | Alex Gray | Forward | SR | 5'7 | Brownlee, Saskatchewan | Stanstead College |
| 23 | Hailey Burns | Forward | JR | 5'5 | Kirkland, Quebec | John Abbott College |
| 24 | Corinne McCool | Forward | SR | 5'8 | West Roxbury, Massachusetts | Lawrence Academy |
| 25 | Alyssa Holmes | Forward | GR | 5'4 | Burlington, Ontario | Stoney Creek |
| 31 | Blanka Škodová | Goalie | SR | 5'9 | Šternberk, Czech Republic | Vermont Academy |
| 38 | Sydney Correa | Goalie | FR | 5'6 | Georgetown, Massachusetts | Brooks School |
| 43 | Alaina Tanski | Forward | FR | 5'4 | Hermantown, Minnesota | Pittsburgh Penguins Elite |
| 49 | Sara Levesque | Defense | JR | 5'3 | Chicoutimi, Quebec | John Abbott College |
| 66 | Lily Humphrey | Forward | JR | 5'5 | Huntington Beach, California | New Hampton School |
| 68 | Tynka Pátková | Forward | RS SO | 5'5 | Meziboří, Czech Republic | HTI Stars |
| 76 | Maude Poulin-Labelle | Defense | SR | 5'6 | Sherbrooke, Quebec | Stanstead College |
| 91 | Jessie McPherson | Goalie | SO | 5'9 | Chatham, Ontario | Cambridge Rivulettes |
| 96 | Natálie Mlýnková | Forward | SO | 5'3 | Zlín, Czech Republic | HTI Stars |

== Awards and honors ==
- Kristina Shanahan, Hockey East Second Team All-Star
- Jessie McPherson, Hockey East All-Star Honorable Mention
- Reagan Miller, Hockey East All-Rookie Team
- Alyssa Holmes, Hockey East Best Defensive Forward Award
- Maude Poulin-Labelle, Hockey East First Team All-Star
- Maude Poulin-Labelle, Hockey East Best Defenseman Award
- Theresa Schafzahl, Hockey East First Team All-Star
- Theresa Schafzahl, Hockey East Scoring Champion
- Theresa Schafzahl, PNC Bank Three Stars Award
- Theresa Schafzahl, Cammi Granato Hockey East Player of the Year
- Jim Plumer, Hockey East Coach of the Year

=== Patty Kazmaier Award ===
- Theresa Schafzahl, Top 10 Finalist

=== Division I CCM/AHCA All-Americans ===
- Theresa Schafzahl, First Team
- Maude Poulin-Labelle, Second Team

=== All-USCHO Teams ===
- Theresa Schafzahl, Second Team
