= 2018–19 Vermont Catamounts women's ice hockey season =

2019–20 Vermont Catamounts women's ice hockey season
- Conference: 8th WHEA
- Home ice: Gutterson Fieldhouse

Record
- Overall: 10–20–6
- Conference: 8–15–4
- Home: 6–9–3
- Road: 4–11–3

Coaches and captains
- Head coach: Jim Plumer
- Assistant coaches: Jess Koizumi; Alex Gettens

The Vermont Catamounts women's ice hockey program represented the University of Vermont during the 2018–19 NCAA Division I women's ice hockey season.

== Offseason ==
=== Recruiting ===
Player	Position	Class	Previous school
Abby Cleary	F	Junior	Quinnipiac
Alex Gray	F	Incoming freshman	
Lilly Holmes	F	Incoming freshman	
Sini Karjalainen	D	Incoming freshman	
Corinne McCool	F	Incoming freshman	
Ellice Murphy	D	Incoming freshman	
Maude Poulin-Labelle	D	Incoming freshman	
Theresa Schafzahl	F	Incoming freshman	
Blanka Škodová	G	Incoming freshman	

=== Departures ===
Player	Position	Class	Destination
Amanda Drobot	D	Graduated	
Mackenzie MacNeil	F	Graduated	
Kourtney Menches	F	Graduated	
Daria O'Neill	D	Senior	Mount Royal University
Katherine Pate	D	Graduated	
Sydney Scobee	G	Junior	Minnesota
Taylor Willard	D	Graduated	

== Regular season ==
=== Standings ===
2018–19 WHEA standings
	Conference							Overall					
	GP	W	L	T	PTS	GF	GA	GP	W	L	T	GF	GA
#5 Northeastern†*	27	21	3	3	45	98	50	38	27	6	5	131	75
#6 Boston College	27	19	7	1	39	98	53	39	26	12	1	132	78
#8 Boston University	27	15	6	6	36	86	53	37	21	8	8	118	70
Providence	27	16	9	2	34	72	53	37	24	11	2	104	70
Merrimack	27	12	10	5	29	80	64	36	16	13	7	97	77
New Hampshire	27	10	14	3	'23	61	69	36	13	17	6	77	86
Connecticut	27	9	14	4	22	54	74	36	14	18	4	82	96
Vermont	27	8	15	4	20	50	73	36	10	20	6	70	101
Maine	27	7	15	5	19	51	66	34	14	15	5	82	70
Holy Cross	27	1	25	1	3	28	123	33	1	29	3	34	141
Championship: March 10, 2019 † indicates conference regular season champion; * indicates conference tournament champion Rankings: USCHO.com

== Roster ==
2018-2019 Women's Ice Hockey Roster
No.	Name	Position	Year	Height	Hometown	Previous Team
1	Sierra Natzke	Goalie	SO	5'6	Pine, Colorado	Lansing Spartans
2	Sini Karjalainen	Defense	FR	5'8	Posio, Finland	Finland U-18 National Team
4	Sammy Kolowrat	Defense	SR	5'7	Prague, Czech Republic	Czech Republic National Team
7	Kristina Shananhan	Forward	SO	5'4	Sainte-Anne-de-Bellevue, Quebec	Dawson College
9	Olivia Kilberg	Forward	SO	5'4	Edina, Minnesota	Edina High School
10	Ellice Murphy	Defense	FR	5'4	Roseau, Minnesota	Roseau High School
11	Abby Cleary	Forward	JR	5'8	Buffalo, New York	Quinnipiac
12	Greta Close	Defense	SO	5'7	Norwich, Vermont	Kimball Union Academy
13	Lilly Holmes	Forward	FR	5'5	Saratoga Springs, New York	Westminster
14	Ali O'Leary	Forward	JR	5'4	Reading, Massachusetts	Boston Shamrocks
17	Theresa Schafzahl	Forward	FR	5'8	Weiz, Austria	Austria National Team
18	Corinne McCool	Forward	FR	5'8	West Roxbury, Massachusetts	Lawrence Academy
19	Val Caldwell	Forward	SO	5'6	Glenview, Illinois	Chicago Mission
21	Allie Granato	Forward	JR	5'3	Plainfield, Illinois	Chicago Fury
22	Alex Gray	Forward	FR	5'7	Brownlee, Saskatchewan	Stanstead College
23	Alyssa Gorecki	Forward	SR	5'4	Monee, Illinois	USA U-18
24	Saana Valkama	Forward	SR	5'6	Pirkkala, Finland	Finland National Team
25	Alyssa Holmes	Forward	SO	5'4	Burlington, Ontario	Stoney Creek
26	Ève-Audrey Picard	Forward	JR	5'5	Longueuil, Quebec	Canada U-18 Team
29	Taylor Flaherty	Defense	SR	5'9	Lakeville, Minnesota	North Dakota
31	Blanka Škodová	Goalie	FR	5'9	Šternberk, Czech Republic	Vermont Academy
33	Melissa Black	Goalie	SR	5'5	Newmarket, Ontario	Union
44	Anna Erickson	Defense	SO	5'4	Stillwater, Minnesota	Minnesota Connections Academy
76	Maude Poulin-Labelle	Defense	FR	5'6	Sherbrooke, Quebec	Stanstead College
