= Vermont Catamounts women's ice hockey =

- Current season
- University: University of Vermont
- Conference: Hockey East
- Head coach: Jim Plumer; 13th season, 161–220–54
- Assistant coaches: Victoria Blake; Erik Strand
- Arena: Gutterson Fieldhouse; Burlington, Vermont
- Colors: Green and gold

The Vermont Catamounts women's ice hockey program represents the University of Vermont. The Catamounts compete in Hockey East. Their first year of varsity women's hockey was in 1998–99. The Catamounts were in the ECAC at the Division III level of competition. In 2001–02, the Catamounts moved up to Division I. For the 2005–06 season, the Catamounts moved to Hockey East.

== History ==
The Vermont Catamounts women's ice hockey program was launched in 1995–1996, under head coach Bruce Garrapy.

During the 2003–04 season, Kami Cote of Vermont set an NCAA record for most saves in one season with 1332.

During the 2010–11 season, Roxanne Douville earned consecutive shutouts against No. 9 Providence (Jan. 30) and Maine (Feb. 5) establishing a new program record shutout streak of 164 minutes and 13 seconds. In addition, she became only the second Vermont player to be named to the Hockey East All-Rookie Team.

The 2013– 2014 season saw Vermont's best finish, ending the season 18–4–4, and earning fourth place in Hockey East. They won their quarterfinal match-up against Maine with three overtime wins. They advanced to meet Boston College in the semi-finals, losing by a score of 1–3. Catamount head coach Jim Plumer won the Hockey East co-Coach of the Year award and the New England Division I Women's Coach of the Year award.

In 2019–2020, sophomore defenceman Maude Poulin-Labelle set the team's record for points by a defenseman in a single season, with 12 goals and 17 assists, for 29 points. Her goals total tied for first among Catamount defensemen. She was Hockey East player of the Week on January 6, 2020. She was nominated for the Patty Kazmaier Memorial Award, and earned a spot on the Hockey East All Star Third Team. The Catamounts started the season on a four-game unbeaten streak, and lost just 2 games in their first 12 matches. They made the Hockey East tournament for the eighth consecutive year, but fell to the eventual tournament winners, the Northeastern Huskies, in the quarterfinals.

On November 11, 2020, Hockey East announced the 2020–2021 schedule for men's and women's ice hockey. League play had been postponed due to the ongoing COVID-19 pandemic in the United States, which caused the cancellation of the 2020 NCAA women's ice hockey tournament. Beginning on November 20, women's hockey resumes in a round robin format with each team playing 18 games, to determine the regular season champion. Flex weekends are planned to allow for canceled matches to be played as needed.

During the 2021–2022 season, the Catamounts were ranked for the first time in program history at #10 in the USCHO poll on January 31, 2022. They were ranked at #10 in the USA Hockey poll on February 22, 2022, for the first time ever. They also set a program record of 22 wins in a season.

== Season-by-season results ==
Won championship	Lost championship	Conference champions	League leader

Year	Coach	W	L	T	Conference	Conf. W	Conf. L	Conf. T	Finish	Conference Tournament	NCAA Tournament
2025–26	Jim Plumer	16	17	5	Hockey East	9	11	4	6th HE	Won Quarterfinals vs. Boston College (3–1); Lost Semifinals vs. Northeastern (1–3)	Did not qualify
2024–25	Jim Plumer	9	25	2	Hockey East	7	18	2	8th HE	Won First Round vs. Holy Cross (3–2 OT); Lost Quarterfinals vs. Boston University (3–4 OT)	Did not qualify
2023–24	Jim Plumer	13	17	5	Hockey East	11	12	4	6th HE	Lost Quarterfinals vs. New Hampshire (0–3)	Did not qualify
2022–23	Jim Plumer	22	11	3	Hockey East	16	8	3	2nd HE	Won Quarterfinals vs. New Hampshire (2–1 OT); Lost Semifinals vs. Providence (0–1)	Did not qualify
2021–22	Jim Plumer	22	11	3	Hockey East	18	7	2	2nd HE	Won Quarterfinals vs. Providence (4–1); Lost Semifinals vs. Connecticut (1–3)	Did not qualify
2020–21	Jim Plumer	6	5	0	Hockey East	6	4	0	4th HE	Lost Quarterfinals vs Maine (1–3)	Did not qualify
2019–20	Jim Plumer	10	18	8	Hockey East	7	14	6	8th HE	Lost Quarterfinals vs Northeastern (1–5, 1–3)	Did not qualify
2018–19	Jim Plumer	10	20	6	Hockey East	8	15	4	8th HE	Lost Quarterfinals vs. Northeastern (2–7, 0–1)	Did not qualify
2017–18	Jim Plumer	10	20	5	Hockey East	7	13	4	8th HE	Lost Quarterfinals vs. Boston College (1–3, 1–6)	Did not qualify
2016–17	Jim Plumer	15	14	9	Hockey East	9	8	7	5th HE	Won Quarterfinals vs. Providence (4–5, 5–1, 5–2); Lost Semifinals vs. Boston College (3–4) 2OT	Did not qualify
2015–16	Jim Plumer	9	25	3	Hockey East	6	15	3	6th HE	Lost Quarterfinals vs. Boston University (0–3, 4–2, 1–6)	Did not qualify
2014–15	Jim Plumer	15	19	2	Hockey East	6	14	1	7th HE	Lost Quarterfinals vs. Boston University (1–8, 2–7)	Did not qualify
2013–14	Jim Plumer	18	14	4	Hockey East	13	7	1	4th HE	Won Quarterfinals vs. Maine (3–2 3OT); Lost Semifinals vs. Boston College (1–3)	Did not qualify
2012–13	Jim Plumer	8	21	4	Hockey East	6	12	4	6th HE	Lost Quarterfinals vs. Northeastern (1–5)	Did not qualify
2011–12	Tim Bothwell	4	22	6	Hockey East	3	16	2	8th HE	Did not qualify	Did not qualify
2010–11	Tim Bothwell	7	17	9	Hockey East	4	13	4	8th HE	Did not qualify	Did not qualify
2009–10	Tim Bothwell	10	22	1	Hockey East	5	15	1	7th HE	Did not qualify	Did not qualify
2008–09	Tim Bothwell	7	25	2	Hockey East	4	15	2	7th HE	Did not qualify	Did not qualify
2007–08	Tim Bothwell	8	25	1	Hockey East	4	16	1	7th HE	Did not qualify	Did not qualify
2006–07	Tim Bothwell	3	27	2	Hockey East	1	19	1	8th HE	Did not qualify	Did not qualify
2005–06	Dennis Miller	3	29	2	Hockey East	1	19	1	8th HE	Did not qualify	Did not qualify
2004–05	Dennis Miller	5	26	3	ECAC	3	17	0	10th ECAC	Did not qualify	Did not qualify
2003–04	Dennis Miller	6	25	3	ECAC	2	15	1	9th ECAC	Did not qualify	Did not qualify
2002–03	Dennis Miller	3	25	2	ECAC	0	15	1	9th ECAC	Did not qualify	Did not qualify
2001–02	Dennis Miller	1	28	1	ECAC	0	16	0	9th ECAC	Did not qualify	Did not qualify

== Roster ==
As of July 23, 2025.

No.	Nat.	Player	Class	Pos	Height	DoB	Hometown	Previous team
4	(United States)	Natalie Zarcone	Junior	D	5' 5" (1.65 m)	2004-06-15	Huntington, New York	Northwood School
5	(United States)	Sophia DeAnzeris	Freshman	D	5' 11" (1.8 m)	2006-11-19	Saratoga, New York	Northwood School
8	(United States)	Anna Podein	Senior (RS)	D	5' 8" (1.73 m)	2003-01-16	Minneapolis, Minnesota	Benilde-St. Margaret's
9	(France)	Julia Mesplède	Senior	F	5' 2" (1.57 m)	2002-10-12	Bordeaux, France	Vermont Academy
10	(United States)	Stella Retrum	Junior	F	5' 7" (1.7 m)	2005-03-25	Maple Grove, Minnesota	Penn State
11	(United States)	Kaylee Lewis	Junior	F	5' 7" (1.7 m)	2004-07-06	McKinney, Texas	Philadelphia Jr. Flyers
12	(United States)	Lauren O'Hara	Junior	F	5' 11" (1.8 m)	2005-03-02	Blaine, Minnesota	Minnesota
13	(United States)	Maisey Bojarski	Sophomore	F	5' 7" (1.7 m)	2006-01-09	Appleton, Wisconsin	NAHA
15	(United States)	Josie Hemp	Sophomore (RS)	D	5' 9" (1.75 m)	2004-12-16	Chanhassen, Minnesota	Minnesota
16	(Canada)	Mya Lawrence	Sophomore	F	5' 5" (1.65 m)	2006-09-08	Okotoks, Alberta	Shawinigan
17	(United States)	Brooke George	Junior	D	5' 5" (1.65 m)	2004-07-18	East Montpelier, Vermont	Bishop Kearney Selects
18	(United States)	Darci Matson	Graduate	F	5' 4" (1.63 m)	2003-05-30	Wasilla, Alaska	Aurora
19	(United States)	Cecilia DesLauriers	Junior	F	5' 0" (1.52 m)	2004-01-12	St. Albans, Vermont	Mid Fairfield CT Stars
23	(United States)	Ezra Oien	Junior	F	5' 7" (1.7 m)	2004-11-23	Owatonna, Minnesota	Owatonna High School
24	(Canada)	Rose-Marie Brochu	Junior	F	5' 8" (1.73 m)	2003-04-27	Lévis, Québec	Cégep Limoilou Titans
27	(Denmark)	Sofie Skott	Senior	D	5' 8" (1.73 m)	2002-06-14	Herning, Denmark	Malmö Redhawks
30	(United States)	Lily Prendergast	Freshman	G	5' 8" (1.73 m)	2004-10-13	Hanover, Massachusetts	Etobicoke Dolphins
31	(Canada)	Zoe Cliche	Freshman	G	5' 7" (1.7 m)	2007-00-00	Ottawa, Ontario	Nepean Wildcats
35	(United States)	Ellie Simmons	Junior (RS)	G	5' 8" (1.73 m)	2004-01-18	Buffalo, New York	Nichols School
44	(United States)	Lila Pannacciulli	Freshman	F	5' 6" (1.68 m)	2006-09-15	East Meadow, New York	Lovell Academy
51	(Finland)	Oona Havana	Sophomore	F	5' 7" (1.7 m)	2004-08-20	Turku, Finland	Kärpät
71	(Canada)	Hilary Wilkin	Freshman	F	5' 8" (1.73 m)	2007-10-10	Halifax, Nova Scotia	Northwood School
88	(Canada)	Makena Lloyd-Howe	Freshman	F	5' 5" (1.65 m)	2007-02-02	Tumbler Ridge, British Columbia	RINK Hockey Academy
91	(United States)	Ashley Kokavec	Junior	D	5' 4" (1.63 m)	2005-01-01	Parkland, Florida	Maine
91	(Canada)	Morgann Skoda	Junior	F	5' 11" (1.8 m)	2003-10-26	Montreal, Quebec	RPI

== Player stats ==
=== Career points ===
Rank	Name	Years	Points
1	Theresa Schafzahl	18–23	145 (71–74)
2	Amanda Pelkey	11–15	105 (49–56)
3	Ève-Audrey Picard	16–20	98 (43–55)
4	Natálie Mlýnková	20–24	97 (48–49)
4	Danya Colang	12–16	97 (44–53)
4	Brittany Zuback	11–15	97 (44–53)
7	Kristina Shanahan	17–22	88 (42–46)
8	Corinne McCool	18–23	87 (39–48)
8	Allie Knowles	95–99	87 (46–41)
10	Sini Karjalainen	18–23	76 (11–65)

=== All-Time Leaders Goaltending ===
Metric	Number	Player
Best Save %	.933	Melanie Bouchard (1996–98)
Best GAA	1.66	Melanie Bouchard (1996–98)
Most Saves	3,221	Kami Cote (2001–05)
Most Shutouts	16	Tiffany Hayes (1999–03)
Most Wins	51	Jessie McPherson (2020–24)
Most Minutes	6008:14	Roxanne Douville (2010–14)
Fewest Goals Allowed	41	Micaela Dorf (1998–00)
Most Games Played	102	Roxanne Douville (2010–14)

== Awards and honors ==
=== AWCHA honors ===
Year	Player	Honor
1998	Dennis Miller	National Coach of the Year Finalist
2001	Tiffany Hayes	All-American
2001	Dennis Miller	National Coach of the Year Finalist

=== ECAC honors ===
Year	Player	Honor
1998	Allie Knowles	All-Star Honorable Mention
1998	Dennis Miller	Co-Coach of the Year
2000	Jillian Giardina	Division III All-Rookie Team
2000	Tiffany Hayes	Division III All-Rookie Team
2001	Tiffany Hayes	Division III Goaltender of the Year
2001	Tiffany Hayes	Division III All-Conference First Team
2001	Lindsey Neilson	Division III All-Rookie Team
2004	Kami Cote	All-Star Honorable Mention
2005	Kami Cote	All-Star First Team
2005	Kami Cote	Goaltender of the Year

=== Hockey East honors ===
Year	Player	Honor
2006	Abby Kaknes	All-Stars vs. Team USA
2009	Erin Barley-Maloney	All-Rookie Team
2011	Roxanne Douville	All-Rookie Team
2012	Amanda Pelkey	All-Rookie Team
2013	Roxanne Douville	First Team All-Star
2013	Erin Wente	Best Defensive Forward
2014	Victoria Andreakos	All-Rookie Team
2014	Jim Plumer	Co-Coach of the Year
2014	Roxanne Douville	First Team All-Star
2014	Gina Repaci	Second Team All-Star
2014	Amanda Pelkey	Second Team All-Star
2014	Dayna Colang	All-Star Honorable Mention
2015	Dayna Colang	All-Star Honorable Mention
2016	Taylor Willard	Second Team All-Star
2017	Ève-Audrey Picard	All-Rookie Team
2017	Madison Litchfield	Second Team All-Star
2017	Taylor Willard	Second Team All-Star
2018	Taylor Willard	All-Star Honorable Mention
2020	Maude Poulin-Labelle	Third Team All-Star
2021	Maude Poulin-Labelle	Second Team All-Star
2021	Jessie McPherson	Rookie of the Year
2021	Jessie McPherson	Pro Ambitions All-Rookie Team
2021	Olivia Kilberg	Sportsmanship Award
2022	Kristina Shanahan	Second Team All-Star
2022	Jessie McPherson	All-Star Honorable Mention
2022	Reagan Miller	All-Rookie Team
2022	Alyssa Holmes	Best Defensive Forward
2022	Maude Poulin-Labelle	First Team All-Star
2022	Maude Poulin-Labelle	Best Defenseman
2022	Theresa Schafzahl	First Team All-Star
2022	Theresa Schafzahl	Scoring Champion
2022	Theresa Schafzahl	PNC Bank Three Stars
2022	Theresa Schafzahl	Player of the Year
2022	Jim Plumer	Coach of the Year
2023	Lara Beecher	Rookie of the Year
2023	Lara Beecher	All-Rookie Team
2023	Sini Karjalainen	Defender of the Year
2023	Sini Karjalainen	First Team All-Star
2023	Theresa Schafzahl	First Team All-Star
2023	Jessie McPherson	Third Team All-Star
2023	Natálie Mlýnková	Third Team All-Star
2024	Natálie Mlýnková	Scoring Champion
2024	Natálie Mlýnková	First Team All-Star
2024	Natálie Mlýnková	Player of the Year
2024	Kaylee Lewis	All-Rookie Team
2024	Krista Parkkonen	Second Team All-Star
2025	Ashley Kokavec	Third Team All-Star
2026	Anna Podein	Sportsmanship Award
2026	Josie Hemp	Third Team All-Star
2026	Stella Retrum	Third Team All-Star

=== Hockey Humanitarian Award ===
- 2003– Jenny Agnew, Nominee
- 2005– Kami Cote, Nominee
- 2006– Abby Kaknes, Nominee
- 2014– Danielle Rancourt, Finalist

=== Sarah Devens Award ===
- 2018– Taylor Willard

=== National Strength & Conditioning All-American ===
- 2006– Gabe Worzella
- 2007– Kristen Norris

=== New England Hockey Writers Division l All-Star ===
- 2013– Roxanne Douville
- 2014– Roxanne Douville
- 2014– Amanda Pelkey
- 2023– Sini Karjalainen
- 2023– Theresa Schafzahl

=== New England Division l Women's Coach of the Year ===
- 2014– Jim Plumer
- 2017– Jim Plumer

=== Patty Kazmaier Memorial Award ===
- 2020– Maude Poulin-Labelle, Nominee
- 2022– Theresa Schafzahl, Top 10 Finalist

=== University of Vermont Athletic Hall of Fame ===
- 2013– Tiffany Hayes
- 2015– Kami Cote

=== Division I CCM/AHCA All-Americans ===
- 2022– Theresa Schafzahl, First Team
- 2022– Maude Poulin-Labelle, Second Team

=== All-USCHO Teams ===
- 2022– Theresa Schafzahl, Second Team

== Records ==
=== Career records ===
Metric	Number	Player
Points	145	Theresa Schafzahl (2018–23)
Goals	71	Theresa Schafzahl (2018–23)
Assists	74	Theresa Schafzahl (2018–23)
Games Played	152	Hailey Burns & Lily Humphrey (2019–24), Kristina Shanahan (2017–22)
PPG	18	Dayna Colang (2012–16)
SHG	5	Natálie Mlýnková (2020–24)
Best Save %	.933	Melanie Bouchard (1996–98)
Best Goals Against Average	1.66	Melanie Bouchard (1996–98)
Most Saves	3,221	Kami Cote (2001–05)
Most Shutouts	16	Tiffany Hayes (1999-03)
Most Wins	51	Jessie McPherson (2020–24)
Most Minutes Played	6008:14	Roxanne Douville (2010–14)
Most Games Played-Goaltender	102	Roxanne Douville (2010–14)

=== Single season records ===
Metric	Number	Player	Season
Points (Overall)	46	Theresa Schafzahl	2021–22
Points by a Defensemen	35	Maude Poulin-Labelle	2021–22
Goals (Overall)	25	Theresa Schafzahl	2021–22
Goals by a Defensemen	13	Maude Poulin-Labelle	2021–22
Game Winning Goals	6	Corinne McCool	2022–23
Power Play Goals	8	Dayna Colang & Brittany Zuback	2014–15
Short Handed Goals	2	Natálie Mlýnková & Brittany Nelson	2021–22, 2022–23 & 2007–08
Assists (Overall)	24	Theresa Schafzahl & Sini Karjalainen	2022–23
Assists by a Defenseman	24	Sini Karjalainen	2022–23
Best Save %	.940	Tiffany Hayes	2000–01
Best GAA %	1.52	Tiffany Hayes	1999–00
Most Saves	1,332	Kami Cote	2003–04
Most Wins	21	Jessie McPherson	2022–23
Most Shutouts	10	Tiffany Hayes	2000–01
Most Minutes Played	2098:16	Jessie McPherson	2022–23
Fewest Goals Allowed	32	Tiffany Hayes	2000–01
Most Games Played	35	Jessie McPherson	2022–23

== Single Game records ==
=== Single Game individual records ===
Metric	Number	Player	Date
Points	6	Maude Poulin-Labelle	at Holy Cross (1/18/22)
Points by a Defenseman	6	Maude Poulin-Labelle	at Holy Cross (1/18/22)
Goals	4	Jen Bradley	vs. Boston U. (1/27/95)
Goals	4	Ève-Audrey Picard	vs. Union (10/10/17)
Goals	4	Maude Poulin-Labelle	at Holy Cross (1/18/22)
Goals by a Defenseman	4	Maude Poulin-Labelle	at Holy Cross (1/18/22)
Assists	4	Sini Karjalainen	at Merrimack (10/25/19)
Assists	4	Ceally Nottingham	vs. Conn. College (1/23/99)
Assists	4	Theresa Schafzahl	at Merrimack (11/21/21)
Assists by a Defenseman	4	Sini Karjalainen	at Merrimack (10/25/19)
Assists by a Defenseman	4	Ceally Nottingham	vs. Conn. College (1/23/99)
Saves	66	Kami Cote	at Wisconsin (10/10/03)

=== Single game team records ===
Metric	Number	Opponent	Date
Goals	9	vs. Union	2/20/99
Goals	9	at Holy Cross	1/18/22
Goals Allowed	13	vs. Harvard	11/8/03
Assists	15	at Holy Cross	1/18/22
Penalties	15	vs. Cornell	11/9/08
Largest Margin of Victory	9	vs. Union	2/20/99
Most Saves	66	at Wisconsin	10/10/03
Fewest Saves	4	vs. Trinity	2/6/99

== Catamounts in professional hockey ==
Key of colors and symbols
Color/symbol	Explanation
‡	NWHL All-Star
#	Isobel Cup Champion
§	Walter Cup Champion
+	ZhHL Champion

As of May 21, 2026

Player	Pos.	Team(s)	League(s)	Years	Championship(s)
Rachael Ade	Defense	Connecticut Whale	PHF	2017–19, 2020–21, 2022–23	
Rachael Ade	Defense	Dream Gap Tour	PWHPA	2019–20	
Rachael Ade	Defense	Metropolitan Riveters	PHF	2021–22	
Evelyne Blais-Savoie	Forward	HV71	SDHL	2025–present	
Taylor Flaherty	Defense	KRS Vanke Rays Shenzhen	ZhHL	2019–20	1 (2020)+
Jane Gervais	Goaltender	VSV Lady Hawks	EWHL	2025–present	
Alyssa Holmes	Forward	Montreal Force	PHF	2022–23	
Sini Karjalainen	Defense	Brynäs IF	SDHL	2023–24	
Sini Karjalainen	Defense	Skellefteå AIK	SDHL	2024–present	
Sammy Kolowrat	Defense	Metropolitan Riveters	PHF	2020–21	
Sammy Kolowrat	Defense	Brynäs IF	SDHL	2021–22	
Madison Litchfield	Goaltender	Boston Pride	PHF	2017–19	
Mackenzie MacNeil	Forward	Toronto Furies	CWHL	2018–19	
Mackenzie MacNeil	Forward	Hvidovre	EWHL	2019–20	
Mackenzie MacNeil	Forward	Toronto Six	PHF	2020–21	
Antonia Matzka‡	Defense	Buffalo Beauts	PHF	2022–23	
Antonia Matzka‡	Defense	SKN Sabres St. Pölten	EWHL	2023–present	
Jessie McPherson	Goaltender	Toronto Sceptres	PWHL	2025–present	
Natálie Mlýnková	Forward	Montreal Victoire	PWHL	2025–2026	1 (2026) §
Natálie Mlýnková	Forward	San Jose Sea Lions	PWHL	2026–present	
Tynka Pátková	Forward	Linköping HC	SDHL	2023–25	
Amanda Pelkey‡	Forward	Boston Pride	PHF	2015–19	1 (2016)#
Amanda Pelkey‡	Forward	Dream Gap Tour	PWHPA	2019–22	
Amanda Pelkey‡	Forward	Metropolitan Riveters	PHF	2022–23	
Amanda Pelkey‡	Forward	Boston Fleet	PWHL	2023–2025	
Maude Poulin-Labelle	Defense	Toronto Sceptres	PWHL	2023–24	
Maude Poulin-Labelle	Defense	Brynäs IF	SDHL	2024–present	
Gina Repaci	Defense	Markham Thunder	CWHL	2018–19	
Theresa Schafzahl	Forward	Boston Fleet	PWHL	2023–2026	
Theresa Schafzahl	Forward	Seattle Torrent	PWHL	2026–present	
Kristina Shanahan	Forward	Montreal Force	PHF	2022–23	
Blanka Škodová	Goaltender	AIK	SDHL	2023–24	
Blanka Škodová	Goaltender	Skellefteå AIK	SDHL	2024–present	
Blanka Škodová	Goaltender	Leksands IF	SDHL	2025–present	
Alaina Tanski	Forward	HK Budapest	DFEL	2025–present	
Saana Valkama	Forward	Linköping HC	SDHL	2019–20	
Saana Valkama	Forward	Leksands IF	SDHL	2020–2021	
Saana Valkama	Forward	AIK	SDHL	2021–2023	
Taylor Willard	Defense	Les Canadiennes de Montréal	CWHL	2018–19	
Brittany Zuback	Forward	Toronto Furies	CWHL	2017–19	
Brittany Zuback	Forward	Dream Gap Tour	PWHPA	2021–22	

== Olympians ==
Year	Country	Player	Result
2010	Sweden	Klara Myrén	4th
2018	United States	Amanda Pelkey	Gold
2022	Czech Republic	Sammy Kolowrat	7th
2022	Czech Republic	Natálie Mlýnková	7th
2022	Czech Republic	Tynka Pátková	7th
2022	Czech Republic	Blanka Škodová	7th
2022	Denmark	Sofie Skott	10th
2022	Finland	Sini Karjalainen	Bronze
2026	Czech Republic	Natálie Mlýnková	5th
2026	Finland	Sini Karjalainen	6th
2026	France	Julia Mesplède	10th

Chelsea Rapin, who played for the team from 2008 to 2012, was a referee for the women's tournament in the 2022 Winter Olympics.

== International players ==
=== Players at the top level ===
Year	Country	Player	Result
2008	Sweden	Klara Myrén	5th
2009	Sweden	Klara Myrén	4th
2012	Finland	Saana Valkama	4th
2012	Sweden	Klara Myrén	5th
2013	Czech Republic	Sammy Kolowrat	8th
2016	Czech Republic	Sammy Kolowrat	6th
2016	Czech Republic	Blanka Škodová	6th
2016	Finland	Saana Valkama	4th
2016	United States	Amanda Pelkey	Silver
2017	Czech Republic	Sammy Kolowrat	8th
2017	Czech Republic	Blanka Škodová	8th
2017	Finland	Saana Valkama	Bronze
2017	United States	Amanda Pelkey	Gold
2019	Czech Republic	Sammy Kolowrat	6th
2019	Czech Republic	Natálie Mlýnková	6th
2021	Czech Republic	Sammy Kolowrat	7th
2021	Czech Republic	Natálie Mlýnková	7th
2021	Czech Republic	Tynka Pátková	7th
2021	Denmark	Sofie Skott	10th
2021	Finland	Sini Karjalainen	Bronze
2022	Czech Republic	Tynka Pátková	Bronze
2022	Czech Republic	Natálie Mlýnková	Bronze
2022	Czech Republic	Blanka Škodová	Bronze
2022	Denmark	Sofie Skott	10th
2022	Finland	Sini Karjalainen	6th
2022	Finland	Krista Parkkonen	6th
2023	Czech Republic	Natálie Mlýnková	Bronze
2023	Czech Republic	Tynka Pátková	Bronze
2023	Czech Republic	Blanka Škodová	Bronze
2023	Finland	Sini Karjalainen	5th
2023	Finland	Krista Parkkonen	5th
2024	Czech Republic	Natálie Mlýnková	4th
2024	Czech Republic	Blanka Škodová	4th
2024	Denmark	Sofie Skott	10th
2024	Finland	Krista Parkkonen	Bronze
2025	Czech Republic	Natálie Mlýnková	4th
2025	Finland	Krista Parkkonen	Bronze

=== Players at the Division 1A level ===
Year	Country	Player	Result
2016	Austria	Theresa Schafzahl	3rd
2017	Austria	Theresa Schafzahl	2nd
2018	Austria	Theresa Schafzahl	2nd
2019	Austria	Theresa Schafzahl	4th
2022	Austria	Theresa Schafzahl	4th
2022	France	Julia Mesplède	1st
2023	Denmark	Sofie Skott	2nd
2024	Austria	Theresa Schafzahl	4th
2024	France	Julia Mesplède	3rd
2025	Austria	Theresa Schafzahl	1st
2025	Denmark	Sofie Skott	2nd
2025	France	Julia Mesplède	4th
2026	France	Julia Mesplède	1st

Chelsea Rapin, who played for the team from 2008 to 2012, was a referee for the women's tournament in the 2021, 2023, and 2024 championships. She was also a referee for the 2025 IIHF Women's World Championship Division I.
