= 2024–25 Vermont Catamounts women's ice hockey season =

NCAA Division I women's hockey season

- Conference: WHEA
- Home ice: Gutterson Fieldhouse

Rankings
- USA Today: NR
- USCHO.com: NR

Record
- Overall: 9–25–2
- Conference: 7–18–2
- Home: 5–12–0
- Road: 4–13–2

Coaches and captains
- Head coach: Jim Plumer
- Assistant coaches: Kevin Dessart; Victoria Blake
- Captain(s): Maddy Skelton; Alaina Tanski
- Alternate captain: Anna Podein

The 2024–25 Vermont Catamounts women's ice hockey season represented the University of Vermont during the 2024–25 NCAA Division I women's ice hockey season.

== Offseason ==
=== Recruiting ===
Player	Position	Class	Previous school
Kyla Bent	D	Graduate	New Hampshire
Maisey Bojarski	F	Incoming freshman	
Jane Gervais	G	Redshirt senior	Wisconsin
Oona Havana	F	Incoming freshman	
Josie Hemp	D	Redshirt freshman	Minnesota
Ashley Kokavec	D	Sophomore	Maine
Mya Lawrence	F	Incoming freshman	
Grace Nelles	F	Graduate	Mercyhurst

=== Departures ===
Player	Position	Class	Destination
Hailey Burns	F	Graduated	
Lily Humphrey	F	Graduated	
Sara Levesque	D	Graduated	
Jessie McPherson	G	Graduate	Minnesota State
Bella Parento	D	Graduate	St. Lawrence
Krista Parkkonen	D	Junior	Minnesota
Natálie Mlýnková	F	Graduate	Minnesota

== Regular season ==
=== Standings ===
2024–25 WHEA standings
	Conference							Overall					
	GP	W	L	T	PTS	GF	GA	GP	W	L	T	GF	GA
#15 UConn †	27	19	6	2	58	62	38	36	22	12	2	80	60
#13 Boston University *	27	18	7	2	57	72	43	38	24	12	2	95	75
#11 Boston College	27	16	9	2	51	79	50	36	21	13	2	104	80
Providence	27	16	9	2	49	74	61	35	20	12	3	100	74
Northeastern	27	15	11	1	46	61	49	37	22	14	1	89	68
Maine	27	10	14	3	38	51	57	35	11	21	3	62	101
New Hampshire	27	11	14	2	34	54	65	35	15	17	3	70	77
Vermont	27	7	18	2	27	40	67	36	9	25	2	51	103
Holy Cross	25	6	17	4	25	34	59	34	10	20	4	54	73
Merrimack	27	5	18	4	20	48	86	36	9	23	4	66	106
Championship: March 8, 2025 † indicates conference regular season champion;* indicates conference tournament champion Rankings: USCHO.com; updated March 13, 2025

=== Schedule ===
As of March 2, 2025.

Date	Time	Opponent^{#}	Rank^{#}	Site	Decision	Result	Attendance	Record
Regular Season
Oct 4	6:00	at #3 Clarkson*		Cheel Arena • Potsdam, NY	Sydney Correa	L 2–6	898	0–1–0
Oct 5	3:00	at #3 Clarkson*		Cheel Arena • Potsdam, NY	Jane Gervais	L 1–5	1060	0–2–0
Oct 11	6:00	Merrimack		Gutterson Fieldhouse • Burlington, VT	Gervais	L 2–3	508	0–3–0 (0–1–0)
Oct 12	6:00	Merrimack		Gutterson Fieldhouse • Burlington, VT	Ellie Simmons	L 2–3	416	0–4–0 (0–2–0)
Oct 18	6:00	#7 St. Lawrence*		Gutterson Fieldhouse • Burlington, VT	Gervais	W 1–0	494	1–4–0
Oct 19	2:00	#7 St. Lawrence*		Gutterson Fieldhouse • Burlington, VT	Gervais	L 0–5	499	1–5–0
Oct 25	6:00	at New Hampshire		Whittemore Center • Durham, NH	Gervais	W 4–3	404	2–5–0 (1–2–0)
Oct 26	3:00	at New Hampshire		Whittemore Center • Durham, NH	Gervais	L 2–3 ^{OT}	688	2–6–0 (1–3–0)
Nov 1	2:00	at Maine		Alfond Arena • Orono, ME	Gervais	L 1–5	210	2–7–0 (1–4–0)
Nov 2	2:00	at Maine		Alfond Arena • Orono, ME	Gervais	W 2–1	251	3–7–0 (2–4–0)
Nov 9	1:00	Holy Cross		Gutterson Fieldhouse • Burlington, VT	Simmons	L 1–2 ^{OT}	680	3–8–0 (2–5–0)
Nov 15	12:00	at Providence		Schneider Arena • Providence, RI	Gervais	T 1–1 ^{SOL}	210	3–8–1 (2–5–1)
Nov 16	12:00	at Providence		Schneider Arena • Providence, RI	Gervais	T 0–0 ^{SOW}	182	3–8–2 (2–5–2)
Nov 20	6:00	Union*		Gutterson Fieldhouse • Burlington, VT	Gervais	L 0–1	291	3–9–2
Nov 22	6:00	New Hampshire		Gutterson Fieldhouse • Burlington, VT	Gervais	L 0–1	516	3–10–2 (2–6–2)
Nov 24	2:00	Maine		Gutterson Fieldhouse • Burlington, VT	Gervais	L 1–3	451	3–11–2 (2–7–2)
Nov 29	6:00	at #4 Minnesota Duluth*		Amsoil Arena • Duluth, MN	Gervais	L 0–4	x	3–12–2
Nov 30	3:00	at #4 Minnesota Duluth*		Amsoil Arena • Duluth, MN	Gervais	L 0–0	1,235	3–13–2
Dec 6	2:00	at Merrimack		Lawler Rink • North Andover, MA	Gervais	W 2–1	256	4–13–2 (3–7–2)
Jan 3	6:00	Providence		Gutterson Fieldhouse • Burlington, VT	Gervais	L 3–5	524	4–14–2 (3–8–2)
Jan 5	3:00	at #15 Connecticut		Toscano Family Ice Forum • Storrs, CT	Gervais	L 2–3	717	4–15–2 (3–9–2)
Jan 10	6:00	#13 Boston University		Gutterson Fieldhouse • Burlington, VT	Gervais	L 1–2	601	4–16–2 (3–10–2)
Jan 11	3:00	#13 Boston University		Gutterson Fieldhouse • Burlington, VT	Correa	W 3–2	472	5–16–2 (4–10–2)
Jan 17	6:00	at #12 Boston College		Conte Forum • Chestnut Hill, MA	Gervais	L 0–3	400	5–17–2 (4–11–2)
Jan 24	6:00	#14 Connecticut		Gutterson Fieldhouse • Burlington, VT	Correa	L 2–3 ^{ot}	497	5–18–2 (4–12–2)
Jan 25	6:00	#14 Connecticut		Gutterson Fieldhouse • Burlington, VT	Gervais	L 0–1	2,212	5–19–2 (4–13–2)
Jan 31	6:00	at #14 Northeastern		Matthews Arena • Boston, MA	Correa	W 1–0	882	6–19–2 (5–13–2)
Feb 1	3:00	at Boston University		Walter Brown Arena • Boston, MA	Gervais	L 1–4	584	6–20–2 (5–14–2)
Feb 6	6:00	at #15 Boston College		Conte Forum • Chestnut Hill, MA	Correa	L 1–7	257	6–21–2 (5–15–2)
Feb 8	6:00	#15 Boston College		Gutterson Fieldhouse • Burlington, VT	Gervais	W 3–2	784	7–21–2 (6–15–2)
Feb 15	6:00	at Holy Cross		Hart Center • Worcester, MA	Correa	L 0–1	439	7–22–2 (6–16–2)
Feb 16	3:00	at Holy Cross		Hart Center • Worcester, MA	Gervais	L 1–3	413	7–23–2 (6–17–2)
Feb 21	2:00	#14 Northeastern		Gutterson Fieldhouse • Burlington, VT	Gervais	W 3–2	308	8–23–2 (7–17–2)
Feb 22	2:00	#14 Northeastern		Gutterson Fieldhouse • Burlington, VT	Correa	L 1–3	523	8–24–2 (7–18–2)
Hockey East Tournament
Feb 28	6:00	#9 Holy Cross	#8	Gutterson Fieldhouse • Burlington, VT (Hockey East First Round)	Correa	W 2–3 ^{ot}	365	9–24–2
Mar 1	4:00	#2/14 Boston University	#8	Walter Brown Arena • Boston, MA (Hockey East Quarterfinals)	Correa	L 3–4 ^{OT}	1,339	9–25–2
*Non-conference game. ^{#}Rankings from USCHO.com Poll.

=== Statistics ===
As of April 10, 2025.

==== Scoring ====
Name	Position	Overall							Conference						
Name	Position	GP	G	A	PTS	PIM	GW	PP	GP	G	A	PTS	PIM	GW	PP
Lara Beecher	F	36	6	11	17	23	1	2	27	4	9	13	19	0	2
Ashley Kokavec	D	36	5	11	16	10	1	0	27	5	10	15	2	1	0
Rose-Marie Brochu	F	35	6	9	15	4	0	1	26	4	7	11	4	0	1
Oona Havana	F	36	3	9	12	6	0	0	27	2	6	8	2	0	0
Kyla Bent	D	36	2	9	11	16	1	1	27	1	6	7	14	1	0
Evelyne Blais-Savoie	F	36	6	3	9	28	2	1	27	5	2	7	22	2	1
Maddy Skelton	F	25	4	3	7	8	0	3	20	2	3	5	8	0	1
Grace Nelles	F	36	4	3	7	6	2	1	27	4	2	6	6	2	1
Kaylee Lewis	F	26	1	6	7	12	0	0	19	1	4	5	12	0	0
Natalie Zarcone	D	30	2	4	6	8	0	1	21	2	3	5	4	0	1
Julia Mesplede	F	31	2	4	6	0	0	0	22	2	3	5	0	0	0
Hailey Eikos	D	36	3	2	5	13	0	2	27	2	2	4	13	0	1
McKenzie Cerrato	F	35	1	4	5	4	1	0	26	1	4	5	4	1	0
Josie Hemp	D	36	1	3	4	28	0	0	27	1	2	3	18	0	0
Cecilia DesLauriers	F	33	3	0	3	27	1	0	26	2	0	2	10	0	0
Alaina Tanski	F	19	2	0	2	12	0	0	12	2	0	2	8	0	0
Sydney Correa	G	9	0	1	1	2	0	0	6	0	1	1	2	0	0
Anna Podein	D	35	0	1	1	2	0	0	26	0	1	1	2	0	0
Brooke George	D	32	0	0	0	4	0	0	25	0	0	0	4	0	0
Maisey Bojarski	F	27	0	0	0	0	0	0	21	0	0	0	0	0	0
Sofie Skott	D	19	0	0	0	2	0	0	17	0	0	0	2	0	0
Ezra Oien	F	26	0	0	0	4	0	0	17	0	0	0	4	0	0
Mya Lawrence	F	10	0	0	0	0	0	0	8	0	0	0	0	0	0

==== Goaltending ====
Name	Overall					Conference				
Name	GP	Record	G.AA	SH	SV%	GP	Record	G.AA	SH	SV%
Jane Gervais	26	6–17–2	2.59	2	.910	20	5–12–2	2.31	1	.914
Sydney Correa	9	3–6–0	2.82	0	.808	6	2–4–0	2.33	0	.919
Ellie Simmons	5	0–2–0	3.44	0	.863	4	0–2–0	2.23	0	.865

== Roster ==
2024-2025 Women's Ice Hockey Roster
No.	Name	Position	Year	Height	Hometown	Previous Team
4	Natalie Zarcone	D	SO	5'5	Huntington, New York	Northwood School
6	Evelyne Blais-Savoie	F	SR	5'9	San Jose, California	Meijer AAA Hockey 19U
7	McKenzie Cerrato	F	SO	5'3	Malden, Massachusetts	Austin Prep
8	Anna Podein	D	RS JR	5'8	Minneapolis, Minnesota	Benilde-St. Margaret's
9	Julia Mesplède	F	JR	5'2	Bordeaux, France	France National Team
10	Lara Beecher	F	JR	5'5	Buffalo, New York	Philadelphia Junior Flyers
11	Kaylee Lewis	F	SO	5'7	McKinney, Texas	Philadelphia Junior Flyers
12	Maddy Skelton	F	GR	5'6	Isanti, Minnesota	North Wright County
13	Maisey Bojarski	F	FR	5'7	Appleton, Wisconsin	NAHA White
15	Josie Hemp	D	RS FR	5'9	Chanhassen, Minnesota	Minnesota
16	Mya Lawrence	F	FR	5'5	Calgary, Alberta	Shawnigan Lake School
17	Brooke George	D	SO	5'5	East Montpelier, Vermont	Bishop Kearney Selects
19	Cecilia DesLauriers	F	FR	5'0	St. Albans, Vermont	Mid Fairfield CT Stars
20	Kyla Bent	D	GR	5'4	Halifax, Nova Scotia	New Hampshire
23	Ezra Oien	F	SO	5'7	Owatonna, Minnesota	Owatonna High School
24	Rose-Marie Brochu	F	SO	5'8	Lévis, Québec	Cégep Limoilou Titans
27	Sofie Skott	D	JR	5'8	Herning, Denmark	Denmark National Team
30	Jane Gervais	G	RS SR	5'8	Valcourt, Quebec	Wisconsin
35	Ellie Simmons	G	RS SO	5'8	Buffalo, New York	Nichols School
38	Sydney Correa	G	SR	5'6	Georgetown, Massachusetts	Brooks School
43	Alaina Tanski	F	SR	5'4	Hermantown, Minnesota	Pittsburgh Penguins Elite
44	Grace Nelles	F	GR	5'10	St. Anns, Ontario	Mercyhurst
51	Oona Havana	F	FR	5'7	Turku, Finland	Oulun Kärpät
55	Hailey Eikos	D	FR	5'3	Brooklyn Park, Minnesota	Osseo/Park Center
91	Ashley Kokavec	D	SO	5'4	Parkland, Florida	Maine
