= 2026–27 Vermont Catamounts women's ice hockey season =

NCAA Division I women's hockey season

- Conference: WHEA
- Home ice: Gutterson Fieldhouse

Record
- Overall: 1–1–0
- Conference: 0–0–0
- Home: 1–1–0
- Road: 0–0–0
- Neutral: 0–0–0

Coaches and captains
- Head coach: Jim Plumer
- Assistant coaches: Victoria Blake; Erik Strand; Hugo Turcotte
- Captain(s): Rose-Marie Brochu; Natalie Zarcone
- Alternate captain(s): Stella Retrum; Brooke George

The 2026–27 Vermont Catamounts women's ice hockey season will represent the University of Vermont during the 2026–27 NCAA Division I women's ice hockey season. The team will be coached by Jim Plumer in his 15th season.

== Offseason ==
=== Recruiting ===
Player	Position	Class	Previous school
Tara Bach	Goaltender	Sophomore	Mercyhurst
Zoe Charland	Forward	Incoming freshman	
Maria Gray	Forward	Incoming freshman	
Lexie Hatoum	Forward	Incoming freshman	
Gracesyn Louis	Forward	Incoming freshman	
Linnea Misner	Defense	Sophomore	Robert Morris
Addyson Peel	Defense	Incoming freshman	

=== Departures ===
Player	Position	Class	Destination
Maisey Bojarski	Forward	Junior	Left program
Ashley Kokavec	Defense	Senior	Penn State
Darci Matson	Forward	Graduated	
Julia Mesplède	Forward	Lausanne HC Féminin	
Anna Podein	Defense	Graduated	
Sofie Skott	Defense	EKU Mannheim	

=== PWHL Draft ===
Round	Player	Position	Team
6	Lara Beecher	Forward	Minnesota Frost

== Schedule ==
Date	Time	Opponent^{#}	Rank^{#}	Site	Decision	Result	Attendance	Record	Ref
Regular Season
October 2	11:00	#7 Minnesota Duluth*		Gutterson Fieldhouse • Burlington, VT	Bach	W 3-0	1,811	1-0-0	
October 3	1:00	#7 Minnesota Duluth*		Gutterson Fieldhouse • Burlington, VT	Bach	L 2-3 ^{OT}	670	1-1-0	
October 9	7:00	at Franklin Pierce*		Jason Ritchie Ice Arena • Rindge, NH					
October 10	4:00	at Franklin Pierce*		Jason Ritchie Ice Arena • Rindge, NH					
October 16	6:00	at Cornell*		Lynah Rink • Ithaca, NY					
October 17	3:00	at Cornell*		Lynah Rink • Ithaca, NY					
October 30	2:00	at Boston College		Conte Forum • Chestnut Hill, MA					
October 31	2:00	at Boston College		Conte Forum • Chestnut Hill, MA					
November 6	6:00	Northeastern		Gutterson Fieldhouse • Burlington, VT					
November 7	3:00	Northeastern		Gutterson Fieldhouse • Burlington, VT					
November 13	TBA	New Hampshire		Whittemore Center • Durham, NH					
November 14	TBA	New Hampshire		Whittemore Center • Durham, NH					
November 20	6:00	Connecticut		Gutterson Fieldhouse • Burlington, VT					
November 21	3:00	Connecticut		Gutterson Fieldhouse • Burlington, VT					
November 27	2:00	St. Cloud State*		Gutterson Fieldhouse • Burlington, VT					
November 28	2:00	St. Cloud State*		Gutterson Fieldhouse • Burlington, VT					
December 4	TBA	at Holy Cross		Hart Center • Worcester, MA					
December 5	TBA	at Holy Cross		Hart Center • Worcester, MA					
December 11	6:00	Dartmouth*		Gutterson Fieldhouse • Burlington, VT					
December 12	TBA	at Dartmouth*		Thompson Arena • Hanover, NH					
January 8	2:00	Merrimack		Gutterson Fieldhouse • Burlington, VT					
January 9	2:00	Merrimack		Gutterson Fieldhouse • Burlington, VT					
January 15	TBA	at Maine		Alfond Arena • Orono, ME					
January 16	TBA	at Maine		Alfond Arena • Orono, ME					
January 22	6:00	Boston University		Gutterson Fieldhouse • Burlington, VT					
January 23	3:00	Boston University		Gutterson Fieldhouse • Burlington, VT					
January 29	TBA	at Providence		Schneider Arena • Providence, RI					
January 30	TBA	at Providence		Schneider Arena • Providence, RI					
February 4	6:00	Holy Cross		Gutterson Fieldhouse • Burlington, VT					
February 6	TBA	Maine		Gutterson Fieldhouse • Burlington, VT					
February 12	6:00	Connecticut		Toscano Family Ice Forum • Storrs, CT					
February 13	TBA	Merrimack		Lawler Rink • North Andover, MA					
February 18	6:00	Providence		Gutterson Fieldhouse • Burlington, VT					
February 20	4:00	Boston University		Walter Brown Arena • Boston, MA					
*Non-conference game. ^{#}Rankings from USCHO.com Poll.

== Roster ==
As of August 17, 2026.

No.	Nat.	Player	Class	Pos	Height	DoB	Hometown	Previous team
2	(United States)	Addyson Peel	Freshman	D	5' 11" (1.8 m)	2007-12-24	Scarborough, Maine	New Hampton School
4	(United States)	Natalie Zarcone (C)	Senior	D	5' 5" (1.65 m)	2004-06-15	Huntington, New York	Northwood School
5	(United States)	Sophia DeAnzeris	Sophomore	D	5' 11" (1.8 m)	2006-11-19	Saratoga, New York	Northwood School
6	(United States)	Maria Gray	Freshman	D	5' 6" (1.68 m)	2007-08-07	Monona, Wisconsin	Phillips Exeter Academy
10	(United States)	Stella Retrum (A)	Senior	F	5' 7" (1.7 m)	2005-03-25	Maple Grove, Minnesota	Penn State
11	(United States)	Kaylee Lewis	Senior	F	5' 7" (1.7 m)	2004-07-06	McKinney, Texas	Philadelphia Jr. Flyers
12	(United States)	Lauren O'Hara	Senior	F	5' 11" (1.8 m)	2005-03-02	Blaine, Minnesota	Minnesota
15	(United States)	Josie Hemp	Junior (RS)	D	5' 9" (1.75 m)	2004-12-16	Chanhassen, Minnesota	Minnesota
16	(Canada)	Mya Lawrence	Junior	F	5' 5" (1.65 m)	2006-09-08	Okotoks, Alberta	Shawinigan
17	(United States)	Brooke George (A)	Senior	D	5' 5" (1.65 m)	2004-07-18	East Montpelier, Vermont	Bishop Kearney Selects
19	(United States)	Cecilia DesLauriers	Senior	F	5' 0" (1.52 m)	2004-01-12	St. Albans, Vermont	Mid Fairfield CT Stars
21	(Canada)	Zoe Charland	Freshman	F	5' 0" (1.52 m)	2008-08-21	Sherbrooke, Québec	Stanstead College
23	(United States)	Ezra Oien	Senior	F	5' 7" (1.7 m)	2004-11-23	Owatonna, Minnesota	Owatonna High School
24	(Canada)	Rose-Marie Brochu (C)	Senior	F	5' 8" (1.73 m)	2003-04-27	Lévis, Québec	Cégep Limoilou Titans
29	(United States)	Gracesyn Louis	Freshman	D	5' 8" (1.73 m)	2008-06-000	Redondo Beach, California	Lovell Academy
30	(United States)	Lily Prendergast	Sophomore	G	5' 8" (1.73 m)	2004-10-13	Hanover, Massachusetts	Etobicoke Dolphins
31	(Canada)	Zoe Cliche	Sophomore	G	5' 7" (1.7 m)	2007-00-00	Ottawa, Ontario	Nepean Wildcats
32	(Canada)	Tara Bach	Sophomore	G	5' 10" (1.78 m)	2008-02-13	Oakville, Ontario	Mercyhurst
35	(United States)	Ellie Simmons	Senior (RS)	G	5' 8" (1.73 m)	2004-01-18	Buffalo, New York	Nichols School
44	(United States)	Lila Pannacciulli	Sophomore	F	5' 6" (1.68 m)	2006-09-15	East Meadow, New York	Lovell Academy
51	(Finland)	Oona Havana	Junior	F	5' 7" (1.7 m)	2004-08-20	Turku, Finland	Kärpät
71	(Canada)	Hilary Wilkin	Sophomore	F	5' 8" (1.73 m)	2007-10-10	Halifax, Nova Scotia	Northwood School
77	(Canada)	Linnea Misner	Sophomore	F	5' 9" (1.75 m)	2007-06-10	Springfield, Manitoba	Robert Morris
88	(Canada)	Makena Lloyd-Howe	Sophomore	F	5' 5" (1.65 m)	2007-02-02	Tumbler Ridge, British Columbia	RINK Hockey Academy
92	(Canada)	Lexie Hatoum	Freshman	D	5' 5" (1.65 m)	2008-00-00	Ottawa, Ontario	U22 Ottawa Senators
93	(Canada)	Morgann Skoda	Senior	F	5' 11" (1.8 m)	2003-10-26	Montreal, Quebec	RPI

== Milestones ==
Player	Milestone	Date
Tara Bach	First start with Vermont	October 2, 2026
Tara Bach	First win with Vermont	October 2, 2026
Tara Bach	First shutout with Vermont	October 2, 2026
Linnea Misner	First point with Vermont	October 2, 2026
Kaylee Lewis	100th career game	October 2, 2026
Hilary Wilkin	First career goal	October 3, 2026
Zoe Charland	First career point	October 3, 2026
