= 2025–26 Vermont Catamounts women's ice hockey season =

NCAA Division I women's hockey season

- Conference: WHEA
- Home ice: Gutterson Fieldhouse

Record
- Overall: 16–17–5
- Conference: 9–11–4
- Home: 7–11–2
- Road: 8–4–2
- Neutral: 1–2–1

Coaches and captains
- Head coach: Jim Plumer
- Assistant coaches: Erik Strand; Victoria Blake; Danielle Slominski
- Captain: Anna Podein
- Alternate captain(s): Rose-Marie Brochu; Natalie Zarcone

The 2025–26 Vermont Catamounts women's ice hockey season represented the University of Vermont during the 2025–26 NCAA Division I women's ice hockey season. The team was coached by Jim Plumer in his 14th season.

== Offseason ==
=== Recruiting ===
| Player | Position | Class | Previous school |
|---|---|---|---|
| Zoe Cliché | Goaltender | Incoming freshman | |
| Sophia DeAnzeris | Defense | Incoming freshman | |
| Makena Lloyd-Howe | Forward | Incoming freshman | |
| Darci Matson | Forward | Graduate | Aurora |
| Lauren O'Hara | Forward | Junior | Minnesota |
| Lila Pannacciulli | Forward | Incoming freshman | |
| Lily Prendergast | Goaltender | Incoming freshman | |
| Stella Retrum | Forward | Junior | Penn State |
| Morgann Skoda | Forward | Junior | RPI |
| Hilary Wilkin | Forward | Incoming freshman | |

=== Departures ===
| Player | Position | Class | Destination |
|---|---|---|---|
| Lara Beecher | Forward | Senior | Clarkson |
| Kyla Bent | Defense | Graduated | |
| Evelyne Blais-Savoie | Forward | Graduated | |
| McKenzie Cerrato | Forward | Junior | Merrimack |
| Sydney Correa | Goaltender | Graduated | |
| Hailey Eikos | Defense | Junior | Merrimack |
| Jane Gervais | Goaltender | Graduated | |
| Grace Nelles | Forward | Graduated | |
| Maddy Skelton | Forward | Graduated | |
| Alaina Tanski | Forward | Graduated | |

=== PWHL Draft ===
| Round | Player | Position | Team |
|---|---|---|---|
| 2 | Natálie Mlýnková | Forward | Montreal Victoire |

=== Preseason ===
The Catamounts were picked to finish tied for seventh place in the Hockey East Preseason Coaches' Poll. Vermont hosted Saint Michael's College in an exhibition game on September 20 and defeated the Purple Knights 8–0. The Catamounts recorded 59 shots on goal, had eight different goal scorers, and had seen all three of their goaltenders in net.

== Standings ==
2025–26 Hockey East standings
| | Conference | | | | | | | Overall | | | | | |
| | GP | W | L | T | PTS | GF | GA | GP | W | L | T | GF | GA |
|---|---|---|---|---|---|---|---|---|---|---|---|---|---|
| #4 Northeastern † | 24 | 21 | 2 | 1 | 65 | 80 | 34 | 39 | 29 | 9 | 1 | 115 | 71 |
| #6 UConn * | 24 | 17 | 6 | 1 | 54 | 76 | 40 | 39 | 28 | 9 | 2 | 117 | 64 |
| Boston College | 24 | 14 | 9 | 1 | 42 | 72 | 56 | 35 | 16 | 18 | 1 | 88 | 99 |
| Holy Cross | 24 | 10 | 11 | 3 | 37 | 49 | 46 | 35 | 19 | 13 | 3 | 83 | 65 |
| New Hampshire | 24 | 10 | 12 | 2 | 33 | 66 | 68 | 35 | 16 | 16 | 3 | 99 | 87 |
| Vermont | 24 | 9 | 11 | 4 | 32 | 55 | 58 | 38 | 16 | 17 | 5 | 82 | 93 |
| Maine | 24 | 8 | 12 | 4 | 30 | 46 | 54 | 36 | 13 | 19 | 4 | 71 | 93 |
| Boston University | 24 | 8 | 14 | 2 | 28 | 45 | 61 | 35 | 11 | 21 | 3 | 64 | 89 |
| Providence | 24 | 8 | 14 | 2 | 25 | 45 | 72 | 35 | 11 | 22 | 2 | 63 | 112 |
| Merrimack | 24 | 4 | 18 | 2 | 15 | 36 | 80 | 35 | 7 | 24 | 4 | 61 | 113 |
Championship: March 7, 2026 † indicates conference regular season champion; * indicates conference tournament champion Rankings: USCHO.com; updated March 23, 2026

== Schedule ==
| Date | Time | Opponent^{#} | Rank^{#} | Site | Decision | Result | Attendance | Record | Ref |
Regular Season
| October 3 | 6:00 | #6 Penn State* | | Gutterson Fieldhouse • Burlington, VT | Simmons | L 3–1 | 564 | 0–1–0 | |
| October 4 | 2:00 | #6 Penn State* | | Gutterson Fieldhouse • Burlington, VT | Prendergast | L 5–3 | 395 | 0–2–0 | |
| October 10 | 6:00 | at #12 St. Lawrence* | | Appleton Arena • Canton, NY | Simmons | T 1–1 ^{SOL} | 783 | 0–2–1 | |
| October 11 | 3:00 | at #12 St. Lawrence* | | Appleton Arena • Canton, NY | Cliche | W 2–1 ^{OT} | 715 | 1–2–1 | |
| October 17 | 12:07 | vs. #1 Wisconsin* | | M&T Bank Center • Schenectady, NY (Icebreaker Semifinal) | Simmons | L 1–8 | 313 | 1–3–1 | |
| October 18 | 12:07 | vs. Saint Anselm* | | M&T Bank Center • Schenectady, NY (Icebreaker Consolation) | Cliche | W 3–1 | x | 2–3–1 | |
| October 24 | 6:00 | Franklin Pierce* | | Gutterson Fieldhouse • Burlington, VT | Simmons | W 3–0 | 394 | 3–3–1 | |
| October 25 | 3:00 | Franklin Pierce* | | Gutterson Fieldhouse • Burlington, VT | Prendergast | L 1–3 | 335 | 3–4–1 | |
| October 31 | 11:00 | Boston College | | Gutterson Fieldhouse • Burlington, VT | Simmons | W 4–3 | 1,698 | 4–4–1 (1–0–0) | |
| November 1 | 2:00 | Boston College | | Gutterson Fieldhouse • Burlington, VT | Simmons | T 0–0 ^{SOL} | 473 | 4–4–2 (1–0–1) | |
| November 7 | 1:30 | at #9 Northeastern | | Matthews Arena • Boston, MA | Simmons | L 0–3 | 412 | 4–5–2 (1–1–1) | |
| November 8 | 1:30 | at #9 Northeastern | | Matthews Arena • Boston, MA | Cliche | L 2–3 | 662 | 4–6–2 (1–2–1) | |
| November 14 | 6:00 | New Hampshire | | Gutterson Fieldhouse • Burlington, VT | Simmons | L 3–4 | 435 | 4–7–2 (1–3–1) | |
| November 15 | 3:00 | New Hampshire | | Gutterson Fieldhouse • Burlington, VT | Cliche | W 4–0 | 445 | 5–7–2 (2–3–1) | |
| November 21 | 6:00 | at #9 Connecticut | | Toscano Family Ice Forum • Storrs, CT | Simmons | L 0–4 | 486 | 5–8–2 (2–4–1) | |
| November 22 | 3:00 | at #9 Connecticut | | Toscano Family Ice Forum • Storrs, CT | Cliche | L 3–6 | 448 | 5–9–2 (2–5–1) | |
| November 28 | 6:00 | #5 Cornell* | | Gutterson Fieldhouse • Burlington, VT | Simmons | W 4–3 | 386 | 6–9–1 | |
| November 29 | 3:00 | #5 Cornell* | | Gutterson Fieldhouse • Burlington, VT | Simmons | L 1–5 | 430 | 6–10–1 | |
| December 5 | 2:00 | Holy Cross | | Gutterson Fieldhouse • Burlington, VT | Cliche | L 0–2 | 221 | 6–11–2 (2–6–1) | |
| December 6 | 2:00 | Holy Cross | | Gutterson Fieldhouse • Burlington, VT | Simmons | L 1–2 | 495 | 6–12–2 (2–7–1) | |
| January 2 | 6:00 | Dartmouth* | | Gutterson Fieldhouse • Burlington, VT | Cliche | W 1–0 | 785 | 7–12–2 | |
| January 3 | 4:00 | at Dartmouth* | | Thompson Arena • Hanover, NH | Cliche | W 2–1 | 868 | 8–12–2 | |
| January 9 | 6:00 | at Merrimack | | Lawler Rink • North Andover, MA | Cliche | W 4–1 | 229 | 9–12–2 (3–7–1) | |
| January 10 | 3:00 | at Merrimack | | Conte Forum • Chestnut Hill, MA | Cliche | T 3–3 ^{SOW} | 187 | 9–12–3 (3–7–2) | |
| January 16 | 6:00 | Maine | | Gutterson Fieldhouse • Burlington, VT | Cliche | T 2–2 ^{SOW} | 777 | 9–12–4 (3–7–3) | |
| January 17 | 2:00 | Maine | | Gutterson Fieldhouse • Burlington, VT | Cliche | W 2–1 ^{OT} | 529 | 10–12–4 (4–7–3) | |
| January 23 | 6:00 | at Boston University | | Walter Brown Arena • Boston, MA | Cliche | W 5–2 | 773 | 11–12–4 (5–7–3) | |
| January 24 | 4:00 | at Boston University | | Walter Brown Arena • Boston, MA | Cliche | W 2–1 | 750 | 12–12–4 (6–7–3) | |
| January 30 | 2:00 | Providence | | Gutterson Fieldhouse • Burlington, VT | Cliche | L 1–4 | 258 | 12–13–4 (6–8–3) | |
| January 31 | 1:00 | Providence | | Gutterson Fieldhouse • Burlington, VT | Simmons | L 3–2 | 591 | 12–14–4 (6–9–3) | |
| February 5 | 6:00 | Boston University | | Gutterson Fieldhouse • Burlington, VT | Prendergast | W 3–0 | 430 | 13–14–4 (7–9–3) | |
| February 7 | 5:00 | #5 Northeastern | | Gutterson Fieldhouse • Burlington, VT | Prendergast | L 2–3 ^{OT} | 1,710 | 13–15–4 (7–10–3) | |
| February 13 | 2:00 | at Maine | | Alfond Arena • Orono, ME | Prendergast | T 2–2 ^{SOW} | 369 | 13–15–5 (7–10–4) | |
| February 15 | 2:00 | Merrimack | | Gutterson Fieldhouse • Burlington, VT | Prendergast | L 2–3 | 490 | 13–16–5 (7–11–4) | |
| February 20 | 6:00 | at Holy Cross | | Hart Center • Worcester, MA | Prendergast | W 2–1 ^{OT} | 384 | 14–16–5 (8–11–4) | |
| February 21 | 2:00 | at New Hampshire | | Whittemore Center • Durham, NH | Prendergast | W 6–5 ^{OT} | 621 | 15–16–5 (9–11–4) | |
Hockey East Tournament
| February 28 | 1:00 | at Boston College | | Kelley Rink • Chestnut Hill, MA (Quarterfinals) | Simmons | W 3–1 | 621 | 16–16–5 | |
| March 3 | 6:00 | at #5 Northeastern | | Walter Brown Arena • Boston, MA (Semifinals) | Simmons | L 1–3 | 412 | 16–17–5 | |
*Non-conference game. ^{#}Rankings from USCHO.com Poll.

== Roster ==
As of September 16, 2025.

| No. | Nat. | Player | Class | Pos | Height | DoB | Hometown | Previous team |
|---|---|---|---|---|---|---|---|---|
| 4 | (United States) | Natalie Zarcone | Junior | D | 5' 5" (1.65 m) | 2004-06-15 | Huntington, New York | Northwood School |
| 5 | (United States) | Sophia DeAnzeris | Freshman | D | 5' 11" (1.8 m) | 2006-11-19 | Saratoga, New York | Northwood School |
| 8 | (United States) | Anna Podein | Senior (RS) | D | 5' 8" (1.73 m) | 2003-01-16 | Minneapolis, Minnesota | Benilde-St. Margaret's |
| 9 | (France) | Julia Mesplède | Senior | F | 5' 2" (1.57 m) | 2002-10-12 | Bordeaux, France | Vermont Academy |
| 10 | (United States) | Stella Retrum | Junior | F | 5' 7" (1.7 m) | 2005-03-25 | Maple Grove, Minnesota | Penn State |
| 11 | (United States) | Kaylee Lewis | Junior | F | 5' 7" (1.7 m) | 2004-07-06 | McKinney, Texas | Philadelphia Jr. Flyers |
| 12 | (United States) | Lauren O'Hara | Junior | F | 5' 11" (1.8 m) | 2005-03-02 | Blaine, Minnesota | Minnesota |
| 13 | (United States) | Maisey Bojarski | Sophomore | F | 5' 7" (1.7 m) | 2006-01-09 | Appleton, Wisconsin | NAHA |
| 15 | (United States) | Josie Hemp | Sophomore (RS) | D | 5' 9" (1.75 m) | 2004-12-16 | Chanhassen, Minnesota | Minnesota |
| 16 | (Canada) | Mya Lawrence | Sophomore | F | 5' 5" (1.65 m) | 2006-09-08 | Okotoks, Alberta | Shawinigan |
| 17 | (United States) | Brooke George | Junior | D | 5' 5" (1.65 m) | 2004-07-18 | East Montpelier, Vermont | Bishop Kearney Selects |
| 18 | (United States) | Darci Matson | Graduate | F | 5' 4" (1.63 m) | 2003-05-30 | Wasilla, Alaska | Aurora |
| 19 | (United States) | Cecilia DesLauriers | Junior | F | 5' 0" (1.52 m) | 2004-01-12 | St. Albans, Vermont | Mid Fairfield CT Stars |
| 23 | (United States) | Ezra Oien | Junior | F | 5' 7" (1.7 m) | 2004-11-23 | Owatonna, Minnesota | Owatonna High School |
| 24 | (Canada) | Rose-Marie Brochu | Junior | F | 5' 8" (1.73 m) | 2003-04-27 | Lévis, Québec | Cégep Limoilou Titans |
| 27 | (Denmark) | Sofie Skott | Senior | D | 5' 8" (1.73 m) | 2002-06-14 | Herning, Denmark | Malmö Redhawks |
| 30 | (United States) | Lily Prendergast | Freshman | G | 5' 8" (1.73 m) | 2004-10-13 | Hanover, Massachusetts | Etobicoke Dolphins |
| 31 | (Canada) | Zoe Cliche | Freshman | G | 5' 7" (1.7 m) | 2007-00-00 | Ottawa, Ontario | Nepean Wildcats |
| 35 | (United States) | Ellie Simmons | Junior (RS) | G | 5' 8" (1.73 m) | 2004-01-18 | Buffalo, New York | Nichols School |
| 44 | (United States) | Lila Pannacciulli | Freshman | F | 5' 6" (1.68 m) | 2006-09-15 | East Meadow, New York | Lovell Academy |
| 51 | (Finland) | Oona Havana | Sophomore | F | 5' 7" (1.7 m) | 2004-08-20 | Turku, Finland | Kärpät |
| 71 | (Canada) | Hilary Wilkin | Freshman | F | 5' 8" (1.73 m) | 2007-10-10 | Halifax, Nova Scotia | Northwood School |
| 88 | (Canada) | Makena Lloyd-Howe | Freshman | F | 5' 5" (1.65 m) | 2007-02-02 | Tumbler Ridge, British Columbia | RINK Hockey Academy |
| 91 | (United States) | Ashley Kokavec | Junior | D | 5' 4" (1.63 m) | 2005-01-01 | Parkland, Florida | Maine |
| 93 | (Canada) | Morgann Skoda | Junior | F | 5' 11" (1.8 m) | 2003-10-26 | Montreal, Quebec | RPI |

== Awards and honors ==
- Zoe Cliche: Hockey East Rookie of the Week (October 14, 2025)
- Stella Returm: University of Vermont Student-Athlete of the Week (October 22, 2025)
- Ellie Simmons: Hockey East Goaltender of the Week (November 4, 2025)
- Zoe Cliche: Hockey East Defender of the Week (November 18, 2025)
- Julia Mesplède: Hockey East Player of the Week (December 2, 2025)
- Zoe Cliche: Hockey East Rookie of the Week (January 6, 2026)
- Oona Havana: Hockey East Player of the Week (January 13, 2026)
- Josie Hemp: Hockey East Defender of the Week (January 13, 2026)
- Ashley Kokavec: Hockey East Defender of the Week (January 20, 2026)
- Kaylee Lewis: University of Vermont Student-Athlete of the Week (January 22, 2026)
- Stella Retrum: Hockey East Player of the Week (January 27, 2026)
- Zoe Cliche: Hockey East Rookie of the Week (January 27, 2026)
- Stella Retrum: Hockey East Player of the Month (January 2026)
- Lily Prendergast: Hockey East Rookie of the Week (February 10, 2026)
- Josie Hemp: Hockey East Third Team
- Stella Retrum: Hockey East Third Team
- Ellie Simmons: Hockey East Goaltender of the Week (March 3, 2026)

== Milestones ==
| Player | Milestone | Date |
|---|---|---|
| Lily Prendergast | First collegiate start | October 4, 2025 |
| Makena Lloyd-Howe | First collegiate goal | October 4, 2025 |
| Darci Matson | First assist with Vermont | October 4, 2025 |
| Lauren O'Hara | First goal with Vermont | October 4, 2025 |
| Morgann Skoda | First goal with Vermont | October 10, 2025 |
| Lauren O'Hara | First assist with Vermont | October 10, 2025 |
| Zoe Cliche | First collegiate start | October 11, 2025 |
| Zoe Cliche | First collegiate win | October 11, 2025 |
| Stella Retrum | First goal with Vermont | October 17, 2025 |
| Sophia DeAnzeris | First collegiate point | October 18, 2025 |
| Maisey Bojarski | First collegiate point | October 31, 2025 |
| Mya Lawrence | First collegiate goal | November 8, 2025 |
| Zoe Cliche | First collegiate shutout | November 15, 2025 |
| Darci Matson | First goal with Vermont | January 23, 2026 |
| Lily Prendergast | First collegiate win | February 5, 2026 |
| Lily Prendergast | First collegiate shutout | February 5, 2026 |
| Oona Havana | First collegiate hat trick | February 21, 2026 |
