= 2002–03 Vermont Catamounts women's ice hockey season =

- Conference: ECAC Hockey
- Home ice: Gutterson Fieldhouse

Rankings
- USA Today/USA Hockey Magazine: Not ranked
- USCHO.com/CBS College Sports: Not ranked

Record
- Overall: 3-25-2
- Home: 1-10 -1
- Road: 2-13-1

Coaches and captains
- Head coach: Dennis Miller

The 2002–03 Vermont Catamounts season was their first season in the ECAC Division I. Led by head coach Dennis Miller, the Catamounts had 3 victories, compared to 25 defeats and 2 ties. Their conference record was 0 victories, 15 defeats and 1 tie.

== Regular season ==
=== Schedule ===
Date	Opponent	Score	Result
Oct. 10	at New Hampshire	4-0	L
Oct. 18	at Boston College	3-2	W
Oct. 19	at Providence	6-0	L
Oct. 20	at Northeastern	3-0	L
Oct. 25	Maine	4-1	L
Oct. 26	Maine	4-0	L
Nov. 1	at Dartmouth*	7-0	L
Nov. 2	Union	4-0	W
Nov. 8	Harvard*	13-0	L
Nov. 9	Brown*	3-0	L
Nov. 15	at Cornell*	1-1	T
Nov. 16	at Colgate*	5-0	L
Nov. 20	Dartmouth*	8-0	L
Dec. 28	at Niagara	4-0	L
Jan. 3	at Mercyhurst	5-0	L
Jan. 4	at Mercyhurst	6-1	L
Jan. 6	at North Dakota	8-2	L
Jan. 7	at North Dakota	2-1	W
Jan. 24	Wayne State	2-0	L
Jan. 24	Wayne State	3-3	T
Jan. 31	Princeton*	4-0	L
Feb. 1	Yale*	3-0	L
Feb. 7	at Brown*	4-1	L
Feb. 8	at Harvard*	9-1	L
Feb. 15	Colgate*	3-0	L
Feb. 16	Cornell*	4-2	L
Feb. 22	St. Lawrence*	11-0	L
Feb. 23	St. Lawrence*	7-0	L
Mar. 1	at Yale*	1-0	L
Mar. 2	at Princeton*	5-0	L
