= 2003–04 Vermont Catamounts women's ice hockey season =

- Conference: ECAC Hockey
- Home ice: Gutterson Fieldhouse

Rankings
- USA Today/USA Hockey Magazine: Not ranked
- USCHO.com/CBS College Sports: Not ranked

Record
- Overall: 6-25-3

Coaches and captains
- Head coach: Dennis Miller

The 2003–04 Vermont Catamounts season was their second season in the ECAC Division I. Led by head coach Dennis Miller, the Catamounts had 6 victories, compared to 25 defeats and 3 ties. Their conference record was 2 victories, 15 defeats and 1 tie.

== Regular season ==
=== Schedule ===
Date	Opponent	Score	Result
Oct. 10	at Wisconsin	2-0	L
Oct. 11	at Wisconsin	7-0	L
Oct. 18	PROVIDENCE	5-1	L
Oct. 19	NORTHEASTERN	2-0	L
Oct. 25	at Clarkson	1-1	T
Oct. 26	at Clarkson	1-0	L
Oct. 30	at Boston College	3-1	W
Oct. 31	SACRED HEART	6-0	W
Nov. 8	DARTMOUTH*	8-2	L
Nov. 9	at DARTMOUTH*	9-0	L
Nov. 14	RENSSELAER	3-0	W
Nov. 21	YALE*	3-1	L
Nov. 20	PRINCETON*	5-1	L
Dec. 5	at New Hampshire	6-1	L
Jan. 2	QUINNIPIAC	4-1	L
Jan. 3	QUINNIPIAC	5-2	W
Jan. 5	NORTH DAKOTA	4-0	L
Jan. 6	NORTH DAKOTA	2-1	L
Jan. 10	at Harvard*	3-0	L
Jan. 11	at Brown*	6-1	L
Jan. 16	at Wayne State	0-0	T
Jan. 17	at Wayne State	4-1	L
Jan. 23	CORNELL*	3-1	L
Jan. 24	COLGATE*	4-3	L
Jan. 31	at St. Lawrence*	4-1	L
Feb. 1	at St. Lawrence*	4-2	L
Feb. 13	UNION*	4-0	W
Feb. 14	UNION*	3-0	W
Feb. 20	at PRINCETON*	3-1	L
Feb. 21	at YALE*	3-1	L
Feb. 27	Brown*	4-0	L
Feb. 28	Harvard*	6-0	L
Mar. 6	at COLGATE*	0-0	T
Mar. 7	at CORNELL*	2-1	L

== Team records ==
- Team Single Game Record, Most Goals Allowed (13) vs. Harvard (L, 13–0) 11/8/03
- Team Single Game Record, Most Opp. Shots On Goal, (68), at Wisconsin (L, 2–0)10/10/03
- Team Single Game Goaltending Record, Most Saves (66), at Wisconsin (10/10/03 - L, 2–0)
- Team Single Season Goaltending Record, Most Saves, 1372, 2003–04
- Individual Single Game Goaltending Record, Most Saves (66), Kami Cote at Wisconsin (10/10/03)
- Individual Single Season Record, Most Goals - D-I, 11, Hilary Johnson (2003–04)
- Individual Single Season Record, Most Penalty Minutes, 54, Becky Daley (2003–04)
- Individual Single Season Goaltending Record, Most Saves, 1,332, Kami Cote (2003–04)
- Individual Single Season Goaltending Record, Most Games Played, 34, Kami Cote (2003–04)
