= 2004–05 Vermont Catamounts women's ice hockey season =

- Conference: [[ECAC Hockey|ECAC Hockey]]
- Home ice: Gutterson Fieldhouse

Rankings
- USA Today/USA Hockey Magazine: Not ranked
- USCHO.com/CBS College Sports: Not ranked

Record
- Overall: 8-25-1

Coaches and captains
- Head coach: Dennis Miller

The 2004–05 Vermont Catamounts women's ice hockey season was the team's final season in the ECAC. Led by head coach Dennis Miller, the Catamounts had 5 victories, compared to 26 defeats and 3 ties. Their conference record was 3 victories, 17 defeats and 0 ties.

== Regular season ==
=== Schedule ===
Date	Opponent	Score	Result
Oct. 8	at Sacred Heart	2-1	W (OT)
Oct. 9	at Quinnipiac	3-2	L
Oct. 12	New Hampshire	5-0	L
Oct. 15	Maine	2-0	L
Oct. 16	Maine	2-2	T
Oct. 23	at Providence	2-1	L
Oct. 24	at Providence	5-0	L
Oct. 29	Sacred Heart	8-0	W
Oct. 30	Boston College	3-1	L
Nov. 5	at Yale*	2-1	L
Nov. 6	at Princeton*	4-1	L
Nov. 12	at Dartmouth*	4-0	L
Nov. 13	Dartmouth*	5-2	L
Nov. 19	at Cornell*	4-2	L
Nov. 20	at Colgate*	3-0	L
Dec. 7	at Boston College	3-0	L
Jan. 2	at Minn. Mankato	0-0	T
Jan. 3	at Minn. Mankato	1-0	L
Jan. 8	at North Dakota	2-2	T
Jan. 9	at North Dakota	2-1	L (OT)
Jan. 14	St. Lawrence*	6-1	L
Jan. 15	Clarkson*	4-0	L
Jan. 21	Colgate*	3-1	L
Jan. 22	Cornell*	1-0	W
Jan. 28	at Union*	4-1	W
Jan. 29	at Union*	3-0	W
Feb. 4	Harvard*	4-0	L
Feb. 5	Brown*	1-0	L
Feb. 11	at Clarkson*	3-0	L
Feb. 12	at St. Lawrence*	4-1	L
Feb. 18	Princeton*	2-0	L
Feb. 19	Yale*	3-0	L
Feb. 25	at Brown*	3-0	L
Feb. 26	at Harvard	7-1	L

== Team records ==
- Individual Single Season Goaltending Record, Most Minutes, 2010:55, Kami Cote (2004–05)
- Individual Single Season Goaltending Record, Most Games Played, 34, Kami Cote (2004–05)
