= 2005–06 Vermont Catamounts women's ice hockey season =

- Conference: Hockey East
- Home ice: Gutterson Fieldhouse

Rankings
- USA Today/USA Hockey Magazine: Not ranked
- USCHO.com/CBS College Sports: Not ranked

Record
- Overall: 3-29-2

Coaches and captains
- Head coach: Dennis Miller

The 2005–06 Vermont Catamounts season was their first in Hockey East. Led by head coach Dennis Miller, the Catamounts had 3 victories, compared to 29 defeats and 2 ties. Their conference record was 1 victory, 19 defeats and 1 tie. On October 29 and 30, the Catamounts competed in the Nichols Tournament, held in Buffalo, New York.

== Regular season ==
=== Schedule ===
Date	Opponent	Score	Result
Oct. 1	SACRED HEART	3-3	T
Oct. 7	CLARKSON	3-1	L
Oct. 8	CLARKSON	2-0	L
Oct. 15	at Wisconsin	5-0	L
Oct. 16	at Wisconsin	5-0	L
Oct. 22	BOSTON UNIV.*	3-3	T
Oct. 23	BOSTON UNIV.*	4-1	L
Oct. 29	vs. Niagara (Nichols Tournament)	3-1	L
Oct. 30	vs. Princeton (Nichols Tournament)	2-1	L (OT)
Nov. 5	ROBERT MORRIS	2-1	L
Nov. 6	ROBERT MORRIS	3-1	W
Nov. 12	at Northeastern*	1-0	W
Nov. 13	at Boston Univ.*	3-1	L
Nov. 17	at Providence*	6-1	L
Nov. 27	QUINNIPIAC	1-0	L
Dec. 1	at Connecticut*	4-0	L
Dec. 4	NEW HAMPSHIRE*	4-1	L
Jan. 1	CONNECTICUT*	2-1	L
Jan. 2	CONNECTICUT*	3-0	L
Jan. 6	NORTH DAKOTA	3-2	L
Jan. 7	NORTH DAKOTA	3-2	L (OT)
Jan. 12	at Boston College*	3-1	L
Jan. 13	at Boston College*	3-0	L
Jan. 16	BOSTON COLLEGE*	2-0	L
Jan. 21	MAINE*	2-0	L
Jan. 29	RENSSELAER	4-3	W
Feb. 4	PROVIDENCE*	4-1	L
Feb. 5	PROVIDENCE*	5-1	L
Feb. 11	at Maine*	7-0	L
Feb. 12	at Maine*	3-0	L
Feb. 18	NORTHEASTERN*	2-1	L
Feb. 19	NORTHEASTERN*	3-0	L
Feb. 25	at New Hampshire*	5-0	L
Feb. 26	at New Hampshire*	8-0	L

== Awards and honors ==
- Gabe Worzella, National Strength and Conditioning All-American
- Abbey Kaknes, Humanitarian Award Nominee
- Abbey Kaknes, Hockey East All-Star Team vs. Team USA

=== Team records ===
- Team Single Season Record, Most Games Lost, (29), 2005–06
- Team Single Season Record, Most Penalties, (172), 2005–06
