= 2007–08 Vermont Catamounts women's ice hockey season =

- Conference: Hockey East
- Home ice: Gutterson Fieldhouse

Rankings
- USA Today/USA Hockey Magazine: Not ranked
- USCHO.com/CBS College Sports: Not ranked

Record
- Overall: 6-25-1

Coaches and captains
- Head coach: Tim Bothwell

The 2007–08 Vermont Catamounts season was their third in Hockey East. Led by head coach Tim Bothwell, the Catamounts had 8 victories, compared to 25 defeats and 1 tie. Their conference record was 4 victories, 16 defeats and 1 tie.

== Regular season ==
- October 6, 2007: Kate Lesniak scored a hat trick vs. the Sacred Heart Pioneers women's ice hockey program.

=== Schedule ===
Date	Opponent	Score	Result
Oct. 6	SACRED HEART	5-1	W
Oct. 7	SACRED HEART	8-2	W
Oct. 12	UNION	4-0	W
Oct. 13	UNION	4-1	W
Oct. 21	at Cornell	3-0	L
Oct. 22	at Cornell	4-2	L
Oct. 26	at Dartmouth	4-3	L (OT)
Nov. 2	BOSTON COLLEGE*	3-1	L
Nov. 3	NEW HAMPSHIRE*	5-0	L
Nov. 10	at Providence*	2-1	L
Nov. 11	at Connecticut*	3-0	L
Nov. 24	MAINE*	0-0	T
Dec. 1	at Northeastern*	2-1	L
Dec. 2	at Boston Univ. *	3-0	L
Dec. 29	at Bemidji State	4-1	L
Dec. 30	at Bemidji State	3-2	L
Jan. 5	CLARKSON	5-1	L
Jan. 6	CLARKSON	3-1	L
Jan. 11	CONNECTICUT*	5-1	L
Jan. 12	CONNECTICUT*	6-0	L
Jan. 18	at St. Cloud St.	4-1	L
Jan. 19	at St. Cloud St.	5-1	L
Jan. 25	PROVIDENCE*	3-2	L
Jan. 26	PROVIDENCE*	2-1	W
Feb. 1	at Boston College*	4-0	L
Feb. 2	at Boston College*	4-0	L
Feb. 8	BOSTON UNIV. *	3-1	L
Feb. 9	BOSTON UNIV. *	2-0	L
Feb. 16	at New Hampshire*	7-0	L
Feb. 17	at New Hampshire*	3-0	L
Feb. 22	NORTHEASTERN*	4-1	W
Feb. 23	NORTHEASTERN*	3-0	L
Mar. 1	at Maine*	5-1	W
Mar. 2	at Maine*	6-1	W

== Awards and honors ==
=== Hockey East All-Academic Team ===
Year	Player
2008	Kristi Anderson
2008	Caroline Donahue
2008	Celeste Doucet
2008	Sarah Ellins
2008	Chelsea Furlani
2008	Kate Lesniak
2008	Jessica Murphy
2008	Brittany Nelson
2008	Kristen Olychuck
2008	Karen Sentoff
2008	Jackie Thode
2008	Peggy Wakeham
2008	Frankie Williams

=== Team records ===
- Team Single Season Record, Most Shorthanded Goals, (5), 2007–08
- Individual Single Season Record, Most Shorthanded Goals, .2, Brittany Nelson (2007–08)
