= Sini Karjalainen =

Finnish ice hockey player (born 1999)

- Born: 30 January 1999 (age 27) Posio, Finland
- Height: 173 cm (5 ft 8 in)
- Weight: 63 kg (139 lb; 9 st 13 lb)
- Position: Defense
- Shoots: Left
- SDHL team Former teams: Skellefteå AIK: Brynäs IF; Vermont Catamounts; Team Kuortane; Rovaniemen Kiekko
- National team: Finland
- Playing career: 2013–present
Medal record
Olympic Games
Bronze medal – third place	2022 Beijing	Ice hockey
World Championships
Bronze medal – third place	2021 Canada

Sini Karjalainen (born 30 January 1999) is a Finnish ice hockey player for Skellefteå AIK of the Swedish Women's Hockey League (SDHL) and a member of the Finnish national team. She played college ice hockey at Vermont.

== International play ==
Karjalainen played with the Finnish women's national U18 team at the IIHF World Women's U18 Championships in 2015, 2016, and 2017.

She was officially named to the Finnish roster for the 2020 IIHF Women's World Championship on 4 March 2020, before the tournament was cancelled on 7 March 2020 due to public health concerns related to the COVID-19 pandemic. The 2020 World Championship would have been Karjalainen's debut with the Finnish national team at an IIHF-organized international tournament; she appeared on the national roster for various Euro Hockey Tour tournaments, first in 2016.

She ultimately debuted with the senior national at the 2021 IIHF Women's World Championship as an alternate defenseman on the 25-player roster and skated in five games.

On 2 January 2026, she was named to Finland's roster to compete at the 2026 Winter Olympics.

== Career statistics ==
=== Regular season and playoffs ===
			Regular season					Playoffs
Season	Team	League	GP	G	A	Pts	PIM	GP	G	A	Pts	PIM
2013–14	RoKi	N. Mestis	21	5	6	11	4	9	1	1	2	2
2014–15	RoKi	N. Mestis	2	1	1	2	0	—	—	—	—	—
2015–16	Team Kuortane	NSMs	28	2	7	9	2	2	0	0	0	0
2016–17	Team Kuortane	NSMs	28	1	10	11	0	2	0	0	0	0
2017–18	Team Kuortane	NSML	30	6	10	16	2	8	0	5	5	6
2018–19	Vermont Catamounts	NCAA	36	1	11	12	12	—	—	—	—	—
2019–20	Vermont Catamounts	NCAA	35	5	19	24	20	—	—	—	—	—
2020–21	Vermont Catamounts	NCAA	11	0	1	1	6	—	—	—	—	—
2021–22	Vermont Catamounts	NCAA	21	2	10	12	6	—	—	—	—	—
2022–23	Vermont Catamounts	NCAA	36	3	24	27	4	—	—	—	—	—
Naisten Liiga totals			86	9	27	36	4	12	0	5	5	6
NCAA totals			138	11	65	76	48	–	–	–	–	–

Sources: Elite Prospects, Hockey East

=== International ===
Year	Team	Event	Result	GP	G	A	Pts	PIM
2015	Finland U18	WW18	5th	5	0	0	0	4
2016	Finland U18	WW18	6th	5	1	0	1	4
2017	Finland U18	WW18	5th	4	0	0	0	2
2021	Finland	WW	3rd place, bronze medalist(s)	5	0	0	0	4
2022	Finland	OG	3rd place, bronze medalist(s)	7	0	0	0	2
2022	Finland	WW	6th	4	1	0	1	0
2023	Finland	WW	5th	7	0	2	2	0
2026	Finland	OG	6th	5	0	0	0	0
Junior totals				14	1	0	1	10
Senior totals				28	1	2	3	6

== Awards and honors ==
Award	Year
International
World U18 Top-3 Player on Team	2016, 2017
Olympic Bronze Medal	2022
World Championship Bronze Medal	2021
Vermont Catamounts
Hockey East Rookie of the Week	10 December 2018
Hockey East Rookie of the Month	December 2018
NCAA D1 First Star of the Week	28 October 2019
Hockey East Player of the Week	28 October 2019
Hockey East Defender of the Week	21 February 2023
Hockey East Defender of the Year	2022–23 (Note: Co-awarded with Megan Carter of the Northeastern Huskies)
Hockey East First-Team All-Star	2022–23
Naisten Liiga
Finnish Championship Bronze Medal	2018
