= Samantha Kolowratová =

Czech ice hockey player

- Born: 12 July 1996 (age 30) Prague, Czech Republic
- Height: 1.70 m (5 ft 7 in)
- Weight: 71 kg (157 lb; 11 st 3 lb)
- Position: Defence
- Shoots: Right
- Played for: Brynäs IF; Metropolitan Riveters; Vermont Catamounts; HC Slavia Praha
- National team: Czech Republic
- Playing career: 2011–present

Samantha Ahn Kolowratová, also known as Sammy Kolowrat (born 12 July 1996) is a Czech ice hockey player. As a member of the Czech national team, she participated in the women's ice hockey tournament at the 2022 Winter Olympics and six IIHF Women's World Championships.

Kolowratová most recently played with Brynäs IF of the Swedish Women's Hockey League (SDHL) during the 2021–22 season.

== Playing career ==
Across 141 NCAA games with the Vermont Catamounts women's ice hockey program, she scored 28 points and served as the team's captain in her final season. She was named to the Hockey East All-Academic Team in 2016 and 2017.

After spending a year away from hockey completing her master's degree, she signed with the Metropolitan Riveters ahead of the 2020–21 NWHL season.

=== International ===
Kolowratová has represented the Czech Republic at the IIHF Women's World Championships in 2013, 2016, 2017, 2019, 2021, and at the Division I Group A tournament in 2015. She also participated in three qualifiers for the Winter Olympic Games, including the qualification tournament for the women's ice hockey tournament at the 2022 Winter Olympics, at which the Czech Republic qualified for the first time in team history.

As a junior player with the Czech national under-18 team, she participated in the IIHF Women's U18 World Championships in 2012, 2013, and 2014.

== Personal life ==
Kolowratová has a bachelor's degree in biological science and a master's degree in pharmacology from the University of Vermont.

She is a descendant of the Kolowrat-Krakowsky Bohemian aristocratic family.
