= Dennis Miller (ice hockey) =

American ice hockey player, coach, and scout

Dennis Miller (born July 25, 1969, in Buffalo, New York, United States), is a former American ice hockey player, coach, and scout.

== Playing career ==
Miller was a four-year letterman at Vermont under head coach Mike Gilligan, appearing in 128 games and logging 37 points in his career. After graduation, Miller played two games for the ECHL's Louisville Icehawks, and five games for Motor České Budějovice in the Czech Republic. He also played two seasons for the Flint Bulldogs of the Colonial Hockey League and wrapped up his playing with the Fort Worth Fire of the Central Hockey League.

== Coaching career ==
Miller was hired by his alma mater in 1996 to lead Vermont's women's hockey team to full varsity status, starting competition at the NCAA Division III level as it transitioned to NCAA Division I. He also served as a collegiate scout for the Johnstown Chiefs of the ECHL during this time, as well. In its five seasons under Miller at the Division I level in ECAC Hockey and Hockey East, the Catamounts went 18–133–11 overall, and 70–177–23 in his 10 years overall at the helm. In March 2006, Miller resigned from his position at Vermont.

Miller was hired as an assistant coach for the women's team at North Dakota, and filled in as interim head coach when Shantel Rivard was released from her contract. Since 2011, Miller has served in various roles in the Buffalo Sabres organization, including Director of Player Development, pro scout, and rehab and development.

Preceded by Bruce Gerrapy	University of Vermont women's ice hockey Head coach 1996–2006	Succeeded by Tim Bothwell
