= Maude Poulin-Labelle =

Canadian ice hockey player (born 1999)

- Born: November 23, 1999 (age 26) Sherbrooke, Quebec, Canada
- Height: 5 ft 6 in (168 cm)
- Weight: 130 lb (59 kg; 9 st 4 lb)
- Position: Defence
- Shoots: Left
- SDHL team Former teams: Brynäs IF; Toronto Sceptres
- Playing career: 2024–present

Maude Poulin-Labelle (born November 23, 1999) is a Canadian professional ice hockey defenceman for Brynäs IF of the Swedish Women's Hockey League (SDHL). She previously played in the Professional Women's Hockey League (PWHL) for the Toronto Sceptres.

== Early life ==
Poulin-Labelle was born November 23, 1999, in Sherbrooke, Quebec, to Patrick Labelle and Micheline Poulin. She began playing ice hockey at the age of three, following her older siblings Jeffrey and Marie-Pier into the sport. She played both forward and defence at Stanstead College in Quebec.

== Playing career ==
=== College ===
Poulin-Labelle joined the Vermont Catamounts for the 2018–19 Hockey East season. She recorded her first collegiate point with an assist on Ève-Audrey Picard's goal against the Quinnipiac Bobcats on October 12, 2018. Her first goal followed on November 17, as part of Vermont's 3–3 draw against the Boston University Terriers. Poulin-Labelle was named Hockey East's Rookie of the Week on February 4 after scoring the game-winning goal over the Holy Cross Crusaders. She finished her freshman season with five goals and 11 points in 36 games, and was named to the Hockey East All-Academic Team.

Early into her sophomore season, Poulin-Labelle recorded the first hat-trick by a Vermont defenceman in program history, scoring three goals against the Dartmouth Big Green on October 29, 2019. She was named the Hockey East Player of the Week on January 6 after recording five points in two games. Poulin-Labelle finished the 2019–20 season with 29 points in 36 games, tied for the most on the Catamounts and the most by any defenceman in program history. For her performance, she was named to the Hockey East Third All-Star Team. The next season, Poulin-Labelle was named to the Hockey East Second All-Star Team, making her only the third Catamount to receive All-Star honours twice.

As a senior during the 2021–22 season, Poulin-Labelle set a Catamounts record for most points by a defenceman. Her two assists in a 5–2 loss to the New Hampshire Wildcats on December 3 gave her 63 career points, passing Taylor Willard's 62. She was named the Hockey East Player of the Month for December, finishing the month with 66 career points. On January 18, 2022, Poulin-Labelle set a Catamounts record with six points in Vermont's 9–0 rout of Holy Cross, including a natural hat-trick. Poulin-Labelle finished the season with 13 goals and 35 points in 34 games, third among all college defencemen. In addition to receiving CCM/AHCA All-American Second Team honours, Poulin-Labelle was named Hockey East Co-Best Defenseman, sharing the award with Skylar Fontaine of the Northeastern Huskies. In four years with the Catamounts, Poulin-Labelle recorded 30 goals and 80 points.

With one remaining season of college ice hockey eligibility, Poulin-Labelle transferred to Northeastern for the 2022–23 season. She finished the year second among Hockey East defenders with 20 points, including four goals, and was named to the Hockey East Third All-Star Team once again. Poulin-Labelle finished her college hockey career with 35 goals and 106 points in 155 games.

=== Professional ===
The Montreal Victoire of the Professional Women's Hockey League (PWHL) selected Poulin-Labelle in the tenth round, 55th overall, of the 2023 PWHL draft. Before playing a game with Montreal, she was placed on the team's reserve list, where she was claimed by the Toronto Sceptres. As a member of the Sceptres' active roster, Poulin-Labelle played 11 games during the 2023–24 season.

After attending training camp with the Boston Fleet, on December 2, 2024, Poulin-Labelle signed a one-year contract with Brynäs IF of the Swedish Women's Hockey League (SDHL). She made her debut on December 7, with a goal and two assist in Brynäs' 5–1 win over Leksands IF. When Maja Nylén Persson left the SDHL five games into the season to join the New York Sirens, Poulin-Labelle took a larger role with Brynäs, recording four goals and 16 points in 17 regular-season games. She added another two assists in nine playoff games as Brynäs lost to Frölunda HC in the semifinal round of SDHL playoffs.

Poulin-Labelle signed a one-year contract extension with Brynäs on June 18, 2025.

== Career statistics ==
			Regular season					Playoffs
Season	Team	League	GP	G	A	Pts	PIM	GP	G	A	Pts	PIM
2018–19	Vermont Catamounts	HE	36	5	6	11	16	—	—	—	—	—
2019–20	Vermont Catamounts	HE	36	12	17	29	16	—	—	—	—	—
2020–21	Vermont Catamounts	HE	11	1	8	9	2	—	—	—	—	—
2021–22	Vermont Catamounts	HE	34	13	22	35	14	—	—	—	—	—
2022–23	Northeastern Huskies	HE	38	4	18	22	8	—	—	—	—	—
2023–24	Toronto Sceptres	PWHL	11	0	0	0	0	—	—	—	—	—
2024–25	Brynäs IF	SDHL	17	4	12	16	12	9	0	2	2	4
PWHL totals			11	0	0	0	0	—	—	—	—	—
SDHL totals			17	4	12	16	12	9	0	2	2	4

== Awards and honours ==
Award	Year(s)	Ref.
College
All-Hockey East Third Team	2020, 2023	
All-Hockey East Second Team	2021	
CCM/AHCA Second-Team All-American	2022	
Hockey East Best Defenceman	2022	
