= 2008–09 Vermont Catamounts women's ice hockey season =

- Conference: Hockey East
- Home ice: Gutterson Fieldhouse

Rankings
- USA Today/USA Hockey Magazine: Not ranked
- USCHO.com/CBS College Sports: Not ranked

Record
- Overall: 7-25-2

Coaches and captains
- Head coach: Tim Bothwell

The 2008–09 Vermont Catamounts season was their fourth in Hockey East. Led by head coach Tim Bothwell, the Catamounts had 7 victories, compared to 25 defeats and 2 ties. Their conference record was 4 victories, 15 defeats and 2 ties.

== Regular season ==
=== Standings ===
2008–09 Hockey East Association standings
	Conference									Overall			
	W	L	T	SOW	PTS	GF	GA	W		L	T	GF	GA
New Hampshire	21	16	2	3	35	73	38		24	6	5	117	76
Boston College	21	14	5	2	30	68	35		22	9	5	107	63
Boston University	21	14	6	1	29	62	41		18	11	7	95	77
Providence	21	12	8	1	25	52	40		17	16	3	86	77
Connecticut	21	12	8	1	25	48	42		19	12	4	100	75
Northeastern	21	7	13	1	15	33	56		12	20	3	63	82
Vermont	21	5	15	1	11	32	70		7	25	2	57	134
Maine	21	4	15	2	10	33	79		5	23	5	67	119

=== Schedule ===
Date	Opponent	Score	Result
Oct. 10	Union	7-2	W
Oct. 11	Union	3-1	L
Oct. 18	CONNECTICUT	1-2	L
Oct. 19	PROVIDENCE	2-4	L
Oct. 24	CORNELL	1-7	L
Oct. 25	CORNELL	1-5	L
Oct. 31	Boston College	1-4	L
Nov. 01	New Hampshire	1-4	L
Nov. 07	WAYNE STATE	3-5	L
Nov. 08	WAYNE STATE	0-7	L
Nov. 14	Quinnipiac	3-1	W
Nov. 15	Princeton	1-3	L
Nov. 25	Maine	2-2	Tie
Nov. 29	Clarkson	2-4	L
Nov. 30	Clarkson	1-9	L
Dec. 05	BOSTON UNIV.	3-2	W
Dec. 06	NORTHEASTERN	1-2	L
Dec. 30	DARTMOUTH	1-4	L
Jan. 03	Connecticut	0-7	L
Jan. 04	Connecticut	1-3	L
Jan. 10	Mercyhurst	1-8	L
Jan. 11	Mercyhurst	1-8	L
Jan. 17	Providence	0-3	L
Jan. 18	Providence	5-2	W
Jan. 24	BOSTON	0-5	L
Jan. 25	BOSTON	0-5	L
Jan. 30	Boston Univ.	2-3	L
Jan. 31	Boston Univ.	0-4	L
Feb. 07	NEW HAMPSHIRE	1-3	L
Feb. 08	NEW HAMPSHIRE	2-6	L
Feb. 14	Northeastern	4-3	W
Feb. 15	Northeastern	3-4	L
Feb. 21	MAINE	1-0	L
Feb. 22	MAINE	2-2	Tie

== Awards and honors ==
- Erin Barley-Maloney, Hockey East All-Rookie Team

=== Team records ===
- Team Single Season Record, Most Power Play Goals, (26), 2008–09
- Individual Single Game Record, Most Points, 4, Peggy Wakeham (1-3-4), at Union (10/10/08)
- Individual Single Game Record, Most Points, Def. 4, Peggy Wakeham(1-3-4), at Union (10/10/08)
- Individual Single Game Record, Most Assists, 3, Peggy Wakeham, at Northeastern (2/14/09)
- Individual Single Game Record, Most Assists, 3, Erin Barley-Maloney, at Providence (1/18/08)
- Individual Single Game Record, Most Assists, 3, Peggy Wakeham, at Union (10/10/08)
- Individual Single Season Record, Most Points - D-I, 22, Peggy Wakeham (2008–09)
- Individual Single Season Record, Most Assists - D-I, 16, Peggy Wakeham (2008–09)
- Individual Single Season Record, Most Points – Defenseman, 22, Peggy Wakeham (2008–09)
- Individual Single Season Record, Most Goals – Defenseman, 6, Peggy Wakeham (2008–09)
- Individual Single Season Record, Most Assists – Defensemen, 16, Peggy Wakeham (2008–09)
- Individual Single Season Record, Most Assists – Freshman, 15, Erin Barley-Maloney (2008–09)
