= Blanka Škodová =

Czech ice hockey goaltender

- Born: 1 October 1997 (age 29) Šternberk, Czech Republic
- Height: 176 cm (5 ft 9 in)
- Weight: 68 kg (150 lb; 10 st 10 lb)
- Position: Goaltender
- Catches: Left
- SDHL team Former teams: Leksands IF: Skellefteå AIK; AIK IF; IFK Helsinki; Minnesota Duluth Bulldogs; Vermont Catamounts; SK Karviná; HC Uničov
- National team: Czech Republic
- Playing career: 2011–present
Medal record
World Championship
Bronze medal – third place	2022 Denmark
Bronze medal – third place	2023 Canada

Blanka Škodová (born 1 October 1997) is a Czech ice hockey goaltender and member of the Czech national team. She has played with Leksands IF in the Swedish Women's Hockey League (SDHL) with since June 2025.

== International play ==
As a junior player with the Czech national under-18 team, she participated in the 2015 IIHF Women's U18 World Championships, at which she was selected as a top three player on the Czech team by the coaches.

Škodová represented the Czech Republic at the IIHF World Women's Championships in 2016 and 2017, at the Division I Group A tournament in 2015. She again represented the Czech Republic at the IIHF World Women's Championship in 2022 and 2023, winning consecutive bronze medals.
