= Kristýna Pátková =

Czech ice hockey player

- Born: 17 June 1998 (age 28) Meziboří, Czechia
- Height: 1.67 m (5 ft 6 in)
- Weight: 69 kg (152 lb; 10 st 12 lb)
- Position: Forward
- Shoots: Right
- SDHL team Former teams: Linköping HC; Vermont Catamounts; HC Litvínov
- National team: Czech Republic
- Playing career: 2011–present
Medal record
World Championship
Bronze medal – third place	2022 Denmark	Ice hockey
Bronze medal – third place	2023 Canada	Ice hockey
World University Games
Bronze medal – third place	2023 Lake Placid	Ice hockey

Kristýna "Tynka" Pátková (born 17 June 1998) is a Czech ice hockey player and a member of the Czech national team. She plays in the Swedish Women's Hockey League (SDHL) with Linköping HC.

== Playing career ==
During her early teens, Pátková played with the women's representative team of HC Litvínov in the Czech Women's Extraliga (Extraliga žen) until 2016. At that time, she secured a scholarship to and began attending The Gunnery, a private boarding school in Washington, Connecticut, United States known for its strong athletics programs. While a member of The Gunnary girls’ ice hockey team, which competes in the USA Hockey High School Girls League, she also played with the Connecticut Polar Bears U19 of the USA Hockey Girls Tier I Under-19 (19U AAA) League. Fellow Czech ex-pat and future national team teammate Noemi Neubauerová was also Pátková's teammate at The Gunnery, and with the Connecticut Polar Bears U19.

In 2018, Pátková relocated to the Hockey Training Institute (HTI) in Mulmur, Ontario, Canada, to play with the HTI Stars, an independent women's under-20 ice hockey team. She joined Natálie Mlýnková and Kateřina Zechovská as one of three Czech players on an international roster that included players from nine different countries. At the end of the season, Pátková and Mlýnková both committed to the University of Vermont as incoming freshmen for the 2019–20 season.

== International play ==
Pátková made her international junior debut representing the Czech Republic at the 2014 IIHF Women's U18 World Championship, at which the Czech Republic claimed bronze. She went on to play at the IIHF Women's U18 World Championships in 2015 and 2016.

Her first tournament with the senior national team was the 2021 IIHF Women's World Championship in Calgary, and her first international goal was scored in the Czech Republic's opening match against Denmark. She again represented the Czech Republic at the IIHF World Women's Championship in 2022 and 2023, winning consecutive bronze medals.
