= Jessie McPherson =

Canadian ice hockey player (born 2002)

- Born: December 20, 2002 (age 23) Chatham, Ontario, Canada
- Height: 5 ft 9 in (175 cm)
- Position: Goaltender
- Catches: Left
- PWHL team: Toronto Sceptres

Jessie McPherson (born December 20, 2002) is a Canadian professional ice hockey goaltender for the Toronto Sceptres of the Professional Women's Hockey League (PWHL). She played college ice hockey at Vermont and Minnesota State.

== Early life ==
McPherson was born to Nathan and Sandra McPherson, and has a brother, Kyle. She played three seasons with the Cambridge Rivulettes of the Provincial Women's Hockey League.

== Playing career ==
=== College ===
McPherson began her collegiate career for Vermont during the 2020–21 season. During her freshman year, she started seven games, and posted a 4–3–0 record, with a 1.57 goals against average (GAA), a .938 save percentage, and three shutouts, in a season that was shortened due to the COVID-19 pandemic. On January 1, 2021, she made her collegiate debut in a game against Holy Cross, and posted a shutout. She became the first freshman goaltender to earn a shutout in her debut for Vermont since 2014. Her three shutouts were second-best in the nation among all rookie goaltenders, while her save percentage ranked second and her GAA ranked fourth. Following the season she was named the Pro Ambitions Rookie of the Year, and named to the WHEA All-Rookie Team.

During the 2021–22 season, in her sophomore year, she appeared in 22 games and posted a 15–5–1 record, with a 1.97 GAA and .919 save percentage. Her 15 wins was a Vermont single-season program record. During the 2022–23 season, in her junior year, she appeared in 35 games and posted a 21–11–3 record, with a 1.80 GAA and .915 save percentage. She set single-season records in wins (21), games (35), shutouts (4), saves (675) and minutes played (2,098:16). During the 2023–24 season, in her senior year, she appeared in 26 games and posted an 11–10–5 record, with a 2.29 GAA and .909 save percentage. She finished her career at Vermont with a 50–27–9 record, ten shutouts, a .917 save percentage and 1.97 GAA. She is the program's all-time leader in wins.

On March 22, 2024, she joined Minnesota State as a graduate transfer. During the 2024–25 season, as a graduate student, she appeared in 15 games with nine starts and posted a 3–5–1 record, with a 3.06 GAA and .895 save percentage.

=== Professional ===
After going undrafted in the 2025 PWHL Draft, McPherson signed with the Ridgetown Royals men's ice hockey team of the American Premier Hockey League for their inaugural season in September 2025. In October 2025, she was invited to the Toronto Sceptres' pre-season training camp. On November 20, 2025, she signed a two-year contract with the Sceptres.

== Career statistics ==
Season	Team	League	GP	W	L	T	MIN	GA	SO	GAA	SV%
2020–21	University of Vermont	HE	7	4	3	0	420	11	3	1.57	.938
2021–22	University of Vermont	HE	22	15	5	1	1,307	43	1	1.97	.919
2022–23	University of Vermont	HE	35	21	11	3	2,098	63	4	1.80	.915
2023–24	University of Vermont	HE	26	11	10	5	1,546	59	3	2.29	.909
2024–25	Minnesota State University	WCHA	12	3	5	1	490	25	0	3.06	.895
NCAA totals			105	54	34	10	5,861	201	11	2.06	.914
