= Theresa Schafzahl =

Austrian ice hockey player (born 2000)

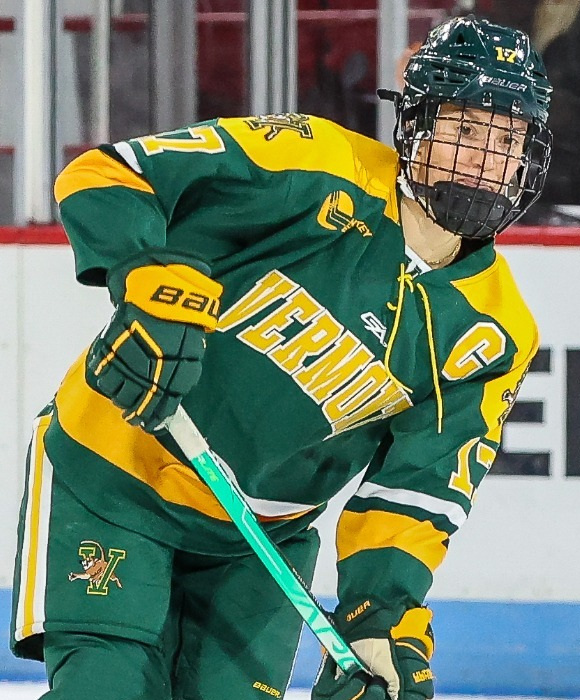
- Schafzahl with the Vermont Catamounts in 2022
- Born: 12 April 2000 (age 26) Weiz, Austria
- Height: 5 ft 8 in (173 cm)
- Position: Forward
- Shoots: Left
- PWHL team Former teams: Seattle Torrent; Boston Fleet
- National team: Austria
- Playing career: 2018–present

Theresa Schafzahl (born 12 April 2000) is an Austrian professional ice hockey player for the Seattle Torrent of the Professional Women's Hockey League (PWHL) and member of Austria women's national ice hockey team. She previously played for the Boston Fleet of the PWHL. She played college ice hockey at Vermont, where she is the program's all-time leader in goals, assists and points.

== Playing career ==
=== College ===
Schafzahl began her collegiate career with the Vermont Catamounts during the 2018–19 season. During her freshman year, she recorded seven goals and 10 assists in 36 games. She led all Catamounts rookies in points, and ranked tied for second-most on the team with 17. During the 2019–20 season in her sophomore year, she recorded 14 goals and 15 assists in 36 games. She led the team in goals and tied for the team lead with 29 points. During the 2020–21 season in her junior year, she recorded four goals and four assists in a season that was shortened due to the COVID-19 pandemic. She tied for the team lead with four goals.

During the 2021–22 season in her senior year, she recorded 25 goals and 21 assists in 29 games. She set the Vermont single season record for points (46) and goals (25). On 9 October 2022, she recorded two goals and became the program's all-time career leader in points with 106. She was named the Hockey East Player of the Month and the HCA National Player of the Month for the month of January. She led the NCAA with nine goals and 17 points in nine games during the month. She recorded at least one point in all nine games and had six multiple point games. Following an outstanding season she was named a unanimous First Team All Hockey East selection, Hockey East Scoring Champion, Hockey East Player of the Year, and PNC Bank Three Stars Award winner. She was also named a CCM/AHCA Hockey First Team All-American and a top-ten finalist for the Patty Kazmaier Award, becoming the first player in program history to be named a finalist for the award.

During the 2022–23 season, as a graduate student, she recorded 21 goals and 24 assists in 36 games. She led the team in scoring with 45 points and tied the Vermont single season record for assists (24). Following the season she was named a First Team All Hockey East selection. She finished her career at Vermont as the program's all-time leader in goals (71), assists (74), and points (145).

=== Professional ===
On 12 May 2023, Schafzahl signed a two-year contract with the Montreal Force of the Premier Hockey Federation (PHF). The PHF ceased operations on 29 June 2023, as a result she never played a game for the Force.

On 18 September 2023, Schafzahl was drafted 39th overall by PWHL Boston in the 2023 PWHL Draft. On 1 November 2023, she signed a two-year contract with Boston. During the 2023–24 season, she recorded three goals and three assists in 20 regular season games and three assists in eight playoff games. She scored the team's first-ever goal on January 3, 2024. During the 2024–25 season, she recorded three goals and two assists in 30 games with the Fleet. On 18 June 2025, she signed a one-year contract with the Fleet. During the 2024–25 season, she recorded three goals and two assists in 30 games.

On March 16, 2026, Schafzahl was traded to the Seattle Torrent in exchange for Jessie Eldridge. Prior to being traded she recorded two goals and four assists in 19 games for the Fleet during the 2025–26 season.

== International play ==
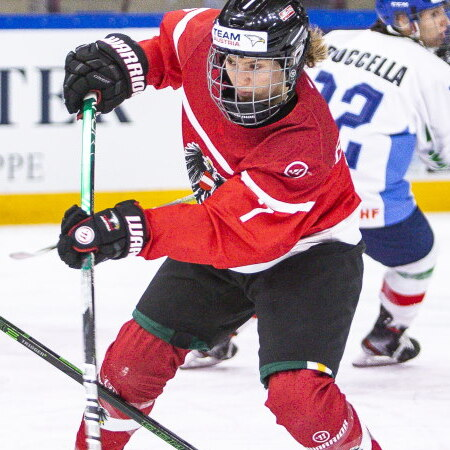
Schafzahl representing Austria at the 2022 Olympic Qualification

Schafzahl represented Austria at the 2016 Winter Youth Olympics in the girls' individual skills challenge and won a bronze medal. She represented Austria at the 2015 IIHF World Women's U18 Championship where she recorded one assist in four games. She again represented Austria at the IIHF World Women's U18 Championship in 2016, 2017 and 2018, where she led the team in scoring each year.

Schafzahl made her senior national team debut for Austria at the 2016 IIHF Women's World Championship Division I, where she recorded one goal in five games and won a bronze medal. She again represented Austria at the IIHF World Women's Championship in 2017, 2018, 2019, and 2022.

== Career statistics ==
=== Regular season and playoffs ===
			Regular season					Playoffs
Season	Team	League	GP	G	A	Pts	PIM	GP	G	A	Pts	PIM
2018–19	University of Vermont	HE	36	7	10	17	12	—	—	—	—	—
2019–20	University of Vermont	HE	36	14	15	29	18	—	—	—	—	—
2020–21	University of Vermont	HE	11	4	4	8	8	—	—	—	—	—
2021–22	University of Vermont	HE	29	25	21	46	8	—	—	—	—	—
2022–23	Vermont	HE	36	21	24	45	8	—	—	—	—	—
2023–24	PWHL Boston	PWHL	20	3	3	6	0	8	0	3	3	0
2024–25	Boston Fleet	PWHL	30	3	2	5	6	—	—	—	—	—
2025–26	Boston Fleet	PWHL	19	2	4	6	0	—	—	—	—	—
2025–26	Seattle Torrent	PWHL	11	2	7	9	0	—	—	—	—	—
PWHL totals			80	10	16	26	6	8	0	3	3	0

=== International ===
Year	Team	Event	GP	G	A	Pts	PIM
2015	Austria	U18-D1A	4	0	1	1	2
2016	Austria	U18-D1A	4	3	5	8	4
2016	Austria	WC-D1A	5	1	0	1	0
2017	Austria	U18-D1A	5	1	4	5	8
2017	Austria	WC-D1A	5	2	5	7	2
2017	Austria	OGQ	3	0	0	0	2
2018	Austria	WC-D1A	5	2	1	3	0
2018	Austria	U18-D1A	5	5	1	6	4
2019	Austria	WC D1A	5	5	0	5	2
2021	Austria	OGQ	3	1	1	2	2
2022	Austria	WC-D1A	4	2	1	3	0
Junior totals			18	9	11	20	18
Senior totals			30	13	8	21	8

== Awards and honours ==
Honors	Year
College
First Team All-Hockey East	2022
Hockey East Scoring Champion	2022
Hockey East Player of the Year	2022
CCM/AHCA Hockey First Team All-American	2022
First Team All-Hockey East	2023
