= Sofie Skott Dahl =

Danish ice hockey player

- Born: 14 June 2002 (age 22); Herning, Denmark
- Height: 172 cm (5 ft 8 in)
- Weight: 62 kg (137 lb; 9 st 11 lb)
- Position: Defense
- Shoots: Left
- NCAA team Former teams: Vermont Catamounts; Malmö Redhawks; Hvidovre IK; Silkeborg SF; Herning IK
- National team: Denmark
- Playing career: 2013–present

Sofie Skott Dahl (born 14 June 2002) is a Danish ice hockey player and member of the Danish national ice hockey team, currently playing with the Vermont Catamounts women's ice hockey program in the Hockey East (HEA) conference of the NCAA Division I.

Skott Dahl made her senior national team debut at the IIHF Women's World Championship in 2021. As a junior player with the Danish national under-18 team, she participated four IIHF Women's U18 World Championships: the Division I Group B tournaments in 2017 and 2018, and the Division I Group A tournaments in 2019 and 2020. At the 2019 IIHF U18 World Championship Division 1A, she recorded the most goals (3) by a defenceman and was also the tournament's most penalized player (12 PIM).
