= Jim Plumer =

American ice hockey coach

Current position
- Title: Head coach
- Team: Vermont
- Conference: Hockey East
- Record: 144-177-47 (.455)

Biographical details
- Born: Norwood, Massachusetts
- Education: Colby College

Coaching career (HC unless noted)
- 1983–1984: Colby (men's student asst.)
- 1984–1985: North Yarmouth Acad. (women's)
- 2001–2003: Bowdoin (women's asst.)
- 2003–2012: Amherst (women's)
- 2012–present: Vermont (women's)

Head coaching record
- Overall: 302–246–66 (.546)

Accomplishments and honors

Awards
- Hockey East Co-Coach of the Year (2014); Hockey East Coach of the Year (2022); New England Div. I Women's Coach of the Year (2014, 2017); ACHA National Coach of the Year (2009); NESCAC Coach of the Year (2007, 2009); NCAA Div. III National Champions (2009, 2010)

Jim Plumer is an American ice hockey coach. He is the current head coach of the Vermont Catamounts women's ice hockey team. He previously served as the women's hockey head coach at Amherst, where he guided them to back-to-back NCAA Division III national championships.

== Coaching career ==
As a student at Colby College, Plumer helped the men's hockey team during the 1983-84 season. Upon graduation, he moved on to become the women's hockey head coach at North Yarmouth Academy in Maine. A Master Level coach with USA Hockey, Plumer has coached at various showcase and camps across the region, and in 2000 was named a women's hockey assistantcoach at Bowdoin College where he was on the staff of two of the Polar Bears' NCAA Division III Final Four appearances and the 2001-02 NESCAC women's hockey championship team.

In 2003, Plumer was named the women's hockey head coach at Amherst, where he guided the team to five 20-plus win seasons, three league titles, and an unbeaten streak in NESCAC play that stretched from 2006 to 2010. In that time, Amherst won the 2009 and 2010 NCAA Division III Women's Hockey Championships, becoming the first program in Amherst history to win multiple national titles. Plumer was twice named NESCAC Coach of the Year, as well. After nine seasons and a 127-30-14 record in his final six seasons, Plumer was named the third coach in Vermont women's hockey Division I history, replacing Tim Bothwell.

Under Plumer's guidance, the Catamounts qualified for its first ever Hockey East tournament appearance in 2013. The following season, the school set a program record for wins with 18, and won its first ever Hockey East Quarterfinal series. Plumer was named Hockey East Coach of the Year for his efforts.

== College head coaching record ==
Record table
Season	Team	Overall	Conference	Standing	Postseason
Amherst (NESCAC) (2003–2012)
2003–04	Amherst	13–12–0	7–9–0	5th	NESCAC Quarterfinals
2004–05	Amherst	8–12–5	6–7–3	5th	NESCAC Quarterfinals
2005–06	Amherst	10–15–0	6–10–0	5th	NESCAC Quarterfinals
2006–07	Amherst	20–7–3	10–3–3	3rd	NCAA Division III Final Four
2007–08	Amherst	20–4–4	12–0–4	2nd	NCAA Division III First Round
2008–09	Amherst	24–5–0	16–0–0	1st	NCAA Division III Champion
2009–10	Amherst	23–2–4	12–1–3	1st	NCAA Division III Champion
2010–11	Amherst	19–6–2	13–2–1	2nd	NESCAC Finals
2011–12	Amherst	21–6–1	13–2–1	2nd	NESCAC Finals
Amherst:		158–69–19 (.681)	95–34–17 (.709)		
Vermont (Hockey East) (2012–present)
2012–13	Vermont	8–21–4	6–12–4	8th	Hockey East Quarterfinals
2013–14	Vermont	18–14–4	13–7–1	4th	Hockey East Semifinals
2014–15	Vermont	15–19–2	6–14–1	7th	Hockey East Quarterfinals
2015–16	Vermont	9–25–3	6–15–3	6th	Hockey East Quarterfinals
2016–17	Vermont	15–14–9	9–8–7	5th	Hockey East Semifinals
2017–18	Vermont	10–20–5	7–13–4	8th	Hockey East Quarterfinals
2018–19	Vermont	10–20–6	8–15–4	8th	Hockey East Quarterfinals
2019–20	Vermont	10–18–8	7–14–6	8th	Hockey East Quarterfinals
2020-21	Vermont	6-5-0	6-4-0	4th	Hockey East Quarterfinals
2021-22	Vermont	22-11-3	18-7-2	2nd	Hockey East Semifinals
2022-23	Vermont	21-10-3	16-8-3	2nd	TBD
Vermont:		144–177–47 (.455)	102–117–36 (.471)		
Total:		302–246–66 (.546)			
National champion Postseason invitational champion Conference regular season champion Conference regular season and conference tournament champion Division regular season champion Division regular season and conference tournament champion Conference tournament champion

== See also ==
- List of college women's ice hockey career coaching wins leaders
