= 2019–20 Vermont Catamounts women's ice hockey season =

Women's ice hockey season

- Conference: 8th WHEA
- Home ice: Gutterson Fieldhouse

Record
- Overall: 10–18–8
- Conference: 7–14–6
- Home: 5–9–4
- Road: 5–9–4

Coaches and captains
- Head coach: Jim Plumer
- Assistant coaches: Jess Koizumi; Alex Gettens

The Vermont Catamounts women's ice hockey program represented the University of Vermont during the 2019–20 NCAA Division I women's ice hockey season.

== Offseason ==
=== Recruiting ===
Player	Position	Class	Previous school
Hailey Burns	F	Incoming freshman	
Natalie Ferenc	G	Incoming freshman	
Lily Humphrey	F	Incoming freshman	
Emma Katzman	D	Incoming freshman	
Sara Levesque	D	Incoming freshman	
Cam Morrissey	D	Incoming freshman	
Tynka Pátková	F	Incoming freshman	

=== Departures ===
Player	Position	Nationality	Destination
Melissa Black	G	Graduated	
Great Close	D	Left program	
Taylor Flaherty	D	Shenzhen KRS	
Alyssa Gorecki	F	Graduated	
Sammy Kolowrat	D	Metropolitan Riveters	
Saana Valkama	F	Linköping HC	

== Regular season ==
=== Standings ===
2019–20 WHEA standings
	Conference							Overall					
	GP	W	L	T	PTS	GF	GA	GP	W	L	T	GF	GA
#4 Northeastern	27	24	3	0	48	106	20	36	30	4	2	137	35
#8 Boston University	27	18	6	3	39	77	43	36	24	8	4	108	58
Providence	27	15	10	2	32	58	53	36	18	14	4	85	71
Boston College	27	14	11	2	30	76	69	36	17	16	3	94	97
UConn	27	13	12	2	28	60	54	37	18	17	2	89	80
New Hampshire	27	12	12	3	'27	58	53	36	18	14	4	83	70
Maine	27	9	11	7	25	61	62	36	15	13	8	92	75
Vermont	27	7	14	6	20	65	84	36	10	18	8	85	109
Holy Cross	27	5	20	2	12	27	98	33	5	23	5	36	117
Merrimack	27	2	20	5	9	39	91	34	5	24	5	57	111
Championship: March 8, 2020 † indicates conference regular season champion; * indicates conference tournament champion Rankings: USCHO.com

== Schedule ==
Date	Opponent^{#}	Rank^{#}	Site	Decision	Result	Record
Regular Season
October 4	at RIT*		Gene Polisseni Center • Rochester, New York	Blanka Skodova	W 3-1	1–0–0
October 5	at RIT*		Gene Polisseni Center • Rochester, New York	Skodova	T 4-4 ^{ot}	1–0–1
October 10	St. Lawrence*		Gutterson Fieldhouse • Burlington, Vermont	Skodova	T 2-2 ^{ot}	1–0–2 (0–0–0)
October 11	St. Lawrence*		Gutterson Fieldhouse • Burlington, Vermont	Skodova	W 5-2	2–0–2 (0–0–0)
October 18	New Hampshire		Gutterson Fieldhouse • Burlington, Vermont	Skodova	T 3-3 ^{ot}	2–0–3 (0–0–1)
October 20	Boston College	#7	Gutterson Fieldhouse • Burlington, Vermont	Skodova	L 2-3	2–1–3 (0–1–1)
October 25	at Merrimack		Lawler Rink • North Andover, Massachusetts	Natalie Ferenc	T 4-4 ^{ot}	2–1–4 (0–1–2)
October 26	at Merrimack		Lawler Rink • North Andover, Massachusetts	Skodova	W 6-2	3–1–4 (1–1–2)
October 29	Dartmouth*		Gutterson Fieldhouse • Burlington, Vermont	Ferenc	W 4-2	4–1–4 (1–1–2)
November 8	at New Hampshire		Whittemore Center Arena • Durham, New Hampshire	Skodova	L 1-2 ^{ot}	4–2–4 (1–2–2)
November 9	at New Hampshire		Whittemore Center Arena • Durham, New Hampshire	Skodova	W 1-0	5–2–4 (2–2–2)
November 15	at Connecticut		Mark Edward Freitas Ice Forum • Storrs, Connecticut	Skodova	T 2-2 ^{ot}	5–2–5 (2–2–3)
November 17	at Providence		Schneider Arena • Providence, Rhode Island	Skodova	L 2-3	5–3–5 (2–3–3)
November 23	Boston University		Gutterson Fieldhouse • Burlington, Vermont	Ferenc	L 2-3 ^{ot}	5–4–5 (2–4–3)
November 24	Boston University		Gutterson Fieldhouse • Burlington, Vermont	Ferenc	L 1-5	5–5–5 (2–5–3)
November 29	Penn State*		Gutterson Fieldhouse • Burlington, Vermont	Skodova	L 0-4	5–6–5 (2–5–3)
November 30	Minnesota State		Gutterson Fieldhouse • Burlington, Vermont	Ferenc	L 0-2	5–7–5 (2–5–3)
December 6	at Maine		Alfond Arena • Orono, Maine	Ferenc	W 3-2	6–7–5 (3–5–3)
December 7	at Maine		Alfond Arena • Orono, Maine	Skodova	W 3-2	7–7–5 (4–5–3)
December 30	at Northeastern	#3	Matthews Arena • Boston, Massachusetts	Skodova	L 2-4	7–8–5 (4–6–3)
January 4	Providence		Gutterson Fieldhouse • Burlington, Vermont	Ferenc	W 4-3	8–8–5 (5–6–3)
January 5	Providence		Gutterson Fieldhouse • Burlington, Vermont	Ferenc	L 1-3	8–9–5 (5–7–3)
January 11	Merrimack		Gutterson Fieldhouse • Burlington, Vermont	Skodova	W 4-2	9–9–5 (6–7–3)
January 17	at Boston College		Conte Forum • Chestnut Hill, Massachusetts	Skodova	L 5-7	9–10–5 (6–8–3)
January 18	at Boston College		Conte Forum • Chestnut Hill, Massachusetts	Skodova	T 2-2 ^{ot}	9–10–6 (6–8–4)
January 24	Northeastern	#3	Gutterson Fieldhouse • Burlington, Vermont	Ferenc	L 0-4	9–11–6 (6–9–4)
January 25	Northeastern	#3	Gutterson Fieldhouse • Burlington, Vermont	Skodova	L 2-10	9–12–6 (6–10–4)
January 31	at Boston University		Walter Brown Arena • Boston, Massachusetts	Skodova	L 2-4	9–13–6 (6–11–4)
February 2	Holy Cross		Gutterson Fieldhouse • Burlington, Vermont	Ferenc	T 2-2 ^{ot}	9–13–7 (6–11–5)
February 8	Connecticut		Gutterson Fieldhouse • Burlington, Vermont	Ferenc	L 2-4	9–14–7 (6–12–5)
February 9	Connecticut		Gutterson Fieldhouse • Burlington, Vermont	Skodova	W 6-2	10–14–7 (7–12–5)
February 15	at Holy Cross		Hart Center Arena • Worcester, Massachusetts	Skodova	L 1-2	10–15–7 (7–13–5)
February 16	at Holy Cross		Hart Center Arena • Worcester, Massachusetts	Skodova	L 0-2	10–16–7 (7–14–5)
February 22	Maine		Gutterson Fieldhouse • Burlington, Vermont	Skodova	T 2-2 ^{ot}	10–16–8 (7–14–6)
Hockey East Tournament
February 27	at Northeastern*	#4	Matthews Arena • Boston, Massachusetts	Skodova	L 1-5	10–17–8 (7–14–6)
February 28	at Northeastern*	#4	Matthews Arena • Boston, Massachusetts	Skodova	L 1-3	10–18–8 (7–14–6)
*Non-conference game. ^{#}Rankings from USCHO.com Poll.

== Roster ==
2019-2020 Women's Ice Hockey Roster
No.	Name	Position	Year	Height	Hometown	Previous Team
1	Sierra Natzke	Goalie	JR	5'6	Pine, Colorado	Lansing Spartans
2	Sini Karjalainen	Defense	SO	5'8	Posio, Finland	Finland U-18 National Team
4	Emma Katzman	Defense	FR	5'3	Wilmette, Illinois	Chicago Young Americans
5	Cam Morrissey	Defense	FR	5'6	Troy, Michigan	Selects Hockey
7	Kristina Shananhan	Forward	JR	5'4	Sainte-Anne-de-Bellevue, Quebec	Dawson College
9	Olivia Kilberg	Forward	JR	5'4	Edina, Minnesota	Edina High School
10	Ellice Murphy	Defense	SO	5'4	Roseau, Minnesota	Roseau High School
11	Abby Cleary	Forward	SR	5'8	Buffalo, New York	Quinnipiac
13	Lilly Holmes	Forward	SO	5'5	Saratoga Springs, New York	Westminster
14	Ali O'Leary	Forward	SR	5'4	Reading, Massachusetts	Boston Shamrocks
17	Theresa Schafzahl	Forward	SO	5'8	Weiz, Austria	Austria National Team
19	Val Caldwell	Forward	JR	5'6	Glenview, Illinois	Chicago Mission
21	Allie Granato	Forward	SR	5'3	Plainfield, Illinois	Chicago Fury
22	Alex Gray	Forward	SO	5'7	Brownlee, Saskatchewan	Stanstead College
23	Hailey Burns	Forward	FR	5'5	Kirkland, Quebec	John Abbott College
24	Corinne McCool	Forward	SO	5'8	West Roxbury, Massachusetts	Lawrence Academy
25	Alyssa Holmes	Forward	JR	5'4	Burlington, Ontario	Stoney Creek
26	Ève-Audrey Picard	Forward	SR	5'5	Longueuil, Quebec	Canada U-18 Team
31	Blanka Škodová	Goalie	SO	5'9	Šternberk, Czech Republic	Vermont Academy
38	Natalie Ferenc	Goalie	FR	5'5	Orchard Lake, Michigan	Little Caesars AAA
44	Anna Erickson	Defense	JR	5'4	Stillwater, Minnesota	Minnesota Connections Academy
49	Sara Levesque	Defense	FR	5'3	Chicoutimi, Quebec	John Abbott College
66	Lily Humphrey	Forward	FR	5'5	Huntington Beach, California	New Hampton School
68	Tynka Pátková	Forward	FR	5'5	Meziboří, Czech Republic	HTI Stars
76	Maude Poulin-Labelle	Defense	SO	5'6	Sherbrooke, Quebec	Stanstead College
