= 2020–21 New Hampshire Wildcats women's ice hockey season =

- Conference: WHEA

Record
- Overall: 7-14-1
- Conference: 6-13-1
- Home: 5-6-1
- Road: 2-8-0

Coaches and captains
- Head coach: Hilary Witt
- Assistant coaches: Stephanie Jones; Bill Bowes
- Captain: Ava Boutilier
- Alternate captain(s): Lauren Martin; Maddie Truax

The New Hampshire Wildcats represented the University of New Hampshire in the Women's Hockey East Association during the 2020–21 NCAA Division I women's ice hockey season. Redshirt junior goaltender Ava Boutilier served in the capacity of team captain.

== Regular season ==
=== Standings ===
2020–21 WHEA standings
	Conference							Overall					
	GP	W	L	T	PTS	GF	GA	GP	W	L	T	GF	GA
#2 Northeastern † *	19	17	1	1	51	80	13	25	22	2	1	104	21
#7 Boston College	18	14	4	0	40	56	32	20	14	6	0	58	40
#8 Providence	17	10	6	1	32	43	34	21	12	8	1	50	46
Vermont	10	6	4	0	17	26	18	11	6	5	0	27	21
#7 Boston University	11	6	5	0	18	22	20	12	6	6	0	25	24
UConn	18	8	9	1	28	38	34	20	9	10	1	44	37
Maine	16	7	8	1	24	24	27	18	8	9	1	27	29
New Hampshire	20	6	13	1	20	39	55	22	7	14	1	42	62
Holy Cross	19	4	14	1	13	29	73	20	4	15	1	29	76
Merrimack	16	1	15	0	3	13	64	16	1	15	0	13	64
Championship: March 8, 2021 † indicates conference regular season champion; * indicates conference tournament champion Rankings: USCHO.com; updated March 25, 2021

== Roster ==
=== 2020-21 Wildcats ===
No.	Nat.	Player	Class	Pos	Height	DoB	Hometown	Previous team
1		Nikki Harnett	Sophomore	G	5' 7" (1.7 m)	2001-01-30	Plymouth, Michigan	Armstrong/Cooper Wings (USHS)
2		Julia Scammell	Senior	D	5' 10" (1.78 m)	1999-01-30	Truro, Nova Scotia	Northern Subway Selects
3		Annie Berry	Sophomore	F	5' 3" (1.6 m)	2000-03-13	Milton, Massachusetts	Tabor Academy (USHS)
4		Ciara Wall	Freshman	F	5' 7" (1.7 m)	2001-00-00	Hampton, New Hampshire	Worcester Academy (USHS)
5		Rae Breton	Sophomore	D	5' 8" (1.73 m)	2001-03-06	Brighton, Ontario	Durham West Jr. Lightning (PWHL)
6		Grace Middleton	Senior	F	5' 7" (1.7 m)	1999-01-07	Midland, Michigan	Little Caesar's U19 (HPHL)
7		Avery Myers	Freshman	F	5' 7" (1.7 m)	2002-03-14	Fargo, North Dakota	Minnesota Ice Cougars U19 (US Midget U19)
8		Nicole Kelly	Freshman	F	5' 5" (1.65 m)	2001-02-27	Brantford, Ontario	Brantford Collegiate Institute and Virtual School (PWHL)
9		Paige Rynne	Junior (RS)	F	5' 11" (1.8 m)	1999-06-18	Ancaster, Ontario	Cambridge Rivulettes (PWHL)
10		Lauren Martin (A)	Junior	F	5' 7" (1.7 m)	2000-02-24	Cambridge, Ontario	Cambridge Rivulettes (PWHL)
11		Chavonne Truter	Freshman	F	5' 11" (1.8 m)	2002-02-27	Uxbridge, Ontario	Durham West Lightning (PWHL)
13		Maddie Truax (A)	Senior	D	5' 5" (1.65 m)	1998-08-07	Gardner, Massachusetts	Northern Cyclones 19U (NEWJHL)
16		Jada Christian	Sophomore	F	5' 4" (1.63 m)	2001-02-03	Caledon East, Ontario	Oakville Hornets (PWHL)
17		Brianna Brooks	Freshman	F	5' 9" (1.75 m)	2002-06-28	Whitby, Ontario	Durham West Jr. Lightning (PWHL)
18		Tamara Thierus	Sophomore	F	5' 4" (1.63 m)	2000-10-17	St-Jérôme, Quebec	Stanstead College (CAHS)
20		Kyla Bent	Freshman	D	5' 4" (1.63 m)	2002-03-06	Halifax, Nova Scotia	Rothesay Netherwood School (NAPHA)
22		Talli Warren	Junior	D	5' 7" (1.7 m)	2000-07-28	Mundleville, New Brunswick	Selects Hockey Academy (USHS)
23		Charli Kettyle	Freshman	D	5' 7" (1.7 m)	2002-02-22	Perth, Ontario	Nepean Jr. Wildcats (PWHL)
25		Emily Rickwood	Junior	D	5' 5" (1.65 m)	2000-02-21	Brantford, Ontario	Oakville Hornets (PWHL)
26		Lindsey Dumond	Junior	F	5' 5" (1.65 m)	1999-02-26	Hampton, New Hampshire	Assabet Valley 19U (NEGHL)
27		Brianna Legros	Freshman	D	5' 5" (1.65 m)	2002-04-11	New Liskeard, Ontario	Etobicoke Jr. Dolphins (PWHL)
28		Ellie Sasaki	Senior	F	5' 6" (1.68 m)	1999-00-00	Markham, Ontario	Brampton Jr Canadettes (PWHL)
29		Ava Thewes	Sophomore	G	5' 3" (1.6 m)	2000-05-05	Clarkston, Michigan	Pursuit of Excellence Hockey Academy (CSSHL)
35		Ava Boutilier (C)	Junior (RS)	G	5' 5" (1.65 m)	1999-11-16	Charlottetown, Prince Edward Island	Charlottetown Abbies Bantam AAA (PEIBAAA)

== Awards and honors ==
- Ava Boutilier, Hockey East Co-Player of the Week (awarded January 25, 2021)
- Brianna Brooks, Hockey East Rookie of the Week (awarded January 25, 2021)
- Lindsey Dumond, New Hampshire, 2021 Hockey East Best Defensive Forward Award
- Nicole Kelly, 2020-21 Hockey East Pro Ambitions All-Rookie Team

=== Team Awards ===
- Karyn L. Bye Most Valuable Player Award – Ava Boutilier
- Colleen Coyne Best Defensive Player Award – Maddie Truax and Emily Rickwood
- Sue Merz 7th Player Award – Charli Kettyle
- Tricia Dunn Most Improved Player Award – Lindsey Dumond
- Rookie of the Year Award – Nicole Kelly
- Blue Line Club Award – Lauren Martin
- Dr. Allison Edgar Academic Award – Nikki Harnett
