= 2020–21 Northeastern Huskies women's ice hockey season =

Hockey East Regular Season Champions Hockey East Tournament Champions
- Conference: WHEA
- Home ice: Matthews Arena

Rankings
- USCHO.com: 2

Record
- Overall: 22–2–1
- Conference: 17-1-1
- Home: 13–1–0
- Road: 7–0–1
- Neutral: 2–1–0

Coaches and captains
- Head coach: Dave Flint
- Assistant coaches: Nick Carpenito; Lindsay Berman; Todd Lampert
- Captain: Brooke Hobson
- Alternate captains: Aerin Frankel; Alina Müller; Andrea Renner

The Northeastern Huskies represented Northeastern University in the Women's Hockey East Association during the 2020–21 NCAA Division I women's ice hockey season. In addition to capturing the regular season title, the Huskies defeated the Providence Friars by a 6–2 mark to win the Hockey East postseason tournament.

Qualifying for the 2021 NCAA National Collegiate women's ice hockey tournament, the program ranked as the #1 seed. The Huskies lost to Wisconsin 1–2 in overtime in the national championship game.

On February 9, 2021, it was announced that the Northeastern men's and women's hockey programs will represent the United States of America at the FISU World University Games in Lucerne, Switzerland, from December 11 to 21, 2021.

== Off-season ==
=== Recruiting ===
Player	Position	Nationality	Notes
Ani Fitzgerald	Forward	United; States	Led Gilmour Academy to first-ever USA Hockey Nationals. Played one season in the Provincial Women's Hockey League for Toronto Jr. Aeros.
Molly Griffin	Forward	United; States	Five-year letterwinner in ice hockey and softball at Buckingham Browne & Nichols.
Abbey Marohn	Defense	United; States	Three-year letterwinner at Culver Academy in ice hockey, where she was the 2019 Defensive Player of the Year.
Lily Yovetich	Defense	Canada, United; States	Won USA Hockey Nationals in 2017 with Anaheim Lady Ducks 16U AAA. Played in the Provincial Women's Hockey League with the Barrie Sharks and Ottawa Lady Senators.

== Regular season ==
=== Standings ===
- 2020–21 WHEA standings
  	Conference							Overall					
  	GP	W	L	T	PTS	GF	GA	GP	W	L	T	GF	GA
  #2 Northeastern † *	19	17	1	1	51	80	13	25	22	2	1	104	21
  #7 Boston College	18	14	4	0	40	56	32	20	14	6	0	58	40
  #8 Providence	17	10	6	1	32	43	34	21	12	8	1	50	46
  Vermont	10	6	4	0	17	26	18	11	6	5	0	27	21
  #7 Boston University	11	6	5	0	18	22	20	12	6	6	0	25	24
  UConn	18	8	9	1	28	38	34	20	9	10	1	44	37
  Maine	16	7	8	1	24	24	27	18	8	9	1	27	29
  New Hampshire	20	6	13	1	20	39	55	22	7	14	1	42	62
  Holy Cross	19	4	14	1	13	29	73	20	4	15	1	29	76
  Merrimack	16	1	15	0	3	13	64	16	1	15	0	13	64
  Championship: March 8, 2021 † indicates conference regular season champion; * indicates conference tournament champion Rankings: USCHO.com; updated March 25, 2021

=== Schedule ===
Date	Opponent^{#}	Rank^{#}	Site	Decision	Result	Record Source:
Regular season
December 11	at Boston College		Chestnut Hill, MA	Aerin Frankel W, 1	W 4–1	1–0–0 (1–0–0)
December 13	Boston College		Matthews Arena • Boston, MA	Aerin Frankel, L, 1	L 1–2	1–1–0 (1–1–0)
January 3	Maine		Matthews Arena • Boston, MA	Aerin Frankel, W, 2	W 3–0	2–1–0 (2–1–0)
January 4	Maine		Matthews Arena • Boston, MA	Aerin Frankel, W, 3	W 1–0	3–1–0 (3–1–0)
January 8	New Hampshire		Matthews Arena • Boston, MA	Aerin Frankel, W, 4	W 3–1	4–1–0 (4–1–0)
January 9	New Hampshire		Durham, NH	Aerin Frankel, T, 1	T 2–2 ^{OT}	4–1–1 (4–1–1)
January 12	#7 Providence		Matthews Arena • Boston, MA	Aerin Frankel, W, 5	W 4–0	5–1–1 (5–1–1)
January 17	Maine		Matthews Arena • Boston, MA	Gwyneth Philips, W, 1	W 3–2 ^{OT}	6–1–1 (6–1–1)
January 22	Providence	#7	Matthews Arena • Boston, MA	Aerin Frankel, W, 6	W 4–1	7–1–1 (7–1–1)
January 23	Providence	#7	Providence, RI	Aerin Frankel, W, 7	W 5–0	8–1–1 (8–1–1)
January 26	Connecticut		Matthews Arena • Boston, MA	Aerin Frankel, W, 8	W 2–0	9–1–1 (9–1–1)
January 29	Merrimack College		Matthews Arena • Boston, MA	Aerin Frankel, W, 9	W 5–0	10–1–1 (10–1–1)
January 30	Merrimack College		Matthews Arena • Boston, MA	Gwyneth Phillips, W, 2	W 6–0	11–1–1 (11–1–1)
February 5	at Holy Cross		Hart Center • Worcester, MA	Aerin Frankel, W, 10	W 8–0	12–1–1 (12–1–1)
February 6	Holy Cross		Matthews Arena • Boston, MA	Aerin Frankel, W, 11	W 12–0	13–1–1 (13–1–1)
February 13	at New Hampshire		Durham, NH	Gwyneth Philips	W 6–1	14–1–1 (14–1–1)
February 14	New Hampshire		Matthews Arena • Boston, MA	Aerin Frankel	W 4–1	15–1–1 (15–1–1)
February 19	at Vermont		Gutterson Fieldhouse • Burlington, VT	Aerin Frankel	W 3–1	16–1–1 (16–1–1)
February 20	at Vermont		Gutterson Fieldhouse • Burlington, VT	Aerin Frankel	W 4–1	17–1–1 (17–1–1)
Hockey East tournament
February 28	New Hampshire		Matthews Arena • Boston, MA	Aerin Frankel	W 7–0	18–1–1 (18–1–1)
March 3	Connecticut		Matthews Arena • Boston, MA	Aerin Frankel	W 2–1	19–1–1 (19–1–1)
March 6	Providence		Matthews Arena • Boston, MA	Aerin Frankel	W 6–2	20–1–1 (20–1–1)
NCAA tournament
March 15	vs. Robert Morris	#10	Erie Insurance Arena • Erie, PA	Aerin Frankel	W 5–1	21–1–1 (20–1–1)
March 18	vs. Minnesota Duluth		Erie Insurance Arena • Erie, PA	Aerin Frankel (NU)	W 3–2 ^{OT}	22–1–1 (20–1–1)
March 20	vs. Wisconsin	#2	Erie Insurance Arena • Erie, PA	Aerin Frankel, L, 2	L 1–2 ^{OT}	22–2–1 (20–1–1)
*Non-conference game. ^{#}Rankings from USCHO.com Poll.

== Roster ==
=== 2020–21 Huskies ===
No.	Nat.	Player	Class	Pos	Height	DoB	Hometown	Previous team
1		Alexa Matses	Sophomore	G	5' 8" (1.73 m)		Boxford, Massachusetts	Boston Shamrocks (JWHL)
2		Lauren MacInnis	Senior	D	5' 8" (1.73 m)	1998-10-19	St. Louis, Missouri	Madison Capitols (19U AAA)
3		Gillian Foote	Junior	D	6' 0" (1.83 m)	2000-02-03	London, Ontario	Bluewater Jr. Hawks (Prov. WHL)
4		Molly Griffin	Freshman	F	5' 4" (1.63 m)	2001-06-25	Arlington, Massachusetts	East Coast Wizards (EWHC)
5		Miceala Sindoris	Junior	F	5' 5" (1.65 m)	2000-07-26	Charlestown, Massachusetts	Worcester Academy (NEPSAC)
6		Katy Knoll	Sophomore	F	5' 7" (1.7 m)	2001-01-16	Amherst, New York	Toronto Aeros (Prov. WHL)
7		Brooke Tucker	Junior	D	5' 8" (1.73 m)	1999-12-01	Edina, Minnesota	Edina High School (MSHSL)
8		Andrea Renner (A)	Senior (RS)	F	5' 4" (1.63 m)		Arlington Heights, Illinois	Chicago Young Americans (16U AAA)
9		Emma Jurusik	Junior	F	5' 3" (1.6 m)	1999-09-22	Western Springs, Illinois	Chicago Mission (T1EHL)
10		Brooke Hobson (C)	Senior	D	5' 6" (1.68 m)	1999-05-27	Prince Albert, Saskatchewan	Prince Albert Northern Bears (SFMAAAHL)
11		Alina Müller (A)	Junior	F	5' 5" (1.65 m)	1998-03-12	Winterthur, Switzerland	ZSC Lions (SWHL A)
12		Chloé Aurard	Junior	F	5' 6" (1.68 m)	1999-03-15	Villard-de-Lans, France	Vermont Academy (NEPSAC)
13		Katie Cipra	Senior	F	5' 5" (1.65 m)	1999-06-25	Western Springs, Illinois	Chicago Mission (T1EHL)
14		Sydney Herrington	Junior	F	5' 9" (1.75 m)		Bow, New Hampshire	Bishop Brady High School (NHIAA)
15		Mia Brown	Junior	F	5' 9" (1.75 m)		South Woodstock, Vermont	Kimball Union Academy (NEPSAC)
16		Lily Yovetich	Freshman	D	5' 4" (1.63 m)	2001-08-02	Los Angeles, California	Ottawa Lady Senators (Prov. WHL)
18		Veronika Pettey	Senior	F	5' 4" (1.63 m)	1999-02-18	Potomac, Maryland	Washington Pride (JWHL)
19		Abbey Marohn	Freshman	D	5' 7" (1.7 m)	2002-05-05	Saint Joseph, Michigan	Culver Academy (IHSAA)
21		Maureen Murphy	Junior	F	5' 4" (1.63 m)	1999-12-15	Buffalo, New York	Providence Friars (HEA)
22		Skylar Fontaine	Senior	D	5' 4" (1.63 m)	1998-06-08	East Greenwich, Rhode Island	Belle Tire (T1EHL)
24		Kate Holms	Sophomore	F	5' 2" (1.57 m)	2000-10-06	Norfolk, Massachusetts	East Coast Wizards (EWHC)
25		Ani FitzGerald	Freshman	F	5' 7" (1.7 m)	2001-08-23	Shaker Heights, Ohio	Toronto Aeros (Prov. WHL)
26		Peyton Cullaton	Sophomore	F	5' 7" (1.7 m)	2000-10-23	Lakeville, Minnesota	Lakeville North High School (MSHSL)
27		Megan Carter	Sophomore	D	5' 8" (1.73 m)	2001-05-23	Milton, Ontario	Stoney Creek Jr. Sabres (Prov. WHL)
33		Aerin Frankel (A)	Senior	G	5' 5" (1.65 m)	2000-05-24	Briarcliff Manor, New York	Shattuck-Saint Mary's (MSHSL)
37		Gwyneth Philips	Sophomore	G	5' 7" (1.7 m)	2000-09-17	Athens, Ohio	Pittsburgh Penguins Elite (T1EHL)
42		Tessa Ward	Senior	F	5' 9" (1.75 m)	1999-03-23	Galesburg, Michigan	Lansing Spartans
91		Peyton Anderson	Sophomore	F	5' 5" (1.65 m)	2001-04-18	Arvada, Colorado	Team Colorado (19U AAA)

Coaching staff and program personnel

- Head coach: Dave Flint
- Assistant coach: Lindsay Berman
- Assistant coach: Nicholas Carpenito
- Goaltending coach: Todd Lampert (volunteer)
- Head athletic trainer: Katie Delude
- Operations coordinator: Melissa Piacentini
- Equipment manager: Eric Anastasi

== Awards and honors ==
- Skylar Fontaine, Hockey East Defensive Player of the Week (awarded March 8, 2021)
- Skylar Fontaine, Northeastern, 2021 Hockey East Best Defenseman Award
- Aerin Frankel, 2021 Patty Kazmaier Award
- Aerin Frankel, ARMY ROTC Hockey East Player of the Week (awarded March 8, 2021)
- Aerin Frankel and Alina Mueller, Co-Recipients, 2020–21 Hockey East Player of the Year
- Aerin Frankel, Hockey East Goaltending Champion
- Aerin Frankel, Northeastern, 2021 Hockey East PNC Bank Three Stars Award
- Molly Griffin, Pro Ambitions Hockey East Rookie of the Week (awarded March 8, 2021)
- Alina Mueller, Hockey East Scoring Champion (31 points)

=== All-America honors ===
- Aerin Frankel, 2020–21 CCM/AHCA First Team All-American
- Skylar Fontaine, 2020–21 CCM/AHCA First Team All-American
- Alina Mueller, 2020–21 CCM/AHCA First Team All-American
- Chloe Aurard, 2020–21 Second Team CCM/AHCA All-American

=== HCA awards ===
- Aerin Frankel, Hockey Commissioners Association Women’s National Goaltender of the Month, January 2021
- Aerin Frankel, Hockey Commissioners Association Women’s National Goaltender of the Month, February 2021
- Aerin Frankel, SR Goalie, Northeastern, Hockey Commissioners Association Women’s Goaltender of the Month (March 2021)
- Aerin Frankel, Hockey Commissioners Association Women's Goalie of the Year 2021
- Alina Mueller, Hockey Commissioners Association Women’s Player of the Month (February 2021)
