= 2020–21 Maine Black Bears women's ice hockey season =

- Conference: WHEA
- Home ice: Alfond Arena

Record
- Overall: 8-9-1
- Conference: 7-8-1
- Home: 0-0-0
- Road: 8-9-1

Coaches and captains
- Head coach: Richard Reichenbach
- Assistant coaches: Sara Reichenbach; Trey Flesch

The Maine Black Bears represented the University of Maine in Women's Hockey East Association during the 2020–21 NCAA Division I women's ice hockey season.

== Offseason ==
=== Recruiting ===
Player	Position	Nationality	Notes
Katelyn Arman	Forward	United States	
Peyton Beady	Goaltender	United States	
Brooke Carriere	Forward	Canada	
Rachel Enzler	Forward	Switzerland	
Olivia King	Defense	United States	
Anna Larose	Goaltender	United States	
Kennedy Little	Defense	United States	
Jorden Mattison	Goaltender	Canada	
Elise Morphy	Defense	Canada	
Morgan Sadler	Forward	Canada	

== Regular season ==
=== Standings ===
- 2020–21 WHEA standings
  	Conference							Overall					
  	GP	W	L	T	PTS	GF	GA	GP	W	L	T	GF	GA
  #2 Northeastern † *	19	17	1	1	51	80	13	25	22	2	1	104	21
  #7 Boston College	18	14	4	0	40	56	32	20	14	6	0	58	40
  #8 Providence	17	10	6	1	32	43	34	21	12	8	1	50	46
  Vermont	10	6	4	0	17	26	18	11	6	5	0	27	21
  #7 Boston University	11	6	5	0	18	22	20	12	6	6	0	25	24
  UConn	18	8	9	1	28	38	34	20	9	10	1	44	37
  Maine	16	7	8	1	24	24	27	18	8	9	1	27	29
  New Hampshire	20	6	13	1	20	39	55	22	7	14	1	42	62
  Holy Cross	19	4	14	1	13	29	73	20	4	15	1	29	76
  Merrimack	16	1	15	0	3	13	64	16	1	15	0	13	64
  Championship: March 8, 2021 † indicates conference regular season champion; * indicates conference tournament champion Rankings: USCHO.com; updated March 25, 2021

=== Schedule ===
Date	Opponent^{#}	Rank^{#}	Site	Decision	Result	Record Source:
Regular Season
November 20	at Holy Cross		Worcester, MA	Loryn Porter (W, 1)	W 2-1	1–0–0 (1–0–0)
November 21	at Holy Cross		Worcester, MA	Loryn Porter (L, 1)	L 2-3	1–1–0 (1–1–0)
December 11	at New Hampshire		Durham, NH	Loryn Porter (W, 2)	W 2-1	2–1–0 (2–1–0)
December 12	at New Hampshire		Durham, NH	Loryn Porter (W, 3)	W 2-1	3–1–0 (3–1–0)
December 18	at #7 New Hampshire		Providence, RI	Loryn Porter (L, 2)	L 0-4	3–2–0 (3–2–0)
December 19	at #7 Providence Friars		Providence, RI	W 2-1	4-2-0 (4-2-0)	
January 3	at #3 Northeastern Huskies		Matthews Arena • Boston, MA	L 0-3	4-3-0 (4-3-0)	
January 4	at #3 Northeastern Huskies		Matthews Arena • Boston, MA	L 0-1	4-4-0 (4-4-0)	
January 17	at #4 Northeastern Huskies		Matthews Arena • Boston, MA	L 2-3 ^{OT}	4-5-0 (4-5-0)	
January 23	at Boston University Terriers		Boston, MA	L 0-1	4-6-0 (4-6-0)	
January 24	at Boston University Terriers		Boston, MA	W 2-0	5-6-0 (5-6-0)	
February 5	at Connecticut Huskies		Storrs, CT	L 0-3	5-7-0 (5-7-0)	
February 13	at Merrimack Warriors		North Andover, MA	W 2-1	6-7-0 (6-7-0)	
February 14	at Merrimack Warriors		North Andover, MA	W 6-1	7-7-0 (7-7-0)	
February 19	at Holy Cross Crusaders		Worcester, MA	L 1-2	7-8-0 (7-8-0)	
February 20	at Holy Cross Crusaders		Worcester, MA	T 2-1 ^{SO}	7-8-1 (7-8-1)	
Hockey East Tournament
February 28	at Vermont Catamounts		Burlington, VT	W 3-1	8-8-1 (8-8-1)	
March 3	at Providence Friars		Schneider Arena • Providence, RI	Loryn Porter	L 0-1	8-9-1 (8-9-1)
*Non-conference game. ^{#}Rankings from USCHO.com Poll.

== 2020-21 Black Bears ==
No.	Nat.	Player	Class	Pos	Height	DoB	Hometown	Previous team
1		Peyton Beady	Freshman	G	5' 3" (1.6 m)		Weymouth, Massachusetts	Weymouth High School
2		Taylor Leech	Senior	D	5' 7" (1.7 m)		Bowdoinham, Maine	Assabet Valley
3		Morgan Trimper	Sophomore	F	5' 7" (1.7 m)		Bangor, Maine	Taft School
4		Liga Miljone	Sophomore	F	5' 1" (1.55 m)		Riga, Latvia	Leksands (SDHL)
6		Olivia King	Freshman	D	5' 6" (1.68 m)		Lincoln, Maine	Taft School
7		Ally Trimper	Sophomore	F	5' 2" (1.57 m)		Bangor, Maine	Taft School
8		Kennedy Little	Freshman	D	5' 3" (1.6 m)		Andover, Minnesota	Minnesota Jr. WHITECAPS
9		Ali Beltz	Junior	F	5' 7" (1.7 m)		Sleepy Eye, Minnesota	New Ulm
11		Amalie Andersen	Sophomore	D	5' 8" (1.73 m)		Herning, Denmark	Liknoping HC (SDHL)
12		Nicole Pateman	Sophomore	D	6' 0" (1.83 m)		London, Ontario	London Devilettes
13		Maddie Giordano	Senior	F	5' 8" (1.73 m)		Granby, Connecticut	Loomis Chaffee School
14		Brooke Carriere	Freshman	F	5' 8" (1.73 m)		Aurora, Ontario	Toronto Jr. Aeros (PWHL)
15		Ida Press	Junior	D	5' 8" (1.73 m)		Uppsala, Sweden	Leksands (SDHL)
16		Katelyn Arman	Junior	F	5' 11" (1.8 m)		Fargo, North Dakota	Minnesota Ice Cougars
17		Ella MacLean	Sophomore	D	5' 9" (1.75 m)		Antigonish, Nova Scotia	Northern Subway Selects
18		Ally Johnson	Junior	F	5' 8" (1.73 m)		Milwaukee, Wisconsin	Northern Subway Selects
20		Celine Tedenby	Junior	F	5' 6" (1.68 m)		Örnsköldsvik	Modo Women's (SDHL)
21		Morgan Sadler	Freshman	F	5' 8" (1.73 m)		Erin, Ontario	Mississauga Jr. Hurricanes (PWHL)
22		Rahel Enzler	Freshman	F	5' 5" (1.65 m)		Zug, Switzerland	SC Reinach (SWHL)
25		Daria Tereshkina	Senior	D	5' 6" (1.68 m)		Chelyabinsk, Russia	HTI Stars
26		Ida Kuoppala	Sophomore	F	5' 6" (1.68 m)		Pedersöre	Kiekko-Espoo (Liiga W)
27		Anna Zikova	Senior	F	5' 6" (1.68 m)		Český Těšín	JOSERA BOŽKA
29		Elise Morphy	Freshman	F	5' 6" (1.68 m)		Regina, Saskatchewan	Shattuck St. Mary's
30		Jorden Mattison	Freshman	G	5' 9" (1.75 m)		Fenwick, Ontario	Etobicoke Jr. Dolphins (PWHL)
32		Anna LaRose	Freshman	G	5' 5" (1.65 m)		Albertville, Minnesota	North Wright County Riverhawks (PWHL)
41		Loryn Porter	Senior	G	5' 8" (1.73 m)		North Bay, Ontario	Mississauga Jr. Chiefs (PWHL)

== Awards and honors ==
- Loryn Porter, Finalist, NCAA Women's Hockey Goalie of the Year
- Taylor Leach, Team Maine (representing the top sophomore, junior, or senior student-athlete achieving the highest grade point average for the calendar year 2020)
