= 2020–21 Vermont Catamounts women's ice hockey season =

- Conference: WHEA

Record
- Overall: 6-5-0
- Conference: 6-4-0
- Home: 3-4-0
- Road: 3-1-0

Coaches and captains
- Head coach: Jim Plumer
- Assistant coaches: Jessica Koizumi; Alex Gettens; Taylor Willard

The Vermont Catamounts women's ice hockey program represented the University of Vermont during the 2020–21 NCAA Division I women's ice hockey season.

== Offseason ==
=== Recruiting ===
Player	Position	Class	Previous school
Jessie McPherson	G	Incoming freshman	
Natálie Mlýnková	F	Incoming freshman	
Bella Parento	D	Incoming freshman	
Maddy Skelton	F	Incoming freshman	

=== Departures ===
Player	Position	Class	Destination
Abby Cleary	F	Graduated	
Allie Granato	F	Graduated	
Emma Katzman	D	Left program	
Sierra Natzke	G	Left program	
Ali O'Leary	F	Graduated	
Ève-Audrey Picard	F	Graduated	

== Regular season ==
=== Standings ===
- 2020–21 WHEA standings
  	Conference							Overall					
  	GP	W	L	T	PTS	GF	GA	GP	W	L	T	GF	GA
  #2 Northeastern † *	19	17	1	1	51	80	13	25	22	2	1	104	21
  #7 Boston College	18	14	4	0	40	56	32	20	14	6	0	58	40
  #8 Providence	17	10	6	1	32	43	34	21	12	8	1	50	46
  Vermont	10	6	4	0	17	26	18	11	6	5	0	27	21
  #7 Boston University	11	6	5	0	18	22	20	12	6	6	0	25	24
  UConn	18	8	9	1	28	38	34	20	9	10	1	44	37
  Maine	16	7	8	1	24	24	27	18	8	9	1	27	29
  New Hampshire	20	6	13	1	20	39	55	22	7	14	1	42	62
  Holy Cross	19	4	14	1	13	29	73	20	4	15	1	29	76
  Merrimack	16	1	15	0	3	13	64	16	1	15	0	13	64
  Championship: March 8, 2021 † indicates conference regular season champion; * indicates conference tournament champion Rankings: USCHO.com; updated March 25, 2021

=== Schedule ===
Date	Opponent^{#}	Rank^{#}	Site	Decision	Result	Record
Regular Season
December 19	New Hampshire		Gutterson Fieldhouse • Burlington, VT	Natalie Ferenc W, 1	W 4-2	1-0-0 (1-0-0)
December 20	New Hampshire		Gutterson Fieldhouse • Burlington, VT	Natalie Ferenc L, 1	L 0-2	1-1-0 (1-1-0)
January 1	Holy Cross		Gutterson Fieldhouse • Burlington, VT	Jessie McPherson W, 1	W 4-0	2-1-0 (2-1-0)
January 2	Holy Cross		Gutterson Fieldhouse • Burlington, VT	Blanka Skodova W, 1	W 6-1	3-1-0 (3-1-0)
January 8	at Connecticut		Mark Edward Freitas Ice Forum • Storrs, Connecticut	Jessie McPherson W, 2	W 2-0	4-1-0 (4-1-0)
January 9	at Connecticut		Mark Edward Freitas Ice Forum • Storrs, Connecticut	Jessie McPherson W, 3	W 3-2 ^{OT}	5-1-0 (5-1-0)
February 12	at Boston University		Walter Brown Arena • Boston, Massachusetts	Jessie McPherson W, 4	W 4-0	6-1-0 (6-1-0)
February 13	at Boston University		Walter Brown Arena • Boston, Massachusetts	Jessie McPherson L, 1	L 1-4	6-2-0 (6-2-0)
February 19	Northeastern	#1	Gutterson Fieldhouse • Burlington, Vermont	Jessie McPherson L, 2	L 1-3	6-3-0 (6-3-0)
February 20	Northeastern	#1	Gutterson Fieldhouse • Burlington, Vermont	Jessie McPherson L, 3	L 1-4	6-4-0 (6-4-0)
Hockey East Tournament
February 28	vs. Maine Black Bears		Gutterson Fieldhouse • Burlington, Vermont	Blanka Skodova L, 1	L 1-3	6-5-0 (6-4-0)
*Non-conference game. ^{#}Rankings from USCHO.com Poll.

== 2020-21 Catamounts ==
2020-2021 Women's Ice Hockey Roster
No.	Name	Position	Year	Height	Hometown	Previous Team
2	Sini Karjalainen	Defense	JR	5'8	Posio, Finland	Finland U-18 National Team
3	Bella Parento	Defense	FR	5'5	Montpelier, Vermont	Kimball Union Academy
5	Cam Morrissey	Defense	SO	5'6	Troy, Michigan	Selects Hockey
7	Kristina Shananhan	Forward	SR	5'4	Sainte-Anne-de-Bellevue, Quebec	Dawson College
9	Olivia Kilberg	Forward	SR	5'4	Edina, Minnesota	Edina High School
11	Ellice Murphy	Defense	JR	5'4	Roseau, Minnesota	Roseau High School
12	Maddy Skelton	Forward	FR	5'6	Isanti, Minnesota	North Wright County
13	Lilly Holmes	Forward	JR	5'5	Saratoga Springs, New York	Westminster
17	Theresa Schafzahl	Forward	JR	5'8	Weiz, Austria	Austria National Team
19	Val Caldwell	Forward	SR	5'6	Glenview, Illinois	Chicago Mission
22	Alex Gray	Forward	JR	5'7	Brownlee, Saskatchewan	Stanstead College
23	Hailey Burns	Forward	SO	5'5	Kirkland, Quebec	John Abbott College
24	Corinne McCool	Forward	JR	5'8	West Roxbury, Massachusetts	Lawrence Academy
25	Alyssa Holmes	Forward	SR	5'4	Burlington, Ontario	Stoney Creek
31	Blanka Škodová	Goalie	JR	5'9	Šternberk, Czech Republic	Vermont Academy
35	Jessie McPherson	Goalie	FR	5'9	Chatham, Ontario	Cambridge Rivulettes
38	Natalie Ferenc	Goalie	SO	5'5	Orchard Lake, Michigan	Little Caesars AAA
44	Anna Erickson	Defense	SR	5'4	Stillwater, Minnesota	Minnesota Connections Academy
49	Sara Levesque	Defense	SO	5'3	Chicoutimi, Quebec	John Abbott College
66	Lily Humphrey	Forward	SO	5'5	Huntington Beach, California	New Hampton School
68	Tynka Pátková	Forward	RS FR	5'5	Meziboří, Czech Republic	HTI Stars
76	Maude Poulin-Labelle	Defense	JR	5'6	Sherbrooke, Quebec	Stanstead College
96	Natálie Mlýnková	Forward	FR	5'3	Zlín, Czech Republic	HTI Stars

== Awards and honors ==
- Olivia Kilberg, Hockey East Sportsmanship Award
- Jessie McPherson, Hockey East Rookie of the Year
- Jessie McPherson, Hockey East Pro Ambitions All-Rookie Team
- Jessie McPherson, 2020-21 Hockey East Pro Ambitions All-Rookie Team
- Maude Poulin-Labelle, Hockey East Second Team All-Star
