= 2020–21 UConn Huskies women's ice hockey season =

- Conference: WHEA
- Home ice: Freitas Ice Forum

Record
- Overall: 9-10-1
- Conference: 8-9-1
- Home: 5-4-1
- Road: 4-6-0

Coaches and captains
- Head coach: Chris MacKenzie

The UConn Huskies women's ice hockey program represented the University of Connecticut during the 2020–21 NCAA Division I women's ice hockey season.

== Offseason ==
=== Recruiting ===
Player	Position	Nationality	Notes

== Regular season ==
=== Standings ===
2020–21 WHEA standings
	Conference							Overall					
	GP	W	L	T	PTS	GF	GA	GP	W	L	T	GF	GA
#2 Northeastern † *	19	17	1	1	51	80	13	25	22	2	1	104	21
#7 Boston College	18	14	4	0	40	56	32	20	14	6	0	58	40
#8 Providence	17	10	6	1	32	43	34	21	12	8	1	50	46
Vermont	10	6	4	0	17	26	18	11	6	5	0	27	21
#7 Boston University	11	6	5	0	18	22	20	12	6	6	0	25	24
UConn	18	8	9	1	28	38	34	20	9	10	1	44	37
Maine	16	7	8	1	24	24	27	18	8	9	1	27	29
New Hampshire	20	6	13	1	20	39	55	22	7	14	1	42	62
Holy Cross	19	4	14	1	13	29	73	20	4	15	1	29	76
Merrimack	16	1	15	0	3	13	64	16	1	15	0	13	64
Championship: March 8, 2021 † indicates conference regular season champion; * indicates conference tournament champion Rankings: USCHO.com; updated March 25, 2021

=== Schedule ===
Date	Opponent^{#}	Rank^{#}	Site	Decision	Result	Record
Regular season
November 21	at Providence Friars		Providence, RI	Sam Carpentier-Yelle (L, 1)	L 2–6	0–1–0 (0–1–0)
November 22	Providence Friars		Mark Edward Freitas Ice Forum • Storrs, CT	Tia Chan (T, 1)	T 1–1 ^{OT}	0–1–1 (0–1–1)
*Non-conference game. ^{#}Rankings from USCHO.com Poll.

== Roster ==
=== 2020-21 Huskies ===
No.	Nat.	Player	Class	Pos	Height	DoB	Hometown	Previous team
5		Camryn Wong	Junior	D	5' 4" (1.63 m)		Vancouver, British Columbia	Pacific Steelers (JWHL)
7		Danika Pasqua	Junior	F	5' 6" (1.68 m)		Langley, British Columbia	Pacific Steelers (JWHL)
8		Kaitlyn Yearwood	Sophomore		5' 7" (1.7 m)		Thornhill, Ontario	Toronto Jr. Aeros (PWHL)
9		Natalie Snodgrass (A)	Senior	F	5' 6" (1.68 m)		Eagan, Minnesota	USA U-18 National Team
10		Alexandra-Anne Boyer	Freshman	D	5' 4" (1.63 m)		Saint-Constant, Quebec	Dawson College Blues
12		Coryn Tormala	Sophomore	F	5' 11" (1.8 m)		Sussex, Wisconsin	Milwaukee Jr. Admirals
16		Taylor Wabick	Senior	D	5' 4" (1.63 m)		Winnipeg, Manitoba	Balmoral Hall (JWHL)
39		Samantha Carpentier-Yelle	Junior	G	5' 5" (1.65 m)		Bromont, Quebec	Cegep Edouard-Montpetit (RSEQ)
46		Danielle Fox	Junior	F	5' 7" (1.7 m)		Unionville, Ontario	Whitby Junior Wolves (PWHL)
55		Viki Harkness	Junior	F	5' 7" (1.7 m)		Berwick, Ontario	Ottawa Lady 67's (JWHL)
74		Emily Reid (A)	Senior	D	5' 8" (1.73 m)		Whitby, Ontario	Whitby Jr. Wolves (PWHL)
77		Amy Landry	Sophomore	F	5' 3" (1.6 m)		Beaconsfield, Quebec	Dawson College (RSEQ)
88		Tia Chan	Freshman	G	5' 6" (1.68 m)		Hamilton, Ontario	Burlington Jr. Barracudas (PWHL)

== Awards and honors ==
- Tia Chan, Hockey East Pro Ambitions All-Rookie Team
- Jada Habisch, Hockey East Pro Ambitions All-Rookie Team
