= 2020–21 Boston University Terriers women's ice hockey season =

- Conference: WHEA

Record
- Overall: 6-6-0
- Conference: 6-5-0
- Home: 3-3-0
- Road: 3-3-0

Coaches and captains
- Head coach: Brian Durocher
- Assistant coaches: Liz Keady Norton; Tara Watchorn; Amy Zappen
- Captain(s): Jesse Compher; Nara Elia
- Alternate captain(s): Kaleigh Donnelly; Kristina Schuler

The Boston University Terriers women's ice hockey program represented Boston University during the 2020–21 NCAA Division I women's ice hockey season.

Hockey East announced plans in November for a modified season, due to the ongoing COVID-19 pandemic. Teams played 18 games in a round robin format to determine the regular season champion. The Terriers played home and home series on weekends, with day of game travel, to allow time for testing, except when playing the Vermont Catamounts or Maine Black Bears.

== Regular season ==
=== Standings ===
- 2020–21 WHEA standings
  	Conference							Overall					
  	GP	W	L	T	PTS	GF	GA	GP	W	L	T	GF	GA
  #2 Northeastern † *	19	17	1	1	51	80	13	25	22	2	1	104	21
  #7 Boston College	18	14	4	0	40	56	32	20	14	6	0	58	40
  #8 Providence	17	10	6	1	32	43	34	21	12	8	1	50	46
  Vermont	10	6	4	0	17	26	18	11	6	5	0	27	21
  #7 Boston University	11	6	5	0	18	22	20	12	6	6	0	25	24
  UConn	18	8	9	1	28	38	34	20	9	10	1	44	37
  Maine	16	7	8	1	24	24	27	18	8	9	1	27	29
  New Hampshire	20	6	13	1	20	39	55	22	7	14	1	42	62
  Holy Cross	19	4	14	1	13	29	73	20	4	15	1	29	76
  Merrimack	16	1	15	0	3	13	64	16	1	15	0	13	64
  Championship: March 8, 2021 † indicates conference regular season champion; * indicates conference tournament champion Rankings: USCHO.com; updated March 25, 2021

=== Schedule ===
Date	Opponent^{#}	Rank^{#}	Site	Decision	Result	Record
Regular Season
December 4	at New Hampshire Wildcats		Durham, NH	Corinne Schroeder	W 2-1	1-0-0 (1-0-0)
December 5	at New Hampshire Wildcats		Durham, NH	Ava Boutilier (UNH)	L 3-5	1-1-0 (1-1-0)
December 11	at Connecticut Huskies		Storrs, CT	Tia Chan (UCONN)	L 1-4	1-2-0 (1-2-0)
January 23	Maine Black Bears		Walter Brown Arena • Boston, MA	Corinne Schroeder	W 1-0	2-2-0 (2-2-0)
January 24	Maine Black Bears		Walter Brown Arena • Boston, MA	Loryn Porter (Maine)	L 0-2	2-3-0 (2-3-0)
February 5	Merrimack Warriors		Walter Brown Arena • Boston, MA	Kate Stuart	W 6-0	3-3-0 (3-3-0)
February 7	Merrimack Warriors		J. Thom Lawler Arena • North Andover, MA	Corinne Schroeder	W 2-0	4-3-0 (4-3-0)
February 12	Vermont Catamounts		Walter Brown Arena • Boston, MA	Jessie McPherson (UV)	W 0-4	4-4-0 (4-4-0)
Hockey East Tournament
February 28	at Providence Friars		Providence, RI	Sandra Abstreiter (PROV)	W 3-4	6-6-0 (6-6-0)
*Non-conference game. ^{#}Rankings from USCHO.com Poll.

== 2020-21 Terriers ==
As of September 2020.

No.	Nat.	Player	Class	Pos	Height	DoB	Hometown	Previous team
1		Kate Stuart	Junior	G	6' 0" (1.83 m)	2000-06-17	Chilliwack, British Columbia	Toronto Leaside Jr. Wildcats
2		Alex Allen	Junior	D	5' 8" (1.73 m)	2000-08-30	Abbotsford, British Columbia	Pacific Steelers
4		Grace Parker	Sophomore	D	5' 8" (1.73 m)	2001-02-20	Nepean, Ontario	Dawson College
5		Courtney Correia	Junior	F	5' 6" (1.68 m)	2000-03-12	Whitby, Ontario	Toronto Jr. Aeros
6		Nadia Mattivi	Sophomore	D	5' 9" (1.75 m)	2000-05-02	Baselga di Piné, Trento, Italy	Alleghe Girls/Italian National Team
7		Jesse Compher (C)	Senior	F	5' 8" (1.73 m)	1999-07-01	Northbrook, Illinois	Chicago Mission
9		Clare O'Leary	Freshman	F	5' 8" (1.73 m)	2001-02-15	Hingham, Massachusetts	Tabor Academy
11		Mackenna Parker	Junior	F	5' 6" (1.68 m)	2000-09-11	Clavet, Saskatchewan	Saskatoon Stars
12		Kaleigh Donnelly (A)	Junior	F	5' 8" (1.73 m)	2000-06-30	Wellesley, Massachusetts	North American Hockey Academy
13		Andi Calderone	Freshman	D	5' 8" (1.73 m)	2001-02-12	Kirkland, Quebec	John Abbott College
14		Kristina Schuler (A)	Senior	F	5' 5" (1.65 m)	1999-05-15	Webster, New York	Choate Rosemary Hall
16		Julia Nearis	Sophomore	F	5' 9" (1.75 m)	1999-08-31	Beverly, Massachusetts	Kent School
17		Lacey Martin	Freshman	F	5' 8" (1.73 m)	2002-01-03	Minnetonka, Minnesota	Minnetonka
18		Haylee Blinkhorn	Sophomore	F	5' 4" (1.63 m)	2000-07-31	Oakdale, Minnesota	Hill-Murray
19		Emma Wuthrich	Junior	F	5' 8" (1.73 m)	2000-05-08	Anchorage, Alaska	North American Hockey Academy
20		Julia Shaunessy	Freshman	D	6' 1" (1.85 m)	2002-05-03	Marshfield, Massachusetts	Tabor Academy
21		Madison Cardaci	Freshman (RS)	D	5' 9" (1.75 m)	2002-04-18	Westminster, Massachusetts	Williston Northampton School
22		Rachel Allen	Sophomore	F	5' 6" (1.68 m)	1999-12-02	Cary, North Carolina	Gilmour Academy
23		Tamara Giaquinto	Freshman	D	5' 6" (1.68 m)	2002-03-29	Toronto, Ontario	Appleby College
26		Brooke Ersoy	Sophomore	F	5' 10" (1.78 m)	2001-08-07	Arlington Heights, Illinois	Chicago Mission
27		Nara Elia (C)	Senior	F	5' 7" (1.7 m)	1999-02-03	Saskatoon, Saskatchewan	Okanagan Hockey Academy
28		Catherine Foulem	Freshman	F	5' 7" (1.7 m)	2002-05-06	Dieppe, New Brunswick	Ridley College
30		Corinne Schroeder	Senior	G	5' 11" (1.8 m)	1999-08-17	Elm Creek, Manitoba	Balmoral Hall
31		Nicole McGuigan	Junior	G	5' 8" (1.73 m)	2000-02-14	Huntington, New York	Choate Rosemary Hall

== Awards and honors ==
- Jesse Compher, Hockey East Second Team All-Star
