= 2020–21 Boston College Eagles women's ice hockey season =

Quarterfinals, L, 3-1 vs Ohio State,
- Conference: WHEA
- Home ice: Kelley Rink

Rankings
- USCHO.com: 7

Record
- Overall: 14-6-0 (14-4-0 in WHEA play)
- Home: 7-4-1
- Road: 7-1-0
- Neutral: 0–1–0

Coaches and captains
- Head coach: Katie King-Crowley
- Assistant coaches: Courtney Kennedy; Andie Anastos

The Boston College Eagles represented Boston College in Women's Hockey East Association play during the 2020–21 NCAA Division I women's ice hockey season. The program qualified for the 2021 NCAA National Collegiate Women's Ice Hockey Tournament, ranking as the #6 seed. On January 31, 2021, it marked the 500th game together at BC for head coach Katie Crowley and associate head coach Courtney Kennedy.

In the aftermath of the Frozen Four, it was announced that the Eagles were invited to participate in the Smashville NCAA Women's Hockey Showcase this November at the Ford Ice Center, practice facility of the NHL’s Nashville Predators. Also participating in the tournament will be Division I women's hockey programs Colgate, Mercyhurst and Minnesota.

== Offseason ==
=== Recruiting ===
| Player | Position | Nationality | Notes |
|---|---|---|---|
| Natalie Tulchinksky | Forward | United States | Spent four years of prep hockey at St. Paul’s School, while also playing club hockey with the East Coast Wizards |

== Regular season ==
=== Standings ===
- 2020–21 WHEA standings
  | | Conference | | | | | | | Overall | | | | | |
  | | GP | W | L | T | PTS | GF | GA | GP | W | L | T | GF | GA |
  |---|---|---|---|---|---|---|---|---|---|---|---|---|---|
  | #2 Northeastern † * | 19 | 17 | 1 | 1 | 51 | 80 | 13 | 25 | 22 | 2 | 1 | 104 | 21 |
  | #7 Boston College | 18 | 14 | 4 | 0 | 40 | 56 | 32 | 20 | 14 | 6 | 0 | 58 | 40 |
  | #8 Providence | 17 | 10 | 6 | 1 | 32 | 43 | 34 | 21 | 12 | 8 | 1 | 50 | 46 |
  | Vermont | 10 | 6 | 4 | 0 | 17 | 26 | 18 | 11 | 6 | 5 | 0 | 27 | 21 |
  | #7 Boston University | 11 | 6 | 5 | 0 | 18 | 22 | 20 | 12 | 6 | 6 | 0 | 25 | 24 |
  | UConn | 18 | 8 | 9 | 1 | 28 | 38 | 34 | 20 | 9 | 10 | 1 | 44 | 37 |
  | Maine | 16 | 7 | 8 | 1 | 24 | 24 | 27 | 18 | 8 | 9 | 1 | 27 | 29 |
  | New Hampshire | 20 | 6 | 13 | 1 | 20 | 39 | 55 | 22 | 7 | 14 | 1 | 42 | 62 |
  | Holy Cross | 19 | 4 | 14 | 1 | 13 | 29 | 73 | 20 | 4 | 15 | 1 | 29 | 76 |
  | Merrimack | 16 | 1 | 15 | 0 | 3 | 13 | 64 | 16 | 1 | 15 | 0 | 13 | 64 |
  Championship: March 8, 2021 † indicates conference regular season champion; * indicates conference tournament champion Rankings: USCHO.com; updated March 25, 2021

=== Schedule ===
| Date | Opponent^{#} | Rank^{#} | Site | Decision | Result | Record |
Regular Season
| November 20 | at New Hampshire Wildcats | | Whittemore Center • Durham, NH | Maddy McArthur (BC) | W 6-2 | 1-0-0 (1-0-0) |
| November 21 | New Hampshire Wildcats | | Conte Forum • Chestnut Hill, MA | W 4-1 | 2-0-0 (2-0-0) | |
| November 27 | Providence Friars | | Conte Forum • Chestnut Hill, MA | L 2-3 | 2-1-0 (2-1-0) | |
| November 28 | Providence Friars | | Schneider Arena • Providence, RI | L 2-3 | 2-2-0 (2-2-0) | |
| December 4 | at Connecticut Huskies | | Mark Edward Freitas Ice Forum • Storrs, CT | W 5-3 | 3-2-0 (3-2-0) | |
| December 5 | Connecticut Huskies | | Conte Forum • Chestnut Hill, MA | W 3-1 | 4-2-0 (4-2-0) | |
| December 11 | #2 Northeastern Huskies | | Conte Forum • Chestnut Hill, MA | Aerin Frankel (NU) | L 1-4 | 4-3-0 (4-3-0) |
| December 13 | at #2 Northeastern Huskies | | Matthews Arena • Boston, MA | Abigail Levy (BC) | W 2-1 | 5-3-0 (5-3-0) |
| January 8 | Merrimack Warriors | | Conte Forum • Chestnut Hill, MA | W 5-3 | 6-3-0 (6-3-0) | |
| January 9 | at Merrimack Warriors | | J. Thom Lawler Rink • North Andover, MA | W 3-1 | 7-3-0 (7-3-0) | |
| January 16 | Holy Cross Crusaders | | Worcester, MA | W 5-1 | 8-3-0 (8-3-0) | |
| January 23 | Connecticut Huskies | | Conte Forum • Chestnut Hill, MA | W 2-1 | 9-3-0 (9-3-0) | |
| January 30 | Connecticut Huskies | | Conte Forum • Chestnut Hill, MA | W 3-2 | 10-3-0 (10-3-0) | |
| January 31 | at Connecticut Huskies | | Mark Edward Freitas Ice Forum • Storrs, CT | W 4-0 | | |
| February 12 | #10 Providence Friars | | Conte Forum • Chestnut Hill, MA | W 2-1 | | |
| February 19 | at BU Terriers | | Walter Brown Arena • Boston, MA | L 2-3 | | |
| February 20 | at BU Terriers | | Walter Brown Arena • Boston, MA | W 2-0 | | |
Hockey East Tournament
| February 28 | Connecticut Huskies | | Conte Forum • Chestnut Hill, MA | L 1-5 | | |
NCAA Tournament
| March 16 | vs. Ohio State Buckeyes* | | Erie Insurance Arena • Erie, PA | L 1-3 | | |
*Non-conference game. ^{#}Rankings from USCHO.com Poll.

== Roster ==
=== 2020–21 Eagles ===
| No. | Nat. | Player | Class | Pos | Height | DoB | Hometown | Previous team |
|---|---|---|---|---|---|---|---|---|
| 2 | | Natalie Tulchinsky | Freshman | D | 5' 9" (1.75 m) | | Clifton Park, New York | East Coast Wizards |
| 3 | | Deirdre Mullowney | Sophomore | D | 5' 9" (1.75 m) | | Newton, Massachusetts | Boston Jr. Eagles |
| 5 | | Savannah Norcross | Junior | F | 5' 7" (1.7 m) | | Lynn, Massachusetts | Boston Jr. Eagles |
| 7 | | Maegan Beres (C) | Senior | F | 5' 7" (1.7 m) | | Vancouver, British Columbia | North American Hockey Academy |
| 8 | | Hadley Hartmetz | Sophomore | D | 5' 5" (1.65 m) | | Phoenixville, Pennsylvania | Shattuck St. Mary's |
| 9 | | Maddie Crowley-Cahill | Freshman | D | 5' 9" (1.75 m) | | Haverhill, Massachusetts | Boston Jr. Eagles |
| 10 | | Caroline DiFiore | Sophomore | F | 5' 4" (1.63 m) | | Medfield, Massachusetts | East Coast Wizards |
| 12 | | Olivia Finocchiaro | Junior | F | 5' 5" (1.65 m) | | Saugus, Massachusetts | Boston Jr. Eagles |
| 13 | | Jillian Fey | Junior | D | 5' 5" (1.65 m) | | Nantucket, Massachusetts | Boston Jr. Eagles |
| 14 | | Abby Volo | Sophomore | F | 5' 7" (1.7 m) | | Sudbury, Massachusetts | Mass Spitfires |
| 16 | | Alexie Guay | Sophomore | D | 5' 6" (1.68 m) | | Magog, Quebec | North American Hockey Academy |
| 17 | | Christina Klinoff | Freshman (RS) | F | 5' 7" (1.7 m) | | Concord, Massachusetts | North American Hockey Academy |
| 18 | | Kelly Browne (C) | Junior | F | 5' 6" (1.68 m) | | Burlington, Massachusetts | Boston Jr. Eagles |
| 19 | | Hannah Bilka | Sophomore | F | 5' 5" (1.65 m) | | Coppell, Texas | Shattuck St. Mary's |
| 22 | | Olivia O'Brien | Freshman | F | 5' 4" (1.63 m) | | Duxbury, Massachusetts | Bay State Breakers |
| 23 | | Cayla Barnes (C) | Junior | D | 5' 1" (1.55 m) | | Eastvale, California | East Coast Wizards |
| 24 | | Caroline Goffredo (C) | Freshman | F | 5' 5" (1.65 m) | | Mount Laurel, New Jersey | Boston Jr. Eagles |
| 26 | | Sidney Fess | Freshman | D | 5' 7" (1.7 m) | | Clifton Park, New York | North American Hockey Academy |
| 27 | | Willow Corson | Senior | F | 5' 9" (1.75 m) | | Toronto, Ontario | Mississauga Jr. Chiefs |
| 28 | | Gaby Roy | Freshman | F | 5' 8" (1.73 m) | | Marshfield, Massachusetts | Boston Jr. Eagles |
| 31 | | Kelly Pickreign | Junior | G | 5' 4" (1.63 m) | | Harvard, Massachusetts | East Coast Wizards |
| 33 | | Kelly Lavelle | Junior | G | 5' 5" (1.65 m) | | Needham, Massachusetts | Dexter Southfield |
| 35 | | Maddy McArthur | Junior | G | 5' 8" (1.73 m) | | St. Catharines, Ontario | Oakville Hornets |
| 39 | | Abigail Levy | Junior | G | 6' 1" (1.85 m) | | Congers, New York | Shattuck-St. Mary's/Minnesota State |

== Awards and honors ==
- Cayla Barnes, 2020-21 Second Team CCM/AHCA All-American
- Alexie Guay, Hockey East Defensive Player of the Week (awarded January 18, 2021)
- Gaby Roy, 2021 Hockey East All-Rookie Team
- Gaby Roy, Hockey Commissioners Association Women’s Player of the Month (November 2020)
- Natalie Tulchinsky, Hockey East Rookie of the Week (awarded February 1, 2021)
