= New Brunswick Route 470 =

Highway in New Brunswick, Canada

Coordinates: 46.513279°N 64.987049°W

Route 470

Route information
- Maintained by New Brunswick Department of Transportation

Major junctions
- West end: Route 465 in Fords Mills
- East end: Route 495 in Mundleville

Location
- Country: Canada
- Province: New Brunswick

Highway system
- Provincial highways in New Brunswick; Former routes
← Route 465	→ Route 475

Route 470 is an 18-kilometre (11 mi) long west–east secondary highway in the northwest portion of New Brunswick, Canada.

The route's eastern terminus starts at the intersection of Route 465, west of Fords Mills. The road crosses the St. Nicholas River heading north-east into the community of Clairville. The road then crosses the Coal Branch River then enters the community of Fords Mills where it intersects with Route 510 then continues east through the community of Pine Ridge at the intersection of Route 490. The road here follows the West Branch River on the north bank as the road begins to travel north east through the communities of Ford Bank and West Branch. The Road then begins to follow the St. Nicholas River north passing the western terminus of Route 510 in Mundleville. The last stretch crosses the St. Nicholas River and ends at the intersection with Route 495
