= Brooke Hobson =

Canadian ice hockey player (born 1999)

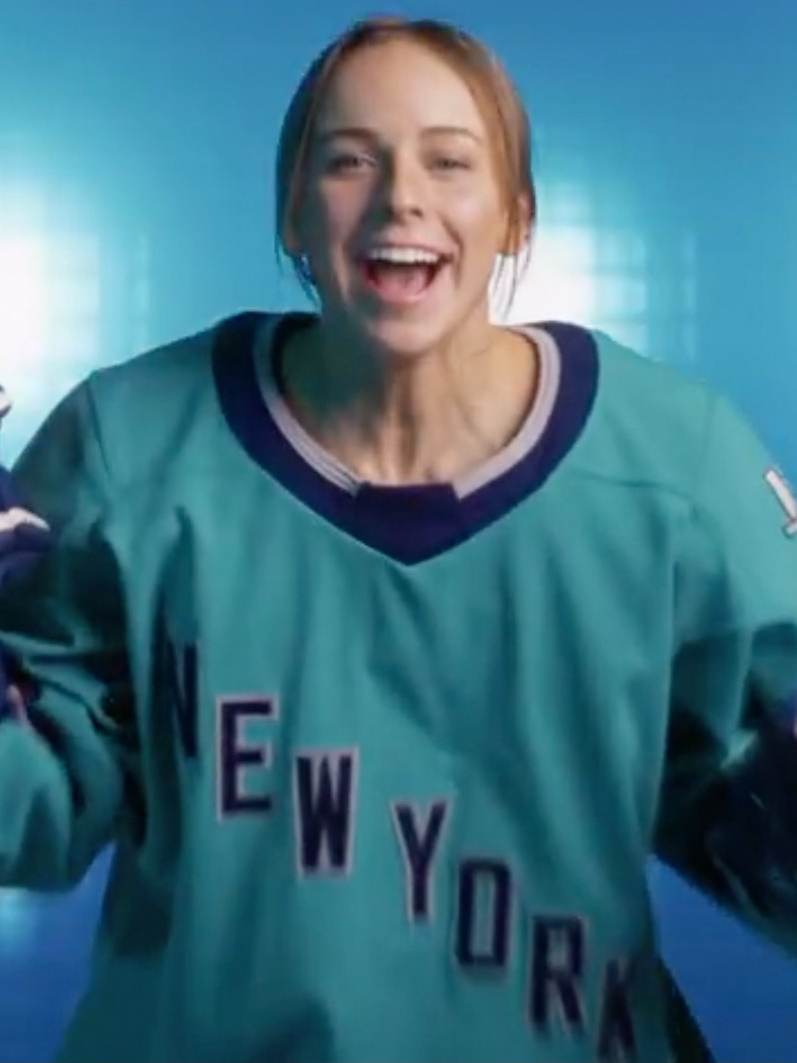
- Hobson with PWHL New York in 2024
- Born: May 27, 1999 (age 27) Prince Albert, Saskatchewan, Canada
- Height: 5 ft 6 in (168 cm)
- Weight: 152 lb (69 kg; 10 st 12 lb)
- Position: Defence
- Shoots: Left
- PWHL team Former teams: Ottawa Charge; New York Sirens; Modo Hockey
- Playing career: 2022–present

Brooke Carole Hobson (born May 27, 1999) is a Canadian professional ice hockey player who is a defender for the Ottawa Charge of the Professional Women's Hockey League (PWHL).

== Playing career ==
=== Collegiate ===
Hobson committed to play college ice hockey for Northeastern University as a high school freshman.

As a freshman in the 2017–18 season, Hobson played in all of Northeastern's 39 games, recording one goal and 15 points. Her first NCAA goal came on October 21, 2017, in a 5–1 victory over Syracuse University.

In the 2018–19 season, her sophomore year, Hobson tallied six goals and 28 points in 38 games and led the team in points on the power play (11) and blocked shots (52). In the 2019 Hockey East Championship semifinals, she recorded an assist on what would become the game-winning goal by Chloé Aurard to lift the Huskies past the University of Vermont. She and the Huskies would go on to win the conference championship.

In 30 games in her junior year, the 2019–20 season, Hobson recorded six goals and 15 points, including a career-best two goals on February 7, 2020, against Merrimack College. She would record an assist in the finals of the Hockey East championship, where the Huskies would defeat the University of Connecticut 9–1 in a Huskies vs. Huskies matchup to secure their third consecutive conference title.

In her senior year in 2020–21, Hobson recorded a career-best five-game point streak with six assists from January 30 to February 14, 2021. She would finish the season with two goals and 14 points in 23 games. The Huskies would enter the 2021 national tournament as the top seed in the NCAA but would lose in overtime of the finals 2–1 to the University of Wisconsin.

Returning as a graduate student for the 2021–22 season, Hobson played in 38 games, tallying six goals on the strength of a career-best three game-winning goals and adding 17 assists for 23 points.

=== Professional ===
At the conclusion of her NCAA eligibility, Hobson moved to Sweden to pursue professional hockey, joining Modo Hockey of the Swedish Women's Hockey League (SDHL). In her first professional season in 2022–23, she recorded 20 points in 30 games and earned a nomination for SDHL defender of the year. At the conclusion of the season, she returned to North America, signing a one-year contract with the Boston Pride of the Premier Hockey Federation (PHF).

Following the summer 2023 buyout and dissolution of the PHF to make way for the Professional Women's Hockey League (PWHL), Hobson was selected 45th overall, in the eighth round of the inaugural PWHL Draft by New York. She signed a one-year contract with the club on November 2, 2023. In the first season of the fledgling league, Hobson played a top-four role for last-place New York. Entering the 2024–25 season, Hobson signed a new one-year contract with the freshly-rebranded New York Sirens. During the season she recorded one goal and three assists in 29 games. On June 20, 2025, signed a one-year contract with the Ottawa Charge.

== International play ==
Medal record

Representing Canada

Women's ice hockey

World U18 Championship
Silver medal – second place	2017 Czech Republic	

Hobson represented Canada at the 2017 World U18 Championship, scoring one goal in five games en route to a silver medal finish. Her lone goal at the event came in the semifinals, a 6–2 victory over Sweden.

== Personal life ==
Hobson learned to skate at three years old, and also grew up playing golf; she is a three-time Saskatchewan junior women's golf champion. She graduated from Carlton Comprehensive High School in Prince Albert, Saskatchewan. She majored in psychology at Northeastern University.

== Career statistics ==
=== Regular season and playoffs ===
			Regular season					Playoffs
Season	Team	League	GP	G	A	Pts	PIM	GP	G	A	Pts	PIM
2017–18	Northeastern University	HE	39	1	14	15	42	—	—	—	—	—
2018–19	Northeastern University	HE	38	6	22	28	48	—	—	—	—	—
2019–20	Northeastern University	HE	30	6	9	15	28	—	—	—	—	—
2020–21	Northeastern University	HE	25	2	15	17	20	—	—	—	—	—
2021–22	Northeastern University	HE	38	6	17	23	18	—	—	—	—	—
2022–23	Modo Hockey	SDHL	32	6	14	20	16	5	1	1	2	0
2023–24	PWHL New York	PWHL	24	1	4	5	14	—	—	—	—	—
2024–25	New York Sirens	PWHL	29	1	3	4	10	—	—	—	—	—
2025–26	Ottawa Charge	PWHL	23	1	3	4	8	8	1	0	1	4
PWHL totals			76	3	10	13	32	8	1	0	1	4

=== International ===
Year	Team	Event	Result	GP	G	A	Pts	PIM
2017	Canada	U18	2nd place, silver medalist(s)	5	1	0	1	0
Junior totals				5	1	0	1	0

== Awards and honours ==
Award	Year	Ref
College
Hockey East Second-Team All-Star	2019, 2021, 2022	
Hockey East Third-Team All-Star	2020	
Hockey East All-Tournament Team	2022	
