= New Brunswick Route 510 =

Highway in New Brunswick, Canada

Coordinates: 46.545757°N 65.027218°W

Route 510

Route information
- Maintained by New Brunswick Department of Transportation

Major junctions
- North end: Route 470 in Mundleville
- South end: Route 470 in Fords Mills

Location
- Country: Canada
- Province: New Brunswick

Highway system
- Provincial highways in New Brunswick; Former routes
← Route 505	→ Route 515

Route 510 is a 40-kilometre (25 mi) long north–south secondary highway in the northwest portion of New Brunswick, Canada.

The route's northern terminus is at Route 470 in the community of Mundleville. The road runs parallel to the south bank of the Richibucto River as it travels south-west. The road continues to the community of Lower Main River and continues on to Targettville and Browns Yard. In Browns Yard, the road merges with Route 490 near Jerrys Island. The road then continues following the Richibucto River, separates from Route 490, and eventually ends in Fords Mills at Route 470.
