= 2020–21 Providence Friars women's ice hockey season =

Quarterfinals, Loss, 0-3 vs Wisconsin
- Conference: WHEA
- Home ice: Schneider Arena

Rankings
- USCHO.com: 9

Record
- Overall: 12-8-1
- Conference: 10-6-1
- Home: 8-2-0
- Road: 4-5-1
- Neutral: 0-1-0

Coaches and captains
- Head coach: Matt Kelly
- Assistant coaches: Ali Domenico; Kate Friesen; Doug Ferry

The Friars qualified for the Hockey East championship game, losing to the top-ranked Northeastern Huskies. Earning an at-large selection for the 2021 NCAA National Collegiate Women's Ice Hockey Tournament, the Friars were ranked as the #7 seed.

== Offseason ==
=== Recruiting ===
Player	Position	Nationality	Notes
Maddy Coene	Forward	United States	Attended Selects Academy at Bishop Kearney

== Regular season ==
=== Standings ===
- 2020–21 WHEA standings
  	Conference							Overall					
  	GP	W	L	T	PTS	GF	GA	GP	W	L	T	GF	GA
  #2 Northeastern † *	19	17	1	1	51	80	13	25	22	2	1	104	21
  #7 Boston College	18	14	4	0	40	56	32	20	14	6	0	58	40
  #8 Providence	17	10	6	1	32	43	34	21	12	8	1	50	46
  Vermont	10	6	4	0	17	26	18	11	6	5	0	27	21
  #7 Boston University	11	6	5	0	18	22	20	12	6	6	0	25	24
  UConn	18	8	9	1	28	38	34	20	9	10	1	44	37
  Maine	16	7	8	1	24	24	27	18	8	9	1	27	29
  New Hampshire	20	6	13	1	20	39	55	22	7	14	1	42	62
  Holy Cross	19	4	14	1	13	29	73	20	4	15	1	29	76
  Merrimack	16	1	15	0	3	13	64	16	1	15	0	13	64
  Championship: March 8, 2021 † indicates conference regular season champion; * indicates conference tournament champion Rankings: USCHO.com; updated March 25, 2021

=== Schedule ===
Date	Opponent^{#}	Rank^{#}	Site	Decision	Result	Record
Regular Season
November 21	Connecticut Huskies		Schneider Arena • Providence, RI	Sandra Abstreiter (W, 1)	W 6-2	1-0-0 (1-0-0)
November 22	at Connecticut Huskies		Mark Edward Freitas Ice Forum • Storrs, CT	Sandra Abstreiter (T, 1)	T 1-1 ^{OT}	1-0-1 (1-0-1)
November 27	at BC Eagles		Conte Forum • Chestnut Hill, MA	Sandra Abstreiter (W, 2)	W 3-2	2-0-1 (2-0-1)
November 28	BC Eagles		Schneider Arena • Providence, RI	Sandra Abstreiter (W, 3)	W 3-2	3-0-1 (3-0-1)
December 4	Holy Cross Crusaders		Schneider Arena • Providence, RI	Sandra Abstreiter (W, 4)	W 2-0	4-0-1 (4-0-1)
December 5	at Holy Cross Crusaders		Worcester, MA	Sandra Abstreiter (W, 5)	W 4-1	5-0-1 (5-0-1)
December 18	Maine Black Bears		Schneider Arena • Providence, RI	Sandra Abstreiter (W, 6)	W 4-0	6-0-1 (6-0-1)
December 19	Maine Black Bears		Schneider Arena • Providence, RI	Sandra Abstreiter (L, 1)	L 1-2	6-1-1 (6-1-1)
January 9	at Holy Cross Crusaders		Worcester, MA	Sandra Abstreiter (W, 7)	W 5-2	
January 12	at #2 Northeastern Huskies	#7	Matthews Arena • Boston, MA	Sandra Abstreiter (L, 2)	L 0-4	
Hockey East Tournament
February 28	Boston University Terriers		Providence, RI	Sandra Abstreiter	W 4-3	
March 3	Maine Black Bears		Schneider Arena • Providence, RI	Sandra Abstreiter	W 1-0	
March 6	at #1 Northeastern Huskies		Matthews Arena • Boston, MA	Sandra Abstreiter (L, 7)	L 2-6	
NCAA Tournament
March 16	vs. #2 Wisconsin Badgers		Erie Insurance Arena • Erie, PA	Sandra Abstreiter (L, 8)	L 0-3	
*Non-conference game. ^{#}Rankings from USCHO.com Poll.

== Roster ==
=== 2020–21 Friars ===
No.	Nat.	Player	Class	Pos	Height	DoB	Hometown	Previous team
3		Maddy Coene	Freshman	F	5' 5" (1.65 m)		Clayton, New York	Selects Academy at Bishop Kearney
4		Lauren DeBlois	Sophomore	D	5' 6" (1.68 m)		Lewiston, Maine	Boston Jr. Eagles
5		Giana Savastano	Senior	D	5' 6" (1.68 m)		Mapleville, Rhode Island	Winchendon School/Islanders Hockey Club
6		Baily Burton	Sophomore	F	5' 7" (1.7 m)		Bloomington, Minnesota	Gentry Academy
7		Lindsay Bochna	Freshman	F	5' 5" (1.65 m)		Toronto, Ontario	Etobicoke Dolphins
9		Hunter Barnett	Junior	F	5' 6" (1.68 m)		Caledon, Ontario	RIT
10		KC Brooks	Freshman	D	5' 6" (1.68 m)		Colorado Springs, Colorado	St. Louis AAA Blues
11		Chloe McNeil	Freshman	F	5' 7" (1.7 m)		Ottawa, Ontario	Ottawa Lady Senators
12		Chloe Gonsalves	Senior	D	5' 4" (1.63 m)		Toronto, Ontario	Toronto Leaside Junior Wildcats
13		Delaney Couture	Sophomore	F	5' 8" (1.73 m)		Shrewsbury, Massachusetts	Eastern Hockey League
16		Chiara Barone	Junior	F	5' 7" (1.7 m)		North Tonawanda, New York	Nichols School / Niagara Jr. Purple Eagles
17		Brooke Becker	Freshman	D	5' 8" (1.73 m)		Orchard Park, New York	Stoney Creek Sabres
18		Ariane Julien	Senior	D	5' 8" (1.73 m)		Saint Hyacinthe, Quebec	Stanstead College
19		Sara Hjalmarsson	Junior	F	5' 9" (1.75 m)		Bankeryd, Sweden	AIK Stockholm (SDHL) / Sweden National Team
21		Isabelle Hardy	Sophomore	F	5' 6" (1.68 m)		Oakville, Ontario	Oakville Hornets
22		Claire Tyo	Freshman	D	5' 6" (1.68 m)		Massena, New York	Ottawa Lady Senators
23		Annelise Rice	Senior	F	5' 7" (1.7 m)		Excelsior, Minnesota	Minnesota Whitecaps/North Dakota Fighting Hawks women's ice hockey
24		Hayley Lunny	Senior	F	5' 4" (1.63 m)		Bedford (town), New York	North American Hockey Academy
26		Jamie Comeau	Sophomore	D	5' 4" (1.63 m)		Wakefield, Massachusetts	East Coast Wizards
28		Caroline Peterson	Junior	F	5' 9" (1.75 m)		East Falmouth, Massachusetts	St. Mark's School (Massachusetts)
30		Sandra Abstreiter	Senior	G	5' 11" (1.8 m)		Freising, Germany	HTI Stars / Team Germany U-18
32		Mireille Kingsley	Freshman	G	5' 9" (1.75 m)		Sudbury, Ontario	Mississauga Hurricanes
33		Katrina Broccoli	Sophomore	G	5' 5" (1.65 m)		North Haven, Connecticut	CT Polar Bears

== Awards and honors ==
- Sandra Abstreiter, 2020-21 Hockey East Third Team All-Star
- Brooke Becker, Hockey East Rookie of the Week (awarded February 1, 2021)
- Brooke Becker, Hockey East Rookie of the Month, February 2021
- Brooke Becker, Hockey East All-Rookie Team
- Lauren DeBlois, 2020-21 Hockey East Third Team All-Star
- Sara Hjalmarsson, 2020-21 Hockey East Second Team All-Star
- Claire Tyo, Hockey East Rookie of the Month, January 2021
- Claire Tyo, Hockey East All-Rookie Team
