= Madison Bizal =

American ice hockey player (born 2000)

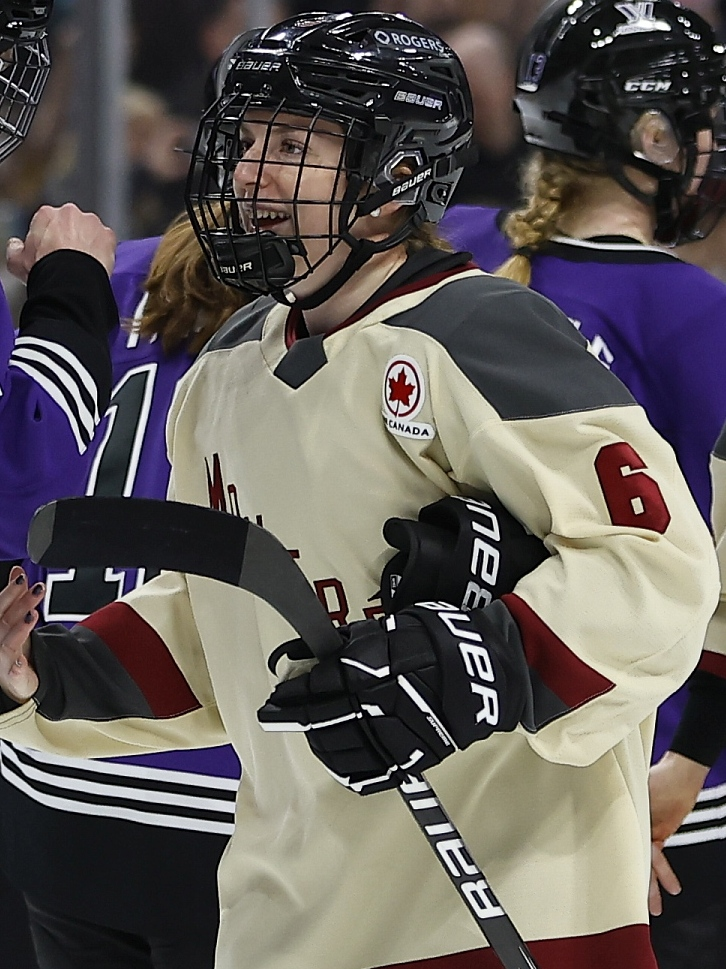
- Bizal with PWHL Montreal in 2024
- Born: January 25, 2000 (age 26) Elk River, Minnesota, U.S.
- Height: 5 ft 5 in (165 cm)
- Weight: 160 lb (73 kg; 11 st 6 lb)
- Position: Defense
- Shoots: Left
- PWHL team Former teams: Vegas Vanguards; Minnesota Frost; PWHL Montreal; SDE Hockey
- Playing career: 2018–present

Madison Bizal (born January 25, 2000) is an American professional ice hockey player who is a defender for the Minnesota Frost of the Professional Women's Hockey League (PWHL). She previously played for SDE Hockey of the Swedish Women's Hockey League (SDHL) and PWHL Montreal of the PWHL. She played college ice hockey at Ohio State.

== Playing career ==
=== College ===
Bizal began her collegiate career for Ohio State during the 2018–19 season. During her freshman year, she recorded six assists in 35 games. She ranked second on the team with 45 blocked shots. During the 2019–20 season, in her sophomore year, she recorded four goals and 12 assists in 38 games. During the 2020–21 season, in her junior year, she recorded one goal and ten assists in 20 games, in a season that was shortened due to the COVID-19 pandemic.

During the 2021–22 season, in her senior year, she recorded three goals and 24 assists in 38 games. She ranked second on the team in scoring among defensemen with 27 points and helped lead the Buckeyes to their first NCAA women's ice hockey tournament championship in 2022. During the 2022–23 season, in her graduate student year, she recorded four goals and 15 assists in 41 games.

=== Professional ===
On June 12, 2023, Bizal signed a two-year contract with the Minnesota Whitecaps of the Premier Hockey Federation (PHF). The PHF ceased operations on June 29, 2023, as a result she never played a game for the Whitecaps.

On September 18, 2023, Bizal was drafted 43rd overall by PWHL Montreal in the 2023 PWHL Draft. During the 2023–24 season, she recorded two assists in 21 games with Montreal. Prior to the 2024–25 season, she was invited to the New York Sirens' pre-season training camp, and was released from the team in November 2024.

On December 16, 2024, she signed a one-year contract with SDE Hockey of the SDHL.

Following pre-season training camp, she signed a one-year contract with the Minnesota Frost prior to the 2025–26 season.

== International play ==
Medal record

Representing United States

Ice hockey

World U18 Championships
Gold medal – first place	2018 Russia	

Bizal represented the United States at the 2018 IIHF World Women's U18 Championship, where she recorded two assists in five games and won a gold medal.

== Personal life ==
Bizal was born to Terrence and Beth Bizal, and has a sister, Jessica, and a twin brother, Connor. Her cousin, Grace Bizal, played college ice hockey at Boston College.

She was diagnosed with nodular lymphocyte predominant Hodgkin lymphoma in November 2020, and was declared cancer free in September 2023.

== Career statistics ==
=== Regular season and playoffs ===
			Regular season					Playoffs
Season	Team	League	GP	G	A	Pts	PIM	GP	G	A	Pts	PIM
2018–19	Ohio State University	WCHA	35	0	6	6	8	—	—	—	—	—
2019–20	Ohio State University	WCHA	38	4	12	16	10	—	—	—	—	—
2020–21	Ohio State University	WCHA	20	1	10	11	4	—	—	—	—	—
2021–22	Ohio State University	WCHA	38	3	24	27	6	—	—	—	—	—
2022–23	Ohio State University	WCHA	41	4	15	19	10	—	—	—	—	—
2023–24	PWHL Montreal	PWHL	21	0	2	2	4	3	0	1	1	0
PWHL totals			21	0	2	2	4	3	0	1	1	0

=== International ===
Year	Team	Event	Result	GP	G	A	Pts	PIM
2018	United States	U18	1st place, gold medalist(s)	5	0	2	2	2
Junior totals				5	0	0	0	2
