= Mundleville, New Brunswick =

Coordinates: 46.585943°N 64.916368°W

Mundleville is a community in Weldford Parish, New Brunswick located at the confluence of the Richibucto River and the St. Nicholas River. Mundleville is located mainly around the intersection of Route 510 and Route 470.

== History ==
Mundleville had a post office from 1899 to 1956. In 1904, Mundleville was a farming settlement with 1 post office, 1 store, 1 church and a population of 125.

== See also ==
- List of communities in New Brunswick
