= 2020–21 NCAA Division I women's ice hockey season =

Ice hockey season

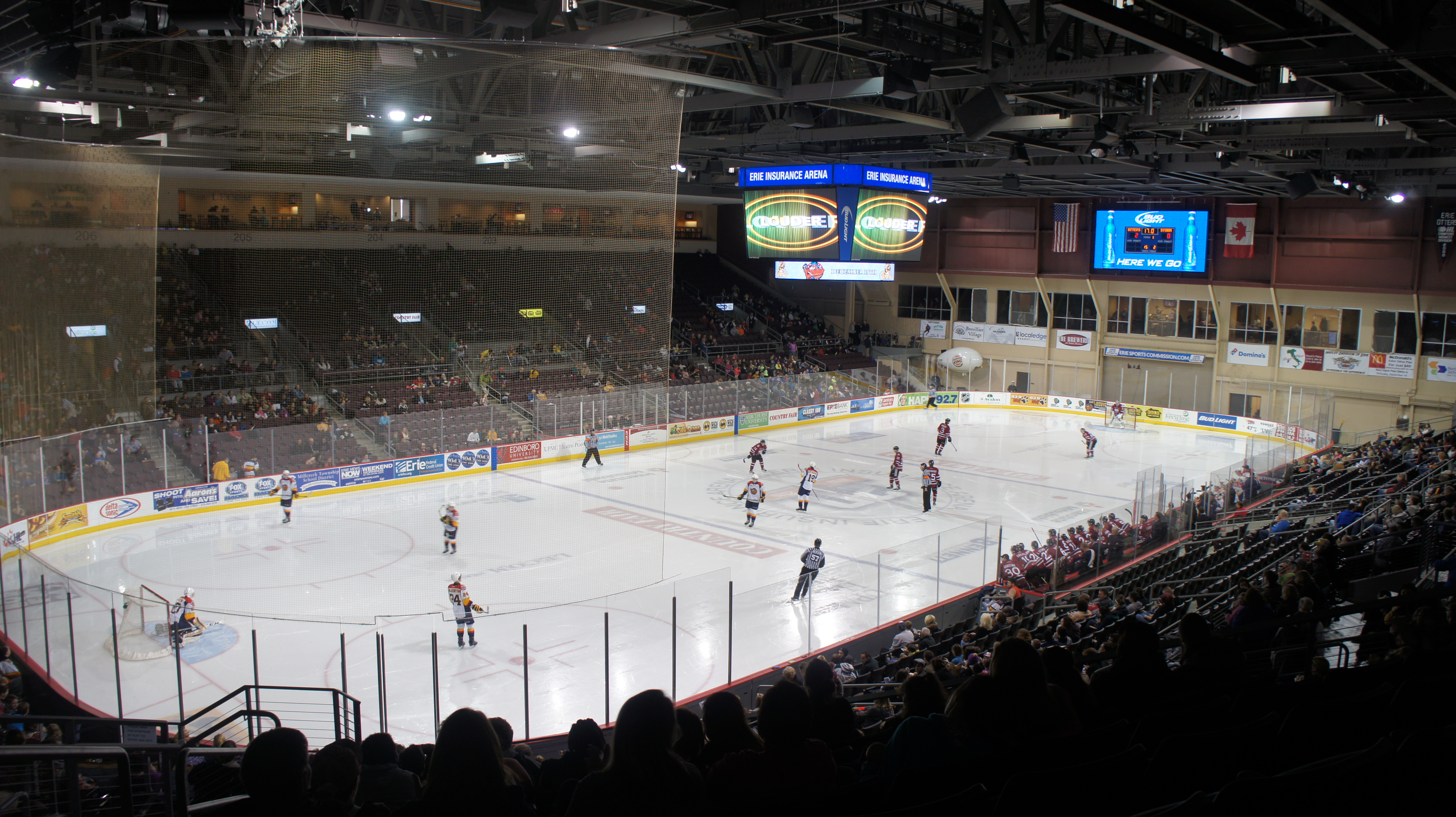
- Erie Insurance Arena in Erie was the site for the 2021 Frozen Four (Women)
- NCAA tournament: 2021
- National championship: Erie Insurance Arena; Erie, Pennsylvania
- NCAA champion: Wisconsin
- Patty Kazmaier Award: Aerin Frankel (Northeastern)

The 2020–21 NCAA Division I women's ice hockey season began in November 2020 and ended with the 2021 NCAA National Collegiate Women's Ice Hockey Tournament's championship game at Erie Insurance Arena in Erie, Pennsylvania on March 20, 2021.

== Regular season ==
=== Standings ===
- 2020–21 College Hockey America standings
  	Conference Regular Season							Overall					
  	GP	W	L	T	PTS	GF	GA	GP	W	L	T	GF	GA
  #8 Penn State†	20	16	2	2	34	70	29	21	16	3	2	72	32
  #10 Robert Morris*	19	11	7	1	23	53	38	25	16	8	1	71	45
  Mercyhurst	17	10	6	1	21	48	34	18	10	7	1	50	37
  Syracuse	15	8	6	1	17	45	28	22	12	9	1	67	39
  Lindenwood	16	2	13	1	5	24	56	17	2	14	1	24	62
  RIT	15	1	14	0	2	9	64	16	1	15	0	9	68
  Championship: March 6, 2021 † indicates conference regular season champion; * indicates conference tournament champion Rankings: USCHO.com
- 2020–21 ECAC Hockey standings
  	Conference							Overall					
  	GP	W	L	T	PTS	GF	GA	GP	W	L	T	GF	GA
  #5 Colgate † *	14	10	4	0	29	34	19	23	15	7	1	61	41
  St. Lawrence	13	6	7	0	18	23	23	13	6	7	0	30	37
  Clarkson	11	3	8	0	11	15	22	19	8	10	1	54	45
  Quinnipiac	10	5	5	0	11	18	26	16	10	6	0	62	30
  Brown	0	–	–	–	–	–	–	0	–	–	–	–	–
  Cornell	0	–	–	–	–	–	–	0	–	–	–	–	–
  Dartmouth	0	–	–	–	–	–	–	0	–	–	–	–	–
  Harvard	0	–	–	–	–	–	–	0	–	–	–	–	–
  Princeton	0	–	–	–	–	–	–	0	–	–	–	–	–
  RPI	0	–	–	–	–	–	–	0	–	–	–	–	–
  Union	0	–	–	–	–	–	–	0	–	–	–	–	–
  Yale	0	–	–	–	–	–	–	0	–	–	–	–	–
  Championship: March 10, 2021 † indicates conference regular season champion; * indicates conference tournament champion Rankings: USCHO.com; updated March 25, 2021
- 2020–21 NEWHA standings
  	Conference							Overall					
  	GP	W	L	T	PTS	GF	GA	GP	W	L	T	GF	GA
  Franklin Pierce	0	–	–	–	–	–	–	0	–	–	–	–	–
  LIU	0	–	–	–	–	–	–	0	–	–	–	–	–
  Post	0	–	–	–	–	–	–	0	–	–	–	–	–
  Sacred Heart	0	–	–	–	–	–	–	0	–	–	–	–	–
  Saint Anselm	0	–	–	–	–	–	–	0	–	–	–	–	–
  Saint Michael's	0	–	–	–	–	–	–	0	–	–	–	–	–
  Championship: March 8, 2021 † indicates conference regular season champion; * indicates conference tournament champion Rankings: USCHO.com
- 2020–21 Western Collegiate Hockey Association standings
  	Conference								Overall					
  	GP	W	L	T	SW	PTS	GF	GA	GP	W	L	T	GF	GA
  #1 Wisconsin † *	16	12	3	1	0	36	62	25	21	17	3	1	79	33
  #4 Minnesota Duluth	16	11	5	0	0	34	50	23	23	12	7	0	55	33
  #3 Ohio State	16	11	5	0	0	32	42	32	20	13	7	0	56	42
  #6 Minnesota	19	11	7	0	1	36	62	40	20	11	8	1	65	45
  Minnesota State	20	7	12	1	0	20	38	56	20	7	12	1	38	56
  St. Cloud State	19	6	12	1	0	18.5	32	62	19	6	12	1	32	62
  Bemidji State	20	2	16	2	1	12.5	24	72	20	2	16	2	24	72
  Championship: March 8, 2021 † indicates conference regular season champion; * indicates conference tournament champion Rankings: USCHO.com; updated March 25, 2021
- 2020–21 WHEA standings
  	Conference							Overall					
  	GP	W	L	T	PTS	GF	GA	GP	W	L	T	GF	GA
  #2 Northeastern † *	19	17	1	1	51	80	13	25	22	2	1	104	21
  #7 Boston College	18	14	4	0	40	56	32	20	14	6	0	58	40
  #8 Providence	17	10	6	1	32	43	34	21	12	8	1	50	46
  Vermont	10	6	4	0	17	26	18	11	6	5	0	27	21
  #7 Boston University	11	6	5	0	18	22	20	12	6	6	0	25	24
  UConn	18	8	9	1	28	38	34	20	9	10	1	44	37
  Maine	16	7	8	1	24	24	27	18	8	9	1	27	29
  New Hampshire	20	6	13	1	20	39	55	22	7	14	1	42	62
  Holy Cross	19	4	14	1	13	29	73	20	4	15	1	29	76
  Merrimack	16	1	15	0	3	13	64	16	1	15	0	13	64
  Championship: March 8, 2021 † indicates conference regular season champion; * indicates conference tournament champion Rankings: USCHO.com; updated March 25, 2021

== Player stats ==
=== Scoring leaders ===
The following players lead the NCAA in points at the conclusion of games played on March 20, 2021.

Player	Class	Team	GP	G	A	Pts
Alina Müller	Junior	Northeastern	25	12	26	38
Daryl Watts	Senior	Wisconsin	21	19	17	36
Kiara Zanon	Freshman	Penn State	21	10	20	30
Skylar Fontaine	Senior	Northeastern	25	14	16	30
Lexi Templeman	Senior	Robert Morris	25	7	23	30
Chloé Aurard	Junior	Northeastern	25	16	12	28
Sophie Shirley	Junior	Wisconsin	21	12	13	25
Grace Zumwinkle	Senior	Minnesota	20	17	7	24
Abby Moloughney	Junior	Syracuse	22	9	14	23
Élizabeth Giguère	Senior	Clarkson	19	9	14	23

=== Leading goaltenders ===
The following goaltenders lead the NCAA in goals against average.

Player	Class	Team	GP	Min	W	L	T	GA	SO	SV%	GAA
Aerin Frankel	Senior	Northeastern	23	1405:47	20	2	1	19	9	.965	0.81
Josie Bothun	Freshman	Penn State	21	1253:38	16	3	2	30	4	.944	1.44
Tia Chan	Freshman	UConn	10	603:27	4	5	1	15	2	.947	1.49
Loryn Porter	Senior	Maine	18	1085:13	8	9	1	27	1	.954	1.49
Emma Söderberg	Junior	Minnesota Duluth	19	1114:21	12	7	0	29	6	.944	1.56

== NCAA tournament ==
National Quarterfinals; March 15 & March 16
1	Northeastern	5
Robert Morris	1
4	Colgate	0
Minnesota Duluth	1*
3	Ohio State	3
Boston College	1
2	Wisconsin	3
Providence	0

National Semifinals; March 18
1	Northeastern	3*
Minnesota Duluth	2
3	Ohio State	2
2	Wisconsin	4

National Championship; March 20
1	Northeastern	1
2	Wisconsin	2*

Note: * denotes overtime period(s)

== Awards ==
=== WCHA ===
Award		Recipient
Player of the Year		Daryl Watts, Wisconsin
Offensive Player of the Year		Daryl Watts, Wisconsin
Defensive Player of the Year		Ashton Bell, Minnesota Duluth
Rookie of the Year		Jamie Nelson, Minnesota State
Outstanding Student-Athlete of the Year		Mak Langei, Bemidji State
Scoring Champion		Daryl Watts, Wisconsin
Goaltending Champion		Emma Söderberg, Minnesota Duluth
Coach of the Year		Mark Johnson, Wisconsin
All-WCHA Teams
First Team	Position	Second Team
Emma Söderberg, Minnesota Duluth	G	Andrea Braendli, Ohio State
Ashton Bell, Minnesota Duluth	D	Emily Brown, Minnesota
Grace Bowlby, Wisconsin	D	Nicole LaMantia, Wisconsin
Daryl Watts, Wisconsin	F	Gabbie Hughes, Minnesota Duluth
Sophie Shirley, Wisconsin	F	Nicole Schammel, Minnesota
Grace Zumwinkle, Minnesota	F	Anna Klein, Minnesota Duluth
Third Team	Position	Rookie Team
Kennedy Blair, Wisconsin	G	Sanni Ahola, St. Cloud State
Sophie Jaques, Ohio State	D	Josey Dunne, Minnesota
Madeline Wethington, Minnesota	D	Riley Brengman, Ohio State
Madison Bizal, Ohio State	D	–
Britta Curl, Wisconsin	F	Jenna Buglioni, Ohio State
Brette Pettet, Wisconsin	F	Abbey Murphy, Minnesota
Tatum Skaggs, Ohio State	F	Jamie Nelson, Minnesota State

=== CHA ===
Award		Recipient
Player of the Year		Kiara Zanon, Penn State
Rookie of the Year		Kiara Zanon, Penn State
Defenseman of the Year		Jessica DiGirolamo, Syracuse
Defensive Forward of the Year		Abby Moloughney, Syracuse
Goaltender of the Year		Josie Bothun, Penn State
Sportsmanship Award		Natalie Heising, Penn State
Coach of the Year		Jeff Kampersal, Penn State
CHA All-Conference Teams
First Team	Position	Second Team
Josie Bothun, Penn State	G	Allison Small, Syracuse
Jessica Adolfsson, Penn State	D	Izzy Heminger, Penn State
Jessica DiGirolamo, Syracuse	D	Rachel Marmen, Mercyhurst
Natalie Heising, Penn State	F	Sara Boucher, Mercyhurst
Lexi Templeman, Robert Morris	F	Abby Moloughney, Syracuse
Kiara Zanon, Penn State	F	Alexa Vasko, Mercyhurst
Rookie Team	Position	–
Josie Bothun, Penn State	G	–
Hannah Johnson, Syracuse	D	–
Lyndie Lobdell, Penn State	D	–
Sara Boucher, Mercyhurst	F	–
Olivia Wallin, Penn State	F	–
Kiara Zanon, Penn State	F	–

=== WHEA ===
Award		Recipient
Cammi Granato Award (Player of the Year)		Aerin Frankel, Northeastern; Alina Mueller, Northeastern
Pro Ambitions Rookie of the Year		Jessie McPherson, Vermont
Hockey East Sportsmanship Award		Olivia Kilberg, Vermont
Hockey East Best Defensive Forward Award		Lindsey Dumond, New Hampshire
Hockey East Coach of the Year		Dave Flint, Northeastern
Scoring Champion		Alina Mueller, Northeastern
Women's Hockey East All-Star Teams
First Team	Position	Second Team
Aerin Frankel, Northeastern	G	Loryn Porter, Maine
Cayla Barnes, Boston College	D	Brooke Hobson, Boston University
Skylar Fontaine, Northeastern	D	Maude Poulin-Labelle, Vermont
Chloé Aurard, Northeastern	F	Jesse Compher, Boston University
Kelly Browne, Boston College	F	Sara Hjalmarsson, Providence
Alina Mueller, Northeastern	F	Ida Kuoppala, Maine
Third Team	Position	Rookie Team
Sandra Abstreiter, Providence	G	Tia Chan, UConn
–	G	Jessie McPherson, Vermont
Lauren DeBlois, Providence	D	Brooke Becker, Providence
Antonia Matzka, Holy Cross	D	Claire Tyo, Providence
Hannah Bilka, Boston College	F	Jada Habisch, UConn
Maureen Murphy, Northeastern	F	Nicole Kelly, New Hampshire
Natalie Snodgrass, UConn	F	Gaby Roy, Boston College
–	F	Millie Sirum, Holy Cross

=== ECAC ===
Award		Recipient
Player of the Year		Danielle Serdachny, Colgate
Best Forward		Danielle Serdachny, Colgate
Best Defenseman		Tanner Gates, Colgate
Rookie of the Year		Kayle Osborne, Colgate
Goaltender of the Year		Lucy Morgan, Colgate
Coach of the Year		Greg Fargo, Colgate
All-ECAC Teams
First Team	Position	Rookie Team
Lucy Morgan, St. Lawrence	G	Kayle Osborne, Colgate
Tanner Gates, Colgate	D	Kristina Bahl, St. Lawrence
Nicole Gosling, Clarkson	D	Nicole Gosling, Clarkson
–	D	Kendall Cooper, Quinnipiac
Julia Gosling, St. Lawrence	F	Kalty Kaltounkova, Colgate
Caitrin Lonergan, Clarkson	F	Olivia Mobley, Quinnipiac
Danielle Serdachny, Colgate	F	–

=== Patty Kazmaier Award ===
Patty Kazmaier Award Finalists
Player	Position	School
Aerin Frankel	Goaltender	Northeastern
Daryl Watts	Forward	Wisconsin Top Three
Grace Zumwinkle	Forward	Minnesota Top Three
Skylar Fontaine	Defense	Northeastern
Élizabeth Giguère	Forward	Clarkson
Caitrin Lonergan	Forward	Clarkson
Emma Maltais	Forward	Ohio State
Alina Mueller	Forward	Northeastern
Sophie Shirley	Forward	Wisconsin
Kiara Zanon	Forward	Penn State

=== AHCA Coach of the year ===
AHCA Coach of the Year Finalists
Coach	School
Dave Flint	Northeastern
Maura Crowell	Minnesota Duluth
Greg Fargo	Colgate
Mark Johnson	Wisconsin
Jeff Kampersal	Penn State
Nadine Muzerall	Ohio State

=== All-America teams ===
First team		Second team	
Player	School	Player	School
Aerin Frankel	Northeastern	Emma Söderberg	Minnesota Duluth
Skylar Fontaine	Northeastern	Chloe Aurard	Northeastern
Alina Mueller	Northeastern	Danielle Serdachny	Colgate
Daryl Watts	Wisconsin	Grace Zumwinkle	Minnesota
Grace Bowlby	Wisconsin	Kiara Zanon	Penn State
Danielle Serdachny	Colgate	Ashton Bell	Minnesota Duluth

=== All-USCHO.com teams ===
First team		Second team		Third team	
Player	School	Player	School	Player	School
Alina Mueller	Northeastern	Chloe Aurard	Northeastern	Anna Klein	Minnesota Duluth
Danielle Serdachny	Colgate	Caitrin Lonergan	Clarkson	Emma Maltais	Ohio State
Daryl Watts	Wisconsin	Grace Zumwinkle	Minnesota	Sophie Shirley	Wisconsin
Ashton Bell	Minnesota Duluth	Grace Bowlby	Wisconsin	Sophie Jaques	Ohio State
Skylar Fontaine	Northeastern	Cayla Barnes	Boston College	Emily Curlett	Robert Morris
Aerin Frankel	Northeastern	Emma Söderberg	Minnesota Duluth	Loryn Porter	Maine

=== HCA Awards ===
- Aerin Frankel, Hockey Commissioners Association Women's Goalie of the Year 2021

==== November ====
- Gaby Roy, Boston College, Hockey Commissioners Association Women's Player of the Month (November 2020)
- Lauren Bench, Minnesota, Hockey Commissioners Association Women's Goaltender of the Month (November 2020)

==== January ====
- Aerin Frankel, WHCA National Goaltender of the Month, January 2021

==== February ====
- Aerin Frankel, Northeastern, WHCA National Goaltender of the Month, February 2021
- Alina Mueller, Northeastern, Hockey Commissioners Association Women's Player of the Month (February 2021)
- Lacey Eden, Wisconsin, Hockey Commissioners Association Women's Rookie of the Month (February 2021)

==== March ====
- Daryl Watts, Wisconsin, Hockey Commissioners Association Women's Player of the Month (March 2021):
- Makenna Webster, Wisconsin, Hockey Commissioners Association Women's Rookie of the Month (March 2021)
- Aerin Frankel, Northeastern, Hockey Commissioners Association Women's Goaltender of the Month (March 2021)
