= 2021 NCAA National Collegiate women's ice hockey tournament =

NCAA women's ice hockey postseason tournament

- Teams: 8
- Finals site: Erie Insurance Arena, Erie, Pennsylvania
- Champions: Wisconsin Badgers (6th title)
- Runner-up: Northeastern Huskies (1st title game)
- Semifinalists: Ohio State Buckeyes (2nd Frozen Four); Minnesota Duluth Bulldogs (9th Frozen Four)
- Winning coach: Mark Johnson (6th title)
- MOP: Makenna Webster (Wisconsin)
- Attendance: 3,016, 778 for Championship Game

The 2021 NCAA National Collegiate Women's Ice Hockey Tournament was a single-elimination tournament by eight schools to determine the national champion of women's NCAA Division I college ice hockey. The quarterfinals were played at the Erie Insurance Arena on March 15 and 16, 2021, with the Frozen Four played on March 18 and 20, 2021 at Erie Insurance Arena in Erie, Pennsylvania. In the last NCAA tournament with eight teams, Providence returned to the tournament for the first time in 16 years. Daryl Watts of the Wisconsin Badgers scored the tournament winning goal in a 2–1 overtime win against the Northeastern Huskies.

== Qualifying teams ==
2021 Qualifying Teams
WCHA, ECAC, Hockey East, CHA

In the sixth year under this qualification format, the winners of all four Division I conference tournaments received automatic berths to the NCAA tournament. The other four teams were selected at-large. The top four teams were then seeded.

Seed	School	Conference	Record	Berth type	Appearance	Last bid
1	Northeastern	Hockey East	20–1–1	Tournament champion	5th	2020
2	Wisconsin	WCHA	12–3–1	Tournament champion	15th	2020
3	Ohio State	WCHA	12–6	At-large bid	3rd	2020
4	Colgate	ECAC	15–6–1	Tournament champion	2nd	2018
	Minnesota Duluth	WCHA	11–6	At-large bid	12th	2019
	Boston College	Hockey East	14–5	At-large bid	12th	2019
	Providence	Hockey East	12–7–1	At-large bid	2nd	2005
	Robert Morris	CHA	16–7–1	Tournament champion	2nd	2017

== Bracket ==
National Quarterfinals; March 15 & March 16; NCAA.com
1	Northeastern	5
8	Robert Morris	1
4	Colgate	0
5	Minnesota Duluth	1*
3	Ohio State	3
6	Boston College	1
2	Wisconsin	3
7	Providence	0

National Semifinals; March 18; ESPN3/ESPNU
1	Northeastern	3*
5	Minnesota Duluth	2
3	Ohio State	2
2	Wisconsin	4

National Championship; March 20; ESPNU
1	Northeastern	1
2	Wisconsin	2*

Note: each * denotes one overtime period

== Results ==
=== National Quarterfinals ===
==== (1) Northeastern vs. Robert Morris ====
March 15; 2:00	Robert Morris	1–5 (0–1, 1–2, 0–2)	Northeastern	Erie Insurance Arena; Attendance: 378

Game reference

Raygan Kirk
Goalies
Aerin Frankel
Referees:
Sarma Ozmen
Mike Kaehler
Linesmen:
Ron Laturi
Glen Hagberg

	0–1	7:57 – Aurard (Müller)
	0–2	28:18 – Fontaine (Aurard)
Curlett (Harley, Templeman) – pp – 39:03	1–2
	1–3	39:56 – Müller (Fontaine, Murphy)
	1–4	47:11 – Cipra
	1–5	54:09 – Fontaine (Knoll, Renner)

2 min
Penalties
4 min
21
Shots
46

==== (2) Wisconsin vs. Providence ====
March 16; 2:00	Providence	0–3; 0–1 / 0–0 / 0–2	Wisconsin	Erie Insurance Arena; Attendance: 217

Game reference

Sandra Abstreiter
Goalies
Kennedy Blair
Referees:
James Visconte
Todd Plouffe
Linesmen:
Brian Kimmins
Michael Bontatibus

0–1	12:54 – Pettet (Bowlby, Curl)
0–2	43:35 – Shirley (Curl)
0–3	58:23 – pp, en – Shirley (Watts)

8 min
Penalties
2 min
12
Shots
44

==== (3) Ohio State vs. Boston College ====
March 16; 7:00	Ohio State	3–1 (0–1, 2–0, 1–0)	Boston College	Erie Insurance Arena; Attendance: 478

Game reference

Andrea Brändli
Goalies
Abbey Levy
Referees:
Katy Guay
Derek Zuckerman
Linesmen:
Coby Mason
Ryan Chauvin

	0–1	9:15 – Norcross (Bilka, Browne
Buglioni (Schepers, Skaggs) – pp – 36:33	1–1
Bink (Levis, Bizal) – 39:23	2–1
Rosenthal (Skaggs, Maltais) – 53:30	3–1

8 min
Penalties
8 min
13
Shots
48

==== (4) Colgate vs. Minnesota Duluth ====
March 15; 7:00	Minnesota Duluth	1–0 (OT) (0–0, 0–0, 0–0, 1–0)	Colgate	Erie Insurance Arena; Attendance: 487

Game reference
Emma Söderberg	Goalies	Kayle Osborne	Referees: Chelsea Rapin; Kelly Cooke; Linesmen: Steven Saul; Evan Cook
66:39 – Bell / 1–0			Referees: Chelsea Rapin; Kelly Cooke; Linesmen: Steven Saul; Evan Cook
2 min	Penalties		Referees: Chelsea Rapin; Kelly Cooke; Linesmen: Steven Saul; Evan Cook
30	Shots	30	Referees: Chelsea Rapin; Kelly Cooke; Linesmen: Steven Saul; Evan Cook

=== National Semifinals ===
==== (1) Northeastern vs. Minnesota Duluth ====
March 18	Minnesota Duluth	2–3 (OT) (0–0, 2–0, 0–2, 0–1)	Northeastern	Erie Insurance Arena; Attendance: 299

Game reference

Emma Söderberg
Goalies
Aerin Frankel
Referees:
Katie Guay
Derek Zuckerman
Linesmen:
Coby Munson
Ryan Chauvin

McMahon (Skinner, Van Wieren) – 30:03	1–0
Anderson (Klein, Flaherty) – 35:30	2–0
	2–1	40:42 – pp – Murphy (Fontaine, Hobson)
	2–2	45:30 – Knoll (Renner, Pettey)
	2–3	79:33 – Fontaine

6 min
Penalties
2 min
28
Shots
47

==== (2) Wisconsin vs. (3) Ohio St. ====
March 18; 12:00	Ohio State	2–4 (0–1, 1–2, 1–1)	Wisconsin	Erie Insurance Arena; Attendance: 379

Game reference

Andrea Brändli
Goalies
Kennedy Blair
Referees:
Chelsea Rapin
Kelly Cooke
Linesmen:
Steven Saul
Evan Cooke

	0–1	01:19 – Webster – (O'Brien, Schneider)
	0–2	01:58 – O'Brien (Schneider)
	0–3	08:21 – Schneider (O'Brien, Webster)
Rosenthal (Brengman, Bizal) – 14:00	1–3
Säkkinen (Levis, Bink) – 07:55	2–3
	2–4	19:46.1 – en – Watts

2 min
Penalties
6 min
39
Shots
23

=== National Championship ===
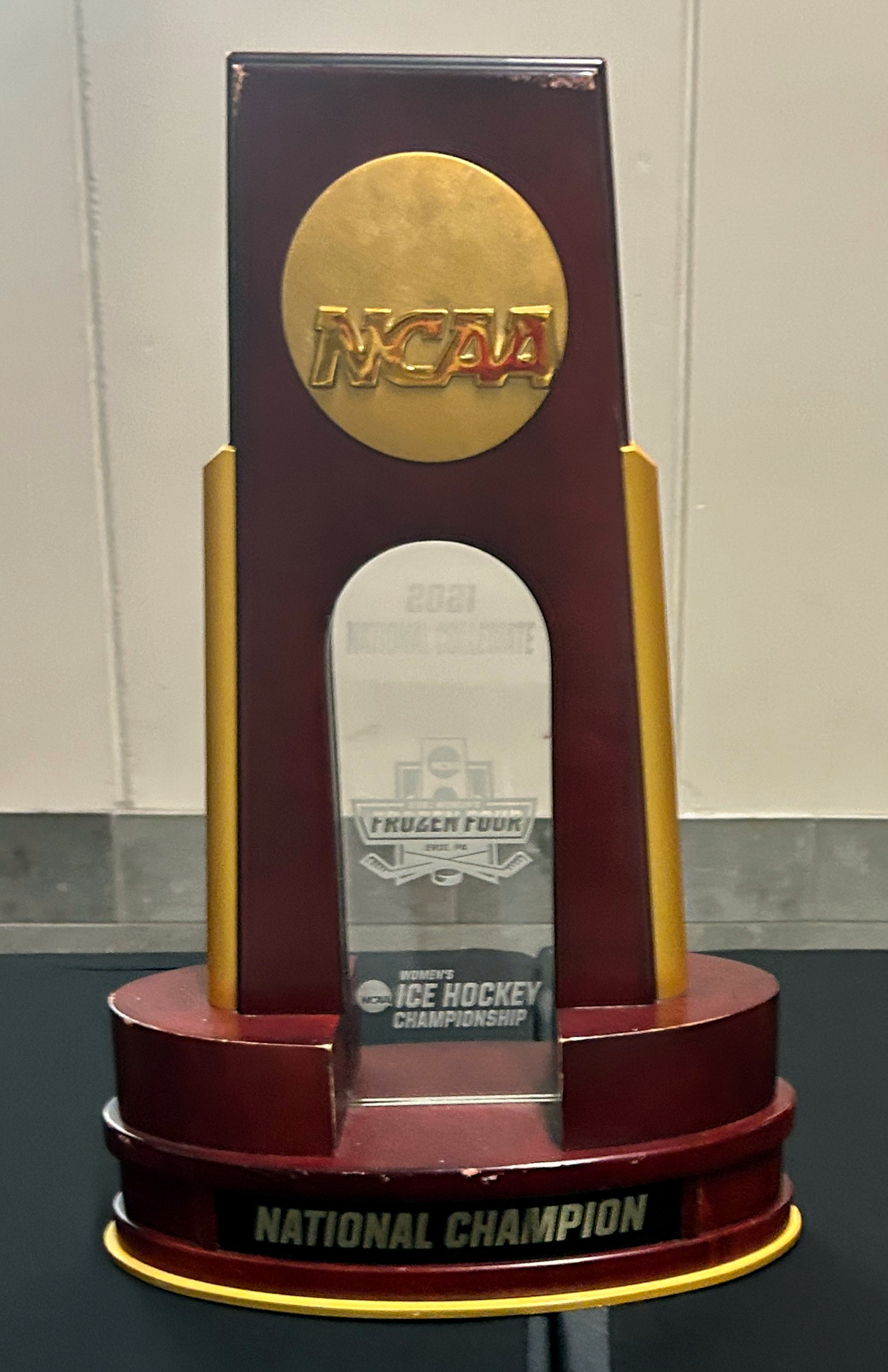
trophy received by Wisconsin

==== (1) Northeastern vs. (2) Wisconsin ====
March 20; 7:30	Wisconsin	2–1 (OT) (0–0, 0–0, 1–1, 1–0)	Northeastern	Erie Insurance Arena; Attendance: 778

Game reference

Kennedy Blair
Goalies
Aerin Frankel
Referees:
Katie Guay
Derek Zuckerman
Linesmen:
Coby Munson
Ryan Chauvin

Webster (O'Brien) – 11:00	1–0
	1–1	11:39 – Aurard (Müller, Hobson)
Watts (LaMantia) – 03:16	2–1

10 min
Penalties
2 min
37
Shots
25

== Media ==
=== Television ===
ESPN had US television rights to the semifinals and national championship after entering into a multi-year contract to carry the event. The Quarterfinals were streamed on ncaa.com while ESPNU and ESPN3 carried the Women's Frozen Four and Championship.

==== Broadcast assignments ====
Quarterfinals

- Scott Sudikoff and Kelly Schultz

Women's Frozen Four and Championship

- Clay Matvick and A. J. Mleczko

== Tournament awards ==
=== All-Tournament Team ===
- G: Aerin Frankel, Northeastern
- D: Ashton Bell, Minnesota Duluth
- D: Skylar Fontaine, Northeastern
- F: Alina Müller, Northeastern
- F: Caitlin Schneider, Wisconsin
- F: Makenna Webster*, Wisconsin

* Most Outstanding Player

== See also ==
- 2021 NCAA Division I Men's Ice Hockey Tournament
- NCAA Women's Ice Hockey Tournament
