= Ava Boutilier =

Canadian ice hockey player (born 1999)

- Born: November 16, 1999 (age 26) Charlottetown, PEI, Canada
- Height: 165 cm (5 ft 5 in)
- Position: Goaltender
- NCAA team: New Hampshire Wildcats
- Playing career: 2017–present

Ava Boutilier (born November 16, 1999) is a Canadian ice hockey goaltender, currently playing for the New Hampshire Wildcats in the NCAA.

== Career ==
Boutilier originally began playing hockey as a defender in the Charlottetown Minor Hockey Association, but quickly got asked to switch to goaltender after her team's goalie got injured. At the bantam AAA level, she played on the Charlottetown Abbies boys' team, winning a provincial title in 2014 and being named Hockey PEI Female Player of the Year in 2014. In 2015, she was named one of the top-six Canadian goalies under the age of 18.

In 2017, she moved to the United States to attend the University of New Hampshire, serving as the starting goaltender for the university's women's ice hockey programme. She was forced to miss most of the 2018–19 season after suffering a shoulder injury. She finished the 2019–20 season with the third highest save percentage of all Hockey East goalies, being named Hockey East Defender of the Week four times. She was named Wildcats captain ahead of the 2020–21 season.

== Personal life ==
At the University of New Hampshire, she served as president of the Student-Athlete Advisory Committee in 2020–21, 2021-2022, and 2022-2023. She previously graduated from Colonel Gray High School in Charlottetown. She currently attends Queen's School of Medicine pursuing her MD.
