= Kelly Browne =

American ice hockey forward

- Born: June 14, 2000 (age 26) Burlington, Massachusetts, United States
- Height: 168 cm (5 ft 6 in)
- Position: Forward
- Shoots: Left
- NCAA team: Boston College Eagles
- National team: United States
- Playing career: 2018–present

Kelly Browne is an American ice hockey forward, currently playing for the Boston College Eagles in the NCAA.

== Career ==
During high school, she first played for Burlington High School, before joining Tabor Academy, serving as the team's captain in her senior year. She picked up a number of awards in 2018, including being named NEPSAC Division I Player of the Year, the Boston Bruins’ John Carlton Memorial Trophy, and Independent School League MVP.

She joined Boston College in 2018, playing for the university's women's hockey programme. She notched 26 points in 39 games in her rookie collegiate year, being named to the Hockey East All-Rookie Team. In late-October 2019, she scored her first collegiate hat trick, notching four goals in a 5–2 victory over the New Hampshire Wildcats, the 11th four-goal game in Boston College history. That year, she improved her point production to 36 points in 36 games. She was named a junior captain for the team for the 2020–21 season, and was named Hockey East Player of the Week in the first week of December 2020.

== International career ==
In 2016 and 2017, Browne attended both the American Girls Select U18 Player Development Camp and USA Hockey Women's National Festival each year. She then represented the United States at the 2018, picking up two points in five games as the country won gold.

She was called up to the senior American national team in February 2020, to make her senior debut in the 2019-20 Rivalry Series against Canada.

== Personal life ==
Browne is enrolled at the Carroll School of Management at Boston College.
