= 2020–21 Merrimack Warriors women's ice hockey season =

- Conference: WHEA
- Home ice: Volpe Complex

Record
- Overall: 1-15-0
- Home: 0-9-0
- Road: 1-6-0

Coaches and captains
- Head coach: Erin Hamlen
- Assistant coaches: Steph Moberg; Chris Hall
- Captain: Megan Fergusson
- Alternate captain(s): Courtney Maud; Dominika Laskova

The Merrimack Warriors represented Merrimack College in the Women's Hockey East Association during the 2020–21 NCAA Division I women's ice hockey season.

== Regular season ==
On January 23, 2021, freshman Aries Mustoe recorded 28 saves in her NCAA debut, a 4-0 loss versus the New Hampshire Wildcats.

=== Standings ===
2020–21 WHEA standings
	Conference							Overall					
	GP	W	L	T	PTS	GF	GA	GP	W	L	T	GF	GA
#2 Northeastern † *	19	17	1	1	51	80	13	25	22	2	1	104	21
#7 Boston College	18	14	4	0	40	56	32	20	14	6	0	58	40
#8 Providence	17	10	6	1	32	43	34	21	12	8	1	50	46
Vermont	10	6	4	0	17	26	18	11	6	5	0	27	21
#7 Boston University	11	6	5	0	18	22	20	12	6	6	0	25	24
UConn	18	8	9	1	28	38	34	20	9	10	1	44	37
Maine	16	7	8	1	24	24	27	18	8	9	1	27	29
New Hampshire	20	6	13	1	20	39	55	22	7	14	1	42	62
Holy Cross	19	4	14	1	13	29	73	20	4	15	1	29	76
Merrimack	16	1	15	0	3	13	64	16	1	15	0	13	64
Championship: March 8, 2021 † indicates conference regular season champion; * indicates conference tournament champion Rankings: USCHO.com; updated March 25, 2021

=== Schedule ===
Date	Opponent^{#}	Rank^{#}	Site	Decision	Result	Record Source:
Regular Season
February 13	Maine Black Bears		North Andover, MA	L 1-2		
February 14	at Maine Black Bears		North Andover, MA	L 1-6		
*Non-conference game. ^{#}Rankings from USCHO.com Poll.

== Roster ==
=== 2020–21 Warriors ===
No.	Nat.	Player	Class	Pos	Height	DoB	Hometown	Previous team
3		Rachel Rockwell	Junior	D	5' 10" (1.78 m)		Broadview Heights, Ohio	Providence Friars
4		Natalie Nemes	Freshman	D	5' 5" (1.65 m)		Kingston, Massachusetts	Tabor Academy

== Awards and honors ==
- Emma Gorski, HEA Defensive Player of the Week (awarded December 14, 2020)
- Julia MacLean, Runner-up to the 2021 Hockey East Association's Sportsmanship Award
