= Skylar Fontaine =

American ice hockey player

- Born: June 8, 1998 (age 27) East Greenwich, Rhode Island, US
- Height: 163 cm (5 ft 4 in)
- Position: Defense
- Shoots: Left
- SWHL A team Former teams: ZSC Lions Frauen; Northeastern Huskies
- Playing career: 2017–present

Skylar Fontaine (born June 8, 1998) is an American ice hockey defensewoman. She has played with the ZSC Lions Frauen of the Swiss Women's League (SWHL A/PFWL) since 2022.

== Playing career ==
Fontaine began skating at the age of two. She played three seasons with the boys' ice hockey team of East Greenwich High School in the Rhode Island Interscholastic League, during which she ranked among the Avengers' leading scorers. In her senior year of high school, she played with Belle Tire U19 in the Tier 1 Elite Hockey League (T1EHL).

Fontaine committed to playing with the Northeastern Huskies women's ice hockey program as a high school sophomore and she joined the team as an incoming freshman in 2017. She scored 14 points in 38 games in her as an NCAA Division I rookie in the 2017–18 season, winning a Hockey East (HEA/WHEA) championship with the Huskies. She then improved to 36 points in 38 games in her second collegiate year, being named to the Hockey East First All-Star Team for the first time. In the 2019–20 season, she notched 42 points in 38 games, leading all Hockey East defenders in scoring and ranking second in the entire NCAA Division I. That year, she was named Hockey East Defender of the Year, the first Northeastern player to ever win that award.

=== Style of play ===
Fontaine has been described as an offensive defender, with strong skating skills and good instincts.

== Personal life ==
Fontaine graduated from Northeastern University with a bachelor's degree in criminal justice and a minor in health science. She was named to the Hockey East All-Academic Team in both 2018–19 and 2021–22.

Her elder sister, Alex Tancrell-Fontaine (born 1992), played NCAA ice hockey with the Garnet Chargers of Union College from 2011 to 2015. Her younger brother, Gunnarwolfe Fontaine (born 2000), played college ice hockey with the Northeastern Huskies (2020–2024) and Ohio State Buckeyes (2024–25) men's programs. He was drafted 202nd overall by the Nashville Predators in the 2020 NHL entry draft.

== Awards and honors ==
Award	Year
Switzerland
Women's League Champion	2022–23
Women's League Champion	2023–24
Women's League Best Defender	2022–23
Swiss Women's Hockey Cup Champion	2022–23
College
AHCA All-American Second Team	2018–19
AHCA All-American Second Team	2019–20
Hockey East All-Star First Team	2018–19
Hockey East All-Star First Team	2019–20
Hockey East All-Star First Team	2020–21
Hockey East All-Star First Team	2021–22
All-USCHO Second Team	2018–19
All-USCHO Second Team	2019–20
Hockey East All-Tournament Team	2019
Hockey East All-Tournament Team	2020
Hockey East All-Tournament Team	2021
Hockey East All-Tournament Team	2022
Hockey East Best Defenseman	2019–20
Hockey East Best Defenseman	2020–21
Hockey East Best Defenseman	2021–22
NEWHA Division I All-Star	2019–20
NEWHA Division I All-Star	2021–22
AHCA All-American First Team	2020–21
AHCA All-American First Team	2021–22
Patty Kazmaier Award, Top-10 Finalist	2020–21
Patty Kazmaier Award, Top-10 Finalist	2021–22
All-USCHO First Team	2020–21
All-USCHO First Team	2021–22
NCAA All-Tournament team	2021
NCAA All-Tournament team	2022
