= Chloé Aurard-Bushee =

French ice hockey player (born 1999)

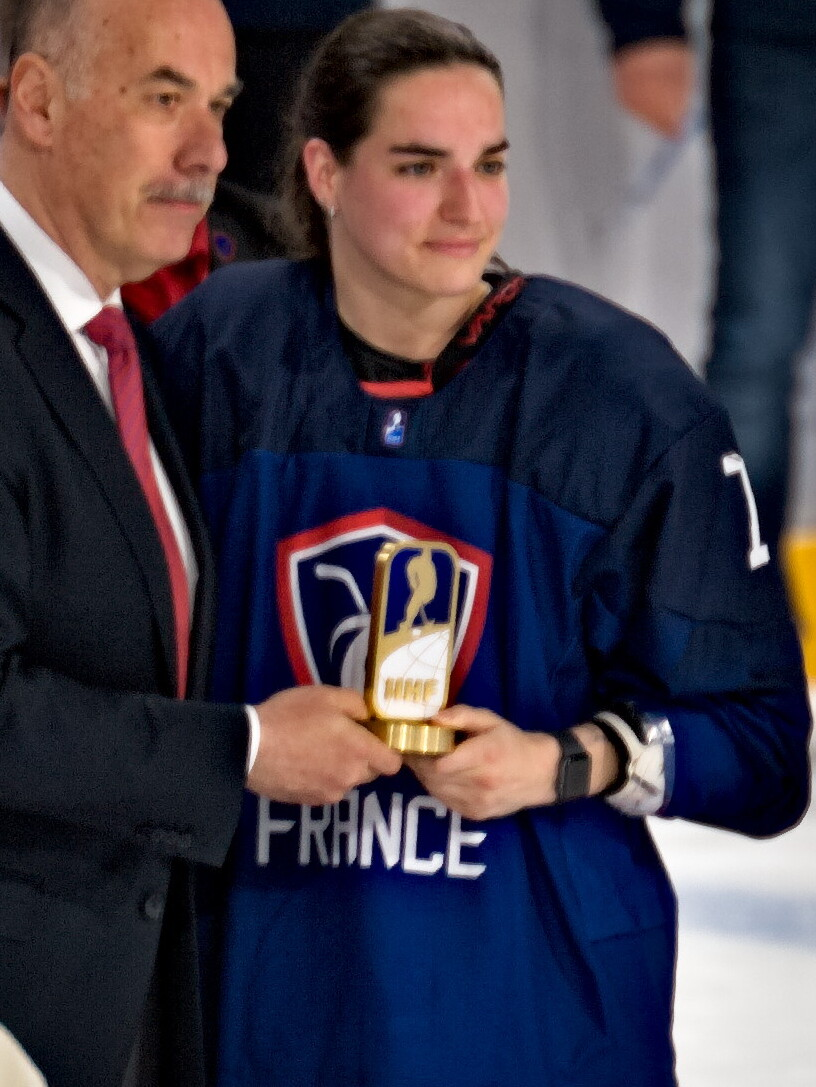
- Aurard (right) with France in 2022
- Born: 15 March 1999 (age 27) Saint-Martin-d'Hères, France
- Height: 1.68 m (5 ft 6 in)
- Weight: 65 kg (143 lb; 10 st 3 lb)
- Position: Forward
- Shoots: Left
- PFWL team Former teams: ZSC Lions; New York Sirens
- National team: France
- Playing career: 2023–present

Chloé Aurard-Bushee (née Aurard; born 15 March 1999) is a French professional ice hockey player who is a forward for the ZSC Lions of the Swiss Women's League (PFWL) and member of the French national team. She previously played for the New York Sirens.

== Playing career ==
=== Pre-college career ===
In the 2013–14 season, Aurard played in the France women's ice hockey league, the top level of women's ice hockey in the country. In a season that began when she was just 14 years old, she ranked second in league scoring with 17 goals and 24 points in 11 games.

Aurard attended Vermont Academy, where in addition to hockey she played soccer, softball, and tennis. In the 2017–18 season, Vermont won the New England Preparatory School Athletic Council (NEPSAC) championship and Aurard was named league MVP.

=== Collegiate career ===
Aurard made her debut for Northeasten University in the 2018–19 season. Her first career point came on 5 October 2018, scoring a shorthanded goal in a 5–0 victory over Boston University. She would go on to record 12 goals and 31 points in 35 games, earning Hockey East first-team all-star honors. She and Northeastern won the Hockey East championship.

Aurard's sophomore season saw her scoring increase to 21 goals and 49 points in 38 games, including a five-point outing against College of the Holy Cross on 29 November 2019, one of an NCAA-leading two hat-tricks. She was named a first-team Hockey East all-star for the second time, and was named to the conference's all-tournament team as she and the Huskies again won the Hockey East championship.

The 2020–21 season saw Aurard lead the NCAA in game-winning goals and shorthanded goals, with six and three, respectively. She recorded her third career hat-trick in February 2021, and finished in the top 10 in goal scoring, with 15. Northeastern won their fourth consecutive Hockey East title, Aurard's third, and she was named to the first all-conference team for the third time in three years.

In her senior year, the 2021–22 season, Aurard recorded 20 goals and 42 points, as well as her fourth career hat-trick. She was named to the conference all-tournament team for the second time as the Huskies once again won the Hockey East conference, and was named to the second all-conference team, her fourth all-star team nod in as many years.

Returning for her final year of NCAA eligibility, Aurard finished eighth in the country with a career-best 54 points in 38 games as Northeastern clinched yet another Hockey East title. She was named to the second all-conference team, achieving all-Hockey East honors and winning the conference in every year of her collegiate career. She finished her time with the Huskies fourth in team all-time points (204) and goals (89), and third in assists (115).

=== Professional career ===
Aurard signed with the Boston Pride of the Premier Hockey Federation (PHF) on 12 May 2023, shortly after the team signed fellow Northeastern alumnus Alina Müller. They would never play for the club, as the PHF would be bought out and dissolved to make way for the Professional Women's Hockey League (PWHL).

On 18 September 2023, Aurard was selected 21st overall in the 4th round of the 2023 PWHL Draft by New York, becoming the first French player to be affiliated with a PWHL team. She signed a two-year contract with the club on 13 November 2023. In the team's inaugural outing, a 4–0 victory over Toronto, she recorded two assists. She scored her first PWHL goal on 28 February 2024, in a 4–2 loss to Ottawa, becoming the first player from France to score a goal in the league. She would finish the season with one goal and eight points.

In her second season with the Sirens in 2024–25, Aurard averaged just 7:24 in time on ice, recording only four points in 27 games. On June 18, 2025, Aurard signed a one-year contract with the Boston Fleet, but would be cut from the roster following training camp. On November 28, the ZSC Lions of the Swiss Women's League (PFWL) announced that they had signed Aurard to a contract effective January 1, 2026, through the end of the season.

== International play ==
Medal record

Representing France

Women's ice hockey

World Championship
| Gold medal – first place | 2018 France | Division I Group A |
| Gold medal – first place | 2022 France | Division I Group A |
| Silver medal – second place | 2016 Denmark | Division I Group A |
| Bronze medal – third place | 2015 France | Division I Group A |
| Bronze medal – third place | 2024 Austria | Division I Group A |

World U18 Championship
| Gold medal – first place | 2015 France | Division I |
| Silver medal – second place | 2014 Germany | Division I |

Aurard made her first appearance at the IIHF World Women's U18 Championships in 2014.

At 16 years old, Aurard made her international senior debut, representing France at the 2015 World Championship Division IA.

Aurard was named captain of the French squad at the 2016 IIHF World Women's U18 Championship.

The French team, featuring Aurard, appeared in the IIHF's top division in 2019 and 2023, but finished last and were relegated at both events.

Aurard represented France at the 2024 World Championship Division IA and finished in third, narrowly missing the second-place promotion slot with a 2–1 loss to Hungary on the final day of the tournament.

== Personal life ==
Aurard has a brother and a twin sister, Anais, who also plays hockey. She has a bachelor's degree in media, art, and communication.

On 9 June 2024, Aurard announced her engagement to her girlfriend, Ella Bushee. They got married in October 2025, and both took the hyphenated last name Aurard-Bushee.

== Career statistics ==
=== Regular season and playoffs ===
| | | | Regular season | | | | | Playoffs |
| Season | Team | League | GP | G | A | Pts | PIM | GP | G | A | Pts | PIM |
|---|---|---|---|---|---|---|---|---|---|---|---|---|
| 2013–14 | Gap | France | 11 | 17 | 7 | 24 | 8 | 2 | 0 | 1 | 1 | 0 |
| 2016–17 | Ours de Villard-de-Lans | FRA U17 (Men's) | 2 | 0 | 0 | 0 | 4 | — | — | — | — | — |
| 2018–19 | Northeastern University | HE | 35 | 12 | 19 | 31 | 18 | — | — | — | — | — |
| 2019–20 | Northeastern University | HE | 38 | 21 | 28 | 49 | 18 | — | — | — | — | — |
| 2020–21 | Northeastern University | HE | 25 | 16 | 12 | 28 | 12 | — | — | — | — | — |
| 2021–22 | Northeastern University | HE | 31 | 20 | 22 | 42 | 22 | — | — | — | — | — |
| 2022–23 | Northeastern University | HE | 38 | 20 | 34 | 54 | 14 | — | — | — | — | — |
| 2023–24 | PWHL New York | PWHL | 21 | 1 | 7 | 8 | 2 | — | — | — | — | — |
| 2024–25 | New York Sirens | PWHL | 27 | 2 | 2 | 4 | 2 | — | — | — | — | — |
| PWHL totals | | | 48 | 3 | 9 | 12 | 4 | — | — | — | — | — |

=== International ===
| Year | Team | Event | Result | GP | G | A | Pts | PIM |
|---|---|---|---|---|---|---|---|---|
| 2014 | France | U18 (Div I) | 2nd place, silver medalist(s) | 5 | 5 | 0 | 5 | 2 |
| 2015 | France | U18 (Div I) | 1st place, gold medalist(s) | 5 | 3 | 5 | 8 | 0 |
| 2015 | France | WC (Div IA) | 3rd place, bronze medalist(s) | 5 | 1 | 1 | 2 | 2 |
| 2016 | France | U18 (Div I) | 8th | 5 | 1 | 1 | 2 | 12 |
| 2016 | France | WC (Div IA) | 2nd place, silver medalist(s) | 5 | 1 | 4 | 5 | 2 |
| 2017 | France | WC (Div IA) | 6th | 5 | 0 | 0 | 0 | 0 |
| 2018 | France | WC (Div IA) | 1st place, gold medalist(s) | 5 | 4 | 1 | 5 | 12 |
| 2019 | France | WC | 10th | 5 | 2 | 1 | 3 | 2 |
| 2022 | France | WC (Div IA) | 1st place, gold medalist(s) | 4 | 4 | 4 | 8 | 0 |
| 2023 | France | WC | 10th | 4 | 0 | 1 | 1 | 4 |
| 2024 | France | WC (Div IA) | 3rd place, bronze medalist(s) | 5 | 1 | 6 | 7 | 0 |
| 2025 | France | WC (Div IA) | 4th | 5 | 2 | 5 | 7 | 20 |
| 2026 | France | OG | 10th | 4 | 0 | 1 | 1 | 6 |
| Junior totals | | | | 15 | 9 | 6 | 15 | 14 |
| Senior totals | | | | 47 | 15 | 23 | 39 | 48 |

== Awards and honors ==
| Award | Year | Ref |
NCAA
| NEHWA Division I All-Star | 2020, 2023 | |
| Second Team AHCA All-American | 2021 | |
| Second Team All-USCHO | 2021 | |
Hockey East
| First Team All-Star | 2019, 2020, 2021 | |
| Beanpot MVP | 2020 | |
| All-Rookie Team | 2020 | |
| All-Tournament Team | 2020, 2022 | |
| All-Academic Team | 2021, 2022, 2023 | |
| Second Team All-Star | 2022, 2023 | |
International
| World Championship (Div IA) – Best Forward | 2022 | |
