= 2020–21 NCAA Division I women's ice hockey rankings =

- NCAA tournament: 2021
- Preseason No. 1 (USA Today): Wisconsin
- Preseason No. 1 (USCHO): Wisconsin
- NCAA Division I women's ice hockey rankings

Two polls make up the 2020–21 NCAA Division I women's ice hockey rankings, the USCHO.com poll and the USA Today/USA Hockey Magazine poll. As the 2020–21 season progressed, rankings were updated weekly.

== Legend ==
	Increase in ranking
	Decrease in ranking
	Not ranked previous week
Italics	Number of first place votes
(#-#)	Win–loss–tie record
т	Tied with team above or below also with this symbol

== USCHO ==
	Preseason Nov 9	Week 1 Nov 23	Week 2 Nov 30	Week 3 Dec 7	Week 4 Dec 14	Week 5	Week 6	Week 7	Week 8	Week 9	Week 10	Week 11	Week 12	Week 13	Week 14	Week 15	Week 16	Week 17	Week 18	Week 19	Week 20	Week 21	Final	
1.	Wisconsin (7)	Wisconsin (0–0–0) (11)	Wisconsin (1–1–0) (6)	Wisconsin (1–1–0) (9)	Wisconsin (1–1–0) (10)																			1.
2.	Cornell (7)	Northeastern (0–0–0) (4)	Northeastern (0–0–0) (6)	Northeastern (0–0–0) (3)	Minnesota (5–1–0) (4)																			2.
3.	Northeastern (1)	Minnesota (1–1–0)	Minnesota (3–1–0) (3)	Minnesota (3–1–0) (3)	Northeastern (1–1–0) (1)																			3.
4.	Minnesota	Ohio State (1–1–0)	Ohio State (2–2–0)	Ohio State (2–2–0)	Ohio State (2–2–0)																			4.
5.	Ohio State	Clarkson (0–0–0)	Colgate (3–0–0)	Colgate (4–1–0)	Colgate (4–1–1)																			5.
6.	Princeton	Minnesota Duluth (2–0–0)	Minnesota Duluth (2–2–0)	Minnesota Duluth (4–2–0)	Minnesota Duluth (4–2–0)																			6.
7.	Clarkson	Boston University (0–0–0) т	Clarkson (0–1–0)	Clarkson (1–2–0)	Providence (5–0–1)																			7.
8.	Minnesota Duluth	Boston College (2–0–0) т	Boston University (0–0–0)	Providence (5–0–1)	Boston College (5–3–0)																			8.
9.	Boston University	Colgate (2–0–0)	Providence (3–0–1)	Boston College (4–2–0)	Clarkson (1–2–1)																			9.
10.	Mercyhurst	Mercyhurst (0–0–0)	Boston College (2–2–0)	Boston University (1–1–0)	Mercyhurst (2–0–0)																			10.
	Preseason Nov 9	Week 1 Nov 23	Week 2 Nov 30	Week 3 Dec 7	Week 4 Dec 14	Week 5	Week 6	Week 7	Week 8	Week 9	Week 10	Week 11	Week 12	Week 13	Week 14	Week 15	Week 16	Week 17	Week 18	Week 19	Week 20	Week 21	Final	
		Dropped: Cornell; Princeton	Dropped: Mercyhurst	None	Dropped: Boston University	None	None	None	None	None	None	None	None	None	None	None	None	None	None	None	None	None	None	

== USA Today ==
	Preseason Nov 3	Week 1 Nov 24	Week 2 Dec 1	Week 3 Dec 8	Week 4 Dec 15	Week 5	Week 6	Week 7	Week 8	Week 9	Week 10	Week 11	Week 12	Week 13	Week 14	Week 15	Week 16	Week 17	Week 18	Week 19	Week 20	Week 21	Final	
1.	Wisconsin (9)	Wisconsin (0–0–0) (15)	Wisconsin (1–1–0) (9)	Wisconsin (1–1–0) (10)	Wisconsin (1–1–0) (15)																			1.
2.	Cornell (7)	Northeastern (0–0–0) (4)	Northeastern (0–0–0) (6)	Northeastern (0–0–0) (6)	Minnesota (3–1–0) (4)																			2.
3.	Northeastern (2)	Minnesota (1–1–0)	Minnesota (3–1–0) (4)	Minnesota (3–1–0) (3)	Ohio State (2–2–0)																			3.
4.	Minnesota (1)	Ohio State (1–1–0)	Ohio State (2–2–0)	Ohio State (2–2–0)	Northeastern (1–1–0)																			4.
5.	Ohio State	Clarkson (0–0–0)	Clarkson (0–1–0)	Colgate (4–1–0)	Colgate (4–1–1)																			5.
6.	Clarkson	Minnesota Duluth (2–0–0)	Colgate (3–0–0)	Minnesota Duluth (4–2–0)	Minnesota Duluth (4–2–0)																			6.
7.	Princeton	Boston University (0–0–0)	Minnesota Duluth (2–2–0)	Clarkson (1–2–1)	Providence (5–0–1)																			7.
8.	Minnesota Duluth	Boston College (2–0–0)	Boston University (0–0–0)	Providence (5–0–1)	Clarkson (1–2–1)																			8.
9.	Boston University	Colgate (2–0–0)	Providence (3–0–1)	Boston College (4–2–0)	Boston College (5–3–0)																			9.
10.	Mercyhurst	Mercyhurst (0–0–0)	Boston College (2–2–0)	Boston University (1–1–0)	Quinnipiac (1–0–0)																			10.
	Preseason Nov 3	Week 1 Nov 24	Week 2 Dec 1	Week 3 Dec 8	Week 4 Dec 15	Week 5	Week 6	Week 7	Week 8	Week 9	Week 10	Week 11	Week 12	Week 13	Week 14	Week 15	Week 16	Week 17	Week 18	Week 19	Week 20	Week 21	Final	
		Dropped: Cornell; Princeton	Dropped: Mercyhurst	None	Dropped: Boston University	None	None	None	None	None	None	None	None	None	None	None	None	None	None	None	None	None	None	
