= 2022 NCAA Division I women's ice hockey tournament =

NCAA women's ice hockey postseason tournament

2022 NCAA National Collegiate women's ice hockey tournament
- Teams: 11
- Finals site: Pegula Ice Arena, University Park, Pennsylvania
- Champions: Ohio State Buckeyes (1st title)
- Runner-up: Minnesota Duluth Bulldogs (7th title game)
- Semifinalists: Northeastern Huskies (2nd Frozen Four); Yale Bulldogs (1st Frozen Four)
- Winning coach: Nadine Muzerall (1st title)
- MOP: Paetyn Levis (Ohio State)
- Attendance: 3,671, 2,008 for Championship Game

The 2022 NCAA Division I women's ice hockey tournament was a single-elimination tournament by eleven schools to determine the national champion of women's NCAA Division I college ice hockey. This was the first year the tournament featured an expanded field of 11 teams. The first round and quarterfinals were played on at the campuses of seeded teams on March 10 and 12, 2022, while the Frozen Four was played on March 18 and 20, 2022 at Pegula Ice Arena in University Park, Pennsylvania. (Note: The arena is within the corporate limits of College Township, but "University Park" is the mailing address.) Yale made the NCAA tournament for the first time in program history and subsequently made the Frozen Four for the first time ever. Ohio State won the tournament with a 3–2 win over Minnesota-Duluth to win their first national championship. They became only the fifth different team to win the NCAA Division I women's ice hockey tournament.

== Qualifying teams ==
2022 Qualifying Teams
WCHA, ECAC, Hockey East, CHA

In the first year under this qualification format, the winners of all four Division I conference tournaments received automatic berths to the NCAA tournament. The other seven teams were selected at-large. The top five teams were then seeded.

Seed	School	Conference	Record	Berth type	Appearance	Last bid
1	Ohio State	WCHA	29–6–0	Tournament champion	4th	2021
2	Minnesota	WCHA	29–8–1	At-large bid	19th	2020
3	Northeastern	Hockey East	30–4–2	Tournament champion	6th	2021
4	Colgate	ECAC	30–7–1	Tournament champion	3rd	2021
5	Yale	ECAC	25–8–1	At-large bid	1st	Never
	Wisconsin	WCHA	25–7–1	At-large bid	16th	2021
	Minnesota-Duluth	WCHA	24–11–1	At-large bid	13th	2021
	Clarkson	ECAC	22–11–3	At-large bid	10th	2020
	Syracuse	CHA	15–10–6	Tournament champion	2nd	2019
	Quinnipiac	ECAC	25–9–3	At-large bid	3rd	2016
	Harvard	ECAC	22–9–1	At-large bid	12th	2015

== Bracket ==
First round March 10; BigTen+, CollegeSportsLive
Quinnipiac	4
Syracuse	0
Minnesota Duluth	4
Harvard	0
Wisconsin	3
Clarkson	1

National quarterfinals March 12; BigTen+, CollegeSportsLive, ESPN+
1	Ohio State	4**
Quinnipiac	3
4	Colgate	1
5	Yale	2*
2	Minnesota	1
Minnesota Duluth	2
3	Northeastern	4
Wisconsin	2

National semifinals March 18; ESPN+
1	Ohio State	2
5	Yale	1
Minnesota Duluth	2**
3	Northeastern	1

National championship March 20; ESPN+
1	Ohio State	3
Minnesota Duluth	2

Note: each * denotes one overtime period

== Results ==
=== First Round ===
==== Quinnipiac vs. Syracuse ====
March 10; 6:00 pm	Syracuse	0–4 (0–0, 0–2, 0–2)	Quinnipiac	Ohio State University Ice Rink; Attendance: 230

Game reference

Arielle DeSmet
Goalies
Corinne Schroeder
Referees:
Robert Ludwig
Michael Kaehler
Linesmen:
Aaron Neville
Glendon Seal

0–1	31:26 – House (Naud)
0–2	35:59 – Peart (Vorster, Hoskin)
0–3	42:15 – Schryver (Boyd, Adzija)
0–4	59:47 – en – Adzija (Boyd)

6 min
Penalties
6 min
16
Shots
30

==== Wisconsin vs. Clarkson ====
March 10; 7:00 pm	Clarkson	1–3 (0–1, 0–1, 1–1)	Wisconsin	Matthews Arena; Attendance: 288

Game reference

Amanda Zeglen
Goalies
Kennedy Blair
Referees:
Chelsea Rapin
Kelly Cooke
Linesmen:
Evan Cooke
Steven Saul

	0–1	17:50 – Wheeler (Webster, Pettet)
	0–2	30:18 – Watts (LaMantia, Edwards)
Gosling – (Lessard, David) – 57:59	1–2
	1–3	59:42 – en – Drake (Bowlby)

10 min
Penalties
16 min
31
Shots
25

==== Minnesota Duluth vs. Harvard ====
March 10; 6:00 pm	Harvard	0–4 (0–1, 0–2, 0–1)	Minnesota Duluth	Ridder Arena; Attendance: 732

Game reference

Becky Dutton
Goalies
Emma Söderberg
Referees:
Todd Plouffe
Garrett Gaydoash
Linesmen:
Brian Kimmins
James Rogowsky

0–1	0:39 – Hughes (Giguère, Klein)
0–2	20:25 – Hughes (Klein, Giguère)
0–3	32:21 – Hughes (Giguère)
0–4	46:34 – Hewett – (Linser, Stewart)

0 min
Penalties
2 min
27
Shots
30

=== National Quarterfinals ===
==== Wisconsin vs. (3) Northeastern ====
March 12; 1:00 pm	Wisconsin	2–4 (1–2, 0–1, 1–1)	Northeastern	Matthews Arena; Attendance: 1,019

Game reference

Blair Kennedy
Goalies
Aerin Frankel
Referees:
Chelsea Rapin
Kelly Cooke
Linesmen:
Evan Cooke
Steven Saul

	0–1	4:17 – pp – Knoll (Renner, Hobson)
O'Brien (Webster, LaMantia) – 9:30	1–1
	1–2	19:55 – Irving – (Knoll, Mills)
	1–3	31:22 – Murphy – (Aurard, Hobson)
Pettet (Shirley, Bowlby) – pp – 43:35	2–3
	2–4	48:57 – pp – Müller – (Murphy, Mills)

8 min
Penalties
8 min
41
Shots
32

==== (5) Yale vs. (4) Colgate ====
March 12; 3:00 pm	Yale	2–1 OT (1–1, 0–0, 0–0); OT: (1–0)	Colgate	Class of 1965 Arena; Attendance: 795

Game reference

Gianna Meloni
Goalies
Hannah Murphy
Referees:
Katie Guay
Tom Lynch
Linesmen:
Coby Munson
Jenny Cameron

Poniatovskaia (Hartje, Vanstone) – 8:25	1–0
	1–1	18:41 – O'Donohoe (Greig, Simpson)
Dettling (DeCorby) – 62:05	2–1

4 min
Penalties
2 min
22
Shots
29

==== Minnesota Duluth vs. (2) Minnesota ====
March 12; 2:00 pm	Minnesota Duluth	2–1 (0–1, 1–0, 1–0)	Minnesota	Ridder Arena; Attendance: 1,447

Game reference

Emma Söderberg
Goalies
Lauren Bench
Referees:
Tyler Olson
Duncan Ryhorchuk
Linesmen:
Brian Jensen
Mike Mueller

	0–1	9:50 – Boreen – (Skaja, Potomak)
McMahon (Van Wieren) – 14:46	1–1
Hughes (Giguère)– 14:36	2–1

4 min
Penalties
2 min
27
Shots
38

==== Quinnipiac vs. (1) Ohio State ====
March 12; 5:00 pm	Quinnipiac	3–4 2OT (1–1, 1–1, 1–1); OT: (0–0, 0–1)	Ohio State	Ohio State University Ice Rink; Attendance: 778

Game reference

Corinne Schroeder
Goalies
Amanda Thiele
Referees:
Robert Ludwig
Michael Kaehler
Linesmen:
Aaron Neville
Glendon Seal

Naud – 8:26	1–0
	1–1	19:03 – pp – Brengman
	1–2	24:30 – pp – DeGeorge (Jaques, Bizal)
Labad (Peart) – 26:56	2–2
	2–3	42:19 – Jaques (Schepers)
House (Cooper, Mobley) – pp – 58:38	3–3
	3–4	62:05 – DeGeorge (Schepers, Brengman)

8 min
Penalties
6 min
22
Shots
77

=== National semifinals ===
==== Minnesota Duluth vs. (3) Northeastern ====
March 18; 3:30 pm	Northeastern	1–2 2OT (0–0, 1–0, 0–1); OT: (0–0, 0–1)	Minnesota Duluth	Pegula Ice Arena

Game reference

Aerin Frankel
Goalies
Emma Söderberg
Referees:
Katie Guay
Derek Zuckerman
Linesmen:
Jenny Cameron
Coby Munson

Irving – (Knoll, Mills) – 24:35	1–0
	1–1	50:05 – Anderson – (Hewett, Rogge)
	1–2	98:15 – Rogge – (Giguère)

0 min
Penalties
2 min
47
Shots
50

==== (5) Yale vs. (1) Ohio State ====
March 18; 8:13 pm	Yale	1–2 (0–0, 1–2, 0–0)	Ohio State	Pegula Ice Arena; Attendance: 1,663

Game reference

Gianna Meloni
Goalies
Amanda Thiele
Referees:
Chelsea Rapin
Kelly Cooke
Linesmen:
Evan Cooke
Steven Saul

	0–1	7:08 – pp – Levis – (Schepers, Brengman)
	0–2	10:57 – Gardiner – (Brengman)
Botthof – (Harvey, Lee) – 22:43	1–2

4 min
Penalties
4 min
24
Shots
38

=== National championship ===
==== Minnesota Duluth vs. (1) Ohio State ====
March 20; 4:00 pm	Minnesota Duluth	2–3 (0–0, 1–1, 1–2)	Ohio State	Pegula Ice Arena; Attendance: 2,008

Game reference

Emma Söderberg
Goalies
Amanda Thiele
Referees:
Robert Ludwig
Mike Kaehler
Linesmen:
Aaron Neville
Glendon Seal

	0–1	24:10 – pp – Levis (DeGeorge)
Rogge (Skinner, Anderson) – 32:42	1–1
	1–2	40:24 – DeGeorge – (Levis)
Giguère – (Klein) – 41:47	2–2
	2–3	53:20 – Hauswirth

2 min
Penalties
0 min
19
Shots
39

== Media ==
=== Television ===
ESPN had US television rights to the semifinals and national championship after entering into a multi-year contract to carry the event. The Quarterfinals were streamed on ESPN+, CollegeSportsLive, and BigTen+. ESPN+ carried the Frozen Four and the Championship, while ESPNU also carried the Championship.

==== Broadcast assignments ====
Women's Frozen Four and Championship

- Clay Matvick, AJ Mleczko, and Hilary Knight.

== Tournament awards ==
=== All-Tournament Team ===
- G: Emma Söderberg, Minnesota Duluth
- D: Sophie Jaques, Ohio State
- D: Skylar Fontaine, Northeastern
- F: Kenzie Hauswirth, Ohio State
- F: Paetyn Levis*, Ohio State
- F: Naomi Rogge, Minnesota Duluth

* Most Outstanding Player

== See also ==
- 2022 NCAA Division I men's ice hockey tournament
