= 2020–21 Minnesota Golden Gophers women's ice hockey season =

- Conference: WCHA

Rankings
- USCHO.com: 6

Record
- Overall: 11–8–1
- Conference: 11–7–1
- Home: 4–5–1
- Road: 7–3–0

Coaches and captains
- Head coach: Brad Frost (14th season)
- Assistant coaches: Joel Johnson; Bethany Brausen
- Captain(s): Emily Brown; Grace Zumwinkle

The 2020–21 Minnesota Golden Gophers women's ice hockey season was the team's 24th season of play for the program. They represented the University of Minnesota in WCHA women's ice hockey during the 2020–21 NCAA Division I women's ice hockey season. They were coached by Brad Frost in his 14th season. The Golden Gophers did not qualify for the NCAA tournament for the first time since 2007, snapping its streak of 12 consecutive tournament appearances. Among the season highlights, Grace Zumwinkle was recognized as a Second-Team All-America selection.

In the aftermath of the Frozen Four, it was announced that the Golden Gophers were invited to participate in the Smashville NCAA Women's Hockey Showcase in November at the Ford Ice Center, practice facility of the NHL's Nashville Predators. Also participating in the tournament were Division I women's hockey programs Boston College, Colgate and Mercyhurst.

== Offseason ==
=== Recruiting ===
| Player | Position | Nationality | Notes |
|---|---|---|---|
| Anne Cherkowski | Forward | Canada | Competed with Canadian National Under-18 Team, serving as an alternate captain for the silver medal roster at the 2020 IIHF World Women's U18 Championship |

=== Roster ===
| No. | Nat. | Player | Class | Pos | Height | DoB | Hometown | Previous team |
|---|---|---|---|---|---|---|---|---|
| 1 | | Olivia King | Sophomore | F | 5' 6" (1.68 m) | 2001-01-05 | Garrison, Minnesota | Brainerd High School |
| 2 | | Emily Brown | Freshman | D | 5' 7" (1.7 m) | 1998-12-30 | Blaine, Minnesota | Blaine High School |
| 3 | | Catie Skaja | Junior | F | 5' 7" (1.7 m) | 1999-06-28 | New Prague, Minnesota | New Prague High School |
| 4 | | Audrey Wethington | Freshman | F | 5' 7" (1.7 m) | 2002-04-01 | Edina, Minnesota | Blake School |
| 5 | | Madeline Wethington | Sophomore | D | 5' 10" (1.78 m) | 2000-07-14 | Edina, Minnesota | Blake School |
| 6 | | Gracie Ostertag | Junior | D | 5' 7" (1.7 m) | 2000-02-14 | Shakopee, Minnesota | Shattuck-Saint Mary's |
| 7 | | Sydney Shearen | Sophomore | F | 5' 4" (1.63 m) | 2001-08-02 | Hugo, Minnesota | White Bear Lake High School |
| 9 | | Taylor Heise | Junior | F | 5' 10" (1.78 m) | 2000-03-17 | Lake City, Minnesota | Red Wing High School |
| 11 | | Anne Cherkowski | Freshman | F | 5' 6" (1.68 m) | 2002-07-06 | Coldstream, British Columbia | George Eliot Secondary |
| 12 | | Grace Zumwinkle | Senior | F | 5' 9" (1.75 m) | 1999-04-23 | Excelsior, Minnesota | Breck School |
| 13 | | Crystalyn Hengler | Junior | D | 5' 8" (1.73 m) | 1999-09-11 | Eden Prairie, Minnesota | Eden Prairie High School |
| 14 | | Maggie Nicholson | Freshman | D | 5' 9" (1.75 m) | 2002-03-21 | Minnetonka, Minnesota | Minnetonka High School |
| 16 | | Amy Potomak | Junior | F | 5' 6" (1.68 m) | 1999-06-25 | Aldergrove, British Columbia | George Eliot Secondary |
| 17 | | Josey Dunne | Freshman | D | 5' 10" (1.78 m) | 2002-02-11 | O'Fallon, Missouri | Heritage Christian Academy |
| 18 | | Abbey Murphy | Freshman | F | 5' 5" (1.65 m) | 2002-04-14 | Evergreen Park, Illinois | Mother McAuley High School |
| 19 | | Tella Jungels | Freshman | F | 5' 4" (1.63 m) | 2002-01-30 | Edina, Minnesota | Edina High School |
| 21 | | Emily Oden | Junior | F | 5' 8" (1.73 m) | 1999-11-14 | Edina, Minnesota | Edina High School |
| 22 | | Abigail Boreen | Junior | F | 5' 6" (1.68 m) | 2000-04-03 | Somerset, Wisconsin | Hill-Murray School |
| 24 | | Olivia Knowles | Senior | D | 5' 9" (1.75 m) | 1999-01-24 | Campbell River, British Columbia | Penticton Secondary School |
| 26 | | Addie Burton | Freshman | F | 5' 10" (1.78 m) | 2001-11-30 | Orono, Minnesota | Blake School |
| 28 | | Taylor Wente | Senior | F | 5' 6" (1.68 m) | 1999-04-01 | Plymouth, Minnesota | Maple Grove High School |
| 33 | | Makayla Pahl | Sophomore | G | 5' 11" (1.8 m) | 2001-07-28 | Rochester, Minnesota | Mayo High School |
| 35 | | Lauren Bench | Senior | G | 5' 10" (1.78 m) | 1997-11-21 | Eagan, Minnesota | Bemidji State Beavers (WCHA) |

== Regular season ==
=== Standings ===
2020–21 Western Collegiate Hockey Association standings
| | Conference | | | | | | | | Overall | | | | | |
| | GP | W | L | T | SW | PTS | GF | GA | GP | W | L | T | GF | GA |
|---|---|---|---|---|---|---|---|---|---|---|---|---|---|---|
| #1 Wisconsin † * | 16 | 12 | 3 | 1 | 0 | 36 | 62 | 25 | 21 | 17 | 3 | 1 | 79 | 33 |
| #4 Minnesota Duluth | 16 | 11 | 5 | 0 | 0 | 34 | 50 | 23 | 23 | 12 | 7 | 0 | 55 | 33 |
| #3 Ohio State | 16 | 11 | 5 | 0 | 0 | 32 | 42 | 32 | 20 | 13 | 7 | 0 | 56 | 42 |
| #6 Minnesota | 19 | 11 | 7 | 0 | 1 | 36 | 62 | 40 | 20 | 11 | 8 | 1 | 65 | 45 |
| Minnesota State | 20 | 7 | 12 | 1 | 0 | 20 | 38 | 56 | 20 | 7 | 12 | 1 | 38 | 56 |
| St. Cloud State | 19 | 6 | 12 | 1 | 0 | 18.5 | 32 | 62 | 19 | 6 | 12 | 1 | 32 | 62 |
| Bemidji State | 20 | 2 | 16 | 2 | 1 | 12.5 | 24 | 72 | 20 | 2 | 16 | 2 | 24 | 72 |
Championship: March 8, 2021 † indicates conference regular season champion; * indicates conference tournament champion Rankings: USCHO.com; updated March 25, 2021

=== Schedule ===
| Date | Opponent^{#} | Rank^{#} | Site | Decision | Result | Record |
Regular Season
| Nov 21 | #5 Ohio State | #4 | Ridder Arena • Minneapolis, MN | Bench | W 4–0 | 1–0–0 (1–0–0) |
| Nov 22 | #5 Ohio State | #4 | Ridder Arena • Minneapolis, MN | Bench | L 1–2 | 1–1–0 (1–1–0) |
| Nov 27 | #6 Minnesota Duluth | #3 | AMSOIL Arena • Duluth, MN | Bench | W 4–2 | 2–1–0 (2–1–0) |
| Nov 28 | #6 Minnesota Duluth | #3 | AMSOIL Arena • Duluth, MN | Bench | W 2–1 | 3–1–0 (3–1–0) |
| Dec 10 | at Minnesota State | #3 | Mayo Clinic Health System Event Center • Mankato, MN | Bench | W 5–1 | 4–1–0 (4–1–0) |
| Dec 11 | Minnesota State | #3 | Ridder Arena • Minneapolis, MN | Pahl | W 2–1 | 5–1–0 (5–1–0) |
| Jan 7 | St. Cloud State | #2 | Ridder Arena • Minneapolis, MN | Bench | W 2–1 | 6–1–0 (6–1–0) |
| Jan 9 | St. Cloud State | #2 | Ridder Arena • Minneapolis, MN | Pahl | W 4–1 | 7–1–0 (7–1–0) |
| Jan 10 | at St. Cloud State | #2 | Herb Brooks National Hockey Center • St. Cloud, MN | Bench | W 4–0 | 8–1–0 (8–1–0) |
| Jan 15 | at #2 Wisconsin | #1 | LaBahn Arena • Madison, WI | Bench | L 0–5 | 8–2–0 (8–2–0) |
| Jan 16 | at #2 Wisconsin | #1 | LaBahn Arena • Madison, WI | Bench | L 3–6 | 8–3–0 (8–3–0) |
| Jan 29 | at #3 Ohio State | #2 | Ohio State University Ice Rink • Columbus, OH | Bench | W 7–4 | 9–3–0 (9–3–0) |
| Jan 30 | at #3 Ohio State | #2 | Ohio State University Ice Rink • Columbus, OH | Pahl | L 1–3 | 9–4–0 (9–4–0) |
| Feb 5 | #1 Wisconsin | #2 | Ridder Arena • Minneapolis, MN | Bench | L 3–4 ^{OT} | 9–5–0 (9–5–0) |
| Feb 6 | #1 Wisconsin | #2 | Ridder Arena • Minneapolis, MN | Pahl | T 2–2 ^{OT} | 9–5–1 (9–5–1) |
| Feb 12 | #4 Ohio State | #2 | Ridder Arena • Minneapolis, MN | Pahl | L 1–2 | 9–6–1 (9–6–1) |
| Feb 13 | #4 Ohio State | #2 | Ridder Arena • Minneapolis, MN | Bench | L 2–3 | 9–7–1 (9–7–1) |
| Feb 19 | at Bemidji State | #4 | Sanford Center • Bemidji, MN | Bench | W 6–1 | 10–7–1 (10–7–1) |
| Feb 20 | at Bemidji State | #4 | Sanford Center • Bemidji, MN | Pahl | W 9–1 | 11–7–1 (11–7–1) |
WCHA Tournament
| Mar 6 | #1 Wisconsin | #4 | Ridder Arena • Minneapolis, MN | Pahl | L 3–5 | 11–8–1 (11–8–1) |
*Non-conference game. ^{#}Rankings from USCHO.com Poll.

== Awards and honors ==
- Lauren Bench, Hockey Commissioners Association Women's Goaltender of the Month (November 2020)
- Grace Zumwinkle, 2020–21 CCM/AHCA Second Team All-American
