= 2020–21 Ohio State Buckeyes women's ice hockey season =

Frozen Four, L, 2-3 vs Wisconsin Badgers
- Conference: WCHA

Record
- Overall: 13-7-0

Coaches and captains
- Head coach: Nadine Muzerall
- Assistant coaches: Emily West; Zoe Hickel
- Captain(s): Emma Maltais; Liz Schepers
- Alternate captain(s): Lisa Bruno; Tatum Skaggs

The Ohio State Buckeyes women's ice hockey program represent the Ohio State University during the 2020-21 NCAA Division I women's ice hockey season. The program qualified for the 2021 NCAA National Collegiate Women's Ice Hockey Tournament, ranked as the #3 seed.

== Offseason ==
=== Recruiting ===
Player	Position	Nationality	Notes
Jenna Buglioni	Forward	Canada	Named to Tournament All-Star Team at the 2020 IIHF U18 Women's World Championships

== Roster ==
=== 2020–21 Buckeyes ===
No.	Nat.	Player	Class	Pos	Height	DoB	Hometown	Previous team
4		Ramsey Parent	Freshman	F	5' 6" (1.68 m)			Blaine, Minnesota	Blaine Bengals	—
7		Eve Savander	Junior	D	5' 6" (1.68 m)			Joensuu, Finland	Team Kuortane	—
8		Brooke Bink	Sophomore	F	5' 5" (1.65 m)			Escanaba, Michigan	Shattuck Saint Mary's	—
9		Madison Bizal	Junior	D	5' 4" (1.63 m)			Elk River, Minnesota	Elk River High School	—
10		Jenna Buglioni	Freshman	F	5' 3" (1.6 m)			Port Moody, British Columbia	Greater Vancouver Comets	—
11		Tatum Skaggs (A)	Senior	F	5' 6" (1.68 m)			Hartland, Wisconsin	Chicago Mission	—
12		Jennifer Gardiner	Sophomore	F	5' 6" (1.68 m)			Surrey, British Columbia	Greater Vancouver Comets	—
13		Riley Brengman	Freshman	D	5' 5" (1.65 m)			China, Michigan	Belle Tire	—
15		Gabby Rosenthal	Junior	F	5' 7" (1.7 m)			Blaine, Minnesota	Blaine High School	—
17		Emma Maltais (C)	Senior	F	5' 4" (1.63 m)			Burlington, Ontario	Oakville Hornets	—
18		Sophie Jaques	Junior	D	5' 8" (1.73 m)			Toronto, Ontario	Toronto Aeros	—
19		Shani Rossignol	Freshman	F	5' 2" (1.57 m)			Notre Dame de Lourdes, New Brunswick	Team Atlantic	—
20		Andrea Braendli	Junior	G	5' 6" (1.68 m)			Zurich, Switzerland	EHC Schaffhausen	—
21		Liz Schepers (C)	Senior	F	5' 7" (1.7 m)			Mound, Minnesota	Mound Westonka	—
22		Lisa Bruno (A)	Senior	D	5' 5" (1.65 m)			Whitby, Ontario	Durham Lightning	—
25		Sara Säkkinen	Junior	F	5' 4" (1.63 m)			Pirkkala, Finland	Team Kuortane	—
26		Teghan Inglis	Sophomore	D	5' 9" (1.75 m)			Okotoks, Alberta	Pursuit of Excellence Academy	—
27		Paetyn Levis	Junior	F	5' 5" (1.65 m)			Rogers, Minnesota	Rogers High School	—
30		Lynsey Wallace	Senior	G	5' 8" (1.73 m)			Seven Hills, Ohio	Gilmour Academy	—
32		Amanda Thiele	Freshman	G	5' 10" (1.78 m)			Milford, Michigan	Belle Tire	—
35		Quinn Kuntz	Sophomore	G	5' 7" (1.7 m)			Warroad, Minnesota	Polar Xpress	—

== Regular season ==
=== Standings ===
2020–21 Western Collegiate Hockey Association standings
	Conference								Overall					
	GP	W	L	T	SW	PTS	GF	GA	GP	W	L	T	GF	GA
#1 Wisconsin † *	16	12	3	1	0	36	62	25	21	17	3	1	79	33
#4 Minnesota Duluth	16	11	5	0	0	34	50	23	23	12	7	0	55	33
#3 Ohio State	16	11	5	0	0	32	42	32	20	13	7	0	56	42
#6 Minnesota	19	11	7	0	1	36	62	40	20	11	8	1	65	45
Minnesota State	20	7	12	1	0	20	38	56	20	7	12	1	38	56
St. Cloud State	19	6	12	1	0	18.5	32	62	19	6	12	1	32	62
Bemidji State	20	2	16	2	1	12.5	24	72	20	2	16	2	24	72
Championship: March 8, 2021 † indicates conference regular season champion; * indicates conference tournament champion Rankings: USCHO.com; updated March 25, 2021

=== Schedule ===
Date	Opponent^{#}	Rank^{#}	Site	Decision	Result	Record
Regular Season
January 15	Minnesota Duluth Bulldogs		Amsoil Arena • Duluth, MN	L 0-2		
January 16	Minnesota Duluth Bulldogs		Amsoil Arena • Duluth, MN	W 1-0		
*Non-conference game. ^{#}Rankings from USCHO.com Poll.

== Awards and honors ==
- Andrea Braendli, Finalist for the Hockey Commissioners Association’s Women’s Hockey Goalie of the Year Award
- Emma Maltais, All-USCHO.com Third Team
