= 2017 IIHF U18 Women's World Championship =

Tournament details
- Host country: Czech Republic
- Venue(s): PSG Aréna Zlín, Zimní stadion Přerov (in 2 host cities)
- Dates: 7–14 January 2017
- Teams: 8

Final positions
- Champions: United States (6th title)
- Runners-up: Canada
- Third place: Russia
- Fourth place: Sweden

Tournament statistics
- Games played: 21
- Goals scored: 88 (4.19 per game)
- Attendance: 11,919 (568 per game)
- Scoring leader: (Switzerland) Lisa Rüedi (6 points)

The 2017 IIHF U18 Women's World Championship was the tenth IIHF U18 Women's World Championship in ice hockey. The tournament was played in Přerov and Zlín, Czech Republic. For the third straight year the United States for the gold and winning their sixth title overall, after defeated Canada in the game. Russia defeated Sweden for the bronze, reversing the outcome of the previous year.

== Top Division ==
=== Preliminary round ===
==== Group A ====
Pos	Team	Pld	W	OTW	OTL	L	GF	GA	GD	Pts	Qualification
1	Canada	3	2	1	0	0	10	3	+7	8	Advance to semifinals
2	United States	3	2	0	1	0	10	2	+8	7	Advance to semifinals
3	Russia	3	0	1	0	2	5	11	−6	2	Advance to quarterfinals
4	Sweden	3	0	0	1	2	2	11	−9	1	Advance to quarterfinals

Source: IIHF
Rules for classification: 1) points; 2) head-to-head points; 3) head-to-head goal difference; 4) head-to-head number of goals scored; 5) result against closest best-ranked team outside tied teams; 6) result against second-best ranked team outside tied teams; 7) seeding before tournament.

7 January 2017; 15:30	United States	6–1 (2–0, 2–0, 2–1)	Russia	PSG Arena, Zlín; Attendance: 264

Game reference

Alex Gukstene
Goalies
Diana Farkhutdinova
Valeria Merkusheva
Referee:
(Finland) Henna Aberg
Linesmen:
(Switzerland) Magali Anex
(Canada) Stephanie Gagnon

Murphy (DeGeorge, Drake) – 08:14	1–0
Heising (Linser) – 08:48	2–0
Barnes (Wente) – 20:55	3–0
Wente (Skaja) – 31:43	4–0
Barnes (Heising, Wethington) (PP) – 47:21	5–0
Linser (Ostertag) – 51:06	6–0
	6–1	59:34 – Beloglazova (Shirokova)

4 min
Penalties
10 min
39
Shots
15

7 January 2017; 19:30	Canada	5–1 (0–1, 3–0, 2–0)	Sweden	PSG arena, Zlín; Attendance: 239

Game reference

Danika Ranger
Goalies
Anna Amholt
Referee:
(Czech Republic) Radka Ruzickova
Linesmen:
(United States) Jamie Fenstermacher
(Czech Republic) Zuzana Svobodova

	0–1	03:18 – Olsson (Ljungblom)
Bell (Vasko) – 25:12	1–1
Buckles (Shirley) – 29:59	2–1
Maltais (Knowles, Buckles) (PP) – 37:46	3–1
Knowles (James-Mitchell) – 40:17	4–1
Watts (Maltais) – 51:42	5–1

6 min
Penalties
10 min
33
Shots
17

8 January 2017; 15:30	Canada	4–2 (1–0, 1–2, 2–0)	Russia	PSG arena, Zlín; Attendance: 233

Game reference

Edith D'Astous-Moreau
Goalies
Valeria Merkusheva
Referee:
(United States) Samantha Hiller
Linesmen:
(Sweden) Liv Andersson
(Finland) Jenni Heikkinen

Vasko (Beres) – 08:25	1–0
	1–1	24:19 – Bratisheva (Orlova)
	1–2	28:10 – Starovoitova (Shatalova)
Veillette, (David) – 28:48	2–2
Potomak (Shirley) (PP) – 45:44	3–2
Pettet (Shirley, Potomak) – 52:29	4–2

4 min
Penalties
4 min
45
Shots
14

8 January 2017; 19:30	Sweden	0–4 (0–1, 0–3, 0–0)	United States	PSG arena, Zlín; Attendance: 176

Game reference

Sofia Reideborn
Goalies
Lindsay Reed
Referee:
(Canada) Lacey Senuk
Linesmen:
(Switzerland) Magali Anex
(France) Charlotte Girard

0–1	13:12 – Drake (Petrie)
0–2	29:51 – Linser (Compher, Heising)
0–3	30:44 – Barnes (Zumwinkle, Oden) (PP)
0–4	37:23 – Heising (Barnes)

8 min
Penalties
4 min
23
Shots
61

10 January 2016; 15:30	United States	0–1 OT (0–0, 0–0, 0–0) (OT: 0–1)	Canada	PSG arena, Zlín; Attendance: 486

Game reference
Alex Gulstene	Goalies	Danika Ranger	Referee: (Sweden) Katerina Timglas; Linesmen: (France) Charlotte Girard (Czech Republic) Zuzanna Svobodova
0–1 / 61:57 – Bell			Referee: (Sweden) Katerina Timglas; Linesmen: (France) Charlotte Girard (Czech Republic) Zuzanna Svobodova
8 min	Penalties	8 min	Referee: (Sweden) Katerina Timglas; Linesmen: (France) Charlotte Girard (Czech Republic) Zuzanna Svobodova
23	Shots	30	Referee: (Sweden) Katerina Timglas; Linesmen: (France) Charlotte Girard (Czech Republic) Zuzanna Svobodova

10 January 2017; 19:30	Russia	2–1 GWS (0–0, 0–0, 1–1) (OT: 0–0) (SO: 1–0)	Sweden	PSG arena, Zlín; Attendance: 191

Game reference
Valeria Merkusheva	Goalies	Sofia Reideborn	Referee: (United States) Samantha Hiller; Linesmen: (Switzerland) Magali Anex (United States) Jamie Fenstermacher
/ 0–1 / 57:15 – Lundin (Bouveng, Bergstrom); Pirogova (Starovoitova) – 58:10 / 1–1			Referee: (United States) Samantha Hiller; Linesmen: (Switzerland) Magali Anex (United States) Jamie Fenstermacher
Bolgareva (miss); Starovoitova (miss); Pirogova (miss); Bratisheva	Shootout	(miss) Olsson; (miss) Ljungblom; (miss) Tedenby; (miss) Wikner-Zienkiewicz	Referee: (United States) Samantha Hiller; Linesmen: (Switzerland) Magali Anex (United States) Jamie Fenstermacher
14 min	Penalties	10 min	Referee: (United States) Samantha Hiller; Linesmen: (Switzerland) Magali Anex (United States) Jamie Fenstermacher
41	Shots	30	Referee: (United States) Samantha Hiller; Linesmen: (Switzerland) Magali Anex (United States) Jamie Fenstermacher

==== Group B ====
Pos	Team	Pld	W	OTW	OTL	L	GF	GA	GD	Pts	Qualification
1	Finland	3	2	0	1	0	7	4	+3	7	Advance to quarterfinals
2	Czech Republic (H)	3	1	1	1	0	8	7	+1	6	Advance to quarterfinals
3	Switzerland	3	1	1	0	1	6	6	0	5	Advance to relegation round
4	Japan	3	0	0	0	3	3	7	−4	0	Advance to relegation round

Source: IIHF
Rules for classification: 1) points; 2) head-to-head points; 3) head-to-head goal difference; 4) head-to-head number of goals scored; 5) result against closest best-ranked team outside tied teams; 6) result against second-best ranked team outside tied teams; 7) seeding before tournament.
(H) Host

7 January 2017; 16:15	Czech Republic	3–2 (1–0, 0–2, 2–0)	Japan	Zimní stadion Přerov, Přerov; Attendance: 1,825

Game reference

Kristýna Bláhová
Goalies
Ayu Tonosaki
Referee:
(Canada) Lacey Senuk
Linesmen:
(Sweden) Liv Andersson
(Slovakia) Magdalena Cerhitova

Erbenová (Vozdecká, Mlýnková) – 19:50	1–0
	1–1	31:02 – A. Sato (Koyama)
	1–2	39:19 – Yamashita (Suzuki, Tsutsumi) (PP2)
Kaltounková (Lerchová, Exnerová) – 42:09	2–2
Mlýnková (Machalová) – 50:22	3–2

4 min
Penalties
2 min
22
Shots
25

7 January 2017; 20:15	Finland	3–1 (2–0, 1–1, 0–0)	Switzerland	Zimní stadion Přerov, Přerov; Attendance: 148

Game reference

Jenna Silvonen
Goalies
Saskia Maurer
Referee:
(Sweden) Katarina Timglas
Linesmen:
(France) Charlotte Girard
(Sweden) Jessica Lundgren

Nylund (Aro) (PP) – 07:34	1–0
Nylund (Vesa, Melotindos) – 18:19	2–0
	2–1	24:29 – Enzler
Melotindos (Vesa) – 26:59	3–1

4 min
Penalties
8 min
43
Shots
17

8 January 2017; 16:15	Switzerland	3–2 GWS (2–0, 0–1, 0–1) (OT: 0–0) (SO: 1–0)	Czech Republic	Zimní stadion Přerov, Přerov; Attendance: 2,230

Game reference

Saskia Maurer
Goalies
Kristýna Bláhová
Referee:
(Russia) Yana Zueva
Linesmen:
(Slovakia) Magdalena Cerhitova
(Sweden) Jessica Lundgren

Ryhner (Sigrist) – 02:32	1–0
Rüedi (Ryhner, Vallario) – 15:38	2–0
	2–1	38:58 – Cornová (Škrdlová, Neubauerová) (PP)
	2–2	51:37 – Erbanová

Christen (miss)
Rüedi
Shootout
(miss) Mlýnková
(miss) Hymlárová
(miss) Neubauerová
10 min
Penalties
4 min
15
Shots
46

8 January 2017; 20:15	Finland	2–0 (0–0, 1–0, 1–0)	Japan	Zimní stadion Přerov, Přerov; Attendance: 115

Game reference
Jenna Silvonen	Goalies	Ayu Tonosaki	Referee: (Czech Republic) Radka Ruzickova; Linesmen: (Canada) Stephanie Gagnon (Czech Republic) Zuzana Svobodova
Nieminen (Kahra, Nousiainen) – 20:31 / 1–0; Nieminen – 46:36 / 2–0			Referee: (Czech Republic) Radka Ruzickova; Linesmen: (Canada) Stephanie Gagnon (Czech Republic) Zuzana Svobodova
6 min	Penalties	6 min	Referee: (Czech Republic) Radka Ruzickova; Linesmen: (Canada) Stephanie Gagnon (Czech Republic) Zuzana Svobodova
27	Shots	21	Referee: (Czech Republic) Radka Ruzickova; Linesmen: (Canada) Stephanie Gagnon (Czech Republic) Zuzana Svobodova

10 January 2017; 16:15	Czech Republic	3–2 OT (0–0, 1–0, 1–2) (OT: 1–0)	Finland	Zimní stadion Přerov, Přerov; Attendance: 1,584

Game reference

Kristýna Bláhová
Goalies
Sanni Ahola
Referee:
(Russia) Yana Zueva
Linesmen:
(Sweden) Liv Andersson
(Canada) Stephanie Gagnon

Mlýnková (Hymlárová, Erbanová) (PP2) – 23:04	1–0
	1–1	46:22 – Nousiainen (Nieminen)
	1–2	50:17 – Nylund (Allinen, Laitinen) (PP)
Kaltounková (Neubauerová) – 57:16	2–2
Erbanová (PP2) – 61:02	3–2

18 min
Penalties
24 min
33
Shots
26

10 January, 2017; 20:15	Japan	1–2 (0–0, 1–1, 0–1)	Switzerland	Zimní stadion Přerov, Přerov; Attendance: 103

Game reference

Mei Sato
Goalies
Saskia Maurer
Referee:
(Finland) Henna Aberg
Linesmen:
(Slovakia) Magdalena Cerhitova
(Finland) Jenni Heikkinen

	0–1	21:44 – Zimmermann
Tsutsumi (A. Sato, Yamamoto) – 25:35	1–1
	1–2	40:26 – Ryhner (Rüedi, Sigrist) (PP)

2 min
Penalties
8 min
25
Shots
18

== Relegation series ==
The third and fourth placed team from Group B played a best-of-three series to determine the relegated team, Japan was relegated

11 January 2017; 20:15	Switzerland	5–2 (1–1, 2–0, 2–1)	Japan	Zimní stadion Přerov; Attendance: 98

Game reference

Saskia Maurer
Goalies
Ayu Tonosaki
Mei Sato
Referee:
(Czech Republic) Radka Ruzickova
Linesmen:
(Finland) Jenni Heikkinen
(Sweden) Jessica Lundgren

Rüedi (Ryhner) – 11:00	1–0
	1–1	14:17 – Koyama (A. Sato)
Rüedi (Enzler) – 24:15	2–1
Rüedi (Ryhner, Enzler) – 25:40	3–1
Sigrist (Berta) – 45:59	4–1
Berta (Vallario) (PP) – 52:04	5–1
	5–2	54:05 – Ogawa (Tsutsumi)

2 min
Penalties
4 min
20
Shots
34

13 January 2017; 12:00	Japan	1–2 GWS (0–1, 1–0, 0–0) (OT: 0–0) (SO: 1–2)	Switzerland	Zimní stadion Přerov; Attendance: 112

Game reference
Mei Sato	Goalies	Saskia Maurer	Referee: (United States) Samantha Hiller; Linesmen: (Sweden) Liv Andersson (Slovakia) Magdalena Cerhitova
/ 0–1 / 03:14 – Christen; Ito (Koyama) – 36:56 / 1–1			Referee: (United States) Samantha Hiller; Linesmen: (Sweden) Liv Andersson (Slovakia) Magdalena Cerhitova
Ito (miss); Koyama (miss); Tsutsumi (miss); A. Sato (miss); Suzuki (miss); Tsutsumi (miss); A. Sato; Koyama (miss); A. Sato (miss)	Shootout	(miss) Rüedi; (miss) Enzler; (miss) Ryhner; (miss) Wetli; (miss) Zimmerman; (miss) Berta; Enzler; (miss) Schlegel; Enzler	Referee: (United States) Samantha Hiller; Linesmen: (Sweden) Liv Andersson (Slovakia) Magdalena Cerhitova
8 min	Penalties	2 min	Referee: (United States) Samantha Hiller; Linesmen: (Sweden) Liv Andersson (Slovakia) Magdalena Cerhitova
30	Shots	20	Referee: (United States) Samantha Hiller; Linesmen: (Sweden) Liv Andersson (Slovakia) Magdalena Cerhitova

== Final round ==
=== Bracket ===
Quarterfinals
A4	Sweden	2
B1	Finland	1
A3	Russia	2
B2	Czech Republic	0

Semifinals
A1	Canada	6
A4	Sweden	2
A2	United States	6
A3	Russia	0

Final
A1	Canada	1
A2	United States	3
Third place
A3	Russia	2
A4	Sweden	0

==== Quarterfinals ====
11 January 2017; 16:15	Russia	2–0 (0–0, 2–0, 0–0)	Czech Republic	Zimní stadion Přerov; Attendance: 1,496

Game reference
Valeria Merkusheva	Goalies	Kristýna Bláhová	Referee: (Sweden) Katarina Timglas; Linesmen: (Slovakia) Magdalena Cerhitova (Canada) Stephanie Gagnon
Braitisheva – 31:20 / 1–0; Provorova (Pirogova, Starovoitova) (PP2) – 39:10 / 2–0			Referee: (Sweden) Katarina Timglas; Linesmen: (Slovakia) Magdalena Cerhitova (Canada) Stephanie Gagnon
70 min	Penalties	43 min	Referee: (Sweden) Katarina Timglas; Linesmen: (Slovakia) Magdalena Cerhitova (Canada) Stephanie Gagnon
22	Shots	33	Referee: (Sweden) Katarina Timglas; Linesmen: (Slovakia) Magdalena Cerhitova (Canada) Stephanie Gagnon

11 January 2017; 20:15	Sweden	2–1 (1–0, 1–0, 0–1)	Finland	PSG Aréna Zlín; Attendance: 186

Game reference

Anna Amholt
Goalies
Jenna Silvonen
Referee:
(Canada) Lacey Senuk
Linesmen:
(Switzerland) Magali Anex
(United States) Jamie Fenstermacher

Olsson (Tedenby, Neunzert) (PP) – 13:39	1–0
Afbjur (Olsson) – 30:53	2–0
	2–1	43:38 – Parkkonen (Nieminen, Holopainen) (PP)

10 min
Penalties
10 min
36
Shots
16

==== Semifinals ====
13 January 2017; 16:00	United States	6–0 (2–0, 4–0, 0–0)	Russia	Zimní stadion Přerov; Attendance: 406

Game reference

Lindsay Reed
Goalies
Valeria Merkushev
Diana Farkhutdinova
Referee:
(Czech Republic) Radka Ruzickova
Linesmen:
(Sweden) Jessica Lundgren
(Czech Republic) Zuzana Svobodova

Zumwinkle (DeGeorge) – 03:39	1–0
Zumwinkle – 10:05	2–0
Wente (Heise) – 21:01	3–0
Skaja (Wente) – 23:56	4–0
Zumwinkle (Barnes) (PP) – 33:05	5–0
Heising (DeGeorge, Barnes) (PP) – 37:17	6–0

10 min
Penalties
10 min
51
Shots
6

13 January 2017; 16:00	Canada	6–2 (1–0, 2–2, 3–0)	Sweden	PSG Aréna Zlín; Attendance: 266

Game reference

Edith D'Astous-Moreau
Goalies
Sofia Reideborn
Referee:
(Russia) Yana Zueva
Linesmen:
(United States) Jamie Fenstermacher
(Finland) Jenni Heikkinen

Hobson (Vorster) (PP) – 04:11	1–0
Fillier (Maltais) – 26:13	2–0
Shirley – 28:39	3–0
	3–1	29:59 – Bouveng (Olsson)
	3–2	37:01 – Bergstrom (Lundin, Bouveng) (PP)
Shirley (Elia, Pettet) (PP) – 45:58	4–2
Fillier (ENG) – 56:41	5–2
Beres (Shirley, Pettet) – 59:08	6–2

35 min
Penalties
14 min
39
Shots
15

==== Fifth place game ====
13 January 2017; 20:00	Finland	2–0 (1–0, 1–0, 0–0)	Czech Republic	Zimní stadion Přerov; Attendance: 892

Game reference
Jenna Silvonen	Goalies	Denisa Jandová	Referee: (Canada) Lacey Senuk; Linesmen: (Switzerland) Magali Anex (France) Charlotte Girard
Kahra (Vesa, Nieminen) – 00:25 / 1–0; Melotindos (Seikkula, Nousiainen) – 31:49 / 2–0			Referee: (Canada) Lacey Senuk; Linesmen: (Switzerland) Magali Anex (France) Charlotte Girard
8 min	Penalties	16 min	Referee: (Canada) Lacey Senuk; Linesmen: (Switzerland) Magali Anex (France) Charlotte Girard
21	Shots	25	Referee: (Canada) Lacey Senuk; Linesmen: (Switzerland) Magali Anex (France) Charlotte Girard

==== Bronze medal game ====
14 January 2017; 16:00	Russia	2–0 (0–0, 0–0, 2–0)	Sweden	Zimní stadion Přerov; Attendance: 369

Game reference
Valeria Merkusheva	Goalies	Anna Amholt	Referee: (Canada) Lacey Senuk; Linesmen: (United States) Jamie Fenstermacher (Finland) Jenni Heikkinen
Provorova (Shatalova, Starovoitova) – 41:45 / 1–0; Beloglazova (Bolgareva, Bratisheva) (PP2) – 59:20 / 2–0			Referee: (Canada) Lacey Senuk; Linesmen: (United States) Jamie Fenstermacher (Finland) Jenni Heikkinen
12 min	Penalties	14 min	Referee: (Canada) Lacey Senuk; Linesmen: (United States) Jamie Fenstermacher (Finland) Jenni Heikkinen
32	Shots	32	Referee: (Canada) Lacey Senuk; Linesmen: (United States) Jamie Fenstermacher (Finland) Jenni Heikkinen

==== Gold medal game ====
14 January 2017; 19:00	Canada	1–3 (0–0, 0–1, 1–2)	United States	PSG Aréna Zlín; Attendance: 500

Game reference

Danika Ranger
Goalies
Alex Gulstene
Referee:
(Sweden) Katarina Timglas
Linesmen:
(France) Charlotte Girard
(Czech Republic) Zuzana Svobodova

	0–1	25:56 – Drake (DeGeorge) (PP)
Watts (Maltais) (PP) – 53:43	1–1
	1–2	57:28 – Zumwinkle (Degeorge)
	1–3	59:55 – Oden (Zumwinkle) (ENG)

6 min
Penalties
10 min
28
Shots
22

== Final ranking ==
Pos	Grp	Team	Pld	W	OTW	OTL	L	GF	GA	GD	Pts	Final result
1	A	United States	5	4	0	1	0	19	3	+16	13	Champions
2	A	Canada	5	3	1	0	1	17	8	+9	11	Runners-up
3	A	Russia	6	2	1	0	3	9	17	−8	8	Third place
4	A	Sweden	6	1	0	1	4	6	20	−14	4	Fourth place
5	B	Finland	5	3	0	1	1	10	6	+4	10	Fifth place game
6	B	Czech Republic (H)	5	1	1	1	2	8	11	−3	6	Fifth place game
7	B	Switzerland	5	2	2	0	1	13	9	+4	10	Advance in Relegation
8	B	Japan	5	0	0	1	4	6	14	−8	1	2018 IIHF World Women's U18 Championship Division I

Updated to match(es) played on January 14, 2017. Source: IIHF
(H) Host

== Tournament awards ==
Best players selected by the directorate

Best Goalkeeper	(Russia) Valeria Merkusheva
Best Defenseman	(United States) Cayla Barnes
Best Forward	(Canada) Sophie Shirley

== Statistics ==
=== Scoring leaders ===
Pos	Player	Country	GP	G	A	Pts	+/−	PIM
1	Lisa Rüedi	Switzerland	5	5	1	6	+4	0
2	Grace Zumwinkle	United States	5	4	2	6	+6	2
3	Cayla Barnes	United States	5	3	3	6	+5	4
4	Sophie Shirley	Canada	5	2	4	6	+1	2
5	Natalie Heising	United States	5	3	2	5	+4	2
6	Petra Nieminen	Finland	5	2	3	5	+4	4
6	Brette Pettet	Canada	5	2	3	5	+2	2
6	Noemi Ryhner	Switzerland	5	2	3	5	+5	2
9	Clair DeGeorge	United States	5	0	5	5	+3	4
10	Oxana Bratisheva	Russia	5	3	1	4	–3	31
10	Magdalena Erbenová	Czech Republic	5	3	1	4	+2	0

GP = Games played; G = Goals; A = Assists; Pts = Points; +/− = P Plus–minus; PIM = Penalties In Minutes
Source: IIHF.com

=== Goaltending leaders ===
(minimum 40% team's total ice time)

Pos	Player	Country	TOI	GA	GAA	Sv%	SO
1	Jenna Silvonen	Finland	240:00	3	0.75	96.97	2
2	Alex Gulstene	United States	181:57	3	0.99	95.89	0
3	Danika Ranger	Canada	180:41	3	1.00	95.08	1
4	Saskia Maurer	Switzerland	315:00	9	1.71	94.92	0
5	Valeria Merkusheva	Russia	288:56	11	2.28	93.41	2

TOI = Time on ice (minutes:seconds); GA = Goals against; GAA = Goals against average; Sv% = Save percentage; SO = Shutouts
Source: IIHF.com

== Division I ==
=== Group A ===
Was played in Budapest, Hungary 8–14 January 2017.

Pos	Team	Pld	W	OTW	OTL	L	GF	GA	GD	Pts	Qualification or relegation
1	Germany	5	4	0	0	1	18	5	+13	12	Promoted to Top Division
2	Slovakia	5	4	0	0	1	17	6	+11	12	
3	Norway	5	2	1	0	2	14	14	0	8	
4	Hungary	5	2	0	0	3	9	13	−4	6	
5	Austria	5	2	0	0	3	7	16	−9	6	
6	France	5	0	0	1	4	7	18	−11	1	Relegation to Division I B

Source: IIHF
Rules for classification: 1) points; 2) head-to-head points; 3) head-to-head goal difference; 4) head-to-head number of goals scored; 5) result against closest best-ranked team outside tied teams; 6) result against second-best ranked team outside tied teams; 7) seeding before tournament.

=== Group B ===
Was played in Katowice Poland, 8–14 January 2017.

Pos	Team	Pld	W	OTW	OTL	L	GF	GA	GD	Pts	Qualification or relegation
1	Italy	5	5	0	0	0	17	3	+14	15	Promoted to Division I A
2	Denmark	5	4	0	0	1	15	6	+9	12	
3	Poland	5	2	1	0	2	7	6	+1	8	
4	Great Britain	5	1	1	0	3	8	13	−5	5	
5	China	5	1	0	2	2	7	9	−2	5	
6	Kazakhstan	5	0	0	0	5	6	23	−17	0	Relegation to Division I B Qualification

Source: IIHF
Rules for classification: 1) points; 2) head-to-head points; 3) head-to-head goal difference; 4) head-to-head number of goals scored; 5) result against closest best-ranked team outside tied teams; 6) result against second-best ranked team outside tied teams; 7) seeding before tournament.

=== Group B qualification ===
Was played in San Sebastián Spain, 26–29 January 2017. This was the inaugural competition for this level, featuring the debuts of both Spain and Mexico.

Pos	Team	Pld	W	OTW	OTL	L	GF	GA	GD	Pts	Qualification or relegation
1	Australia	3	3	0	0	0	18	1	+17	9	Promoted to Division I B
2	Spain	3	2	0	0	1	13	9	+4	6	
3	Mexico	3	1	0	0	2	10	9	+1	3	
4	Romania	3	0	0	0	3	5	27	−22	0	

Source: IIHF
Rules for classification: 1) points; 2) head-to-head points; 3) head-to-head goal difference; 4) head-to-head number of goals scored; 5) result against closest best-ranked team outside tied teams; 6) result against second-best ranked team outside tied teams; 7) seeding before tournament.
