= Trinity Western Spartans women's ice hockey =

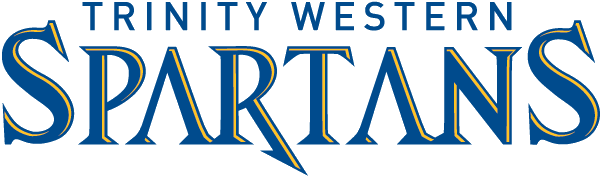
- University: Trinity Western University
- Conference: Canada West
- First season: 2020-21
- Head coach: Peter Hay; 3rd season, 40–56–0 (.417)
- Assistant coaches: Harold Wiens Eric Williams
- Arena: Langley Events Centre; Langley, British Columbia
- Colors: Blue and Gold

The Trinity Western Spartans women's ice hockey team is an ice hockey team representing the Trinity Western Spartans athletics program of Trinity Western University. The team is a member of the Canada West Universities Athletic Association conference and compete in U Sports. The Spartans play their home games at the Langley Events Centre in Langley, British Columbia.

== History ==
On November 10, 2022, the Spartans beat their provincial rivals, the UBC Thunderbirds for the first time. Prevailing by a 3-2 mark in overtime, Amy Potomak contributed three assists. Jordyn Matthews scored the overtime winner while goaltender Mabel Maltais made 47 saves in the win.

Qualifying for the 2023 Canada West Playoffs, the Spartans faced off against the Mount Royal Cougars. Making their playoff debut on February 17, 2023, the Cougars prevailed by a 1-0 tally. The following day, the Spartans earned their first playoff win in a 2-1 overtime win. Kate Klassen recorded the overtime goal while goaltender Kate Fawcett made 29 saves. Amy Potomak recorded the other Spartans goal.

Following the 2022-23 season, Amy Potomak was named a Canada West Second Team All-Star. She became the first Spartans women's hockey player to earn a year-end conference honor.

On February 21, 2026, the Spartans defeated the Calgary Dinos by a 4-2 mark. With the win, they swept the Dinos in their playoff series, qualifying for the Canada West Semifinals for the first time.

=== Rivalry ===
UBC Thunderbirds women's ice hockey

TWS victories	UBC victories	Tie games

No.	Date	Location	Winning team		Losing team	
1	October 1, 2021	Vancouver	TWS	1	UBC	2
2	October 15, 2021	Langley	UBC	3	TWS	1
3	October 16, 2021	Vancouver	TWS	0	UBC	8
4	December 3, 2021	Vancouver	TWS	3	UBC	8
5	December 4, 2021	Vancouver	TWS	2	UBC	5
6	February 11, 2022	Langley	UBC	4	TWS	1
7	February 12, 2022	Langley	UBC	7	TWS	5
8	September 15, 2022	Vancouver	TWS	1	UBC	3
9	November 10, 2022	Langley	UBC	2	TWS	3
10	November 12, 2022	Vancouver	TWS	3	UBC	4
11	February 3, 2023	Vancouver	TWS	0	UBC	3
12	February 4, 2023	Langley	UBC	2	TWS	1
13	September 15, 2023	Vancouver	TWS	2	UBC	0
14	October 20, 2023	Vancouver	TWS	2	UBC	7
15	October 21, 2023	Langley	UBC	4	TWS	1
16	January 19, 2024	Vancouver	TWS	0	UBC	6
17	January 20, 2024	Langley	UBC	4	TWS	1
18	September 28, 2024	Langley	UBC	3	TWS	0
19	October 18, 2024	Langley	UBC	1	TWS	0
20	October 19, 2024	Vancouver	TWS	1	UBC	4
21	December 6, 2024	Langley	UBC	3	TWS	0
22	December 7, 2024	Vancouver	TWS	1	UBC	3
23	January 16, 2025	Langley	UBC	4	TWS	1
24	January 17, 2025	Vancouver	TWS	3	UBC	4
25	September 27, 2025	Langley	UBC	3	TWS	1
26	October 10, 2025	Langley	UBC	3	TWS	1
27	October 11, 2025	Vancouver	TWS	2	UBC	3
28	December 5, 2025	Langley	UBC	3	TWS	2
29	December 6, 2025	Vancouver	TWS	0	UBC	3
30	January 23, 2026	Vancouver	TWS	2	UBC	4
31	January 24, 2026	Langley	UBC	4	TWS	0
32	February 27, 2026	Vancouver	TWS	0	UBC	4
33	February 28, 2026	Vancouver	TWS	1	UBC	3
Series: UBC leads 31–2

=== Season team scoring champion ===
Year	Player	GP	G	A	PTS	PIM
2025-26	Kyra MacDonald	26	8	11	19	14
2024-25	Kyra MacDonald	28	12	7	19	2
2023-24	Brooklyn Anderson	20	9	6	15	24
2022-23	Amy Potomak	27	12	12	24	46
2021-22	Brooklyn Anderson	15	4	6	10	42

== Awards and honours ==
=== Canada West honours ===
==== All-Stars ====
- Amy Potomak, 2022-23 Canada West Second Team All-Star
- Presleigh Geisbrecht, 2025-26 Canada West Second Team All-Star

==== All-Rookie Team ====
- Sadie Isfeld, 2025-26 Canada West All-Rookie Team

=== Spartan honours ===
==== Spartan of the Week ====
- Amy Potomak, Spartan Female Athlete of the Week (awarded January 31, 2023)
- Kyra Anderson, Spartan Female Athlete of the Week (awarded February 23, 2026)
