= Clair DeGeorge =

American ice hockey player (born 1999)

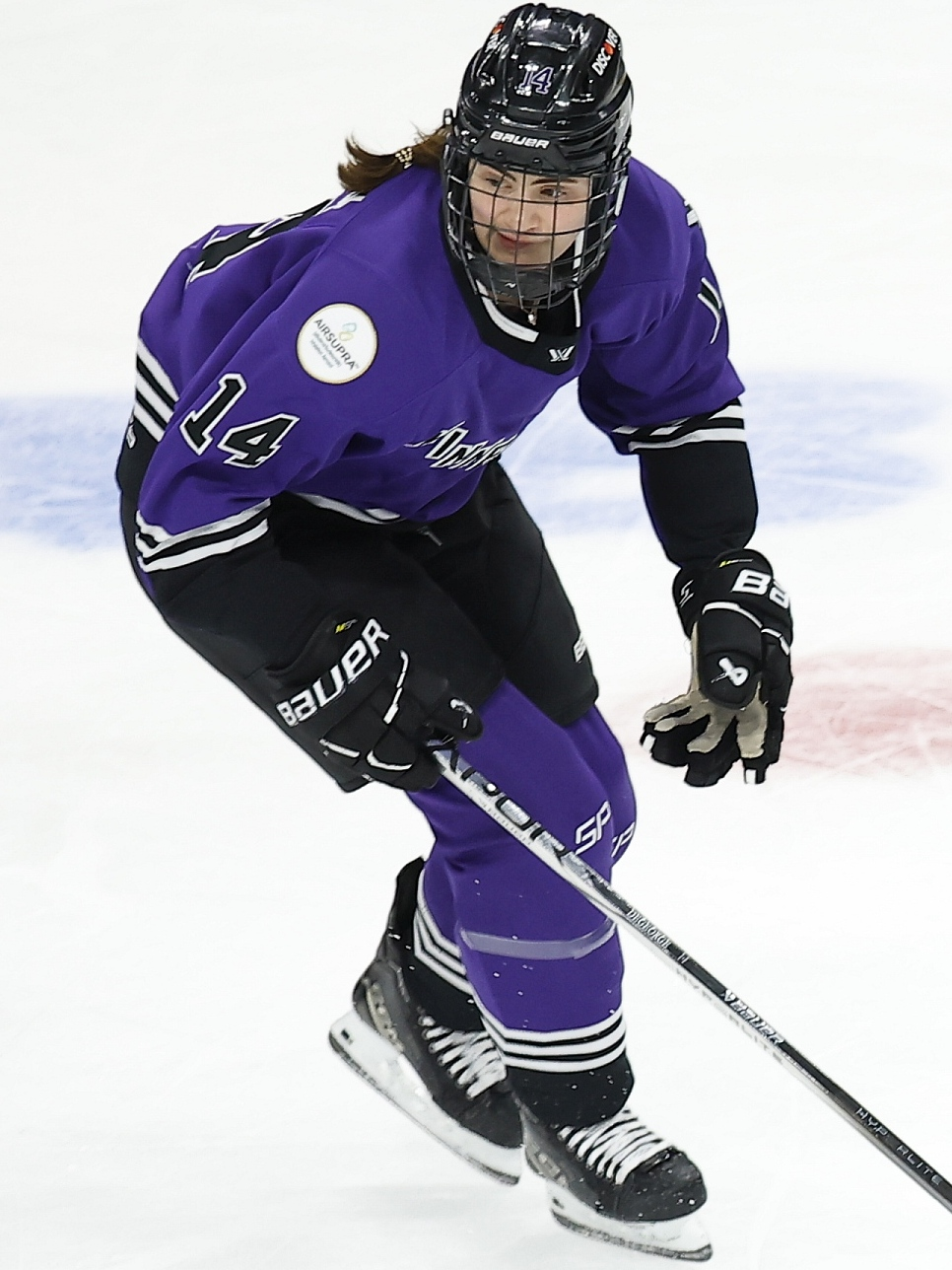
- DeGeorge with PWHL Minnesota in 2024
- Born: June 7, 1999 (age 27) Anchorage, Alaska, U.S.
- Height: 5 ft 11 in (180 cm)
- Weight: 170 lb (77 kg; 12 st 2 lb)
- Position: Forward
- Shoots: Left
- PWHL team Former teams: New York Sirens; Minnesota Frost; Montreal Victoire; Toronto Sceptres
- Playing career: 2017–present

Clair DeGeorge (born June 7, 1999) is an American professional ice hockey player who is a Forward for the New York Sirens of the Professional Women's Hockey League (PWHL). She previously played for the Minnesota Frost, Montreal Victoire and Toronto Sceptres of the PWHL. She played college ice hockey at Bemidji State and Ohio State.

== Early life ==
DeGeorge began figure skating at three years old, before transitioning to ice hockey. In Alaska she only played boys' hockey, until she moved to Minnesota to play for Shattuck-Saint Mary's at 13 years old. She played all four of her prep seasons for the Sabres, leading the team to a national championship each year.

== Playing career ==
=== College ===
DeGeorge began her collegiate career for Bemidji State during the 2017–18 season. During her freshman year, she recorded seven goals and 16 assists in 37 games. During the 2018–19 season in her sophomore year, she appeared in all 36 games and recorded nine goals and 13 assists. During the 2019–20 season in her junior year, she recorded seven goals and 15 assists in 35 games. She led the team in assists and ranked second in points. During 2020–21 season in her senior year, she served as co-captain and appeared in all 20 games and recorded five goals and seven assists in a season that was shortened due to the COVID-19 pandemic. She led the team in scoring and tied for the team lead with 59 shots on goal. She finished her Bemidji State career with 128 games played and totaled 79 points off of 28 goals and 51 assists. She finished her career tied for 10th on BSU's career assists list with 51 and tied for 12th in career points.

On April 8, 2021, DeGeorge announced she would transfer to Ohio State for her final year of eligibility. During the 2021–22 season in her graduate year, she appeared in all 38 games and recorded 16 goals and 30 assists. Her 30 assists ranked second on the team. During the 2022 NCAA Division I women's ice hockey tournament, she scored the game-winning goal in the double overtime against Quinnipiac to send the Buckeyes to the Frozen Four. During the national championship game against Minnesota Duluth she recorded one goal and one assist to help lead Ohio State to their first national championship in program history.

=== Professional ===
During the 2022–23 season, she played for Team Harvey's of the Professional Women's Hockey Players Association (PWHPA), where she recorded one goal and three assists in 18 games and won the Secret Cup.

On September 18, 2023, DeGeorge was drafted 36th overall by PWHL Minnesota in the 2023 PWHL Draft. During the 2023–24 season, she recorded three one assist in 23 regular season games. During the Walter Cup playoffs she served as Minnesota's fourth-line center and won the inaugural Walter Cup. During the 2024–25 season, she recorded two assists in 26 games for the Montreal Victoire.

On June 23, 2025, she signed a one-year contract with the Toronto Sceptres. On March 17, 2026, DeGeorge was traded to the New York Sirens in exchange for future considerations. Prior to being traded she was scoreless in 17 games for the Sceptres during the 2025–26 season. On June 20, 2026, she signed a one-year contract extension with the Sirens.

== International play ==
DeGeorge represented the United States at the 2017 IIHF World Women's U18 Championship where she recorded five assists in five games and won a gold medal. She recorded two assists in the gold medal game against Canada, including the assist on Grace Zumwinkle's game-winning goal.

== Personal life ==
DeGeorge was born to John and Lynn DeGeorge. Her mother Lynn was an All-American swimmer at Indiana University. Her two sisters swam at the collegiate level. Tara swam for Air Force and Leah swam for Florida.

She earned her nursing degree from Bemidji State University and earned her masters of bioethics from Ohio State University. In addition to her ice hockey career, she's a vascular nurse at the Mayo Clinic in Rochester, Minnesota.

== Career statistics ==
=== Regular season and playoffs ===
Note: GP = Games played; G = Goals; A = Assists; Pts = Points; PIM = Penalty minutes;

			Regular season					Playoffs
Season	Team	League	GP	G	A	Pts	PIM	GP	G	A	Pts	PIM
2017–18	Bemidji State Beavers	WCHA	37	7	16	23	8	—	—	—	—	—
2018–19	Bemidji State Beavers	WCHA	36	9	13	22	18	—	—	—	—	—
2019–20	Bemidji State Beavers	WCHA	35	7	15	22	22	—	—	—	—	—
2020–21	Bemidji State Beavers	WCHA	20	5	7	12	4	—	—	—	—	—
2021–22	Ohio State Buckeyes	WCHA	38	16	30	46	4	—	—	—	—	—
2022–23	Team Harvey's	PWHPA	18	1	3	4	6	—	—	—	—	—
2023–24	PWHL Minnesota	PWHL	23	0	1	1	6	10	0	0	0	4
2024–25	Montreal Victoire	PWHL	26	0	2	2	1	0	0	0	0	0
2025–26	Toronto Sceptres	PWHL	17	0	0	0	4	—	—	—	—	—
2025–26	New York Sirens	PWHL	9	0	2	2	2	—	—	—	—	—
PWHPA totals			18	1	3	4	6	—	—	—	—	—
PWHL totals			75	0	5	5	16	11	0	0	0	4

=== International ===
Note: GP = Games played; G = Goals; A = Assists; Pts = Points; PIM = Penalty minutes;

				Regular season
Year	Team	Event	Result	GP	G	A	Pts	PIM
2017	United States	U18	1st place, gold medalist(s)	5	0	5	5	4
Junior totals				5	0	5	5	4
