= Naomi Rogge =

American ice hockey player

- Born: January 2, 1999 (age 26); Eden Prairie, Minnesota, US
- Height: 5 ft 5 in (165 cm)
- Position: Forward
- Shoots: Left
- SDHL team Former teams: Linköping HC; SDE Hockey; Minnesota Duluth Bulldogs
- Playing career: 2017–present

Naomi Kathryn Rogge (born January 2, 1999) is an American ice hockey player who plays as a forward for Linköping HC in the Swedish Women's Hockey League (SDHL).

== Playing career ==
During her time at Eden Prairie High School in her hometown of Eden Prairie, Minnesota, Rogge was a standout multi-sport athlete. In 2016, she helped lead the Eagles to capture the Minnesota State High School League (MSHSL) state championship. Her outstanding performances and leadership earned her recognition as one of the top players in the state, culminating in her selection as a finalist for the 2017 Minnesota Ms. Hockey Award. Beyond hockey, Rogge showcased her athletic versatility by competing in lacrosse and association football.

Rogge began her collegiate ice hockey career with the Minnesota Duluth Bulldogs women's ice hockey team in 2017 as a freshman. In her collegiate debut season, she tallied 24 points over 35 games, leading the Bulldogs in scoring and finishing fifth among all rookies in the Western Collegiate Hockey Association (WCHA) conference. She maintained steady production in her sophomore year, posting 23 points in 35 games, despite opening the season without a point in her first six games. In January 2019, she was recognized as the NCAA Player of the Week. Unfortunately, she missed the entire 2019–20 campaign due to a knee injury sustained during the preseason, becoming the third UMD player in five years to lose a full season to a knee injury. Rogge returned to action in 2020–21 season, netting her first goal of the season in the team's opening game.
