= Mei Sato =

Japanese ice hockey goaltender

Mei Sato 佐藤 めい
- Born: 21 September 2000 (age 26)
- Height: 1.57 m (5 ft 2 in)
- Weight: 52 kg (115 lb; 8 st 3 lb)
- Position: Goaltender
- Catches: Left
- WJIHL team: Kushiro Bears
- National team: Japan
- Playing career: c. 2016–present

Mei Sato (佐藤 めい, Satō Mei; born 21 September 2000) is a Japanese ice hockey goaltender and member of the Japanese national ice hockey team, currently playing with the Kushiro Bears of the Women's Japan Ice Hockey League (WJIHL) and All-Japan Women's Ice Hockey Championship.

Sato represented Japan at the 2021 IIHF Women's World Championship, where she served as third goaltender behind starter Nana Fujimoto and back-up Akane Konishi. As a junior player with the Japanese national under-18 team, she participated in the 2017 IIHF Women's U18 World Championship and the 2018 IIHF Women's U18 World Championship – Division I, Group A.
