= Cayla Barnes =

American ice hockey player (born 1999)

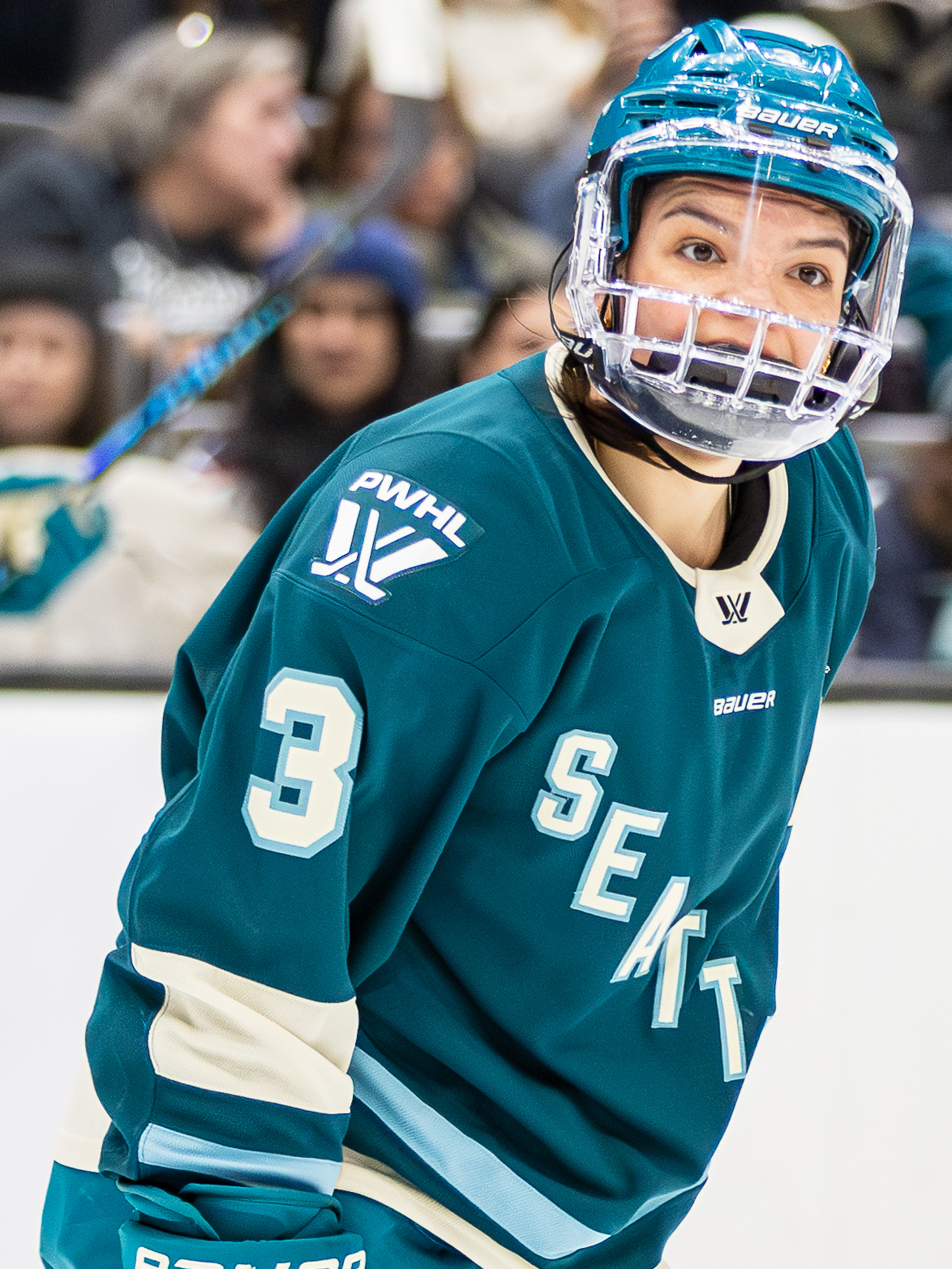
- Barnes with the Seattle Torrent in 2026
- Born: January 7, 1999 (age 27) Eastvale, California, U.S.
- Height: 5 ft 2 in (157 cm)
- Weight: 139 lb (63 kg; 9 st 13 lb)
- Position: Defense
- Shoots: Right
- PWHL team Former teams: Detroit Clutch; Seattle Torrent; Montreal Victoire
- National team: United States
- Playing career: 2017–present
Medal record
Representing United States
Olympic Games
Gold medal – first place	2018 Pyeongchang	Team
Gold medal – first place	2026 Milano Cortina	Team
Silver medal – second place	2022 Beijing	Team
World Championship
Gold medal – first place	2019 Finland
Gold medal – first place	2023 Canada
Gold medal – first place	2025 Czechia
Gold medal – first place	2026 Denmark
Silver medal – second place	2021 Canada
Silver medal – second place	2022 Denmark
Silver medal – second place	2024 United States

Cayla Marie Barnes (born January 7, 1999) is an American ice hockey player for the Detroit Clutch of the Professional Women's Hockey League (PWHL) and the United States women's national ice hockey team. She previously played for the Montreal Victoire and Seattle Torrent.

A three-time Olympic medalist, Barnes won gold at the 2018 Winter Olympics as the youngest player on Team USA, silver at the 2022 Winter Olympics, and gold at the 2026 Winter Olympics. She has competed in six IIHF Women's World Championships, earning three gold medals (2019, 2023, 2025) and three silver medals (2021, 2022, 2024), and was named to the tournament all-star team in 2019. Barnes is the first player in history to win three consecutive gold medals at the IIHF World Women's U18 Championship (2015, 2016, 2017), earning Best Defender honors in 2016 and 2017.

Barnes played college ice hockey at Boston College and Ohio State, where she won the 2024 NCAA National Championship with the Buckeyes. She was drafted fifth overall by PWHL Montreal in the 2024 PWHL draft and later signed with the expansion Seattle Torrent in 2025.

== Early life ==
Born in Eastvale, California to Michelle Church and Scott Barnes, Cayla is the youngest of five siblings with four older brothers. Barnes initially began skating as a figure skater, her mother's preference after having four sons. However, she was drawn to ice hockey after watching the hockey program at the other end of the rink during her figure skating lessons, and switched to ice hockey around age three. Growing up in Eastvale within driving distance to Anaheim and Los Angeles, Barnes' four older brothers all played roller hockey, which inspired her to start playing as well. "I just loved it from the start," Barnes said. "I just kept going with it. But I definitely got into it because they all played, and I just wanted to do what they did."

As a youth player in Southern California, Barnes played for the 10U Anaheim Ducks, Lady Ducks, 12U LA Selects, and 14U LA Kings. Due to limited girls' hockey programs in California at the time, she primarily played on boys' teams during her development years. Barnes watched the 2010 Winter Olympics at around age 11 and decided she wanted to pursue college hockey and make a national team roster. Recognizing that opportunities for recruitment and development were greater on the East Coast, she left California at age 14 after completing eighth grade to attend boarding school. She moved to Massachusetts to play for the East Coast Wizards at the 14U, 16U, and 19U levels before enrolling at New Hampton School in New Hampshire. Barnes was a multi-sport athlete at New Hampton and played ice hockey, soccer, and lacrosse.

== Playing career ==
=== College ===
==== Boston College (2017–2023) ====
Barnes enrolled at Boston College in the fall of 2017 and played in the first five games of the season before receiving a call-up to join the U.S. Women's National Team in Tampa, Florida, on October 28, 2017. She withdrew from Boston College to prepare for the 2018 Winter Olympics, preserving her freshman year of eligibility, and returned in August 2018 to restart her freshman year both academically and athletically.

Barnes returned to Boston College as a redshirt freshman for the 2018–19 season, playing in 36 games and recording 19 points on five goals and 14 assists. She was named to both the Hockey East Third Team All-Star and All-Rookie Team. In her sophomore season (2019–20), Barnes tallied a career-high six goals and 17 assists for 23 points in 35 games, while leading all Hockey East skaters and ranking third in the NCAA with 103 blocked shots. She earned Hockey East Second Team All-Star honors.

Barnes was one of three co-captains for Boston College in the 2020–21 season, joining teammates Meagan Beres and Kelly Browne. In the COVID-shortened season, she recorded 10 points on four goals and six assists in 19 games while leading the team with 36 blocked shots. She was named a Hockey East First Team All-Star and AHCA Second Team All-American.

Barnes took a leave of absence from Boston College for the 2021–22 season to compete in the 2022 Winter Olympics. She returned for the 2022–23 season as team captain in her redshirt senior year, recording 19 points on six goals and 13 assists in 36 games while leading BC with 63 blocked shots. She was named Hockey East Second Team All-Star and earned Hockey East Defender of the Month honors in January 2023. Barnes concluded her Boston College career with 75 points (20 goals, 55 assists) in 131 games, ranking seventh all-time among BC defenders in points.

==== Ohio State (2023–2024) ====
On March 25, 2023, Barnes announced that she would be transferring to Ohio State University for the 2023–24 season. In her lone season with the Buckeyes and her final year of NCAA eligibility, Barnes recorded 36 points on 11 goals and 25 assists in 39 games. Her +71 plus-minus rating led the nation by 16 over the next-best player.

In the finals of the 2024 NCAA Championship game, Barnes made a crucial defensive play to break up a Wisconsin breakaway before assisting on the championship-winning goal scored by Joy Dunne in Ohio State's 1–0 victory over Wisconsin. The title capped off Barnes' six-year collegiate career with her first NCAA national championship. She was named Second Team AHCA All-American for the season.

=== Professional ===
==== PWHL Montreal (2024–2025) ====
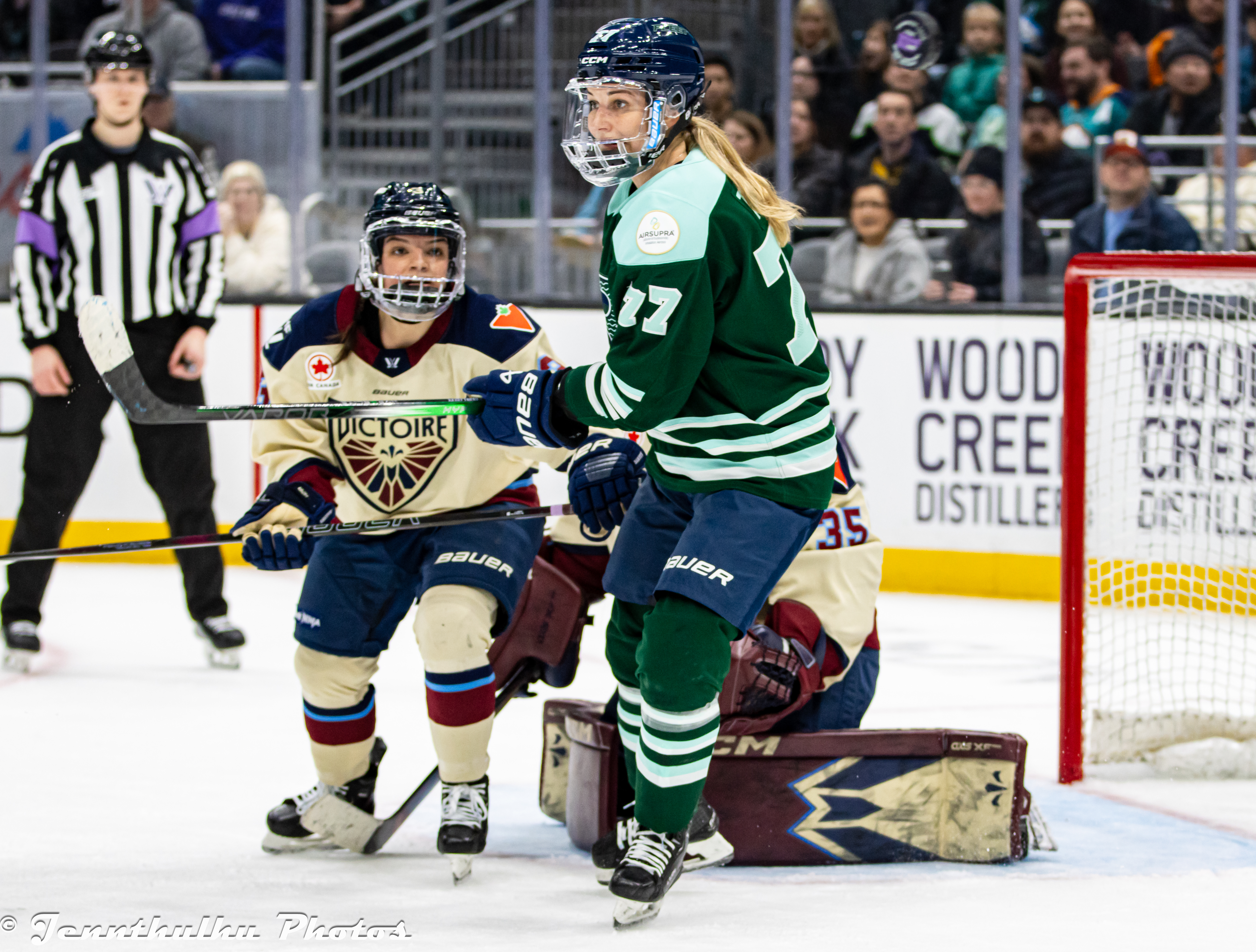
Barnes defends against Boston Fleet, January 2025

- Barnes' first professional goal PWHL Montreal, December 5, 2024

On June 10, 2024, Barnes was drafted in the first round, fifth overall by PWHL Montreal in the 2024 PWHL draft. She signed a three-year contract with the team on June 21, 2024. During the 2024–25 PWHL season, Barnes led all Victoire players in time on ice and recorded two goals and 11 assists for 13 points in 30 regular season games, ranking third among all PWHL rookies in scoring.

On December 4, 2024, Barnes scored her first professional goal on a breakaway against the New York Sirens, receiving a pass from Jennifer Gardiner and finishing with a backhand shot in a 4–1 loss at Place Bell. On March 8, 2025, Barnes scored a dramatic overtime goal just 21 seconds into the extra period to give Montreal a 3–2 victory over the Boston Fleet at Agganis Arena before a sellout crowd of 5,968. The backhand goal on a rush, assisted by Laura Stacey, snapped Boston's franchise-record seven-game home winning streak and was Barnes' second goal of the season.

Montreal finished first in the regular season standings with 53 points (12–7–3–8) but was eliminated in the first round of the 2025 PWHL playoffs by the Ottawa Charge in four games.

==== Seattle Torrent (2025–2026) ====
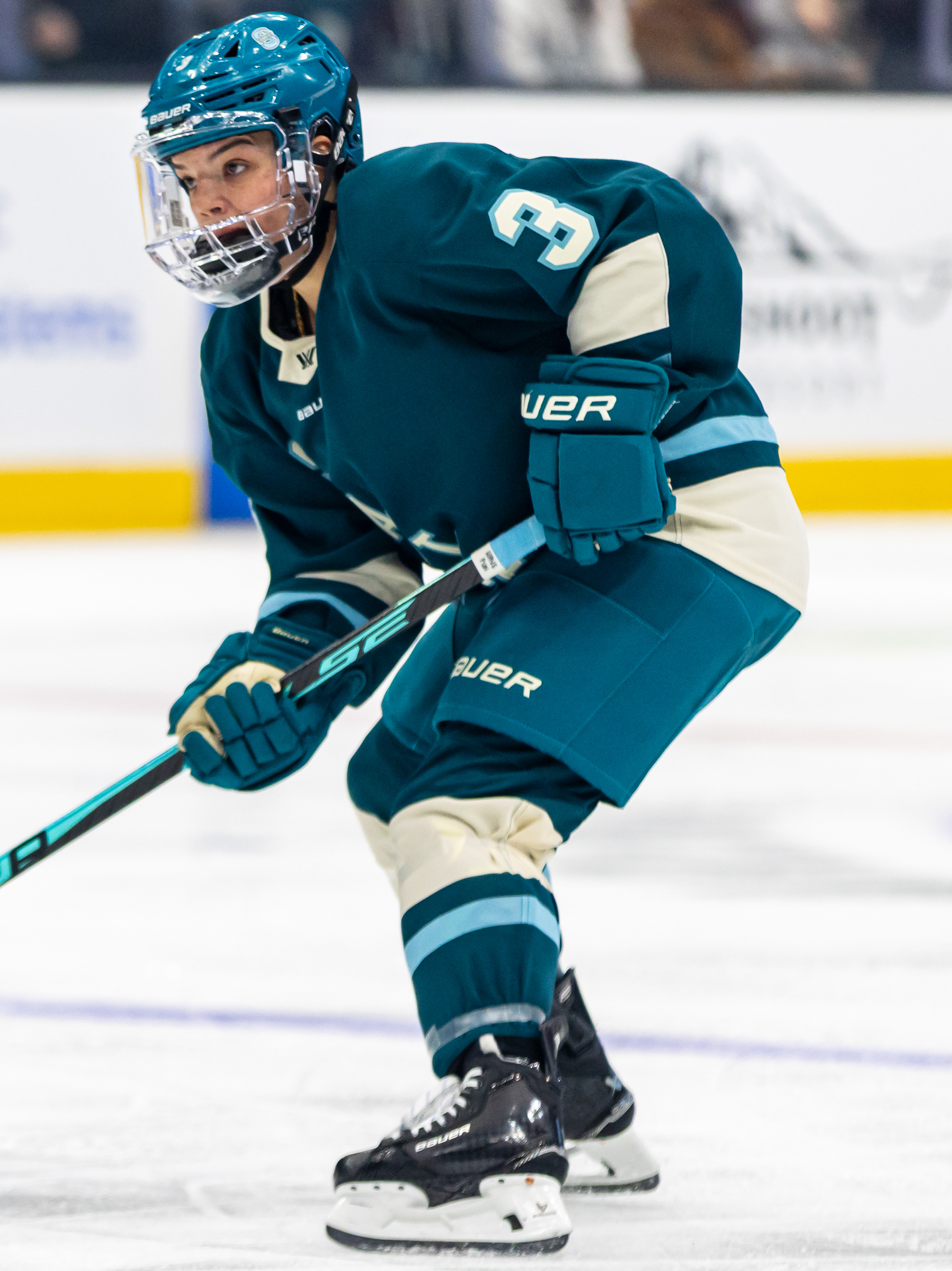
Barnes with the Seattle Torrent in 2025

During the league's expansion to eight teams ahead of the 2025–26 season, Barnes was left unprotected by the Victoire and signed a three-year contract with the Seattle Torrent on June 5, 2025. Barnes was one of the Torrent's marquee signings during general manager Meghan Turner's exclusive signing window, joining Hilary Knight and Alex Carpenter as the foundation of the expansion franchise.

The Torrent made their home debut on November 28, 2025, at Climate Pledge Arena against the Minnesota Frost. The game drew 16,014 fans, setting a new attendance record for a women's hockey game in a U.S. arena and becoming the highest-attended home venue game in PWHL history. Although Seattle lost the game 3–0, the crowd's enthusiastic support throughout the match signaled strong community backing for the expansion franchise.

On December 3, 2025, the Torrent earned their first franchise victory with a dramatic 2–1 win over the New York Sirens at Climate Pledge Arena. Barnes played a key role in the comeback victory, assisting on both Seattle goals scored in the final 90 seconds of the game. Trailing 1–0 late in the third period, Barnes passed to Hannah Bilka, whose shot created a rebound that Carpenter buried for Seattle's first home goal in franchise history at 18:36. Twenty-two seconds later, Barnes and Bilka combined again, with Knight scoring the game-winner in front of 8,622 fans. On January 20, 2026, Barnes recorded an assist in Seattle's 6–4 victory over Toronto. The Torrent's six goals set a franchise record and matched the season high for any PWHL team.

==== Detroit Clutch (2026–present) ====
During the league's expansion to 12 teams ahead of the 2026–27 season, Barnes was left unprotected by the Torrent and signed a three-year contract with the Detroit Clutch on June 5, 2026.

== International play ==
Barnes has represented the United States on both youth and senior national teams, earning multiple medals in international competition. She is the first player in history to win three consecutive gold medals at the IIHF Women's World U18 Championship and has competed in two Olympic Games, winning gold in 2018 and silver in 2022. At the senior level, she has participated in six World Championships, earning three gold and three silver medals.

=== Junior national team ===
Barnes represented the United States at the 2015, 2016, and 2017 IIHF Women's World U18 Championship, becoming the first player in history to win three consecutive gold medals at the tournament. She was named Best Defender of the tournament in both 2016 and 2017, and served as team captain in 2017. In 15 total games across the three tournaments, Barnes recorded three goals and nine assists for 12 points. She also participated in the 2017 U.S. Women's Residency Program.

=== Senior national team ===
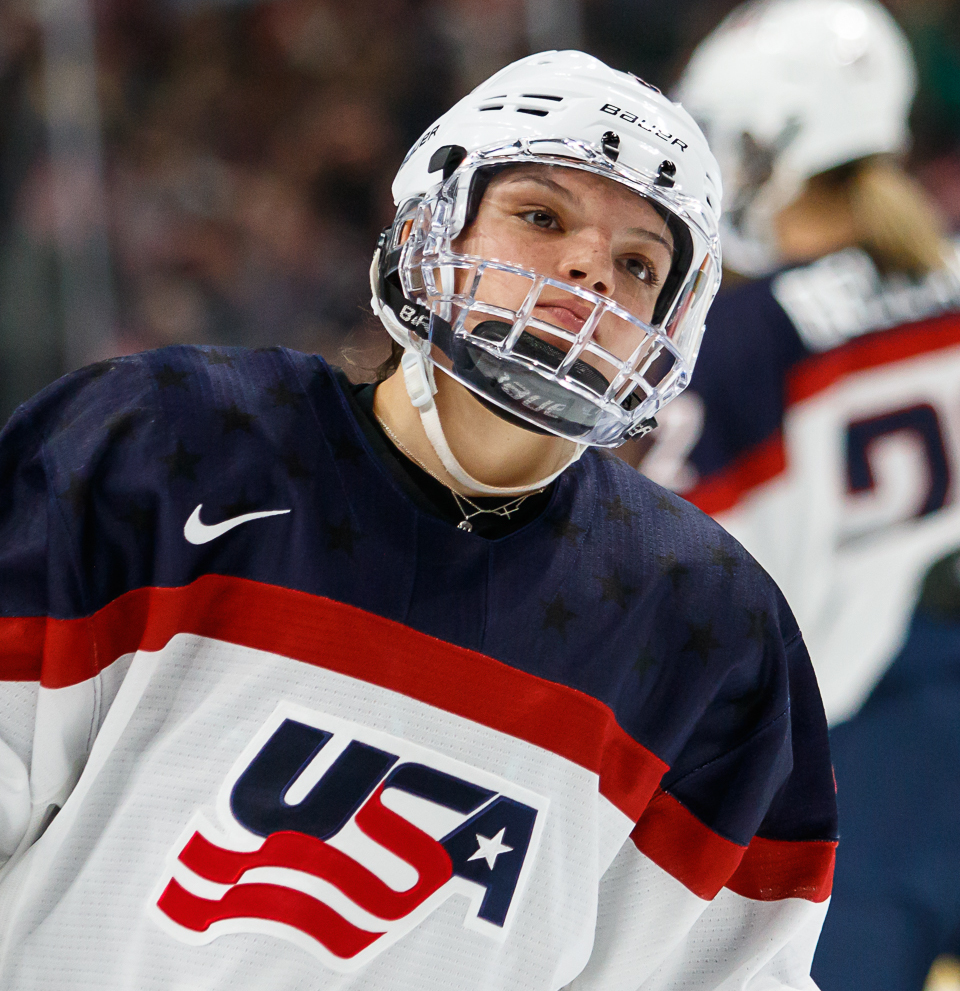
Barnes playing for Team USA, 2017

==== 2018 Olympics ====
After being called up to the national team in late October 2017, Barnes made her senior debut at the 2018 Winter Olympics at the age of 19, becoming the youngest player on the team. Prior to making the Olympic roster, she scored two goals and one assist while helping Team USA win the 2017 4 Nations Cup. Barnes played in all five Olympic games and won a gold medal as part of the team that defeated Canada 3–2 in a shootout in the final. The victory marked the United States' first Olympic gold medal in women's hockey since 1998.

==== World Championships ====
Barnes made her World Championship debut at the 2019 IIHF Women's World Championship in Espoo, Finland, scoring two goals and four assists for six points in seven games. She tied for third among all defensemen in points and tied for second in plus/minus (+8). The United States won gold by defeating Finland 2–1 in a shootout, and Barnes was named to the tournament Media All-Star Team.

At the 2021 IIHF Women's World Championship in Calgary, Barnes won a silver medal as the United States fell to Canada 3–2 in overtime in the gold medal game. Barnes returned to the 2022 IIHF Women's World Championship in Herning, Denmark, where she recorded five points on one goal and four assists as the United States earned another silver medal, losing 2–1 to Canada in the final.

At the 2023 IIHF Women's World Championship in Brampton, Ontario, Barnes recorded three assists in the semifinal victory over the Czech Republic, including the primary assist on Amanda Kessel's opening power-play goal in the 9–1 win. In the gold medal game, she scored the insurance empty-net goal with 1:58 remaining in the United States' 6–3 victory over Canada, giving USA Hockey its first World Championship gold medal since 2019.

Barnes competed at the 2024 IIHF Women's World Championship in Utica, New York, recording two assists through seven games. In the gold medal game, the United States lost to Canada 6–5 in overtime with Canada scoring the golden goal at 5:16 of overtime on a power play. Barnes and Team USA earned a silver medal. At the 2025 IIHF Women's World Championship in České Budějovice, Czech Republic, Barnes won her third World Championship gold medal. The United States defeated Canada 4–3 in overtime in the gold medal game.

==== 2022 Olympics ====
On January 2, 2022, Barnes was named to Team USA's roster for the 2022 Winter Olympics in Beijing. In the semifinal victory over Finland, Barnes scored a goal and added an assist as the United States won 4–1. Barnes finished the tournament with two goals and four assists for six points in seven games, earning a silver medal after the United States lost to Canada in the gold medal game.

==== 2026 Olympics ====
Barnes was named to the U.S. roster for the 2025 Rivalry Series against Canada in October 2025. She was part of a Seattle Torrent contingent that included teammates Hilary Knight, Alex Carpenter, Hannah Bilka, and Anna Wilgren on the U.S. roster. The United States swept all four games of the series, outscoring Canada 24–7 overall, marking the first sweep in Rivalry Series history.

On January 2, 2026, she was named to team USA's roster for the 2026 Winter Olympics.

== Personal life ==
Barnes earned a Bachelor of Science degree in Communication and Management in Leadership from Boston College and pursued a Master's degree in Sports Management at Ohio State University. Her hobbies include roller hockey, soccer, lacrosse, reading, and painting. According to her USA Hockey profile, Barnes models her play after Scott Niedermayer, and her favorite postgame meal is pasta, chicken and green beans.

Barnes is represented by Creative Artists Agency (CAA).

== Career statistics ==
=== Regular season and playoffs ===
			Regular season					Playoffs
Season	Team	League	GP	G	A	Pts	PIM	GP	G	A	Pts	PIM
2017–18	Boston College	HE	5	0	0	0	4	—	—	—	—	—
2018–19	Boston College	HE	36	4	19	23	44	—	—	—	—	—
2019–20	Boston College	HE	35	6	17	23	40	—	—	—	—	—
2020–21	Boston College	HE	19	4	6	10	14	—	—	—	—	—
2022–23	Boston College	HE	36	6	13	19	34	—	—	—	—	—
2023–24	Ohio State University	WCHA	39	11	25	36	28	—	—	—	—	—
2024–25	Montreal Victoire	PWHL	30	2	11	13	12	4	0	0	0	0
2025–26	Seattle Torrent	PWHL	30	3	5	8	20	—	—	—	—	—
PWHL totals			60	5	16	21	32	4	0	0	0	0

=== International ===
Year	Team	Event	Result	GP	G	A	Pts	PIM
2015	United States	U18	1st place, gold medalist(s)	5	0	0	0	0
2016	United States	U18	1st place, gold medalist(s)	5	0	6	6	2
2017	United States	U18	1st place, gold medalist(s)	5	3	3	6	5
2018	United States	OG	1st place, gold medalist(s)	5	0	0	0	0
2019	United States	WC	1st place, gold medalist(s)	7	2	4	6	4
2021	United States	WC	2nd place, silver medalist(s)	7	0	3	3	0
2022	United States	OG	2nd place, silver medalist(s)	7	1	5	6	0
2022	United States	WC	2nd place, silver medalist(s)	7	1	4	5	0
2023	United States	WC	1st place, gold medalist(s)	7	2	6	8	8
2024	United States	WC	2nd place, silver medalist(s)	7	0	2	2	0
2025	United States	WC	1st place, gold medalist(s)	7	0	1	1	0
2026	United States	OG	1st place, gold medalist(s)	7	1	0	1	2
Junior totals				15	3	9	12	6
Senior totals				61	7	25	32	14

== Awards and honors ==
Honors	Year	Ref
College
Hockey East Third Team All-Star	2019	
Hockey East All-Rookie Team	2019	
Hockey East Second Team All-Star	2020	
Hockey East First Team All-Star	2021	
AHCA Second Team All-American	2021	
USCHO.com Second Team All-Star	2021	
Hockey East Second Team All-Star	2023	
AHCA Second Team All-American	2024	
Frozen Four All-Tournament Team	2024	
First Team All-WCHA	2024	
WCHA Scholar-Athlete	2024	
PWHL
All-Rookie Team	2025	
International
World U18 Championship – Best Defender	2016, 2017	
World U18 Championship – Media All-Star Team	2016	
World Championship – Media All-Star Team	2019	
