= 2020–21 Wisconsin Badgers women's ice hockey season =

WCHA Regular Season champions WCHA Final Faceoff champions NCAA Frozen Four champions, 2–1 (OT) vs. Northeastern
- Conference: WCHA
- Home ice: LaBahn Arena

Rankings
- USCHO.com: 1

Record
- Overall: 14–3–1
- Home: 5–1–0
- Road: 7–2–1
- Neutral: 3–0–0

Coaches and captains
- Head coach: Mark Johnson (18th season)
- Assistant coaches: Dan Koch; Jackie Crum; Mark Greenhalgh
- Captain(s): Grace Bowlby; Brette Pettet; Daryl Watts
- Alternate captain(s): Caitlin Schneider; Britta Curl

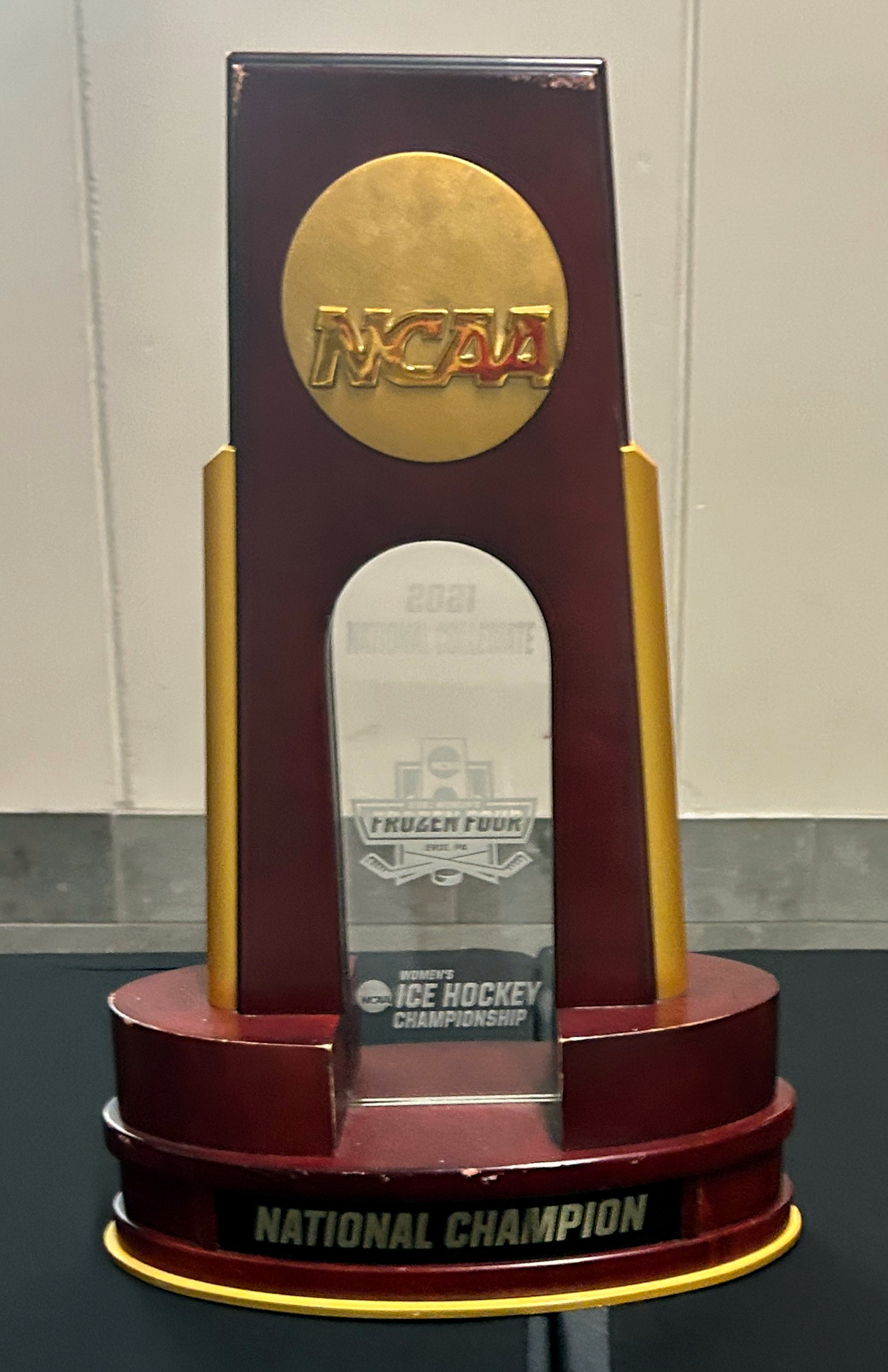
championship trophy

The Wisconsin Badgers represented the University of Wisconsin in WCHA women's ice hockey during the 2020-21 NCAA Division I women's ice hockey season. In the WCHA Final Faceoff championship game, the Badgers defeated the Ohio State Buckeyes by a 3–2 mark in overtime, as Lacey Eden scored the game-winning goal. Appearing in the 2021 NCAA National Collegiate Women's Ice Hockey Tournament versus the Northeastern Huskies, Daryl Watts scored the game-winning goal in a 2−1 overtime win.

== Offseason ==
- September 3: Mercyhurst Lakers goaltender Kennedy Blair has transferred to the Badgers.

=== Recruiting ===
Player	Position	Nationality	Notes
Jane Gervais	Goaltender	Canada	As a sophomore and junior, she led the Stanstead College Varsity Girls Hockey team to gold medals at the NAPHA Playoff Championships. As a senior, she posted 14 shutouts.
Casey O'Brien	Forward	United States	She skated for Team USA in 2018 and 2019 at the IIHF Under-18 Women's World Championships
Makenna Webster	Forward	United States	She led Team USA in scoring at the 2018 and 2019 IIHF U-18 World Championships. At the 2020 edition of the event, she was named an alternate captain and captured the gold medal.
Maddi Wheeler	Forward	Canada	She scored the gold medal-winning goal for Canada, in overtime, at the 2019 IIHF Under-18 Women's World Championships.
Mayson Toft	Defense	United States	As a high school varsity hockey player for Alexandria High School, she gained Defensive Player of the Year honors for four consecutive years.

== Regular season ==
=== Standings ===
2020–21 Western Collegiate Hockey Association standings
	Conference								Overall					
	GP	W	L	T	SW	PTS	GF	GA	GP	W	L	T	GF	GA
#1 Wisconsin † *	16	12	3	1	0	36	62	25	21	17	3	1	79	33
#4 Minnesota Duluth	16	11	5	0	0	34	50	23	23	12	7	0	55	33
#3 Ohio State	16	11	5	0	0	32	42	32	20	13	7	0	56	42
#6 Minnesota	19	11	7	0	1	36	62	40	20	11	8	1	65	45
Minnesota State	20	7	12	1	0	20	38	56	20	7	12	1	38	56
St. Cloud State	19	6	12	1	0	18.5	32	62	19	6	12	1	32	62
Bemidji State	20	2	16	2	1	12.5	24	72	20	2	16	2	24	72
Championship: March 8, 2021 † indicates conference regular season champion; * indicates conference tournament champion Rankings: USCHO.com; updated March 25, 2021

=== Schedule ===
Date	Opponent^{#}	Rank^{#}	Site	Decision	Result	Record
Regular Season
November 27	at Ohio State	#1	Columbus, OH	Andrea Braendli	L 2–3	0–1–0 (0–1–0)
November 28	at Ohio State		Columbus, OH	Kennedy Blair	W 5–0	1–1–0 (1–1–0)
January 2	at MSU Mankato		Mankato	Kennedy Blair	W 3–2	2–1–0 (2–1–0)
January 3	at MSU Mankato		Mankato	Kennedy Blair	W 1–0	3–1–0 (3–1–0)
January 8	Ohio State		La Bahn Arena • Madison, WI	Kennedy Blair	W 2–1	4–1–0 (4–1–0)
January 9	Ohio State	#1	La Bahn Arena • Madison, WI	Andrea Braendli	L 1–2	4–2–0 (4–2–0)
January 15	Minnesota	#2	La Bahn Arena • Madison, WI	Kennedy Blair	W 5–0	5–2–0 (5–2–0)
January 16	Minnesota	#2	La Bahn Arena • Madison, WI	Kennedy Blair	W 6–3	6–2–0 (6–2–0)
January 22	at St. Cloud State	#1	St. Cloud, MN	Kennedy Blair	W 10–0	7–2–0 (7–2–0)
January 23	at St. Cloud State	#1	St. Cloud, MN	Kennedy Blair	W 4–2	8–2–0 (8–2–0)
February 5	at Minnesota	#4	Ridder Arena • Minneapolis, MN	Kennedy Blair	W 4–3	9–2–0 (9–2–0)
February 6	at Minnesota		Ridder Arena • Minneapolis, MN	Kennedy Blair	T 2–2 ^{OT}	9–2–1 (9–2–1)
February 12	Bemidji State	#1	La Bahn Arena • Madison, WI	Kennedy Blair	W 4–0	10–2–1 (10–2–1)
February 13	Bemidji State	#1	La Bahn Arena • Madison, WI	Kennedy Blair	W 7–0	11–2–1 (11–2–1)
February 26	Minnesota Duluth Bulldogs		AMSOIL Arena • Duluth, MN	Emma Soderberg	L 2–4	11–3–1 (11–3–1)
February 27	Minnesota Duluth Bulldogs		AMSOIL Arena • Duluth, MN	Kennedy Blair	W 4–3	12–3–1 (12–3–1)
WCHA Frozen Faceoff
March 6	vs. Minnesota		Ridder Arena • Minneapolis, MN	Kennedy Blair	W 5–3	13–3–1 (13–3–1)
March 7	vs. Minnesota		Ridder Arena • Minneapolis, MN	Kennedy Blair	W 3–2 ^{OT}	14–3–1 (14–3–1)
NCAA Tournament
March 16	vs. Providence		Erie Insurance Arena • Erie, PA	Kennedy Blair	W 3–0	15–3–1 (14–3–1)
March 18	vs. Ohio State		Erie Insurance Arena • Erie, PA	Kennedy Blair	W 4–2	16–3–1 (15–3–1)
March 20	vs. Northeastern		Erie Insurance Arena • Erie, PA	Kennedy Blair	W 2–1 ^{OT}	17–3–1 (15–3–1)
*Non-conference game. ^{#}Rankings from USCHO.com Poll.

== Roster ==
=== 2020–21 Badgers ===
No.	Nat.	Player	Class	Pos	Height	DoB	Hometown	Previous team
1		Jane Grevais	Freshman	G	5' 8" (1.73 m)		Valcourt, Quebec	Stanstead College
2		Natalie Buchbinder	Senior	D	5' 8" (1.73 m)		Fairport, New York	Shattuck-St. Mary's
4		Teagan Grant	Sophomore	D	5' 6" (1.68 m)		New Liskeard, Ontario	Toronto Aeros
6		Lacey Eden	Freshman	F	5' 8" (1.73 m)		Annapolis, Maryland	Shattuck St. Mary’s
7		Dara Greig	Sophomore	F	5' 7" (1.7 m)		Lethbridge, Alberta	Pursuit of Excellence
8		Mackenna Webster	Freshman	F	5' 2" (1.57 m)		St. Louis, Missouri	Shattuck St. Mary’s
9		Sophie Shirley	Junior	F	5' 9" (1.75 m)		Saskatoon, Saskatchewan	Calgary Inferno (CWHL)
10		Delaney Drake	Senior	F	5' 7" (1.7 m)		Traverse City, Michigan	North American Hockey Academy (JWHL)
15		Caitlin Schneider (A)	Senior	F	5' 4" (1.63 m)		Glenview, Illinois	Chicago Young Americans
16		Maddie Posick	Senior	F	5' 7" (1.7 m)		Stoughton, Wisconsin	Madison Capitols
17		Britta Curl (A)	Sophomore	F	5' 8" (1.73 m)		Bismarck, North Dakota	Bismarck Blizzard
19		Daryl Watts (C)	Senior	F	5' 6" (1.68 m)		Toronto, Ontario	Boston College (WHEA)
20		Brette Pettet (C)	Senior	F	5' 3" (1.6 m)		Kentville, Nova Scotia	Team Canada U-18
27		Grace Bowlby (C)	Sophomore	F	5' 8" (1.73 m)		Edina, Minnesota	Team USA U-18
28		Maddi Wheeler	Freshman	F	5' 4" (1.63 m)		Erinsville, Ontario	Nepean Jr. Wildcats
30		Cami Kronish	Sophomore (RS)	G	6' 0" (1.83 m)		New York, New York	North American Hockey Academy (JWHL)
29		Kennedy Blair	Senior (RS)	G	5' 7" (1.7 m)		Bismarck, North Dakota	Mercyhurst Lakers (CHA)
32		Breanna Blesi	Junior (RS)	G	5' 7" (1.7 m)		Maple Grove, Minnesota	Maple Grove HS

== Awards and honors ==
- Grace Bowlby, WCHA Defensive Player of the Month (February 2021)
- Grace Bowlby, WCHA Defensive Player of the Week (awarded on March 1, 2021)
- Grace Bowlby, 2020–21 All-USCHO.com Second Team
- Lacey Eden, Hockey Commissioners Association National Rookie of the Month for February
- Lacey Eden, WCHA Rookie of the Month (February 2021)
- Mark Johnston, WCHA Coach of the Year
- Daryl Watts, 2020–21 Preseason WCHA Player of the Year.
- Daryl Watts, WCHA Player of the Year
- Daryl Watts, WCHA scoring champion (31 points)
- Daryl Watts, 2020–21 All-USCHO.com First Team
- Makenna Webster, Most Outstanding Player, 2021 NCAA National Collegiate Women's Ice Hockey Tournament

=== All-America honors ===
- Grace Bowlby, 2020–21 CCM/AHCA First Team All-American
- Daryl Watts, CCM/AHCA 2020–21 First Team All-American

=== HCA Awards ===
- Daryl Watts, Hockey Commissioners Association Women's Player of the Month (March 2021):
- Makenna Webster, Hockey Commissioners Association Women's Rookie of the Month (March 2021)
- Lacey Eden, Hockey Commissioners Association Women's Rookie of the Month (February 2021)
