= Alyona Starovoitova =

Russian ice hockey player

Alyona Starovoitova Алёна Старовойтова
- Born: 22 October 1999 (age 26) Korolyov, Russia
- Height: 173 cm (5 ft 8 in)
- Weight: 67 kg (148 lb; 10 st 8 lb)
- Position: Forward
- Shoots: Left
- ZhHL team Former teams: Torpedo Nizhny Novgorod; SKIF Nizhny Novgorod; Tornado Dmitrov
- National team: Russia
- Playing career: 2016–present
Medal record
Universiade
Gold medal – first place	2019 Krasnoyarsk	Ice hockey

Alyona Mikhailovna Starovoitova (Russian: Алёна Михайловна Старовойтова, romanized: Alyona Mikhaylovna Starovoytova, born 22 October 1999) is a Russian ice hockey player, currently playing in the Zhenskaya Hockey League (ZhHL) with Torpedo Nizhny Novgorod.

== Playing career ==
As a junior player with the Russian national under-18 team, Starovoitova won a bronze medal at the 2017 IIHF U18 Women's World Championship. In the same year, she won the Russian Championship with Tornado Dmitrov.

She played in the women's ice hockey tournament at the 2018 Winter Olympics in Pyeongchang with the Olympic Athletes from Russia team, and won a gold medal while representing Russia in the women's ice hockey tournament at the 2019 Winter Universiade in Krasnoyarsk.

Starovoitova participated in the 2022 ZhHL All-Star Game.
