= Polina Bolgareva =

Russian ice hockey player (born 1999)

Polina Bolgareva Полина Болгарева
- Born: 6 February 1999 (age 27) Balashikha, Moscow Oblast, Russia
- Height: 1.67 m (5 ft 6 in)
- Weight: 65 kg (143 lb; 10 st 3 lb)
- Position: Forward
- Shoots: Right
- ZhHL team Former teams: Dinamo-Neva St. Petersburg; SKIF Nizhny Novgorod
- National team: Russia
- Playing career: 2016–present
Medal record
Women's ice hockey
Representing Russia
U18 World Championships
Bronze medal – third place	2015 United States
Bronze medal – third place	2017 Czech Republic

Polina Pavlovna Bolgareva (Russian: Полина Павловна Болгарева; born 6 February 1999) is a Russian ice hockey forward and member of the Russian national ice hockey team, currently playing in the Zhenskaya Hockey League (ZhHL) with Dinamo-Neva Saint Petersburg.

Bolgareva represented the Russian Olympic Committee (ROC) in the women's ice hockey tournament at the 2022 Winter Olympics in Beijing.

== Playing career ==
At age 17, Bolgareva made her ZhHL debut with SKIF Nizhny Novgorod in the 2016–17 season. After two and a half seasons with SKIF, she signed with Dinamo-Neva Saint Petersburg midway through the 2018–19 season. She is a two-time ZhHL All-Star selection.

=== International play ===
As a junior player with the Russian national under-18 team, Bolgareva participated at the IIHF U18 Women's World Championships in 2014, 2015, 2016, and 2017, winning bronze medals at the 2015 and 2017 tournaments.

She was a member of the Russian Olympic Committee team at the 2022 Winter Olympics and scored a hat-trick against Switzerland in the ROC's opening game of the group stage. After testing positive for COVID-19 following the group stage match against Canada, Bolgareva did not appear in the final game of the group stage against Finland nor the quarterfinal rematch against Switzerland.
