= MEO Arena (Přerov) =

Indoor sporting arena in Přerov, Czech Republic

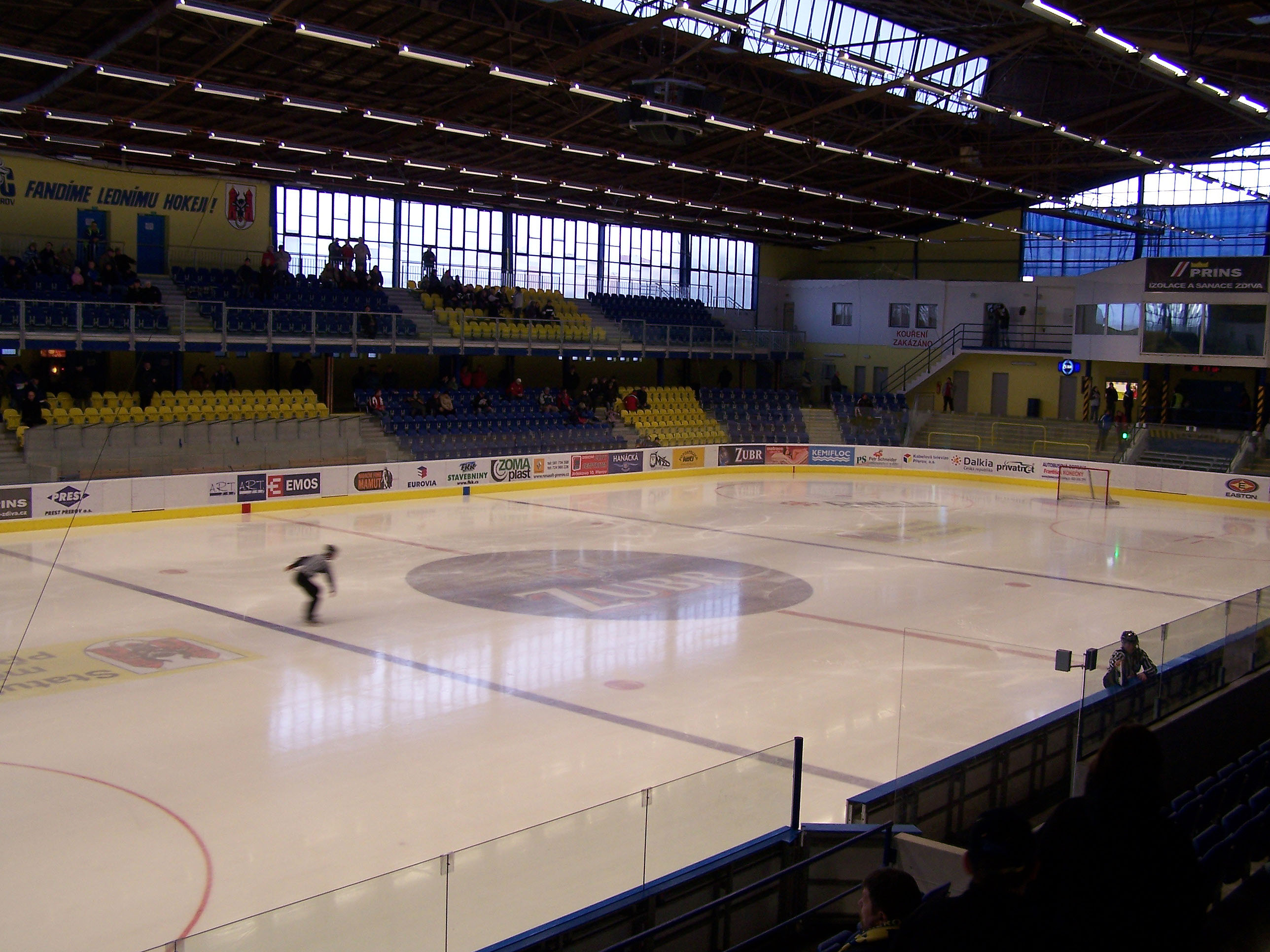
- Interactive map of MEO Arena
- Former names: Maxi-Tip Aréna
- Location: Petřivalského 2885/5, Přerov, Czech Republic 750 02
- Coordinates: 49°26′51.173″N 17°27′53.16″E
- Operator: Sportoviště Přerov, s.r.o.
- Capacity: 1,951

Construction
- Opened: 1971
- Renovated: 1999, 2009

Tenant
- HC Slovan Ústečtí Lvi

MEO Arena is an indoor sporting arena located in Přerov, Czech Republic. The capacity of the arena is 3,000 people, 1,951 of the places are seated. The arena was built in 1969–1971. It is currently home to the HC ZUBR Přerov ice hockey team. The arena was reconstructed in 2009.
