= Paetyn Levis =

American ice hockey player (born 1999)

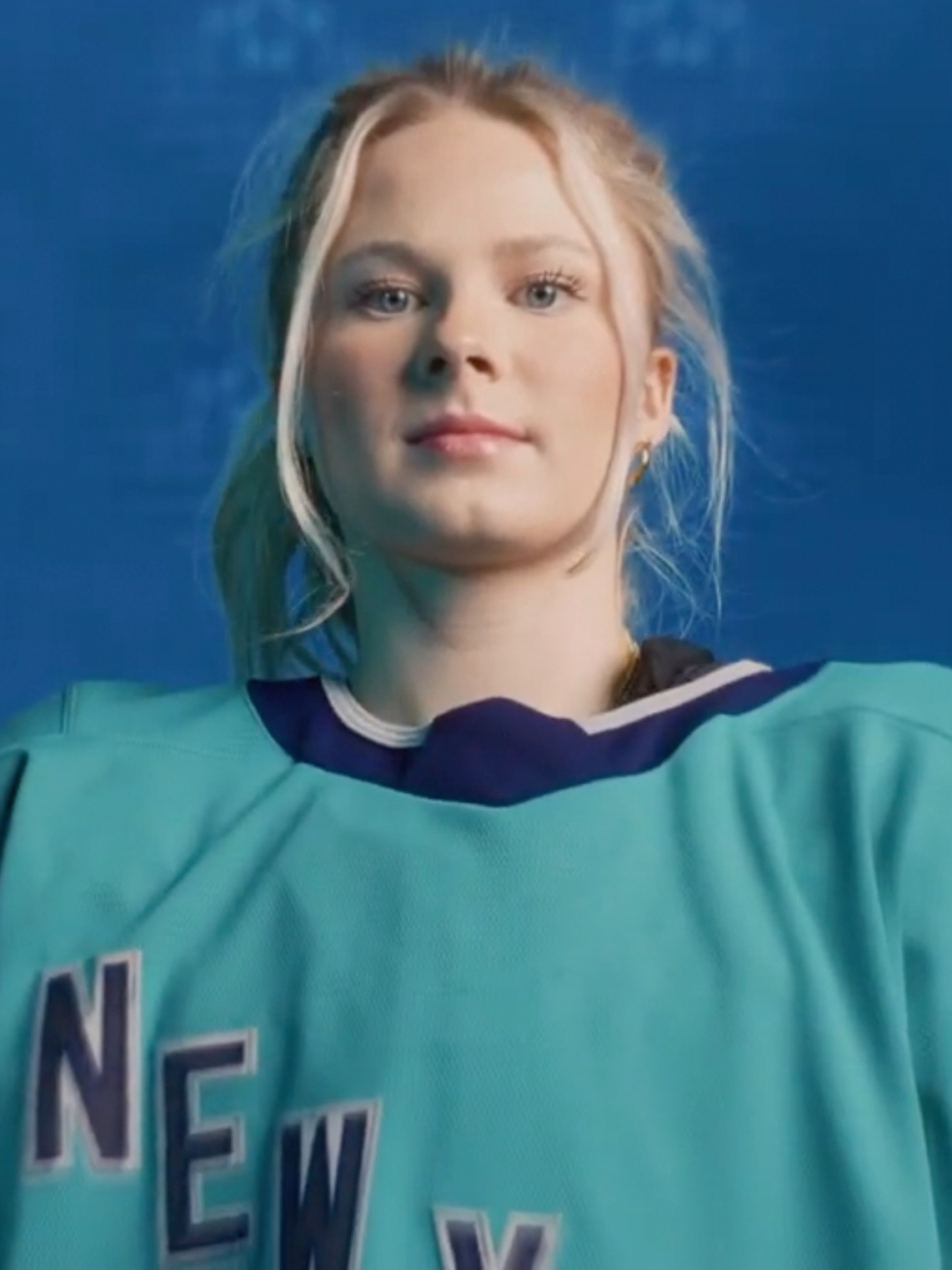
- Levis with PWHL New York in 2024
- Born: November 6, 1999 (age 26) Rogers, Minnesota, U.S.
- Height: 5 ft 5 in (165 cm)
- Position: Forward
- Shoots: Right
- PWHL team: New York Sirens

Paetyn Levis (born November 6, 1999) is an American professional ice hockey player who is a forward for the New York Sirens of the Professional Women's Hockey League (PWHL). She played college ice hockey at Ohio State. She was named Most Outstanding Player at the 2022 NCAA Division I women's ice hockey tournament.

== Early life ==
Levis is the daughter of Charlie and Tarra Levis. She attended Rogers High School in Rogers, Minnesota where she was a three-sport athlete, playing golf, ice hockey and tennis. She played ice hockey for four years, serving as team captain her final three years. She finished her career as Rogers High School all-time leading scorer with 139 goals and 58 assists for 197 total points. She also golfed, helping lead her golf team to its first state tournament appearance in school history, and was named a and three-time all-conference honoree.

== Playing career ==
=== College ===
On October 18, 2016, Levis committed to play college ice hockey at Ohio State. During the 2018–19 season, in her freshman year, she recorded three goals and three assists in 34 games. During the 2019–20 season, in her sophomore year, she recorded two goals and ten assists in 38 games. During the 2020–21 season, in her junior year, she recorded five goals and six assists in 20 games, in a season that was shortened due to the COVID-19 pandemic.

During the 2021–22 season, in her senior year, she recorded 24 goals and 29 assists in 38 games. She led the team in goals, and ranked second on the team with 53 points. On February 25, 2022, Levis scored four goals in a game against St. Cloud State, tying a program record for most goals in a game. She helped lead the Buckeyes to their first NCAA women's ice hockey tournament championship in 2022. During the Frozen Four, she scored goals against Yale and Minnesota Duluth in the national championship game and was subsequently named tournament Most Outstanding Player. During the 2022–23 season, in her graduate student year, she recorded 21 goals and 19 assists in 41 games. She finished her collegiate career with 55 goals and 67 assists in 171 games.

=== Professional ===
On June 26, 2023, Levis signed a two-year contract with the Minnesota Whitecaps of the Premier Hockey Federation (PHF). The PHF ceased operations on June 29, 2023, as a result she never played a game for the Whitecaps.

On September 18, 2023, Levis was drafted in the tenth round, 57th overall, by PWHL New York in the 2023 PWHL Draft. On November 8, 2023, she signed a one-year contract with New York. During the 2023–24 season, she recorded three assists in 24 games. In November 2024, following pre-season mini camp, Levis signed a three-year contract extension with the New York Sirens.

== Career statistics ==
			Regular season					Playoffs
Season	Team	League	GP	G	A	Pts	PIM	GP	G	A	Pts	PIM
2018–19	Ohio State University	WCHA	34	3	3	6	8	—	—	—	—	—
2019–20	Ohio State University	WCHA	38	2	10	12	8	—	—	—	—	—
2020–21	Ohio State University	WCHA	20	5	6	11	2	—	—	—	—	—
2021–22	Ohio State University	WCHA	38	24	29	53	20	—	—	—	—	—
2022–23	Ohio State University	WCHA	41	21	19	40	18	—	—	—	—	—
2023–24	PWHL New York	PWHL	23	0	3	3	4	—	—	—	—	—
2024–25	New York Sirens	PWHL	30	4	4	8	10	—	—	—	—	—
2025–26	New York Sirens	PWHL	30	5	5	10	10	—	—	—	—	—
PWHL totals			83	9	12	21	24	—	—	—	—	—
