= 2020–21 Minnesota Duluth Bulldogs women's ice hockey season =

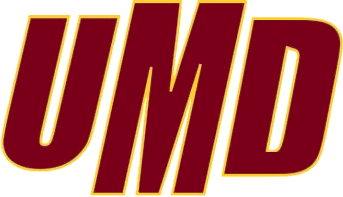

Frozen Four, L, 2-3 (OT) vs Northeastern Huskies
- Conference: WCHA
- Home ice: Amsoil Arena

Record
- Overall: 12-7-0
- Home: 8-4-0
- Road: 3-1-0
- Neutral: 1-2-0

Coaches and captains
- Head coach: Maura Crowell
- Assistant coaches: Laura Bellamy; Ashleigh Brykaliuk; Chris Esposito
- Captain: Ashton Bell
- Minnesota Duluth Bulldogs women's ice hockey seasons « 2019–20 2021–22 »

The Bulldogs qualified for the 2021 NCAA National Collegiate Women's Ice Hockey Tournament, ranked as the #5 seed. Defeating the Colgate Raiders in the opening round, the Bulldogs were defeated 3-2 by the #1 ranked Northeastern Huskies in the Frozen Four.

Emma Soderberg captured the WCHA 2020-21 Goaltending Championship. Statistically, she topped all conference goaltenders with both a 1.34 GAA and .951 save percentage. In addition, she tied for the league lead with five shutouts, while ranking second overall in wins with 11.

In the USCHO.com final season rankings, the Bulldogs claimed the number four spot, its highest spot since 2010, when it placed first overall in the rankings.

== Offseason ==
=== Recruiting ===
Player	Position	Nationality	Notes
Jojo Chobak	Goaltender	United States	Was a participant in the USA Under-18 Top 66 Camp in the summer of 2018
Katie Davis	Forward	United States	Won a gold medal at the 2020 IIHF World Women's U18 Championship
Nina Jobst-Smith	Defense	Canada	Attended Okanagan Hockey Academy; Born in North Vancouver, she has skated for the German National Team
Brieja Parent	Forward	United States	Member of the USA Hockey Girls' 16/17 Players Development Camp

== Regular season ==
=== Standings ===
2020–21 Western Collegiate Hockey Association standings
	Conference								Overall					
	GP	W	L	T	SW	PTS	GF	GA	GP	W	L	T	GF	GA
#1 Wisconsin † *	16	12	3	1	0	36	62	25	21	17	3	1	79	33
#4 Minnesota Duluth	16	11	5	0	0	34	50	23	23	12	7	0	55	33
#3 Ohio State	16	11	5	0	0	32	42	32	20	13	7	0	56	42
#6 Minnesota	19	11	7	0	1	36	62	40	20	11	8	1	65	45
Minnesota State	20	7	12	1	0	20	38	56	20	7	12	1	38	56
St. Cloud State	19	6	12	1	0	18.5	32	62	19	6	12	1	32	62
Bemidji State	20	2	16	2	1	12.5	24	72	20	2	16	2	24	72
Championship: March 8, 2021 † indicates conference regular season champion; * indicates conference tournament champion Rankings: USCHO.com; updated March 25, 2021

=== Schedule ===
Date	Opponent^{#}	Rank^{#}	Site	Decision	Result	Record
Regular Season
November 20	at MSU-Mankato Mavericks		Mayo Clinic Health System Event Center • Mankato, MN	W 5-0	1-0-0 (1-0-0)	
November 21	at MSU-Mankato Mavericks		Mayo Clinic Health System Event Center • Mankato, MN	W 7-3	2-0-0 (2-0-0)	
November 27	Minnesota Golden Gophers		Amsoil Arena • Duluth, MN	L 2-4	2-1-0 (2-1-0)	
November 28	Minnesota Golden Gophers		Amsoil Arena • Duluth, MN	L 1-2	2-2-0 (2-2-0)	
December 4	St. Cloud State Huskies		Amsoil Arena • Duluth, MN	W 4-0	3-2-0 (3-2-0)	
December 5	St. Cloud State Huskies		Amsoil Arena • Duluth, MN	W 5-1	4-2-0 (4-2-0)	
January 15	Ohio State Buckeyes		Amsoil Arena • Duluth, MN	W 2-0	5-2-0 (5-2-0)	
January 16	Ohio State Buckeyes		Amsoil Arena • Duluth, MN	L 0-1	5-3-0 (5-3-0)	
January 22	at Bemidji State Beavers		Bemidji, MN	L 0-1	5-4-0 (5-4-0)	
January 23	at Bemidji State Beavers		Bemidji, MN	W 1-0	6-4-0 (6-4-0)	
January 29	St. Cloud State Huskies		Amsoil Arena • Duluth, MN	W 4-1	7-4-0 (7-4-0)	
January 30	St. Cloud State Huskies		Amsoil Arena • Duluth, MN	W 6-0	8-4-0 (8-4-0)	
February 20	MSU-Mankato Mavericks		Amsoil Arena • Duluth, MN	W 2-1		
February 21	MSU-Mankato Mavericks		Amsoil Arena • Duluth, MN	W 4-3		
February 26	Wisconsin Badgers		Amsoil Arena • Duluth, MN	W 4-2		
February 27	Wisconsin Badgers		Amsoil Arena • Duluth, MN	L 3-4		
NCAA Tournament
March 6	Ohio State Buckeyes		Ridder Arena • Minneapolis, MN	L 2-7		
WCHA Final Faceoff
March 15	vs. Colgate Raiders		Erie Insurance Arena • Erie, PA	Emma Soderberg	W 1-0 ^{OT}	12-6-0
March 18	vs. Northeastern Huskies		Erie Insurance Arena • Erie, PA	Aerin Frankel (NU)	L 3-2 ^{OT}	12-7-0
*Non-conference game. ^{#}Rankings from USCHO.com Poll.

== Roster ==
=== 2020–21 Bulldogs ===
No.	Nat.	Player	Class	Pos	Height	DoB	Hometown	Previous team
1		Hanna Markel	Senior	G	5' 7" (1.7 m)		Dillon, Colorado	Northwood School
6		Lizi Norton	Junior	D	5' 5" (1.65 m)		Orono, Minnesota	USA U18 National Team
7		Kailee Skinner	Junior	D	5' 10" (1.78 m)		Penticton, British Columbia	Okanagan Hockey Academy
8		Monique Aaneson	Senior	F	5' 4" (1.63 m)		Moorhead, Minnesota	North American Hockey Association
9		Naomi Rogge	Junior	F	5' 5" (1.65 m)		Eden Prairie, Minnesota	Eden Prairie HS
10		McKenzie Revering	Senior	D	5' 3" (1.6 m)		Alexandria, Minnesota	Alexandria HS
11		Katie Davis	Freshman	F	5' 2" (1.57 m)		Boise, Idaho	USA U18 National Team
12		Kylie Hanley	Junior	F	5' 8" (1.73 m)		Minnetonka, Minnesota	Hopkins HS
13		Anneke Linser	Junior	F	5' 10" (1.78 m)		Lino Lakes, Minnesota	USA U18 National Team
15		Brieja Parent	Senior	F	5' 4" (1.63 m)		Forest Lake, Minnesota	Forest Lake HS
16		Mannon McMahon	Sophomore	F	5' 7" (1.7 m)		Maple Grove, Minnesota	Maple Grove High School
17		Gabbie Hughes	Junior	D	5' 9" (1.75 m)		Lino Lakes, Minnesota	USA U18 National Team
19		Anna Klein	Senior	F	5' 7" (1.7 m)		Edina, Minnesota	Edina HS
21		Taylor Stewart	Sophomore	D	5' 10" (1.78 m)		Rochester, Minnesota	Shattuck St. Mary’s
23		Kassy Betinol	Sophomore	F	5' 3" (1.6 m)		Okotoks, Alberta	Pursuit of Excellence (PWHL)
24		McKenzie Hewett	Junior	F	5' 6" (1.68 m)		Edmonton, Alberta	St. Albert Slash (PWHL)
25		Clara Van Wieren	Freshman	F	5' 10" (1.78 m)		Cooperstown, New York	USA U18 National Team
26		Ashton Bell	Senior	D	5' 9" (1.75 m)		Deloraine, Manitoba	Canadian U18 National Team
30		Emma Soderberg	Freshman	G	5' 7" (1.7 m)		Jarved, Sweden	Swedish U18 National Team
35		Jojo Chobak	Freshman	G	5' 8" (1.73 m)		Chicago, Illinois	Chicago Young Americans

== Awards and honors ==
- Ashton Bell, 2020-21 WCHA Defenseman of the Year
- Ashton Bell, 2020-21 WCHA First Team All-Star
- Emma Soderberg, 2020-21 WCHA Goaltender of the Year
- Emma Soderberg, 2020-21 WCHA First Team All-Star
- Gabbie Hughes, 2020-21 WCHA Second Team All-Star
- Anna Klein, 2020-21 WCHA Second Team All-Star
- Anna Klein, All-USCHO.com Third Team

=== All-America honors ===
- Emma Soderberg, 2020-21 Second Team CCM/AHCA All-American
- Ashton Bell, 2020-21 Second Team CCM/AHCA All-American
