= Brette Pettet =

Canadian ice hockey player

- Born: January 14, 1999 (age 27) Kentville, Nova Scotia, Canada
- Height: 160 cm (5 ft 3 in)
- Position: Forward
- Shoots: Right
- SDHL team Former teams: Djurgårdens IF; Wisconsin Badgers
- Playing career: 2017–present

Brette Pettet (born January 14, 1999) is a Canadian ice hockey forward, currently playing in the Swedish Women's Hockey League (SDHL) with Djurgårdens IF. Her college ice hockey career was played with the Wisconsin Badgers in the Western Collegiate Hockey Association (WCHA) conference of the NCAA Division I.

== Career ==
Pettet grew up playing on boys' teams in the Acadia Minor Hockey Association up until the Peewee AAA level, where she was coached by former NHLer Dennis Vial. When she was 12, she moved to the United States to attend the Shattuck-Saint Mary's prep school, winning four championships during her time there.

In 2017, she began attending the University of Wisconsin, playing for the university's women's ice hockey programme. She scored 19 points in 38 games in her rookie NCAA season, scoring her first collegiate hat trick against Mercyhurst in late September 2017. Her point production dropped during the 2018–19 season, down to six points, but the Badgers won the national championship. She then posted career-high marks during the 2019–20 season, scoring 28 points in 36 games, including the opening goal of the Badgers' season. She was named a co-captain of the team for the 2020–21 season, her last year of collegiate eligibility.

== International career ==
Pettet represented Canada at the 2017 IIHF World Women's U18 Championship in Czechia, the only player from the Maritimes selected to the Canadian roster that year. She scored five points in five games at the Championships, second on her team in scoring as the country won silver.

== Personal life ==
Pettet studied engineering at the University of Wisconsin.
