= Lauren Bench =

American ice hockey player (born 1997)

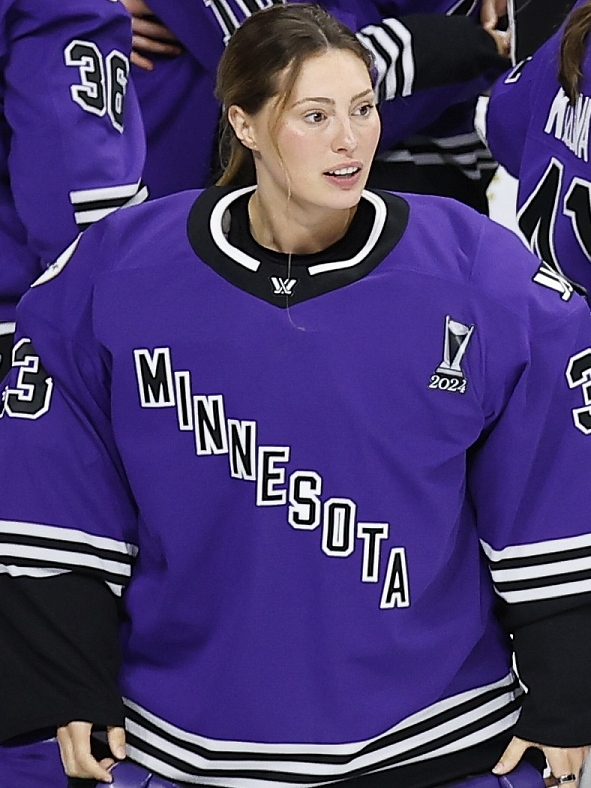
- Bench with PWHL Minnesota in 2024
- Born: November 21, 1997 (age 28) Eagan, Minnesota, U.S.
- Height: 5 ft 10 in (178 cm)
- Position: Goaltender
- Catches: Left
- PWHL team Former teams: Minnesota Frost; MoDo Hockey
- Playing career: 2017–present

Lauren Bench (born November 21, 1997) is an American professional ice hockey goaltender for the Minnesota Frost of the Professional Women's Hockey League (PWHL). She previously played for MoDo Hockey of the Swedish Women's Hockey League (SDHL). She played college ice hockey at Bemidji State and Minnesota.

== Early life ==
Bench attended Burnsville High School in Burnsville, Minnesota, where she was a four-sport letterwinner for the Blaze, earning five varsity letters in hockey, three in softball, two in golf, and one in alpine skiing.

== College career ==
Bench began her collegiate career for Bemidji State during the 2017–18 season. During her redshirt freshman year, she appeared in 19 games for the Beavers and posted an 8–9–0 record, with a 2.71 goals against average (GAA) and .903 save percentage with two shutouts. During the 2018–19 season in her redshirt sophomore year, she appeared in 23 games and posted a 9–11–2 record, with a 2.51 GAA and .909 save percentage. She set Bemidji State's longest shutout streak of 165:55 after not allowing a goal in eight-consecutive periods. Following the season she was named to the All-WCHA Third Team.

During the 2019–20 season in her redshirt junior year, she started 31 games and posted a 13–16–2 record, with a 2.25 GAA and .919 save percentage. Her 13 wins tied for the third most wins in a single season in program history, while she posted the sixth best GAA and seventh best save percentage in a single season. On February 29, 2020, she set a program and WCHA single-game record with 70 saves in a game against Minnesota Duluth.

On April 9, 2020, Bench announced she would transfer to Minnesota to pursue a master's degree in Sport and Exercise Science. She graduated summa cum laude with a Bachelor of Science in chemistry with an emphasis in biochemistry/biotechnology and a minor in biology from Bemidji State University. She finished her career at Bemidji State with a 30–36–4 record, with a 2.45 GAA, .912 save percentage and 10 shutouts. She ranked fifth in program history with 73 games played, fourth in career wins (30), fifth in career minutes played (4,266:00), third in career shutouts (10), fourth in career goals against average (2.45), tied for fourth in career save percentage (.912) and fifth in career saves (1,794).

During the 2020–21 season in her redshirt senior year, she appeared in 15 games and posted a 9–6–0 record, with a 2.26 GAA and .920 save percentage in a season that was shortened due to the COVID-19 pandemic. She ranked third in the WCHA in save percentage and fourth in GAA. She led the Gophers to a 3–1–0 record during the month of November. She made 126 saves on 131 shots faced and her three wins led all goaltenders nationally, while her 1.26 GAA was third in the nation, and her .962 save percentage ranked fourth. She was subsequently named the Hockey Commissioners Association national goaltender of the month and WCHA goaltender of the month for the month of November 2020. On June 17, 2021, Bench announced she would use her extra year of eligibility due to the COVID-19 pandemic and return to Minnesota for the 2021–22 season. During her fifth and final year, she appeared in 26 games and posted a 14–6–1 record, with a 1.98 GAA, .919 save percentage and three shutouts. She led the team in wins, saves (491), and shutouts and ranked fourth in the WCHA in wins and fifth in conference GAA (1.98). She finished her career tenth in Minnesota program history in saves (838) and second in program history in saves per game (22.05).

== Professional career ==
After graduating, Bench joined MoDo Hockey of the SDHL. During the 2022–23 season, in her first professional season, she appeared in 26 games and posted a 14–12–0 record, with a 2.29 GAA and a .919 save percentage. On June 23, 2023, Bench signed a one-year contract with the Montreal Force of the Premier Hockey Federation (PHF). The PHF ceased operations on June 29, 2023, as a result she never played a game for the Force.

On December 12, 2023, Bench signed a reserve player contract with PWHL Minnesota for the 2023–24 season, where she was the team's fourth goaltender. On February 14, 2024, she was signed to a standard player agreement contract with Minnesota. She didn't appear in a game for Minnesota during the season and won the inaugural Walter Cup.

== Career statistics ==
Note: GP = Games played; Min, TOI = Minutes played; W = Wins; L = Losses; T,T/OT = Ties; OTL = Overtime losses; GA = Goals-against; GAA = Goals-against average; SO = Shutouts; SV% = Save percentage;

			Regular season									Playoffs
Season	Team	League	GP	W	L	T/OT	MIN	GA	SO	GAA	SV%	GP	W	L	MIN	GA	SO	GAA	SV%
2017–18	Bemidji State Beavers	WCHA	19	8	9	0	1063	48	2	2.71	.903	—	—	—	—	—	—	—	—
2018–19	Bemidji State Beavers	WCHA	23	9	11	2	1336	56	4	2.51	.909	—	—	—	—	—	—	—	—
2019–20	Bemidji State Beavers	WCHA	31	13	16	2	1863	70	4	2.25	.919	—	—	—	—	—	—	—	—
2020–21	Minnesota Golden Gophers	WCHA	15	9	5	0	797	30	2	2.26	.920	—	—	—	—	—	—	—	—
2021–22	Minnesota Golden Gophers	WCHA	26	14	6	1	1305	43	3	1.98	.919	—	—	—	—	—	—	—	—
2022–23	MoDo Hockey	SDHL	26	14	12	0	1521	58	3	2.29	.919	5	2	3	297	15	1	3.03	.898
2023–24	PWHL Minnesota	PWHL	0	0	0	0	0	0	0	0.00	.000	—	—	—	—	—	—	—	—
NCAA totals			111	45	16	28	5305	199	13	2.25	.917	—	—	—	—	—	—	—	—
SDHL totals			26	14	12	0	1521	58	3	2.29	.919	5	2	3	297	15	1	3.03	.898
PWHL totals			0	0	0	0	0	0	0	0.00	.000	—	—	—	—	—	—	—	—
