= Amy Potomak =

Canadian ice hockey player

- Born: June 25, 1999 (age 27) Aldergrove, British Columbia, Canada
- Height: 5 ft 9 in (175 cm)
- Position: Forward
- Shoots: Right
- Played for: Trinity Western Spartans; Minnesota Golden Gophers; Pacific Steelers
- Playing career: 2015–present

Amy Potomak (born June 25, 1999) is a Canadian ice hockey player. She played college ice hockey with the Minnesota Golden Gophers women's ice hockey program from 2018 to 2022, and with the Trinity Western Spartans women's ice hockey program during the 2022–23 season.

== Playing career ==
At the 2014 British Columbia Winter Games, Potomak emerged with the gold medal. At the 2014 Stoney Creek Jr. Showcase, she was the event's leading scorer. She was a member of Team BC's women's ice hockey team at the 2015 Canada Winter Games. Team BC finished the event in sixth place.

On November 24, 2016, it was announced that Potomak would affiliate with the Valley West Hawks, a U18 AAA boys' team from the BC Major Midget League. She was the third female player and first forward in league history to affiliate with a boys' team, following in the footsteps of defenceman Kaleigh Fratkin, who played with the Vancouver North West Giants during the 2009–10 season, and goaltender Kimberly Newell, who played with the Kootenay Ice during the 2011–12 season.

=== Hockey Canada ===
Medal record

Women's ice hockey

Representing Canada

World U18 Championship
Silver medal – second place	2016 Canada	
Silver medal – second place	2017 Czechia	

As a junior ice hockey player, Potomak was a member of the Canadian national under-18 team and participated in two IIHF U18 Women's World Championships, winning silver medals in both 2016 and 2017. At the 2017 tournament, she scored the game winning goal against Russia in the preliminary round and was selected as a top-three player for Canada by the coaches.

She made her debut with the senior national team at age 17, appearing in a pair of contests against the United States during December 2016 in Plymouth, Michigan, U.S. and Sarnia, Ontario, Canada.

In August 2017, Potomak was one of 28 players chosen by Hockey Canada for the Canadian national team centralized roster ahead of the 2018 Winter Olympics. Having turned 18 only two months prior, she was the youngest player selected for centralization and had to delay her freshman year at the University of Minnesota in order to participate. In mid-November 2017, she and defenceman Erin Ambrose were the first players to be released from the centralized roster.

== Personal life ==
Potomak is the youngest of six siblings, all of whom played ice hockey during their youths. Her only sister, Sarah (born 1997), is a two-time IIHF Women's World Championship medalist with the Canadian national team and won the National Collegiate Women's Ice Hockey Championship with the Minnesota Golden Gophers in 2016. Sarah and Amy played together with Team British Columbia at the 2013 Canadian U18 nationals and they were the first sister duo to play on the Canadian national ice hockey team together.

Potomak has a bachelor's degree in kinesiology from the University of Minnesota.

== Awards and honours ==
- National Women's Under-18 Championship Most Valuable Player – 2015, 2016
- WCHA Rookie of the Month – December 2018
- WCHA Rookie of the Week – week of 19 February 2019, week of 26 February 2019
- Thomas R. Seha Women's Hockey Scholarship (University of Minnesota) – 2018–19, 2019–20
- Minnesota Golden Gophers Women's Hockey Letterwinner – 2018–19, 2019–20, 2020–21, 2021–22
- WCHA All-Academic Team – 2019–20, 2020–21, 2021–22
- Academic All-Big Ten – 2019–20, 2020–21, 2021–22
- Canada West Second Team All-Star – 2022–23
