= Megan Keller =

American ice hockey player (born 1996)

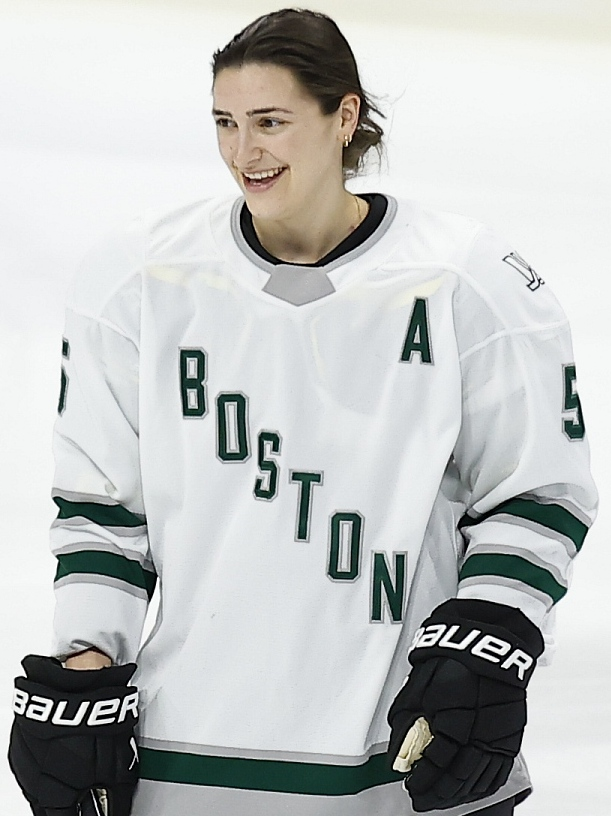
- Keller with PWHL Boston in 2024
- Born: May 1, 1996 (age 30) Farmington Hills, Michigan, U.S.
- Height: 5 ft 11 in (180 cm)
- Weight: 165 lb (75 kg; 11 st 11 lb)
- Position: Defence
- Shoots: Left
- PWHL team: Boston Fleet
- National team: United States
- Playing career: 2014–present

Megan Lynn Keller (born May 1, 1996) is an American professional ice hockey player who is a defender and captain for the Boston Fleet of the Professional Women's Hockey League (PWHL). She is a member of the United States women's national ice hockey team, with whom she won gold medals at the 2018 and 2026 Winter Olympics. Keller scored the golden goal in the gold medal match of the 2026 tournament. She also won a silver medal at the 2022 Winter Olympics. Keller is a six-time World Champion, winning gold medals in 2015, 2016, 2017, 2019, 2023, and 2025.

Keller played college ice hockey for the Boston College Eagles from 2014 to 2019, emerging as one of the most dominant defensemen in NCAA history. She led the nation in defenseman scoring in her sophomore, junior, and senior seasons, and became the only defenseman to win the Cammi Granato Award as Hockey East Player of the Year twice (2017, 2019). She was a three-time AHCA All-American First Team selection and a three-time Patty Kazmaier Award Top-10 finalist, including a Top-3 finish in 2019—making her only the second defenseman in history with three Top-10 finishes. Keller finished her collegiate career as Boston College's all-time leader in defenseman scoring with 158 points.

Following college, Keller was a founding member of the Professional Women's Hockey Players Association (PWHPA) in 2019, where she served as a team captain and was named a PWHPA All-Star. In 2023, she signed with PWHL Boston (later named the Boston Fleet) as one of the franchise's first three players alongside Hilary Knight and Aerin Frankel. She served as alternate captain during the inaugural 2023–24 season and was named a PWHL Defender of the Year finalist and Second Team All-Star. In November 2025, Keller was named the second captain in Boston Fleet history.

== Early life ==
Keller was born on May 1, 1996, in Farmington Hills, Michigan, a suburb of Detroit. Her parents are Lynn and Greg Keller, Keller began skating at age three and started playing hockey at age five. She was inspired to pursue hockey by watching her brother Ryan play, and begged her parents to sign her up for the sport. Keller recalled that she initially refused to take skating lessons unless she could wear full hockey gear. Growing up, Keller was inspired to pursue Olympic hockey after watching Katie King-Crowley and Courtney Kennedy compete in the Olympics on television.

- Megan Keller: 2022 Olympic Introduction, USA Hockey

Keller attended North Farmington High School, where she played hockey all four years and earned scholar-athlete honors in ice hockey, softball, and basketball. She graduated in 2014. Her father later remarked that Keller had a stencil above her bed that read "Dream until your dreams come true," reflecting her lifelong passion for pursuing Olympic hockey.

Keller played recreational hockey with boys' teams in Farmington through the peewee level before switching to girls' hockey with the HoneyBaked AAA program. She also played for the Farmington Hills Fire and Livonia Knights youth hockey organizations. With HoneyBaked's U16 team, Keller won the USA Hockey Tier I national championship in 2011. Her U19 team reached the national semifinals in 2013.

== Playing career ==
=== Collegiate ===
Keller played for the Boston College Eagles hockey team from 2014 to 2017, and returned for her senior season in 2018–19 after taking a year off for the 2018 Winter Olympics. As a freshman, Keller made an immediate impact, appearing in all games and earning a spot on the Hockey East All-Star First Team. She recorded 25 points on 6 goals and 19 assists, helping the Eagles reach the NCAA Women's Ice Hockey Tournament. During a game against Northeastern on January 11, 2015, she recorded a career-high three points (one goal, two assists) in a 7–3 victory, earning Hockey East Rookie of the Week honors.

As a sophomore, Keller established herself as one of the nation's top defenders. She appeared in all 41 games and set the Boston College record for single-season points by a defenseman with 52 points on 12 goals and 40 assists, breaking Emily Pfalzer's previous record of 42 points. Her 40 assists not only led all BC defensemen for a season but also set the record for most assists by a BC sophomore, and ranked third nationally among all skaters. Keller led the nation in plus-minus with a +64 rating, which also established a new single-season program record. She led all defensemen in scoring nationally in both points and points per game (1.27), and was second nationally in power-play points (20) and power-play assists (16). Keller set Hockey East records for defenseman points (29) and defenseman assists (24) in a conference season. For her performance, Keller was named an AHCA All-America First Team selection, a Patty Kazmaier Award Top-10 Finalist, and a unanimous selection to the Hockey East All-Star First Team, earning the Hockey East Best Defenseman award. She was also named to the NCAA All-Tournament Team after recording four assists in the Eagles' three NCAA Tournament games. Defensively, she helped Boston College post 14 shutouts and a 1.24 goals against average.

- Megan Keller - Hockey East Player of the Year, Boston College Athletics

Keller's junior season established her as a dominant player in college hockey. She appeared in 35 games and led all NCAA Division I defensemen with 39 points and 29 assists. She became the first-ever defenseman to win the Cammi Granato Award as the Hockey East Player of the Year. Keller earned her second consecutive AHCA All-America First Team honor and was named a Patty Kazmaier Award Top-10 Finalist for the second straight year. She was a unanimous selection to the Hockey East All-Star First Team and won her second consecutive Hockey East Best Defenseman Award. She served as an assistant captain for the Eagles during this season. Following the season, Keller took a leave of absence from Boston College to train with the U.S. National Team in preparation for the 2018 Winter Olympics.

Keller returned to Boston College for her senior season after winning Olympic gold in PyeongChang. She was named one of three team captains alongside Kali Flanagan and Makenna Newkirk. In 38 games, Keller recorded a career-high 43 points on 19 goals and 24 assists, once again leading the nation in defenseman scoring. She won the Cammi Granato Award for the second time, becoming the only defenseman ever to win the award twice. She was named a Patty Kazmaier Award Top-3 Finalist, becoming only the second defenseman ever to be a three-time Top-10 finalist for the award. Keller earned her third consecutive AHCA All-America First Team selection, making her the first player in Boston College history to achieve this honor. She was a unanimous selection to the Hockey East All-Star First Team for the fourth time and won her third Hockey East Best Defenseman Award. In January 2019, she was named Hockey East Player of the Month after recording 12 points (5 goals, 7 assists) and setting the Hockey East single-season points record for a defenseman.

Keller graduated in 2019 as Boston College's all-time leader in defenseman scoring with 158 career points on 45 goals and 113 assists. She ranked sixth overall in program history in points, fourth in assists, and third in plus-minus (+177). She led the nation in defenseman scoring in her sophomore, junior, and senior seasons, and was the fastest defenseman in program history to reach 50 points (60 games), 75 points (77 games), and 100 points (102 games). Keller finished her collegiate career as a four-time Hockey East All-Star First Team selection, three-time Hockey East Best Defenseman, three-time AHCA All-America First Team selection (the first in BC history), three-time Patty Kazmaier Award finalist, and two-time Cammi Granato Award winner—the only defenseman to ever win the award.

=== Professional ===
==== Professional Women's Hockey Players Association (2019–2023) ====
Following her graduation from Boston College in 2019, Keller joined the Professional Women's Hockey Players Association (PWHPA), a nonprofit organization founded in May 2019 in the wake of the Canadian Women's Hockey League's dissolution. The PWHPA was established by over 200 prominent women's players, including members of the Canadian and American national teams, with the goal of creating a unified, financially sustainable professional women's hockey league in North America. PWHPA members, dissatisfied with existing professional options, organized a boycott of the National Women's Hockey League (later renamed the Premier Hockey Federation) and committed to working toward establishing a new league with better player compensation, benefits, and working conditions.

From 2019 to 2023, the PWHPA organized the Dream Gap Tour, a series of exhibition showcases held across North America to maintain player development, generate support for their cause, and raise awareness of the "dream gap"—the disparity in professional opportunities between men's and women's hockey. Keller competed in Dream Gap Tour events for four seasons, playing primarily for the New Hampshire regional hub, also known as Team New England and later Team New Hampshire, before joining Team Scotiabank for the 2022–23 season.

External videos
- Making History at The Garden: PWHPA Secret Dream Gap Tour, New York Rangers

During the 2019–20 season, Keller served as a team captain for a Dream Gap Tour showcase held in Voorhees, New Jersey, in February 2020, leading Team Keller in games against teams captained by Brianna Decker, Sarah Nurse, and Blayre Turnbull. She also participated in showcases in Toronto, Chicago, and other cities throughout the inaugural PWHPA season.

In the 2020–21 season, Keller played for Team Women's Sports Foundation (Team WSF), the sponsored name for the New Hampshire hub. She formed a formidable defensive pairing with former Boston College teammate Kali Flanagan, with the duo serving as the team's top pairing throughout the Dream Gap Tour and logging heavy minutes in all situations. Keller was also selected for the PWHPA All-Star team that competed against United States Premier Hockey League teams in Tampa, Florida, in February 2021 as preparation for the Dream Gap Tour showcase at Madison Square Garden.

During the 2022–23 season, Keller played for Team Scotiabank and was featured among the highlighted players for PWHPA showcases, including the March 2023 event at MedStar Capitals Iceplex. In her final PWHPA season, Keller finished among the top three defenders in scoring. In May 2022, the PWHPA signed a letter of intent with Billie Jean King Enterprises and the Mark Walter Group to explore launching a professional league. In February 2023, the PWHPA organized a formal labor union—the Professional Women's Hockey League Players Association (PWHLPA)—to negotiate a collective bargaining agreement (CBA) for the new league. In June 2023, the Mark Walter Group acquired the Premier Hockey Federation, and the PWHL was officially announced in August 2023 with plans to begin play in January 2024.

==== Boston Fleet (2023–present) ====
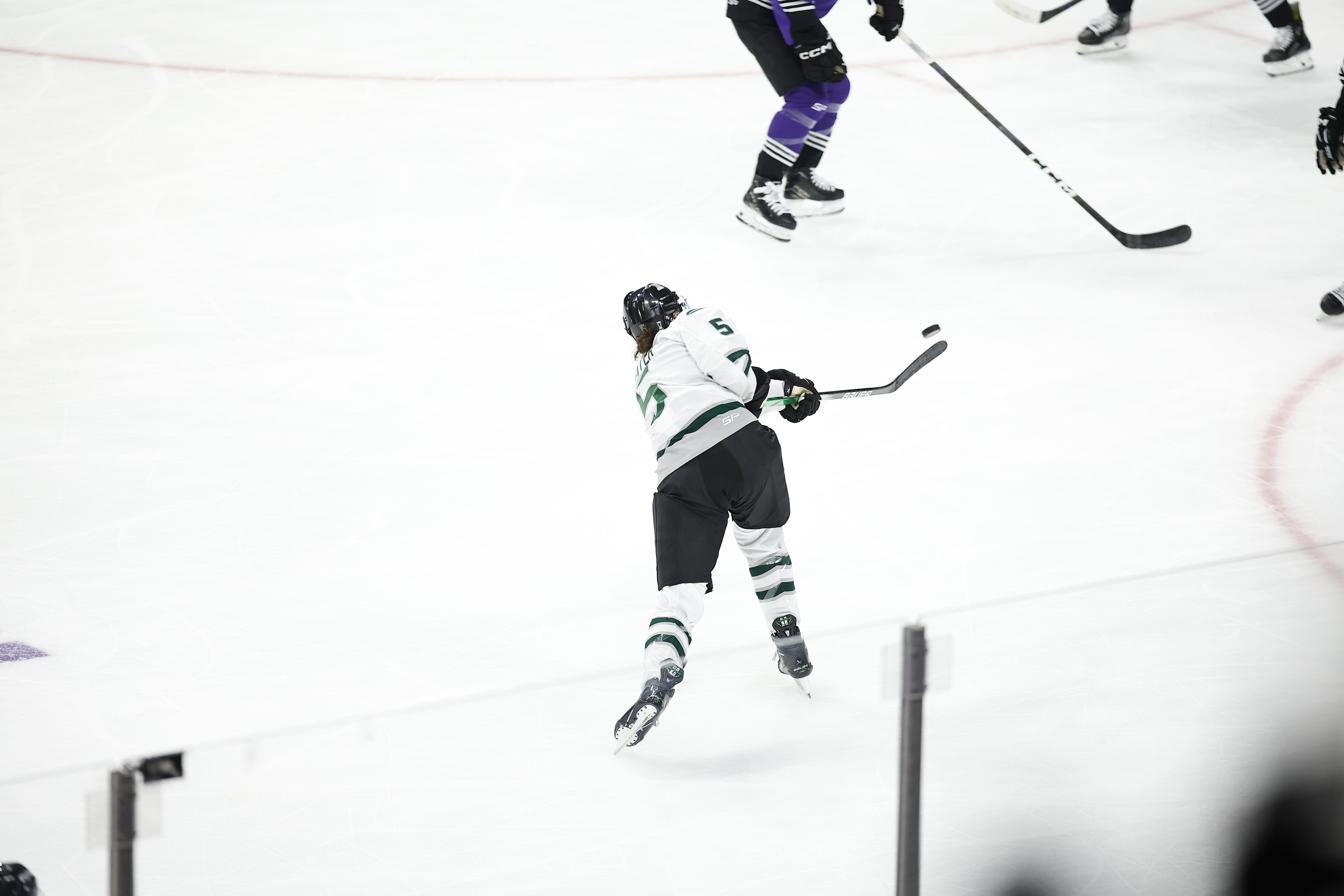
Keller playing for Boston Fleet, 2024

On September 7, 2023, Keller signed a three-year contract with PWHL Boston, becoming one of the franchise's first three signings alongside Hilary Knight and Aerin Frankel. She was named an alternate captain for the inaugural season, serving alongside Jamie Lee Rattray under captain Knight. During the regular season, Keller appeared in all 24 games, recording 4 goals and 11 assists for 15 points. She ranked third among all PWHL defenders in scoring and possessed the highest plus-minus ranking among league defenders at +9, while averaging 25:22 minutes of ice time per game. Boston finished third in the league standings and advanced to the Walter Cup Finals, where they fell to PWHL Minnesota in five games. Keller appeared in all 8 playoff games, recording 4 assists. For her performance, Keller was named a finalist for the PWHL Defender of the Year award and was selected to the Second Team All-Star in the PWHL's inaugural season.

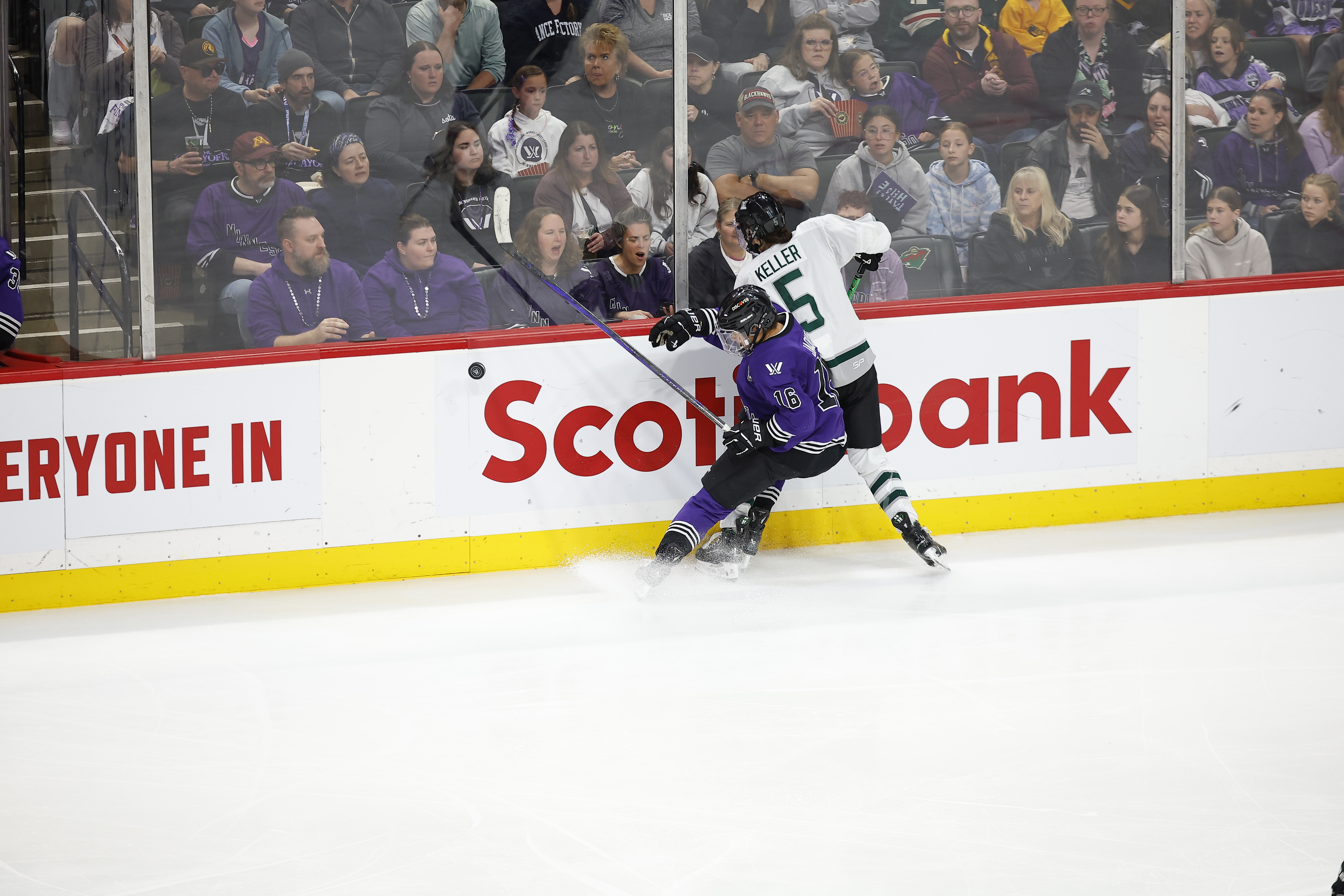
Keller playing for Boston during the 2024 Walter Cup Finals

Keller continued as an alternate captain for the 2024–25 season, appearing in all 30 regular season games. She recorded 5 goals and 8 assists for 13 points, with her offensive production ranking sixth among all PWHL defenders. She finished second in the league in overall time on ice, demonstrating her importance to the team at both ends of the ice. On August 4, 2025, Keller signed a two-year contract extension with the Boston Fleet (the team's new name as of the 2024–25 season), keeping her with the franchise through the 2027–28 season. Following the departure of Hilary Knight to the expansion Seattle Torrent, Keller was named the second captain in Fleet history on November 15, 2025.

In her first game as captain in the 2025–26 season, Keller scored a power play goal in the Fleet's 2–0 season-opening victory over the Montreal Victoire on November 23, 2025. The goal marked only the second power play goal of her PWHL career and was the first power play goal of the 2025–26 season league-wide. Keller's strong start as captain helped the Fleet to an undefeated 4–0–0–0 record through their first four games. In the Fleet's fourth game, a 4–1 victory over the two-time defending champion Minnesota Frost on December 7, Keller recorded a goal and an assist, scoring just 1:14 after Shay Maloney's opening goal with assists from Alina Müller and Haley Winn. She later assisted on Abby Newhook's power play goal alongside Winn. In December 2025, Keller became the first defender to reach three goals in the season and the first skater to produce a four-game point streak when she scored against the Seattle Torrent on December 21. Through seven games of the season, Keller led the Fleet in scoring with seven points (3G-4A) and averaged over 28 minutes of ice time per game through her first two contests—leading Boston's blue line in scoring and ranking tied for second among all PWHL defenders. Her strong November performance earned her recognition as one of the league's PWHL Starting Six for the month, alongside teammates Susanna Tapani and Aerin Frankel. Keller partnered with second overall draft pick Haley Winn on Boston's top defensive pair, with Winn leading all PWHL skaters in average time-on-ice at 26:32 minutes per game.

== International play ==
Medal record

Women's ice hockey

Representing the United States

Winter Olympics
Gold medal – first place	2018 Pyeongchang	Team
Gold medal – first place	2026 Milano Cortina	Team
Silver medal – second place	2022 Beijing	Team

World Championships
Gold medal – first place	2015 Sweden	
Gold medal – first place	2016 Canada	
Gold medal – first place	2017 United States	
Gold medal – first place	2019 Finland	
Gold medal – first place	2023 Canada	
Gold medal – first place	2025 Czechia	
Gold medal – first place	2026 Denmark	
Silver medal – second place	2021 Canada	
Silver medal – second place	2022 Denmark	
Silver medal – second place	2024 United States	

World U18 Championships
Silver medal – second place	2014 Hungary	

=== Junior ===
Keller began her international career with USA Hockey at the U18 level in 2013. At the 2014 IIHF World Women's U18 Championship, she led all skaters with a plus/minus rating of +9, earning a silver medal with the United States.

=== Senior ===
==== World Championships ====
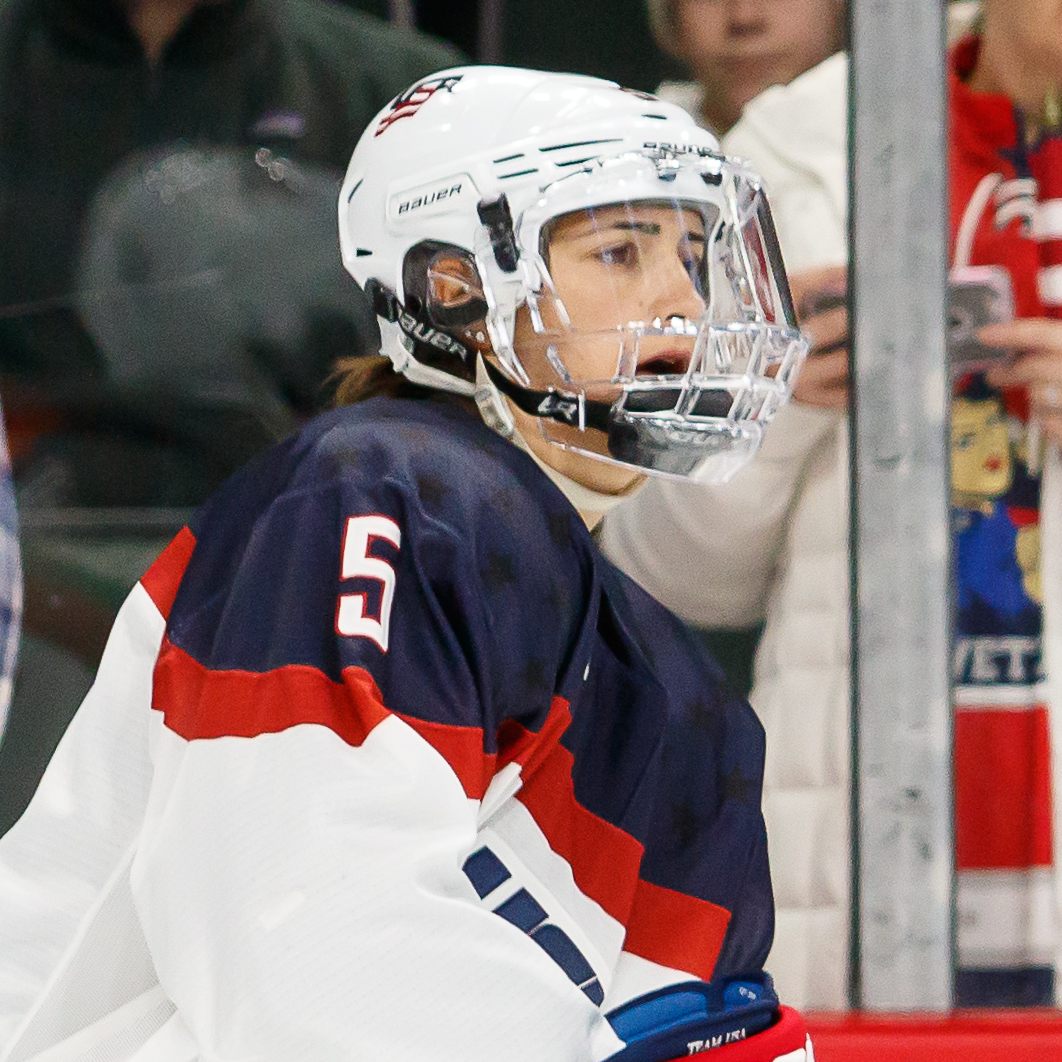
Keller playing for Team USA in 2017

As of 2025, Keller has won six World Championship gold medals (2015, 2016, 2017, 2019, 2023, 2025) and three silver medals (2021, 2022, 2024). She made her senior international debut at the 2015 IIHF Women's World Championship in Malmö, Sweden, where she contributed 5 points in 4 games, including a goal against Canada in the gold medal game, as a member of the gold medal-winning team. She won her second consecutive World Championship gold medal at the 2016 IIHF Women's World Championship in Kamloops, British Columbia, where the United States defeated Canada 1–0 in overtime. She continued her championship success at the 2017 IIHF Women's World Championship in Plymouth, Michigan, capturing a third consecutive gold medal.

In 2019, Keller was part of the U.S. team that won its fifth consecutive World Championship gold medal at the 2019 IIHF Women's World Championship in Espoo, Finland, defeating the host Finns 2–1 in a shootout in the gold medal game. After a silver medal finish at the 2022 IIHF Women's World Championship, Keller returned to the top of the podium at the 2023 IIHF Women's World Championship in Brampton, Ontario, where she scored in the opening game against Japan and helped the United States defeat Canada 6–3 in the gold medal game to claim the team's tenth world championship title.

==== Olympic Games ====
Keller was named to the 2018 U.S. Olympic Team on January 1, 2018. At the PyeongChang 2018 Olympic Winter Games, she played a crucial role for Team USA, leading all U.S. players with 152 shifts in five games and ranking second among all players with 108:40 of ice time, averaging 21:44 per game. In the gold medal game against Canada, Keller led the U.S. with 29:05 of ice time, including 7:14 in the 20-minute overtime period, as the United States won 3–2 in a shootout to capture its first Olympic gold medal in women's hockey in 20 years.

Keller was named to Team USA's roster for the Beijing 2022 Olympic Winter Games on January 2, 2022. In the gold medal game, Keller led the U.S. team with 29:17 of ice time as the United States fell to Canada 3–2, earning a silver medal.

On January 2, 2026, Keller was named to team USA's roster for the 2026 Winter Olympics in Italy. In the quarterfinals of the 2026 Olympics, Keller registered a goal and an assist as the U.S. eliminated host nation Italy in a 6-0 win. It marked the first time that the U.S. and Italy played each other in international ice hockey, including at the Winter Olympics or World Championship. On February 19, Keller scored the "golden goal" in overtime to secure gold for the U.S. defeating archrival Canada 2–1 after trailing 1–0 for the majority of the game. The U.S. entered the final having allowed only one goal across its first six games of the tournament. The U.S. performance tied the 2006 and 2010 Canada teams for the fewest goals allowed in a single Olympics tournament.

==== Four Nations Cup ====
Keller was a member of the U.S. teams that won three consecutive 4 Nations Cup championships from 2016 to 2018. At the 2016 4 Nations Cup in Vierumaki, Finland, she was one of six Boston College products on the roster as the United States defeated Canada 5–3 in the championship game. At the 2017 Four Nations Cup, Keller recorded three assists as the U.S. successfully defended its title.

== Career statistics ==
=== Regular season and playoffs ===
			Regular season					Playoffs
Season	Team	League	GP	G	A	Pts	PIM	GP	G	A	Pts	PIM
2014–15	Boston College	HE	31	4	18	22	28	—	—	—	—	—
2015–16	Boston College	HE	41	12	40	52	21	—	—	—	—	—
2016–17	Boston College	HE	35	10	29	39	58	—	—	—	—	—
2018–19	Boston College	HE	38	19	24	43	38	—	—	—	—	—
2023–24	PWHL Boston	PWHL	24	4	11	15	12	8	0	4	4	10
2024–25	Boston Fleet	PWHL	30	5	8	13	18	—	—	—	—	—
2025–26	Boston Fleet	PWHL	30	7	15	22	8	4	2	0	2	2
PWHL totals			84	16	34	50	14	12	2	4	6	12

=== International ===
Year	Team	Event	Result	GP	G	A	Pts	PIM
2014	United States	U18	2nd place, silver medalist(s)	5	1	2	3	6
2015	United States	WC	1st place, gold medalist(s)	4	2	3	5	2
2016	United States	WC	1st place, gold medalist(s)	4	1	0	1	2
2017	United States	WC	1st place, gold medalist(s)	5	1	2	3	2
2018	United States	OG	1st place, gold medalist(s)	5	0	2	2	4
2019	United States	WC	1st place, gold medalist(s)	7	2	4	6	2
2021	United States	WC	2nd place, silver medalist(s)	7	1	4	5	6
2022	United States	OG	2nd place, silver medalist(s)	7	0	4	4	2
2022	United States	WC	2nd place, silver medalist(s)	7	1	8	9	0
2023	United States	WC	1st place, gold medalist(s)	7	2	0	2	0
2024	United States	WC	2nd place, silver medalist(s)	7	1	2	3	2
2025	United States	WC	1st place, gold medalist(s)	7	1	4	5	2
2026	United States	OG	1st place, gold medalist(s)	7	3	6	9	0
Junior totals				5	1	2	3	6
Senior totals				74	15	39	54	24

== Awards and honors ==
NCAA

- 2014–15 Hockey East First Team All-Star
- 2015–16 NCAA All American first team
- 2016–17 Cammi Granato Award (MVP of Women's Hockey East)
- 2016–17 Patty Kazmaier Top-10 Finalist
- 2016–17 Best Defensemen, Hockey East
- 2016–17 WHEA First Team All-Star
- 2016–17 AHCA-CCM Women's University Division I All-American
- 2016–17 AHCA All-American First Team
- 2018–19 Cammi Granato Award (Hockey East Player of the Year)
- 2018–19 Hockey East Best Defenseman
- 2018–19 Hockey East First Team All-Star
- 2018–19 AHCA All-American First Team
- 2018–19 Hockey East Player of the Month (January 2019)

PWHPA

- 2020–21 PWHPA All-Star

PWHL

- 2023–24 PWHL Defender of the Year Finalist
- 2023–24 PWHL Second Team All-Star
- 2025-26 PWHL First Team All-Star
- 2025-26 PWHL Defender of the Year
- EA Sports NHL 25 Team of the Year
