= Jules Constantinople =

American ice hockey player (born 2003)

- Born: July 3, 2003 (age 23) East Haven, Connecticut, U.S.
- Height: 5 ft 5 in (165 cm)
- Position: Defense
- Shoots: Left
- PWHL team: Vancouver Goldeneyes
- Playing career: 2022–present

Jules Constantinople (born July 3, 2003) is an American professional ice hockey defenceman for the Vancouver Goldeneyes of the Professional Women's Hockey League (PWHL). She played college ice hockey at Northeastern.

== Playing career ==
=== College ===
Constantinople began her college ice hockey career for Northeastern during the 2022–23 season. During the 2023–24 season, in her sophomore year, she recorded four goals and 12 assists in 39 games. During the 2024–25 season, in her junior year, she recorded five goals and 14 assists in 37 games. During the 2025–26 season, in her senior year, she recorded a career-high seven goals and 17 assists in 39 games and was named to the All-WHEA first team and the WHEA Best Defenseman.

=== Professional ===
On June 17, 2026, Constantinople was drafted in the third round, 25th overall, by the Vancouver Goldeneyes in the 2026 PWHL Draft.

== Career statistics ==
			Regular season					Playoffs
Season	Team	League	GP	G	A	Pts	PIM	GP	G	A	Pts	PIM
2022–23	Northeastern University	Hockey East	35	1	4	5	14	—	—	—	—	—
2023–24	Northeastern University	Hockey East	39	4	12	16	18	—	—	—	—	—
2024–25	Northeastern University	Hockey East	37	5	14	19	32	—	—	—	—	—
2025–26	Northeastern University	Hockey East	39	7	17	24	20	—	—	—	—	—
NCAA totals			150	17	64	81	84	—	—	—	—	—
