= Northeastern Huskies women's ice hockey =

- Current season
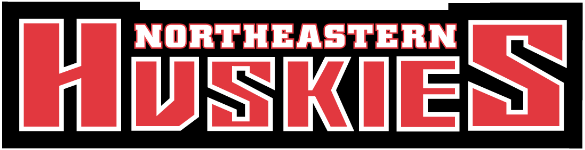
- University: Northeastern University
- Conference: Hockey East
- Athletic director: Jim Madigan
- Head coach: Dave Flint; 19th season, 400–172–48 (.684)
- Assistant coaches: Nick Carpenito; Lindsay Berman; Melissa Piacentini
- Arena: Matthews Arena; Boston, Massachusetts
- Student section: The DogHouse
- Colors: Red and black
- Fight song: All Hail, Northeastern
- Mascot: Paws

NCAA tournament runner-up
- 2021

NCAA tournament Frozen Four
- 2021, 2022, 2023, 2026

NCAA tournament appearances
- 2016, 2018, 2019, 2021, 2022, 2023, 2026

Conference tournament champions
- ECAC: 1988, 1989, 1997; Hockey East: 2018, 2019, 2020, 2021, 2022, 2023

Conference regular season champions
- Hockey East: 2012, 2019, 2020, 2021, 2022, 2023, 2026

The Northeastern Huskies women's ice hockey team represents Northeastern University. The Huskies play in the Hockey East conference.

== History ==
The women's varsity hockey program started in 1980 under Don MacLeod, who was named the coach the following season and led the program for ten seasons. Northeastern became the first national power in collegiate women's hockey under his direction. MacLeod was a former Massachusetts high school hockey coach at both Georgetown Junior/Senior High School and Saugus High School. Starting in the 1982–83 season, the Huskies had thirteen consecutive winning seasons, including six straight seasons of twenty or more wins between 1986–87 and 1991–92.

The program's best record was in 1987–88, when the undefeated squad finished 26–0–1, winning its first of three ECAC titles (the others coming in 1989 and 1997), at the time the effective national women's college championship. Northeastern has also been the ECAC finalist seven times, as well as winning twenty women's Beanpot tournaments, including nine straight between 1984 and 1991–92. The Huskies' all-time best mark for wins was in 2022–23 with 34 so far.

The program's career scoring leader is Alina Müller, currently with 98 goals and 156 assists for 254 points, while Kendall Coyne is the career goals leader with 141. Coyne also holds the single season goal and points record with 50 goals and 84 points in the 2015–2016 season. The previous single-season goal and points leader was Vicky Sunohara, with 51 goals and 78 points in 1988–89.

From 2017–2024, the Huskies played in eight consecutive Hockey East championships, winning six in a row from 2018–2023. Alina Müller (2019–2020, 2021–2022, 2022–2023) and Aerin Frankel (2017–2018, 2018–2019, 2020–2021) won the tournament MVP honors. The Huskies set a record for most goals in a women's Hockey East championship game with their 9–1 win over the University of Connecticut Huskies in 2020.

== Roster ==
As of January 25, 2026.

No.	Nat.	Player	Class	Pos	Height	DoB	Hometown	Previous team
1		Lisa Jonsson	Sophomore	G	6' 0" (1.83 m)	2004-08-30	Stockholm, Sweden	Modo Hockey
2		Lily Shannon (C)	Senior	F	5' 10" (1.78 m)	2003-08-21	Andover, Massachusetts	The Governor's Academy
5		Molly MacCurtain	Freshman	F	5' 5" (1.65 m)	2006-06-30	Reading, Massachusetts	East Coast Wizards
6		Allie Lalonde	Junior	F	5' 8" (1.73 m)	2005-01-06	Irvine, California	Shattuck St. Mary's
8		Brigitte Aube	Sophomore	F	5' 2" (1.57 m)	2001-06-25	Avon, Connecticut	MidFairfield Stars
9		Kristina Allard (A)	Senior	D	5' 4" (1.63 m)	2003-05-15	Kingston, New Hampshire	St. Paul's School
10		Holly Abela (A)	Senior	F	5' 4" (1.63 m)	2004-08-24	Brampton, Ontario	Brampton Jr. Canadettes
14		Emy McDermid	Freshman	F	5' 5" (1.65 m)	2007-03-05	Airdrie, Alberta	RHA Kelowna U18 Prep
15		Ellie Mabardy	Junior	F	5' 3" (1.6 m)	2004-11-23	Winchester, Massachusetts	Boston Jr. Eagles
16		Ella Lloyd	Freshman	D	5' 7" (1.7 m)	2007-10-16	Ardrossan, Alberta	Barrie Junior Sharks
17		Mia Langlois	Senior	F	5' 7" (1.7 m)	2004-03-23	Windham, New Hampshire	Cushing Academy
19		Lexi Mara	Freshman	D	5' 10" (1.78 m)	2007-02-27	Winchester, Massachusetts	Assabet Valley
21		Stryker Zablocki	Freshman	F	5' 7" (1.7 m)	2007-01-17	Prince Albert, Saskatchewan	BK Selects
22		Peyton Compton	Junior	F	5' 3" (1.6 m)	2005-08-17	Sanford, Florida	BK Selects
26		Rylie Jones	Junior	D	5' 6" (1.68 m)	2004-07-26	North Chelmsford, Massachusetts	East Coast Wizards
27		Tristian Thompson	Sophomore	D	6' 1" (1.85 m)	2006-08-26	Manotick, Ontario	Etobicoke Jr. Dolphins
28		Ella Blackmore	Junior	F	5' 5" (1.65 m)	2004-02-28	Northville, Michigan	Little Caesars
31		Renna Trembecky	Freshman	G	5' 4" (1.63 m)	2007-10-09	Sherwood Park, Alberta	U18 AAA Sherwood Park Ennis Kings
35		Paige Taborski	Graduate	G	5' 7" (1.7 m)	2003-07-31	Roscoe, Illinois	Chicago Mission
41		Jules Constantinople	Senior	D	5' 5" (1.65 m)	2003-07-03	East Haven, Connecticut	Williston Northampton School
61		Lily Brazis	Senior	F	5' 5" (1.65 m)	2004-02-05	Saugus, Massachusetts	Cushing Academy
74		Jaden Bogden (A)	Graduate	F	5' 10" (1.78 m)	2002-007-16	Edmonton, Alberta	Clarkson University
82		Alessia Baechler	Freshman	F	5' 9" (1.75 m)	2005-09-07	Illnau, Switzerland	HC Davos
91		Eloise Caron	Sophomore	F	5' 8" (1.73 m)	2005-05-02	Saint Hyacinthe, Quebec	Cégep Limoilou Titans
92		Morgan Jackson	Sophomore	F	5' 6" (1.68 m)	2006-03-09	Courtenay, British Columbia	Shawnigan Lake U18 Prep

== Season-by-season results ==
Won championship	Lost championship	Conference champions	League leader

Year	Coach	W	L	T	Conference	Conf. W	Conf. L	Conf. T	Finish	Conference Tournament	NCAA Tournament
2026–27	Dave Flint	3	1	1	Hockey East	2	0	0	1st HE	TBD	TBD
2025–26	Dave Flint	29	8	1	Hockey East	21	2	1	1st HE	Won Quarterfinals vs. Boston University (2–1 2-OT); Won Semifinals vs. Vermont (3–1); Lost Championship vs. Connecticut (1–2 2-OT)	Won Quarterfinals vs. Minnesota (4–2); Lost Semifinals vs. Ohio State (0–5)
2024–25	Dave Flint	22	14	1	Hockey East	15	11	1	5th HE	Won Quarterfinals vs. Providence (3–2); Won Semifinals vs. Connecticut (3–1); Lost Championship vs. Boston University (2–3 OT)	Did not qualify
2023–24	Dave Flint	25	11	3	Hockey East	16	8	3	2nd HE	Won Quarterfinals vs. Merrimack (4–1); Won Semifinals vs. New Hampshire (4–1); Lost Championship vs. Connecticut (0–1 OT)	Did not qualify
2022–23	Dave Flint	34	2	1	Hockey East	24	2	1	1st HE	Won Quarterfinals vs. Merrimack (5–1); Won Semifinals vs. Boston College (3–0); Won Championship vs. Providence (4–1)	Won Quarterfinals vs. Yale (4–1); Lost Semifinals vs. Ohio State (0–3)
2021–22	Dave Flint	31	5	2	Hockey East	21	3	2	1st HE	Won Quarterfinals vs. Merrimack (8–0); Won Semifinals vs. Maine (3–1); Won Championship vs. Connecticut (3–1)	Won Quarterfinals vs. Wisconsin (4–2); Lost Semifinals vs. Minnesota-Duluth (1–2 2OT)
2020–21	Dave Flint	22	2	1	Hockey East	17	1	1	1st HE	Won Quarterfinals vs. New Hampshire (7–0); Won Semifinals vs. Connecticut (2–1); Won Championship vs. Providence (6–2)	Won Quarterfinals vs. Robert Morris (5–1); Won Semifinals vs. Minnesota-Duluth (3–2 OT); Lost Championship vs. Wisconsin (1–2 OT)
2019–20	Dave Flint	32	4	2	Hockey East	24	3	0	1st HE	Won Quarterfinals vs. Vermont (5–1, 3–1); Won Semifinals vs. Maine (3–1); Won Championship vs. Connecticut (9–1)	Cancelled due to the COVID-19 pandemic in the United States
2018–19	Dave Flint	27	5	5	Hockey East	21	3	3	1st HE	Won Quarterfinals vs. Vermont (7–2, 1–0); Won Semifinals vs. Providence (3–2); Won Championship vs. Boston College (3–2 OT)	Lost Quarterfinals vs. Cornell (2–3 OT)
2017–18	Dave Flint	19	17	3	Hockey East	11	11	2	4th HE	Won Quarterfinals vs. New Hampshire (3–2, 2–1); Won Semifinals vs. Maine (2–1); Won Championship vs. Connecticut (2–1)	Lost Quarterfinals vs. Colgate (1–3)
2016–17	Dave Flint	22	12	3	Hockey East	14	8	2	2nd HE	Won Quarterfinals vs. Connecticut (6–2, 3–2 OT); Won Semifinals vs. Boston University (2–1); Lost Championship vs. Boston College (1–2 OT)	Did not qualify
2015–16	Dave Flint	28	9	1	Hockey East	20	4	0	2nd HE	Won Quarterfinals vs. Providence (5–2, 6–2); Lost Semifinals vs. Boston University (3–4)	Lost Quarterfinals vs. Boston College (1–5)
2014–15	Dave Flint	14	17	5	Hockey East	11	8	2	3rd HE	Won Quarterfinals vs. New Hampshire (1–2, 3–2, 4–3); Lost Semifinals vs. Boston University (1–6)	Did not qualify
2013–14	Dave Flint	19	14	2	Hockey East	13	6	2	3rd HE	Won Quarterfinals vs. Connecticut (2–1); Lost Semifinals vs. Boston University (2–3)	Did not qualify
2012–13	Dave Flint	23	11	2	Hockey East	13	7	1	3rd HE	Won Quarterfinals vs. Vermont (5–1); Won Semifinals vs. Boston College (4–1); Lost Championship vs. Boston University (2–5)	Did not qualify
2011–12	Dave Flint	22	7	4	Hockey East	15	3	3	1st HE	Lost Semifinals vs. Providence (0–2)	Did not qualify
2010–11	Dave Flint	16	13	8	Hockey East	6	10	5	5th HE	Won Quarterfinals vs. Connecticut (4–0); Won Semifinals vs. Boston University (4–2); Lost Championship vs. Boston College (1–3)	Did not qualify
2009–10	Dave Flint	17	9	7	Hockey East	9	6	6	4th HE	Lost Quarterfinals vs. Connecticut (1–4)	Did not qualify
2008–09	Dave Flint	12	20	3	Hockey East	7	13	1	6th HE	Lost Quarterfinals vs. Boston University (1–2)	Did not qualify
2007–08	Laura Schuler	7	24	3	Hockey East	6	14	1	6th HE	Did not qualify	Did not qualify
2006–07	Laura Schuler	5	26	2	Hockey East	4	15	2	7th HE	Did not qualify	Did not qualify
2005–06	Laura Schuler	8	24	1	Hockey East	6	14	1	7th HE	Did not qualify	Did not qualify
2004–05	Laura Schuler	3	25	4	Hockey East	2	15	3	6th HE	Did not qualify	Did not qualify
2003–04	Joy Woog	13	13	8	Hockey East	7	9	4	4th HE	Lost Semifinals vs. New Hampshire (0–5)	Did not qualify
2002–03	Joy Woog	9	18	4	Hockey East	4	10	1	5th HE	Did not qualify	Did not qualify
2001–02	Joy Woog	27	7	1	ECAC Eastern	15	5	1	2nd ECAC E.	Won Quarterfinals vs. Boston College (4–0); Won Semifinals vs. New Hampshire (2–0); Lost Championship vs. Providence (0–1)	Did not qualify
2000–01	Joy Woog	16	15	1	ECAC	13	10	1	5th ECAC	Lost Quarterfinals vs. Brown (2–4)	Did not qualify
1999–2000	Heather Lindstad	22	9	3	ECAC	15	6	3	7th ECAC	Won Quarterfinals vs. New Hampshire (4–3); Lost Semifinals vs. Brown (1–2)	Did not qualify
1998–99	Heather Lindstad	22	7	3	ECAC	18	5	3	4th ECAC	Won Quarterfinals vs. Providence (3–0); Lost Semifinals vs. New Hampshire (1–5)	Did not qualify

=== Beanpot ===
The Northeastern women have historically found success in the Beanpot, winning 20 of 46 tournaments and compiling a 56–31–6 record through 2025. The Huskies appeared in 16 straight finals, from 1983 to 1998, winning 13 of those tournaments, including 9 straight. The Huskies have qualified for the Beanpot finals 31 times through 2025:

- March 17, 1979: Northeastern 3, Boston College 1
- February 24, 1980: Northeastern 7, Harvard 1
- February 18, 1983: Northeastern 7, Harvard 1
- February 17, 1984: Northeastern 7, Harvard 1
- February 12, 1985: Northeastern 7, Boston College 0
- February 11, 1986: Northeastern 7, Harvard 0
- February 10, 1987: Northeastern 7, Harvard 1
- February 9, 1988: Northeastern 5, Harvard 1
- February 14, 1989: Northeastern 9, Harvard 0
- February 13, 1990: Northeastern 3, Harvard 2
- February 12, 1991: Northeastern 2, Harvard 1
- February 11, 1992: Harvard 3, Northeastern 0
- February 9, 1993: Brown 3, Northeastern 0
- February 15, 1994: Northeastern 6, Harvard 2
- February 14, 1995: Harvard 3, Northeastern 2
- February 13, 1996: Northeastern 4, Boston College 3 (OT)
- February 11, 1997: Northeastern 8, Harvard 1
- February 10, 1998: Northeastern 5, Harvard 4
- February 15, 2000: Harvard 4, Northeastern 3 (OT)
- February 13, 2001: Harvard 4, Northeastern 3 (OT)
- February 10, 2004, Harvard 5, Northeastern 1
- February 9, 2010: Harvard 1, Northeastern 0
- February 7, 2012: Northeastern 4, Boston University 3 (OT)
- February 12, 2013: Northeastern 4, Boston College 3
- February 11, 2014: Boston College 3, Northeastern 0
- February 9, 2016: Boston College 7, Northeastern 0
- February 7, 2017: Boston College 2, Northeastern 1
- February 11, 2020: Northeastern 4, Boston University 3 (2-OT)

2021: Cancelled due to the Coronavirus pandemic

- February 14, 2023: Northeastern 2, Boston College 1
- January 23, 2024: Northeastern 2, Boston University 1 (OT)
- January 21, 2025: Northeastern 4, Boston University 0

== Notable alumni ==
Among notable players for Northeastern have been former Canadian national team captain Vicky Sunohara, United States national team goaltender Kelly Dyer who was also the second woman to play professional ice hockey in North America, United States national team goaltender Chanda Gunn, ten-time United States national team member Shelley Looney, 2002 collegiate women's player of the year Brooke Whitney, and long time Canadian national team member and Olympic medalist Laura Schuler. Chelsey Goldberg is now a professional ice hockey player.

The following Huskies have played on the United States national team: Tina Cardinale (1990, 1992), Kendall Coyne (2010–26), Aerin Frankel (2019-2022), Chanda Gunn (2004-2007), Kim Haman (1992), Shelley Looney (1992-2006), Gwyneth Phillips (2024-2026), Hayley Scamurra (2019-2026), Erika Silva (2004), Jeanine Sobek (1990, 1992, 1994–96), Brooke White (2001, 2004), Hilary Witt (2001). Laura Schuler (1990-1998) and Vicky Sunohara (1990-2006) represented Canada. Florence Schelling was the goaltender of the Switzerland national team (2004–2018) while Alessia Baechler (2022-2026), Julia Marty (2004-2015), Alina Müller (2013-2026), and Ivana Wey (2026) have also played for Switzerland. Additionally, Rachel Llanes (2009-2014) represented China, Denisa Křîžová (2011-2026) represented Czechia, Chloé Aurard-Bushee (2015-2026) represented France

Hilary Witt

Witt came to Northeastern University in 1996 from Canton High School in Canton, Massachusetts. In hockey she played on the Assabet Valley Club team for four years while they won two National Championships. In her freshman year, she helped the Huskies to a 27–9 season and the 1997 ECAC Championship. Witt scored two goals, including the game winner, in the 3–2 title win over New Hampshire and as a rookie was named the tournament MVP. She led the team in scoring that season with 24 goals.

In Witt's sophomore season she led the team in scoring once again with 32 goals, and her 58 points (ranked in the nation's top 10). She was a nominee for the Patty Kazmaier Award and was voted All-ECAC. The team went 26–6–5 and qualified for the ECAC Tournament and the semifinals of the first ever women's hockey National Championship.

As a junior, Witt led NU with 27 goals, and was in the nation's top 10 in scoring. Once again, she was a Kazmaier nominee. The team went 25–7–3 and went on to the ECAC Tournament. Witt captained Northeastern's 1999–2000 team to a 22–9–3 season and another post-season appearance. She led NU in scoring with 30 goals for the fourth consecutive year. In terms of scoring, was in the nation's top 10, and was voted All-ECAC. Also, for the third year in a row she was a Kazmaier candidate. On February 10, 2010, she was inducted into the Women's Beanpot Hall of Fame. The induction honors her performance as a player for Northeastern in the annual tournament featuring the four Boston-area women's hockey teams. The ceremony was held prior to the Beanpot Championship game at Harvard's Bright Center.

== Olympians ==
Player	Position	Nationality	Event	Result
Aerin Frankel	Goaltender	United States	2026 Winter Olympics	Gold
Gwyneth Philips	Goaltender	United States	2026 Winter Olympics	Gold
Kendall Coyne Schofield	Forward	United States	2026 Winter Olympics	Gold
Kendall Coyne Schofield	Forward	United States	2022 Winter Olympics	Silver
Kendall Coyne Schofield	Forward	United States	2018 Winter Olympics	Gold
Kendall Coyne Schofield	Forward	United States	2014 Winter Olympics	Silver
Chanda Gunn	Goaltender	United States	2006 Winter Olympics	Bronze
Denisa Křížová	Forward	Czech Republic	2026 Winter Olympics	t5th
Denisa Křížová	Forward	Czech Republic	2022 Winter Olympics	7th
Rachel Llanes	Forward	China	2022 Winter Olympics	9th
Chloe Aurard	Forward	France	2026 Winter Olympics	t9th
Alessia Baechler	Defense	Switzerland	2026 Winter Olympics	Bronze
Julia Marty	Forward	Switzerland	2006 Winter Olympics	7th
Julia Marty	Forward	Switzerland	2010 Winter Olympics	5th
Alina Müller	Forward	Switzerland	2026 Winter Olympics	Bronze
Alina Müller	Forward	Switzerland	2022 Winter Olympics	4th
Alina Müller	Forward	Switzerland	2018 Winter Olympics	5th
Alina Müller	Forward	Switzerland	2014 Winter Olympics	Bronze
Karen Nystrom	Forward	Canada	1998 Winter Olympics	Silver
Hayley Scamurra	Forward	United States	2026 Winter Olympics	Gold
Hayley Scamurra	Forward	United States	2022 Winter Olympics	Silver
Florence Schelling	Goaltender	Switzerland	2006 Winter Olympics	7th
Florence Schelling	Goaltender	Switzerland	2010 Winter Olympics	5th
Florence Schelling	Goaltender	Switzerland	2014 Winter Olympics	Bronze
Florence Schelling	Goaltender	Switzerland	2018 Winter Olympics	5th
Laura Schuler	Forward	Canada	1998 Winter Olympics	Silver
Vicky Sunohara	Forward	Canada	1998 Winter Olympics	Silver
Vicky Sunohara	Forward	Canada	2002 Winter Olympics	Gold
Vicky Sunohara	Forward	Canada	2006 Winter Olympics	Gold

== Awards and honors ==
=== NCAA ===
Patty Kazmaier Award

- Brooke Whitney (2002)
- Kendall Coyne (2016)
- Aerin Frankel (2021)

WHCA Goalie of the Year

- Aerin Frankel (2021, 2022)
- Gwyneth Philips (2023)

Humanitarian Award

- Chanda Gunn (2004)
- Missy Elumba (2009)

NCAA Sportsmanship Award

- Chanda Gunn (2004)

Honda Inspiration Award

- Chanda Gunn (2004)

Bauer Goaltending Champion

- Florence Schelling (2010, 2012)

AHCA Coach of the Year

- Dave Flint (2021, 2023)

NCAA Today's Top 10 Award

- Kendall Coyne (2017)

==== Division I All-American ====
First Team

- 2000-01: Erika Silva
- 2001-02: Brooke Whitney
- 2003-04: Chanda Gunn
- 2011-12: Florence Schelling
- 2015-16: Kendall Coyne
- 2019-20: Aerin Frankel, Alina Müller
- 2020-21: Skylar Fontaine, Aerin Frankel, Alina Müller
- 2021-22: Skylar Fontaine, Aerin Frankel
- 2022-23: Alina Müller, Gwyneth Philips
- 2023-24: Gwyneth Philips

Second Team

- 1998-99: Jaime Totten
- 2000-01: Brooke Whitney
- 2001-02: Kim Greene, Chanda Gunn
- 2009-10: Florence Schelling
- 2012-13: Kendall Coyne
- 2014-15: Kendall Coyne
- 2018-19: Skylar Fontaine, Alina Müller
- 2019-20: Skylar Fontaine
- 2020-21: Chloé Aurard
- 2021-22: Alina Müller, Maureen Murphy

=== ECAC / ECAC Eastern ===
Player of the Year

- Shelley Looney (1994)
- Brooke Whitney (2002)

Rookie of the Year

- Vicky Sunohara (1989)

Goalie of the Year

- Erika Silva (2001)

Tournament MVP

- Shelley Looney (1993)
- Hilary Witt (1997)
- Chanda Gunn (2002)

Sarah Devens Award

- Jaime Totten (1989)
- Kathryn Waldo (1997)

==== All-ECAC ====
First Team

- 1993-94: Michelle DiStefano, Shelley Looney, Jeanine Sobek
- 1997-98: Jaime Totten
- 2000-01: Erika Silva, Brooke Whitney
- 2001-02: Kim Greene, Brooke White, Brooke Whitney

Second Team

- 1997-98: Hilary Witt
- 1998-99: Jaime Totten
- 1999-00: Hilary Witt
- 2001-02: Chanda Gunn

Honorable Mention

- 1998-99: Erika Silva, Hilary Witt
- 1999-00: Erine Metcalf

=== Hockey East ===
Player of the Year

- Chanda Gunn (2004)
- Florence Schelling (2010, 2012)
- Kendall Coyne (2016)
- Alina Müller (2020, 2021, 2023)
- Aerin Frankel (2021)
- Stryker Zablocki (2026)

Rookie of the Year

- Kendall Coyne (2012)
- Alina Müller (2019)
- Stryker Zablocki (2026)

Goalie of the Year

- Chanda Gunn (2004)
- Florence Schelling (2012)
- Aerin Frankel (2019, 2020, 2021, 2022)
- Gwyneth Philips (2023, 2024)

Coach of the Year

- Joy Woog (2004)
- Dave Flint (2012, 2019, 2020, 2021, 2023)

Scoring Champion

- Kendall Coyne (2016)
- Alina Müller (2020, 2021, 2023)
- Stryker Zablocki (2026)

Best Defenseman

- Skylar Fontaine (2020, 2021, 2022)
- Megan Carter (2023, 2024)
- Jules Constantinople (2026)

Best Defensive Forward

- Casey Pickett (2012)
- Hayley Scamurra (2017)
- Matti Hartman (2020)

Tournament MVP

- Aerin Frankel (2018, 2019, 2021)
- Alina Müller (2020, 2022, 2023)

"Three-Stars" Award

- Chanda Gunn (2004)
- Leah Sulyma (2008)
- Florence Schelling (2012)
- Kendall Coyne (2013, 2016)
- Alina Müller (2020)
- Aerin Frankel (2021)
- Gwyneth Philips (2024)

Sportsmanship Award

- Paige Capistran (2020)

==== All-Hockey East ====
First Team

- 2003–04: Chanda Gunn
- 2009–10: Florence Schelling
- 2011–12: Florence Schelling, Kendall Coyne
- 2012–13: Kendall Coyne
- 2013–14: Heather Mottau
- 2014–15: Kendall Coyne
- 2015–16: Kendall Coyne
- 2016–17: McKenna Brand
- 2018–19: Skylar Fontaine, Aerin Frankel, Alina Müller
- 2019–20: Chloé Aurard, Skylar Fontaine, Aerin Frankel, Alina Müller
- 2020–21: Chloé Aurard, Skylar Fontaine, Aerin Frankel, Alina Müller
- 2021–22: Skylar Fontaine, Aerin Frankel, Maureen Murphy
- 2022–23: Megan Carter, Alina Müller, Gwyneth Philips
- 2023–24: Megan Carter, Gwyneth Philips
- 2025–26: Jules Constantinople, Lily Shannon, Stryker Zablocki

Second Team

- 2002–03: Chanda Gunn
- 2003–04: Theresa Ella, Amy Goodney
- 2004–05: Lori DiGiacomo
- 2011–12: Stephanie Gavronsky, Casey Pickett
- 2012–13: Casey Pickett
- 2013–14: Brittany Esposito, Kelly Wallace
- 2015–16: Brittany Bugalski, Jordan Krause, Denisa Křížová
- 2016–17: Denisa Křížová, Heather Mottau
- 2017–18: Lauren Kelly
- 2018–19: Brooke Hobson
- 2020–21: Brooke Hobson
- 2021–22: Chloé Aurard, Brooke Hobson, Alina Müller
- 2022–23: Chloé Aurard, Maureen Murphy
- 2023–24: Peyton Anderson, Jules Constantinople
- 2024–25: Skylar Irving
- 2025–26: Lisa Jonsson, Kristina Allard

Third Team

- 2018–19: Kasidy Anderson
- 2019–20: Brooke Hobson, Katy Knoll
- 2020–21: Maureen Murphy
- 2022–23: Katy Knoll, Abbey Marohn, Maude Poulin-Labelle
- 2023–24: Skylar Irving, Katy Knoll
- 2024–25: Tuva Kandell
- 2025-26: Morgan Jackson

Honorable Mention

- 2002–03: Kim Greene, Brooke White
- 2003–04: Cyndy Kenyon
- 2004–05: Amy Goodney, Marisa Hourihan
- 2005–06: Marisa Hourihan, Nikki Petrich
- 2006–07: Chelsey Jones
- 2008–09: Kristi Kehoe, Julia Marty
- 2010–11: Rachel Llanes
- 2012–13: Chloe Desjardins, Maggie DiMasi
- 2013–14: Katie MacSorley, Colleen Murphy
- 2014–15: Heather Mottau
- 2015–16: Heather Mottau
- 2018–19: Veronika Pettey
- 2021–22: Megan Carter

=== Beanpot Awards ===
==== Most Valuable Player ====
- 1979 Diane DerBogoshian
- 1980 Diane Sorrenti
- 1984 Stephanie Kelly
- 1985 Tracy Hill
- 1986 Nina Koyama
- 1987 Fiona Rice
- 1988 Tina Cardinale
- 1989 Vicky Sunohara
- 1990 Julie Piacentini
- 1991 Sue Guay
- 1993 Kim Haman
- 1994 Shelley Looney
- 1996 Jessica Wagner
- 1997 Stephanie Acres
- 1998 Lisa Giovanelli
- 2012 Casey Pickett
- 2013 Kendall Coyne
- 2020 Chloé Aurard
- 2023 Maureen Murphy
- 2024 Skylar Irving
- 2025 Lisa Jönsson

==== Bertagna Award (top goalie) ====
- 2000 Erika Silva
- 2001 Erika Silva
- 2012 Florence Schelling
- 2013 Chloe Desjardins
- 2017 Brittany Bugalski
- 2020 Aerin Frankel
- 2023 Gwyneth Philips
- 2024 Gwyneth Philips
- 2025 Lisa Jönsson

==== Beanpot Hall of Fame ====
- 2008 Diane DerBoghosian (1981)
- 2009 Julie Piacentini (1991)
- 2010 Hilary Witt (2001)
- 2011 Kathryn Waldo (1999)
- 2012 Don MacLeod (Head Coach)
- 2013 Kelly Dyer Hayes (1990)
- 2014 Jill Toney (1986)
- 2015 Brooke Whitney (2003)
- 2016 Tina Cardinale-Beauchemin (1989)
- 2017 Jessica Wagner (1997)
- 2019 Linda Lundrigan (1984)
- 2020 Casey Pickett Bates (2013)
- 2022 Nina Koyama (1989)
- 2023 Fiona Rice (1990)
- 2024 Shelley Looney (1994)
- 2025 Erika Silva Adams (2001)

=== Northeastern Hall of Fame ===
- 1995 Kelly Dyer
- 1999 Shelley Looney
- 2002 Tina Cardinale
- 2004 Laura Schuler
- 2005 Hilary Witt
- 2008 Brooke Whitney
- 2009 Donna-Lynn Rosa
- 2011 Carolyn Sullivan
- 2012 Chanda Gunn
- 2020 Florence Schelling
- 2021 Fiona Rice
- 2023 Kendall Coyne Schofield

== Huskies in professional hockey ==
= CWHL All-Star	= NWHL All-Star	= Clarkson Cup Champion	= Isobel Cup Champion	= Walter Cup Champion

As of January 22, 2024.

Player	Position	Team(s)	League(s)	Years	Championships
Chloé Aurard	Forward	New York Sirens; Boston Fleet	PWHL; PWHL	2023–2025; 2025–Present	
McKenna Brand	Forward	Boston Pride (A)	NWHL/PHF	2018–23	Isobel Cup (2021, 2022)
Paige Capistran	Forward	Boston Pride	NWHL/PHF	2020–22	Isobel Cup (2021, 2022)
Megan Carter	Defense	Toronto Sceptres; PWHL Seattle	PWHL; PWHL	2024–2025; 2025–Present	
Kendall Coyne Schofield	Forward	Minnesota Whitecaps; Team Adidas; Minnesota Frost (C)	NWHL; PWHPA; PWHL	2018–19; 2019–23; 2023–Present	Isobel Cup (2019); Walter Cup (2024, 2025)
Brittany Esposito	Forward	Calgary Inferno	CWHL	2014–18	Clarkson Cup (2016)
Skylar Fontaine	Defense	ZSC Lions Frauen	SWHL A	2022–24	SWHL Champion (2023, 2024)
Aerin Frankel	Goaltender	Team Adidas; Boston Fleet	PWHPA; PWHL	2022–23; 2023–Present	
Chelsey Goldberg	Forward	Worcester Blades; Team Women's Sports Foundation; Team Adidas; Skellefteå AIK	CWHL; PWHPA; PWHPA; HockeyAllsvenskan	2016–19; 2020–21; 2021–22; 2023–24	
Brooke Hobson	Defense	MoDo Hockey; New York Sirens; Ottawa Charge	SDHL; PWHL; PWHL	2022–23; 2023–2025; 2025–Present	
Skylar Irving	Forward	Montréal Victoire	PWHL	2025–Present	
Lauren Kelly	Defense	Boston Pride	NWHL/PHF	2018–23	Isobel Cup (2021, 2022)
Katy Knoll	Forward	Minnesota Frost	PWHL	2024–Present	Walter Cup (2025)
Denisa Křížová	Forward	Boston Pride; Brynäs IF; Minnesota Whitecaps; Minnesota Frost; PWHL Vancouver	NWHL; SDHL; PHF; PWHL; PWHL	2018–19; 2019–22; 2022–23; 2023–2025; 2025–Present	Walter Cup (2024, 2025)
Rachel Llanes	Forward	Boston Blades; Boston Pride; Shenzhen KRS (A)	CWHL; NWHL; CWHL/ZhHL	2013–15; 2015–17; 2017–22	Clarkson Cup (2015); Isobel Cup (2016); ZhHL Champion (2020)
Julia Marty	Forward	SC Reinach; Linköping HC; SC Reinach; Neuchâtel Hockey Academy; SC Reinach; EV Bomo Thun; SC Bern Frauen	LKA; Riksserien; SWHL A SWHL A SWHL A SWHL A SWHL A	2011–13; 2013–14; 2014–15; 2016–17; 2017–21; 2021–23; 2023–Present	Riksserien Champion (2014)
Alina Müller	Forward	ZSC Lions Frauen; Boston Fleet	LKA/SWHL A PWHL	2023–24; 2023–Present	
Colleen Murphy	Defense	Buffalo Beauts; Connecticut Whale; Metropolitan Riveters	NWHL; NWHL; NWHL/PHF	2017–18; 2018–19; 2019–22	
Maureen Murphy	Forward	Montréal Victoire	PWHL	2023–Present	
Karen Nystrom	Forward	Scarborough Firefighters; Toronto Red Wings; Newtonbrook Panthers; Brampton Thunder	COWHL; COWHL; COWHL; NWHL-CA	1992–94; 1995–96; 1996–97; 1998–00	
Gwyneth Philips	Goaltender	Ottawa Charge	PWHL	2024–Present	
Maude Poulin-Labelle	Defense	PWHL Toronto	PWHL	2023–24	
Hayley Scamurra	Forward	Buffalo Beauts (A); Team WSF; Team Harvey's; Ottawa Charge; Toronto Sceptres; Montréal Victoire	NWHL; PWHPA; PWHPA; PWHL; PWHL; PWHL	2016–19; 2020–21; 2022–23; 2023–2024; 2024–2025; 2025–Present	
Florence Schelling	Goaltender	Brampton Thunder; SC Reinach; Linköping HC	CWHL; LKA/SWHL A Riksserien/SDHL	2012–13; 2013–15; 2015–18	
Tori Sullivan	Forward	Boston Pride; Connecticut Whale	NWHL/PHF; PHF	2019–22; 2022–23	Isobel Cup (2021, 2022)
Vicky Sunohara	Forward	Scarborough Firefighters; Toronto Red Wings; Newtonbrook Panthers; Brampton Thunder (C)	COWHL; COWHL; COWHL; NWHL-CA/CWHL	1992–94; 1994–96; 1996–97; 1998–09	CWHL Champion (2008)
Brooke White-Lancette	Forward	Minnesota Whitecaps (A)	WWHL/NWHL/PHF	2004–22	Clarkson Cup (2010); Isobel Cup (2019)
Brooke Whitney	Forward	Brampton Thunder	NWHL-CA	2002–03	
Alyssa Wohlfeiler	Forward	Boston Blades; Ladies Team Lugano; Connecticut Whale; HV71; EC Bergkamener Bären; Boston Pride; Connecticut Whale (A)	CWHL; SWHL A NWHL; SDHL; DFEL; NWHL; NWHL/PHF	2011–14; 2014–15; 2015–16; 2017–18; 2018–19; 2019–20; 2020–23	SWHL Champion (2015)

== See also ==
- Northeastern Huskies men's ice hockey
- Northeastern Huskies
