= Paige Capistran =

American ice hockey player (born 1998)

- Born: May 7, 1998 (age 28) Manchester, New Hampshire, U.S.
- Height: 5 ft 5 in (165 cm)
- Position: Forward
- Shot: Right
- NWHL team Former teams: Boston Pride: Northeastern Huskies (NCAA)
- National team: United States
- Playing career: 2016–2022

Paige Capistran (born May 7, 1998) is a retired American ice hockey and Former play-by-play broadcaster of the Ontario Reign. player who last played for the Boston Pride in the National Women's Hockey League and the Northeastern Huskies in the NCAA. She is currently an on-air commentator for Hockey East broadcasts and the PWHL.

== Career ==
Across 145 NCAA games, she scored 30 points. As a senior she served as team captain of the Northeastern Huskies. She was the first Northeastern player to win the Hockey East Sportsmanship Award. Capistran was drafted 30th overall by the Boston Pride in the 2020 NWHL Draft. She signed her first professional contract with the team ahead of the 2020-21 NWHL season. She retired from professional hockey following the 2021-2022 season.

== Personal life ==
Capistran majored in communications at Northeastern University.

== Career stats ==
| | | | Regular Season | | | | | Playoffs |
| Season | Team | League | GP | G | A | Pts | PIM | GP | G | A | Pts | PIM |
|---|---|---|---|---|---|---|---|---|---|---|---|---|
| 2016–17 | Northeastern University | NCAA | 36 | 1 | 5 | 6 | 24 | - | - | - | - | - |
| 2017–18 | Northeastern University | NCAA | 33 | 0 | 1 | 1 | 16 | - | - | - | - | - |
| 2018–19 | Northeastern University | NCAA | 38 | 3 | 9 | 12 | 20 | - | - | - | - | - |
| 2019–20 | Northeastern University | NCAA | 38 | 0 | 11 | 11 | 4 | - | - | - | - | - |
| 2020–21 | Boston Pride | NWHL |
| NWHL totals |

== Honors ==
- 2016-2017 WHEA All-Academic Team
- 2019-2020 American Hockey Coaches Association American Scholar
- 2019-2020 Hockey East Sportsmanship Award Winner
- 2019-2020 Finished her career with 145 games played (tied for sixth-most all-time at NU)
- 2019-2020 Hockey East All-Academic Team
