= Alina Müller =

Swiss ice hockey player (born 1998)

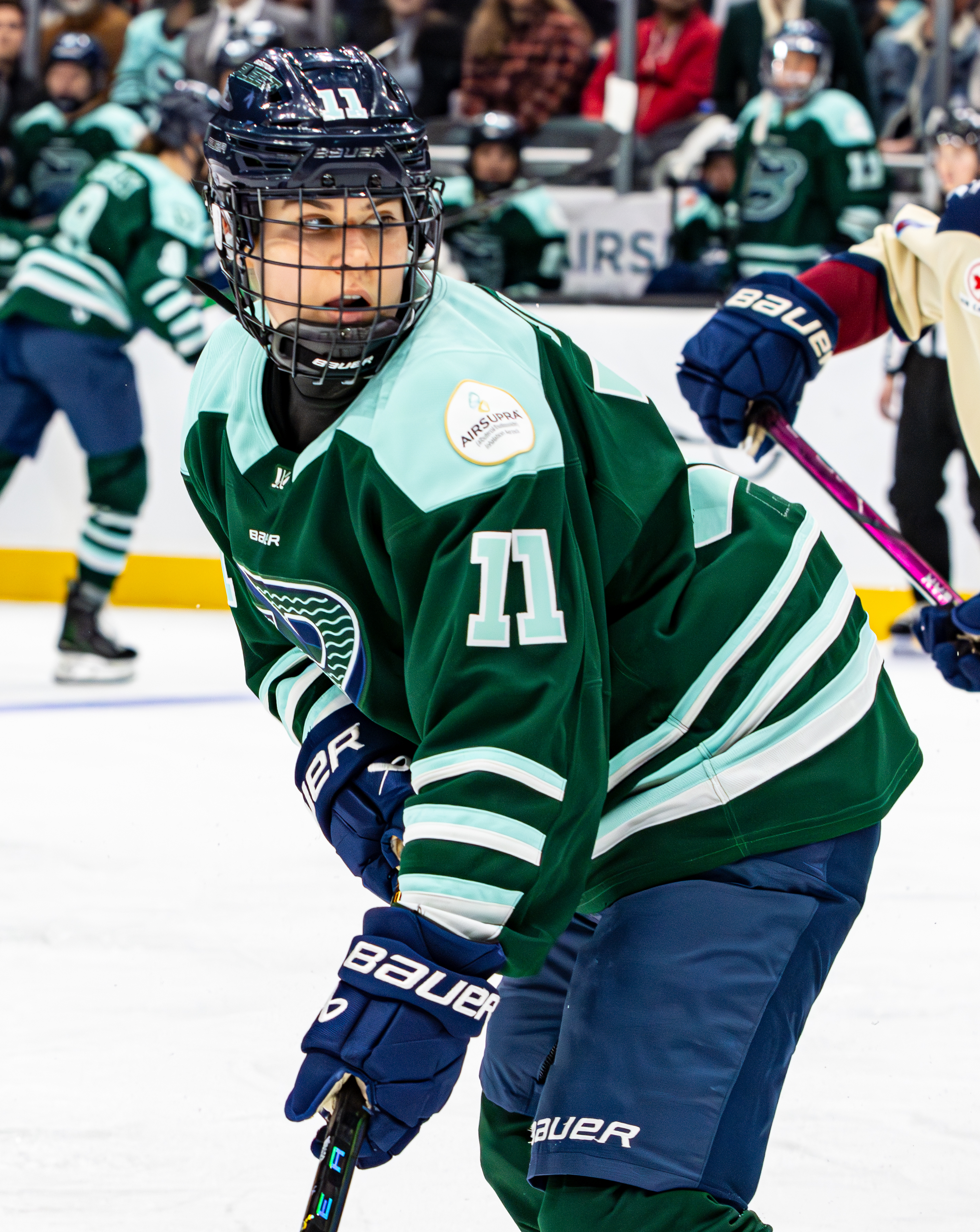
- Müller with Boston Fleet in 2025
- Born: 12 March 1998 (age 28) Lengnau, Switzerland
- Height: 1.67 m (5 ft 6 in)
- Weight: 63 kg (139 lb; 9 st 13 lb)
- Position: Forward
- Shoots: Left
- PWHL team Former teams: Hamilton Havoc; Boston Fleet; ZSC Lions
- National team: Switzerland
- Playing career: 2013–present
Medal record
Olympic Games
Bronze medal – third place	2014 Sochi	Team
Bronze medal – third place	2026 Milano Cortina	Team

Alina Müller (born 12 March 1998) is a Swiss ice hockey player who is a forward for the Hamilton Havoc of the Professional Women's Hockey League (PWHL) and a member of the Switzerland women's national ice hockey team. She played college ice hockey at Northeastern. At the age of 15, she became the youngest ice hockey player ever to win an Olympic medal, scoring the game-winning goal for Switzerland in the bronze medal game at the 2014 Winter Olympics. She scored the game-winning goal for Switzerland in the bronze game at the 2026 Winter Olympics as well.

== Playing career ==
=== PWHL ===
==== Boston Fleet ====
On September 18, 2023, Müller was selected in the first round, 3rd overall, by PWHL Boston in the 2023 PWHL Draft, becoming the first European player affiliated with a PWHL team.

In the inaugural season of the league, Müller helped her team reach the Walter Cup Finals, and she would score a double overtime winner in Game 4 against PWHL Minnesota to force a decisive Game 5. Unfortunately, Müller and Boston would be shut out on home ice, losing the Finals. During the 2024–25 season, she recorded seven goals and 12 assists in 26 games. On August 4, 2025, Müller signed a two-year contract extension with the Fleet.

==== Hamilton Havoc ====
On June 6, 2026, the Hamilton Havoc announced that Müller had signed a three-year contract as part of the second phase in the PWHL Expansion Roster Distribution Process.

== International play ==
Müller represented Switzerland at the 2014 Winter Olympics and helped them win a bronze medal after scoring the game-winning goal to defeat Sweden in the bronze medal playoff. This resulted in her becoming the youngest ice hockey player to ever win an Olympic medal, at the age of 15.

During the Swiss opening match against the United Korean team at the 2018 Winter Olympics, Müller tied the Olympic record for most goals scored by a woman in an Olympic game. She scored a hat trick in the first period, and a fourth goal in the second. Müller helped Switzerland place 5th overall at the 2018 Olympics.

In the quarterfinal round of the 2026 Winter Olympics, Muller scored the only goal of the match as Switzerland defeated Finland in a 1–0 final, Of note, Muller and Lara Stalder were the only members of the 2014 Olympic team that were part of the Swiss roster at the 2026 Winter Olympics . Müller helped Switzerland win a bronze medal after scoring the game-winning goal to defeat Sweden in the bronze medal playoff.

Müller is the all-time leading goal scorer in Swiss women's hockey history at the Winter Olympics. Müller now sits fourth all-time in Olympic women's hockey goal scoring.

== Career statistics ==
=== Regular season and playoffs ===
			Regular season					Playoffs
Season	Team	League	GP	G	A	Pts	PIM	GP	G	A	Pts	PIM
2012–13	ZSC Lions	LKA	2	1	2	3	0	4	2	2	4	0
2013–14	ZSC Lions	LKA	3	3	2	5	0	2	2	0	2	0
2014–15	ZSC Lions	SWHL A	–	–	–	–	–	3	0	0	0	0
2017–18	ZSC Lions	SWHL A	17	33	24	57	12	6	17	6	23	0
2018–19	Northeastern University	NCAA	37	21	30	51	34	—	—	—	—	—
2019–20	Northeastern University	NCAA	38	27	39	66	12	—	—	—	—	—
2020–21	Northeastern University	NCAA	25	12	26	38	10	—	—	—	—	—
2021–22	Northeastern University	NCAA	21	11	28	39	2	—	—	—	—	—
2022–23	Northeastern University	NCAA	38	27	33	60	12	—	—	—	—	—
2023–24	PWHL Boston	PWHL	24	5	11	16	6	8	2	1	3	0
2024–25	Boston Fleet	PWHL	26	7	12	19	8	—	—	—	—	—
PWHL totals			50	12	23	35	14	8	2	1	3	0

=== International ===
Year	Team	Event	Result	GP	G	A	Pts	PIM
2013	Switzerland	U18 D1	2nd place, silver medalist(s)	5	3	4	7	2
2014	Switzerland	OG	3rd place, bronze medalist(s)	6	1	2	3	6
2014	Switzerland	U18 D1	1st place, gold medalist(s)	5	9	3	12	4
2015	Switzerland	U18	7th	5	5	0	5	4
2015	Switzerland	WC	6th	4	1	0	1	4
2016	Switzerland	U18	7th	5	7	2	9	10
2016	Switzerland	WC	7th	3	1	1	2	0
2017	Switzerland	OGQ	Q	3	3	5	8	2
2017	Switzerland	WC	7th	6	4	4	8	2
2018	Switzerland	OG	5th	6	7	3	10	4
2019	Switzerland	WC	5th	5	1	1	2	4
2021	Switzerland	WC	4th	2	1	0	1	2
2022	Switzerland	OG	4th	7	4	6	10	4
2022	Switzerland	WC	4th	3	1	1	2	2
2023	Switzerland	WC	4th	7	4	6	10	8
2024	Switzerland	WC	5th	6	2	2	4	4
2026	Switzerland	OG	3rd place, bronze medalist(s)	7	4	2	6	4
Junior totals				20	24	9	33	20
Senior totals				63	34	33	67	46

== Awards and honors ==
- 2018 Swiss Ice Hockey Woman of the Year
- 2018-19 CCM/AHCA First Team All-American
- 2019 Swiss Ice Hockey Woman of the Year
- 2019-20 CCM/AHCA Second Team All-American
- 2020-21 CCM/AHCA First Team All-American
- 2020-21 All-USCHO.com First Team
- 2021 Hockey East Scoring Champion (31 points)
- 2021 NCAA All-Tournament Team
- Hockey Commissioners Association Women's Player of the Month (February 2021)
- 2022 Swiss Ice Hockey Woman of the Year
- 2023–24 PWHL All-Rookie Team
- 2026 Winter Olympics All-Star Team (as voted by accredited media)

== Personal life ==
Alina Müller is the younger sister of professional hockey player Mirco Müller, a former member of the New Jersey Devils and San Jose Sharks of the National Hockey League.

Sporting positions
Preceded by (United States) Aerin Frankel (Northeastern Huskies)	WHEA Tournament; Most Valuable Player; 2020	Succeeded by (United States) Aerin Frankel (Northeastern Huskies)
Preceded by (United States) Aerin Frankel (Northeastern Huskies)	WHEA Tournament; Most Valuable Player; 2022 & 2023	Succeeded by Incumbent
Preceded by Megan Keller; Herself and Aerin Frankel; Theresa Schafzahl	Cammi Granato Award (Hockey East Player of the Year); 2020; 2021 (with Aerin Frankel); 2023	Succeeded by Herself and Aerin Frankel; Theresa Schafzahl; Natálie Mlýnková
