= Women's Hockey Commissioners Association National Goalie of the Year =

Women's College Hockey National Goalie of the Year
- Sport: Ice hockey
- Awarded for: The most outstanding goalie in NCAA Division I women's ice hockey
- Presented by: Women's Hockey Commissioners Association

History
- First award: 2021
- Most recent: Tia Chan

The Women's Hockey Commissioners Association National Goalie of the Year is awarded yearly to the most outstanding goalie in NCAA Division I women's college ice hockey by the Women's Hockey Commissioners Association.

== Award winners ==
| Season | Player | School | Ref |
|---|---|---|---|
| 2021 | Aerin Frankel | Northeastern | |
| 2022 | Aerin Frankel | Northeastern | |
| 2023 | Gwyneth Philips | Northeastern | |
| 2024 | Michelle Pasiechnyk | Clarkson | |
| 2025 | Ava McNaughton | Wisconsin | |
| 2026 | Tia Chan | Connecticut | |

=== Winners by school ===
| School | Winners |
|---|---|
| Northeastern | 3 |
| Clarkson | 1 |
| Connecticut | 1 |
| Wisconsin | 1 |
