= Aerin Frankel =

American ice hockey player (born 1999)

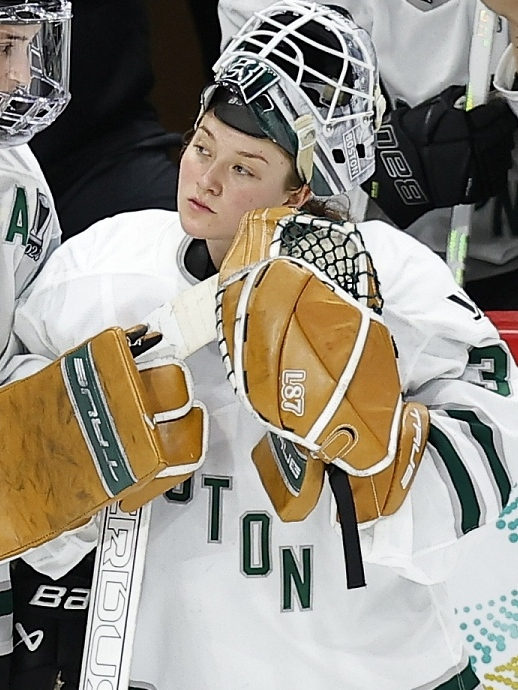
- Frankel with PWHL Boston in 2024
- Born: May 24, 1999 (age 27) Briarcliff Manor, New York, U.S.
- Height: 5 ft 5 in (165 cm)
- Weight: 140 lb (64 kg; 10 st 0 lb)
- Position: Goaltender
- Catches: Left
- PWHL team Former teams: Boston Fleet; Northeastern University
- National team: United States
- Playing career: 2017–present
Medal record
Olympic Games
Gold medal – first place	2026 Milano Cortina	Team
World Championships
Gold medal – first place	2023 Canada
Gold medal – first place	2025 Czechia
Gold medal – first place	2026 Denmark
Silver medal – second place	2021 Canada
Silver medal – second place	2022 Denmark
Silver medal – second place	2024 United States

Aerin Jordan Frankel (born May 24, 1999) is an American professional ice hockey goaltender for the Boston Fleet of the Professional Women's Hockey League (PWHL) and member of the United States women's national ice hockey team. She is a two-time IIHF Women's World Championship gold medalist (2023, 2025) and silver medalist (2024), having served as Team USA's primary goaltender at three consecutive World Championships. Frankel became the first U.S. women's goaltender to start five consecutive games at an Olympics or World Championship in 26 years during the 2023 tournament. On February 10, 2026, she became the first American goaltender to record a shutout against Canada at the Olympics.

In college hockey, Frankel was one of the most decorated goaltenders in NCAA history. She won the Patty Kazmaier Award in 2021 as the top player in women's college hockey, the Bob Allen Women's Player of the Year award in 2021, and was the inaugural recipient of the WHCA National Goalie of the Year award in 2021, winning it again in 2022. At Northeastern University, she set program records for save percentage, goals-against average, wins, and shutouts, and led the Huskies to the 2021 NCAA championship game.

Professionally, Frankel has established herself as one of the PWHL's premier goaltenders. In the inaugural PWHL season, she led the Boston Fleet to the Walter Cup Finals, setting playoff records with 57 saves in a triple-overtime victory and leading all goaltenders with a .953 save percentage across eight playoff games, for which she was dubbed the Green Monster by fans and the media. She was named a PWHL Second Team All-Star in 2024 and was a finalist for PWHL Goaltender of the Year in both 2024 and 2025. On January 31, 2025, she became the first goaltender in PWHL history to record 1,000 saves. Following a season-long .953 save percentage and eight shutouts, Frankel was named the Billie Jean King MVP award winner and Goaltender of the Year winner for the 2025–2026 season. She was also named a PWHL First Team All-Star in 2026.

== Early life ==
Born and raised in Briarcliff Manor, New York, Aerin is the daughter of Deborah and Peter Frankel and has an older brother, Jake. The Frankel family is Jewish. Growing up, Frankel enjoyed playing knee hockey with her brother and cousins. Her mother brought her to the ice at age four, where she learned to skate. "I think I fell in love with it through learning [that] I had a lot of fun just skating around without the hockey aspect, and I was like, 'Oh, hey, I can play a sport with this,'" Frankel recalled. She initially began as a player but transitioned to goaltender at age nine after realizing she wouldn't have to leave the ice if she played in goal. "So then I tried out for goalie and loved it," she said.

From elementary school through high school, Frankel competed on boys' club teams, as was common for girls seeking to play at a high level. She also participated in other sports during the off-season—soccer in elementary school, softball in middle school, and lacrosse in high school—but remained focused primarily on hockey. "I never really focused on bettering myself in any sport other than hockey," she said. She initially attended Horace Greeley High School in Chappaqua, New York, before transferring to Shattuck-Saint Mary's preparatory school in Faribault, Minnesota, as a sophomore. The transition to boarding school proved difficult initially. "At first I was a little bit homesick," Frankel said. "I missed being home with my family, having my mom cook and clean for me, it was a different lifestyle for sure, learning to do things for myself." At Shattuck-Saint Mary's, Frankel excelled in the school's elite hockey program, winning three national titles (one U-16 and two U-19). She posted 106 wins during her time at Shattuck, finishing with a 1.10 goals against average, a .945 save percentage, and 39 shutouts. She graduated from Shattuck-Saint Mary's with high honors.

== Playing career ==
=== Collegiate ===
In 2017, Frankel began attending Northeastern University, serving as the starting goaltender for the Huskies. Despite being undersized at 5 feet 5 inches—a factor that dissuaded many recruiters—Frankel was recruited by Northeastern head coach Dave Flint based on the recommendation of her coach at Shattuck-Saint Mary's. "Coach Flint saw potential in me, and that's something that made me feel wanted here," Frankel said. "I didn't want to go somewhere where they didn't really care if I came or not. I wanted to go where I was wanted."

Frankel posted a 10–8–2 record with a 1.92 goals against average (GAA) in 22 games. She posted a .934 save percentage (SV%) in her rookie collegiate year, leading all NCAA rookies. She made 30 saves against UConn on March 4, 2018, to backstop the Huskies to their first Hockey East title in program history. Frankel was named Hockey East Rookie of the Week and Hockey East Rookie of the Month in February 2018, and was honored as Northeastern's Top Female Newcomer at the university's "Top Dog" Awards. In her sophomore season, Frankel posted a 21–4–3 record with a 1.81 GAA and a .932 SV% in 29 starts. She opened the season with a 28-save shutout in a 5–0 victory at Boston University on October 5, 2018, becoming the first Northeastern goaltender to shutout the Terriers since Florence Schelling in 2011. Northeastern won its second consecutive Hockey East Championship, with Frankel recording 62 total saves while allowing only four goals in the semifinals and finals to win Hockey East Tournament MVP for the second consecutive season. She was named Hockey East Goaltender of the Month in October 2018 and Hockey East Player of the Month the same month. In the 2019–20 season, Frankel set Northeastern records for GAA, SV%, shutouts, and wins, her .958 SV% leading the NCAA. She was named a top-10 finalist for the 2020 Patty Kazmaier Memorial Award as well as the Beanpot's best goaltender, and was named Hockey East Goaltender of the Year for the second consecutive year.

External videos
- Aerin Frankel Receives the 2021 Bob Allen Women's Player Of The Year, USA Hockey

As a senior and alternate captain in 2020–21, Frankel led Northeastern to a 22–2–1 record, the program's first No. 1 national ranking, its fourth consecutive Hockey East championship, and its first Frozen Four appearance. She set an NCAA record with a .969 save percentage and led the nation in every major goaltending category, including a 0.81 GAA, 20 wins, .891 winning percentage, and nine shutouts. She recorded five consecutive shutouts during the season and finished with 27 career shutouts, breaking the Northeastern school record. In the NCAA Tournament, Frankel made 81 saves across three games, including 35 saves in the national championship game against Wisconsin, which Northeastern lost 2–1 in overtime. On March 27, 2021, Frankel was named the recipient of the 2021 Patty Kazmaier Memorial Award as the top player in NCAA Division I women's ice hockey, becoming the fourth goaltender in history to win the award and the third Northeastern player to earn the honor, joining Kendall Coyne Schofield (2016) and Brooke Whitney (2002). She also became the inaugural winner of the WHCA National Goalie of the Year Award by unanimous vote and was later named the Bob Allen Women's Player of the Year. Head coach Dave Flint said of Frankel: "She put up numbers this season that may never be touched and she was a huge part of our run this season to the national championship game." Frankel attributed her success to her team, saying "My individual accolades wouldn't have been possible without how great our team was this year and how well we handled the adversity that was thrown our way."

Frankel returned for a fifth season as a graduate student in 2021–22, taking advantage of the NCAA's COVID-19 eligibility relief. She posted another dominant season with a 1.06 GAA and .956 SV%, leading the nation among goaltenders who appeared in at least 20 games. She recorded an NCAA-leading 25 wins and a career-best 11 shutouts on the season. Her 25-win season vaulted her into first place in the NCAA record book for career wins in women's hockey with 103. Frankel helped Northeastern reach the NCAA Tournament for a second consecutive year, making a 48-save performance in a double-overtime victory against Minnesota Duluth in the semifinals. She became the back-to-back winner of the WHCA National Goalie of the Year Award, making her the only player to receive the award in its first two years of existence.

Frankel concluded her collegiate career holding Northeastern program records in games played (105), minutes played (6,172), GAA (1.37), save percentage (.947), shutouts (28), and wins (103). She was a three-time Hockey East Goaltender of the Year (2019, 2020, 2021), Hockey East co-Player of the Year alongside Alina Müller in 2021, and was named Hockey East Player of the Week nine times and Hockey East Defensive Player of the Week 12 times. Coach Flint called her "one of, if not the, most competitive goalies I have coached," adding that "everybody told her she's too small. She's proven a lot of people wrong."

=== Professional ===
==== PWHPA (2022–23) ====
Following her graduate year at Northeastern, Frankel joined the Professional Women's Hockey Players Association (PWHPA) for the 2022–23 season, playing for Team Adidas. The PWHPA was founded in May 2019 by over 200 players following the dissolution of the Canadian Women's Hockey League, with the goal of establishing a unified, financially sustainable professional women's hockey league in North America. PWHPA members boycotted existing leagues—including the NWHL—citing concerns over inadequate salaries, lack of health insurance, and insufficient financial stability. The PWHPA organized four region-agnostic teams—Team Adidas, Team Harvey's, Team Scotiabank, and Team Sonnet—that competed in showcase events across North America as part of the Dream Gap Tour. Team Adidas featured Kendall Coyne Schofield, Sarah Nurse, and Amanda Kessel.

Frankel made her professional hockey debut on October 16, 2022, in Montreal during the season-opening showcase. Frankel entered the season as "a highly touted prospect" with "dazzling speed" across the crease, projected to be "a star for the USA." While Team Adidas lost 5–0 to Team Scotiabank in her debut, "the highly anticipated rookie looked stronger than the scoreline showed," as she faced heavy traffic and appeared to improve throughout the game. On December 10, 2022, Frankel earned player of the game honors after posting a shutout in Team Adidas' 4–0 victory over Team Sonnet at the all-star weekend event in Ottawa. In her first professional campaign, Frankel posted a stellar .937 save percentage. The PWHPA's efforts culminated in 2022 when the organization partnered with Mark Walter and Billie Jean King, leading to the formation of the Professional Women's Hockey League (PWHL) in 2023. Upon signing with the PWHL in September 2023, Frankel reflected on her time in Boston, saying, "Boston is my home and the city that I love. Having the opportunity to play here professionally in front of the greatest sports fans is a dream come true. I am honored and extremely grateful for the opportunity to represent Boston in the PWHL."

==== Boston Fleet (2023–present) ====
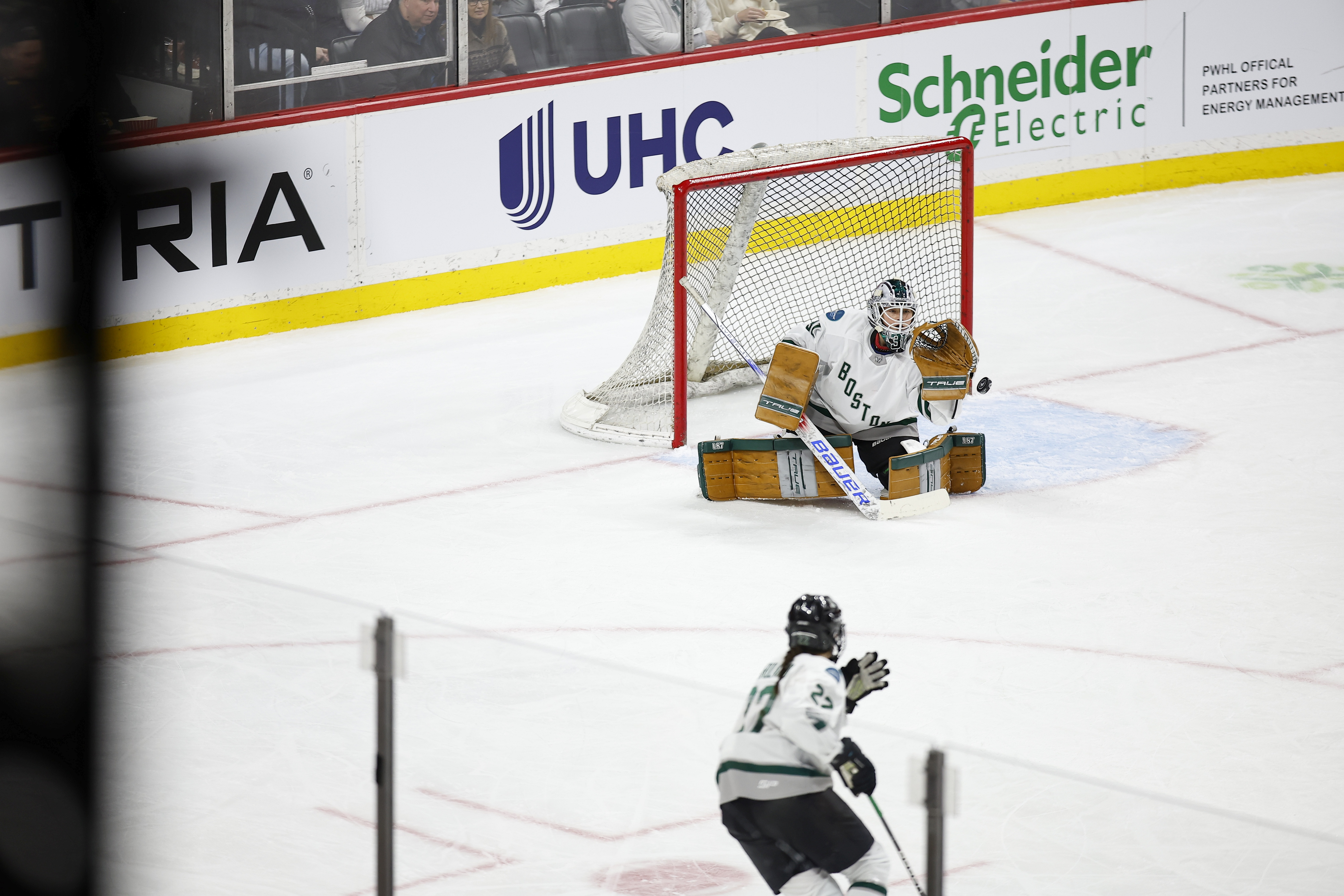
Frankel catches a shot during a game against the Minnesota Frost, February 2024

===== 2023–24 season =====
On September 7, 2023, Frankel became one of the first three players signed by PWHL Boston, agreeing to a three-year contract alongside Megan Keller and Hilary Knight. Boston general manager Danielle Marmer stated, "Aerin is an elite goalie who has proven her ability to win at every level. Not only is she the ultimate competitor on the ice, but she's the ultimate teammate off of it, and I couldn't be more excited to have her join our group as one of our first three signings in PWHL Boston history." During the inaugural PWHL season, Frankel posted an 8–6–2 record in 18 games with a .929 save percentage and 2.00 goals-against average, and was one of just three goaltenders across the league to play over 1,000 minutes. She recorded her first PWHL shutout on February 25, 2024, making 41 saves against Minnesota. Boston finished third in the league standings with a 12–3–9 record and 35 points, with Frankel winning three of her final four starts down the stretch to help clinch a playoff berth.

Frankel's performance in the 2024 PWHL Playoffs was historic. In the semifinals against second-place Montreal, she set a PWHL playoff record with 53 saves in Game 1, leading Boston to a 2–1 overtime victory despite being outshot 54–26. She broke her own record two days later in Game 2, making 57 saves in a 2–1 triple-overtime victory. Boston swept Montreal in three straight overtime games, with Frankel making 142 saves while allowing just four goals in the series. Boston coach Courtney Kessel said, "Tremendous play by her. She's a tremendous goalie that can make huge saves. She's tiny, but man, she plays like a huge goalie — just can't get that puck by her." In the Walter Cup Finals against Minnesota, Frankel continued her exceptional play, making 30 saves in Game 1 to lead Boston to a 4–3 victory. In Game 4, trailing the series 2–1, Frankel made 33 saves in a 1–0 double-overtime victory that kept Boston's championship hopes alive after benefiting from a goaltender interference call that disallowed what would have been a Minnesota game-winner. Minnesota ultimately won the series in five games, but Frankel's playoff performance was extraordinary. She played all eight playoff games with a 5–3 record, leading all goaltenders with 580:58 minutes played (over 240 minutes more than any other playoff goaltender), 286 saves, a .953 save percentage, and a 1.45 goals-against average. Boston forward Jamie Lee Rattray said, "She's been our backbone." For her stellar inaugural season performance, Frankel was named a Second Team All-Star. She was also named a finalist for the PWHL Goaltender of the Year award alongside Kristen Campbell and Corinne Schroeder.

===== 2024–25 season =====
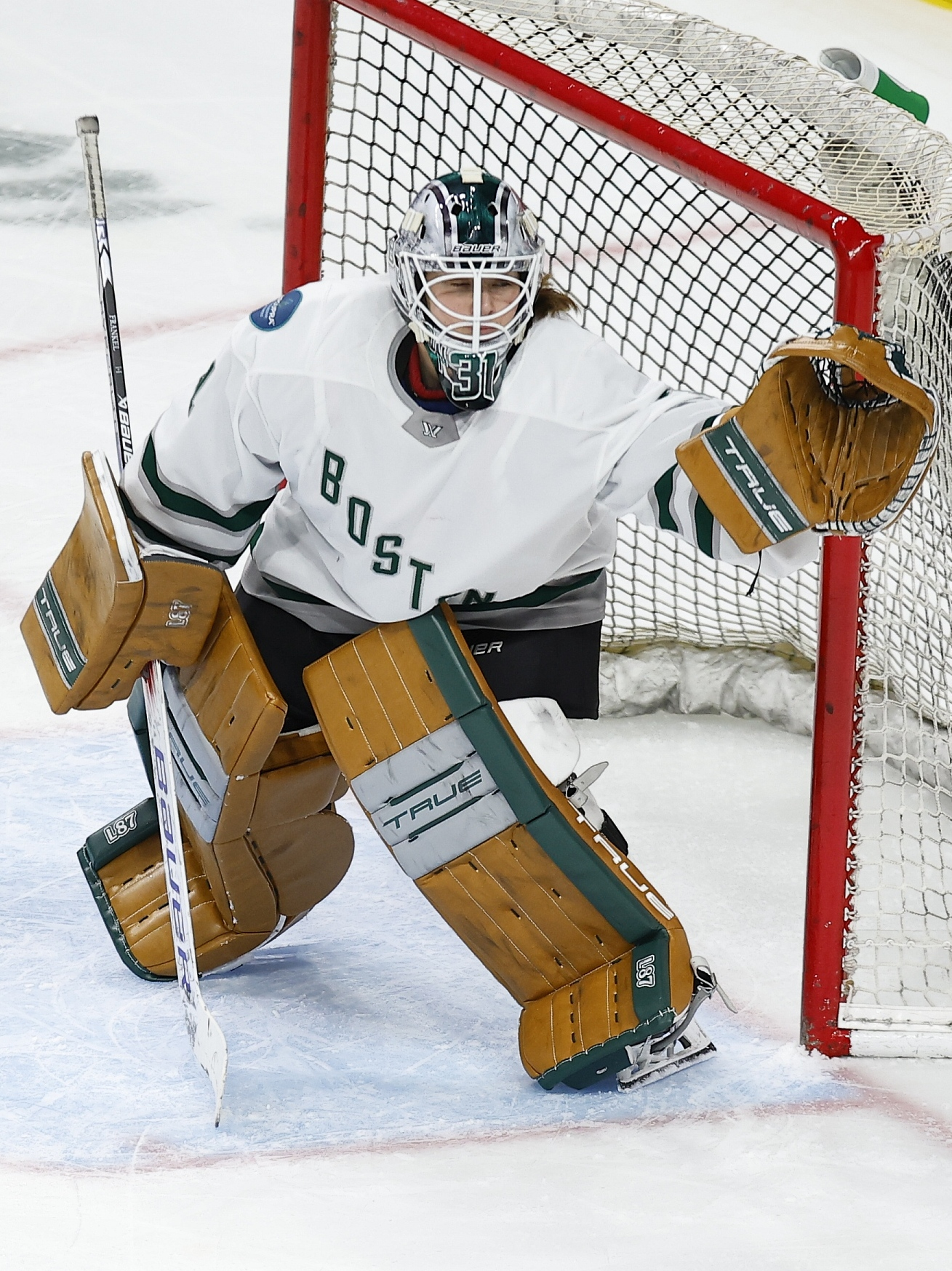
Frankel goaltending, February 2024

On January 31, 2025, Frankel became the first goaltender in PWHL history to record 1,000 saves during Boston's 3–2 shootout victory over the New York Sirens. She finished the 2024-25 regular season with a 12-win total (second in the league) and a .921 save percentage. Despite Frankel's strong play throughout the season, Boston narrowly missed the playoffs after she was forced to miss several games while recovering from an injury suffered in the 2025 World Championship gold medal game. Frankel was named a finalist for the PWHL Goaltender of the Year award alongside Ann-Renée Desbiens and Gwyneth Philips. On August 4, 2025, Frankel signed a two-year contract extension with the Fleet, keeping her in Boston through the 2027–28 season.

===== 2025–26 season =====
Frankel began the 2025–26 season in dominant fashion, helping the Boston Fleet start the season with a perfect 7–0–0 record. Through the first seven games, she recorded three shutouts, a 0.45 goals-against average, and a .985 save percentage, stopping 129 of 131 shots faced. On December 3, 2025, she recorded her second shutout of the season with 21 saves in a 2–0 victory over the Vancouver Goldeneyes, helping Boston become just the second team in PWHL history to open a season with three straight regulation wins. She stopped 70 of 71 shots through the first three games, matching her total career regular-season shutouts (two) entering the 2025–26 season in just three games. Ultimately, Frankel delivered eight regular-season shutouts, with three occurring in consecutive games. She finished the season with a .953 save percentage and 1.17 goal-against average. This strong play delivered Boston to the playoffs, where they failed to progress from the semi-finals while playing against the Ottawa Charge. Frankel was awarded the Billie Jean King MVP Award and Goaltender of the Year award for her regular season performance. In advance of the 2026 PWHL Expansion Draft, the Fleet announced that Frankel had been protected from being drafted by the new expansion franchises.

== The "Green Monster" nickname ==
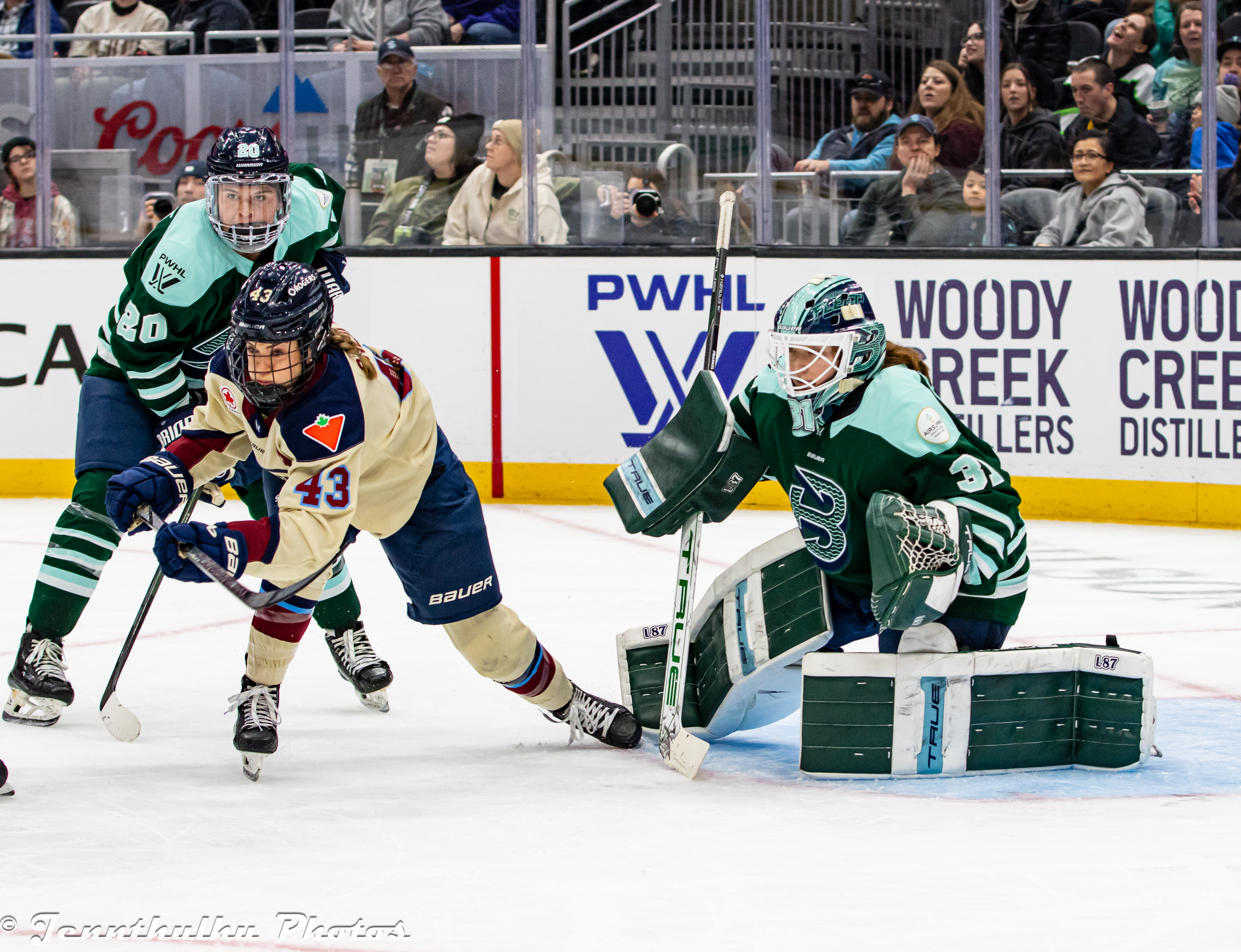
Frankel in goal during a game against Montreal, January 2025

Boston fans and media have nicknamed Frankel the "Green Monster," after the iconic 37-foot-2-inch left field wall at Fenway Park. The nickname gained popularity during the 2024 playoffs and has become widely used to describe her ability to frustrate opponents despite standing just 5 feet 5 inches tall. Boston coach Courtney Kessel embraced the nickname during the 2024 Finals, saying, "She's the Green Monster. She was tremendous."

== International play ==
=== World Championships ===
Frankel made her senior American national team debut at the 2019–20 Rivalry Series, picking up her first senior international win in December 2019. She was named to the American roster for the 2020 IIHF Women's World Championship before the tournament was cancelled due to the COVID-19 pandemic.

Frankel served as the primary goaltender at the 2023 IIHF Women's World Championship in Brampton, Ontario, where the United States captured the gold medal. Over six games, she earned a 5–0–1 record and compiled a .931 save percentage and 1.48 GAA. Frankel earned a shutout in a 3–0 victory over Germany in the quarterfinal round of the tournament. She became the first U.S. women's goaltender to start five consecutive games at an Olympics or World Championship in 26 years. The United States defeated Canada 6–3 in the gold medal game.

At the 2024 IIHF Women's World Championship in Utica, New York, Frankel started all seven games for the United States as they pursued a repeat championship on home soil. She recorded a shutout in the opening game against Switzerland, stopping all 11 shots in a 4–0 victory on April 3, 2024. Frankel finished the tournament with a .917 save percentage across seven games, backstopping the United States to the gold medal game. However, the Americans fell 6–5 in overtime to Canada, with Frankel earning a silver medal.

Frankel was named to the U.S. roster for the 2025 IIHF Women's World Championship in České Budějovice, Czech Republic, entering the tournament as what analysts called "arguably the best goaltender in the world." In the gold medal game against Canada on April 20, 2025, Frankel was involved in a collision with Canadian forward Laura Stacey outside the crease in the third period and was replaced by backup Gwyneth Philips. The United States won 4–3 in overtime on a goal by Tessa Janecke, completing a perfect 7–0 record and becoming the first U.S. team to go undefeated at a World Championship since 2019. The victory gave Frankel her second gold medal in three World Championship appearances.

Frankel started World Championship finals in 2023, 2024, and 2025, establishing herself as the primary goaltender for the United States despite not making the 2022 Olympic team.

=== Olympics ===
On January 2, 2026, she was named to team USA's roster to compete at the 2026 Winter Olympics. On February 10, Aerin Frankel made 20 saves in a 5–0 win versus Canada, marking the first time that Canada have been shutout in women's ice hockey at the Olympic Games. Frankel earned the start in the gold medal game of the 2026 Winter Olympics Games, a 2-1 overtime win versus Canada. At the 2026 Olympics, Frankel posted a 5-0 record, including a 0.39 goals against average and a .980 save percentage. During the 2026 Olympics, she also set a record for most shutouts in tournament play with three, shutting out Czechia, Canada and Sweden.

== Coaching career ==
During the 2024-25 season, Frankel served as the goaltender coach for the Stonehill Skyhawks women's ice hockey. The goalies on the Skyhawks roster during Frankel's season included Eve Stone, Kara Westlake and Alexsa Caron, who earned a place on the NEWHA All-Rookie Team. Of note, Caron set the single season record for saves (1,141) and shutouts (4), highlighted by a 61 save performance versus Ohio State on October 25, 2024, a single game program record.

== Personal life ==
Frankel studied criminal justice and psychology at Northeastern University. Frankel is also known for her love of caesar salads. Since 2024, she has undertaken a "passion project" on the Instagram account @painbyromaine, where she rates various caesar salads that she's tried.

On April 3, 2026 Frankel and men's national team player Jack Hughes both threw first pitches during the New York Yankees home opener against the Miami Marlins, with Frankel pitching to catcher J.C. Escara.

== Awards and honors ==
Honors	Year	Ref
College
NCAA All-Tournament Team	2021	
Patty Kazmaier Award	2021	
WHCA National Goalie of the Year	2021, 2022	
CCM/AHCA First Team All-American	2020, 2021	
Hockey East Goaltending Champion	2021	
Hockey East First-Team All-Star	2021	
Hockey East All-Tournament Team	2021	
Hockey East Championship MVP	2021	
Hockey East PNC Bank Three Stars Award	2021	
PWHL
PWHL Second Team All-Star	2024, 2025	
PWHL First Team All-Star	2026	
PWHL Goaltender of the Year	2026	
Billie Jean King Most Valuable Player	2026	
USA Hockey
Bob Allen Women's Player of the Year Award	2021	

== See also ==
- List of select Jewish ice hockey players

Sporting positions
Preceded by Alina Müller	Cammi Granato Award (Hockey East Player of the Year); 2021 (with Alina Müller)	Succeeded by Theresa Schafzahl
