= PWHL All-Star team =

Annual Professional Women's Hockey League honor

PWHL All-Star Team
- Sport: Ice hockey
- League: Professional Women's Hockey League
- Awarded for: Best players at each position as voted by the PWHL selection committee

History
- First award: 2023–24

The Professional Women's Hockey League All-Star teams were first named at the end of the 2023–24 PWHL season, to honor the best performers over the season at each position, as voted by the Professional Women's Hockey League (PWHL) selection committee.

== Selections ==
Key of colors and symbols
Color/symbol	Explanation
Player (X)	Denotes the number of times a player has been selected
†	Denotes players who won the Billie Jean King Most Valuable Player in the same year
‡	Denotes players inducted into the Hockey Hall of Fame

=== All-Star teams ===
^	Denotes players who are still active in the PWHL
*	Denotes players inducted into the Hockey Hall of Fame
†	Denotes inactive players not yet eligible for Hockey Hall of Fame consideration
Player (X)	Denotes the number of times a player has been selected
**Player** **(in bold text)**	Denotes players who won the Billie Jean King Award as the most valuable player in the same year

Season	Pos	First Team		Second Team	
Season	Pos	Player	Team	Player	Team
2024	F	Alex Carpenter^	New York	Brianne Jenner^	Ottawa
2024	F	Marie-Philip Poulin^	Montreal	Sarah Nurse^	Toronto
2024	F	**Natalie Spooner**^	Toronto	Grace Zumwinkle^	Minnesota
2024	D	Erin Ambrose^	Montreal	Renata Fast^	Toronto
2024	D	Ella Shelton^	New York	Megan Keller^	Boston
2024	G	Kristen Campbell^	Toronto	Aerin Frankel^	Boston
2024–25	F	Sarah Fillier^	New York Sirens	Kendall Coyne Schofield^	Minnesota Frost
2024–25	F	Hilary Knight^	Boston Fleet	Tereza Vanišová^	Ottawa Charge
2024–25	F	**Marie-Philip Poulin**^ (2)	Montreal Victoire	Daryl Watts^	Toronto Sceptres
2024–25	D	Renata Fast^ (2)	Toronto Sceptres	Ella Shelton^ (2)	New York Sirens
2024–25	D	Sophie Jaques^	Minnesota Frost	Claire Thompson^	Minnesota Frost
2024–25	G	Ann-Renée Desbiens^	Montreal Victoire	Aerin Frankel^ (2)	Boston Fleet
2025–26	F	Taylor Heise^	Minnesota Frost	Britta Curl-Salemme^	Minnesota Frost
2025–26	F	Brianne Jenner^ (2)	Ottawa Charge	Rebecca Leslie^	Ottawa Charge
2025–26	F	Kelly Pannek^	Minnesota Frost	Laura Stacey^	Montreal Victoire
2025–26	D	Sophie Jaques^ (2)	Vancouver Goldeneyes	Nicole Gosling^	Montreal Victoire
2025–26	D	Megan Keller^ (2)	Boston Fleet	Haley Winn^	Boston Fleet
2025–26	G	**Aerin Frankel**^ (3)	Boston Fleet	Ann-Renée Desbiens^ (2)	Montreal Victoire

=== All-Rookie teams ===
^	Denotes players who are still active in the PWHL
*	Denotes players who have been inducted into the Hockey Hall of Fame as a player
†	Denotes inactive players not yet eligible for Hockey Hall of Fame consideration
**Player** (in bold text)	Indicates the player who won the Rookie of the Year award
Player (in italic text)	Indicates the player who was drafted first overall

Season	Pos	Player	Team
2024	F	Emma Maltais^	Toronto
2024	F	Alina Müller^	Boston
2024	F	**Grace Zumwinkle**^	Minnesota
2024	D	Ashton Bell^	Ottawa
2024	D	Sophie Jaques^	Minnesota
2024	G	Emma Söderberg^	Boston
2024–25	F	Britta Curl-Salemme^	Minnesota Frost
2024–25	F	**Sarah Fillier**^	New York Sirens
2024–25	F	Jennifer Gardiner^	Montreal Victoire
2024–25	D	Cayla Barnes^	Montreal Victoire
2024–25	D	Anna Wilgren^	Montreal Victoire
2024–25	G	Gwyneth Philips^	Ottawa Charge
2025–26	F	Kristýna Kaltounková^	New York Sirens
2025–26	F	Abby Newhook^	Boston Fleet
2025–26	F	Casey O'Brien^	New York Sirens
2025–26	D	Nicole Gosling^	Montreal Victoire
2025–26	D	**Haley Winn**^	Boston Fleet
2025–26	G	Hannah Murphy^	Seattle Torrent
