= Hockey East =

Ice hockey conference in New England, US

Hockey East Association
- Association: NCAA
- Founded: 1984
- Commissioner: Steve Metcalf
- Sports fielded: Ice hockey; men's: 11 teams; women's: 10 teams
- Division: Division I
- No. of teams: 12
- Headquarters: Amesbury, Massachusetts, U.S.
- Region: New England
- Website: http://www.hockeyeastonline.com

Locations

The Hockey East Association, also known as Hockey East, is a college ice hockey conference operating entirely in New England. It participates in the NCAA's Division I as a hockey-only conference.

Hockey East came into existence in 1984 for men's hockey when most of its current members split from what is today known as ECAC Hockey, after disagreements with the Ivy League members. The women's league began play in 2002.

On October 5, 2011, the University of Notre Dame Fighting Irish (an ACC member outside football) announced they would join Hockey East as the conference's first non-New England school in 2013 after the CCHA folded. On March 22, 2016, Notre Dame subsequently announced their men's hockey team would leave Hockey East for the Big Ten Conference at the start of the 2017–2018 season. The University of Connecticut (UConn) and Hockey East jointly announced on June 21, 2012, that UConn's men's team, then in Atlantic Hockey, would join the school's women's team in Hockey East in 2014. On October 24, 2013, Merrimack College, already a member of the Hockey East men's league, announced that it would upgrade its women's team from club level to full varsity status effective in 2015 and join the Hockey East women's league.

On May 2, 2017, the College of the Holy Cross announced that it would join Hockey East for women's hockey only starting in 2018–19.

== Members ==
There are currently 12 member schools, with 11 participating in the men's division and 10 in the women's division.

Institution	Location	Founded	Affiliation	Enrollment	Endowment	Primary Conference	Nickname (men's)	Nickname (women's)	Colors
Boston College	Chestnut Hill, Massachusetts	1863	Private/Catholic (Jesuit)	14,640	$4,236,200,000	ACC	Eagles	Eagles	
Boston University	Boston, Massachusetts	1839	Private/Non-sectarian (formerly Methodist)	31,766	$4,016,142,000	Patriot League	Terriers	Terriers	
University of Connecticut	Storrs, Connecticut	1881	Public	32,669	$668,561,000	Big East	Huskies	Huskies	
College of the Holy Cross	Worcester, Massachusetts	1843	Private/Catholic (Jesuit)	2,787	$1,207,691,000	Patriot League	✗	Crusaders	
University of Maine	Orono, Maine	1865	Public	11,222	$442,200,000	America East	Black Bears	Black Bears	
University of Massachusetts Amherst	Amherst, Massachusetts	1863	Public	27,269	$672,000,000	MAC	Minutemen	✗	
University of Massachusetts Lowell	Lowell, Massachusetts	1894	Public	18,369	$200,000,000	America East	River Hawks	✗	
Merrimack College	North Andover, Massachusetts	1947	Private/Catholic (Augustinian)	5,418	$97,400,667	Metro	Warriors	Warriors	
University of New Hampshire	Durham, New Hampshire	1866	Public	14,761	$576,700,000	America East	Wildcats	Wildcats	
Northeastern University	Boston, Massachusetts	1898	Private/Non-sectarian	22,456	$2,102,000,000	CAA	Huskies	Huskies	
Providence College	Providence, Rhode Island	1917	Private/Catholic (Dominican)	4,816	$352,820,557	Big East	Friars	Friars	
University of Vermont	Burlington, Vermont	1791	Public	11,999	$972,000,000	America East	Catamounts	Catamounts	

=== Former member ===
Institution	Location	Nickname	Joined	Left	Conference left for	Current conference	Colors
University of Notre Dame	Notre Dame, Indiana	Fighting Irish (Men)	2013	2017	Big Ten (affiliate)		

=== Membership timeline ===
Men Women Both

== Conference records ==
=== Men's ===
Teams' records against current conference opponents.

School	Boston College			Boston University			Connecticut			Maine			Massachusetts			Massachusetts Lowell			Merrimack			New Hampshire			Northeastern			Providence			Vermont			Total			
School	W	L	T	W	L	T	W	L	T	W	L	T	W	L	T	W	L	T	W	L	T	W	L	T	W	L	T	W	L	T	W	L	T	W	L	T	Win%
Boston College				131	139	21	15	7	2	72	55	10	74	23	4	70	47	11	76	27	7	80	68	16	174	59	18	121	54	17	50	18	8	863	497	114	.624
Boston University	136	128	20				10	6	2	68	55	14	65	14	7	78	34	11	92	22	8	113	52	21	167	64	11	111	59	19	53	24	10	893	458	123	.648
Connecticut	3	13	2	6	10	2				8	6	4	15	40	4	11	27	3	8	27	5	11	16	1	5	12	0	4	13	3	24	8	1	95	172	25	.368
Maine	51	71	9	55	68	14	6	8	4				57	25	10	81	46	5	72	22	10	70	56	12	58	53	19	67	58	7	29	29	8	546	436	98	.551
Massachusetts	17	74	4	14	70	8	43	18	4	28	58	10				36	50	9	51	45	8	29	93	12	37	57	10	35	52	8	32	44	10	322	561	83	.376
Massachusetts Lowell	45	69	10	34	78	11	27	11	3	46	81	5	49	32	7				81	41	12	45	65	18	63	51	10	49	62	11	35	17	8	474	507	95	.485
Merrimack	23	75	7	22	92	8	27	8	5	22	72	10	43	46	8	41	81	12				28	80	12	43	63	12	35	91	12	18	19	8	302	627	94	.341
New Hampshire	66	77	16	52	113	21	16	11	1	56	70	12	91	27	12	65	45	18	80	28	12				98	71	17	91	65	16	82	27	10	696	534	135	.559
Northeastern	55	171	16	64	167	11	12	5	0	53	58	19	56	34	10	51	63	10	63	43	12	71	98	17				56	90	20	30	34	8	511	763	123	.410
Providence	53	121	14	59	111	19	13	4	3	58	67	7	48	31	8	62	49	11	91	35	12	65	91	16	90	56	20				28	28	11	567	593	121	.490
Vermont	16	49	7	24	53	10	8	24	1	29	29	8	44	30	8	17	35	8	19	18	8	27	82	10	34	30	8	28	28	11				246	378	79	.406

Note: Northeastern defeated Boston University in the 2020 Beanpot championship in double overtime. However, due to NCAA rules about non-postseason games, the match is officially recorded as a tie.

Massachusetts records a loss against Providence on February 9, 1931. The game was actually played against Brown at Providence, Rhode Island.

== Men's Championships ==
The Hockey East Championship Game has been held in Boston since 1987. Originally held at the Boston Garden, it moved to TD Garden in 1996. Prior to moving to Boston, the first two men's Hockey East championships were held in Providence, Rhode Island at the Providence Civic Center.

The semifinal and final games are held on consecutive nights in mid-March at TD Garden. The quarterfinal round takes place the previous weekend, and the opening round is the midweek prior to the quarterfinals. Eight teams in the league advance to the quarterfinal round. In the opening round, seeds six, seven, and eight host seeds 11, 10, and nine, respectively. After a reseeding, the top three seeds host the winners of the Opening Round while the four seed hosts the five seed in the Quarterfinals.

=== Championships, Frozen Fours, and NCAA Tournament Appearances ===
School	NCAA Championships	NCAA Runner-Up	NCAA Frozen Fours	NCAA Tournament Appearances	Conference Championships	Conference Tournament Championships
Boston College	5 (1949, 2001, 2008, 2010, 2012)	7 (1965, 1978, 1998, 2000, 2006, 2007, 2024)	26 (1948-50, 1954, 1956, 1959, 1963, 1965, 1968, 1973, 1978, 1985, 1990, 1998-2001, 2004, 2006-08, 2010, 2012, 2014, 2016, 2024)	38 (1948-50, 1954, 1956, 1959, 1963, 1965, 1968, 1973, 1978, 1984-87, 1989-91, 1998-2001, 2003-08, 2010-16, 2021, 2024, 2025)	22 (1980, 1981, 1984-87, 1989-91, 2001, 2003-05, 2011, 2012, 2014, 2016-18, 2020, 2024, 2025)	14 (1965, 1978, 1987, 1990, 1998, 1999, 2001, 2005, 2007, 2008, 2010-12, 2024)
Boston University	5 (1971, 1972, 1978, 1995, 2009)	7 (1950, 1967, 1991, 1994, 1997, 2015, 2025)	25 (1950, 1951, 1953, 1960, 1966, 1967, 1971, 1972, 1974-78, 1990, 1991, 1993-97, 2009, 2015, 2023-25)	40 (1950, 1951, 1953, 1960, 1966, 1967, 1971, 1972, 1974-78, 1984, 1986, 1990-98, 2000, 2002, 2003, 2005-07, 2009, 2012, 2015-18, 2021, 2023-25)	22 (1938, 1939, 1947, 1948, 1950, 1965, 1967, 1971, 1976, 1978, 1979, 1994-98, 2000, 2006, 2009, 2015, 2017, 2023)	17 (1951, 1952, 1972, 1974-77, 1986, 1991, 1994, 1995, 1997, 2006, 2009, 2015, 2018, 2023)
Connecticut				2 (2025, 2026)		
Maine	2 (1993, 1999)	3 (1995, 2002, 2004)	11 (1988, 1989, 1991, 1993, 1995, 1999, 2000, 2002, 2004, 2006, 2007)	19 (1987-91, 1993, 1995, 1999-2007, 2012, 2024, 2025)	3 (1988, 1993, 1995)	6 (1989, 1992, 1993, 2000, 2004, 2025)
Massachusetts	1 (2021)	1 (2019)	2 (2019, 2021)	6 (2007, 2019, 2021, 2022, 2024, 2025)	1 (2019)	2 (2021, 2022)
Massachusetts Lowell			1 (2013)	9 (1988, 1994, 1996, 2012-14, 2016, 2017, 2022)	2 (2013, 2017)	3 (2013, 2014, 2017)
Merrimack				4 (1988, 2011, 2023, 2026)		1 (2026)
New Hampshire		2 (1999, 2003)	7 (1977, 1979, 1982, 1998, 1999, 2002, 2003)	22 (1977, 1979, 1982, 1983, 1992, 1994, 1995, 1997-2000, 2002-11, 2013)	8 (1992, 1997, 1999, 2002, 2003, 2007, 2008, 2010)	3 (1979, 2002, 2003)
Northeastern			1 (1982)	8 (1982, 1988, 1994, 2009, 2016, 2018, 2019, 2022)	1 (2022)	4 (1982, 1988, 2016, 2019)
Providence	1 (2015)	1 (1985)	5 (1964, 1983, 1985, 2015, 2019)	16 (1964, 1978, 1981, 1983, 1985, 1989, 1991, 1996, 2001, 2014-19, 2025)	4 (1964, 1983, 2016, 2026)	4 (1964, 1981, 1985, 1996)
Vermont			2 (1996, 2009)	6 (1988, 1996, 1997, 2009, 2010, 2014)	1 (1996)	

== Women's Championships ==
The Hockey East Championship was held in Boston from its inception in 2003 until 2007. The event was held at Northeastern's Matthews Arena in 2003 and 2004 before moving to BU's Walter Brown Arena in 2005. The tournament returned to Matthews Arena in 2006, was held at UNH's Whittemore Center in 2007, and at UConn's Mark Edward Freitas Ice Forum in 2008. The tournament went back to UNH in 2009, Providence in 2010, and the last campus to host was Boston University in 2011. The tournament moved to Hyannis, Massachusetts in 2012, and Lawler Arena on the Merrimack College campus in North Andover, Massachusetts in 2016.

=== Championships, Frozen Fours, and NCAA Tournament Appearances ===
School	NCAA Championships	NCAA Runner-Up	NCAA Frozen Fours	NCAA Tournament Appearances	Conference Championships	Conference Tournament Championships
Boston College		1 (2016)	7 (2007, 2011-13, 2015-17)	11 (2007, 2011-19, 2021)	5 (2014-18)	3 (2011, 2016, 2017)
Boston University		2 (2011, 2013)	2 (2011, 2013)	7 (2010-15, 2025)	2 (2011, 2013)	6 (2010, 2012-15, 2025)
Connecticut				2 (2024, 2026)	2 (2024, 2025)	2 (2024, 2026)
Holy Cross						
Maine						
Merrimack						
New Hampshire			2 (2006, 2008)	5 (2006-10)	4 (2006-09)	5 (1986, 1987, 1990, 1991, 1996)
Northeastern		1 (2021)	3 (2021-23)	6 (2016, 2018, 2019, 2021-23)	7 (2012, 2019, 2020-23, 2026)	9 (1988, 1989, 1997, 2018-23)
Providence				2 (2005, 2021)	1 (2010)	5 (1985, 1992-95)
Vermont						

== Rivalries ==
Boston College, Boston University, and Northeastern all take part in the annual Beanpot tournament with Harvard of ECAC Hockey.

The previously existing rivalry between Boston College and Notre Dame, the Holy War on Ice, became a conference matchup with Notre Dame's arrival in Hockey East. The two are rivals in other sports as well, as both are members of the Atlantic Coast Conference for most sports (though Notre Dame's football team remains independent, they play BC in that sport on a regular basis). Maine also has a rivalry with New Hampshire, often called "The Border War". Providence and UConn also have a rivalry which spills over from the basketball court.

Rivalry Name	Trophy	Meetings	Began	Last
Boston University-Maine men's ice hockey rivalry		135	1979	2025
Green Line Rivalry		282	1918	2025
Holy War on Ice	Lefty Smith - John "Snooks" Kelley Memorial Trophy	46	1969	2024
Maine-New Hampshire men's ice hockey rivalry		135	1979	2025
UConn-UMass rivalry		71	1929	2025

== Conference arenas ==
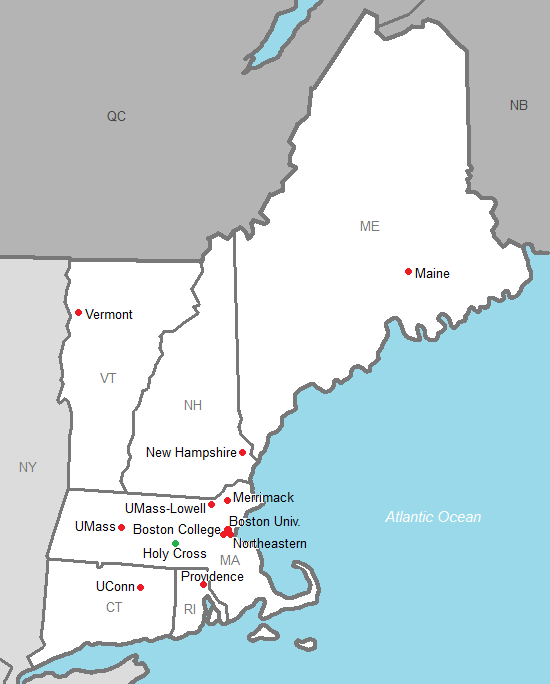
Hockey East membership beginning in 2017-18. Holy Cross (in green) joined the women's league in 2018-2019.

School	Hockey Arena	Capacity	Opened
Boston College	Silvio O. Conte Forum	7,884	1988
Boston University	Agganis Arena (men); Walter Brown Arena (women)	6,224; 3,806	2005; 1971
Connecticut	Toscano Family Ice Forum	2,600	2023
Holy Cross	Hart Center at the Luth Athletic Complex	1,600	1975
Maine	Harold Alfond Sports Arena	5,641	1977
Massachusetts	William D. Mullins Memorial Center	8,329	1993
Massachusetts Lowell	Tsongas Center at UMass Lowell	6,496	1998
Merrimack	Lawler Arena at Merrimack Athletics Complex	2,549	1972
New Hampshire	Whittemore Center Arena	6,501	1995
Northeastern	Various (Note: Northeastern closed its former home of Matthews Arena in December 2025. The university started demolition of the arena in March 2026 in preparation for a new arena (hockey capacity 4,050) set to open in 2028. During this period, the Huskies will play "home" games at several regional venues.)	—N/a	—N/a
Providence	Schneider Arena	3,030	1973
Vermont	Albert L. Gutterson Fieldhouse	4,003	1963

== Awards ==
=== Men's ===
At the conclusion of each regular season schedule, the coaches of each Hockey East team vote which players they choose to be on the three All-Conference Teams: first team, second team and rookie team (except for 1985–86 when no rookie team was selected). They also vote to award up to 6 individual trophies to an eligible player at the same time. Hockey East also awards a Conference Tournament Most Valuable Player and names a tournament all-star team, which are voted on at the conclusion of the conference tournament. Four of these awards have been bestowed every year that Hockey East has been in operation. In addition, the Scoring Champion and Goaltending Champions are named based solely on statistics the players made during the season.

=== All-Conference Teams ===
Award	Inaugural Year
First Team	1984–85
Second Team	1984–85
Third Team	2016–17
Rookie Team	1984–85
All-Tournament Team	1985

=== Individual awards ===
Award	Inaugural Year
Player of the Year	1984–85
Rookie of the Year	1984–85
Bob Kullen Coach of the Year Award	1984–85
Len Ceglarski Sportsmanship Award	1991–92
Best Defensive Forward	1996–97
Best Defensive Defenseman	1998–99
Three-Stars Award	2000–01
Goaltending Champion	1984–85
Scoring Champion	1984–85
William Flynn Tournament Most Valuable Player	1985

=== Team Awards ===
Award	Inaugural Year
Lamoriello Trophy	1988
Charlie Holt Team Sportsmanship Award	1991-92

=== Women's ===
The award for the top HEA player each year is the Cammi Granato Award, awarded since 2009. The NCAA Division I Women's Ice Hockey Player of the year, the Patty Kazmaier Award, has been won by HEA players Brooke Whitney (Northeastern) in 2002, Alex Carpenter (Boston College) in 2015, Kendall Coyne (Northeastern) in 2016, Daryl Watts (Boston College) in 2018, and Aerin Frankel (Northeastern) in 2021.

== Television rights ==
Since the 2019–2020 season, Hockey East games have aired regionally on NESN and are available in the rest of the United States and in Canada on Paramount+ and SportsLive.

Games previously aired nationally on NBCSN through the 2016 Hockey East Championship game, and on American Sports Network before the service's closure.

On April 6, 2022, Hockey East reached a six-year media rights agreement with ESPN and ESPN+ that will bring games to ESPN's television and streaming platforms;

- 300 games per season with all contests available on ESPN+.
- 3 games per season that will air on ESPNU.
