= Hilary Witt =

American ice hockey player

Medal record

Representing United States

Women's ice hockey

IIHF World Women's Championships
Silver medal – second place	2001	Tournament

Hilary Witt is the head coach of the University of New Hampshire women's hockey team. Witt is a member of the Massachusetts Hockey Hall of Fame and Northeastern's Hall of Fame.

== Playing career ==
Witt came to Northeastern University in 1996 with a strong athletic resume from Canton High School in Canton, Massachusetts. In hockey she played on the Assabet Valley Club team for four years while they won two National Championships. In her freshman year, she helped the Huskies to a 27–9 season and the 1997 ECAC Championship. Witt scored two goals, including the game winner, in the 3–2 title win over New Hampshire and as a rookie was named the tournament MVP. She led the team in scoring that season with 24 goals.

In Witt's sophomore season she led the team in scoring once again with 32 goals, and her 58 points (ranked in the nation's top 10). She was a nominee for the Patty Kazmaier Award. She was also voted All-ECAC. The team went 26–6–5 and qualified for the ECAC Tournament and the semifinals of the first ever women's hockey National Championship.

As a junior, Witt led NU with 27 goals, and was in the nation's top 10 in scoring. Once again, she was a Kazmaier nominee. The team went 25–7–3 and went on to the ECAC Tournament. Witt captained Northeastern's 1999–2000 team to a 22–9–3 season and another post-season appearance. She led NU in scoring with 30 goals for the fourth consecutive year. In terms of scoring, was in the nation's top 10, and was voted All-ECAC. Also, for the third year in a row she was a Kazmaier candidate.

She was a member of the U.S. National Team in 2001. On February 10, 2010, she was inducted into the Women's Beanpot Hall of Fame. Witt is Northeastern's all-time leading scorer and helped the Huskies to a pair of Beanpot championships (1997 and 1998) along with the 1997 ECAC championship. She had 20 career points in Beanpot competition, also a Northeastern record. Overall, she totaled 113 goals, 95 assists and 208 points for her career (1997–2000). Her career totals of 113 goals and 208 points are second all time among Huskies players, behind Kendall Coyne. Witt's 95 assists rank third overall. She is Northeastern's all-time leader for career power play goals with 33. During her career at Northeastern, the team won 100 games, lost 31 and tied 11, while qualifying for the post-season every year.

== Coaching career ==
Witt joined the Yale Bulldogs as an assistant coach in 2001–02 and became head coach the following season. She was named ECAC Women's Coach of the Year in 2002–03, and became Yale's all-time leader in wins in 2005. Witt was an assistant coach for Team USA at the 2006 Four Nations Cup. The 2004–05 squad set the school record for overall wins (16) and conference wins (12), earning a trip to the ECAC semifinals for the first time. The 2007–08 team broke the school record for goals in a season with 96 and finished with the second-most wins in school history, 15. Witt announced that she was leaving Yale in June 2010.

On April 23, 2014, Witt was introduced as the head coach at the University of New Hampshire.

=== Coaching record ===
Year	Wins	Losses	Ties	Coach	Postseason
2009–10				Hilary Witt	
2008–09	12	16	1	Hilary Witt	
2007–08	11	14	6	Hilary Witt	
2006–07	15	14	2	Hilary Witt	
2005–06	11	15	5	Hilary Witt	
2004–05	16	15	1	Hilary Witt	
2003–04	12	16	3	Hilary Witt	
2002–03	9	20	2	Hilary Witt	

== Awards and honors ==
- 1997 ECAC Tournament Most Valuable Player
- ECAC Women's Coach of the Year in 2002–03
- Witt was a three-time finalist for the Patty Kazmaier Award as the top women's player in college hockey.
- 2010 Inductee, Women's Beanpot Hall of Fame

== See also ==
- List of college women's ice hockey career coaching wins leaders
