= Brooke Whitney =

American ice hockey player

- Born: October 12, 1979 (age 45); Snohomish, Washington, USA
- Height: 5 ft 5 in (165 cm)
- Weight: 155 lb (70 kg; 11 st 1 lb)
- Position: Forward
- Played for: Brampton Thunder (NWHL); Northeastern Huskies (ECAC)
- National team: United States
- Playing career: 1998–2003

Brooke Whitney (born October 12, 1979 in Snohomish, Washington) is a former ice hockey player for the Northeastern Huskies. In 2002, she was awarded the Patty Kazmaier Award.

== Playing career ==
Whitney's freshman season at Northeastern was in 1999-2000. Despite missing half the season to a broken ankle, she ranked second in team scoring with 34 points. On October 8 and 9, she opened the season with two game-winning goals against Ohio State. In 2001-02, Whitney was awarded the Patty Kazmaier Award. She had a point in at least 28 games during the season, and finished the season with 32 goals, and 56 points. While at Northeastern, she was also recognized academically when she was awarded the Jeanne L. Rowlands Top-Scholar Athlete Award. Whitney participated in the 2002 Four Nations Cup and was a member of the U.S. Women's National Team in 2004. Whitney was also a member of the Brampton Thunder in the 2002-03 NWHL season. She also participated in the Greater Seattle Hockey League and accumulated 17 goals and 8 assists in 12 games.

== Coaching career ==
Whitney was a graduate assistant coach for the University of Connecticut's women's ice hockey team in the 2004-05 season. In addition, she was a former assistant coach for the Boston College Eagles.

== Awards and honors ==
- Second-team All-America selection (2000–01)
- All-ECAC first team selection (2001–02)
- ECAC All-Academic team (1998–1999)
- ECAC All-Academic team (2001–2002)
- ECAC Player of the Year (2002)
- Everett Herald Woman of the Year in Sports Award (2002–2003)
- Jeanne Rowlands Award, given to Northeastern's top senior scholar-athlete for the 2001-02 athletic season
- Northeastern Hall of Fame
- Patty Kazmaier Memorial Award (2002)
- USCHO Player of the Week (Week of December 5, 2001)

Awards and achievements
Preceded by Jennifer Botterill	Patty Kazmaier Award; 2001–02	Succeeded by Jennifer Botterill
