= 2012–13 Mercyhurst Lakers women's ice hockey season =

Regular Season Conference Champions CHA Tournament Champions Defeated Cornell 4-3 (OT) in Quarterfinal Game, Lost to Boston University 4-1 in Frozen Four
- Conference: 1st CHA
- Home ice: Mercyhurst Ice Center

Rankings
- USA Today/USA Hockey Magazine: 5th
- USCHO.com/CBS College Sports: 5th

Record
- Overall: 29-7-1
- Conference: 17-3-0
- Home: 13-3-0
- Road: 12-3-1
- Neutral: 4-1-0

Coaches and captains
- Head coach: Michael Sisti (14th season)
- Assistant coaches: Louis Goulet; Kelly Paton; Delaney Collins
- Captain: Christine Bestland
- Alternate captain(s): Gina Buquet; Lauren Jones; Kelsey Welch

The Mercyhurst Lakers women's hockey team represented Mercyhurst College in the 2012–13 NCAA Division I women's ice hockey season. The Lakers were coached by Michael Sisti and advanced to the NCAA Frozen Four, before being defeated by Boston University 4-1 in the National Semifinal.

2012–13 College Hockey America standings
	Conference record							Overall record					
	GP	W	L	T	PTS	GF	GA	GP	W	L	T	GF	GA
#5 Mercyhurst^{†*}	20	17	3	0	34	96	27	37	29	7	1	153	65
Syracuse	20	13	6	1	27	54	32	36	20	15	1	97	74
RIT	20	7	8	5	19	41	45	37	16	16	5	96	79
Robert Morris	20	9	10	1	19	52	50	33	15	15	3	81	77
Lindenwood	20	7	10	3	17	41	71	36	7	26	3	61	151
Penn State	20	1	17	2	4	22	81	35	7	26	2	69	109
Champion: Mercyhurst † indicates conference regular season champion; * indicates conference tournament champion Final rankings: USCHO.com Poll

== Offseason ==
Junior Forward Christine Bestland and Sophomore Forward Shelby Bram were invited to the Team Canada U22 Development selection camp. Bram was ultimately chosen to the team, and faced off against the US U22 Women, which included Mercyhurst graduate Kelley Steadman. Team USA swept the three game series.

=== Recruiting ===
Player	Position	Nationality	Notes
Jaclyn Arbour	Forward	United States	Attended the National Sports Academy
Hannah Bale	Forward	Canada	Part of Team Ontario's Under-18 roster
Jenna Dingeldein	Forward	Canada	Played for the Mississauga Jr. Chiefs
Julia DiTondo	Goaltender	United States	Played for Nichols prep and the Buffalo Bisons
Kathy Donohue	Forward	United States	Played for the North American Hockey Academy
Emily Janiga	Forward	United States	Played for Burlington Barracudas
Lauren Kilroy	Defense	United States	Assistant captain for the North American Hockey Academy
J'nai Mahadeo	Defense	Canada	Participated at the Edge School
Maggie Rothgery	Forward	United States	Two-time USA Hockey National Camp invitee

=== Transfers ===
Player	Position	Nationality	Notes
Kaleigh Chippy	Forward	United States	Niagara Purple Eagles
Jenna Hendrikx	Forward	Canada	Niagara Purple Eagles
Kelsey Welch	Forward	United States	Niagara Purple Eagles

== Roster ==
=== 2012–13 Lakers ===
No.	Nat.	Player	Class	Pos	Height	DoB	Hometown	Previous team
3		Vaila Higson	Sophomore	F	5' 5" (1.65 m)		Grande Prairie, Alberta	Edge School
4		Emily Janiga	Freshman	F	5' 10" (1.78 m)		East Aurora, New York	Nichols School
5		Molly Byrne	Sophomore	D	5' 9" (1.75 m)		Plymouth, Minnesota	Shattuck-St. Mary's
6		Gina Buquet (A)	Senior	F	5' 6" (1.68 m)		Lafayette, Louisiana	Wayne State University
7		Hannah Bale	Freshman	F	5' 11" (1.8 m)		Oakville, Ontario	Stoney Creek Jr. Sabres
8		Kaleigh Chippy	Junior	F	5' 10" (1.78 m)		Cleveland, Ohio	Niagara University
9		Kelsey Welch (A)	Senior	F	5' 9" (1.75 m)		East Amherst, New York	Niagara University
10		Lauren Jones (A)	Senior	F	5' 9" (1.75 m)		Bloomington, Illinois	National Sports Academy
11		Kristine Grenier	Sophomore	F	5' 8" (1.73 m)		St. Leon, Manitoba	Pembina Valley Hawks
12		Jenna Hendrikx	Senior	F	6' 0" (1.83 m)		Metcalfe, Ontario	Niagara University
14		Maggie Rothgery	Freshman	F	5' 7" (1.7 m)		Elyria, Ohio	Ohio Flames
16		Jenna Dingeldein	Freshman	F	6' 1" (1.85 m)		Toronto, Ontario	Toronto Aeros
18		J'nai Mahadeo	Freshman	D	5' 8" (1.73 m)		Airdrie, Alberta	Edge School
19		Stephanie Desutter	Senior	D	6' 0" (1.83 m)		Aylmer, Ontario	Culver Academies
20		Kathy Donohue	Freshman	F	5' 5" (1.65 m)		Rochester, New York	North American Hockey Academy
21		Christie Cicero	Junior	F	5' 4" (1.63 m)		Manalapan, New Jersey	New Jersey Rockets
24		Jaclyn Arbour	Freshman	F	5' 9" (1.75 m)		South Setauket, New York	National Sports Academy
26		Caroline Luczak	Sophomore	D	5' 10" (1.78 m)		Midhurst, Ontario	Toronto Jr. Aeros
27		Christine Bestland (C)	Junior	F	5' 9" (1.75 m)		Brunkild, Manitoba	Pursuit of Excellence
28		Lauren Kilroy	Freshman	D	5' 7" (1.7 m)		Cypress, California	North American Hockey Academy
29		Julia DiTondo	Freshman	G	5' 10" (1.78 m)		Kenmore, New York	Nichols School
31		Shelby Bram	Sophomore	F	5' 3" (1.6 m)		Ste. Anne, Manitoba	Eastman Selects
34		Amanda Makela	Sophomore	G	5' 9" (1.75 m)		Thunder Bay, Ontario	Thunder Bay Queens
35		Stephanie Ciampa	Senior	G	5' 8" (1.73 m)		Peabody, Massachusetts	Tabor Academy

== Schedule ==
Date	Opponent^{#}	Rank^{#}	Site	Decision	Result	Record
Regular Season
September 28	at RIT	#10	Frank Ritter Memorial Ice Arena • Rochester, NY	Amanda Makela	W 2–4	1–0–0 (1–0–0)
September 29	at RIT	#10	Frank Ritter Memorial Ice Arena • Rochester, NY	Stephanie Ciampa	W 7–0	2–0–0 (2–0–0)
October 5	at Quinnipiac*	#9	TD Bank Sports Center • Hamden, CT	Amanda Makela	T 4–4 ^{OT}	2–0–1
October 6	at Quinnipiac*	#9	TD Bank Sports Center • Hamden, CT	Stephanie Ciampa	W 4–3	3–0–1
October 12	Providence*	#9	Mercyhurst Ice Center • Erie, PA	Amanda Makela	W 6–3	4–0–1
October 13	Providence*	#9	Mercyhurst Ice Center • Erie, PA	Stephanie Ciampa	W 5–0	5–0–1
October 19	#5 Clarkson*	#7	Mercyhurst Ice Center • Erie, PA	Amanda Makela	L 0–3	5–1–1
October 20	#5 Clarkson*	#7	Mercyhurst Ice Center • Erie, PA	Stephanie Ciampa	W 4–3	6–1–1
October 26	#10 Minnesota State*	#5	Mercyhurst Ice Center • Erie, PA	Amanda Makela	W 8–1	7–1–1
October 26	#10 Minnesota State*	#5	Mercyhurst Ice Center • Erie, PA	Stephanie Ciampa	W 3–1	8–1–1
November 2	at Lindenwood	#5	Lindenwood Ice Arena • Wentzville, MO	Stephanie Ciampa	W 6–1	9–1–1 (3–0–0)
November 3	at Lindenwood	#5	Lindenwood Ice Arena • Wentzville, MO	Stephanie Ciampa	W 6–0	10–1–1 (4–0–0)
November 16	at Yale*	#4	Ingalls Rink • New Haven, CT	Amanda Makela	W 4–0	11–1–1
November 17	at Yale*	#4	Ingalls Rink • New Haven, CT	Stephanie Ciampa	W 4–0	12–1–1
November 30	Penn State	#4	Mercyhurst Ice Center • Erie, PA	Amanda Makela	W 5–0	13–1–1 (5–0–0)
December 1	Penn State	#4	Mercyhurst Ice Center • Erie, PA	Stephanie Ciampa	W 7–1	14–1–1 (6–0–0)
December 7	at Robert Morris	#4	Colonials Arena • Neville Township, PA	Amanda Makela	L 1–3	14–2–1 (6–1–0)
December 8	at Robert Morris	#4	Colonials Arena • Neville Township, PA	Stephanie Ciampa	L 1–2	14–3–1 (6–2–0)
January 11, 2013	Syracuse	#7	Mercyhurst Ice Center • Erie, PA	Amanda Makela	W 1–0	15–3–1 (7–2–0)
January 12	Syracuse	#7	Mercyhurst Ice Center • Erie, PA	Amanda Makela	W 4–1	16–3–1 (8–2–0)
January 18	#2 Boston College*	#7	Mercyhurst Ice Center • Erie, PA	Amanda Makela	L 1–5	16–4–1
January 19	#2 Boston College*	#7	Mercyhurst Ice Center • Erie, PA	Stephanie Ciampa	W 3–2	17–4–1
January 25	vs. Lindenwood	#6	Jamestown Savings Bank Ice Arena • Jamestown, NY	Amanda Makela	W 10–0	18–4–1 (9–2–0)
January 26	Lindenwood	#6	Erie Insurance Arena • Erie, PA	Stephanie Ciampa	W 5–1	19–4–1 (10–2–0)
January 29	at #5 Cornell*	#7	Lynah Rink • Ithaca, NY	Amanda Makela	L 0–4	19–5–1
February 1	at Penn State	#7	Penn State Ice Pavilion • University Park, PA	Stephanie Ciampa	W 5–2	20–5–1 (11–2–0)
February 2	at Penn State	#7	Penn State Ice Pavilion • University Park, PA	Amanda Makela	W 5–2	21–5–1 (12–2–0)
February 8	Robert Morris	#7	Mercyhurst Ice Center • Erie, PA	Amanda Makela	L 2–4	21–6–1 (12–3–0)
February 9	Robert Morris	#7	Mercyhurst Ice Center • Erie, PA	Stephanie Ciampa	W 9–1	22–6–1 (13–3–0)
February 15	at Syracuse	#9	Tennity Ice Skating Pavilion • Syracuse, NY	Stephanie Ciampa	W 5–3	23–6–1 (14–3–0)
February 16	at Syracuse	#9	Tennity Ice Skating Pavilion • Syracuse, NY	Stephanie Ciampa	W 3–2	24–6–1 (15–3–0)
February 22	RIT	#9	Mercyhurst Ice Center • Erie, PA	Stephanie Ciampa	W 4–1	25–6–1 (16–3–0)
February 23	RIT	#9	Mercyhurst Ice Center • Erie, PA	Stephanie Ciampa	W 5–2	26–6–1 (17–3–0)
CHA Tournament
March 8	Robert Morris*	#9	Mercyhurst Ice Center • Erie, PA (CHA Semifinal Game)	Stephanie Ciampa	W 2–1	27–6–1
March 9	Syracuse*	#9	Mercyhurst Ice Center • Erie, PA (CHA Championship)	Stephanie Ciampa	W 4–1	28–6–1
NCAA Tournament
March 16	at #2 Cornell*	#8	Lynah Rink • Ithaca, NY (NCAA Quarterfinal)	Stephanie Ciampa	W 4–3 ^{OT}	29–6–1
March 24	vs. #2 Boston University*	#5	Ridder Arena • Minneapolis (Frozen Four- Semifinal Game)	Stephanie Ciampa	L 1–4	29–7–1
*Non-conference game. ^{#}Rankings from USCHO.com Poll.

== Awards and honors ==
Junior Forward Christine Bestland was unanimously chosen as the CHA Conference Player of the Year. Stephanie Ciampa was named CHA Goaltender of the Year. Bestland, Forward Shelby Bram and Defender Vaila Higson were named to the All-Conference First Team. Defender Molly Byrne was named to the Second Team. Forwards Emily Janiga and Jenna Dingeldein, as well as Defender Lauren Kilroy were named to the All-Rookie Team. Christine Bestland was named to the All-USCHO Third Team. The USCHO honors the best college players in the nation.
