= Kristen Richards =

Canadian ice hockey player

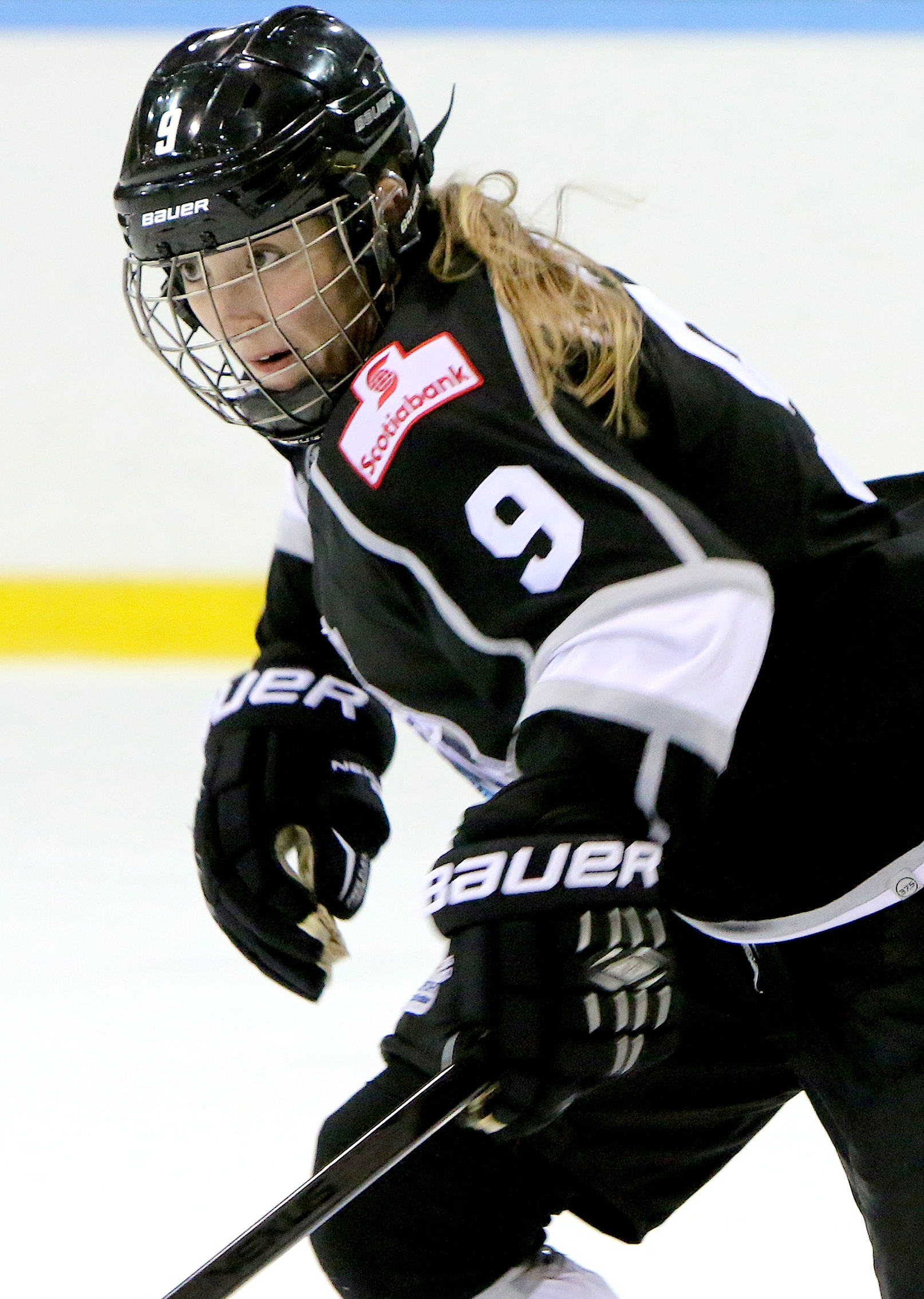
- Richards in action with the Brampton Thunder during the 2015–16 season
- Born: 4 July 1992 (age 33) Toronto, ON, CAN
- Height: 5 ft 9 in (175 cm)
- Position: Forward
- Shoots: Right
- Played for: Markham Thunder; Robert Morris University; Niagara University; Mississauga Jr. Chiefs
- National team: Canada
- Playing career: 2010–present

Kristen Richards (born July 4, 1992) is a Canadian professional ice hockey player. She is currently a member of the Professional Women's Hockey Players Association (PWHPA), following four seasons with the Markham Thunder (formerly the Brampton Thunder) of the Canadian Women's Hockey League (CWHL). Prior to that, she played NCAA Division I hockey for Niagara and Robert Morris.

== Playing career ==
=== PWHL ===
Richards skated for the Mississauga Jr. Chiefs of the Provincial Women's Hockey League (PWHL), serving as the team's captain in 2009–10, when she posted 47 points in 33 games. The Chiefs were one of the top programs in both the PWHL and the Ontario Women's Hockey Association (OWHA) with Richards on the team, winning the OWHA's gold medal to conclude the 2008–09 season. Additionally, Mississauga enjoyed top-three finishes in the league or association in 2007–08 (bronze medals for both the PWHL and OWHA) and 2009–10 (PWHL silver medal, OWHA bronze medal). Notably, Richards' Chiefs teams included future Thunder teammate Sarah Edney, future Robert Morris teammate Thea Imbrogno, and other future NCAA and professional players like Emily Pfalzer and Jenna Dingeldein.

In addition to the Chiefs, Richards also attended St. Basil-the-Great College School and enjoyed success with her school team, winning Ontario Federation of School Athletic Associations championships in 2008–09 and 2009–10, as well as four Toronto District College Athletic Association titles.

=== NCAA ===
==== Niagara ====
Richards signed with Niagara University to begin her collegiate career and made an immediate impact at NU, scoring seven times and adding seven assists as a freshman to tie for second on the team in scoring. Her first college goal (and point) came against Minnesota State on October 8, 2010, although her third goal one month later was among her biggest: Richards' overtime power play goal with 1:59 remaining toppled Mercyhurst at Dwyer Arena. The Lakers were ranked fourth in NCAA Division I at the time and were coming off of an appearance in the 2010 Frozen Four. Six days later, on November 12, 2010, Richards scored with 3:56 remaining to defeat Colgate, while her first multi-point game involved a pair of assists in a 2–1 victory over Wayne State on January 15, 2011.

On a team level, the Purple Eagles' 2010–11 season got off to a slow start, as NU was just 3–12–3 in early December. Things turned around a little from there, as subsequent unbeaten streaks of six games and four games helped Niagara finish second in the College Hockey America (CHA) standings with an 8–6–0 league record. However, third-seeded Syracuse abruptly ended the Purple Eagles' season in the CHA semifinals. Richards, for her part, was selected to the CHA's all-rookie team in recognition of her strong freshman season.

For the 2011–12 season, Niagara changed coaches, with assistant Josh Sciba promoted to replace the departed Chris MacKenzie. Meanwhile, Richards had quickly become considered a central part of the young team's offense, along with Jessica Hitchcock and Jenna Hendrikx. Although the Purple Eagles started the year 0–4–0, things abruptly turned around on October 14, 2011 against RPI, when Richards scored twice - the second coming on a penalty shot in overtime after she was hooked on a breakaway - to help NU to its first win of the year and the first win of Sciba's head coaching career. The come-from-behind effort set off a hot streak, as Niagara went 7–2–5 over a 14-game span to climb to 7–6–5 overall after a tie with Ohio State on December 2, 2011. While that turned out to be the pinnacle of NU's campaign - the Purps finished the regular season 10–15–8 overall and a third-place-worthy 3–6–3 within the CHA - Richards continued to demonstrate an aptitude for big, dramatic goals. On January 21, 2012 at Syracuse, she banged home a 5-on-3 advantage tally late in overtime to beat the Orange by a 2–1 count. Two weeks later, at Mercyhurst, Niagara found itself facing third-period deficits of 2–1 and 3–2, but Richards answered each time, the latter with just 12 seconds remaining, to force a draw with the fifth-ranked Lakers.

In the 2012 CHA playoffs, Niagara again saw its run come to a quick end in the semifinals, this time to a Robert Morris team en route to its first-ever conference title. Richards qualified for the All-CHA Academic Team for the second season in a row.

Shortly after the conclusion of the 2011–12 season, Niagara announced that it would immediately discontinue its women's hockey program, forcing Richards and other members of the team to either transfer or continue studying at NU without playing hockey.

==== Robert Morris ====
For Richards, along with defenseman Kelsey Gunn, the solution to the Niagara situation was a move south to newly crowned CHA champion Robert Morris, a transfer that paid nearly-immediate dividends. In her first official NCAA game as a Colonial (following a handful of exhibition contests), Richards scored the game-winning goal in a 2–0 victory over Yale. Not only that, but in a sort of a full-circle moment, it was assisted off of a turnover by Imbrogno, Richards' old teammate from St. Basil's and the Mississauga Jr. Chiefs.

Despite playing 10 of its first 12 games on the road, RMU got off to a 9–3–2 start in 2012–13, following a sweep of Mercyhurst upon returning home. Along the way, Richards showed that she didn't leave her knack for late-game heroics at Niagara, as she deflected home a third-period goal to force overtime at Vermont on November 4, 2012, then fed Anneline Lauziere for the winner. RMU slumped badly after New Year's however, going just 2–11–1 in 2013 before a regular-season-ending sweep of NCAA newcomer Penn State salvaged a 13–14–3 overall record and a fourth-place finish in a tight CHA race. Richards' late season was highlighted by her hand in both Robert Morris goals (along with a third-period checking from behind major and game misconduct) in a tie with RIT on January 26, 2013 as well as two other multi-point efforts.

The Colonials opened the 2013 CHA playoffs with a first-round series sweep over fifth-seeded Lindenwood, but fell to Mercyhurst in the conference semifinals to close the year.

After the unsuccessful CHA title defense, expectations were somewhat tempered for RMU in Richards' senior year, 2013–14, as the conference coaches tabbed the Colonials third in the preseason poll, although Richards - now the team's captain - was again expected to play a key role. Both team and individual rose to the challenge however, with Robert Morris' 24–8–3 final overall mark standing as the best in program history to that point (the 24 wins remain tied for the team record as of the end of 2016–17) and Richards depositing a career-best 26 points in those 35 games. RMU's 13–5–2 CHA record narrowly missed the school's first league regular-season title, as the Colonials were second to archrival Mercyhurst by four points.

Richards' season was highlighted by her being named the CHA's Offensive Player of the Week on November 4, 2013, following a weekend sweep at Penn State, where she scored twice on 11 shots (of RMU's 49 total) in the second game of the series. She handed out three assists (a career-best for points) in a 6–4 win over Vermont on October 26, 2013, with that game and the Penn State games capping a career-best seven-game point streak. She would later add a five-game streak from November 26, 2013 against Ohio State through January 4, 2014 versus St. Lawrence. Against Syracuse on February 7, 2014, Richards and Imbrogno both assisted on a Brittany Howard goal that gave Imbrogno Robert Morris' career assist record.

In a bit of a parallel to the end of her time at Niagara, Richards' RMU and college career came to a close in the CHA semifinals at the hands of a team en route to a surprising championship run, in this case an RIT squad that was 16–15–3 overall during the regular season.

As of the end of the 2016–17 season, Richards' name remains a prominent part of the Colonials' record books, despite only playing two seasons at the school. Among other listings, she is sixth in team history in points per game (0.73), fourth in plus-minus rating (plus-17) and her 15 shots against Lindenwood on March 1, 2013 are an RMU single-game high.

=== CWHL ===
Richards entered the CWHL in 2015, when she was selected by the then-Brampton Thunder in the that year's CWHL Draft with the 16th overall pick, first in the fourth round (notably, former RMU teammate Rebecca Vint had also been selected by the Thunder with their previous selection, 11th overall, while former Mississauga Jr. Chiefs teammate Edney, who went on to play collegiate hockey at Harvard was drafted first overall by Brampton).

The 2015–16 season saw a resurgence for the Thunder, one of professional women's hockey's most storied franchises, but also one that had fallen on hard times with a 6–16–2 record in 2014–15 and a last-place league finish. Richards' new squad would rebound to 16–7–1, good for third place in the league standings and a playoff semifinal series with the second-seeded Calgary Inferno, although the Inferno swept the best-of-three round on the way to the 2016 Clarkson Cup.

Richards scored her first professional goal on November 21, 2015 in a rout of the Boston Blades, while adding a shorthanded assist on the way to a 13-point season, good for eighth best on the Thunder. She also rapidly gained a reputation as one of the CWHL's most dangerous penalty killers. Brampton led the league with seven shorthanded goals (and was second with an 83.19 percent penalty kill rate), while Richards' three shorthanded points were tied for the best league-wide (with Caroline Ouellette, Marie-Philip Poulin and Cathy Chartrand). She also offered eight points over four consecutive January 2016 games including, arguably, the Thunder's biggest results of the year, a sweep of the Inferno via overtime and shootout wins at Brampton Memorial Arena on the 9th and 10th. Richards scored in the first game while setting up Candice Styles' OT winner, then had three assists the next day in a wild 8–7 shootout victory that saw Brampton rally from numerous large deficits, including 5–1 early in the second period and 7–5 midway through the third.

In 2016–17, the Thunder slid slightly backwards to 12–10–2, but were a carbon copy of their 2015–16 version in many other ways: the team finished third in the league standings, and was defeated in a playoff semifinal sweep to the eventual Clarkson Cup champion, this time Les Canadiennes de Montreal. Richards played in her 50th professional game (including playoff contests) in the regular-season finale, a shootout win over Boston on February 19, 2017.

=== Ball hockey ===
Richards was an accomplished ball hockey player, in addition to her ice hockey exploits, at St. Basil-the-Great College. St. Basil's won the Ontario Ball Hockey Association's provincial championships in 2007, 2008 and again in 2010, with Richards earning a spot on the tournament all-star team during the 2010 run.

In 2015, along with future Thunder teammates Vint and Jamie Lee Rattray, Richards competed at the Canadian Ball Hockey Association national championships and helped the Toronto Shamrocks to the title. She collected an assist in the final, a 2–1 overtime win over Newfoundland United. Richards has credited her experience at the CBHA tournament for helping her transition to CWHL play, after taking 2014–15 off following her graduation from Robert Morris.

== Personal and coaching ==
Richards holds an English degree from Robert Morris University and is a certified English, special education, and ESL teacher. She is a member of the staff at De La Salle College, a private school in Toronto, Ontario. She has also served as the head development coach of the Etobicoke Dolphins Girls Hockey Association, specializing in power skating.

== Career statistics ==
=== College and professional ===
			Regular season								Playoffs
Season	Team	League	GP	G	A	Pts	PIM	PPG	SHG	GWG	GP	G	A	Pts	PIM	PPG	SHG	GWG
2010–11	Niagara	NCAA	33	7	7	14	63	3	0	2	—	—	—	—	—	—	—	—
2011–12	Niagara	NCAA	33	6	5	11	46	1	0	2	—	—	—	—	—	—	—	—
2012–13	Robert Morris	NCAA	32	9	14	23	45	2	0	1	—	—	—	—	—	—	—	—
2013–14	Robert Morris	NCAA	35	7	19	26	54	0	0	1	—	—	—	—	—	—	—	—
2015–16	Brampton Thunder	CWHL	24	2	11	13	18	0	0	1	2	0	1	1	4	0	0	0
2016–17	Brampton Thunder	CWHL	24	1	2	3	18	1	0	0	2	0	1	1	4	0	0	0
2017–18	Markham Thunder	CWHL	—	—	—	—	—	—	—	—	—	—	—	—	—	—	—	—
NCAA totals			133	29	45	74	208	6	0	6	—	—	—	—	—	—	—	—
CWHL totals			48	3	13	16	36	1	0	1	4	0	2	2	8	0	0	0

== Awards and honours ==
- 2010–11 CHA All-Rookie Team
- 2010–11 CHA All-Academic Team
- 2011–12 CHA All-Academic Team
- 2012–13 CHA All-Academic Team
- 2013–14 CHA All-Academic Team
- CHA Offensive Player of the Week (November 4, 2013)
