= 2012–13 CHA women's ice hockey season =

2012–13 College Hockey America women's ice hockey season
- League: NCAA Division I
- Sport: Ice hockey
- Duration: September 2012 - March, 2013
- Teams: 6

Regular season

Ice hockey seasons
- ← 11–12 13–14 →

The 2012–13 WCHA women's ice hockey season marked the continuation of the annual tradition of competitive ice hockey among Western Collegiate Hockey Association members.

== Regular season ==
=== Standings ===
2012–13 College Hockey America standings
	Conference record							Overall record					
	GP	W	L	T	PTS	GF	GA	GP	W	L	T	GF	GA
#5 Mercyhurst^{†*}	20	17	3	0	34	96	27	37	29	7	1	153	65
Syracuse	20	13	6	1	27	54	32	36	20	15	1	97	74
RIT	20	7	8	5	19	41	45	37	16	16	5	96	79
Robert Morris	20	9	10	1	19	52	50	33	15	15	3	81	77
Lindenwood	20	7	10	3	17	41	71	36	7	26	3	61	151
Penn State	20	1	17	2	4	22	81	35	7	26	2	69	109
Champion: Mercyhurst † indicates conference regular season champion; * indicates conference tournament champion Final rankings: USCHO.com Poll

=== In-season honors ===
==== Players of the week ====
Week	Player of the week
October 4	
October 11	
October 18	
October 25	
November 2	
November 9	
November 16	

==== Defensive players of the week ====
Week	Player of the week
October 4	
October 11	
October 18	
October 25	
November 2	
November 9	
November 16	

==== Rookies of the week ====
Week	Rookie of the week
October 4	
October 11	
October 18	
October 25	
November 2	
November 9	
November 16	

== See also ==
- National Collegiate Women's Ice Hockey Championship
