= 2012–13 Hockey East women's ice hockey season =

American college ice hockey season

The 2012–13 Hockey East women's ice hockey season marked the continuation of the annual tradition of competitive ice hockey among Hockey East members.

== Regular season ==
=== Standings ===
2012–13 Hockey East Association standings
	Conference							Overall					
	GP	W	L	T	PTS	GF	GA	GP	W	L	T	GF	GA
Boston University	21	18	2	1	37			37	28	6	3		
Boston College	21	17	2	2	36			37	27	7	3		
Northeastern	21	13	7	1	27			36	23	11	2		
New Hampshire	21	10	8	3	23			34	14	16	4		
Providence	21	8	10	3	19			36	15	16	5		
Vermont	21	6	11	4	16			33	8	21	4		
Maine	21	2	16	3	7			33	5	24	4		
Connecticut	21	1	19	1	3			35	3	29	3		
Championship: To Be Determined † indicates conference regular season champion * indicates conference tournament champion National rankings: Conference rankings: Updated February 2, 2013

*Rankings based on number of points in the conference

=== In-season honors ===
==== Players of the week ====
Week	Player of the week
October 11	Kendall Coyne, Northeastern
October 18	Kendall Coyne, Northeastern
October 25	Klara Myren, Vermont; Marie-Philip Poulin, Boston University
November 2	
November 9	
November 16	

==== Defensive players of the week ====
Week	Player of the week
October 11	Chloe Desjardins, Northeastern; Vilma Vaattovaara (New Hampshire)
October 18	Chloe Desjardins, Northeastern
October 25	Kerrin Sperry, Boston University
November 2	
November 9	
November 16	

==== Rookies of the week ====
Week	Rookie of the week
October 11	Sarah Lefort, Boston University
October 18	Sarah Lefort, Boston University
October 25	Alexis Crossley, New Hampshire
November 2	
November 9	
November 16	

== See also ==
- National Collegiate Women's Ice Hockey Championship
- 2012–13 CHA women's ice hockey season
- 2012–13 ECAC women's ice hockey season
- 2012–13 WCHA women's ice hockey season
