= 2012–13 Robert Morris Colonials women's ice hockey season =

- Conference: 4th College Hockey America
- Home ice: 84 Lumber Arena

Record
- Overall: 15–15–3
- Conference: 9–10–1
- Home: 8–8–0
- Road: 7–7–3

Coaches and captains
- Head coach: Paul Colontino (2nd season)
- Assistant coaches: Logan Bittle; Brianne McLaughlin
- Captain: Dayna Newsom
- Alternate captain(s): Cobina Delaney; Thea Imbrogno; Jamie Joslin

The Robert Morris Colonials women represented Robert Morris University in CHA women's ice hockey, during the 2012–13 NCAA Division I women's ice hockey season. The Colonials finished conference play in fourth place. They made it to the semifinal game of the CHA Tournament, where they were narrowly defeated by Mercyhurst.

== Offseason ==
- April 3: Former Goaltender Brianne McLaughlin was named to the US National Team for the IIHF, World Championship series.

=== Recruiting ===
Player	Nationality	Position	Notes
Leah Carlson	United States	Defense	hails from Copper Center, Alaska
Megan Eady	Canada	Defense	Played for the Nepean Wildcats
Anissa Gamble	Canada	Forward	Member of Burlington Barracudas
Ashley Vesci	United States	Forward	Attended Lawrence Academy

=== Transfers ===
Player	Position	Class	Former team
Kesley Gunn	Defense	Sophomore	Niagara Purple Eagles
Kristen Richards	Forwards	Junior	Niagara Purple Eagles

== Standings ==
2012–13 College Hockey America standings
	Conference record							Overall record					
	GP	W	L	T	PTS	GF	GA	GP	W	L	T	GF	GA
#5 Mercyhurst^{†*}	20	17	3	0	34	96	27	37	29	7	1	153	65
Syracuse	20	13	6	1	27	54	32	36	20	15	1	97	74
RIT	20	7	8	5	19	41	45	37	16	16	5	96	79
Robert Morris	20	9	10	1	19	52	50	33	15	15	3	81	77
Lindenwood	20	7	10	3	17	41	71	36	7	26	3	61	151
Penn State	20	1	17	2	4	22	81	35	7	26	2	69	109
Champion: Mercyhurst † indicates conference regular season champion; * indicates conference tournament champion Final rankings: USCHO.com Poll

== Roster ==
=== 2012–13 Colonials ===
No.	Nat.	Player	Class	Pos	Height	DoB	Hometown	Previous team
1		Delayne Brian	Senior	G	5' 9" (1.75 m)		Winnipeg, Manitoba	Wayne State University
2		Leah Carlson	Freshman	D	5' 8" (1.73 m)		Copper Center, Alaska	Kenny Lake
3		Dayna Newsom (C)	Senior	F	5' 7" (1.7 m)		Oakville, Ontario	Oakville Ice
4		Katelyn Scott	Sophomore	F	5' 6" (1.68 m)		Brighton, Michigan	Belle Tire
5		Anneline Lauziere	Junior	D	5' 6" (1.68 m)		St. Thomas, Ontario	London Jr. Devilettes
6		Kelsey Gunn	Sophomore	D	5' 9" (1.75 m)		Smith Falls, Ontario	Niagara University
8		Megan Eady	Freshman	D	5' 6" (1.68 m)		Renfrew, Ontario	Nepean Jr. Wildcats
9		Kylie St. Louis	Junior	D	5' 11" (1.8 m)		Windsor, Ontario	Southwest Wildcats
11		Kristin Richards	Junior	F	5' 9" (1.75 m)		Toronto, Ontario	Niagara University
14		Jennifer Kindret	Senior	F	5' 9" (1.75 m)		Winnipeg, Manitoba	BC Breakers
16		Erin Staniewski	Sophomore	D	5' 7" (1.7 m)		Strathroy, Ontario	London Jr. Devilettes
17		Kelsey Thomas	Senior	F	5' 5" (1.65 m)		Hamilton, Ontario	Hamilton Hawks
18		Anissa Gamble	Freshman	F	5' 5" (1.65 m)		Fredericton, New Brunswick	Burlington Jr. Barracudas
19		Thea Imbrogno (A)	Junior	F	5' 4" (1.63 m)		Etobicoke, Ontario	Mississauga Jr, Chiefs
20		Courtney Langston	Senior	F	5' 4" (1.63 m)		Warrensburg, Missouri	Shattuck St. Mary's
21		Maddie Collias	Sophomore	F	5' 7" (1.7 m)		Roseville, Michigan	Belle Tire
22		Ashley Vesci	Freshman	F	5' 5" (1.65 m)		Pittsburgh, Pennsylvania	Lawrence Academy
24		Rebecca Vint	Sophomore	F	5' 10" (1.78 m)		Caledon, Ontario	Brampton Jr. Thunder
25		Jamie Joslin (A)	Senior	D	5' 8" (1.73 m)		Richmond Hill, Ontario	Aurora Panthers
26		Cobina Delaney (A)	Senior	F	5' 7" (1.7 m)		Stittsville, Ontario	Ottawa Lady Senators
27		Katie Fergus	Sophomore	F	5' 9" (1.75 m)		Oakville, Ontario	Burlington Jr. Barracudas
28		Brandi Pollock	Junior	D	5' 6" (1.68 m)		Virden, Manitoba	Westman Wildcats
29		Kristen DiCiocco	Senior	G	5' 7" (1.7 m)		Niagara Falls, Ontario	Stoney Creek Jr. Sabres
31		Courtney Vinet	Sophomore	G	5' 4" (1.63 m)		Camrose, Alberta	Edge School

== Schedule ==
Date	Opponent^{#}	Rank^{#}	Site	Decision	Result	Record
Regular Season
October 19	Yale*		84 Lumber Arena • Neville Township, PA	Kristen DiCiocco	W 0–3	1–0–0
October 20	Princeton*		84 Lumber Arena • Neville Township, PA	Kristen DiCiocco	L 3–6	1–1–0
October 26	at #7 Northeastern*		Matthews Arena • Boston, MA	Kristen DiCiocco	T 3–3 ^{OT}	1–1–1
October 27	at #3 Boston University*		Walter Brown Arena • Boston, MA	Kristen DiCiocco	L 0–3	1–2–1
November 3	at Vermont*		Gutterson Fieldhouse • Burlington, VT	Kristen DiCiocco	W 6–2	2–2–1
November 4	at Vermont*		Gutterson Fieldhouse • Burlington, VT	Kristen DiCiocco	W 3–2 ^{OT}	3–2–1
November 10	at Penn State		Penn State Ice Pavilion • University Park, PA	Kristen DiCiocco	W 7–1	4–2–1 (1–0–0)
November 11	at Penn State		Penn State Ice Pavilion • University Park, PA	Delayne Brian	W 4–1	5–2–1 (2–0–0)
November 16	at Rensselaer*		Houston Field House • Troy, NY	Kristen DiCiocco	W 3–2	6–2–1
November 17	at Rensselaer*		Houston Field House • Troy, NY	Kristen DiCiocco	T 1–1 ^{OT}	6–2–2
November 30	at Syracuse		Tennity Ice Skating Pavilion • Syracuse, NY	Kristen DiCiocco	W 2–1	7–2–2 (3–0–0)
December 1	at Syracuse		Tennity Ice Skating Pavilion • Syracuse, NY	Kristen DiCiocco	L 3–4	7–3–2 (3–1–0)
December 7	#4 Mercyhurst		84 Lumber Arena • Neville Township, PA	Kristen DiCiocco	W 3–1	8–3–2 (4–1–0)
December 8	#4 Mercyhurst		84 Lumber Arena • Neville Township, PA	Kristen DiCiocco	W 2–1	9–3–2 (5–1–0)
January 4, 2012	RIT		84 Lumber Arena • Neville Township, PA	Kristen DiCiocco	L 1–2	9–4–2 (5–2–0)
January 5	RIT		84 Lumber Arena • Neville Township, PA	Kristen DiCiocco	L 1–2	9–5–2 (5–3–0)
January 11	Lindenwood		84 Lumber Arena • Neville Township, PA	Kristen DiCiocco	L 2–5	9–6–2 (5–4–0)
January 12	Lindenwood		84 Lumber Arena • Neville Township, PA	Delayne Brian	W 5–2	10–6–2 (6–4–0)
January 18	Quinnipiac*		84 Lumber Arena • Neville Township, PA	Kristen DiCiocco	L 1–2	10–7–2
January 19	Quinnipiac*		84 Lumber Arena • Neville Township, PA	Kristen DiCiocco	L 2–3	10–8–2
January 26	at RIT		Frank Ritter Memorial Ice Arena • Rochester, NY	Kristen DiCiocco	T 2–2 ^{OT}	10–8–3 (6–4–1)
January 27	at RIT		Frank Ritter Memorial Ice Arena • Rochester, NY	Kristen DiCiocco	L 0–2	10–9–3 (6–5–1)
February 1	Syracuse		84 Lumber Arena • Neville Township, PA	Kristen DiCiocco	L 2–3	10–10–3 (6–6–1)
February 2	Syracuse		84 Lumber Arena • Neville Township, PA	Delayne Brian	L 1–2	10–11–3 (6–7–1)
February 8	at Mercyhurst		Mercyhurst Ice Center • Erie, PA	Kristen DiCiocco	W 4–2	11–11–3 (7–7–1)
February 9	at Mercyhurst		Mercyhurst Ice Center • Erie, PA	Kristen DiCiocco	L 1–9	11–12–3 (7–8–1)
February 15	at Lindenwood		Lindenwood Ice Arena • Wentzville, MO	Kristen DiCiocco	L 2–3 ^{OT}	11–13–3 (7–9–1)
February 16	at Lindenwood		Lindenwood Ice Arena • Wentzville, MO	Delayne Brian	L 2–4	11–14–3 (7–10–1)
February 22	Penn State		84 Lumber Arena • Neville Township, PA	Kristen DiCiocco	W 4–1	12–14–3 (8–10–1)
February 23	Penn State		84 Lumber Arena • Neville Township, PA	Kristen DiCiocco	W 4–2	13–14–3 (9–10–1)
CHA Tournament
March 1	Lindenwood*		84 Lumber Arena • Neville Township, PA (Quarterfinal Game 1)	Kristen DiCiocco	W 2–1 ^{3OT}	14–14–3
March 2	Lindenwood*		84 Lumber Arena • Neville Township, PA (Quarterfinal Game 1)	Kristen DiCiocco	W 2–0	15–14–3
March 8	at #9 Mercyhurst*		Mercyhurst Ice Center • Erie, PA (Semifinal Game)	Kristen DiCiocco	L 1–2	15–15–3
*Non-conference game. ^{#}Rankings from USCHO.com Poll.

== Awards and honors ==
Sophomore Forward Rebecca Vint was named to the CHA All-Conference First Team.

Senior Defender Jamie Joslin was named to the CHA All-Conference Second Team Team.

RMU won the Team Best Sportsmen Award.
