= 2012–13 Syracuse Orange women's ice hockey season =

- Conference: 2nd College Hockey America
- Home ice: Tennity Ice Skating Pavilion

Record
- Overall: 20-15-1
- Conference: 13-6-1
- Home: 10-8-0
- Road: 9-6-1
- Neutral: 1-1-0

Coaches and captains
- Head coach: Paul Flanagan 5th season
- Assistant coaches: Alison Domenico; Brendon Knight
- Captain(s): Holly Carrie-Mattimoe; Jacquie Greco; Margot Scharfe

The Syracuse Orange women represented Syracuse University in CHA women's ice hockey during the 2012-13 NCAA Division I women's ice hockey season. It was the program's most successful season. The goaltending duo of Kallie Billadeau and Jenesica Drinkwater registered 8 shutouts between them.

== Offseason ==
- August 30: Alumnus Stefanie Marty was a member of the Bronze Medal winning Swiss National Team at the IIHF World Championship Series.

=== Recruiting ===
Player	Position	Nationality	Notes
Emily Auerbacher	Forward	United States	Potent Scorer with the JWHL Boston Shamrocks
Julie Bengis	Goaltender	United States	Kent School grad
Danielle Leslie	Forward	Canada	Named to Team Manitoba in 2011
Melissa Piacentini	Forward	United States	Played for U19 National Champion Assabet Valley
Nicole Renault	Defense	United States	Scored 40 points in 2011–12 with Little Caesar's

== Standings ==
2012–13 College Hockey America standings
	Conference record							Overall record					
	GP	W	L	T	PTS	GF	GA	GP	W	L	T	GF	GA
#5 Mercyhurst^{†*}	20	17	3	0	34	96	27	37	29	7	1	153	65
Syracuse	20	13	6	1	27	54	32	36	20	15	1	97	74
RIT	20	7	8	5	19	41	45	37	16	16	5	96	79
Robert Morris	20	9	10	1	19	52	50	33	15	15	3	81	77
Lindenwood	20	7	10	3	17	41	71	36	7	26	3	61	151
Penn State	20	1	17	2	4	22	81	35	7	26	2	69	109
Champion: Mercyhurst † indicates conference regular season champion; * indicates conference tournament champion Final rankings: USCHO.com Poll

== Roster ==
=== 2013–14 Orange ===
No.	Nat.	Player	Class	Pos	Height	DoB	Hometown	Previous team
1		Julie Bengis	Freshman	G	5' 7" (1.7 m)		Stormville, New York	Kent School
2		Nicole Renault	Freshman	D	5' 7" (1.7 m)		Plymouth, Michigan	Little Caesar's U19
3		Julie Knerr	Sophomore	F	5' 2" (1.57 m)		Dollard-des-Ormeaux, Quebec	John Abbot College
4		Akane Hosoyamada	Junior (RS)	D	5' 4" (1.63 m)		Banff, Alberta	Warner Hockey School
5		Sadie St. Germain	Junior	F	5' 6" (1.68 m)		Banff, Alberta	Warner Hockey School
6		Danielle Leslie	Freshman	D	5' 5" (1.65 m)		Winnipeg, Manitoba	Team Manitoba U18
7		Holly Carrie-Mattimoe (C)	Senior	F	5' 7" (1.7 m)		Sherwood Park, Alberta	Team Alberta U18
8		Brittney Krebs	Junior	F	5' 7" (1.7 m)		Marathon, New York	Team Manitoba U18
9		Allie Lacombe	Sophomore	F	5' 5" (1.65 m)		Eden Prairie, Minnesota	Eden Prairie HS
11		Cara Johnson	Junior	F	5' 8" (1.73 m)		Plymouth, Minnesota	Hopkins HS
12		Nicole Ferrera	Sophomore	F	5' 4" (1.63 m)		Winthrop, Massachusetts	Assabet Valley U19
14		Melissa Piacentini	Freshman	F	5' 2" (1.57 m)		South Weymouth, Massachusetts	Assabet Valley U19
15		Jacquie Greco (C)	Senior	F	5' 7" (1.7 m)		Buffalo, New York	Nichols School
16		Kaillie Goodnough	Sophomore	D	5' 4" (1.63 m)		Mannsville, New York	National Sports Academy
19		Margot Scharfe (C)	Junior	F	5' 7" (1.7 m)		Toronto, Ontario	Mississauga Jr. Chiefs
21		Marianne Thomaris	Freshman	F	5' 3" (1.6 m)		Elmira, New York	Millbrook School
22		Emily Auerbacher	Freshman	F	5' 5" (1.65 m)		Gladstone, New Jersey	Boston Shamrocks
27		Shiann Darkangelo	Sophomore	F	5' 9" (1.75 m)		Brighton, Michigan	Brighton HS
29		Jenesica Drinkwater	Junior	G	5' 7" (1.7 m)		Brantford, Ontario	Stoney Creek Jr. Sabres
32		Kallie Billadeau	Junior	G	5' 7" (1.7 m)		Minnetonka, Minnesota	Hopkins HS

== Schedule ==
Date	Opponent^{#}	Rank^{#}	Site	Decision	Result	Record
Regular Season
October 5	New Hampshire*		Tennity Ice Skating Pavilion • Syracuse, NY	Jenesica Drinkwater	L 3–4	0–1–0
October 6	#10 Northeastern*		Tennity Ice Skating Pavilion • Syracuse, NY	Jenesica Drinkwater	L 2–5	0–2–0
October 13	at Penn State		Penn State Ice Pavilion • University Park, PA	Jenesica Drinkwater	W 4–0	1–2–0 (1–0–0)
October 14	at Penn State		Penn State Ice Pavilion • University Park, PA	Kallie Billadeau	W 6–0	2–2–0 (2–0–0)
October 19	Quinnipiac*		Tennity Ice Skating Pavilion • Syracuse, NY	Jenesica Drinkwater	L 2–3 ^{OT}	2–3–0
October 20	Quinnipiac*		Tennity Ice Skating Pavilion • Syracuse, NY	Kallie Billadeau	W 4–0	3–3–0
October 26	at Connecticut*		Freitas Ice Forum • Storrs, CT	Kallie Billadeau	L 2–4	3–4–0
October 27	at Connecticut*		Freitas Ice Forum • Storrs, CT	Kallie Billadeau	W 2–0	4–4–0
November 2	at Union*		Achilles Center • Schenectady, NY	Kallie Billadeau	W 2–0	5–4–0
November 3	at Union*		Achilles Center • Schenectady, NY	Kallie Billadeau	L 2–4	5–5–0
November 10	at RIT		Frank Ritter Memorial Ice Arena • Rochester, NY	Jenesica Drinkwater	T 2–2 ^{OT}	5–5–1 (2–0–1)
November 20	RIT		Tennity Ice Skating Pavilion • Syracuse, NY	Kallie Billadeau	W 2–1 ^{OT}	6–5–1 (3–0–1)
November 23	Rensselaer*		Tennity Ice Skating Pavilion • Syracuse, NY	Kallie Billadeau	W 4–0	7–5–1
November 24	Rensselaer*		Tennity Ice Skating Pavilion • Syracuse, NY	Jenesica Drinkwater	W 4–0	8–5–1
November 30	Robert Morris		Tennity Ice Skating Pavilion • Syracuse, NY	Kallie Billadeau	L 1–2	8–6–1 (3–1–1)
December 1	Robert Morris		Tennity Ice Skating Pavilion • Syracuse, NY	Jenesica Drinkwater	W 4–3	9–6–1 (4–1–1)
December 7	at #2 Clarkson*		Cheel Arena • Potsdam, NY	Kallie Billadeau	L 2–3	9–7–1
December 8	#2 Clarkson*		Tennity Ice Skating Pavilion • Syracuse, NY	Jenesica Drinkwater	L 4–5	9–8–1
January 8, 2013	Colgate*		Tennity Ice Skating Pavilion • Syracuse, NY	Kallie Billadeau	W 6–0	10–8–1
January 11	at #7 Mercyhurst		Mercyhurst Ice Center • Erie, PA	Kallie Billadeau	L 0–1	10–9–1 (4–2–1)
January 12	at #7 Mercyhurst		Mercyhurst Ice Center • Erie, PA	Kallie Billadeau	L 1–4	10–10–1 (4–3–1)
January 15	at #4 Cornell*		Lynah Rink • Ithaca, NY	Jenesica Drinkwater	L 1–8	10–11–1
January 18	at Lindenwood		Lindenwood Ice Arena • Wentzville, MO	Kallie Billadeau	W 2–1	11–11–1 (5–3–1)
January 19	at Lindenwood		Lindenwood Ice Arena • Wentzville, MO	Kallie Billadeau	W 8–1	12–11–1 (6–3–1)
January 25	Penn State		Tennity Ice Skating Pavilion • Syracuse, NY	Kallie Billadeau	W 1–0	13–11–1 (7–3–1)
January 26	Penn State		Tennity Ice Skating Pavilion • Syracuse, NY	Jenesica Drinkwater	W 4–1	14–11–1 (8–3–1)
February 1	at Robert Morris		84 Lumber Arena • Neville Township, PA	Kallie Billadeau	W 3–2	15–11–1 (9–3–1)
February 2	at Robert Morris		84 Lumber Arena • Neville Township, PA	Kallie Billadeau	W 2–1	16–11–1 (10–3–1)
February 8	at RIT		Frank Ritter Memorial Ice Arena • Rochester, NY	Kallie Billadeau	W 2–1	17–11–1 (11–3–1)
February 9	RIT		Tennity Ice Skating Pavilion • Syracuse, NY	Kallie Billadeau	W 2–1	18–11–1 (12–3–1)
February 15	#9 Mercyhurst		Tennity Ice Skating Pavilion • Syracuse, NY	Kallie Billadeau	L 3-5	18–12–1 (12–4–1)
February 16	#9 Mercyhurst		Tennity Ice Skating Pavilion • Syracuse, NY	Kallie Billadeau	L 2-3	18–13–1 (12–5–1)
February 26	Lindenwood		Tennity Ice Skating Pavilion • Syracuse, NY	Jenesica Drinkwater	L 1-2 ^{OT}	18–14–1 (12–6–1)
February 27	Lindenwood		Tennity Ice Skating Pavilion • Syracuse, NY	Kallie Billadeau	W 4-1	19–14–1 (13–6–1)
CHA Tournament
March 8	vs. RIT*		Mercyhurst Ice Center • Erie, PA (Semifinal Game)	Kallie Billadeau	W 2-1 ^{OT}	20–14–1
March 9	at #9 Mercyhurst*		Mercyhurst Ice Center • Erie, PA (Championship Game)	Kallie Billadeau	L 1-4	20–15–1
*Non-conference game. ^{#}Rankings from USCHO.com Poll.

== Awards and honors ==
Head Coach Paul Flanagan was named the CHA Coach of the Year. Flanagan earned his 300th career win on February 27.

Junior Defense Akane Hosoyamada was named to the All-CHA First Team, along with Junior Goaltender Kallie Billadeau.

Sophomore forward Nicole Ferrera and junior forward Margot Scharfe were named to the Second Team.

Defender Nicole Renault was named to the All-Rookie Team.
