= 2012–13 RIT Tigers women's ice hockey season =

- Conference: 3rd CHA
- Home ice: Frank Ritter Memorial Ice Arena

Record
- Overall: 16–16–5
- Conference: 7–8–5
- Home: 8–5–3
- Road: 7–10–2
- Neutral: 1–1–0

Coaches and captains
- Head coach: Scott McDonald (7th season)
- Assistant coaches: Shivaun Siegl
- Captain: Kim Schlattman
- Alternate captain(s): Tenecia Hiller; Ariane Yokoyama

The RIT Tigers represented the Rochester Institute of Technology in College Hockey America during the 2012-13 NCAA Division I women's ice hockey season. This was the inaugural year at the Division I level. The Tigers had been the Division III National Champions in 2011-12, with a 28-1-1 record. In their move to Division I, and the College Hockey America conference, RIT had a modestly successful season, and reached the Semifinal level of the CHA Tournament.

2012–13 College Hockey America standings
	Conference record							Overall record					
	GP	W	L	T	PTS	GF	GA	GP	W	L	T	GF	GA
#5 Mercyhurst^{†*}	20	17	3	0	34	96	27	37	29	7	1	153	65
Syracuse	20	13	6	1	27	54	32	36	20	15	1	97	74
RIT	20	7	8	5	19	41	45	37	16	16	5	96	79
Robert Morris	20	9	10	1	19	52	50	33	15	15	3	81	77
Lindenwood	20	7	10	3	17	41	71	36	7	26	3	61	151
Penn State	20	1	17	2	4	22	81	35	7	26	2	69	109
Champion: Mercyhurst † indicates conference regular season champion; * indicates conference tournament champion Final rankings: USCHO.com Poll

== Recruiting ==
Player	Position	Nationality	Notes
Katie Hubert	Forward	Canada	Scoring threat from the Burlington Jr. Barracudas
Kristina Klishko	Defense	United States	Dual citizen member of Jr. Russian National Team
Casidhe Kunichika	Defense	United States	Sister of RIT star Kourtney Kunichika
Jess Paton	Forward	Canada	One of Two Recruits from the K-W Rangers
Carly Payerl	Forward/Defense	Canada	Paton's 3 year teammate of Jess Paton on K-W Rangers

== Roster ==
=== 2012–13 Tigers ===
No.	Nat.	Player	Class	Pos	Height	DoB	Hometown	Previous team
2		Danielle Read	Senior	D	5' 5" (1.65 m)		Brantford, Ontario	Hamilton Hawks
3		Morgan Scoyne (A)	Sophomore	D	5' 8" (1.73 m)		Drumbo, Ontario	Stoney Creek Sabres
4		Kristina Moss	Senior	D	5' 6" (1.68 m)		Webster, New York	Buffalo Bisons
6		Tenecia Hiller (A)	Senior	F	5' 6" (1.68 m)		Brampton, Ontario	Brampton Thunder
8		Ariane Yokoyama (A)	Senior	F	5' 3" (1.6 m)		Van Nuys, California	LA Selects
10		Kim Schlattman (C)	Senior	F	5' 4" (1.63 m)		Stratford, Ontario	Cambridge Fury
11		Ellesha Fortuna	Senior	D	5' 5" (1.65 m)		Burlington, Ontario	Burlington Barracudas
13		Casidhe Kunichika	Freshman	D	5' 3" (1.6 m)		Fullerton, California	LA Selects
15		Kolbee McRea	Junior	F	5' 9" (1.75 m)		Wawa, Ontario	Burlington Barracudas
17		Carly Payerl	Freshman	F	5' 9" (1.75 m)		Kitchener, Ontario	Waterloo K-W Rangers
18		Julie Hall	Sophomore	F	5' 7" (1.7 m)		Mississauga, Ontario	Mississauga Jr. Chiefs
19		Marissa Maugeri	Sophomore	F	5' 3" (1.6 m)		Ajax, Ontario	Durham West Jr. Lightning
20		Erin Zach	Junior	F	5' 3" (1.6 m)		Elmira, Ontario	Cambridge Fury
21		Emilee Bulleid	Sophomore	D	5' 5" (1.65 m)		Waterdown, Ontario	Stoney Creek Sabres
22		Katie Hubert	Freshman	F	5' 8" (1.73 m)		Burlington, Ontario	Burlington Jr. Barracudas
23		Lindsay Grigg	Sophomore	F/D	5' 6" (1.68 m)		Oakville, Ontario	Oakville Hornets
24		Celeste Brown	Sophomore	F	5' 6" (1.68 m)		Great Falls, Montana	National Sports Academy
26		Kourtney Kunichika	Junior	F	5' 5" (1.65 m)		Fullerton, California	LA Selects
27		Jess Paton	Freshman	F	5' 4" (1.63 m)		Woodstock, Ontario	Kitchener-Waterloo Rangers
28		Melissa Bromley	Junior	D	5' 11" (1.8 m)		Aurora, Ontario	Aurora Panthers
35		Laura Chamberlain	Junior	G	5' 3" (1.6 m)		Norco, California	LA Selects
39		Ali Binnington	Sophomore	G	5' 9" (1.75 m)		Oakville, Ontario	Mississauga Jr. Chiefs

== Schedule ==
Date	Opponent^{#}	Rank^{#}	Site	Decision	Result	Record
Regular Season
September 28	#10 Mercyhurst		Frank Ritter Memorial Ice Arena • Rochester, NY	Laura Chamberlain	L 2–6	0–1–0 (0–1–0)
September 29	#10 Mercyhurst		Frank Ritter Memorial Ice Arena • Rochester, NY	Ali Binnington	L 0–7	0–2–0 (0–2–0)
October 5	at Sacred Heart*		Wonderland of Ice • Bridgeport, CT	Ali Binnington	W 8–0	1–2–0
October 6	at Sacred Heart*		Wonderland of Ice • Bridgeport, CT	Laura Chamberlain	W 7–2	2–2–0
October 19	Princeton*		Frank Ritter Memorial Ice Arena • Rochester, NY	Laura Chamberlain	L 1–2	2–3–0
October 20	Yale*		Blue Cross Arena • Rochester, NY	Ali Binnington	W 3–0	3–3–0
October 25	at Penn State		Penn State Ice Pavilion • University Park, PA	Ali Binnington	W 4–1	4–3–0 (1–2–0)
October 26	at Penn State		Penn State Ice Pavilion • University Park, PA	Laura Chamberlain	T 2–2 ^{OT}	4–3–1 (1–2–1)
November 9	at Colgate*		Starr Rink • Hamilton, NY	Laura Chamberlain	L 1–2	4–4–1
November 10	Syracuse		Frank Ritter Memorial Ice Arena • Rochester, NY	Ali Binnington	T 2–2 ^{OT}	4–4–2 (1–2–2)
November 16	at Brown*		Meehan Auditorium • Providence, RI	Ali Binnington	W 2–0	5–4–2
November 17	at Brown*		Meehan Auditorium • Providence, RI	Laura Chamberlain	W 2–1	6–4–2
November 20	at Syracuse		Tennity Ice Skating Pavilion • Syracuse, NY	Ali Binnington	L 1–2 ^{OT}	6–5–2 (1–3–2)
November 30	at #8 North Dakota*		Ralph Engelstad Arena • Grand Forks, ND	Laura Chamberlain	L 2–3	6–6–2
December 1	at #8 North Dakota*		Ralph Engelstad Arena • Grand Forks, ND	Ali Binnington	L 2–8	6–7–2
December 8	at Ohio State*		OSU Ice Rink • Columbus, OH	Ali Binnington	L 1–3	6–8–2
December 9	at Ohio State*		OSU Ice Rink • Columbus, OH	Laura Chamberlain	L 2–6	6–9–2
December 15	Lindenwood		Frank Ritter Memorial Ice Arena • Rochester, NY	Ali Binnington	W 5–1	7–9–2 (2–3–2)
December 16	Lindenwood		Frank Ritter Memorial Ice Arena • Rochester, NY	Ali Binnington	T 1–1 ^{OT}	7–9–3 (2–3–3)
January 4, 2013	at Robert Morris		84 Lumber Arena • Neville Township, PA	Ali Binnington	W 2–1	8–9–3 (3–3–3)
January 5	at Robert Morris		84 Lumber Arena • Neville Township, PA	Ali Binnington	W 2–1	9–9–3 (4–3–3)
January 12	Colgate*		Frank Ritter Memorial Ice Arena • Rochester, NY	Ali Binnington	L 2–3 ^{OT}	9–10–3
January 18	Sacred Heart*		Frank Ritter Memorial Ice Arena • Rochester, NY	Laura Chamberlain	W 11–0	10–10–3
January 19	Sacred Heart*		Frank Ritter Memorial Ice Arena • Rochester, NY	Ali Binnington	W 6–0	11–10–3
January 26	Robert Morris		Frank Ritter Memorial Ice Arena • Rochester, NY	Ali Binnington	T 2–2 ^{OT}	11–10–4 (4–3–4)
January 27	Robert Morris		Frank Ritter Memorial Ice Arena • Rochester, NY	Ali Binnington	W 2–0	12–10–4 (5–3–4)
February 1	at Lindenwood		Lindenwood Ice Arena • Wentzville, MO	Ali Binnington	T 1–1 ^{OT}	12–10–5 (5–3–5)
February 1	at Lindenwood		Lindenwood Ice Arena • Wentzville, MO	Laura Chamberlain	L 3–4	12–11–5 (5–4–5)
February 8	Syracuse		Frank Ritter Memorial Ice Arena • Rochester, NY	Ali Binnington	L 1–2	12–12–5 (5–5–5)
February 9	at Syracuse		Tennity Ice Skating Pavilion • Syracuse, NY	Ali Binnington	L 1–2	12–13–5 (5–6–5)
February 15	Penn State		Frank Ritter Memorial Ice Arena • Rochester, NY	Laura Chamberlain	W 3–1	13–13–5 (6–6–5)
February 16	Penn State		Frank Ritter Memorial Ice Arena • Rochester, NY	Laura Chamberlain	W 4–0	14–13–5 (7–6–5)
February 22	at #7 Mercyhurst		Mercyhurst Ice Center • Erie, PA	Ali Binnington	L 1–4	14–14–5 (7–7–5)
February 23	at #7 Mercyhurst		Mercyhurst Ice Center • Erie, PA	Ali Binnington	L 2–5	14–15–5 (7–8–5)
CHA Tournament
March 1	Penn State*		Frank Ritter Memorial Ice Arena • Rochester, NY (Quarterfinal, Game 1)	Ali Binnington	W 1–0	15–15–5
March 2	Penn State*		Frank Ritter Memorial Ice Arena • Rochester, NY (Quarterfinal, Game 2)	Ali Binnington	W 3–2 ^{OT}	16–15–5
March 8	vs. Syracuse*		Mercyhurst Ice Center • Erie, PA (Semifinal Game)	Ali Binnington	L 1–2 ^{OT}	16–16–5
*Non-conference game. ^{#}Rankings from USCHO.com Poll.

== Awards and honors ==
Assistant captain Forward Tenicia Hiller was named to the All-CHA Second Team.
