= 2011–12 Lindenwood Lady Lions ice hockey season =

2011–12 Lindenwood Lions women's ice hockey season
- Conference: NCAA Division I independent schools (ice hockey)
- Home ice: LU Ice Arena

Rankings
- USA Today/USA Hockey Magazine: Not ranked
- USCHO.com/CBS College Sports: Not ranked

Record
- Overall: 8-21-0
- Home: 0-4-0
- Road: 8-15-0
- Neutral: 0–2–0

Coaches and captains
- Head coach: Vince O'Mara
- Assistant coaches: Katie Kells; Rick Pratt
- Captain: Brett Lobreau
- Alternate captain: Allysson Arcibal

The Lindenwood Lady Lions represent Lindenwood University. The 2011–12 Lindenwood Lady Lions ice hockey season was the team's 9th season and their 1st season as a member of the National Collegiate Athletic Association (NCAA). The team was coached by Vince O'Mara and they played their home games at Lindenwood Ice Arena. For the 2011–12 season, Lindenwood competed as an NCAA Division I independent program.

== Offseason ==
- July 2011: Lindenwood announced the 2011-12 schedule as the program's first season of NCAA competition as part of the university's transition from NAIA to NCAA. seven games against NCAA Division III; and five games against former ACHA Division I rivals Robert Morris (IL) and Grand Valley State
- September 14: Lindenwood officially submitted an application to join College Hockey America (CHA) for the 2012–2013 season.

=== Recruiting ===
- Lindenwood announced its first NCAA recruiting class on July 6, 2011. The 2011-12 recruiting class includes 12 incoming freshmen:

Player	Nationality	Position	Notes
Briar Bache	Canada	Goaltender	Bache played with the Aurora Panthers Intermediate A team and notched a 2.04 GAA and .930 save percentage.
Kendra Broad	Canada	Forward	She competed with the Southwest Wildcats in the Provincial Women's Hockey League.
Jordyn Constance	Canada	Forward	Constance competed with the Calgary Chaos of the Alberta Major Midget Female Hockey League (AMMFHL). She was named to the AMMFHL all-star team.
Megan Cox	United States	Defense	Cox was part of the Shattuck-St. Mary's U19 Girls National Championship.
Taylor Fairchild	United States	Goaltender	Fairchild competed with the Little Caesars U19 program and registered a 1.02 GAA and .945 save percentage.
Sydney Gorzitza	Canada	Defense	She played for the Medicine Hat Hounds of the Albert Major Midget Female Hockey League and scored two short-handed goals
Samantha Moore	United States	Forward	In her senior season for Lakeville South HS, she managed 20 goals and 35 assists to lead her club. In addition, she was an Honorable Mention All-State selection.
Caitlyn Post	United States	Forward	She is the second recruit to have played with the Little Caesars U19 program. In 15 league games, Post accumulated eight goals while registering four assists.
Mara Post	United States	Forward	Post played with Samantha Moore at Lakeville South HS. Her 37 points were third overall in team scoring.
Hanna-Riika Turpeinen	Finland	Defense	Last season, she played in her native Finland and guided Ilves to the 2011 European Club Championship while winning a silver medal at the World University Games.
Alyssa West	United States	Forward	West also competed for the Little Caesars U19 program. In fifteen games played, she registered 12 points
Alison Wickenheiser	United States	Forward	In 66 games for the Washington Pride U19 team, she scored 42 goals and 27 assists.

== Regular season ==
=== News and notes ===
- September 23: Lindenwood played its first official NCAA contest against #1 ranked and defending champions Wisconsin. Lindenwood held the Badgers to one goal in the first period before the Badgers added a goal early in the second then added six goals in the final half of the second period. Wisconsin outshot Lindenwood 60 to 11. Freshman goaltender, Taylor Fairchild made 49 saves for LU.
- September 30: The Lady Lions nearly earned its first NCAA Division I win versus the MSU-Mankato Mavericks. The Lady Lions fought back from a two-goal deficit with two third-period goals. A late goal by Kathleen Rogan gave Minnesota State a 4–3 lead, which they would not relinquish. At 5:24 in the second period. Less than a minute later, Kendra Broad scored the first goal in Lindenwood's NCAA history unassisted. Minnesota State outshot the Lady Lions 53–16, as Lady Lions goaltender Taylor Fairchild made 49 saves.
- October 27–28: The series versus the Mercyhurst Lakers program marked the first time that the Lindenwood Lady Lions hosted an NCAA Division I opponent in their home arena.
- November 4: The program picked up its first win as an NCAA program, 7–1, over Division III opponent, Saint Benedict.
- November 10: Lindenwood lost to Bemidji State 0–11 in the U.S. Hockey Hall of Fame Face-Off Classic, held in Eveleth, Minnesota.
- November 11: Lindenwood was admitted into College Hockey America on November 11, 2011, and will begin conference play starting in the 2012–13 season along with Penn State, bringing the CHA's membership to six members.
- November 12–13: Robert Morris (PA) sweeps Lindenwood in the programs second home series against a Division I team by the combined score of 2–12.
- December 3: The Lady Lions record their first overtime game against a Division I opponent when the team lost to Syracuse, 1–2 in the fourth minute of overtime on December 5, 2011. Freshman goaltender, Taylor Fairchild stopped 45 of 47 shots in the match.
- January 4, 2012: Lindenwood returned from winter break on January 4, 2012 and set a season high for most goals allowed in a 0–14 loss to sixth-ranked North Dakota. The Sioux outshot LU 62–15.
- January 7, 2012: Freshman forward, Alison Wickenheiser scored five goals to help LU to a 6–1 victory against Concordia (MN).
- January 14–21: Lindenwood set a season high win streak with four straight wins. The streak included Lindenwood's first win against an NCAA Division I opponent and first shutout of an NCAA Division I opponent with a 4–0 win over Sacred Heart on January 20. Junior forward, Sarah Oliphant scored the game-winning goal 82 seconds into the game while freshman goaltender, Taylor Fairchild made 25 saves to record her first collegiate shutout. Lindenwood held Sacred Heart scoreless on six power-play opportunities. Lindenwood earned its first series sweep of the season and first sweep in program history over an NCAA Division I opponent on January 21 with a 5–2 win against Sacred Heart. Freshman goaltender, Briar Bache recorded her second win of the season and first over a Division I opponent.
- January 28–30: Lindenwood played a three-game exhibition series against Robert Morris University- Chicago. The exhibition series paired the Lions up with the #3 ranked team in the ACHA Division I and former NAIA and ACHA rival of the Lady Lions. Although Robert Morris scored the first goal in the series opener, Lindenwood tied the game before the end of the first period with a goal by Kelsey Talbot. LU then scored two goals in the second and one goal in the third period to finish the game 4–1. Lindenwood outshot Robert Morris by a 58–19 margin in the opening game with freshman goaltender, Taylor Fairchild recording the exhibition win with 18 saves. In the second game of the series, sophomore forward, Allysson Arcibal recorded two goals with freshmen Alyssa West and Alison Wickenheiser each scoring a goal while sophomore goaltender, Briar Bache made 18 saves to win the second game of the exhibition series 4–1. Lindenwood outshot RMU(IL) by a 73–19 margin. The game also marked senior night for the 2011–12 season, in which Lindenwood celebrated senior night for the team's lone senior, defenseman Kendra Ganchar. In the final game of the series six different players recorded goals and freshmen goaltender, Taylor Fairchild made 13 saves to help LU to a 6–0 shutout of RMU.
- February 10–11: Lindenwood concluded its inaugural NCAA season on the road at Saint Michael's College. In the opening game Lindenwood jumped out to a 3–1 lead by the end of the first period. Saint Mike's outscored the Lady Lions 2–1 in both the second and third periods; taking the lead in the third period. Freshman forward, Jordyn Constance, scored with eight seconds remaining in regulation to tie the game 5-5, sending the game into overtime. In overtime, Alison Wickenheiser scored a power-play goal to give Lindenwood its first overtime win against an NCAA team and preserve the Lady Lions' winning streak. Wickenheiser's goal was her third of the game second hat trick in two games. In the final game of the season, Lindenwood scored four goals in the first period and three goals in the second to take a seven-goal lead into the final period. The Purple Knights broke the shutout early in the third period but Lindenwood answered held off a comeback attempt scoring two goals in the final period. The Lady Lions ended the game scoring a season-high nine goals and outshooting Saint Michael's 53–12 in the 9–1 win. Lindenwood finished the season on a season high six game win streak and won eight NCAA games overall. In addition Lindenwood swept its exhibition series against rival Robert Morris Illinois. Lindenwood's exhibition series against Grand Valley State scheduled for February 17 and 18 was cancelled.

=== Lindenwood Statistics Nationally ===
- Lindenwood University Statistics

Name	Stat	Ranking Nationally
Scoring Offense	2.66 G/GM (77G)	#20
Scoring Defense	6.28 G/GM (182GA)	#35
Scoring Margin	-105	na
Penalty Minutes	14.07 PIM/GM (408 PIM)	#2
Power Play	15%	#20
Penalty Kill	65.60%	#35
Shorthanded Goals	9 G	#1
Winning Percentage	8-21-0 38.10%	na
Unbeaten Streak	6 GM, Jan 14-Feb 11, 2012	na

=== Rankings ===
- Lindenwood University Rankings

Poll	Affiliation	Rank
USCHO.com Coaches Poll	National	#
USA Today Poll	National	#
INCH Power Rankings	National	#
NCAA Pairwise Rank	Post-Season	#
USCHO KRACH Rank	Post-Season	#
NCAA Ratings Percentage Index	Post-Season	#

=== Schedule ===
Date	Visitor	Score	Home	Location	Decision	Attendance	Overall	Exhibition	Box score
9/23/2011	Lindenwood	0-11	#1 Wisconsin	Kohl Center	Fairchild	1,417	0-1-0	0-0-0	
9/25/2011	Lindenwood	0-13	#1 Wisconsin	Kohl Center	Fairchild	544	0-2-0	0-0-0	
9/30/2011	Lindenwood	3-4	Minnesota State Mankato	All Seasons Arena	Fairchild	212	0-3-0	0-0-0	
10/1/2011	Lindenwood	2-10	Minnesota State Mankato	All Seasons Arena	Fairchild	106	0-4-0	0-0-0	
10/7/2011	Lindenwood	0-8	Robert Morris (PA)	Island Sports Center	Fairchild	132	0-5-0	0-0-0	
10/8/2011	Lindenwood	2-7	Robert Morris (PA)	Island Sports Center	Fairchild	134	0-6-0	0-0-0	
10/14/2011	Lindenwood	2-7	Colgate	Starr Arena	Fairchild	72	0-7-0	0-0-0	
10/15/2011	Lindenwood	2-8	Colgate	Starr Arena	Fairchild	202	0-8-0	0-0-0	
10/28/2011	#6 Mercyhurst	0-7	Lindenwood	Lindenwood Ice Arena	Fairchild	250	0-9-0	0-0-0	
10/29/2011	#6 Mercyhurst	1-14	Lindenwood	Lindenwood Ice Arena	Fairchild	100	0-10-0	0-0-0	
11/4/2011	Lindenwood	7-1	Saint Benedict	St. Cloud Athletic Complex	Fairchild	100	1-10-0	0-0-0	
11/5/2011	Lindenwood	6-7	St. Catherine	St. Cloud Athletic Complex	Fairchild	100	1-11-0	0-0-0	
11/10/2011	Lindenwood	0-11	#7 Bemidji State	Eveleth Hippodrome	Fairchild	400	1-12-0	0-0-0	
11/12/2011	Robert Morris (PA)	2-6	Lindenwood	Lindenwood Ice Arena	Fairchild	150	1-13-0	0-0-0	
11/13/2011	Robert Morris (PA)	0-6	Lindenwood	Lindenwood Ice Arena	Bache	125	1-14-0	0-0-0	
12/2/2011	Lindenwood	2-6	Syracuse	Tennity Ice Pavilion	Fairchild	123	1-15-0	0-0-0	
12/3/2011	Lindenwood	1-2 OT	Syracuse	Tennity Ice Pavilion	Fairchild	212	1-16-0	0-0-0	
12/14/2011	Lindenwood	0-9	#5 Mercyhurst	Mercyhurst Ice Center	Fairchild	444	1-17-0	0-0-0	
12/15/2011	Lindenwood	2-7	#5 Mercyhurst	Mercyhurst Ice Center	Bache	515	1-18-0	0-0-0	
1/4/2012	Lindenwood	0-14	#6 North Dakota	Ralph Engelstad Arena	Fairchild	348	1-19-0	0-0-0	
1/6/2012	Lindenwood	3-4	#10(DIII poll) Concordia (MN)	Moorhead Sports Center	Fairchild	153	1-20-0	0-0-0	
1/7/2012	Lindenwood	6-1	#10(DIII poll) Concordia (MN)	Moorhead Sports Center	Fairchild	172	2-20-0	0-0-0	
1/13/2012	Lindenwood	3-6	Bethel (MN)	Bethel University Arena	Fairchild	144	2-21-0	0-0-0	
1/14/2012	Lindenwood	4-3	Bethel (MN)	Bethel University Arena	Bache	129	3-21-0	0-0-0	
1/15/2012	Lindenwood	5-2	St. Olaf	Northfield Ice Arena	Fairchild	198	4-21-0	0-0-0	
1/20/2012	Lindenwood	4-0	Sacred Heart	Wonderland of Ice	Fairchild	113	5-21-0	0-0-0	
1/21/2012	Lindenwood	5-2	Sacred Heart	Wonderland of Ice	Bache	76	6-21-0	0-0-0	
1/27/2012	^ #3(ACHA poll)Robert Morris (IL)	4-1	Lindenwood	Lindenwood Ice Arena	Fairchild	n/a	6-21-0	1-0-0	
1/28/2012	^ #3(ACHA poll) Robert Morris (IL)	4-1	Lindenwood	Lindenwood Ice Arena	Bache	n/a	6-21-0	2-0-0	
1/29/2012	^ #3(ACHA poll) Robert Morris (IL)	6-0	Lindenwood	Lindenwood Ice Arena	Bache	n/a	6-21-0	3-0-0	
2/10/2012	Lindenwood	6-5 OT	Saint Michael's	Cairns Arena	Fairchild	207	7-21-0	3-0-0	
2/11/2012	Lindenwood	9-1	Saint Michael's	Cairns Arena	Bache	122	8-21-0	3-0-0	

- Note: ^ Denotes an exhibition game.

== Players ==
=== 2011-12 Roster ===
As of September 8, 2011.

Goaltenders
#	State	Player	Catches	Year	Hometown	Previous Team
1	(Ontario)	Briar Bache		Freshman	Barrie, Ontario	Aurora Panthers (PWHL)
29	(Alberta)	Kennedy Rupp	Left	Sophomore	Champion, Alberta	Medicine Hat Hounds AAA (AMMFHL)
31	(Kansas)	Taylor Fairchild		Freshman	Overland Park, Kansas	Little Caesars U19 AAA

Defensemen
#	State	Player	Shoots	Year	Hometown	Previous Team
3	(Ohio)	Kara Goodwin	Left	Freshman	Avon Lake, Ohio	Ohio Flames U19 AAA (MWEHL)
4	(Alberta)	Amy Stober	Right	Sophomore	Hays, Alberta	Medicine Hat Hounds AAA (AMMFHL)
8	(Wisconsin)	Megan Cox		Freshman	New Richmond, Wisconsin	Shattuck St. Mary's
14	(Alberta)	Sydney Gorzitza		Freshman	Vulcan, Alberta	Medicine Hat Hounds AAA (AMMFHL)
15	(Minnesota)	Katie Erickson		Sophomore	Elk River, Minnesota	Elk River High School
18	(Saskatchewan)	Kendra Ganchar	Left	Senior	Saskatoon, Saskatchewan	Battlefords Sharks AAA (SFMHL)
23	(Missouri)	Katherine Bogomolov		Freshman	St. Louis, Missouri	St Louis Lady Blues U19 AAA (MWEHL)
25	(Finland)	Hanna Turpeinen		Freshman	Lieksa, Finland	Ilves HC U18

Forwards
#	State	Player	Shoots	Year	Hometown	Previous Team
2	(Ontario)	Kendra Broad		Freshman	Petrolia, Ontario	Southwest Wildcats (PWHL)
5	(Michigan)	Caitlyn Post		Freshman	Clarkston, Michigan	Little Caesars U19 AAA
7	(Alberta)	Kelsey Talbot (A)	Left	Sophomore	Calgary, Alberta	Calgary Chaos AAA (AMMFHL)
10	(California)	Allysson Arcibal (A)	Right	Sophomore	Vista, California	LA Selects U19 AAA
11	(Alaska)	Erica Wynn	Right	Junior	Anchorage, Alaska	Team Alaska U19 AAA
12	(Minnesota)	Samantha Moore		Freshman	Lakeville, Minnesota	Lakeville South High School
17	(Minnesota)	Mara Post		Freshman	Prior Lake, Minnesota	Lakeville South High School
19	(Saskatchewan)	Sarah Oliphant		Junior	Battleford, Saskatchewan	Lethbridge (CIS)
20	(Alaska)	Samantha Redick	Left	Sophomore	Anchorage, Alaska	Team Alaska U19 AAA
21	(Michigan)	Alyssa West		Freshman	Macomb, Michigan	Little Caesars U19 AAA
26	(Ontario)	Brett Lobreau (C)	Right	Junior	Dryden, Ontario	Dryden High School
27	(Maryland)	Alison Wickenheiser		Freshman	Germantown, Maryland	Washington Pride (JWHL)
28	(Alberta)	Jordyn Constance		Freshman	Calgary, Alberta	Calgary Chaos AAA (AMMFHL)
