= 2008–09 Robert Morris Colonials women's ice hockey season =

American college ice hockey team season

These are the highlights of the 2008-2009 Robert Morris Colonials women's ice hockey season.

== Regular season ==
- On October 3, 2008, Brianna Delaney scored an unassisted goal against number 3 ranked Minnesota to give the Colonials a 2-0 lead after the first period. The Colonials would go on to upset the Golden Gophers by a 3-2 mark.
- On November 1, 2008, Brianna Delaney had the first multi-goal game of her career. She scored two goals (including the game-winning goal) versus the Cornell Big Red, to give RMU a 2-1 win.
- November 14–15:Brianna Delaney scored a goal in back-to-back games versus the Niagara Purple Eagles
- In a 5-4 win over Maine (on November 29), Delaney had a season-high three assists. Goaltender Daneca Butterfield earned her first win of the season with 27 saves along with a .904 save percentage.
- Versus Sacred Heart, Delaney registered eight points in the two game series (played on February 6 and 7, 2009). Delaney had two goals and two assists in each game.
- February 21, the Colonials bested CHA rival Wayne State by a 1-0 mark.

== Players ==
During the 2008-09 season, Delaney skated in all 35 games for the Colonials. She broke the RMU single-season record for points (32) and goals (18). In addition, she tied for first on the team with 14 assists. She was 13th in the NCAA in rookie scoring. She also led the Colonials in shots (113), power play goals (6), and short-handed goals (2). She had eight multi-point games and scored at least one point in 19 games. In the postseason, Delaney scored one goal and one assist in the CHA semifinal versus Wayne State.

== Awards and honors ==
- Brianna Delaney, CHA Rookie of the Week (Week of December 5, 2008)
- Brianna Delaney, CHA Rookie of the Week (Week of February 9, 2009)
- Brianna Delaney, CHA Offensive Player of the Week (Week of October 13, 2008)
- Brianna Delaney, All-CHA Rookie Team (2008–09)
- Brianna Delaney, Robert Morris 2009 Offensive Player of the Year
- Brianna Delaney, Robert Morris 2009 Rookie of the Year
- Brianne McLaughlin, All-CHA First Team (2008–09)
- Whitney Pappas, CHA Defensive Player of the Week (Week of October 12, 2008)

=== CHA All-Academic ===
- Morgan Beikirch
- Daneca Butterfield
- Alissa Dorman
- Mallory Giambra
- Jacki Gibson
- Brianne McLaughlin
- Kristen Miles
- Sara O'Malley
- Whitney Pappas
- Megan Picinic
- Jessica Riley
- Jordan Riley
- Kathryn Traynor
- Samantha Ullrich
- Chelsea Walkland
