= Robert Morris Colonials ice hockey =

Robert Morris Colonials ice hockey may refer to either of the ice hockey teams that represent Robert Morris University:

- Robert Morris Colonials men's ice hockey
- Robert Morris Colonials women's ice hockey
