= 2012–13 Penn State Nittany Lions women's ice hockey season =

- Conference: CHA

Rankings
- USA Today/USA Hockey Magazine: Not ranked
- USCHO.com/CBS College Sports: Not ranked

Record

Coaches and captains
- Head coach: Josh Brandwene
- Assistant coaches: Rob McLean; Graham Pepperman; Sarah Leslie
- Captain(s): Taylor Gross

The Penn State Nittany Lions women's hockey team represented Penn State University in the 2012–13 NCAA Division I women's ice hockey season. Junior Taylor Gross was the team captain.

== Offseason ==
- May 31: Incoming junior transfer Taylor Gross (from the Connecticut Huskies) has been named team captain.

=== Recruiting ===
Player	Nationality	Position	Notes
Kate Christoffersen	United States	Forward	
Darby Kern	United States	Forward	
Kendra Rasmussen	United States	Forward	
Tess Weaver	United States	Forward	
Lindsay Reihl	United States	Defense	
Madison Smiddy	United States	Defense	
Stephanie Walkom	United States	Defense	
Brooke Meyer	United States	Goaltender	

== Exhibition ==
Date	Opponent	Time	Score
Fri. Jan. 4	Chatham (NCAA DIII)	7:00 p.m.	
Sat. Jan. 5	Chatham (NCAA DIII)	7:00 p.m.	

== Regular season ==
=== Standings ===
2012–13 College Hockey America standings
	Conference record							Overall record					
	GP	W	L	T	PTS	GF	GA	GP	W	L	T	GF	GA
#5 Mercyhurst^{†*}	20	17	3	0	34	96	27	37	29	7	1	153	65
Syracuse	20	13	6	1	27	54	32	36	20	15	1	97	74
RIT	20	7	8	5	19	41	45	37	16	16	5	96	79
Robert Morris	20	9	10	1	19	52	50	33	15	15	3	81	77
Lindenwood	20	7	10	3	17	41	71	36	7	26	3	61	151
Penn State	20	1	17	2	4	22	81	35	7	26	2	69	109
Champion: Mercyhurst † indicates conference regular season champion; * indicates conference tournament champion Final rankings: USCHO.com Poll

=== Schedule ===
Date	Opponent	Time	Score
Sat. Oct. 6	at Vermont	7:00 p.m.	5-3
Sun. Oct. 7	at Vermont	2:00 p.m.	1-3
Sat. Oct. 13	SYRACUSE*	7:00 p.m.	0-4
Sun. Oct. 14	SYRACUSE*	2:00 p.m.	0-6
Fri. Oct. 19	at Sacred Heart	7:00 p.m.	1-2
Sat. Oct. 20	at Sacred Heart	2:00 p.m.	6-1
Thu. Oct. 25	RIT*	7:00 p.m.	
Fri. Oct. 26	RIT*	7:00 p.m.	
Fri. Nov. Nov. 2	SACRED HEART	7:00 p.m.	
Sat. Nov. 3	SACRED HEART	2:00 p.m.	
Sat. Nov. 10	ROBERT MORRIS*	2:00 p.m.	
Sun. 11	ROBERT MORRIS*	2:00 p.m.	
Fri. Nov. Nov. 16	at Lindenwood*	7:00 p.m.	
Sat. Nov. 17	at Lindenwood*	2:00 p.m.	
Fri. Nov. 30	at Mercyhurst*	7:00 p.m.	
Sat. Dec. 1	at Mercyhurst*	2:00 p.m.	
Fri. Dec. 7	at St. Lawrence	7:00 p.m.	
Sat. Dec. 8	at St. Lawrence	2:00p.m.	
Fri. Jan. 11	at Union	7:00 p.m.	
Sat. Jan. 12	at Union	4:00 p.m.	
Fri. Jan. 25	at Syracuse*	7:00p.m.	
Sat. Jan. 26	at Syracuse*	2:00p.m.	
Tue. Jan. 29	PRINCETON	7:00 p.m.	
Fri. Feb. 1	MERCYHURST*	2:00 p.m.	
Sat. Feb. 2	MERCYHURST*	2:00 p.m.	
Fri. Feb. 8	LINDENWOOD*	2:00 p.m.	
Sat. Feb. 9	LINDENWOOD*	2:00 p.m.	
Fri. Feb. 15	at RIT*	7:00 p.m.	
Sat. Feb. 16	at RIT*	7:00 p.m.	
Fri. Feb. 22	at Robert Morris*	7:00p.m.	
Sat. Feb. 23	at Robert Morris*	3:00p.m.	

== Roster ==
Number	Name	Class	Position	Height	Former team							
2	Jeanette Bateman	FR	F	5-6	Colorado Select							
3	Cara Mendelson	SO	F/D	5-7	Pittsburgh Elite	alignt="center"	4	Jordin Pardoski	FR	D	5-5	Detroit Honeybaked
5	Stephanie Walkom	FR	D	5-7	Pittsburgh Penguins Elite							
6	Lindsay Reihl	SR	D	5-4	Connecticut Polar Bears							
8	Taylor McGee	FR	D	5-3	Taft School (Conn.)							
10	Micayla Catanzariti	FR	F	5-4	Gilmour Academy (Ohio)							
11	Katie Zinn	FR	F	5-7	Gilmour Academy (Ohio)							
12	Kate Christoffersen	SR	F	5-3	Connecticut Polar Bears							
13	Kendra Rasmussen	FR	F	5-5	Sartell/Sauk Rapids HS							
14	Darby Kern	FR	F	5-11	Pittsburgh Penguins Elite							
15	Jess Desorcie	SO	F	5-4	Connecticut College							
16	Hannah Hoenshell	FR	F	5-3	Texas Alliance Bulldogs							
17	Paige Jahnke	FR	D	5-6	Roseville HS/Minnesota Jr. Whitecaps							
19	Jill Holdcroft	FR	F	5-1	Pittsburgh Penguins Elite							
20	Emily Laurenzi	FR	F	5-2	National Sports Academy (N.Y.)							
21	Sarah Wilkie	FR	D	5-6	Williston Northampton School							
22	Jenna Welch	JR	F	5-8	Connecticut							
23	Birdie Shaw	FR	F	5-2	Detroit Honeybaked							
24	Taylor Gross	JR	F	5-1	Connecticut							
30	Celine Whitlinger	FR	G	5-8	Gilmour Academy (Ohio)							
31	Brooke Meyer	FR	G	5-7	Chicago Huskies							
33	Madison Smiddy	SO	D	5-7	Detroit Honeybaked							
36	Tess Weaver	SO	F	5-5	Pittsburgh Penguins Elite							
37	Nicole Paniccia	JR	G	5-5	Connecticut							
40	Shannon Yoxheimer	FR	F	5-7	North American Hockey Academy (Vt.)							
