= 2012–13 NCAA Division I women's ice hockey season =

- NCAA tournament: 2013
- National championship: Ridder Arena; Minneapolis, MN
- NCAA champion: Minnesota Golden Gophers
- Patty Kazmaier Award: Amanda Kessel ()

The 2012–13 NCAA Division I women's ice hockey season began in October 2012, and ended with the 2013 NCAA Division I Women's Ice Hockey Tournament's championship game in March 2013.

== Offseason ==
- May 31: Taylor Gross has been named captain for the Penn State Nittany Lions in their inaugural NCAA Division I season.

=== Transfers ===
Player	Position	Former team	New team
Hailey Browne	Forward	Mercyhurst	Maine
Kaleigh Chippy	Forward	Niagara	Mercyhurst
Katie Dods	Forward	Niagara	Waterloo (CIS)
Taylor Gross	Forward	Connecticut	Penn State
Jenna Hendrikx	Forward	Niagara	Mercyhurst
Nicole Paniccia	Goaltender	Connecticut	Penn State
Kelsey Welch	Forward	Niagara	Mercyhurst

== Exhibition ==
=== CIS Exhibition ===
Date	NCAA school	CIS school	Score	NCAA goal scorers
Oct 3	St. Lawrence Skating Saints	McGill	5–4 (OT)	Kelly Sabatine (3), Victoria Leimgardt, Dayle Wilkinson
Oct 19	Dartmouth	McGill	Dartmouth, 5–0	Sasha Nanji, Laura Stacey (2), Camille Dumais
Oct 20	Harvard	McGill	Harvard, 4–1	Jillian Dempsey (2), Samantha Reber, Miye D'Oench
Oct 24	Vermont	McGill	Vermont, 1–0	Erin Wente

=== PWHL Exhibition ===
Date	NCAA school	Opponent	Arena	Score	NCAA goal scorers
Sep. 22	Mercyhurst	Stoney Creek Jr. Sabres (PWHL)	Mercyhurst Ice Center	Mercyhurst, 10–1	
Jan. 4	Mercyhurst	Durham Lightning (PWHL)	Mercyhurst Ice Center		

== Regular season ==
=== Season standings ===
2012–13 College Hockey America standings
	Conference record							Overall record					
	GP	W	L	T	PTS	GF	GA	GP	W	L	T	GF	GA
#5 Mercyhurst^{†*}	20	17	3	0	34	96	27	37	29	7	1	153	65
Syracuse	20	13	6	1	27	54	32	36	20	15	1	97	74
RIT	20	7	8	5	19	41	45	37	16	16	5	96	79
Robert Morris	20	9	10	1	19	52	50	33	15	15	3	81	77
Lindenwood	20	7	10	3	17	41	71	36	7	26	3	61	151
Penn State	20	1	17	2	4	22	81	35	7	26	2	69	109
Champion: Mercyhurst † indicates conference regular season champion; * indicates conference tournament champion Final rankings: USCHO.com Poll

#	Team	ECAC record								Overall						
#	Team	PTS	GP	W	L	T	Pct	GF	GA	GP	W	L	T	Pct	GF	GA
1	Cornell	37	22	18	3	1	0.841	84	27	34	27	6	1	0.809	131	55
2t	Clarkson	36	22	18	4	0	0.818	61	28	38	28	10	0	0.737	110	68
2t	Harvard	36	22	17	3	2	0.818	77	25	34	24	7	3	0.750	113	41
4	Quinnipiac	29	22	13	6	3	0.659	66	41	36	20	12	4	0.611	103	75
5	St. Lawrence	28	22	12	6	4	0.636	65	54	38	19	14	5	0.566	98	92
6	Dartmouth	26	22	11	7	4	0.591	58	49	31	16	10	5	0.597	84	71
7	Rensselaer	18	22	8	12	2	0.409	48	59	36	10	22	4	0.333	76	99
8	Colgate	15	22	6	13	3	0.341	40	70	35	11	21	3	0.357	66	122
9	Princeton	14	22	6	14	2	0.318	46	75	29	11	16	2	0.414	66	90
10	Yale	11	22	4	15	3	0.250	35	64	29	5	21	3	0.224	41	88
11	Brown	10	22	5	17	0	0.227	31	61	27	6	20	1	0.241	42	76
12	Union	4	22	0	18	4	0.091	15	73	34	7	23	4	0.265	41	105

Source: ecachockey.com

2012–13 Hockey East Association standings
	Conference							Overall					
	GP	W	L	T	PTS	GF	GA	GP	W	L	T	GF	GA
Boston University	21	18	2	1	37			37	28	6	3		
Boston College	21	17	2	2	36			37	27	7	3		
Northeastern	21	13	7	1	27			36	23	11	2		
New Hampshire	21	10	8	3	23			34	14	16	4		
Providence	21	8	10	3	19			36	15	16	5		
Vermont	21	6	11	4	16			33	8	21	4		
Maine	21	2	16	3	7			33	5	24	4		
Connecticut	21	1	19	1	3			35	3	29	3		
Championship: To Be Determined † indicates conference regular season champion * indicates conference tournament champion National rankings: Conference rankings: Updated February 2, 2013

*Rankings based on number of points in the conference

2012–13 Western Collegiate Hockey Association standings
	Conference								Overall				
	GP	W	L	T	SW	PTS	GF	GA	W	L	T	GF	GA
Minnesota†*	28	28	0	0	0	84	141	27	41	0	0	216	36
Wisconsin	28	17	9	2	2	55	70	46	23	10	2	103	53
North Dakota	28	18	9	1	0	55	96	64	26	12	1	144	88
Minnesota Duluth	28	13	13	2	1	42	72	71	14	16	4	81	85
Ohio State	28	12	13	3	3	42	75	80	19	15	3	107	96
Minnesota State	28	6	17	5	1	24	46	95	10	21	5	69	122
St. Cloud State	28	5	21	2	1	18	37	93	9	24	3	57	113
Bemidji State	28	5	22	1	0	16	40	101	6	26	2	49	127

Source: wcha.com

== Awards and honors ==
=== Patty Kazmaier Award finalists ===
- Amanda Kessel, Winner, Minnesota Golden Gophers
- Megan Bozek, Minnesota Golden Gophers
- Noora Raty, Minnesota Golden Gophers

=== AHCA Coach of the Year ===
- Brad Frost, Minnesota

== All-America selections ==
=== First team ===
- Forward, Brianne Jenner, 2012–13 First Team All-America selection
- Forward, Amanda Kessel, 2012–13 First Team All-America selection
- Forward, Jocelyne Lamoureux, 2012–13 First Team All-America selection
- Defense, Monique Lamoureux-Kolls, 2012–13 First Team All-America selection
- Defense, Megan Bozek, 2012–13 First Team All-America selection
- Goaltender, Noora Raty, 2012–13 First Team All-America selection

=== Second team ===
- Forward, Alex Carpenter, 2012–13 Second Team All-America selection
- Forward, Kendall Coyne, 2012–13 Second Team All-America selection
- Forward, Brianna Decker, 2012–13 Second Team All-America selection
- Defense, Blake Bolden, 2012–13 Second Team All-America selection
- Defense, Lauriane Rougeau, 2012–13 Second Team All-America selection
- Goaltender, Alex Rigsby, 2012–13 Second Team All-America selection

== See also ==
- National Collegiate Women's Ice Hockey Championship
- 2012–13 CHA women's ice hockey season
- 2012–13 ECAC women's ice hockey season
- 2012–13 Hockey East women's ice hockey season
- 2012–13 WCHA women's ice hockey season
