= 2012–13 ECAC women's ice hockey season =

Collegiate women's ice hockey season

The 2012–13 ECAC women's ice hockey season marked the continuation of the annual tradition of competitive ice hockey among ECAC women's ice hockey members.

== Regular season ==
=== Standings ===
#	Team	ECAC record								Overall						
#	Team	PTS	GP	W	L	T	Pct	GF	GA	GP	W	L	T	Pct	GF	GA
1	Cornell	37	22	18	3	1	0.841	84	27	34	27	6	1	0.809	131	55
2t	Clarkson	36	22	18	4	0	0.818	61	28	38	28	10	0	0.737	110	68
2t	Harvard	36	22	17	3	2	0.818	77	25	34	24	7	3	0.750	113	41
4	Quinnipiac	29	22	13	6	3	0.659	66	41	36	20	12	4	0.611	103	75
5	St. Lawrence	28	22	12	6	4	0.636	65	54	38	19	14	5	0.566	98	92
6	Dartmouth	26	22	11	7	4	0.591	58	49	31	16	10	5	0.597	84	71
7	Rensselaer	18	22	8	12	2	0.409	48	59	36	10	22	4	0.333	76	99
8	Colgate	15	22	6	13	3	0.341	40	70	35	11	21	3	0.357	66	122
9	Princeton	14	22	6	14	2	0.318	46	75	29	11	16	2	0.414	66	90
10	Yale	11	22	4	15	3	0.250	35	64	29	5	21	3	0.224	41	88
11	Brown	10	22	5	17	0	0.227	31	61	27	6	20	1	0.241	42	76
12	Union	4	22	0	18	4	0.091	15	73	34	7	23	4	0.265	41	105

Source: ecachockey.com

=== In-season honors ===
==== Players of the week ====
Week	Player of the week
October 11	Kelly Babstock, Quinnipiac
October 18	Kelly Babstock, Quinnipiac
October 25	Jamie Lee Rattray, Clarkson
November 2	
November 9	
November 16	

==== Defensive players of the week ====
Week	Player of the week
October 11	Erica Howe, Clarkson
October 18	Ashlynne Rando, Colgate
October 25	Shenae Lundberg, Union
November 2	
November 9	
November 16	

==== Rookies of the week ====
Week	Rookie of the week
October 11	Alexa Gruschow, Rensselaer
October 18	Shannon MacAulay, Clarkson
October 25	Erin Ambrose, Clarkson
November 2	
November 9	
November 16	

== See also ==
- National Collegiate Women's Ice Hockey Championship
- 2012–13 CHA women's ice hockey season
- 2012–13 Hockey East women's ice hockey season
- 2012–13 WCHA women's ice hockey season
