= 2012–13 Lindenwood Lady Lions ice hockey season =

2012–13 Lindenwood Lions women's ice hockey season
- Conference: CHA
- Home ice: Lindenwood Ice Arena

Record

Coaches and captains
- Head coach: Vince O'Mara
- Assistant coaches: Katie Kells; Rick Pratt; Cory Whitaker
- Captain: Brett Lobreau
- Alternate captain(s): Allysson Arcibal, Kelsey Talbot

The Lindenwood Lady Lions represent Lindenwood University. The 2012–13 Lindenwood Lady Lions ice hockey season was the team's tenth season and their second season as a member of the National Collegiate Athletic Association (NCAA). The team is coached by Vince O'Mara and they play their home games at Lindenwood Ice Arena. The 2012-13 season is Lindenwood's first as a member of College Hockey America, after the team competed as an NCAA Division I independent program in 2011–12 season.

== Offseason ==
- July 2, 2012: Cory Whitaker joined the program as a goalie/video coach. Prior to joining the Lindenwood coaching staff, Whitaker coached five seasons for Grand Valley State's American Collegiate Hockey Association Division I women's ice hockey team where he led the Lakers to the ACHA national tournament three times in five years. Whitaker was the goaltender for the GVSU men's ACHA Division II team from 1996-2001. During his time at Grand Valley State, he recorded a .903 save percentage and played more than 2,700 minutes. In 2001, he was named to the first-team all-conference.
- July 14, 2012: Lindenwood was granted provisional status by the NCAA in July 2012. During the provisional year, the university will follow all NCAA regulations but will not be eligible for postseason NCAA competition.

=== Recruiting ===
- Lindenwood announced its second NCAA recruiting class on May 3, 2012. The 2012-13 recruiting class includes six incoming freshman and two transfers:

| Player | Nationality | Position | Notes |
| Nicole Hensley | United States | Goaltender | Hensley played for the Colorado Selects Under-19 team. Notched 4-7-3 record with a 3.62 goals against average and .902 save percentage in the 2011-12 season. |
| Lyndsay Kirkham | Canada | Forward | Kirkham played for the Edge School and for Medicine Hat in Alberta Major Midget Female Hockey League (AMMFHL) and led that team in scoring in 2011-12. |
| Brooke Peden | Canada | Defense | Peden competed with the 2012 Provincial Champion, Edmonton Thunderof the AMMFHL. |
| Jocelyn Slattery | United States | Forward | Slattery is a junior transfer from the Connecticut. She recorded 14 goals and 22 assists in 68 games for the Huskies over two seasons. |
| Rachel Weich | United States | Defense | Weich played for the National Sports Academy and recorded 6 goals and 35 assists in 69 games with the team in 2011-12. |
| Kara Wendell | United States | Forward | Wendell was captain of Champlin Park High School, where she scored 14 goals and 15 assists in 25 games. She is a two-sport athlete and is also an incoming freshman for the Lindenwood women's lacrosse team. |
| Chloe Williams | Canada | Defense | Williams was the captain of the Colorado Selects Under-19 where she was a teammate of Nicole Hensley. |
| Chelsea Witwicke | United States | Forward | Junior transfer from Niagara. |

== Regular season ==
=== Lindenwood Statistics Nationally ===
- Lindenwood University Statistics

| Name | Stat | Ranking Nationally |
|---|---|---|
| Scoring Offense | 1.00 G/GM (0G) | #8 |
| Scoring Defense | 5.50 G/GM (0GA) | #8 |
| Scoring Margin | 9 | NA |
| Penalty Minutes | 23.50 PIM/GM (47 PM) | #1 |
| Power Play | 10% | #6 |
| Penalty Kill | 71.4% | #5 |
| Winning Percentage | 0-0-0 0% | NA |
| Unbeaten Streak | 0g 0-0-0 | NA |

=== Rankings ===
- Lindenwood University Rankings

| Poll | Affiliation | Rank |
|---|---|---|
| USCHO.com Coaches Poll | National | # |
| USA Today Poll | National | # |
| INCH Power Rankings | National | # |
| NCAA Pairwise Rank | Post-Season | # |
| USCHO KRACH Rank | Post-Season | # |
| NCAA Ratings Percentage Index | Post-Season | # |

=== Schedule ===
| Date | Time | Visitor | Score | Home | Location | Decision | Attendance | Conference | Overall | Box score |
| 9/28/2012 | 6:00 p.m. | Lindenwood | 0-4 | Ohio State | OSU Ice Rink | Knapp | 395 | 0-0-0 | 0-1-0 | |
| 9/29/2012 | 3:00 p.m. | Lindenwood | 2-7 | Ohio State | OSU Ice Rink | Knapp | 299 | 0-0-0 | 0-2-0 | |
| 10/5/2012 | 7:00 p.m. | #4 Wisconsin | | Lindenwood | Lindenwood Ice Arena | | | | | |
| 10/6/2012 | 2:00 p.m. | #4 Wisconsin | | Lindenwood | Lindenwood Ice Arena | | | | | |
| 10/12/2012 | 7:00 p.m. | Lindenwood | | Minnesota State-Mankato | All Seasons Arena | | | | | |
| 10/13/2012 | 3:00 p.m. | Lindenwood | | Minnesota State-Mankato | All Seasons Arena | | | | | |
| 11/2/2012 | 7:00 p.m. | Mercyhurst | | Lindenwood | Lindenwood Ice Arena | | | | | |
| 11/3/2012 | 2:00 p.m. | Mercyhurst | | Lindenwood | Lindenwood Ice Arena | | | | | |
| 11/9/2012 | 2:00 p.m. | Lindenwood | | St. Cloud State | National Hockey Center | | | | | |
| 11/10/2012 | 2:00 p.m. | Lindenwood | | St. Cloud State | National Hockey Center | | | | | |
| 11/16/2012 | 7:00 p.m. | Penn State | | Lindenwood | Lindenwood Ice Arena | | | | | |
| 11/17/2012 | 2:00 p.m. | Penn State | | Lindenwood | Lindenwood Ice Arena | | | | | |
| 11/30/2012 | 7:00 p.m. | St. Cloud State | | Lindenwood | Lindenwood Ice Arena | | | | | |
| 12/1/2012 | 2:00 p.m. | St. Cloud State | | Lindenwood | Lindenwood Ice Arena | | | | | |
| 12/15/2012 | 6:00 p.m. | Lindenwood | | Rochester Institute of Technology | Frank Ritter Memorial Ice Arena | | | | | |
| 12/16/2012 | 1:00 p.m. | Lindenwood | | Rochester Institute of Technology | Frank Ritter Memorial Ice Arena | | | | | |
| 1/1/2013 | 7:00 p.m. | Minnesota State-Mankato | | Lindenwood | Lindenwood Ice Arena | | | | | |
| 1/2/2013 | 2:00 p.m. | Minnesota State-Mankato | | Lindenwood | Lindenwood Ice Arena | | | | | |
| 1/4/2013 | 7:00 p.m. | North Dakota | | Lindenwood | Lindenwood Ice Arena | | | | | |
| 1/5/2013 | 2:00 p.m. | North Dakota | | Lindenwood | Lindenwood Ice Arena | | | | | |
| 1/11/2013 | 2:00 p.m. | Lindenwood | | Robert Morris (PA) | 84 Lumber Arena | | | | | |
| 1/12/2013 | 2:00 p.m. | Lindenwood | | Robert Morris (PA) | 84 Lumber Arena | | | | | |
| 1/18/2013 | 7:00 p.m. | Syracuse | | Lindenwood | Lindenwood Ice Arena | | | | | |
| 1/19/2013 | 2:00 p.m. | Syracuse | | Lindenwood | Lindenwood Ice Arena | | | | | |
| 1/25/2013 | 2:00 p.m. | Lindenwood | | Mercyhurst | Mercyhurst Ice Center | | | | | |
| 1/26/2013 | 12:00 p.m. | Lindenwood | | Mercyhurst | Mercyhurst Ice Center | | | | | |
| 2/1/2013 | 7:00 p.m. | Rochester Institute of Technology | | Lindenwood | Lindenwood Ice Arena | | | | | |
| 2/2/2013 | 2:00 p.m. | Rochester Institute of Technology | | Lindenwood | Lindenwood Ice Arena | | | | | |
| 2/8/2013 | 1:00 p.m. | Lindenwood | | Penn State | Penn State Ice Pavilion | | | | | |
| 2/9/2013 | 1:00 p.m. | Lindenwood | | Penn State | Penn State Ice Pavilion | | | | | |
| 2/15/2013 | 7:00 p.m. | Robert Morris (PA) | | Lindenwood | Lindenwood Ice Arena | | | | | |
| 2/16/2013 | 2:00 p.m. | Robert Morris (PA) | | Lindenwood | Lindenwood Ice Arena | | | | | |
| 2/22/2013 | 6:00 p.m. | Lindenwood | | Syracuse | Tennity Ice Skating Pavilion | | | | | |
| 2/23/2013 | 1:00 p.m. | Lindenwood | | Syracuse | Tennity Ice Skating Pavilion | | | | | |

Note: All times are Central.
