= 2012–13 Boston College Eagles women's ice hockey season =

- Conference: HEA

Rankings
- USA Today/USA Hockey Magazine: Not ranked
- USCHO.com/CBS College Sports: Not ranked

Record

Coaches and captains
- Head coach: Katie King
- Captain: Blake Bolden
- Alternate captain: Meagan Mangene

The Boston College Eagles represented Boston College in the Hockey East Association.

== Offseason ==
- August 21: Blake Bolden was appointed team captain while Meagan Mangene was named assistant captain for the season.

=== Recruiting ===
Player	Nationality	Position	Notes
Kaliya Johnson	United States	Forward	Attended North American Hockey Academy
Dana Trivigno	United States	Forward	Competed at Shattuck St. Mary’s
Meghan Grieves	United States	Forward	Played for Culver Military Academy
Lexi Bender	United States	Defense	Competed at Shattuck St. Mary’s
Haley Skarupa	United States	Forward	Member of United States Under-18 National Team
Taylor Blake	United States	Goaltender	Attended North American Hockey Academy

== Regular season ==
=== Standings ===
2012–13 Hockey East Association standings
	Conference							Overall					
	GP	W	L	T	PTS	GF	GA	GP	W	L	T	GF	GA
Boston University	21	18	2	1	37			37	28	6	3		
Boston College	21	17	2	2	36			37	27	7	3		
Northeastern	21	13	7	1	27			36	23	11	2		
New Hampshire	21	10	8	3	23			34	14	16	4		
Providence	21	8	10	3	19			36	15	16	5		
Vermont	21	6	11	4	16			33	8	21	4		
Maine	21	2	16	3	7			33	5	24	4		
Connecticut	21	1	19	1	3			35	3	29	3		
Championship: To Be Determined † indicates conference regular season champion * indicates conference tournament champion National rankings: Conference rankings: Updated February 2, 2013

*Rankings based on number of points in the conference

=== Schedule ===
Date	Opponent	Result	Record	Conference Record

== Roster ==
Number	Player	Position	Height	Former team
6	Johnson Kaliya	Forward	5-7	North American Hockey Academy
7	Dru Burns	Defense	5-4	Shattuck St. Mary's
8	Dana Trivigno	Forward	5-8	Shattuck St. Mary's
9	Taylor Wasylk	Forward	5-10	Little Caesar’s Under-19
10	Blake Bolden	Defense	5-7	Northwood School
11	Caitlin Walsh	Forward	5-5	Rivers School
12	Amanda Movsessian	Forward	5-3	Lawrence Academy
13	Elizabeth Olchowski	Forward	5-10	Deerfield Academy
14	Emily Pfalzer	Defense	5-2	Mississauga (PWHL)
15	Emily Field	Forward	5-6	Lawrence Academy
17	Meghan Graves	Forward	5-8	Culver Academy
18	Ashley Motherwell	Forward	5-8	Lawrence Academy
19	Danielle Doherty	Forward	5-4	Lawrence Academy
21	Lexi Bender	Defense	5-8	Shattuck St. Mary’s
22	Haley Skarupa	Forward	5-5	Left
24	Meagan Mangene	Defense	5-3	Right
25	Jackie Young	Defense	5-7	Right
30	Ashley Holt	Goaltender	5-6	Left
33	Kimberley Newell	Goaltender	5-9	Left

== Awards and honors ==
- Emily Field, Runner-Up, Hockey East Player of the Month (Month of December 2012)
- Corinne Boyles, Runner-Up, Hockey East Goaltender of the Month (Month of December 2012)
