= Brianne McLaughlin =

American women's ice hockey player

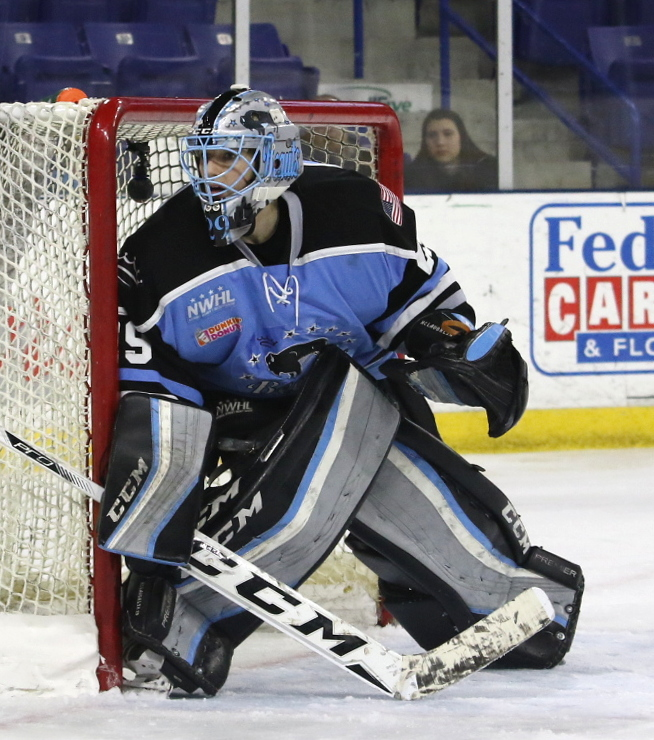
- Brianne McLaughlin playing for the Buffalo Beauts in the Isobel Cup Final in 2017
- Born: June 20, 1987 (age 39) Elyria, Ohio, USA
- Height: 5 ft 8 in (173 cm)
- Weight: 132 lb (60 kg; 9 st 6 lb)
- Position: Goaltender
- Caught: Left
- Played for: Buffalo Beauts; Robert Morris Colonials
- National team: United States
- Playing career: 2005–2017
Medal record
Women's ice hockey
Representing United States
Olympic Games
Silver medal – second place	2010 Vancouver	Tournament
Silver medal – second place	2014 Sochi	Tournament
IIHF World Women's Championships
Gold medal – first place	2011 Switzerland	Tournament
Gold medal – first place	2013 Canada	Tournament
Silver medal – second place	2012 United States	Tournament
Women's 4 Nations Cup
Gold medal – first place	2011 Sweden	Tournament

Brianne Lea McLaughlin (born June 20, 1987) is an American former ice hockey goaltender. During her career, she played for the United States women's national ice hockey team and the Buffalo Beauts of the National Women's Hockey League (NWHL).

== Playing career ==
McLaughlin attended Elyria Catholic High School in Elyria, Ohio. She went on to play ice hockey for four years (2006 to 2009) at Robert Morris Colonials women's ice hockey program. McLaughlin set an NCAA record of 3,809 career saves. Overall, she stopped 3,809 of the 4,188 shots she faced, resulting in a .910 save percentage. She recorded at least 50 saves four times as a senior with the Robert Morris Colonials in 2008–09. In the 2010 CWHL Draft, she was drafted 24th overall by the Burlington Barracudas but never played a game for them.

=== Team USA ===
In 2008, McLaughlin played one game in the United States Women's Under-22 series against Canada. She stopped 20 of 26 shots in just under 44 minutes. She made her Olympic debut for the US on February 14, 2010. It was a 12–1 United States victory over China in the preliminary round. In a game versus Finland at the 2012 IIHF Women's World Championship, Brianne McLaughlin made nine saves as she posted a shutout in an 11–0 victory. McLaughlin was named to her second Olympic team for the 2014 Winter Olympics.

=== Buffalo Beauts ===
McLaughlin joined the Buffalo Beauts for the NWHL's inaugural 2015/16 season as the franchise's starting goaltender and was selected to play in the league's All-Star Game that season. In July 2016, McLaughlin re-signed with Buffalo Beauts for the 2016/17 season, signing a one-year $17,000 contract.

== Career statistics ==
Year	Team	Event	Result	GP	W	L	T/OT	MIN	GA	SO	GAA	SV%
2010	USA	OG	2nd place, silver medalist(s)	1	0	0	0	8:00	1	0	7.50	0.500

== Awards and honors ==
- All-CHA First Team (2008–09)
- CHA All-Academic Team (2008–09)

Silver medal – 2010 Winter Olympics in Hockey

Silver medal – 2014 Winter Olympics in Hockey

== New venture ==
McLaughlin currently owns and operates a goalie training facility in Neville Island, Pennsylvania, 15 minutes northwest of Pittsburgh.
