= Robert Morris Colonials women's ice hockey =

- Current season
- University: Robert Morris University
- Conference: AHA
- Head coach: Logan Bittle; 1 season, 15–19–1
- Arena: Clearview Arena; Neville Township, Pennsylvania
- Colors: Blue, white, and red

NCAA tournament appearances
- 2017, 2021

Conference tournament champions
- CHA: 2012, 2017, 2021

Robert Morris Colonials women's ice hockey is a college ice hockey program representing Robert Morris University in NCAA Division I as a member of the Atlantic Hockey America (AHA) conference.

The program was suspended, along with the men's team, after an announcement by the university on May 26, 2021. On December 17, 2021, it was announced both programs would be reinstated for the 2023–24 season. Shortly after that season, the Atlantic Hockey Association and College Hockey America, respectively home to the Colonials men's and women's teams, merged to form Atlantic Hockey America.

== History ==
March 31, 2004: Robert Morris University announced that an NCAA Division I women's ice hockey team would compete, in the College Hockey America (CHA) Conference, starting with the 2005–06 season.

Kevin McGonagle was named the first head coach, but following a 1–7–0 start he was dismissed[2]. Assistant coach Jody Katz[1] was named the interim head coach for the rest of the season, and men's assistant coach Nate Handrahan was named new head coach for the 2006–07 campaign.

Nate Handrahan was head coach for five years from the 2006–07 through the 2010–11 seasons. He successfully built a stable program, bringing talented players into the program who would excel after his tenure. and amassed a 52–111–14 record, before taking the head coaching job of the Ohio State women's hockey program.

Paul Colontino was named head coach for the 2011–12 season, and remains in the position. He made the Colonials a competitive team, finishing with more wins than losses in 5 of 6 years. In his first year, Colontino led the Colonials to their first CHA Tournament championship. As the CHA had not automatic berth in the NCAA tournament at the time, their CHA win ended their season.

The most successful season for the Colonials was the 2016–17 season. Their 24–5–6 record (15–3–2 in the CHA) earned them their first year-ending ranking, 8th, in both the USCHO and USA Today polls. They won the CHA regular season championship for the first time, and took the Tournament Championship as well, to earn their first entry to the NCAA national championship. They were defeated by top ranked Wisconsin 0–7 in the first round of the NCAA Tournament. Colonials forward Jaycee Gebhard scored 44 points on the season, making her the highest scoring first year player in the country for the season. Brittany Howard became the first Colonial player to be named CHA Player of the Year.

The Colonials went on to finish at the top of the CHA standings in 2017-18 and 2018–19, marking three years in a row that they won the regular season championship. They went to four straight championship games, ending the season as conference runner up in 2018, 2019 and 2020.

Over the course of four seasons (2016–20), the Colonials posted an overall record of 62-22-12 (.777 points percentage), including the program's first ever NCAA Tournament appearance in 2017. The program qualified for the 2021 NCAA National Collegiate Women's Ice Hockey Tournament, ranked as the #8 seed.

On February 3, 2022 Logan Bittle was named the head coach for the program's return in the 2023-2024 season

=== Year by year ===
Won championship	Lost championship	Conference champions	League leader

Year	Coach	W	L	T	Conference	Conf. W	Conf. L	Conf. T	Finish	Conference Tournament	NCAA Tournament
2025–26	Logan Bittle	13	21	2	AHA	8	14	2	6th AHA	Won First round vs. Delaware (3–2 OT); Lost Quarterfinals vs. Lindenwood (1–3)	Did not qualify
2024–25	Logan Bittle	8	24	3	AHA	2	16	2	6th AHA	Lost Quarterfinals vs. Syracuse (2–3 2OT)	Did not qualify
2023–24	Logan Bittle	15	19	1	CHA	11	8	1	3rd CHA	Lost Semifinals vs. Mercyhurst (5–0, 2–5, 1–6)	Did not qualify
2022–23	Program was suspended by the university										
2021–22	Program was suspended by the university										
2020–21	Paul Colontino	16	8	1	CHA	11	7	1	3rd CHA	Won Quarterfinals vs. RIT (4-0); Won Semifinals vs. Mercyhurst (3-2 OT); Won Championship vs. Syracuse (1-0)	2nd Appearance; Lost Quarterfinal vs. Northeastern (1-5)
2019–20	Paul Colontino	20	12	4	CHA	13	5	2	2nd CHA	Won Semifinals vs. Syracuse (5–2); Lost Championship vs. Mercyhurst (1–2 OT)	Did not qualify
2018–19	Paul Colontino	16	14	6	CHA	13	4	3	1st CHA	Won Semifinals vs. Penn State (2–1); Lost Championship vs. Syracuse (2–6)	Did not qualify
2017–18	Paul Colontino	21	8	4	CHA	14	3	3	1st CHA	Won Semifinals vs. Penn State (7–2); Lost Championship vs. Mercyhurst (3–5)	Did not qualify
2016–17	Paul Colontino	24	5	6	CHA	15	3	2	1st CHA	Won Semifinals vs. Lindenwood (2–1); Won Championship vs. Syracuse (2–0)	1st Appearance; Lost Quarterfinal vs. Wisconsin (0-7)
2015–16	Paul Colontino	17	16	5	CHA	7	9	4	4th CHA	Won Quarterfinals vs. Lindenwood (3–4, 3–1, 5–1); Lost Semifinals vs. Mercyhurst (2–4)	Did not qualify
2014–15	Paul Colontino	11	19	5	CHA	8	8	4	4th CHA	Lost Quarterfinals vs. RIT (1–3, 0–1)	Did not qualify
2013–14	Paul Colontino	24	8	3	CHA	13	5	2	2nd CHA	Lost Semifinals vs. RIT (1–4)	Did not qualify
2012–13	Paul Colontino	15	15	3	CHA	9	10	1	4th CHA	Won Quarterfinals vs. Lindenwood (2–1 3OT, 2–0); Lost Semifinals vs. Mercyhurst (1–2)	Did not qualify
2011–12	Paul Colontino	19	9	4	CHA	6	3	3	2nd CHA	Won Semifinals vs. Niagara (3–2); Won Championship vs. Mercyhurst (3–2)	Did not qualify
2010–11	Nate Handrahan	6	21	7	CHA	2	9	5	4th CHA	Won Quarterfinals vs. Wayne State (4–2); Lost Semifinals vs. Mercyhurst (1–3)	Did not qualify
2009–10	Nate Handrahan	11	24	1	CHA	3	12	1	5th CHA	Won Quarterfinals vs. Wayne State (3–1); Lost Semifinals vs. Mercyhurst (1–7)	Did not qualify
2008–09	Nate Handrahan	12	20	3	CHA	5	9	2	3rd CHA	Lost Semifinals vs. Wayne State (3–4)	Did not qualify
2007–08	Nate Handrahan	12	22	1	CHA	2	10	0	4th CHA	Lost Semifinals vs. Mercyhurst (0–4)	Did not qualify
2006–07	Nate Handrahan	11	22	2	CHA	1	11	0	4th CHA	Lost Semifinals vs. Marcyhurst (2–5)	Did not qualify
2005–06	Kevin McGonagle	5	24	2	CHA	1	9	1	4th CHA	Lost Semifinals vs. Mercyhurst (0–9)	Did not qualify
2004–05	Jody Katz	4	17	2							

== Awards and honors ==
- Brittany Howard, 2018 Dapper Dan Sportswoman of the Year
- Brittany Howard, 2017-18 Second Team All-America
- Brittany Howard, 2016-17 CHA Player of the Year
- Kirsten Welsh, 2017-18 CHA Defender of the Year
- Jaycee Gebhard, 2017-18 CHA Rookie of the Year
- Jaycee Gebhard, 2017-18 Women's Hockey Commissioners Association National Rookie of the Year
- Paul Colontino, 2016-17 CHA Coach of the Year
- Paul Colontino, 2011-12 USCHO Women's Coach of the Year
- Paul Colontino, 2011-12 CHA Coach of the Year
- Lexi Templeman: 2021 College Hockey America All-Conference First Team

== Colonials in professional hockey ==
= CWHL All-Star	= NWHL/PHF All-Star	= Clarkson Cup Champion	= Isobel Cup Champion

Player	Position	Team(s)	League(s)	Years	Clarkson Cup	Isobel Cup
Michaela Boyle	Forward	Buffalo Beauts	PHF	1		
Delayne Brian	Goaltender	Calgary Inferno	CWHL	6	1 (2016) Playoff MVP	
Anjelica Diffendal	Forward	Buffalo Beauts	PHF	2		
Megan Eady		Melbourne Ice; SDE	AWIHL; SDHL			
Anissa Gamble	Forward	Toronto Furies	CWHL	1		
Jaycee Gebhard	Forward	Brynäs IF	SDHL	1		
Brittany Howard	Forward	Toronto Six; Toronto Furies; Dream Gap Tour	PHF; CWHL; PWHPA			
Brianne McLaughlin	Goaltender	Buffalo Beauts	NWHL			1 (2017)

== International ==
=== Olympians ===
Player	Position	Nationality	Event	Result
Brianne McLaughlin	Goaltender	United States	2010 Winter Olympics	Silver
Brianne McLaughlin	Goaltender	United States	2014 Winter Olympics	Silver

== See also ==
- Robert Morris Colonials men's ice hockey
- List of college women ice hockey coaches with 250 wins
