= 2012–13 Boston University Terriers women's ice hockey season =

- Conference: Hockey East
- Home ice: Agganis Arena

Record

Coaches and captains
- Head coach: Brian Durocher
- Captain(s): Jill Cardella; Marie-Philip Poulin

The Boston University Terriers women's ice hockey team represented Boston University in the 2012–13 NCAA Division I women's ice hockey season.

== Offseason ==
- May 11, 2012: Terriers head coach Brian Durocher announced that the captains for the 2012-13 campaign will be Marie-Philip Poulin and Jill Cardella.

=== Recruiting ===
Player	Position	Nationality	Notes
Diana Bennett	Forward	United States	

== Exhibition ==
Date	Opponent	Location	Time	Score	Record	Conference Record	Goal scorers

== Regular season ==
=== Standings ===
2012–13 Hockey East Association standings
	Conference							Overall					
	GP	W	L	T	PTS	GF	GA	GP	W	L	T	GF	GA
Boston University	21	18	2	1	37			37	28	6	3		
Boston College	21	17	2	2	36			37	27	7	3		
Northeastern	21	13	7	1	27			36	23	11	2		
New Hampshire	21	10	8	3	23			34	14	16	4		
Providence	21	8	10	3	19			36	15	16	5		
Vermont	21	6	11	4	16			33	8	21	4		
Maine	21	2	16	3	7			33	5	24	4		
Connecticut	21	1	19	1	3			35	3	29	3		
Championship: To Be Determined † indicates conference regular season champion * indicates conference tournament champion National rankings: Conference rankings: Updated February 2, 2013

*Rankings based on number of points in the conference

=== Schedule ===
Date	Opponent	Location	Time	Score	Record	Conference Record	Goal scorers

==== Conference record ====
WCHA school	Record
Boston College	
Connecticut	
Maine	
New Hampshire	
Northeastern	
Providence	
Vermont	

== Awards and honors ==
- Sarah Lefort, Runner-Up, Hockey East Rookie of the Month (Month of December 2012)
- Marie-Philip Poulin, Runner-Up, Hockey East Player of the Month (Month of December 2012)
- Kerrin Sperry, Runner-Up, Hockey East Goaltender of the Month (Month of December 2012)
