= Frank Ritter Memorial Ice Arena =

Ice arena in Rochester, New York

- The Ritter
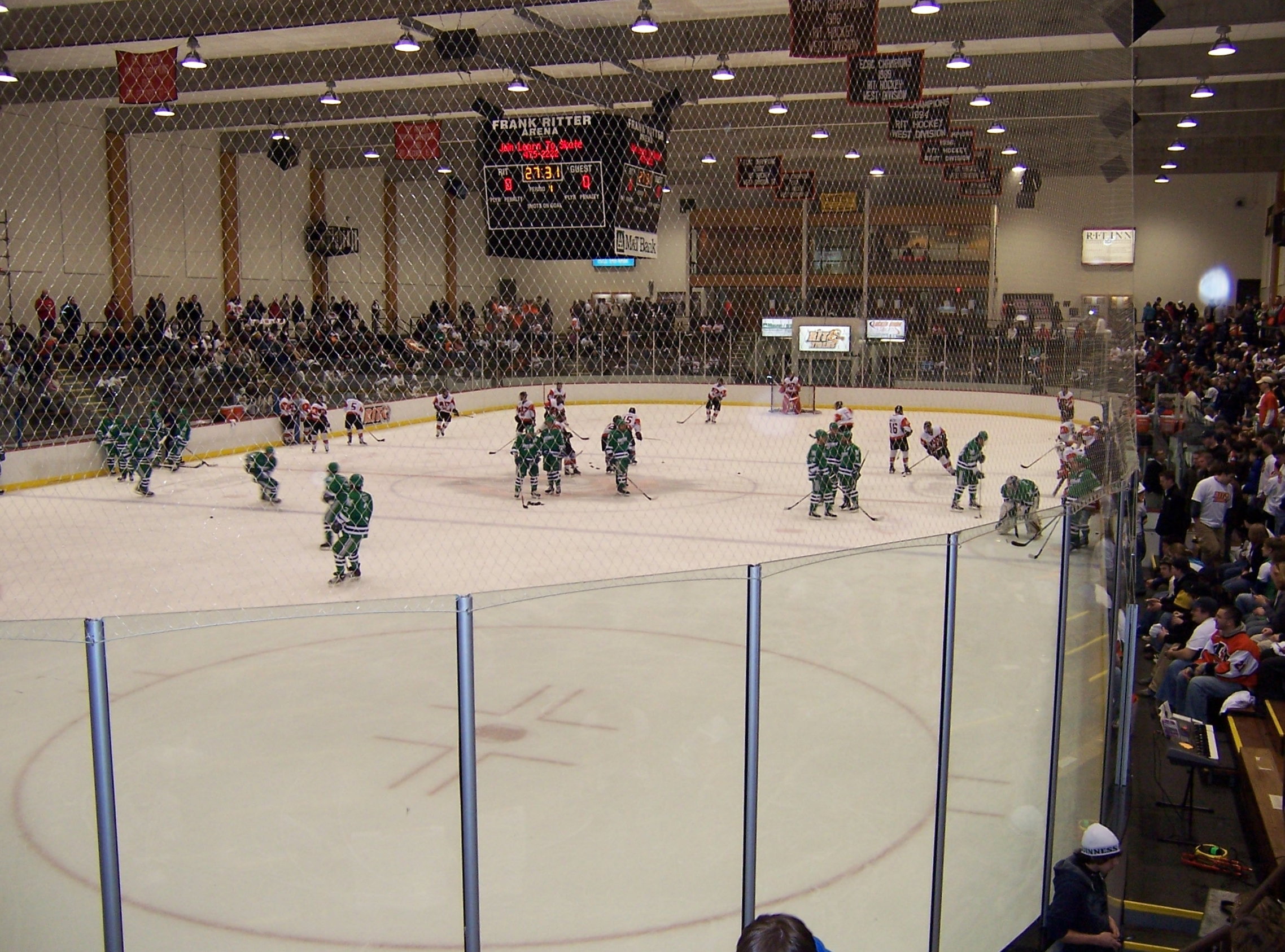
- Interactive map of Frank Ritter Memorial Ice Arena
- Location: 51 Lomb Memorial Drive; Rochester, New York 14623
- Coordinates: 43°5′7″N 77°40′26″W
- Owner: Rochester Institute of Technology
- Operator: Rochester Institute of Technology
- Capacity: 2,100 (hockey)
- Field size: 185 ft x 85 ft (56 m x 26 m)

Construction
- Opened: 1968
- Architect: Roche-Dinkeloo

Tenants
- RIT Tigers men's ice hockey (1968–2014); RIT Tigers women's ice hockey (1975–2014); Genesee Figure Skating Club (1968–2021)

The Frank Ritter Memorial Ice Arena, known colloquially as "The Ritter", is an arena on the campus of the Rochester Institute of Technology in Henrietta, a suburb of Rochester, New York, United States. It is the former home to the RIT Tigers ice hockey teams and the Genesee Figure Skating Club. Its official capacity for ice hockey games was 2,100.

The building was erected in 1968 when RIT moved from downtown Rochester to a new suburban campus in nearby Henrietta. Frank Ritter, a furniture maker famous for his dental chairs, helped found the Mechanics Institute, a forerunner of the Rochester Institute of Technology, in 1885. The Ritter-Clark Rink on the downtown campus had previously been named in part for Frank Ritter. Frank Ritter Shumway, Ritter's grandson and a major figure in U.S. Figure Skating, was a generous benefactor of RIT, and he ensured that the ice rink on the new campus was named for his grandfather.

The arena was also home to the Genesee Figure Skating Club, founded in 1955 by F. Ritter Shumway.

The ice surface measures 85 feet by 185 feet (26 m by 56 m), with the goals at the north and south ends. The home bench, scorer's table, and penalty boxes are on the west side; the visiting bench is on the east side, with the men's and women's home locker rooms underneath the east bleachers. The Pike Press Box (room for 16 with 5 telephones and Ethernet access) and the President's Box (stadium-style seating for 16) are two stories up from the ice surface, on the south side of the rink.

A new scoreboard was purchased and installed in time for RIT's inaugural Men's Division I season, 2005–2006. Previous renovations in 2000 improved the lighting, acoustics, and concessions in the arena. In 2010, the Institute announced a $3.5 million expansion project to include new locker rooms, offices, video rooms, and training rooms.

The arena was ranked the second-best rink in the ECAC West (out of six) in 2003. (The only better rink was the Utica Memorial Auditorium, which is a professional-level hockey arena.) The Ritter was the third-highest-capacity rink in Atlantic Hockey (behind Army's Tate Rink and Air Force's Cadet Field House Ice Arena and tied with Niagara's Dwyer Arena). In 2009, USCHO.com national columnist Dave Starman wrote that the Ritter was "A Great Atmosphere More Should Experience", explaining: "Between the pep band, the small size of the arena (2,100), and perhaps the best public address announcer in college hockey, the RIT Tigers have created a buzz on campus that more people should see on a national broadcast."

In 2011, Rochester Institute of Technology began raising funds for the Gene Polisseni Center, which became the eventual replacement home to the varsity hockey programs in 2014. Ritter Arena remained open despite the move of the varsity hockey programs to the new center.

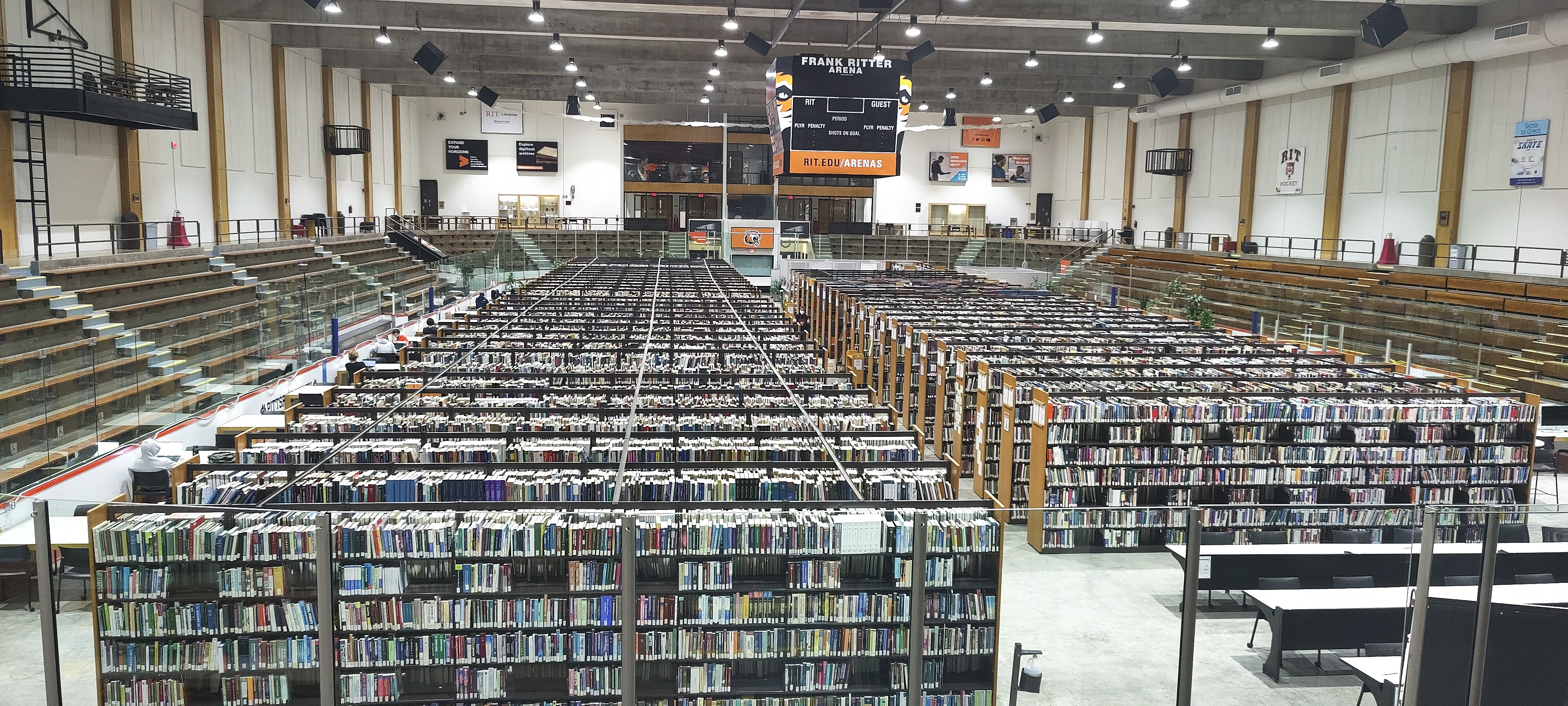
The Ritter Arena serving as the temporary home of the Wallace Library in 2021

In 2021, The Ritter became the temporary home of RIT Libraries while major renovations began on the Wallace Library building. These renovations were included as part of construction of the new Student Hall for Exploration and Development ("SHED") building attached to the library, which lasted throughout the 2021–22 and 2022–23 academic years. The library contents were moved back into the Wallace building for its re-opening at the start of the Fall 2023 semester. After the arena was vacated, plans were announced to convert the facility to an indoor turf field.

Sporting positions
Preceded by Inaugural; Murray Athletic Center; Wessman Arena	Host of the Division III men's Frozen Four; 1984; 1989; 2001	Succeeded by Achilles Rink; K.B. Willett Arena; Kenyon Arena
