= Penn State Ice Pavilion =

Former collegiate ice hockey arena

Coordinates: 40.80430°N 77.8554°W

- Interactive map of Penn State Ice Pavilion
- Location: University Park, Pennsylvania,
- Owner: Pennsylvania State University
- Operator: Intercollegiate Athletics' Recreational Services
- Capacity: 1,350 (hockey)
- Surface: 200' x 85'

Construction
- Opened: 1980

Tenants
- Nittany Lion Men's Ice Hockey (1980-2013); Nittany Lion Women's Ice Hockey (1996-2013)

The Penn State Ice Pavilion was a 1,350-seat ice arena on the campus of The Pennsylvania State University located in University Park, Pennsylvania. The ice arena included an NHL regulation sized 200' x 85' ice sheet as well as a 45' x 55' studio ice sheet.

The Ice Pavilion, also known as Greenberg, has since been converted into two distinct spaces. Greenberg building, which is located where the full size rink used to be, is a two-story transitional laboratory facility designed to house research activities while facilities are built and/or renovated. Morgan Academic Center, located where the previous studio rink and common area used to be, was opened in June 2016. It has approximately 32,000 square feet of academic support space for use of over 800 student-athletes across 31 teams.

Before Pegula Ice Arena opened in 2013, the Ice Pavilion was home to the Penn State Nittany Lions men's and women's ice hockey teams, also known as the Icers. Through the 2011–12 season, the men's team competed at the ACHA Division I level in the Eastern States Collegiate Hockey League, while the women's team competed at ACHA Women's Division I level in the Eastern Collegiate Women's Hockey League. Beginning in 2012–13, both teams upgraded to full varsity status, respectively competing as an NCAA Division I independent and a member of College Hockey America. For 2013–14, the same season that Pegula Ice Arena opened, the men's team joined the new ice hockey league sponsored by the school's all-sports conference, the Big Ten.

PSU also fields a second men's team at the ACHA Division II level in the Mid-Atlantic Collegiate Hockey Association. Penn State Figure Skating Club, local adult, high school and youth hockey, figure skating, broomball Penn State University Physical Education classes, and public skating have all now moved to the new facility.

== New arena ==
Reports associated with the men's and women's ice hockey teams moving to the NCAA Division I level also included plans for the university to construct an $80 million 5,000-6,000 seat ice arena for the teams. Plans included the Division I teams playing in the current Ice Pavilion for a season until the new (then-unnamed) arena was completed. The new building is adjacent to the Bryce Jordan Center, used for Nittany Lions and Lady Lions basketball. The new arena opened for the 2013–14 season.
