= Wentzville Ice Arena =

Arena and recreational sport facility located in Wentzville, Missouri

Coordinates: 38.820309°N 90.851623°W

- WIA
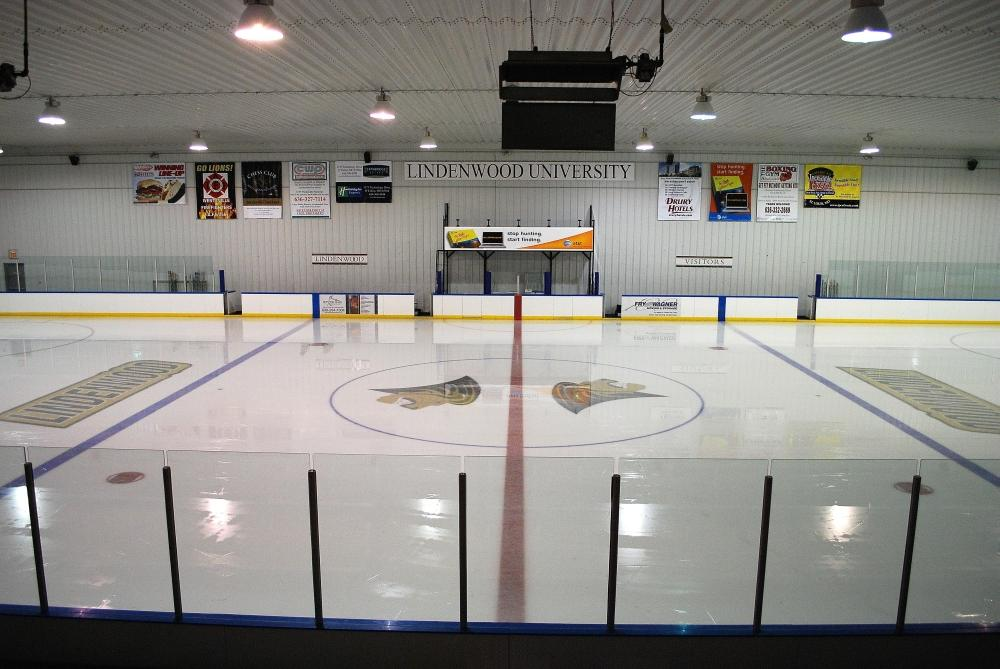
- Interactive map of Wentzville Ice Arena
- Former names: Wentzville Ice Arena (1998–2003); CenturyTel Ice Arena (2003–2004); Lindenwood Ice Arena (2004–2019)
- Location: Wentzville, Missouri
- Owner: City of Wentzville Parks & Recreation
- Operator: City of Wentzville Parks & Recreation
- Capacity: 750 (ice hockey)
- Surface: 85' × 200' (ice hockey)

Construction
- Groundbreaking: 1998
- Opened: December 1998
- Cost: $4.5 million

Tenants
- Wentzville Indians (1998–present); Lindenwood Lions (2004–2019); Lindenwood Lady Lions (2004–2019)

Wentzville Ice Arena is an arena and recreational sport facility located in Wentzville, Missouri and owned and operated by the City of Wentzville Parks & Recreation Department. It served as the home for LU Lindenwood Lions Men's and Women's ice hockey teams and LU synchronized skating team until relocating to the newly built Centene Community Ice Center.

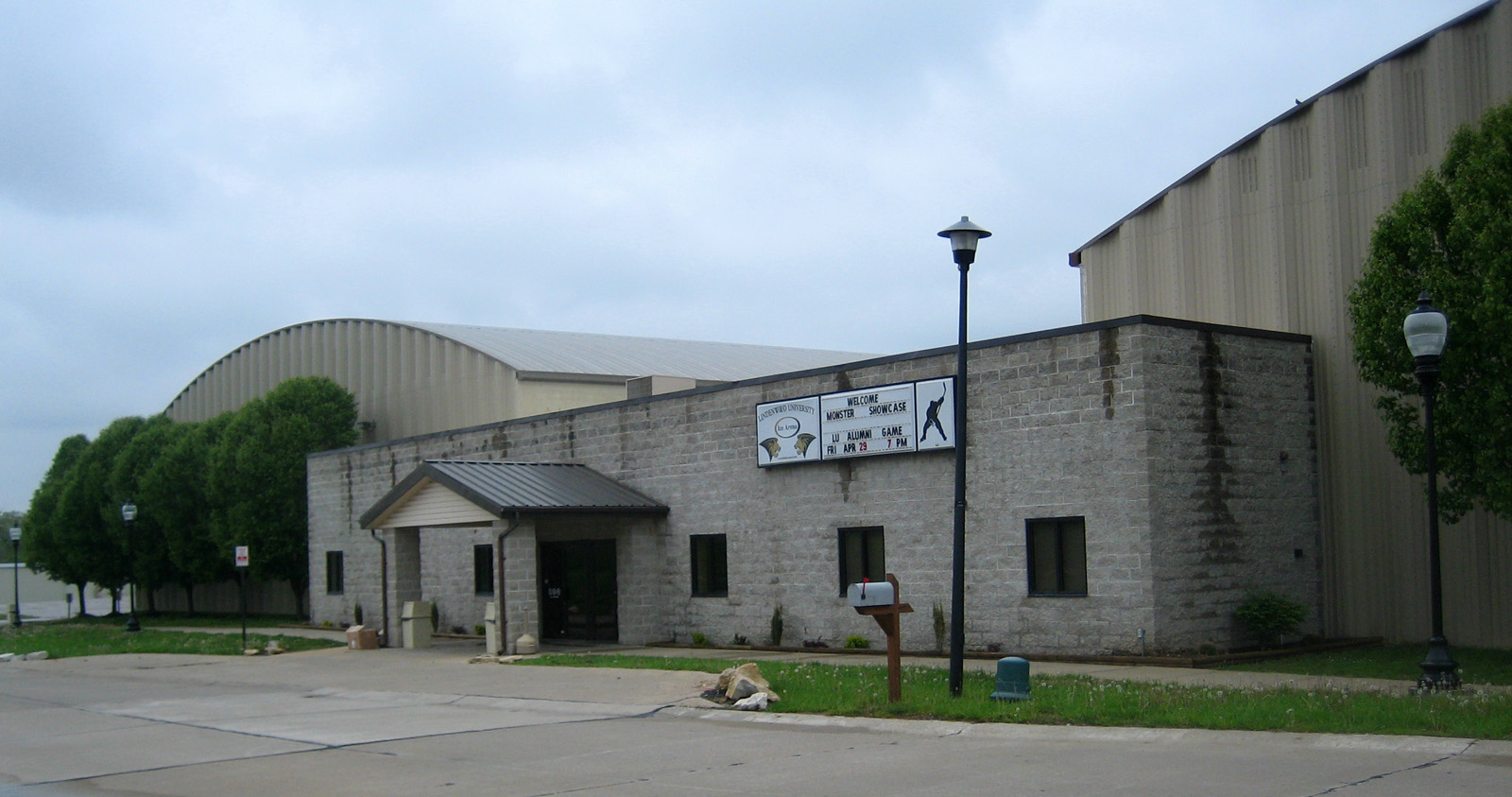
Wentzville Ice Arena

It features two NHL-size sheets of ice for ice hockey, figure skating and open skating, and local high school hockey. Other features of the arena include eight locker rooms, heated bleacher seating, and concession stand. Current capacity for spectators is about 750 for each of the two NHL-size hockey rinks.

== History ==
The Wentzville Ice Arena was built in 1998 as the Wentzville Ice Arena. The facility was developed, and originally owned, by Wayne Stumpf. The 67,800-square-foot (6,300 m^{2}) complex was constructed at a cost of $4.5 million. The Wentzville Ice Arena first opened its doors to the public on December 18, 1998. Naming rights were later sold, and the arena became known as the CenturyTel Ice Arena. The arena was sold to Lindenwood University in July 2004.

The ice arena received renovations during the summer of 2010 to prepare for the transition of the university's athletic department to the NCAA. The renovation included new in-ice logos, new boards, and major updates to the women's locker room that includes a new video room and new workout room for the team's move to NCAA Division I. Also the university constructed a new men's ACHA DII/JV locker room. It commonly is host to youth ice hockey tournaments.

In April 2018, Lindenwood University notified the City of Wentzville of plans to relocate its hockey programs to a newly constructed facility in Maryland Heights, which would be less than six miles from the Lindendwood campus as opposed to the 20 mile distance between campus and the arena in Wentzville. The university planned to put the facility up for sale and expressed a strong preference to seeing it remain as an operational arena in the City. After conducting due diligence, the City of Wentzville purchased the facility in June 2019 at a sale price of $2 million. Lindenwood agreed to finance the purchase, interest free, for a period of 20 years. The City restored the facility's original name as the Wentzville Ice Arena. Lindenwood's teams moved to the new Centene Community Ice Center in fall 2019.
