= 2011–12 CHA women's ice hockey season =

NCAA Division I women's ice hockey conference season

2011–12 College Hockey America women's ice hockey season
- League: NCAA Division I
- Sport: Ice hockey
- Duration: September 2010 through March 2011
- Teams: 4

Regular Season
- Regular Season Champs: Mercyhurst Lakers
- Season MVP: Kelley Steadman
- Top scorer: Kelley Steadman (23 pts)

2012 CHA Tournament
- Champions: Robert Morris Colonials
- Runners-up: Mercyhurst Lakers
- Finals MVP: Kristen DiCiocco

Ice hockey seasons
- ← 10–11 12–13 →

The 2011–12 College Hockey America women's ice hockey season marked the continuation of the annual tradition of competitive ice hockey among College Hockey America members.

== Offseason ==
- May 27: CHA member Wayne State University announced that sponsorship of the women's ice hockey program had been dissolved. The decision was attributed due to continuing reductions in the state of Michigan appropriations for higher education. The Wayne State Warriors recorded an all-time CHA mark of 48-59-7 (.452) in nine seasons, tying for the CHA regular-season title in 2007–08.
- June 13: Mercyhurst Lakers assistant coach Paul Colontino left the club to become head coach of the Robert Morris Colonials. He is the third head coach in Colonials history, after the resignation of Nate Handrahan, who left to assume the head coaching position at Ohio State.
- September 6: Robert DeGregorio, Commissioner for College Hockey America (CHA), announced that the Penn State Nittany Lions had been accepted into the CHA. The Nittany Lions will officially join the conference starting with the 2012–13 season.

=== Wayne State transfers ===
Player	Position	New team
Gina Buquet	Forward	Mercyhurst Lakers
Cari Coen	Forward/Defense	St. Cloud State Huskies
Jill Szandzik	Defense	Mercyhurst Lakers

== Exhibition ==
=== CIS ===
Date	CHA team	Opponent	Location	Time	Score	Lakers scorers
9/17/2011	Mercyhurst	Wilfrid Laurier University (Exhibition)	Erie, Pa.	4 p.m.	10-2	Bailey Bram (3), Kristine Grenier (3), Shelby Bram, Christine Bestland, Gina Buquet, Candice Styles

- September 17, 2011: Senior Bailey Bram registered a hat trick to go with her three assists, as the Lakers trounced the Wilfried Laurier Golden Hawks by a 10-2 tally. Her sister, Shelby Bram scored one goal while freshman Kristine Grenier also registered a hat trick in the match. Kelley Steadman contributed with four assists.

=== PWHL ===
Date	CHA team	Opponent	Location	Time	Score	Lakers scorers
9/24/2011	Mercyhurst	Stoney Creek Jr. Sabres	Erie, Pa.	4 p.m.	6-0	Kelley Steadman, Christine Bestland, Christie Cicero, Jess Jones, Caroline Luczak, Kristine Grenier
9/25/2011	Mercyhurst	Toronto Jr. Aeros	Erie, Pa.	12 p.m.	5-1	Caroline Luczak, Shelby Bram, Christine Bestland, Kelley Steadman, Christie Cicero

- September 24, 2011: Sophomore Christine Bestland notched five points as the Lakers defeated the Stoney Creek Jr. Sabres of the PWHL by a 6-0 score. The Lakers scored four goals within a five and a half minute time span late in the second period.
- September 25, 2011: Freshman Caroline Luczak notched a goal, while registering three assists as the Lakers defeated the Toronto Jr. Aeros of the PWHL.

== Regular season ==
=== News and notes ===
==== September ====
- September 14: The Lindenwood Lady Lions ice hockey program officially submitted an application to join College Hockey America (CHA) for the 2012–2013 season.
- In the Mercyhurst Lakers season opener on September 30, 2011, Bestland was named the game's First Star in a 4-0 shutout over the nationally ranked Quinnipiac Bobcats. Bailey Bram scored the game-winning goal (it was the 61st goal of her career). Goaltender Hillary Pattenden earned her 13th career shutout (and 81st career win) while Bailey Bram scored the game-winning goal.

==== October ====
- October 1, 2011: Bailey Bram played in her 100th career game for the Mercyhurst Lakers. Bram would be held pointless as the Lakers would lose the game by a 1-0 tally to the Quinnipiac Bobcats. It was Quinnipiac's first victory over Mercyhurst in twelve regular season matches.
- October 7–8: Robert Morris freshman Katie Fergus accumulated three points in her NCAA debut with one goal and two assists. Against the Lindenwood Lions, she got her first-collegiate point fewer than nine minutes into the opening period. Later in the game, she scored her first goal as the Colonials were on the penalty kill. In the second game versus Lindenwood, she earned her first multi-goal game. Fergus became one of just two freshmen in Colonials history to register multi-point performances in the first two games of a season. Fergus finished the series versus Lindenwood by scoring three goals and two assists five points. In addition, she had eight shots to complement a +5 plus/minus.
- October 8, 2011: Brianna Delaney registered the sixth three-point game of her career at Robert Morris. With the achievement, she tied the Colonials all-time record for career points. The 24th-career multi-point game of her career increased her point total to 97. The total now equals the record that Sara O'Malley set during the 2010-11 campaign.
- October 27–28: The series versus the Lindenwood Lady Lions ice hockey program marked the first time that Lindenwood hosted an NCAA Division I opponent in their home arena. Mercyhurst would win the October 28 match by a 7-0 tally, in which Lakers freshman Shelby Bram would score her first career NCAA goal. The October 29 contest saw Mercyhurst emerge as the victor in a 14-0 wash. Kelley Steadman would score four goals and notch an assist, while Jess Jones would earn a hat trick. The Bram sisters (Shelby and Bailey) each earned two goals.

==== December ====
- December 9: In a 4-2 loss to the Boston College Eagles on December 9, 2011, Kelley Steadman scored her 100th career point. The point was a goal in the second period on Boston College goalkeeper Corrine Boyles.
- December 10: In a 3-2 overtime victory versus Boston College, Hillary Pattenden made a career high 48 saves to earn the 91st victory of her NCAA career, tying former Wisconsin goaltender Jessie Vetter for the NCAA Division I record. Jill Szandzik scored at 3:01 into overtime for her second goal of the season. Bailey Bram had three assists, including one on the game-winner to give her 40 points in 16 games. Christine Bestland also earned three points. Pattenden's 48 saves broke her previous high of 38 (made earlier in the 2011-12 season) at Minnesota State-Mankato.
- December 14: In a 9-0 defeat of the Lindenwood Lady Lions, Hillary Pattenden broke Jessie Vetter's record for career NCAA wins, by notching her 92nd career victory. Forward Bailey Bram scored two goals and added four assists while Kelley Steadman scored the game-winning goal.

==== January ====
- On Friday, January 20, 2012, Brianna Delaney scored in the third period of a 4-2 loss to CHA rival Mercyhurst. After being hooked, she scored on a wrist shot top shelf as she was falling to the ice. With the score, Delaney reached several milestones; she became just the second Robert Morris player to reach the 50 goal plateau, as her 20th point of the season it made her the first player in school history to post four 20 point seasons, and it also marked the 113th point of her career, the most by any Robert Morris women's hockey player in school history.
- January 31: Rebecca Vint logged an assist in the third period at Princeton to tie the Colonials' single-season points mark.

==== February ====
- February 3–4: In a sweep over CHA opponent Syracuse, Rebecca Vint led all Colonials skaters in points. In the first game, she scored the game-winning goal to break the Colonials' single-season record for points in one season. In the 4-3 win versus the Orange, it was Vint's fourth game-winning goal of the season (a Colonials record). The following day, Vint tied the Colonials' single-season mark for goals in a 5-2 triumph. In addition, she assisted on the game-winning goal to notch her 10th multi-point effort of the season.
- February 10: Rebecca Vint notched her fifth game-winning goal of the season, a new Colonials record. In addition, said goal also broke the school record for overall goals in a season. In the third period, she logged another goal to register her sixth multi-goal game of the campaign. The following day, Vint assisting on both RMU goals to break the single-season assist record. With the two assists, she also became the first Colonial to notch 40 points in a season. Her five game-winning goals leads all skaters in the CHA.
- February 18: In a contest versus the Robert Morris Colonials, Hillary Pattenden competed in the final regular season game of her NCAA career. Heading into the game, she had 99 career regular season victories, and was aiming to be the first NCAA women's goaltender with 100 career wins. With a 4-3 Mercyhurst lead late in the third period, Colonials skater Dayna Newsom recorded a game-tying goal, as both teams skated to a 4-4 final score.

=== Standings ===
2011–12 College Hockey America standings
	Conference							Overall					
	GP	PTS	W	L	T	GF	GA	GP	W	L	T	GF	GA
#6 Mercyhurst†	6	9	4	1	1	24	16	24	18	5	1	118	47
Robert Morris*	6	7	3	2	1	9	9	24	14	8	2	73	44
Niagara	6	5	2	3	1	12	14	27	9	12	6	64	72
Syracuse	6	3	0	3	3	11	17	28	9	16	3	63	89
Wayne State	0	0	0	0	0	0	0	0	0	0	0	0	0
Championship: Robert Morris † indicates conference regular season champion * indicates conference tournament champion National rankings: Conference rankings: Updated February 2nd, 2012

- Rankings based on number of points in the conference
- Wayne State was scheduled to play in the 2011–12 season but the women's ice hockey program was dropped

=== In-season honors ===
==== CHA Weekly Honors ====
Week	Player of the week	Defensive Player of the Week	Rookie of the Week
October 3	Jenna Hendrikx, Niagara	Hillary Pattenden, Mercyhurst	Delaney Middlebrook, Niagara
October 10	Christine Bestland, Mercyhurst	Kallie Billadeau, Syracuse	Katie Fergus, Robert Morris
October 17	Bailey Bram, Mercyhurst	Hillary Pattenden, Mercyhurst	Rebecca Vint, Robert Morris
October 24	Rebecca Vint, Robert Morris	Abby Ryplanski, Niagara	Allie LaCombe, Syracuse
October 31	Bailey Bram, Mercyhurst	Kallie Billadeau, Syracuse	Shelby Bram, Mercyhurst
November 7	Erica Owczarczak, Niagara	Abby Ryplanski, Niagara	Kalli Funk, Niagara
November 14	Kylie St. Louis, Robert Morris; Kelsey Thomas, Robert Morris	Courtney Vinet, Robert Morris	Courtney Vinet, Robert Morris
November 21	Bailey Bram, Mercyhurst	Sarah Moses, Niagara	Molly Byrne, Mercyhurst
November 28	Christine Bestland, Mercyhurst	Kristin DiCiocco, Robert Morris	Shelby Bram, Mercyhurst
December 5	Jess Jones, Mercyhurst	Hillary Pattenden, Mercyhurst	Nicole Ferrara, Syracuse
December 12	Kelley Steadman, Mercyhurst	Kristin DiCiocco, Robert Morris	Rebecca Vint, Robert Morris
December 19	Bailey Bram, Mercyhurst	Hillary Pattenden, Mercyhurst	Vaila Higson, Mercyhurst
January 2	Rebecca Vint, Robert Morrs	Kristen DiCiocco, Robert Morrs	Rebecca Vint, Robert Morrs
January 9	Christine Bestland, Mercyhurst	Kristen DiCiocco, Robert Morris	Harrison Browne, Mercyhurst
January 16	Jess Jones, Mercyhurst	Amanda Makela, Mercyhurst	Kelsey Gunn, Niagara
January 23	Kelley Steadman, Mercyhurst	Sarah Moses, Niagara	Kayla Raniwsky, Niagara
January 30	Margot Scharfe, Syracuse	Kallie Billadeau, Syracuse	Nicole Ferrara, Syracuse; Kalli Funk, Niagara
February 6	Bailey Bram, Mercyhurst	Hillary Pattenden, Mercyhurst	Rebecca Vint, Robert Morris
February 13	Thea Imbrogno, Robert Morris	Kristen DiCiocco, Robert Morris	Rebecca Vint, Robert Morris
February 20	Jill Szandzik, Mercyhurst	Hillary Pattenden, Mercyhurst	Kristine Grenier, Mercyhurst Rebecca Vint, Robert Morris
February 27	Margot Scharfe, Syracuse	Jenesica Drinkwater, Syracuse	Kayla Raniwsky, Niagara
March 5	Kristen DiCiocco, Robert Morris	Kristen DiCiocco, Robert Morris	Shiann Darkangelo, Syracuse

=== Monthly awards ===
Month	Player of the Month	Defensive Player of the Month	Rookie of the Month
October 2011	Bailey Bram, Mercyhurst	Hillary Pattenden, Mercyhurst	Rebecca Vint, Robert Morris
November 2011	Bailey Bram, Mercyhurst	Hillary Pattenden, Mercyhurst	Shelby Bram, Mercyhurst
December 2011			
January 2012			
February 2012			

== Postseason ==
=== 2012 CHA Women's Ice Hockey Tournament ===
2012 CHA All-Tournament Team

- Tournament MVP: Kristen DiCiocco, G, Robert Morris
- Kathryn Stack, D, Robert Morris
- Pamela Zgoda, D, Mercyhurst
- Christine Bestland, F, Mercyhurst
- Shiann Darkangelo, F, Syracuse
- Brianna Delaney, F, Robert Morris

== Seasonal awards ==
- Player of the Year: Kelley Steadman, F, Sr., Mercyhurst
- Rookie of the Year: Rebecca Vint, F, Fr., Robert Morris
- Scoring Champion: Kelley Steadman, F, Sr., Mercyhurst (15-8-23)
- Goaltending Champion: Kristen DiCiocco, G, Jr., Robert Morris
- Coach of the Year: Paul Colontino, Robert Morris

CHA All-Conference First Team

- Bailey Bram, F, Sr., Mercyhurst
- Kelly Steadman, F, Sr., Mercyhurst
- Christine Bestland, F, So., Mercyhurst
- Rebecca Vint, F, Fr., Robert Morris
- Jill Szandzik, D, Sr., Mercyhurst
- Molly Bryne, D, Fr., Mercyhurst
- Erica Owczarczak, D, Sr., Niagara
- Kirsten DiCiocco, G, Jr., Robert Morris

CHA All-Conference Second Team

- Jess Jones, F, Sr., Mercyhurst
- Thea Imbrogno, F, So., Robert Morris
- Margot Scharfe, F, So., Syracuse
- Kelsey Gunn, D, Fr., Niagara
- Caitlin Roach, D, So., Syracuse
- Sarah Moses, G, So., Niagara

CHA All-Rookie Team

- Rebecca Vint, F, Fr., Robert Morris
- Nicole Ferrara, F, Fr., Syracuse
- Kayla Raniwsky, F, Fr., Niagara
- Molly Bryne, D, Fr., Mercyhurst
- Kaillie Goodnough, D, Fr., Syracuse
- Abby Ryplanskii, G, Fr. Niagara

== See also ==
- National Collegiate Women's Ice Hockey Championship
- 2010–11 CHA women's ice hockey season
- 2011–12 WCHA women's ice hockey season
- 2011–12 ECAC women's ice hockey season
- 2011–12 Hockey East women's ice hockey season
