= Kelley Steadman =

American ice hockey player and coach (born 1990)

- Born: July 17, 1990 (age 36) Plattsburgh, New York, United States
- Height: 5 ft 11 in (180 cm)
- Weight: 173 lb (78 kg; 12 st 5 lb)
- Position: Forward
- Shot: Right
- Played for: Buffalo Beauts; Tornado Dmitrov; Boston Blades; Mercyhurst Lakers
- Coached for: Robert Morris Colonials; Mercyhurst Lakers
- National team: United States
- Playing career: 2009–2017
- Coaching career: 2014–present
Medal record
World Championship
Gold medal – first place	2011 Switzerland
Gold medal – first place	2013 Canada

Kelley Steadman (born July 17, 1990) is an American retired ice hockey player, currently serving as an ice hockey development ambassador for Lightning Made, the community hockey department of the Tampa Bay Lightning. As a member of the United States' women's national team, she won two IIHF World Women's Championship gold medals, in 2011 and 2013. She played with the Boston Blades of the Canadian Women's Hockey League (CWHL), Tornado Dmitrov of the Russian Women's Hockey League (RWHL; replaced by ZhHL in 2015), and the Buffalo Beauts of the National Women's Hockey League (NWHL; renamed PHF in 2021).

== Playing career ==
Steadman attended secondary school at Northwood School in Lake Placid, New York. Steadman was a four-sport athlete at Northwood, participating in ice hockey, soccer, lacrosse, and crew. The ice hockey team also featured her future Team USA U18 teammate Blake Bolden. As a senior on the ice hockey team, she served as an alternate captain and registered 34 points (19 goals + 15 assists).

=== NCAA ===
Steadman played the entirety of her college ice hockey career, 2008–2012, with the Mercyhurst Lakers women's ice hockey program. In the 2008–09, her freshman season with the Lakers, Steadman appeared in all 37 games and tallied 22 points (13+9), finishing the season with a +14 plus/minus rating. She scored her first collegiate goal on October 11, 2008, against the Boston University Terriers. During her rookie campaign she posted two two-goal games, first on November 1 in a 4–3 overtime win against Colgate and, three weeks later, on November 22, against the Brown Bears. In her first three postseason games, she scored one goal in each match, including in the 2009 CHA Tournament Final versus Wayne State (March 7) where she contributed two points (1+1) to the Lakers’ CHL Championship victory. On March 14, Steadman scored the Lakers’ first goal in the 2009 NCAA Tournament, in the quarterfinal game versus No. 7 St. Lawrence.

In 2009–10, her sophomore season, she appeared in all 36 games with the Lakers and scored 28 points (15+13), ranking sixth on the team in scoring. In the first game of the regular season (October 2), Steadman scored a goal as the Lakers trounced Bemidji State, 4–1. In a two-game sweep of Rensselaer (October 16–17), Steadman scored in back to back games, including the game-winning goal in the first contest. On November 7, her two goals against Wayne State marked the beginning of a season-high six-game point streak. Steadman had a season-high four points with a hat trick and an assist in an 8–0 win over Wayne State on February 19, 2010. Of her fifteen goals, three were scored on the power play and two were short-handed. Her five game-winning goals tied for second on the team.

The 2010–11 season saw Steadman continue to build on her solid sophomore performance. She appeared in 33 games, scoring 17 goals and earning 29 points, career-highs to that point. Steadman started the season on a five-game point streak, with a highlight two-goal game at Maine on October 10. She had a second two-goal game on December 4 against the Niagara Purple Eagles, adding to an eventual 7–2 victory. In the 2011 CHA Playoff Tournament, she scored a goal in the semifinals against Robert Morris, helping the Lakers claim a 3–1 victory and progress to the finals, in which they beat the Syracuse Orange and claimed the second conference championship since Steadman joined the program. Steadman rounded out the season with a selection to the United States women's national ice hockey team for the 2011 IIHF Women's World Championship in April 2011.

In the October 29, 2011 match versus Lindenwood, Steadman scored four goals and notched an assist, as the Lakers defeated the Lions by a 14–0 mark.

As of 2018, several of Steadman's senior campaign (2011–12) totals remained in the Lakers’ individual season top-ten record book. She sits at fifth for goals in a season, with 33, and goals per game, at 0.97, tied at sixth with Bailey Bram for power-play goals in a season, with 12, and four-way tied at sixth for short-handed goals in a season, with 4. A number of her career scoring totals as a Laker are also top-ten, including her 7 career short-handed goals, which place her at fifth in program history, 78 all-time career goals and 0.56 goals per game over 140 games, which both place at sixth, and 19 power play goals, which ties with Jenna Dingeldin for ninth. She is also tied at ninth with Cassea Schols for both most career penalties drawn, with 81, and most penalty minutes, with 162.

=== NWHL ===
Steadman played with the Buffalo Beauts of the NWHL for the 2015–16 and 2016–17 seasons, originally signing as a practice player because her full-time job as Director of Hockey Operations with the Robert Morris Colonials significantly limited her ability to travel with the team. Ultimately able to play in just 18 regular season games during her time with the Beauts, her performance earned her the first NWHL contract offered to a practice player, a one-year commitment worth $15,000 which she signed for the 2016–17 season. Despite her low game count, Steadman made it into the record books more than once and was a fan favorite. She scored the first regular season goal in Buffalo Beauts franchise history on the league's opening day, October 11, 2015, slipping one past Boston Pride goaltender Brittany Ott.

Steadman was named the NWHL Player of the Week for the weeks of November 22, 2015 and January 31, 2016. Selected to the 1st NWHL All-Star Game, she won shooting accuracy, scored the first All-Star Game goal in NWHL history, and was named MVP of the 1st NWHL All-Star Game, scoring two goals and helping her team to a 9–1 victory. Her sweater from the game is displayed at the Hockey Hall of Fame. Steadman was named one of the two captains for the 2nd NWHL All-Star Game.

== International play ==
Medal record

Representing United States

Women's ice hockey

World Championship
Gold medal – first place	2011 Switzerland	
Gold medal – first place	2013 Canada	

World U18 Championship
Gold medal – first place	2008 Canada	

Steadman played with Team USA under-18 squad at the 2008 IIHF World Women's U18 Championship. She joined a roster filled with other future hockey stars, including Megan Bozek, Kendall Coyne Schofield, Brianna Decker, Amanda Kessel, Madison Packer, and her high school teammate, Blake Bolden. Steadman played in all five games and notched five assists, ending the tournament with a +10 rating. Team USA won the final against Team Canada to complete a sweep of the tournament and claim the gold medal.

On January 28, 2011, it was announced that Steadman was named to the preliminary roster for the U.S. women's national team and she was one of 30 players who took part in a Team USA selection/training camp during April 4–12, 2011. She was named to the final roster that participated at the 2011 IIHF Women's World Championship, the first player from Mercyhurst College to be selected to the US Women's National Team.

== Personal life ==
Born on July 17, 1990, in Plattsburgh, New York, she is the third and youngest child of Robert and Nancy Steadman.

She holds a bachelor's degree in elementary education from Mercyhurst University and a master's degree in instructional leadership from Robert Morris University.

Steadman met and started dating Sara Wemlinger, a physician, during her time coaching at Mercyhurst. The two married on Florida's Anna Maria Island in April 2021.

== Career statistics ==
=== Regular season and playoffs ===
			Regular season					Playoffs
Season	Team	League	GP	G	A	Pts	PIM	GP	G	A	Pts	PIM
2008–09	Mercyhurst Lakers	NCAA	37	13	9	22	46	—	—	—	—	—
2009–10	Mercyhurst Lakers	NCAA	38	15	13	28	54	—	—	—	—	—
2010–11	Mercyhurst Lakers	NCAA	33	17	12	29	26	—	—	—	—	—
2011–12	Mercyhurst Lakers	NCAA	34	33	20	53	46	—	—	—	—	—
2012–13	Boston Blades	CWHL	24	8	6	14	32	4	3	0	3	4
2013–14	Tornado Dmitrov	RWHL	16	23	15	38	24	—	—	—	—	—
2015–16	Buffalo Beauts	NWHL	10	13	7	20	16	4	2	1	3	4
2016–17	Buffalo Beauts	NWHL	8	5	5	10	16	2	0	0	0	0
NCAA totals			140	78	54	132	172	—	—	—	—	—
NWHL totals			18	18	12	30	32	6	2	1	3	4

Sources: USCHO, Elite Prospects

=== International ===
Year	Team	Event	Result	GP	G	A	Pts	PIM
2008	United States	WW18	1st place, gold medalist(s)	5	0	5	5	2
2011	United States	WW	1st place, gold medalist(s)	5	0	2	2	0
2013	United States	WW	1st place, gold medalist(s)	4	0	0	0	2
Junior totals				5	0	5	5	2
Senior totals				9	0	2	2	2

== Awards and achievements ==
Award/Achievement	Year	ref
National Women's Hockey League
Buffalo Beauts franchise first regular season goal	October 11, 2015	
NWHL All-Star	2016	
NWHL All-Star	2017	
NWHL All-Star Game first goal scored	January 24, 2016	
NWHL All-Star Game Most Valuable Player	2016	
NWHL All-Star Game Most Valuable Player	2017	
NWHL All-Star Shooting Accuracy Challenge winner	2016	
NWHL All-Star Shooting Accuracy Challenge winner	2017	
NWHL All-Star Team Captain	2017	
NWHL Player of the Week	November 22, 2015	
NWHL Player of the Week	February 2, 2016	
Russian Women's Hockey League
Russian Champion	2013–14	
IIHF European Women's Champions Cup
EWCC Champion	2013–14	
EWCC Best Forward Selected by the Directorate	2013–14	
EWCC Top Scorer, Finals	2013–14	
Canadian Women's Hockey League
Clarkson Cup champion	2013	
NCAA Division I
NCAA Annual Individual Champion, Goals per Game	2011–12 (0.97 goals per game)	
NCAA Annual Individual Champion, Power-Play Goals	2011–12 (12 goals) (Note: Tied with Brooke Ammerman (Wisconsin), Bailey Bram (Mercyhurst), and Natalie Spooner (Ohio State).)	
NCAA Annual Individual Champion, Shorthanded Goals	2011–12 (4 goals) (Note: Tied with Hilary Knight (Wisconsin) and Casey Pickett (Northeastern).)	
College Hockey America
CHA All-Star – First Team	2011–12	
CHA Player of the Year	2011–12	
CHA Scoring Champion	2011–12	
CHA Player of the Week	December 12, 2011	
Mercyhurst Lakers
Athlete of the Week	February 23, 2010	
Athlete of the Week	January 16, 2012	
