= 2011–12 Wayne State Warriors women's ice hockey season =

- Conference: CHA

Rankings
- USA Today/USA Hockey Magazine: Not ranked
- USCHO.com/CBS College Sports: Not ranked

Record

Coaches and captains
- Head coach: Jim Fetter
- Captain: Alyssa Baldin
- Alternate captain(s): Ciara Lee, Veronique Laramee-Paquette, Gina Buquet

Wayne State was to begin its 13th season of women’s ice hockey on September 30, 2011. In its twelve existing seasons, the Warriors compiled a won-loss record of 138-209-29 (.406 winning percentage). In College Hockey America conference play, the program accumulated an all-time CHA mark of 48-59-7 (.452) in nine seasons. In 2007-08, Wayne State tied for the CHA regular-season title in 2007-08. Senior forward Alyssa Baldin was to serve as captain for the second consecutive year. Of note, Baldin was the Warriors active scoring leader (while ranking seventh all-time in career points). Wayne State was the only Division I women’s program in Michigan.

== Offseason ==
- May 11: Wayne State University head women’s hockey coach Jim Fetter announced the team captains for the upcoming season. Senior forward Alyssa Baldin was to serve as captain for the second consecutive year. Of note, Baldin was the Warriors active scoring leader (while ranking seventh all-time in career points). Senior Ciara Lee, senior forward Veronique Laramee-Paquette and junior forward Gina Buquet were named assistant captains.
- May 27: Wayne State University discontinued its women’s ice hockey program. School officials declared the decision was necessary as a result of continuing reductions in the state of Michigan appropriations towards higher education.

== Transfers ==
Player	Position	New team
Alyssa Baldin	Forward	Windsor Lancers (CIS)
Delayne Brian	Goaltender	Robert Morris Colonials
Gina Buquet	Forward	Mercyhurst Lakers
Cari Coen	Forward/Defense	St. Cloud State Huskies
Veronique Laramee-Paquette	Left wing	Concordia Stingers (CIS)
Jill Szandzik	Defense	Mercyhurst Lakers

== Regular season ==
=== Standings ===
2011–12 College Hockey America standings
	Conference							Overall					
	GP	PTS	W	L	T	GF	GA	GP	W	L	T	GF	GA
#6 Mercyhurst†	6	9	4	1	1	24	16	24	18	5	1	118	47
Robert Morris*	6	7	3	2	1	9	9	24	14	8	2	73	44
Niagara	6	5	2	3	1	12	14	27	9	12	6	64	72
Syracuse	6	3	0	3	3	11	17	28	9	16	3	63	89
Wayne State	0	0	0	0	0	0	0	0	0	0	0	0	0
Championship: Robert Morris † indicates conference regular season champion * indicates conference tournament champion National rankings: Conference rankings: Updated February 2nd, 2012

- Rankings based on number of points in the conference
- Wayne State was scheduled to play in the 2011–12 season but the women's ice hockey program was dropped

=== Schedule ===
Had the Warriors iced a team for the season, their designated schedule would have had them open the season versus WCHA team Ohio State. Their first conference game would have been versus the Mercyhurst Lakers on November 4

Date	Opponent	Location	Time
Fri. 9/30/2011	Ohio State	Detroit, Mich.	7:00 PM
Sat. 10/1/2011	Ohio State	Detroit, Mich.	2:00 PM
Fri. 10/7/2011	Minnesota State	Mankato, Minn.	7:07 PM
Sat. 10/8/2011	Minnesota State	Mankato, Minn.	2:07 PM
Fri. 10/21/2011	Cornell	Ithaca, N.Y.	2:00 PM
Sat. 10/22/2011	Cornell	Ithaca, N.Y.	2:00 PM
Fri. 10/28/2011	Lindenwood	St. Charles, Mo.	7:00 PM
Sat. 10/29/2011	Lindenwood	St. Charles, Mo.	2:00 PM
Fri. 11/4/2011	Mercyhurst	Detroit, Mich.	7:00 PM
Sat. 11/5/2011	Mercyhurst	Detroit, Mich.	2:00 PM
Fri. 11/11/2011	Robert Morris	Pittsburgh, Pa.	7:05 PM
Sat. 11/12/2011	Robert Morris	Pittsburgh, Pa.	2:05 PM
Fri. 11/18/2011	St. Cloud State	Detroit, Mich.	7:00 PM
Sat. 11/19/2011	St. Cloud State	Detroit, Mich.	2:00 PM
Fri. 12/2/2011	Lindenwood	Detroit, Mich.	7:00 PM
Sat. 12/3/2011	Lindenwood	Detroit, Mich.	2:00 PM
Fri. 1/6/2012	Niagara	Niagara University, N.Y.	7:00 PM
Sat. 1/7/2012	Niagara	Niagara University, N.Y.	2:00 PM
Fri. 1/13/2012	Syracuse	Detroit, Mich.	7:00 PM
Sat. 1/14/2012	Syracuse	Detroit, Mich.	2:00 PM
Fri. 1/20/2012	Quinnipiac	Hamden, Conn.	7:00 PM
Sat. 1/21/2012	Quinnipiac	Hamden, Conn.	1:00 PM
Fri. 1/27/2012	Mercyhurst	Erie, Pa.	7:00 PM
Sat. 1/28/2012	Mercyhurst	Erie, Pa.	2:00 PM
Fri. 2/10/2012	Niagara	Detroit, Mich.	7:00 PM
Sat. 2/11/2012	Niagara	Detroit, Mich.	2:00 PM
Fri. 2/17/2012	Syracuse	Syracuse, N.Y.	7:00 PM
Sat. 2/18/2012	Syracuse	Syracuse, N.Y.	2:00 PM
Fri. 2/24/2012	Robert Morris	Detroit, Mich.	7:00 PM
Sat. 2/25/2012	Robert Morris	Detroit, Mich.	2:00 PM
