= Alyssa Baldin =

Canadian ice hockey player

- Born: February 15, 1990 (age 36) Mississauga, Ontario, Canada
- Height: 5 ft 6 in (168 cm)
- Weight: 135 lb (61 kg; 9 st 9 lb)
- Position: Forward
- Played for: Canada women's national inline hockey team; Toronto Furies (CWHL); Windsor Lancers (OUA); Wayne State Warriors (CHA); Mississauga Jr. Chiefs (PWHL)
- Playing career: 2008–2016
Medal record
Inline World Championships
Gold medal – first place	2016 Italy

Alyssa Baldin (born February 15, 1990) is an elite women's ice hockey player who has also competed for the Canada women's national inline hockey team. With regards to Baldin's women's ice hockey career, she has competed at the university level in both the NCAA and CIS. Acquired by the Toronto Furies in the 2013 CWHL Draft, she was on the Clarkson Cup winning team in 2014.

== Playing career ==
=== Ice hockey ===
For the 2007 National Women's Under-18 Championships, she was selected to Team Ontario Blue.

==== NCAA ====
Joining the Wayne State Warriors in autumn 2008, Baldin scored her first career goal on October 18, 2008 at Union. It was also her first collegiate point. She finished 8th among CHA rookies with 18 point (seventh highest by any freshman in Warriors history).

On October 15, 2010, Baldin scored her 20th career goal in NCAA play. With the goal, she moves into a tie for ninth all-time in Wayne State Warriors women's ice hockey history. On November 13, 2010, she earned her first career hat trick as Wayne State bested Robert Morris by a 4-1 tally. The goal she scored in the second period proved to be the game-winning goal, as she became the Warrior since Melissa Boal to register a hat trick.

On May 11, 2011, she was named team captain for the Wayne State Warriors upcoming season. Of note, she was the last captain in the history of the Wayne State Warriors, as the 2011–12 Wayne State Warriors women's ice hockey season was cancelled. At the time that the Warriors program was dissolved, she was the Warriors active scoring leader (while ranking seventh all-time in career points).

==== CIS ====
Baldin joined the University of Windsor Lancers women's ice hockey program in the autumn of 2011 after Wayne State discontinued its women's ice hockey program. In her first season with the Lancers, Baldin ranked in the top 20 in Ontario University Athletics for most goals scored and the top 10 for power play goals. Heading into the 2012-13 season (her final one with Windsor), she was named the team captain.

==== CWHL ====
The Toronto Furies selected Baldin in the fifth round, 22nd overall in the 2013 CWHL Draft. She scored a goal and an assist in her CWHL debut with the Furies, a November 9, 2013 win against the Calgary Inferno, garnering First Star of the Game honors. On two separate occasions in the 2013-14 season, she tallied four-point games. She finished the season as the Furies' leading scorer among rookies in points, also tying with Carolyne Prevost for first overall in team scoring and pacing all Furies in assists with 15, respectively.

During the 2015-16 CWHL season, Baldin was named an alternate captain with the Toronto Furies. Of note, she scored the first game-winning goal of her CWHL career, and also registered her first career CWHL playoff points.

=== Inline hockey ===
Baldin made her debut for the Canadian national team at the 2016 FIRS Inline Hockey World Championship in Italy. She contributed to Canada emerging from the event with the gold medal. Baldin finished the tournament as one of Canada's five leading scorers. As a side note, Furies teammate Michelle Bonello was also part of the Canadian gold medal winning roster.

== Career stats ==
=== NCAA ===
Year	Team	GP	G	A	PTS	PIM	PPG	SHG	GWG
2008-09	Wayne State	26	9	9	18	22	4	1	3
2009-10	Wayne State	31	9	11	20	24	4	1	1
2010-11	Wayne State	31	12	7	19	13	4	0	1

=== CIS ===
- This is an incomplete list

Year	Team	GP	G	A	PTS	PIM	PPG	SHG	GWG
2011-12	Windsor	14	10	5	15	8	4	1	2
2012-13	Windsor	N/A	N/A	N/A	N/A	N/A	N/A	N/A	

=== CWHL ===
Team	GP	G	A	PTS	+/-	PIM	PPG	SHG	GWG	
2013-14	Toronto	23	8	15	23	+6	14	4	0	0
2014-15	Toronto	23	3	2	5	-10	24	0	0	0
2015-16	Toronto	22	7	11	18	-4	26	1	0	1

==== Playoffs ====
Year	Team	GP	G	A	PTS
2014	Toronto	4	0	0	0
2015	Toronto	2	0	0	0
2016	Toronto	2	1	1	2

=== FIRS Worlds ===
Year	Event	GP	G	A	PTS	PIM
2016	FIRS Inline Hockey Worlds	7	2	5	7	10

== Awards and honours ==
- 2014 Clarkson Cup
