= 2011–12 Mercyhurst Lakers women's ice hockey season =

CHA Regular Season champions Regionals, Lost, 3-1 vs. Wisconsin
- Conference: CHA
- Home ice: Agganis Arena

Record
- Overall: 22–8–3

Coaches and captains
- Head coach: Michael Sisti
- Assistant coaches: Louis Goulet; Kelly Paton; Delaney Collins
- Captain: Pamela Zgoda
- Alternate captain(s): Bailey Bram; Jess Jones; Kelley Steadman

The Mercyhurst Lakers women's hockey team represented Mercyhurst College in the 2011–12 NCAA Division I women's ice hockey season. The Lakers were coached by Michael Sisti and won the regular season College Hockey America championship. During the season, the Lakers only carried 17 skaters, but the club won its 12th consecutive regular season title. In addition, the squad qualified for the NCAA tournament for the eighth consecutive season, an NCAA Division I women's hockey record. The Lakers finished 22–8–3 overall, and were defeated by top-seed Wisconsin, 3–1, in the NCAA quarterfinals.

== Offseason ==
- June 13: Mercyhurst Lakers assistant coach Paul Colontino has left the club to become head coach of the Robert Morris Colonials. He is the third head coach in Colonials history, after the resignation of Nate Handrahan, who left to assume the head coaching position at Ohio State.
- June 16: Head coach Michael Sisti announced the captains for the upcoming season. Senior Pamela Zgoda will serve as team captain. The alternate captains include Kelley Steadman, Bailey Bram and Jess Jones.
- August 5: Former New Hampshire All-American and Patty Kazmaier Award finalist, Kelly Paton will serve as a volunteer assistant coach for the upcoming season.
- August 10: Three members of the Lakers are participating in their countries' training camps. Bailey Bram and Christine Bestland are on Canada's National Women's Under-22/Development Team roster. Kelley Steadman was invited to the 2011 USA Hockey Women's National Festival.
- August 23: Former Canadian national women's team member Delaney Collins has been hired as an assistant coach for the Mercyhurst women's team.

== Recruiting ==
| Player | Position | Nationality | Notes |
| Shelby Bram | Canada | Forward | Younger sister of Lakers player Bailey Bram |
| Hailey Browne | Canada | Forward | Represented Canada at Women's World Under 18 Championship; Represented Ontario at Canada Winter Games |
| Amanda Makela | Canada | Goaltender | Represented Ontario at Canada Winter Games |

== Exhibition ==
| Date | Opponent | Location | Time | Score | Lakers scorers |
| 9/17/2011 | Wilfrid Laurier University (Exhibition) | Erie, Pa. | 4 p.m. | 10-2 | Bailey Bram (3), Kristine Grenier (3), Shelby Bram, Christine Bestland, Gina Buquet, Candice Styles |
| 9/24/2011 | Stoney Creek (Exhibition) | Erie, Pa. | 4 p.m. | 6-0 | Kelley Steadman, Christine Bestland, Christie Cicero, Jess Jones, Caroline Luczak, Kristine Grenier |
| 9/25/2011 | Toronto Aeros (Exhibition) | Erie, Pa. | 12 p.m. | 5-1 | Caroline Luczak, Shelby Bram, Christine Bestland, Kelley Steadman, Christie Cicero |

- September 17, 2011: Senior Bailey Bram registered a hat trick to go with her three assists, as the Lakers trounced the Wilfrid Laurier Golden Hawks women's ice hockey program by a 10-2 tally. Her sister, Shelby Bram scored one goal while freshman Kristine Grenier also registered a hat trick in the match. Kelley Steadman contributed with four assists.
- September 24, 2011: Sophomore Christine Bestland notched five points as the Lakers defeated the Stoney Creek Jr. Sabres of the PWHL by a 6–0 score. The Lakers scored four goals within a five and a half minute time span late in the second period.
- September 25, 2011: Freshman Caroline Luczak notched a goal, while registering three assists as the Lakers defeated the Toronto Jr. Aeros of the PWHL.

=== CWHL Exhibition ===
| Date | Opponent | Score | Lakers goal scorers |
| Nov. 2 | Brampton Thunder (CWHL) | Brampton, 3-1 | Bailey Bram |

== Regular season ==
=== News and notes ===
- In the Lakers season opener on September 30, 2011, Bestland was named the game's First Star in a 4–0 shutout over the nationally ranked Quinnipiac Bobcats. Bailey Bram scored the game-winning goal (it was the 61st goal of her career). Goaltender Hillary Pattenden earned her 13th career shutout (and 81st career win) while Bailey Bram scored the game-winning goal.
- October 1, 2011: Bailey Bram played in her 100th career game for the Mercyhurst Lakers. Bram would be held pointless as the Lakers would lose the game by a 1–0 tally to Quinnipiac. It was Quinnipiac's first victory over Mercyhurst in twelve regular season matches.
- October 7, 2011: Freshman Kristine Grenier logs her first career NCAA goal in an overtime loss to Minnesota State.
- October 15, 2011: Bailey Bram registers a hat trick as the Lakers blanks the Providence Friars by a 5–0 tally.
- October 27–28: The series versus the Lindenwood Lady Lions ice hockey program marked the first time that Lindenwood hosted an NCAA Division I opponent in their home arena. Mercyhurst would win the October 28 match by a 7–0 tally, in which Lakers freshman Shelby Bram would score her first career NCAA goal. The October 29 contest saw Mercyhurst emerge as the victor in a 14–0 whitewash. Kelley Steadman would score four goals and notch an assist, while Jess Jones would earn a hat trick. The Bram sisters (Shelby and Bailey) each earned two goals.
- November 18–19: In a pair of victories over the Yale Bulldogs, Hillary Pattenden won two more games to give her a career total of 87. The total is four shy of career leader, Jessie Vetter of Wisconsin. In the 9–1 victory on November 18, she stopped 14 of 15 Bulldogs shots. The following day, she stopped 21 of 23 shots in a 6–2 victory. The goal she allowed on November 18 snapped a consecutive scoreless streak of 206:36. Previous to the goal, she had not allowed a goal since the third period of a 5–4 win over the MSU Mavericks (on October 8).
  - November 18–19: Bailey Bram increased her scoring pace by notching five goals to go with five assists in two victories over the Yale Bulldogs. In the 9–1 win on November 18, Bram registered two goals and logged two assists. The following day, she had a hand in all six goals (three goals and three assists) in the Lakers 6–2 win. Bram earned her fifth career hat trick and second of the season. In the two game set versus the Bulldogs, her plus minus rating was a +6, while her six-point game on November 19 was the second time in the season that she registered at least six points in a game. Her first was a career-high seven points in a win over the Lindenwood Lady Lions. Statistically, she logged 14 goals and 11 assists in the first 10 games she played of the season.
- For the week of November 20, 2011, Hillary Pattenden earned two more victories. Said victories provided her with 89 career wins for her career. With the wins, the Lakers extended their winning streak to nine contests. Pattenden became two wins shy of tying the NCAA Division I record of 91 career wins, held by Jessie Vetter of the Wisconsin Badgers. In a November 22 triumph versus the St. Lawrence Skating Saints, she stopped 16-of-19 shots. The three goals she allowed were all St. Lawrence power play goals. The following day, she stopped 31-of 32 shots.
- December 9: In a 4–2 loss to the Boston College Eagles on December 9, 2011, Kelley Steadman scored her 100th career point. The point was a goal in the second period on Boston College goaltender Corrine Boyles.
- December 10: In a 3–2 overtime victory versus Boston College, Hillary Pattenden made a career high 48 saves to earn the 91st victory of her NCAA career, tying former Wisconsin goaltender Jessie Vetter for the NCAA Division I record. Jill Szandzik scored at 3:01 into overtime for her second goal of the season. Bailey Bram had three assists, including one on the game-winner to give her 40 points in 16 games. Christine Bestland also earned three points. Pattenden's 48 saves broke her previous high of 38 (made earlier in the 2011–12 season) at Minnesota State-Mankato.
- December 14: In a 9–0 defeat of the Lindenwood Lady Lions, Hillary Pattenden broke Jessie Vetter's record for career NCAA wins, by notching her 92nd career victory. Forward Bailey Bram scored two goals and added four assists while Kelley Steadman scored the game-winning goal.
- January 6, 2012: Hailey Browne, who hails from Oakville, Ontario, stepped up this weekend, as the Lakers were looking for some offense to replace the nation's leading scorer - senior Bailey Bram. Browne had her first career multi-point and multi-goal game on Friday night. She scored her first goal of the game late in the first period, putting Mercyhurst ahead for good. She then tacked on her second goal of the game late in the second period, which also proved to be her first career game-winning goal. She went on to win her first CHA Rookie-of-the-Week award.
- February 3–4: In a series versus CHA opponent Niagara, Bailey Bram had a five-point weekend. In the first game, she logged two goals (her first goals since December 15) to contribute to a 6–1 Lakers win. In the following game (a 3–3 draw), Bram had a hand in all three goals with one goal and two helpers. It was her 10th three-point game of the season. Of note, her first period goal was her 11th power play goal of the season, giving her the NCAA lead in that category. Her 2.46 points per game average also leads the NCAA.
- In a February 18, 2012 contest versus the Robert Morris Colonials, Hillary Pattenden competed in the final regular season game of her NCAA career. Heading into the game, she had 99 career regular season victories, and was aiming to be the first NCAA women's goaltender with 100 career wins. With a 4–3 Mercyhurst lead late in the third period, Colonials skater Dayna Newsom recorded a game-tying goal, as both teams skated to a 4–4 final score.

=== Standings ===
2011–12 College Hockey America standings
| | Conference | | | | | | | Overall | | | | | |
| | GP | PTS | W | L | T | GF | GA | GP | W | L | T | GF | GA |
|---|---|---|---|---|---|---|---|---|---|---|---|---|---|
| #6 Mercyhurst† | 6 | 9 | 4 | 1 | 1 | 24 | 16 | 24 | 18 | 5 | 1 | 118 | 47 |
| Robert Morris* | 6 | 7 | 3 | 2 | 1 | 9 | 9 | 24 | 14 | 8 | 2 | 73 | 44 |
| Niagara | 6 | 5 | 2 | 3 | 1 | 12 | 14 | 27 | 9 | 12 | 6 | 64 | 72 |
| Syracuse | 6 | 3 | 0 | 3 | 3 | 11 | 17 | 28 | 9 | 16 | 3 | 63 | 89 |
| Wayne State | 0 | 0 | 0 | 0 | 0 | 0 | 0 | 0 | 0 | 0 | 0 | 0 | 0 |
Championship: Robert Morris † indicates conference regular season champion * indicates conference tournament champion National rankings: Conference rankings: Updated February 2nd, 2012

- Rankings based on number of points in the conference
- Wayne State was scheduled to play in the 2011–12 season but the women's ice hockey program was dropped

=== Schedule ===
| Date | Opponent | Location | Time | Score | Record | Lakers scorers |
| 9/30/2011 | Quinnipiac University | Erie, Pa. | 7 p.m. | 4-0 | 1-0-0 | Bailey Bram, Kelley Steadman, Christine Bestland, Lauren Jones |
| 10/1/2011 | Quinnipiac University | Erie, Pa. | 2 p.m. | 0-1 | 1-1-0 | None |
| 10/7/2011 | Minnesota State University - Mankato | Mankato, MN | 6 p.m. | 2-3 (OT) | 1-2-0 | Gina Buquet, Kristine Grenier |
| 10/8/2011 | Minnesota State University - Mankato | Mankato, MN | 1 p.m. | 5-4 | 2-2-0 | Christine Bestland (2), Bailey Bram, Lauren Jones, Kelley Steadman |
| 10/15/2011 | Providence College | Providence, RI | 1 p.m. | 5-0 | 3-2-0 | Bailey Bram (3), Christie Cicero, Kelley Steadman |
| 10/16/2011 | Providence College | Providence, RI | 1 p.m. | | | |
| 10/28/2011 | Lindenwood University | St. Charles, MO | 7 p.m. | | | |
| 10/29/2011 | Lindenwood University | St. Charles, MO | 1 p.m. | | | |
| 11/2/2011 | Brampton (Exhibition) | Erie, Pa. | 7 p.m. | | | |
| 11/18/2011 | Yale University | Erie, Pa. | 3 p.m. | | | |
| 11/19/2011 | Yale University | Erie, Pa. | 2 p.m. | | | |
| 11/22/2011 | St. Lawrence University | Erie, Pa. | 7 p.m. | | | |
| 11/23/2011 | St. Lawrence University | Erie, Pa. | 3 p.m. | | | |
| 12/2/2011 | Cornell University | Erie, Pa. | 7 p.m. | | | |
| 12/3/2011 | Cornell University | Erie, Pa. | 2 p.m. | | | |
| 12/9/2011 | Boston College | Chestnut Hill, MA | | | | |
| 12/10/2011 | Boston College | Chestnut Hill, MA | | | | |
| 12/14/2011 | Lindenwood University | Erie, Pa. | 7 p.m. | | | |
| 12/15/2011 | Lindenwood University | Erie, Pa. | 7 p.m. | | | |
| 1/6/2012 | Syracuse University | Syracuse, NY TBA | | | | |
| 1/7/2012 | Syracuse University | Syracuse, NY TBA | | | | |
| 1/13/2012 | Niagara University | Erie, Pa. | 7 p.m. | | | |
| 1/14/2012 | Niagara University | Niagara Falls, NY | 2 p.m. | | | |
| 1/20/2012 | Robert Morris University | Moon Township, Pa. | 7 p.m. | | | |
| 1/21/2012 | Robert Morris University | Erie, Pa. | 7 p.m. | | | |
| 2/3/2012 | Niagara University | Niagara Falls, NY | 7 p.m. | | | |
| 2/4/2012 | Niagara University | Erie, Pa. | 7 p.m. | | | |
| 2/7/2012 | Cornell University | Ithaca, NY | 7 p.m. | | | |
| 2/10/2012 | Syracuse University | Erie, Pa. | 3 p.m. | | | |
| 2/11/2012 | Syracuse University | Erie, Pa. | 2 p.m. | | | |
| 2/17/2012 | Robert Morris University | Erie, Pa. | 7 p.m. | | | |
| 2/18/2012 | Robert Morris University | Moon Township, Pa. | 7 p.m. | | | |

== Awards and honors ==
- Christine Bestland, CHA Player of the Week (Week of October 10, 2011)
- Christine Bestland, College Hockey America Player of the Week (Week of November 28, 2011)
- Christine Bestland, CHA Player of the Week (Week of January 9, 2012)
- Bailey Bram, CHA Player of the Week (Week of October 31, 2011)
- Bailey Bram, CHA Player of the Month (Month of October 2011)
- Bailey Bram, CHA Player of the Month (Month of November 2011)
- Bailey Bram, CHA Player of the Week (Week of November 21, 2011)
- Bailey Bram, CHA Player of the Week (Week of December 19, 2011)
- Bailey Bram, CHA Player of the Week (Week of February 6, 2012)
- Shelby Bram, CHA Rookie of the Week (Week of October 31, 2011)
- Shelby Bram, College Hockey America Rookie of the Week (Week of November 28, 2011)
- Shelby Bram, CHA Rookie of the Month (Month of November 2011)
- Hailey Browne, CHA Rookie of the Week (Week of January 9, 2012)

- Molly Byrne, CHA Rookie of the Week (Week of November 21, 2011)
- Molly Byrne, Co-CHA Rookie of the Week (Week of December 5, 2011)
- Vaila Higson, CHA Rookie of the Week (Week of December 19, 2011)
- Jess Jones, CHA Player of the Week (Week of December 5, 2011)
- Jess Jones, CHA Player of the Week (Week of January 16, 2012)
- Amanda Makela, CHA Goaltender of the Week (Week of January 16, 2012)
- Hillary Pattenden, CHA Defensive Player of the Week (Week of October 3, 2011)
- Hillary Pattenden, CHA Defensive Player of the Month (Month of October 2011)
- Hillary Pattenden, CHA Defensive Player of the Month (Month of November 2011)
- Hillary Pattenden, CHA Goaltender of the Week (Week of December 5, 2011)
- Hillary Pattenden, CHA Goaltender of the Week (Week of December 19, 2011)
- Hillary Pattenden, CHA Defensive Player of the Week (Week of February 6, 2012)
- Kelley Steadman, CHA Player of the Week (Week of December 12, 2011)
- Kelley Steadman, CHA Player of the Week (Week of January 23, 2012)

=== Statistical leaders ===
- Bailey Bram, 2012 CHA Overall Scoring Champion (66 points)
- Bailey Bram, 2012 CHA Overall Assists Leader (40 points)
- Kelley Steadman, 2012 CHA Overall Goal Scoring Champion (32 goals)
- Molly Byrne, 2012 Overall CHA leader, Defenders Scoring Champion (33 points)
- Hillary Pattenden, 2012 Overall CHA leader, Winning Percentage (.732)
- Hillary Pattenden, 2012 Overall CHA leader, Shutouts (6)

== CWHL Draft ==
- The following were selected in the 2012 CWHL Draft.

| Round | Pick | Player | Team |
| 1 | 1 | Hillary Pattenden | Alberta Honeybadgers |
| 2 | 8 | Bailey Bram | Brampton Thunder |
| 5 | 24 | Kelley Steadman | Boston Blades |
