= Delayne Brian =

Canadian ice hockey player (born 1990)

- Born: July 24, 1990 (age 36) Winnipeg, Manitoba, Canada
- Height: 5 ft 9 in (175 cm)
- Weight: 170 lb (77 kg; 12 st 2 lb)
- Position: Goaltender
- Caught: Left
- CWHL team: Calgary Inferno
- Playing career: 2008–2018
Medal record
Women's ice hockey
Representing Canada
IIHF World Women's U18 Championships
Silver medal – second place	2008 Canada	Team
ISBHF World Street Hockey Championships
Gold medal – first place	2015 Switzerland	Team

Delayne Brian (born July 24, 1990) is a Canadian former professional ice hockey goaltender. Brian helped the Inferno capture the 2016 Clarkson Cup championship, where she was recognized as Playoff MVP.

== Playing career ==
=== NCAA ===
For three seasons, Brian competed with the Wayne State Warriors women's ice hockey program. In October 2010, made 26 saves in a 3–0 victory over St. Cloud State to earn her fifth career shutout. The following day, she had 39 saves in a 1–0 loss to the Minnesota Golden Gophers. In both games, Brian had a 0.50 goals-against average and a .985 save percentage.

On October 16, 2010, Brian stopped 40 shots from Boston University. It was two shy of her single game career-high. In the two game series, she had a total of 75 saves. She would also make 71 saves in a two-game sweep at Colgate. In the 4–0 triumph, she had 31 saves while earning her second shutout of the season. It was her sixth career shutout. The following day, she registered 40 saves, as the Warriors triumphed by a 5–3 mark. In addition, she held Colgate's power-play unit scoreless in nine chances during the series. With the two wins, she moved into a tie for second all time in WSU career victories with 24.

During the month of October 2010, DeLayne Brian was the starting goalie in all eight of the Warriors games. Among the highlights, she accumulated 61 saves on Oct. 1–2 against Bemidji State. On top of her 61 saves, she held the Beavers to 1-for-13 on the power play. On October 8, she registered her fifth career shutout as she blanked St. Cloud State. Against nationally ranked Boston University, she had a career-high 75 saves in the two game series. Against the Colgate Raiders, she would earn another shutout as she notched 31 saves (on October 22). She led all CHA netminders with a .932 save percentage and ranked third in the nation during October with 272 saves.

From January 21–22, 2011, Brian made 59 saves in a series split versus # 10 ranked Quinnipiac. She stopped 28 shots in a 2–1 win, as Wayne State snapped an 18-game winless streak against ranked opponents. Brian finished with 31 saves on Saturday. For Brian, it was her 16th performance with 30-plus saves this season. Her 700 saves are fourth-most in the nation and the second-highest single-season total in program history.

Brian made 28 saves in the second period. She broke the program record for saves in a period, previously held by Kelly Zamora who had 24 at Mercyhurst on Feb. 2, 2002. Brian finished five saves short of the single-game mark set by Tina Thibideau (56 saves) at Harvard on Jan. 4, 2003.

During the 2012-13 NCAA women's ice hockey season, Brian competed for the Robert Morris Colonials women's ice hockey program, after Wayne State dissolved its women's hockey program.

=== CWHL ===
Having joined the Calgary Inferno in the autumn of 2013, taken sixth overall in the 2013 CHWL Draft, the first goaltender selected, Brian participated in the 2014 CWHL All-Star Game and the 2nd Canadian Women's Hockey League All-Star Game, which both took place at Toronto's Air Canada Centre. In 2014, she was recognized as the CWHL's Goaltender of the Year.

In the 2016 Clarkson Cup finals, Brian faced 41 shots from Les Canadiennes de Montreal as the Inferno emerged victorious in a convincing 8–3 final.

On July 16, 2018, Brian, and fellow Calgary Inferno teammates Jacquie Pierri and Brittany Esposito announced their retirements from the CWHL.

=== International play ===
Brian competed with Team Canada at the inaugural IIHF Under-18 Women's World Championships. She would capture a silver medal at the 2008 IIHF World Women's U18 Championship.

In the autumn of 2014, Brian was named as one of the goaltenders for the Canada women's national ball hockey team at the 2015 ISBHF World Street Hockey Championships in Zug, Switzerland. During Canada's 3–2 win against Team USA on June 26, Brian earned one of the assists on the game–winning goal scored by Elysia Desmier. The Canadian team captured the gold medal as Brian started in the championship game.

== Statistics ==
=== NCAA ===
Season	Team	League	GP	W	L	T	MIN	SVS	GAA
2008–09	Wayne State Warriors	NCAA	21	15	6	0	1214:04	485	2.72
2009–10	Wayne State Warriors	NCAA	19	5	10	3	1095:56	474	2.52
2010–11	Wayne State Warriors	NCAA	31	8	21	2	1856:07	978	2.72
2012–13	Robert Morris Colonials	NCAA	6	2	2	0	282:58	93	2.97
NCAA Totals			77	30	39	5	4449:07	2030	2.68

Statistics source

=== CWHL ===
Season	Team	League	GP	W	L	OTL	SO	MIN	SVS	GAA
2013-14	Calgary Inferno	CWHL	14	8	5	0	1	809:10	290	2.52
2014-15	Calgary Inferno	CWHL	17	11	4	1	1	1023:38	405	2.46
2015-16	Calgary Inferno	CWHL	20	11	5	1	2	1104:29	445	2.99
CWHL Totals			51	30	14	2	2	2936:00	1140	2.68

Statistics source

== Awards and honours ==
- 2014 CWHL Goaltender of the Year
- Most Outstanding Goaltender, 2015 ISBHF Worlds
- 2016 Clarkson Cup Most Valuable Player

Preceded by Genevieve Lacasse (2012-13)	CWHL Goaltender of the Year Award	Succeeded by Charline Labonte (2014-15)
Preceded by Charline Labonte (2015)	Most Valuable Player, Clarkson Cup Playoffs (2016)	Succeeded by Charline Labonte (2017)
