= Christine Bestland =

Canadian ice hockey player

- Born: April 28, 1992 (age 33) Brunkild, Manitoba, Canada
- Height: 5 ft 7 in (170 cm)
- Position: Forward
- Midget AAA CHA team: Pursuit of Excellence; Mercyhurst
- National team: Canada
- Playing career: 2010–present

Christine Bestland
Medal record

Representing Canada

U18 IIHF World Women Championships
Gold medal – first place	2010 United States	Tournament

Christine Bestland (born April 28, 1992) is a Canadian ice hockey player in the Mercyhurst Lakers women's ice hockey program. Prior to Mercyurst, Bestland was involved with Hockey Canada's Program of Excellence.

== Playing career ==
In high school, she played at Winnipeg's Balmoral Hall prep school. This same school produced her Mercyhurst teammate Bailey Bram. In March 2010, Bestland was one of eight female players from Manitoba that attended David Roy's Pursuit of Excellence hockey academy in Kelowna, B.C. She was part of a female midget AAA team that won the Challenge Cup tournament in Washington, D.C. by defeating Little Caesar's from Detroit 6–4 in the championship game of the 26-team tournament. The team's overall record in 2009–10 was 52–3, including a 7–1 loss to Sweden's Olympic team last month and three major tournament wins.

=== Hockey Canada ===
Bestland played on Canada's Under-18 women's hockey team as a 16-year-old. She also played for Hockey Canada's Pursuit of Excellence AAA midget team. Bestland was part of the Excellence squad that played Sweden's Olympic women's team prior to the Vancouver Games, losing by a 9–1 mark. At the 2008 National Women's U18 Championships, Bestland scored a goal in the bronze medal game (November 9, 2008) as Manitoba won beat Team Ontario Blue 3–1. In a March 24, 2010 contest versus the OWHA All-Stars, Bestland played for the Canadian National Under 18 Women's Team. Bestland would score the final marker in the contest as the OWHA All-Stars defeated the Under 18 team by a 3–2 tally. As a member of the gold medal-winning squad at the 2010 Under 18 IIHF Women's worlds, a hockey card of her was featured in the Upper Deck 2010 World of Sports card series.

=== Mercyhurst ===
As the Lakers went 6–1–0 in October 2010, Bestland scored four goals, including two in a 7–3 defeat of the Robert Morris Colonials. In addition, she had six assists. In her first game as a Laker, she scored a goal. She registered points in five of the seven games played and finished the month with a plus/minus rating of +13.

On December 3–4, 2010, Bestland scored three goals and had two assists as the Lakers swept the Purple Eagles for the first time since the 2008–09 season. She stretched her scoring streak to a career-long three games in Saturday's 7–2 victory.

From January 29–30, 2011, Bestland scored two goals and dished out an assist in the Lakers' swept Niagara at Dwyer Arena. She scored a goal in each game and dished out an assist for two points on the 29th.

In the 2011–12 Mercyhurst Lakers women's ice hockey season opener on September 30, 2011, Bestland was named the game's First Star in a 4–0 shutout over the nationally ranked Quinnipiac Bobcats.

On December 7, 2013, Bestland logged the 200th point of her NCAA career in an 8–0 victory against Penn State.

== Career stats ==
=== Canada Under 18 tournament ===
- Bestland competed for Team Manitoba in the Canadian National Women's Under 18 Hockey Championships.

Year	GP	Goals	Assists	Points	PIM	GWG
2007	5	4	1	5	2	0
2008	5	3	1	4	0	0
2009	5	3	5	8	6	1

=== NCAA ===
Year	GP	Goals	Assists	Points	PIM	PPG	SHG	GWG
2010–11	35	18	24	42	36	8	0	4

== Awards and honours ==
- 2009 National Women's U18 Championships, Game Star (Manitoba vs. Quebec)

=== NCAA ===
- CHA Rookie of the Week (Week of October 11, 2010)
- CHA Rookie of the Week (Week of November 1, 2010)
- CHA Rookie of the Week (Week of December 6, 2010)
- CHA Rookie of the Week (Week of January 24, 2011)
- CHA Rookie of the Week (Week of January 31, 2011)
- College Hockey America, Rookie of the Month, October 2010
- 2010–11 All-CHA Rookie Team selection
- CHA Player of the Week (Week of November 28, 2011)
- CHA Player of the Week (Week of January 9, 2012)

== Personal ==
Her brother, Darren Bestland, plays for the Brandon Wheat Kings.
