= Bailey Bram =

Canadian ice hockey player (born 1990)

- Born: September 5, 1990 (age 36) Winnipeg, Manitoba, Canada
- Height: 5 ft 8 in (173 cm)
- Weight: 139 lb (63 kg; 9 st 13 lb)
- Position: Forward
- Shot: Left
- Played for: Calgary Inferno; Linköping HC; Brampton Thunder; Mercyhurst Lakers
- National team: Canada
- Playing career: 2008–2020
Medal record
Olympic Games
Silver medal – second place	2018 Pyeongchang	Team
World Championships
Gold medal – first place	2012 United States
Silver medal – second place	2013 Canada
Silver medal – second place	2015 Sweden
Silver medal – second place	2016 Canada
Silver medal – second place	2017 United States
World U18 Championships
Silver medal – second place	2008 Canada

Bailey Bram Mitchell (born September 5, 1990) is a Canadian retired ice hockey player. As a member of Team Canada, she won a silver medal at the 2018 Winter Olympics and five IIHF Women's World Championship medals, one gold and four silver, from 2012 to 2017.

== Playing career ==
Bram's father, Bill, coached her in junior. She led the St. Adolphe Hawks in scoring in 2005–06. In 2006, she participated in the Mac's Midget Tournament with the Blazers of Balmoral Hall School. In addition, she won a silver medal with the Assiniboine Park Rangers at the 2006 Western Shield. With Team Manitoba, Bram won a bronze medal with Manitoba at the 2007 National Women's Under-18 Championships. In the same year, she won a silver medal with Manitoba at the 2007 Canada Winter Games. Bram won a gold medal at the Balmoral Hall tournament in 2007 and she captained Balmoral Hall and finished third in team scoring in 2007–08.

=== NCAA ===
During the 2008–09 season, Bram led all Mercyhurst Lakers and College Hockey America (CHA) freshmen in scoring. In addition, she posted a seven-game point-scoring streak (four goals, six assists) from Feb. 21 through NCAA semifinal vs. No. 2 Minnesota on March 20.

She recorded her first career goal, a game-winner, in first game, October 10, 2008, at Boston University. Seven days later, she recorded two assists, helping on Valerie Chouinard's game-winner, October 17 vs. Renssalaer. She scored two goals October 31 at Colgate and she scored a hat-trick, including the game-winner, February 7 at Niagara. Bram netted the game-winner in each game during weekend series February 27 and 28 at Wayne State. She scored multiple goals in two games and two or more points in seven contests.

In March 2009, Bram competed in the NCAA Frozen Four along with two other players from her hometown of Ste. Anne, Manitoba, population 1,500. Known colloquially as the Ste. Anne Three, Bram, Jocelyne Larocque of the Minnesota Duluth Bulldogs, and senior captain of the Minnesota Golden Gophers, Melanie Gagnon competed in the event.

On March 13, 2010: Bram scored two goals, including the game winner as the Lakers beat Boston University by a score of 4–1 in the NCAA Regionals. On October 15, 2010: Bram registered two assists, including her 100th career point, in a game against the Bemidji State Beavers. She became the 11th Lakers player to crack the century mark in the 4–0 win.

On January 14 and 15, 2011, Bram combined for nine points in the two wins over Brown. In the first win, Bram accumulated three assists for a 6–0 score. The following day, she registered two goals and four assists for a career-high six points. In addition, Mercyhurst notched 12 goals in a game for the first time since the 1999–2000 season. On February 25, 2011, (in the second period of a 6–2 win versus the Robert Morris Colonials), Bailey Bram assisted on Meghan Agosta's 151st career goal. The goal made Agosta the all-time leading goal scorer in NCAA history.

During the 2011–12 Mercyhurst Lakers women's ice hockey season, Bram experienced several milestones. She played in her 100th game for the Lakers on October 1, 2011. She would be held pointless as the Lakers would lose the game by a 1–0 tally to Quinnipiac. It was Quinnipiac's first victory over Mercyhurst in twelve regular season matches. Two weeks later (on October 15), Bram would register a hat trick as the Lakers blanked the Providence Friars women's ice hockey program by a 5–0 tally. On October 28, 2011, her sister (and Mercyhurst teammate) Shelby Bram would score her first career NCAA goal as Mercyhurst defeated the Lindenwood Lady Lions by a 7–0 tally. Of note, the October 28 match, marked the first time that Lindenwood hosted an NCAA Division I opponent in their home arena. Bailey also scored a goal in the game, marking the first time that the two sisters scored a goal in the same NCAA game.

In the following match versus Lindenwood, Bailey and her younger sister, Shelby, would each score two goals as the Lakers emerged as the victor in a 14–0 whitewash. Bailey Bram increased her scoring pace by notching five goals to go with five assists in two victories over the Yale Bulldogs on November 18 and 19, 2011. In the 9–1 win on November 18, Bram registered two goals and logged two assists. The following day, she had a hand in all six goals (three goals and three assists) in the Lakers 6–2 win. Bram earned her fifth career hat trick and second of the 2011–12 Mercyhurst Lakers women's ice hockey season. In the two game set versus the Bulldogs, her plus minus rating was a +6, while her six-point game on November 19 was the second time in the season that she registered at least six points in a game. Her first was a career-high seven points in a win over the Lindenwood Lady Lions. Statistically, she logged 14 goals and 11 assists in the first 10 games she played of the season.

On December 10, 2011, Bram had three assists, including one on the game-winner in a 3–2 overtime victory versus Boston College. It gave her 40 points in the first 16 games of the 2011–12 season. Of note, the assist on the game-winning goal helped Hillary Pattenden gain the 91st victory of her NCAA career, which tied former Wisconsin goaltender Jessie Vetter for the NCAA Division I record.

In a series versus CHA opponent Niagara on February 3–4, 2012, Bram had a five-point weekend. In the first game, she logged two goals, her first since December 15, to contribute to a 6–1 Lakers win. In the following game, a 3–3 draw, Bram had a hand in all three goals with one goal and two helpers. It was her 10th three-point game of the season. Of note, her first period goal was her 11th power play goal of the season, giving her the NCAA lead in that category. Her 2.46 points per game average also led the NCAA.

=== CWHL ===
Bram was selected by the Brampton Thunder in the 2012 CWHL Draft. She would help the club qualify for the 2013 Clarkson Cup playoffs while finishing among the league's Top 20 scorers.

Bram made her CWHL Debut on October 20, 2012, versus the Toronto Furies. During the second period, she would assist on a goal scored by Vicki Bendus, who also played with Bram at Mercyhurst. The following day, Bram would net her first CWHL goal, scoring on Furies goaltender Christina Kessler. Coincidentally, Bendus gained the assist on said goal, which was also scored in the second period. Adding to the milestone was that it was the first-ever CWHL victory for goaltender Florence Schelling.

In August 2014, Bram was traded to the Calgary Inferno for Jocelyne Larocque. Bram would make her debut for the Calgary Inferno on October 18, 2014, gaining a pair of assists in the first period of an eventual 5–4 loss versus the Toronto Furies. Of note, her first assist was credited on a power play goal scored by Haley Irwin, while the second was scored by Sarah Davis.

Bram's first goal as a member of the Inferno occurred on October 25, 2014. Scoring the first goal of the game for the Inferno, Louise Warren and Erica Kromm gained the assists. Bram would score on goaltender Catherine Herron in a 4–1 loss.

Appearing with the Calgary Inferno in the 2016 Clarkson Cup finals, Bram logged a −1 rating as the Inferno emerged victorious in a convincing 8–3 final.

=== Swedish Riksserien ===
In 2014, Bram went overseas to play in the Swedish Riksserien, signing with Linköping Hockey Club (LHC) on January 15, 2014. Bram won the Swedish Championship with LHC, the first for the team, on March 19, 2014. Bram scored the winning goal in the sudden death period in the final against Modo.

== Hockey Canada ==
- August 11, 2009: Bram helped Team Canada White defeat Sweden by a score of 4–0. The 2009 College Hockey America Rookie of the Year scored 1:43 into the third period to extend Team White's advantage to 2–0. It was her first goal as a member of the Canadian Under-22 program.
- August 17, 2009: Three current players and an alumna of the Mercyhurst College women's hockey team were selected to the 2009–10 Canadian National Women's Under-22 Team. Juniors Vicki Bendus and Jesse Scanzano, sophomore Bailey Bram and 2008 graduate Laura Mosier will make up part of the 23-player roster that is set to compete against the Canadian National Team.
- Bram scored two goals in the semi-final of the 2010 MLP Nations Cup to give an early 2–0 lead.
- January 10, 2010: In the gold medal game of the 2010 MLP Cup, Canada defeated Switzerland, 9–0 in Ravensburg, Germany. Jesse Scanzano and Bram each added a goal and an assist. Bram tied Vicki Bendus for the tournament lead with seven points each.
- She was part of the Canadian National Under 22 team that competed in the 2011 MLP Nations Cup. She scored one of the six goals in the gold medal game of the 2011 MLP Cup. In addition, she had three assists.
- In March 2011, she was invited to the Canadian national women's ice hockey team selection camp to determine the final roster for the 2011 IIHF Women's World Championship.
- During the 2011–12 Canada women's national ice hockey team season, she was invited to the Hockey Canada training camp in preparation for the 2012 IIHF Women's World Championship. In a March 29, 2012 exhibition match versus the Midget AAA Rousseau Royal de Laval-Montréal (contested at Duchesnay Arena in Aylmer, Quebec), Bram assisted on a goal by Gillian Apps as Team Canada prevailed by a 6–1 mark.
- In a game versus Russia at the 2012 IIHF Women's World Championship, Bram registered an assist in a 14–1 victory.
- During the 2013 IIHF Women's World Championship, Bram recorded her first career goal for Team Canada that would eventually become the game winner in an 8–0 win over Team Finland.
- On December 22, 2013, Bram was informed she had been cut from the final roster for Team Canada at the 2014 Winter Olympics in Sochi, the last roster cut made before the games began on 7 February 2014.
- On December 22, 2017, four years to the day after Bram was cut from the 2014 Olympic squad, she was announced as part of the 23-member roster that would represent Canada at the 2018 Winter Olympics in Pyeongchang.

In January 2020, Bram announced her retirement from Team Canada to pursue a career in massage therapy.

== Career statistics ==
=== NCAA ===
Year	GP	Goals	Assists	Points	PIM	PPG	SHG	GWG
2008–09	37	16	19	35	44	4	0	4
2009–10	33	29	27	56	50	13	5	9
2010–11	28	15	27	42	36	4	0	1
2011–12	32	27	41	68	46	12	2	3

=== Hockey Canada ===
Year	Event	GP	G	A	PTS
2007	U18 Exhibition (vs. USA)	3	0	1	1
2008	Pre-U18 Worlds	1	0	1	1
2008	U18 IIHF Worlds	5	3	4	7
2008	Exhibition (vs. USA)	2	1	0	1
2009	MLP Cup	5	1	2	3
2009	U22 Selection camp	2	1	0	1
2010	MLP Cup	3	4	3	7

=== CWHL ===
Year	Team	Games Played	Goals	Assists	Points	+/-	PIM	PPG	SHG	GWG
2012–13	Brampton Thunder									
2014–15	Calgary Inferno	24	4	10	14	−2	16	2	0	0

== Awards and honours ==
- One of forty five nominees for the 2010 Patty Kazmaier Memorial Award.
- 2009 CHA Rookie of the Year
- 2009 CHA All-Rookie Team
- CHA Player of the Week (October 26, 2009)
- CHA Player of the Week (December 7, 2009)
- CHA Offensive Player of the Week (Week of February 8, 2010)
- 2010 CHA All-Tournament Team
- 2010 All-College Hockey America First Team
- 2010 College Hockey America Three-Star Winner
- 2010 Mercyhurst Three-Star Winner
- 2010 Patty Kazmaier Award Top-10 Finalist
- College Hockey America Player of the Week (Week of January 17, 2011)
- 2010–11 Second Team All-CHA selection
- CHA Player of the Week (Week of October 31, 2011)
- CHA Player of the Month (Month of October 2011)
- CHA Player of the Week (Week of November 21, 2011)
- CHA Player of the Week (Week of February 6, 2012)
- Nominee, 15th annual Patty Kazmaier Memorial Award (2012)
- 2012 CHA First Team All-Conference
- In August 2017, Bram received the Athletes in Excellence Award from The Foundation for Global Sports Development in recognition of her community service efforts and work with youth.

=== Statistical leaders ===
- NCAA leader, 2009–10 season, Short handed goals (tied), 5
- 2012 CHA Overall Scoring Champion (66 points)
- 2012 CHA Overall Assists Leader (40 points)

== Personal life ==
Bailey Bram was born on September 5, 1990, in Winnipeg, Manitoba, to Bill and Bonnie Bram. She is one of eight siblings: five brothers, Terry, Billy, Ryan, Tyler, Brock, and two sisters, Mary and Shelby. Her father was the head coach of the Eastman Female Selects Midget AA team in Landmark, Manitoba. A team was named after her at the 2007 Female Atom Hockey Festival presented by the Manitoba Moose on December 29, at the MTS Centre in Winnipeg. Her younger sister, Shelby, has also competed for Canada. On February 16, 2011, Shelby Bram announced that she was joining Bailey at Mercyhurst College. The two represented Hockey Canada as teammates for the first time together at the 2012 Meco Cup.

In July 2019, Bram married Jonathon "Johnny" Mitchell at a ceremony in Grunthal, Manitoba.
