= 2011–12 Robert Morris Colonials women's ice hockey season =

College Hockey America Tournament Champions
- Conference: 1 CHA

Rankings
- USA Today/USA Hockey Magazine: Not ranked
- USCHO.com/CBS College Sports: Not ranked

Record
- Overall: 5-1-1
- Home: 3-1-0
- Road: 2-0-1
- Neutral: 0-0-0

Coaches and captains
- Head coach: Paul Colontino
- Assistant coaches: Brianne McLaughlin; Logan Bittle; Allison Rutledge
- Captain: Paige Pietrangelo
- Alternate captain(s): Kathryn Stack, Brianna Delaney, Dayna Newsom

The 2011–12 Robert Morris Lady Colonials ice hockey season saw the Colonials win the CHA Tournament for the first time in school history. The Lady Colonials participated in the Nutmeg Classic on November 25 and 26. In addition, the Lady Colonials hosted the RMU Showcase on December 30 at the CONSOL Energy Centre versus the Bemidji State Beavers of the WCHA.

== Offseason ==
- July 15: New Lady Colonials head coach Paul Colontino announced the hiring of former Colonial goaltender and Olympic silver medallist Brianne McLaughlin as an assistant coach.

=== Recruiting ===
Player	Nationality	Position	Defense
Chelsea Burdzy	United States	Forward	
Maddie Collias	United States	Forward	Played for Belle Tire in Michigan
Katie Fergus	Canada	Forward	Played for the Burlington Jr. Barracudas
Taylor Sakundiak	Canada	Forward	Played for the Edge School in Alberta
Maddie Collias	United States	Forward	Played for Belle Tire in Michigan
Katelyn Scott	United States	Forward	Played for Belle Tire in Michigan
Erin Staniewski	Canada	Forward	Played for the London Jr. D
Courtney Vinet	Canada	Forward	Played for the Edge School in Alberta
Rebecca Vint	Canada	Forward	Played for the Brampton Jr. Thunder

== Exhibition ==
Date	Opponent	Location	Time	Score
Fri, Sep 23	Penn State(Exh.)	Pittsburgh, Pa.	7:05 p.m.	RMU, 12-0
Sat, Sep 24	Waterloo Warriors (Exh.)	Pittsburgh, Pa.	6:05 p.m.	RMU, 4-1
Sat, Oct 01	Windsor Lancers (Exh.)	Pittsburgh, Pa.	2:05 p.m.	RMU, 4-1

- Sept. 23: The Colonials defeated Penn State by a 12-0 tally, as 16 of 18 skaters recorded points. Nine players had multi-point games. Sophomore Thea Imbrogno, and a pair of freshmen, Katie Fergus and Rebecca Vint each registered at least three points on the evening.

== Regular season ==
- October 7–8: Robert Morris freshman Katie Fergus accumulated three points in her NCAA debut with one goal and two assists. Against the Lindenwood Lions, she got her first-collegiate point fewer than nine minutes into the opening period. Later in the game, she scored her first goal as the Colonials were on the penalty kill. In the second game versus Lindenwood, she earned her first multi-goal game. Fergus became one of just two freshmen in Colonials history to register multi-point performances in the first two games of a season. Fergus finished the series versus Lindenwood by scoring three goals and two assists five points. In addition, she had eight shots to complement a +5 plus/minus.
- October 8, 2011: Brianna Delaney registered the sixth three-point game of her career at Robert Morris. With the achievement, she tied the Colonials all-time record for career points. The 24th-career multi-point game of her career increased her point total to 97. The total now equals the record that Sara O'Malley set during the 2010-11 campaign.
- October 21–22: On October 21, freshman Rebecca Vint recorded four points, including her first game-winning goal versus RPI. She became just the second Colonial ever to tally at least four points in a game away from home. She scored twice within the game's opening eight minutes. Her performance on the 21st marked her third multi-goal effort in her first five collegiate games. The following game, she registered a goal and an assist, and extended her goal scoring streak by scoring a goal in her sixth consecutive game. It marked the first time that any Colonials skater scored in any six consecutive contests in a single season. It was also her fifth multi-point game in the first six games of this season.
  - Prior to the 2011–12 season, no Colonials skater ever registered more than eight points or more than six goals in the team's first six games. Vint set records in both of those marks as she started the first six games of the season with 15 points, including nine goals. Through the first six games of the season, Vint led CHA in both goals and points, while ranking second in assists. In addition, she leads the NCAA in goals per game, while ranking second nationally in points per game.
- November 25: In the first game of the Nutmeg Classic, Thea Imbrogno scored the game-winning goal, a career first, as the Colonials defeated the Yale Bulldogs by a 1-0 mark. The Colonials' victory was their fifth overall. Said win extended the Lady Colonials unbeaten streak to a program-record eight games. For the season, the Lady Colonials have a 10-1-1 record, its best 12-game start in program history.
- On Friday, January 20, 2012, Brianna Delaney scored in the third period of a 4-2 loss to CHA rival Mercyhurst. After being hooked, she scored on a wrist shot top shelf as she was falling to the ice. With the score, Delaney reached three milestones. She became just the second Robert Morris player to reach the 50 goal plateau. In addition, the score marked her 20th point of the season. It made her the first player in school history to post four 20 point seasons. Said goal also marked the 113th point of her career, the most by any Robert Morris women's hockey player in school history.
- January 31: Rebecca Vint logged an assist in the third period at Princeton to tie the Colonials’ single-season points mark.
- February 3–4: In a sweep over CHA opponent Syracuse, Vint led all Colonials skaters in points. In the first game, she scored the game-winning goal to break the Colonials’ single-season record for points in one season. In the 4-3 win versus the Orange, it was Vint’s fourth game-winning goal of the season (a Colonials record). The following day, Vint tied the Colonials’ single-sea¬son mark for goals in a 5-2 triumph. In addition, she assisted on the game-winning goal to notch her 10th multi-point effort of the season.
- February 10: Rebecca Vint notched her fifth game-winning goal of the season, a new Colonials record. In addition, said goal also broke the school record for overall goals in a season. In the third period, she logged another goal to register her sixth multi-goal game of the campaign. The following day, Vint assisting on both RMU goals to break the single-season assist record. With the two assists, she also became the first Colonial to notch 40 points in a season. Her five game-winning goals leads all skaters in the CHA.
- February 18: In a contest versus Mercyhurst, Dayna Newsom recorded the game-tying goal with 3:09 remaining in the third period. Said goal helped the Colonials rally to a tie against nationally ranked Mercyhurst. By scoring the goal, Newsom not only helped the Colonials to a tie, but she played a small part in NCAA history. She prevented Lakers goaltender Hillary Pattenden from winning the 100th game of her NCAA career. Pattenden would have been the first women's goalie in NCAA history to earn 100 regular season wins, and it was the last regular season game of her career.

=== Standings ===
2011–12 College Hockey America standings
	Conference							Overall					
	GP	PTS	W	L	T	GF	GA	GP	W	L	T	GF	GA
#6 Mercyhurst†	6	9	4	1	1	24	16	24	18	5	1	118	47
Robert Morris*	6	7	3	2	1	9	9	24	14	8	2	73	44
Niagara	6	5	2	3	1	12	14	27	9	12	6	64	72
Syracuse	6	3	0	3	3	11	17	28	9	16	3	63	89
Wayne State	0	0	0	0	0	0	0	0	0	0	0	0	0
Championship: Robert Morris † indicates conference regular season champion * indicates conference tournament champion National rankings: Conference rankings: Updated February 2nd, 2012

- Rankings based on number of points in the conference
- Wayne State was scheduled to play in the 2011–12 season but the women's ice hockey program was dropped

=== Schedule ===
Date	Opponent	Location	Time	Score
Fri, Oct 07	LINDENWOOD	Pittsburgh, Pa.	7:05 p.m.	8-0
Sat, Oct 08	LINDENWOOD	Pittsburgh, Pa.	2:05 p.m.	7-2
Fri, Oct 14	MINNESOTA STATE	Pittsburgh, Pa.	7:05 p.m.	4-3 (OT)
Sat, Oct 15	MINNESOTA STATE	Pittsburgh, Pa.	2:05 p.m.	1-3
Fri, Oct 21	RPI	at Troy, N.Y.	7:00 p.m.	5-1
Sat, Oct 22	RPI	at Troy, N.Y.	4:00 p.m.	4-2
Fri, Oct 28	St. Cloud State	at St. Cloud, Minn.	8:07 p.m.	2-2
Sat, Oct 29	St. Cloud State	at St. Cloud, Minn.	3:07 p.m.	
Sat, Nov 12	Lindenwood	at Wentzville, Mo.	8:00 p.m.	6-2
Sun, Nov 13	Lindenwood	at Wentzville, Mo.	1:00 p.m.	6-0
Tue, Nov 22	Colgate	at Hamilton, N.Y.	7:00 p.m.	5-2
Fri, Nov 25	vs. Yale (Nutmeg Classic)	at Storrs, Conn.	7:00 p.m.	1-0
Sat, Nov 26	vs. Quinnipiac (Nutmeg Classic)	at Storrs, Conn.	TBD	2-3
Fri, Dec 09	SYRACUSE *	Pittsburgh, Pa.	3:05 p.m.	
Sat, Dec 10	SYRACUSE *	Pittsburgh, Pa.	2:05 p.m.	
Fri, Dec 30	BEMIDJI STATE	Pittsburgh, Pa.	1:00 p.m.	
Sat, Dec 31	BEMIDJI STATE	Pittsburgh, Pa.	5:15 p.m.	
Fri, Jan 06	Providence	at Providence, R.I.	7:00 p.m.	
Sat, Jan 07	Providence	at Providence, R.I.	1:00 p.m.	
Fri, Jan 20	MERCYHURST *	Pittsburgh, Pa.	7:05 p.m.	
Sat, Jan 21	Mercyhurst *	at Erie, Pa.	7:05 p.m.	
Fri, Jan 27	Niagara *	at Niagara University, N.Y.	7:05 p.m.	
Sat, Jan 28	NIAGARA *	Pittsburgh, Pa.	7:05 p.m.	
Mon, Jan 30	Princeton	at Princeton, N.J.	3:05 p.m.	
Fri, Feb 03	Syracuse *	at Syracuse, N.Y.	7:05 p.m.	
Sat, Feb 04	Syracuse *	at Syracuse, N.Y.	2:05 p.m.	
Fri, Feb 10	NIAGARA *	Pittsburgh, Pa.	7:05 p.m.	
Sun, Feb 12	Niagara *	at Niagara University, N.Y.	5:00 p.m.	
Fri, Feb 17	Mercyhurst *	at Erie, Pa.	7:05 p.m.	
Sat, Feb 18	MERCYHURST *	Pittsburgh, Pa.	7:05 p.m.	

==== Conference record ====
CHA school	Record
Mercyhurst	
Niagara	
Syracuse	
Wayne State	

== Postseason ==
=== CHA Tournament championship ===
The Colonials blocked 49 Laker shot attempts in the game. It is the highest-recorded blocked shots figure in a single game for the Colonials, as seven different Colonials blocked at least four shots in the game. Jamie Joslin led all Colonial skaters with nine blocks. Joslin assisted on RMU's second goal in the game, which moved her into a tie for the most points in a season by a Colonials defender with 16, respectively. Katelyn Scott scored the first goal of her NCAA career to open the scoring. Thea Imbrogno extended the Colonials lead to 2-0. At the 16:06 mark of the second, Mercyhurst cut the lead.

The Lakers were granted a great chance to tie it when they received two more power-play chances within two minutes after their first goal, but the RMU defense held firm and protected the lead. Just when it seemed as though the Lakers might take momentum into the intermission, Delaney drilled home a rebound with just 30 ticks left in the second to reestablish RMU's multi-goal advantage heading into the third. With less than a minute to play in the second period, Rebecca Vint and Kylie St. Louis assisted on a marker by Brianna Delaney that would stand as the game-winning goal. With seven seconds left to play, Mercyhurst scored on the power play, but were unable to tie the game. On the power play, the Colonials held the Lakers to a 2-for-12 mark. Heading into the game, the Lakers were the NCAA's best man-advantage unit.

Of note, Delaney played in the final game of her NCAA career. With the goal, she moved into sole possession of first place in career goals scored at Robert Morris with 53. In addition, she moved into first place in career GWG at Robert Morris. She extended her RMU career points record to 121, was subsequently named to the All-Tournament Team. Along with senior assistant captain Kathryn Stack and KristinDiCiocco, they were the first three Colonials ever to earn CHA All-Tournament honors.

== Awards and honors ==
- Brianna Delaney, RMU Female Student-Athlete of the Week (Week of October 26, 2011)
- Kristen DiCiocco, CHA Player of the Week (Week of December 12, 2011)
- Kristen DiCiocco, CHA Goaltender of the Week (Week of January 9, 2012)
- Katie Fergus, CHA Rookie of the Week (Week of October 10, 2011)
- Kylie St. Louis, Co-College Hockey America Player of the Week (Week of November 14, 2011)
- Kelsey Thomas, Co-College Hockey America Player of the Week (Week of November 14, 2011)
- Courtney Vinet, College Hockey America Goaltender of the Week (Week of November 14, 2011)
- Courtney Vinet, College Hockey America Rookie of the Week (Week of November 14, 2011)
- Rebecca Vint, College Hockey America Rookie of the Week (Week of October 17, 2011)
- Rebecca Vint, CHA Player of the Week (Week of October 24, 2011)
- Rebecca Vint, CHA Rookie of the Month (Month of October 2011)
- Rebecca Vint, CHA Player of the Week (Week of December 12, 2011)
- Rebecca Vint, CHA Rookie of the Week (Week of February 6, 2012)
- Rebecca Vint, 2012 Overall CHA Freshman Scoring Champion (42 points)

=== Other ===
- Kristen DiCiocco, Athlete of the Year by the Pittsburgh Chapter of the National Italian American Sports Hall of Fame
- Brianna Delaney, 2011 Dapper Dan Sportswoman of the Year award nominee
- Brianna Delaney, 2012 Hockey Humanitarian Award nominee
- Thea Imbrogno, Nominee, 15th annual Patty Kazmaier Memorial Award
- Rebecca Vint, Nominee, 15th annual Patty Kazmaier Memorial Award

=== Statistical leaders ===
- Kristen DiCiocco, 2012 Overall CHA leader, Saves (33 points)
