= Hillary Pattenden =

Canadian ice hockey player

- Born: December 27, 1990 (age 35) Surrey, British Columbia, Canada
- Height: 5 ft 6 in (168 cm)
- Weight: 120 lb (54 kg; 8 st 8 lb)
- Position: Goaltender
- Caught: Left
- Played for: Mercyhurst Lakers
- National team: Canada
- Playing career: 2007–2012

Hillary Pattenden (born December 27, 1990) is a Canadian former ice hockey goaltender who played with the Mercyhurst Lakers women's ice hockey program from 2008 to 2012. She held the NCAA Division I goaltender all-time most career wins title for 415 days, beginning on December 14, 2011, when she broke Jessie Vetter’s record of 91 wins until her own 100-win record was broken by Minnesota‘s Noora Räty on February 1, 2013 (Räty‘s 114 career win record was later broken by BC‘s Kaitie Burton on January 27, 2018). She was the first goaltender ever selected with the first overall pick in the CWHL, selected by the Calgary Inferno in the 2012 CWHL Draft, though she never played in the league and did not opt to pursue playing hockey in her post-collegiate career.

== Playing career ==
Prior to joining Mercyhurst, she played for the Pacific Steelers in British Columbia.

=== NCAA ===
- Pattenden played in and started 27 games as a freshman, posting a 24 win-3 loss-0 tie record, a 1.95 goals against average, a.906 save percentage and one shutout. Pattenden became the first freshman goaltender to post 20 or more wins in a single season. She won 12 consecutive decisions from Jan. 23 at Robert Morris through NCAA semifinal victory over Minnesota on March 20. Pattenden recorded her first collegiate win Oct. 10 at Boston University and won her first three starts of the season.
- October 17, 2009: Pattenden made a season-high 32 saves in the game.
- January 23–24, 2010: Pattenden earned both victories in the Lakers' two victories against Syracuse. She allowed just a power-play goal on Friday, while turning aside 20 Orange shots. With the score knotted at one on Saturday, Pattenden did not allow a goal for nearly 40 minutes as Mercyhurst built up a 4-1 advantage. The Lakers limited SU, the second-best power play in the league, to just two goals in 15 opportunities.
- On December 11, 2010, Pattenden earned her 12th win of the season with 22 saves in a 7-3 win over St. Lawrence. On January 21 and 22, 2011, Pattenden won both games as the Lakers swept Robert Morris. With the wins, the Lakers now have at least 20 wins for the tenth consecutive season. She stopped 18 shots in a 6-3 win on the 21st and 25 in the 7-1 triumph on January 22. With the wins, she moves to 18-5-0 on the season.
- January 29–30, 2011: Hillary Pattenden recorded back to back shutouts. She held Niagara scoreless in both games as the Lakers won 2-0 and 3-0. She stopped 10 shots in the first game and 15 in the second to mark her fourth and fifth shutouts of the season
- February 4–5: Pattenden stretched her winning streak to six games and became the college’s all-time wins leaders with both wins over Wayne State. She made 12 saves in the team’s 6-2 win on Friday to pick up her 74th career victory and tie class of 2008 netminder Laura Hosier for most wins in program history. The next day she became the all-time wins leaders with 19 stops as the Lakers won 3-1.

==== Race to the record ====
- In a pair of victories over the Yale Bulldogs on November 18 and 19, 2011, Pattenden won two more games to give her a career total of 87. The total is four shy of career leader, Jessie Vetter of Wisconsin. In the 9-1 victory on November 18, she stopped 14 of 15 Bulldogs shots. The following day, she stopped 21 of 23 shots in a 6-2 victory. The goal she allowed on November 18 snapped a consecutive scoreless streak of 206:36. Previous to the goal, she had not allowed a goal since the third period of a 5-4 win over the MSU Mavericks (on October 8).
- For the week of November 20, 2011, Pattenden earned two more victories. Said victories provided her with 89 career wins for her career. With the wins, the Lakers extended their winning streak to nine contests. Pattenden became two wins shy of tying the NCAA Division I record of 91 career wins, held by Jessie Vetter of the Wisconsin Badgers. In a November 22 triumph versus the St. Lawrence Skating Saints, she stopped 16-of-19 shots. The three goals she allowed were all St. Lawrence power play goals. The following day, she stopped 31 of 32 shots.
- She completed On December 10, 2011, Pattenden made a career high 48 saves in a 3-2 overtime victory versus Boston College. With the win, she earned the 91st victory of her NCAA career, tying former Wisconsin goaltender Jessie Vetter for the NCAA Division I record.
- She would break the record on December 14, 2011, in a 9-0 defeat of the Lindenwood Lady Lions.
- In a February 18, 2012 contest versus the Robert Morris Colonials, Hillary Pattenden competed in the final regular season game of her NCAA career. Heading into the game, she had 99 career regular season victories, and was aiming to be the first NCAA women's goaltender with 100 career wins. With a 4-3 Mercyhurst lead late in the third period, Colonials skater Dayna Newsom recorded a game-tying goal, as both teams skated to a 4-4 final score.

== Hockey Canada ==
Pattenden was selected to the Team Canada U18 squad in 2007 and played in the first-ever game in the history of the Canadian national women’s under-18 program on August 23, 2007, in Ottawa, Ontario. In two games versus the United States U18, she logged 29 minutes of play.

== Awards and honours ==
- Named top goaltender at the 2008 Western Canadian Midget Championships
- First team all-star squad at the 2008 Western Canadian Midget Championships
- 2008 runner-up for the B.C. Junior Female Athlete of the Year Award

=== CHA honours ===
- CHA Defensive Player of the Week (October 19, 2009)
- CHA Defensive Player of the Week (January 4, 2010)
- CHA Defensive Player of the Week (January 25, 2010)
- CHA Defensive Player of the Week (February 23, 2010)
- 2009-10 Pre-Season All-CHA Team selection
- College Hockey America Defensive Player of the Week (Week of December 12, 2010)
- CHA Goaltender of the Week (Week of January 31, 2011)
- CHA Goaltender of the Week (Week of February 7, 2011)
- 2010-11 CHA goaltending champion
- 2010-11 Second Team All-CHA selection
- CHA Defensive Player of the Week (Week of October 3, 2011)
- CHA Defensive Player of the Month (Month of October 2011)
- CHA Goaltender of the Week (Week of December 5, 2011)
- CHA Goaltender of the Week (Week of December 19, 2011)
- CHA Defensive Player of the Week (Week of February 6, 2012)

=== Statistical leaders ===
- NCAA career wins record holder,
- NCAA leader, 2008-09 season, Goalie winning percentage, .889
- NCAA leader, 2009-10 season, Goalie winning percentage, .871
- 2012 Overall CHA leader, Winning Percentage (.732)
- 2012 Overall CHA leader, Shutouts (6)

== Career stats ==
=== Hockey Canada ===
Year	Event	GP	MIN	GA	SO	AVG.	W	L	T
2007	Under 18 vs. USA	2	29	1	0	2.07	2	0	0

=== NCAA ===
Season	GP	MIN	GA	SV	Shots	Sv%	GAA	W	L	T	Win %
2008-09	27	1568 :33	51	489	540	.906	1.95	24	3	0	.889
2009-10	35	2063 :21	55	638	693	.921	1.60	29	3	3	.871
2010-11	33	1914 :10	65	619	684	.905	2.04	27	6	0	.818
2011-12	10	582 :51	14	231	245	.943	1.44	8	2	0	.800

== Personal life ==
Her mother, Wendy Barlow-Pattenden, was an All-American tennis player at Brigham Young University and played six years professionally. Her uncle Hugh Barlow was a Memorial Cup champion with St. Catharines of the OHL. Her grandfather, Bob Barlow, was the captain of the Vancouver Canucks of the Western Hockey League during the 1968–69 seasons and played 77 games in the NHL with the Minnesota North Stars in the 1969–70 and 1970–71 seasons, accumulating 33 points.

Awards and achievements
Preceded by Meghan Agosta	CWHL first overall draft pick 2012	Succeeded by Jessica Wong
