= 2011–12 Syracuse Orange women's ice hockey season =

- Conference: 4 CHA
- Home ice: Tennity Ice Pavilion

Rankings
- USA Today/USA Hockey Magazine: Not ranked
- USCHO.com/CBS College Sports: Not ranked

Record
- Overall: 10–22–3

Coaches and captains
- Head coach: Paul Flanagan

The Syracuse Orange represent Syracuse University in College Hockey America. The Orange will attempt to qualify for the NCAA tournament for the first time in school history.

== Offseason ==
=== Recruiting ===
Player	Nationality	Position	Notes
Jordyn Burns	United States	Defense	In Burns four years with Benilde-St. Margaret's high school, the team had an overall record of 76–16–6
Shiann Darkangelo	United States	Forward	She won the gold medal at the 2011 International Ice Hockey Federation Women's World U18 Championships
Nicole Ferrara	United States	Forward	Ferrara recorded 46 goals and 44 assists in 79 games played throughout her career at the Rivers School
Kaillie Goodnough	United States	Defense	Goodnough recorded 39 goals, 78 assists and finished +100 during her career at National Sports Academy
Casey Hirsch	United States	Forward	She participated for Maple Grove high school, recording 94 goals and 86 assists in her career
Laurie Kingsbury	Canada	Forward	She represented Canada at the 2009 and 2010 IIHF World Women's Under-18 Championships; She appeared on a hockey card in the Upper Deck 2010 World of Sports card series. She was a member of the 2010–11 Ligue de hockey féminin collégial AA All-Star team.
Julie Knerr	Canada	Forward	Knerr tallied 17 goals and 28 assists in 59 games played during her career at John Abbott College and played in the 2010 and 2011 CEGEP all-star game with Laurie Kingsbury
Allie LaCombe	United States	Forward	Her cousin Christina LaCombe is currently a member of the Orange. LaCombe was a semifinalist for the 2011 Minnesota Ms. Hockey Award

== Exhibition ==
=== East/West showcase ===
Date	Opponent	Time	Location	Result	Notes
Fri Sept 30	St. Cloud State	4 pm	Minneapolis, MN		
Sat Oct 1	Minnesota	7 pm	Minneapolis, MN		

== Regular season ==
=== Standings ===
2011–12 College Hockey America standings
	Conference							Overall					
	GP	PTS	W	L	T	GF	GA	GP	W	L	T	GF	GA
#6 Mercyhurst†	6	9	4	1	1	24	16	24	18	5	1	118	47
Robert Morris*	6	7	3	2	1	9	9	24	14	8	2	73	44
Niagara	6	5	2	3	1	12	14	27	9	12	6	64	72
Syracuse	6	3	0	3	3	11	17	28	9	16	3	63	89
Wayne State	0	0	0	0	0	0	0	0	0	0	0	0	0
Championship: Robert Morris † indicates conference regular season champion * indicates conference tournament champion National rankings: Conference rankings: Updated February 2nd, 2012

- Rankings based on number of points in the conference
- Wayne State was scheduled to play in the 2011–12 season but the women's ice hockey program was dropped

=== Schedule ===
Date	Opponent	Time	Result	Record	Conference Record
Fri, Oct 7	Northeastern University	3 p.m.	Boston, Mass.		
Sat, Oct 8	University of New Hampshire	5 p.m.	Durham, N.H.		
Fri, Oct 14	Clarkson University	7 p.m.	Tennity Ice Pavilion		
Sat, Oct 15	Clarkson University	3:30 p.m.	Potsdam, N.Y.		
Wed, Oct 19	Colgate University	7 p.m.	Tennity Ice Pavilion		
Fri, Oct 21	Union College	7 p.m.	Tennity Ice Pavilion		
Sat, Oct 22	Union College	4 p.m.	Tennity Ice Pavilion		
Fri, Oct 28	University of Connecticut	7 p.m.	Tennity Ice Pavilion		
Sat, Oct 29	University of Connecticut	4 p.m.	Tennity Ice Pavilion		
Tue, Nov 1	Cornell University	7 p.m.	Ithaca, N.Y.		
Fri, Nov 4	McGill University	TBA Tennity Ice Pavilion			
Fri, Nov 18	Ohio State University	7 p.m.	Tennity Ice Pavilion		
Sat, Nov 19	Ohio State University	4 p.m.	Tennity Ice Pavilion		
Fri, Nov 25	Rensselaer Polytechnic Institute	7 p.m.	Troy, N.Y.		
Sat, Nov 26	Rensselaer Polytechnic Institute	4 p.m.	Troy, N.Y.		
Fri, Dec 2	Lindenwood University	7 p.m.	Tennity Ice Pavilion		
Sat, Dec 3	Lindenwood University	2 p.m.	Tennity Ice Pavilion		
Fri, Dec 9	• Robert Morris University	3 p.m.	Moon Township, Pa.		
Sat, Dec 10	* Robert Morris University	2 p.m.	Moon Township, Pa.		
Mon, Jan 2	Colgate University	7 p.m.	Hamilton, N.Y.		
Fri, Jan 6	* Mercyhurst College	7 p.m.	Tennity Ice Pavilion		
Sat, Jan 7	* Mercyhurst College	2 p.m.	Tennity Ice Pavilion		
Tue, Jan 17	Cornell University	7 p.m.	Tennity Ice Pavilion		
Fri, Jan 20	* Niagara University	7 p.m.	Tennity Ice Pavilion		
Sat, Jan 21	* Niagara University	2 p.m.	Tennity Ice Pavilion		
Fri, Jan 27	Quinnipiac University	7 p.m.	Hamden, Conn.		
Sat, Jan 28	Quinnipiac University	4 p.m.	Hamden, Conn.		
Fri, Feb 3	* Robert Morris University	7 p.m.	Tennity Ice Pavilion		
Sat, Feb 4	* Robert Morris University	2 p.m.	Tennity Ice Pavilion		
Fri, Feb 10	* Mercyhurst College	7 p.m.	Erie, Pa.		
Sat, Feb 11	* Mercyhurst College	2 p.m.	Erie, Pa.		
Fri, Feb 24	* Niagara University	2 p.m.	Niagara Falls, N.Y.		
Sat, Feb 25	* Niagara University	2 p.m.	Niagara Falls, N.Y.		

== Awards and honors ==
- Kallie Billadeau, CHA Defensive Player of the Week (Week of October 31, 2011)
- Kallie Billadeau, CHA Defensive Player of the Week (Week of January 31, 2011)
- Jenesica Drinkwater, CHA Defensive Player of the Week, (Week of February 27, 2012)
- Nicole Ferrara, Co-CHA Rookie of the Week (Week of December 5, 2011)
- Nicole Ferrara, CHA Rookie of the Week (Week of January 31, 2011)
- Allie LaCombe, CHA Rookie of the Week (Week of October 24, 2011)
- Margot Scharfe, CHA Player of the Week (Week of January 31, 2011)
- Margot Scharfe, CHA Player of the Week, (Week of February 27, 2012)
