= 2011–12 Niagara Purple Eagles women's ice hockey season =

- Conference: 3 CHA

Rankings
- USA Today/USA Hockey Magazine: Not ranked
- USCHO.com/CBS College Sports: Not ranked

Record
- Overall: 4-5-1

Coaches and captains
- Head coach: Josh Sciba
- Assistant coaches: Shivaun Siegl; Allyson Weidner
- Captain: Kathleen Bortuzzo

The Niagara Purple Eagles represent Niagara University in College Hockey America. The Purple Eagles attempted to qualify for the NCAA tournament for the second time in school history.

== Offseason ==
- August 23: Head coach Chris MacKenzie resigned as the head coach of the Purple Eagles. Assistant coach Josh Sciba was named interim head coach for the 2011-12 season.

=== Recruiting ===
Player	Nationality	Position	Notes
Delaney Middlebrook	United States	Defense	Member of Minnesota Ice Cats 2010 U-19 NAHA Champions
Kelsey Gunn	Canada	Defense	Played for Ottawa Senators of PWHL
Amy Helfrich	Canada	Forward	Won a gold medal with Team Alberta at the Canada Winter Games in 2011
Kayla Raniwsky	Canada	Forward	Led the Southwest Wildcats with 42 points, including 26 goals in 36 games played during the 2010-11 season
Kalli Funk	United States	Forward	2011 Minnesota State All Conference with Cretin-Derham Hall High School; Also played with Minnesota Thoroughbreds
Abby Ryplanski	Canada	Goaltender	2011 Liz Turgeon Player of the Year nominee

== Regular season ==
=== Standings ===
2011–12 College Hockey America standings
	Conference							Overall					
	GP	PTS	W	L	T	GF	GA	GP	W	L	T	GF	GA
#6 Mercyhurst†	6	9	4	1	1	24	16	24	18	5	1	118	47
Robert Morris*	6	7	3	2	1	9	9	24	14	8	2	73	44
Niagara	6	5	2	3	1	12	14	27	9	12	6	64	72
Syracuse	6	3	0	3	3	11	17	28	9	16	3	63	89
Wayne State	0	0	0	0	0	0	0	0	0	0	0	0	0
Championship: Robert Morris † indicates conference regular season champion * indicates conference tournament champion National rankings: Conference rankings: Updated February 2nd, 2012

- Rankings based on number of points in the conference
- Wayne State was scheduled to play in the 2011–12 season but the women's ice hockey program was dropped

=== Schedule ===
Date	Time	Opponent	Location	Result	Record	Conference Record
9/30/2011	7:00 PM	New Hampshire	Niagara Univ.	Loss, 4-6	0-1-0	0-0-0
10/1/2011	1:00 PM	New Hampshire	Niagara Univ.	Loss, 2-3	0-2-0	0-0-0
10/7/2011	7:00 PM	No. 4 Boston University	Boston, Mass	Loss, 1-3	0-3-0	0-0-0
10/8/2011	3:00 PM	No. 4 Boston University	Boston, Mass	Loss, 2-5	0-4-0	0-0-0
10/14/2011	7:00 PM	RPI	Niagara Univ.	Win, 5-4 OT	1-4-0	0-0-0
10/15/2011	2:00 PM	RPI	Niagara Univ.	Win, 3-2	2-4-0	0-0-0
10/18/2011	7:00 PM	St. Lawrence	Niagara Univ.	Loss, 3-6	2-5-0	0-0-0
10/21/2011	7:00 PM	Yale	New Haven, CT	Win, 5-1	3-5-0	0-0-0
10/22/2011	3:00 PM	Princeton	Princeton, NJ	Win, 3-1	4-5-0	0-0-0
10/28/2011	2:00 PM	Vermont	Burlington, VT	Tie, 3-3	4-5-1	0-0-0

== Awards and honors ==
- Kalli Funk, CHA Rookie of the Week (Week of November 7, 2011)
- Kalli Funk, CHA Rookie of the Week (Week of January 31, 2011)
- Kelsey Gunn, CHA Rookie of the Week (Week of January 16, 2012)
- Jenna Hendrikx, CHA Player of the Week (Week of October 3, 2011)
- Delaney Middlebrook, CHA Rookie of the Week (Week of October 3, 2011)
- Sarah Moses, CHA Defensive Player of the Week (Week of November 21, 2011)
- Sarah Moses, CHA Defensive Player of the Week (Week of January 23, 2012)
- Erica Owczarczak, CHA Player of the Week (Week of November 7, 2011)
- Kayla Raniwsky, CHA Rookie of the Week, (Week of January 23, 2012)
- Kayla Raniwsky, CHA Rookie of the Week, (Week of February 27, 2012)
- Abby Ryplanski, CHA Defensive Player of the Week (Week of October 24, 2011)
- Abby Ryplanski, CHA Defensive Player of the Week (Week of November 7, 2011)
- Kelsey Welch, Niagara University Student Athlete of the Week (Week of October 17, 2011)
