= 2008–09 Mercyhurst Lakers women's ice hockey season =

College Hockey America champions NCAA Women's Ice Hockey Championship, Runner-up
- Conference: CHA
- Home ice: Mercyhurst Ice Center

Rankings
- USA Today/USA Hockey Magazine: TBD
- USCHO.com/CBS College Sports: TBD

Record
- Overall: 31-6
- Home: 17-0
- Road: 13-5
- Neutral: 1-1

Coaches and captains
- Head coach: Michael Sisti
- Captain: Meghan Agosta
- Alternate captain: Vicki Bendus

The 2008–09 Mercyhurst Lakers women's ice hockey team represented Mercyhurst College in the 2008–09 NCAA Division I women's ice hockey season. The Lakers were coached by Michael Sisti and had a 16-0 record in their conference. Assisting Sisti were Paul Colontino and Louis Goulet. Mike Folga was the Head Equipment Manager. The Lakers qualified for the Frozen Four and were finalists in the 2009 NCAA Women's Ice Hockey Championship. The Lakers went 16-0 in conference play last season en route to their seventh-straight CHA Title. From 2002 to 2009, the Lakers were 74-3-5 in the regular season against CHA competition and 14-0 in the postseason.

== Exhibition ==
Date	Opponent	Location	Score
9/27/2008	Guelph	Erie, Pa.	9-2
10/03/2008	Team USA	Blaine, MN.	1-4
10/04/2008	Team USA	Blaine, MN.	2-4

== Regular season ==
- In the season-opening victory Oct. 10 at Boston University, Vicki Bendus registered two assists. Bendus scored a game-winning goal and added two helpers Nov. 22 at Brown. On December 6, Vicki Bendus scored two goals, including game-winner, vs. Syracuse. She had one of her best games as she scored one goal and added two assists, including a helper on Meghan Agosta’s game-winner, in win over Niagara Feb. 21.In addition, she assisted on Bailey Bram’s game-winning goal Feb. 27 at Wayne State.
- Bailey Bram recorded her first career goal, a game-winner, in first game, Oct. 10 at Boston University. Seven days later, she recorded two assists, helping on Valerie Chouinard’s game-winner, Oct. 17 vs. Renssalaer. She scored two goals Oct. 31 at Colgate and she scored a hat trick, including the game-winner, Feb. 7 at Niagara. Bram netted the game-winner in each game during weekend series Feb. 27 and 28 at Wayne State. She scored multiple goals in two games and two or more points in seven contests.
- Rookie goaltender Hillary Pattenden played in and started 27 games as a freshman, while posting a 24-3-0 record along with a 1.95 goals against average, .906 save percentage and one shutout. Pattenden became the first freshman goaltender to post 20 or more wins in a single season. She won 12 consecutive decisions from Jan. 23 at Robert Morris through NCAA semifinal victory over Minnesota on March 20. Pattenden recorded her first collegiate win Oct. 10 at Boston University and won her first three starts of the season.
- Meghan Agosta appeared in 32 games and led the team and conference with 41 goals, 37 assists, 78 points, 14 power-play goals, three shorthanded goals, +40 plus/minus rating, and 280 shots.
- Vicki Bendus was named assistant captain. She ranked second on the team and tied for third in the conference with five game-winning goals and two shorthanded tallies. She ranked third on the team and third in the CHA in assists. She ranked seventh in CHA in points scored.
- Jesse Scanzano led the team with a .191 shooting percentage while ranking second on team in goals, assists, points, and power-play goals (11). For her efforts, she was named to the All-CHA Second Team. Scanzano’s numbers were the fifth-best single-season offensive numbers in program history. She averaged 2.25 points per game during 16 conference games and was second in conference scoring behind teammate Meghan Agosta. Overall, she ranked sixth in the nation in points scored, and eighth in NCAA Division I in goals and assists

=== Scoring streaks ===
- Vicki Bendus had a seven-game point scoring streak from Nov. 14 through Dec. 12, registering four multiple-point contests and two game-winners during that span. In addition, she recorded a goal in four straight games from Nov. 21 through Dec. 6. From Feb. 13 through Feb. 27, she recorded 10 assists in five-game span.
- Bailey Bram posted a seven-game point-scoring streak (four goals, six assists) from Feb. 21 through NCAA semifinal vs. No. 2 Minnesota on March 20

=== Roster ===
Number	Name	Height	Position	Shoots	Class
1	Nicole Nelson	5-8	G	L	Sr.
4	Pamela Zgoda	5-6	D	R	Fr.
6	Johanna Malmstrom	5-8	D	L	Jr.
8	Melissa Lacroix	5-9	D	R	So.
9	Kelley Steadman	5-11	F	R	Fr.
11	Vicki Bendus	5-1	F	R	So.
13	Bailey Bram	5-7	F	L	Fr.
15	Anna Johnson	5-11	D	L	Fr.
16	Hayley McMeekin	5-5	F	L	Sr.
18	Valerie Chouinard	5-5	F	R	Sr.
20	Meghan Corbett	5-6	F	R	Fr.
21	Ashley Cockell	5-8	D	R	So.
22	Jess Jones	5-4	F	L	Fr.
23	Jesse Scanzano	6-0	F	R	So.
26	Geena Prough	5-2	F/D	R	So.
27	Julie Hersey	5-8	F	R	Fr.
28	Cassea Schols	5-9	D	R	So.
30	Hillary Pattenden	5-6	G	L	Fr.
35	Courtney Drennen	5-7	G	L	Sr.
87	Meghan Agosta	5-6	F	L	Jr.

=== Schedule ===
Date	Opponent	Location	Score
10/10/2008	Boston University	Boston, MA.	4-2
10/11/2008	Boston University	Boston, MA.	2-3
10/17/2008	RPI	Erie, Pa.	2-1
10/18/2008	RPI	Erie, Pa.	4-1
10/24/2008	Clarkson	Potsdam, N.Y.	2-5
10/25/2008	Clarkson	Potsdam, N.Y.	2-4
10/31/2008	Colgate	Hamilton, N.Y.	3-4
11/1/2008	Colgate	Hamilton, N.Y.	4-3 OT
11/14/2008	Syracuse	Syracuse, N.Y.	4-1
11/15/2008	Syracuse	Syracuse, N.Y.	7-1
11/21/2008	Providence	Providence, R.I.	3-0
11/22/2008	Brown	Providence, R.I.	5-1
12/5/2008	Syracuse	Erie, Pa.	5-1
12/6/2008	Syracuse	Erie, Pa.	9-2
12/12/2008	No. 4 St. Lawrence	Erie, Pa.	5-2
12/13/2008	No. 4 St. Lawrence	Erie, Pa.	2-1
1/10/2009	Vermont	Erie, Pa.	8-1
1/11/2009	Vermont	Erie, Pa.	8-1
1/16/2009	No. 10 Connecticut	Storrs, Ct.	2-3
1/17/2009	No. 10 Connecticut	Storrs, Ct.	5-2
1/23/2009	Robert Morris	Moon Township, Pa.	6-4
1/24/2009	Robert Morris	Moon Township, Pa.	5-0
1/30/2009	No. 10 Wayne State	Erie, Pa.	4-2
1/31/2009	No. 10 Wayne State	Erie, Pa.	4-2
2/7/2009	Niagara	Niagara University, N.Y.	8-2
2/8/2009	Niagara	Niagara University, N.Y.	5-0
2/13/2009	Robert Morris	Erie, Pa.	5-1
2/14/2009	Robert Morris	Erie, Pa.	8-1
2/20/2009	Niagara	Erie, Pa.	7-0
2/21/2009	Niagara	Erie, Pa.	8-1
2/27/2009	Wayne State	Detroit, Mich.	4-3
2/28/2009	Wayne State	Detroit, Mich.	4-2

== Player stats ==
=== Skaters ===
Player	GP	Goals	Assists	Points	Shots	+/-	PIM
Meghan Agosta	32	41	37	78	280	+40	36
Jesse Scanzano	37	27	35	62	141	+37	72
Valerie Chouinard	34	21	24	45	174	+27	16
Vicki Bendus	37	11	30	41	115	+14	38
Bailey Bram	37	16	19	35	130	+26	42
Hayley McMeekin	37	9	26	35	119	+20	34
Jess Jones	37	16	18	34	98	+33	24
Ashley Cockell	37	6	21	27	80	+38	70
Kelley Steadman	37	13	9	22	110	+14	44
Melissa Lacroix	37	2	16	18	61	+36	50
Cassea Schols	36	4	13	17	50	+31	52
Geena Prough	37	3	13	16	83	+36	26
Meghan Corbett	35	6	5	11	32	+11	8
Pamela Zgoda	36	0	7	7	30	+12	12
Johanna Malmstrom	32	1	2	3	15	+8	14
Lauren Ragen	10	0	3	3	11	+1	2
Julie Hersey	31	0	2	2	2	+3	6
Anna Johnson	36	0	1	1	0	+13	12
Hillary Pattenden	29	0	1	1	0	+0	0

=== Goaltenders ===
Player	Games Played	Minutes	Goals Against	Wins	Losses	Ties	Shutouts	Save %	Goals Against Average
Nicole Nelson	4	44:06	0	0	0	0	0	1.000	0.00
Hillary Pattenden	12	606:09	17	7	3	0	2	.926	1.68
Courtney Drennen	29	1568:33	51	24	3	0	1	.906	1.95

== Postseason ==
Vicki Bendus recorded four assists in the postseason. She assisted twice in the CHA quarterfinal victory over Niagara March 6. Meghan Corbett registered the game-winning goal in CHA final against Wayne State on March 7, after netting one goal in CHA semifinal March 6 vs. Niagara

On March 14, Bendus and Bailey Bram both got the helper on Kelley Steadman’s goal in NCAA quarterfinal win over No. 7 St. Lawrence. During the postseason, Meghan Corbett tallied three postseason goals, including a second period marker in national semifinal victory over No. 2 Minnesota March 20 In that game, Bram scored a first-period goal.

=== College Hockey America championship ===
- Seminfinals
  - Mercyhurst 8, Niagara 2
- Finals
  - Mercyhurst 6, Wayne State 1

=== NCAA Hockey tournament ===
- NCAA Quarterfinals (played in Erie, Pa.)
  - Mercyhurst 3, St. Lawrence 1
- NCAA Frozen Four Semifinals (played in Boston, Ma.)
  - Mercyhurst 5, Minnesota 4
- NCAA Frozen Four Finals (played in Boston, Ma.)
  - Wisconsin 5, Mercyhurst 0
  - The game was played on March 22. Jessie Vetter stopped 37 shots for an NCAA record 14th shutout of the season (it was also her second in a national championship game) as Wisconsin won its third women's hockey title in four years with a 5-0 victory over Mercyhurst.

== Awards and honors ==
- Meghan Agosta, RBK Hockey/AHCA First Team All-American
- Meghan Agosta, Patty Kazmaier Memorial Award Top Three Finalist
- Meghan Agosta, 2009 Frozen Four All-Tournament Team
- Meghan Agosta, CHA Player of the Year
- Meghan Agosta, CHA Three Star Player of the Year
- Meghan Agosta, All-CHA First Team
- Meghan Agosta, 2009 CHA All-Tournament Team
- Bailey Bram, 2009 CHA Rookie of the Year
- Bailey Bram, 2009 CHA All-Rookie Team
- Jess Jones, 2009 College Hockey America All-Rookie Team
- Jess Jones, 2009 College Hockey America All-Tournament Team
- Hillary Pattenden, 2009 All-CHA Second Team
- Hillary Pattenden, 2009 CHA All-Rookie Team
- Hillary Pattenden, 2009 CHA All-Tournament Team
