= 2016 Clarkson Cup =

2016 ice hockey championship series

	1	Total
Calgary Inferno	8	8
Canadiennes de Montreal	3	3
- Location(s): Ottawa, Ontario
- Dates: March 13, 2016
- Hall of Famers: Inferno: Hayley Wickenheiser (2019); Canadiennes: Caroline Ouellette (2023)

The 2016 Clarkson Cup was a women's ice hockey championship that was contested at Canadian Tire Centre in Ottawa, Ontario, the first contested on NHL ice, to determine the champion of the Canadian Women's Hockey League. Held on March 13, 2016, the Calgary Inferno defeated the Canadiennes de Montreal 8-3 to claim their first title. Blayre Turnbull, Brianne Jenner, Jessica Campbell and Rebecca Johnston each scored twice. The first goal scored by an Inferno player was Rebecca Johnston while Blayre Turnbull was credited with the Cup winning goal. Goaltender Delayne Brian was recognized as the Most Valuable Player.

== Calgary Inferno – 2016 Clarkson Cup champions ==
Defenders

- 4 Brigitte Lacquette Canada
- 5 Kanae Aoki Japan
- 8 Erica Kromm United States
- 11 Jacqui Pierri Canada
- 12 Meaghan Mikkelson Canada
- 16 Kristen Hagg Canada
- 24 Hayleigh Cudmore Canada

Forwards

- 6 Rebecca Johnston (Assistant Captain) Canada
- 7 Brittany Esposito Canada
- 9 Sarah Davis Canada
- 14 Jenna Cunningham Canada
- 15 Elana Lovell Canada
- 17 Bailey Bram (Assistant Captain) Canada
- 18 Aina Takeuchi Japan
- 19 Brianne Jenner (Captain) Canada
- 20 Jessica Campbell Canada
- 22 Hayley Wickenheiser Canada
- 26 Blayre Turnbull Canada
- 27 Jillian Saulnier Canada
- 28 Louise Warren Canada

Goaltenders

- 1 Kathy Desjardins Canada
- 30 Delayne Brian Canada

Coaching and Administrative Staff

- Chantal Champagne (General Manager)
- Scott Reid (Head coach)
- Gina Kingsbury (Assistant coach)

== Awards and honours ==
- Most Valuable Player, Delayne Brian, Calgary Inferno
- First Star of the Game, Delayne Brian
- Second Star of the Game, Rebecca Johnston, Calgary Inferno
- Third Star of the Game, Blayre Turnbull, Calgary Inferno
