= Wayne State Warriors women's ice hockey =

- University: Wayne State University
- Conference: CHA
- Head coach: N/A
- Arena: City Sports Ice Arena; Detroit, Michigan
- Colors: Green and gold

Conference regular season champions
- CHA: 2008

The Wayne State Warriors women's ice hockey is a defunct college ice hockey program represented at Wayne State University. The Warriors competed at the NCAA Division I level in the Great Lakes Women's Hockey Association from 1999–2002 and in College Hockey America 2002–2011.

== Year by year ==
Year	Wins	Losses	Ties	Coach	Postseason
2010–11	8	21	2	Jim Fetter	
2009–10	9	18	4	Jim Fetter	
2008–09	21	9	2	Jim Fetter	
2007–08	22	9	3	Jim Fetter	Lost CHA Tournament Finals
2006–07	15	18	1	Jim Fetter	Lost CHA Tournament Finals
2005–06	14	16	5	Jim Fetter	
2004–05	13	17	3	Jim Fetter	
2003–04	15	15	4	Jim Fetter	
2002–03	10	19	1	Tom O’Malley	
2001–02	6	23	2	Tom O’Malley	
2000–01	5	23	2	Tom O’Malley	
1999-00	0	21	0	Tom O’Malley	

- From 1999 to 2002, the Warriors were in the Great Lakes Women's Hockey Association.

== CIS Exhibition ==
Date	Opponent	Location	Time	Score
Fri. Sept. 25, 2009	York University	Detroit, Mich.	7 p.m.	3–2

== History ==
Wayne State finished in second place in the 2005–06 CHA regular season standings with a record of 6–4–2. Mercyhurst player Valerie Chouinard tied for the CHA league scoring title with a pair of Wayne State rookies: Melissa Boal and Sam Poyton. Each had 19 points in 12 CHA contests. All three newcomers were voted to the All-CHA First Team. In addition, Jessica Snelgrove was selected CHA Student-Athlete of the Year.

In 2006–07, Wayne State lost the CHA Tournament finals by a 4–1 score to the Mercyhurst Lakers. The following season, Wayne State tied Mercyhurst for the regular-season title with a 9–2–1 conference mark.

The Warriors were given the No. 1 seed because their record against Mercyhurst was 2–1–1. The Lakers would play the Warriors in the CHA Trounament Final for the second consecutive year. The Lakers prevailed in overtime by a 2–1 score.

During the 2007–08 season, Wayne State had the top four scorers in the nation in terms of points per game. Melissa Boal was the leader with 2.16 points per game. She would also be a top-10 finalist for the Patty Kazmaier Award. The Warriors Sam Poyton (1.94 points per game) and Lindsay DiPietro (1.88 points per game) ranked third and fourth. During the 2007–08 season, Sam Poyton of Wayne State set an NCAA record (since tied) for most game winning goals in one season with 13. DiPietro was first in the NCAA with 48 assists. The Warriors were ranked 10th in the nation at the end of the 2007–08 season.

- Oct 3, 2009: Wayne State skated to only its second scoreless tie in 10 years. Delayne Brian earned her second career shutout and had 37 saves.
- January 30, 2010: Wayne State University's women's hockey program officially celebrates its 10th anniversary on January 30–31. At the City Sports Center, the 2009–10 Warriors (8–11–3, 4–4–0 CHA) will host the Syracuse Orange (13–12–1, 4–4–0 CHA) in a College Hockey America series.

In October 2010, DeLayne Brian was the starting goalie in all eight of the Warriors games. Among the highlights, she accumulated 61 saves on Oct. 1–2 against Bemidji State. On top of her 61 saves, she held the Beavers to 1-for-13 on the power play. On Oct. 8, she registered her fifth career shutout, this time against St. Cloud State. Against nationally ranked Boston University, she had a career-high 75 saves in the two game series. Against the Colgate Raiders, she would earn another shutout as she notched 31 saves (on Oct. 22). She led all CHA netminders with a .932 save percentage and ranked third in the nation during October with 272 saves.

On May 27, 2011, Wayne State announced that it had discontinued the sponsorship of women's ice hockey, citing the state of Michigan's reductions in state appropriations to higher education. The university had previously discontinued its men's hockey program in 2008.

== Awards and honors ==
- Melissa Boal 2006 All-CHA First Team
- Melissa Boal 2006 CHA Scoring champion (tie)
- Melissa Boal, 2007–08 NCAA Leader, Points per game (2.16)
- Melissa Boal, Top Ten Finalist, 2008 Patty Kazmaier Award
- Lindsay DiPietro, 2007–08 NCAA Leader, Assists (40)
- Jim Fetter, 2006 CHA Coach of the Year
- Jim Fetter, 2008 CHA Coach of the Year
- Jim Fetter, 2008 AHCA Coach of the Year award
- Ashley King, Finalist, the 2008 John Wooden Citizen Cup
- Ashley King, finalist for the 2008 Hockey Humanitarian Award
- Lindsey Park was selected to participate in the 2010 Frozen Four Skills Competition to be held on April 4 at Ford Field.
- Sam Poyton 2006 All-CHA First Team
- Sam Poyton 2006 CHA Scoring champion (tie)
- Jessica Snelgrove, 2006 CHA Student-Athlete of the Year

=== CHA Player of the Week ===
- CHA Defensive Player of the Week, Chelsea Burnett (Week of Dec. 7, 2009)
- CHA Defensive Player of the Week, Chelsea Burnett (Week of March 1, 2010)
- CHA Defensive Player of the Week, Jill Szandzik (Week of Jan. 11, 2010)
- CHA Defensive Player of the Week, Delayne Brian (Week of Jan. 19, 2010)
- CHA Offensive Player of the Week, Katrina Protopapas (Week of Oct. 19, 2009)
- CHA Rookie of the Week, Gina Buquet (Week of Nov. 16, 2009)
- CHA Rookie of the Week, Julie Ingratta (Week of Jan. 18, 2010)
- 2009–10 CHA Student-Athlete of the Year – Christine Jefferson
- CHA Defensive Player of the Week, DeLayne Brian, (Week of Oct. 11, 2010)

=== Pre-Season All-CHA Team ===
- D – Chelsea Burnett, 2009–10

=== Second Team All-CHA ===
- Veronique Laramee-Paquette, Second Team All-CHA, 2009–10
- Jill Szandzik, Second Team All-CHA, 2009–10

=== CHA All-Rookie Team ===
- Jenaya Townend, Defense, 2009–10

== International ==
- Jim Fetter was selected as an assistant coach for Canada's National Women's Under-22 Team for 2009–10. Fetter will serve as an assistant to Margot Page, the former head coach at Niagara University. The 2009–10 season marks the second in a row for Jim Fetter with the National Women's Under-22 Team

=== Warriors in professional hockey ===
= CWHL All-Star	= NWHL All-Star	= Clarkson Cup Champion

Player	Position	Team(s)	League(s)	Years	Championships
Alyssa Baldin	Forward	Toronto Furies	CWHL	3	1 (2014)
Emily Berzins	Forward	Calgary Inferno	CWHL	3	
Melissa Boal	Forward	Toronto Furies	CWHL	1	
Delayne Brian	Goaltender	Calgary Inferno	CWHL	5	1 (2016)
Veronique Laramee-Paquette	Forward	Bracknell Queen Bees	WNIHL (UK)	1	
Kelly Zamora	Forward	Burlington Barracudas; Toronto Furies	CWHL	7	1 (2014)

== See also ==
- Wayne State Warriors men's ice hockey
