= 2008–09 Wayne State Warriors women's ice hockey season =

2008 CHA Women's Ice Hockey Tournament,
- Conference: CHA

Rankings
- USA Today/USA Hockey Magazine: TBD
- USCHO.com/CBS College Sports: TBD

Record
- Overall: 21–9–2
- Home: 10–4–0
- Road: 9–5–1
- Neutral: 2–0–1

Coaches and captains
- Head coach: Jim Fetter
- Assistant coaches: Nicolette Franck; Allison Rutledge
- Captain: Lindsay DiPietro
- Alternate captains: Christine Jefferson; Sam Poyton; Tina Vanderhoeven

The 2008–09 Wayne State Warriors women's ice hockey season head coach was Jim Fetter. Assisting Fetter was Nicolette Franck and Allison Rutledge. The equipment manager was Jim Campbell while the assistant athletic trainer was Katie Lang.

== Exhibition ==
Date	Opponent	Location	Time	Score
Fri. Sept. 26	Windsor	Detroit, Mich.	7:00 pm	13–3

== Regular season ==
- Delayne Brian made 22 saves in her collegiate debut on Oct. 3 against Bemidji State. She earned two wins Jan. 23–24 at Syracuse, totaling 56 saves including a season-high 34 in the second game.
- Lindsay DiPietro completed her Wayne State career as the program's all-time leader with 132 assists, sixth-most in NCAA history. She was also WSU's third all-time leading scorer with 188 points, third in goals (56), third in power play goals (18), and second in power play points (79).
  - She finished her career second in CHA points (92), third in CHA goals (27), and first in CHA assists (65).
- Alyssa Baldin tallied the game-winner and added a helper Oct. 24 versus Colgate. Baldin had a three-goal weekend Nov. 21–22 against Syracuse. She scored a power-play goal in each game of the Nutmeg Classic, including the game-winner Nov. 29 versus Quinnipiac, for another four-game point streak. At the Easton Holiday Showcase, she collected three power-play assists.
- Brandi Frakie made her season debut on Jan. 16–17 against Robert Morris after missing 31 straight games due to injury (dating back to the 2007–08 season). She scored her first goal of the year Feb. 14 against Niagara
- Christine Jefferson played in 31 games but missed the Nov. 15 contest against #10 Northeastern, snapping her career-long 77-game playing streak.

=== Roster ===
Number	Name	Position	Height	Class	Shoots
3	Janet Babchishin	Forward	5–6	SO/2L	Right
20	Alyssa Baldin	Forward	5–5	FR/1L	Right
27	Emily Berzins	Forward	5–5	SR/3L	Left
9	Melissa Boal	Forward	5–3	SR/4L	Left
1	Delayne Brian	Goalie	5–9	FR/1L	Left
4	Chelsea Burnett	Defense	5–5	JR/3L	Left
19	Lindsay DiPietro	Forward	5–5	SR/4L	Left
10	Marlee Fisher	Defense	5–7	FR/1L	Left
6	Brandi Frakie	Forward	5–5	JR/3L	Right
8	Micheline Frappier	Forward	5–5	FR/1L	Right
16	Amanda Hungle	Forward	5–5	SR/4L	Right
7	Christine Jefferson	Defense	5–6	JR/3L	Left
23	Bailey Lane	Def./For.	5–7	FR/1L	Left
17	Veronique Laramee-Paquette	Forward	5–8	FR/1L	Left
24	Ciara Lee	Defense	5–11	FR/1L	Right
30	Lindsey Park	Goalie	5–10 RS	JR/1L	Left
28	Natalie Payne	Defense	5–3	SR/1L	Left
26	Adrianna Pfeffer	Forward	5–7	SO/2L	Right
5	Sam Poyton	Forward	5–10	SR/4L	Left
15	Katrina Protopapas	Forward	5–6	JR/3L	Left
21	Becky Sonn	Forward	5–10 RS	SR/4L	Right
12	Jill Szandzik	Defense	5–8	FR/1L	Left
14	Tina Vanderhoeven	Defense	5–8	SR/4L	Right
31	Brittany Zeches	Goalie	5–2	FR/1L	Left

=== Schedule ===
- The Warriors participated in the Nutmeg Classic, which was held from November 28–29. In addition, the club participate in the Easton Holiday Showcase in St. Cloud, Minnesota from January 2–3.

Date	Opponent	Location	Score
Fri., Oct. 3	vs. Bemidji State	Detroit, Mich.	L, 3–2
Sat., Oct. 4	vs. Bemidji State	Detroit, Mich.	W, 2–1 (OT)
Fri., Oct. 17	at Union	Schenectady, N.Y.	T, 1–1 (OT)
Sat., Oct. 18	at Union	Schenectady, N.Y.	W, 6–2
Fri., Oct. 24	vs. Colgate	Detroit, Mich.	W, 6–2
Sat., Oct. 25	vs. Colgate	Detroit, Mich.	L, 3–2
Fri., Nov. 7	at Vermont	Burlington, Vt.	W, 5–3
Sat., Nov. 8	at Vermont	Burlington, Vt.	W, 7–0
Fri., Nov. 14	vs. #10 Northeastern	Detroit, Mich.	W, 4–3
Sat., Nov. 15	vs. #10 Northeastern	Detroit, Mich.	W, 3–2
Fri., Nov. 21	vs. Syracuse *	Detroit, Mich.	W, 5–3
Sat., Nov. 22	vs. Syracuse *	Detroit, Mich.	W, 5–2
Fri., Nov. 28	at Connecticut	Storrs, Conn.	L, 5–4
Sat., Nov. 29	vs. Quinnipiac	Storrs, Conn.	W, 3–2
Fri., Dec. 5	at Niagara *	Niagara, N.Y.	W, 5–3
Sat., Dec. 6	at Niagara *	Niagara, N.Y.	W, 4–2
Fri., Jan. 2	at St. Cloud State	St. Cloud, Minn.	W, 3–2
Sat., Jan. 3	vs. North Dakota	St. Cloud, Minn.	T, 3–3 (OT)
Fri., Jan. 16	vs. Robert Morris *	Detroit, Mich.	W, 5–0
Sat., Jan. 17	vs. Robert Morris *	Detroit, Mich.	W, 7–3
Fri., Jan. 23	at Syracuse *	Syracuse, N.Y.	W, 3–2
Sat., Jan. 24	at Syracuse *	Syracuse, N.Y.	W, 3–1
Fri., Jan. 30	at #5 Mercyhurst *	Erie, Pa.	L, 4–2
Sat., Jan. 31	at #5 Mercyhurst *	Erie, Pa.	L, 4–2
Fri., Feb. 13	vs. Niagara *	Detroit, Mich.	W, 5–1
Sat., Feb. 14	vs. Niagara *	Detroit, Mich.	W, 4–3
Fri., Feb. 20	at Robert Morris *	Moon Twp., Pa.	W, 4–2
Sat., Feb. 21	at Robert Morris *	Moon Twp., Pa.	L, 1–0
Fri., Feb. 27	vs. #3 Mercyhurst *	Detroit, Mich.	L, 4–3
Sat., Feb. 28	vs. #3 Mercyhurst *	Detroit, Mich.	L, 4–2

== Player stats ==
- Lindsay DiPietro collected five points on Dec. 5–6 at Niagara. She had two assists in the series opener and scored twice, including a short-handed and an empty net goal, with a power-play assist the next day. She posted her third straight multiple-point game Feb. 20 at Robert Morris and matched her career-best goal-scoring streak of six games. Overall, she led the Warriors with 17 multiple-point games
- Alyssa Baldin finished eighth among College Hockey America rookies with 18 points, seventh-most by any freshman in WSU women's hockey history
- Chelsea Burnett matched her career high with 19 points, and finished second in the conference behind teammate Natalie Payne in overall scoring by a defenseman.
- Micheline Frappier finished 14th among all rookies in College Hockey America with nine points.
- Veronique Laramee-Paquette finished sixth among rookies in College Hockey America with 20 points and tied for third with 10 conference points. In addition, she tied Katie Jones (2000–01) for fifth on WSU's all-time rookie points list. She collected three points Oct. 24–25 against Colgate, including a goal and a game-winning assist in the series opener. She posted her first career two-goal game Dec. 5 at Niagara.
- Jill Szandzik led all first-year defensemen in the conference with 16 points. She posted her second straight two-assist game Dec. 5 at Niagara and assisted on both game-winning goals in a sweep Jan. 16–17 over Robert Morris. In addition, Szandzik broke Chelsea Burnett's school record for more points in a season by a rookie blueliner and finished fourth on WSU's single season lists for points and assists (14) by a defenseman, as well as assists by a rookie.

=== Skaters ===
Number	Player	GP	Goals	Assists	Points	Shots	+/-	PIM
9	Melissa Boal	32	31	26	57	195	+26	28
19	Lindsay DiPietro	32	19	29	48	108	+23	34
5	Sam Poyton	32	23	22	45	107	+22	70
28	Natalie Payne	32	9	23	32	86	+19	40
17	V. Laramee-Paquette	32	10	10	20	73	−7	34
4	Chelsea Burnett	31	4	15	19	55	+3	18
20	Alyssa Baldin	26	9	9	18	53	+1	22
12	Jill Szandzik	32	2	14	16	45	+17	6
8	Micheline Frappier	26	3	6	9	43 0	22	
14	Tina Vanderhoeven	28	1	8	9	35	−6	40
15	Katrina Protopapas	32	1	7	8	39	−8	12
10	Marlee Fisher	30	0	4	4	12	−4	12
27	Emily Berzins	32	0	3	3	20	−4	38
6	Brandi Frakie	14	1	1	2	15	−5	2
16	Amanda Hungle	29	1	1	2	3	0	4
3	Janet Babchishin	32	0	2	2	28	−1	14
7	Christine Jefferson	31	0	2	2	26	+3	12
24	Ciara Lee	12	0	2	2	4	0	6
23	Bailey Lane	28	1	0	1	13	−2	8
1	Delayne Brian	21	0	0	0	0	0	2
26	Adrianna Pfeffer	20	0	0	0	3	−2	4
21	Becky Sonn	13	0	0	0	0	0	2

=== Goaltenders ===
- Delayne Brian finished her rookie season with a record of 15–6–0. She was two wins shy of Valery Turcotte's team record of 17 wins. She set a school record with a .714 winning percentage. Brian led College Hockey America with a .910 save percentage in conference action.
- Lindsey Park led College Hockey America with a .921 save percentage (third-best in school history) and finished second with a school-record 2.10 goals-against average She made 27 saves and surrendered just one power-play goal Oct. 4 for her first career victory.

Player	Games Played	Minutes	Goals Against	Wins	Losses	Ties	Shutouts	Save %	Goals Against Average
Delayne Brian	21	1214:04	55	15	6	0	1	.898	2.72
Lindsey Park	12	714:17	25	6	3	2	0	.921	2.10
Brittany Zeches	2	10:24	0	0	0	0	0	1.000	0.00

== Postseason ==
- College Hockey America Tournament

Date	Opponent	Location	Score
Fri., Mar. 6	vs. Robert Morris	Erie, Pa.	W, 4–3 (OT)
Sat., Mar. 7	at #3 Mercyhurst	Erie, Pa.	L, 6–1

== Awards and honors ==
- Alyssa Baldin, CHA Rookie of the Week (Oct. 20)
- Alyssa Baldin, CHA Rookie of the Week (Nov. 21)
- Delayne Brian, CHA Defensive Player of the Week honors (Jan. 26)
- Delayne Brian, CHA Defensive Player of the Week (Feb. 16) after making 53 saves while allowing only two even-strength goals in two wins Feb. 13–14 over Niagara
- Chelsea Burnett, All-College Hockey America Second Team for the second straight year
- Chelsea Burnett, CHA All-Academic Team (she was the first Academic All-American in the history of the WSU women's hockey program)
- Lindsay DiPietro, All-College Hockey America Second Team
- Lindsay DiPietro, CHA All-Academic Team (Third time in her career)
- Christine Jefferson, College Hockey America All-Academic Team
- Veronique Laramee-Paquette, CHA Rookie of the Week honors (Oct. 27)
- Veronique Laramee-Paquette, CHA Rookie of the Week honors (Dec. 5)
- Katrina Protopapas, College Hockey America All-Academic Team
- Jill Szandzik, College Hockey America All-Rookie Team

=== Team awards ===
- Lindsay DiPietro received the Warrior Award, the Captain's Award and the President's Award (highest GPA on the team) at the season-end banquet
