= Jessie Vetter =

American ice hockey player

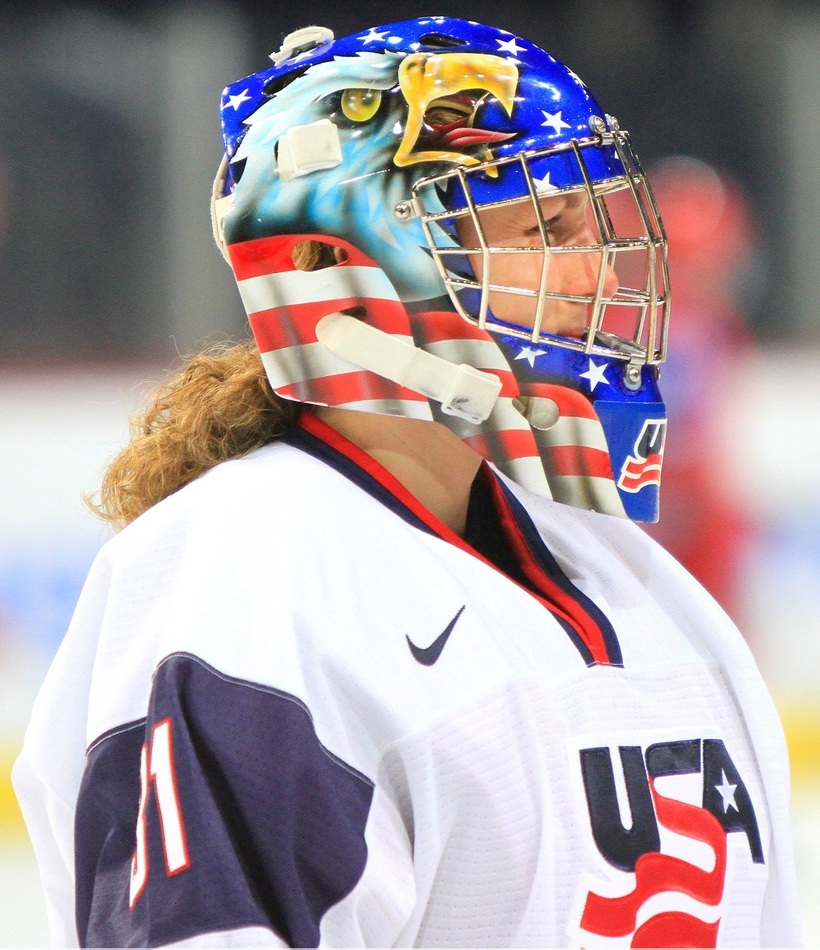
- Vetter with Team USA in 2011
- Born: December 19, 1985 (age 40) Cottage Grove, Wisconsin, U.S.
- Height: 5 ft 9 in (175 cm)
- Weight: 154 lb (70 kg; 11 st 0 lb)
- Position: Goaltender
- Caught: Left
- team Former teams: Minnesota Whitecaps; Wisconsin
- National team: United States
- Playing career: 2006–2017
Medal record
Olympic Games
Silver medal – second place	2010 Vancouver	Team
Silver medal – second place	2014 Sochi	Team
World Championships
Gold medal – first place	2008 China
Gold medal – first place	2009 Finland
Gold medal – first place	2011 Switzerland
Gold medal – first place	2013 Canada
Gold medal – first place	2015 Sweden
Gold medal – first place	2016 Canada
Silver medal – second place	2007 Canada
Silver medal – second place	2012 United States

Jessica Ann Vetter (born December 19, 1985) is an American former professional ice hockey goaltender and a member of the United States women's national ice hockey team. She was a member of the 2008–09 Wisconsin Badgers women's ice hockey team, which won an NCAA title. She was drafted 20th overall by the Boston Blades in the 2011 CWHL Draft.

== Playing career ==
Vetter played as a goaltender on the boys' ice hockey team at Monona Grove High School and won three state girls' soccer championships. While in high school, she was a four-time all-conference selection and a three-time all-state pick in soccer.

=== Wisconsin Badgers ===
In her four-year NCAA career, Vetter won an NCAA record 91 games (since broken by Hillary Pattenden) during her four-year career and posted an NCAA-record 39 career shutouts. She also held the record for most goalie shutouts in one season with 14 (accomplished in 2008–09), since broken by another Badger goaltender, Ann-Renée Desbiens.

In her senior year at Wisconsin, Vetter went 30–2–5 with a 1.33 GAA, (2nd NCAA) and 0.936 Save percentage, (2nd NCAA). She also finished second in the NCAA in minutes played with 2162:16. She is a 2009 WCHA first team honoree, an all-tournament honoree, and the WCHA Final Face-Off MVP as Wisconsin won the League championship and garnered the top seed going into the NCAA championships.

- In 2006, she became the first goalie to record a Frozen Four shutout when she notched two.
- In 2006–07, Vetter and Christine Dufour combined for 15 shutouts. Vetter was voted the top goalie and had a 1.24 goals-against average and a save percentage of .932.
- Vetter broke the NCAA single-season goals-against average record with a mark of 0.83 in 2006–07. As a result, that made her the first goalie in NCAA history to post a GAA below 1.00. In that same season, Vetter recorded a shutout streak that reached 448 minutes and 32 seconds – the longest not only in NCAA women's hockey history but also in men's history.
- Vetter won 31 games and had 13 shutouts during the 2008–09 season.
- She was the first ice hockey player to be named the Sportswoman of the Year by the Women's Sports Foundation.

== International career ==
At the 2009 Women's World Ice Hockey Championships, she allowed just a single goal. In addition, Vetter was the starting goaltender when the US won the 2008 Women's World Ice Hockey Championships. Vetter collected a silver medal at the 2010 Olympic Winter Games and fetched for the final tips by former NHL Goalie Mike Richter. In the gold medal game of the 2011 IIHF Women's World Championship against Canada, Vetter made 51 saves as the US won its third consecutive gold medal.

== Coaching career ==
In 2010–11, Vetter was an assistant coach for Madison (Wis.) Capitols 19-Under Tier I squad. Her squad played in the USA Hockey National Championships from April 6–10.

== Personal life ==
Vetter is a fan of her home state Green Bay Packers.

== Career statistics ==
Year	Team	Event	Result	GP	W	L	T/OT	MIN	GA	SO	GAA	SV%
2010	USA	OG	2nd place, silver medalist(s)	4	3	1	0	240:00	3	2	0.75	0.958
2014	USA	OG	2nd place, silver medalist(s)	4	2	2	0	239:50	8	0	1.95	0.907

== Jessie Vetter Award ==
The Jessie Vetter Award was introduced in 2010. It is awarded by Wisconsin Prep Hockey to the top female ice hockey goaltender in Wisconsin prep school. A list of winners includes:

Year	Winner	Team
2010	Hillary Drake	Central Wisconsin Storm
2011	Hillary Drake	Central Wisconsin Storm
2012	Julia Brueggen	Viroqua Co-op Blackhawks
2013	Mackenzie Torpy	Stoughton Co-op Icebergs
2014	Mackenzie Torpy	Stoughton Co-op Icebergs
2015	Mackenzie Torpy	Stoughton Co-op Icebergs
2016	Erin Connolly	Lakeshore Lightning
2017	Ana Holzbach	Bay Area Ice Bears
2018	Josie Mathison	Black River Falls Tigers
2019	Emma Quimby	Hayward Hurricanes
2020	Pistol Cowden	Wisconsin Valley Union
2021	Alesha Smith	Eau Claire Area Stars
2022	Chloe Lemke	Central Wisconsin Storm
2023	Anna Byczek	Bay Area Ice Bears

== Awards and honors ==
- WCHA Goalie of the Year (2007)
- All-WCHA First Team (2007)
- All-WCHA Academic Team (2007)
- NCAA Women's Frozen Four Most Outstanding Player (2006, 2009)
- WCHA Top 10 Players from the 2000s
- Patty Kazmaier Award
- Sportswoman of the Year at the Women's Sports Foundation's 30th Annual Salute to Women in Sports Awards Dinner: (Awarded Oct. 14, 2009)
- 2009 Bob Allen Women's Player of the Year Award
- On September 22, 2010, Vetter and Jinelle Zaugg-Siergiej threw out the ceremonial first pitch at Miller Park before the Milwaukee Brewers/Cincinnati Reds game.
- Most Valuable Player, 2011 4 Nations Cup

Awards and achievements
Preceded by Sarah Vaillancourt	Patty Kazmaier Award; 2008–09	Succeeded by Vicki Bendus
