= 2012–13 Clarkson Golden Knights women's ice hockey season =

NCAA Quarterfinals, L 3–5 vs. Boston University
- Conference: T–2nd ECAC
- Home ice: Cheel Arena

Rankings
- USCHO.com: #8
- USA Today/USA Hockey Magazine: #7

Record
- Overall: 28–10–0
- Home: 15–4–0
- Road: 13–5–0
- Neutral: 0–1–0

Coaches and captains
- Head coach: Shannon Desrosiers and Matt Desrosiers
- Assistant coaches: Matt Kelly
- Captain: Carly Mercer
- Alternate captain: Hailey Wood

The Clarkson Golden Knights women's ice hockey program represented Clarkson University during the 2012–13 NCAA Division I women's ice hockey season. The Golden Knights finished runners-up during the regular season in the ECAC to Cornell. They advanced to the semifinals of the ECAC tournament where they lost to Harvard Crimson. Their efforts were good enough to earn them an at-large bid to the NCAA tournament, where they lost to national runners-up Boston University in the quarterfinals.

== Offseason ==
=== Recruiting ===
Player	Position	Nationality	Notes
Erin Ambrose	Defense	Canada	Canadian Women’s U18 Team Member in 2009, 2010, 2011
Olivia Howe	Forward	Canada	Team captain of the Notre Dame AAA Hounds (SFMAAAHL)
Shannon MacAulay	Forward	Canada	Gold medallist 2012 World U18 Championships
Renata Fast	Defense	Canada	Also recruited by several NCAA schools for a soccer scholarship
Cayley Mercer	Forward	Canada	Member of the 2010 & 2011 Canadian Women’s U18 team

== Schedule ==
Date	Opponent^{#}	Rank^{#}	Site	Decision	Result	Record
Regular Season
September 29	Ottawa PWHL*		Cheel Arena • Potsdam, NY (exhibition)	Erica Howe	W 14–0	0–0–0
October 5	at #7 St. Lawrence*		Appleton Arena • Canton, NY	Erica Howe	W 1–0	1–0–0
October 6	#7 St. Lawrence*		Cheel Arena • Potsdam, NY	Erica Howe	W 3–2	2–0–0
October 12	Vermont*	#7	Cheel Arena • Potsdam, NY	Erica Howe	W 4–1	3–0–0
October 13	Vermont*	#7	Cheel Arena • Potsdam, NY	Emily Horn	W 5–1	4–0–0
October 19	at #7 Mercyhurst*	#5	Mercyhurst Ice Center • Erie, PA	Erica Howe	W 3–0	5–0–0
October 20	at #7 Mercyhurst*	#5	Mercyhurst Ice Center • Erie, PA	Erica Howe	L 3–4	5–1–0
October 26	Union	#4	Cheel Arena • Potsdam, NY	Erica Howe	W 6–0	6–1–0 (1–0–0)
October 27	RPI	#4	Cheel Arena • Potsdam, NY	Erica Howe	W 6–2	7–1–0 (2–0–0)
November 2	at #9 North Dakota*	#4	Ralph Engelstad Arena • Grand Forks, ND	Erica Howe	W 3–1	8–1–0
November 3	at #9 North Dakota*	#4	Ralph Engelstad Arena • Grand Forks, ND	Erica Howe	L 2–3	8–2–0
November 9	Yale	#3	Cheel Arena • Potsdam, NY	Erica Howe	W 4–1	9–2–0 (3–0–0)
November 10	Brown	#3	Cheel Arena • Potsdam, NY	Erica Howe	W 2–1	10–2–0 (4–0–0)
November 16	at Quinnipiac	#3	TD Bank Sports Center • Hamden, CT	Erica Howe	W 4–1	11–2–0 (5–0–0)
November 17	at Princeton	#3	Hobey Baker Memorial Rink • Princeton, NJ	Erica Howe	W 2–1 ^{OT}	12–2–0 (6–0–0)
November 30	#3 Cornell	#2	Cheel Arena • Potsdam, NY	Erica Howe	W 2–1	13–2–0 (7–0–0)
December 1	Colgate	#2	Cheel Arena • Potsdam, NY	Erica Howe	L 1–2	13–3–0 (7–1–0)
December 7	Syracuse*	#2	Cheel Arena • Potsdam, NY	Erica Howe	W 3–2	14–3–0
December 8	at Syracuse*	#2	Tennity Ice Skating Pavilion • Syracuse, NY	Erica Howe	W 5–4	15–3–0
January 3	#5 Boston College*	#2	Cheel Arena • Potsdam, NY	Erica Howe	L 1–5	15–4–0
January 4	#9 Northeastern*	#2	Cheel Arena • Potsdam, NY	Erica Howe	L 3–4	15–5–0
January 11	at Brown	#5	Meehan Auditorium • Providence, RI	Erica Howe	W 2–1	16–5–0 (8–1–0)
January 12	at Yale	#5	Ingalls Rink • New Haven, CT	Erica Howe	W 1–0	17–5–0 (9–1–0)
January 18	at Colgate	#6	Starr Arena • Hamilton, NY	Erica Howe	W 3–1	18–5–0 (10–1–0)
January 19	at #4 Cornell	#6	Lynah Rink • Ithaca, NY	Erica Howe	L 1–3	18–6–0 (10–2–0)
January 25	#2 Harvard	#7	Cheel Arena • Potsdam, NY	Erica Howe	W 3–1	19–6–0 (11–2–0)
January 26	Dartmouth	#7	Cheel Arena • Potsdam, NY	Erica Howe	W 5–0	20–6–0 (12–2–0)
February 1	St. Lawrence	#6	Cheel Arena • Potsdam, NY	Erica Howe	W 3–1	21–6–0 (13–2–0)
February 2	at St. Lawrence	#6	Appleton Arena • Canton, NY	Erica Howe	L 2–3	21–7–0 (13–3–0)
February 8	at RPI	#6	Houston Field House • Troy, NY	Erica Howe	W 3–1	22–7–0 (14–3–0)
February 9	at Union	#6	Achilles Rink • Schenectady, NY	Erica Howe	W 3–2	23–7–0 (15–3–0)
February 15	Princeton	#6	Cheel Arena • Potsdam, NY	Erica Howe	L 1–4	23–8–0 (15–4–0)
February 16	Quinnipiac	#6	Cheel Arena • Potsdam, NY	Erica Howe	W 1–0	24–8–0 (16–4–0)
February 22	at Dartmouth	#7	Thompson Arena • Hanover, NH	Erica Howe	W 3–1	25–8–0 (17–4–0)
February 23	at #5 Harvard	#7	Bright-Landry Hockey Center • Allston, MA	Erica Howe	W 3–1	26–8–0 (18–4–0)
ECAC Hockey Tournament
March 1	RPI*	#5	Cheel Arena • Potsdam, NY (Quarterfinals Game 1)	Erica Howe	W 3–2 ^{OT}	27–8–0
March 2	RPI*	#5	Cheel Arena • Potsdam, NY (Quarterfinals Game 2)	Erica Howe	W 5–2	28–8–0
March 9	vs. #7 Harvard*	#5	Lynah Rink • Ithaca, NY (Semifinals)	Erica Howe	L 2–4	28–9–0
NCAA Tournament
March 16	at #3 Boston University*	#6	Walter Brown Arena • Boston, MA (Quarterfinals)	Erica Howe	L 3–5	28–10–0
*Non-conference game. ^{#}Rankings from USCHO.com Poll.

== Standings ==
#	Team	ECAC record								Overall						
#	Team	PTS	GP	W	L	T	Pct	GF	GA	GP	W	L	T	Pct	GF	GA
1	Cornell	37	22	18	3	1	0.841	84	27	34	27	6	1	0.809	131	55
2t	Clarkson	36	22	18	4	0	0.818	61	28	38	28	10	0	0.737	110	68
2t	Harvard	36	22	17	3	2	0.818	77	25	34	24	7	3	0.750	113	41
4	Quinnipiac	29	22	13	6	3	0.659	66	41	36	20	12	4	0.611	103	75
5	St. Lawrence	28	22	12	6	4	0.636	65	54	38	19	14	5	0.566	98	92
6	Dartmouth	26	22	11	7	4	0.591	58	49	31	16	10	5	0.597	84	71
7	Rensselaer	18	22	8	12	2	0.409	48	59	36	10	22	4	0.333	76	99
8	Colgate	15	22	6	13	3	0.341	40	70	35	11	21	3	0.357	66	122
9	Princeton	14	22	6	14	2	0.318	46	75	29	11	16	2	0.414	66	90
10	Yale	11	22	4	15	3	0.250	35	64	29	5	21	3	0.224	41	88
11	Brown	10	22	5	17	0	0.227	31	61	27	6	20	1	0.241	42	76
12	Union	4	22	0	18	4	0.091	15	73	34	7	23	4	0.265	41	105

Source: ecachockey.com

== Awards and honors ==
- Erin Ambrose – ECAC Hockey Rookie of the Year, ECAC Hockey Second Team All-Star, ECAC Hockey All-Rookie Team, ECAC Hockey Rookie of the Month (October, December, February), ECAC Hockey Rookie of the Week (10/23, 10/30, 2/12), ECAC Hockey weekly Honor Roll (10/9, 12/11, 1/14, 1/21, 2/18)
- Renata Fast – ECAC Hockey weekly Honor Roll (11/20, 2/4)
- Emily Horn – ECAC Hockey weekly Honor Roll (10/16)
- Erica Howe – ECAC Hockey Goaltender of the Year, ECAC Hockey First Team All-Star, ECAC Hockey Goaltender of the Month (October, November), ECAC Hockey Goaltender of the Week (10/9, 11/5, 11/20, 1/14, 1/28, 2/25), ECAC Hockey weekly Honor Roll (10/23, 10/30, 11/13, 12/3, 12/11, 1/21, 2/4, 2/12, 2/18)
- Shannon MacAulay – ECAC Hockey Rookie of the Week (10/16, 11/13), ECAC Hockey weekly Honor Roll (12/3, 1/28)
- Carly Mercer – ECAC Hockey Third Team All-Star, ECAC Hockey Player of the Week (1/28), ECAC Hockey weekly Honor Roll (10/23, 11/13, 12/11, 2/18)
- Olivia Howe – ECAC Hockey weekly Honor Roll (11/5, 2/25)
- Vanessa Plante – ECAC Hockey weekly Honor Roll (11/5)
- Jamie Lee Rattray – ECAC Hockey Second Team All-Star, ECAC Hockey Player of the Week (10/23), ECAC Hockey weekly Honor Roll (10/16, 11/20, 2/25)
- Danielle Skirrow – ECAC Hockey weekly Honor Roll (10/9, 1/21, 2/12)
- Brittany Styner – ECAC Hockey weekly Honor Roll (1/14, 2/4)
