= 2012–13 Princeton Tigers women's ice hockey season =

- Conference: ECAC Hockey

Rankings
- USA Today/USA Hockey Magazine: Not ranked
- USCHO.com/CBS College Sports: Not ranked

Record

Coaches and captains
- Head coach: Jeff Kampersal
- Assistant coaches: Lee-J Mirasolo; Cara Morey

The Princeton Tigers represented Princeton University in ECAC women's ice hockey.

== Offseason ==
=== Recruiting ===
Player	Nationality	Position	Notes
Molly Contini	Canada	Forward	Played for Kitchener-Waterloo Rangers
Karen MacDonald	Canada	Defense	Competed with the Ottawa Senators (PWHL)
Jaimie McDonell	Canada	Forward	Member of the Toronto Jr. Aeros
Kimberly Newell	Canada	Goaltender	Played for the Kootenay Ice
Maddie Peake	United States	Forward	Hails from Shoreview, Minnesota
Cristin Shanahan	Canada	Forward	Also competed with Ottawa Senators (PWHL)

== Regular season ==
=== Standings ===
#	Team	ECAC record								Overall						
#	Team	PTS	GP	W	L	T	Pct	GF	GA	GP	W	L	T	Pct	GF	GA
1	Cornell	37	22	18	3	1	0.841	84	27	34	27	6	1	0.809	131	55
2t	Clarkson	36	22	18	4	0	0.818	61	28	38	28	10	0	0.737	110	68
2t	Harvard	36	22	17	3	2	0.818	77	25	34	24	7	3	0.750	113	41
4	Quinnipiac	29	22	13	6	3	0.659	66	41	36	20	12	4	0.611	103	75
5	St. Lawrence	28	22	12	6	4	0.636	65	54	38	19	14	5	0.566	98	92
6	Dartmouth	26	22	11	7	4	0.591	58	49	31	16	10	5	0.597	84	71
7	Rensselaer	18	22	8	12	2	0.409	48	59	36	10	22	4	0.333	76	99
8	Colgate	15	22	6	13	3	0.341	40	70	35	11	21	3	0.357	66	122
9	Princeton	14	22	6	14	2	0.318	46	75	29	11	16	2	0.414	66	90
10	Yale	11	22	4	15	3	0.250	35	64	29	5	21	3	0.224	41	88
11	Brown	10	22	5	17	0	0.227	31	61	27	6	20	1	0.241	42	76
12	Union	4	22	0	18	4	0.091	15	73	34	7	23	4	0.265	41	105

Source: ecachockey.com

=== Schedule ===
Date	Opponent	Site	Result	Record
Regular Season
October 19	at Rochester Institute of Technology*	Frank Ritter Memorial Ice Arena • Rochester, NY	W 2-1	1-0-0
October 20	at Robert Morris*	Robert Morris University Island Sports Center • Moon Township, PA	W 6-3	2-0-0
October 26	Dartmouth	Hobey Baker Rink • Princeton, NJ	L 1-3	2-1-0 (0-1-0)
October 27	#9 Harvard	Hobey Baker Rink • Princeton, NJ	L 1-9	2-2-0 (0-2-0)
November 2	at #2 Cornell	Lynah Rink • Ithaca, NY	L 0-4	2-3-0 (0-3-0)
November 3	at Colgate	Starr Rink • Hamilton, NY	T 3-3	2-3-1 (0-3-1)
November 9	at Rensselaer	Houston Field House • Troy, NY	W 6-5	3-3-1 (1-3-1)
November 10	at Union	Achilles Rink • Schenectady, NY	T 1-1	3-3-2 (1-3-2)
November 16	St. Lawrence	Hobey Baker Rink • Princeton, NJ	L 2-6	3-4-2 (1-4-2)
November 17	#3 Clarkson	Hobey Baker Rink • Princeton, NJ	L 1-2	3-5-2 (1-5-2)
November 23	#8 Ohio State*	Hobey Baker Rink • Princeton, NJ	L 2-4	3-6-2 (1-5-2)
November 24	#8 Ohio State*	Hobey Baker Rink • Princeton, NJ	W 2-1	4-6-2 (1-5-2)
November 30	Union	Hobey Baker Rink • Princeton, NJ	W 3-0	5-6-2 (2-5-2)
December 1	Rensselaer	Hobey Baker Rink • Princeton, NJ	L 3-4	5-7-2 (2-6-2)
December 7	Quinnipiac	Hobey Baker Rink • Princeton, NJ	L 2-3	5-8-2 (2-7-2)
December 8	at Quinnipiac	M&T Bank Arena • Hamden, CT	L 0-4	5-9-2 (2-8-2)
January 2	at Connecticut*	Freitas Arena • Storrs, CT	L 1-5	5-10-2 (2-8-2)
January 3	at Connecticut*	Freitas Arena • Storrs, CT	W 4-1	6-10-2 (2-8-2)
January 11	at Harvard	Bright-Landry Hockey Center • Cambridge, MA	L 0-3	6-11-2 (2-9-2)
January 12	at Dartmouth	Thompson Arena • Hanover, NH	L 2-6	6-12-2 (2-10-2)
January 29	at Penn State*	Pegula Ice Arena • University Park, PA	W 3-0	7-12-2 (2-10-2)
February 1	Yale	Hobey Baker Rink • Princeton, NJ	W 3-1	8-12-2 (3-10-2)
February 2	Brown	Hobey Baker Park • Princeton, NJ	W 6-1	9-12-2 (4-10-2)
February 8	Colgate	Hobey Baker Park • Princeton, NJ	L 1-6	9-13-2 (4-11-2)
February 9	#4 Cornell	Hobey Baker Park • Princeton, NJ (Skate with the Tigers)	L 1-4	9-14-2 (4-12-2)
February 15	at #4 Clarkson	Cheel Arena • Potsdam, NY	W 4-1	10-14-2 (5-12-2)
February 16	at St. Lawrence	Appleton Arena • Canton, NY	L 2-4	10-15-2 (5-13-2)
February 22	at Brown	George V. Meehan Auditorium • Providence, RI	W 2-1	11-15-2 (6-13-2)
February 23	at Yale	David S. Ingalls Rink • New Haven, CT	L 2-1	11-16-2 (6-14-2)
*Non-conference game. ^{#}Rankings from USCHO.com Poll.

Source: Princeton University Athletics

== Roster ==
Number	Player	Position	Height	Shoots
1	Katie Jones	Goaltender	5-3	Left
2	Kelly Cooke	Forward	5-1	Left
3	Ali Pankowski	Defense	5-10	Right
4	Corey Stearns	Forward	5-8	Left
6	Maddie Peake	Forward	5-9	Left
7	Jaimie McDonell	Forward	5-8	Right
9	Molly Contini	Forward	5-8	Left
10	Sally Butler	Forward	5-9	Right
12	Alex Kinney	Forward	5-9	Right
14	Denna Laing	Forward	5-9	Right
15	Brianna Leahy	Forward	5-7	Left
16	Karen MacDonald	Defense	5-8	Left
17	Brianne Mahoney	Defense	5-7	Right
19	Cristin Shanahan	Forward	5-8	Left
21	Gabby Figueroa	Defense	5-6	Left
22	Olivia Mucha	Forward	5-5	Left
25	Rose Alleva	Defense	5-3	Right
30	Ashley Holt	Goaltender	5-6	Left
33	Kimberley Newell	Goaltender	5-9	Left

Source: Princeton University Athletics
