= 2025–26 Clarkson Golden Knights women's ice hockey season =

NCAA Division I women's hockey season

- Conference: ECAC
- Home ice: Cheel Arena

Rankings
- USA Today: #9
- USCHO.com: #9

Record
- Overall: 6–3–0
- Conference: 3–0–0
- Home: 2–1–0
- Road: 4–2–0

Coaches and captains
- Head coach: Matt Desrosiers
- Assistant coaches: Cassidy Warner; Kris Hogg; Cam Basarab
- Captain: Sena Catterall
- Alternate captain: Keira Hurry

The 2025–26 Clarkson Golden Knights women's ice hockey season will represent Clarkson University during the 2025–26 NCAA Division I women's ice hockey season. The team is coached by Matt Desrosiers in his 17th season.

== Offseason ==
=== Recruiting ===
Player	Position	Class	Previous school
Lara Beecher	Forward	Senior	Vermont
Jaela Carter	Defense	Incoming freshman	
Janelle Evans	Forward	Junior	Robert Morris
Reese Logan	Forward	Sophomore	Minnesota Duluth
Gabrielle Lalonde	Forward	Incoming freshman	
Arianne Leblanc	Goaltender	Junior	Concordia
Manon le Scodan	Forward	Incoming freshman	
Kate Manness	Defense	Incoming freshman	
Sara Manness	Forward	Incoming freshman	
Layla Matthew	Forward	Incoming freshman	
Megan McKay	Defense	Senior	Mercyhurst
Aneta Šenková	Goaltender	Incoming freshman	
Andrea Trnková	Defense	Junior	RPI
Sidney Ullmann	Defense	Incoming freshman	
Paige Wallace	Forward	Incoming freshman	
Morgan Walton	Forward	Incoming freshman	

=== Departures ===
Player	Position	Class	Destination
Gretchen Branton	Forward	Graduated	
Anne Cherkowski	Forward	New York Sirens	
Adreanna Doucette	Goaltender	Sophomore	Merrimack
Sidney Fess	Defense	Graduated	
Caroline Goffredo	Forward	Graduated	
Jenna Goodwin	Forward	Graduated	
Nicole Gosling	Defense	Montreal Victoire	
Hayley Kelleher	Forward	Sophomore	Union
Baylee Kirwan	Forward	Graduated	
Jessica MacKinnon	Forward	Sophomore	Robert Morris
Alexa Madrid	Goaltender	Graduated	
Kirstyn McQuigge	Forward	Graduated	
Julia Minotti	Goaltender	Senior	St. Thomas
Kami O'Brien	Forward	Sophomore	RPI
Andie Proulx	Defense	Graduated	
Taylor Storey	Forward	Junior	Robert Morris
Haley Winn	Defense	Boston Fleet	

=== PWHL Draft ===
Round	Player	Position	Team
1	Haley Winn	Defense	Boston Fleet
1	Nicole Gosling	Defense	Montreal Victoire
2	Anne Cherkowski	Forward	New York Sirens

== Standings ==
2025–26 ECAC Hockey standings
	Conference							Overall					
	GP	W	L	T	PTS	GF	GA	GP	W	L	T	GF	GA
#8 Yale †	22	16	6	0	46	78	49	36	26	10	0	126	76
#9 Princeton †	22	16	6	0	46	68	37	34	23	11	0	106	57
#7 Quinnipiac *	22	14	6	2	45	69	30	41	29	9	3	137	68
#11 Cornell	22	14	7	1	42.5	70	42	33	20	11	2	101	67
#15 Clarkson	22	13	7	2	40	69	50	35	20	12	3	210	75
#14 Colgate	22	13	8	1	39.5	65	57	36	19	16	1	103	100
Brown	22	12	8	2	39	62	50	34	18	14	2	93	82
Harvard	22	8	11	3	28.5	38	50	34	16	15	3	70	72
St. Lawrence	22	8	13	1	27.5	44	57	35	11	21	3	65	88
Dartmouth	22	3	16	3	16.5	19	61	31	5	23	3	40	88
RPI	22	4	18	0	14	40	96	35	7	28	0	60	134
Union	22	3	18	1	11.5	40	83	36	11	22	3	79	114
Championship: March 7, 2026 † indicates conference regular season champion; * indicates conference tournament champion Rankings: USCHO.com; updated March 20, 2026

== Schedule ==
Date	Time	Opponent^{#}	Rank^{#}	Site	Decision	Result	Attendance	Record	Ref
Regular Season
September 26	6:00	at Merrimack*	#7	Lawler Rink • North Andover, MA	Gruber	W 6–3	257	1–0–0	
September 27	4:00	at Merrimack*	#7	Lawler Rink • North Andover, MA	Šenková	L 3–5	277	1–1–0	
October 3	6:00	#12 Connecticut*	#9	Cheel Arena • Potsdam, NY	Gruber	W 2–0	709	2–1–0	
October 4	2:00	#12 Connecticut*	#9	Cheel Arena • Potsdam, NY	Gruber	L 2–3	648	2–2–0	
October 17	11:00	at Providence*	#9	Schneider Arena • Providence, RI	Gruber	L 1–2	927	2–3–0	
October 18	1:00	at Providence*	#9	Schneider Arena • Providence, RI	Leblanc	W 3–0	366	3–3–0	
October 24	6:00	at Union	#10	M&T Bank Center • Schenectady, NY	Gruber	W 5–2	282	4–3–0 (1–0–0)	
October 25	3:00	at RPI	#10	Houston Field House • Troy, NY	Leblanc	W 7–1	1,611	5–3–0 (2–0–0)	
October 31	3:00	Harvard	#9	Cheel Arena • Potsdam, NY	Gruber	W 2–1	312	6–3–0 (3–0–0)	
November 1	3:00	Dartmouth	#9	Cheel Arena • Potsdam, NY	Leblanc	L 0–3	831	6–4–0 (3–1–0)	
November 7	6:00	at Princeton	#11	Hobey Baker Rink • Princeton, NJ	Gruber	L 0–1 ^{OT}	535	6–5–0 (3–2–0)	
November 8	3:00	at #7 Quinnipiac	#11	M&T Bank Arena • Hamden, CT	Gruber	T 0–0 ^{SOW}	581	6–5–1 (3–2–1)	
November 12	11:00	St. Lawrence	#12	Cheel Arena • Potsdam, NY	Gruber	W 6–1	2,867	7–5–1 (4–2–1)	
November 21	6:00	#12 Brown	#11	Cheel Arena • Potsdam, NY	Gruber	W 4–2	647	8–5–1 (5–2–1)	
November 22	3:00	#14 Yale	#11	Cheel Arena • Potsdam, NY	Gruber	W 3–2	663	9–5–1 (6–2–1)	
November 28	4:00	vs. #2 Ohio State*	#10	MedStar Capitals Iceplex • Washington, DC (D1 in DC)	Gruber	L 0–8	882	9–6–1	
November 29	1:00	vs. #14 St. Cloud State*	#10	MedStar Capitals Iceplex • Washington, DC (D1 in DC)	Leblanc	W 2–0	974	10–6–1	
December 4	7:00	at St. Lawrence	#10	Appleton Arena • Canton, NY	Leblanc	T 1–1 ^{SOW}	647	10–6–2 (6–2–2)	
December 6	2:00	St. Lawrence	#10	Cheel Arena • Potsdam, NY	Gruber	W 4–3 ^{OT}	X	11–6–2 (7–2–2)	
January 2	6:00	St. Michael's*	#11	Cheel Arena • Potsdam, NY	Gruber	W 15–0	292	12–6–2	
January 3	2:00	St. Michael's*	#11	Cheel Arena • Potsdam, NY	Šenková	W 9–0	274	13–6–2	
January 9	3:00	at #10 Cornell	#11	Lynah Rink • Ithaca, NY	Gruber	T 5–5 ^{SOL}	400	13–6–3 (7–2–3)	
January 10	3:00	at #13 Colgate	#11	Class of 1965 Arena • Hamilton, NY	Gruber	L 2–5	671	13–7–3 (7–3–3)	
January 16	6:00	RPI	#11	Cheel Arena • Potsdam, NY	Šenková	W 7–1	402	14–7–3 (8–3–3)	
January 17	3:00	Union	#11	Cheel Arena • Potsdam, NY	Leblanc	W 5–1	437	15–7–3 (9–3–3)	
January 20	6:00	at St. Lawrence	#11	Appleton Arena • Canton, NY	Šenková	W 5–0	589	16–7–3 (10–3–3)	
January 23	6:00	at Dartmouth	#11	Thompson Arena • Hanover, NH	Leblanc	W 2–1 ^{OT}	944	17–7–3 (11–3–3)	
January 24	3:00	at Harvard		Bright-Landry Hockey Center • Cambridge, MA					
January 30	3:00	Quinnipiac		Cheel Arena • Potsdam, NY					
January 31	2:00	Princeton		Cheel Arena • Potsdam, NY					
February 6	6:00	at Yale		Ingalls Rink • New Haven, CT					
February 7	3:00	at Brown		Meehan Auditorium • Providence, RI					
February 13	6:00	Colgate		Cheel Arena • Potsdam, NY					
February 14	3:00	Cornell		Cheel Arena • Potsdam, NY					
*Non-conference game. ^{#}Rankings from USCHO.com Poll.

== Roster ==
As of September 26, 2025.

No.	Nat.	Player	Class	Pos	Height	DoB	Hometown	Previous team
2	(United States)	Paige Wallace	Freshman	F	5' 5" (1.65 m)	2006-12-21	Huntington, New York	Bishop Kearney Selects
3	(Canada)	Keira Hurry (A)	Junior	D	5' 9" (1.75 m)	2005-03-07	London, Ontario	London Jr. Devilettes
4	(United States)	Morgan Walton	Freshman	D	5' 6" (1.68 m)	2006-03-01	Geneseo, New York	Bishop Kearney Selects
6	(United States)	Megan McKay	Senior	D	5' 10" (1.78 m)	2003-06-20	Zionsville, Indiana	Mercyhurst
7	(Canada)	Jaela Carter	Freshman	D	5' 6" (1.68 m)	2007-04-24	Niagara Falls, Ontario	Burlington Barracudas AA
8	(Canada)	Bridget Stevenson	Junior (RS)	F	5' 6" (1.68 m)	2004-00-00	Woodstock, Ontario	London Jr. Devilettes
9	(Canada)	Rhea Hicks	Senior	F	5' 5" (1.65 m)	2004-10-04	Etobicoke, Ontario	Syracuse
10	(United States)	Lara Beecher	Senior	F	5' 5" (1.65 m)	2004-11-10	Buffalo, New York	Vermont
11	(Canada)	Kaitlyn Mallette	Freshman	D	5' 10" (1.78 m)	2007-07-24	Kelowna, British Columbia	Rink Hockey Academy Kelowna
12	(Canada)	Sidney Ullmann	Freshman	D	5' 7" (1.7 m)	2005-06-16	Dorval, Quebec	John Abbott College
13	(Czech Republic)	Andrea Trnková	Junior	D	5' 9" (1.75 m)	2002-03-03	Ustí nad Orlicí, Czechia	RPI
14	(Canada)	Gabrielle Lalonde	Freshman	F	5' 6" (1.68 m)	2005-01-30	Pointe-Claire, Quebec	John Abbott College
15	(United States)	Greta Brezenski	Sophomore	F	5' 5" (1.65 m)	2005-09-29	Waunakee, Wisconsin	Bishop Kearney Selects
16	(Canada)	Layla Matthew	Freshman	F	5' 7" (1.7 m)	2007-03-11	Edmonton, Alberta	Edmonton Jr. Oilers
17	(Canada)	Janelle Evans	Junior	F	5' 4" (1.63 m)	2005-02-17	Bethune, Saskatchewan	Robert Morris
18	(Canada)	Raedyn Spademan	Sophomore	F	5' 6" (1.68 m)	2006-06-20	Cochrane, Alberta	Rink Hockey Academy Kelowna
19	(United States)	Caroline Aufiero	Junior	D	5' 3" (1.6 m)	2005-07-27	Belmont, Massachusetts	East Coast Wizards 19U
20	(Canada)	Jenna Smellie	Sophomore	F	5' 6" (1.68 m)	2006-01-23	Whitby, Ontario	Etobicoke Dolphins
21	(France)	Manon le Scodan	Freshman	F	5' 7" (1.7 m)	2004-12-25	Sallanches, France	John Abbott College
22	(Canada)	Reese Logan	Sophomore	F	5' 8" (1.73 m)	2006-03-05	Burlington, Ontario	Minnesota Duluth
24	(Canada)	Kate Manness	Freshman	D	5' 5" (1.65 m)	2007-09-26	Winnipeg, Manitoba	Burlington Barracudas AA
25	(Canada)	Sena Catterall (C)	Senior	F	5' 5" (1.65 m)	2001-00-00	Montreal, Quebec	John Abbott College
26	(Canada)	Sara Manness	Freshman	F	5' 9" (1.75 m)	2007-09-26	Winnipeg, Manitoba	Burlington Barracudas AA
27	(Canada)	Madiosn Chantler	Senior	F	5' 5" (1.65 m)	2004-11-30	London, Ontario	Quinnipiac
28	(Canada)	Shelby Laidlaw	Junior	F	5' 8" (1.73 m)	2005-12-07	Aylmer, Ontario	London Jr Devilettes
29	(Canada)	Arianne Leblanc	Junior	G	5' 9" (1.75 m)	2005-03-18	Repentigny, Quebec	Concordia
31	(Czech Republic)	Aneta Šenková	Freshman	G	5' 6" (1.68 m)	2006-06-24	Lovosice, Czechia	Kingston Jr Ice Wolves
35	(United States)	Holly Gruber	Graduate	G	5' 7" (1.7 m)	2002-05-24	Stevens Point, Wisconsin	Minnesota Duluth
