= Haley Winn =

American ice hockey player (born 2003)

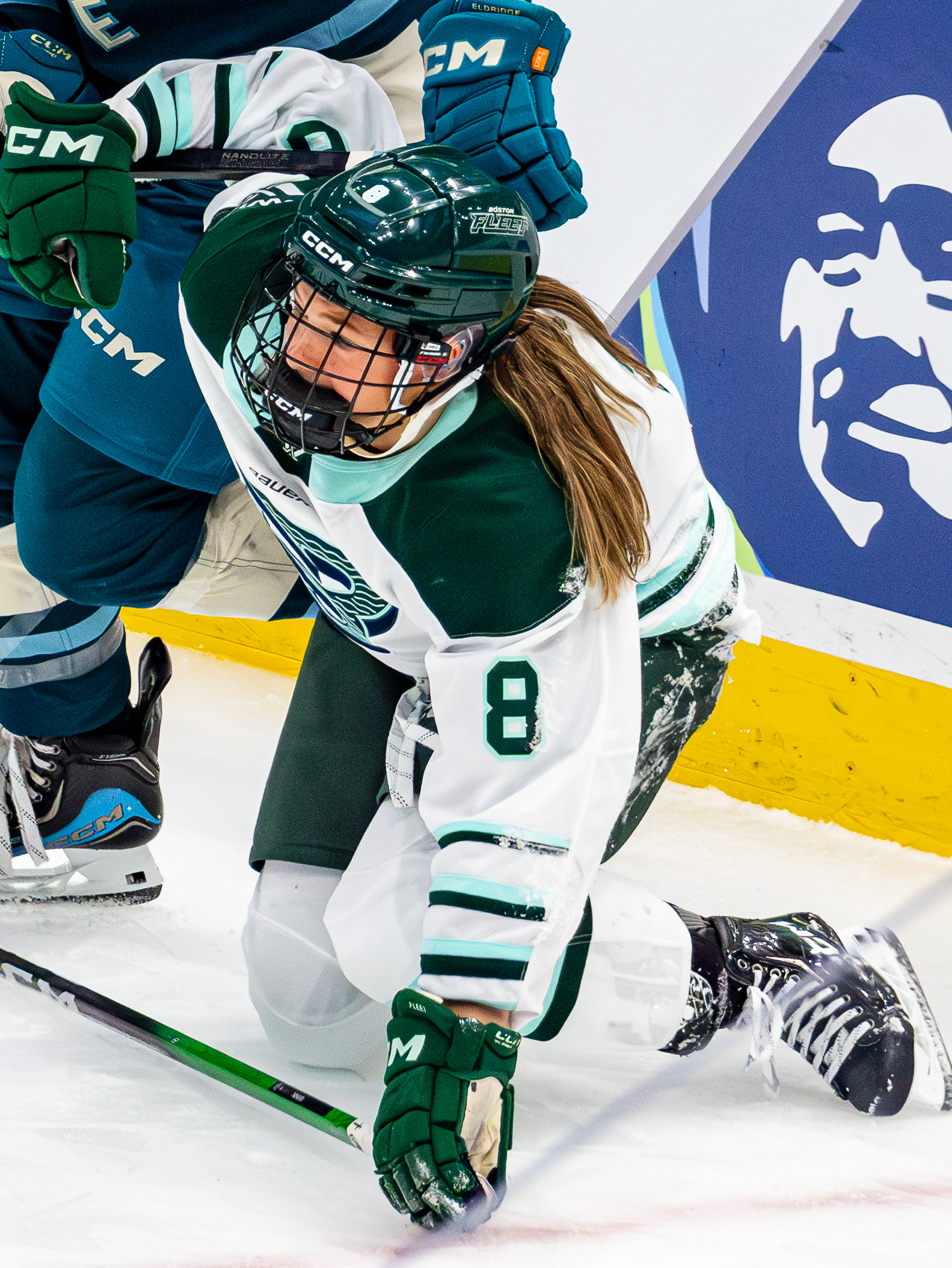
- Winn with the Boston Fleet in 2026
- Born: July 14, 2003 (age 23) Rochester, New York, U.S.
- Height: 5 ft 5 in (165 cm)
- Weight: 145 lb (66 kg; 10 st 5 lb)
- Position: Defender
- Shoots: Right
- PWHL team: Boston Fleet
- National team: United States
- Playing career: 2021–present
Medal record
Olympic Games
Gold medal – first place	2026 Milano Cortina	Team
World Championship
Gold medal – first place	2023 Canada
Gold medal – first place	2025 Czechia
Gold medal – first place	2026 Denmark
Silver medal – second place	2024 United States
World U18 Championship
Gold medal – first place	2020 Slovakia
Silver medal – second place	2019 Japan

Haley Maris Winn (born July 14, 2003) is an American professional ice hockey player who is a defender for the Boston Fleet of the Professional Women's Hockey League (PWHL) and member of the United States women's national ice hockey team. A three-time World Champion with the United States, Winn won gold medals at the 2023 and 2025 World Championships and a silver medal at the 2024 tournament. She also competed at the 2019 and 2020 U18 World Championships, winning silver and gold respectively.

Winn played college ice hockey at Clarkson University from 2021 to 2025, where she became one of the top defensemen in NCAA Division I. In her senior season, she was named ECAC Hockey Player of the Year and Defender of the Year, earning First Team All-American honors and recognition as a top-10 finalist for the Patty Kazmaier Award. She finished her collegiate career with 130 points (37 goals, 93 assists) in 151 games, ranking second all-time among Clarkson defensemen in career points, seven behind PWHL star Erin Ambrose.

Winn was selected second overall by the Boston Fleet in the 2025 PWHL Draft, and named the 2026 PWHL Rookie of the Year.

== Early life ==
Born in Rochester, New York to Janet and Mike Winn, Haley was raised with her three older brothers—Casey, Ryan, and Tommy—all of whom played college ice hockey. All her three older brothers became defensemen. Winn's introduction to hockey began before she could walk. Her parents recall watching her crawl to the laundry room drying rack and put on the hockey pads and jerseys of her older brothers "like dress-up." By age two, Haley was wearing skates and pushing a bucket for support on the backyard rink her father built at the family's homestead in Williamson, New York, about 30 minutes east of Rochester. A year or two later, she began playing games with and against her brothers, who were seven, six, and three years older than her, respectively. Winn later recalled watching home videos showing "several scenes where I was getting cross-checked into a snow bank" while playing with her brothers.

Winn originally played as a forward but transitioned to defense after a game in Buffalo, New York. "There was a game in Buffalo against this really fast-skating team when she came racing back from the front line and swiped the puck away from this kid who was zooming toward our goal," her mother Janet recalled. The transition showcased her natural skating ability and defensive instincts. Winn benefited from coaching by knowledgeable hockey coaches, including a stint playing for Rochester Americans Hall-of-Famer Scott Nichol. "She had the good fortune to skate for some really knowledgeable hockey coaches, who knew the game inside and out, and who welcomed her as the only girl on the team," her father said. "They really nurtured her love of the game and admired her competitiveness and drive."

Winn attended Selects Academy at Bishop Kearney for four seasons. She joined the Bishop Kearney Selects program, where she flourished. While at the Academy, she roomed with players from 18 different states and two foreign countries.

== Playing career ==
=== College ===
Winn began her college ice hockey for the Clarkson Golden Knights during the 2021–22 season. She made her collegiate debut on September 24, 2021, in a 6–1 victory against Sacred Heart, recording a goal and an assist in the first period. Winn finished her freshman season with seven goals and 16 assists for 23 points in 37 games, ranking fifth on the team in scoring. She led the team in ice time and recorded two game-winning goals. In November 2021, she was named ECAC Hockey Rookie of the Month after recording seven assists in eight games. She recorded a two-goal game against Brown on February 12, 2022. Following the season, Winn was named Clarkson Rookie of the Year and Sword Award winner. She was also selected to the ECAC All-Academic Team and named a Krampade Academic All-American. During her freshman year, Winn made headlines for her exceptional work ethic, logging over 35,000 practice shots on a RapidShot training machine—a number that stunned even the manufacturer's representatives.

During the 2022–23 season, in her sophomore year, she recorded six goals and 17 assists in 38 games. She posted a team-leading +20 plus-minus rating, tops among defensemen. Winn recorded two goals against Maine on November 26, 2022, and tallied one goal and three assists against Union on January 14, 2023. She was named to the ECAC All-Academic Team. During the 2023–24 season, in her junior year, she recorded 10 goals and 29 assists in 38 games, tying for the team lead in scoring, and emerged as one of the top defensemen in the nation. Twelve of her 29 assists came on teammate Nicole Gosling's 14 goals. She posted a +23 plus-minus rating and scored four power-play goals. Following the season, she was named an All-ECAC Second Team All-Star, Second Team All-USCHO, and Second Team All-American. She was also selected to the College Sports Communicator Academic All-District At-Large team, named ECAC All-Academic, and earned AHCA Academic All-American honors.

During the 2024–25 season, in her senior year, she served as co-captain alongside Nicole Gosling. She recorded career-highs with 14 goals and 32 assists 38 games, ranking second among NCAA defensemen in scoring behind only Wisconsin's Caroline Harvey. She ranked eighth in the nation in assists. With her performance, she surpassed PWHL star Erin Ambrose to rank second in career points by a defenseman in Clarkson history. Following the season she was named an All-ECAC First Team selection and won both ECAC Hockey Player of the Year and Defender of the Year. She was also named a top-10 finalist for the Patty Kazmaier Award, becoming Clarkson's ninth top-10 finalist since 2014. Clarkson head coach Matt Desrosiers called Winn "one of the most dedicated and focused athletes" he had ever coached, noting that "the work she puts in every day to get better is something that has helped inspire other teammates to also want to put in the extra time to improve."

Winn concluded her collegiate career with 37 goals and 93 assists for 130 points in 151 games, ranking second in career points among defensemen in Clarkson history, seven points behind Erin Ambrose. She earned All-American honors twice (2023–24, 2024–25) and led her team in blocked shots. Winn was also recognized for her academic achievements, earning ECAC All-Academic honors multiple times and Academic All-American recognition.

=== Professional ===
==== Boston Fleet (2025–present) ====
On June 24, 2025, Winn was selected second overall by the Boston Fleet in the 2025 PWHL Draft. Fleet general manager Danielle Marmer called Winn "a complete, two-way defender," noting her "high compete and hockey IQ" and ability to play in all situations. "When we think about who is going to produce for us, defend against the best players in our league, or run a power play, Haley Winn can be an answer to all those situations," Marmer said. On August 20, 2025, she signed a three-year Standard Player Agreement through the 2027–28 season.

Winn made her professional debut on November 23, 2025, in a 2–0 victory over the Montreal Victoire at Tsongas Center in Lowell, Massachusetts. She led all skaters with six shots on goal and was praised by head coach Kris Sparre for her two-way play. She was paired with Fleet captain Megan Keller on the top defensive pairing, with veteran forward Jamie Lee Rattray noting that "the way she carries herself on the ice is she basically plays like a veteran already."

Winn recorded her first professional points on December 7, 2025, tallying two assists in a 4–1 victory over the Minnesota Frost. She assisted on goals by Keller and Abby Newhook. Keller praised her rookie defensive partner, saying "She doesn't look like a rookie out there, and it's been fun to play with Winnie. I know she's always going to have my back out there, and it's really easy to work with her. We're having a lot of fun playing together." She recorded another assist on December 17 in a 2–0 victory over the New York Sirens, helping Ella Huber score her first professional goal on the power play. On December 27, 2025, Winn scored her first professional goal in a 3–2 shootout loss to the Ottawa Charge at TD Place Arena. She scored with 20 seconds remaining in the second period, giving the Fleet a 2–1 lead, and led all skaters with a career-high nine shots on goal. The goal moved Winn into second place in rookie scoring with five points (1 goal, 4 assists), one point behind Ottawa's Rory Guilday.

Through her first eight professional games, she led all PWHL skaters in average ice time at 26:32 per game. She helped the Fleet to a franchise-best 6–0–1–1 start through their first eight games, with the team holding first place in the PWHL standings. She finished the 2025–26 season with five goals and 14 assists in 30 regular season games and two assists in four games during the 2026 Walter Cup playoffs. Her 19 points tied for second among all rookies. Her 802:42 time on ice (26:45 per game), set a new PWHL single-season record. Following the season she was named the PWHL Rookie of the Year, becoming the first defender in league history to win the award. She was also selected to the PWHL All-Star Second Team and All-Rookie Team.

On July 14, 2026, she signed a one-year contract extension with the Fleet through the 2028–29 season.

== International play ==
=== Junior ===
Winn represented the United States at the 2019 IIHF World Women's U18 Championship in Obihiro, Japan, where she recorded three assists in five games as the youngest player on the roster at age 15. The United States won the silver medal, losing to Canada 3–2 in overtime in the gold medal game.

Winn again represented the United States at the 2020 IIHF World Women's U18 Championship in Bratislava, Slovakia, where she recorded one assist in five games. The United States won the gold medal with a perfect 5–0 record.

=== Senior ===
On October 25, 2022, Winn was named to the roster for the Rivalry Series between the United States and Canada, making her senior national team debut in November 2022 as a sophomore at Clarkson. She played alongside future Boston Fleet teammates Megan Keller, Abbey Levy, and Aerin Frankel.

Winn competed at the 2023 IIHF Women's World Championship in Brampton, Ontario, recording five assists in seven games with a +4 rating. The United States defeated Canada 6–3 in the gold medal game to capture its 10th world championship title and first since 2019. Winn became the first Clarkson player to compete at a World Championship while still enrolled at the university.

At the 2024 IIHF Women's World Championship in Utica, New York, Winn recorded two goals and one assist for three points in seven games. She scored both goals in the United States' 4–0 opening round victory over Switzerland on April 3, 2024, at the Adirondack Bank Center, earning Player of the Game honors for Team USA in front of 3,128 fans. The goals were her first with the senior national team. The United States won the silver medal, losing to Canada in overtime in the gold medal game.

Winn competed at the 2025 IIHF Women's World Championship in České Budějovice, Czech Republic, helping the United States win the gold medal. She was one of 21 returning players from the 2024 silver medal team. The United States defeated Canada 4–3 in overtime in the gold medal game on April 20, 2025, with Tessa Janecke scoring the golden goal at 17:06 of three-on-three overtime. Winn reflected on the victory, saying "Everyone had a chip on their shoulder after 2024, when we came up one shot short. We wanted to make a statement." She recalled the final moments: "I was sitting on the back bench next to Jesse Compher, and it all happened so fast when Tessa scored. The atmosphere was wild."

Across three World Championships (2023, 2024, 2025), Winn recorded two goals and nine assists for 11 points in 21 games, winning two gold medals and one silver medal. She credited veterans like Megan Keller, Savannah Harmon, and Lee Stecklein as key influences on her development, noting their mentorship and leadership.

On January 2, 2026, she was named to team USA's roster to compete at the 2026 Winter Olympics.

== Career statistics ==
=== Regular season and playoffs ===
			Regular season					Playoffs
Season	Team	League	GP	G	A	Pts	PIM	GP	G	A	Pts	PIM
2021–22	Clarkson University	ECAC	37	7	16	23	12	—	—	—	—	—
2022–23	Clarkson University	ECAC	38	6	17	23	14	—	—	—	—	—
2023–24	Clarkson University	ECAC	38	10	29	39	12	—	—	—	—	—
2024–25	Clarkson University	ECAC	38	14	32	46	10	—	—	—	—	—
2025–26	Boston Fleet	PWHL	30	5	14	19	6	4	0	2	2	2
PWHL totals			30	5	14	19	6	4	0	2	2	2

=== International ===
Year	Team	Event	Result	GP	G	A	Pts	PIM
2019	United States	U18	2nd place, silver medalist(s)	5	0	3	3	2
2020	United States	U18	1st place, gold medalist(s)	5	0	1	1	2
2023	United States	WC	1st place, gold medalist(s)	7	0	5	5	2
2024	United States	WC	2nd place, silver medalist(s)	7	2	1	3	2
2025	United States	WC	1st place, gold medalist(s)	7	0	3	3	4
2026	United States	OG	1st place, gold medalist(s)	7	1	3	4	0
Junior totals				10	0	4	4	4
Senior totals				28	3	12	15	8

== Awards and honors ==
Honors	Year	Ref
PWHL
Rookie of the Year	2026	
All-Rookie Team	2026	
All-Second Team	2026	
