= Clarkson Golden Knights women's ice hockey =

- Current season
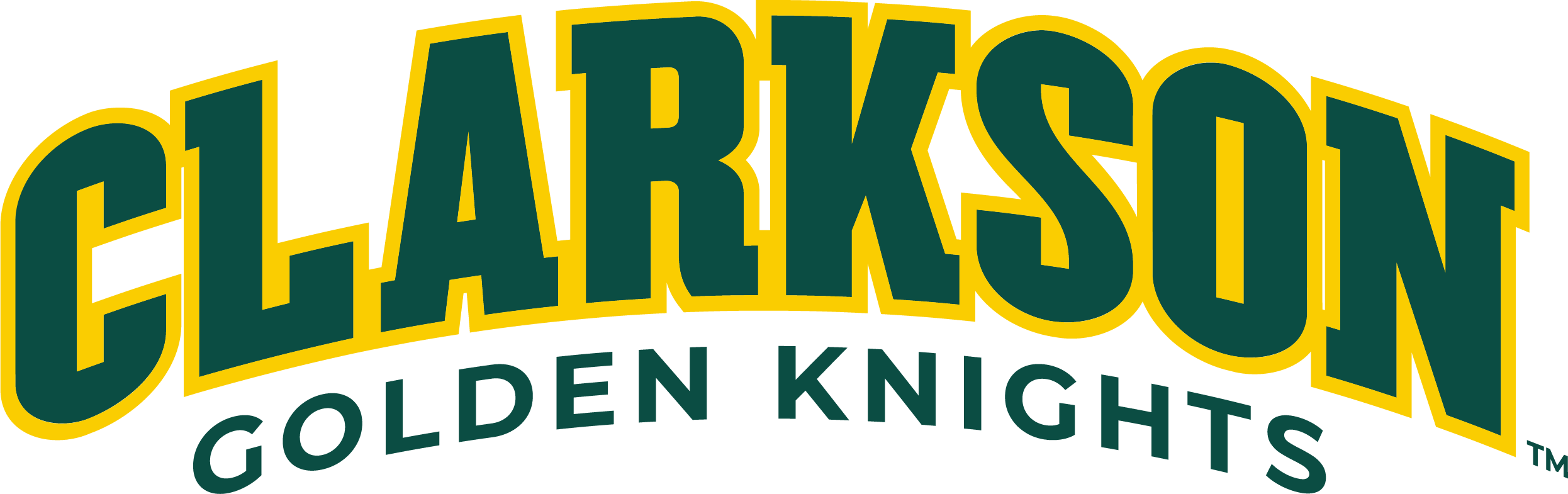
- University: Clarkson University
- Conference: ECAC
- Head coach: Matt Desrosiers; 12th season, 311–106–49
- Captain(s): Nicole Gosling, Haley Winn
- Alternate captain(s): Anne Cherkowski Kirstyn McQuigge
- Arena: Cheel Arena; Potsdam, New York
- Colors: Green and gold

NCAA tournament champions
- 2014, 2017, 2018

NCAA tournament Frozen Four
- 2014, 2016, 2017, 2018, 2019, 2024

NCAA tournament appearances
- 2010, 2013, 2014, 2015, 2016, 2017, 2018, 2019, 2020, 2022, 2023, 2024, 2025

Conference tournament champions
- 2017, 2018, 2019

Conference regular season champions
- 2014, 2015, 2017, 2018

The Clarkson Golden Knights women's hockey team is an NCAA Division I ice hockey team that represents Clarkson University in rural Potsdam, New York. The Golden Knights have been a member of ECAC Hockey since 2004, and play home games in Cheel Arena on the Clarkson University campus.

== History ==
=== Seasons 2003–04 to 2007–08 ===
While men's ice hockey has existed for a long time at Clarkson University as an NCAA Division I sport, women's ice hockey had only existed at Clarkson as a varsity sport from 1974 to 1984, long before the women's game was at all formalized. During the varsity era, the team posted a record of 77–72–3. A club team started in the 1995–96 season and existed until the sport regained varsity status. As neither the university nor the NCAA consider the original varsity team or the club team continuous with the current one all statistics and records do not carry over from either era. In 2003, Clarkson announced that it would, for the first time, field a Division I women's ice hockey team. Under head coach Rick Seeley, the team began play in the 2003–04 season. Playing as an independent, the team was able to post a respectable 16–12–3 despite being composed almost entirely of freshmen. For the 2004–05 season, Clarkson entered the ECAC (at the time known as the ECACHL), where it has played ever since. Despite struggling somewhat in its first year in the league, Clarkson was able to finish in 8th place in the conference and claim the final spot in the conference tournament, where it would be eliminated in the quarterfinals in two games by top-seeded and eventual conference champion Harvard.

Clarkson's true success as a team began in the 2005–06 season. Compiling an overall record of 22–14–1 and a conference record of 12–8–0, Clarkson was able to finish in a tie for 3rd place (5th on tie-breaks) in the ECAC. Highlighting the season was a weekend sweep of conference powerhouses Harvard and Dartmouth and a home victory over then top-ranked St. Lawrence. Only a last-second overtime loss to Harvard in the final game of the regular season prevented Clarkson from clinching both outright 3rd place and home ice for the quarterfinals of the ECAC tournament. Forced to travel for the second season in a row to Harvard for the quarterfinals, the Golden Knights dropped the first game before winning the second game in overtime, only to see their season come to an end with a double overtime loss in game 3.

While the 2006–07 team was not as successful as its predecessor, it was still able to finish with a 10–10–2 conference record (18–15–3 overall), good for 6th place in the conference (7th on tie-breaks) and a third straight bid into the ECAC tournament, where they would again be eliminated in the quarterfinal round, this time in two games by St. Lawrence. The 2007–08 season would see continued success for the Golden Knights, whose 13–6–3 conference record (24–9–5 overall) earned them fourth place in the ECAC, which in turn earned them home ice for the first time ever in the quarterfinals of the ECAC tournament. Despite dropping game 1 against Princeton, a team they had never beaten, Clarkson was able to battle back with two one goal wins to record their first ever playoff series victory two games to one. The Golden Knights would then be eliminated in the single game conference semifinals at Harvard with a 0–3 loss.

The 2007–08 season would mark the end of an era for Clarkson, as head coach Rick Seeley left for the head coaching job at Quinnipiac at the end of the season. Immediately following his departure, Clarkson announced that he would be replaced by assistant coaches Shannon & Matt Desrosiers, who would form the first husband and wife co-head coaching duo in NCAA women's ice hockey.

=== Seasons 2008–09 to 2013–14 ===
Under the new coaches, the 2008–09 campaign was less successful for the Golden Knights, although they still enjoyed another winning season and spot in the ECAC tournament. Backed by very strong defense and goaltending, Clarkson finished 16–14–6 overall and 10–8–4 conference record finish 7th in the ECAC. The team would bow out of the conference tournament in two games to St. Lawrence in the quarterfinals to end their season.

The 2009–10 team enjoyed unprecedented success. Featuring a team full of seniors, Clarkson posted a 23–12–5 overall record and a 14–5–3 conference record, just short of their first ECAC regular season championship. Entering the ECAC tournament as the second seed, they won the quarterfinals in three games over rivals St. Lawrence before hosting, and defeating, Harvard University in the semifinals. Advancing to their first ever conference championship game, Clarkson would fall 3–4 in overtime against top-seeded Cornell. Despite being denied their first conference championship, the Golden Knights season was good enough to earn them a bid to their first ever NCAA tournament. Going on the road to face third-seeded Minnesota, a team that had shut out the Golden Knights the two times they had met earlier that year, Clarkson rallied from a 0–2 deficit to force overtime before falling 2–3 in the extra session to close the best Clarkson season up until that time.

The loss of the 2009–10 seniors to graduation caused Clarkson to suffer a slow start to the 2010–11 season, which ultimately cost the team its streak of 5 consecutive winning seasons, as the team would finish 14–17–6. The team did eventually recover down the stretch, and they were able to finish 10–8–4 in ECAC play, which was good enough for 6th place, which improved them to 7 for 7 in making ECAC tournaments. Despite an encouraging 4–1 victory in game 1 at Dartmouth, Clarkson would be eliminated in the quarterfinals of the ECAC tournament, dropping game 2 and game 3, the latter being a 3–4 loss in overtime. This team was notable for featuring freshmen Jamie Lee Rattray, Carly Mercer, and goaltender Erica Howe, all of whom would play a major role for Clarkson over the next three seasons.

The 2011–12 season would offer a glimpse of what would come over the next couple seasons for the Golden Knights, finishing 22–10–5 overall. In conference play, Clarkson totaled their greatest number of wins and points at the time with a 15–5–2 record, which landed them in third place. The team's postseason troubles from previous years, however, finally came to a head as they crashed out at home in three games in the quarterfinals of the conference tournament against sixth-seeded Quinnipiac. This loss not only ended their hopes for a conference title, but also ensured that the team would miss the NCAA tournament.

The 2012–13 season continued to build on the success from the previous year and set team records for wins, conference wins, and conference points with overall and conference records of 28–10–0 and 18–4–0 respectively. The conference record helped Clarkson finish in a tie for second in the ECAC, only missing first by one point. In the conference quarterfinals, the team completed its first ever sweep of an opponent, as it defeated RPI in two games at home, before losing in Ithaca, NY (starting with the 2012 tournament, the top-seeded team has hosted the semifinals and finals of the ECAC tournament) to the Harvard Crimson 2–4. The impressive season was good enough to earn Clarkson an at large-bid to the NCAA tournament, where they visited third-seeded, and eventual runners-up, Boston University in the quarterfinals. They lost 3–5, closing out what was, at the time, arguably the best season in team history.

The 2013–14 season was certainly the best in team history and arguably the best season for any team in any sport in the history of Clarkson University. In a season that saw two players, Rattray and defenseman Erin Ambrose, a sophomore, be named All-Americans, Clarkson, backed by a strong group of seniors that had begun to play together in the 2010–11 season, Clarkson set team records in overall number of games played wins, and wins percentage win percentage with an overall record of 31–5–5, as well as winning their first ever ECAC regular season title, with a conference record of 16–2–4. The title, which was clinched on the last day of the regular season with a 2–1 overtime win over heavy underdogs Union, gave Clarkson the top-seed in the ECAC playoffs which gave Clarkson, after sweeping Dartmouth in the tournament quarterfinals, the right to host both the semifinals and the finals of the ECAC tournament. In a result that was not surprising but a score that was, Clarkson defeated nationally ranked and NCAA tournament hopeful Quinnipiac 6–0 in the semifinal game, giving Clarkson a chance to play in its second ever ECAC Championship game. The victory, however, came at a cost as Ambrose was lost late in the game for the remainder of the season. Clarkson's hopes for its first ECAC tournament championship were ended by Cornell in the championship game by a score of 0–1. Despite the loss, Clarkson's season was strong enough not only to ensure that would the team make the NCAA tournament, but also to ensure that the team would be seeded in the tournament for the first time. Entering the tournament as the three-seed, Clarkson hosted its first NCAA tournament game against Boston College, which they won 3–1, earning their first trip to the Frozen Four which was held in Hamden, CT. In the semifinal game, they faced Mercyhurst, where, despite falling behind 0–1 early, Clarkson was able to win 5–1 and advance to face two-time defending national champion and top-seeded Minnesota. On the day before the national championship game, Rattray made team history by winning the Patty Kazmaier Award, women's collegiate ice hockey's top award. In a closely fought national championship game, Clarkson was able to prevail 5–4 to win the program's as well as the university's first national championship. In the process, the team also became the first team from outside the WCHA to win the women's National Collegiate national championship.

=== Seasons 2014–15 to present ===
On April 21, 2014, almost a month after the national championship victory, it was announced that Shannon Desrosiers would step down as co-head coach, leaving her husband Matt in full control of the team. The decision was made in order for Shannon to spend more time raising the couple's daughter and soon-to-be-born second child. Despite this loss, the loss of an assistant coach, and the loss of arguably the most talented class in program history, Clarkson was still able to muster a respectable season in 2014–15, finishing 24–11–3 overall. A win over Harvard in the last game of the regular season gave the Golden Knights a conference record of 16–4–2, earning them a split of the regular season conference championship with the Crimson and a number one seed in the conference tournament. While they were able to sweep Dartmouth for the second year in a row in the conference quarterfinals, the Golden Knights ultimately fell in the conference semifinals to Cornell 1–3. Despite the loss, the Golden Knights still earned their third straight at-large bid into the NCAA tournament, where they fell in the quarterfinals against second-seeded Boston College 1–5.

The 2015–16 saw Clarkson start out with a team record nine straight wins, before the winning streak was snapped in a 0–0 tie with Harvard. The team pushed the unbeaten streak to 12 games before a shocking 1–2 loss to RPI, a team which had not made the ECAC tournament in two years. The rest of 2015 saw Clarkson struggle to get on track in ECAC play, entering the holiday break at just .500 in conference play. The team rebounded in the second half, rattling off a 14-game unbeaten streak to finish the regular season at 26–3–5 overall, the team's best ever regular season record. Unlike their previous best regular season in 2013–14, however, they finished second in the conference with a 14–3–5 record, behind Quinnipiac. The ECAC quarterfinals saw Clarkson earn their fourth consecutive sweep, this time over Cornell, exacting some revenge for the previous two season's ECAC tournament exits. The ECAC semifinals saw Clarkson advance for the first time ever in an ECAC tournament away from home with a 5–2 win over Colgate. They were, however, denied an ECAC title for the third straight title game by Quinnipiac in a 0–1 defeat that saw both teams register season lows for shots (17 for Quinnipiac versus 16 for Clarkson). For the fourth straight year Clarkson gained an at-large bid to the NCAA tournament. Their quarterfinal game was a rematch of the ECAC championship game, also being played at Quinnipiac. This time, however, it was Clarkson who gained the 1–0 victory by holding Quinnipiac to only 14 shots. The quarterfinal win, which was their first ever postseason victory as the away team (not counting single game wins in best-of-three series they ultimately lost) sent them to their second Frozen Four. There, they hoped to repeat their magic from 2013–14 as they face a 39–0–0 Boston College team. Despite jumping out to a 2–0 lead, and leading until late in the third period, they ultimately fell 2–3 in overtime, ending their season and the collegiate careers of their most successful class. Their final record for the season was 30–5–5.

Graduation of another talented class, the first to make the NCAA tournament all four years it played for Clarkson, left the team entering 2016–17 season with much uncertainty. Despite this uncertainty, they still started the season ranked 5th. Although they dropped an exhibition game for only the second time in program history and for the first time since before their first season, Clarkson won their first two official games against Penn State to move up to fourth. Following this, however, the team lost a game and only managed to tie another on an extra-attacker goal in a nonconference home-and-home against rival St. Lawrence, before falling in two games at home to top-ranked Wisconsin. This dropped them to 2–3–1 and eighth overall. Two 3–1 against at New Hampshire wins the next weekend stabilized the situation, but failed to give any indication that Clarkson would be among the nation's elites on the season. Something clicked, however, in the following eight games that saw Clarkson win all eight while not being held below four goals a single time and scoring eight goals twice. Combined with the two wins against UNH, Clarkson set a new program record for longest win streak at ten while also earning their coach his 200th all-time win. The win streak came to an end with a 3–3 tie against Robert Morris in the semifinal game of the Windjammer Classic. Clarkson won that game's shoutout, the program's first ever, and advanced to the championship of the tournament, where they bested Vermont 3–1 for their first ever in-season tournament championship. The following weekend saw them clash with the only remaining undefeated team in the country, third-ranked St. Lawrence. After escaping with another extra-attacker goal tie in the first game, Clarkson sent the Saints to their first loss with a 4–1 win, giving them the frontrunner position in the ECAC. Clarkson pushed its unbeaten streak to 18, tying the second longest such streak in program history, before falling to Cornell. A period of lackluster play in the following weeks against the conference's weakest teams resulted in wins until Clarkson escaped with a 2–2 tie via another extra-attacker goal against a struggling Harvard team. This left them only one point ahead of St. Lawrence in the standings entering into the second-to-last weekend of the season. The team snapped out of its funk to defeat both Princeton and Quinnipiac. Coupled with a St. Lawrence tie and loss, this gave Clarkson their third ECAC Regular Season title. Clarkson won its remaining two games the next weekend to finish with a 19–1–2 conference record, easily the best in its history. Clarkson easily dispatched ECAC eight-seed RPI in the ECAC Quarterfinals to reach the semifinals for the fifth-straight year. Clarkson then dispatched Princeton 4–0 in the semifinals for their fourth try at an ECAC Championship and their third such try against Cornell. Clarkson reversed their previous championship game results to win 1–0 and claim their first championship. Their first auto-bid to the NCAA Tournament gained them the two-seed. The quarterfinals of this tournament featured a rematch of the ECAC Championship Game against Cornell, which was again won by Clarkson, this time by a score of 3–1. The win sent them to the third Frozen Four. They met Minnesota in the semifinals in a rematch of the 2014 Championship Game, with Clarkson again prevailing, this time by a score of 4–3. In the championship game they met top-seeded Wisconsin. Riding a 41-save performance from their goaltender, Shea Tiley, Clarkson won their second national title by a score of 3–0. On offense for the season, the Golden Knights were led by senior Cayley Mercer, who finished second all-time on the team for points with 178 and first for goals with 80. She ended the season tied for most points in the NCAA and as Clarkson's second-ever finalist for the Patty Kazmaier Award.

=== Year by year ===
| Won Championship | Lost Championship | Regular Season Conference Champions |

| Year | Coach | W | L | T | Conference | Conf. W | Conf. L | Conf. T | Points | Conference Rank | Conf. Tournament | NCAA Tournament |
| 2024–25 | Matt Desrosiers | 25 | 13 | 2 | ECAC | 18 | 8 | 1 | | 4th | Won Quarterfinals vs. Quinnipiac (1–3, 2–1, 4-1); Lost Semifinals vs. Cornell (1–2 3OT) | Won Opening Round vs. Boston University (3–1); Lost Quarterfinals vs. Wisconsin (1–4) |
| 2023–24 | Matt Desrosiers | 33 | 5 | 2 | ECAC | 18 | 3 | 1 | | 2nd | Won Quarterfinals vs. Princeton (3–2 2OT, 6-3); Won Semifinals vs. St. Lawrence (3–1); Lost Championship vs. Colgate (0–3) | Won Quarterfinals vs. Minnesota (3–2 4OT); Lost Semifinals vs. Ohio State (1–4) |
| 2022-23 | Matt Desrosiers | 29 | 11 | 2 | ECAC | 15 | 6 | 1 | 45.5 | 4th | Won Quarterfinals vs. Cornell (5–1, 1–2 2OT, 4-1); Won Semifinals vs. Yale (4–3 2OT); Lost Championship vs. Colgate (2–8) | Lost First Round vs. Minnesota-Duluth (0–2) |
| 2021–22 | Matt Desrosiers | 22 | 12 | 3 | ECAC | 13 | 8 | 1 | 41.5 | 5th | Lost Quarterfinals vs. Quinnipiac (1–5, 0–4) | Lost First Round vs. Wisconsin (1–3) |
| 2020–21 | Matt Desrosiers | 8 | 10 | 1 | ECAC | 3 | 6 | 0 | — | 3rd | Lost Semifinals vs. St. Lawrence (3-4 OT) | — |
| 2019–20 | Matt Desrosiers | 25 | 6 | 6 | ECAC | 14 | 4 | 4 | 32 | 3rd | Won Quarterfinals vs. Colgate (2–1 OT, 2–0); Lost Semifinals vs. Princeton (5–1) | NCAA tournament cancelled due to the COVID-19 coronavirus pandemic |
| 2018–19 | Matt Desrosiers | 30 | 8 | 2 | ECAC | 16 | 5 | 1 | 33 | Tied 2nd | Won Quarterfinals vs. Quinnipiac (3–0, 4–3 OT); Won Semifinals vs. Colgate (2–0); Won Championship vs. Cornell (4–1) | Won Quarterfinals vs. Boston College (2–1 OT); Lost Semifinals vs. Wisconsin (0–5) |
| 2017–18 | Matt Desrosiers | 36 | 4 | 1 | ECAC | 19 | 3 | 0 | 38 | Tied 1st | Won Quarterfinals vs. Yale (10–1, 4–1); Won Semifinals vs. St. Lawrence (4–2); Won Championship vs. Colgate (3–0) | Won Quarterfinals vs. Mercyhurst (2–1 OT); Won Semifinals vs. Ohio State (1–0 OT); Won Championship vs. Colgate (2–1 OT) |
| 2016–17 | Matt Desrosiers | 32 | 4 | 5 | ECAC | 19 | 1 | 2 | 40 | 1st | Won Quarterfinals vs. RPI (4–1, 5–2); Won Semifinals vs. Princeton (4–0); Won Championship vs. Cornell (1–0) | Won Quarterfinals vs. Cornell (3–1); Won Semifinals vs. Minnesota (4–3); Won Championship vs. Wisconsin (3–0) |
| 2015–16 | Matt Desrosiers | 30 | 5 | 5 | ECAC | 14 | 3 | 5 | 33 | 2nd | Won Quarterfinals vs. Cornell (2–0, 5–2); Won Semifinals vs. Colgate (5–2); Lost Championship vs. Quinnipiac (0–1) | Won Quarterfinals vs. Quinnipiac (1–0); Lost Semifinals vs. Boston College (2–3 OT) |
| 2014–15 | Matt Desrosiers | 24 | 11 | 3 | ECAC | 16 | 4 | 2 | 34 | Tied 1st | Won Quarterfinals vs. Dartmouth (6–0, 4–1); Lost Semifinals vs. Cornell (1–3) | Lost Quarterfinals vs. Boston College (1–5) |
| 2013–14 | Shannon Desrosiers & Matt Desrosiers | 31 | 5 | 5 | ECAC | 16 | 2 | 4 | 36 | 1st | Won Quarterfinals vs. Dartmouth (2–0, 2–0); Won Semifinals vs. Quinnipiac (6–0); Lost Championship vs. Cornell (0–1) | Won Quarterfinals vs. Boston College (3–1); Won Semifinals vs. Mercyhurst (5–1); Won Championship vs. Minnesota (5–4) |
| 2012–13 | Shannon Desrosiers & Matt Desrosiers | 28 | 10 | 0 | ECAC | 18 | 4 | 0 | 36 | Tied 2nd | Won Quarterfinals vs. RPI (3–2 OT, 5–2); Lost Semifinals vs. Harvard (2–4) | Lost Quarterfinals vs. Boston University (3–5) |
| 2011–12 | Shannon Desrosiers & Matt Desrosiers | 22 | 10 | 5 | ECAC | 15 | 5 | 2 | 32 | 3rd | Lost Quarterfinals vs. Quinnipiac (1–4, 2–1, 0–2) | — |
| 2010–11 | Shannon Desrosiers & Matt Desrosiers | 14 | 17 | 6 | ECAC | 10 | 8 | 4 | 24 | 6th | Lost Quarterfinals vs. Dartmouth (4–1, 2–4, 3–4 OT) | — |
| 2009–10 | Shannon Desrosiers & Matt Desrosiers | 23 | 12 | 5 | ECAC | 14 | 5 | 3 | 31 | 2nd | Won Quarterfinals vs. St. Lawrence (5–0, 1–2, 4–1); Won Semifinals vs. Harvard (3–2); Lost Championship vs. Cornell (3–4 OT) | Lost Quarterfinals vs. Minnesota (2–3 OT) |
| 2008–09 | Shannon Desrosiers & Matt Desrosiers | 16 | 14 | 6 | ECAC | 10 | 8 | 4 | 24 | 7th | Lost Quarterfinals vs. St. Lawrence (3–4 OT, 1–2) | — |
| 2007–08 | Rick Seeley | 24 | 9 | 5 | ECAC | 13 | 6 | 3 | 29 | 4th | Won Quarterfinals vs. Princeton (0–1, 3–2 OT, 2–1); Lost Semifinals vs. Harvard (0–3) | — |
| 2006–07 | Rick Seeley | 18 | 15 | 3 | ECAC | 10 | 10 | 2 | 22 | Tied 6th | Lost Quarterfinals vs. St. Lawrence (2–3, 1–3) | — |
| 2005–06 | Rick Seeley | 22 | 14 | 1 | ECAC | 12 | 8 | 0 | 24 | Tied 3rd | Lost Quarterfinals vs. Harvard (0–1, 2–1 OT, 1–2 2OT) | Ineligible |
| 2004–05 | Rick Seeley | 13 | 17 | 6 | ECAC | 7 | 12 | 1 | 15 | 8th | Lost Quarterfinals vs. Harvard (0–5, 1–3) | Ineligible |
| 2003–04 | Rick Seeley | 16 | 12 | 3 | Independent | | | | | | | Ineligible |

== Current roster ==
As of September 26, 2022.

| No. | Nat. | Player | Class | Pos | Height | DoB | Hometown | Previous team |
|---|---|---|---|---|---|---|---|---|
| 2 | (United States) | Paige Wallace | Freshman | F | 5' 5" (1.65 m) | 2006-12-21 | Huntington, New York | Bishop Kearney Selects |
| 3 | (Canada) | Keira Hurry (A) | Junior | D | 5' 9" (1.75 m) | 2005-03-07 | London, Ontario | London Jr. Devilettes |
| 4 | (United States) | Morgan Walton | Freshman | D | 5' 6" (1.68 m) | 2006-03-01 | Geneseo, New York | Bishop Kearney Selects |
| 6 | (United States) | Megan McKay | Senior | D | 5' 10" (1.78 m) | 2003-06-20 | Zionsville, Indiana | Mercyhurst |
| 7 | (Canada) | Jaela Carter | Freshman | D | 5' 6" (1.68 m) | 2007-04-24 | Niagara Falls, Ontario | Burlington Barracudas AA |
| 8 | (Canada) | Bridget Stevenson | Junior (RS) | F | 5' 6" (1.68 m) | 2004-00-00 | Woodstock, Ontario | London Jr. Devilettes |
| 9 | (Canada) | Rhea Hicks | Senior | F | 5' 5" (1.65 m) | 2004-10-04 | Etobicoke, Ontario | Syracuse |
| 10 | (United States) | Lara Beecher | Senior | F | 5' 5" (1.65 m) | 2004-11-10 | Buffalo, New York | Vermont |
| 11 | (Canada) | Kaitlyn Mallette | Freshman | D | 5' 10" (1.78 m) | 2007-07-24 | Kelowna, British Columbia | Rink Hockey Academy Kelowna |
| 12 | (Canada) | Sidney Ullmann | Freshman | D | 5' 7" (1.7 m) | 2005-06-16 | Dorval, Quebec | John Abbott College |
| 13 | (Czech Republic) | Andrea Trnková | Junior | D | 5' 9" (1.75 m) | 2002-03-03 | Ustí nad Orlicí, Czechia | RPI |
| 14 | (Canada) | Gabrielle Lalonde | Freshman | F | 5' 6" (1.68 m) | 2005-01-30 | Pointe-Claire, Quebec | John Abbott College |
| 15 | (United States) | Greta Brezenski | Sophomore | F | 5' 5" (1.65 m) | 2005-09-29 | Waunakee, Wisconsin | Bishop Kearney Selects |
| 16 | (Canada) | Layla Matthew | Freshman | F | 5' 7" (1.7 m) | 2007-03-11 | Edmonton, Alberta | Edmonton Jr. Oilers |
| 17 | (Canada) | Janelle Evans | Junior | F | 5' 4" (1.63 m) | 2005-02-17 | Bethune, Saskatchewan | Robert Morris |
| 18 | (Canada) | Raedyn Spademan | Sophomore | F | 5' 6" (1.68 m) | 2006-06-20 | Cochrane, Alberta | Rink Hockey Academy Kelowna |
| 19 | (United States) | Caroline Aufiero | Junior | D | 5' 3" (1.6 m) | 2005-07-27 | Belmont, Massachusetts | East Coast Wizards 19U |
| 20 | (Canada) | Jenna Smellie | Sophomore | F | 5' 6" (1.68 m) | 2006-01-23 | Whitby, Ontario | Etobicoke Dolphins |
| 21 | (France) | Manon le Scodan | Freshman | F | 5' 7" (1.7 m) | 2004-12-25 | Sallanches, France | John Abbott College |
| 22 | (Canada) | Reese Logan | Sophomore | F | 5' 8" (1.73 m) | 2006-03-05 | Burlington, Ontario | Minnesota Duluth |
| 24 | (Canada) | Kate Manness | Freshman | D | 5' 5" (1.65 m) | 2007-09-26 | Winnipeg, Manitoba | Burlington Barracudas AA |
| 25 | (Canada) | Sena Catterall (C) | Senior | F | 5' 5" (1.65 m) | 2001-00-00 | Montreal, Quebec | John Abbott College |
| 26 | (Canada) | Sara Manness | Freshman | F | 5' 9" (1.75 m) | 2007-09-26 | Winnipeg, Manitoba | Burlington Barracudas AA |
| 27 | (Canada) | Madiosn Chantler | Senior | F | 5' 5" (1.65 m) | 2004-11-30 | London, Ontario | Quinnipiac |
| 28 | (Canada) | Shelby Laidlaw | Junior | F | 5' 8" (1.73 m) | 2005-12-07 | Aylmer, Ontario | London Jr Devilettes |
| 29 | (Canada) | Arianne Leblanc | Junior | G | 5' 9" (1.75 m) | 2005-03-18 | Repentigny, Quebec | Concordia |
| 31 | (Czech Republic) | Aneta Šenková | Freshman | G | 5' 6" (1.68 m) | 2006-06-24 | Lovosice, Czechia | Kingston Jr Ice Wolves |
| 35 | (United States) | Holly Gruber | Graduate | G | 5' 7" (1.7 m) | 2002-05-24 | Stevens Point, Wisconsin | Minnesota Duluth |

== Leading scorers ==
Stats as of end of 2024–25 season
Bold denotes active player
Italics denotes program record

| **Rank** | **Player** | **Games Played** | **Goals** | **Assists** | **Points** |
| 1 | Elizabeth Giguere | 137 | 99 | 134 | 233 |
| 2 | Loren Gabel | 160 | 116 | 97 | 213 |
| 3 | Jamie Lee Rattray | 147 | 77 | 104 | 181 |
| 4 | Cayley Mercer | 160 | 80 | 98 | 178 |
| 5 | Michaela Pejzlova | 148 | 64 | 102 | 166 |
| 6 | Carly Mercer | 153 | 53 | 97 | 150 |
| 7 | Genevieve Bannon | 160 | 49 | 101 | 150 |
| 8 | Gabrielle David | 135 | 58 | 91 | 149 |
| 8 | Brittany Selina | 148 | 50 | 98 | 148 |
| 9 | Erin Ambrose | 132 | 33 | 104 | 137 |

== Awards and honors ==
- Erin Ambrose – 2014 Patty Kazmaier Award Top 10, 2014 First Team All-USCHO.com, 2016 Second Team All-USCHO.com
- Genevieve Bannon – 2017 Second Team All-USCHO.com
- Gabrielle David - 2020 USCHO.com Rookie of the Year
- Erica Howe – 2014 Second Team All-USCHO.com
- Loren Gabel – 2018 Patty Kazmaier Award Finalist, 2019 Patty Kazmaier Award Winner
- Vanessa Gagnon – 2014 Sarah Devens Award
- Elizabeth Giguere - 2019 First Team All-USCHO.com, 2019 USCHO.com Player of the Year, 2019 Patty Kazmaier Award Top 10, 2020 Patty Kazmaier Award Winner, 2020 First Team All-USCHO.com
- Savannah Harmon – 2017 Second Team All-USCHO.com, 2018 Patty Kazmaier Award Top 10
- Kira Hurley – 2006 Second Team All-USCHO.com
- Cayley Mercer – 2017 Patty Kazmaier Award Finalist, 2017 USCHO.com Player of the Year, 2017 First Team All-USCHO.com, 2016 Third Team All-USCHO.com
- Jamie Lee Rattray – 2014 Patty Kazmaier Award Winner, 2014 USCHO.com Player of the Year, 2014 First Team All-USCHO.com
- Ella Shelton – 2017 USCHO.com All-Rookie Team, 2020 Second Team All-USCHO.com, 2019-20 ECAC Hockey First Team All-League
- Michelle Pasiechnyk – 2024 WCHA National Goalie of the Year
- Shea Tiley – 2018 Patty Kazmaier Award Top 10, 2017 Second Team All-USCHO.com
- Haley Winn – 2025 ECAC Player of the Year, ECAC Defender of the Year
- Sara Manness – 2026 ECAC Player of the Year, ECAC Forward of the Year, ECAC Rookie of the Year, Julie Chu Women's National Rookie of the Year Award
- Lindsay Williams – 2007 Sarah Devens Award

=== All-America selections ===
- Erin Ambrose – 2014 First Team AHCA All-American
- Loren Gabel – 2018 First Team AHCA All-American, 2019 First Team AHCA All-American
- Elizabeth Giguere – 2018 Second Team AHCA All-American, 2019 First Team AHCA All-American, 2020 First Team AHCA All-American
- Nicole Gosling - 2024 AHCA 1st Team All-American
- Savannah Harmon – 2017 Second Team AHCA All-American, 2018 First Team AHCA All-American
- Kira Hurley – 2006 Second Team AHCA All-American
- Cayley Mercer – 2017 First Team AHCA All-American
- Michelle Pasiechnyk - 2024 2nd Team AHCA All-American
- Jamie Lee Rattray – 2014 First Team AHCA All-American
- Ella Shelton - 2019 Second Team AHCA All-American, 2020 Second Team AHCA All-American
- Shea Tiley – 2018 First Team AHCA All-American
- Haley Winn - 2024 2nd Team AHCA All-American

== Golden Knights in professional hockey ==
| = CWHL All-Star | = NWHL/PHF All-Star | = Clarkson Cup Champion | = Isobel Cup Champion | = Walter Cup Champion |

| Player | Position | Team(s) | League(s) | Years | Clarkson Cup | Isobel Cup | Walter Cup |
|---|---|---|---|---|---|---|---|
| Erin Ambrose | Defense | Toronto Furies; Canadiennes de Montreal | CWHL | 3 | | | |
| Genevieve Bannon | Forward | Göteborg HC; Les Canadiennes de Montréal; Dream Gap Tour | SDHL; CWHL; PWHPA | 3 | | | |
| Brooke Beazer | Defense | Brampton Thunder; Toronto Furies; GTA West | CWHL; PWHPA | 7 | 1 (2014) | | |
| Lauren Dahm | Goaltender | Boston Blades | CWHL | 3 | | | |
| Gabrielle David | Forward | Montreal Victoire | PWHL | 1 | | | |
| Gabrielle David | Forward | Seattle Torrent | PWHL | 1 | | | |
| Renata Fast | Defense | Toronto Furies | CWHL | 2 | | | |
| Renata Fast | Defense | Toronto Sceptres | PWHL | 3 | | | |
| Loren Gabel | Forward | Boston Pride | PHF | | | | |
| Loren Gabel | Forward | Boston Fleet | PWHL | 3 | | | |
| Savannah Harmon | Defense | Buffalo Beauts; Team Minnesota | CWHL; PWHPA | 3 | | | |
| Savannah Harmon | Defense | Ottawa Charge | PWHL | 1 | | | |
| Savannah Harmon | Defense | Toronto Sceptres | PWHL | 2 | | | |
| Kira Hurley | Goaltender | Evansville IceMen; Broome County Barons; Brampton Thunder | AAHL; Federal Hockey League; CWHL | | | | |
| Erica Howe | Goaltender | Markham Thunder | CWHL | 5 | 1 (2018) | | |
| Erica Howe | Goaltender | Toronto Sceptres | PWHL | 1 | | | |
| Brooke McQuigge | Forward | Minnesota Frost | PWHL | 1 | | | 1 (2025) |
| Brooke McQuigge | Forward | Vancouver Goldeneyes | PWHL | 1 | | | |
| Brooke McQuigge | Forward | Ottawa Charge | PWHL | 1 | | | |
| Dominique Petrie | Forward | Minnesota Frost | PWHL | 2 | | | 1 (2025) |
| Jamie Lee Rattray | Forward | Markham Thunder | CWHL | 5 | 1 (2018) | | |
| Jamie Lee Rattray | Forward | Boston Fleet | PWHL | 3 | | | |
| Kassidy Sauve | Goaltender | Dream Gap Tour | PWHPA | | | | |
| Ella Shelton | Defense | Dream Gap Tour | PWHPA | | | | |
| Ella Shelton | Defense | New York Sirens | PWHL | 2 | | | |
| Ella Shelton | Defense | Toronto Sceptres | PWHL | 1 | | | |
| Dominique Thibault | Forward | Montreal Axion; Canadiennes de Montreal | NWHL; CWHL | 5 | 2 (2011 and 2012) | | |
| Shea Tiley | Goaltender | Toronto Furies | CWHL | 1 | | | |
| Taylor Turnquist | Forward | Boston Pride | NWHL | | | 1 (2021) | |

== Olympians ==
- Erin Ambrose, Canada: 2022 and 2026 Olympics
- Jamie Lee Rattray, Canada: 2022 Olympics
- Manon le Scodan, France:2026 Winter Olympics

== See also ==
- Clarkson Golden Knights men's ice hockey
- Clarkson University
