= Kamil Witkowski =

Polish footballer

Personal information
- Date of birth: 9 December 1984 (age 41)
- Place of birth: Lublin, Poland
- Height: 1.82 m (6 ft 0 in)
- Position: Forward

Youth career
- Lublinianka
- Syracuse Blitz SC

Senior career*
Years	Team	Apps	(Gls)
2003	Motor Lublin II		
2004	Wisła Kraków II		
2004	Orlęta Radzyń Podlaski		
2005–2007	Górnik Polkowice	80	(18)
2007–2009	Cracovia	36	(6)
2009	→ Górnik Łęczna (loan)	11	(4)
2011	Znicz Pruszków	23	(8)
2012	Lublinianka	10	(1)
2014–2015	Lublinianka	23	(8)
2016	Lewart Lubartów	6	(2)
2016–2017	Polonia Gwardia New York		

Managerial career
- 2019–2020: Motor Lublin II
- 2020: Powiślak Końskowola
- 2021–2022: Stal Poniatowa
- 2022–2023: KS Wiązownica
- 2023–2024: Karpaty Krosno
- 2024–2025: Stal Kraśnik
- 2025: Lewart Lubartów
- 2025–2026: Motor Lublin II
- * Club domestic league appearances and goals

Kamil Witkowski (born 9 December 1984) is a Polish professional football manager and former player who played as a forward. He was most recently in charge of IV liga Lublin club Motor Lublin II.

Witkowski played high school soccer in the United States for Bishop Kearney High School in Rochester, New York, USA. He scored 110 goals in four years at Kearney, which puts him at number seven on the all-time scoring list in Section V.

== Managerial statistics ==
As of match played 13 June 2026

Managerial record by team and tenure
Team	From	To	Record							
Team	From	To	G	W	D	L	GF	GA	GD	Win %
Motor Lublin II	1 July 2019	23 May 2020	14	14	0	0	118	5	+113	100.00
Powiślak Końskowola	23 May 2020	21 October 2020	13	7	3	3	35	20	+15	53.85
Stal Poniatowa	1 January 2021	29 December 2022	68	54	5	9	225	56	+169	79.41
KS Wiązownica	29 December 2022	30 June 2023	18	8	3	7	31	27	+4	44.44
Karpaty Krosno	25 September 2023	10 April 2024	16	4	5	7	22	29	−7	25.00
Stal Kraśnik	15 April 2024	3 March 2025	31	24	6	1	83	13	+70	77.42
Lewart Lubartów	4 July 2025	6 August 2025	0	0	0	0	0	0	—	
Motor Lublin II	14 August 2025	6 July 2026	33	15	7	11	62	40	+22	45.45
Total			193	126	29	38	576	190	+386	65.28

== Honours ==
=== Manager ===
Motor Lublin II

- Klasa A Lublin II: 2019–20

Stal Poniatowa

- Regional league Lublin: 2021–22
- Polish Cup (Lublin Country regionals): 2021–22
