= Nicole Gosling =

Canadian ice hockey player (born 2002)

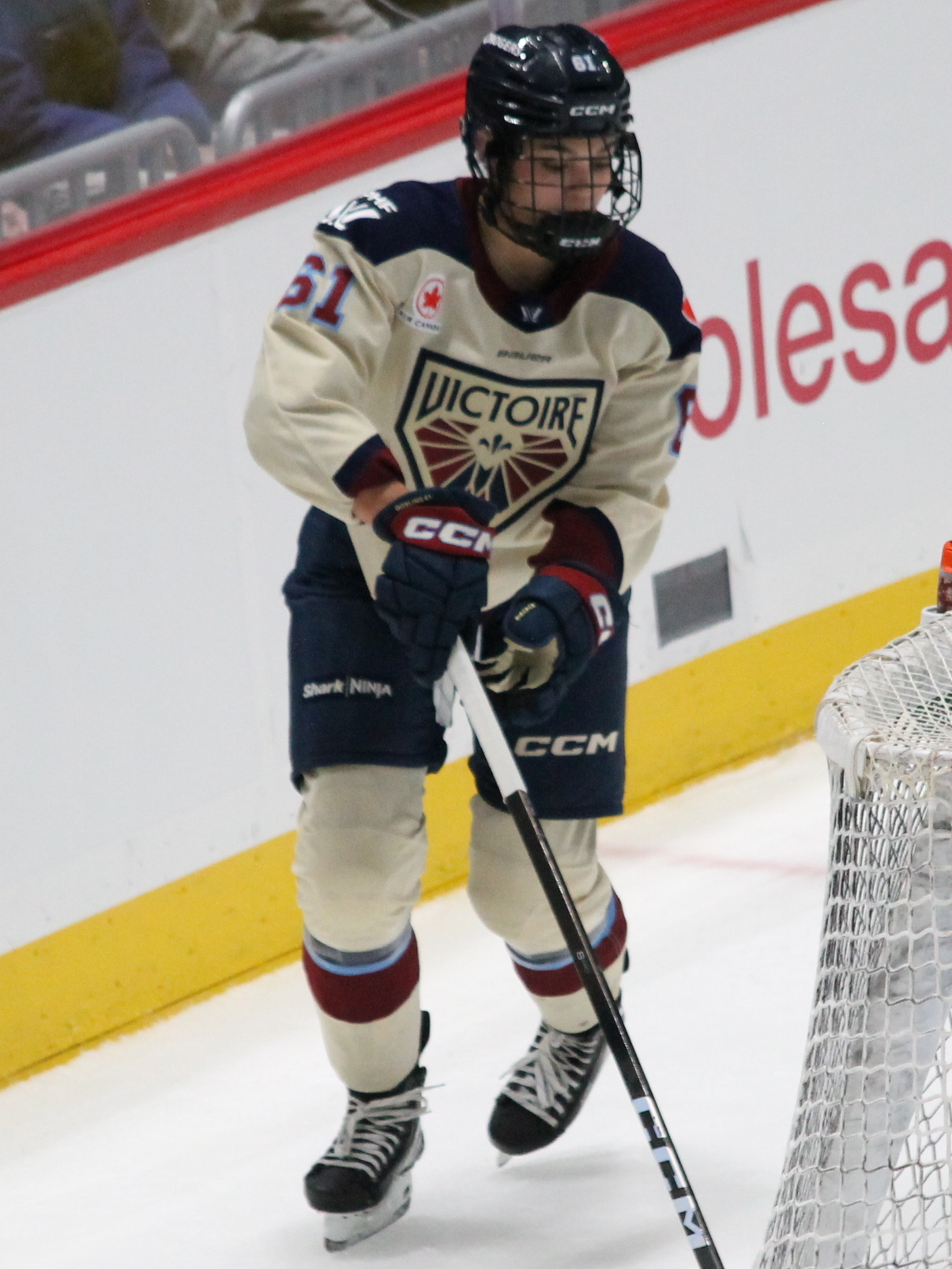
- Gosling with the Montreal Victoire in 2026
- Born: April 21, 2002 (age 24) London, Ontario, Canada
- Height: 5 ft 7 in (170 cm)
- Weight: 141 lb (64 kg; 10 st 1 lb)
- Position: Defender
- Shoots: Left
- PWHL team Former teams: Hamilton Havoc; Montreal Victoire
- National team: Canada
- Playing career: 2020–present

Nicole Gosling (born April 21, 2002) is a Canadian professional ice hockey defender for the Hamilton Havoc of the Professional Women's Hockey League (PWHL) and member of Canada women's national ice hockey team. She played college ice hockey at Clarkson.

== Early life ==
Gosling played junior ice hockey for the London Jr. Devilettes of the Provincial Women's Hockey League. During the 2018–19 season, she helped lead the Devilettes to their first league and provincial championships in program history. She was named captain of the Devilettes during the 2019–20 season.

== Playing career ==
=== College ===
Gosling began her collegiate career for Clarkson during the 2020–21 season, where she recorded four goals and ten assists in 19 games. She led all ECAC defenders in scoring with 14 points. Following the season she was named to the ECAC All-Rookie Team and ECAC All-First Team. She was also named a finalist for ECAC Rookie of the Year and Defender of the Year.

During the 2021–22 season, in her sophomore year, she recorded eight goals and 22 assists in 37 games. Following the season she was named to the ECAC All-Second Team. During the 2022–23 NCAA season, in her junior year, she recorded six goals and 20 assists in 40 games. She led all defenders with 121 shots on goal.

During the 2023–24 season, in her senior year, she recorded 14 goals and 25 assists in 40 games. Her 14 goals tied for the team lead, while her 39 points were tied for the team lead. Following the season she was named a unanimous selection to the ECAC All-First Team, the only player to earn unanimous selection, and was named the ECAC Defender of the Year. She was also named to the First Team All-USCHO, and a First Team All-American.

During the 2024–25 season, as a graduate student, she recorded 12 goals and 27 assists in 40 games. Following the season she was named to the ECAC All-First Team.

=== Professional ===
On June 24, 2025, Gosling was drafted fourth overall by the Montreal Victoire in the 2025 PWHL Draft. On October 10, 2025, she signed a three-year contract with the Victoire. During the 2025–26 season, she recorded three goals and 16 assists in 30 regular season games, and one goal and two assists in nine games during the 2026 Walter Cup playoffs to help the Victoire win the Walter Cup. Following the season she was named to the PWHL All-Star Second Team and All-Rookie Team.

During the league's expansion to 12 teams ahead of the 2026–27 season, she was left unprotected by the Victoire and signed a three-year contract with the Hamilton Havoc on June 6, 2026.

== International play ==
Medal record

Representing Canada

Ice hockey

World Championship
| Gold medal – first place | 2024 United States | |
| Silver medal – second place | 2026 Denmark | |

World U18 Championship
| Gold medal – first place | 2019 Japan | |
| Silver medal – second place | 2020 Slovakia | |

On December 10, 2018, Gosling was selected to represent Canada at the 2019 IIHF World Women's U18 Championship. During the tournament she recorded one assist in five games and won a gold medal. She again represented Canada at the 2020 IIHF World Women's U18 Championship where she recorded one goal in five games and won a silver medal.

On March 7, 2024, she was selected to represent senior national at the 2024 IIHF Women's World Championship. She made her senior national team debut and was scoreless in seven games and won a gold medal.

== Personal life ==
Gosling was born to Peter and Wendy Gosling, and has a brother, Braydon and a sister, Gabby. Her cousins, Katelyn Gosling and Julia Gosling, are both professional ice hockey players.

== Career statistics ==
=== Regular season and playoffs ===
| | | | Regular season | | | | | Playoffs |
| Season | Team | League | GP | G | A | Pts | PIM | GP | G | A | Pts | PIM |
|---|---|---|---|---|---|---|---|---|---|---|---|---|
| 2020–21 | Clarkson University | ECAC | 19 | 4 | 10 | 14 | 18 | — | — | — | — | — |
| 2021–22 | Clarkson University | ECAC | 37 | 8 | 22 | 30 | 18 | — | — | — | — | — |
| 2022–23 | Clarkson University | ECAC | 40 | 6 | 20 | 26 | 15 | — | — | — | — | — |
| 2023–24 | Clarkson University | ECAC | 40 | 14 | 25 | 39 | 20 | — | — | — | — | — |
| 2024–25 | Clarkson University | ECAC | 40 | 12 | 27 | 39 | 29 | — | — | — | — | — |
| 2025–26 | Montréal Victoire | PWHL | 30 | 3 | 16 | 19 | 29 | 9 | 1 | 2 | 3 | 6 |
| PWHL totals | | | 30 | 3 | 16 | 19 | 29 | 9 | 1 | 2 | 3 | 6 |

=== International ===
| Year | Team | Event | Result | GP | G | A | Pts | PIM |
|---|---|---|---|---|---|---|---|---|
| 2019 | Canada | U18 | 1st place, gold medalist(s) | 5 | 0 | 1 | 1 | 2 |
| 2020 | Canada | U18 | 2nd place, silver medalist(s) | 5 | 1 | 0 | 1 | 4 |
| 2024 | Canada | WC | 1st place, gold medalist(s) | 7 | 0 | 0 | 0 | 2 |
| Junior totals | | | | 10 | 1 | 1 | 2 | 6 |
| Senior totals | | | | 7 | 0 | 0 | 0 | 2 |

== Awards and honours ==
| Honours | Year |
College
| ECAC All-Rookie Team | 2021 |
| ECAC All-First Team | 2021 |
| ECAC All-Second Team | 2022 |
| ECAC All-First Team | 2024 |
| ECAC Defender of the Year | 2024 |
| All-USCHO.com First Team | 2024 |
| CCM/AHCA First Team All-American | 2024 |
PWHL
| Walter Cup champion | 2026 |
| All-Rookie Team | 2026 |
| All-Second Team | 2026 |
