= 2012–13 Yale Bulldogs women's ice hockey season =

- Conference: ECAC Hockey

Rankings
- USA Today/USA Hockey Magazine: Not ranked
- USCHO.com/CBS College Sports: Not ranked

Record

Coaches and captains
- Head coach: Joakim Flygh
- Assistant coaches: Jessica Koizumi

The Yale Bulldogs represented Yale University in ECAC women's ice hockey.

== Offseason ==
=== Recruiting ===
Player	Nationality	Position	Notes
Ali Austin	United States	Defense	
Janelle Ferrara	United States	Forward	
Rachelle Graham	Canada	Goaltender	
Jamie Haddad	United States	Forward	
Kate Martini	Canada	Defense	
Hanna Astrom	Sweden	Forward	

== Regular season ==
=== Standings ===
#	Team	ECAC record								Overall						
#	Team	PTS	GP	W	L	T	Pct	GF	GA	GP	W	L	T	Pct	GF	GA
1	Cornell	37	22	18	3	1	0.841	84	27	34	27	6	1	0.809	131	55
2t	Clarkson	36	22	18	4	0	0.818	61	28	38	28	10	0	0.737	110	68
2t	Harvard	36	22	17	3	2	0.818	77	25	34	24	7	3	0.750	113	41
4	Quinnipiac	29	22	13	6	3	0.659	66	41	36	20	12	4	0.611	103	75
5	St. Lawrence	28	22	12	6	4	0.636	65	54	38	19	14	5	0.566	98	92
6	Dartmouth	26	22	11	7	4	0.591	58	49	31	16	10	5	0.597	84	71
7	Rensselaer	18	22	8	12	2	0.409	48	59	36	10	22	4	0.333	76	99
8	Colgate	15	22	6	13	3	0.341	40	70	35	11	21	3	0.357	66	122
9	Princeton	14	22	6	14	2	0.318	46	75	29	11	16	2	0.414	66	90
10	Yale	11	22	4	15	3	0.250	35	64	29	5	21	3	0.224	41	88
11	Brown	10	22	5	17	0	0.227	31	61	27	6	20	1	0.241	42	76
12	Union	4	22	0	18	4	0.091	15	73	34	7	23	4	0.265	41	105

Source: ecachockey.com

=== Schedule ===
Date	Opponent	Result	Record	Conference Record

== Roster ==
Number	Player	Position	Height
2	Ashley Dunbar	Forward	5-2
3	Ali Austin	Defense	5-5
4	Tara Tomimoto	Defense	5-5
5	Jackie Raines	Forward	5-4
6	Stephanie Mock	Forward	5-4
7	Jamie Gray	Defense	5-5
8	Alyssa Zupon	Forward	5-6
9	Danielle Moncion	Forward	5-8
10	Jamie Haddad	Forward	5-7
11	Natalie Wedell	Defense	5-8
12	Janelle Ferrara	Forward	5-6
13	Emily DesMeules	Defense	5-9
14	Paige Decker	Forward	5-8
16	Lynn Kennedy	Forward	5-5
18	Hanna Astrom	Forward	5-9
19	Jenna Ciotti	Forward	5-3
20	Jen Matichuk	Forward	5-5
21	Patricia McGauley	Forward	5-4
22	Madi Murray	Defense	5-6
23	Aurora Kennedy	Defense	5-8
24	Kate Martini	Defense	5-6
25	Kelsey Summers	Defense/Forward	5-6
32	Jaimie Leonoff	Goaltender	5-7
35	Rachelle Graham	Goaltender	5-10
39	Erin Callahan	Goaltender	5-7
