= 2012–13 Colgate Raiders women's ice hockey season =

- Conference: ECAC

Rankings
- USA Today/USA Hockey Magazine: Not ranked
- USCHO.com/CBS College Sports: Not ranked

Record

Coaches and captains
- Head coach: Greg Fargo
- Assistant coaches: Josh Sciba

The Colgate Raiders represented Colgate University in ECAC women's ice hockey. The Raiders are attempting to participate in the NCAA Frozen Four for the first time in school history.

== Offseason ==
- May 14: The Raiders have announced the hiring of Greg Fargo as the new women's head coach. Prior to Colgate, Fargo was the head coach of the Elmira women's hockey program.

=== Recruiting ===
| Player | Nationality | Position | Notes |
| Jenny Currie | United States | Forward | |
| Katelyn Parker | United States | Forward | Competed at Gilmour Academy |
| Cacey Macjlejewski | United States | Defense | |
| Nicole Gass | Canada | Defense | Attended Ontario Hockey Academy |
| Aimee DiBella | Canada | Defense | |
| Ashlynne Rando | United States | Goaltender | |

== Exhibition ==
| Date | Opponent | Result | Goal scorers |
| Sept. 23/12 | Etobicoke (PWHL) | | |

== Regular season ==
=== Standings ===
| # | Team | ECAC record | | | | | | | | Overall | | | | | | |
| # | Team | PTS | GP | W | L | T | Pct | GF | GA | GP | W | L | T | Pct | GF | GA |
|---|---|---|---|---|---|---|---|---|---|---|---|---|---|---|---|---|
| 1 | Cornell | 37 | 22 | 18 | 3 | 1 | 0.841 | 84 | 27 | 34 | 27 | 6 | 1 | 0.809 | 131 | 55 |
| 2t | Clarkson | 36 | 22 | 18 | 4 | 0 | 0.818 | 61 | 28 | 38 | 28 | 10 | 0 | 0.737 | 110 | 68 |
| 2t | Harvard | 36 | 22 | 17 | 3 | 2 | 0.818 | 77 | 25 | 34 | 24 | 7 | 3 | 0.750 | 113 | 41 |
| 4 | Quinnipiac | 29 | 22 | 13 | 6 | 3 | 0.659 | 66 | 41 | 36 | 20 | 12 | 4 | 0.611 | 103 | 75 |
| 5 | St. Lawrence | 28 | 22 | 12 | 6 | 4 | 0.636 | 65 | 54 | 38 | 19 | 14 | 5 | 0.566 | 98 | 92 |
| 6 | Dartmouth | 26 | 22 | 11 | 7 | 4 | 0.591 | 58 | 49 | 31 | 16 | 10 | 5 | 0.597 | 84 | 71 |
| 7 | Rensselaer | 18 | 22 | 8 | 12 | 2 | 0.409 | 48 | 59 | 36 | 10 | 22 | 4 | 0.333 | 76 | 99 |
| 8 | Colgate | 15 | 22 | 6 | 13 | 3 | 0.341 | 40 | 70 | 35 | 11 | 21 | 3 | 0.357 | 66 | 122 |
| 9 | Princeton | 14 | 22 | 6 | 14 | 2 | 0.318 | 46 | 75 | 29 | 11 | 16 | 2 | 0.414 | 66 | 90 |
| 10 | Yale | 11 | 22 | 4 | 15 | 3 | 0.250 | 35 | 64 | 29 | 5 | 21 | 3 | 0.224 | 41 | 88 |
| 11 | Brown | 10 | 22 | 5 | 17 | 0 | 0.227 | 31 | 61 | 27 | 6 | 20 | 1 | 0.241 | 42 | 76 |
| 12 | Union | 4 | 22 | 0 | 18 | 4 | 0.091 | 15 | 73 | 34 | 7 | 23 | 4 | 0.265 | 41 | 105 |

Source: ecachockey.com

=== Schedule ===
| Date | Opponent | Result | Record | Conference Record |
| Sept. 28 | @ Minnesota | 0-7 | 0-1-0 | 0-0-0 |
| Sept. 29 | @ Minnesota | 0-11 | 0-2-0 | 0-0-0 |
| Oct. 5 | Northeastern | 0-4 | 0-3-0 | 0-0-0 |
| Oct. 6 | New Hampshire | 1-4 | 0-4-0 | 0-0-0 |
| Oct. 12 | Connecticut | 5-3 | 1-4-0 | 0-0-0 |
| Oct. 13 | Connecticut | 4-1 | 2-4-0 | 0-0-0 |
| Oct. 26 | Yale | 0-3 | 2-5-0 | 0-1-0 |
| Oct. 27 | Brown | 1-4 | 2-6-0 | 0-2-0 |
| Nov. 2 | Quinnipiac | 1-2 | 2-7-0 | 0-3-0 |
| Nov. 3 | Princeton | | | |
| Nov. 9 | RIT | | | |
| Nov. 16 | Cornell | | | |
| Nov. 17 | Cornell | | | |
| Nov. 23 | Harvard | | | |
| Nov. 24 | Dartmouth | | | |
| Nov. 30 | St. Lawerence | | | |
| Dec. 1 | Clarkson | | | |
| Jan. 5 | Vermont | | | |
| Jan. 6 | Vermont | | | |
| Jan. 8 | Syracuse | | | |
| Jan. 12 | RIT | | | |
| Jan. 18 | Clarkson | | | |
| Jan. 19 | St. Lawrence | | | |
| Jan. 25 | Brown | | | |
| Jan. 26 | Yale | | | |
| Feb. 1 | Rensselaer | | | |
| Feb. 2 | Union | | | |
| Feb. 8 | Princeton | | | |
| Feb. 9 | Quinnipiac | | | |
| Feb. 15 | Dartmouth | | | |
| Feb. 16 | Harvard | | | |
| Feb. 22 | Union | | | |
| Feb. 23 | Rennsselaer | | | |

== Roster ==
| Number | Player | Position | Height | Former team |
