= Bishop Kearney High School (Irondequoit, New York) =

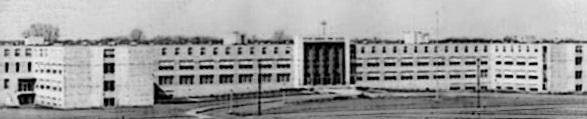

Location
- 125 Kings Highway South; Rochester (Irondequoit, New York), (Monroe County), New York 14617; United States; 43°12′6″N 77°34′43″W

Information
- Type: Private, Coeducational
- Motto: Fac Omnia Bene (Do All Things Well)
- Denomination: Roman Catholic
- Established: 1962; 64 years ago
- Founder: Edmund Rice
- CEEB code: 334773
- NCES School ID: 00929483
- President: Paul Colontino
- Grades: 6–12
- Enrollment: 315 (2018)
- Student to teacher ratio: 15:1
- Campus size: 42 acres (17 ha)
- Campus type: suburban
- Colors: Blue, Black and White
- Team name: The Kings, "Lady" Kings (girl teams)
- Accreditation: Middle States Association of Colleges and Schools
- Founding Orders: Christian Brothers and School Sisters of Notre Dame
- Associations: NCEA
- Chief executive officer: Thomas O'Neil
- Website: www.bkhs.org

Bishop Kearney High School is a Roman Catholic educational institution in Irondequoit, New York, USA, a suburb of Rochester. It is a private high school with a middle school subdivision, serving students in grades 6 through 12. The school occupies a 42-acre (170,000 m^{2}) campus near the geographic center of Irondequoit, just 1 mile from Lake Ontario, and 10 minutes away from downtown Rochester.

== Origin and history ==
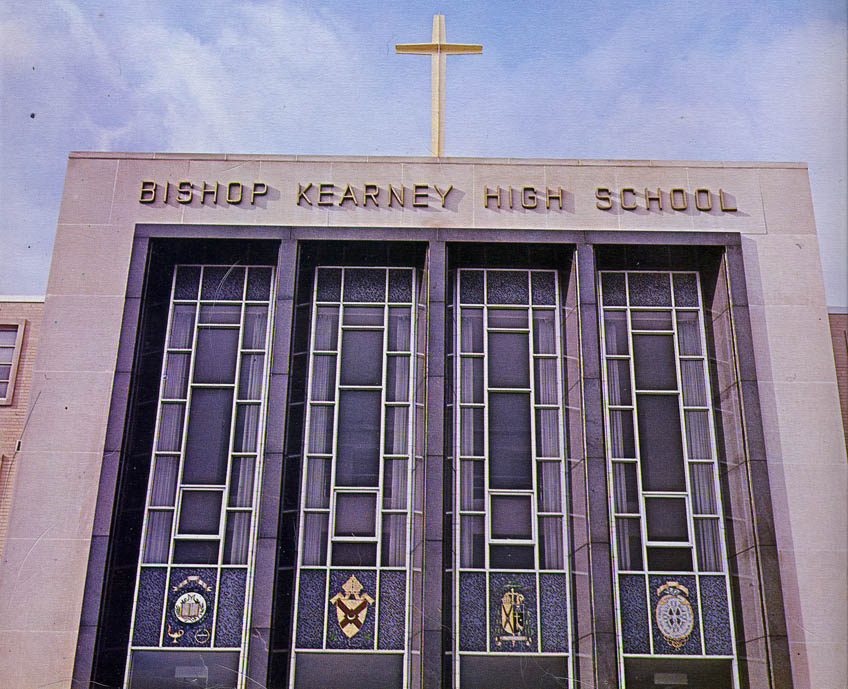
The school's façade, as photographed in the 1960s

Bishop Kearney High School was co-founded by Edmund Rice and the Congregation of Christian Brothers of Ireland, with the School Sisters of Notre Dame. The school was named after James E. Kearney of the Roman Catholic Diocese of Rochester. It opened in 1962, accepting only freshmen at the time. Those freshmen remained the school's upperclassmen throughout their tenure, so they became the first graduates in 1966. It was opened at the same time as a nearly identical sister school, Cardinal Mooney High School, which closed in 1989. The school's first principal was Joseph M. Clark of the Congregation of Christian Brothers of Ireland.

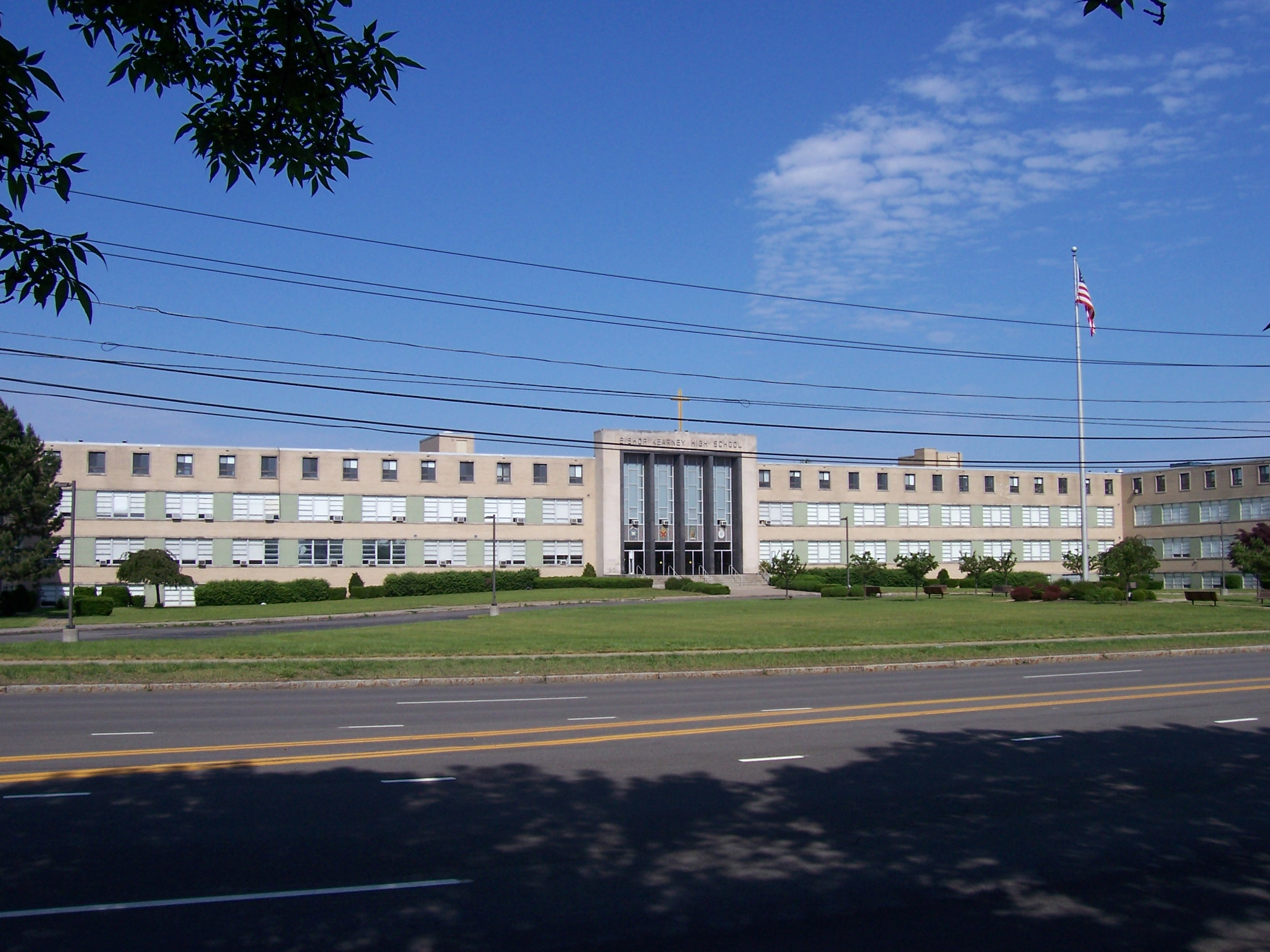
Front view

== Recent events ==
On February 13, 2007, the school announced that local billionaire Tom Golisano would be donating a substantial amount to the school for improvements in technology. The money will allow the school to provide every student with a laptop computer, as well as fund a wireless network, digital projection systems, video conferencing systems, and interactive whiteboards, with the stated goal of making the school "the most technologically advanced high school" in the country. The school will also be making curriculum enhancements with its College Prep Plus, to "better prepare students for the working world," including work-scholarship opportunities with local colleges and businesses. The donation has prompted the school to announce a pending name change, to "Bishop Kearney High School / A Golisano Education Partner."

On February 19, 2014, Tom Golisano offered to rescue the school's building from a bankruptcy filing by the founding Christian Brothers. Golisano offered $3.4 million to buy the 200,000-square-foot building and the 42 acres of surrounding property, with the stated intention of maintaining the school's existing educational mission.

From 2015 to 2016, the school renovated the former dormitory space of the Irish Christian Brothers, on the third floor of the north half of the building. This was converted into residence space for an elite girls hockey program — with 21 dorms accommodating 42 players. The players room at and attend classes at Bishop Kearney, and participate in the hockey program — run through LEGACY Global Hockey — titled "Selects Academy at Bishop Kearney". The program launched in August 2016 with a 16-and-under team (U-16) team — followed by a U-19 team in 2017 — each with about 20 girls. The program recruits players from across the United States and Canada, and play their season from September to March, and competes against teams nationally (not through Section V Athletics).

== Notable alumni ==
- Quentin Gause (2011), NFL and CFL football player.
- Thomas Bryant (2015 - transferred), basketball player, second-round selection in 2017 NBA draft.
- Brian Fobbs (2016), professional basketball player
- Michaela Hesová, professional ice hockey player
- Pamela Melroy (1979), former NASA astronaut, past deputy administrator of NASA.
- Quinton Rose (2016), former college basketball player.
- Nahziah Carter (2017), college basketball player.
- Rene Ingoglia former National Football League player and sports broadcaster for ESPN.
- Don Zientara American record producer and musician. (1966)
- Tom Keegan (1977), sportswriter and author who was a columnist at the Boston Herald.
- Kamil Witkowski Polish soccer player.
- Mike Foley (1972), 41st Lieutenant Governor of Nebraska.
- Michael J. Critelli (1966), former chairman and CEO (1996-2007) of Pitney Bowes.
- Brian King (2000), Director of the Food and Drug Administration’s Center for Tobacco Products (CTP).
- Haley Winn - 2026 Team USA Women's Ice Hockey Olympic Gold Medalist
- Caroline Harvey (ice hockey) - 2026 Team USA Women's Ice Hockey Olympic Gold Medalist, 2022 Team USA Ice Hockey Olympic Silver Medalist, 3 time NCAA Champion with the University of Wisconsin.
- Laila Edwards - 2026 Team USA Women's Ice Hockey Olympic Gold Medalist, first Black woman to play ice hockey for Team USA at the Olympics, first Black woman on Team USA to win an Olympic Gold Medal in ice hockey, 3 time NCAA Champion with the University of Wisconsin.

== Athletics ==
Bishop Kearney is well known for its athletics programs in Section V, and the new Selects Girls Hockey program.

BK has won Section V championship tournaments 59 times over school history. Recent championships include football [class D] (2015), football [C] (2016), girls' volleyball [C] (2016), softball [C] (2017), boys' soccer [C-2] (2017), girls basketball [AA] (2018). boys soccer 2022

Bishop Kearney has claimed New York State titles four times:

- boys' basketball in 2009 and 2013.
- girls' basketball in 2013.
- girls' softball in 2017.

=== Athletics facilities ===
Brother Clark Stadium is an athletics field at the school. The seating capacity of the field, including portable bleachers, is 4,500. It is one of the few high school facilities to have hosted a major league sports team, having been the home field of the Rochester Rattlers of Major League Lacrosse from 2003 to 2005, prior to the Rattlers move to PAETEC Park for the 2006 season.

Preceded by Frontier Field	Home of the Rochester Rattlers; 2003 – 2005	Succeeded by PAETEC Park
