= 2012–13 Harvard Crimson women's ice hockey season =

- Conference: ECAC
- Home ice: Bright Hockey Arena

Rankings
- USA Today/USA Hockey Magazine: Not ranked
- USCHO.com/CBS College Sports: Not ranked

Record

Coaches and captains
- Head coach: Katey Stone

The Harvard Crimson represented Harvard University in ECAC women's ice hockey.

== Offseason ==
=== Recruiting ===
Player	Nationality	Position	Notes
Dylanne Crugnale	United States	Forward	Attended North American Hockey Academy
Miye D’Oench	United States	Forward	Hails from New York, NY
Abigail Harris	United States	Defense	From Bowling Green, Ohio
Jessica Harvey	United States	Forward	
Emerance Maschmeyer	Canada	Goaltender	Claimed gold with Canadian team at IIHF U18 Women’s Worlds
Mary Parker	United States	Forward	Attended Noble and Greenough School
Molly Tissenbaum	Canada	Goaltender	Played at Premier Elite Athletics Collegiate

== Regular season ==
=== Standings ===
#	Team	ECAC record								Overall						
#	Team	PTS	GP	W	L	T	Pct	GF	GA	GP	W	L	T	Pct	GF	GA
1	Cornell	37	22	18	3	1	0.841	84	27	34	27	6	1	0.809	131	55
2t	Clarkson	36	22	18	4	0	0.818	61	28	38	28	10	0	0.737	110	68
2t	Harvard	36	22	17	3	2	0.818	77	25	34	24	7	3	0.750	113	41
4	Quinnipiac	29	22	13	6	3	0.659	66	41	36	20	12	4	0.611	103	75
5	St. Lawrence	28	22	12	6	4	0.636	65	54	38	19	14	5	0.566	98	92
6	Dartmouth	26	22	11	7	4	0.591	58	49	31	16	10	5	0.597	84	71
7	Rensselaer	18	22	8	12	2	0.409	48	59	36	10	22	4	0.333	76	99
8	Colgate	15	22	6	13	3	0.341	40	70	35	11	21	3	0.357	66	122
9	Princeton	14	22	6	14	2	0.318	46	75	29	11	16	2	0.414	66	90
10	Yale	11	22	4	15	3	0.250	35	64	29	5	21	3	0.224	41	88
11	Brown	10	22	5	17	0	0.227	31	61	27	6	20	1	0.241	42	76
12	Union	4	22	0	18	4	0.091	15	73	34	7	23	4	0.265	41	105

Source: ecachockey.com

=== Schedule ===
Date	Opponent	Result	Record	Conference Record

== Roster ==
Number	Player	Position	Height	Shoots
2	Josephine Pucci	Defense	5-8	Right
3	Sarah Edney	Defense	5-6	Left
4	Hillary Hayssen	Defense	5-8	Right
5	Kelsey Romatowski	Forward	5-9	Left
9	Lyndsey Fry	Forward	5-8	Right
10	Gina MacDonald	Forward	5-4	Right
12	Samantha Reber	Forward	5-9	Left
14	Jillian Dempsey	Forward	5-4	Left
15	Mary Parker	Forward	5-9	Left
16	Marissa Gedman	Defense	5-9	Left
17	Kaitlin Spurling	Forward	5-9	Left
18	Abigail Harris	Defense	5-5	Right
19	Miye D’Oench	Forward	5-4	Right
20	Michelle Picard	Defense	5-6	Left
21	Jessica Harvey	Forward	5-9	Right
23	Dylanne Crugnale	Forward	5-8	Left
29	Elizabeth Parker	Forward	5-9	Left
35	Molly Tissenbaum	Goaltender	5-7	Left
38	Emerance Maschmeyer	Goaltender	5-6	Left

== Awards and honors ==
- Jillian Dempsey, ECAC Player of the Week (Week of January 7, 2013)
