= 2012–13 Dartmouth Big Green women's ice hockey season =

- Conference: ECAC
- Home ice: Thompson Arena

Rankings
- USA Today/USA Hockey Magazine: Not ranked
- USCHO.com/CBS College Sports: Not ranked

Record

Coaches and captains
- Head coach: Mark Hudak

The Dartmouth Big Green represented Dartmouth College in ECAC women's ice hockey.

== Offseason ==
=== Recruiting ===
Player	Nationality	Position	Notes
Laura Stacey	Canada	Forward	Member of Canadian Under-22 National Team; Great granddaughter of King Clancy
Lindsay Allen	Canada	Forward	Competed with the Toronto Jr. Aeros (PWHL)
Olivia Whitford	Canada	Defense	Member of the Burlington Barracudas
Ailish Forfar	Canada	Forward	Played for the Toronto Jr. Aeros

== Regular season ==
=== Standings ===
#	Team	ECAC record								Overall						
#	Team	PTS	GP	W	L	T	Pct	GF	GA	GP	W	L	T	Pct	GF	GA
1	Cornell	37	22	18	3	1	0.841	84	27	34	27	6	1	0.809	131	55
2t	Clarkson	36	22	18	4	0	0.818	61	28	38	28	10	0	0.737	110	68
2t	Harvard	36	22	17	3	2	0.818	77	25	34	24	7	3	0.750	113	41
4	Quinnipiac	29	22	13	6	3	0.659	66	41	36	20	12	4	0.611	103	75
5	St. Lawrence	28	22	12	6	4	0.636	65	54	38	19	14	5	0.566	98	92
6	Dartmouth	26	22	11	7	4	0.591	58	49	31	16	10	5	0.597	84	71
7	Rensselaer	18	22	8	12	2	0.409	48	59	36	10	22	4	0.333	76	99
8	Colgate	15	22	6	13	3	0.341	40	70	35	11	21	3	0.357	66	122
9	Princeton	14	22	6	14	2	0.318	46	75	29	11	16	2	0.414	66	90
10	Yale	11	22	4	15	3	0.250	35	64	29	5	21	3	0.224	41	88
11	Brown	10	22	5	17	0	0.227	31	61	27	6	20	1	0.241	42	76
12	Union	4	22	0	18	4	0.091	15	73	34	7	23	4	0.265	41	105

Source: ecachockey.com

=== Schedule ===
Date	Opponent	Result	Record	Conference Record

== Roster ==
Number	Player	Position	Height
1	Whitney Woodcox	Goaltender	5-9
2	Margaux Sharp	Defense	5-9
3	Ali Winkel	Forward	5-7
4	Zoe Brennan	Defense	5-8
6	Jenna Hobeika	Forward	5-4
7	Camille Dumais	Forward	5-8
9	Jessica Gagner	Forward	5-7
10	Laura Stacey	Forward	5-10
11	Morgan Illikainen	Defense	5-8
12	Lisa Berreman	Defense	5-9
13	Catherine Berghuis	Forward	5-8
14	Lindsay Allen	Forward	5-9
16	Lauren Kelly	Defense	5-8
17	Samantha Zeiss	Forward	5-6
18	Sally Komisarek	Forward	5-7
19	Reagan Fischer	Forward	5-8
20	Olivia Whitford	Defense	5-9
21	Abbie Lund	Forward	5-6
22	Karlee Odland	Forward	5-7
24	Sasha Nanji	Defense	5-6
27	Ailish Forfar	Forward	5-6
29	Katie Milligan	Goaltender	5-10
30	Lindsay Holdcroft	Goaltender	5-4

== Awards and honors ==
- Ailish Forfar, ECAC Rookie of the Week (Week of January 7, 2013)
