= 2012–13 Cornell Big Red women's ice hockey season =

- Conference: ECAC
- Home ice: Lynah Rink

Rankings
- USA Today/USA Hockey Magazine: Not ranked
- USCHO.com/CBS College Sports: Not ranked

Record
- Overall: 27-6-1
- Home: 17-1-1
- Road: 10-5-0

Coaches and captains
- Head coach: Doug Derragh
- Assistant coaches: Danielle Bilodeau; Edith Racine
- Captain: Lauriane Rougeau
- Alternate captain: Alyssa Gagliardi

The Cornell Big Red women's ice hockey program represented Cornell University during the 2012–13 NCAA Division I women's ice hockey season.

== Offseason ==
- July 18, 2012: Six players from the Big Red roster were invited to Hockey Canada's Under-22 Evaluation Camp. Among the players invited were Laura Fortino, Brianne Jenner, Hayleigh Cudmore, Jessica Campbell, Jillian Saulnier and Emily Fulton.

=== Recruiting ===
Player	Position	Nationality	Notes
Jess Brown	Forward	United States	Played with Katelyn Pippy on the Pittsburgh Junior Penguins. Teammate of Alyssa Gagliardi at Shattuck St. Mary's
Stefannie Moak	Goaltender	Canada	Will be second player on Big Red from Nova Scotia
Kelly Murray	Defense	Canada	Won gold at the 2011 Canada Winter Games
Victoria Pittens	Forward	Canada	Won silver medal at the 2011 Canada Winter Games
Cassandra Poudrier	Defense	Canada	Played for Canada at the 2011 Four Nations Cup
Morgan Richardson	Defense	Canada	Member of Team Canada at the 2012 IIHF Women's Worlds
Taylor Woods	Forward	Canada	Member of Team Canada at the 2012 IIHF Women's Worlds; Played with Notre Dame Hounds at Esso Cup
Anna Zorn	Forward	United States	Older sister Liz Zorn played for Cornell from 2006 to 2010

No.	Nat.	Player	Class	Pos	Height	DoB	Hometown	Previous team
2		Alyssa Gagliardi	Junior	D	5' 10" (1.78 m)		Raleigh, N.C.	Shattuck-St. Mary's
4		Kelly Murray	Freshman	D	5' 7" (1.7 m)		Calgary, AB	Edge School for Athletes
5		Cassandra Poudrier	Freshman	D	5' 5" (1.65 m)		Mont-Laurier, QC	Dawson College
6		Olivia Cook	Junior	F	5' 3" (1.6 m)		Akwesasne, St. Regis Mohawk Reservation	Nepean Wildcats
7		Lauriane Rougeau	Senior	D	5' 8" (1.73 m)		Beaconsfield, QC	Dawson College
8		Jessica Campbell	Junior	F	5' 4" (1.63 m)		Mellville, SK	Pursuit of Excellence
11		Brianne Jenner	Junior	F	5' 9" (1.75 m)		Oakville, ON	Team Canada U22
14		Victoria Pittens	Freshman	F	5' 4" (1.63 m)		Whitby, ON	Whitby Wolves
17		Emily Fulton	Sophomore	F	5' 5" (1.65 m)		Stratford, ON	Bluewater Hawks
18		Jess Brown	Freshman	F	5' 3" (1.6 m)		Cleveland, OH	Pittsburgh Jr. Penguins
19		Jillian Saulnier	Sophomore	F	5' 6" (1.68 m)		Halifax, NS	Team Canada U22
20		Anna Zorn	Freshman	F	5' 11" (1.8 m)		Churchville, NY	Rochester EDGE
21		Morgan Richardson	Freshman	D	5' 6" (1.68 m)		Ottawa, ON	Team Canada U18
22		Erin Barley-Maloney	Senior	F	5' 5" (1.65 m)		Raleigh, N.C.	University of Vermont
24		Hayleigh Cudmore	Junior	D	5' 4" (1.63 m)		Oakville, ON	Oakville Ice
25		Taylor Woods	Freshman	F	5' 2" (1.57 m)		Morden, MB	Team Canada U18
27		Monika Leck	Sophomore	F	5' 6" (1.68 m)		Nepean, ON	Ottawa Jr. Senators
30		Lauren Slebodnick	Junior	G	5' 8" (1.73 m)		Manchester, N.H.	Aurora Jr. Panthers
34		Katelyn Pippy	Sophomore	G	5' 10" (1.78 m)		Moon Township, PA	Pittsburgh Jr. Penguins
35		Stefannie Moak	Freshman	G	5' 7" (1.7 m)		Middle Sackville, NS	Metro Boston Pizza Midget AAA
77		Laura Fortino	Senior	D	5' 6" (1.68 m)		Hamilton, ON	Stoney Creek Jr. Sabres

== Regular season ==
=== Standings ===
#	Team	ECAC record								Overall						
#	Team	PTS	GP	W	L	T	Pct	GF	GA	GP	W	L	T	Pct	GF	GA
1	Cornell	37	22	18	3	1	0.841	84	27	34	27	6	1	0.809	131	55
2t	Clarkson	36	22	18	4	0	0.818	61	28	38	28	10	0	0.737	110	68
2t	Harvard	36	22	17	3	2	0.818	77	25	34	24	7	3	0.750	113	41
4	Quinnipiac	29	22	13	6	3	0.659	66	41	36	20	12	4	0.611	103	75
5	St. Lawrence	28	22	12	6	4	0.636	65	54	38	19	14	5	0.566	98	92
6	Dartmouth	26	22	11	7	4	0.591	58	49	31	16	10	5	0.597	84	71
7	Rensselaer	18	22	8	12	2	0.409	48	59	36	10	22	4	0.333	76	99
8	Colgate	15	22	6	13	3	0.341	40	70	35	11	21	3	0.357	66	122
9	Princeton	14	22	6	14	2	0.318	46	75	29	11	16	2	0.414	66	90
10	Yale	11	22	4	15	3	0.250	35	64	29	5	21	3	0.224	41	88
11	Brown	10	22	5	17	0	0.227	31	61	27	6	20	1	0.241	42	76
12	Union	4	22	0	18	4	0.091	15	73	34	7	23	4	0.265	41	105

Source: ecachockey.com

=== Schedule ===
Date	Opponent	Location	Time	Score	Record	Conference Record	Goal scorers
