= 2011–12 Calgary Dinos women's ice hockey season =

Carleton Invitational tournament champions Canada West champions CIS Women's Ice Hockey Champions
- Conference: 1 Canada West

Record
- Overall: 20-4-0

Coaches and captains
- Head coach: Danielle Goyette
- Assistant coaches: Kelly Bechard; Tara Hammer; Brenda Zubick

The 2011–12 Calgary Dinos women's ice hockey season represented a season of play in Canadian Interuniversity Sport women's ice hockey. The Dinos finished the season by winning the 2012 CIS Women's Ice Hockey Championship. It was the first CIS championship in program history.

== Offseason ==
- Iya Gavrilova, a member of the Russian national team since 2003, has been recruited to join the Calgary Dinos.

== Preseason ==
=== Carleton Ravens invitational tournament ===
Date	Teams	Rink	Score
Sept. 22	Calgary vs. Toronto	Carleton Rink B	Calgary 3 – Toronto 1
Sept. 23	Queen's vs. Calgary	Carleton Rink A	Calgary 6 – Queen's 1
Sept. 24	Calgary vs. Carleton	Carleton Rink A	Calgary 5 – Carleton 0
Sept. 25	Calgary vs. Ottawa	Carleton Rink A	Calgary 4 – Ottawa 2

== Regular season ==
- September 27, 2011: Hayley Wickenheiser was honoured as a CIS Top Eight Academic All-Canadian. She became the first Calgary Dinos student-athlete to earn the top academic honour in CIS since soccer player Kelly Matheson in 2000.

=== Season standings ===
2011–12 Canada West standings
	Overall				
	GP	W	L	OL	PTS
†* Calgary	24	20	4	0	40
Alberta	24	14	3	7	35
Saskatchewan	24	16	6	2	34
Lethbridge	24	14	8	2	30
Manitoba	24	12	8	4	28
Regina	24	7	15	2	16
UBC	24	1	21	2	4
Championship: Calgary † indicates conference regular season champion * indicates conference tournament champion

== Postseason ==
On February 25, 2012, Iya Gavrilova scored the game-winning goal in the deciding game of the 2012 Canada West tournament, as the Calgary Dinos claimed their first ever tournament title.

== Awards and honors ==
- Hayley Wickenheiser, Top 8 Academic All-Canadians
- Amanda Tapp, CIS Championship Most Valuable Player
- Amanda Tapp, Canada West female athlete of the week (Week of March 13, 2012)

=== Canada West All-Stars ===
- 2012 Canada West First Team All-Star: Iya Gavrilova, Forward
- 2012 Canada West First Team All-Star: Stephanie Ramsay, Forward
- 2012 Canada West First Team All-Star: Hayley Wickenheiser, Forward
- 2012 Canada West Second Team All-Star: Melissa Zubick, Forward
