= 2010 in women's ice hockey =

The following are the women's ice hockey events of the year 2010 throughout the world.

== Champions ==
- 2010 Clarkson Cup: Minnesota Whitecaps
- 2010 Four Nations Cup: Canada
- 2010 IIHF World Women's U18 Championship: Canada
- 2010 MLP Nations Cup: Canada
- 2010 Vancouver Olympics: Canada
- NCAA women's Frozen Four: Minnesota Duluth

== Events ==
=== January to March ===
- January 1: Jayna Hefford scored the only goal in the shootout goal (Charline Labonté stopped all three American shooters) as Canada beat the U.S. by a score of 3–2. Before the match, Hefford was honoured for reaching the 200-game plateau in November. The game was played in front of 16,347 fans at Scotiabank Place. It was the largest Canadian crowd to watch a women's hockey game, surpassing the previous mark of 15,163 set Jan. 26, 1998 at the Calgary Saddledome.
- January 10: Vicki Bendus scored a goal and added two assists for the Canadian national women's under-22 team in the gold medal game of the 2010 MLP Cup. Canada defeated Switzerland, 9–0 in Ravensburg, Germany. The Canadian team won all four of their games by a combined score of 24–4, and secured their seventh goal medal in the past eight years. In three games, Bendus, Jesse Scanzano and Bailey Bram (from the Mercyhurst Lakers women's ice hockey team) combined for seven goals and 18 points. Benuds and Bram were tied for the tournament lead in scoring, and Bendus was named the tournament's top forward.
- February 4: The 2009–10 Finland women's national ice hockey team played the USA in an exhibition match in Colorado Springs, Colorado. The US won by a 5–1 mark.
- February 14: Canada defeated Slovakia by a record-setting score of 18–0 in their opening game of the 2010 Vancouver Olympic Winter Games on Saturday. Jayna Hefford and Meghan Agosta scored three goals each for Canada who set a record for the most lopsided win women's Olympic hockey tournament history. Canada also held the previous record for the biggest blowout, a 16–0 demolition of host Italy at the Torino 2006 Olympic Games. Hefford finished with a game-high six points in front of a crowd of 16,496 at the Canada Hockey Place arena. Slovakia was making their first appearance in the women's tournament as they were promoted to the top level after winning the qualifying event. Slovakia was outshot 67–9.
- February 16: The undefeated McGill Martlets of Canadian Interuniversity Sport are the No. 1 ranked team for the 38th consecutive week, dating back to Nov. 6, 2007.
- On February 17, Hayley Wickenheiser became the all-time leading Olympic goal scorer as Canada defeated Sweden 13–1. Wickenheiser reached her record total of 16 career Olympic goals by scoring once on Wednesday as Canada followed up their 18–0 win over Slovakia and 10–1 defeat of Switzerland. In addition, Meghan Agosta scored a record third Olympic hat-trick in the match against Sweden to move on to eight goals in this tournament, equalling Danielle Goyette's record for most goals in one Olympic tournament, set in 1998.
- February 25: In the bronze medal game, Karoliina Rantamäki scored in overtime as Finland beat Sweden 3–2. Heidi Pelttari and Michelle Karvinen also scored for Finland. Noora Rätyä made 16 saves for Finland who led 2–1 after the second period. Rantamäki scored the winner just 2:33 into the overtime.
- February 26: The International Olympic Committee announced that it would investigate the after ice celebration of several Canadian women's hockey players. The cause for the investigation is the concern about the use of beer and cigars on the ice in Vancouver. Another cause for concern was 18-year-old Marie-Philip Poulin was drinking alcohol on the ice (the legal drinking age in British Columbia is 19.) The team had been on the ice for more than 70 minutes after the medal ceremony (only media and arena staff were present). The antics drew heavy criticism from within, and outside of, Canada, but also considerable support from Canadian fans..
- February 28: After winning the gold medal, Canada has once again earned the number one ranking in the IIHF Women's World Ranking. Canada's men are also ranked first in the IIHF Men's World Ranking.
- March 14: The Alberta Pandas defeated the McGill Martlets to claim the 2010 Canadian Interuniversity Championship. The Pandas ended the Martlets historic 86-game unbeaten streak against CIS opponents. Said streak dated back to December 30, 2007. Panda skater Melody Howard's unassisted goal at 6:09 in the first period held up as the game-winning goal. Forward Alana Cabana scored the second goal of the game.
- March 21: The Minnesota Duluth Bulldogs defeated Cornell 3–2 in overtime to win its fifth Frozen Four. Jessica Wong scored the game-winning goal in overtime. Saara Tuominen and Jaime Rasmussen were the only players to have had two points in the championship game.
- March 21: Cornell goaltender Amanda Mazzotta set a record for most saves in an NCAA Championship game with 61 saves. The former record holder was Bulldog goaltender Patricia Sautter who had 41 saves in 2003.
- March 28: The Minnesota Whitecaps scored four goals against the Brampton Thunder as they became the first women's ice hockey team from the United States to claim the Clarkson Cup.

=== April to June ===
- April 3: Jessica Campbell scores overtime winner in a 5–4 overtime triumph over the United States as Canada won the 2010 IIHF World Women's U18 Championship.
- April 24: The Thunder Bay Queens from Ontario, Canada were victorious in the gold medal game of the 2010 Esso Cup. The Queens defeating the Notre Dame Hounds of Manitoba by a 4–3 mark in the Co-operators Centre at Evraz Place. The Edmonton Thunder beat the Regina Rebels in the bronze medal game.
- June 5: The Manitoba Maple Leafs joined the Western Women's Hockey League.
- June 7: Jessica Wong of the Minnesota Duluth Bulldogs was named Nova Scotia's Female Team Athlete of the Year by Sport Nova Scotia. Wong was given the Ricoh Sport Award. She scored a goal to win the 2010 NCAA title in triple-overtime, and she scored two goals to earn an Under-22 Women's World Championship gold.

=== July to September ===
- August 12: The Canadian Women's Hockey League hosted the 2010 CWHL Draft. The event was held at the Hockey Hall of Fame in Toronto at 7:00 pm.
- August 12: The CWHL announced that the city of Boston would receive an expansion team. The unnamed team would practice at Ristuccia Arena in Wilmington.
- September 11: The Centre Etienne Desmarteau in Montreal, Québec, named one of the rinks in the arena in Caroline Ouellette's honour.
- September 16, 2010: Hayley Wickenheiser announced that she would return to the University of Calgary to complete her Kinesiology degree. She also announced that she would join the Dinos women's hockey team.
- September 17: Former New Hampshire goaltender Erin Whitten was named head coach of the Boston expansion franchise.
- September 18: Canadian Olympic gold medallist Gillian Ferrari, a first-year Martlets player scored her first-ever CIS goal. It was on a 4-on-3 power play versus Wilfrid Laurier University.

=== October to December ===
- October 1: Mercyhurst Lakers player Meghan Agosta joined Jesse Scanzano as only the second Mercyhurst player to have 100 career assists. She picked up the assist in the second period.
- October 1: In her first game as a Minnesota Golden Gopher, Amanda Kessel registered four points (two goals, two assists). The following day, Kessel scored the game-winning goal as the Gophers won by a 3–0 score. The game against Clarkson marked the first time in school history that the Gophers opened a season against a ranked opponent.
- October 2: Olympic gold medallist Marie-Philip Poulin debuted with the Boston University Terriers women's ice hockey program. In her first game, she scored the first goal of her NCAA career. It was a 4–5 loss at North Dakota.
- October 8: Hayley Wickenheiser played in her first CIS game with the Calgary Dinos. She earned first star honours and had two goals and one assist.
- October 9: With a 1–0 shutout over Wayne State, the Minnesota Golden Gophers have not allowed a goal in 180 minutes. Dating back to the 2009–10 season, Minnesota has not allowed a goal in 200:45 minutes played.
- October 12: The WCHA conference had five of its teams ranked in the two national polls for the week. It is believed to be the first time five WCHA teams have ever been ranked among the top 10 in the nation at one time.
- October 15: Bailey Bram of the Mercyhurst Lakers registered two assists, including her 100th career point, in a game against the Bemidji State Beavers. She became the 11th Lakers player to crack the century mark in the 4–0 win.
- October 15: With her third shorthanded goal of the season on October 15, Boston University freshman Marie-Philip Poulin tied BU's single-season record for shorthanded tallies in just four games.
- October 16: In a 7–1 win against Connecticut, Isabel Menard recorded the first hat trick in Syracuse Orange women's ice hockey history (and added an assist).
- On October 23, 2010, Jocelyne Lamoureux of North Dakota, had a hat trick and one assist. In addition, one of her goals was the game-winning goal. The hat trick was the first by a North Dakota player since Cami Wooster in 2005.
- As the Mercyhurst Lakers went 6–1–0 in October 2010, freshman Christine Bestland scored four goals, including two in a 7–3 defeat of the Robert Morris Colonials. In addition, she had six assists. In her first game as a Laker, she scored a goal. She registered points in five of the seven games played and finished the month with a plus/minus rating of +13. For her efforts, she was recognized as College Hockey America's Rookie of the Month.
- November 8: Cammi Granato and Angela James became the first two women formally inducted into the Hockey Hall of Fame.
- November 12–13: Kelly Babstock made Quinnipiac Bobcats women's ice hockey history as she accounted for six of the seven goals scored over the weekend. Babstock registered back to back hat tricks against ECAC opponents (No. 10 ranked Harvard and Dartmouth). In addition, she is the first skater in Quinnipiac history to record two hat tricks in one season. As of November 14, Babstock led the team and the entire NCAA in goals (13) and points (27).
- November 13: The 1–0 shutout by the Connecticut Huskies on November 13 ended New Hampshire's 17-game unbeaten streak against the Huskies The Huskies penalty kill was a perfect 6-of-6 on the weekend. The shutout on November 13 marked the first time the Wildcats were shut out at home since Nov. 28, 2004 (by Mercyhurst), a streak of 109 consecutive home games.
- November 13: Rebecca Johnston scored the game-winning goal for Canada in a 3–2 overtime win to claim the 2010 Four Nations Cup.
- November 20–21: The Montreal Stars swept the Brampton Thunder in a 2-game series. The battle between the top two teams in the Canadian Women's Hockey League resulted in Montreal remaining undefeated. The November 20th game involved a pre-game salute. Montreal recognized Angela James, the head coach of Brampton, for her historic induction into the Hockey Hall of Fame, and held a minute of silence for the passing of Pat Burns at the Étienne Desmarteau Arena.
- November 21: Northeastern Huskies freshman Katie McSorley recorded her first career hat trick and added two assists as the Huskies prevailed by a 5–1 tally over the Providence Friars. The hat trick was the first hat trick for a Northeastern player since Julia Marty in 2008. It was also the first five-point game by a Husky since Chelsey Jones tallied five points against Maine on Dec. 3, 2006.
- Dec. 1: Northeastern Huskies freshman Rachel Llanes scored the first and last goal of the game in Northeastern's 4–0 win over New Hampshire with six shots on goal. It was her first-ever multi-goal game. Another freshman, Katie MacSorley scored a goal in the 4–0 win over New Hampshire. Florence Schelling made 22 saves for her third shutout of the season. With the win, Northeastern snapped a 27-game unbeaten streak (0–26–1) against New Hampshire. Their last win over New Hampshire was Jan. 21, 2001, a 2–1 win. In addition, the fact that it was a shutout victory marks the first over UNH in the history of the program.
- On Friday, Dec. 3 against Brown University, Kelly Babstock became Quinnipiac's all-time leader in goals scored in a season by netting her 16th goal of the season. Babstock's nation leading sixth game-winning goal against Yale on Saturday, Dec. 4 was part of a Bobcats 3–1 win.
- December 19: The Boston Blades came from behind to defeat Montreal. In doing so, they broke up Montreal's bid for an undefeated season. Boston goalie Mandy Cronin stopped 74 shots to lead Boston to victory. Montreal had an early 2–0 lead. In the 2nd period, Blades player Sam Faber scored on an assist by Jess Koizumi. In the third period, Koizumi would tie the game. With 3:24 to play in the game, Angela Ruggiero scored the game-winning goal. She was assisted by Sam Faber and Haley Moore.
- December 31: Charline Labonte required only 13 saves to post her 59th career shutout as McGill defeated the nationally ranked fifth overall Alberta Pandas by a 3–0 mark in the final game of the Bisons Holiday Classic tournament at Max Bell Arena. In the game, the Martlets held a 31–13 edge in shots. Gillian Ferrari was credited with the game-winner on the power-play at 5:49 of the first period. Jasmine Sheehan, a fifth-year defender scored the second goal of the game. Logan Murray, a freshman from Calgary, scored the last goal of the contest.

== Media ==
- Sports Illustrated listed Emmanuelle Blais as one of its "Faces In The Crowd" (in its April 19, 2010, issue). Part of the recognition is attributed to Blais earning the 2010 NCAA Frozen Four's Most Outstanding Player award on March 21. Blais is also a 2009–10 RBK First Team All-American. Her 1.59 points per game was the fifth highest total in the country. Her 32 goals led the NCAA, and she had a career high of 65 points.

== Awards and honors ==
- 2010 CIS Tournament MVP: Stephanie Ramsay, Alberta Pandas
  - 2010 CIS Tournament All-Stars
    - Goaltender: Dana Vinge, Alberta Pandas
    - Defense: Stephanie Ramsay, Alberta Pandas
    - Defense: Cathy Chartrand, McGill Martlets
    - Forward: Andrea Ironside, Laurier Golden Hawks
    - Forward: Leah Copeland, Alberta Pandas
    - Forward: Kyla Thurston, Saint Mary's Huskies
- 2010 Clarkson Cup
  - Megan Van Beusekom-Sweerin: Top goaltender in the tournament
  - Brooke White, Player of the Game, Minnesota, Clarkson Cup Final
  - Bobbi Jo Slusar, Player of the Game, Brampton, Clarkson Cup Final
  - Julie Chu, Minnesota, Tournament MVP.
  - Lori Dupuis, Brampton, Top forward in the tournament
  - Molly Engstrom, Brampton, Top defender in the tournament

- 2010 CWHL Awards
  - Most Valuable Player: Sabrina Harbec, Montréal
  - Angela James Bowl: Top Scorer Sabrina Harbec, Montréal
  - Outstanding Rookie: Danielle Blanchard, Vaughan
  - CWHL Top Players
    - Top Forward: Sabrina Harbec, Montréal
    - Top Defender: Annie Guay, Montréal
    - Top Goaltender: Laura Hosier, Brampton
- 2010 IIHF World Women's U18 Championship Directorate Awards
  - Best Goalkeeper: (United States) Alex Rigsby
  - Best Defenseman: (Canada) Brigette Lacquette
  - Best Forward: (United States) Kendall Coyne
- 2010 MLP Cup
  - Vicki Bendus, Top Forward
- 2010 NCAA awards

Award	Player	School
Patty Kazmaier Award	Vicki Bendus	Mercyhurst
CHA Most Valuable Player	Vicki Bendus	Mercyhurst
CHA Rookie of the Year	Isabel Menard	Syracuse
ECAC Most Valuable Player	Catherine White	Cornell
ECAC Rookie of the Year	Victoria Vigilanti	Quinnipiac
HEA Most Valuable Player	(Tie) Kelly Paton and Florence Schelling	New Hampshire and Northeastern
HEA Rookie of the Year	Kristina Lavoie	New Hampshire
WCHA Most Valuable Player	(Tie) Felicia Nelson, and Zuzana Tomcikova	St. Cloud State and Bemidji State
WCHA Rookie of the Year	Hokey Langan	Ohio State
Division I Women's Coach of the Year	Doug Derragh	Cornell

- 2010 NCAA All-America honors
  - First team

Player	Position	School
Noora Raty	G	Minnesota
Laura Fortino	D	Cornell
Anne Schleper	D	Minnesota
Emmanuelle Blais	F	Minnesota Duluth
Vicki Bendus	F	Mercyhurst
Kelly Paton	F	New Hampshire

- Second team

Player	Position	School
Florence Schelling	G	Northeastern
Courtney Birchard	D	New Hampshire
Lauriane Rougeau	D	Cornell
Felicia Nelson	F	St. Cloud State
Jesse Scanzano	F	Mercyhurst
Catherine White	F	Cornell

- 2010 Frozen Four Most Outstanding Player Emmanuelle Blais
- 2010 Vancouver Olympics
  - Olympic MVP – Meghan Agosta (CAN)
  - Media All-Star Team
    - G – Shannon Szabados
    - D – Angela Ruggiero
    - D – Molly Engstrom
    - F – Meghan Agosta
    - F – Marie-Philip Poulin
    - F – Jenny Potter
  - Directorate Awards
    - Best Goalkeeper: Shannon Szabados
    - Best Forward: Meghan Agosta
    - Best Defenceman: Molly Engstrom

== Deaths ==
- Daron Richardson (daughter of former NHL hockey player and Ottawa Senators assistant coach Luke Richardson) was a competitive ice hockey player in the Ottawa, Ontario, area who died on November 13, 2010. On November 18, 2010, 5,600 mourners attended a celebration of life ceremony for Daron at Scotiabank Place.
- Elizabeth Turgeon was 18 years old. She died December 23, 2010. She was a player of Colorado Select in the Junior Women's Hockey League. Turgeon was a member of U.S. Women's Under-18 team that won a gold medal in 2008.

== See also ==
- 2011 in women's ice hockey
