= Kaiya Gamble =

Canadian singer-songwriter

Kaiya Gamble is a Canadian pop singer and songwriter from Calgary, Alberta, notably recognized as a contestant on American Idol Season 22. She is one of two Canadians to receive a golden ticket and the first Albertan in the history of the show. Gamble was the Teen First Place Winner of the American Songwriter 2023 Song Contest.

== Career ==
Gamble has been performing since the age of nine years old. Her debut single, “Speak Out,” placed Top 3 in the 2021 International Women’s Freedom Song Contest and was nominated for Pop Single of the Year at the 2021 YYC Music Awards. She was also nominated for the Prophets of Music Emerging Artist of the Year at the YYC Music Awards that same year.

Gamble went on to release “I’m In It,” “Sweet Talker,” and “Polaroids,” all produced by CCMA and JUNO award-winning producers, Spencer Cheyne and Justin Kudding from Invoke Music. Nelson Jackson III played piano on “Polaroids.”

She won the American Songwriter 2023 Song Contest (Teen Category) for her single “Sweet Talker” and in 2024 she won the Massey Hall Youth Musician Commission’s Song Contest for “Polaroids.”

In 2024, Gamble signed a license agreement with Capstan Music Group. The first single released via Capstan is “Reckless,” which was co-written with hitmakers Ron Lopata, Simon Wilcox, and Thomas "Tawgs" Salter.

== Philanthropy ==
Gamble frequently performs in support of many charitable causes, including a monthly virtual performance as an ambassador for A Sound Life for the cancer ward in the Sydney Children's Hospital in Sydney, Australia. Gamble’s charitable commitment led her to be the first ever Canadian recipient of the Women of Inspiration Youth Excellence award in 2019.

In 2021, Gamble created and produced ‘Kaiya Live,’ a free online benefit concert benefitting three organizations: CINIM (Alberta), Wickfest (International), and A Sound Life (Australia). The event featured international artists Lenka and Edo Kahn.

== Discography ==
=== Singles ===
Year	Single
2020	"Speak Out"
2021	"I'm In It"
2022	"Sweet Talker"
2023	"What A Wonderful World - Live Acoustic" (cover)
2023	"Polaroids"
2025	"Reckless" “I Love You, I’m Sorry”
2026	”Ordinary” ”High School Play”

=== Music videos ===
Year	Single	Director
2021	"Speak Out"	Oliver Banyard
2022	"I'm In It"	Oliver Banyard
2022	"Sweet Talker"	Julianna Procyshen
2023	"What A Wonderful World - Live Acoustic"	Chris Grey
2023	"Polaroids"	Addie Robertson
2025	"Reckless"	Oliver Banyard
