= Calgary Dinos women's ice hockey =

Canadian university sports team

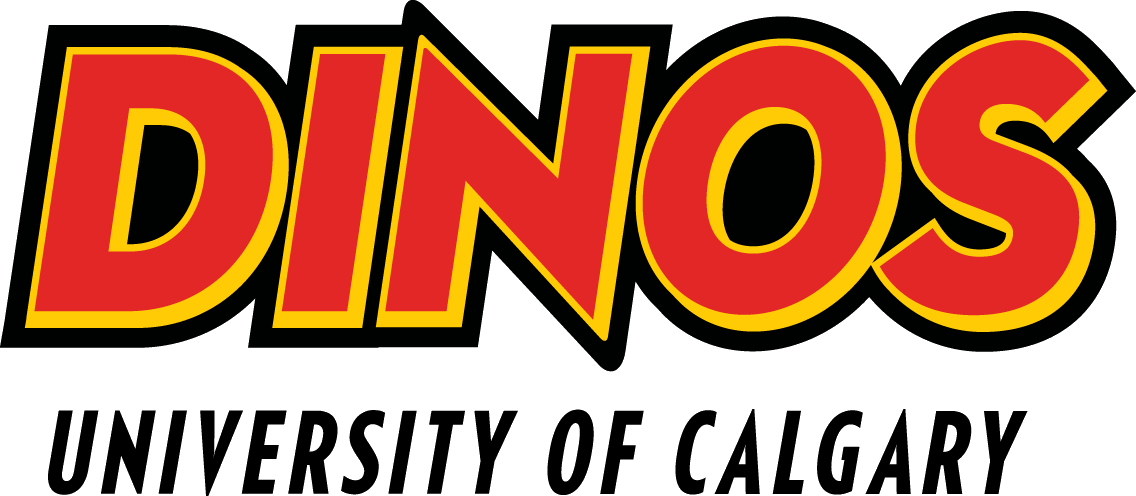
- University: University of Calgary
- Conference: Canada West
- Head coach: Josh Gosling; Since 2023–24 season
- Captain(s): Brooklyn Anderson
- Alternate captain(s): Jess Martens; Josie McLeod; Emma Tait
- Arena: Father David Bauer Arena; Calgary, Alberta
- Colors: Red and gold

U Sports tournament champions
- 2012

U Sports tournament appearances
- 2001, 2012, 2013, 2015, 2016

Conference tournament champions
- 2012

Conference regular season champions
- 1999, 2012, 2013

The Calgary Dinos women's ice hockey team represents the University of Calgary in U Sports women's ice hockey. The Dinos compete in the Canada West Conference in the U Sports athletic association. The program has won one conference championship in 2012 and have made five national championship appearances with a gold medal win in 2012.

== History ==
The women's hockey program started in 1995 when Shannon Miller and Kathy Berg founded the Olympic Oval High-Performance Training Program in Calgary for female players. The program was pitched to Cathy Priestner Allinger, the general manager of the Olympic Oval at the time, and the University of Calgary (U of C). Despite a lack of funding, there was interest for the program with the inclusion of women's hockey at the upcoming 1998 Winter Olympics. Priestner Allinger secured enough money to hire Miller as a full-time hockey coach and they were able to establish three skill levels (midget, junior, and senior) and two teams (Oval Lightning development team and Oval X-Treme elite team), and eventually the U of C Dinos varsity team.

Berg stepped in as the director of the program in 1997, the inaugural year of the Dinos women's hockey team, when Miller left to focus on coaching the Olympic team.

In February 1998, the U of C hosted the first Canada West championship. The Dinos won their first two games; 10–0 against the University of Lethbridge and 3–1 against the University of Saskatchewan before losing to the University of Alberta in the semifinals. They advanced to the bronze medal game, winning 5–1 against Saskatchewan for third place. Kelly Bechard was named to the All-stars tournament team.

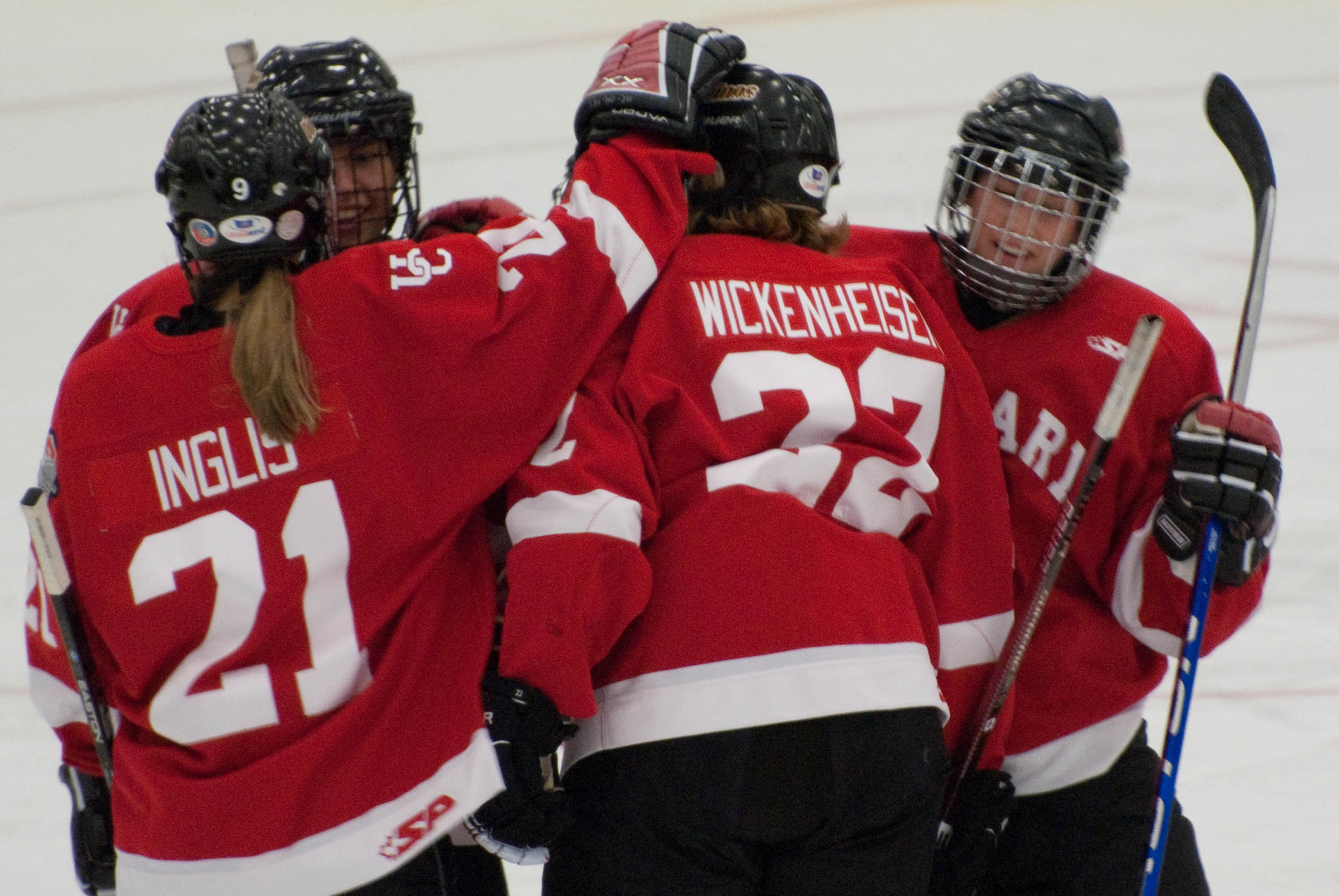
Hayley Wickenheiser celebrates her first CIS goal with her University of Calgary teammates

Former two-time Olympic gold medalist and eight-time world champion Danielle Goyette was named head coach of the team in May 2007 and continued in that role through to the cancelled 2020–21 season, being named the Canada West Coach of the Year for 2019–2020. Carla MacLeod was named head coach ahead of the 2021-22 season.

On September 16, 2010, Hayley Wickenheiser announced that she would return to the University of Calgary to complete her Kinesiology degree. She also announced that she would join the Dinos women's hockey team. On October 8, 2011, Hayley Wickenheiser played in her first CIS game with the Dinos. She earned first star honours and had two goals and one assist. By season's end, Wickenheiser appeared in only 15 of 24 games due to injury and commitments with Team Canada. She tied for the conference scoring lead with 40 points and led Canada West with 17 goals on the season. Her 2.67 points-per-game average led CIS hockey. She recorded four short-handed goals on the year along with five game-winners and finished with a +22 rating. She led Canada West in all of these categories, respectively. She is the first Dino in program history to be named the Canada West MVP and the first conference all-star since the 2000 season. On March 9, 2011: As a first-year forward for the University of Calgary, Hayley Wickenheiser was named the Canadian Interuniversity Sport player of the year in women's hockey. She then became the first ever Dino to win the Brodrick Trophy as CIS MVP.

On February 25, 2012, Iya Gavrilova scored the game-winning goal in the deciding game of the 2012 Canada West tournament, as the Calgary Dinos claimed their first ever tournament title.

== Season–by–season results ==
In the 1997–99 seasons, there was no regular season. Teams competed in tournaments and the champion was determined by a Canada West Tournament.

Except between 2000-2009 when the Dinos participated in the Alberta Colleges Athletic Conference (ACAC), they have primarily participated in the Canada West conference.

National Tournament champions	Conference champions

Conference	Season Totals										Conference Tournament Results	National Tournament Results
Conference	Conference					Overall					Conference Tournament Results	National Tournament Results
Conference	GP	W	L	T	Finish	GP	W	L	T	%	Conference Tournament Results	National Tournament Results
Josh Gosling 2023-Present
2025–26	28	16	12	0	3rd in CW	34	21	13	0	.605	Lost Quarterfinal Series 0–2 (Trinity Western)	Did not qualify
2024–25	28	8	20	0	7th in CW	36	10	24	0	.294	Did not qualify	Did not qualify
2023–24	28	12	16	0	5th in CW	32	13	19	0	.406	Won Quarterfinal Series 2–1 (Saskatchewan); Lost Semifinal Series 1–2 (UBC)	Did not qualify
Carla MacLeod 2021-2023
2022–23	28	15	13	0	4th in CW	36	19	13	4	.583	Lost Quarterfinal Series 0–2 (Saskatchewan)	Did not qualify
2021–22	20	7	13	0	7th in CW	27	10	17	0	.370	Did not qualify	Did not qualify
Danielle Goyette 2014-2021
2020–21	Cancelled due to COVID-19 pandemic											
2019–20	28	18	10	0	2nd in CW	33	21	12	0	.636	Lost in Semifinal series 1–2 (Mount Royal)	Cancelled due to COVID-19 pandemic
2018–19	28	5	23	0	8th in CW	31	5	29	0	.147	Did not qualify	Did not qualify
2017–18	28	8	20	0	7th in CW	34	12	22	0	.353	Did not qualify	Did not qualify
2016–17	28	5	23	0	7th in CW	32	8	23	1	.266	Did not qualify	Did not qualify
2015–16	28	12	16	0	6th in CW	30	13	17	0	.433	Lost Quarterfinal Series 0–2 (Regina)	Lost in quarterfinal 0–4 (Montreal)
2014–15	24	14	10	0	4th in CW	23	17	16	0	.515	Won Quarterfinal Series 2–0 (McGill); Lost Semifinal Series 0–2 (Alberta)	Lost in Quarterfinals 2–8 (McGill)
Kelly Bechard 2013-2014
2013–14	28	12	15	0	6th in CW	30	13	16	0	.448	Lost in Quarterfinal Series 0–2 (UBC)	Did not qualify
Danielle Goyette 2007-2013
2012–13	28	23	5	0	1st	36	29	7	0	.806	Won Semifinal Series 2–1 (Alberta); Lost Championship Series 1–2	Won Quarterfinal 4–0 (St. FX); Won Semifinal 5–4 (OT); Lost Championship 2–3 (Montréal)
2011–12	24	20	4	0	1st in CW	30	26	4	0	.867	Won Semifinal Series 2–0 (Lethbridge); Won Championship Series 2–0 (Alberta)	Won Quarterfinal 1–0 (McGill); Won Semifinal 4–2 (Alberta); Won Championship 5–1 (Montréal)
2010–11	24	16	6	0	3rd in CW	27	18	9	0	.667	Did not qualify	Did not qualify
2009–10	24	7	17	0	6th in CW	30	12	18	0	.400	Did not qualify	Did not qualify
2008–09	22	17	5	0	2nd in ACAC	30	22	8	0	.733	Won Semifinal Series 2–0 (MacEwan) Won Championship Series 3–2 (Mount Royal)	Did not qualify
2007–08	22	12	10	0	3rd in ACAC	28	15	13	0	.536	Won Quarterfinal Series 2–0 (NAIT); Won Semifinal Series 2–1 (SAIT); Lost Final Series 1–3 (Macewan)	Did not qualify
Dean Holden 2005-2007
2006–07	22	7	14	1	5th in ACAC	28	8	18	2	.321	Lost Semifinal Series 1–2 (Mount Royal)	Did not qualify
2005–06	20	2	18	0	6th in ACAC	20	2	18	0	.136	Lost Quarterfinal Series 0–2 (SAIT)	Did not qualify
Julie Healy 2003-2005
2004–05	20	3	16	1	6th in ACAC	20	3	16	1	.175	Did not qualify	Did not qualify
2003–04	20	7	10	3	4th in ACAC	20	7	10	3	.425	Won Semifinal Series 2–1 (Grant MacEwan); Lost in Final Series 1–3 (Mount Royal)	Did not qualify
Kevin Brost 2002-2003
2002–03	20	4	8	7	4th in ACAC	23	5	10	7	.386	Lost Semifinal Series 1–2 (Grant MacEwan)	Did not qualify
Kathy Berg 2000-2002
2001–02	11	1	9	1	6th in CW	11	1	9	1	.136	Did not qualify	Did not qualify
2000–01	16	1	14	1	7th in CW	16	1	14	1	.094	Did not qualify	Lost in quarterfinals 1–12 (Toronto)
Julie Healy 1997-2000
1999–00	12	9	3	0		12	9	3	0	.750	Won semifinal 3–2 (Regina); Lost final 2–3 (Alberta)	Did not qualify
1998–99	6	4	1	1	1st in CW	6	4	1	1	.688	Won semifinal 4–0 (UBC); Lost Championship 2–3 (Alberta)	Did not qualify
1997–98	—	—	—	—	—	4	3	1	0	.750	Won quarterfinal #1 10–0 (Lethbridge); Won quarterfinal #2 3–1 (Saskatchewan); Lost semifinal 0–1 (Alberta)	Did not qualify

Note: OTL have been included as ties

== Coaches ==
=== Current coaching staff ===
Name	Position	First Season
Josh Gosling	Head Coach	2023–24
Mackenzie Ebel	Assistant Coach	2025–26
Rick Deschamps	Assistant Coach	2024–25

=== All-time coaching records ===
Tenure	Coach	Seasons	Record	Pct
2023–Present	Josh Gosling	3	44–56–0	.440
2021–23	Carla MacLeod	2	29–30–4	.492
2014–21	Danielle Goyette	7	76–119–1	.390
2013–14	Kelly Bechard	1	13–16–0	.448
2007–13	Danielle Goyette	6	122–59–0	.674
2005–07	Dean Holden	2	10–36–2	.229
2003–05	Julie Healy	2	10–26–4	.300
2002–03	Kevin Brost	1	5–10–7	.386
2000–02	Kathy Berg	2	2–23–2	.111
1997–2000	Julie Healy	3	16–5–1	.750

== Current roster ==
Current to the 2025–26 season

No.	Nat.	Player	Class	Pos	Height	Weight	DoB	Hometown	Previous team	NHL rights
2	(Canada)	Mackenzie Galick	Freshman	D	5' 2" (1.57 m)	2007-01-02	Langley, BC	Delta Hockey Academy (CSSHL)
4	(Canada)	Makenna Schafer	Sophomore	F	5' 8" (1.73 m)	2006-03-20	Calgary, AB	Calgary Fire (AFHL)
5	(Canada)	Emma Tait (A)	Graduate	D	5' 8" (1.73 m)		Delta, BC	Fraser Valley Rush (BCEHL)
6	(Canada)	Madelynne Nafziger	Sophomore	D	5' 4" (1.63 m)	2006-06-15	Caroline, AB	Calgary Fire (AFHL)
7	(Canada)	Brooklyn Anderson (C)	Graduate	F	5' 2" (1.57 m)	2002-02-03	Shellbrooke, SK	Trinity Western University (U Sports)
8	(Canada)	Evelyn Lawrence	Junior	F	5' 2" (1.57 m)	2005-12-04	Calgary, AB	Calgary Fire (AFHL)
9	(Canada)	Solana Cooper	Junior	F	5' 8" (1.73 m)	2005-09-23	North Vancouver, BC	Fraser Valley Rush (BCEHL)
10	(Canada)	Jessica Martens (A)	Graduate	F	5' 3" (1.6 m)	2001-11-27	Rocky View County, AB	Hockey Training Institute Stars
11	(Canada)	Eden Carius	Sophomore	F	5' 6" (1.68 m)	2006-06-27	Brentwood Bay, BC	Notre Dame Hounds (SFMHL AAA)
12	(Canada)	Bree Kennedy	Senior	F	5' 1" (1.55 m)	2002-01-07	Chestermere, AB	University of Alberta (U Sports)
13	(Canada)	Brooklyn Fry	Junior	D	5' 11" (1.8 m)	2005-02-13	Shell Lake, SK	Saskatoon Stars (SFMHL AAA)
14	(Canada)	April Klarenbach	Sophomore	F	5' 5" (1.65 m)	2006-10-19	Cochrane, AB	Edge School (CSSHL)
16	(Canada)	Brette Kerley	Graduate	F	5' 6" (1.68 m)	2003-04-30	Williams Lake, BC	Northern Capitals (BCF AAA)
18	(Canada)	Hannah Reagh	Sophomore	F	5' 4" (1.63 m)	2006-02-18	Binscarth, MB	Yellowhead Chiefs (MFHL)
19	(Canada)	Caitlyn Perlinger	Junior	D	5' 4" (1.63 m)	2005-01-28	Kindersley, SK	Swift Current Wildcats (SFMHL AAA)
20	(Canada)	Jaecia Joyce	Sophomore	D	5' 3" (1.6 m)	2005-05-02	Sundre, AB	Red Deer Chiefs (AFHL)
21	(Canada)	Josie McLeod (A)	Graduate	D	5' 9" (1.75 m)	2002-02-25	Okotoks, AB	Union College (NCAA)
23	(Canada)	Sydney Mercier	Senior	F	5' 6" (1.68 m)	2003-09-24	Saskatoon, SK	Saskatoon Stars (SFMHL AAA)
24	(Canada)	Jada Johns	Sophomore	D	5' 8" (1.73 m)	2005-01-24	White City, SK	Regina Rebels (SFMHL AAA)
25	(Canada)	Kyla Mitenko	Junior	D	5' 4" (1.63 m)	2005-09-29	Calgary, AB	Edge School (CSSHL)
26	(Canada)	Alex Spence	Graduate	D	5' 3" (1.6 m)	2002-04-22	Lloydminster, AB	Mount Royal University (U Sports)
27	(Canada)	Sophia Zuck	Senior	F	5' 6" (1.68 m)	2004-06-03	Prince Albert, SK	Prince Albert Bears (SFMHL AAA)
28	(Canada)	Bridget Rezansoff	Sophomore	D	5' 8" (1.73 m)	2003-03-16	Saskatoon, SK	Saskatoon Stars (SFMHL AAA)
29	(Canada)	Amelia Awad	Senior	G	5' 7" (1.7 m)	2003-10-29	Halifax, NS	Station Six Fire (U18 AAA)
30	(Canada)	Maisie Cope	Freshman	G	5' 6" (1.68 m)	2003-10-29	Victoria, BC	Delta Hockey Academy (U18 AAA)
39	(Canada)	Alyssa Barrette	Freshman	G	5' 6" (1.68 m)	2007-10-09	Calgary, AB	Calgary Northwest Bruins (AEHL)

== Awards and honours ==
- Kelsey Roberts, Canada West Female Second Star Athlete of the Week (Week 14: Jan.7, 2020)
- Iya Gavrilova, 2015 Brodrick Trophy winner
- Hayley Wickenheiser, First Star of Game (October 8, 2010)
- Elizabeth Lang, Fastest Hat-Trick in CW History (Time 5:55) (November 27, 2022)

=== USports Awards ===
- Amanda Tapp, 2012 CIS Championship MVP
- Hayley Wickenheiser, 2011 Brodrick Trophy (CIS MVP)
- Sydney Mercier, 2023 U SPORTS Rookie of the Year

==== All-Canadians ====
- Elizabeth Lang, 2023-2024 All-Canadian Second Team All
- Kelsey Roberts, 2019-2020 All-Canadian First Team All Star
- Alexandra Vafina, 2015-2016 All-Canadian First Team All-Star
- Iya Gavrilova, 2015-2016 All-Canadian First Team All-Star
- Iya Gavrilova, 2014-15 All-Canadian First Team All-Star
- Stephanie Ramsay, 2012-13 USports First Team All-Star
- Hayley Wickenheiser, 2012-2013 All-Canadian First Team All-Star
- Hayley Wickenheiser, 2011-2012 All-Canadian Second Team All-Star
- Carol Scheibel, 1999-2000 All-Canadian Second Team All-Star
- Colleen Sostorics, 1998-1999 All-Canadian Second Team All-Star
- Kelly Bechard, 1997-1998 All-Canadian First Team All-Star
- Colleen Sostorics, 1997-1998 All-Canadian Second Team All-Star

=== Canada West Awards ===
- Jenna Smith, 2011 Canada West Rookie of the Year
- Danielle Goyette, 2019-2020 Canada West Conference Coach of the Year
- Hayley Wickenheiser was named the Canada West female athlete of the week on November 2, 2010 after scoring three goals and adding an assist in two games against the University of Alberta.
- Sydney Mercier, 2023 Canada West Rookie of the Year
- Amelia Awad, 2025-26 Canada West Goaltender of the Year

==== Hall of Fame ====
- Hayley Wickenheiser: Canada West Hall of Fame - 2021 Inductee

==== Player of the Year ====
- Sydney Mercier, 2023 USPORTS Rookie of the Year
- Kelsey Roberts, 2019-2020 Canada West Conference Women's Hockey Player of the Year
- Iya Gavrilova, 2015 Canada West Conference Player of the Year
- Hayley Wickenheiser, 2011 Canada West Player of the Year

==== Canada West All-Rookie ====
- April Klarenbach, Forward, 2024–25 Canada West All-Rookie Team

==== Canada West All-Stars ====
Year	Player	Position	Team
2011	Hayley Wickenheiser	Forward	First
2011	Melissa Zubick	Defense	First
2011	Amanda Tapp	Goaltender	First

- 2012 Canada West First Team All-Star: Iya Gavrilova, Forward
- 2012 Canada West First Team All-Star: Stephanie Ramsay, Forward
- 2012 Canada West First Team All-Star: Hayley Wickenheiser, Forward
- 2012 Canada West Second Team All-Star: Melissa Zubick, Forward
- 2015 Canada West First Team All-Star: Iya Gavrilova, Forward
- 2020 Canada West First Team All-Star: Kelsey Roberts, Goaltender
- 2020 Canada West First Team All-Star: Elizabeth Lang, Forward
- 2020 Canada West Second Team All-Star: Paige Michalenko, Defense
- 2022 Canada West Second Team All-Star: Elizabeth Lang, Forward
- 2023 Canada West First Team All-Star: Alli Borrow, Forward
- 2023 Canada West Second Team All-Star: Gabriella Durante, Goaltender
- 2023 Canada West All-Rookie Team: Keagan Goulet, Defense
- 2023 Canada West All-Rookie Team: Sydney Mercier, Forward
- 2024 Canada West All-Rookie Team: Brooklin Fry, Defense
- 2024 Canada West All-Rookie Team: Kyla Mitenko, Forward
- 2024 Canada West Second Team All-Star: Courtney Kollman, Forward
- 2024 Canada West First Team All-Star: Elizabeth Lang, Forward
- 2026 Canada West First Team All-Star: Amelia Awad, Goaltender
- 2026 Canada West Second Team All-Star: Brooklyn Anderson, Forward

=== University Awards ===
- 2019-20 University of Calgary Athlete of the Year: Kelsey Roberts

== Dinos in pro hockey ==
= CWHL All-Star	= NWHL All-Star	= Clarkson Cup Champion	= Isobel Cup Champion

Player	Position	Team	Years	League	Titles
Iya Gavrilova	Forward	Calgary Inferno	CWHL		2016 Clarkson Cup
Hayley Wickenheiser	Forward	Calgary Inferno	CWHL		2016 Clarkson Cup

=== International ===
- Alexandra Vafina Russia: 2015 Winter Universiade (gold) , 2017 Winter Universiade (gold)
- Sydney Mercier, Forward, Canada: Ice hockey at the 2025 Winter World University Games (silver)
- Gabriella Durante, Italy Goaltender: Ice hockey at the 2026 Winter Olympics – Women's tournament.
