= 2012 CIS Women's Ice Hockey Championship =

- Season: 2011–12
- Teams: Six
- Format: Round-robin
- Finals site: Clare Drake Arena; Edmonton, Alberta
- Champions: Calgary Dinos (1 title)
- Runner-up: Montréal Carabins
- Winning coach: Danielle Goyette (1 title)
- Tournament MVP: Amanda Tapp (Calgary Dinos)

The 2012 CIS Women's Ice Hockey Championship was held March 8 to March 11, 2012, in Edmonton, Alberta, to determine a national champion for the 2011–12 women's ice hockey season. The tournament was played at Clare Drake Arena and was hosted by the University of Alberta for the first time in school history.

The third-seeded Calgary Dinos won the first gold medal in program history by defeating the sixth-seeded Montréal Carabins by a score of 5–1 in the gold medal game.

== Seedings ==
Six CIS teams qualified for the tournament and were divided into two pools to play a round-robin tournament to determine the two teams who would play in the championship game. The winner of Pool A played the winner of Pool B in the gold medal game.

=== Pool A ===
Seed	Team	Qualified	Record
1	Wilfrid Laurier Golden Hawks	OUA Champions	25–0–1
4	UPEI Panthers	AUS Champions	13–10–1
6	Montréal Carabins	RSEQ Finalists	13–5–2

=== Pool B ===
Seed	Team	Qualified	Record
2	McGill Martlets	RSEQ Champions	18–1–1
3	Calgary Dinos	Canada West Champions	20–4–0
5	Alberta Pandas	Canada West Finalists (Host)	14–3–7

== Game summaries ==
Date	Time	Teams	Score	Notes
March 8	15:30 MST	Pool A #1: No. 6 Montréal vs. No. 1 Laurier	Montréal (1–0) wins 6–5	2 goals score by Kim Deschênes
March 8	19:00 MST	Pool B #1: No. 3 Calgary vs. No. 2 McGill	Calgary (1–0) wins 1–0	The goal score by Sinead Tracey
March 9	15:30 MST	Pool A #2: No. 1 Laurier vs. No. 4 UPEI	Laurier (1–1) wins 3–0	
March 9	19:00 MST	Pool B #2: No. 2 McGill vs. No. 5 Alberta	McGill (1–1) wins 4–0	Leslie Oles score two goals
March 10	15:30 MST	Pool A #3: No. 6 Montreal vs. No. 4 UPEI	Montreal (2–0) wins 4–1	
March 10	19:00 MST	Pool B #3: No. 3 Calgary vs. No. 5 Alberta	Calgary (2–0) wins 4–2	

=== CIS Medal round ===
==== 5th-place game ====
March 11, 2012; 11:00 am	Alberta Pandas	Alberta, 1–0; 3	UPEI Panthers	Clare Drake Arena, Edmonton, Alberta; Attendance: 434

Game reference
Kanesa Shewtz	Goalies	Kristy Dobson	Referees: Ashley Desjardin; Amanda Verishine, Shauna Wing
Katie Stewart / Goals			Referees: Ashley Desjardin; Amanda Verishine, Shauna Wing
29	Shots	19	Referees: Ashley Desjardin; Amanda Verishine, Shauna Wing

==== Bronze-medal game ====
March 11, 2012; 14:00 pm	McGill Martlets	McGill, 4–0; 3	Wilfrid Laurier Golden Hawks	Clare Drake Arena, Edmonton, Alberta; Attendance: 384

Game reference
Michelle Daigneault, Leslie Oles, Ann-Sophie Bettez, Melodie Daoust / Goals

==== Gold-medal game ====
March 11, 2012; 18:00 pm	Calgary Dinos	Calgary, 5–1; 3	Montréal Carabins	Clare Drake Arena, Edmonton, Alberta; Attendance: 768

Game reference
Amanda Tapp	Goalies	Rachel Ouellette	Referees: Gabrielle Ariano-Lortie; Amanda Allaire, Danielle McGurry
Hayley Wickenheiser (2), Jenna Smith, Iya Gavrilova, Elana Lovell / Goals / Elizabeth Mantha			Referees: Gabrielle Ariano-Lortie; Amanda Allaire, Danielle McGurry
28	Shots	24	Referees: Gabrielle Ariano-Lortie; Amanda Allaire, Danielle McGurry

== Final results ==
(gold) Gold	(silver) Silver	(bronze) Bronze	4th Place	5th Place	6th Place
Calgary Dinos	Montréal Carabins	McGill Martlets	Wilfrid Laurier Golden Hawks	Alberta Pandas	UPEI Panthers

== Awards and honours ==
=== All-Tournament Team ===
Goaltender: Amanda Tapp, Calgary Dinos
Defence: Stephanie Ramsay, Calgary Dinos
Defence: Élizabeth Mantha, Montréal Carabins
Forward: Kim Deschênes, Montréal Carabins
Forward: Leslie Oles, McGill Matlets
Forward: Hayley Wickenheiser, Calgary Dinos

=== Other ===
Tournament MVP: Amanda Tapp, Calgary Dinos
R.W. Pugh Fair-Play Award: Andrea Boras, Alberta Pandas

==== Player of the game awards ====
5th-place game: Sarah Hilworth, Alberta; Laura Bradley, PEI
Bronze medal game: Michelle Daigneault, McGill; Laura Brooker, Wilfrid Laurier
Gold medal game: Elizabeth Mantha, Montreal; Hayley Wickenheiser, Calgary
