= 2011 in women's ice hockey =

The following are the women's ice hockey events of the year 2011 throughout the world.

== Championships ==
- 2011 Clarkson Cup: Montreal Stars
- 2011 IIHF World Women's U18 Championship: United States
- 2011 IIHF World Women's U18 Championship – Division I: Russia
- 2011 IIHF Women's World Championship: United States
- 2011 MLP Nations Cup: Canada
- 2011 NCAA Women's Frozen Four: Wisconsin Badgers
- 2011 Women's World Ice Hockey Championships – Division I: Germany
- 2011 Women's World Ice Hockey Championships – Division II: Czech Republic
- 2011 Women's World Ice Hockey Championships – Division III: Netherlands
- 2011 Women's World Ice Hockey Championships – Division IV: New Zealand
- 2011 Women's World Ice Hockey Championships – Division V: Poland
- 2011 Winter Universiade: Canada

== Events ==
=== January–March ===
- January 3, 7–8: In three games played, Rachel Weber of the Princeton Tigers earned three victories and allowed only one goal. On January 3, she defeated Quinnipiac by a 3–0 tally and shutout Clarkson by a 2–0 score on January 7. The following day, she gave up her only goal of the week in a 3–1 win over St. Lawrence. Her shutout streak spanned six games and lasted 289:43. She is now the owner of the longest shutout streak in ECAC history and the fourth longest in NCAA Division I since the 2000–01 season.
- January 7–8: Cornell Big Red freshman goaltender Lauren Slebodnik earned two shutouts in her first two career starts. On January 7, she made her NCAA debut by shutting out Yale by a 5–0 margin. With Cornell dressing just 12 skaters, she stopped all 23 Yale shots. The following night, Slebodnik shut out the Brown Bears by a 3–0 mark. Cornell only dressed 11 skaters for the game and she stopped all 15 shots.
- January 8: Canada lost the gold medal match of the 2011 IIHF World Women's U18 Championship to the United States by a 5–2 score.
- January 9: Canada beat Sweden by a 6–0 mark to claim the 2011 MLP Nations Cup.
- January 15: Mercyhurst Lakers forward Bailey Bram registered two goals and four assists for a career-high six points as Mercyhurst defeated Brown 12–0. Mercyhurst notched 12 goals in a game for the first time since the 1999–2000 season.
- January 16: Brampton Thunder forward Gillian Apps scored her seventh goal of the season 2:42 into overtime as Brampton defeated the Boston Blades by a 4–3 tally. The win was the fifth in a row for Brampton who are now 11–6 on the season. At the time, the five game win streak was the best in the league. Brampton had yet to lose a game in 2011. In addition, they outscored their opponents 23–9 during the streak.
- On January 16, the Boston University Terriers defeated Maine and set a program record with their 11th home win of the season. The previous mark was 10 wins during the 2006–07 season.
- January 18, 2011: The Brampton Thunder competed against the Montreal Stars at the Invista Centre in Kingston, Ontario. This is team captain Jayna Hefford's hometown and she scored a goal in front of her closest friends, family and fans. In addition, her number 15 was raised to the rafters of the Invista Centre on behalf of the Kingston Area Minor Hockey Association. As of 2012, no sweaters bearing Hefford's number will be used in Kingston Minor Hockey.

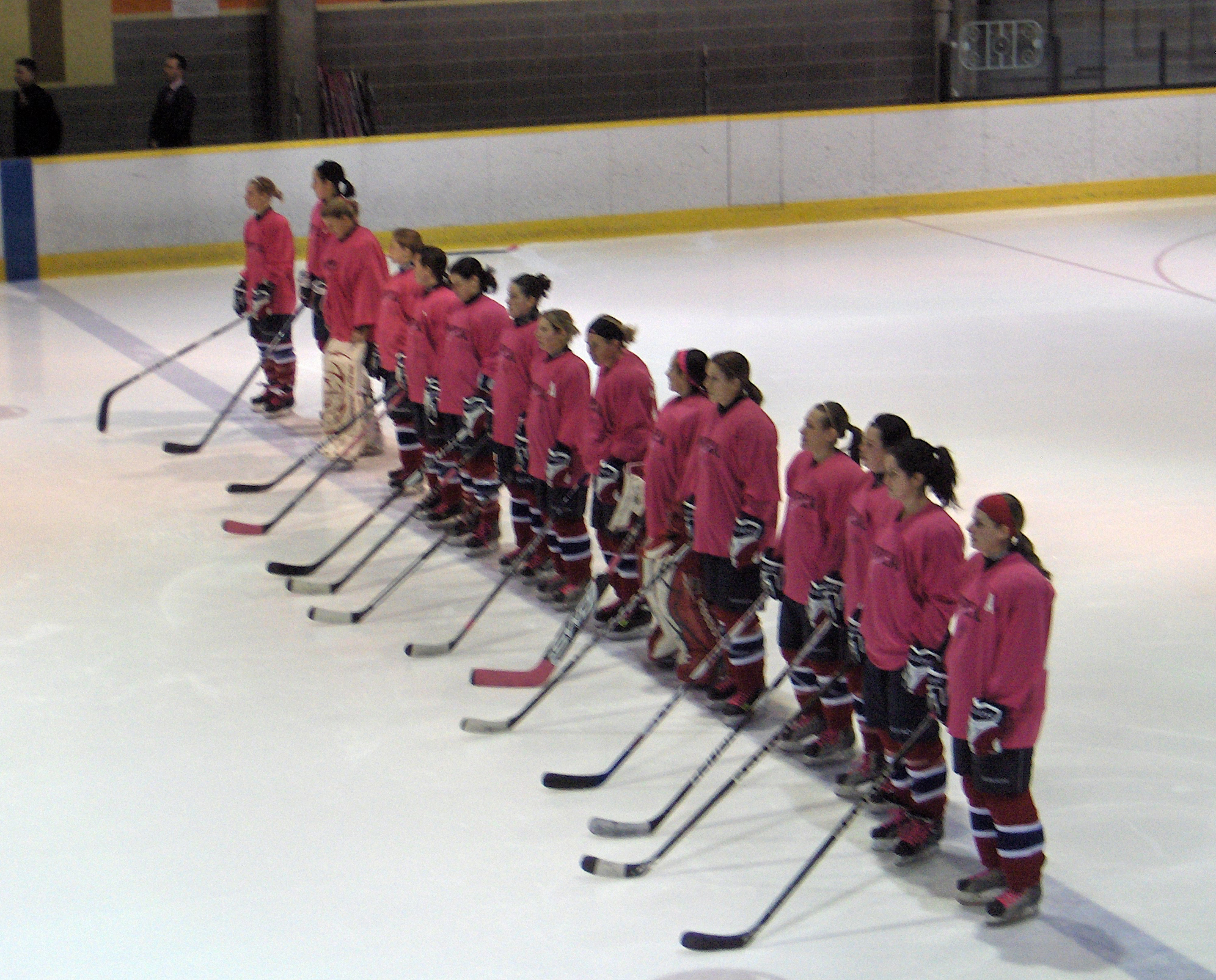
Montreal Stars played to beat breast cancer

- January 21:Georgetown, Ontario hosted a game between the Brampton Thunder and the Toronto CWHL franchise. The game featured eight former Olympians (from Brampton, Gillian Apps, Jayna Hefford, Lori Depuis, Delaney Collins and Molly Engstrom, and from Toronto, Sami Jo Small, Tessa Bonhomme and Jennifer Botterill). Brampton prevailed by a 5–2 tally.
- On January 22, 2011, Marie-Philip Poulin recorded a hat trick, including two power play goals as BU prevailed over Vermont in a 4–0 win. The win was the Terriers 100th win in program history. Poulin broke BU's single-season points record with her second goal of the game and later tied the single-season goals record with her third marker.
- January 21–22: Meghan Agosta recorded five points on two goals and three assists in a two-game sweep of Robert Morris. With the five-point effort, Agosta is now just seven points away from breaking former Harvard player Julie Chu's mark of 285 points to become the NCAA all-time points leader.
- January 21–22: Wisconsin right winter Meghan Duggan led the top-ranked Badgers with four scoring points in a win and tie at defending national champion Minnesota Duluth. Duggan registered two goals and two assists against the Bulldogs, recorded nine shots on goal and finished with a +4 plus/minus rating in the two games. She led all players with three points in the January 21 win (4–1). She scored the Badgers first goal of the game (it was the first women's college hockey goal scored at the Bulldogs new AMSOIL Arena). In the second period, she assisted on a power-play tally to give Wisconsin a 3–0 lead. In the final two minutes, she had an empty net goal. The following day, both clubs skated to a 4–4 tie (Wisconsin prevailed 2–1 in the shootout). Duggan assisted on the Badgers' second goal of the game and extended her current point streak to 22 games, the longest individual point streak in Wisconsin women's hockey history. On January 21, she broke the previous mark of 20 games set by Meghan Hunter from October 14, 2000, to January 12, 2001.
- The January 29, 2011 game between Wisconsin and Minnesota was played before a women's college hockey record crowd of 10,668.
- January 29: The Montreal Stars raised awareness and funds for the Fondation du cancer du sein du Québec (FCSQ). The game featured the Montreal club in pink at Centre Etienne Desmarteau versus the Boston Blades. Montreal prevailed by a 3–0 score (goals scored by: Stephanie Denino, Sarah Vaillancourt and Tawnya Davis). 800 persons came to support the cause.
- On February 4, 2011, Meghan Agosta became the all-time leading scorer in NCAA women's hockey history with three goals and one assist in Mercyhurst College's 6–2 win over Wayne State in Erie, Pennsylvania. Agosta's four points gave her 286 career points, one more than ex-Harvard forward Julie Chiu's record of 285 set in 2006–07. Agosta, who also owns the record for most short-handed goals and game-winning goals, added three assists in the Lakers' 3–1 win over Wayne State on February 5.
- February 5: Hilary Knight scored her 36th goal of the year at 2:46 in the overtime period as Wisconsin defeated the Bemidji State Beavers by a 3–2 mark at the Sanford Center. Bemidji State goalie Alana McElhinney made 43 saves on the night including 24 in the second period.
- February 5: Canada defeated Finland by a 4–1 mark to claim the gold medal at the 2011 Winter Universiade. Slovakia defeated the United States to claim the bronze medal.
- February 12: The Brampton Thunder bested the Boston for a tenth straight victory.
- February 12: In front of 3,783 fans at the Kohl Center, ten Badgers recorded points as the Badgers defeated North Dakota by an 8–4 mark. The game marked the final regular season game for seniors Mallory Deluce, Anne Dronen, Meghan Duggan, Kelly Nash, Carla Pentimone and Geena Prough.
- February 13: The Providence Friars earned a 4–3 victory over the Connecticut Huskies. The match was part of Whaler's Hockey Fest, and was played outdoors at Rentschler Field.
- February 19: At the MasterCard Centre, Toronto CWHL faced off against Montreal Stars for a special event for the Canadian National Institute for the Blind. There were over 500 people in attendance and many fun events for all those involved.
- February 25, 2011: Meghan Agosta scored her 151st career goal to become all-time leading goal scorer in NCAA history. She accomplished this in a 6–2 victory over the Robert Morris Colonials women's ice hockey program at the Mercyhurst Ice Center. She surpassed Harvard's Nicole Corriero, who set the record at 150 during the 2004–05 season. The goal was scored on the power play at 15:18 of the second period with the assist going to Bailey Bram. She later added her 152nd goal in the third period.
- February 26: At the 2011 Canada Winter Games, Alberta defeated Ontarion in the gold medal game by a 3–2 mark.
- February 27: In the last match of the CWHL regular season, Montreal Stars ended up on the winning side, defeating Boston Blades 4–1 solidifying their hold on first place in the Canadian Women's Hockey Leagueleague.
- March 5, 2011: In the CHA championship game, Meghan Agosta scored three goals to top 300 points for her career. The Lakers defeated Syracuse 5–4 and captured its ninth straight College Hockey America title.
- March 9: Hayley Wickenheiser became the first Calgary Dinos player to be named the CIS Brodrick Trophy Award winner (recognizing the CIS Player of the Year). Alex Normore from the St. Francis Xavier X-Women was named Rookie of the Year. Mount Allison player Andie Switalski won the Marion Hillard Award. Switalski became the first player from Mount Allison to win a major CIS award in women's ice hockey.
- March 12: The Montreal Stars defeated the Brampton Thunder by a 4–3 tally to qualify for the 2011 Clarkson Cup.
- March 13: The McGill Martlets defeated the St. Francis Xavier X-Women to claim the 2011 CIS National Championship.
- March 14: Three time Canadian Olympic gold medallist Jennifer Botterill announced her retirement from the Canadian National women's team.
- March 20: The Wisconsin Badgers bested the Boston University Terriers by a 4–1 mark to claim the 2011 NCAA Frozen Four. Wisconsin finished the championship season on a 27-game unbeaten streak, posting a 25–0–2 record since losing to WCHA rival Minnesota Duluth on November 28, 2010. The Frozen Four match marked the first meeting between Wisconsin and Boston University in women's hockey history. The match marked the Badgers 37th win of the season. It set a record for the most wins in a single season in NCAA women's hockey history. The previous mark of 36 wins was set by three teams: Minnesota (36–2–2) in 2005; Wisconsin (36–4–1) in 2006; Wisconsin (36–1–4) in 2007.
- March 27: The Montreal Stars defeated Toronto CWHL by a 5–0 tally to claim its second Clarkson Cup championship.

=== April–June ===
- April 3: Host country Russia defeated France by a 10–0 score to win the 2011 IIHF World Women's U18 Championship – Division I.
- April 17: Germany defeated Norway by a 3–1 mark to claim the 2011 Women's World Ice Hockey Championships – Division I. Germany will be promoted to the Top Division for the 2012 championships.
- April 19: The Canadian Women's Hockey League announced an expansion franchise in Calgary, Alberta. The team will be made up of players from various teams in the former Western Women's Hockey League. The expansion team will share their home games by playing in various arenas across the province of Alberta. Strathmore Rockies founder Samantha Holmes-Domagala, will join the sponsorship division of the CWHL and look after the requirements of the expansion team.
- April 23: The Notre Dame Hounds of Manitoba, Canada have emerged victorious at the 2011 Esso Cup, Canada's National Female Midget Championship. The Hounds bested the Edmonton Thunder 5–2 in the gold medal game at the Performance Arena in Servus Place. In the bronze medal game, the Toronto Aeros blanked the Lac St-Louis Kodiaks from Quebec 4–0, to claim the bronze medal.
- April 25: Hilary Knight scored the game-winning goal as the United States defeated Canada in a 3–2 overtime in the gold-medal game at the IIHF World Women's Championships.
- May 18: Ottawa was named as the host city for the 2013 IIHF World Women's Championship. The city last hosted the IIHF World Women's Championship in 1990, which was the inaugural event.

=== July–September ===
- September 13 Buffalo native Lexi Peters became the first female ice hockey player to appear in an EA Sports NHL Hockey video game. Her appearance will be in EA Sports NHL 12 video game (released on September 13, 2011).

=== October–December ===
- October 2 The first-ever World Girls' Hockey Day was held in various events around the world. The initiative was spearheaded by the International Ice Hockey Federation as part of its efforts to help grow the women's game.
- October 25: In a 6–2 triumph over the Colgate Raiders, freshman Jillian Saulnier scored four goals in her NCAA debut. It was the first four-goal game for Cornell since Jessica Campbell scored four against Robert Morris in the second game of the 2010–11 season. The Big Red held a 64–12 advantage in shots on goal while also winning faceoffs by a margin of 53–27. The 64 shots were the most the Big Red took since a February 6, 2000 contest against Union.
- October 28–29: The series versus the Mercyhurst Lakers women's ice hockey program marked the first time that the Lindenwood Lady Lions ice hockey program hosted an NCAA Division I opponent in their home arena. Mercyhurst would win the October 28 match by a 7–0 tally, in which Lakers freshman Shelby Bram would score her first career NCAA goal. The October 29 contest saw Mercyhurst emerge as the victor in a 14–0 whitewash.
- October 29: Montreal Carabins skater Ariane Barker scored with 71 seconds left to give the squad a 3–2 win versus the McGill Martlets. It marked the Martlets first loss to a Quebec conference opponent for the first time in 108 games.
- November 26: Quinnipiac Bobcats women's ice hockey player Kelly Babstock led all skaters in points at the 2011 Nutmeg Classic with four (one goal, three assists). With the two assists in the championship game, Babstock earned the 39 and 40 assists of her career, surpassing Caitlin Peters as the all-time assist leader in Bobcats history. Breann Frykas scored the game-winning goal as the Bobcats bested the Robert Morris Colonials by a 3–2 tally. The victory in the Nutmeg Classic was also the 200th career victory of head coach Rick Seeley.
- December 14: In a 9–0 defeat of the Lindenwood Lady Lions, Hillary Pattenden broke Jessie Vetter's record for career NCAA wins, by notching her 92nd career victory.

== Media ==
- Kelly Babstock was featured in Sports Illustrated's Faces in the Crowd feature in the January 17, 2011 issue (as recognition of breaking several Quinnipiac scoring records).
- Meghan Agosta was also featured in the Faces in the Crowd feature in the February 21, 2011 issue (as recognition of becoming the all-time NCAA scorer).

== Awards and honors ==
- CIS
  - Hayley Wickenheiser, 2011 Canada West Player of the Year
  - Hayley Wickenheiser, University of Calgary, Brodrick Trophy (Player of the Year)
  - Alex Normore, St. Francis Xavier, CIS Rookie of the Year
  - Andrea Switalski, Mount Allison University, Marion Hillard Award
  - Jim Denham, Brock University, CIS Coach of the Year
- IIHF
  - 2011 IIHF Women's World Championship MVP (Slovakia) Zuzana Tomčíková
- NCAA
  - Becca Ruegsegger, Wisconsin, NCAA Elite 88 Award
  - Meghan Duggan, Wisconsin, Patty Kazmaier Memorial Award
- NCAA All-America honors
  - First team

Player	Position	School
Molly Schaus	G	Boston College
Laura Fortino	D	Cornell
Jocelyne Larocque	D	Minnesota Duluth
Meghan Agosta	F	Mercyhurst
Meghan Duggan	F	Wisconsin
Hilary Knight	F	Wisconsin

  - Second team

Player	Position	School
Noora Raty	G	Minnesota
Lauriane Rougeau	D	Cornell
Catherine Ward	D	Boston University
Brianna Decker	F	Wisconsin
Rebecca Johnston	F	Cornell
Kelli Stack	F	Boston College

== Statistical leaders ==
- NCAA scoring champion: Meghan Duggan, Wisconsin Badgers
- CWHL scoring champion: Caroline Ouellette, Montreal Stars
- 2011 MLP Cup leading scorer: (Tie) (Canada) Vicki Bendus and (Canada) Bailey Bram (9 points)
- 2011 IIHF Women's World Championship leading scorer: (United States) Hilary Knight (14 points)
- 2011 IIHF World Women's U18 Championship leading scorer: (Tie) (United States) Alexandra Carpenter (10 points), (United States) Hannah Brandt (10 points), (United States) Amanda Pelkey (10 points)

== Deaths ==
- April 3: Former Yale Bulldogs women's ice hockey player Mandi Schwartz succumbed to recurrent acute myeloid leukemia at age 23.
