= 2010–11 Calgary Dinos women's ice hockey season =

2010–11 University of Calgary Dinos women's ice hockey season Calgary Dinos women's ice hockey season
- Conference: Canada West

Record

Coaches and captains
- Head coach: Danielle Goyette
- Assistant coaches: Logan Frison; Alison Goodman; Kelly Bechard
- Captain: Caitlin O'Hara
- Alternate captain(s): Casey Irving, Beccy Niehaus

The Calgary Dinos women's ice hockey team represented the University of Calgary in the 2010–11 CIS women's ice hockey season. The head coach is former Olympic gold medallist Danielle Goyette. She is assisted by another former Olympic gold medallist Kelly Bechard, Alison Goodman, and Logan Frison. For the season, the Dinos had 18 wins, 8 losses and 3 ties. Their conference record was 16–6–2.

== News and notes ==
- Sept. 16, 2010: Hayley Wickenheiser announced that she would return to the University of Calgary to complete her Kinesiology degree. She also announced that she would join the Dinos women's hockey team.
- March 16, 2011: Local philanthropist Joan Snyder donated $500,000 to the creation of the Joan Snyder Program of Excellence, the first of its kind in Canada. It will fund the Dinos through the 2015–16 season. All home games will move from the Olympic Oval to the Father David Bauer Arena.
- Wickenheiser appeared in only 15 of 24 games due to injury and commitments with Team Canada. She tied for the conference scoring lead with 40 points and led Canada West with 17 goals on the season. Her 2.67 points-per-game average led CIS hockey. She recorded four short-handed goals on the year along with five game-winners and finished with a +22 rating. She led Canada West in all of these categories, respectively. She is the first Dino in program history to be named the Canada West MVP and the first conference all-star since the 2000 season.
- March 9, 2011: As a first-year forward for the University of Calgary, Hayley Wickenheiser was named the Canadian Interuniversity Sport player of the year in women's hockey. She then became the first ever Dino to win the Brodrick Trophy as CIS MVP.

== Regular season ==
- October 8:Hayley Wickenheiser played in her first CIS game with the Dinos. She earned first star honours and had two goals and one assist.
- November 12: Manitoba player Becca King scored the game-winning goal as Manitoba beat the Dinos by a 3–2 mark.
- November 13: Amanda Tapp had 32 saves and Erika Mitschke scored the game-winning goal as the Dinos bested the Manitoba Bisons at the Olympic Oval in Calgary.

=== Schedule ===
Date	Opponent	Score	Record	Goal scorers
Sept. 26	@ Lethbridge	5-3		
Oct. 8	Regina Cougars	4-3	1-0-0	H. Wickenheiser, Nicole Kuglin, Maddison Gee
Oct. 9	Regina Cougars	1-2		
Oct. 15	Lethbridge	5-0		
Oct. 16	Lethbridge	4-3 (OT)		
Oct. 22	UBC	2-3		
Oct. 23	UBC	6-0		
Oct. 29	Alberta Pandas	2-1		
Oct. 30	Alberta Pandas	2-0		
Nov. 5	@ Saskatchewan Huskies	1-3		T. Morgan
Nov. 6	@ Saskatchewan Huskies	3-4		E. Lovell, K. Sonnenberg, E. Mitschke
Nov. 12	Manitoba Bisons	2-3		C. Peterson, S. Davidson
Nov. 13	Manitoba Bisons	2-1 (OT)		J. Smith, E. Mitschke
Nov. 26	Regina Cougars	7-0		
Nov. 27	Regina Cougars	7-3		
Jan. 7	@ Lethbridge Horns	4-1		
Jan. 14	@ British Columbia Thunderbirds	8-5		
Jan. 15	@ British Columbia Thunderbirds	9-2		
Jan. 18	@ Lethbridge Horns	2-1 (OT)		
Jan. 21	vs. Alberta Pandas	1-2 (OT)		
Jan. 22	@ Alberta Pandas	0-1		
Jan. 28	vs. Saskatchewan Huskies	3-4 (OT)		
Jan. 29	vs. Saskatchewan Huskies	2-1		
Feb. 4	vs. Manitoba	2-1 (OT)		
Feb. 5	vs. Manitoba	0-2		

== Player stats ==
= Indicates team leader

Player	Games	Goals	Assists	Points	+/-	PIM
Hayley Wickenheiser	15	17	23	40	+22	32
Elana Lovell	24	10	11	21	+5	14
Jenna Smith	20	9	7	16	+14	18
Melissa Zubick	24	2	12	14	+10	44
Erica Mitschke	24	9	4	13	+18	14
Shannon Davidson	23	2	9	11	+8	28
Tanya Morgan	24	4	6	10	+2	2
Caitlin O'Hara	21	2	8	10	+12	24
Calaine Inglis	23	5	3	8	0	10
Kira Sonnenberg	24	5	2	7	-4	12
Erin Davidson	24	3	4	7	-2	22
Casey Irving	22	1	6	7	10	38
Rebecca Niehaus	24	3	3	6	-3	4
Chelsea Patterson	22	2	4	6	+6	14
Maddison Gee	22	2	4	6	-3	2
Nicole Kuglin	24	1	2	3	-4	18

== Postseason ==
- Canada West Playoffs

Date	Opponent	Score
February 18	@ Manitoba	2-3(OT)
February 19	@ Manitoba	2-3

== Awards and honors ==
- Jenna Smith, Hockey West Rookie of the Year
- Hayley Wickenheiser, First Star of Game (October 8)
- Wickenheiser was named the Canada West female athlete of the week on November 2, 2010, after scoring three goals and adding an assist in two games against the University of Alberta.
- Hayley Wickenheiser, 2011 Canada West Player of the Year
- Hayley Wickenheiser, 2011 Brodrick Trophy

=== Canada West All-Stars ===
Player	Position	Team
Hayley Wickenheiser	Forward	First
Melissa Zubick	Defense	First
Amanda Tapp	Goaltender	First
