= WickFest =

Canadian festival

The Canadian Tire Wickenheiser World Female Hockey Festival, or WickFest is an annual festival showcasing women and girls hockey. It was started by Canadian Olympic Gold Medalist Hayley Wickenheiser.

== History ==
The first WickFest was held in 2010 in Burnaby, British Columbia, following the 2010 Winter Olympics in Vancouver, and had 47 teams participate. By 2015, the tournament had grown to 2000 players from 100 teams, both from Canada and abroad. In 2017, there were 2300 participants, including a Pee Wee team from China. Attendees of the 2018 event, held at WinSport in Calgary included the Indian women's national ice hockey team. The tenth WickFest was held in early 2019 in Surrey, British Columbia.
