= 2011–12 Canadian Interuniversity Sport women's ice hockey season =

The 2011–12 Canadian Interuniversity Sport women's ice hockey season represented a season of play in Canadian Interuniversity Sport women's ice hockey. The Calgary Dinos women's ice hockey program claimed their first CIS national title.

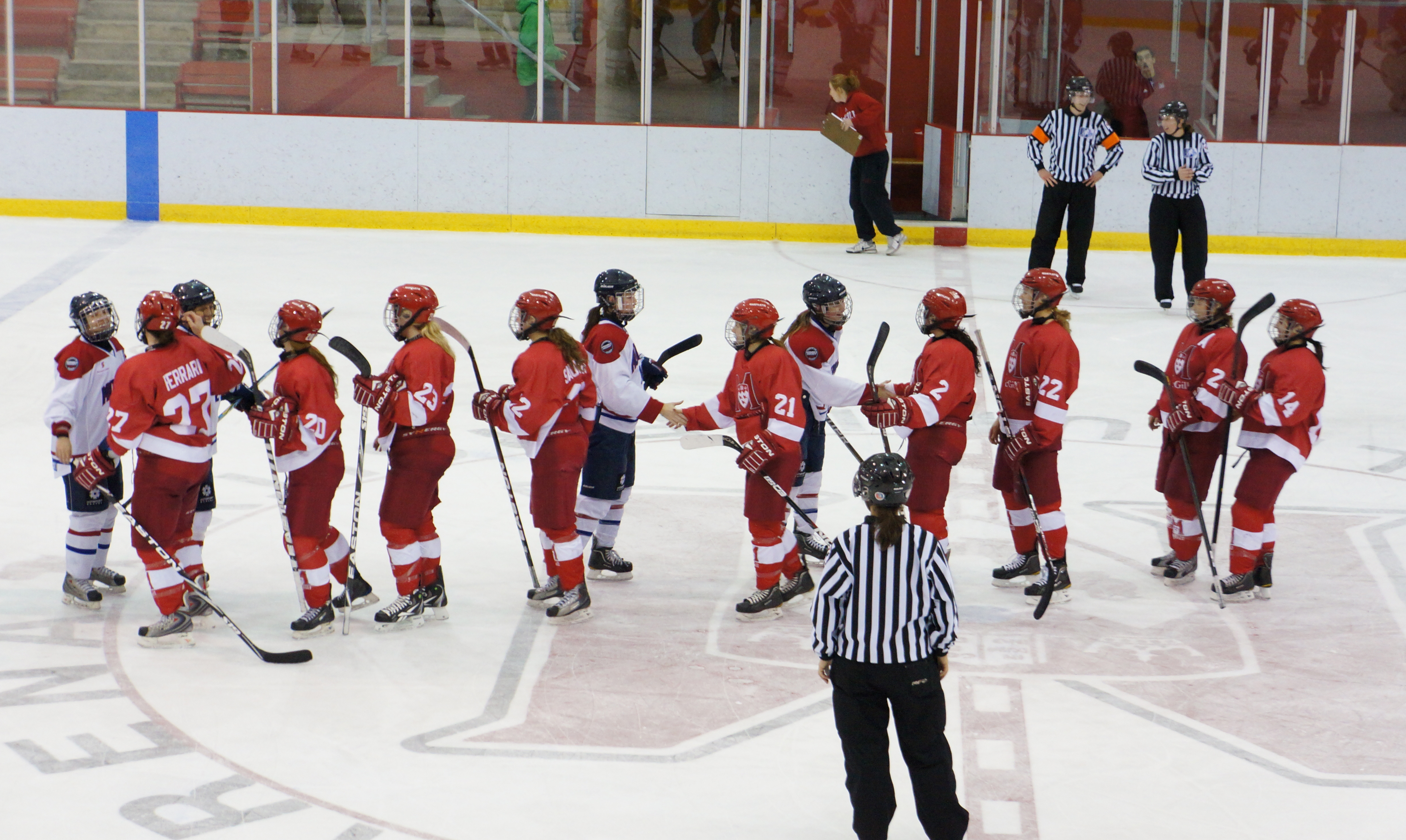
Canadian Interuniversity Sport encourages competition with a sense of fair-play

== Offseason ==
- On August 2, 2011, Jen Rawson left her assistant coaching position with the Toronto Lady Blues to assume the head coaching role for the University of British Columbia Thunderbirds. In the previous year, the Thunderbirds ranked sixth in the Canada West standings with a won loss record of 7-16-1. Rawson was tasked with helping the squad qualify for its first trip to the postseason since the 2008–09 season.

== Preseason ==
=== Carleton Ravens invitational tournament ===
Date	Teams	Rink	Score	Notes
Sept. 22	Queen's vs. Ottawa	Carleton Rink A	Queen's 4 – Ottawa 3 SO	
Sept. 22	Calgary vs. Toronto	Carleton Rink B	Calgary 3 – Toronto 1	
Sept. 22	Carleton vs. UBC	Carleton Rink A	Carleton 7 – UBC 1	
Sept. 23	Toronto vs. Carleton	Carleton Rink A	Toronto 4 – Carleton 3	
Sept. 23	Ottawa vs. UBC	Carleton Rink B	Ottawa 2 – UBC 0	
Sept. 23	Queen's vs. Calgary	Carleton Rink A	Calgary 6 – Queen's 1	
Sept. 24	UBC vs. Queen's	Carleton Rink A	Queen's 2 – UBC 0	
Sept. 24	Toronto vs. Ottawa	Carleton Rink B	Ottawa 3 – Toronto 2 SO	
Sept. 24	Calgary vs. Carleton	Carleton Rink A	Calgary 5 – Carleton 0	
Sept. 25	Calgary vs. Ottawa	Carleton Rink A	Calgary 4 – Ottawa 2	
Sept. 25	Toronto vs. UBC	Carleton Rink B	UBC 3 – Toronto 0	
Sept. 25	Carleton vs. Queen's	Carleton Rink A	Queen's 5 – Carleton 2	

== Exhibition ==
=== NCAA exhibition ===
Date	NCAA school	CIS school	Score	CIS goal scorers
Sept. 23	North Dakota	Manitoba	North Dakota, 11-0	None
Sept. 23	Ohio State	Wilfrid Laurier	Ohio State, 3-1	Katherine Shirriff
Sept. 24	North Dakokta	Manitoba	North Dakota, 10-0	None
Sat, Sep 24	Robert Morris	Waterloo	Robert Morris, 4-1	Kelly MacLean
Sept. 30	Colgate	Queen's	Colgate, 3-4	Brittany McHaffie, Kristin Smith, Taryn Pilon
Oct. 1	Vermont	McGill	McGill, 3-2	Cathy Chartrand, Jordanna Peroff, Kelsi Moffatt

== Regular season ==
=== News and notes ===
- September 27, 2011: Hayley Wickenheiser was honoured as a CIS Top Eight Academic All-Canadian. She became the first Calgary Dinos student-athlete to earn the top academic honour in CIS since soccer player Kelly Matheson in 2000.
- October 7: Leslie Oles scored twice, while adding a pair of assists as the McGill Martlets defeated Concordia by a 7-5 tally. It was the Martlets 106th consecutive victory over conference opponents. The win was also their 38th in a row over the Concordia Stingers. Head coach Peter Smith earned his 301st career win.
- October 13: During the weekend of October 14–16, all CIS hockey teams will use the RUBR brand puck. It is a Canadian-made hockey puck produced with rubber tapped naturally from the trees of Liberia.
- October 14: The Queen's Golden Gaels defeated the Chinese national women's ice hockey team by a 6-1 tally.
- October 14: Saskatchewan Huskies players Kelsey Tulloch and Danny Stone each logged a pair of goals to win their season opener versus the Regina Cougars by a 7-1 tally.
- October 16: Laura Jordan of the University of British Columbia Thunderbirds tallied two goals in a 4-2 victory over the Lethbridge Pronghorns. It was Jen Rawson's first win as the UBC head coach.
- October 29: Montreal Carabins skater Ariane Barker scored with 71 seconds left to give the squad a 3-2 win at McConnell Arena. Martlets goaltender Charline Labonte took the loss for the Martlets, giving her a 69-2 overall record in her CIS career. It marked the Martlets first loss to a Quebec conference opponent for the first time in 108 games.

=== Season standings ===
2011–12 Canada West standings
	Overall				
	GP	W	L	OL	PTS
†* Calgary Dinos	24	20	4	0	40
Alberta Pandas	24	14	3	7	35
Saskatchewan Huskies	24	16	6	2	34
Lethbridge Pronghorns	24	14	8	2	30
Manitoba Bisons	24	12	8	4	28
Regina Cougars	24	7	15	2	16
UBC Thunderbirds	24	1	21	2	4
Championship: Calgary † indicates conference regular season champion * indicates conference tournament champion

== Postseason ==
- On February 25, 2012, Iya Gavrilova scored the game-winning goal in the deciding game of the 2012 Canada West tournament, as the Calgary Dinos claimed their first ever tournament title.

== Awards and honours ==
=== OUA awards ===
- Player of the Year: Morgan McHaffie – Queen's
- Rookie of the Year: Rebecca Bouwhuis – Waterloo
- Marion Hillard Award Nominee: Jill Morillo – UOIT
- Coach of the Year: Shaun Reagan – Waterloo

=== RSEQ Awards ===
- Ann-Sophie Bettez, McGill, RSEQ Most Outstanding Player
- Melodie Daoust, McGill, RSEQ Rookie of the Year
- Kristen MacDonald, Carleton, RSEQ Leadership and Social Implication Award
- Peter Smith, McGill, RSEQ Coach of the Year

=== Canada West awards ===
- Julie Paetsch, Saskatchewan, Player of the Year
- Kelsey Tulloch, Saskatchewan, Canada West nominee, Marion Hilliard Award
- 2012 Canada West Rookie of the Year: Sadie Lenstra
- 2012 Canada West Coach of the Year: Chandy Kaip, Lethbridge

=== Atlantic University Sport ===
- Atlantic University Sport Most valuable player: Alex Normore, St. Francis Xavier
- Atlantic University Sport Rookie of the Year: Marie-Pier Arsenault, Moncton
- Atlantic University Sport Most sportsmanlike player, Ashlyn Somers, Mount Allison Mounties
- Atlantic University Sport Student-athlete community service award, Kayla Blackmore, St. Thomas
- Atlantic University Sport Coach of the Year, Bruce Donaldson, UPEI

== See also ==
- Canadian Interuniversity Sport women's ice hockey championship
- 2009–10 Canadian Interuniversity Sport women's ice hockey season
- 2006–07 Canadian Interuniversity Sport women's ice hockey season
- 2011–12 NCAA Division I women's ice hockey season
- 2012 CIS Women's Ice Hockey Championship
