= Hayley Wickenheiser =

Canadian ice hockey player (born 1978)

Hayley Wickenheiser OC OLY
- Hockey Hall of Fame, 2019
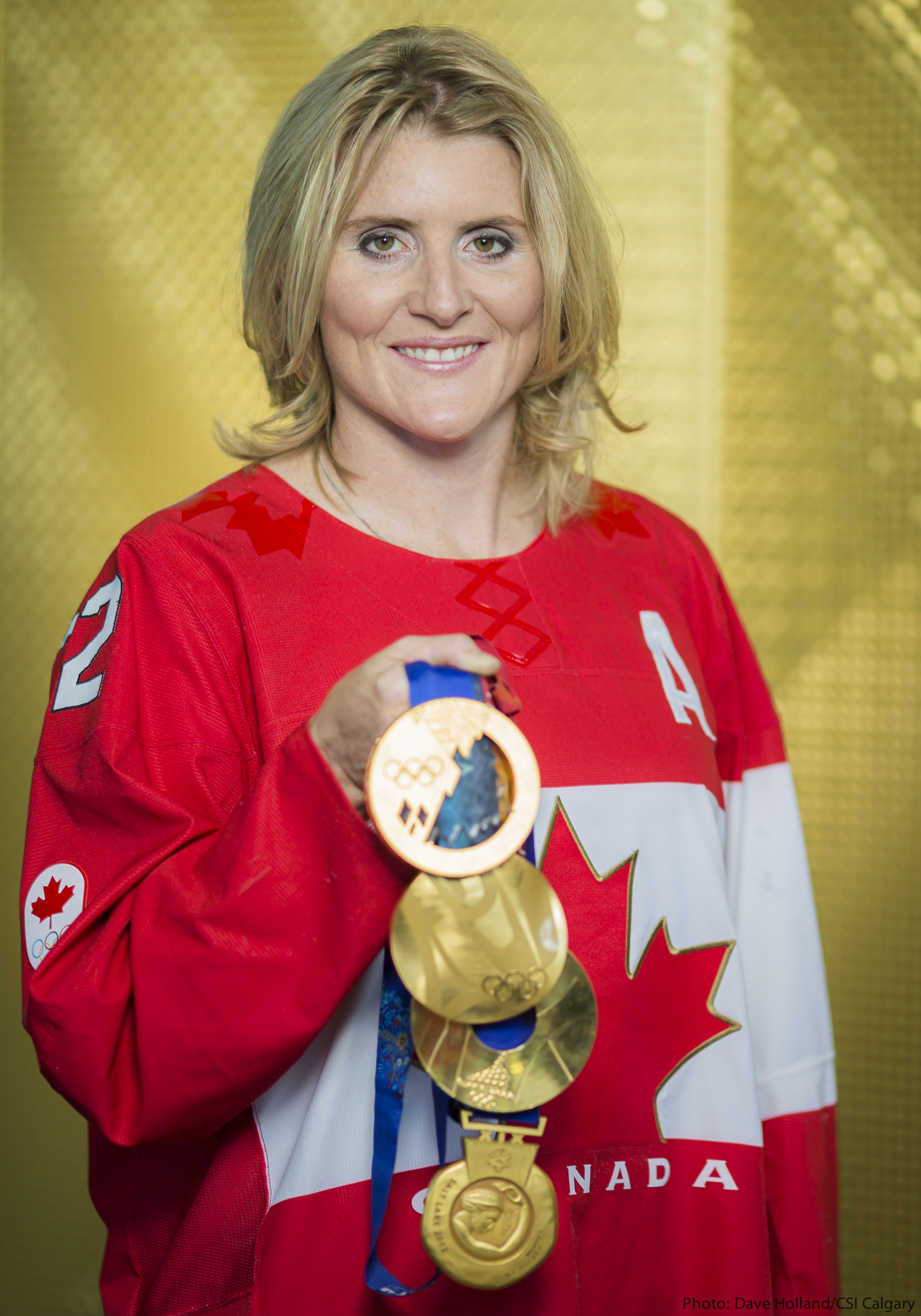
- Wickenheiser in 2014
- Born: August 12, 1978 (age 48) Shaunavon, Saskatchewan, Canada
- Height: 5 ft 9 in (175 cm)
- Weight: 176 lb (80 kg; 12 st 8 lb)
- Position: Centre
- Shot: Right
- Played for: Calgary Oval X-Treme; Edmonton Chimos; HC Salamat; Linden HC; University of Calgary; Calgary Inferno
- National team: Canada
- Playing career: 1993–2017
- Website: Official site
Medal record
Olympic Games
Gold medal – first place	2002 Salt Lake City	Team
Gold medal – first place	2006 Torino	Team
Gold medal – first place	2010 Vancouver	Team
Gold medal – first place	2014 Sochi	Team
Silver medal – second place	1998 Nagano	Team
World Championships
Gold medal – first place	1994 United States
Gold medal – first place	1997 Canada
Gold medal – first place	1999 Finland
Gold medal – first place	2000 Canada
Gold medal – first place	2004 Canada
Gold medal – first place	2007 Canada
Gold medal – first place	2012 United States
Silver medal – second place	2005 Sweden
Silver medal – second place	2008 China
Silver medal – second place	2009 Finland
Silver medal – second place	2011 Switzerland
Silver medal – second place	2013 Canada
Silver medal – second place	2016 Canada

Hayley Wickenheiser (born August 12, 1978) is a Canadian former ice hockey player, physician, and former assistant general manager for the Toronto Maple Leafs. She was the first woman to play full-time professional men's hockey in a position other than goalie. Wickenheiser was a member of Canada women's national ice hockey team for 23 years, from 1994 until announcing her retirement on January 13, 2017, and is the team's career points leader with 168 goals and 211 assists in 276 games. She represented Canada at the Winter Olympics five times, capturing four gold and one silver medal and twice being named tournament MVP, and one time at the Summer Olympics in softball, and is a seven-time winner of the world championships. She is tied with teammates Caroline Ouellette and Jayna Hefford for the record for the most gold medals of any Canadian Olympian, and is widely considered to be the greatest women's ice hockey player of all time. On February 20, 2014, Wickenheiser was elected to the International Olympic Committee's Athletes' Commission. In 2019, she was named to the Hockey Hall of Fame, in her first year of eligibility. She was also inducted into the IIHF Hall of Fame in 2019, and Canada's Sports Hall of Fame in 2022.

== Ice hockey career ==
=== Early years ===
Wickenheiser began playing minor ice hockey on outdoor rinks in her hometown of Shaunavon, Saskatchewan when she was five years old. She played exclusively on boys' teams until she was 13. Wickenheiser continued playing minor hockey in Calgary, Alberta after moving there with her family. In 1991, she represented Alberta at the 18-and-under Canada Winter Games. Alberta captured the gold medal in the tournament, with Wickenheiser scoring the game-winning goal and being named the Most Valuable Player of the final game.

=== International competition ===
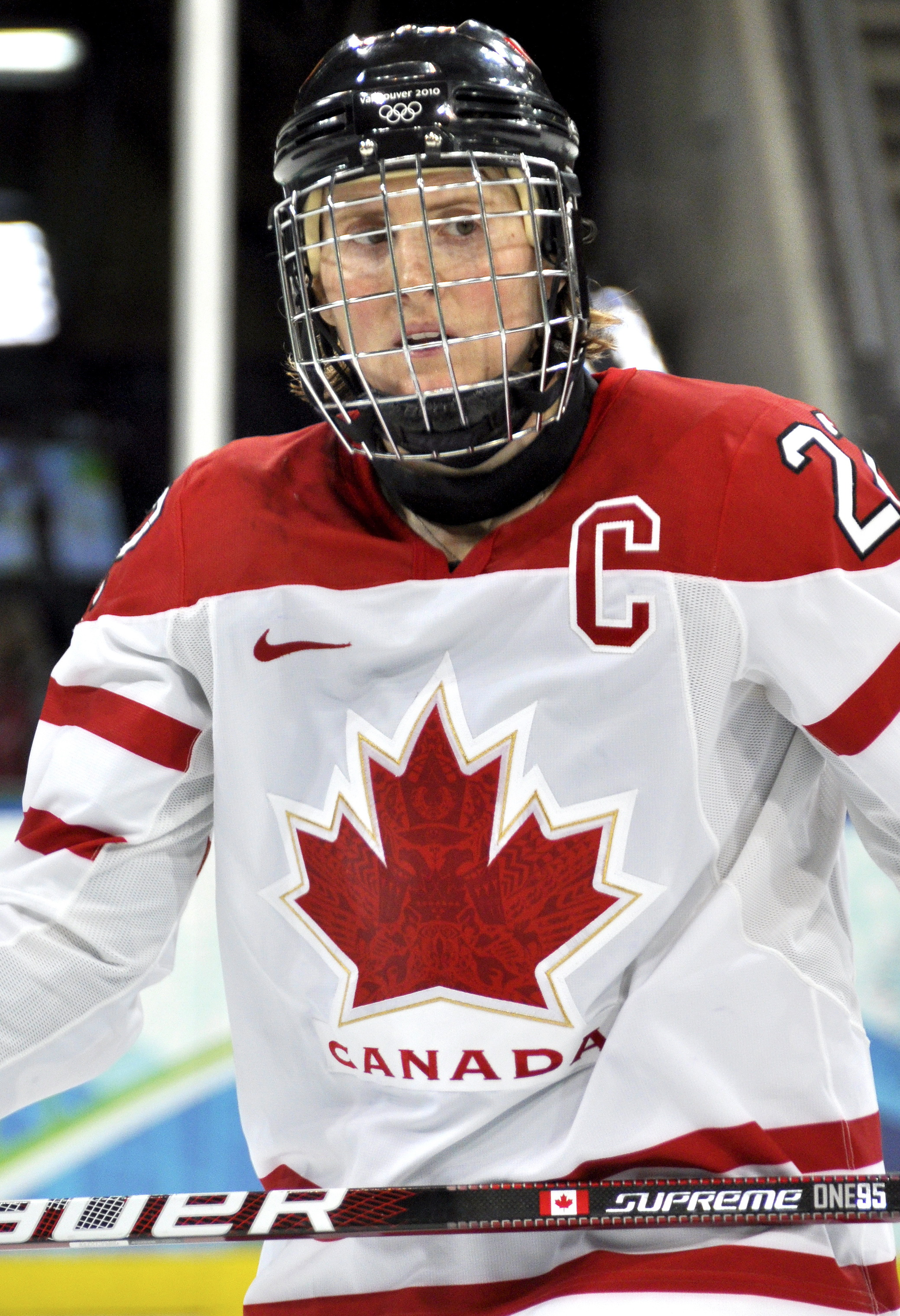
Wickenheiser captained Canada to a gold medal at the 2010 Winter Olympics.

At the age of 15 (1994), Wickenheiser was named to the Canada women's national team for the first time and remained a member until her retirement in 2017. Her first international tournament was the 1994 World Championship, held in Lake Placid, New York. She played three games, and picked up her first international point—an assist, and Canada won gold. Her second World Championship in 1997 also produced a gold medal and she earned a spot on the tournament All-Star team, the first of four such honours (1997, 1999, 2000, 2005). In 1999, Wickenheiser helped Canada to another gold medal and was named tournament MVP. Wickenheiser has seven World Championship gold medals (1994, 1997, 1999, 2000, 2004, 2007, 2012) and three silver medals (2005, 2008, 2009). She was named to Team Canada in 2001, but was unable to compete due to an injury, and was also on Canada's roster for the 2003 World Championship which was cancelled.

Wickenheiser was a member of Team Canada at the 1998 Winter Olympics, when women's hockey was introduced as a medal sport. She also played 21 games for Team Canada during their pre-Olympic tour. Canada won a silver medal at the event and Wickenheiser was named to the tournament all-star team. Her performance at the 1998 Olympics impressed Men's Team Canada General Manager Bobby Clarke so much, that he invited her to participate in the Philadelphia Flyers rookie camps in 1998 and 1999. 2002 was another chance at Olympic gold, and Wickenheiser was named to Canada's roster for the 2002 Winter Olympics held in Salt Lake City, Utah. On Team Canada's pre-Olympic tour, Wickenheiser played 26 games and racked up 36 points. In a bit of redemption for 1998, Canada won the gold medal by defeating Team USA in the final game. Wickenheiser was named Tournament MVP and she was the top scorer on the Women's side. At the 2006 Winter Olympics, Canada was defending its gold medal status. When the final match was set, Canada was facing off against Sweden, a surprise finalist. They won gold again, and Wickenheiser once more was named tournament MVP, Top Forward, and to a berth on the all-star team. She also led the tournament in scoring, with five goals and 17 points in five games.

Wickenheiser captained Canada to a gold medal at the 1998 Christmas Cup (World Women's Under-22 Championship). She has also contributed to at least 10 gold medals for Canada at the 4 Nations Cup tournaments (1996, 1999, 2000, 2001, 2002, 2004, 2005, 2006, 2007, 2010). At the 2006 Four Nations Cup, she served as team captain.

On February 17, 2010, Wickenheiser became the all-time leading Olympic goal scorer as Canada defeated Sweden 13–1 at the Vancouver Olympics. Wickenheiser reached her record total of 16 career Olympic goals by scoring once on Wednesday as Canada followed up their 18–0 win over Slovakia and 10–1 defeat of Switzerland.

Wickenheiser attended the World Hockey Summit in 2010, to address the status of women's hockey internationally. International Olympic Committee president Jacques Rogge stated that the tournament might be eliminated from the Olympics since the event was not competitively balanced. Either Canada and the United States had won the gold since the event began in 1998, and the two countries had also won each IIHF World Women's Championship since the event began in 1990. She explained that the talent gap between the North American and European countries was due to the presence of women's professional leagues in North America, along with year-round training facilities. She stated the European players were talented, but their respective national team programs were not given the same level of support as the European men's national teams, or the North American women's national teams.

With a third and fourth consecutive Olympic gold medal in women's hockey won by defeating the United States 2–0 in Vancouver and 3–2 in Sochi, Wickenheiser won 5 Olympic medals: 4 gold and 1 silver. She is one of only five athletes to win gold in four consecutive Winter Games, along with teammates Jayna Hefford and Caroline Ouellette. At her retirement in 2017 she was the Olympic tournament’s all-time leading scorer with 18 goals and 51 points. Wickenheiser took the athlete's oath in English at the 2010 Winter Olympics opening ceremony in Vancouver, British Columbia and was Canada's flagbearer at the Sochi Winter Olympics in 2014.

=== Women's professional leagues ===
In 1996, Wickenheiser was named MVP of the Esso women's hockey nationals, helping Alberta to a fourth-place finish. In 1997 and 1998, Wickenheiser won Nationals with the Edmonton Chimos and Calgary Oval X-Treme respectively. She was named tournament MVP both years. Between 1999 and 2001, Wickenheiser continued to play for her club teams at the Esso Women's National Championships, winning a gold medal and two silvers. She played 2004–05 with the Calgary Oval X-Treme, in the inaugural season of the Western Women's Hockey League. The X-Treme were league champions. Wickenheiser was the regular season leading scorer and named to the league's all-star team. She also played for Alberta at the Esso National Championships, where they won gold. She led the tournament in scoring and was named MVP.

=== Men's professional leagues ===
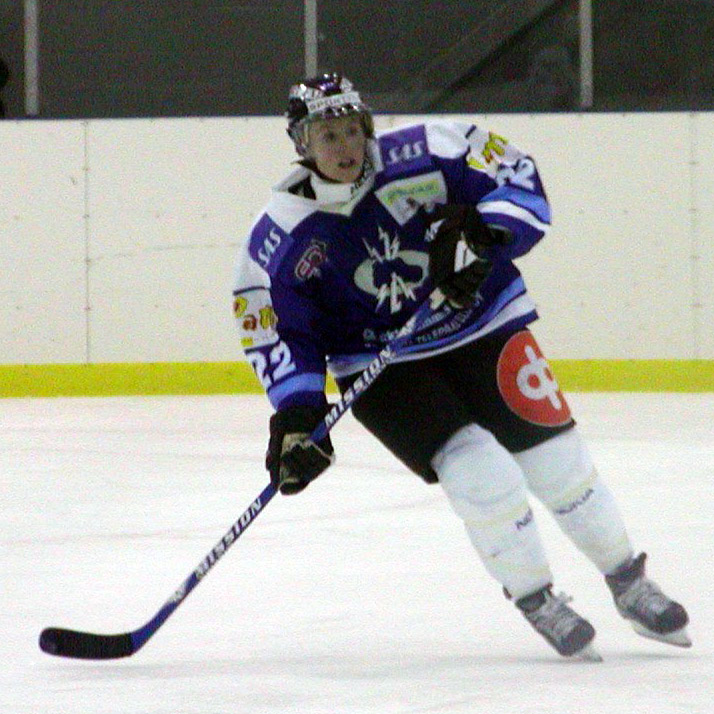
Hayley Wickenheiser playing for Kirkkonummen Salamat in 2003

In 2003, Wickenheiser became the first woman to score a goal playing in a men's semi-professional league (for HC Salamat in Suomi-sarja, Finland's third-division league). Over the course of the two seasons, Wickenheiser played 22 games, scoring 1 goal and 3 assists. Wickenheiser joined a European league to play professional hockey, as the game is more open and less physical than North American leagues. This attempt to play professional hockey was not an entirely smooth process, as Wickenheiser was initially slated to play in Italy, until the Italian Winter Sports Federation ruled that women were ineligible to play in a men's league. She also turned down an offer from Phil Esposito to play for the Cincinnati Cyclones of the ECHL. Finland's Hockey Federation unanimously supported letting women play in a men's league, allowing her to debut with HC Salamat in the Suomi-sarja, the third highest hockey league in Finland, on January 10, 2003. Wickenheiser played briefly with Salamat in 2004. They had won promotion to Mestis, Finland's second tier of professional hockey, and this was not as good a fit for her. She left the team after ten games.

In 2007, Wickenheiser had a week-long tryout contract with Swedish club IFK Arboga IK in the Swedish male third league. After two practice games, where Wickenheiser scored two goals in the first game, she was not offered a contract. In 2008, Wickenheiser signed a one-year contract with Eskilstuna Linden, also in the Swedish men's third league.

Wickenheiser was named one of the "Top 100 Most Influential People in Hockey" by The Hockey News—ranked #59 on the 2011 List—one of the "25 Toughest Athletes" by Sports Illustrated, and one of the "Top 50 Most Powerful Women in Canada" by The Globe and Mail.

Wickenheiser scored a goal as a member of Team Black in the 2nd Canadian Women's Hockey League All-Star Game. Appearing with the Calgary Inferno in the 2016 Clarkson Cup finals, she logged two assists as the Inferno emerged victorious in a convincing 8-3 final.

=== Canadian university hockey ===
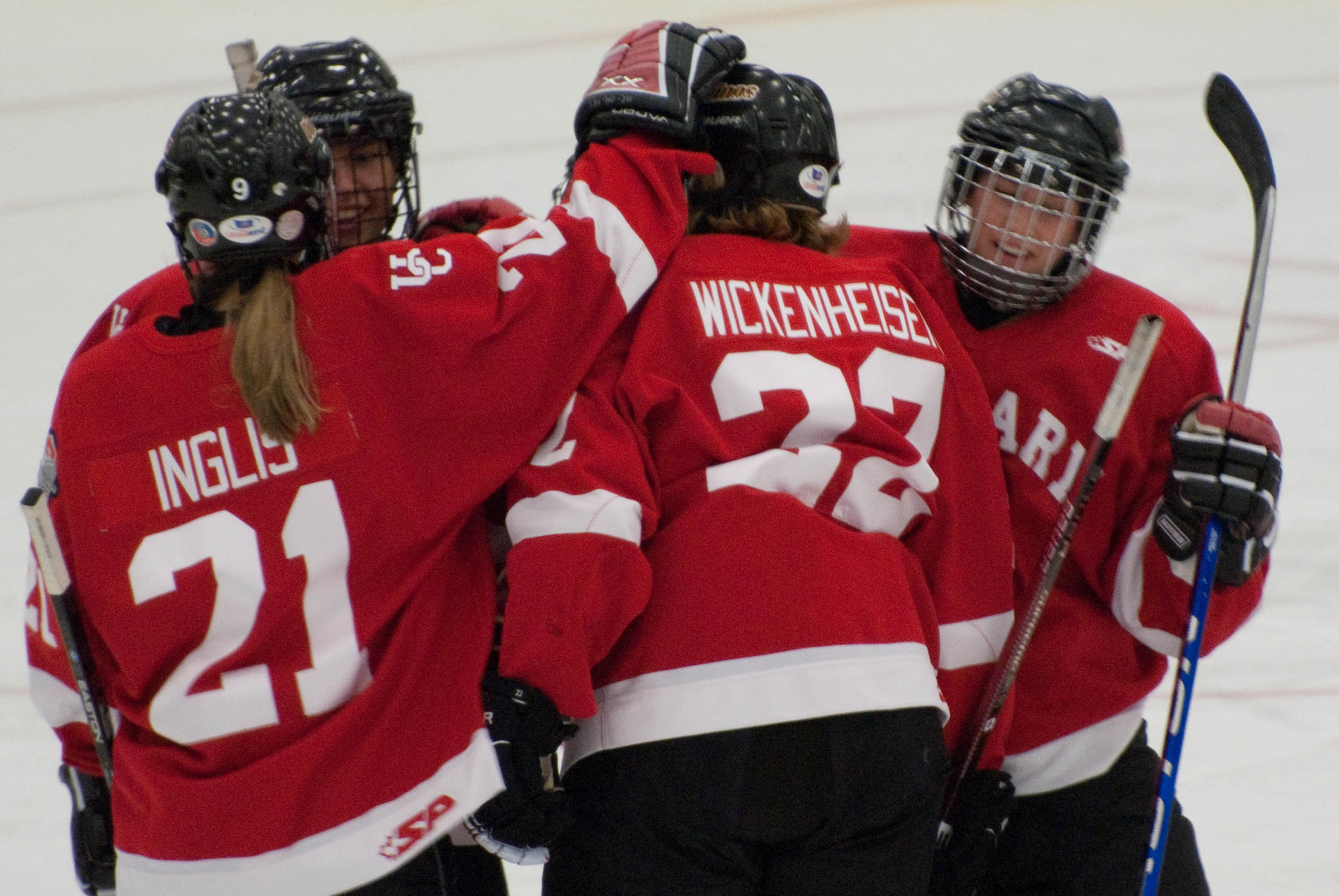
Hayley Wickenheiser celebrates her first CIS goal with her University of Calgary teammates

Wickenheiser joined the 2010–11 Calgary Dinos women's ice hockey team that competes in the Canadian Interuniversity Sport (CIS). The Dinos were playing their second season of CIS hockey, and Wickenheiser was expected to provide leadership to a young team. While with the Dinos, Wickenheiser played for her former teammate, Danielle Goyette, the team's head coach. Wickenheiser also completed a degree in kinesiology at Calgary. The Dinos were Wickenheiser's choice because the team practices every day, and she was able to stay in Calgary with her family. Under CIS rules, Wickenheiser began her first year of eligibility in 2010 because she had never played university hockey. Players have up to five years of eligibility. In her CIS debut against the University of Regina, Wickenheiser scored two goals and added an assist in a 4–3 victory. There were 587 people in attendance. Wickenheiser was named the Canada West female athlete of the week on November 2, 2010 after scoring three goals and adding an assist in two games against the University of Alberta. Despite only playing in 15 of the Dino's 24 regular season games, Wickenheiser finished tied for the conference lead in scoring with 40 points (17 goals and 23 assists), and finishing with a plus-minus of +22. She scored four short handed goals, and had five game winners. At the end of the year, Wickenheiser was named the Canada West Most Valuable Player, and captured a spot on the conference's First All-Star Team. On March 9, 2011, Wickenheiser was named the Canadian Interuniversity Sport player of the year in women's hockey. She then became the first ever Dino to win the Brodrick Trophy as CIS MVP.

In the aftermath of the 2012-13 season, Wickenheiser was named to the CIS First Team All-Canadians. Among the other players named as First Team All-Canadians were Melodie Daoust and Katelyn Gosling.

=== Post-playing career ===
On January 13, 2017, Wickenheiser announced her retirement from professional hockey to pursue medical school. On August 23, 2018, Wickenheiser was hired as the assistant director of player development for the Toronto Maple Leafs. On May 17, 2021, Wickenheiser was promoted to senior director of player development for the Toronto Maple Leafs.

In 2021 she collaborated with sports equipment maker Verbero Hockey and owner/CEO Andy Sutton in developing the "Wick Stick", part of a program to create branded equipment targeted toward women.

In 2022, Bell Media and Uninterrupted released a documentary film chronicling her life titled WICK.

In July 2022, she was named assistant general manager for the Toronto Maple Leafs. On July 10, 2026, she was among several executives fired by the Maple Leafs.

== Softball career ==
Wickenheiser is an accomplished softball player. On June 24, 2000, she was named to the Canadian softball team for the 2000 Summer Olympics. This was the culmination of a long ball career. In 1994, she participated at Canadian Midget Nationals, where she was named All-Canadian Shortstop and Top Batter. In 1995, Wickenheiser was a member of Team Canada at the World Junior Fastball Championships, held in Normal, Illinois. Canada finished fifth at this event. In 1997, Wickenheiser participated at Midget Nationals with the Silver Springs 76ers. Her team finished second and Wickenheiser was again named All Star Shortstop and Top Batter. In 1999, she also participated at Senior Nationals, where her team finished fourth. In 2000, Wickenheiser attended and competed for Simon Fraser University, and helped lead the team to a 38 and 13 record, en route to a 3rd-place finish at the NAIA National Championships. Later that summer she competed in the Summer Olympic games in Sydney, Australia, where she led Canada with the team's highest batting average. Canada was competitive, but finished the tournament with a 1–6 record, losing three games by one run. Since that Olympics, Wickenheiser has not been as active in softball.

== Personal life ==
Wickenheiser is the daughter of physical education teachers, Tom and Marilyn, and has a brother and a sister. Wickenheiser lives in Calgary with her son, Noah. Former professional hockey player Doug Wickenheiser was her cousin, as well as his daughter, soccer player Carly Wickenheiser.

Wickenheiser's life story is the subject of a 2005 children's book written by Elizabeth Etue, titled Born to Play. On July 15, 2011, her hometown of Shaunavon named a new 14 million dollar recreational complex after her, Crescent Point Wickenheiser Centre. On June 30, 2011, she was named an Officer of the Order of Canada by Governor General David Johnston.

Wickenheiser graduated with a degree in kinesiology in 2013. After retiring from professional hockey, she completed medical school at the University of Calgary's Cumming School of Medicine in 2021. She completed her family medicine residency at University of Toronto's Department of Family and Community Medicine in 2023 and is currently pursuing an enhanced skills program in emergency medicine.

Hayley is the author of Gold Medal Diary – Inside the World's Greatest Sports Event, outlining her training with Team Canada and the events leading up to, during, and following the 2010 Winter Olympic Games.

She is the founder of WickFest, an annual event showcasing girls' and women's hockey, inviting female players from all over the world to several days of workshops, clinics and games learning from leading instructors, coaches and players.

== Video game appearance ==
EA Sports officially announced in September 2012 that Wickenheiser would be among the first two female hockey players featured in the NHL video game series, set to appear in NHL 13 along with Angela Ruggiero.

== Career statistics ==
=== Regular season and playoffs ===
==== Women's Leagues ====
			Regular season					Playoffs
Season	Team	League	GP	G	A	Pts	PIM	GP	G	A	Pts	PIM
1997–98	Calgary Oval X-Treme	EWNC	—	—	—	—	—	—	—	—	—	—
1998–99	Calgary Oval X-Treme	EWNC	—	—	—	—	—	—	—	—	—	—
1999–00	Calgary Oval X-Treme	EWNC	—	—	—	—	—	—	—	—	—	—
2000–01	Calgary Oval X-Treme	EWNC	—	—	—	—	—	—	—	—	—	—
2002–03	Edmonton Chimos	NWHL	11	4	2	6	16	—	—	—	—	—
2003–04	Calgary Oval X-Treme	NWHL	9	11	6	17	10	—	—	—	—	—
2004–05	Calgary Oval X-Treme	WWHL	18	22	36	58	20	—	—	—	—	—
2006–07	Calgary Oval X-Treme	WWHL	14	27	21	48	16	—	—	—	—	—
2007–08	Calgary Oval X-Treme	WWHL	19	19	30	49	20	—	—	—	—	—
2010–11	University of Calgary	CIS	15	17	23	40	32	2	0	3	3	6
2011–12	University of Calgary	CIS	16	17	15	32	60	—	—	—	—	—
2012–13	University of Calgary	CIS	22	16	27	43	14	6	1	5	6	18
2014–15	University of Calgary	CIS	15	5	14	19	16	—	—	—	—	—
2015–16	Calgary Inferno	CWHL	23	3	13	16	10	3	1	2	3	0
2016–17	Calgary Inferno	CWHL	—	—	—	—	—	—	—	—	—	—
WWHL/NWHL totals			71	83	95	178	82	—	—	—	—	—
CWHL totals			23	3	13	16	10	3	1	2	3	0

==== Men's Leagues ====
			Regular season					Playoffs
Season	Team	League	GP	G	A	Pts	PIM	GP	G	A	Pts	PIM
2002–03	HC Salamat	Suomi-sarja	12	1	3	4	6	11	1	6	7	4
2003–04	HC Salamat	Mestis	10	0	0	0	2	–	–	–	–	–
2008–09	Linden HC	Division 1	21	1	2	3	10	–	–	–	–	–
Totals			43	2	5	7	18	11	1	6	7	4

=== International ===
Year	Team	Event	Result	GP	G	A	Pts	PIM
1994	Canada	WC	1st place, gold medalist(s)	3	0	1	1	0
1997	Canada	WC	1st place, gold medalist(s)	5	4	5	9	4
1998	Canada	OG	2nd place, silver medalist(s)	6	2	6	8	4
1999	Canada	WC	1st place, gold medalist(s)	5	3	5	8	8
2000	Canada	WC	1st place, gold medalist(s)	5	1	7	8	4
2002	Canada	OG	1st place, gold medalist(s)	5	7	3	10	2
2004	Canada	WC	1st place, gold medalist(s)	5	3	2	5	2
2005	Canada	WC	2nd place, silver medalist(s)	5	5	3	8	6
2006	Canada	OG	1st place, gold medalist(s)	5	5	12	17	6
2007	Canada	WC	1st place, gold medalist(s)	5	8	6	14	0
2008	Canada	WC	2nd place, silver medalist(s)	3	3	4	7	6
2009	Canada	WC	2nd place, silver medalist(s)	5	4	4	8	4
2010	Canada	OG	1st place, gold medalist(s)	5	2	9	11	0
2011	Canada	WC	2nd place, silver medalist(s)	5	4	1	5	4
2012	Canada	WC	1st place, gold medalist(s)	5	3	7	10	4
2014	Canada	OG	1st place, gold medalist(s)	5	2	3	5	0
2016	Canada	WC	2nd place, silver medalist(s)	5	0	1	1	0
WC Totals				56	38	46	74	42
OG Totals				26	18	33	51	12

Source for all stats: EliteProspects

== Awards and honours ==
- 2004 Honorary Degree Recipient, Nipissing University.
- 2007 Most Valuable Player, Pool A, Esso Canadian Women's Nationals
- 2007 Bobbie Rosenfeld Award
- 2010 Gave the athlete's Olympic Oath at the 2010 Olympic Games
- 2011 Canada West Player of the Year
- 2011 Brodrick Trophy Winner (Most Outstanding Player in USports women's ice hockey)
- 2011 Officer of the Order of Canada
- 2011 Media All-Star team, IIHF Women's World Championship
- 2014 Canada's Walk of Fame
- 2014 Athletes in Excellence Award from The Foundation for Global Sports Development, in recognition of her community service efforts and work with youth
- 2017 CAAWS Wall of Influence Award
- 2019 Hockey Hall of Fame
- 2019 IIHF Hall of Fame
- 2021 Canada West Hall of Fame
- 2022 Canada's Sports Hall of Fame

== See also ==
- List of athletes with the most appearances at Olympic Games

Awards and achievements
Preceded by Cassie Campbell (2002, 2006)	Captain, Canadian Olympic Hockey Team; 2010	Succeeded by Caroline Ouellette (2014)
Preceded by Jayna Hefford (2005)	IIHF World Women's Championships Best Forward; 2007	Succeeded by Natalie Darwitz (2008)
Preceded by Natalie Darwitz (2008)	IIHF World Women's Championships Best Forward; 2009	Succeeded by Monique Lamoureux-Kolls (2011)
Preceded by Krissy Wendell (2005)	IIHF World Women's Championships Most Valuable Player; 2007	Succeeded by Noora Räty (2008)
Olympic Games
Preceded by Simon Whitfield	Flagbearer for Canada; Sochi 2014	Succeeded by Rosie MacLennan
