= 2025–26 Penn State Nittany Lions women's ice hockey season =

AHA Regular Season AHA Championship Frozen Four Semifinals, L 3–4 OT vs. Wisconsin
- Conference: Atlantic Hockey America
- Home ice: Pegula Ice Arena

Rankings
- USA Today: #3
- USCHO.com: #3

Record
- Overall: 33–6–0
- Conference: 22–2–0
- Home: 18–2–0
- Road: 15–4–0

Coaches and captains
- Head coach: Jeff Kampersal (9th season)
- Assistant coaches: Makenna Newkirk; Moe Bradley; Jennifer Wakefield
- Captain: Tessa Janecke
- Alternate captain(s): Mya Vaslet; Katelyn Roberts; Kendall Butze; Maddy Christian; Leah Stecker
- Penn State Nittany Lions women's ice hockey seasons « 2024–25 2026–27 »

The 2025–26 Penn State Nittany Lions women's ice hockey season will represent Pennsylvania State University during the 2025–26 NCAA Division I women's ice hockey season.

== Offseason ==
=== Recruiting ===
Player	Position	Class	Previous school
Madison Campbell	Goaltender	Incoming freshman	
Matilde Fantin	Forward	Incoming freshman	
Lauren Hernick	Forward	Incoming freshman	
Mikah Keller	Forward	Incoming freshman	
Taylor Lum	Forward	Graduate	St. Lawrence
Danica Maynard	Defense	Incoming freshman	
Sophie Morrow	Defense	Incoming freshman	
Shelby Shane	Defense	Incoming freshman	

=== Departures ===
Player	Position	Class	Previous school
Lauren Barbro	Goaltender	Senior	Left program
Brianna Brooks	Forward	PWHL Vancouver	
Karley Garcia	Defense	Graduated	
Tiffany Hill	Forward	Graduated	
Lyndie Lobdell	Defense	PWHL Seattle	
Alyssa Machado	Forward	Graduated	
Stella Retrum	Forward	Junior	Vermont
Annie Spring	Goaltender	Graduated	

=== PWHL Draft ===
Round	Player	Position	Team
2	Kiara Zanon	Forward	Toronto Sceptres
4	Brianna Brooks	Forward	PWHL Vancouver
5	Lyndie Lobdell	Defense	PWHL Seattle

=== Preseason ===
The Nittany Lions were picked to finish first in the Atlantic Hockey America preseason coaches' poll. Tessa Janecke was picked as the preseason player of the year. Janecke, Katelyn Roberts, Kendall Butze, and Katie DeSa were all voted onto the all-AHA team.

== Standings ==
2025–26 Atlantic Hockey America standings
	Conference							Overall					
	GP	W	L	T	PTS	GF	GA	GP	W	L	T	GF	GA
#3 Penn State †*	24	22	2	0	68	117	27	39	33	6	0	165	54
#12 Mercyhurst	24	17	5	2	49	85	42	37	23	11	3	117	73
RIT	24	11	13	0	34	71	67	34	16	18	0	100	88
Lindenwood	24	11	12	1	35	67	78	37	14	21	2	95	119
Syracuse	24	10	11	3	33	44	66	37	15	18	4	69	106
Robert Morris	24	8	14	2	28	52	73	36	13	21	2	82	102
Delaware	24	1	23	0	5	24	107	33	2	31	0	35	141
Championship: March 7, 2026 † indicates conference regular season champion; * indicates conference tournament champion Rankings: USCHO.com; updated March 20, 2026

== Roster ==
As of September 19, 2025.

No.	Nat.	Player	Class	Pos	Height	DoB	Hometown	Previous team
2	(United States)	Grace Tullock	Sophomore	D	5' 9" (1.75 m)	2006-04-24	Burnt Hills, New York	North American Hockey Academy
7	(Canada)	Taya MacDonald	Sophomore	D	5' 11" (1.8 m)	2005-07-13	London, Ontario	Rink HA Kelowna Prep
8	(Canada)	Grace Outwater	Sophomore	F	5' 8" (1.73 m)	2006-10-10	Picton, Ontario	Ottawa Lady Jr. Sens
9	(United States)	Shelby Shane	Freshman	D	5' 4" (1.63 m)	2007-04-02	Kutztown, Pennsylvania	Philadelphia Jr. Flyers
10	(United States)	Leah Stecker (A)	Senior	D	5' 9" (1.75 m)	2003-11-00	Randolph, New Jersey	Philadelphia Jr. Flyers
11	(Canada)	Abby Stonehouse	Sophomore	F	5' 4" (1.63 m)	2006-03-30	Blenheim, Ontario	Waterloo Ravens
12	(United States)	McKenna Walsh	Sophomore	F	5' 1" (1.55 m)	2006-06-07	Oswego, Illinois	Chicago Mission
15	(United States)	Tessa Janecke (C)	Senior	F	5' 8" (1.73 m)	2004-05-12	Orangeville, Illinois	North America Hockey Academy
17	(United States)	Kendall Butze (A)	Senior	D	5' 3" (1.6 m)	2003-08-03	Cleveland, Ohio	Bishop Kearney Selects;
19	(Canada)	Mya Vaslet (A)	Graduate	F	5' 9" (1.75 m)	2003-04-06	Stittsville, Ontario	Etobicoke Jr. Dolphins
20	(Italy)	Matilde Fantin	Freshman	F	5' 7" (1.7 m)	2007-01-01	Como, Italy	HC Lugano
21	(Sweden)	Nicole Hall	Sophomore	F	5' 5" (1.65 m)	2004-03-24	Stockholm, Sweden	Djurgarden
22	(United States)	Katelyn Roberts (A)	Senior	F	5' 7" (1.7 m)	2004-04-12	Chanhassen, Minnesota	Chanhassen High School
24	(Canada)	Taylor Lum	Graduate	F	5' 3" (1.6 m)	2002-04-01	Etobicoke, Ontario	St. Lawrence
25	(United States)	Sophie Morrow	Freshman	D	5' 11" (1.8 m)	2007-05-01	Darien, Connecticut	Shattuck-Saint Mary's
26	(United States)	Maddy Christian (A)	Senior	F	5' 7" (1.7 m)	2003-12-24	Elk River, Minnesota	Elk River High School
27	(Canada)	Danica Maynard	Freshman	D	5' 2" (1.57 m)	2007-03-19	Lake Country, British Columbia	Rink HA Kelowna Prep
28	(United States)	Mikah Keller	Freshman	F	5' 7" (1.7 m)	2006-03-19	Mosinee, Wisconsin	North American Hockey Academy
32	(United States)	Lauren Hernick	Freshman	G	5' 3" (1.6 m)	2007-00-00	Frankenmuth, Michigan	Philadelphia Jr. Flyers
35	(United States)	Katie DeSa	Senior	G	5' 8" (1.73 m)	2004-01-21	Pawcatuck, Connecticut	Boston Jr. Eagles
45	(Canada)	Maddy Campbell	Freshman	G	5' 6" (1.68 m)	2007-06-30	Courtice, Ontario	Durham West

== Schedule and results ==
Date	Time	Opponent^{#}	Rank^{#}	Site	Decision	Result	Attendance	Record	Ref
Regular Season
September 25	6:00 PM	#9 St. Lawrence*	#8	Pegula Ice Arena • University Park, PA	DeSa	W 3–0	637	1–0–0	
September 26	3:00 PM	#9 St. Lawrence*	#8	Pegula Ice Arena • University Park, PA	DeSa	W 5–2	821	2–0–0	
October 3	6:00 PM	at Vermont*	#6	Gutterson Fieldhouse • Burlington, VT	DeSa	W 3–1	564	3–0–0	
October 4	2:00 PM	at Vermont*	#6	Gutterson Fieldhouse • Burlington, VT	DeSa	W 5–3	395	4–0–0	
October 10	6:00 PM	at Delaware	#6	Fred Rust Ice Arena • Newark, DE	DeSa	W 5–0	373	5–0–0 (1–0–0)	
October 11	2:00 PM	at Delaware	#6	Fred Rust Ice Arena • Newark, DE	Campbell	W 7–0	350	6–0–0 (2–0–0)	
October 17	3:00 PM	#15 Mercyhurst	#6	Pegula Ice Arena • University Park, PA	DeSa	W 3–0	484	7–0–0 (3–0–0)	
October 18	1:00 PM	#15 Mercyhurst	#6	Pegula Ice Arena • University Park, PA	DeSa	W 6–1	856	8–0–0 (4–0–0)	
October 24	2:00 PM	Lindenwood	#6	Pegula Ice Arena • University Park, PA	DeSa	W 6–1	338	9–0–0 (5–0–0)	
October 25	1:00 PM	Lindenwood	#6	Pegula Ice Arena • University Park, PA	Campbell	W 5–0	622	10–0–0 (6–0–0)	
October 31	3:00 PM	at Robert Morris	#6	Clearview Arena • Moon Township, PA	DeSa	W 4–0	412	11–0–0 (7–0–0)	
November 1	5:00 PM	at Robert Morris	#6	Clearview Arena • Moon Township, PA	DeSa	W 4–0	476	12–0–0 (8–0–0)	
November 14	2:00 PM	Syracuse	#6	Pegula Ice Arena • University Park, PA	DeSa	W 7–0	393	13–0–0 (9–0–0)	
November 15	1:00 PM	Syracuse	#6	Pegula Ice Arena • University Park, PA	DeSa	W 11–2	875	14–0–0 (10–0–0)	
November 21	6:00 PM	at RIT	#6	Gene Polisseni Center • Rochester, NY	DeSa	W 5–3	873	15–0–0 (11–0–0)	
November 22	3:00 PM	at RIT	#6	Gene Polisseni Center • Rochester, NY	DeSa	W 4–3	638	16–0–0 (12–0–0)	
November 28	3:00 PM	at #7 Northeastern*	#4	Matthews Arena • Boston, MA	DeSa	L 2–3	901	16–1–0	
November 29	2:00 PM	at #7 Northeastern*	#4	Dorothy Talbot Skating Rink • Boston, MA	DeSa	W 4–1	1,023	17–1–0	
December 30	6:00 PM	#10 Cornell*	#4	Pegula Ice Arena • University Park, PA	DeSa	W 1–0	1,231	18–1–0	
January 2	6:00 PM	at #2 Ohio State*	#4	Ohio State University Ice Rink • Columbus, OH	DeSa	L 1–5	682	18–2–0	
January 3	3:00 PM	at #2 Ohio State*	#4	Ohio State University Ice Rink • Columbus, OH	Campbell	L 1–4	676	18–3–0	
January 9	3:00 PM	at Mercyhurst	#4	Mercyhurst Ice Center • Erie, PA	Campbell	W 3–0	245	19–3–0 (13–0–0)	
January 10	1:00 PM	at Mercyhurst	#4	Mercyhurst Ice Center • Erie, PA	Campbell	L 3–4 ^{OT}	479	19–4–0 (13–1–0)	
January 16	6:00 PM	at Syracuse	#4	Tennity Ice Pavilion • Syracuse, NY	Campbell	W 4–1	144	20–4–0 (14–1–0)	
January 17	3:00 PM	at Syracuse	#4	Tennity Ice Pavilion • Syracuse, NY	Campbell	W 3–2	167	21–4–0 (15–1–0)	
January 20	6:00 PM	at #13 Cornell*	#4	Lynah Rink • Ithaca, NY	DeSa	W 5–1	900	22–4–0	
January 23	6:00 PM	Delaware	#4	Pegula Ice Arena • University Park, PA	Campbell	W 5–0	683	23–4–0 (16–1–0)	
January 24	2:00 PM	Delaware	#4	Pegula Ice Arena • University Park, PA	DeSa	W 7–0	806	24–4–0 (17–1–0)	
January 30	1:00 PM	Robert Morris	#4	Beaver Stadium • University Park, PA	DeSa	W 3–0	1,838	25–4–0 (18–1–0)	
January 31	6:00 PM	Robert Morris	#4	Pegula Ice Arena • University Park, PA	DeSa	W 5–2	1,101	26–4–0 (19–1–0)	
February 6	5:00 PM	at Lindenwood	#4	Centene Community Ice Center • Maryland Heights, MO	DeSa	W 6–3	217	27–4–0 (20–1–0)	
February 7	2:00 PM	at Lindenwood	#4	Centene Community Ice Center • Maryland Heights, MO	DeSa	W 5–0	114	28–4–0 (21–1–0)	
February 13	6:00 PM	RIT	#4	Pegula Ice Arena • University Park, PA	DeSa	L 2-3 ^{OT}	641	28–5–0 (21–2–0)	
February 14	2:00 PM	RIT	#4	Pegula Ice Arena • University Park, PA	DeSa	W 4-2	1,462	29–5–0 (22–2–0)	
CHA Tournament
February 27	6:00 PM	Syracuse	#3	Pegula Ice Arena • University Park, PA (Semifinals)	DeSa	W 7–0	924	30–5–0	
February 28	3:00 PM	Syracuse	#3	Pegula Ice Arena • University Park, PA (Semifinals)	DeSa	W 2–1	862	31–5–0	
March 7	2:00 PM	#12 Mercyhurst	#3	Pegula Ice Arena • University Park, PA (Championship)	DeSa	W 3–2	1,246	32–5–0	
NCAA Tournament
March 14	2:00 PM	#6 UConn	#3	Pegula Ice Arena • University Park, PA (Quarterfinals)	DeSa	W 3–0	1,615	33–5–0	
March 20	7:30 PM	#2 Wisconsin	#3	Pegula Ice Arena • University Park, PA (Frozen Four)	DeSa	L 3–4 ^{OT}	5,176	33–6–0	
*Non-conference game. ^{#}Rankings from USCHO.com Poll. All times are in Eastern Time. Source:

== Awards ==
- Katie DeSa: AHA Goalie of the Week (September 30, 2025)
- Leah Stecker: AHA Defender of the Week (October 7, 2025)
- Matilde Fantin: AHA Forward of the Week (October 14, 2025)
- Danica Maynard: AHA Defender of the Week (October 14, 2025)
- Tessa Janecke: AHA Forward of the Week (October 21, 2025)
- Danica Maynard: AHA Defender of the Week (October 21, 2025)
- Katie DeSa: AHA Goalie of the Week (October 21, 2025)
- Matilde Fantin: AHA Rookie of the Week (October 28, 2025)
- Tessa Janecke: AHA Forward of the Month (September/October 2025)
- Danica Maynard: AHA Defender of the Month (September/October 2025)
- Katie DeSa: AHA Goalie of the Month (September/October 2025)
- Matilde Fantin: AHA Rookie of the Month (September/October 2025)
- Katie DeSa: AHA Goalie of the Week (November 4, 2025)
- Katelyn Roberts: AHA Forward of the Week (November 18, 2025)
- Kendall Butze: AHA Defender of the Week (November 18, 2025)
- Tessa Janecke: AHA Forward of the Week (November 25, 2025)
- Danica Maynard: AHA Defender of the Week (November 25, 2025)
- Tessa Janecke: AHA Forward of the Month (November 2025)
- Katie DeSa: AHA Goalie of the Month (November 2025)
- Tessa Janecke: AHA Forward of the Week (January 13, 2026)
- Katie DeSa: National Goalie of the Year Watchlist
- Regular Season Champion (January 24, 2026)
- Kendall Butze: AHA Defender of the Week (January 27, 2026)
- Mikah Keller: AHA Rookie of the Week (January 27, 2026)
- Kendall Butze: AHA Defender of the Month (February 2026)
