= 2026 NEWHA women's tournament =

2026 NEWHA Women's ice hockey tournament
- Dates: February 27 – March 7, 2026
- Teams: 8
- Finals site: Jason Ritchie Ice Arena; Winchendon, Massachusetts
- Champions: Franklin Pierce Ravems (2nd title)
- Winning coach: David Stockdale (2nd title)
- MVP: Jill Hertl (Franklin Pierce)
- NEWHA Women's Ice Hockey Tournaments

The 2026 NEWHA Women's Tournament was the 7th edition of the NEWHA Women's Tournament. It was played between February 27 and March 7, 2026. Sacred Heart enters the tournament as the defending champions.

Franklin Pierce was the regular season champions and earned the top seed in the tournament. The Ravens earned their second title by winning the tournament. They earned the conference's automatic bid to the 2026 women's ice hockey tournament.

== Format ==
The tournament includes all eight teams. The top four seeds host the bottom four seeds in a best-of-three quarterfinal series. The semifinals and championship will be single-elimination.

== Standings ==
2025–26 NEWHA standings
	Conference							Overall			
	GP	W	L	T	PTS	GF	GA	GP	W	L	T
Franklin Pierce †*	28	18	8	2	57	83	55	32	19	11	2
Assumption	28	17	8	3	55	89	48	34	17	14	3
Saint Anselm	28	16	11	1	52	92	67	34	16	17	1
Stonehill	28	16	10	2	49	81	63	34	16	16	2
LIU	28	16	11	1	47	62	59	34	18	15	1
Sacred Heart	28	12	14	2	39	69	63	34	13	19	2
Post	28	10	17	1	33	51	71	34	10	23	1
Saint Michael's	28	1	27	0	4	25	162	32	1	31	0
Championship: March 7, 2026 † indicates conference regular season champion; * indicates conference tournament champion Rankings: USCHO.com; updated February 22, 2026; Source: NEWHA

== Bracket ==
Quarterfinals; February 27–March 1
8	Saint Michael's	0	1	—
1	Franklin Pierce	8	5	—
5	LIU	0	3	—
4	Stonehill	3	4*	—
6	Sacred Heart	2	1	—
3	Saint Anselm	3	3	—
7	Post	1	2	2
2	Assumption	2*	1	4

Semifinals; March 4
4	Stonehill	1
1	Franklin Pierce	2**
3	Saint Anselm	2
2	Assumption	1

Championship; March 7
3	Saint Anselm	0
1	Franklin Pierce	2

== Results ==
=== Quarterfinals ===
==== (8) Saint Michael's at (1) Franklin Pierce ====
February 27, 2026; 7:00 PM	Saint Michael's	0–8 (0–1, 0–2, 0–5)	Franklin Pierce	Jason Ritchie Ice Arena, Winchendon, Massachusetts; Attendance: 64

Annika Lavender
McKenna Dans
Goalies
Jill Hertl
Referees:
Tom Reed
William O'Malley
Linesmen:
Ryan Gough
Patrick Liddy

0–1	12:50 – sh – Murphy
0–2	25:58 – Dean (Grimm, Wilson)
0–3	27:41 – pp – Valeri (Broz, Levinson)
0–4	40:38 – pp – Levinson (Korneta, Targosz)
0–5	41:54 – Murphy (Andre, Broz)
0–6	44:34 – pp – Levinson (Broz, Targosz)
0–7	55:58 – Dean (Aanenson, Parry)
0–8	58:49 – Murphy (Anderson)

12 min
Penalties
10 min
25
Shots
52

February 28, 2026; 7:00 PM	Saint Michael's	1–5 (1–1, 0–2, 0–2)	Franklin Pierce	Jason Ritchie Ice Arena, Winchendon, Massachusetts; Attendance: 116

Annika Lavender
Goalies
Jill Hertl
Referees:
Tom Reed
William O'Malley
Linesmen:
Ryan Gough
Patrick Liddy

Quinn (Gerebi) – 3:32	1–0
	1–1	5:16 – pp – Broz (Targosz, Korneta)
	1–2	24:13 – Andre (Korneta, Broz)
	1–3	27:43 – pp – Broz (Targosz, Korneta)
	1–4	42:27 – Anderson (Valeri, Bauer)
	1–5	56:35 – en – Murphy (Broz, Parry)

8 min
Penalties
12 min
19
Shots
61

==== (7) Post at (2) Assumption ====
February 27, 2026; 3:00 PM	Post	1–2 OT (1–0, 0–0 0–1); OT: (0–1)	Assumption	Worcester Ice Center, Worcester, Massachusetts; Attendance: 281

Hannah Saunders
Goalies
Jadyn Weiser
Referees:
Sarah Delaney
John Kanaris
Linesmen:
Paul Lennon
Clayton Shurdho

Stevens (Rose, Grom) – pp – 12:42	1-0
	1-1	44:09 – pp – Cielo (Hanrahan, Ajakie)
	1-2	77:12 – Gratton (Hanrahan, Agerter)

12 min
Penalties
6 min
36
Shots
52

February 28, 2026; 4:10 PM	Post	2–1 (1–0, 1–1, 0–0)	Assumption	Worcester Ice Center, Worcester, Massachusetts; Attendance: 228

Hannah Saunders
Goalies
Jadyn Weiser
Referees:
Sarah Delaney
John Kanaris
Linesmen:
Paul Lennon
Clayton Shurdho

Hyatt (Farberman, Cameron) – 9:10	1–0
Kehl (Farberman, Peterson) – 28:57	2–0
	2–1	29:54 – Valentini (McKiernan)

4 min
Penalties
2 min
28
Shots
37

March 1, 2026; 7:00 PM	Post	2–4 (0–3, 1–0, 1–1)	Assumption	Worcester Ice Center, Worcester, Massachusetts; Attendance: 231

Hannah Saunders
Goalies
Jadyn Weiser
Referees:
Sarah Delaney
John Kanaris
Linesmen:
Paul Lennon
Clayton Shurdho

	0–1	Lilley (McGaffigan) – 6:58
	0–2	Joiner (Whitesell, Cielo) – 14:20
	0–3	McGaffigan (Valentini, Joiner) – pp – 17:15
Kehl (Currie, Mickevicius) – pp – 28:17	1–3
Currie – 58:00	2–3
	2–4	Hanrahan – en – 59:57.4

8 min
Penalties
4 min
37
Shots
33

==== (6) Sacred Heart at (3) Saint Anselm ====
February 27, 2026; 7:00 PM	Sacred Heart	2–3 (0–1, 1–0, 1–2)	Saint Anselm	Sullivan Arena, Manchester, New Hampshire; Attendance: 212

Jillian Petruno
Goalies
Kayla Czukoski
Referees:
Michael Godeanu
Nicholas Gauvin
Linesmen:
Cam Levasseur
Jason Bisbing

	0–1	17:57 – Dogan (DeCoteau, Buckley)
Carroll – 32:44	1–1
Limke (Bennetts, Smith) – 42:21	2–1
	2–2	44:01 – Schneiderhan (Dogan, DeCoteau)
	2–3	48:21 – Young (Stirling, Littler)

10 min
Penalties
8 min
27
Shots
35

February 28, 2026; 7:00 PM	Sacred Heart	1–3 (0–1, 1–2, 0–0)	Saint Anselm	Sullivan Arena, Manchester, New Hampshire; Attendance: 143

Jillian Petruno
Goalies
Kayla Czukoski
Referees:
Michael Godeanu
Nicholas Gauvin
Linesmen:
Jason Bisbing
Theresa Thompson

	0–1	11:55 – pp – Macaulay (Young, Tullo)
	0–2	29:21 – Tullo (Ondy, Moss)
Bennetts (Bowlby) – 29:21	1–2
	1–3	32:05 – Moss (Ondy, Tullo)

10 min
Penalties
12 min
33
Shots
34

==== (5) LIU at (4) Stonehill ====
February 27, 2026; 5:00 PM	LIU	0–3 (0–1, 0–1, 0–1)	Stonehill	Bridgewater Ice Arena, Bridgewater, Massachusetts; Attendance: 273

Victoria Rutnik
Goalies
Eve Stone
Referees:
Joshua Berenson
Ryan Whittemore
Linesmen:
Connor Cowan
Patrick Schubert

0–1	13:21 – Combe (Sacca, Squires)
0–2	23:03 – Sacca (Wise, Achtyl)
0–3	47:48 – Geist (Feeney, Kenmore)

4 min
Penalties
8 min
38
Shots
30

February 28, 2026; 1:00 PM	LIU	3–4 OT (1–3, 2–0, 0–0) (OT: 0–1)	Stonehill	Bridgewater Ice Arena, Bridgewater, Massachusetts; Attendance: 210

Victoria Rutnik
Clara Kammholz
Goalies
Eve Stone
Referees:
Joshua Berenson
Ryan Whittemore
Linesmen:
Connor Cowan
Patrick Schubert

	0–1	1:21 – Barrett (Feeney, Geist)
	0–2	2:30 – Russell (Mullin, Turcotte)
	0–3	11:14 – Combe (Palsa, Barrett)
Latka (Kiggen, Quackenbush) – 13:01	1–3
Mörtl (Schröfl, Butera) – 28:51	2–3
Babington (Wildfong) – 31:30	3–3
	3–4	67:19 – Spadone (Combe, Slocum)

2 min
Penalties
8 min
38
Shots
36

=== Semifinals ===
==== (4) Stonehill at (1) Franklin Pierce ====
March 4, 2026; 7:00 PM	Stonehill	1–2 2OT (0–0, 0–0, 1–1) (OT: 0–0, 0–1)	Franklin Pierce	Jason Ritchie Ice Arena, Winchendon, Massachusetts; Attendance: 302

Eve Stone
Goalies
Jill Hertl
Referees:
John Kanaris
Tom Reed
Linesmen:
Clayton Shurdho
Patrick Liddy

Spadone (Feeney, Kenmore) – 52:20	1–0
	1–1	57:17 – pp – Anderson (Murphy, Wright)
	1–2	85:52 – pp – Broz (Targosz, Korneta)

8 min
Penalties
4 min
41
Shots
65

==== (3) Saint Anselm at (2) Assumption ====
March 4, 2026; 3:00 PM	Saint Anselm	2–1 (1–0, 0–1 1–0)	Assumption	Worcester Ice Center, Worcester, Massachusetts; Attendance: 281

Kayla Czukoski
Goalies
Jadyn Weiser
Referees:
Sarah Delaney
James Troup
Linesmen:
Paul Lennon
Connor Cowan

Schneiderhan – 9:10	1–0
	1–1	26:34 – pp – A. McGaffigan (Lilley, K. McGaffigan)
Schneiderhan (DeCoteau, Dogan) – 40:27	2–1

4 min
Penalties
4 min
40
Shots
45

=== Championship ===
==== (3) Saint Anselm at (1) Franklin Pierce ====
March 7, 2026; 7:00 PM	Saint Anselm	0–2 (0–1, 0–0, 0–1)	Franklin Pierce	Jason Ritchie Ice Arena, Winchendon, Massachusetts; Attendance: 327

Kayla Czukoski	Goalies	Jill Hertl	Referees: James Troup; Sarah Delaney; Linesmen: Patrick Shubert; Clayton Shurdho
0–1 / 3:50 – pp – Dean (Anderson, Murphy,); 0–2 / 57:12 – Broz (Murphy, Korneta)			Referees: James Troup; Sarah Delaney; Linesmen: Patrick Shubert; Clayton Shurdho
6 min	Penalties	8 min	Referees: James Troup; Sarah Delaney; Linesmen: Patrick Shubert; Clayton Shurdho
41	Shots	37	Referees: James Troup; Sarah Delaney; Linesmen: Patrick Shubert; Clayton Shurdho

== Tournament Awards ==
=== All-Tournament Team ===
- F: Abigail Broz (Franklin Pierce)
- F: Caleigh Murphy (Franklin Pierce)
- F: Brooklyn Schneiderhan (Saint Anselm)
- D: Maggie Korneta (Franklin Pierce)
- D: Cora Webber (Saint Anselm)
- G: Jill Hertl* (Franklin Pierce)

* Most Outstanding Player
