= 2025–26 NCAA Division I women's ice hockey season =

2025–26 NCAA women's ice hockey season
- NCAA tournament: 2026
- National championship: Pegula Ice Arena; College Township, Pennsylvania
- NCAA champion: Wisconsin
- Patty Kazmaier Award: Caroline Harvey (Wisconsin)

The 2025–26 NCAA Division I women's ice hockey season began in September 2025 and ended with the 2026 NCAA Division I women's ice hockey tournament's championship game at Pegula Ice Arena in College Township, Pennsylvania on March 22, 2026.

== Regular season ==
=== New teams ===
The Delaware Blue Hens became the 45th NCAA Division I women's ice hockey this season. They played their first match against Long Island University on September 26. They joined Atlantic Hockey America, becoming the league's seventh active member.

=== Records ===
On November 30, 2025, the Wisconsin Badgers won the Smashville Women's Collegiate Hockey Showcase in Nashville, Tennessee. Defeating the Stonehill Skyhawks by a 17–2 score. Of note, the 17 goals, scored by 11 different skaters, represents a Badgers single game record.

=== Standings ===
- 2025–26 Atlantic Hockey America standings
  | | Conference | | | | | | | Overall | | | | | |
  | | GP | W | L | T | PTS | GF | GA | GP | W | L | T | GF | GA |
  |---|---|---|---|---|---|---|---|---|---|---|---|---|---|
  | #3 Penn State †* | 24 | 22 | 2 | 0 | 68 | 117 | 27 | 39 | 33 | 6 | 0 | 165 | 54 |
  | #12 Mercyhurst | 24 | 17 | 5 | 2 | 49 | 85 | 42 | 37 | 23 | 11 | 3 | 117 | 73 |
  | RIT | 24 | 11 | 13 | 0 | 34 | 71 | 67 | 34 | 16 | 18 | 0 | 100 | 88 |
  | Lindenwood | 24 | 11 | 12 | 1 | 35 | 67 | 78 | 37 | 14 | 21 | 2 | 95 | 119 |
  | Syracuse | 24 | 10 | 11 | 3 | 33 | 44 | 66 | 37 | 15 | 18 | 4 | 69 | 106 |
  | Robert Morris | 24 | 8 | 14 | 2 | 28 | 52 | 73 | 36 | 13 | 21 | 2 | 82 | 102 |
  | Delaware | 24 | 1 | 23 | 0 | 5 | 24 | 107 | 33 | 2 | 31 | 0 | 35 | 141 |
  Championship: March 7, 2026 † indicates conference regular season champion; * indicates conference tournament champion Rankings: USCHO.com; updated March 20, 2026
- 2025–26 ECAC Hockey standings
  | | Conference | | | | | | | Overall | | | | | |
  | | GP | W | L | T | PTS | GF | GA | GP | W | L | T | GF | GA |
  |---|---|---|---|---|---|---|---|---|---|---|---|---|---|
  | #8 Yale † | 22 | 16 | 6 | 0 | 46 | 78 | 49 | 36 | 26 | 10 | 0 | 126 | 76 |
  | #9 Princeton † | 22 | 16 | 6 | 0 | 46 | 68 | 37 | 34 | 23 | 11 | 0 | 106 | 57 |
  | #7 Quinnipiac * | 22 | 14 | 6 | 2 | 45 | 69 | 30 | 41 | 29 | 9 | 3 | 137 | 68 |
  | #11 Cornell | 22 | 14 | 7 | 1 | 42.5 | 70 | 42 | 33 | 20 | 11 | 2 | 101 | 67 |
  | #14 Clarkson | 22 | 13 | 7 | 2 | 40 | 69 | 50 | 35 | 20 | 12 | 3 | 210 | 75 |
  | #15 Colgate | 22 | 13 | 8 | 1 | 39.5 | 65 | 57 | 36 | 19 | 16 | 1 | 103 | 100 |
  | Brown | 22 | 12 | 8 | 2 | 39 | 62 | 50 | 34 | 18 | 14 | 2 | 93 | 82 |
  | Harvard | 22 | 8 | 11 | 3 | 28.5 | 38 | 50 | 34 | 16 | 15 | 3 | 70 | 72 |
  | St. Lawrence | 22 | 8 | 13 | 1 | 27.5 | 44 | 57 | 35 | 11 | 21 | 3 | 65 | 88 |
  | Dartmouth | 22 | 3 | 16 | 3 | 16.5 | 19 | 61 | 31 | 5 | 23 | 3 | 40 | 88 |
  | RPI | 22 | 4 | 18 | 0 | 14 | 40 | 96 | 35 | 7 | 28 | 0 | 60 | 134 |
  | Union | 22 | 3 | 18 | 1 | 11.5 | 40 | 83 | 36 | 11 | 22 | 3 | 79 | 114 |
  Championship: March 7, 2026 † indicates conference regular season champion; * indicates conference tournament champion Rankings: USCHO.com; updated March 23, 2026
- 2025–26 Hockey East standings
  | | Conference | | | | | | | Overall | | | | | |
  | | GP | W | L | T | PTS | GF | GA | GP | W | L | T | GF | GA |
  |---|---|---|---|---|---|---|---|---|---|---|---|---|---|
  | #4 Northeastern † | 24 | 21 | 2 | 1 | 65 | 80 | 34 | 39 | 29 | 9 | 1 | 115 | 71 |
  | #6 UConn * | 24 | 17 | 6 | 1 | 54 | 76 | 40 | 39 | 28 | 9 | 2 | 117 | 64 |
  | Boston College | 24 | 14 | 9 | 1 | 42 | 72 | 56 | 35 | 16 | 18 | 1 | 88 | 99 |
  | Holy Cross | 24 | 10 | 11 | 3 | 37 | 49 | 46 | 35 | 19 | 13 | 3 | 83 | 65 |
  | New Hampshire | 24 | 10 | 12 | 2 | 33 | 66 | 68 | 35 | 16 | 16 | 3 | 99 | 87 |
  | Vermont | 24 | 9 | 11 | 4 | 32 | 55 | 58 | 38 | 16 | 17 | 5 | 82 | 93 |
  | Maine | 24 | 8 | 12 | 4 | 30 | 46 | 54 | 36 | 13 | 19 | 4 | 71 | 93 |
  | Boston University | 24 | 8 | 14 | 2 | 28 | 45 | 61 | 35 | 11 | 21 | 3 | 64 | 89 |
  | Providence | 24 | 8 | 14 | 2 | 25 | 45 | 72 | 35 | 11 | 22 | 2 | 63 | 112 |
  | Merrimack | 24 | 4 | 18 | 2 | 15 | 36 | 80 | 35 | 7 | 24 | 4 | 61 | 113 |
  Championship: March 7, 2026 † indicates conference regular season champion; * indicates conference tournament champion Rankings: USCHO.com; updated March 23, 2026
- 2025–26 NEWHA standings
  | | Conference | | | | | | | Overall | | | | | |
  | | GP | W | L | T | PTS | GF | GA | GP | W | L | T | GF | GA |
  |---|---|---|---|---|---|---|---|---|---|---|---|---|---|
  | Franklin Pierce †* | 28 | 18 | 8 | 2 | 57 | 83 | 55 | 37 | 23 | 12 | 2 | 103 | 66 |
  | Assumption | 28 | 17 | 8 | 3 | 55 | 89 | 48 | 38 | 19 | 16 | 3 | 105 | 83 |
  | Saint Anselm | 28 | 16 | 11 | 1 | 52 | 92 | 67 | 38 | 19 | 18 | 1 | 109 | 96 |
  | Stonehill | 28 | 16 | 10 | 2 | 49 | 81 | 63 | 37 | 18 | 17 | 2 | 97 | 120 |
  | LIU | 28 | 16 | 11 | 1 | 47 | 62 | 59 | 36 | 18 | 17 | 1 | 75 | 90 |
  | Sacred Heart | 28 | 12 | 14 | 2 | 39 | 69 | 63 | 36 | 13 | 21 | 2 | 77 | 99 |
  | Post | 28 | 10 | 17 | 1 | 33 | 51 | 71 | 37 | 11 | 25 | 1 | 58 | 108 |
  | Saint Michael's | 28 | 1 | 27 | 0 | 4 | 25 | 162 | 34 | 1 | 33 | 0 | 26 | 179 |
  Championship: March 7, 2026 † indicates conference regular season champion; * indicates conference tournament champion Rankings: USCHO.com; updated March 20, 2026
- 2025–26 Western Collegiate Hockey Association standings
  | | Conference | | | | | | | | | | Overall | | | | | |
  | | GP | W | L | T | OTW | OTL | SOW | PTS | GF | GA | GP | W | L | T | GF | GA |
  |---|---|---|---|---|---|---|---|---|---|---|---|---|---|---|---|---|
  | #1 Wisconsin † | 28 | 23 | 3 | 2 | 1 | 1 | 1 | 72 | 138 | 45 | 41 | 35 | 4 | 2 | 213 | 60 |
  | #2 Ohio State * | 28 | 24 | 4 | 0 | 2 | 0 | 0 | 70 | 117 | 50 | 41 | 36 | 5 | 0 | 181 | 66 |
  | #5 Minnesota | 28 | 18 | 9 | 1 | 1 | 2 | 1 | 57 | 115 | 70 | 39 | 26 | 12 | 1 | 173 | 86 |
  | #10 Minnesota Duluth | 28 | 15 | 10 | 3 | 2 | 0 | 2 | 48 | 69 | 59 | 38 | 20 | 15 | 3 | 93 | 76 |
  | #13 Minnesota State | 28 | 9 | 17 | 2 | 2 | 1 | 1 | 29 | 55 | 95 | 38 | 17 | 19 | 2 | 86 | 113 |
  | St. Cloud State | 28 | 7 | 19 | 2 | 1 | 4 | 1 | 27 | 74 | 103 | 37 | 12 | 23 | 2 | 83 | 120 |
  | St. Thomas | 28 | 7 | 20 | 1 | 3 | 5 | 0 | 24 | 49 | 95 | 36 | 12 | 23 | 1 | 81 | 117 |
  | Bemidji State | 28 | 3 | 24 | 1 | 1 | 0 | 0 | 9 | 38 | 138 | 36 | 6 | 27 | 3 | 58 | 161 |
  Championship: March 7, 2026 † indicates conference regular season champion; * indicates conference tournament champion Rankings: USCHO.com; updated March 23, 2026

== Player stats ==
=== Scoring leaders ===
The following players lead the NCAA in points at the conclusion of games played on March 8, 2026

Note: GP = Games played; G = Goals; A = Assists; Pts = Points; PIM = Penalty minutes;

| Player | Pos | Class | Team | GP | G | A | Pts | PIM |
|---|---|---|---|---|---|---|---|---|
| Lacey Eden | F | Graduate Student | Wisconsin | 38 | 28 | 45 | 73 | 4 |
| Abbey Murphy | F | Graduate Student | Minnesota | 30 | 38 | 26 | 64 | 67 |
| Kahlen Lamarche | F | Junior | Quinnipiac | 39 | 42 | 19 | 61 | 26 |
| Caroline Harvey | D | Senior | Wisconsin | 30 | 18 | 43 | 61 | 10 |
| Kirsten Simms | F | Senior | Wisconsin | 28 | 24 | 30 | 54 | 16 |
| Sara Manness | F | Freshman | Clarkson | 35 | 21 | 31 | 52 | 10 |
| Hilda Svensson | F | Freshman | Ohio State | 30 | 18 | 32 | 50 | 2 |
| Jordan Raye | F | Senior | Yale | 34 | 17 | 31 | 49 | 4 |
| Brooklyn Schneiderhan | F | Senior | Saint Anselm | 38 | 25 | 23 | 48 | 21 |
| Carina DiAntonio | F | Senior | Yale | 34 | 26 | 22 | 48 | 12 |

=== Leading goaltenders ===
The following goaltenders lead the NCAA in goals against average at the conclusion of games played on March 8, 2026, minimum 1/3 of team's minutes played.

Note: Pos = Position;GP = Games played; Min, TOI = Minutes played; W = Wins; L = Losses; T,T/OT = Ties; OTL = Overtime losses; GA = Goals-against; GAA = Goals-against average; SO = Shutouts; SA = Shots against; SV = Shots saved; SV% = Save percentage;

| Player | Class | Team | GP | Min | W | L | T | GA | SO | SV% | GAA |
|---|---|---|---|---|---|---|---|---|---|---|---|
| Ava McNaughton | Junior | Wisconsin | 29 | 1,684 | 25 | 2 | 2 | 37 | 7 | .939 | 1.32 |
| Katie DeSa | Senior | Penn State | 29 | 1,682 | 26 | 3 | 0 | 37 | 11 | .935 | 1.32 |
| Samson Frey | Freshman | Yale | 17 | 982 | 15 | 2 | 0 | 24 | 5 | .937 | 1.47 |
| Hailey MacLeod | Senior | Ohio State | 27 | 1,561 | 24 | 3 | 0 | 39 | 5 | .930 | 1.50 |
| Felicia Frank | Sophomore | Quinnipiac | 39 | 2,340 | 28 | 8 | 3 | 59 | 9 | .942 | 1.51 |

== Awards ==
=== HCA Monthly Honors ===
| Month | Award | Recipient |
|---|---|---|
| September/October | Forward of the Month | Abbey Murphy, Minnesota |
| September/October | Forward of the Month | Kahlen Lamarche, Quinnipiac |
| September/October | Defender of the Month | Caroline Harvey, Wisconsin |
| September/October | Goaltender of the Month | Hannah Clark, Minnesota |
| September/October | Rookie of the Month | Sara Manness, Clarkson |
| September/October | Rookie of the Month | Hilda Svensson, Ohio State |
| November | Forward of the Month | Joy Dunne, Ohio State |
| November | Defender of the Month | Caroline Harvey, Wisconsin |
| November | Goaltender of the Month | Grace Campbell, Boston College |
| November | Goaltender of the Month | Uma Corniea, Princeton |
| November | Goaltender of the Month | Kayla Czukoski, Saint Anselm |
| November | Rookie of the Month | Hilda Svensson, Ohio State |
| December | Forward of the Month | Mackenzie Alexander, Princeton |
| December | Defender of the Month | Caroline Harvey, Wisconsin |
| December | Goaltender of the Month | Maggie Hatch, Robert Morris |
| December | Goaltender of the Month | Ava McNaughton, Wisconsin |
| December | Rookie of the Month | Nina Rossi, New Hampshire |
| January | Forward of the Month | Abbey Murphy, Minnesota |
| January | Defender of the Month | Kate Manness, Clarkson |
| January | Goaltender of the Month | Samson Frey, Yale |
| January | Goaltender of the Month | Hailey MacLeod, Ohio State |
| January | Rookie of the Month | Sara Manness, Clarkson |
| February | Forward of the Month | Lacey Eden, Wisconsin |
| February | Forward of the Month | Kahlen Lamarche, Quinnipiac |
| February | Defender of the Month | Emma Peschel, Ohio State |
| February | Goaltender of the Month | Ève Gascon, Minnesota Duluth |
| February | Goaltender of the Month | Annelies Bergmann, Cornell |
| February | Goaltender of the Month | Lisa Jönsson, Northeastern |
| February | Rookie of the Month | Ava Thomas, Boston College |
| February | Rookie of the Month | Tilli Keranan, RIT |

=== WCHA ===
==== Individual awards ====
WCHA Individual Awards
| Award | Recipient |
|---|---|
| Player of the Year | Caroline Harvey |
| Forward of the Year | Abbey Murphy |
| Defender of the Year | Caroline Harvey |
| Rookie of the Year | Hilda Svensson |
| Goaltender of the Year | Ève Gascon |
| Outstanding Student-Athlete of the Year | Mary Kate O'Brien |
| Scoring Champion | Lacey Eden |
| Goaltending Champion | Ève Gascon |
| Coach of the Year | Mark Johnson |

==== All-WCHA teams ====
All-WCHA Conference Teams
| Team | Position | Player | Collegiate Team |
|---|---|---|---|
| First Team | F | Abbey Murphy | Minnesota |
| First Team | F | Joy Dunne | Ohio State |
| First Team | F | Lacey Eden | Wisconsin |
| First Team | D | Emma Peschel | Ohio State |
| First Team | D | Caroline Harvey | Wisconsin |
| First Team | G | Ève Gascon | Minnesota Duluth |
| Second Team | F | Jocelyn Amos | Ohio State |
| Second Team | F | Laila Edwards | Wisconsin |
| Second Team | F | Kirsten Simms | Wisconsin |
| Second Team | D | Sydney Morrow | Minnesota |
| Second Team | D | Nelli Laitinen | Minnesota |
| Second Team | G | Ava McNaughton | Wisconsin |
| Third Team | F | Caitlin Kraemer | Minnesota Duluth |
| Third Team | F | Hilda Svensson | Ohio State |
| Third Team | F | Cassie Hall | Wisconsin |
| Third Team | D | Mira Jungåker | Ohio State |
| Third Team | D | Vivian Jungels | Wisconsin |
| Third Team | G | Hailey MacLeod | Ohio State |
| Rookie Team | F | Bella Fanale | Minnesota |
| Rookie Team | F | Mercury Bischoff | Minnesota State |
| Rookie Team | F | Hilda Svensson | Ohio State |
| Rookie Team | D | Jenna Raunio | Ohio State |
| Rookie Team | D | Sydney Lamb | St. Cloud State |
| Rookie Team | G | Taylor Kressin | Ohio State |

=== AHA ===
==== Individual awards ====
AHA Individual Awards
| Award | Recipient |
|---|---|
| Player of the Year | Tessa Janecke |
| Rookie of the Year | Danica Maynard |
| Forward of the Year | Tessa Janecke |
| Defender of the Year | Kendall Butze |
| Goalie of the Year | Katie DeSa |
| Goaltending Champion | Katie DeSa |
| Defensive Forward of the Year | Jessica MacKinnon |
| Scoring Champion | Grace Outwater |
| Sportsmanship Award | Delaware |
| Sportsmanship Award | Mercyhurst |
| Scholar Athlete of the Year | Molly Henderson |
| Coach of the Year | Jeff Kampersal |

==== All-AHA teams ====
All-AHA Conference Teams
| Team | Position | Player | Collegiate Team |
|---|---|---|---|
| First Team | F | Tessa Janecke | Penn State |
| First Team | F | Grace Outwater | Penn State |
| First Team | F | Jessica MacKinnon | Robert Morris |
| First Team | D | Kendall Butze | Penn State |
| First Team | D | Emma Pickering | RIT |
| First Team | G | Katie DeSa | Penn State |
| Second Team | F | Julia Perjus | Mercyhurst |
| Second Team | F | Katelyn Roberts | Penn State |
| Second Team | F | Maddy Christian | Penn State |
| Second Team | D | Danica Maynard | Penn State |
| Second Team | D | Payten Evans | Mercyhurst |
| Second Team | G | Magdalena Luggin | Mercyhurst |
| Rookie Team | F | Julia Perjus | Mercyhurst |
| Rookie Team | F | Linnea Misner | Lindenwood |
| Rookie Team | F | Mikah Keller | Penn State |
| Rookie Team | D | Danica Maynard | Penn State |
| Rookie Team | D | Linnea Misner | Robert Morris |
| Rookie Team | D | Ava Drabyk | Syracuse |

=== NEWHA ===
==== Individual awards ====
NEWHA Individual Awards
| Award | Recipient |
|---|---|
| Player of the Year | Brooklyn Schneiderhan |
| Rookie of the Year | Addison Andre |
| Defender of the Year | Justina Valentini |
| Goalie of the Year | Jill Hertl |
| Coach of the Year | David Stockdale |

==== All-NEWHA teams ====
All-NEWHA Conference Teams
| Team | Position | Player | Collegiate Team |
|---|---|---|---|
| First Team | F | Brooklyn Schneiderhan | Saint Anselm |
| First Team | F | Kayla McGaffigan | Assumption |
| First Team | F | Grace Babington | LIU |
| First Team | D | Justina Valentini | Assumption |
| First Team | D | Maggie Korneta | Franklin Pierce |
| First Team | G | Jill Hertl | Franklin Pierce |
| Second Team | F | Caleigh Murphy | Franklin Pierce |
| Second Team | F | Ava McGaffigan | Assumption |
| Second Team | F | Maddi Achtyl | Stonehill |
| Second Team | D | Reagan Whynot | Stonehill |
| Second Team | D | Addison Robillard | LIU |
| Second Team | G | Hannah Saunders | Post |
| Rookie Team | F | Addison Andre | Franklin Pierce |
| Rookie Team | F | Natalie Joiner | Assumption |
| Rookie Team | F | Summer Combe | Stonehill |
| Rookie Team | F | Melanie Targosz | Franklin Pierce |
| Rookie Team | D | Addison Robillard | LIU |
| Rookie Team | G | Kayla Czukoski | Saint Anselm |
| Sportswomanship Team | F | Ryane Kearns | LIU |
| Sportswomanship Team | F | Maddy Noonan | Post |
| Sportswomanship Team | F | Ella Dahl | Sacred Heart |
| Sportswomanship Team | F | Sydney Merritt | Saint Anselm |
| Sportswomanship Team | F | Elisabeth Gerebi | Saint Michael's |
| Sportswomanship Team | F | Makenna Slocum | Stonehill |
| Sportswomanship Team | D | Annabel Ziskin | Assumption |
| Sportswomanship Team | D | Ashley Wright | Franklin Pierce |

=== WHEA ===
==== Individual awards ====
| Award | Recipient |
|---|---|
| Cami Granato Award (Player of the Year) | Stryker Zablocki |
| Pro Ambitions Rookie of the Year | Ava Thomas |
| Pro Ambitions Rookie of the Year | Stryker Zablocki |
| Hockey East Coach of the Year | Katie Lachapelle |
| Best Defensive Forward | Emma Conner |
| Best Defenseman | Jules Constantinople |
| Goaltender of the Year | Tia Chan |
| Sportmanship Award | Anna Podein |
| Army ROTC Three Stars Award | Grace Campbell |
| Scoring Champion | Stryker Zablocki |

==== All-WHEA teams ====
Women's Hockey East All-Star Teams
| Team | Position | Player | Collegiate Team |
|---|---|---|---|
| First Team | F | Lily Shannon | Northeastern |
| First Team | F | Ava Thomas | Boston College |
| First Team | F | Stryker Zablocki | Northeastern |
| First Team | D | Jules Constantinople | Northeastern |
| First Team | D | Madelyn Murphy | Boston College |
| First Team | G | Tia Chan | Connecticut |
| Second Team | F | Claire Murdoch | Connecticut |
| Second Team | F | Julia Pellerin | Connecticut |
| Second Team | F | Nina Rossi | New Hampshire |
| Second Team | D | Kristina Allard | Northeastern |
| Second Team | D | Maya Serdachny | Connecticut |
| Second Team | G | Lisa Jönsson | Northeastern |
| Third Team | F | Morgan Jackson | Northeastern |
| Third Team | F | Kyla Josifovic | Connecticut |
| Third Team | F | Stella Retrum | Vermont |
| Third Team | D | Josie Hemp | Vermont |
| Third Team | D | Olivia Maffeo | Boston College |
| Third Team | G | Abby Hornung | Holy Cross |
| Rookie Team | F | Violet Carroll | Holy Cross |
| Rookie Team | F | Nina Rossi | New Hampshire |
| Rookie Team | F | Ava Thomas | Boston College |
| Rookie Team | F | Maxim Tremblay | Boston College |
| Rookie Team | F | Stryker Zablocki | Northeastern |
| Rookie Team | D | Madelyn Murphy | Boston College |

=== ECAC ===
==== Individual awards ====
ECAC Individual Awards
| Award | Recipient |
|---|---|
| Player of the Year | Sara Manness |
| Forward of the Year | Sara Manness |
| Defender of the Year | Molly Boyle |
| Rookie of the Year | Sara Manness |
| Goaltender of the Year | Felicia Frank |
| Mandi Schwartz Student-Athlete of the Year | |
| Coach of the Year | Mark Bolding |

==== All-ECAC teams ====
All-ECAC Conference Teams
| Team | Position | Player | Collegiate Team |
|---|---|---|---|
| First Team | F | Issy Wunder | Princeton |
| First Team | F | Sara Manness | Clarkson |
| First Team | F | Kahlen Lamarche | Quinnipiac |
| First Team | D | Kate Manness | Clarkson |
| First Team | D | Molly Boyle | Yale |
| First Team | G | Felicia Frank | Quinnipiac |
| Second Team | F | Jordan Ray | Yale |
| Second Team | F | Carina DiAntonio | Yale |
| Second Team | F | Mackenzie Alexander | Princeton |
| Second Team | D | Piper Grober | Cornell |
| Second Team | D | Makayla Watson | Quinnipiac |
| Second Team | G | Uma Corniea | Princeton |
| Third Team | F | Sena Catterall | Clarkson |
| Third Team | F | Jade Iginla | Brown |
| Third Team | F | Elyssa Biederman | Colgate |
| Third Team | D | Grace Dwyer | Cornell |
| Third Team | D | Gracie Gilkyson | Yale |
| Third Team | G | Annelies Bergmann | Cornell |
| Rookie Team | F | Brooke Mulvihill | St. Lawrence |
| Rookie Team | F | Morgan McGathey | Harvard |
| Rookie Team | F | Sara Manness | Clarkson |
| Rookie Team | D | Kate Manness | Clarkson |
| Rookie Team | D | Molly Boyle | Yale |
| Rookie Team | G | Samson Frey | Yale |

=== Individual awards ===
==== Table key ====
Key of colors and symbols
| Color/symbol | Explanation |
|---|---|
| † | Winner |

==== Patty Kazmaier Award ====
Patty Kazmaier Award Finalists
| Player | Position | School |
|---|---|---|
| Caroline Harvey | Defense | Wisconsin Top Three |
| Tessa Janecke | Forward | Penn State Top Three |
| Abbey Murphy | Forward | Minnesota Top Three |
| Tia Chan | Goaltender | Connecticut |
| Joy Dunne | Forward | Ohio State |
| Lacey Eden | Forward | Wisconsin |
| Laila Edwards | Forward | Wisconsin |
| Kahlen Lamarche | Forward | Quinnipiac |
| Kirsten Simms | Forward | Wisconsin |
| Issy Wunder | Forward | Princeton |

==== AHCA Coach of the Year ====
AHCA Coach of the Year Finalists
| Coach | School |
|---|---|
| Jeff Kampersal† | Penn State |
| Mark Bolding | Yale |
| Dave Flint | Northeastern |
| Brad Frost | Minnesota |
| Mark Johnson | Wisconsin |
| Katie Lachapelle | Holy Cross |
| Nadine Muzerall | Ohio State |
| David Stockdale | Franklin Pierce |

==== Goalie of the Year ====
Goalie of the Year Finalists
| Player | School |
|---|---|
| Tia Chan† | Connecticut |
| Felicia Frank | Quinnipiac |
| Ève Gascon | Minnesota Duluth |

==== Julie Chu Rookie of the Year Award ====
Julie Chu Rookie of the Year Award Finalists
| Player | Position | School |
|---|---|---|
| Sara Manness† | Forward | Clarkson |
| Hilda Svensson† | Forward | Ohio State |

== See also ==
- 2025–26 NCAA Division I men's ice hockey season
