= 2026 Atlantic Hockey America Women's Ice Hockey Tournament =

2026 AHA Women's ice hockey tournament
- Tournament logo
- Dates: February 19 – March 7, 2026
- Teams: 7
- Finals site: Pegula Ice Arena; University Park, Pennsylvania
- Champions: Penn State Nittany Lions (2nd title)
- Winning coach: Jeff Kampersal (2nd title)
- MVP: Tessa Janecke (Penn State)
- AHA Women's Ice Hockey Tournaments

The 2026 Atlantic Hockey America Tournament was the 2nd edition of the AHA Tournament. It was played between February 19 and March 7, 2026. Penn State enters the tournament as the defending champions.

The Penn State Nittany Lions defended their championship by defeating the Mercyhurst Lakers by a score of 3–2. Penn State earned the conferences automatic bid to the 2026 NCAA Division I women's ice hockey tournament.

== Format ==
The tournament includes all seven teams in the conference. Teams were ranked according to their finish in the conference standings. As the two lowest seeds from the regular season, Delaware and Robert Morris will play a single-elimination game in the first round, with the winner advancing to the quarterfinals. The game will be played on Lindenwood's campus, with Lindenwood playing and hosting the winner of the first-round game. The second quarterfinal game will be a five-four matchup. Both quarterfinal games are single elimination. The two highest seeds receive a bye into the semifinals and will host a best-of-three series with the winners from the quarterfinals. As Penn State finished as the regular-season champions, they will host the lowest remaining seed in the semifinals. The championship takes place on March 7, 2026, at the site of the higher seed from the two quarterfinal games. The tournament champion will receive an automatic bid into the 2026 NCAA Division I women's ice hockey tournament.

== Standings ==
2025–26 Atlantic Hockey America standings
	Conference							Overall					
	GP	W	L	T	PTS	GF	GA	GP	W	L	T	GF	GA
#3 Penn State†*	24	22	2	0	68	117	27	34	29	5	0	147	47
#12 Mercyhurst	24	17	5	2	49	85	42	34	21	10	3	101	65
Lindenwood	24	11	12	1	35	67	78	34	13	19	2	89	113
RIT	24	11	13	0	34	71	67	33	16	17	0	97	84
Syracuse	24	10	11	3	33	44	66	34	14	16	4	64	94
Robert Morris	24	8	14	2	28	52	73	32	12	20	2	78	97
Delaware	24	1	23	0	5	24	107	32	2	30	0	33	138
Championship: March 7, 2026 † indicates conference regular season champion; * indicates conference tournament champion Rankings: USCHO.com; updated March 2, 2026; Source: AHA

== Bracket ==
First Round; February 19
7	Delaware	2
6	Robert Morris	3*

Quarterfinals; February 21
6	Robert Morris	1
3	Lindenwood	3
5	Syracuse	4**
4	RIT	3

Semifinals; February 27 - March 1
3	Lindenwood	1	2	—
2	Mercyhurst	2	3**	—
5	Syracuse	0	1	—
1	Penn State	7	2	—

Championship; March 7
2	Mercyhurst	2
1	Penn State	3

Note: each * denotes one overtime period

== Results ==
=== First Round ===
==== (7) Delaware vs. (6) Robert Morris ====
February 19, 2026; 2:00 PM	Delaware	2-3 (1–0, 1–1, 0–1); OT: (0–1)	Robert Morris	Centene Community Ice Center, St. Charles, Missouri; Attendance: 42

Charlotte Payne
Goalies
Maggie Hatch
Referees:
Christopher Binkley
Richard Palo
Linesmen:
Andy Zawada
Sean Fitzpatrick

Finnegan (Barresi, Smith) – pp - 2:18	1–0
Barresi (Finnegan, Borg) – 20:53	2–0
	2–1	32:33 – Giampietro (Giannone, Misner)
	2–2	52:15 – pp – Giannone (Desjardins, Schooley)
	2–3	66:12 – MacKinnon (Goding, Giampietro)

4 min
Penalties
4 min
21
Shots
50

=== Quarterfinals ===
==== (6) Robert Morris at (3) Lindenwood ====
February 21, 2026; 11:45 AM	Robert Morris	1-3 (0-0, 1-2, 0-1)	Lindenwood	Centene Community Ice Center, St. Charles, Missouri; Attendance: 101

Maggie Hatch
Goalies
Madison Botwell
Referees:
Christopher Binkley
Andrew Bethmann
Linesmen:
Andy Zawada
Sean Fitzpatrick

	0-1	23:12 – Pazmandi (Paulinyova)
Giannone (MacKinnon, Schooley) – 27:12	1-1
	1-2	35:38 – Gundersen (Henderson, Blichova)
	1-3	57:57 - en – Paulinyova (Blichova)

4 min
Penalties
21 min
32
Shots
2

==== (5) Syracuse at (4) RIT ====
February 21, 2026; 3:00 PM	Syracuse	4-3 (1-1, 1-0, 1-2); OT: (0–0, 1-0)	RIT	Gene Polisseni Center, Rochester, New York; Attendance: 713

Ava Drabyk
Goalies
Brenna McNamara
Referees:
Todd Plouffe
Aaron Alexin
Linesmen:
Seamus Andrew
Nichola Romano

Blouin (Armstrong) – 11:32	1-0
	1-1	16:17 – Keraenen (Buziak, Stein)
Armstrong (Blouin, Gendron) – 26:40	2-1
Armstrong (Gnade, Gendron) – 45:52	3-1
	3-2	48:36 – Ashe (Ziotas, Urbach)
	3-3	49:04 – Rulle (Kelley, Alvarez)
Gnade (Armstrong, Blouin) – 83:24	4-3

2 min
Penalties
2 min
30
Shots
31

=== Semifinals ===
==== (5) Syracuse at (1) Penn State ====
February 27, 2026; 6:00 PM	Syracuse	0–7 (0–2, 0–3, 0–3)	Penn State	Pegula Ice Arena, University Park, Pennsylvania; Attendance: 924

Ava Drabyk
Bella Gould
Goalies
Katie DeSa
Referees:
Christopher Binkley
Mackenzie Gaydosh
Linesmen:
Ashley Johnston
Seamus Andrew

0–1	13:29 – Janecke (Stonehouse, Maynard)
0–2	15:03 – Fantin
0–3	31:41 – Vaslet (Butze, Fantin)
0–4	37:16 – pp – Janecke (Stecker, Butze)
0–5	43:04 – pp – Janecke (Keller, Morrow)
0–6	48:14 – Hall (Fantin)
0–7	51:48 – Stonehouse

21 min
Penalties
8 min
16
Shots
36

February 28, 2026; 3:00 PM	Syracuse	1–2 (0–1, 1–1, 0–0)	Penn State	Pegula Ice Arena, University Park, Pennsylvania; Attendance: 862

Ava Drabyk
Goalies
Katie DeSa
Referees:
Christopher Binkley
Mackenzie Gaydosh
Linesmen:
Ashley Johnston
Seamus Andrew

	0–1	15:00 – Janecke (Roberts)
Kinsler (Costabile) – pp – 25:48	1–1
	1–2	38:49 – pp – Stonehouse (Outwater, Maynard)

10 min
Penalties
4 min
16
Shots
30

==== (3) Lindenwood at (2) Mercyhurst ====
February 27, 2026; 3:00 PM	Lindenwood	1–2 (1–1, 0–0, 0–1)	Mercyhurst	Mercyhurst Ice Center, Erie, Pennsylvania; Attendance: 689

Madison Botwell
Goalies
Magdalena Luggin
Referees:
Nate Shemo
Erica D'Errico
Linesmen:
Andy Zawada
Nicholas Romano

	0–1	3:22 - Perjus (McKinley)
Paulinyova (Pazmandi, Blichova) – 18:09	1–1
	1–2	54:29 – pp - Perjus (Alenius, Evans)

6 min
Penalties
4 min
23
Shots
36

February 28, 2026; 1:00 PM	Lindenwood	2–3 2OT (1–0, 1–1, 0–1); OT: (0–0, 0-1)	Mercyhurst	Mercyhurst Ice Center, Erie, Pennsylvania

Madison Bowtell
Goalies
Magdalena Luggin
Referees:
Nate Shemo
Erica D'Errico
Linesmen:
Andy Zawada
Nicholas Romano

Gundersen – 00:23	1–0
Gundersen (Dunne-Weeks) – 23:26	2–0
	2–1	26:38 – Alenius (Nuutinen, Metzler)
	2–2	53:43 – Poitras (Donegan)
	2–3	87:35 – Lolacher (Maisonneuve, VanNetten)

4 min
Penalties
8 min
28
Shots
43

=== Championship ===
==== (2) Mercyhurst at (1) Penn State ====
March 7, 2026; 2:00 PM	Mercyhurst	2–3 (0–1, 0–2, 2–0)	Penn State	Pegula Ice Arena, University Park, Pennsylvania; Attendance: 1,246

Magdalena Luggin
Goalies
Katie DeSa
Referees:
Christopher Binkley
Mackenzie Gaydosh
Linesmen:
Ashley Johnston
Andy Zawada

	0–1	10:40 – Vaslet (Fantin)
	0–2	32:24 – Hall (Morrow, Stecker)
	0–3	37:54 – pp – Roberts (Janecke)
Poitras – 43:45	1–3
Lolacher (Schalin) – 58:41	2–3

23 min
Penalties
19 min
31
Shots
33

Note: all times eastern

== Tournament Awards ==
=== All-Tournament Team ===
- F: Tessa Janecke* (Penn State)
- F: Matilde Fantin (Penn State)
- F: Peyton Armstrong (Syracuse)
- D: Kendall Butze (Penn State)
- D: Abby Poitras (Mercyhurst)
- G: Katie DeSa (Penn State)

* Most Outstanding Player
