= Assumption Greyhounds women's ice hockey =

- University: Assumption University (Worcester)
- Conference: NEWHA
- Head coach: Joe Groosman; 3rd season, 47–59–10 (.448)
- Assistant coaches: Delaney Couture; Kylian Kelly
- Captain(s): Kayla McGaffigan
- Alternate captain(s): Justina Valentini
- Arena: Worcester Ice Center; Worcester, Massachusetts
- Colors: Blue and white

The Assumption Greyhounds women's ice hockey team is a National Collegiate Athletic Association (NCAA) Division I college ice hockey program that represents Assumption University (Worcester). The Greyhounds, members of New England Women's Hockey Alliance, play at the Worcester Ice Center in Worcester, Massachusetts.

== History ==
Assumption joined the NEWHA for administrative purposes in 2022 in advance of its first season of varsity women's hockey in 2023–24.

The 2023-24 season saw the Greyhounds record 69 goals. Early in the season, Carissa Mudrak set a program record for most saves in one game, logging 53 on October 13, 2023 versus Saint Anselm.

The Greyhounds first game occurred on September 29, 2023. Facing off against the Rochester Institute of Technology Tigers, Sheridan Terrazzano scored the first goal in program history, with the assist credited to Caroline Lilley. Jenna Chaplain also scored in a 3-2 loss.

The Greyhounds first NEWHA game took place on Friday October 13, 2023, a 3-3 tie versus Saint Anselm. Eight days later, the Greyhounds won their first game. Defeating Post by a 5-4 overtime score, Emma Gurnell recorded the game winning goal. Mudrak earned the win in a 28 save performance.

On October 5, 2024, the Greyhounds gained their first out of conference victory. Besting the University of New Hampshire with a 2-1 shootout win. Goaltender Jadyyn Weiser recorded 54 saves.

In a November 2, 2024 game versus the Post Eagles, the Greyhounds recorded seven goals. At the time, a program record for most goals scored (since broken), thirteen different Greyhounds recorded at least one point in the 7-3 final.

During the 2025-26 season, multiple skaters reached 100 career games played. On January 31, 2026, Kayla and Ava McGaffigan, along with Alexa Hanrahan all reached 100 career games, becoming the first players in program history to do so. Lexie Kirkeby played in her 100th game on February 7, 2026 while Caroline Lilley achieved the feat on February 14.

On Senior Day 2026, the Greyhounds set two records. Kayla McGaffigan recorded the first hat trick in program history. Scoring nine goals versus the Saint Michael's Purple Knights, it represented a new record for most goals scored in one game. As a side note, senior goaltender Jadyn Weiser shared in the shutout with Maria Suarez, as the Greyhounds prevailed in a 9-0 final.

Opposing the Post Eagles in the first round of the 2026 NEWHA Playoffs, Assumption won the third and deciding game by a 4-2 margin. Led by goaltender Jadyn Weiser, who recorded 35 savrs, Natalie Joiner led all Assumption skaters with a goal and assist. With the win, Assumption advances to the NEWHA Semifinals for the first time.

=== Season-by-season results ===
| Won championship | Lost championship | Conference champions | League leader |

| Year | Coach | W | L | T | Finish | Conference Tournament | NCAA Tournament |
| 2025-26 | Joe Grossman | 17 | 14 | 3 | 2nd, NEWHA | Won First Round vs Post (2-1 OT, 1-2, 4-2), Semifinals vs Saint Anselm | |
| 2024-25 | Joe Grossman | 10 | 23 | 3 | 7th, NEWHA | Lost First Round vs Sacred Heart (0-1, 2-6) | |
| 2023-24 | Jack Sweeney | 10 | 22 | 4 | 6th, NEWHA | Lost First Round vs Stonehill (2-3, 1-3) | |

=== Team captains ===
- 2023-24: Sheridan Terrazzano C
- 2024-25: Sheridan Terrazzano C, Emma Gurnell A, Carissa Mudrak A
- 2025-26: Kayla McGaffigan C, Mary McKiernan A, Justina Valentini A

== Awards and Honors ==
- Justina Valentini, 2025-26 NEWHA Defensive Player of the Year

=== NEWHA All-Stars ===
- Kayla McGaffigan, 2025-26 First Team
- Justina Valentini, 2025-26 First Team
- Ava McGaffigan, 2025-26 Second Team

=== NEWHA All-Rookie ===
- Jenna Chaplain, 2023-24 NEWHA All-Rookie Team
- Alexa Hanrahan, 2023-24 NEWHA All-Rookie Team
- Natalie Joiner, 2025-26 NEWHA All-Rookie Team

=== NEWHA All-Sportswomanship ===
- Kayla McGaffigan, 2023-24 NEWHA All-Sportswomanship Team
- Ava McGaffigan, 2024-25 NEWHA All-Sportswomanship Team
- Annabel Ziskin, 2025-26 NEWHA All-Sportswomanship Team
