= Manness =

Manness is a surname. Notable people with the surname include:

- Clayton Manness (born 1947), Canadian politician
- Sara Manness (born 2007), Canadian ice hockey player
