= Sacred Heart Pioneers ice hockey =

Sacred Heart Pioneers ice hockey may refer to either of the ice hockey teams that represent Sacred Heart University:

- Sacred Heart Pioneers men's ice hockey
- Sacred Heart Pioneers women's ice hockey
