= Julie Chu Women's National Rookie of the Year Award =

College women's ice hockey honor

- Sport: Ice hockey
- Awarded for: The most outstanding rookie in NCAA Division I women's ice hockey
- Presented by: Women's Hockey Commissioners Association

History
- First award: 2014
- Most recent: Sara Manness; Hilda Svensson

The Julie Chu Women's National Rookie of the Year Award is awarded yearly to the most outstanding rookie player in NCAA Division I women's college ice hockey by the Women's Hockey Commissioners Association. In 2024 the award was renamed to honor former Harvard hockey player Julie Chu.

== Award winners ==
Season	Player	School	Reference
2014	Dani Cameranesi	Minnesota	
2015	Annie Pankowski	Wisconsin	
2016	Sarah Potomak	Minnesota	
2017	Jaycee Gebhard	Robert Morris	
2018	Daryl Watts	Boston College	
2019	Sarah Fillier	Princeton	
2020	Hannah Bilka	Boston College	
2021	Kiara Zanon	Penn State	
2022	Peyton Hemp	Minnesota	
2023	Tessa Janecke	Penn State	
2024	Joy Dunne	Ohio State	
2025	Caitlin Kraemer	Minnesota Duluth	
2026	Sara Manness	Clarkson	
2026	Hilda Svensson	Ohio State	

=== Winners by school ===
School	Winners
Minnesota	3
Boston College	2
Ohio State	2
Penn State	2
Clarkson	1
Minnesota Duluth	1
Princeton	1
Robert Morris	1
Wisconsin	1
