= Hilda Svensson =

Swedish ice hockey player (born 2006)

- Born: 24 August 2006 (age 20) Oskarshamn, Sweden
- Height: 168 cm (5 ft 6 in)
- Weight: 65 kg (143 lb; 10 st 3 lb)
- Position: Forward
- Shoots: Left
- WCHA team Former teams: Ohio State; HV71
- National team: Sweden
- Playing career: 2020–present
Medal record
World Championship
Bronze medal – third place	2026 Denmark

Hilda Svensson (born 24 August 2006) is a Swedish college ice hockey forward for the Ohio State Buckeyes of the National Collegiate Athletic Association (NCAA) and is a member of Sweden women's national ice hockey team. She previously played for HV71 of the Swedish Women's Hockey League (SDHL).

== Playing career ==
Svensson made her SDHL debut for HV71 during the 2020–21 season, where she recorded one assist in three games, while on loan from IF Troja-Ljungby. During the 2021–22 season she recorded one goal in five games. During the 2022–23 season, in her first full season with HV71, she was the top scoring junior player in the league and recorded nine goals and 13 assists in 32 games. Following the season she was named SDHL Rookie of the Year. During the 2023–24 season, she recorded seven goals and 16 assists in 32 games.

Svensson began her college ice hockey at Ohio State during the 2025–26 season. During October, she led Ohio State with 15 points in nine games. Her points total tied for the most in the league, while she led the WCHA with six multi-point games. She was subsequently named the WCHA Forward and Rookie of the Month. She was also named Co-Hockey Commissioners Association (HCA) Rookie of the Month. On 28 November 2025, in a game against Clarkson, she recorded her first career hat-trick, and finished the game with a career-high five points. She was subsequently named WCHA Rookie of the Week, her fourth weekly award of the season. During November, she led league rookies with 16 points and 2.29 points per game. She was subsequently named the WCHA Rookie of the Month and HCA Rookie of the Month for the second consecutive month. She missed eight games of the WCHA regular season to play for team Sweden at the 2026 Winter Olympics. She finished her freshman year with 18 goals and 32 assists in 31 games, and led her team in scoring with 50 points. Following the season she was named co-National Rookie of the Year, along with Sara Manness.

== International play ==
Svensson represented Sweden at the 2023 IIHF World Women's U18 Championship where she led the team in scoring and recorded four goals and two assists in six games and won a silver medal. Later that year she made her senior national team debut at the 2023 IIHF Women's World Championship at the age of sixteen years old. She led her team in scoring and recorded five goals and six assists in seven games. During her first IIHF World Women's Championship game she scored on her first shot in her first shift ten seconds into the game. During the quarterfinals against Canada, she scored the game-tying goal with ten second remaining in the game to force overtime.

She again represented Sweden at the 2024 IIHF World Women's U18 Championship where she recorded four goals and four assists in five games. During a preliminary round game against Slovakia she had a four-point game, recording two goals and two assists in the win. On 21 March 2024 she was again named to Sweden's roster for the 2024 IIHF Women's World Championship. She led the team in scoring with four goals and two assists in five games.

On 12 January 2026, she was named to Sweden's roster to compete at the 2026 Winter Olympics. In the quarterfinals of the 2026 Olympics, Svensson recorded a goal and an assist as Sweden eliminated Czechia in a 2–0 win. In the bronze medal game against Switzerland, she recorded an assist in a 2–1 overtime loss. She finished the tournament with one goal and six assists, and led her team in scoring with seven points. She helped the Sweden to its first Olympic semifinal appearance since 2014.

She represented Sweden at the 2026 IIHF Women's World Championship she recorded one goal and three assists in six games. During the bronze medal game against Finland, she scored the game-winning shootout goal to help Sweden win their first IIHF Women's World Championship medal since 2007.

== Career statistics ==
=== Regular season and playoffs ===
			Regular season					Playoffs
Season	Team	League	GP	G	A	Pts	PIM	GP	G	A	Pts	PIM
2020–21	HV71	SDHL	3	0	1	1	0	—	—	—	—	—
2021–22	HV71	SDHL	5	1	0	1	0	3	0	0	0	2
2022–23	HV71	SDHL	32	9	13	22	6	2	0	1	1	0
2023–24	HV71	SDHL	32	7	16	23	2	2	1	2	3	0
2024–25	HV71	SDHL	36	7	19	26	8	2	3	2	5	0
2025–26	Ohio State University	WCHA	33	18	34	52	2	—	—	—	—	—
SDHL totals			108	24	49	73	16	9	4	5	9	2

=== International ===
Year	Team	Event	Result	GP	G	A	Pts	PIM
2023	Sweden	U18	2nd place, silver medalist(s)	6	4	2	6	2
2023	Sweden	WC	6th	7	5	6	11	2
2024	Sweden	U18	5th	5	4	4	8	2
2024	Sweden	WC	7th	5	4	2	6	0
2025	Sweden	WC	6th	6	1	3	4	0
2026	Sweden	OG	4th	7	1	6	7	0
2026	Sweden	WC	3rd place, bronze medalist(s)	6	1	3	4	0
Junior totals				11	8	6	14	4
Senior totals				31	12	20	32	2
