= Franklin Pierce Ravens women's ice hockey =

- University: Franklin Pierce University
- Conference: NEWHA
- Head coach: David Stockdale; 15th season, 214–126–15
- Assistant coaches: Courtney Stone, Noah Kinsinger
- Captain(s): McKenzie Rich
- Arena: Jason Ritchie Ice Arena; Rindge, New Hampshire
- Colors: Crimson and gray

NCAA tournament appearances
- 2026

Conference tournament champions
- 2026

Conference regular season champions
- 2022, 2026

The Franklin Pierce Ravens women's ice hockey is the team that is a National Collegiate Athletic Association (NCAA) Division I college ice hockey program that represents Franklin Pierce University, located in Rindge, New Hampshire. The Ravens are members of New England Women's Hockey Alliance, having won the 2022 and 2026 regular season championships.

== History ==
The only head coach in program history is David Stockdale. Of note, the Ravens began play in the 2012–13 season, finishing with a record of 7–14–0.

Based in the ECAC East starting in 2014–15, the Ravens finished with a 20–6–1 mark.

For the 2017–18 season, the Ravens relocated to the NEWHA. Their Division I debut occurred in 2019–20.

Posting consecutive seasons of at least 20 wins in 2018–19 and 2019–20, the Ravens reached the postseason in both years. In 2019, the Ravens reached the league title game, finishing as runner up. In 2020, the Ravens played Saint Anselm in the NEWHA semifinals. The match lasted five overtime periods, losing in a 2-1 final. Of note, goaltender Emme Ostrander recorded 79 saves.

The 2021–22 season saw the program capture Post a conference record of 16-4-0 to win their first NEWHA regular season championship. In the postseason, the Ravens posted consecutive shutouts, beating Saint Anselm by a 1-0 mark in the postseason championship game. The Ravens became the fourth league champion. Worth noting, goaltender Suzette Faucher won a program record 22 games during the season, capturing the NEWHA Goaltender of the Year Award.

During the 2025-26 season, Anna Caumo became the first player in program history named to an Olympic roster, skating for the Italian national team. The Ravens finished the regular season with an 18–10–2 overall mark, finishing first in the NEWHA conference standings.

Facing off against Saint Anselm in the NEWHA Championship Game, Jill Hertl recorded 41 saves in a 2–0 final. Bo Dean and Abigail Broz contributed the goals. With their NEWHA tournament championship victory, the Ravens qualified for the 2026 NCAA Division I women's ice hockey tournament for the first time in program history.

=== Season-by-season results ===
Won championship	Lost championship	Conference champions	League leader

Year	Coach	W	L	T	Conference	Conf. W	Conf. L	Conf. T	Finish	Conference Tournament	NCAA Tournament
2025–26	David Stockdale	21	11	2	NEWHA	18	8	2	1st	Won First Round vs Saint Michael's (8-0, 5-1), Won Semifinals vs Stonehill (2-1, 2OT), Won Finals vs Saint Anselm (2-0)	First Round vs. Quinnipiac
2024–25	David Stockdale	17	14	1	NEWHA	17	10	1	2nd	Lost First Round vs Post (0-1, 0-1)	
2023–24	David Stockdale	18	16	1	NEWHA	14	13	1	5th	Won First Round vs Sacred Heart (3-1, 2-0), Won Semifinals vs LIU 4-3, Lost Finals vs Stonehill 2-3	
2022–23	David Stockdale	18	15	3	NEWHA	13	8	3	4th	Won First Round vs Sacred Heart (1-2, 2-1, 4-0), Lost Semifinals vs LIU 1-2	
2021–22	David Stockdale	22	9	1	NEWHA	16	4	0	1st	Won Semifinals vs Sacred Heart (2-0), Won Finals vs Saint Anselm (1-0)	
2019–20	David Stockdale	21	11	0	NEWHA	13	7	0	2nd	Lost Semifinals vs Saint Anselm (1–2) (5OT)	
2018–19	David Stockdale	14	9	1	NEWHA	8	7	1	3rd	Won Semifinals vs Sacred Heart (3-2), Lost vs Saint Anselm (0–3)	

=== Team captains ===
- 2021-22: Bridget Fagan A
- 2022-23: Ava Kison C
- 2023-24: Mikayla Kelley C, Jenna Ruiz C
- 2024-25: Mikayla Kelley C, Julia Stevens C
- 2025-26: Maggie Korneta C, Alexandria Cistolo A, McKenzie Rich A

== Scoring Leaders ==
Player	Seasons	Points
Alex Brolsma	2014-18	123
Karsyn Baker	2012-16	121
Marissa Massaro	2017-22	112
Nicole Amato	103	2017-21
Haley Parker	102	2017-21
Marissa Ketterman	101	2013-17
Bridgette Prentiss	97	2016-20
Mikayla Kelley	89	2021-25
Colleen Doucette	87	2012-16
Meg Gilbride	78	2016-20

== Awards and Honors ==
- Addison Andre, NEWHA Rookie of the Month (January 2026)

=== NEWHA Honors ===
- Bridgette Prentiss, 2020 NEWHA Defender of the Year
- Becca Kniss, 2020 NEWHA Rookie of the Year
- Suzette Faucher, 2022 NEWHA Goaltender of the Year
- David Stockdale, 2022 NEWHA Coach of the Year
- Maggie Korneta, 2025 NEWHA Defensive Player of the Year
- Jill Hertl, 2026 NEWHA Goaltender of the Year
- Addison Andre, 2026 NEWHA Rookie of the Year
- David Stockdale, 2026 NEWHA Coach of the Year

==== All-Rookie ====
- Emma Ostrander, 2018 NEWHA All-Rookie Team
- Stefanie Caban, 2020 NEWHA All-Rookie Team
- Becca Kniss, 2020 NEWHA All-Rookie Team
- Geno Hendrickson, 2022 NEWHA All-Rookie Team
- Avery Farrell, 2023 NEWHA All-Rookie Team
- Jill Hertl, 2023 NEWHA All-Rookie Team
- Addison Andre, 2026 NEWHA All-Rookie Team

==== All-Stars ====
Player	Season	Team
Haley Parker	2017-18	First Team
Bridgette Prentiss	2017-18	First Team
Nicole Amato	2017-18	Second Team
Marissa Massaro	2017-18	Second Team
Bridgette Prentiss	2019-20	First Team
Haley Parker	2019-20	First Team
Nicole Amato	2019-20	Second Team
Emma Ostrander	2019-20	Second Team
Suzette Faucher	2021-22	First Team
Stefanie Caban	2021-22	First Team
Emile Prive	2021-22	First Team
Stefanie Caban	2022-23	First Team
Jill Hertl	2025-26	First Team
Maggie Korneta	2025-26	First Team
Caleigh Murphy	2025-26	Second Team

==== All-Sportswomanship ====
- Katie Neuberger, 2018 NEWHA All-Sportswomanship Team
- Jessica Strack, 2020 NEWHA All-Sportswomanship Team
- Bridget Fagan, 2022 NEWHA All-Sportswomanship Team
- Ava Kison, 2023 NEWHA All-Sportswomanship Team
- Delaney Bonaficio, 2024 NEWHA All-Sportswomanship Team
- Julia Stevens, 2025 NEWHA All-Sportswomanship Team
- Ashley Wright, 2026 NEWHA All-Sportswomanship Team

=== NEWHA Postseason ===
- Jenna Ruiz, 2024 NEWHA All-Tournament Team
- Alexandria Cistolo, 2024 NEWHA All-Tournament Team

== Olympians ==
- Anna Caumo, Italy Forward: Ice hockey at the 2026 Winter Olympics – Women's tournament.
