= Maddy Christian =

American ice hockey player (born 2004)

- Born: December 24, 2004 (age 21) Elk River, Minnesota, U.S.
- Height: 5 ft 7 in (170 cm)
- Position: Forward
- Shoots: Left
- PWHL team: Minnesota Frost
- Playing career: 2022–present

Madelyn Christian (born December 12, 2004) is an American professional ice hockey player who is a forward for the Minnesota Frost of the Professional Women's Hockey League (PWHL). She played college ice hockey at Penn State.

== Early life ==
Christian was born to Matt and Christi Christian, and has two younger brothers, Jake and Joe. Her father played hockey at the University of Minnesota-Duluth and the University of Anchorage-Alaska.

== Playing career ==
=== College ===
Christian began her college ice hockey career for Penn State during the 2022–23 season. During her freshman year, she recorded one goal and four assists in 38 games. During the 2023–24 season, in her sophomore year, she recorded five goals and six assists in 38 games. During the 2024–25 season, in her junior year, she recorded 21 goals and 12 assists in 38 games. Following the season she was named to the All-AHA Second Team. During the 2025–26 season, in her senior year, she recorded 19 goals and 16 assists in 39 games. Following the season she was named to the All-AHA Second Team for the second consecutive year. She finished her collegiate career with 46 goals and 38 assists in 153 games.

=== Professional ===
On June 17, 2026, Christian was drafted in the third round, 33rd overall, by the Minnesota Frost in the 2026 PWHL Draft.

== Career statistics ==
			Regular season					Playoffs
Season	Team	League	GP	G	A	Pts	PIM	GP	G	A	Pts	PIM
2022–23	Penn State University	CHA	38	1	4	5	19	—	—	—	—	—
2023–24	Penn State University	CHA	38	5	6	11	8	—	—	—	—	—
2024–25	Penn State University	AHA	38	21	12	33	33	—	—	—	—	—
2025–26	Penn State University	AHA	39	19	16	35	16	—	—	—	—	—
NCAA totals			153	46	38	84	76	—	—	—	—	—
