= Sara Manness =

Canadian ice hockey player (born 2007)

- Born: September 26, 2007 (age 19) Winnipeg, Manitoba, Canada
- Height: 5 ft 9 in (175 cm)
- Position: Forward
- Shoots: Left
- ECAC team: Clarkson
- National team: Canada
- Playing career: 2025–present
Medal record
World Championships
Silver medal – second place	2026 Denmark

Sara Manness (born September 26, 2007) is a Canadian college ice hockey forward for the Clarkson Golden Knights of the National Collegiate Athletic Association (NCAA).

== Playing career ==
Manness originally had a verbal commitment to play college ice hockey at Minnesota in 2023, before committing to play for Clarkson.

She began her collegiate career during the 2025–26 season. During October, she led all freshmen with 12 assists and was named Co-Hockey Commissioners Association (HCA) Rookie of the Month, along with Hilda Svensson. On January 24, 2026, in a game against Harvard, she became the first Clarkson player in program history to score a goal in 10 consecutive games in one season, surpassing the previous record of nine consecutive games set by Loren Gabel during the 2017–18 season. During January, she recorded 14 goals, and nine assists in 11 games. She had at least one point in each game and had nine multi-point games, including three multi-goal games, four game winners and her third career hat-trick. She was subsequently named ECAC Rookie of the Month and HCA Rookie of the Month. During her freshman year she led the conference in scoring with 21 goals and 31 assists in 22 games. She led all rookies nationally and in the ECAC in game-winning goals (6), points (52), and goals (21).

Following the season she was named to the All-ECAC first team and All-ECAC rookie team. She was also named ECAC Rookie of the Year, Forward of the Year and Player of the Year. She became the first rookie to win ECAC Player of the Year. She was also named co-National Rookie of the Year, along with Hilda Svensson.

== International play ==
Manness represented Team Manitoba at the 2023 National Women's Under-18 Championship and tied for the tournament lead in scoring with five goals and four assists in five games. She was subsequently named MVP. Following her performance at the National Under-18 Championship, she was selected to represent Canada at the 2024 IIHF U18 Women's World Championship where she was the youngest member for team Canada. During the tournament she recorded three assists in six games and won a bronze medal.

On December 10, 2024, she was again selected to represent Canada at the 2025 IIHF U18 Women's World Championship, along with her twin sister, Kate. The twins became the fifth set of sisters to represent Canada at the U18 World Championship, and the first to do so together at the same competition. During the tournament she recorded two goals and seven assists in six games and won a gold medal.

On October 19, 2026, she was selected for the senior women's national team for the 2026 IIHF Women's World Championship for the first time.

== Personal life ==
Manness was born to April and Jason Manness, and has a twin sister, Kate, and an older sister, Alison.

== Career statistics ==
=== Regular season and playoffs ===
			Regular season					Playoffs
Season	Team	League	GP	G	A	Pts	PIM	GP	G	A	Pts	PIM
2023–24	Burlington Jr. Barracudas	OWHL	39	43	57	100	28	—	—	—	—	—
2024–25	Burlington Jr. Barracudas	OWHL	29	26	27	53	26	4	0	2	2	0
OWHL totals			68	69	84	153	54	4	0	2	2	0

=== International ===
Year	Team	Event	Result	GP	G	A	Pts	PIM
2024	Canada	U18	3rd place, bronze medalist(s)	6	0	3	3	0
2025	Canada	U18	1st place, gold medalist(s)	6	2	7	9	0
Junior totals				12	2	10	12	0

== Awards and honours ==
Honors	Year
College
First Team All-ECAC	2026
ECAC All-Rookie Team	2026
ECAC Player of the Year	2026
ECAC Forward of the Year	2026
ECAC Rookie of the Year	2026
National Rookie of the Year	2026
