= Delaware Fightin' Blue Hens women's ice hockey =

- Current season
- University: University of Delaware
- Conference: AHA
- Head coach: Allison Coomey; 1st season
- Assistant coaches: Melissa Samoskevich; Taylor Willard
- Arena: Fred Rust Ice Arena; Newark, Delaware
- Colors: Royal blue and gold

The Delaware Fightin' Blue Hens women's ice hockey team is a college ice hockey program that represents the University of Delaware. The Fightin' Blue Hens are a member of the Atlantic Hockey America (AHA) and play their home games at Fred Rust Ice Arena in Newark, Delaware. The team began play during the 2025–26 season.

== History ==
In December 2023, it was announced Delaware would add one women's sport due to Title IX considerations. The new women's sport would later be announced as ice hockey, and Delaware was initially announced to be joining College Hockey America (CHA) for its first season of varsity play in 2025–26. However, by that time, CHA had already announced plans to merge with the men-only Atlantic Hockey Association after the 2023–24 season. In March 2024, Allison Coomey was named the inaugural head coach. On April 30, 2024, the merged conference was unveiled as Atlantic Hockey America, with Delaware joining for the 2025–26 season.

== Season-by-season results ==
Won championship	Lost championship	Conference champions	League leader

Year	Coach	W	L	T	Conference	Conf. W	Conf. L	Conf. T	Finish	Conference Tournament	NCAA Tournament
2025–26	Allison Coomey	2	31	0	Atlantic Hockey America	1	23	0	7th	Lost First Round vs. Robert Morris (2–3)	Did not qualify

== Current roster ==
As of October 6, 2025.

No.	Nat.	Player	Class	Pos	Height	DoB	Hometown	Previous team
1	(United States)	Mattie Robitzer	Junior	G	5' 5" (1.65 m)	2003-10-20	Kennett Square, Pennsylvania	Northeastern
2	(United States)	Lexie Lonask	Freshman	D	5' 8" (1.73 m)	2007-01-10	Chandler, Arizona	Shattuck-Saint Mary's School
3	(United States)	Madison Bonavita	Freshman	F	6' 0" (1.83 m)	0000-00-00	Longmeadow, Massachusetts	Milton Academy
4	(United States)	Tiana McIntyre	Senior	D	5' 8" (1.73 m)	2004-03-26	Park City, Utah	Quinnipiac
5	(Canada)	Emma MacIntyre	Freshman	D	5' 4" (1.63 m)	2007-07-26	Halifax, Nova Scotia	Stanstead College
6	(United States)	Kacey Blum	Freshman	F	5' 6" (1.68 m)	2006-00-00	McLean, Virginia	Washington Pride
8	(Canada)	Victoria Borg	Freshman	F	5' 4" (1.63 m)	2007-07-22	Burlington, Ontario	Blyth Academy
9	(United States)	Bailey Gray	Freshman	D	5' 4" (1.63 m)	2006-11-15	Plymouth, Minnesota	Benilde-St. Margaret's
10	(United States)	Danica Mark	Junior	F	5' 7" (1.7 m)	2004-12-13	Duluth, Minnesota	Union
11	(United States)	Charlie Voge	Freshman	F	5' 6" (1.68 m)	2006-04-18	Sun Prairie, Wisconsin	St. Paul's School
13	(United States)	Kaitlin Finnegan	Graduate	F	5' 4" (1.63 m)	2002-02-05	Tecumseh, Kansas	Lindenwood
15	(United States)	Wren Abboud	Freshman	F	5' 2" (1.57 m)	2005-05-31	Weymouth, Massachusetts	Thayer Academy
16	(United States)	Eva Mayo	Freshman	F/D	5' 6" (1.68 m)	2006-11-16	Honeoye Falls, New York	Kent School
17	(United States)	Suvina Heidt	Freshman	D	5' 6" (1.68 m)	2006-08-28	Aurora, Colorado	Winchendon School
18	(Canada)	Francesca Barresi	Freshman	F	5' 6" (1.68 m)	2007-00-00	Ottawa, Ontario	Ottawa Lady Jr. Sens U22
19	(Canada)	Katelynn Charlton	Junior	F	5' 7" (1.7 m)	2006-07-12	Brampton, Ontario	Burlington Barracudas U22
20	(Canada)	Meera Smith	Freshman	F	5' 6" (1.68 m)	2006-05-05	Victoria, British Columbia	Shawnigan Lake School
21	(United States)	Billi Roman	Freshman	F	5' 3" (1.6 m)	2007-01-00	Hockessin, Delaware	Philadelphia Jr. Flyers
24	(United States)	Taylor Schooley	Freshman	D	5' 6" (1.68 m)	2007-03-28	Moon Township, Pennsylvania	Pittsburgh Penguins Elite
27	(Norway)	Ida Haave	Freshman	F	5' 6" (1.68 m)	2006-01-02	Kristiansand, Norway	Norges Toppidrettsgymnas Lillehammer
31	(Canada)	Charlotte Payne	Freshman	G	5' 8" (1.73 m)	2006-08-25	Oakville, Ontario	Oakville Jr. Hornets
35	(United States)	Sydney Butler	Senior	G	5' 6" (1.68 m)	2004-09-12	Darien, Connecticut	Delaware (ACHA)
