= Kendall Butze =

American ice hockey player (born 2003)

- Born: August 3, 2003 (age 23) Cleveland, Ohio, U.S.
- Height: 5 ft 3 in (160 cm)
- Position: Defense
- Shoots: Left
- PWHL team Former teams: Vegas Vanguards; Penn State Nittany Lions
- Playing career: 2022–present

Kendall Butze (born August 3, 2003) is an American professional ice hockey defender for the Vegas Vanguards of the Professional Women's Hockey League (PWHL). She played college ice hockey at Penn State.

== Playing career ==
=== College ===
Butze began her college ice hockey career for Penn State during the 2022–23 season. During her freshman year she recorded two goals and 17 assists in 36 games and was named to the CHA All-Rookie team. During the 2023–24 season, in her sophomore year, she recorded four goals and 11 assists in 38 games.

During the 2024–25 season, in her junior year, she recorded four goals and 23 assists in 38 games. Following the season she was named to the All-AHA First Team and AHA Defenseman of the Year. During the 2025–26 season, in her senior year, she recorded a career-high five goals and 28 assists in 39 games. Following the season she was named to the All-AHA First Team and AHA Defenseman of the Year for the second consecutive year. She became the first back-to-back winner of the award since its namesake, Molly Bryne, in 2014 and 2015.

She finished her collegiate career as Penn State's all-time leading scorer by a defenseman with 94 points and set the record for most assists by a defenseman with 79.

=== Professional ===
On June 17, 2026, Butze was drafted in the fifth round, 49th overall, as the only defender chosen by Vegas Vanguards in the 2026 PWHL Draft. On October 6, 2026, the team announced that she had signed a two-year standard player agreement through the 2027–28 season.

== Personal life ==
Butze was born to Kenneth and Tracy Butze, and has two older sisters, Taylor and Schuyler.

== Career statistics ==
			Regular season					Playoffs
Season	Team	League	GP	G	A	Pts	PIM	GP	G	A	Pts	PIM
2022–23	Penn State University	CHA	36	2	17	19	4	—	—	—	—	—
2023–24	Penn State University	CHA	38	4	11	15	6	—	—	—	—	—
2024–25	Penn State University	AHA	38	4	23	27	10	—	—	—	—	—
2025–26	Penn State University	AHA	39	5	28	33	4	—	—	—	—	—
NCAA totals			151	15	79	94	24	—	—	—	—	—

== Awards and honors ==
Honors	Year	Ref
College
First Team All-AHA	2025	
AHA Defenseman of the Year	2025	
First Team All-AHA	2026	
AHA Defenseman of the Year	2026	
