= Katie DeSa =

American ice hockey player (born 2004)

- Born: January 21, 2004 (age 22) Pawcatuck, Connecticut, U.S.
- Height: 5 ft 8 in (173 cm)
- Position: Goaltender
- Catches: Left
- PWHL team: Vancouver Goldeneyes
- Playing career: 2022–present

Katelyn DeSa (born January 21, 2004) is an American professional ice hockey goaltender for the Vancouver Goldeneyes of the Professional Women's Hockey League (PWHL). She played college ice hockey at Penn State, where she is the program's all-time leader in shutouts with 25.

== Early life ==
DeSa was born to Bill and Tonya DeSa, and has two older sisters, Alexis and Casey. Her father played college baseball for Providence College.

== Playing career ==
=== College ===
DeSa began her college ice hockey career for Penn State during the 2022–23 season. During her freshman year she appeared in three games and made 24 saves with six goals allowed in 127:41 minutes. During the 2023–24 season, in her sophomore year, she appeared in 16 games and posted a 9–3–2 record, with a .938 save percentage and 1.39 goals against average (GAA).

During the 2024–25 season, in her junior 3year, she appeared in 33 games and posted a 27–6–0 record, with a .932 save percentage and 1.42 GAA. Her 27 wins were the most in a single season in program history and ranked second nationally. She earned nine shutouts, tied for the most in Penn State history and second in the nation. She ranked second nationally in winning percentage (.818) and fourth in GAA (1.418). Following the season she was named the AHA Goaltender of the Year and an All-AHA First Team honoree. She was also named a semifinalist for the HCA Goalie of the Year award.

During the 2025–26 season, in her senior 3year, she appeared in 31 games and posted a 27–4–0 record, with a .936 save percentage and 1.36 GAA. Her 27 wins tied her single-season program record and ranked second nationally. She led the nation with 12 shutouts, and set a single-season Penn State record. She ranked second nationally in GAA, and first in the AHA. Following the season she was named the AHA Goaltender of the Year for the second consecutive season, becoming only the second goaltender to win the award in consecutive years. She was also named to the All-AHA First Team for a second straight season, and a semifinalist for the HCA Goalie of the Year award. During the regional semifinal of the 2026 NCAA tournament against UConn, she recorded her 12th shutout of the season to help Penn State advance to their first Frozen Four in program history.

She finished her career with the most shutouts in program history (25) and set Penn State records in winning percentage (0.818) and GAA (1.43).

=== Professional ===
On June 17, 2026, DeSa was drafted in the fourth round, 37th overall, by the Vancouver Goldeneyes in the 2026 PWHL Draft.

== Career statistics ==
			Regular season									Playoffs
Season	Team	League	GP	W	L	OTL	MIN	GA	SO	GAA	SV%	GP	W	L	MIN	GA	SO	GAA	SV%
2022–23	Penn State University	CHA	5	1	0	1	128	6	0	2.82	.800	—	—	—	—	—	—	—	—
2023–24	Penn State University	CHA	16	9	3	2	863	20	4	1.39	.938	—	—	—	—	—	—	—	—
2024–25	Penn State University	AHA	33	27	6	0	1,947	46	9	1.42	.932	—	—	—	—	—	—	—	—
2025–26	Penn State University	AHA	31	27	4	0	1,803	41	12	1.37	.936	—	—	—	—	—	—	—	—
NCAA totals			85	64	13	3	4,741	113	25	1.43	.932	—	—	—	—	—	—	—	—
