= Tessa Janecke =

American ice hockey player (born 2004)

- Born: May 12, 2004 (age 22) Orangeville, Illinois, US
- Height: 5 ft 8 in (173 cm)
- Weight: 160 lb (73 kg; 11 st 6 lb)
- Position: Forward
- Shoots: Left
- PWHL team Former teams: Vegas Vanguards; Penn State
- National team: United States
- Playing career: 2022–present
Medal record
Olympic Games
Gold medal – first place	2026 Milano Cortina	Team
World Championship
Gold medal – first place	2023 Canada
Gold medal – first place	2025 Czechia
Gold medal – first place	2026 Denmark
Silver medal – second place	2024 United States
World U18 Championship
Silver medal – second place	2022 United States

Tessa Janecke (born May 12, 2004) is an American professional ice hockey player for the Vegas Vanguards in the Professional Women’s Hockey League (PWHL). She played college ice hockey for Penn State. She is also a member of the United States women's national ice hockey team. A two-time world champion with Team USA, she scored the overtime game-winning goal in the 2025 World Championship gold medal game against Canada. At the collegiate level, she is Penn State's all-time leading scorer, a two-time conference player of the year, back-to-back Patty Kazmaier Award top-ten finalist, and the HCA National Rookie of the Year in 2023. On July 17, 2026, she was selected in the first round, third overall, by the Vegas Vanguards.

== Early life ==
Janecke attended Orangeville High School remotely while she attended North American Hockey Academy. During her senior season, she captained the Winter Hawks and recorded 46 goals and 76 assists in 78 games. She lettered in ice hockey and softball for four years. In December 2018, she verbally committed to Penn State University. She was named a three-time First Team-All State honoree as a softball player in high school. She was named the 2021 Softball Player of the Year by the Illinois High School Association (IHSA) after she helped lead Orangeville to a third-place finish in the Class 1A state softball tournament.

== Playing career ==
=== College ===
Janecke began her collegiate career for Penn State during the 2022–23 season. She made her debut on September 22, 2022, in a game against Wisconsin, where she scored two goals and one assist. During September and October, she recorded nine goals and five assists for 14 points. She also recorded four multi-point games, including two multi-goal games. She was subsequently named the College Hockey America (CHA) Rookie of the Month for October, her first monthly honor. She was named the Hockey Commissioners Association Women's National Rookie of the Month in December 2022, after she recorded three goals and six assists for nine points during the month. She became the third Nittany Lion player ever to win a national Player of the Month award. She led the team in points for February, scoring five goals and seven assists for 12 points. She also recorded four multi-point games in the six games played in the month. She was subsequently named the CHA Forward of the Month and Rookie of the Month.

On February 25, 2023, during the CHA semifinals, Janecke recorded her first career hat-trick in a game against Lindenwood. This was the second hat-trick in program history scored during the postseason. With the win, Penn State advanced to their first CHA Championship game in program history. During the championship game against Mercyhurst, Janekce assisted on the game-winning overtime goal, to help Penn State win their first CHA tournament championship and advance to the NCAA women's ice hockey tournament for the first time in program history. During her freshman year she recorded 22 goals and 25 assists in 38 games. She set the single-season program records for freshman points, assists and goals. Her 47 points tied for first among freshmen, while her 22 goals ranked second in the nation. Following an outstanding season she was named to the USCHO All-Rookie Team, USCHO Co-Rookie of the Year, CHA Rookie of the Year and HCA National Rookie of the Year.

During the 2023–24 season, in her sophomore year, she recorded 17 goals and 36 assists in 37 games. She led the nation in faceoff wins with 607. After scoring a goal on February 23, 2024, during the second game of the CHA tournament semifinals, she reached the 100 points milestone. In just 74 games played, she became the fastest player in program history to reach the milestone. She was named CHA Forward of the Week four times and CHA Forward of the Month three times. Following the season she was named first-team All-CHA, CHA Player of the Year and CHA Forward of the Year. She was also named a top-ten finalist for the Patty Kazmaier Award.

During the 2024–25 season, in her junior year, she recorded 24 goals and 29 assists in 38 games. On January 25, 2025, in a game against Lindenwood, she recorded a goal to become Penn State's all-time leading scorer, male or female, with 141 points. She recorded 28 points in conference play, and was named the AHA scoring champion. She led the AHA in points, points per game, goals, goals per game, shots (205), shots per game (5.69) and plus/minus (+36). She also ranked second in assists, assists per game, and power play goals and tied for third in short-handed goals. Following the season she was named first-team All-AHA, AHA Player of the Year and AHA Forward of the Year. She was also named a top-ten finalist for the Patty Kazmaier Award for the second consecutive year.

=== Professional ===
On June 17, 2026, Janecke was selected third overall by the Vegas Vanguards in the 2026 PHWL Draft, making her the first player selected via draft in team franchise history.

== International play ==
Janecke represented the United States at the 2022 IIHF World Women's U18 Championship where she recorded three goals and three assists in five games and won a silver medal.

On April 1, 2023, she was named to the roster for the United States at the 2023 IIHF Women's World Championship, where she made her senior national team debut. During the tournament she recorded three goals and three assists in seven games and won a gold medal. On March 31, 2024, she was again named to the United States roster for the 2024 IIHF Women's World Championship. During the tournament she recorded one goal and three assists in seven games and won a silver medal.

On March 5, 2025, she was again selected to represent the United States at the 2025 IIHF Women's World Championship. During the tournament she recorded three goals and three assists in seven games and won a gold medal. She scored the game-winning overtime goal in the gold medal game against Canada.

On December 11, 2025, Janecke scored a goal in a 10-4 victory versus Canada. Held in Edmonton, Alberta, this was the third game of the 2025 Rivalry Series, marking the first time that the Canadian women's national ice hockey team allowed 10 goals in a loss to the United States.

On January 2, 2026, she was named to team USA's roster to compete at the 2026 Winter Olympics. Janecke was one of four Nittany Lions participating in women's ice hockey at the 2026 Winter Olympics, including Matilde Fantin, skating for Team Italy, plus Jessica Adolfsson and Nicole Hall, both members of Team Sweden. In the first preliminary round game for the U.S. against Czechia, Janecke recorded a pair of assists, including the assist on Joy Dunne's first Olympic goal.

== Personal life ==
According to her USA Hockey profile, Janecke's favorite postgame meal is Smoothies.

== Career statistics ==
=== Regular season and playoffs ===
			Regular season
Season	Team	League	GP	G	A	Pts	PIM
2022–23	Penn State University	CHA	38	22	25	47	34
2023–24	Penn State University	CHA	37	17	36	53	50
2024–25	Penn State University	AHA	38	24	29	53	67
2025–26	Penn State University	AHA	31	26	22	48	72
NCAA totals			113	63	90	153	151

=== International ===
Year	Team	Event	Result	GP	G	A	Pts	PIM
2022	United States	U18	2nd place, silver medalist(s)	5	3	3	6	2
2023	United States	WC	1st place, gold medalist(s)	7	3	3	6	2
2024	United States	WC	2nd place, silver medalist(s)	7	1	3	4	0
2025	United States	WC	1st place, gold medalist(s)	7	3	3	6	0
2026	United States	OG	1st place, gold medalist(s)	7	0	5	5	0
Junior totals				5	3	3	6	2
Senior totals				28	7	14	21	2

== Awards and honors ==
Honors	Year
College
USCHO All-Rookie Team	2023
USCHO Co-Rookie of the Year	2023
CHA Rookie of the Year	2023
HCA National Rookie of the Year	2023
First Team All-CHA	2024
CHA Player of the Year	2024
CHA Forward of the Year	2024
CCM/AHCA Second Team All-American	2024
First Team All-AHA	2025
AHA Player of the Year	2025
AHA Forward of the Year	2025

== See also ==
- List of Pennsylvania State University Olympians
