= Katelyn Roberts =

American ice hockey player (born 2004)

- Born: April 12, 2004 (age 22) Chanhassen, Minnesota, U.S.
- Height: 5 ft 7 in (170 cm)
- Position: Forward
- Shoots: Right
- PWHL team: New York Sirens
- Playing career: 2026–present

Katelyn Roberts (born April 12, 2004) is an American professional ice hockey forward for the New York Sirens of the Professional Women's Hockey League (PWHL). She played college ice hockey at Penn State.

== Playing career ==
=== College ===
During the 2025-26 season, Roberts served as an alternate captain for Penn State. In the final game of the season, she recorded her 100th career point, becoming the sixth player in program history to achieve the feat. In addition, she set a program record with seven game winning goals during the season.

=== Professional ===
On June 17, 2026, Roberts was drafted in the fourth round, 43rd overall, by the New York Sirens in the 2026 PWHL Draft.

== Awards and honors ==
- All AHA First Team (2024-25)
- All AHA Second Team (2025-26)
