= Sacred Heart Pioneers women's ice hockey =

- Current season
- University: Sacred Heart University
- Conference: NEWHA
- Head coach: Thomas O'Malley; 23rd season
- Assistant coaches: Allison Roethke; Caroline Peterson
- Arena: Martire Family Arena; Fairfield, Connecticut
- Colors: Red and white

NCAA tournament appearances
- 2025

Conference tournament champions
- 2018, 2025

Conference regular season champions
- 2020

The Sacred Heart Pioneers women's ice hockey team is a National Collegiate Athletic Association (NCAA) Division I college ice hockey program that represents Sacred Heart University. The Pioneers, members of New England Women's Hockey Alliance (a founding member since 2018) play at the Martire Family Arena in Fairfield, Connecticut. The team began play in 1996. They reached the NCAA Tournament for the first time ever in 2025.

== History ==
=== Season-by-season results ===
Won championship	Lost championship	Conference champions	League leader

Year	Coach	W	L	T	Finish	Conference Tournament	NCAA Tournament
2025-26	Tom O'Malley	13	19	2	6th, NEWHA	Lost First Round vs Saint Anselm (1-3, 2-3)	
2024-25	Tom O'Malley	21	15	3	2nd, NEWHA	Won First Round vs. Assumption (3–0, 3-2); Won Second Round vs. Saint Anselm (2-0) (2–0); Won Championship Round vs. Long Island (4-2) (2–0)	Lost First Round vs. Minnesota Duluth (1–6)
2023-24	Tom O'Malley	15	21	2	4th, NEWHA	Lost First Round vs. Franklin Pierce (1-3, 0-2)	
2022-23	Tom O'Malley	16	18	3	5th, NEWHA	Lost First Round vs. Franklin Pierce (2-1, 1-2 (OT), 0-4)	
2021-22	Tom O'Malley	16	15	2	4th, NEWHA	Won First Round vs. Post (5-2); Lost Second Round vs. Franklin Pierce (0-2)	

=== Team Captains ===
- 2024-25: Sydney Antonakis C, Paige McNeil C, Kate Helgeson A, Jillian Petruno A
- 2025-26: Olivia Laroche C, Jillian Petruno C, Sami Bowlby A, Izzy Chaput A

== Pioneers in Pro Hockey ==
Player	Team	League	Season(s)	Title(s)
Jayne Lewis	Metropolitan Riveters	PHF	Two	None
Amie Varano	EV Bozen Eagles; Malmo Redhawks	EWHL; Sweden	2021-23; 2023-present	

== Olympians ==
- Amie Varano, Italy, 2026 Winter Olympics.

== Awards and Honors ==
=== NEWHA Honors ===
- Jayne Lewis, 2020 NEWHA Player of the Year
- Anna Klein, 2022 NEWHA Player of the Year
- Kelly Solak, 2022 NEWHA Defender of the Year

=== NEWHA Weekly Awards ===
Goalie of the Week

- Jillian Petruno, NEWHA Goaltender of the Week (awarded February 17, 2026)
- Jillian Petruno, NEWHA Goaltender of the Week (awarded February 10, 2026)

Rookie of the Week

- Hailey Jussila, NEWHA Goaltender of the Week (awarded February 3, 2026)

=== NEWHA All-Stars ===
- Kelly Solak, 2023 NEWHA Second Team All-Star
- Delani McKay, 2023 NEWHA Second Team All-Star
- Jillian Petruno, 2024 NEWHA Second Team All-Star
- Isabella Chaput, 2025 NEWHA Second Team All-Star

==== All-Rookie ====
- Isabella Chaput, 2024 NEWHA All-Rookie Team
- Ella Holm, 2025 NEWHA All-Rookie Team

==== All-Sportswomanship ====
- Natalie Kennedy, 2023 NEWHA All-Sportswomanship Team
- Samantha Ostrowski, 2024 NEWHA All-Sportswomanship Team
- Kerryn O'Connell, 2025 NEWHA All-Sportswomanship Team
- Ella Dahl, 2026 NEWHA All-Sportswomanship Team

=== NEWHA Postseason ===
- Sarah Erban, 2018 NEWHA Tournament - Most Outstanding Player
- Olivia Bryant, 2018 NEWHA All-Tournament Team
- Jayne Lewis, 2018 NEWHA All-Tournament Team
- Taylor Moreland, 2018 NEWHA All-Tournament Team
- Carly Greene, 2025 NEWHA Tournament - Most Outstanding Player
- Isabella Chaput, 2025 NEWHA All-Tournament Team
- Grayson Limke, 2025 NEWHA All-Tournament Team
- Savannah Popick, 2025 NEWHA All-Tournament Team
