= Saint Anselm Hawks women's ice hockey =

- University: Saint Anselm College
- Conference: NEWHA
- Head coach: Sam Ftorek; 2nd season, 28–36–8
- Assistant coaches: Jessica Salisbury; Joe Deleaut
- Captain(s): Mackenzie Moss; Brooklyn Schneiderhan; Cora Webber
- Arena: Thomas F. Sullivan Arena; Goffstown, New Hampshire
- Colors: Blue and white

Conference tournament champions
- 2019

Conference regular season champions
- 2018, 2019

The Saint Anselm Hawks women's ice hockey team is a National Collegiate Athletic Association (NCAA) Division I college ice hockey program that represents Saint Anselm College. The Hawks, members of New England Women's Hockey Alliance (a founding member since 2018) play at the Thomas F. Sullivan Arena in Goffstown, New Hampshire.

== History ==
=== Season-by-season results ===
Won championship	Lost championship	Conference champions	League leader

Year	Coach	W	L	T	Finish	Conference Tournament	NCAA Tournament
2025-26	Sam Ftorek	16	17	1	3rd, NEWHA	Won First Round, vs Sacred Heart Pioneers (3–2, 3–1), Won Semifinals vs Assumption (2–0), Lost Finals, vs Franklin Pierce, 2-0	
2024-25	Sam Ftorek	12	19	7	5th, NEWHA	Won First Round vs Stonehill, Lost Semifinals vs Sacred Heart	
2023-24	Jennifer Kindret	20	16	1	2nd, NEWHA	Won First Round vs Saint Michael's, Lost Semifinals vs Stonehill	
2022-23	Jennifer Kindret	18	17	4	3rd, NEWHA	Won First Round vs Post, Won Semifinals vs Stonehill, Lost Finals vs LIU (0–2)	
2021-22	Jennifer Kindret	16	13	3	3rd, NEWHA	Lost Finals, vs. Franklin Pierce (0–1)	
2019-20	Kerstin Matthews	16	14	3	3rd, NEWHA	Lost Finals vs LIU (0–1)	
2018-19	Kerstin Matthews	25	3	1	1st, NEWHA	Won Finals, vs. Post (5–1)	
2017-18	Kerstin Matthews	21	4	4	1st, NEWHA	Won Semifinals, vs. Franklin Pierce, Lost Finals, vs. Sacred Heart (1–3)	

=== Team captains ===
- 2021-22: Erin Myers C, Kendra Currier A, Kelly Golini A, Gabrielle HusonA
- 2022-23: Kelly Golini C, Gabrielle Huson C, Allie Kelley A
- 2023-24: Maddy McCaffery C, Savannah Popick A, Tyra Turner A, Claire Weber A
- 2024-25: Heather McAvoy C, Tyra Turner C, Brooklyn Schneiderhan A
- 2025-26: Mackenzie Moss C, Brooklyn Schneiderhan C, Cora Webber C

== Awards and Honors ==
=== NEWHA Awards ===
- Katie Meehan, 2019 NEWHA Player of the Year
- Tyra Turner, 2022 NEWHA Rookie of the Year
- Kelly Golini, 2023 NEWHA Player of the Year
- Brooklyn Schneiderhan, 2026 NEWHA Player of the Year

=== NEWHA All-Stars ===
- Kelly Golini, 2023 NEWHA First Team All-Star
- Gabrielle Huson, 2023 NEWHA Second Team All-Star
- Natalie Tulchinski, 2024 NEWHA First Team All-Star
- Audrey Jackson, 2024 NEWHA Second Team All-Star
- Tyra Turner, 2025 NEWHA Second Team All-Star
- Brooklyn Schneiderhan, 2026 NEWHA First Team All-Star

=== NEWHA All-Rookie ===
- Brooklyn Pancoast, 2023 NEWHA All-Rookie
- Courtney Stagman, 2024 NEWHA All-Rookie

=== NEWHA All-Sportswomanship ===
- Gabrielle Hudson, 2023 NEWHA All-Sportswomanship Team
- Savannah Popick, 2024 NEWHA All-Sportswomanship Team
- Alexis Poppleton, 2025 NEWHA All-Sportswomanship Team
- Sydney Merritt, 2026 NEWHA All-Sportswomanship Team

=== NEWHA Postseason ===
- Haley Marshall, 2018 NEWHA All-Tournament Team
- Ashley Moran, 2018 NEWHA All-Tournament Team
