= 2025–26 NCAA Division I women's ice hockey rankings =

Women's ice hockey rankings

- NCAA tournament: 2026
- Preseason No. 1 (USA Today): Wisconsin
- Preseason No. 1 (USCHO): Wisconsin
- NCAA Division I women's ice hockey rankings

Two polls make up the 2025–26 NCAA Division I women's ice hockey rankings, the USCHO.com poll and the USA Hockey College Hockey poll. As the 2025–26 season progresses, rankings are updated weekly.

== Legend ==
	Increase in ranking
	Decrease in ranking
	Not ranked previous week
Italics	Number of first place votes
(#-#)	Win–loss–tie record
т	Tied with team above or below also with this symbol

== USCHO ==
	Preseason Sep 15	Week 1 Sep 29	Week 2 Oct 6	Week 3 Oct 13	Week 4 Oct 20	Week 5 Oct 27	Week 6 Nov 3	Week 7 Nov 10	Week 8 Nov 17	Week 9 Nov 24	Week 10 Dec 1	Week 11 Dec 8	Week 12 Jan 5	Week 13 Jan 12	Week 14 Jan 19	Week 15 Jan 26	Week 16 Feb 2	Week 17 Feb 9	Week 18 Feb 16	Week 19 Feb 23	Week 20 Mar 2	Week 21 Mar 9	Final Mar 23	
1.	Wisconsin (20)	Wisconsin (2–0–0) (20)	Wisconsin (4–0–0) (19)	Wisconsin (6–0–0) (20)	Wisconsin (8–0–0) (20)	Wisconsin (10–0–0) (20)	Wisconsin (11–1–0) (20)	Wisconsin (11–1–0) (20)	Wisconsin (12–1–1) (16)	Wisconsin (14–1–1) (16)	Wisconsin (16–1–1) (15)	Wisconsin (18–1–1) (20)	Wisconsin (18–1–1) (20)	Wisconsin (19–1–2) (20)	Wisconsin (21–1–2) (20)	Wisconsin (23–1–2) (20)	Wisconsin (24–2–2) (19)	Wisconsin (25–3–2) (19)	Wisconsin (27–3–2) (18)	Wisconsin (29–3–2) (19)	Wisconsin (31–3–2) (18)	Ohio State (34–4–0) (19)	Wisconsin (35–4–2) (20)	1.
2.	Ohio State	Ohio State (0–0–0)	Ohio State (2–0–0) (1)	Ohio State (4–0–0)	Ohio State (5–1–0)	Ohio State (7–1–0)	Minnesota (10–2–0)	Minnesota (10–2–0)	Minnesota (12–2–0) (2)	Ohio State (13–1–0) (4)	Ohio State (15–1–0) (5)	Ohio State (15–3–0)	Ohio State (17–3–0)	Ohio State (19–3–0)	Ohio State (21–3–0)	Ohio State (23–3–0)	Ohio State (25–3–0) (1)	Ohio State (26–4–0) (1)	Ohio State (28–4–0) (2)	Ohio State (30–4–0) (1)	Ohio State (32–4–0) (2)	Wisconsin (32–4–2) (1)	Ohio State (36–5–0)	2.
3.	Minnesota	Minnesota (2–0–0)	Minnesota (4–0–0)	Minnesota (6–0–0)	Minnesota (7–1–0)	Minnesota (9–1–0)	Ohio State (9–1–0)	Ohio State (9–1–0)	Ohio State (11–1–0) (2)	Minnesota (12–4–0)	Minnesota (12–4–0)	Minnesota (14–4–0)	Minnesota (16–4–0)	Minnesota (18–4–0)	Minnesota (20–4–0)	Minnesota (22–4–0)	Minnesota (23–5–0)	Minnesota (24–5–1)	Minnesota (24–7–1)	Penn State (29–5–0)	Penn State (31–5–0)	Penn State (32–5–0)	Penn State (33–6–0)	3.
4.	Cornell	Cornell (0–0–0)	Minnesota Duluth (4–0–0)	Minnesota Duluth (4–2–0)	Minnesota Duluth (6–2–0)	Cornell (4–0–0)	Cornell (7–0–0)	Cornell (7–0–0)	Cornell (8–1–0)	Penn State (16–0–0)	Penn State (17–1–0)	Penn State (17–1–0)	Penn State (18–3–0)	Penn State (19–4–0)	Penn State (21–4–0)	Penn State (24–4–0)	Penn State (26–4–0)	Penn State (28–4–0)	Penn State (29–5–0)	Minnesota (24–9–1)	Minnesota (26–10–1)	Minnesota (26–11–1)	Northeastern (29–9–1)	4.
5.	Colgate	Minnesota Duluth (4–0–0)	Cornell (0–0–0)	Cornell (0–0–0)	Cornell (2–0–0)	Minnesota Duluth (6–4–0)	Minnesota Duluth (8–4–0)	Minnesota Duluth (8–4–0)	Minnesota Duluth (10–4–0)	Cornell (9–2–0)	Minnesota Duluth (10–6–0)	Minnesota Duluth (12–6–0)	Connecticut (15–3–2)	Connecticut (17–3–2)	Connecticut (18–4–2)	Quinnipiac (21–5–2)	Northeastern (21–6–1)	Northeastern (23–6–1)	Northeastern (24–7–1)	Northeastern (26–7–1)	Northeastern (27–7–1)	Northeastern (28–8–1)	Minnesota (26–12–1)	5.
6.	Minnesota Duluth	Penn State (2–0–0)	Penn State (4–0–0)	Penn State (6–0–0)	Penn State (8–0–0)	Penn State (10–0–0)	Penn State (12–0–0)	Penn State (12–0–0)	Penn State (14–0–0)	Minnesota Duluth (10–6–0)	Northeastern (13–3–0)	Connecticut (13–3–2)	Northeastern (15–4–0)	Quinnipiac (17–5–2)	Quinnipiac (19–5–2)	Northeastern (20–6–0)	Connecticut (19–7–2)	Connecticut (21–7–2)	Connecticut (23–7–2)	Connecticut (24–8–2)	Connecticut (25–8–2)	Connecticut (27–8–2)	Connecticut (28–9–2)	6.
7.	Clarkson	Colgate (0–0–0)	Quinnipiac (4–0–0)	Quinnipiac (6–0–0)	Quinnipiac (8–0–0)	Quinnipiac (9–1–0)	Quinnipiac (11–1–0)	Quinnipiac (12–1–1)	Quinnipiac (12–1–1)	Northeastern (12–2–0)	Connecticut (12–3–1)	Northeastern (15–4–0)	Quinnipiac (15–5–2)	Northeastern (16–5–0)	Princeton (17–4–0)	Connecticut (18–6–2)	Princeton (19–6–0)	Quinnipiac (22–7–3)	Quinnipiac (24–7–3)	Quinnipiac (24–7–3)	Yale (24–8–0)	Quinnipiac (28–8–3)	Quinnipiac (29–9–3)	7.
8.	Penn State	Quinnipiac (2–0–0)	Colgate (0–2–0)	Colgate (2–2–0)	Connecticut (4–2–0)	Connecticut (5–2–1)	Connecticut (7–2–1)	Northeastern (8–2–0)	Northeastern (10–2–0)	Connecticut (10–3–1)	Cornell (10–3–1)	Quinnipiac (14–5–1)	Minnesota Duluth (12–8–0)	Minnesota Duluth (12–9–1)	Northeastern (17–6–0)	Princeton (17–6–0)	Quinnipiac (21–7–2)	Princeton (20–7–0)	Yale (22–8–0)	Yale (22–8–0)	Quinnipiac (26–8–3)	Yale (25–9–0)	Yale (26–10–0)	8.
9.	St. Lawrence	Clarkson (1–1–0)	Clarkson (2–2–0)	Clarkson (2–2–0)	Colgate (3–3–0)	Clarkson (5–3–0)	Northeastern (6–2–0)	Connecticut (8–3–1)	Connecticut (8–3–1)	Quinnipiac (12–3–1)	Quinnipiac (13–4–1)	Princeton (11–4–0)	Princeton (13–4–0)	Princeton (15–4–0)	Minnesota Duluth (12–10–2)	Minnesota Duluth (13–10–3)	Yale (19–7–0)	Yale (21–7–0)	Princeton (21–8–0)	Minnesota Duluth (19–12–3)	Princeton (23–9–0)	Princeton (23–10–0)	Princeton (23–11–0)	9.
10.	Quinnipiac	St. Lawrence (0–2–0)	St. Cloud State (3–1–0)	St. Cloud State (3–3–0)	Clarkson (3–3–0)	St. Cloud State (4–6–0)	St. Cloud State (4–8–0)	St. Cloud State (4–8–0) т	St. Cloud State (4–9–1)	Clarkson (9–5–1)	Clarkson (10–6–1)	Cornell (10–5–1)	Cornell (10–6–1)	Cornell (11–6–2)	Yale (16–7–0)	Yale (17–7–0)	Minnesota Duluth (13–12–3)	Minnesota Duluth (15–12–3)	Minnesota Duluth (17–12–3)	Princeton (21–8–0)	Minnesota Duluth (20–14–3)	Minnesota Duluth (20–14–3)	Minnesota Duluth (20–15–3)	10.
11.	Boston University	St. Cloud State (3–1–0)	Connecticut (2–2–0)	Connecticut (2–2–0)	St. Cloud State (4–4–0)	Colgate (4–4–0)	Clarkson (6–4–0)	Yale (4–2–0) т	Clarkson (7–5–1)	Brown (8–3–1)	Princeton (9–4–0)	Clarkson (11–6–2)	Clarkson (13–6–2)	Clarkson (13–7–3)	Clarkson (15–7–3)	Clarkson (18–7–3)	Clarkson (19–8–3)	Cornell (16–10–2)	Cornell (18–10–2)	Cornell (18–10–2)	Cornell (20–10–2)	Cornell (20–11–2)	Cornell (20–11–2)	11.
12.	Connecticut	Connecticut (1–1–0)	St. Lawrence (1–3–0)	Northeastern (4–0–0)	Northeastern (4–2–0)	Northeastern (4–2–0)	Yale (4–2–0)	Clarkson (6–5–1)	Brown (7–2–1)	Colgate (8–7–1)	Minnesota State (10–7–1)	Minnesota State (11–8–1)	Minnesota State (11–8–1)	Colgate (12–10–1)	Cornell (12–7–2)	Cornell (13–9–2)	Cornell (14–10–2)	Clarkson (19–10–3)	Clarkson (20–11–3)	Mercyhurst (21–10–3)	Mercyhurst (23–10–3)	Mercyhurst (23–11–3)	Mercyhurst (23–11–3)	12.
13.	St. Cloud State	Boston University (0–0–0)	Northeastern (2–0–0)	Boston University (0–4–0)	St. Thomas (5–2–0) т	St. Thomas (7–3–0)	Colgate (4–5–1)	Brown (5–2–1)	Colgate (6–7–1)	Princeton (8–4–0)	St. Cloud State (6–11–1)	St. Cloud State (7–12–1)	Colgate (10–10–1)	Yale (14–7–0)	Minnesota State (11–12–1)	Holy Cross (18–7–1)	Holy Cross (18–8–2)	Mercyhurst (20–10–2)	Mercyhurst (21–10–3)	Colgate (19–14–1)	Minnesota State (17–18–2)	Minnesota State (17–19–2)	Minnesota State (17–19–2)	13.
14.	Princeton	Northeastern (0–0–0)	Boston University (0–2–0)	St. Lawrence (1–4–1)	Yale (2–0–0) т	Yale (3–1–0)	St. Thomas (7–5–0)	Colgate (5–6–1)	Yale (6–3–0)	St. Cloud State (5–10–1)	Colgate (8–9–1)	Colgate (9–10–1)	Yale (11–7–0)	Minnesota State (11–10–1)	Holy Cross (16–7–1)	Minnesota State (11–13–2)	Mercyhurst (20–10–2)	Holy Cross (18–10–2)	Colgate (18–14–1)	Minnesota State (15–17–2)	Colgate (19–16–1)	Colgate (19–16–1)	Clarkson (20–12–3)	14.
15.	Northeastern	Princeton (0–0–0)	Mercyhurst (3–3–0) т Princeton (0–0–0) т	Mercyhurst (3–3–0)	Boston University (0–5–0)	Brown (3–1–0)	Brown (3–2–1)	St. Thomas (8–6–0)	St. Thomas (8–8–0)	Minnesota State (8–7–1)	Yale (8–6–0)	Yale (9–7–0)	St. Cloud State (7–12–1)	St. Cloud State (7–14–1)	St. Cloud State (8–14–2)	Mercyhurst (18–10–2)	Minnesota State (12–14–2)	Colgate (17–13–1)	Minnesota State (13–17–2)	Clarkson (20–12–3)	Clarkson (20–12–3)	Clarkson (20–12–3)	Colgate (19–16–1)	15.
	Preseason Sep 15	Week 1 Sep 29	Week 2 Oct 6	Week 3 Oct 13	Week 4 Oct 20	Week 5 Oct 27	Week 6 Nov 3	Week 7 Nov 10	Week 8 Nov 17	Week 9 Nov 24	Week 10 Dec 1	Week 11 Dec 8	Week 12 Jan 5	Week 13 Jan 12	Week 14 Jan 19	Week 15 Jan 26	Week 16 Feb 2	Week 17 Feb 9	Week 18 Feb 16	Week 19 Feb 23	Week 20 Mar 2	Week 21 Mar 9	Final Mar 23	
		None	None	Dropped: Princeton	Dropped: Mercyhurst; St. Lawrence	Dropped: Boston University	None	None	None	Dropped: Yale; St. Thomas	Dropped: Brown	None	None	None	Dropped: Colgate	Dropped: St. Cloud State	None	Dropped: Minnesota State	Dropped: Holy Cross	None	None	None	None	

== USA Hockey ==
	Preseason Sep 16	Week 1 Sep 23	Week 2 Sep 30	Week 3 Oct 7	Week 4 Oct 14	Week 5 Oct 21	Week 6 Oct 28	Week 7 Nov 4	Week 8 Nov 11	Week 9 Nov 18	Week 10 Nov 25	Week 11 Dec 2	Week 12 Dec 9	Week 13 Dec 16	Week 14 Jan 6	Week 15 Jan 13	Week 16 Jan 20	Week 17 Jan 27	Week 18 Feb 3	Week 19 Feb 10	Week 20 Feb 17	Week 21 Feb 24	Week 22 Mar 3	Week 23 Mar 10	Week 24 Mar 17	Final Mar 24	
1.	Wisconsin (19)	Wisconsin (0–0–0) (19)	Wisconsin (2–0–0) (19)	Wisconsin (4–0–0) (19)	Wisconsin (6–0–0) (19)	Wisconsin (8–0–0) (19)	Wisconsin (10–0–0) (19)	Wisconsin (11–1–0) (18)	Wisconsin (11–1–0) (18)	Wisconsin (12–1–1) (16)	Wisconsin (14–1–1) (14)	Wisconsin (16–1–1) (12)	Wisconsin (18–1–1) (19)	Wisconsin (18–1–1) (19)	Wisconsin (18–1–1) (19)	Wisconsin (19–1–2) (19)	Wisconsin (21–1–2) (19)	Wisconsin (23–1–2) (19)	Wisconsin (24–2–2) (17)	Wisconsin (25–3–2) (11)	Wisconsin (27–3–2) (18)	Wisconsin (29–3–2) (19)	Wisconsin (31–3–2) (18)	Ohio State (34–4–0) (16)	Ohio State (35–4–0) (15)	Wisconsin (35–4–2) (19)	1.
2.	Ohio State	Ohio State (0–0–0)	Ohio State (0–0–0)	Ohio State (2–0–0)	Ohio State (4–0–0)	Ohio State (5–1–0)	Ohio State (7–1–0)	Minnesota (10–2–0)	Minnesota (10–2–0)	Minnesota (12–2–0) (1)	Ohio State (13–1–0) (5)	Ohio State (15–1–0) (7)	Ohio State (15–3–0)	Ohio State (15–3–0)	Ohio State (17–3–0)	Ohio State (19–3–0)	Ohio State (21–3–0)	Ohio State (23–3–0)	Ohio State (25–3–0) (1)	Ohio State (26–4–0) (8)	Ohio State (28–4–0) (1)	Ohio State (30–4–0)	Ohio State (32–4–0) (1)	Wisconsin (32–4–2) (3)	Wisconsin (33–4–2) (4)	Ohio State (36–5–0)	2.
3.	Minnesota	Minnesota (0–0–0)	Minnesota (2–0–0)	Minnesota (4–0–0)	Minnesota (6–0–0)	Minnesota (7–1–0)	Minnesota (9–1–0)	Ohio State (9–1–0) (1)	Ohio State (9–1–0) (1)	Ohio State (11–1–0) (2)	Minnesota (12–4–0)	Minnesota (12–4–0)	Minnesota (14–4–0)	Minnesota (14–4–0)	Minnesota (16–4–0)	Minnesota (18–4–0)	Minnesota (20–4–0)	Minnesota (22–4–0)	Minnesota (23–5–0)	Minnesota (24–5–1)	Minnesota (24–7–1)	Penn State (29–5–0)	Penn State (31–5–0)	Penn State (32–5–0)	Penn State (33–5–0)	Penn State (33–6–0)	3.
4.	Cornell	Cornell (0–0–0)	Cornell (0–0–0)	Cornell (0–0–0)	Cornell (0–0–0)	Cornell (2–0–0)	Cornell (4–0–0)	Cornell (7–0–0)	Cornell (7–0–0)	Minnesota Duluth (10–4–0)	Penn State (16–0–0)	Penn State (17–1–0)	Penn State (17–1–0)	Penn State (17–1–0)	Penn State (18–3–0)	Penn State (19–4–0)	Penn State (21–4–0)	Penn State (24–4–0)	Penn State (26–4–0)	Penn State (28–4–0)	Penn State (29–5–0)	Minnesota (24–9–1)	Minnesota (26–10–1)	Minnesota (26–11–1)	Northeastern (29–8–1)	Northeastern (29–9–1)	4.
5.	Minnesota Duluth	Minnesota Duluth (2–0–0)	Minnesota Duluth (4–0–0)	Minnesota Duluth (4–0–0)	Minnesota Duluth (4–2–0)	Minnesota Duluth (6–2–0)	Minnesota Duluth (6–4–0)	Minnesota Duluth (8–4–0)	Minnesota Duluth (8–4–0)	Cornell (8–1–0)	Minnesota Duluth (10–6–0)	Minnesota Duluth (10–6–0)	Minnesota Duluth (12–6–0)	Minnesota Duluth (12–6–0)	Connecticut (15–3–2)	Connecticut (17–3–2)	Connecticut (18–4–2)	Quinnipiac (21–5–2)	Northeastern (21–6–1)	Northeastern (23–6–1)	Northeastern (24–7–1)	Northeastern (26–7–1)	Northeastern (27–7–1)	Northeastern (28–8–1)	Minnesota (26–12–1)	Minnesota (26–12–1)	5.
6.	Colgate	Colgate (0–0–0)	Colgate (0–0–0)	Penn State (4–0–0)	Penn State (6–0–0)	Penn State (8–0–0)	Penn State (10–0–0)	Penn State (12–0–0)	Penn State (12–0–0)	Penn State (14–0–0)	Cornell (9–2–0)	Northeastern (13–3–0)	Northeastern (15–4–0)	Northeastern (15–4–0)	Northeastern (15–4–0)	Quinnipiac (17–5–2)	Quinnipiac (19–5–2)	Northeastern (20–6–0)	Princeton (19–6–0) т	Connecticut (21–7–2)	Connecticut (23–7–2)	Connecticut (24–8–2)	Connecticut (25–8–2)	Connecticut (27–8–2)	Connecticut (28–9–2)	Connecticut (28–9–2)	6.
7.	Clarkson	Clarkson (0–0–0)	Penn State (2–0–0)	Quinnipiac (4–0–0)	Quinnipiac (6–0–0)	Quinnipiac (8–0–0)	Quinnipiac (9–1–0)	Quinnipiac (11–1–0)	Quinnipiac (12–1–1)	Quinnipiac (12–1–1)	Northeastern (12–2–0)	Connecticut (12–3–1)	Connecticut (13–3–2)	Connecticut (13–3–2)	Quinnipiac (15–5–2)	Northeastern (16–5–0)	Princeton (17–4–0)	Connecticut (18–6–2)	Quinnipiac (21–7–2) т	Quinnipiac (22–7–3)	Quinnipiac (24–7–3)	Quinnipiac (24–7–3)	Quinnipiac (26–8–3)	Quinnipiac (28–8–3)	Quinnipiac (29–9–3)	Quinnipiac (29–9–3)	7.
8.	Penn State	Penn State (0–0–0)	Quinnipiac (2–0–0)	Colgate (0–2–0)	Colgate (2–2–0)	Colgate (3–3–0)	Connecticut (5–2–1)	Connecticut (7–2–1)	Connecticut (8–3–1)	Northeastern (10–2–0)	Connecticut (10–3–1)	Cornell (10–3–0)	Quinnipiac (14–5–1)	Quinnipiac (14–5–1)	Minnesota Duluth (12–8–0)	Minnesota Duluth (12–9–1)	Northeastern (17–6–0)	Princeton (17–6–0)	Connecticut (19–7–2)	Princeton (20–7–0)	Yale (22–8–0)	Yale (22–8–0)	Yale (24–8–0)	Yale (25–9–0)	Yale (26–10–0)	Yale (26–10–0)	8.
9.	St. Lawrence	St. Lawrence (0–0–0)	Clarkson (1–1–0)	Clarkson (2–2–0)	Clarkson (2–2–0)	Connecticut (4–2–0)	Clarkson (5–3–0)	Northeastern (6–2–0)	Northeastern (8–2–0)	Connecticut (8–3–1)	Quinnipiac (12–3–1)	Quinnipiac (13–4–1)	Princeton (11–4–0)	Princeton (11–4–0)	Princeton (13–4–0)	Princeton (15–4–0)	Minnesota Duluth (12–10–2)	Minnesota Duluth (13–10–3)	Yale (19–7–0)	Yale (21–7–0)	Princeton (21–8–0)	Minnesota Duluth (19–12–3)	Princeton (23–9–0)	Princeton (23–10–0)	Princeton (23–11–0)	Princeton (23–11–0)	9.
10.	Quinnipiac	Quinnipiac (0–0–0)	St. Lawrence (0–2–0)	St. Cloud State (3–1–0)	St. Cloud State (3–3–0)	Clarkson (3–3–0)	Colgate (4–4–0)	Clarkson (6–4–0)	Yale (5–2–0)	St. Cloud State (4–9–1)	Clarkson (9–5–1)	Clarkson (10–6–1)	Clarkson (11–6–2)	Cornell (10–5–1)	Cornell (10–6–1)	Cornell (11–6–2)	Yale (17–7–0)	Yale (17–7–0)	Minnesota Duluth (13–12–3)	Minnesota Duluth (15–12–3)	Minnesota Duluth (17–12–3)	Princeton (21–8–0)	Cornell (20–10–2) т	Minnesota Duluth (20–14–3)	Minnesota Duluth (20–15–3)	Minnesota Duluth (20–15–3)	10.
11.	Boston University	Boston University (0–0–0)	St. Cloud State (3–1–0)	Connecticut (2–2–0)	Connecticut (2–2–0)	St. Cloud State (4–4–0)	St. Cloud State (4–6–0)	St. Cloud State (4–8–0)	Clarkson (6–5–1)	Clarkson (7–5–1)	Brown (8–3–1)	Princeton (9–4–0)	Cornell (10–5–1)	Clarkson (11–6–2)	Clarkson (13–6–2)	Yale (14–7–0)	Cornell (12–7–2)	Clarkson (18–7–3)	Clarkson (19–8–3)	Cornell (19–10–2)	Cornell (18–10–2)	Cornell (18–10–2)	Minnesota Duluth (20–14–3) т	Cornell (20–11–2)	Cornell (20–11–2)	Cornell (20–11–2)	11.
12.	Connecticut	St. Cloud State (2–0–0)	Connecticut (1–1–0)	St. Lawrence (1–3–0)	Northeastern (4–0–0)	Northeastern (4–2–0)	Northeastern (4–2–0)	Colgate (4–5–1)	St. Cloud State (4–8–0)	Colgate (6–7–1)	Colgate (8–7–1)	Minnesota State (10–7–1)	Minnesota State (11–8–1)	Minnesota State (11–8–1)	Minnesota State (11–8–1)	Clarkson (13–7–3)	Clarkson (15–7–3)	Cornell (13–9–2)	Cornell (14–10–2)	Clarkson (19–10–3)	Clarkson (20–11–3)	Mercyhurst (21–10–3)	Mercyhurst (23–10–3)	Mercyhurst (23–11–3)	Mercyhurst (23–11–3)	Mercyhurst (23–11–3)	12.
13.	St. Cloud State	Connecticut (0–0–0)	Boston University (0–0–0)	Northeastern (2–0–0)	Boston University (0–4–0) т	St. Thomas (6–2–0)	St. Thomas (7–3–0) т	Yale (4–2–0)	Brown (5–2–1)	Brown (7–2–1)	Princeton (8–4–0)	Brown (8–5–1)	St. Cloud State (7–12–1)	St. Cloud State (7–12–1)	Yale (11–7–0)	Minnesota State (11–10–1)	Minnesota State (11–12–1)	Minnesota State (11–13–2)	Holy Cross (18–8–2)	Mercyhurst (20–10–2)	Mercyhurst (21–10–3)	Colgate (19–14–1)	Minnesota State (17–18–2)	Minnesota State (17–19–2)	Minnesota State (17–19–2)	Minnesota State (17–19–2)	13.
14.	Northeastern	Northeastern (0–0–0)	Northeastern (0–0–0)	Boston University (0–2–0)	St. Lawrence (1–4–1) т	Yale (2–0–0)	Yale (3–1–0) т	St. Thomas (7–5–0)	Colgate (5–6–1)	Yale (6–3–0)	St. Cloud State (5–10–1)	St. Cloud State (6–11–1)	Yale (9–7–0)	Yale (9–7–0)	St. Cloud State (7–12–1)	Colgate (12–10–1)	St. Cloud State (8–14–2)	Holy Cross (18–7–1)	Mercyhurst (20–10–2)	Colgate (17–13–1)	Colgate (18–14–1)	Minnesota State (15–17–2)	Clarkson (20–12–3) т	Clarkson (20–12–3)	Clarkson (20–12–3)	Clarkson (20–12–3)	14.
15.	Princeton	Princeton (0–0–0)	Princeton (0–0–0)	Princeton (0–0–0)	Mercyhurst (3–3–0) т Princeton (0–0–0) т	St. Lawrence (2–5–1)	Brown (3–1–0)	Brown (3–2–1)	St. Thomas (8–6–0)	St. Thomas (8–8–0)	Minnesota State (8–7–1)	Colgate (8–9–1)	Brown (9–6–1)	Brown (9–6–1)	Colgate (10–10–1)	St. Cloud State (7–14–1)	Colgate (12–12–1)	Mercyhurst (18–10–2)	Minnesota State (12–14–2)	Holy Cross (18–10–2)	Minnesota State (13–17–2)	Clarkson (20–12–3)	Colgate (19–16–1) т	Colgate (19–16–1)	Colgate (19–16–1)	Colgate (19–16–1)	15.
	Preseason Sep 16	Week 1 Sep 23	Week 2 Sep 30	Week 3 Oct 7	Week 4 Oct 14	Week 5 Oct 21	Week 6 Oct 28	Week 7 Nov 4	Week 8 Nov 11	Week 9 Nov 18	Week 10 Nov 25	Week 11 Dec 2	Week 12 Dec 9	Week 13 Dec 16	Week 14 Jan 6	Week 15 Jan 13	Week 16 Jan 20	Week 17 Jan 27	Week 18 Feb 3	Week 19 Feb 10	Week 20 Feb 17	Week 21 Feb 24	Week 22 Mar 3	Week 23 Mar 10	Week 24 Mar 17	Final Mar 24	
		None	None	None	None	Dropped: Boston University; Mercyhurst; Princeton	Dropped: St. Lawrence	None	None	None	Dropped: Yale; St. Thomas	None	Dropped: Colgate	None	Dropped: Brown	None	None	Dropped: Colgate; St. Cloud State	None	Dropped: Minnesota State	Dropped: Holy Cross	None	None	None	None	None	
