= Stonehill Skyhawks women's ice hockey =

- Current season
- University: Stonehill College
- Conference: NEWHA
- Head coach: Lee-J Mirasolo; 3rd season, 35–35–7
- Assistant coaches: Kendall Wagner; Erin Connolly
- Captain(s): Sydney Russell
- Alternate captain(s): Brianna Walkom
- Arena: Bridgewater Ice Arena; Bridgewater, Massachusetts
- Colors: Purple and white

NCAA tournament appearances
- 2024

Conference tournament champions
- 2024

The Stonehill Skyhawks women's ice hockey team represents Stonehill College in NCAA Division I ice hockey. On April 5, 2022, the school announced that they were promoting all of their varsity programs to Division I for the 2022–23 academic year. The team plays their home games at Bridgewater Ice Arena, located over 9 miles away from Stonehill's campus in Easton, Massachusetts. They play in the New England Women's Hockey Alliance. They finished 3rd in the league in their very first varsity season (2022–23).

== History ==
In May 2021, Tara Watchorn, a 2014 Olympic gold medalist, was hired as the first head coach for the Skyhawks. The program began play in the 2022–23 NEWHA season.

During the 2022–23 season, their first in the NEWHA, Alexis Petford led the conference with 25 goals scored. In 2022–23, only four members of the Skyhawks roster – Josie Mendeszoon (Union College), Katie Sonntag (Union College), Paige Whaley (Mercyhurst Lakers), and Hanna Zukow (Mercyhurst Lakers) – were not freshmen.

On March 9, 2024, Stonehill beat the Franklin Pierce Ravens by a 3–2 mark in overtime to win their first NEWHA postseason tournament title.

During the 2024–25 season, Aerin Frankel served as the Skyhawks goalie coach. The goalies on the Skyhawks roster during Frankel's season included Eve Stone, Kara Westlake and Alexsa Caron, who earned a place on the NEWHA All-Rookie Team. Of note, Caron set the single season record for saves (1,141) and shutouts (4), highlighted by a 61 save performance versus Ohio State on October 25, 2024, a single game program record.

In July 2025, Sydney Russell was named as team captain once again, making her the first player in program history to serve as team captain in consecutive years. Of note, Russell is the first player born and raised in Nashville to commit to play NCAA Division I ice hockey.

On November 28 and 30, 2025, Russell and the Skyhawks played in her hometown of Nashville, participating in the Smashville Women's Collegiate Hockey Showcase. The Mercyhurst Lakers defeated the Skyhawks by a 6–1 mark on November 28, followed by a 17–2 loss against the #1 ranked Wisconsin Badgers on November 30. Of note, the 17 goals represents a Badgers single game program record.

=== Season-by-season results ===
Won championship	Lost championship	Conference champions	League leader

Year	Coach	W	L	T	Finish	Conference Tournament	NCAA Tournament
2025–26	Lee-J Mirasolo	15	16	2	4th, NEWHA	Won First Round vs LIU Sharks (3–0, 4–3 OT), Lost Semifinals vs Franklin Pierce (1–2 2OT)	
2024–25	Lee-J Mirasolo	14	19	5	4th, NEWHA	Lost First Round vs Saint Anselm (W 2–1 2OT, L 3–4, L 2–4)	
2023–24	Lee-J Mirasolo	21	16	2	3rd, NEWHA	Won First Round vs. Assumption (3–2, 3–1); Won Second Round vs. Saint Anselm (3–2 OT); Won Championship Round vs. Franklin Pierce (3–2 OT)	Lost vs Cornell University (1–7)
2022–23	Tara Watchorn	19	16	2	2nd, NEWHA		

=== Team captains ===
- 2022–23: Paige Whaley A
- 2023–24: Grace Parker C, Paige Whaley C
- 2024–25: Sydney Russell C, Josie Mendeszoon C, Brianna Walkom A
- 2025–26: Sydney Russell C, Maddi Achtyl A, Brianna Walkom A

== Awards and Honors ==
- Alexis Petford, 2023 NEWHA Rookie of the Year

=== NEWHA All-Stars ===
- Alexis Petford, 2023 First Team All-Star
- Maeve Carey, 2023 Second Team All-Star
- Alexis Petford, 2024 First Team All-Star
- Bailey Feeney, 2025 Second Team All-Star
- Sydney Russell, 2025 Second Team All-Star
- Maddy Achttl, 2026 Second Team All-Star
- Reagan Whynnot, 2026 Second Team All-Star

=== NEWHA All-Rookie ===
- Alexis Petford, 2023 All-Rookie Team
- Sydney Russell, 2023 All-Rookie Team
- Pusle Dyring Anderson, 2024 All-Rookie Team
- Alexsa Caron, 2025 All-Rookie

=== NEWHA All-Sportswomanship ===
- Brianna Walkom, 2023 NEWHA All-Sportswomanship Team
- Makenna Slocum, 2026 NEWHA All-Sportswomanship Team

=== NEWHA Postseason ===
- Eve Stone, 2024 NEWHA Postseason Most Outstanding Player
- Bailey Feeney, 2024 NEWHA All-Tournament Team
- Pusle Dyring-Andersen, 2024 NEWHA All-Tournament Team
- Alexis Petford, 2024 NEWHA All-Tournament Team
