= Post Eagles women's ice hockey =

- University: Post University
- Conference: NEWHA
- Head coach: Brandon Brown (1st) season, 10–21–1 (.328)
- Assistant coaches: Shelby Page
- Captain(s): Hannah Saunders
- Arena: Sports Center of Connecticut
- Colors: Purple and orange

NCAA tournament appearances
- None

Conference tournament champions
- None

Conference regular season champions
- None

The Post Eagles women's ice hockey team is a National Collegiate Athletic Association (NCAA) Division I college ice hockey program that represents Post University. The Eagles, members of New England Women's Hockey Alliance (a founding member since 2018) play at the Sports Center of Connecticut in Waterbury, Connecticut. The program's all-time leading scorer is Caisey Van Den Oetelaar with 140 points.

== History ==
On November 9, 2018, Kaitlyn Daly stopped 89 of 97 shots in an 8-2 loss to Saint Anselm.

On March 1, 2025, Post defeated the Franklin Pierce Ravens by a 1-0 score. With the win, the seventh seeded Eagles reached the NEWHA semifinals for the first time ever. Julia Wysocki recorded the game winning goal while goaltender Hannah Saunders earned her eighth shutout of the season.

Following the 2024–25, Julia Wysocki became the first player in Post history to win the NEWHA Player of the Year Award. Winning the conference scoring title with 26 points, she was also the leader in goals scored with 17.

Brandon Brown, a 2022 graduate of Post University became Eagles head coach in 2025. On October 17, 2025, he earned his first win as the Eagles defeated the Franklin Pierce Ravens in a 3-2 final.

On February 14, 2026, Tymmarie Grom played in her 141st consecutive game for Post, setting a program record. Grom also became the Post all-time leader in games played.

=== Team captains ===
This is an incomplete list

- 2020–21: Paige Dundas and Kathleen Takita
- 2024–25: Angelique Pitter C, Hannah Saunders C, Maddy Noonan A, Caisey van den Oetelaar
- 2025–26: Hannah Saunders

== Season-by-season results ==
Won championship	Lost championship	Conference champions	League leader

Year	Coach	W	L	T	Finish	Conference Tournament	NCAA Tournament
2025-26	Brandon Brown	10	21	1	7th, NEWHA	Lost, First Round, vs Assumption (1-2 OT, 2-1, 2-4)	
2024-25	Gretchen Silverman	13	21	3	6th, NEWHA	Won, First Round vs Franklin Pierce, Lost, Second Round vs LIU	
2023-24	Gretchen Silverman	8	28	1	7th, NEWHA	Lost, First Round vs Saint Anselm	
2022-23	Gretchen Silverman	4	29	2	6th, NEWHA		
2021-22	Heath Isaacson	6	26	0	5th, NEWHA		
2019-20	Heath Isaacson	12	23	0	4th, NEWHA		
2018-19	Heath Isaacson	5	24	0	5th, NEWHA		

== Scoring Leaders ==
Player	Seasons	Points
Caisey Van Den Oetelaar	2021-25	140
Angeline Pitter	2021-25	139
Julia Wysocki	2021-25	135
Hannah Luckman	2021-25	131
Sajei Desai	2021-25	131
Molly Brumfield	2016-20	122
Kendall Fitzgerald	2016-20	122
Kalena Mueller	2016-20	122
Tymmarie Grom	2022-pres.	109
Tristan Currie	2022-pres.	106

== Awards and Honors ==
=== Statistical leaders ===
- Hannah Saunders, 2024-25 NEWHA leader, Goals Against Average - 1.92
- Hannah Saunders, 2024-25 NEWHA leader, Shutouts - 6
- Julia Wysocki, 2024-25 NEWHA Scoring Champion

=== NEWHA Awards ===
- Julia Wysocki, 2025 NEWHA Player of the Year
- Hannah Saunders, 2025 NEWHA Player of the Year
- Rowyn Ringor, 2025 NEWHA Player of the Year

==== All-Rookie ====
- Madeleine Noonan, 2023 NEWHA All-Rookie Team

=== NEWHA All-Stars ===
Year	Player	Position	Team
2025	Julia Wysocki	Forward	First Team
2025	Hannah Saunders	Goaltender	First Team
2025	Rowyn Ringor	Forward	Second Team
2026	Hannah Saunders	Goaltender	Second Team

=== All-Sportswomanship ===
- Jenna Abeyta, 2023 NEWHA All-Sportswomanship Team
- Grace Glasrud, 2024 NEWHA All-Sportswomanship Team
- Hannah Saunders, 2025 NEWHA All-Sportswomanship Team
- Maddy Noonan, 2026 NEWHA All-Sportswomanship Team
