= 2025–26 WCHA women's ice hockey season =

2025–26 WCHA women's season
- Season: 2025–26
- Conference: WCHA
- Division: Division I
- Sport: women's ice hockey
- Duration: September 19, 2025– February 21, 2026
- Number of teams: 8

Regular Season
- Season champions: Wisconsin

WCHA Tournament
- Tournament champions: Ohio State
- Runners-up: Wisconsin

NCAA Tournament
- Bids: 4
- Record: 5–3
- Best Finish: Champion
- Team(s): Wisconsin

The 2025–26 WCHA women's ice hockey season is the 27th season of the Western Collegiate Hockey Association and is taking place during the 2025–26 NCAA Division I women's ice hockey season. The regular season began on September 19, 2025, and will end on February 21, 2026.

== Standings ==
2025–26 Western Collegiate Hockey Association standings
| | Conference | | | | | | | | | | Overall | | | | | |
| | GP | W | L | T | OTW | OTL | SOW | PTS | GF | GA | GP | W | L | T | GF | GA |
|---|---|---|---|---|---|---|---|---|---|---|---|---|---|---|---|---|
| #1 Wisconsin † | 28 | 23 | 3 | 2 | 1 | 1 | 1 | 72 | 138 | 45 | 41 | 35 | 4 | 2 | 213 | 60 |
| #2 Ohio State * | 28 | 24 | 4 | 0 | 2 | 0 | 0 | 70 | 117 | 50 | 41 | 36 | 5 | 0 | 181 | 66 |
| #5 Minnesota | 28 | 18 | 9 | 1 | 1 | 2 | 1 | 57 | 115 | 70 | 39 | 26 | 12 | 1 | 173 | 86 |
| #10 Minnesota Duluth | 28 | 15 | 10 | 3 | 2 | 0 | 2 | 48 | 69 | 59 | 38 | 20 | 15 | 3 | 93 | 76 |
| #13 Minnesota State | 28 | 9 | 17 | 2 | 2 | 1 | 1 | 29 | 55 | 95 | 38 | 17 | 19 | 2 | 86 | 113 |
| St. Cloud State | 28 | 7 | 19 | 2 | 1 | 4 | 1 | 27 | 74 | 103 | 37 | 12 | 23 | 2 | 83 | 120 |
| St. Thomas | 28 | 7 | 20 | 1 | 3 | 5 | 0 | 24 | 49 | 95 | 36 | 12 | 23 | 1 | 81 | 117 |
| Bemidji State | 28 | 3 | 24 | 1 | 1 | 0 | 0 | 9 | 38 | 138 | 36 | 6 | 27 | 3 | 58 | 161 |
Championship: March 7, 2026 † indicates conference regular season champion; * indicates conference tournament champion Rankings: USCHO.com; updated March 23, 2026

== Conference tournament ==
Quarterfinals; February 27 – March 1
8 | Bemidji State | 0 | 2 | —
1 | Wisconsin | 7 | 3* | —
5 | Minnesota State | 0 | 2** | 2
4 | Minnesota Duluth | 2 | 1 | 1
7 | St. Thomas | 1 | 1 | —
2 | Ohio State | 5 | 4 | —
6 | St. Cloud State | 1* | 1 | 1
3 | Minnesota | 0 | 4 | 6

Semifinals; March 5
1 | Wisconsin | 7
5 | Minnesota State | 2
2 | Ohio State | 4
3 | Minnesota | 0

Championship; March 7
2 | Ohio State | 2
1 | Wisconsin | 1

Note: each * denotes one overtime period

== Awards ==
=== Players of the Month ===
As of October 10, 2026.

| Date | Forward of the Month | Defender of the Month | Goaltender of the Month | Rookie of the Month |
|---|---|---|---|---|
| September 2025 | Abbey Murphy (Minnesota) | Sydney Morrow (Minnesota) | Hailey Hansen (Minnesota State) | Bella Fanale (Minnesota) |
| October 2025 | Hilda Svensson (Ohio State) | Caroline Harvey (Wisconsin) | Hannah Clark (Minnesota) | Hilda Svensson (Ohio State) |
| November 2025 | Joy Dunne (Ohio State) | Caroline Harvey (Wisconsin) | Hailey Hansen (Minnesota State) | Hilda Svensson (Ohio State) |
| December 2025 | Jamie Nelson (Minnesota) | Caroline Harvey (Wisconsin) | Ava McNaughton (Wisconsin) | Maria Mikaelyan (St. Cloud State) |
| January 2026 | Abbey Murphy (Minnesota) | Caroline Harvey (Wisconsin) | Hailey MacLeod (Ohio State) | Bella Fanale (Minnesota) |
| February 2026 | Lacey Eden (Wisconsin) | Emma Peschel (Ohio State) | Ève Gascon (Minnesota Duluth) | Rhyah Stewart (Wisconsin) |

=== Players of the Week ===
As of October 10, 2026.

| Date | Forward of the Week | Defender of the Week | Goaltender of the Week | Rookie of the Week |
|---|---|---|---|---|
| September 22, 2025 | Rylee Bartz (St. Thomas) | Siiri Yrjölä (St. Cloud State) | Hailey Hansen (Minnesota State) | Zoe Lopez (Minnesota State) |
| September 27, 2025 | Abbey Murphy (Minnesota) | Sydney Morrow (Minnesota) | Ève Gascon (Minnesota Duluth) | Bella Fanale (Minnesota) |
| October 6, 2025 | Abbey Murphy (Minnesota) | Laila Edwards (Wisconsin) | Ava McNaughton (Wisconsin) | Hilda Svensson (Ohio State) |
| October 13, 2025 | Kirsten Simms (Wisconsin) | Caroline Harvey (Wisconsin) | Hannah Clark (Minnesota) | Maria Mikaelyan (St. Cloud State) |
| October 20, 2025 | Alice Sauriol (St. Cloud State) | Ellah Hause (St. Thomas) | Ève Gascon (Minnesota Duluth) | Rae Mayer (Minnesota Duluth) |
| October 27, 2025 | Claire Enright (Wisconsin) | Emma Peschel (Ohio State) | Hannah Clark (Minnesota) | Hilda Svensson (Ohio State) |
| November 3, 2025 | Joy Dunne (Ohio State) | Caroline Harvey (Wisconsin) | Taylor Kressin (Ohio State) | Sophia Villanueva (Minnesota Duluth) |
| November 10, 2025 | Rylee Bartz (St. Thomas) | Jenessa Gazdik (St. Thomas) | Kaitlin Groess (Bemidji State) | – |
| November 17, 2025 | Kirsten Simms (Wisconsin) | Sara Swiderski (Ohio State) | Ève Gascon (Minnesota Duluth) | Hilda Svensson (Ohio State) |
| November 24, 2025 | Joy Dunne (Ohio State) | Caroline Harvey (Wisconsin) | Hailey Hansen (Minnesota State) | Mercury Bischoff (Minnesota State) |
| December 1, 2025 | Lacey Eden (Wisconsin) | Caroline Harvey (Wisconsin) | Emilia Kyrkkö (St. Cloud State) | Hilda Svensson (Ohio State) |
| December 8, 2025 | Jamie Nelson (Minnesota) | Caroline Harvey (Wisconsin) | Ava McNaughton (Wisconsin) | Maria Mikaelyan (St. Cloud State) |
| January 5, 2026 | Abbey Murphy (Minnesota) | Nelli Laitinen (Minnesota) | Hailey MacLeod (Ohio State) | Hilda Svensson (Ohio State) |
| January 12, 2026 | Abbey Murphy (Minnesota) | Joy Dunne (Ohio State) | Ava McNaughton (Wisconsin) | Bella Fanale (Minnesota) |
| January 19, 2026 | Abbey Murphy (Minnesota) | Joy Dunne (Ohio State) | Emilia Kyrkkö (St. Cloud State) | Hilda Svensson (Ohio State) |
| January 26, 2026 | Kirsten Simms (Wisconsin) | Ève Gascon (Minnesota Duluth) | Caroline Harvey (Wisconsin) | Adéla Šapovalivová (Wisconsin) |
| February 2, 2026 | Cassie Hall (Wisconsin) | Vivian Jungels (Wisconsin) | Hailey MacLeod (Ohio State) | Maxine Cimoroni (Ohio State) |
| February 9, 2026 | Lacey Eden (Wisconsin) | Kate Kosobud (Minnesota Duluth) | Hannah Clark (Minnesota) | Mercury Bischoff (Minnesota State) |
| February 16, 2026 | Alice Sauriol (St. Cloud State) | Sydney Bryant (St. Cloud State) | Ève Gascon (Minnesota Duluth) | Maxime Cimoroni (Ohio State) |
| February 23, 2026 | Lacey Eden (Wisconsin) | Emma Peschel (Ohio State) | Ève Gascon (Minnesota Duluth) | Mercury Bischoff (Minnesota State) |

=== All-WCHA Teams ===
| WCHA Team | Position | Player | Team |
|---|---|---|---|
| First Team | F | Abbey Murphy | Minnesota |
| First Team | F | Joy Dunne | Ohio State |
| First Team | F | Lacey Eden | Wisconsin |
| First Team | D | Emma Peschel | Ohio State |
| First Team | D | Caroline Harvey | Wisconsin |
| First Team | G | Ève Gascon | Minnesota Duluth |
| Second Team | F | Jocelyn Amos | Ohio State |
| Second Team | F | Laila Edwards | Wisconsin |
| Second Team | F | Kirsten Simms | Wisconsin |
| Second Team | D | Sydney Morrow | Minnesota |
| Second Team | D | Nelli Laitinen | Minnesota |
| Second Team | G | Ava McNaughton | Wisconsin |
| Third Team | F | Caitlin Kraemer | Minnesota Duluth |
| Third Team | F | Hilda Svensson | Ohio State |
| Third Team | F | Cassie Hall | Ohio State |
| Third Team | D | Mira Jungåker | Ohio State |
| Third Team | D | Vivian Jungels | Wisconsin |
| Third Team | G | Hailey MacLeod | Ohio State |
| All-Rookie Team | F | Bella Fanale | Minnesota |
| All-Rookie Team | F | Mercury Bischoff | Minnesota State) |
| All-Rookie Team | F | Hilda Svensson | Ohio State |
| All-Rookie Team | D | Jenna Raunio | Ohio State |
| All-Rookie Team | D | Sydney Lamb | St. Cloud State |
| All-Rookie Team | G | Taylor Kressin | Ohio State |
