= 2026 WCHA women's ice hockey tournament =

2026 WCHA Women's ice hockey tournament
- 2026 WCHA Final Faceoff logo
- Dates: February 27 – March 7, 2025
- Teams: 8
- Finals site: Lee & Penny Anderson Arena; Saint Paul, Minnesota
- Champions: Ohio State Buckeyes (3rd title)
- Winning coach: Nadine Muzerall (3rd title)
- MVP: Jordan Baxter (Ohio State)
- WCHA Women's Ice Hockey Tournaments

The 2026 WCHA Ice Hockey Tournament was the 27th edition of the WCHA Tournament. It was played between February 27 and March 7, 2026. The final two rounds were hosted by University of St. Thomas at Lee & Penny Anderson Arena, after the first round was played at the home ice of the top four seeds.

Wisconsin entered the tournament as defending champions. Ohio State defeated Wisconsin and earned the conference's automatic bid to the 2026 NCAA Division I women's ice hockey tournament.

== Format ==
The tournament includes all eight teams in the conference. Teams were ranked according to their finish in the conference standings. All quarterfinal games are best two of three and are played at the highest seed's home sites, and starting with the semifinals, single-elimination played at Lee & Penny Anderson Arena. The tournament champion will receive an automatic bid into the 2026 NCAA Division I women's ice hockey tournament.

== Standings ==
2025–26 Western Collegiate Hockey Association standings
	Conference										Overall					
	GP	W	L	T	OTW	OTL	SOW	PTS	GF	GA	GP	W	L	T	GF	GA
#1 Wisconsin †	28	23	3	2	1	1	1	72	138	45	41	35	4	2	213	60
#2 Ohio State *	28	24	4	0	2	0	0	70	117	50	41	36	5	0	181	66
#5 Minnesota	28	18	9	1	1	2	1	57	115	70	39	26	12	1	173	86
#10 Minnesota Duluth	28	15	10	3	2	0	2	48	69	59	38	20	15	3	93	76
#13 Minnesota State	28	9	17	2	2	1	1	29	55	95	38	17	19	2	86	113
St. Cloud State	28	7	19	2	1	4	1	27	74	103	37	12	23	2	83	120
St. Thomas	28	7	20	1	3	5	0	24	49	95	36	12	23	1	81	117
Bemidji State	28	3	24	1	1	0	0	9	38	138	36	6	27	3	58	161
Championship: March 7, 2026 † indicates conference regular season champion; * indicates conference tournament champion Rankings: USCHO.com; updated March 23, 2026

== Bracket ==
Quarterfinals; February 27 – March 1
8	Bemidji State	0	2	—
1	Wisconsin	7	3*	—
5	Minnesota State	0	2**	2
4	Minnesota Duluth	2	1	1
7	St. Thomas	1	1	—
2	Ohio State	5	4	—
6	St. Cloud State	1*	1	1
3	Minnesota	0	4	6

Semifinals; March 5
1	Wisconsin	7
5	Minnesota State	2
2	Ohio State	4
3	Minnesota	0

Championship; March 7
2	Ohio State	2
1	Wisconsin	1

Note: each * denotes one overtime period

== Results ==
=== Quarterfinals ===
==== (8) Bemidji State at (1) Wisconsin ====
February 27, 2026; 6:00 PM	Bemidji State	0–7 (0–3, 0–4, 0–0)	Wisconsin	LaBahn Arena, Madison, Wisconsin; Attendance: 2,273

Kaitlin Groess
Goalies
Ava McNaughton
Referees:
Craig Hedlund
Tony Hoyles
Linesmen:
Brenda Reinen
Brian Jansen

0–1	7:04 – pp – Potter (Harvey, McNaughton)
0–2	8:54 – Hall (Eden, Jones)
0–3	15:42 – pp – Šapovalivová (Simms, Harvey)
0–4	21:22 – Simms
0–5	22:42 – Scannell (Picard, Murphy)
0–6	27:39 – Šapovalivová (Edwards)
0–7	39:53.3 – Edwards (Hall, Harvey)

4 min
Penalties
6 min
20
Shots
51

February 28, 2026; 3:00 PM	Bemidji State	2–3 OT (0–0, 1–2, 1–0); OT: (0–1)	Wisconsin	LaBahn Arena, Madison, Wisconsin; Attendance: 2,273

Ava Hills
Goalies
Ava McNaughton
Referees:
Craig Hedlund
Tony Hoyles
Linesmen:
Brenda Reinen
Brian Jansen

Armstrong (Smith) – 33:25	1–0
	1–1	35:37 – Scannell (Murphy, Picard)
	1–2	39:29 – pp – Šapovalivová (Harvey, Eden)
Smith (Goettl, Bray) – 59:34	2–2
	2–3	61:14 – Edwards (Simms, Enright)

6 min
Penalties
0 min
12
Shots
47

==== (7) St. Thomas at (2) Ohio State ====
February 27, 2026; 6:00 PM	St. Thomas	1–5 (0–1, 0–2, 1–2)	Ohio State	Ohio State University Ice Rink, Columbus, Ohio; Attendance: 674

Julia Minotti
Goalies
Hailey MacLeod
Referees:
Sarma Pone
Gui Bradshaw
Linesmen:
Tyler Iffland
Tim Katrinak

	0–1	14:50 – Swiderski (Peschel, Matthews)
	0–2	35:48 – Swiderski (Dunne, Vanhanen)
	0–3	36:23 – Dunne (Vanhanen, Svensson)
Horton – 43:55	1–3
	1–4	47:18 – Petrie (Swiderski, Disher)
	1–5	59:24.1 – pp – Svensson (Swiderski, Jungåker)

4 min
Penalties
4 min
8
Shots
44

February 28, 2026; 3:00 PM	St. Thomas	1–4 (0–2, 1–1, 0–1)	Ohio State	Ohio State University Ice Rink, Columbus, Ohio; Attendance: 678

Julia Minotti
Maggie Malecha
Goalies
Hailey MacLeod
Referees:
Sarma Pone
Gui Bradshaw
Linesmen:
Tyler Iffland
Tim Katrinak

	0–1	13:27 – Svensson (Peschel, Swiderski)
	0–2	18:11 – Jungåker (Dunne)
	0–3	26:43 – Vanhanen (Jungåker, Svensson)
Brown (Lindsay, Boerger) – 27:18	1–3
	1–4	41:04 – Vanhanen (Jungåker, Svensson)

4 min
Penalties
6 min
20
Shots
31

==== (6) St. Cloud State at (3) Minnesota ====
February 27, 2026; 6:00 PM	St. Cloud State	1–0 OT (0–0, 0–0, 0–0); OT: (1–0)	Minnesota	Ridder Arena, Minneapolis, Minnesota; Attendance: 1,353

Emilia Kyrkkö	Goalies	Hannah Clark	Referees: Duncan Rhyorchuk; Jordan Lee; Linesmen: Sam Jerome; Douglas Durgin
Wolfe (Zimmermann) – 64:50 / 1–0			Referees: Duncan Rhyorchuk; Jordan Lee; Linesmen: Sam Jerome; Douglas Durgin
8 min	Penalties	6 min	Referees: Duncan Rhyorchuk; Jordan Lee; Linesmen: Sam Jerome; Douglas Durgin
20	Shots	42	Referees: Duncan Rhyorchuk; Jordan Lee; Linesmen: Sam Jerome; Douglas Durgin

February 28, 2026; 2:00 PM	St. Cloud State	1–4 (0–1, 0–2, 1–1)	Minnesota	Ridder Arena, Minneapolis, Minnesota; Attendance: 1,408

Emilia Kyrkkö
Goalies
Hannah Clark
Referees:
Duncan Rhyorchuk
Jordan Lee
Linesmen:
Sam Jerome
Douglas Durgin

	0–1	8:15 – Plosová Primerano, Morrow)
	0–2	23:20 – Murphy (Primerano)
	0–3	37:54 – pp – Primerano (Morrow, Nelson)
Mikaelyan (Farrell) – 44:50	1–3
	1–4	59:00 – en – Murphy (Morrow)

10 min
Penalties
8 min
18
Shots
50

March 1, 2026; 3:00 PM	St. Cloud State	1–6 (0–2, 1–3, 0–1)	Minnesota	Ridder Arena, Minneapolis, Minnesota; Attendance: 1,313

Emilia Kyrkkö
Goalies
Hannah Clark
Referees:
Duncan Rhyorchuk
Jordan Lee
Linesmen:
Sam Jerome
Douglas Durgin

	0–1	2:46 – Fanale (Lindsay, Morrow)
	0–2	6:13 – Nelson (Bouveng)
Zimmermann (Jackel) – 21:05	1–2
	1–3	28:26 – Graham Nelson, Laitinen)
	1–4	35:31 – Bouveng (Morrow, Primerano)
	1–5	38:19 – sh – Fanale (Primerano)
	1–6	53:49 – en – Bouveng (Murphy)

6 min
Penalties
8 min
18
Shots
42

==== (5) Minnesota State at (4) Minnesota Duluth ====
February 27, 2026; 2:00 PM	Minnesota State	0–2 (0–0, 0–1, 0–1)	Minnesota Duluth	AMSOIL Arena, Duluth, Minnesota; Attendance: 408

Hailey Hansen	Goalies	Ève Gascon	Referees: Scott Roth; Mike Kaehler; Linesmen: Glendon Seal; Aaron Neville
0–1 / 27:11 – Burr; 0–2 / 47:50 – Cole (Krock, Natt och Dag)			Referees: Scott Roth; Mike Kaehler; Linesmen: Glendon Seal; Aaron Neville
4 min	Penalties	4 min	Referees: Scott Roth; Mike Kaehler; Linesmen: Glendon Seal; Aaron Neville
23	Shots	45	Referees: Scott Roth; Mike Kaehler; Linesmen: Glendon Seal; Aaron Neville

February 28, 2026; 1:00 PM	Minnesota State	2–1 2OT (1–0, 0–1, 0–0); OT: (0–0, 1–0)	Minnesota Duluth	AMSOIL Arena, Duluth, Minnesota; Attendance: 548

Hailey Hansen
Goalies
Ève Gascon
Referees:
Scott Roth
Mike Kaehler
Linesmen:
Glendon Seal
Aaron Neville

Tuttle (Stramel) – 03:05	1–0
	1–1	24:35 – Johansson
Tuttle (Zawoyski, Cichosz) – 95:56	2–1

8 min
Penalties
2 min
29
Shots
58

March 1, 2026; 1:00 PM	Minnesota State	2–1 (1–1, 1–0, 0–0)	Minnesota Duluth	AMSOIL Arena, Duluth, Minnesota; Attendance: 428

Hailey Hansen
Goalies
Ève Gascon
Referees:
Scott Roth
Mike Kaehler
Linesmen:
Glendon Seal
Aaron Neville

Roske (Goldsworthy, Moran) – 03:41	1–0
	1–1	19:21 – Johansson (Kraemer, Burgen)
Guillemette (Moran, Lopez) – 28:28	2–1

2 min
Penalties
2 min
29
Shots
42

=== Semifinals ===
==== (5) Minnesota State at (1) Wisconsin ====
March 5, 2026; 4:02 PM	Minnesota State	2–7 (0–1, 1–4, 1–2)	Wisconsin	Lee & Penny Anderson Arena, Saint Paul, Minnesota; Attendance: 1449

Hailey Hansen
Goalies
Ava McNaughton
Referees:
Sarma Pone
Craig Hedlund
Linesmen:
Sam Jerome
Doug Durgin

	0–1	18:41 – Harvey (Eden, Gorbatenko)
	0–2	24:15 – Simms (Edwards, Hall)
	0–3	25:57 – Gorbatenko (Harvey)
	0–4	28:44 – Šapovalivová (Simms, Harvey)
Stramel (Puppe, Tuttle) – 32:33	1–4
	1–5	34:52 – Simms (Šapovalivová, Enright)
	1–6	40:38 – Gorbatenko (Hall, Eden)
	1–7	46:04 – Scannell (Pieckenhagen)
Goldsworthy (Lopez, Shipley) – 54:10	2–7

0 min
Penalties
0 min
27
Shots
51

==== (3) Minnesota at (2) Ohio State ====
March 5, 2026; 4:02 PM	Minnesota	0–4 (0–1, 0–1, 0–2)	Ohio State	Lee & Penny Anderson Arena, Saint Paul, Minnesota; Attendance: 1687

Clark
Goalies
MacLeod
Referees:
Scott Roth
Mike Kaehler
Linesmen:
Brenda Reinen
Brian Jansen

0–1	7:06 – pp – Matthews (Cimoroni, Peschel)
0–2	30:58 – Malachino (Amos, Peschel)
0–3	46:51 – Amos (Cimoroni)
0–4	59:43 – pp – Matthews (Peschel, Amos)

8 min
Penalties
6 min
22
Shots
33

=== Finals ===
==== (2) Ohio State at (1) Wisconsin ====
March 7, 2026; 2:00 PM	Ohio State	2–1 (0–0, 0–0, 2–1)	Wisconsin	Lee & Penny Anderson Arena, Saint Paul, Minnesota; Attendance: 2,302

Hailey MacLeod
Goalies
Ava McNaughton
Referees:
Duncan Ryhorchuk
Jordan Lee
Linesmen:
Glendon Seal
Aaron Neville

	0–1	49:58 – Eden (Gorbatenko, Edwards)
Svensson (Peschel, Amos) – 54:30	1–1
Baxter (Peschel) – 56:33	2–1

6 min
Penalties
4 min
40
Shots
29

== Tournament Awards ==
=== All-Tournament Team ===
- F: Hilda Svensson (Ohio State)
- F: Sloane Matthews (Ohio State)
- F: Kirsten Simms (Wisconsin)
- D: Caroline Harvey (Wisconsin)
- D: Emma Peschel (Ohio State)
- G: Hailey MacLeod (Ohio State)
