= 2025–26 Ohio State Buckeyes women's ice hockey season =

WCHA tournament champion NCAA Tournament, Runner-Up
- Conference: WCHA
- Home ice: The Ohio State University Ice Rink

Rankings
- USCHO: #1
- USA Hockey: #1

Record
- Overall: 36–5–0
- Conference: 24–4–0
- Home: 17–2–0
- Road: 14–2–0
- Neutral: 5–1–0

Coaches and captains
- Head coach: Nadine Muzerall
- Assistant coaches: James Wisniewski; Kelsey Cline; Logan Davis
- Captain(s): Jocelyn Amos; Emma Peschel
- Alternate captain(s): Joy Dunne; Sloane Matthews

The 2025–26 Ohio State Buckeyes women's ice hockey season represented the Ohio State University during 2025–26 NCAA Division I women's ice hockey season. They were coached by Nadine Muzerall in her tenth season.

== Offseason ==
=== Departing players ===
Player	Position	Class	Destintation
Riley Brengman	D	Senior	Boston Fleet
Jenna Buglioni	F	Senior	Seattle Torrent
Lexington Secreto	G	Senior	Lindenwood
Josie St. Martin	F	Sophomore	Minnesota Duluth
Amanda Thiele	G	Senior	Boston Fleet
Makenna Webster	F	Senior	New York Sirens
Maddi Wheeler	F	Senior	New York Sirens
Kiara Zanon	F	Senior	Toronto Sceptres
Emily Zumwinkle	D	Graduated	

=== Players Drafted ===
Professional Women's Hockey League
Round	Player	Position	Team
1	Jenna Buglioni	F	PWHL Seattle
2	Kiara Zanon	F	Toronto Sceptres
3	Makenna Webster	F	New York Sirens
3	Olivia Mobley	F	Boston Fleet
4	Riley Brengman	D	Boston Fleet
4	Maddi Wheeler	F	New York Sirens
6	Amanda Thiele	G	Boston Fleet

=== Incoming players ===
Player	Position	Class	Previous school
Kassidy Carmichael	F	Incoming freshman	
Maxine Cimoroni	F	Incoming freshman	
Taylor Kressin	G	Incoming freshman	
Kaia Malachino	F	Junior	Colgate
Macy Rasmussen	F	Incoming freshman	
Jenna Raunio	D	Incoming freshman	
Hilda Svensson	F	Incoming freshman	
Sanni Vanhanen	F	Incoming freshman	
Leah Wicks	D	Incoming freshman	

== Standings ==
2025–26 Western Collegiate Hockey Association standings
	Conference										Overall					
	GP	W	L	T	OTW	OTL	SOW	PTS	GF	GA	GP	W	L	T	GF	GA
#1 Wisconsin †	28	23	3	2	1	1	1	72	138	45	41	35	4	2	213	60
#2 Ohio State *	28	24	4	0	2	0	0	70	117	50	41	36	5	0	181	66
#5 Minnesota	28	18	9	1	1	2	1	57	115	70	39	26	12	1	173	86
#10 Minnesota Duluth	28	15	10	3	2	0	2	48	69	59	38	20	15	3	93	76
#13 Minnesota State	28	9	17	2	2	1	1	29	55	95	38	17	19	2	86	113
St. Cloud State	28	7	19	2	1	4	1	27	74	103	37	12	23	2	83	120
St. Thomas	28	7	20	1	3	5	0	24	49	95	36	12	23	1	81	117
Bemidji State	28	3	24	1	1	0	0	9	38	138	36	6	27	3	58	161
Championship: March 7, 2026 † indicates conference regular season champion; * indicates conference tournament champion Rankings: USCHO.com; updated March 23, 2026

== Roster ==
As of September 16, 2025.

No.	Nat.	Player	Class	Pos	Height	DoB	Hometown	Previous team
1	(United States)	Genny Klein	Sophomore	G	5' 6" (1.68 m)	2005-12-20	Apple Valley, Minnesota	Shattuck-St. Mary's
4	(Canada)	Sara Swiderski	Senior	D	5' 9" (1.75 m)	2004-11-11	Langley, British Columbia	Clarkson University
7	(United States)	Emma Peschel (C)	Senior	D	5' 10" (1.78 m)	2004-01-20	Edina, Minnesota	Benilde-St. Margaret's
8	(Sweden)	Hilda Svensson	Freshman	F	5' 6" (1.68 m)	2006-08-24	Oskarshamn, Sweden	Sanda High School
9	(Sweden)	Jenna Raunio	Freshman	D	5' 9" (1.75 m)	2006-09-24	Huskvarna, Sweden	Sanda High School
11	(United States)	Kaia Malachino	Junior	F	5' 8" (1.73 m)	2004-11-02	Brighton, Michigan	Colgate University
12	(United States)	Grace McCoshen	Sophomore	D	5' 6" (1.68 m)	2005-10-08	Northfield, Minnesota	Northfield High School
14	(Sweden)	Mira Jungåker	Sophomore	D	5' 7" (1.7 m)	2005-07-22	Jönköping, Sweden	HV71
15	(United States)	Macy Rasmussen	Freshman	F	5' 4" (1.63 m)	2007-05-17	Orono, Minnesota	Orono High School
16	(United States)	Joy Dunne (A)	Junior	F	5' 11" (1.8 m)	2005-06-13	O'Fallon, Missouri	The Fulton School
17	(Canada)	Jocelyn Amos (C)	Junior	F	5' 7" (1.7 m)	2005-02-24	Ailsa Craig, Ontario	Medway High School
18	(Canada)	Maxine Cimoroni	Freshman	F	5' 9" (1.75 m)	2007-02-27	Toronto, Ontario	Bishop Strachan School
19	(United States)	Jordyn Petrie	Sophomore	F	5' 9" (1.75 m)	2006-01-10	Lincoln, Nebraska	Shattuck-St. Mary's
20	(United States)	Maria Roth	Sophomore	D	5' 9" (1.75 m)	2004-10-12	Dubuque, Iowa	Shattuck-St. Mary's
21	(Finland)	Sanni Vanhanen	Freshman	F	5' 6" (1.68 m)	2005-07-01	Tampere, Finland	Mäkelänrinne High School
22	(United States)	Sloane Matthews (A)	Freshman	F	5' 6" (1.68 m)	2004-07-18	Plymouth, Minnesota	Wayzata High School
23	(Canada)	Leah Wicks	Freshman	D	5' 5" (1.65 m)	2007-08-19	St. John's, Newfoundland and Labrador	Shattuck-St. Mary's
27	(Canada)	Jordan Baxter	Junior	F	5' 7" (1.7 m)	2005-03-14	Coquitlam, British Columbia	North Delta Secondary
28	(Canada)	Brooke Disher	Senior	D	5' 8" (1.73 m)	2004-07-14	Fort St. John, British Columbia	Boston University
29	(United States)	Kassidy Carmichael	Freshman	F	5' 7" (1.7 m)	2006-10-14	Westford, Massachusetts	North American Hockey Academy
30	(United States)	Taylor Kressin	Freshman	G	5' 7" (1.7 m)	2007-01-17	Moorhead, Minnesota	Moorhead High School
35	(Canada)	Hailey MacLeod	Senior	G	6' 0" (1.83 m)	2004-06-12	Abbotsford, British Columbia	Minnesota Duluth

== Schedule and results ==
Date	Time	Opponent^{#}	Rank^{#}	Site	Decision	Result	Attendance	Record	Ref
Regular Season
October 3	6:00 PM	at #7 Colgate*	#2	Class of 1965 Arena • Hamilton, NY	MacLeod	W 5–3	1,003	1–0–0	
October 4	3:00 PM	at #7 Colgate*	#2	Class of 1965 Arena • Hamilton, NY	MacLeod	W 9–4	423	2–0–0	
October 10	6:00 PM	Bemidji State	#2	Ohio State University Ice Rink • Columbus, OH	MacLeod	W 6–0	490	3–0–0 (1–0–0)	
October 11	3:00 PM	Bemidji State	#2	Ohio State University Ice Rink • Columbus, OH	MacLeod	W 2–1	402	4–0–0 (2–0–0)	
October 18	3:00 PM	at #3 Minnesota	#2	Ridder Arena • Minneapolis, MN	MacLeod	W 4–1	2,880	5–0–0 (3–0–0)	
October 19	3:00 PM	at #3 Minnesota	#2	Ridder Arena • Minneapolis, MN	MacLeod	L 3–6	1,642	5–1–0 (3–1–0)	
October 24	6:00 PM	#11 St. Cloud State	#2	Ohio State University Ice Rink • Columbus, OH	MacLeod	W 5–1	461	6–1–0 (4–1–0)	
October 25	3:00 PM	#11 St. Cloud State	#2	Ohio State University Ice Rink • Columbus, OH	Kressin	W 4–2	566	7–1–0 (5–1–0)	
October 31	3:00 PM	at #13 St. Thomas	#2	Lee & Penny Anderson Arena • St. Paul, MN	Kressin	W 3–2 ^{OT}	664	8–1–0 (6–1–0)	
November 1	3:00 PM	at #13 St. Thomas	#2	Lee & Penny Anderson Arena • St. Paul, MN	Kressin	W 8–0	894	9–1–0 (7–1–0)	
November 14	6:00 PM	Minnesota State	#3	Ohio State University Ice Rink • Columbus, OH	Kressin	W 5–2	777	10–1–0 (8–1–0)	
November 15	3:00 PM	Minnesota State	#3	Ohio State University Ice Rink • Columbus, OH	MacLeod	W 7–3	542	11–1–0 (9–1–0)	
November 21	7:00 PM	at #5 Minnesota Duluth	#3	Amsoil Arena • Duluth, MN	MacLeod	W 3–1	1,056	12–1–0 (10–1–0)	
November 22	4:00 PM	at #5 Minnesota Duluth	#3	Amsoil Arena • Duluth, MN	Klein	W 4–1	1,327	13–1–0 (11–1–0)	
November 28	4:00 PM	vs. #10 Clarkson*	#2	MedStar Capitals Iceplex • Arlington, VA (D1 in DC)	MacLeod	W 8–0	882	14–1–0	
November 29	5:00 PM	vs. #12 Colgate*	#2	MedStar Capitals Iceplex • Arlington, VA (D1 in DC)	Klein	W 5–0	1,037	15–1–0	
December 5	6:00 PM	#1 Wisconsin	#2	Ohio State University Ice Rink • Columbus, OH	MacLeod	L 1–2	744	15–2–0 (11–2–0)	
December 6	3:00 PM	#1 Wisconsin	#2	Ohio State University Ice Rink • Columbus, OH	Klein	L 1–6	703	15–3–0 (11–3–0)	
January 2	6:00 PM	#4 Penn State*	#2	Ohio State University Ice Rink • Columbus, OH	MacLeod	W 5–1	682	16–3–0	
January 3	3:00 PM	#4 Penn State*	#2	Ohio State University Ice Rink • Columbus, OH	MacLeod	W 4–1	676	17–3–0	
January 9	7:00 PM	at #15 St. Cloud State	#2	Herb Brooks National Hockey Center • St. Cloud, MN	MacLeod	W 4–0	313	18–3–0 (12–3–0)	
January 10	3:00 PM	at #15 St. Cloud State	#2	Herb Brooks National Hockey Center • St. Cloud, MN	Klein	W 5–1	273	19–3–0 (13–3–0)	
January 16	7:00 PM	at #14 Minnesota State	#2	Mayo Clinic Health System Event Center • Mankato, MN	Klein	W 7–4	320	20–3–0 (14–3–0)	
January 17	4:00 PM	at #14 Minnesota State	#2	Mayo Clinic Health System Event Center • Mankato, MN	Kressin	W 4–1	390	21–3–0 (15–3–0)	
January 23	6:00 PM	St. Thomas	#2	Ohio State University Ice Rink • Columbus, OH	Kressin	W 2–1 ^{OT}	713	22–3–0 (16–3–0)	
January 24	1:00 PM	St. Thomas	#2	Ohio State University Ice Rink • Columbus, OH	MacLeod	W 5–0	719	23–3–0 (17–3–0)	
January 30	6:00 PM	#9 Minnesota Duluth	#2	Ohio State University Ice Rink • Columbus, OH	MacLeod	W 6–2	696	24–3–0 (18–3–0)	
January 31	3:00 PM	at #9 Minnesota Duluth	#2	Ohio State University Ice Rink • Columbus, OH	MacLeod	W 3–1	654	25–3–0 (19–3–0)	
February 6	4:00 PM	at #1 Wisconsin	#2	LaBahn Arena • Madison, WI	MacLeod	W 4–1	2,273	26–3–0 (20–3–0)	
February 7	3:00 PM	at #1 Wisconsin	#2	LaBahn Arena • Madison, WI	MacLeod	L 1–4	2,273	26–4–0 (20–4–0)	
February 13	6:00 PM	#3 Minnesota	#2	Ohio State University Ice Rink • Columbus, OH	MacLeod	W 4–2	707	27–4–0 (21–4–0)	
February 14	3:00 PM	#3 Minnesota	#2	Ohio State University Ice Rink • Columbus, OH	MacLeod	W 3–1	730	28–4–0 (22–4–0)	
February 20	7:00 PM	at Bemidji State	#2	Sanford Center • Bemidji, MN	MacLeod	W 7–1	231	29–4–0 (23–4–0)	
February 21	4:00 PM	at Bemidji State	#2	Sanford Center • Bemidji, MN	MacLeod	W 6–3	271	30–4–0 (24–4–0)	
WCHA Tournament
February 27	6:00 PM	St. Thomas	#2	Ohio State University Ice Rink • Columbus, OH (Quarterfinals)	MacLeod	W 5–1	674	31–4–0	
February 28	3:00 PM	St. Thomas	#2	Ohio State University Ice Rink • Columbus, OH (Quarterfinals)	MacLeod	W 4–1	678	32–4–0	
March 5	8:30 PM	#4 Minnesota	#2	Lee & Penny Anderson Arena • St. Paul, MN (Semifinals)	MacLeod	W 4–0	1,687	33–4–0	
March 7	3:00 PM	#1 Wisconsin	#2	Lee & Penny Anderson Arena • St. Paul, MN (Championship)	MacLeod	W 2–1	2,302	34–4–0	
NCAA Tournament
March 14	6:00 PM	#8 Yale	#1	Ohio State University Ice Rink • Columbus, OH (Quarterfinals)	MacLeod	W 6–1	690	35–4–0	
March 20	4:00 PM	#4 Northeastern	#1	Pegula Ice Arena • University Park, PA (Frozen Four)	MacLeod	W 5–0	1,960	36–4–0	
March 22	4:00 PM	#2 Wisconsin	#1	Pegula Ice Arena • University Park, PA (National Championship)	MacLeod	L 2–3	3,785	36–5–0	
*Non-conference game. ^{#}Rankings from USCHO.com Poll. All times are in Eastern Time. Source:

== Milestones ==
Player	Milestone	Date
Jenna Raunio	First collegiate point	October 3, 2025
Hilda Svensson	First collegiate point	October 3, 2025
Hilda Svensson	First collegiate goal	October 4, 2025
Kassidy Carmichael	First collegiate goal	October 4, 2025
Kassidy Carmichael	First collegiate assist	October 4, 2025
Sanni Vanhanen	First collegiate point	October 4, 2025
Maxine Cimoroni	First collegiate point	October 4, 2025
Maxine Cimoroni	First collegiate goal	October 4, 2025
Macy Rasmussen	First collegiate goal	October 4, 2025
Sanni Vanhanen	First collegiate goal	October 10, 2025
Leah Wicks	First collegiate goal	October 11, 2025
Jenna Raunio	First collegiate goal	October 19, 2025
Leah Wicks	First collegiate assist	October 24, 2025
Maria Roth	First collegiate point	October 24, 2025
Taylor Kressin	First collegiate start	October 25, 2025
Taylor Kressin	First collegiate win	October 25, 2025
