= 2025–26 Wisconsin Badgers women's ice hockey season =

WCHA regular season champion NCAA Tournament, Champion
- Conference: 1 WCHA
- Home ice: LaBahn Arena

Rankings
- USA Today: #1
- USCHO.com: #1

Record
- Overall: 35–4–2
- Conference: 24–3–2
- Home: 16–2–0
- Road: 11–1–2
- Neutral: 8–1–0

Coaches and captains
- Head coach: Mark Johnson
- Assistant coaches: Dan Koch; Jackie Crum; Mark Greenhalgh
- Captain: Caroline Harvey
- Alternate captain(s): Lacey Eden; Laila Edwards; Kelly Gorbatenko; Marianne Picard

The 2025–26 Wisconsin Badgers women's ice hockey season represented the University of Wisconsin–Madison during the 2025–26 NCAA Division I women's ice hockey season. They played their home games at LaBahn Arena and were coached by Mark Johnson in his 23nd season.

On November 30, 2025, the Badgers won the Smashville Women's Collegiate Hockey Showcase in Nashville, Tennessee. Defeating the Stonehill Skyhawks by a 17–2 score. Of note, the 17 goals, scored by 11 different skaters, represents a Badgers single game record.

== Offseason ==
=== Recruiting ===
Player	Position	Nationality	Notes
Nicole Gorbatenko	Forward	United States	Two year attendee of the U18 National Camp for Team USA, sister of Kelly Gorbatenko
Rachel Gorbatenko	Defense	United States	Won a gold medal with Team USA, sister of Kelly Gorbatenko
Mackenzie Jones	Defense	United States	Three year attendee of the U18 National Camp for Team USA
Charlotte Pieckenhagen	Forward	Canada	Won a bronze medal at the 2024 U18 Women's World Championship
Adéla Šapovalivová	Forward	Czechia	Won a silver medal at the 2024 U18 Women's World Championship
Rhyah Stewart	Goalie	Canada	Won a bronze medal at the 2024 U18 Women's World Championship

=== Departing players ===
Player	Position	Nationality	Notes
Sarah Wozniewicz	Forward	Canada	Drafted by the Ottawa Charge
Casey O'Brien	Forward	United States	Drafted by the New York Sirens
Katie Kotlowski	Forward	United States	Graduated
Quinn Kuntz	Goalie	United States	Graduated

=== PWHL Draft ===
Round	Pick	Player	Team
1	3	Casey O'Brien	New York Sirens
3	17	Makenna Webster	New York Sirens
3	21	Sarah Wozniewicz	Ottawa Charge
4	27	Maddi Wheeler	New York Sirens

=== Preseason ===
The Badgers were chosen to win the 2025-26 WCHA regular season title by the league's head coaches. Caroline Harvey was selected as the WCHA Preseason Player of the Year and Adéla Šapovalivová was voted by the coaches as the WCHA Preseason Rookie of the Year. For the preseason All WCHA team, Kirsten Simms and Harvey were chosen.

== Roster ==
As of September 14, 2025.

No.	Nat.	Player	Class	Pos	Height	DoB	Hometown	Previous team
1	(Canada)	Rhyah Stewart	Freshman	G	5' 8" (1.73 m)	2006-11-23	Antigonish, Nova Scotia	West Kent Steamers
2	(United States)	Finley McCarthy	Sophomore	F	5' 9" (1.75 m)	2005-12-09	Whitefish, Montana	Bishop Kearney Selects
3	(United States)	Mackenzie Jones	Freshman	D	5' 11" (1.8 m)	2007-01-18	Andover, Minnesota	Andover High School
4	(United States)	Caroline Harvey (C)	Senior	D	5' 8" (1.73 m)	2002-10-14	Salem, New Hampshire	North American Hockey Academy
5	(United States)	Rachel Gorbatenko	Freshman	F	5' 11" (1.8 m)	2007-03-07	Barrington, Illinois	Chicago Mission
6	(United States)	Lacey Eden (A)	Fifth Year (RS)	F	5' 8" (1.73 m)	2002-05-02	Annapolis, Maryland	Shattuck-Saint Mary's
7	(United States)	Kelly Gorbatenko (A)	Junior	F	5' 11" (1.8 m)	2004-08-05	Barrington, Illinois	Chicago Mission
8	(United States)	Hannah Halverson	Sophomore	F	5' 6" (1.68 m)	2005-10-25	Edina, Minnesota	Edina High School
9	(Canada)	Ava Murphy	Junior	D	5' 9" (1.75 m)	2005-04-15	Kitchener, Ontario	Oakville Hornets
10	(United States)	Laila Edwards (A)	Senior	F	6' 1" (1.85 m)	2004-01-25	Cleveland Heights, Ohio	Selects Academy
11	(United States)	Cassie Hall	Junior	F	5' 6" (1.68 m)	2005-10-18	South Lyon, Michigan	Little Caesars
12	(United States)	McKayla Zilisch	Senior	F	5' 7" (1.7 m)	2004-04-26	Appleton, Wisconsin	Bemidji State
14	(United States)	Maggie Scannell	Sophomore	F	5' 10" (1.78 m)	2006-03-24	Wynantskill, New York	Shattuck-Saint Mary's
15	(United States)	Nicole Gorbatenko	Freshman	F	5' 11" (1.8 m)	2007-07-20	Barrington, Illinois	Chicago Mission
16	(United States)	Claire Enright	Senior (RS)	F	5' 5" (1.65 m)	2004-04-16	Farmington, Minnesota	Lakeville South High School
17	(United States)	Grace Bickett	Sophomore	D	5' 4" (1.63 m)	2006-05-31	Orono, Minnesota	Orono High School
18	(Canada)	Marianne Picard (A)	Fifth Year (RS)	F	5' 6" (1.68 m)	2002-11-13	Repentigny, Quebec	Stanstead College
19	(United States)	Bella Vasseur	Junior	F	5' 7" (1.7 m)	2005-02-15	Oregon, Wisconsin	Bishop Kearney Selects
20	(United States)	Vivian Jungels	Senior	D	5' 7" (1.7 m)	2003-10-08	Edina, Minnesota	Edina High School
21	(Canada)	Emma Venusio	Sophomore	D	5' 6" (1.68 m)	2006-09-21	Toronto, Ontario	Etobicoke
22	(United States)	Laney Potter	Junior	D	5' 11" (1.8 m)	2004-12-05	Cranberry Township, Pennsylvania	Philadelphia Jr. Flyers
24	(Canada)	Charlotte Pieckenhagen	Freshman	F	5' 10" (1.78 m)	2006-01-18	St. Catharines, Ontario	Burlington Jr. Barracudas
26	(Czech Republic)	Adéla Šapovalivová	Freshman	F	5' 4" (1.63 m)	2006-05-17	Beroun, Czechia	MoDo
27	(United States)	Kirsten Simms	Senior	F	5' 6" (1.68 m)	2004-08-31	Plymouth, Michigan	Little Caesars
30	(United States)	Ava McNaughton	Junior	G	6' 0" (1.83 m)	2004-10-27	Seven Fields, Pennsylvania	Bishop Kearney Selects
32	(United States)	Chloe Baker	Senior (RS)	G	5' 6" (1.68 m)	2004-07-02	Hermosa Beach, California	Chicago Mission

== Standings ==
2025–26 Western Collegiate Hockey Association standings
	Conference										Overall					
	GP	W	L	T	OTW	OTL	SOW	PTS	GF	GA	GP	W	L	T	GF	GA
#1 Wisconsin †	28	23	3	2	1	1	1	72	138	45	41	35	4	2	213	60
#2 Ohio State *	28	24	4	0	2	0	0	70	117	50	41	36	5	0	181	66
#5 Minnesota	28	18	9	1	1	2	1	57	115	70	39	26	12	1	173	86
#10 Minnesota Duluth	28	15	10	3	2	0	2	48	69	59	38	20	15	3	93	76
#13 Minnesota State	28	9	17	2	2	1	1	29	55	95	38	17	19	2	86	113
St. Cloud State	28	7	19	2	1	4	1	27	74	103	37	12	23	2	83	120
St. Thomas	28	7	20	1	3	5	0	24	49	95	36	12	23	1	81	117
Bemidji State	28	3	24	1	1	0	0	9	38	138	36	6	27	3	58	161
Championship: March 7, 2026 † indicates conference regular season champion; * indicates conference tournament champion Rankings: USCHO.com; updated March 23, 2026

== Schedule and results ==
Date	Time	Opponent^{#}	Rank^{#}	Site	Decision	Result	Attendance	Record	Ref
Regular Season
September 26	6:02 PM	at Bemidji State	#1	Sanford Center • Bemidji, MN	McNaughton	W 9–2	313	1–0–0 (1–0–0)	
September 27	3:02 PM	at Bemidji State	#1	Sanford Center • Bemidji, MN	McNaughton	W 5–0	218	2–0–0 (2–0–0)	
October 3	7:00 PM	Maine*	#1	LaBahn Arena • Madison, WI	McNaughton	W 5–0	2,273	3–0–0	
October 4	2:00 PM	Maine*	#1	LaBahn Arena • Madison, WI	McNaughton	W 5–0	2,273	4–0–0	
October 11	11:00 AM	#4 Minnesota Duluth	#1	LaBahn Arena • Madison, WI	McNaughton	W 4–3	2,273	5–0–0 (3–0–0)	
October 12	1:00 PM	#4 Minnesota Duluth	#1	LaBahn Arena • Madison, WI	McNaughton	W 4–0	2,273	6–0–0 (4–0–0)	
October 17	11:07 AM	vs. Vermont*	#1	Mohawk Harbor Arena • Albany, NY (Icebreaker Tournament Semifinal)	McNaughton	W 8–1	313	7–0–0	
October 18	2:37 PM	vs. Union*	#1	Mohawk Harbor Arena • Albany, NY (Icebreaker Tournament Championship)	McNaughton	W 4–0	700	8–0–0	
October 25	2:00 PM	Minnesota State	#1	LaBahn Arena • Madison, WI	McNaughton	W 4–0	2,273	9–0–0 (5–0–0)	
October 26	2:00 PM	Minnesota State	#1	LaBahn Arena • Madison, WI	McNaughton	W 8–0	2,273	10–0–0 (6–0–0)	
October 31	6:00 PM	#3 Minnesota	#1	LaBahn Arena • Madison, WI (Rivalry)	McNaughton	L 1–5	2,273	10–1–0 (6–1–0)	
November 1	2:00 PM	#3 Minnesota	#1	LaBahn Arena • Madison, WI (Rivalry)	McNaughton	W 7–2	2,273	11–1–0 (7–1–0)	
November 14	6:00 PM	at #10 St. Cloud State	#1	Herb Brooks National Hockey Center • St. Cloud, MN	McNaughton	W 5–1	273	12–1–0 (8–1–0)	
November 15	2:00 PM	at #10 St. Cloud State	#1	Herb Brooks National Hockey Center • St. Cloud, MN	McNaughton	T 4–4 ^{SOW}	943	12–1–1 (8–1–1)	
November 20	7:00 PM	#15 St. Thomas	#1	LaBahn Arena • Madison, WI	McNaughton	W 8–0	2,273	13–1–1 (9–1–1)	
November 21	7:00 PM	#15 St. Thomas	#1	LaBahn Arena • Madison, WI	McNaughton	W 4–3 ^{OT}	2,273	14–1–1 (10–1–1)	
November 29	2:00 PM	vs. Mercyhurst*	#1	Ford Ice Center • Nashville, TN (Smashville Women's Collegiate Hockey Showcase)	McNaughton	W 5–1	530	15–1–1	
November 30	11:00 AM	vs. Stonehill*	#1	Ford Ice Center • Nashville, TN (Smashville Women's Collegiate Hockey Showcase)	Stewart	W 17–2	300	16–1–1	
December 5	5:00 PM	at #2 Ohio State	#1	Ohio State University Ice Rink • Columbus, OH	McNaughton	W 2–1	744	17–1–1 (11–1–1)	
December 6	2:00 PM	at #2 Ohio State	#1	Ohio State University Ice Rink • Columbus, OH	McNaughton	W 6–1	703	18–1–1 (12–1–1)	
January 9	3:02 PM	at #8 Minnesota Duluth	#1	Amsoil Arena • Duluth, MN	McNaughton	T 1–1 ^{SOL}	1,795	18–1–2 (12–1–2)	
January 10	2:02 PM	at #8 Minnesota Duluth	#1	Amsoil Arena • Duluth, MN	McNaughton	W 5–1	1,807	19–1–2 (13–1–2)	
January 16	2:00 PM	at St. Thomas	#1	Lee and Penny Anderson Arena • St. Paul, MN	McNaughton	W 5–1	802	20–1–2 (14–1–2)	
January 17	2:00 PM	at St. Thomas	#1	Lee and Penny Anderson Arena • St. Paul, MN	McNaughton	W 5–1	1,343	21–1–2 (15–1–2)	
January 24	1:00 PM	Bemidji State	#1	LaBahn Arena • Madison, WI	McNaughton	W 10–3	22,73	22–1–2 (16–1–2)	
January 25	11:00 AM	Bemidji State	#1	LaBahn Arena • Madison, WI	McNaughton	W 6–1	2,273	23–1–2 (17–1–2)	
January 30	6:00 PM	at #3 Minnesota	#1	Ridder Arena • Minneapolis, MN	Stewart	L 2–3 ^{OT}	2,994	23–2–2 (17–2–2)	
January 31	2:00 PM	at #3 Minnesota	#1	Ridder Arena • Minneapolis, MN	Stewart	W 6–1	3,159	24–2–2 (18–2–2)	
February 6	3:00 PM	#2 Ohio State	#1	LaBahn Arena • Madison, WI	Stewart	L 1–4	2,273	24–3–2 (18–3–2)	
February 7	2:00 PM	#2 Ohio State	#1	LaBahn Arena • Madison, WI	Stewart	W 4–1	2,273	25–3–2 (19–3–2)	
February 13	3:00 PM	at Minnesota State	#1	Mayo Clinic Health System Event Center • Mankato, MN	Stewart	W 4–1	355	26–3–2 (20–3–2)	
February 14	2:00 PM	at Minnesota State	#1	Mayo Clinic Health System Event Center • Mankato, MN	Stewart	W 5–1	407	27–3–2 (21–3–2)	
February 20	1:00 PM	St. Cloud State	#1	LaBahn Arena • Madison, WI	Stewart	W 9–2	2,273	28–3–2 (22–3–2)	
February 21	11:00 AM	St. Cloud State	#1	LaBahn Arena • Madison, WI	Stewart	W 4–2	2,273	29–3–2 (23–3–2)	
WCHA Tournament
February 27	6:00 PM	Bemidji State	#1	LaBahn Arena • Madison, WI (Quarterfinal)	McNaughton	W 7–0	2,273	30–3–2	
February 28	3:00 PM	Bemidji State	#1	LaBahn Arena • Madison, WI (Quarterfinal)	McNaughton	W 3–2 ^{OT}	2,273	31–3–2	
March 5	4:00 PM	Minnesota State	#1	Lee and Penny Anderson Arena • St. Paul, MN (Semifinal)	McNaughton	W 7–2	1,449	32–3–2	
March 7	2:00 PM	#2 Ohio State	#1	Lee and Penny Anderson Arena • St. Paul, MN (Championship)	McNaughton	L 1–2	1,449	32–4–2	
NCAA Tournament
March 14	1:00 PM	#7 Quinnipiac	#2	LaBahn Arena • Madison, WI (Quarterfinal)	McNaughton	W 6–0	2,400	33–4–2	
March 20	6:30 PM	#3 Penn State	#2	Pegula Ice Arena • University Park, PA (Frozen Four)	McNaughton	W 4–3 ^{OT}	5,176	34–4–2	
March 22	3:00 PM	#1 Ohio State	#2	Pegula Ice Arena • University Park, PA (National Championship)	McNaughton	W 3–2	3,785	35–4–2	
*Non-conference game. ^{#}Rankings from USCHO.com Poll. All times are in Central Time. Source:

== Milestones ==
Player	Milestone	Date
Maggie Scannell	First collegiate hat trick	September 26, 2025
Charlotte Pieckenhagen	First collegiate goal	September 26, 2025
Adéla Šapovalivová	First collegiate assist	September 26, 2025
Adéla Šapovalivová	First collegiate goal	September 27, 2025
Lacey Eden	100th career assist	October 17, 2025
Caroline Harvey	150th career point	October 18, 2025
Caroline Harvey	Most goals by a Wisconsin defender	November 14, 2025
Kirsten Simms	200th career point	November 15, 2025
Grace Bickett	First collegiate goal	November 20, 2025
Caroline Harvey	Most points by a WCHA defender	November 29, 2025
Lacey Eden	200th career point	November 30, 2025
Laila Edwards	100th career assist	November 30, 2025
Rhyah Stewart	First collegiate start	November 30, 2025
Rhyah Stewart	First career win	November 30, 2025
McKayla Zilisch	First goal with Wisconsin	November 30, 2025
McKayla Zilisch	First collegiate hat trick	November 30, 2025
Team	Most goals scored in team history	November 30, 2025
Caroline Harvey	First collegiate hat trick	January 24, 2026
Caroline Harvey	First collegiate six-point game	January 24, 2026
Kirsten Simms	First collegiate six-point game	January 24, 2026
Cassie Hall	100th career point	February 13, 2026
Lacey Eden	100th career goal	February 21, 2026
Kelly Gorbatenko	First collegiate hat trick	February 21, 2026
Team	Most hat tricks in a single season (seven players)	February 21, 2026
Team	WCHA Regular Season Title	February 22, 2026
Mackenzie Jones	First collegiate goal	February 22, 2026
Kelly Gorbatenko	100th career point	March 14, 2026
Mark Johnson	700th career win	March 14, 2026
Laila Edwards	12th goal in NCAA tournament (most by a Badger)	March 20, 2026
Kirsten Simms	100th career goal	March 20, 2026
Caroline Harvey	200th career point	March 20, 2026

== Winter Olympics ==
The following five current Badgers were selected to represent their nations at the 2026 Winter Olympic Games, taking place from February 5 to February 19, 2026:

Player	Position	National team
Laila Edwards	D	United States
Caroline Harvey	D	United States
Ava McNaughton	G	United States
Kirsten Simms	F	United States
Adéla Šapovalivová	F	Czechia
