= 2025 NCAA Division I women's ice hockey tournament =

NCAA women's ice hockey postseason tournament

2025 NCAA National Collegiate Women's ice hockey tournament
- Teams: 11
- Finals site: Ridder Arena, Minneapolis, Minnesota
- Champions: Wisconsin Badgers (8th title)
- Runner-up: Ohio State Buckeyes (4th title game)
- Semifinalists: Cornell Big Red (5th Frozen Four); Minnesota Golden Gophers (16th Frozen Four)
- Winning coach: Mark Johnson (8th title)
- MOP: Kirsten Simms (Wisconsin)

The 2025 NCAA National Collegiate women's ice hockey tournament was a single-elimination tournament by eleven schools to determine the national champion of women's NCAA Division I college ice hockey. This was the fourth year the tournament features an expanded field of 11 teams. The first round and quarterfinals were played on the campuses of the top 4 seeded teams on March 13 and 15, 2025, while the Frozen Four was played on March 21 and 23, 2025 at Ridder Arena in Minneapolis, Minnesota. Sacred Heart made their first NCAA tournament in school history while Boston University returned to the tournament for the first time in ten years. The Wisconsin Badgers met the Ohio State Buckeyes for the third consecutive year in the final, and Wisconsin defeated Ohio State 4–3 in overtime to win their record eighth national championship.

== Qualifying teams ==
2025 Qualifying Teams
WCHA, ECAC, Hockey East, AHA, NEWHA

In the fourth year under this qualification format, the winners of all five Division I conference tournaments will receive automatic berths to the NCAA tournament. The other six teams will be selected at-large. The top five teams are seeded.

Seed	School	Conference	Record	Berth type	Appearance	Last bid
1	Wisconsin	WCHA	35–1–2	Tournament champion	19th	2024
2	Ohio State	WCHA	27–7–3	At-large bid	6th	2024
3	Cornell	ECAC	24–4–5	Tournament champion	10th	2024
4	Minnesota	WCHA	28–11–1	At-large bid	22nd	2024
5	Colgate	ECAC	30–8–0	At-large bid	6th	2024
	Boston University	Hockey East	24–11–2	Tournament champion	7th	2015
	Clarkson	ECAC	24–12–2	At-large bid	13th	2024
	Minnesota Duluth	WCHA	21–14–2	At-large bid	16th	2024
	Penn State	AHA	31–5–1	Tournament champion	3rd	2024
	Sacred Heart	NEWHA	21–14–3	Tournament champion	1st	Never
	St. Lawrence	ECAC	21–11–5	At-large bid	11th	2024

=== Bids by state ===
Bids	State	School(s)
4	New York	Clarkson, Colgate, Cornell, St. Lawrence
2	Minnesota	Minnesota, Minnesota Duluth
1	Connecticut	Sacred Heart
1	Massachusetts	Boston University
1	Ohio	Ohio State
1	Pennsylvania	Penn State
1	Wisconsin	Wisconsin

== Bracket ==
First Round; March 13
Boston University	1
Clarkson	3
Sacred Heart	1
Minnesota Duluth	6
St. Lawrence	4
Penn State	1

National Quarterfinals; March 15
Clarkson	1
1	Wisconsin	4
5	Colgate	2
4	Minnesota	3
Minnesota Duluth	0
3	Cornell	1
St. Lawrence	1
2	Ohio State	6

National Semifinals; March 21
1	Wisconsin	6
4	Minnesota	2
3	Cornell	2
2	Ohio State	4

National Championship; March 23
1	Wisconsin	4*
2	Ohio State	3

Note: each * denotes one overtime period

== Results ==
=== First Round ===
==== St. Lawrence vs. Penn State ====
March 13, 2025; 7:00 pm	St. Lawrence	4–1 (3–0, 0–0, 1–1)	Penn State	Ohio State University Ice Rink; Attendance: 365

Emma-Sofie Nordström
Goalies
Katie DeSa
Referees:
Katie Guay
Dmitrii Antipin
Linesmen:
Evan Cookie
Andrew Kirk

14:19 – Abby Hustler (Hehl, Segedi)	1–0
14:34 – Kennedy Wilson	2–0
18:43 – pp – Abby Hustler (Segedi, Marchand)	3–0
	3–1	48:36 – pp – Kendall Butze (Janecke, Roberts)
59:18.1 – en – Kristina Bahl	4–1

8 min
Penalties
6 min
27
Shots
33

==== Sacred Heart vs. Minnesota Duluth ====
March 13, 2025; 7:00 pm	Sacred Heart	1–6 (0–1, 0–3, 1–2)	Minnesota Duluth	Lynah Rink; Attendance: 245

Carly Greene
Goalies
Ève Gascon
Referees:
Scott Prim
Paul Maciejewski
Linesmen:
Marc Silva
Chris Hunter

	0–1	13:06 – Clara Van Wieren (Wallin)
	0–2	26:43 – Danielle Burgen (Kraemer)
	0–3	39:40.9 – Olivia Mobley (Wallin)
	0–4	39:56.8 – Burgen (Kraemer, O'Brien)
	0–5	48:37 – Grace Sadura (Lawry, Davis)
50:09 – Kate Helgeson (Limke, Bennetts)	1–5
	1–6	59:24.7 – Mobley (Millwater, Van Wieren)

4 min
Penalties
10 min
12
Shots
58

==== Boston University vs. Clarkson ====
March 13, 2025; 8:02 pm	Boston University	1–3 (0–2, 0–0, 1–1)	Clarkson	LaBahn Arena; Attendance: 611

Callie Shanahan
Goalies
Holly Gruber
Referees:
Sarma Pone
Gui Bradshaw
Linesmen:
Doug Durgin
Sam Jerome

	0–1	5:09 – Anne Cherkowski (Fess, Proulx)
	0–2	5:40 – pp – Rhea Hicks (Catterall, Cherkowski)
55:59 – Lindsay Bochna (Shaunessy, Law)	1–2
	1–3	59:25.0 – en – Catterall (Gosling)

8 min
Penalties
4 min
18
Shots
30

=== Quarterfinals ===
==== Clarkson vs. (1) Wisconsin ====
March 15, 2025; 2:00 pm	Clarkson	1–4 (1–0, 0–2, 0–2)	Wisconsin	LaBahn Arena; Attendance: 2,421

Holly Gruber
Goalies
Ava McNaughton
Referees:
Nathan Shemo
Chris Binkley
Linesmen:
Seamus Andrews
Andy Zawada

4:59 – pp – Nicole Gosling (Cherkowski, Winn)	1–0
	1–1	31:36 – Ava Murphy (O'Brien, Simms)
	1–2	37:37 – Kelly Gorbatenko (Hall, Potter)
	1–3	55:24 – pp – Laila Edwards (Simms, Eden)
	1–4	59:28.0 – sh, en – Eden (O'Brien, Venusio)

8 min
Penalties
6 min
20
Shots
38

==== (5) Colgate vs. (4) Minnesota ====
March 15, 2025; 2:00 pm	Colgate	2–3 (0–1, 0–2, 2–0)	Minnesota	Ridder Arena; Attendance: 1,482

Hannah Murphy
Goalies
Hannah Clark
Referees:
Scott Roth
Michael Kaehler
Linesmen:
Coby Munson
Sarah Buckner

	0–1	5:40 – pp – Abbey Murphy (Primerano, Clark)
	0–2	25:18 – pp – Abbey Murphy (Huber, Mlýnková)
	0–3	30:06 – Sydney Morrow (Bouveng, Primerano)
42:26 – pp – Elyssa Biederman (Malachino, Pais)	1–3
51:00 – Avery Pickering (Stewart, Malachino)	2–3

8 min
Penalties
4 min
26
Shots
44

==== Minnesota Duluth vs. (3) Cornell ====
March 15, 2025; 4:00 pm	Minnesota Duluth	0–1 (0–0, 0–0, 0–1)	Cornell	Lynah Rink; Attendance: 3,135

Ève Gascon	Goalies	Annelies Bergmann	Referees: Tom Lynch; Will O'Malley; Linesmen: Glendon Seal; Aaron Neville
0–1 / 43:24 – Alyssa Regalado (Rud, Adam)			Referees: Tom Lynch; Will O'Malley; Linesmen: Glendon Seal; Aaron Neville
2 min	Penalties	4 min	Referees: Tom Lynch; Will O'Malley; Linesmen: Glendon Seal; Aaron Neville
28	Shots	21	Referees: Tom Lynch; Will O'Malley; Linesmen: Glendon Seal; Aaron Neville

==== St. Lawrence vs. (2) Ohio State ====
March 15, 2025; 6:02 pm	St. Lawrence	1–6 (1–2, 0–0, 0–4)	Ohio State	Ohio State University Ice Rink; Attendance: 711

Emma-Sofie Nordström
Goalies
Amanda Thiele
Referees:
Kelly Cooke
Amanda Tassoni
Linesmen:
Abbey Torres
Jennifer Cameron

6:26 – pp – Aly McLeod (Jefferies, Côté)	1–0
	1–1	13:37 – Sloane Matthews (Webster)
	1–2	18:46 – Joy Dunne (Buglioni, Brengman)
	1–3	51:36 – Jocelyn Amos (Dunne)
	1–4	53:56 – Makenna Webster (Dunne, Peschel)
	1–5	57:38 – en – Joy Dunne (Amos, McCoshen)
	1–6	59:40.3 – Jordyn Petrie (St. Martin, Baxter)

6 min
Penalties
17 min
14
Shots
49

=== Semifinals ===
==== (3) Cornell vs. (2) Ohio State ====
March 21, 2025; 5:00 pm	Cornell	2–4 (0–2, 2–0, 0–2)	Ohio State	Ridder Arena; Attendance: 3,487

Annelies Bergmann
Goalies
Amanda Thiele
Referees:
Chris Binkley
Nate Shemo
Linesmen:
Andy Zawada
Seamus Andrew

	0–1	2:24 – Webster (Dunne)
	0–2	6:37 – Disher (Buglioni, Matthews)
Delianedis (Schiff, Dwyer) – 33:14	1–2
Jockims (Grober) – 34:22	2–2
	2–3	43:37 – Dunne (Webster, Jungåker)
	2–4	47:22 – Dunne (Amos, Webster)

6 min
Penalties
6 min
29
Shots
42

==== (4) Minnesota vs. (1) Wisconsin ====
March 21, 2025; 8:30 pm	Minnesota	2–6 (1–1, 1–3, 0–2)	Wisconsin	Ridder Arena; Attendance: 3,487

Hannah Clark
Goalies
Ava McNaughton
Referees:
Tom Lynch
Will O'Malley
Linesmen:
Sarah Buckner
Colby Munson

Hemp (Lindsay, Kreisz) – 14:14	1–0
	1–1	17:15 - sh – Edwards (O'Brien, Harvey)
	1–2	22:52 – Harvey (O'Brien, Simms)
	1–3	29:42 – Kirsten Simms (Eden, Jungels)
30:27 – Bouveng (Laitinen) – 30:27	2–3
	2–4	39:58.0 – Casey O'Brien (Potter)
	2–5	44:22 – Edwards (Gorbatenko, Harvey)
	2–6	58:41 - en – Edwards (Enright, Harvey)

9 min
Penalties
6 min
23
Shots
18

=== Championship ===
==== (2) Ohio State vs. (1) Wisconsin ====
March 23, 2025; 4:00 pm	Ohio State	3–4 OT (2–1, 1–1, 0–1, 0–1)	Wisconsin	Ridder Arena; Attendance: 3,100

Amanda Thiele
Goalies
Ava McNaughton
Referees:
Kelly Cooke
Amanda Tassoni
Linesmen:
Abbey Torres
Jenny Cameron-Ward

Dunne – sh – 8:22	1–0
	1–1	8:34 - pp – Edwards (Eden)
Matthews – 14:44	2–1
Peschel (Amos, Webster) – 20:10	3–1
	3–2	25:27 – Harvey (Simms, Edwards)
	3–3	59:41.1 - pn – Simms
	3–4	62:49 – Simms (Eden, Murphy)

6 min
Penalties
2 min
23
Shots
35

=== See also ===
- NCAA women's ice hockey tournament
- 2025 NCAA Division I men's ice hockey tournament

== Tournament awards ==
=== All-Tournament Team ===
- G: Ava McNaughton, Wisconsin
- D: Caroline Harvey, Wisconsin
- D: Emma Peschel, Ohio State
- F: Joy Dunne: Ohio State
- F: Laila Edwards, Wisconsin
- F: Kirsten Simms*, Wisconsin

* Most Outstanding Player
