= 2026 NCAA Division I women's ice hockey tournament =

NCAA women's ice hockey postseason tournament

2026 NCAA National Collegiate Women's ice hockey tournament
- Teams: 11
- Finals site: Pegula Ice Arena, University Park, Pennsylvania
- Champions: Wisconsin Badgers (9th title)
- Runner-up: Ohio State Buckeyes (5th title game)
- Semifinalists: Penn State Nittany Lions (1st Frozen Four); Northeastern Huskies (4th Frozen Four)
- Winning coach: Mark Johnson (9th title)
- MOP: Ava McNaughton (Wisconsin)

The 2026 NCAA National Collegiate women's ice hockey tournament was a single-elimination tournament by eleven schools to help determine the national champion of women's NCAA Division I college ice hockey for the 2025–26 season. This was the fifth year the tournament features an expanded field of 11 teams. The first round and quarterfinals were played on the campuses of the top 4 seeded teams on March 12 and March 14, 2026, while the Frozen Four is set to be played on March 20 and 22, 2026 at Pegula Ice Arena in College Township, Pennsylvania with a University Park mailing address. Franklin Pierce made their first tournament appearance in school history while Penn State reached the Frozen Four for the first time ever. For the fourth consecutive year, the Wisconsin Badgers met the Ohio State Buckeyes for the national championship.

During the National Semifinal between Penn State and Wisconsin, a new women's Frozen Four attendance record was set at 5,176.

== Qualifying teams ==
2026 Qualifying Teams
WCHA, ECAC, Hockey East, AHA, NEWHA

In the fifth year under this qualification format, the winners of all five Division I conference tournaments will receive automatic berths to the NCAA tournament. The other six teams will be selected at-large. The top five teams are also seeded.

| Seed | School | Conference | Record | Berth type | Appearance | Last bid |
|---|---|---|---|---|---|---|
| 1 | Ohio State | WCHA | 34–4–0 | Tournament champion | 8th | 2025 |
| 2 | Wisconsin | WCHA | 32–4–2 | At-large bid | 20th | 2025 |
| 3 | Penn State | AHA | 32–5–0 | Tournament champion | 4th | 2025 |
| 4 | Minnesota | WCHA | 26–11–1 | At-large bid | 23rd | 2025 |
| 5 | Northeastern | Hockey East | 28–8–1 | At-large bid | 8th | 2023 |
| | Connecticut | Hockey East | 27–8–2 | Tournament champion | 2nd | 2024 |
| | Franklin Pierce | NEWHA | 23–11–2 | Tournament champion | 1st | Never |
| | Minnesota Duluth | WCHA | 20–14–3 | At-large bid | 17th | 2025 |
| | Princeton | ECAC | 23–10–0 | At-large bid | 5th | 2020 |
| | Quinnipiac | ECAC | 28–8–3 | Tournament champion | 5th | 2023 |
| | Yale | ECAC | 25–9–0 | At-large bid | 3rd | 2023 |

=== Bids by state ===
| Bids | State | School(s) |
|---|---|---|
| 3 | Connecticut | UConn, Yale, Quinnipiac |
| 2 | Minnesota | Minnesota, Minnesota Duluth |
| 1 | New Hampshire | Franklin Pierce |
| 1 | Massachusetts | Northeastern |
| 1 | New Jersey | Princeton |
| 1 | Ohio | Ohio State |
| 1 | Pennsylvania | Penn State |
| 1 | Wisconsin | Wisconsin |

== Bracket ==
First Round; March 12
Minnesota Duluth | 0
Yale | 1
Princeton | 1
UConn | 4
Franklin Pierce | 0
Quinnipiac | 4

National Quarterfinals; March 14
Yale | 1
1 | Ohio State | 6
5 | Northeastern | 4
4 | Minnesota | 2
UConn | 0
3 | Penn State | 3
Quinnipiac | 0
2 | Wisconsin | 6

National Semifinals; March 20
1 | Ohio State | 5
5 | Northeastern | 0
3 | Penn State | 3
2 | Wisconsin | 4*

National Championship; March 22
1 | Ohio State | 2
2 | Wisconsin | 3

Note: * denotes one overtime period

== Results ==
=== First Round ===
==== Franklin Pierce vs. Quinnipiac ====
| March 12, 2026; 7:00 pm | Franklin Pierce | 0–4 (0–0, 0–2, 0–2) | Quinnipiac | LaBahn Arena; Attendance: 560 |

Jill Hertl
Goalies
Felicia Frank
Referees:
Sarma Pone
Duncan Ryhorchuk
Linesmen:
Douglas Durgin
Sam Jerome

| 0–1 | 35:50 – Jarvis (Lamarche) |
| 0–2 | 39:31.8 – Prier (Lamarche, Jarvis) |
| 0–3 | 52:16 – Cormier (Johnson, D'Ottavio) |
| 0–4 | 54:51 – Frenette (Cormier, Lopata) |

2 min
Penalties
6 min
29
Shots
53

==== Princeton vs. UConn ====
| March 12, 2026; 7:00 pm | Princeton | 1–4 (0–1, 1–1, 0–2) | UConn | Pegula Ice Arena; Attendance: 326 |

Uma Corniea
Goalies
Tia Chan
Referees:
Gui Bradshaw
Jordan Lee
Linesmen:
Aaron Neville
Glendon Seal

| | 0–1 | 16:11 – Eryou (Allard, Murdoch) |
| Sorokan (Dimatos, Kuehl) – 27:48 | 1–1 |
| | 1–2 | 32:04 – Josifovic (Murdoch) |
| | 1–3 | 47:04 – Josifovic (Serdachny, Murdoch) |
| | 1–4 | 57:52 – en – Pellerin (Woodworth) |

2 min
Penalties
4 min
42
Shots
30

==== Minnesota Duluth vs. Yale ====
| March 12, 2026; 6:00 pm | Minnesota Duluth | 0–1 (0–0, 0–1, 0–0) | Yale | Ohio State University Ice Rink; Attendance: 285 |

| Ève Gascon | Goalies | Samson Frey | Referees: Christopher Binkley; Mackenzie Gaydosh; Linesmen: Andy Zawada; Ashley Johnston |
| 0–1 / 36:15 – Boyle (Levering, Stainton) | | | Referees: Christopher Binkley; Mackenzie Gaydosh; Linesmen: Andy Zawada; Ashley Johnston |
| 8 min | Penalties | 0 min | Referees: Christopher Binkley; Mackenzie Gaydosh; Linesmen: Andy Zawada; Ashley Johnston |
| 37 | Shots | 37 | Referees: Christopher Binkley; Mackenzie Gaydosh; Linesmen: Andy Zawada; Ashley Johnston |

=== Quarterfinals ===
==== Yale at (1) Ohio State ====
| March 14, 2026; 6:00 pm | Yale | 1-6 (1–1, 0–3, 0-2) | Ohio State | Ohio State University Ice Rink; Attendance: 690 |

Samson Frey
Goalies
Hailey MacLeod
Referees:
Kelly Cooke
Dmitrii Antipin
Linesmen:
Andrew Kirk
Charlie Tremblay

| | 0–1 | 6:01 – Amos (Dunne, Peschel) |
| Boyle (Peters) – 11:25 | 1–1 |
| | 1–2 | 23:39 – Malachino (Amos) |
| | 1–3 | 26:36 – Matthews (Jungåker, Amos) |
| | 1–4 | 34:53 – Baxter (Matthews, Vanhanen) |
| | 1–5 | 41:57 – Matthews (Vanhanen) |
| | 1–6 | 58:35 – Amos (Carmichael, Cimoroni) |

10 min
Penalties
6 min
23
Shots
49

==== (5) Northeastern at (4) Minnesota ====
| March 14, 2026; 3:00 pm | Northeastern | 4–2 (3–0, 1–0, 0–2) | Minnesota | Ridder Arena; Attendance: 2,266 |

Lisa Jönsson
Goalies
Hannah Clark
Layla Hemp
Referees:
Amanda Tassoni
Paul Maciejewski
Linesmen:
Sarah Buckner
Coby Munson

| Caron – 5:03 | 1–0 |
| Zablocki (Caron, Baechler) – 8:53 | 2–0 |
| Langlois (Baechler, Lalonde) – pp – 14:31 | 3–0 |
| Jackson (Lalonde, Compton) – 32:21 | 4–0 |
| | 4–1 | 51:10 – pp – Murphy (Bouveng, Morrow) |
| | 4–2 | 58:29 – pp – Murphy (Morrow, Primerano) |

8 min
Penalties
2 min
24
Shots
47

==== UConn at (3) Penn State ====
| March 14, 2026; 2:00 pm | UConn | 0–3 (0–1, 0–0, 0–2) | Penn State | Pegula Ice Arena; Attendance: 1,615 |

Tia Chan
Goalies
Katie DeSa
Referees:
William O'Malley
Tom Lynch
Linesmen:
Marc Silva
Robert Lemnah

| 0–1 | 1:40 – Fantin (Hall) |
| 0–2 | 53:30 – Janecke |
| 0–3 | 59:43 – en – Stonehouse |

8 min
Penalties
4 min
36
Shots
42

==== Quinnipiac at (2) Wisconsin ====
| March 12, 2026; 2:00 pm | Quinnipiac | 0–6 (0–2, 0–2, 0–2) | Wisconsin | LaBahn Arena; Attendance: 2,400 |

Felicia Frank
Goalies
Ava McNaughton
Referees:
Steven Saul
Laura Schmidlein
Linesmen:
Heidi Niskanen
Jennifer Cameron-Ward

| 0–1 | 2:33 – K. Gorbatenko (Eden, Hall) |
| 0–2 | 17:29 – pp – Simms (Edwards, Harvey) |
| 0–3 | 21:18 – Šapovalivová (Simms, Murphy) |
| 0–4 | 37:10 – K. Gorbatenko (Hall) |
| 0–5 | 53:28 – sh – Eden (Potter) |
| 0–6 | 57:09 – en – K. Gorbatenko (Jones, Venusio) |

11 min
Penalties
6 min
17
Shots
51

=== Semifinals ===
==== (5) Northeastern vs. (1) Ohio State ====
| March 20, 2026; 4:00 pm | Northeastern | 0–5 (0–4, 0–0, 0–1) | Ohio State | Pegula Ice Arena; Attendance: 1,960 |

Lisa Jönsson
Goalies
Hailey MacLeod
Referees:
William O'Malley
Tom Lynch
Linesmen:
Marc Silva
Robert Lemnah

| 0–1 | 10:14 – Dunne (Amos, Jungåker) |
| 0–2 | 16:33 – Malachino |
| 0–3 | 17:36 – Vanhanen (Svensson) |
| 0–4 | 19:59.4 – Peschel (Dunne, Matthews) |
| 0–5 | 42:31 – Swiderski (Baxter, Malachino) |

6 min
Penalties
8 min
15
Shots
42

==== (3) Penn State vs. (2) Wisconsin ====
| March 20, 2026; 7:30 pm | Penn State | 3–4 OT (2–1, 0–2, 1–0); OT: (0–1) | Wisconsin | Pegula Ice Arena; Attendance: 5,176 |

Katie DeSa
Goalies
Ava McNaughton
Referees:
Kelly Cooke
Dmitrii Antipin
Linesmen:
Andrew Kirk
Charlie Tremblay

| Janecke (Roberts, Butze) – pp – 1:52 | 1–0 |
| | 1–1 | 4:31 – Edwards (Simms, Šapovalivová) |
| Stonehouse (Christian, Keller) – pp – 7:53 | 2–1 |
| | 2–2 | 28:11 – pp – Edwards (Simms, Šapovalivová) |
| | 2–3 | 36:09 – Šapovalivová (Eden, K. Gorbatenko) |
| Janecke (Hall) – 55:07 | 3–3 |
| | 3–4 | 60:50 – pp – Simms (Harvey, Edwards) |

8 min
Penalties
12 min
25
Shots
35

=== Championship ===
==== (2) Wisconsin vs. (1) Ohio State ====
| March 22, 2026; 4:00 pm | Wisconsin | 3–2 (2–0, 0–0, 1–2) | Ohio State | Pegula Ice Arena; Attendance: 3,785 |

Ava McNaughton
Goalies
Hailey MacLeod
Referees:
Amanda Tassoni
Paul Maciejewski
Linesmen:
Colby Munson
Sarah Bucker

| K. Gorbatenko (Šapovalivová, Eden) – 1:18 | 1–0 |
| Potter (K. Gorbatenko, Šapovalivová) – 7:34 | 2–0 |
| | 2–1 | 43:32 – Carmichael (Jungåker, Svensson) |
| | 2–2 | 45:34 – Amos (Peschel, Dunne) |
| Enright (Picard, Harvey) – 53:42 | 3–2 |

2 min
Penalties
12 min
34
Shots
36

== Tournament awards ==
=== All-Tournament Team ===
- G: Ava McNaughton*, Wisconsin
- D: Caroline Harvey, Wisconsin
- D: Emma Peschel, Ohio State
- F: Laila Edwards, Wisconsin
- F: Tessa Janecke: Penn State
- F: Kirsten Simms, Wisconsin

* Most Outstanding Player
