= NCAA Division I women's ice hockey All-Tournament team =

NCAA Division I women's ice hockey All-Tournament team is an honor bestowed at the conclusion of the NCAA women's ice hockey tournament to the players judged to have performed the best during the championship. The team is currently composed of three forwards, two defensemen and one goaltender with additional players named in the event of a tie. Voting for the honor was conducted by the head coaches of each member team once the tournament has completed and any player regardless of their team's finish is eligible. The All-Tournament Team began being awarded after the first championship in 2001.

== All-Tournament teams ==
=== 2000s ===
2001
Player	Pos	Team
Tuula Puputti	G	Minnesota Duluth
Isabelle Chartrand	D	St. Lawrence
Brittny Ralph	D	Minnesota Duluth
Amanda Sargeant	F	St. Lawrence
Maria Rooth	F	Minnesota Duluth
Tammy Shewchuk	F	Harvard

2002
Player	Pos	Team
Tania Pinelli	G	Niagara
Larissa Luther	D	Minnesota Duluth
Meredith Ostrander	D	Brown
Kelly Stephens	F	Minnesota
Joanne Eustace	F	Minnesota Duluth
Kristy Zamora	F	Brown

2003
Player	Pos	Team
Amy Ferguson	G	Dartmouth
Angela Ruggiero	D	Harvard
Jenny Potter	F	Minnesota Duluth
Hanne Sikiö	F	Minnesota Duluth
Julie Chu	F	Harvard
Caroline Ouellette	F	Minnesota Duluth

2004
Player	Pos	Team
Jody Horak	G	Minnesota
Allie Sanchez	D	Minnesota
Angela Ruggiero	D	Harvard
Kelly Stephens	F	Minnesota
Natalie Darwitz	F	Minnesota
Krissy Wendell	F	Minnesota

2005
Player	Pos	Team
Ali Boe	G	Harvard
Caitlin Cahow	D	Harvard
Lyndsay Wall	D	Minnesota
Sarah Vaillancourt	F	Harvard
Natalie Darwitz	F	Minnesota
Krissy Wendell	F	Minnesota

2006
Player	Pos	Team
Jessie Vetter	G	Wisconsin
Bobbi-Jo Slusar	D	Wisconsin
Ashley Albrecht	D	Minnesota
Jinelle Zaugg	F	Wisconsin
Bobbi Ross	F	Minnesota
Jennifer Hitchcock	F	New Hampshire

2007
Player	Pos	Team
Jessie Vetter	G	Wisconsin
Bobbi-Jo Slusar	D	Wisconsin
Meaghan Mikkelson	D	Wisconsin
Jinelle Zaugg	F	Wisconsin
Jessica Koizumi	F	Minnesota Duluth
Sara Bauer	F	Wisconsin

2008
Player	Pos	Team
Kim Martin	G	Minnesota Duluth
Myriam Trépanier	D	Minnesota Duluth
Heidi Pelttari	D	Minnesota Duluth
Laura Fridfinnson	F	Minnesota Duluth
Sara O’Toole	F	Minnesota Duluth
Erika Lawler	F	Wisconsin

2009
Player	Pos	Team
Jessie Vetter	G	Wisconsin
Alycia Matthews	D	Wisconsin
Malee Windmeier	D	Wisconsin
Meghan Agosta	F	Mercyhurst
Hilary Knight	F	Wisconsin
Erika Lawler	F	Wisconsin

=== 2010s ===
2010
Player	Pos	Team
Amanda Mazzotta	G	Cornell
Laura Fortino	D	Cornell
Lauriane Rougeau	D	Cornell
Emmanuelle Blais	F	Minnesota Duluth
Laura Fridfinnson	F	Minnesota Duluth
Jessica Wong	F	Minnesota Duluth

2011
Player	Pos	Team
Molly Schaus	G	Boston College
Catherine Ward	D	Boston University
Alev Kelter	D	Wisconsin
Brooke Ammerman	F	Wisconsin
Meghan Duggan	F	Wisconsin
Hilary Knight	F	Wisconsin
Carolyne Prevost	F	Wisconsin

2012
Player	Pos	Team
Noora Räty	G	Minnesota
Megan Bozek	D	Minnesota
Brooke Ammerman	D	Wisconsin
Sarah Erickson	F	Minnesota
Amanda Kessel	F	Minnesota
Carolyne Prevost	F	Wisconsin

2013
Player	Pos	Team
Noora Räty	G	Minnesota
Megan Bozek	D	Minnesota
Hannah Brandt	D	Minnesota
Marie-Philip Poulin	F	Boston University
Amanda Kessel	F	Minnesota
Milica McMillen	F	Minnesota

2014
Player	Pos	Team
Erica Howe	G	Clarkson
Baylee Gillanders	D	Minnesota
Renata Fast	D	Clarkson
Rachel Bona	F	Minnesota
Maryanne Menefee	F	Minnesota
Jamie Lee Rattray	F	Clarkson

2015
Player	Pos	Team
Amanda Leveille	G	Minnesota
Megan Wolfe	D	Minnesota
Sarah Edney	D	Harvard
Hannah Brandt	F	Minnesota
Maryanne Menefee	F	Minnesota
Dani Cameranesi	F	Minnesota

2016
Player	Pos	Team
Amanda Leveille	G	Minnesota
Lee Stecklein	D	Minnesota
Megan Keller	D	Boston College
Sarah Potomak	F	Minnesota
Amanda Kessel	F	Minnesota
Haley Skarupa	F	Boston College

2017
Player	Pos	Team
Ann-Renée Desbiens	G	Wisconsin
Mellissa Channell	D	Wisconsin
Savannah Harmon	D	Clarkson
Geneviève Bannon	F	Clarkson
Cayley Mercer	F	Clarkson
Annie Pankowski	F	Wisconsin

2018
Player	Pos	Team
Shea Tiley	G	Clarkson
Savannah Harmon	D	Clarkson
Olivia Zafuto	D	Colgate
Loren Gabel	F	Clarkson
Élizabeth Giguère	F	Clarkson
Breanne Wilson-Bennett	F	Colgate

2019
Player	Pos	Team
Kristen Campbell	G	Wisconsin
Maddie Rolfes	D	Wisconsin
Mekenzie Steffen	D	Wisconsin
Annie Pankowski	F	Wisconsin
Abby Roque	F	Wisconsin
Nicole Schammel	F	Minnesota

=== 2020s ===
2020
Not awarded due to COVID-19 pandemic

2021
Player	Pos	Team
Aerin Frankel	G	Northeastern
Ashton Bell	D	Minnesota Duluth
Skylar Fontaine	D	Northeastern
Alina Müller	F	Northeastern
Caitlin Schneider	F	Wisconsin
Makenna Webster	F	Wisconsin

2022
Player	Pos	Team
Emma Söderberg	G	Minnesota Duluth
Sophie Jaques	D	Ohio State
Skylar Fontaine	D	Northeastern
Kenzie Hauswirth	F	Ohio State
Paetyn Levis	F	Ohio State
Naomi Rogge	F	Minnesota Duluth

2023
Player	Pos	Team
Cami Kronish	G	Wisconsin
Sophie Jaques	D	Ohio State
Caroline Harvey	D	Wisconsin
Laila Edwards	F	Wisconsin
Kirsten Simms	F	Wisconsin
Jesse Compher	F	Wisconsin

2024
Player	Pos	Team
Raygan Kirk	G	Ohio State
Cayla Barnes	D	Ohio State
Caroline Harvey	D	Wisconsin
Joy Dunne	F	Ohio State
Kirsten Simms	F	Wisconsin
Makenna Webster	F	Ohio State

2025
Player	Pos	
Ava McNaughton	G	Wisconsin
Caroline Harvey	D	Wisconsin
Emma Peschel	D	Ohio State
Joy Dunne	F	Ohio State
Laila Edwards	F	Wisconsin
Kirsten Simms	F	Wisconsin

2026
Player	Pos	Team
Ava McNaughton	G	Wisconsin
Caroline Harvey	D	Wisconsin
Emma Peschel	D	Ohio State
Laila Edwards	F	Wisconsin
Tessa Janecke	F	Penn State
Kirsten Simms	F	Wisconsin

=== All-Tournament team players by school ===
School	Recipients
Wisconsin	46
Minnesota	33
Minnesota Duluth	20
Ohio State	11
Clarkson	10
Harvard	8
Northeastern	4
Boston College	3
Cornell	3
Boston University	2
Brown	2
Colgate	2
St. Lawrence	2
Dartmouth	1
Mercyhurst	1
New Hampshire	1
Niagara	1
Penn State	1

=== Multiple appearances ===
Player	Appearances
Caroline Harvey	4
Kirsten Simms	4
Laila Edwards	3
Amanda Kessel	3
Jessie Vetter	3
Multiple players tied	2
