= Jenna Raunio =

Swedish ice hockey player (born 2006)

- Born: 24 September 2006 (age 20) Jönköping, Sweden
- Height: 174 cm (5 ft 9 in)
- Weight: 70 kg (154 lb; 11 st 0 lb)
- Position: Defence
- Shoots: Right
- WCHA team Former teams: Ohio State; HV71
- National team: Sweden
- Playing career: 2020–present
Medal record
World Championship
Bronze medal – third place	2026 Denmark

Jenna Raunio (born 24 September 2006) is a Swedish ice hockey defenceman for the Ohio State Buckeyes of the National Collegiate Athletic Association (NCAA) and member of Sweden women's national ice hockey team.

== Playing career ==
Raunio made her SDHL debut for HV71 during the 2020–21 season at 14 years old, where she recorded one assist in 22 games. On 2 December 2021, she signed a three-year contract extension with HV71. During the 2021–22 season, she recorded six goals and eight assists in 34 games. During the 2022–23 season, she recorded three goals and seven assists in 24 games. During the 2023–24 season, she recorded eight assists in 16 games, after missing several months to begin the season due to suffering concussion symptoms. During the 2024–25 season, she recorded five goals and 11 assists in 33 games.

Raunio is committed to play college ice hockey at Ohio State during the 2025–26 season.

== International play ==
Raunio represented Sweden at the 2022 IIHF World Women's U18 Championship where she recorded two goals and one assist in six games. She again represented Sweden at the 2023 IIHF World Women's U18 Championship where she recorded one goal and three assists in five games and won a silver medal. She again represented Sweden at the 2024 IIHF World Women's U18 Championship, where she recorded one goal and four assists in five games.

She made her senior national team debut for Sweden during the 2026 Winter Olympics qualification. During the final qualification game against Denmark, she scored two goals to help Sweden qualify for the 2026 Winter Olympics.

On 25 March 2025, she was named to Sweden's roster for the 2025 IIHF Women's World Championship.

On 12 January 2026, she was named to Sweden's roster to compete at the 2026 Winter Olympics.

On 20 October 2026, she was selected to represent Sweden at the 2026 IIHF Women's World Championship. She recorded two assists in five games to help Sweden win their first IIHF Women's World Championship medal since 2007.

== Career statistics ==
=== Regular season and playoffs ===
			Regular season					Playoffs
Season	Team	League	GP	G	A	Pts	PIM	GP	G	A	Pts	PIM
2020–21	HV71	SDHL	22	0	1	1	2	5	0	0	0	0
2021–22	HV71	SDHL	34	6	8	14	22	6	0	0	0	6
2022–23	HV71	SDHL	24	3	7	10	6	—	—	—	—	—
2023–24	HV71	SDHL	16	0	8	8	20	2	0	3	3	0
2024–25	HV71	SDHL	33	5	11	16	36	2	0	2	2	0
SDHL totals			129	14	35	49	98	15	0	5	5	6

=== International ===
Year	Team	Event	Result	GP	G	A	Pts	PIM
2022	Sweden	U18	4th	6	2	1	3	8
2023	Sweden	U18	2nd place, silver medalist(s)	5	1	3	4	4
2024	Sweden	U18	5th	5	1	4	5	0
2025	Sweden	WC	6th	6	1	2	3	4
2026	Sweden	OG	4th	6	0	4	4	0
2026	Sweden	WC	3rd place, bronze medalist(s)	5	0	2	2	0
Junior totals				16	4	8	12	12
Senior totals				17	1	8	9	4
