= Lacey Eden =

American ice hockey player (born 2002)

- Eden playing for the Wisconsin Badgers in 2026
- Born: May 2, 2002 (age 24) Annapolis, Maryland
- Height: 5 ft 8 in (173 cm)
- Weight: 150 lb (68 kg; 10 st 10 lb)
- Position: Forward
- Shoots: Right
- PWHL team Former teams: Vegas Vanguards; Wisconsin Badgers
- National team: United States
- Playing career: 2020–present
Medal record
World Championships
| Gold medal – first place | 2023 Canada |
| Gold medal – first place | 2025 Czechia |
| Gold medal – first place | 2026 Denmark |
| Silver medal – second place | 2021 Canada |
| Silver medal – second place | 2022 Denmark |
| Silver medal – second place | 2024 United States |
World U18 Championship
| Gold medal – first place | 2020 Slovakia |
| Silver medal – second place | 2019 Japan |

Lacey Annapolis Eden (born May 2, 2002) is an American professional ice hockey forward for the Vegas Vanguards in the Professional Women’s Hockey League (PWHL). She previously played for the University of Wisconsin and is a member of the United States women's national ice hockey team. She won four NCAA championships with Wisconsin (2021, 2023, 2025, 2026), the most by any player in program history.

== Early life ==
Born in Annapolis, Maryland to Karen and Bill Eden, Lacey was raised with her older brother, Liam. Eden started playing hockey at age four. Her interest in hockey was sparked by Liam, and the two played with the Navy Youth Hockey Association as children. She was valedictorian at Indian Creek Middle School.

Eden attended Archbishop Spalding High School for her freshman and sophomore years. As a freshman, she was a multi-sport athlete, playing JV soccer and running cross country in the fall, skating on both the boys and girls ice hockey teams in winter, and competing on the varsity lacrosse team in spring. She led the hockey team to its first-ever mid-Atlantic Girls High School Hockey League championship by scoring four goals in a 4–3 victory. She won the Interscholastic Athletic Association of Maryland A Conference cross country championship as a freshman as well as the 3,000 and 1,500 meters at the Amateur Athletic Union National Indoor Track Championships. She also finished third in the 1,500 and sixth in the 3,000 in the USA Track and Field National Championships.

Eden transferred to Shattuck-Saint Mary's in Minnesota for her junior and senior years. At Shattuck-St. Mary's, she scored 75 goals and had 100 assists over two seasons in 96 games.

== Playing career ==
=== College ===
Eden was originally committed to play for the Princeton Tigers before their 2020–21 season was canceled due the COVID-19 pandemic. She continued her offseason training at home and applying to the University of Wisconsin–Madison in December. She officially began her collegiate career for Wisconsin in January of the 2020–21 season. During her first month with the team, she tied for the league lead among rookies in goals (three), assists (four) and points (seven), shots on goal (23), and plus/minus (+6). She was subsequently named the WCHA Rookie of the Month for the month of February 2021. She finished the season with eight goals and seven assists in 15 games and helped the Badgers win the national championship. Following an outstanding season she was named to the USCHO All-Rookie Team.

On September 18, 2024, she was named an alternate captain for the 2024–25 season. As a senior, she recorded 24 goals and 34 assists in 41 games, and helped lead Wisconsin to their eighth national championship. During the 2025–26 season, as a graduate student, she led the nation in scoring with 29 goals and 48 assists in 41 games and helped lead Wisconsin to their ninth national championship. This was her fourth national championship at Wisconsin, the most by any player in program history.

=== Professional ===
On June 17, 2026, Eden was drafted fifth overall by the Vegas Vanguards in the 2026 PWHL draft, making her the second entry draft player in franchise history. On October 5, 2026, the team announced that she had signed a two-year standard player agreement through the 2027–28 season.

== International play ==
=== Junior ===
Eden represented the United States at the 2019 IIHF World Women's U18 Championship where she won a silver medal. She again represented the United States at the 2020 IIHF World Women's U18 Championship, where she led the team in scoring with five points and won a gold medal.

=== Senior ===
Eden made her international debut for the United States at the 2021 IIHF Women's World Championship in Calgary, Alberta. The United States won a silver medal after falling to Canada 3–2 in overtime in the gold medal game. She returned to the roster for the 2022 IIHF Women's World Championship in Herning and Frederikshavn, Denmark, where the United States won another silver medal, losing to Canada 2–1 in the gold medal game.

Eden won her first World Championship gold medal at the 2023 IIHF Women's World Championship in Brampton, Ontario, where the United States defeated Canada 6–3 in the gold medal game. She competed at the 2024 IIHF Women's World Championship in Utica, New York, winning a silver medal after the United States fell to Canada 6–5 in overtime in the gold medal game. Eden scored a goal and added an assist in the quarterfinal victory over Japan and assisted on Caroline Harvey's game-tying goal with 5:02 remaining in regulation of the gold medal game. The United States won a silver medal after falling to Canada 6–5 in overtime.

Eden won her second gold medal at the 2025 IIHF Women's World Championship in České Budějovice, Czechia, her fifth World Championship appearance. She scored in the quarterfinal victory over Germany, and the United States defeated Canada 4–3 in overtime in the gold medal game.

== Personal life ==
According to her USA Hockey profile, Eden's favorite postgame meal is Pesto pasta with chicken and arugula.

== Career statistics ==
=== Regular season and playoffs ===
| | | | Regular season | | | | | Playoffs |
| Season | Team | League | GP | G | A | Pts | PIM | GP | G | A | Pts | PIM |
|---|---|---|---|---|---|---|---|---|---|---|---|---|
| 2020–21 | University of Wisconsin | WCHA | 15 | 8 | 7 | 15 | 6 | — | — | — | — | — |
| 2022–23 | University of Wisconsin | WCHA | 40 | 17 | 23 | 40 | 0 | — | — | — | — | — |
| 2023–24 | University of Wisconsin | WCHA | 41 | 27 | 29 | 56 | 15 | — | — | — | — | — |
| 2024–25 | University of Wisconsin | WCHA | 41 | 24 | 34 | 58 | 6 | — | — | — | — | — |
| NCAA totals | | | 137 | 76 | 93 | 169 | 27 | — | — | — | — | — |

=== International ===
| Year | Team | Event | Result | GP | G | A | Pts | PIM |
|---|---|---|---|---|---|---|---|---|
| 2019 | United States | U18 | 2nd place, silver medalist(s) | 5 | 1 | 1 | 2 | 0 |
| 2020 | United States | U18 | 1st place, gold medalist(s) | 5 | 2 | 3 | 5 | 4 |
| 2021 | United States | WC | 2nd place, silver medalist(s) | 5 | 0 | 2 | 2 | 0 |
| 2022 | United States | WC | 2nd place, silver medalist(s) | 7 | 2 | 2 | 4 | 0 |
| 2023 | United States | WC | 1st place, gold medalist(s) | 7 | 1 | 0 | 1 | 4 |
| 2024 | United States | WC | 2nd place, silver medalist(s) | 7 | 1 | 2 | 3 | 0 |
| 2025 | United States | WC | 1st place, gold medalist(s) | 6 | 1 | 1 | 2 | 2 |
| Junior totals | | | | 10 | 3 | 4 | 6 | 4 |
| Senior totals | | | | 32 | 5 | 7 | 12 | 6 |
