= Ava McNaughton =

American ice hockey player (born 2004)

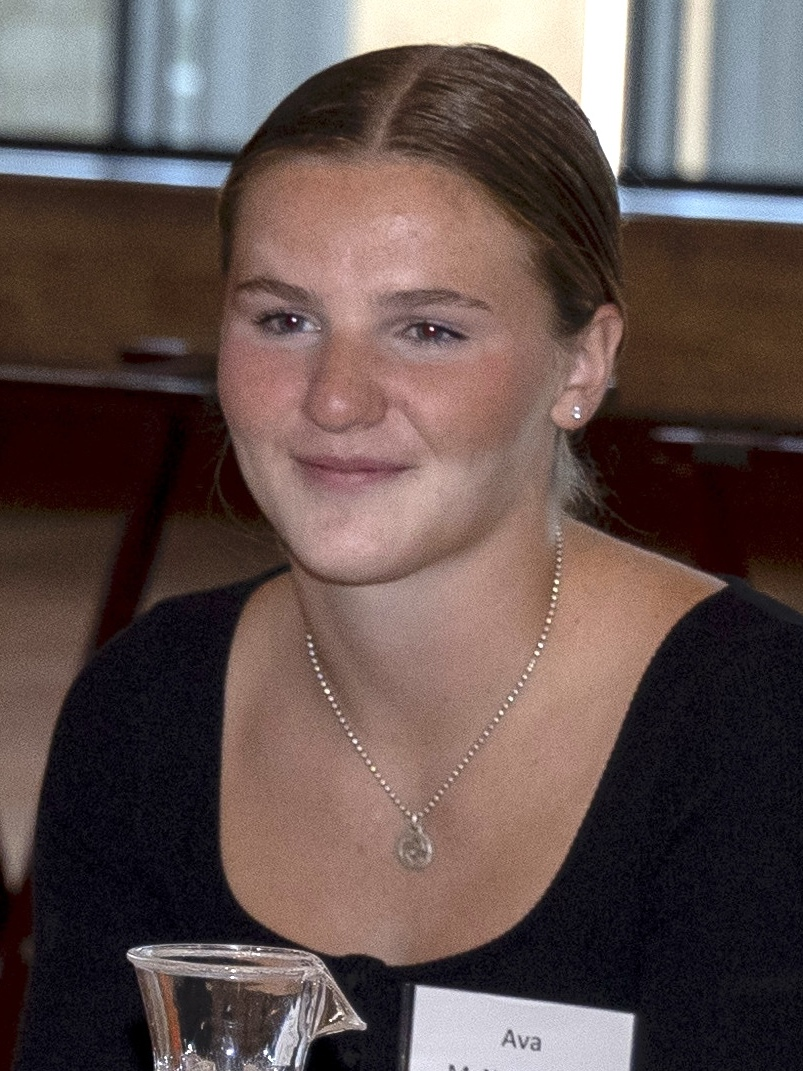
- McNaughton in 2024
- Born: October 27, 2004 (age 21) Wexford, Pennsylvania, U.S.
- Height: 6 ft 0 in (183 cm)
- Weight: 181 lb (82 kg; 12 st 13 lb)
- Position: Goaltender
- Catches: Left
- WCHA team: Wisconsin Badgers
- National team: United States
- Playing career: 2023–present
Medal record
Olympic Games
Gold medal – first place	2026 Milano Cortina	Team

Ava McNaughton (born October 27, 2004) is an American college ice hockey goaltender for Wisconsin and member of the United States women's national ice hockey team. She won consecutive NCAA championships with Wisconsin in 2025 and 2026, was named Most Outstanding Player in 2026. She was also named the National Goalie of the Year in 2025.

== Early life ==
At age six, McNaughton became interested in hockey while watching women's ice hockey at the 2010 Winter Olympics. She and her sister Emily were taking figure skating lessons at the time, but McNaughton immediately wanted to switch to hockey. She began playing goaltender in youth hockey, volunteering for the position whenever possible.

== Playing career ==
=== College ===
McNaughton began her collegiate career for Wisconsin during the 2023–24 season. During her freshman year she appeared in 23 games, and posted a 20–3–0 record with five shutouts, a 1.45 goals against average (GAA) and .936 save percentage. She was named the WCHA Rookie of the Month in October 2023, after she posted a perfect 4–0–0 record, with a .953 save percentage and two shutouts. She was one of only three WCHA netminders to post a GAA below 1.00 during the month. Her .953 save percentage ranked third in the league and was the best among all freshmen. She was again named the WCHA Rookie of the Month in February 2024, after she posted a perfect 4–0–0, with a 1.00 GAA and .955 save percentage. She had wins against ranked opponents, including No. 10 St. Cloud State, No. 5 Minnesota and No. 1 Ohio State. She became only the second goalie this season to shutout Minnesota. Her two shutouts were also for the league lead during the month. She helped Wisconsin win the 2024 WCHA women's ice hockey tournament and was named to the WCHA Final Faceoff All-Tournament team.

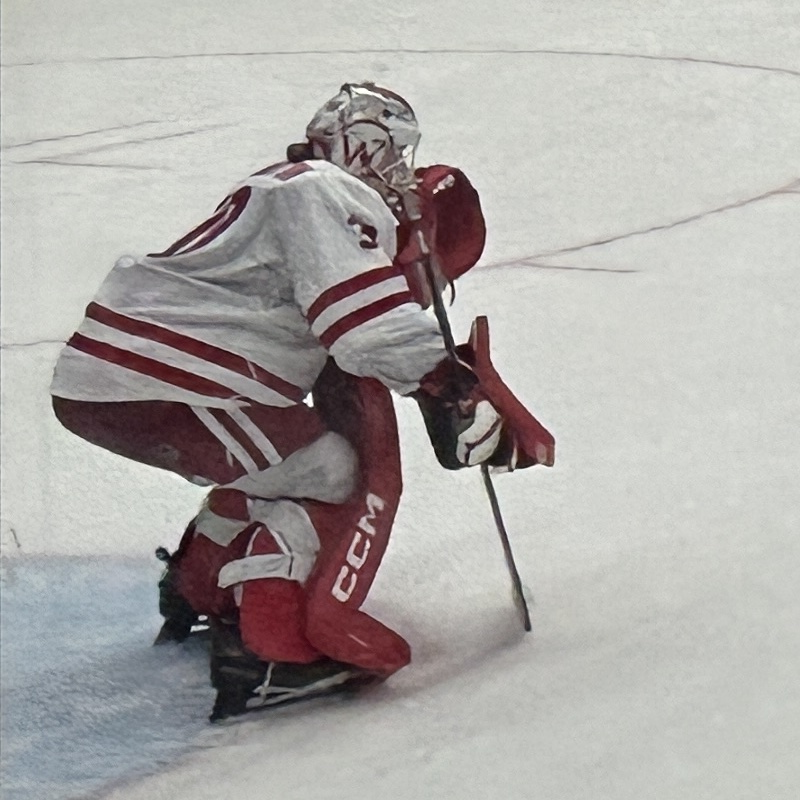
McNaughton in goal for Wisconsin in October 2024

During the 2024–25 season, in her sophomore year, she posted a 36–1–2 record with eight shutouts, a 1.25 GAA and .944 save percentage. She led the nation in GAA and ranked second in save percentage. She was named the WCHA Goaltender of the Month in October 2024, after she led the league with eight wins and three shutouts. She ranked second in the WCHA with a 1.05 GAA and .948 save percentage. She was named the WCHA Goaltender of the Month and Hockey Commissioners Association Co-National Goaltender of the Month in November 2024. During the month she recorded six wins and two shutouts, with a 1.20 GAA and .956 save percentage. She was named the WCHA Goaltender of the Month in January 2025, after she posted a 7–0–2 record, with a 1.45 GAA and .938 save percentage. She was named the WCHA Goaltender of the Month in February 2025, after she recorded five wins. Her five wins were tied for the by any goalie in the month and three of her wins came against ranked opponents. She ranked second in the WCHA with a 1.00 GAA and .948 save percentage. She won the WCHA goaltending championship after she posted a 1.28 GAA and .945 save percentage in conference games. Following the season she was named to the Second Team All-WCHA and a finalist for the WCHA Goaltender of the Year. She was named the Women's Hockey Commissioners Association National Goalie of the Year. During the 2025 NCAA Division I women's ice hockey tournament, she helped lead Wisconsin to their eighth national championship and was named to the NCAA All-Tournament team. Her 36 wins were the most by a goaltender in program history.

During the 2024–25 season, in her junior year, she posted a 26–2–2 record with eight shutouts, a 1.27 GAA and .941 save percentage. During conference play, she led all WCHA goalies with a 1.29 GAA, and ranked second with a save percentage of .939, trailing only Ève Gascon. Following the season she was named to the Second Team All-WCHA for the second consecutive year. During the 2026 NCAA tournament championship game against Ohio State she recorded 34 saves and helped Wisconsin win their ninth NCAA championship in program history. She was subsequently named tournament Most Outstanding Player.

== International play ==
Medal record

Representing United States

Ice hockey

World Championships
Gold medal – first place	2025 Czechia	

World U18 Championships
Silver medal – second place	2022 United States	

=== Junior ===
McNaughton represented the United States at the 2022 IIHF U18 Women's World Championship and won a silver medal. She appeared in one game against Finland, and recorded 11 saves for the shutout win in her first IIHF U18 Women's World Championship game.

=== Senior ===
On March 5, 2025, McNaughton was named to the roster for the United States at the 2025 IIHF Women's World Championship in České Budějovice, Czechia. The United States won the gold medal, defeating Canada 4–3 in overtime in the championship game.

On January 2, 2026, McNaughton was named to the U.S. roster to compete at the 2026 Winter Olympics.

== Personal life ==
McNaughton was born to Gretchen and Robert McNaughton, and has an older sister, Emily.

== Career statistics ==
=== Regular season and playoffs ===
Season	Team	League	GP	W	L	T	MIN	GA	SO	GAA	SV%
2023–24	University of Wisconsin	WCHA	25	20	3	0	1,362	33	5	1.45	.936
2024–25	University of Wisconsin	WCHA	39	36	1	2	2,217	46	8	1.25	.944
NCAA totals			64	56	4	2	3,579	79	13	1.30	.942

=== International ===
Year	Team	Event	Result	GP	W	L	T	MIN	GA	SO	GAA	SV%
2022	United States	U18	2nd place, silver medalist(s)	1	1	0	0	60	0	1	0.00	1.000
2025	United States	WC	1st place, gold medalist(s)	1	1	0	0	29	0	0	0.00	1.000
2026	United States	OG	1st place, gold medalist(s)	1	1	0	0	2	0	0	0.00	1.000
Junior totals				1	1	0	0	60	0	1	0.00	1.000
Senior totals				2	2	0	0	31	0	0	0.00	1.000
