= Jamie Nelson (ice hockey) =

American ice hockey player (born 2002)

- Born: June 13, 2002 (age 24) Andover, Minnesota, U.S.
- Height: 5 ft 8 in (173 cm)
- Position: Forward
- Shoots: Left
- PWHL team: Toronto Sceptres
- Playing career: 2026–present

Jamie Nelson (born June 13, 2002) is an American professional ice hockey forward for the Toronto Sceptres of the Professional Women's Hockey League (PWHL).

== Playing career ==
=== College ===
From 2020 to 2025, she played college ice hockey for Minnesota State. She played her final season of college ice hockey with Minnesota.

=== Professional ===
On June 17, 2026, Nelson was drafted in the second round, 20th overall, by the Toronto Sceptres in the 2026 PWHL Draft.

== Awards and honors ==
- WCHA Rookie of the Year (2020-21)
