= Vivian Jungels =

- Jungels playing for the Wisconsin Badgers in 2025
- Born: October 8, 2003 (age 23) Edina, MN, U.S.
- Height: 5 ft 7 in (170 cm)
- Position: Defense
- Shoots: Left
- PWHL team: Ottawa Charge
- Playing career: 2026–present

Vivian Jungels is a professional ice hockey defenseman for the Ottawa Charge of the Professional Women's Hockey League (PWHL). She played her college ice hockey at Wisconsin Badgers women's ice hockey.

== Playing career ==
=== College ===
During the 2025-26 season, Jungels appeared in 39 games for Wisconsin, winning the NCAA Frozen Four.

=== Professional ===
On June 17, 2026, Jungels was drafted eleventh overall by the Ottawa Charge in the 2026 PWHL Draft.

== Awards and honors ==
- WCHA Scholar Athlete (2023–24, 2024–25)
- Big Ten Distinguished Scholar (2023–24, 2024–25)
