= Brooke Disher =

Canadian ice hockey player (born 2004)

- Born: July 14, 2004 (age 21) Fort St. John, British Columbia, Canada
- Height: 5 ft 8 in (173 cm)
- Position: Defence
- Shoots: Left
- PWHL team: Toronto Sceptres
- Playing career: 2022–present

Brooke Disher (born July 14, 2004) is a Canadian professional ice hockey defenceman for the Toronto Sceptres of the Professional Women's Hockey League (PWHL). She played college ice hockey at Boston University and Ohio State.

== Playing career ==
=== College ===
Disher began her college ice hockey career for Boston University during the 2022–23 season. During her freshman year, she recorded seven goals and ten assists in 34 games. In February 2023, she led all Hockey East freshmen in goals (4) and points (6) and had a team-best 23 blocked shots during the month. She was subsequently named the Hockey East Rookie of the Month. Following the season she was named to the Hockey East All-Rookie Team and was runner-up for Hockey East Rookie of the Year. During the 2023–24 season, in her sophomore year, she recorded three goals and eight assists in 35 games.

In April 2024, she transferred to Ohio State. During the 2024–25 season, in her junior year, she recorded three goals and eight assists in 40 games. During the 2025–26 season, in her senior year, she recorded two goals and 13 assists in 41 games.

=== Professional ===
On June 17, 2026, Disher was drafted in the third round, 32nd overall, by the Toronto Sceptres in the 2026 PWHL Draft.

== Career statistics ==
			Regular season					Playoffs
Season	Team	League	GP	G	A	Pts	PIM	GP	G	A	Pts	PIM
2022–23	Boston University	Hockey East	34	7	10	17	28	—	—	—	—	—
2023–24	Boston University	Hockey East	35	3	8	11	10	—	—	—	—	—
2024–25	Ohio State University	WCHA	40	3	8	11	14	—	—	—	—	—
2025–26	Ohio State University	WCHA	41	2	13	15	29	—	—	—	—	—
NCAA totals			150	15	54	69	81	—	—	—	—	—
