= Laila Edwards =

American ice hockey player (born 2004)

- Edwards playing for the Wisconsin Badgers in 2025
- Born: January 25, 2004 (age 22) Cleveland Heights, Ohio, U.S.
- Height: 6 ft 1 in (185 cm)
- Position: Defense
- Shoots: Right
- PWHL team Former teams: San Jose Sea Lions: University of Wisconsin
- National team: United States
- Playing career: 2022–present
Medal record
Olympic Games
Gold medal – first place	2026 Milano Cortina	Team
World Championship
Gold medal – first place	2025 Czechia
Gold medal – first place	2026 Denmark
Silver medal – second place	2024 United States
World U18 Championship
Silver medal – second place	2022 United States

Laila Edwards (born January 25, 2004) is an American professional ice hockey player who is a defender for the San Jose Sea Lions of the Professional Women's Hockey League (PWHL) and a member of the United States women's national ice hockey team. She has won two World Championship medals, including gold at the 2025 World Championship and silver at the 2024 World Championship, where she was named Tournament MVP at age 20, becoming the youngest player to receive the honor.

In 2023, Edwards made history as the first Black woman to play for the U.S. women's senior national team. She later became the first Black woman to score for Team USA at both the 2024 World Championships and the 2026 Winter Olympics, where she also became the team's first Black gold medalist.

At the collegiate level, Edwards has won three NCAA national championships with Wisconsin (2023, 2025, 2026). She was a Patty Kazmaier Award top-three finalist in 2025 and led the nation with 35 goals during her junior season. Edwards won the Bob Allen Women's Player of the Year Award in 2024.

== Early life ==
Born in Cleveland Heights, Ohio to Charone Gray-Edwards and Robert Edwards, Laila was raised in Cleveland Heights with her siblings: older brother Robert (Bobby), older sister Chayla, younger brother Colson, and sister Britney Gray.

Edwards began figure skating at age three before switching to ice hockey at age four or five. Her father enrolled her and three of her siblings in the Cleveland Heights Youth Hockey Program. By age eight, she was traveling to out-of-state tournaments and played AAA hockey with boys' teams, including the Cleveland Jr. Lumberjacks and Cleveland Barons. She also participated in the Pittsburgh Penguins Elite Girls hockey program.

Edwards left Cleveland Heights at age 13 to attend Bishop Kearney High School in Rochester, New York, for its elite girls' hockey program. During the 2021–22 season, she recorded 38 goals and 59 assists for the under-19 team at Bishop Kearney. She finished her career at Bishop Kearney with 147 goals and 266 assists in 287 games from 2018 to 2022. She skipped her high school graduation ceremony to compete at the 2022 IIHF World Women's U18 Championship.

== Playing career ==
=== Collegiate ===
Edwards (lower left) celebrates with Wisconsin Badgers teammates after winning 2024 NCAA DI tournament quarterfinals

Edwards began her collegiate career for Wisconsin during the 2022–23 season. During her freshman year, she recorded 13 goals and 14 assists in 41 games. Following the season, she was named to the WCHA All-Rookie Team. During the 2023 NCAA Division I women's ice hockey tournament, she recorded four goals and one assist to help Wisconsin win their seventh national championship. She was subsequently named to the NCAA All-Tournament team.

During the 2023–24 season, in her sophomore year, she recorded 21 goals and 35 assists in 41 games. Following the season, she was named to the All-WCHA Third Team. On May 29, 2024, she was named the recipient of the USA Hockey Bob Allen Women's Player of the Year Award.

On September 18, 2024, she was named an alternate captain for the 2024–25 season. In her junior year, she recorded 35 goals and 36 assists in 41 games. Her 35 goals led the nation and were the most by a Badgers player since Brianna Decker recorded 37 goals during the 2011–12 season. Following the season she was named to the All-WCHA First Team and a top-three finalist for the Patty Kazmaier Award.

During the semifinals of the 2025 NCAA Division I women's ice hockey tournament, she recorded a hat-trick to help Wisconsin advance to the national championship game for the third consecutive season.

The next season Edwards completed her collegiate career with a third championship win for the Badgers. She graduated from Wisconsin with a 4.0 GPA and a Bachelor's degree in social welfare.

=== Professional ===
On June 17, 2026, Edwards was selected fourth overall in the 2026 PWHL Draft, to the San Jose Sea Lions, making her the first entry drafted player in franchise history and the highest-selected black woman in Professional Women’s Hockey League history.

== International play ==
=== Junior ===
Edwards represented the United States at the 2022 IIHF World Women's U18 Championship where she was an alternate captain. She led the team in scoring, with four goals and four assists in five games and won a silver medal. Following the tournament she was named the tournament's most valuable player, best forward and named to the All-Tournament team.

=== Senior ===
External videos
- Laila Edwards: The first Black woman to play for the U.S. national hockey team, TSN

In November 2023, Edwards was named to the United States women's national ice hockey team for the November Rivalry Series against Canada. She was the first Black woman to play for the U.S. women's senior national team.

==== World Championships ====
External videos
- Laila Edwards Hat Trick Lifts Team USA over Finland in 2024 Women's Worlds Semifinal, USA Hockey

On March 31, 2024, Edwards was named to the United States roster for the 2024 IIHF Women's World Championship and was the first Black woman to play for the United States at the IIHF World Women's Championship. During a preliminary round game against Czechia on April 5, 2024, Edwards became the first black woman to score a goal for team USA at the IIHF World Women's Championship. During the semifinals against Finland, Edwards recorded a hat-trick to help lead the United States to the gold medal game against Canada. She finished the tournament with six goals and two assists in seven games and won a silver medal. She was subsequently named the Tournament MVP and named to the All-Star team, becoming the youngest player to be named MVP at an IIHF World Women's Championship.

On March 5, 2025, Edwards was named to the United States roster for the 2025 IIHF Women's World Championship. After being told she would have a better chance at staying on the roster at defense than forward, she switched positions. During the tournament, she recorded one goal and three assists in seven games and won a gold medal.

==== Olympics ====
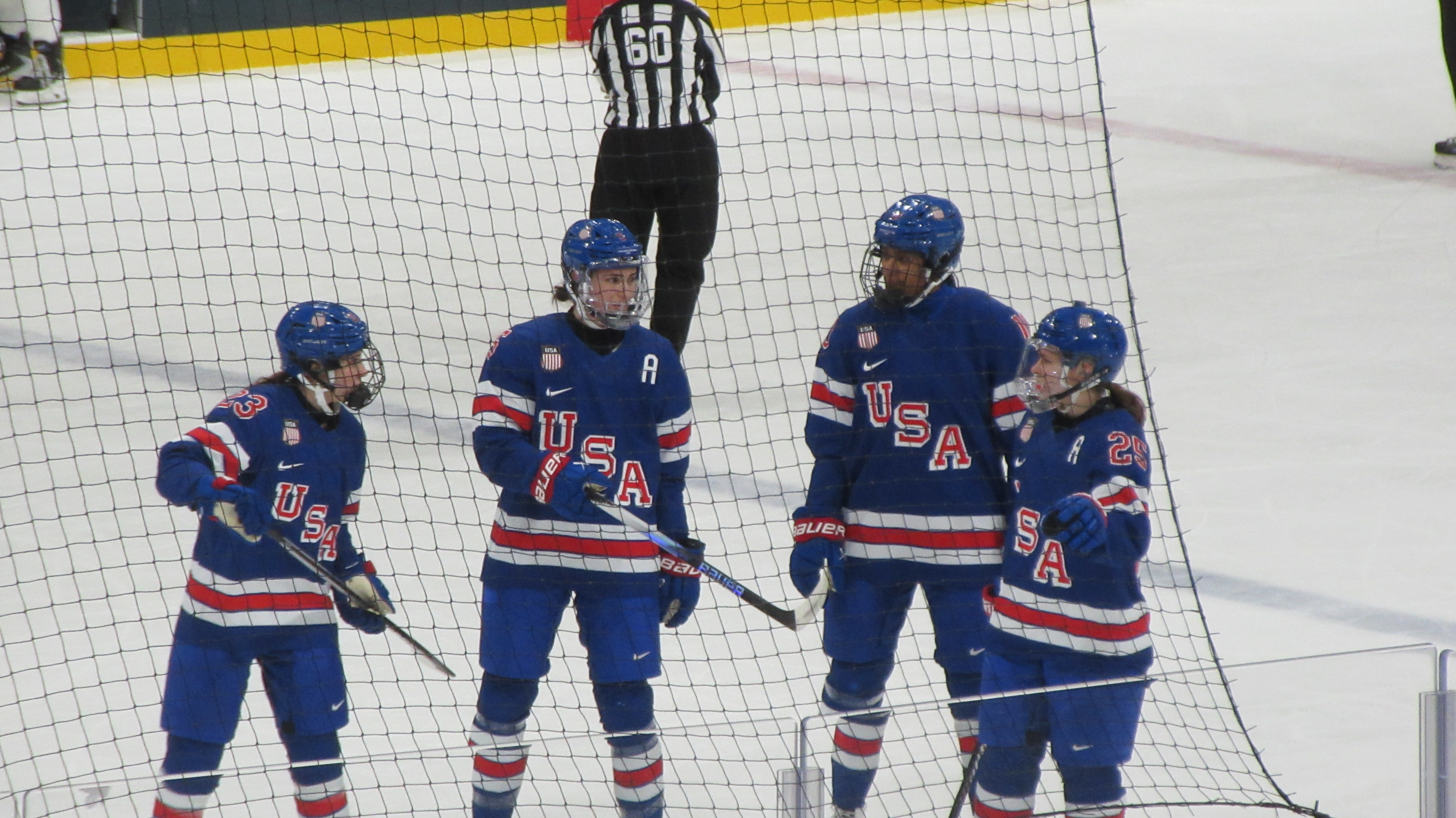
Edwards (center right) with her fellow teammates at the 2026 Winter Olympics

On January 2, 2026, Edwards was named to Team USA's roster to compete at the 2026 Winter Olympics. She was the first Black woman to play hockey for team USA at the Olympics. During the team's last group stage game against Canada, Edwards scored the fifth goal lifting the U.S. to a 5–0 shutout against their rivals. During the quarterfinal game, Edwards registered a goal and an assist as the U.S. eliminated host nation Italy in a 6–0 win. It marked the first time that the U.S. and Italy played each other at the Olympics or any other international competition. She finished the tournament with two goals and six assists in seven games and won a gold medal. During the gold medal game against Canada she assisted on the game-tying goal by Hilary Knight at the end of the third period to force overtime. She became the first Black American woman to win Olympic gold in ice hockey. Following the tournament she was named to the media all-star team.

== Personal life ==
Her sister Chayla also played ice hockey for Wisconsin.

== Career statistics ==
=== Regular season and playoffs ===
			Regular season					Playoffs
Season	Team	League	GP	G	A	Pts	PIM	GP	G	A	Pts	PIM
2022–23	University of Wisconsin	WCHA	41	13	14	27	10	—	—	—	—	—
2023–24	University of Wisconsin	WCHA	41	21	35	56	12	—	—	—	—	—
2024–25	University of Wisconsin	WCHA	41	35	36	71	8	—	—	—	—	—
2025–26	University of Wisconsin	WCHA	28	12	33	45	8	—	—	—	—	—
NCAA totals			151	81	118	199	38	—	—	—	—	—

=== International ===
Year	Team	Event	Result	GP	G	A	Pts	PIM
2022	United States	U18	2nd place, silver medalist(s)	5	4	4	8	2
2024	United States	WC	2nd place, silver medalist(s)	7	6	2	8	0
2025	United States	WC	1st place, gold medalist(s)	7	1	3	4	0
2026	United States	OG	1st place, gold medalist(s)	7	2	6	8	2
Junior totals				5	4	4	8	2
Senior totals				21	9	11	20	2

== Awards and honors ==
Honors	Year
College
WCHA All-Rookie Team	2023
NCAA All-Tournament Team	2023
All-WCHA Third Team	2024
All-WCHA First Team	2025
NCAA All-Tournament Team	2025
All-WCHA Second Team	2026
NCAA All-Tournament Team	2026
International
IIHF World Women's U18 Championship Best Forward	2022
IIHF World Women's U18 Championship Most Valuable Player	2022
IIHF World Women's U18 Championship Media All-Star Team	2022
IIHF World Women's Championship Most Valuable Player	2024
IIHF World Women's Championship Media All-Star Team	2024
Winter Olympics Media All-Star Team	2026
USA Hockey
Bob Allen Women's Player of the Year Award	2024

== See also ==
- Black players in ice hockey
