= Ève Gascon =

Canadian ice hockey goaltender

- Born: May 9, 2003 (age 23) Terrebonne, Quebec, Canada
- Height: 173 cm (5 ft 8 in)
- Weight: 78 kg (172 lb; 12 st 4 lb)
- Position: Goaltender
- Catches: Left
- NCAA team: University of Minnesota Duluth
- National team: Canada

Ève Gascon (born May 9, 2003) is a Canadian college ice hockey player who is a goaltender for the University of Minnesota Duluth of the National Collegiate Athletic Association (NCAA).

== Playing career ==
=== Youth and junior ===
Throughout her youth, Gascon played exclusively on boys' teams. She initially played as a forward but moved to goal at the suggestion of a coach, who felt she could excel in the position. During 2016 to 2018, she played for the Basses-Laurentides Conquérants in the Quebec bantam AAA league. In 2018, she was invited to training camp for the Phénix du Collège Esther-Blondin in the Ligue de hockey midget AAA du Québec. After posting the best statistics of all goaltenders attending the camp, she was selected to the team and became the first girl to play full-time in the boys' AAA midget league in Québec.

In the 2019 draft of the Quebec Junior Hockey League (LHJQ or LHJAAAQ), she was selected 13th overall by the Collège Français de Longueuil, becoming the second female player to be drafted into the LHJQ after Ann-Renée Desbiens was drafted by the Loups de La Tuque in 2012. Her first appearance with the Collège Français came on February 23, 2020, in a game against the Rangers de Montréal-Est, in which she served as the backup netminder to Gabriel Waked. She became the third female player to participate in a LHJQ game and the first in nearly two decades, following in the footsteps of Manon Rhéaume, who played with the Jaguars de Louiseville in the 1991–92 season, and Charline Labonté, who donned a Panthères de St-Jérôme sweater during the 2000–01 season.

In August 2020, she was awarded the Isobel Gathorne-Hardy Award, a Hockey Canada honour which recognizes an active player whose values, leadership and personal traits are representative of all female athletes. Later that year, she committed to playing women's college ice hockey at the University of Minnesota Duluth in the United States.

On March 19, 2022, Gascon became the third woman to play in the Quebec Major Junior Hockey League (QMJHL) when she started in goal for the Gatineau Olympiques, ultimately losing 5–4 in overtime to the Rimouski Oceanic. On April 1, 2022, Gascon became the second woman to win a match in the QMJHL (after Labonté in 2000), backstopping the Olympiques to a 7–3 victory over the Drummondville Voltigeurs.

=== College ===
In her first season with the Bulldogs, Gascon had seven shutouts, which combined with the six posted by teammate Hailey MacLeod were the most of any team in the NCAA. The final of those shutouts was a 1–0 double-overtime victory against UConn in the NCAA tournament. The starter for 21 of the Bulldogs' 39 games, Gascon ranked fifth in the NCAA with a .946 save percentage.

As a sophomore in the 2024–25 season, Gascon recorded a .942 save percentage and 896 saves in 30 games, the fourth-most saves in the NCAA. On 10 occasions throughout the year she made back-to-back starts, and for her efforts she was recognized as a First Team All-American, named to the Western Collegiate Hockey Association (WCHA) First All-Star Team, and won WCHA Goaltender of the Year.

In the 2025–26 season, she was a six-time winner of the WCHA Goaltender of the Week. Gascon also posted the second most shutouts in the NCAA for the season with ten. This is also the second most of a goaltender in Duluth Bulldogs history. Her 993 saves was the third most in a single-season for the Bulldogs.

The Bulldogs announced their leadership team for the 2026–27 on August 17, 2026 with Gascon named one of two assistant captains.

== International play ==
Medal record

Women's ice hockey

Representing Canada

World Championships
Silver medal – second place	2025 Czechia	
Silver medal – second place	2026 Denmark	

World U18 Championships
Silver medal – second place	2020 Slovakia	

Gascon was invited to the Canada women's national under-18 ice hockey team training camp in preparation for the 2019 IIHF World Women's U18 Championship, where she was the youngest player in attendance but was ultimately not selected to the final roster. The following year, she earned the starting goaltender role at the 2020 IIHF World Women's U18 Championship, playing in four of five games, including the championship final. Canada fell to rival Team USA in the final and claimed silver in the tournament.

Gascon played for Canada's National Women's Development Team at the 2024 Six Nations tournament in December 2024, part of the 2024–25 Euro Hockey Tour. She was later named to the Canadian national team for the 2025 World Championship, where she dressed for two of seven games in a backup role but did not play.

She was named to the roster for the 2026 IIHF Women's World Championship. Gascon played her first game as the senior national team starting goaltender on November 8 2026 and remained in net the whole game. She posted a 9-0 shutout against Japan.

== Career statistics ==
=== Regular season and playoffs ===
			Regular season									Playoffs
Season	Team	League	GP	W	L	T/OT	MIN	GA	SO	GAA	SV%	GP	W	L	MIN	GA	SO	GAA	SV%
2021–22	Gatineau Olympiques	QMJHL	2	1	0	1	121	8	0	3.96	.837	—	—	—	—	—	—	—	—
2023–24	University of Minnesota Duluth	WCHA	21	10	9	2	1,289	35	7	1.63	.946	—	—	—	—	—	—	—	—
2024–25	University of Minnesota Duluth	WCHA	30	15	14	1	1,802	55	4	1.83	.942	—	—	—	—	—	—	—	—
NCAA totals			51	25	23	3	3,091	90	11	1.75	.944	—	—	—	—	—	—	—	—

=== International ===
Year	Team	Event	Result	GP	W	L	T	MIN	GA	SO	GAA	SV%
2020	Canada	U18	2nd place, silver medalist(s)	4	3	1	0	258	6	0	1.39	.938
2026	Canada	WC	2nd place, silver medalist(s)	2	2	0	0	120	2	1	1.00	.933
Junior totals				4	3	1	0	258	6	0	1.39	.938
Senior totals				2	2	0	0	120	2	1	1.00	.933

== Awards and honours ==
Honors	Year
College
WCHA All-Rookie Team	2024
First Team All-WCHA	2025
WCHA Goaltender of the Year	2025
First Team All-American	2025
Hockey Canada
Isobel Gathorne-Hardy Award	2020
