= Caroline Harvey =

American ice hockey player (born 2002)

- Harvey in 2025
- Born: October 14, 2002 (age 24) Pelham, New Hampshire, U.S.
- Height: 5 ft 8 in (173 cm)
- Weight: 160 lb (73 kg; 11 st 6 lb)
- Position: Defender
- Shoots: Left
- PWHL team: Vancouver Goldeneyes
- National team: United States
- Playing career: 2021–present
Medal record
Olympic Games
Gold medal – first place	2026 Milano Cortina	Team
Silver medal – second place	2022 Beijing	Team
World Championships
Gold medal – first place	2023 Canada
Gold medal – first place	2025 Czechia
Gold medal – first place	2026 Denmark
Silver medal – second place	2021 Canada
Silver medal – second place	2022 Denmark
Silver medal – second place	2024 United States
World U18 Championship
Gold medal – first place	2020 Slovakia
Silver medal – second place	2019 Japan

Caroline Rose "KK" Harvey (born October 14, 2002) is an American professional ice hockey player who is a defender for the Vancouver Goldeneyes of the Professional Women's Hockey League (PWHL) and member of the United States women's national ice hockey team.

Widely regarded as one of the best defenders in the world, Harvey was named Best Defenseman at the 2023, 2025, and 2026 World Championships, becoming only the second defenseman in history to lead the United States in points at an Olympics or World Championship. She was named the IIHF Female Player of the Year in 2026.

Harvey made her Olympic debut at the 2022 Winter Olympics in Beijing at age 19, winning a silver medal as the youngest player on Team USA's roster. Internationally, she has won two World Championship gold medals (2023, 2025) and three silver medals (2021, 2022, 2024), and has been selected to three World Championship All-Star teams. At the 2023 World Championship, she led the tournament in scoring with 14 points and was the first skater to lead the United States in both points and ice time at a major tournament.

Harvey played college ice hockey for the Wisconsin Badgers. At Wisconsin, she was a three-time NCAA national champion (2023, 2025, 2026) and has set numerous program records for defensemen. In her junior season (2024–25), she recorded 63 points—the most by a defenseman in a single season in Wisconsin history—and became the program's all-time leading scorer among defensemen with 137 career points. Harvey has been named Western Collegiate Hockey Association (WCHA) Defender of the Year three times, and won the Patty Kazmaier Award in 2026.

== Early life ==
Born in New Hampshire to Martha and David Harvey, Harvey was raised with her older brother, Nolan, and a younger sister, Grace. She earned the nickname "KK" by those close to her because her younger sister Grace could not pronounce "Caroline" when she started talking. Harvey's parents took her to the ice rink as a toddler, placing her in a carrier facing the ice while her brother Nolan learned to play hockey. According to her father, "Her eyes would go back and forth as an infant, and that's how she really got her first start." Harvey began skating at age three and told her aunt at that age that she would make the 2022 U.S. Olympic Team in women's hockey—a prediction she would later fulfill.

Harvey was the only girl who wore a hockey helmet for learn-to-figure-skate lessons at the New England Sports Center in Marlborough, Massachusetts. Her parents wanted her to become a sound skater before beginning hockey, reasoning that figure skaters had the best technique. Once she began playing hockey, Harvey initially wore jersey number 3, the same as her brother Nolan—a number that held special significance for the family because Nolan was born premature at three pounds. Harvey later switched to number 4 because 3 was taken, and the number 4 was associated with defensemen, famously Boston Bruins legend Bobby Orr. As a youth, Harvey demonstrated exceptional dedication to training. Between ages 10 and 13, she engaged in boxing training at Ramalho's West End Gym in Lowell, Massachusetts—a facility that served as a setting for the 2010 film The Fighter. She impressed Dicky Eklund, the trainer portrayed by Christian Bale in the film, who described her as tenacious and said, "She hits like a truck." Eklund wanted to enter Harvey in the Silver Mittens youth boxing tournament, but her mother decided against competitive boxing, though Harvey continued boxing training to improve her foot speed, hand speed, and endurance. At age 12, Harvey had a boxing setup in her garage, including a speed bag, which impressed her youth hockey coach when he witnessed her dedication to off-ice training.

At age 13, Harvey left home to attend Bishop Kearney High School in Rochester, New York, enrolling in the Bishop Kearney Selects hockey program. She played for the Selects Academy U16 team for two seasons before moving up to the U19 team. Harvey became known for her exceptional work ethic, with teachers arriving early to work finding her running sprints, working in the shooting room, or completing extra workouts before school. Her sprint testing numbers in her mid-teens rivaled those of veteran national team players. With the Bishop Kearney Selects U19 team, Harvey won two New York state championships.

== Playing career ==
=== College ===
Harvey with Wisconsin in 2025

Harvey was originally committed to play college ice hockey for the Wisconsin during the 2021–22 NCAA season but deferred to the 2022–23 NCAA season after being selected to represent team USA at the 2022 Winter Olympics. During the 2022–23 season, in her rookie year, she recorded 12 goals and 26 assists in 39 games. She led all WCHA rookies with 38 points. Her 38 points were the fifth most in program history by a defender and only trailed Sis Paulsen for most points as a rookie defender. Following an outstanding season, she was named to the WCHA All-Rookie team and Second Team All-WCHA and was named the WCHA Rookie of the Year. She was also named CCM/AHCA Second-Team All-American. She became first Badger player to earn All-American honors as a freshman since Meghan Hunter during the 2000–01 season. During the NCAA semifinals Harvey scored the game-winning goal in overtime against Minnesota to send Wisconsin to the championship game.

On September 18, 2024, Harvey was named team co-captain for the 2024–25 season, along with Casey O'Brien. During October 2024, she led all defenders in the league with 14 points, while her 10 assists on the month ranked second among all players. She was subsequently named the WCHA Defender of the Month. During her junior year, she recorded 16 goals and 42 assists in 38 games. She led all defenders in the NCAA in scoring with 58 points, and recorded the most points by a defender in a season in program history. During conference play she recorded ten goals and 26 assists in 28 games, and was named the WCHA Defender of the Year for the second consecutive year. She finished her junior year with 18 goals and 45 assists in 41 games, and helped lead Wisconsin to their eighth national championship. Her 18 goals tied a single-season program record for most goals scored by a defenceman.

On September 11, 2025, Harvey was named team captain for the 2025–26 season. During October 2025, she led all WCHA defenders in scoring with five goals and eight assists in nine games. She recorded at least one point in all but one game during the month. She was subsequently named Defender of the Month. During November 2025, she led all NCCAA Division I skaters in scoring with four goals and 16 assists and was named Defender of the Month for the second consecutive month. On November 29, 2025, against Mercyhurst, she recorded her 168th career point, surpassing Ronda Curtin as the WCHA's all-time defensive point scorer. She was named Defender of the Month for the third consecutive month in December 2025. During her senior year, she led all WCHA defenders in conference play in scoring with 14 goals and 31 assists in 21 games. She led all defenders in the NCAA in points (63), goals (18), and assists (45). She ranked first in the nation in assists per game (1.40) and is second in points per game (1.97). Following the season she was named the WCHA Defender of the Year for the third consecutive year, and named WCHA Player of the Year. She also won the 2026 Patty Kazmaier Award, becoming the third defender and seventh Badger overall to win the award. The Badgers won the 2026 Women's Frozen Four, making it Harvey's 3rd NCAA Championship title. She recorded one assist in each game against Penn State in the semi-finals and Ohio State in the finals, which gave her a total of 64 points in the 2025-26 season, second on the Badgers only behind forward Lacey Eden.

=== Professional ===
On June 17, 2026, Harvey was selected first overall by the Vancouver Goldeneyes in the 2026 PWHL Draft. On September 29, 2026, she signed a three-year contract with the Goldeneyes.

== International play ==
=== Junior ===
Harvey first represented the United States at the U-18 level in 2018, when she was selected to play in the Under-18 Series. She competed in two U-18 World Championships with Team USA. At the 2019 IIHF World Women's U18 Championship, Harvey won a silver medal. She returned to the U-18 World Championship at the 2020 tournament, where she posted a team-high +4 plus–minus rating in five games and won a gold medal.

=== Senior ===
==== World Championships ====
As of 2026 and through six World Championships, Harvey has won three gold medals and three silver medals and has been named to four All-Star teams. At age 18, she was the youngest player named to the United States roster for the 2021 IIHF Women's World Championship in Calgary, Alberta. She recorded one goal and two assists in six games—including her first senior-team goal—as the United States won a silver medal. Harvey returned to the World Championship at the 2022 tournament in Herning and Frederikshavn, Denmark, where she recorded three goals and five assists for eight points in seven games as the United States won a silver medal.

At the 2023 IIHF Women's World Championship in Brampton, Ontario, Harvey led the tournament in scoring with four goals and ten assists for 14 points in seven games, becoming only the second defenseman in history to lead the United States in points at an Olympics or World Championship. She was also the first skater to lead the United States in both points and ice time at a World Championship. The United States defeated Canada 6–3 in the gold medal game, with Harvey tying the game 3–3 early in the third period. She was subsequently named Best Defenseman of the tournament by the directorate and was selected to the All-Star team. She represented the United States at the 2024 IIHF Women's World Championship in Utica, New York, where she tied for the tournament lead in scoring with two goals and eight assists for ten points in seven games. The United States won a silver medal, and Harvey was named to the All-Star team for the second consecutive year.

At the 2025 IIHF Women's World Championship in Prague, Czech Republic, she recorded two goals and two assists for four points in seven games as the United States won a gold medal. She was named Best Defenseman of the tournament for the second time in her career. At the 2026 IIHF Women's World Championship, she led the tournament in scoring with six goals and ten assists in seven games as the United States won a gold medal and was named tournament MVP. She was also named Best Defenseman of the tournament for the third time in her career and selected to the All-Star team.

==== Olympics ====
In January 2022, Harvey was named to Team USA's roster for the 2022 Winter Olympics in Beijing, China, becoming the youngest player on the team at age 19. The selection came at a pivotal moment, as Harvey had been prepared to enroll as a freshman at the University of Wisconsin if she did not make the Olympic roster. Harvey deferred her enrollment to join the national team for the Olympics.

During the Olympic tournament, Harvey was scoreless in seven games as the United States won a silver medal, falling to Canada in the gold medal game. As the youngest player on the roster, Harvey struggled with confidence and finding her place among her childhood idols. Following the Olympics, U.S. head coach John Wroblewski had a conversation with Harvey in Denmark before the 2022 World Championship, reminding her that she had already accomplished everything a player could by age 19 and encouraging her to play aggressively without fear of mistakes. Harvey's performance improved significantly in subsequent international tournaments, culminating in her Best Defenseman honors at the 2023 and 2025 World Championships.

On January 2, 2026, Harvey was named to team USA's roster to compete at the 2026 Winter Olympics in Milan. During the team's last group stage game against Canada, she recorded a goal and two assists to help lift the U.S. to a 5–0 shutout against their rivals. In the quarterfinals of the 2026 Olympics, Harvey recorded two assists as the US eliminated host nation Italy in a 6–0 win. It marked the first time that the United States and Italy played each other in women's ice hockey at the Winter Olympics. Harvey tied for the tournament lead in scoring with two goals and seven assists in seven games, and won a gold medal. She also led the team in average time on ice at 22:43. She was subsequently named tournament MVP, the Directorate Award as Best Defender, and named to the Media All-Star team.

== Personal life ==
According to her USA Hockey profile, Harvey's favorite postgame meal is a wheat bagel with honey peanut butter and chocolate milk.

== Career statistics ==
=== Regular season and playoffs ===
			Regular season
Season	Team	League	GP	G	A	Pts	PIM
2022–23	Wisconsin	WCHA	40	13	26	39	26
2023–24	Wisconsin	WCHA	32	5	30	35	12
2024–25	Wisconsin	WCHA	41	18	45	63	10
2025-26	Wisconsin	WCHA	33	18	46	64	10
NCAA totals			114	36	101	137	48

=== International ===
Year	Team	Event	Result	GP	G	A	Pts	PIM
2019	United States	U18	2nd place, silver medalist(s)	5	0	0	0	4
2020	United States	U18	1st place, gold medalist(s)	5	0	0	0	2
2021	United States	WC	2nd place, silver medalist(s)	6	1	2	3	0
2022	United States	OG	2nd place, silver medalist(s)	7	0	0	0	2
2022	United States	WC	2nd place, silver medalist(s)	7	3	5	8	2
2023	United States	WC	1st place, gold medalist(s)	7	4	10	14	6
2024	United States	WC	2nd place, silver medalist(s)	7	2	8	10	2
2025	United States	WC	1st place, gold medalist(s)	7	2	2	4	0
2026	United States	OG	1st place, gold medalist(s)	7	2	7	9	0
2026	United States	WC	1st place, gold medalist(s)	7	6	10	16	8
Junior totals				10	0	0	0	6
Senior totals				55	20	44	64	20

== Awards and honors ==
Honors	Year
College
All-WCHA Rookie Team	2023
All-WCHA Second Team	2023
WCHA Rookie of the Year	2023
CCM/AHCA Hockey Second Team All-American	2023
NCAA All-Tournament Team	2023
All-WCHA First Team	2024
WCHA Defender of the Year	2024
CCM/AHCA Hockey First Team All-American	2024
NCAA All-Tournament Team	2024
All-WCHA First Team	2025
WCHA Defender of the Year	2025
NCAA All-Tournament Team	2025
All-WCHA First Team	2026
WCHA Defender of the Year	2026
WCHA Player of the Year	2026
Patty Kazmaier Award	2026
NCAA All-Tournament Team	2026
International
IIHF Women's World Championship Best Defenceman	2023, 2025, 2026
IIHF Women's World Championship MVP	2026
IIHF Women's World Championship Media All-Star Team	2023, 2024, 2026
Winter Olympics Best Defenceman	2026
Winter Olympics Media All-Star Team	2026
Winter Olympics Tournament Most Valuable Player	2026
IIHF Female Player of the Year	2026
USA Hockey
Bob Allen Women's Player of the Year Award	2023, 2026
