= Sloane Matthews =

- Born: July 18, 2004 (age 22) Wayzata, Minnesota, U.S.
- Height: 5 ft 6 in (168 cm)
- Position: Forward
- Shoots: Right
- PWHL team: San Jose Sea Lions
- Playing career: 2026–present

Sloane Matthews (born July 18, 2004) is an American professional ice hockey player for the San Jose Sea Lions of the Professional Women's Hockey League. (PWHL). She played college ice hockey at Ohio State.

== Playing career ==
Matthews started skating at age three, but didn't begin playing hockey until she was 10.

=== College ===
During the 2025-26 season, Matthews appeared in 41 games for the Buckeyes. She amassed a career high 44 points. Her seven power play goals led the team.

=== Professional ===
On June 17, 2026, Matthews was drafted in the second round, 16th overall, by the San Jose Sea Lions in the 2026 PWHL Draft.

== Awards and Honors ==
- NCAA Frozen Four National Champion (2024)
- WCHA Final Faceoff Champion (2026)
- WCHA Final Faceoff All-Tournament Team (2026)
- WCHA All-Academic Team (2024, 2025, 2026)
