= Sara Swiderski =

Canadian ice hockey player (born 2004)

- Born: November 11, 2004 (age 21) Langley, British Columbia, Canada
- Height: 5 ft 9 in (175 cm)
- Position: Defence
- Shoots: Right
- PWHL team: Minnesota Frost
- Playing career: 2026–present

Sara Swiderski (born November 11, 2004) is a professional ice hockey defenceman for the Minnesota Frost of the Professional Women's Hockey League (PWHL). She previously played college ice hockey at Clarkson and Ohio State. She was drafted ninth overall in the 2026 PWHL Draft.

== Playing career ==
=== College ===
Swiderski began her college career at Clarkson University, where she skated in 78 games, scoring 19 points and achieving a +35. She moved to Ohio State for her junior season.

=== Professional ===
On June 17, 2026, Swiderski was drafted ninth overall by the Minnesota Frost in the 2026 PWHL Draft.

=== International play ===
Swiderski was a member of Canada's 2022 IIHF U-18 Women's World Championship team. She won gold and was named the tournament's top defender, as well as to the all-tournament team.

She attended the 2022 Canadian National Team Selection Camp.

== Career statistics ==
			Regular season					Playoffs
Season	Team	League	GP	G	A	Pts	PIM	GP	G	A	Pts	PIM
2022–23	Clarkson University	ECAC	40	2	7	9	22	—	—	—	—	—
2023–24	Clarkson University	ECAC	38	2	8	10	24	—	—	—	—	—
2024–25	Ohio State University	ECAC	37	1	11	12	42	—	—	—	—	—
2025–26	Ohio State University	ECAC	33	8	19	27	20	—	—	—	—	—
NCAA totals			148	13	45	58	108	—	—	—	—	—
