= Hailey MacLeod =

- Born: June 12, 2004 (age 22) Abbotsford, British Columbia, Canada
- Height: 6 ft 0 in (183 cm)
- Position: Goaltender
- Catches: Left
- PWHL team: Montreal Victoire
- Playing career: 2026–present

Hailey MacLeod (born June 12, 2004) is a Canadian professional ice hockey goaltender for the Montreal Victoire of the Professional Women's Hockey League (PWHL). She began her college ice hockey with the Minnesota Duluth Bulldogs. Her final two seasons were spent with Ohio State.

== Playing career ==
=== College ===
MacLeod spent her first two seasons of NCAA hockey competing for the Minnesota Duluth Bulldogs. Joining Ohio State in the autumn of 2024, she posted an 8-1-1 record in her first season with the Buckeyes, including three shutouts.

Taking the starter's role in 2025-26, MacLeod finished with a 26-4-0 record. Breaking the program record for most wins in a season, MacLeod also recorded six shutouts during the season.

=== Professional ===
On June 17, 2026, MacLeod was drafted in the fourth round, 48th overall, by the Montreal Victoire in the 2026 PWHL Draft.

== Awards and honours ==
- 2026 WCHA Final Faceoff Champion
- 2026 WCHA All Tournament Team
- WCHA Third Team All-Star (2025-26)
