= 2024 Hockey East women's ice hockey tournament =

International sporting competition

2024 Hockey East Women's ice hockey tournament
- Dates: February 28– March 9, 2024
- Teams: 10
- Finals site: Toscano Family Ice Forum; Storrs, Connecticut
- Champions: Connecticut (1st title)
- Winning coach: Chris MacKenzie (1st title)
- MVP: Tia Chan (Connecticut)
- Hockey East Women's Ice Hockey Tournaments

The 2024 Hockey East Women's Ice Hockey Tournament was the 22nd edition of the Women's Hockey East Tournament. It was played between February 28 and March 9, 2024. The championship was hosted by the highest remaining seed, Connecticut. Connecticut defeated Northeastern 1–0 after overtime to earn their first ever tournament championship. They earned the conference's automatic bid into the 2024 NCAA National Collegiate women's ice hockey tournament.

== Format ==
The tournament included all ten teams in the conference. Teams were ranked according to their finish in the conference standings. Seeds 1–6 earned a bye into the quarterfinal round, while seeds 7–10 played to determine the remaining quarterfinalists. Winners in the opening round were reseeded and advanced to play top two seeds in reverse order. Winners of the quarterfinal matches were again reseeded for the semifinal, and the winners of those two games faced off in the championship.

All series were single-elimination with opening round and quarterfinal matches occurring at home team sites. The semifinals were hosted at the two highest remaining team sites. The championship was hosted at the highest remaining seeds site. The tournament champion receives an automatic bid into the 2024 NCAA National Collegiate women's ice hockey tournament.

== Standings ==
2023–24 WHEA standings
	Conference										Overall					
	GP	W	L	T	OTW	OTL	SOW	PTS	GF	GA	GP	W	L	T	GF	GA
#11 UConn †	27	19	4	4	2	1	1	61	70	28	38	25	8	5	91	47
#13 Northeastern	27	16	8	3	4	2	2	51	67	40	39	25	11	3	94	50
New Hampshire	27	14	11	2	0	4	2	50	63	64	36	18	16	2	85	87
#15 Boston College	27	13	9	5	2	1	3	46	75	64	36	15	14	7	95	97
Providence	27	12	10	5	1	2	2	44	64	59	35	13	17	5	72	84
Vermont	27	11	12	4	2	2	2	39	61	70	35	13	17	5	79	94
Boston University	27	12	13	1	2	1	0	36	65	65	35	14	18	3	87	91
Maine	27	11	14	2	3	1	0	33	64	65	35	15	18	2	94	89
Merrimack	27	7	17	3	2	4	1	27	48	76	36	11	22	3	62	104
Holy Cross	27	4	20	3	2	2	3	18	39	84	35	8	24	3	65	103
Championship: March 9, 2024 † indicates conference regular season champion; * indicates conference tournament champion Rankings: USCHO.com; updated March 24, 2024

== Bracket ==
Teams are reseeded after the Opening Round and Quarterfinals

Opening Round; February 28
10	Holy Cross	4
7	Boston University	2
9	Merrimack	2*
8	Maine	1

Quarterfinals; March 1-2
10	Holy Cross	2
1	Connecticut	4
5	Providence	1
4	Boston College	2*
9	Merrimack	1
2	Northeastern	4
6	Vermont	0
3	New Hampshire	3

Semifinals; March 6
4	Boston College	1
1	Connecticut	2*
3	New Hampshire	1
2	Northeastern	4

Championship; March 9
1	Connecticut	1*
2	Northeastern	0

Note: * denotes overtime period(s)

== Results ==
=== Opening Round ===
==== (10) Holy Cross at (7) Boston University ====
February 28, 2023; 6:00 PM	Holy Cross	4–2 (2–2, 1–0, 1–0)	Boston University	Walter Brown Arena, Boston, Massachusetts; Attendance: 340

Game reference

Madison Beck
Goalies
Callie Shanahan
Referees:
Dmitrii Antipin
James Troup
Linesmen:
Jennifer Cameron
Caley Eaton

Lane Lewis (5) (Elliott, Saarela) – 0:29	1–0
	1–1	13:51 – PP – Tamara Giaquinto (5) (Li Welcke, Lu Welcke)
	1–2	18:05 – Julia Shaunessy (1) (Fitzgerald, Giaquinto)
Alexia Moreau (10) (Elliott, Feeney) – 19:28	2–2
Alexia Moreau (11) (Lewis, Cantelon) – GW – 29:13	3–2
Millie Sirum (12) – 56:06	4–2

8 min
Penalties
4 min
16
Shots
39

==== (9) Merrimack at (8) Maine ====
February 28, 2024; 6:00 PM	Merrimack	2–1 (OT) (0–0, 0–1, 1–0, 1–0)	Maine	Alfond Sports Arena, Orono, Maine; Attendance: 582

Game reference

Calli Hogarth
Goalies
Jorden Mattison
Referees:
Derek Antipin
James Troup
Linesmen:
Jennifer Cameron
Caley Eaton

	0–1	33:39 – PP – Ida Kuoppala (21) (Morrison)
Celine Tedenby (8) (Chang, Qualley) – PP – 41:40	1–1
Allison Reeb (5) (Szott, Nemes) – GW – 61:36	2–1

6 min
Penalties
6 min
33
Shots
29

=== Quarterfinals ===
==== (5) Providence at (4) Boston College ====
March 1, 2024; 6:00 PM	Providence	1–2 (OT) (0–0, 1–0, 0–1, 0–1)	Boston College	Kelley Rink, Chestnut Hill, Massachusetts; Attendance: 589

Game reference

Hope Walinski
Goalies
Grace Campbell
Referees:
Kelly Cooke
Charly Hurley
Linesmen:
Laura Schmidlein
Jay Gallagher

Audrey Knapp (14) (Cavaliere, Johnson) – 21:13	1–0
	1–1	45:23 – Kate Ham (3) (Goffredo, Pellerin)
	1–2	77:23 – GW – Sammy Taber (13) (Roy)

4 min
Penalties
8 min
47
Shots
35

==== (10) Holy Cross at (1) Connecticut ====
March 2, 2024; 1:00 PM	Holy Cross	2–4 (0–1, 1–2, 1–1)	Connecticut	Toscano Family Ice Forum, Storrs, Connecticut; Attendance: 1,436

Game reference

Madison Beck
Goalies
Tia Chan
Referees:
Patrick Silva
Courtney Drennen
Linesmen:
Abbey Torres
Andrew Kirk

	0–1	9:16 – PP – Coryn Tormala (6) (Walker, Svetek)
	0–2	30:21 – Ashley Allard (6) (Habisch)
	0–3	38:23 – SH, GW – Jada Habisch (16) (Wong)
Lilly Feeney (6) (Michals) – 39:55	1–3
	1–4	42:08 – Brianna Ware (5) (Rinker, Eryou)
Reghan Chadwick (Rourke) – 50:16	2–4

8 min
Penalties
6 min
15
Shots
32

==== (6) Vermont at (3) New Hampshire ====
March 2, 2024; 6:00 PM	Vermont	0–3 (0–0, 0–1, 0–2)	New Hampshire	Whittemore Center, Durham, New Hampshire; Attendance: 724

Game reference

Jessie McPherson
Goalies
Sedona Blair
Referees:
James Troup
Dmitri Antipin
Linesmen:
Evan Cooke
Sarah Hickman

0–1	27:22 – GW – Chavonne Truter (Breton, Verrier)
0–2	42:54 – Tamara Thierus
0–3	57:13 – EN – Annie Berry (Kettyle)

6 min
Penalties
6 min
15
Shots
31

==== (9) Merrimack at (2) Northeastern ====
March 2, 2024; 7:30 PM	Merrimack	1–4 (0–0, 1–2, 0–2)	Northeastern	Matthews Arena, Boston, Massachusetts; Attendance: 483

Game reference

Calli Hogarth
Goalies
Gwyneth Philips
Referees:
Chelsea Rapin
Danika Korpacz
Linesmen:
Kaitlin Hayes
Robert Lamnah

Alex Ferguson (5) (Tedenby) – 21:29	1–0
	1–1	25:43 – Skylar Irving (11) (Carter, Yovetich)
	1–2	30:56 – GW – Katy Knoll (11) (Irving, Carter)
	1–3	55:06 – Ella Blackmore (5) (Shannon, Abela)
	1–4	58:18 – EN – Skylar Irving (12) (Knoll, Mariano)

4 min
Penalties
2 min
22
Shots
39

=== Semifinals ===
==== (3) New Hampshire at (2) Northeastern ====
March 6, 2024; 4:30 PM	New Hampshire	1–4 (0–0, 0–0, 1–4)	Northeastern	Matthews Arena, Boston, Massachusetts; Attendance: 323

Game reference

Sedona Blair
Goalies
Gwyneth Philips
Referees:
Amanda Tassoni
Charly Hurley
Linesmen:
Evan Cooke
Robert Lemnah

	0–1	41:26 – Peyton Anderson (15) (Irving, Knoll)
Chavonne Truter (10) – 53:27	1–1
	1–2	58:15 – PP, GW – Lily Shannon (5) (Compton, Constantinople)
	1–3	59:01 – EN – Skylar Irving (13) (Anderson, Carter)
	1–4	59:47 – EN – Lily Shannon (6) (Thompson)

8 min
Penalties
9 min
29
Shots
32

==== (4) Boston College at (1) Connecticut ====
March 6, 2024; 7:00 PM	Boston College	1–2 (OT) (0–1, 0–0, 1–0, 0–1)	Connecticut	Toscano Family Ice Forum, Storrs, Connecticut; Attendance: 1,207

Game reference

Grace Campbell
Goalies
Tia Chan
Referees:
Courtney Drennen
Dmitrii Antipin
Linesmen:
Jennifer Cameron
Andrew Kirk

	0–1	1:41 – Jada Habisch (17) (Rinker)
Gaby Roy (13) (Taber) – PP – 21:22	1–1
	1–2	69:10 – GW – Kathryn Stockdale (11) (Woodworth)

10 min
Penalties
2 min
25
Shots
33

=== Championship ===
==== (2) Northeastern at (1) Connecticut ====
March 9, 2024; 12:00 PM	Northeastern	0–1 (OT) (0–0, 0–0, 0–0, 0–1)	Connecticut	Toscano Family Ice Forum, Storrs, Connecticut; Attendance: 1,734

Game reference
Gwyneth Philips	Goalies	Tia Chan	Referees: Kelly Cooke; Chelsea Rapin; Linesmen: Laura Schmidlein; Kaitlin Hayes
0–1 / 79:25 – GW – Megan Woodworth (7) (Svetek, Grimley)			Referees: Kelly Cooke; Chelsea Rapin; Linesmen: Laura Schmidlein; Kaitlin Hayes
19 min	Penalties	4 min	Referees: Kelly Cooke; Chelsea Rapin; Linesmen: Laura Schmidlein; Kaitlin Hayes
38	Shots	52	Referees: Kelly Cooke; Chelsea Rapin; Linesmen: Laura Schmidlein; Kaitlin Hayes

== Tournament Awards ==
=== All Tournament Team ===
- Goalie: Tia Chan, Connecticut
- Defense: Ainsley Svetek, Connecticut
- Defense: Jules Constantinople, Northeastern
- Forward: Peyton Anderson, Northeastern
- Forward: Kathryn Stockdale, Connecticut
- Forward: Megan Woodworth, Connecticut

=== Tournament MVP ===
- Tia Chan, Connecticut
