= 2026 Hockey East women's tournament =

2026 Hockey East Women's ice hockey tournament
- Dates: February 20 – March 7, 2026
- Teams: 10
- Finals site: Toscano Family Ice Forum; Storrs, Connecticut
- Champions: UConn (2nd title)
- Winning coach: Chris MacKenzie (2nd title)
- MVP: Tia Chan (UConn)
- Hockey East Women's Ice Hockey Tournaments

The 2026 Hockey East Women's Tournament was the 24th edition of the Hockey East Women's Tournament. It was played between February 25 and March 7, 2026. Boston University enteed the tournament as the defending champions. The UConn Huskies won the tournament and received the conferences automatic bid to the 2026 women's ice hockey tournament.

== Format ==
The tournament includes all 10 teams with all games being a single-elimination format. Most games were played at the campus of the higher seed, with the exception of the championship, which was played at the lower seed, the Toscano Family Ice Forum at #2 UConn. This was due to #1 Northeastern's main arena, Matthews Arena, being closed. The top six seeds receive a bye to quarterfinals, while seeds seven through 10 play in the first round. Following the opening round, teams are reseeded.

== Standings ==
2025–26 Hockey East standings
	Conference							Overall					
	GP	W	L	T	PTS	GF	GA	GP	W	L	T	GF	GA
#5 Northeastern†	24	21	2	1	65	80	34	34	26	7	1	105	60
#6 UConn*	24	17	6	1	54	76	40	34	24	8	2	99	57
Boston College	24	14	9	1	42	72	56	34	16	17	1	87	96
Holy Cross	24	10	11	3	37	49	46	33	18	12	3	77	55
New Hampshire	24	10	12	2	33	66	68	34	16	15	3	95	82
Vermont	24	9	11	4	32	55	58	36	15	16	5	78	89
Maine	24	8	12	4	30	46	54	34	12	18	4	66	87
Boston University	24	8	14	2	28	45	61	33	10	20	3	60	87
Providence	24	8	14	2	25	45	72	34	11	21	2	63	109
Merrimack	24	4	18	2	15	36	80	34	7	23	4	61	109
Championship: March 7, 2026 † indicates conference regular season champion; * indicates conference tournament champion Rankings: USCHO.com; updated February 23, 2026; Source: Hockey East

== Bracket ==
First Round; February 25
9	Providence	0
8	Boston University	3
10	Merrimack	0
7	Maine	4

Quarterfinals; February 28
8	Boston University	1
1	Northeastern	2**
5	New Hampshire	4
4	Holy Cross	5
7	Maine	1
2	UConn	6
6	Vermont	3
3	Boston College	1

Semifinals; March 3
6	Vermont	1
1	Northeastern	3
2	UConn	6
4	Holy Cross	1

Championship; March 7
2	UConn	2
1	Northeastern	1

== Results ==
=== Opening Round ===
==== (10) Merrimack at (7) Maine ====
February 25, 2026; 5:00 PM	Merrimack	0–4 (0–2, 0–2, 0–0)	Maine	Alfond Arena, Orono, Maine; Attendance: 601

Adreanna Doucette
Lauren Lyons
Goalies
Kiia Lahtinen
Referees:
Benjamin Gosselin
Christopher Leavitt
Linesmen:
Stacey MacKinnon
Caley Eaton

0–1	8:56 – Michaud (Stevenson, Hanson)
0–2	10:21 – Wurm (Shea)
0–3	29:17 – Fetch (Boarder)
0–4	39:18.2 – Wurm (Fong)

4 min
Penalties
6 min
20
Shots
26

==== (9) Providence at (8) Boston University ====
February 25, 2026; 6:00 PM	Providence	0–3 (0–0, 0–1, 0–2)	Boston University	Walter Brown Arena, Boston, Massachusetts; Attendance: 615

Hope Walinski
Goalies
Mari Pietersen
Referees:
Amanda Tassoni
Steven Saul
Linesmen:
Charlie Tremblay
Heidi Niskanen

0–1	20:41 – sh - Healey (Quigg, Kelly)
0–2	58:01 – en - Healey (Kelly, Welcke)
0–3	58:21 – en - Welcke

8 min
Penalties
8 min
20
Shots
31

=== Quarterfinals ===
==== (8) Boston University at (1) Northeastern ====
February 28, 2026; 4:00 PM	Boston University	1–2 2OT (0–1, 1–0, 0–0) (OT: (0–0, 0–1)	Northeastern	Walter Brown Arena, Boston, Massachusetts; Attendance: 1,203

Mari Pietersen
Goalies
Lisa Jönsson
Referees:
Steven Saul
Patrick Silva
Linesmen:
Charlie Tremblay
Kevin Cunningham

	0–1	4:32 – Caron (Constantinople)
Healey – sh - 28:34	1–1
	1–2	81:14 – McDermid (Allard, Shannon)

4 min
Penalties
4 min
40
Shots
36

==== (7) Maine at (2) UConn ====
February 28, 2026; 3:00 PM	Maine	1–6 (0–2, 0–2, 1–2)	UConn	Toscano Family Ice Forum, Storrs, Connecticut; Attendance: 1,006

Kiia Lahtinen
Goalies
Tia Chan

Linesmen:
Andrew Medeiros
Abbey Torres

	0–1	15:13 – Walker (Dewar)
	0–2	17:04 – Josifovic (Murdoch, Stephen)
	0–3	21:22 - pp – Dewar (Allard, Murdoch)
	0–4	23:25 - sh – Pellerin (Murdoch)
	0–5	46:36 - pp – Murdoch (Allard, Duchesne-Chalifoux)
	0–6	48:06 – Woodworth (Pellerin, Campbell)
Michaud (Podewell, Rucinski) – pp - 53:23	1–6

6 min
Penalties
6 min
21
Shots
53

==== (6) Vermont at (3) Boston College ====
February 28, 2026; 1:00 PM	Vermont	3–1 (0–0, 2–0, 1–1)	Boston College	Kelley Rink, Chestnut Hill, Massachusetts; Attendance: 332

Ellie Simmons
Goalies
Grace Campbell
Referees:
Dmitrii Antipin
Benjamin Gosselin
Linesmen:
Heidi Niskanen
Jacob Lapierre

Mesplede (Lloyd-Howe, Podein) - 34:15	1–0
Havana (Mesplede) - 34:15	2–0
	2–1	51:16 - Ham (Thomas, Taber)
Lewis (Brochu) - en - 58:37	3–1

4 min
Penalties
2 min
27
Shots
38

==== (5) New Hampshire at (4) Holy Cross ====
February 28, 2026; 2:00 PM	New Hampshire	4–5 (1–0, 1–2, 2–3)	Holy Cross	Hart Center, Worcester, Massachusetts; Attendance: 1,077

Noemi Martinez
Goalies
Abby Hornung
Referees:
Kelly Cooke
Courtney Drennen
Linesmen:
Jennifer Cameron-Ward
Sarah Hickman

Harty (Linn, Printz) - 18:34	1–0
	1–1	23:29 - Sonntag (Gendron, Sharfman)
	1–2	28:25 - Rourke (Hope, Moreau)
Hush (Makokis, Printz) - pp - 37:25	2–2
	2–3	41:32 - pp - Chadwick (Lewis, Crovo)
	2–4	44:47 - Sonntag (Gendron, Deck)
	2–5	51:52 - pp - Moreau (Rourke, Herzig)
Hartman (Printz) - 56:38	3–5
Printz (Makokis, Botterill) - 58:33	4–5

6 min
Penalties
4 min
40
Shots
31

=== Semifinals ===
==== (6) Vermont at (1) Northeastern ====
March 3, 2026; 6:00 PM	Vermont	1–3 (0–2, 0–0, 1–1)	Northeastern	Walter Brown Arena, Boston, Massachusetts; Attendance: 412

Ellie Simmons
Goalies
Lisa Jönsson
Referees:
Amanda Tassoni
Laura Schmidlein
Linesmen:
Andrew Kirk
Charlie Trembley

	0–1	3:44 – Constantinople (Lalonde, Jackson)
	0–2	14:46 – Jackson
	0–3	43:08 – Caron (Shannon)
Zarcone (DeAnzeris, Mesplede) – 57:43	1–3

12 min
Penalties
6 min
21
Shots
32

==== (4) Holy Cross at (2) UConn ====
March 3, 2026; 6:00 PM	Holy Cross	1–6 (1–1, 0–3, 0–2)	UConn	Toscano Family Ice Forum, Storrs, Connecticut; Attendance: 843

Abby Hornung
Goalies
Tia Chan
Referees:
Chelsea Rapin
Steven Saul
Linesmen:
Jennifer Cameron-Ward
Heidi Niskanen

	0–1	11:15 – pp – Josifovic (Murdoch, Duchesne-Chalifoux)
Carroll (Deck, Rourke) – pp – 18:21	1–1
	1–2	23:49 – Pellerin (Woodworth, Mobarak)
	1–3	38:11 – pp – Woodworth (Serdachny, Walker)
	1–4	39:28.3 – Allard (Murdoch, Josifovic)
	1–5	50:41 – Serdachny (Dewar, Hotles)
	1–6	56:21 – Walker (Dewar)

4 min
Penalties
2 min
28
Shots
3

=== Championship ===
==== (2) UConn at (1) Northeastern ====
March 7, 2026; 3:30 PM	UConn	2–1 2OT (0–0, 1–1, 0–0) (OT: 0–0, 1–0)	Northeastern	Toscano Family Ice Forum, Storrs, Connecticut; Attendance: 2,168

Tia Chan
Goalies
Lisa Jönsson
Referees:
Kelly Cooke
Dmitrii Antipin
Linesmen:
Heidi Niskanen
Charlie Tremblay

Hotles (Dewar, Walker) – 22:22	1–0
	1–1	27:03 – pp – Jones (Zablocki, Lloyd)
Josifovic (Murdoch, Allard) – 95:23	2–1

6 min
Penalties
10 min
56
Shots
58

== Tournament Awards ==
=== All-Tournament Team ===
- F: Claire Murdoch (UConn)
- F: Kyla Josifovic (UConn)
- F: Morgan Jackson (Northeastern)
- D: Julia Stephen (UConn)
- D: Jules Constantinople (Northeastern)
- G: Tia Chan* (UConn)

* Most Outstanding Player
