= Kyla Josifovic =

Canadian ice hockey player (born 2003)

- Born: August 6, 2003 (age 23) Burlington, Ontario, Canada
- Height: 5 ft 11 in (180 cm)
- Position: Forward
- Shoots: Right
- PWHL team: Detroit Clutch
- Playing career: 2022–present

Kyla Josifovic (born August 6, 2003) is a Canadian professional ice hockey forward for the Detroit Clutch of the Professional Women's Hockey League (PWHL). She played college ice hockey at Connecticut.

== Early life ==
Josifovic was born to Mike and April Josifovic, and has an older brother Garret Josifovic. She attended Corpus Christi Catholic Secondary School.

== Playing career ==
=== College ===
Josifovic began her college ice hockey career for Connecticut during the 2022–23 season. During her freshman year she recorded two assists in 34 games. During the 2023–24 season, in her sophomore year, she recorded three goals and six assists in 29 games. During the 2024–25 season, in her junior year, she recorded six goals and 11 assists in 36 games.

During the 2025–26 season, in her senior year, she served as team captain and recorded a career-high 16 goals and 24 assists in 39 games. She became the first Huskies player to record a 40-point season since the 2007–08 season. Following the season she was named to the all-Hockey East third team. During the 2026 Hockey East women's tournament, she scored the game-winning goal in double-overtime to help the Huskies win their second Hockey East tournament championship, and automatically qualify for the 2026 NCAA tournament. She was subsequently named to the Hockey East all-tournament team. During the first round of the NCAA tournament against Princeton she scored two goals to help her team advance to the regional final.

=== Professional ===
On June 17, 2026, Josifovic was drafted in the fourth round, 39th overall, by the Detroit Clutch in the 2026 PWHL Draft.

== Career statistics ==
			Regular season					Playoffs
Season	Team	League	GP	G	A	Pts	PIM	GP	G	A	Pts	PIM
2022–23	University of Connecticut	Hockey East	33	0	2	2	8	—	—	—	—	—
2023–24	University of Connecticut	Hockey East	35	4	6	10	12	—	—	—	—	—
2024–25	University of Connecticut	Hockey East	36	6	11	17	17	—	—	—	—	—
2025–26	University of Connecticut	Hockey East	39	16	24	40	16	—	—	—	—	—
NCAA totals			143	26	43	69	53	—	—	—	—	—
