= 2024–25 NCAA Division I women's ice hockey season =

2024–25 NCAA women's ice hockey season
- NCAA tournament: 2025
- National championship: Ridder Arena; Minneapolis, Minnesota
- NCAA champion: Wisconsin
- Patty Kazmaier Award: Casey O'Brien (Wisconsin)

The 2024–25 NCAA Division I women's ice hockey season began in September 2024 and ended with the 2025 NCAA National Collegiate women's ice hockey tournament's championship game at Ridder Arena in Minneapolis, Minnesota on March 23, 2025.

== Regular season ==
=== Realignment ===
On June 6, 2023, it was announced that College Hockey America would be merging with Atlantic Hockey, with the two conferences operating under one banner by July 1, 2024. On April 30, 2024, the two conferences merged to form Atlantic Hockey America.

=== Standings ===
- 2024–25 Atlantic Hockey America standings
  	Conference							Overall					
  	GP	W	L	T	PTS	GF	GA	GP	W	L	T	GF	GA
  #8 Penn State †*	20	19	1	0	52	74	24	38	31	6	1	135	59
  Mercyhurst	20	13	6	1	39	64	37	39	20	17	2	109	80
  Syracuse	20	11	9	0	35	53	43	37	15	22	0	83	97
  RIT	20	8	10	2	27	52	48	37	16	17	4	94	92
  Lindenwood	20	4	15	1	15	41	72	33	5	26	2	62	144
  Robert Morris	20	2	16	2	9	23	83	35	8	24	3	60	136
  Championship: March 8, 2025 † indicates conference regular season champion;* indicates conference tournament champion Rankings: USCHO.com; updated March 13, 2025
- 2024–25 ECAC Hockey standings
  	Conference							Overall					
  	GP	W	L	T	PTS	GF	GA	GP	W	L	T	GF	GA
  #3 Cornell †*	22	16	2	4	54	77	28	35	25	5	5	115	51
  #5 Colgate	22	18	4	0	52	72	38	39	30	9	0	140	75
  #7 St. Lawrence	22	13	6	3	45.5	56	44	39	22	12	5	99	78
  #9 Clarkson	22	13	8	1	40.5	67	45	40	25	13	2	136	72
  #10 Quinnipiac	22	11	8	3	38.5	51	35	38	22	12	4	97	53
  Yale	22	10	10	2	34	44	41	32	16	13	3	84	61
  #14 Princeton	22	11	9	2	32	62	62	32	18	12	2	116	79
  Brown	22	9	10	3	29.5	46	55	30	14	13	3	75	77
  Union	22	8	14	0	24	40	58	37	13	23	1	69	91
  RPI	22	7	13	2	24	39	69	35	14	18	3	70	90
  Dartmouth	22	3	16	3	14.5	28	59	29	5	21	3	43	78
  Harvard	22	1	20	1	7.5	26	74	29	2	25	2	35	90
  Championship: March 8, 2025 † indicates conference regular season champion;* indicates conference tournament champion Rankings: USCHO.com; updated March 22, 2025
- 2024–25 NEWHA standings
  	Conference							Overall					
  	GP	W	L	T	PTS	GF	GA	GP	W	L	T	GF	GA
  LIU †	28	19	6	3	57	66	43	38	22	12	4	81	64
  Franklin Pierce	28	17	10	1	51	77	55	32	17	14	1	80	71
  Sacred Heart *	28	16	9	3	51	62	42	39	21	15	3	83	74
  Stonehill	28	13	10	5	48	62	49	38	14	19	5	72	110
  Saint Anselm	28	10	11	7	41	70	72	38	12	19	7	85	121
  Assumption	28	10	16	2	36	50	56	36	10	23	3	53	90
  Post	28	11	14	3	36	53	58	37	13	21	3	62	93
  Saint Michael's	28	4	24	0	16	29	94	36	4	32	0	30	154
  Championship: March 8, 2025 † indicates conference regular season champion;* indicates conference tournament champion Rankings: USCHO.com; updated March 13, 2025
- 2024–25 Western Collegiate Hockey Association standings
  	Conference										Overall					
  	GP	W	L	T	OTW	OTL	SOW	PTS	GF	GA	GP	W	L	T	GF	GA
  #1 Wisconsin†*	28	25	1	2	1	0	1	77	137	35	41	38	1	2	221	48
  #2 Ohio State	28	19	6	3	3	0	2	59	95	58	40	29	8	3	155	83
  #4 Minnesota	28	19	8	1	1	0	0	57	95	69	42	29	12	1	153	104
  #6 Minnesota Duluth	28	14	12	2	0	2	2	48	76	53	39	22	15	2	114	70
  #11 St. Cloud State	28	10	13	5	1	1	1	36	53	71	36	15	15	6	74	82
  Minnesota State	28	7	19	2	0	4	1	28	70	97	37	14	21	2	105	118
  St. Thomas	28	6	21	1	2	2	1	20	47	116	36	9	25	2	73	140
  Bemidji State	28	4	24	0	1	0	0	11	34	108	37	6	30	1	56	148
  Championship: March 8, 2025 † indicates conference regular season champion; * indicates conference tournament champion Rankings: USCHO.com; updated March 23, 2025
- 2024–25 WHEA standings
  	Conference							Overall					
  	GP	W	L	T	PTS	GF	GA	GP	W	L	T	GF	GA
  #15 UConn †	27	19	6	2	58	62	38	36	22	12	2	80	60
  #13 Boston University *	27	18	7	2	57	72	43	38	24	12	2	95	75
  #11 Boston College	27	16	9	2	51	79	50	36	21	13	2	104	80
  Providence	27	16	9	2	49	74	61	35	20	12	3	100	74
  Northeastern	27	15	11	1	46	61	49	37	22	14	1	89	68
  Maine	27	10	14	3	38	51	57	35	11	21	3	62	101
  New Hampshire	27	11	14	2	34	54	65	35	15	17	3	70	77
  Vermont	27	7	18	2	27	40	67	36	9	25	2	51	103
  Holy Cross	25	6	17	4	25	34	59	34	10	20	4	54	73
  Merrimack	27	5	18	4	20	48	86	36	9	23	4	66	106
  Championship: March 8, 2025 † indicates conference regular season champion;* indicates conference tournament champion Rankings: USCHO.com; updated March 13, 2025

== Player stats ==
=== Scoring leaders ===
The following players lead the NCAA in points at the conclusion of games played on March 23, 2025.

Note: GP = Games played; G = Goals; A = Assists; Pts = Points; PIM = Penalty minutes;

Player	Class	Team	GP	G	A	Pts
Casey O'Brien	Graduate Student	Wisconsin	41	26	62	88
Kirsten Simms	Junior	Wisconsin	41	25	47	72
Laila Edwards	Junior	Wisconsin	41	35	36	71
Abbey Murphy	Senior	Minnesota	42	33	32	65
Caroline Harvey	Junior	Wisconsin	41	18	45	63
Joy Dunne	Sophomore	Ohio State	40	29	33	62
Lacey Eden	Graduate Student	Wisconsin	41	24	33	57
Tessa Janecke	Junior	Penn State	38	24	29	53
Jocelyn Amos	Sophomore	Ohio State	40	27	25	52
Elyssa Biederman	Junior	Colgate	39	19	32	51

=== Leading goaltenders ===
The following goaltenders lead the NCAA in goals against average at the conclusion of games played on March 23, 2025, minimum 1/3 of team's minutes played.

Note: Pos = Position;GP = Games played; Min, TOI = Minutes played; W = Wins; L = Losses; T,T/OT = Ties; OTL = Overtime losses; GA = Goals-against; GAA = Goals-against average; SO = Shutouts; SA = Shots against; SV = Shots saved; SV% = Save percentage;

Player	Class	Team	GP	Min	W	L	T	GA	SO	SV%	GAA
Ava McNaughton	Sophomore	Wisconsin	39	2,217	36	1	2	46	8	.944	1.25
Kaley Doyle	Graduate Student	Quinnipiac	28	1,676	15	10	3	36	8	.945	1.29
Annelies Bergmann	Sophomore	Cornell	35	2,126	25	5	5	48	10	.943	1.35
Katie DeSa	Junior	Penn State	33	1,947	27	6	0	46	9	.932	1.42
Holly Gruber	Senior	Clarkson	20	1,242	13	6	1	30	5	.930	1.45

== Awards ==
=== WCHA ===
==== Individual awards ====
WCHA Individual Awards
Award	Recipient
Player of the Year	Casey O'Brien
Forward of the Year	Casey O'Brien
Defensive Player of the Year	Caroline Harvey
Rookie of the Year	Caitlin Kraemer
Goaltender of the Year	Ève Gascon
Outstanding Student-Athlete of the Year	Clara Van Wieren
Scoring Champion	Casey O'Brien
Goaltending Champion	Ava McNaughton
Coach of the Year	Mark Johnson

==== All-WCHA teams ====
All-WCHA Conference Teams
Team	Position	Player	Collegiate Team
First Team	F	Laila Edwards	Wisconsin
First Team	F	Casey O'Brien	Wisconsin
First Team	F	Kirsten Simms	Wisconsin
First Team	D	Emma Peschel	Ohio State
First Team	D	Caroline Harvey	Wisconsin
First Team	G	Ève Gascon	Minnesota Duluth
Second Team	F	Abbey Murphy	Minnesota
Second Team	F	Joy Dunne	Ohio State
Second Team	F	Lacey Eden	Wisconsin
Second Team	D	Sydney Morrow	Minnesota
Second Team	D	Tova Henderson	Minnesota Duluth
Second Team	D	Nina Jobst-Smith	Minnesota Duluth
Second Team	G	Ava McNaughton	Wisconsin
Third Team	F	Olivia Mobley	Minnesota Duluth
Third Team	F	Clara Van Wieren	Minnesota Duluth
Third Team	F	Jocelyn Amos	Ohio State
Third Team	D	Chloe Primerano	Minnesota
Third Team	D	Laney Potter	Wisconsin
Third Team	G	Sanni Ahola	St. Cloud State
Rookie Team	F	Caitlin Kraemer	Minnesota Duluth
Rookie Team	F	Jordyn Petrie	Ohio State
Rookie Team	F	Maggie Scannell	Wisconsin
Rookie Team	D	Chloe Primerano	Minnesota
Rookie Team	D	Gracie Graham	Minnesota
Rookie Team	G	Emilia Kyrkkö	St. Cloud State

=== AHA ===
==== Individual awards ====
AHA Individual Awards
Award	Recipient
Player of the Year	Tessa Janecke
Rookie of the Year	Julia Schalin
Forward of the Year	Tessa Janecke
Defenseman of the Year	Kendall Butze
Goalie of the Year	Katie DeSa
Goaltending Champion	Katie DeSa
Defensive Forward of the Year	Jordyn Bear
Scoring Champion	Tessa Janecke
Sportsmanship Award	Marielle Parks
Scholar Athlete of the Year	Tatum White
Coach of the Year	Jeff Kampersal

==== All-AHA Teams ====
All-AHA Conference Teams
Team	Position	Player	Collegiate Team
First Team	F	Tessa Janecke	Penn State
First Team	F	Vanessa Upson	Mercyhurst
First Team	F	Katelyn Roberts	Penn State
First Team	D	Kendall Butze	Penn State
First Team	D	Emma Pickering	RIT
First Team	G	Katie DeSa	Penn State
Second Team	F	Brynn Saarela	Syracuse
Second Team	F	Maddy Christian	Penn State
Second Team	F	Morgan Neitzke	Lindenwood
Second Team	D	Lyndie Lobdell	Penn State
Second Team	D	Megan McKay	Mercyhurst
Second Team	G	Allie Kelley	Syracuse
Rookie Team	F	Julia Schalin	Mercyhurst
Rookie Team	F	Grace Outwater	Penn State
Rookie Team	F	Brac Kelley	RIT
Rookie Team	D	Grace Tullock	Penn State
Rookie Team	D	Jessica Cheung	Syracuse
Rookie Team	G	Magdalena Luggin	Mercyhurst

=== NEWHA ===
==== Individual awards ====
NEWHA Individual Awards
Award	Recipient
Player of the Year	Julia Wysocki
Rookie of the Year	Rowyn Ringor
Defenseman of the Year	Hannah Saunders
Goalie of the Year	Maggie Korneta
Coach of the Year	Kelly Nash

==== All-NEWHA teams ====
All-NEWHA Conference Teams
Team	Position	Player	Collegiate Team
First Team	F	Grace Babington	LIU
First Team	F	Jeannie Wallner	LIU
First Team	F	Julia Wysocki	Post
First Team	D	Anna Fairman	LIU
First Team	D	Maggie Korneta	Franklin Pierce
First Team	G	Hannah Saunders	Post
Second Team	F	Isabella Chaput	Sacred Heart
Second Team	F	Bailey Feeney	Stonehill
Second Team	F	Mikayla Kelley	Franklin Pierce
Second Team	F	Tyra Turner	Saint Anselm
Second Team	F	Rowyn Ringor	Post
Second Team	D	Bri Eid	LIU
Second Team	D	Sydney Russell	Stonehill
Second Team	G	Abbie Thompson	LIU
Rookie Team	F	Bo Dean	Franklin Pierce
Rookie Team	F	Ella Holm	Sacred Heart
Rookie Team	F	Brynn Levinson	Franklin Pierce
Rookie Team	F	Rowyn Ringor	Post
Rookie Team	G	Alexsa Caron	Stonehill
Rookie Team	G	Jordana DeMarinis	Saint Michael's
Sportswomanship Team	F	Alicia McDonald	Saint Michael's
Sportswomanship Team	F	Ava McGaffigan	Assumption
Sportswomanship Team	F	Kerryn O'Connell	Sacred Heart
Sportswomanship Team	F	Alexis Poppleton	Saint Anselm
Sportswomanship Team	F	Makenna Slocum	Stonehill
Sportswomanship Team	D	Sam Mathe	LIU
Sportswomanship Team	D	Julia Stevens	Franklin Pierce
Sportswomanship Team	G	Hannah Saunders	Post

=== WHEA ===
==== Individual awards ====
Hockey East Individual Awards
Award	Recipient
Cammi Granato Award (Player of the Year)	Reichen Kirchmair
Pro Ambitions Rookie of the Year	Claire Murdoch
Hockey East Coach of the Year	Chris MacKenzie
Best Defensive Forward	Hannah Johnson
Best Defenseman	Tamara Giaquinto
Goaltender of the Year	Tia Chan
Sportmanship Award	Raice Szott
Army ROTC Three Stars Award	Grace Campbell
Scoring Champion	Reichen Kirchmair

==== All-WHEA teams ====
All-Hockey East Conference Teams
Team	Position	Player	Collegiate Team
First Team	F	Julia Pellerin	Boston College
First Team	F	Reichen Kirchmair	Providence
First Team	F	Audrey Knapp	Providence
First Team	D	Tamara Giaquinto	Boston University
First Team	D	Ava Rinker	UConn
First Team	G	Tia Chan	UConn
Second Team	F	Sammy Taber	Boston College
Second Team	F	Claire Murdoch	UConn
Second Team	F	Skylar Irving	Northeastern
Second Team	D	Molly Jordan	Boston College
Second Team	D	Brooke Becker	Providence
Second Team	G	Abby Hornung	Holy Cross
Third Team	F	Sydney Healey	Boston University
Third Team	F	Ashley Allard	UConn
Third Team	F	Jada Habisch	UConn
Third Team	F	Kira Juodikis	New Hampshire
Third Team	D	Tuva Kandell	Northeastern
Third Team	D	Ashley Kokavec	Vermont
Third Team	G	Hope Walinski	Providence
Rookie Team	F	Lauren Glaser	Boston College
Rookie Team	F	Claire Murdoch	UConn
Rookie Team	F	Chloe Goofers	Merrimack
Rookie Team	F	Eloise Caron	Northeastern
Rookie Team	D	Tuva Kandell	Northeastern
Rookie Team	D	Olivia Maffeo	Boston College
Rookie Team	G	Lisa Jönsson	Northeastern

=== ECAC ===
==== Individual awards ====
Award	Recipient
Player of the Year	Haley Winn
Forward of the Year	Issy Wunder
Defender of the Year	Haley Winn
Rookie of the Year	Lindzi Avar
Goaltender of the Year	Annelies Bergmann
Mandi Schwartz Student-Athlete of the Year	Maren Friday
Coach of the Year	Doug Derraugh

==== All-ECAC teams ====
All-ECAC Conference Teams
Team	Position	Player	Collegiate Team
First Team	F	Issy Wunder	Princeton
First Team	F	Kristýna Kaltounková	Colgate
First Team	F	Anne Cherkowski	Clarkson
First Team	D	Nicole Gosling	Clarkson
First Team	D	Haley Winn	Clarkson
First Team	G	Annelies Bergmann	Cornell
Second Team	F	Elyssa Biederman	Colgate
Second Team	F	Abby Hustler	St. Lawrence
Second Team	F	Sarah Paul	Princeton
Second Team	D	Ashley Messier	Cornell
Second Team	D	Kendall Cooper	Quinnipiac
Second Team	G	Hannah Murphy	Colgate
Third Team	F	Avi Adam	Cornell
Third Team	F	Anna Segedi	St. Lawrence
Third Team	F	Emma Pais	Colgate
Third Team	D	Andrea Trnková	RPI
Third Team	D	Rory Guilday	Cornell
Third Team	G	Emma-Sofie Nordstrøm	St. Lawrence
Rookie Team	F	Mackenzie Alexander	Princeton
Rookie Team	F	Lindzi Avar	Cornell
Rookie Team	F	Karianne Engelbert	Union
Rookie Team	F	Monique Lyons	Brown
Rookie Team	D	Makayla Watson	Quinnipiac
Rookie Team	D	Rosie Klein	Princeton
Rookie Team	G	Michaela Hesová	Dartmouth

=== Individual awards ===
==== Table key ====
Key of colors and symbols
Color/symbol	Explanation
†	Winner

==== Patty Kazmaier Award ====
Patty Kazmaier Award Finalists
Player	Position	School
Casey O'Brien†	Forward	Wisconsin Top Three
Laila Edwards	Forward	Wisconsin Top Three
Caroline Harvey	Defense	Wisconsin Top Three
Joy Dunne	Forward	Ohio State
Tessa Janecke	Forward	Penn State
Kristýna Kaltounková	Forward	Colgate
Abbey Murphy	Forward	Minnesota
Kirsten Simms	Forward	Wisconsin
Haley Winn	Defense	Clarkson
Issy Wunder	Forward	Princeton

==== AHCA Coach of the Year ====
AHCA Coach of the Year Finalists
Coach	School
Mark Johnson†	Wisconsin
Doug Derraugh	Cornell
Brad Frost	Minnesota
Jeff Kampersal	Penn State
Chris MacKenzie	UConn
Nadine Muzerall	Ohio State
Kelly Nash	LIU

==== Goalie of the Year ====
Goalie of the Year Finalists
Player	School
Ava McNaughton†	Wisconsin
Annelies Bergmann	Cornell
Ève Gascon	Minnesota Duluth

==== Julie Chu Rookie of the Year Award ====
Julie Chu Rookie of the Year Award Finalists
Player	Position	School
Caitlin Kraemer†	Forward	Minnesota Duluth
Claire Murdoch	Forward	UConn Runner Up
