= 2024–25 NCAA Division I women's ice hockey rankings =

Women's ice hockey rankings

- NCAA tournament: 2025
- Preseason No. 1 (USCHO): Ohio State
- Preseason No. 1 (USA Hockey): Wisconsin
- NCAA Division I women's ice hockey rankings

Two polls make up the 2024–25 NCAA Division I women's ice hockey rankings, the USCHO.com poll and the USA Hockey/The Rink Live poll. As the 2024–25 season progresses, rankings are updated weekly.

== Legend ==
	Increase in ranking
	Decrease in ranking
	Not ranked previous week
Italics	Number of first place votes
(#-#)	Win–loss–tie record
т	Tied with team above or below also with this symbol

== USCHO ==
	Preseason Sep 16	Week 1 Sep 30	Week 2 Oct 7	Week 3 Oct 14	Week 4 Oct 21	Week 5 Oct 28	Week 6 Nov 4	Week 7 Nov 11	Week 8 Nov 18	Week 9 Nov 25	Week 10 Dec 2	Week 11 Dec 9	Week 12 Jan 6	Week 13 Jan 13	Week 14 Jan 20	Week 15 Jan 27	Week 16 Feb 3	Week 17 Feb 10	Week 18 Feb 17	Week 19 Feb 24	Week 20 Mar 3	Week 21 Mar 10	Final Mar 24	
1.	Ohio State (14)	Wisconsin (2–0–0) (17)	Wisconsin (4–0–0) (19)	Wisconsin (6–0–0) (20)	Wisconsin (8–0–0) (20)	Wisconsin (10–0–0) (20)	Wisconsin (12–0–0) (20)	Wisconsin (12–0–0) (20)	Wisconsin (13–1–0) (20)	Wisconsin (15–1–0) (20)	Wisconsin (17–1–0) (20)	Wisconsin (19–1–0) (20)	Wisconsin (20–1–1) (20)	Wisconsin (22–1–1) (20)	Wisconsin (24–1–1) (20)	Wisconsin (25–1–2) (20)	Wisconsin (27–1–2) (20)	Wisconsin (29–1–2) (20)	Wisconsin (29–1–2) (20)	Wisconsin (31–1–2) (20)	Wisconsin (33–1–2) (20)	Wisconsin (35–1–2) (20)	Wisconsin (38–1–2) (20)	1.
2.	Wisconsin (4)	Minnesota (2–0–0) (2)	Minnesota (4–0–0) (1)	Ohio State (5–2–1)	Ohio State (6–2–2)	Ohio State (9–2–2)	Ohio State (11–2–2)	Ohio State (11–2–2)	Ohio State (12–3–2)	Ohio State (13–4–2)	Ohio State (13–4–2)	Ohio State (13–4–2)	Ohio State (13–5–3)	Ohio State (15–5–3)	Ohio State (17–5–3)	Ohio State (20–5–3)	Ohio State (21–6–3)	Ohio State (23–6–3)	Ohio State (23–6–3)	Ohio State (25–6–3)	Ohio State (27–6–3)	Ohio State (27–7–3)	Ohio State (29–8–3)	2.
3.	Minnesota (2)	Minnesota Duluth (2–0–0)	Minnesota Duluth (3–1–0)	Minnesota (4–1–1)	Clarkson (6–0–0)	Minnesota (6–3–1)	Minnesota (8–3–1)	Minnesota (8–3–1)	Minnesota (10–3–1)	Minnesota (11–4–1)	Minnesota (11–4–1)	Minnesota (13–4–1)	Minnesota (15–5–1)	Minnesota (17–5–1)	Minnesota (19–5–1)	Minnesota (21–5–1)	Minnesota (22–6–1)	Minnesota (22–8–1)	Cornell (20–4–5)	Cornell (20–4–5)	Cornell (22–4–5)	Cornell (24–4–5)	Cornell (25–5–5)	3.
4.	Colgate	Ohio State (2–2–0) (1)	Ohio State (4–2–0)	Clarkson (6–0–0)	Minnesota (4–3–1)	Minnesota Duluth (5–3–0)	Minnesota Duluth (6–3–1)	Minnesota Duluth (6–3–1)	Minnesota Duluth (6–5–1)	Minnesota Duluth (8–5–1)	Minnesota Duluth (10–5–1)	Minnesota Duluth (11–5–2)	Minnesota Duluth (13–5–2)	Minnesota Duluth (15–5–2)	Minnesota Duluth (15–7–2)	Colgate (22–6–0)	Cornell (17–4–4)	Cornell (19–4–4)	Minnesota (23–9–1)	Minnesota (25–9–1)	Minnesota (27–10–1)	Minnesota (26–11–1)	Minnesota (29–12–1)	4.
5.	Clarkson	Clarkson (2–0–0)	Clarkson (4–0–0)	Minnesota Duluth (3–3–0)	Minnesota Duluth (5–3–0)	Clarkson (6–2–0)	Colgate (9–3–0)	Colgate (11–3–0)	Colgate (13–3–0)	Colgate (14–4–0)	Colgate (16–4–0)	Colgate (16–4–0)	Colgate (17–5–0)	Colgate (18–6–0)	Colgate (20–6–0)	Cornell (15–4–4)	Colgate (24–6–0)	Colgate (25–7–0)	Colgate (27–7–0)	Colgate (27–7–0)	Colgate (29–7–0)	Colgate (30–8–0)	Colgate (30–9–0)	5.
6.	Cornell	Cornell (0–0–0)	Cornell (0–0–0)	Cornell (0–0–0)	St. Lawrence (5–3–0)	Colgate (7–3–0)	Clarkson (7–3–0)	Clarkson (9–3–0)	Clarkson (10–3–1)	Clarkson (12–3–1)	Clarkson (14–3–1)	Clarkson (16–3–1)	Cornell (10–3–3)	Cornell (11–4–3)	Cornell (14–4–3)	Minnesota Duluth (15–9–2)	Minnesota Duluth (15–11–2)	Minnesota Duluth (17–11–2)	Minnesota Duluth (19–11–2)	Minnesota Duluth (19–13–2)	Minnesota Duluth (21–13–2)	Minnesota Duluth (21–14–2)	Minnesota Duluth (22–15–2)	6.
7.	Minnesota Duluth	Colgate (1–1–0)	Colgate (2–2–0)	St. Lawrence (4–2–0)	Colgate (5–3–0)	St. Lawrence (6–3–1)	Quinnipiac (8–3–1)	Quinnipiac (10–3–1)	Quinnipiac (11–3–1)	Cornell (7–3–2)	Cornell (8–3–2)	Cornell (8–3–2)	Clarkson (16–5–1)	Clarkson (18–5–1)	St. Lawrence (15–6–5)	St. Lawrence (16–7–5)	St. Lawrence (16–9–5)	St. Lawrence (18–9–5)	St. Lawrence (19–10–5)	St. Lawrence (19–10–5)	St. Lawrence (21–10–5)	Penn State (31–5–1)	St. Lawrence (22–12–5)	7.
8.	St. Lawrence	St. Lawrence (1–0–0)	St. Lawrence (1–2–0)	Connecticut (3–3–0)	St. Cloud State (6–1–1)	St. Cloud State (7–1–2)	St. Lawrence (7–4–1)	St. Cloud State (7–3–2)	Cornell (6–3–1)	St. Cloud State (9–5–2)	St. Cloud State (10–5–3)	St. Cloud State (10–6–4)	St. Lawrence (12–5–5)	St. Lawrence (14–5–5)	Penn State (21–4–1)	Penn State (23–4–1)	Penn State (25–4–1)	Clarkson (20–10–2)	Penn State (28–5–1)	Penn State (28–5–1)	Penn State (30–5–1)	St. Lawrence (21–11–5)	Penn State (31–6–1)	8.
9.	Connecticut	Connecticut (0–2–0)	Connecticut (1–3–0)	Colgate (3–3–0)	Quinnipiac (6–2–0)	Cornell (1–2–1)	St. Cloud State (7–3–2)	St. Lawrence (8–4–2)	St. Lawrence (8–5–3)	Quinnipiac (11–4–2)	Quinnipiac (12–4–3)	Quinnipiac (13–5–3)	Quinnipiac (15–5–3)	Penn State (19–4–1)	Clarkson (18–7–1)	Clarkson (19–8–1)	Quinnipiac (18–8–4)	Penn State (26–5–1)	Clarkson (22–10–2)	Clarkson (22–10–2)	Clarkson (24–11–2)	Clarkson (24–12–2)	Clarkson (25–13–2)	9.
10.	Quinnipiac	Quinnipiac (2–0–0)	Quinnipiac (3–1–0)	Quinnipiac (4–1–0)	Connecticut (4–4–0)	Connecticut (4–4–0)	Connecticut (6–4–0)	Cornell (4–3–1)	St. Cloud State (8–4–2)	St. Lawrence (9–5–4)	Boston College (11–5–0)	St. Lawrence (11–5–4)	St. Cloud State (10–6–4)	Quinnipiac (15–6–3)	Quinnipiac (15–8–3)	Quinnipiac (16–8–4)	Clarkson (19–10–1)	Quinnipiac (18–10–4)	Quinnipiac (20–10–4)	Quinnipiac (21–10–4)	Quinnipiac (22–10–4)	Quinnipiac (22–12–4)	Quinnipiac (22–12–4)	10.
11.	St. Cloud State	St. Cloud State (2–0–0)	St. Cloud State (4–0–0)	St. Cloud State (6–0–0)	Cornell (0–1–1)	Quinnipiac (6–3–1)	Cornell (2–3–1)	Boston College (8–3–0)	Boston College (9–4–0)	Boston College (10–5–0)	St. Lawrence (9–5–4)	Boston College (12–6–0)	Penn State (17–4–1)	St. Cloud State (10–8–4)	St. Cloud State (12–8–4)	St. Cloud State (12–9–5)	St. Cloud State (13–10–5)	St. Cloud State (14–10–6)	St. Cloud State (15–11–6)	St. Cloud State (15–13–6)	Connecticut (22–11–2)	Boston University (24–11–2)	Boston University (24–12–2)	11.
12.	Penn State	Penn State (1–1–0)	Penn State (2–2–0)	Penn State (4–2–0)	Penn State (6–2–0)	Penn State (7–3–0)	Penn State (9–3–0)	Penn State (9–3–0)	Penn State (11–3–0)	Penn State (13–3–0)	Penn State (13–4–1)	Penn State (15–4–1)	Boston College (13–6–1)	Boston College (14–6–1)	Boston College (15–7–1)	Boston College (17–8–1)	Princeton (16–8–1)	Princeton (16–9–2)	Boston University (21–9–2)	Connecticut (21–11–2)	St. Cloud State (15–15–6)	St. Cloud State (15–15–6)	St. Cloud State (15–15–6)	12.
13.	Northeastern	Northeastern (1–1–0)	Northeastern (2–2–0)	Northeastern (3–3–0)	Princeton (2–0–0)	Boston College (5–3–0)	Boston College (6–3–0)	Connecticut (6–6–0)	Boston University (10–4–1)	Boston University (10–4–1)	Boston University (10–5–1)	Boston University (11–5–1)	Boston University (12–5–1)	Princeton (13–6–0)	Princeton (13–8–0)	Princeton (14–8–1)	Northeastern (18–9–1)	Boston University (20–9–1)	Princeton (17–10–2)	Princeton (18–10–2)	Boston University (22–11–2)	Connecticut (22–12–2)	Connecticut (22–12–2)	13.
14.	Princeton	Princeton (0–0–0)	Princeton (0–0–0)	Princeton (0–0–0)	Northeastern (4–3–1)	Yale (2–0–1)	Brown (6–0–0)	Boston University (9–3–1)	Connecticut (8–6–0)	Connecticut (9–7–0)	Yale (6–5–2)	Princeton (9–5–0)	Princeton (12–5–0)	Boston University (13–6–1)	Connecticut (14–8–2)	Northeastern (17–8–1)	Boston University (18–8–1)	Connecticut (19–9–2)	Northeastern (19–12–1)	Boston University (21–11–2)	Princeton (18–12–2)	Princeton (18–12–2)	Princeton (18–12–2)	14.
15.	Yale	Mercyhurst (1–1–0)	Mercyhurst (1–3–0)	Yale (0–0–0)	Mercyhurst (2–5–1)	Brown (4–0–0)	Boston University (8–3–0)	Brown (6–2–0)	Northeastern (9–5–1)	Northeastern (9–5–1)	Connecticut (10–8–0)	Connecticut (12–8–0)	Connecticut (13–8–1)	Connecticut (13–8–1) т Northeastern (13–6–1) т	Northeastern (14–8–1)	Connecticut (16–8–2)	Boston College (17–10–1)	Northeastern (18–11–1)	Boston College (19–12–1)	Boston College (20–12–2)	Boston College (21–12–2)	Northeastern (22–14–1)	Northeastern (22–14–1)	15.
	Preseason Sep 16	Week 1 Sep 30	Week 2 Oct 7	Week 3 Oct 14	Week 4 Oct 21	Week 5 Oct 28	Week 6 Nov 4	Week 7 Nov 11	Week 8 Nov 18	Week 9 Nov 25	Week 10 Dec 2	Week 11 Dec 9	Week 12 Jan 6	Week 13 Jan 13	Week 14 Jan 20	Week 15 Jan 27	Week 16 Feb 3	Week 17 Feb 10	Week 18 Feb 17	Week 19 Feb 24	Week 20 Mar 3	Week 21 Mar 10	Final Mar 24	
		Dropped: Yale	None	Dropped: Mercyhurst	Dropped: Yale	Dropped: Princeton; Northeastern; Mercyhurst	Dropped: Yale	None	Dropped: Brown	None	Dropped: Northeastern	Dropped: Yale	None	None	Dropped: Boston University	None	Dropped: Connecticut	Dropped: Boston College	Dropped: Connecticut	Dropped: Northeastern	None	Dropped: Boston College	None	

== USA Hockey ==
	Preseason Sep 17	Week 1 Sep 24	Week 2 Oct 1	Week 3 Oct 8	Week 4 Oct 15	Week 5 Oct 22	Week 6 Oct 29	Week 7 Nov 5	Week 8 Nov 12	Week 9 Nov 19	Week 10 Nov 26	Week 11 Dec 3	Week 12 Dec 10	Week 13 Dec 17	Week 14 Jan 7	Week 15 Jan 14	Week 16 Jan 21	Week 17 Jan 28	Week 18 Feb 4	Week 19 Feb 11	Week 20 Feb 18	Week 21 Feb 25	Week 22 Mar 4	Week 23 Mar 11	Week 24 Mar 18	Final Mar 25	
1.	Wisconsin (8)	Wisconsin (0–0–0) (17)	Wisconsin (2–0–0) (18)	Wisconsin (4–0–0) (18)	Wisconsin (6–0–0) (19)	Wisconsin (8–0–0) (19)	Wisconsin (10–0–0) (19)	Wisconsin (12–0–0) (19)	Wisconsin (12–0–0) (19)	Wisconsin (13–1–0) (19)	Wisconsin (15–1–0) (19)	Wisconsin (17–1–0) (19)	Wisconsin (19–1–0) (19)	Wisconsin (19–1–0) (19)	Wisconsin (20–1–1) (19)	Wisconsin (22–1–1) (19)	Wisconsin (24–1–1) (19)	Wisconsin (25–1–2) (19)	Wisconsin (27–1–2) (19)	Wisconsin (29–1–2) (19)	Wisconsin (29–1–2) (19)	Wisconsin (31–1–2) (19)	Wisconsin (33–1–2) (19)	Wisconsin (35–1–2) (19)	Wisconsin (36–1–2) (19)	Wisconsin (38–1–2) (19)	1.
2.	Ohio State (10)	Minnesota (0–0–0)	Minnesota (2–0–0)	Minnesota (4–0–0)	Ohio State (5–2–1)	Ohio State (6–2–2)	Ohio State (9–2–2)	Ohio State (11–2–2)	Ohio State (11–2–2)	Ohio State (12–3–2)	Ohio State (13–4–2)	Ohio State (13–4–2)	Ohio State (13–4–2)	Ohio State (13–4–2)	Ohio State (13–5–3)	Ohio State (15–5–3)	Ohio State (17–5–3)	Ohio State (20–5–3)	Ohio State (21–6–3)	Ohio State (23–6–3)	Ohio State (23–6–3)	Ohio State (25–6–3)	Ohio State (27–6–3)	Ohio State (27–7–3)	Ohio State (28–7–3)	Ohio State (29–8–3)	2.
3.	Minnesota	Clarkson (0–0–0)	Clarkson (2–0–0)	Clarkson (4–0–0)	Clarkson (6–0–0)	Clarkson (6–0–0)	Minnesota (6–3–1)	Minnesota (8–3–1)	Minnesota (8–3–1)	Minnesota (10–3–1)	Minnesota (11–4–1)	Minnesota (11–4–1)	Minnesota (13–4–1)	Minnesota (13–4–1)	Minnesota (15–5–1)	Minnesota (17–5–1)	Minnesota (19–5–1)	Minnesota (21–5–1)	Minnesota (22–6–1)	Minnesota (22–8–1)	Cornell (20–4–5)	Cornell (20–4–5)	Cornell (22–4–5)	Cornell (24–4–5)	Cornell (25–4–5)	Cornell (25–5–5)	3.
4.	Clarkson	Minnesota Duluth (2–0–0) (2)	Minnesota Duluth (2–0–0) (1)	Minnesota Duluth (3–1–0) (1)	Minnesota (4–1–1)	Minnesota (4–3–1)	Minnesota Duluth (5–3–0)	Minnesota Duluth (6–3–1)	Minnesota Duluth (6–3–1)	Minnesota Duluth (8–5–1)	Minnesota Duluth (8–5–1)	Minnesota Duluth (10–5–1)	Minnesota Duluth (11–5–2)	Minnesota Duluth (11–5–2)	Minnesota Duluth (13–5–2)	Minnesota Duluth (15–5–2)	Minnesota Duluth (15–7–2)	Colgate (22–6–0)	Cornell (17–4–4)	Cornell (19–4–4)	Minnesota (23–9–1)	Minnesota (25–9–1)	Minnesota (27–10–1)	Minnesota (26–11–1)	Minnesota (29–11–1)	Minnesota (29–12–1)	4.
5.	Colgate	Ohio State (0–2–0)	Ohio State (2–2–0)	Ohio State (4–2–0)	Minnesota Duluth (3–3–0)	Minnesota Duluth (5–3–0)	Clarkson (6–2–0)	Colgate (9–3–0)	Colgate (11–3–0)	Colgate (13–3–0)	Colgate (14–4–0)	Colgate (16–4–0)	Colgate (16–4–0)	Colgate (16–4–0)	Colgate (17–5–0)	Colgate (18–6–0)	Colgate (20–6–0)	Cornell (15–4–4)	Colgate (24–6–0)	Colgate (25–7–0)	Colgate (27–7–0)	Colgate (27–7–0)	Colgate (29–7–0)	Colgate (30–8–0)	Colgate (30–9–0)	Colgate (30–9–0)	5.
6.	Cornell	Colgate (0–0–0)	Cornell (0–0–0)	Colgate (2–2–0)	Cornell (0–0–0)	Colgate (5–3–0)	Colgate (5–3–0)	Clarkson (7–3–0)	Clarkson (9–3–0)	Clarkson (10–3–1)	Clarkson (12–3–1)	Clarkson (14–3–1)	Clarkson (16–3–1)	Clarkson (16–3–1)	Cornell (10–3–3)	Cornell (11–4–3)	Cornell (14–4–3)	Minnesota Duluth (15–9–2)	Minnesota Duluth (15–11–2)	Minnesota Duluth (17–11–2)	Minnesota Duluth (19–11–2)	Minnesota Duluth (19–13–2)	Minnesota Duluth (21–13–2)	Minnesota Duluth (21–14–2)	Minnesota Duluth (22–15–2)	Minnesota Duluth (22–15–2)	6.
7.	Minnesota Duluth (1)	Cornell (0–0–0)	Colgate (1–1–0)	Cornell (0–0–0)	St. Lawrence (4–2–0)	St. Cloud State (6–1–1)	St. Cloud State (7–1–2) т	Quinnipiac (8–3–0)	Quinnipiac (10–3–1)	Quinnipiac (11–3–1)	Quinnipiac (11–4–2)	Quinnipiac (12–4–3)	Cornell (8–3–2)	Cornell (8–3–2)	Clarkson (16–5–1)	Clarkson (18–5–1)	St. Lawrence (15–6–5)	St. Lawrence (16–7–5)	St. Lawrence (16–9–5)	St. Lawrence (18–9–5)	St. Lawrence (19–10–5)	St. Lawrence (19–10–5)	St. Lawrence (21–10–5)	St. Lawrence (21–11–5)	St. Lawrence (22–12–5)	St. Lawrence (22–12–5)	7.
8.	St. Lawrence	St. Lawrence (0–0–0)	St. Lawrence (1–0–0)	St. Lawrence (1–2–0)	Colgate (3–3–0)	St. Lawrence (5–3–0)	St. Lawrence (6–3–1) т	St. Lawrence (7–4–1)	St. Cloud State (7–3–2)	Cornell (6–3–1)	St. Cloud State (9–5–2)	Cornell (8–3–2)	St. Cloud State (10–6–4)	Quinnipiac (13–5–3)	Quinnipiac (15–5–3)	St. Lawrence (14–5–5)	Penn State (21–4–1)	Penn State (23–4–1)	Penn State (25–4–1)	Clarkson (20–10–2)	Penn State (28–5–1)	Penn State (28–5–1)	Penn State (30–5–1)	Penn State (31–5–1)	Clarkson (25–13–2)	Clarkson (25–13–2)	8.
9.	Connecticut	Connecticut (0–0–0)	Connecticut (0–2–0) т	Quinnipiac (3–1–0)	Connecticut (3–3–0)	Quinnipiac (6–2–0)	Cornell (1–2–1)	St. Cloud State (7–3–2)	St. Lawrence (8–4–2)	St. Cloud State (8–4–2)	Cornell (7–3–2)	St. Cloud State (10–5–3)	Quinnipiac (13–5–3)	St. Cloud State (10–6–4)	St. Cloud State (10–6–4)	Quinnipiac (15–6–3)	Clarkson (18–7–1)	Clarkson (19–8–1)	Quinnipiac (18–8–4)	Quinnipiac (18–10–4) т	Clarkson (22–10–2)	Clarkson (22–10–2)	Clarkson (24–11–2)	Clarkson (24–12–2)	Penn State (31–6–1)	Penn State (31–6–1)	9.
10.	Quinnipiac	Quinnipiac (0–0–0)	Quinnipiac (2–0–0) т	Connecticut (1–3–0)	St. Cloud State (6–0–0)	Connecticut (4–4–0)	Connecticut (4–4–0)	Connecticut (6–4–0)	Cornell (4–3–1)	St. Lawrence (8–5–3)	St. Lawrence (9–5–4)	Boston College (11–5–0)	St. Lawrence (11–5–4)	St. Lawrence (11–5–4)	St. Lawrence (12–5–5)	Penn State (19–4–1)	Quinnipiac (15–8–3)	St. Cloud State (12–9–5)	Clarkson (19–10–1)	Penn State (26–5–1) т	Quinnipiac (20–10–4) т	Quinnipiac (21–10–4)	Quinnipiac (22–12–4)	Quinnipiac (22–12–4)	Boston University (24–12–2)	Quinnipiac (22–12–4)	10.
11.	St. Cloud State	St. Cloud State (2–0–0)	St. Cloud State (2–0–0)	St. Cloud State (4–0–0)	Quinnipiac (4–1–0)	Princeton (2–0–0)	Quinnipiac (6–3–1)	Penn State (9–3–0)	Penn State (9–3–0)	Boston College (9–4–0)	Penn State (12–3–0)	St. Lawrence (9–5–4)	Boston College (12–6–0)	Penn State (15–4–0)	Penn State (17–4–1)	St. Cloud State (10–8–4)	St. Cloud State (12–8–4)	Quinnipiac (16–8–4)	St. Cloud State (13–10–5)	St. Cloud State (14–10–6)	St. Cloud State (15–11–6) т	St. Cloud State (15–13–6)	St. Cloud State (15–15–6)	Boston University (24–11–2)	Quinnipiac (22–12–4)	Boston University (24–12–2)	11.
12.	Penn State	Penn State (0–0–0)	Penn State (1–1–0)	Penn State (2–2–0) т	Penn State (4–2–0)	Cornell (0–1–1)	Penn State (7–3–0)	Cornell (2–3–1)	Boston College (8–3–0)	Penn State (11–3–0)	Boston College (10–5–0)	Penn State (13–4–0)	Penn State (15–4–0)	Boston College (12–6–0)	Boston College (13–6–1)	Boston College (14–6–1)	Boston College (15–7–1)	Northeastern (17–8–1)	Northeastern (18–9–1)	Boston University (20–9–1)	Boston University (21–9–2)	Connecticut (21–11–2)	Connecticut (22–11–2)	St. Cloud State (15–15–6)	St. Cloud State (15–15–6)	St. Cloud State (15–15–6)	12.
13.	Northeastern	Northeastern (0–0–0)	Northeastern (1–1–0)	Northeastern (2–2–0) т	Northeastern (3–3–0)	Penn State (6–2–0)	Yale (2–0–1)	Boston College (6–3–0)	Boston University (9–3–1)	Boston University (10–4–1)	Boston University (10–4–1)	Boston University (10–5–1)	Boston University (11–5–1)	Princeton (9–5–0)	Boston University (12–5–1)	Princeton (13–6–0)	Princeton (13–8–0)	Boston College (17–8–1)	Princeton (16–8–1)	Princeton (16–9–2)	Boston College (19–12–1)	Boston University (21–11–2)	Boston University (22–11–2)	Connecticut (22–12–2)	Northeastern (22–14–1)	Connecticut (22–12–2)	13.
14.	Princeton	Princeton (0–0–0)	Princeton (0–0–0)	Princeton (0–0–0)	Princeton (0–0–0)	Northeastern (4–3–1)	Boston College (5–3–0)	Brown (6–0–0)	Connecticut (6–6–0)	Connecticut (8–6–0)	Connecticut (9–7–0)	Princeton (8–5–0)	Princeton (9–5–0)	Boston University (11–5–1)	Princeton (12–5–0)	Boston University (13–6–1)	Northeastern (14–8–1)	Princeton (14–8–1)	Boston University (18–8–1)	Connecticut (19–9–2)	Northeastern (19–12–1)	Princeton (18–10–2)	Boston College (21–12–2)	Northeastern (22–14–1)	Connecticut (22–12–2)	Northeastern (22–14–1)	14.
15.	Yale	Yale (0–0–0)	Yale (0–0–0)	Mercyhurst (1–3–0)	Mercyhurst (1–5–0) т Yale (0–0–0) т Boston University (2–3–0) т	Mercyhurst	Princeton (2–2–0)	Boston University (8–3–0)	Brown (6–2–0)	Northeastern (9–5–1)	Northeastern (9–5–1)	Yale (6–5–2)	Connecticut (12–8–0)	Northeastern (10–6–1)	Northeastern (12–6–1)	Northeastern (13–6–1)	Boston University (14–7–1)	Connecticut (16–8–2)	Boston College (17–10–1)	Northeastern (18–11–1)	Princeton (17–10–2)	Boston College (20–12–2)	Princeton (18–12–2)	Boston College (21–13–2)	Boston College (21–13–2)	Boston College (21–13–2)	15.
	Preseason Sep 17	Week 1 Sep 24	Week 2 Oct 1	Week 3 Oct 8	Week 4 Oct 15	Week 5 Oct 22	Week 6 Oct 29	Week 7 Nov 5	Week 8 Nov 12	Week 9 Nov 19	Week 10 Nov 26	Week 11 Dec 3	Week 12 Dec 10	Week 13 Dec 17	Week 14 Jan 7	Week 15 Jan 14	Week 16 Jan 21	Week 17 Jan 28	Week 18 Feb 4	Week 19 Feb 11	Week 20 Feb 18	Week 21 Feb 25	Week 22 Mar 4	Week 23 Mar 11	Week 24 Mar 18	Final Mar 25	
		None	None	Dropped: Yale	None	Dropped: Yale; Boston University	Dropped: Northeastern; Mercyhurst	None	None	Dropped: Brown	None	Dropped: Connecticut; Northeastern	Dropped: Yale	Dropped: Connecticut	None	None	None	Dropped: Boston University	Dropped: Connecticut	Dropped: Boston College	Dropped: Connecticut	Dropped: Northeastern	None	Dropped: Princeton	None	None	
