= 2010–11 Sacred Heart Pioneers women's ice hockey season =

- Conference: Independent
- Home ice: Gutterson Fieldhouse

Rankings
- USA Today/USA Hockey Magazine: Not ranked
- USCHO.com/CBS College Sports: Not ranked

Record

Coaches and captains
- Head coach: Tom O’Malley
- Assistant coaches: J.G. Capozzoli

The 2010-11 Sacred Heart Pioneers season was their eighth season as a Division I Independent.

== Regular season ==
On November 26 and 27, the Pioneers competed in the Nutmeg Classic hosted by the Connecticut Huskies women's ice hockeyprogram. On January 8 and 9, the Pioneers competed in the Neumann Tournament in Aston, Pennsylvania. Other schools included Cortland and Neumann.

=== Schedule ===
Date	Opponent	Time	Score	Result
09/24/2010	@ Maine	7:00 ET		
09/25/2010	@ Maine	2:00 ET		
10/02/2010	@ Rhode Island	3:00 ET		
10/10/2010	@ Quinnipiac	5:00 ET		
10/15/2010	@ Union	7:00 ET		
10/23/2010	Holy Cross	2:00 ET		
10/30/2010	St. Anselm	2:00 ET		
11/06/2010	@ Brown	2:00 ET		
11/09/2010	@ Holy Cross	7:00 ET		
11/13/2010	@ Nichols	7:30 ET		
11/26/2010	@ Quinnipiac (Nutmeg Classic)	4:00 ET		
11/27/2010	vs UConn/Yale (Nutmeg Classic)	4:00/7:00 ET		
12/03/2010	St. Michael's	7:00 ET		
12/04/2010	St. Michael's	2:00 ET		
12/10/2010	@ Oswego	3:00 ET		
12/11/2010	@ Oswego	3:00 ET		
01/04/2011	@ Southern Maine	2:00 ET		
01/05/2011	@ Southern Maine	2:00 ET		
01/08/2011	vs Cortland	7:00 ET		
01/09/2011	vs TBA/Neumann	1:00/4:00 ET		
01/11/2011	Salve Regina	7:00 ET		
01/14/2011	Cortland	7:00 ET		
01/15/2011	Wesleyan	2:00 ET		
01/18/2011	@ Wesleyan	7:00 ET		
01/29/2011	@ Bowdoin	7:30 ET		
01/30/2011	@ Bowdoin	2:00 ET		
02/11/2011	Rhode Island	7:00 ET		
02/12/2011	Rhode Island	2:00 ET		
02/18/2011	@ Neumann	7:00 ET		
02/19/2011	@ Neumann	7:00 ET		
