= List of Vegas Vanguards draft picks =

The Vegas Vanguards are a professional ice hockey team in the Professional Women's Hockey League (PWHL) that was founded ahead of the 2026–27 season as an expansion team. Their first draft pick was Tessa Janecke, selected third overall in the 2026 PWHL Draft. Vegas has participated in one PWHL Draft and have drafted eight players.

== Key ==
General terms and abbreviations
Term or abbreviation	Definition
Draft	The year that the player was selected
Round	The round of the draft in which the player was selected
Pick	The overall position in the draft at which the player was selected
Pos	Position of the player

Position abbreviations
Abbreviation	Definition
G	Goaltender
D	Defense
LW	Left wing
C	Center
RW	Right wing
F	Forward

== Draft picks ==
Full list of PWHL Detroit draft picks
Draft	Round	Pick	Player	Nationality	Pos	School/club team	Conference/league
2026	1	3	Tessa Janecke	United States	F	Penn State University	AHA
2026	1	5	Lacey Eden	United States	F	University of Wisconsin	WCHA
2026	2	13	Issy Wunder	United States	F	Princeton University	ECAC
2026	3	29	Josefin Bouveng	Sweden	F	University of Minnesota	WCHA
2026	4	41	Saskia Maurer	Switzerland	G	SC Bern	PFWL
2026	5	49	Kendall Butze	United States	D	Penn State University	AHA
2026	5	53	Alexis Petford	Canada	F	Colgate University	ECAC
2026	6	65	Sydney Healey	Canada	F	Boston University	Hockey East
