= Annie Bélanger =

Canadian ice hockey goaltender

- Born: February 4, 1994 (age 31); Sherbrooke, Quebec, Canada
- Height: 175 cm (5 ft 9 in)
- Position: Goaltender
- PWHPA team Former teams: Independent; Calgary Inferno; University of Connecticut
- Playing career: 2018–present

Annie Bélanger is a Canadian ice hockey goaltender, currently with the Professional Women's Hockey Players Association (PWHPA).

== Career ==
Bélanger played four seasons at the University of Connecticut. In her final season, she was named Hockey East Goaltender of the Year and a Hockey East First-Team All-Star. She would graduate with the university's all-time record for save percentage.

Bélanger was drafted 17th overall by Calgary in the 2018 Canadian Women's Hockey League (CWHL) Draft. In her rookie CWHL season, she would serve as the team's backup behind Alex Rigsby, posting 8 wins in 9 games. She would earn back-to-back shutouts in her first two games. The team would win the Clarkson Cup that year.

In May 2019, Bélanger joined the PWHPA after the collapse of the CWHL.

== Personal life ==
Bélanger has a degree in finance.

== Career statistics ==
			Regular season									Playoffs
Season	Team	League	GP	W	L	T/OT	MIN	GA	SO	GAA	SV%	GP	W	L	MIN	GA	SO	GAA	SV%
2014–15	University of Connecticut	HE	14	—	—	—	—	—	—	2.65	.926	—	—	—	—	—	—	—	—
2015–16	University of Connecticut	HE	11	—	—	—	—	—	—	2.76	.906	—	—	—	—	—	—	—	—
2016–17	University of Connecticut	HE	32	—	—	—	—	—	—	2.36	.929	—	—	—	—	—	—	—	—
2017–18	University of Connecticut	HE	30	13	—	—	—	—	4	1.84	.938	—	—	—	—	—	—	—	—
2018–19	Calgary Inferno	CWHL	9	8	1	0	518	—	4	1.39	—	—	—	—	—	—	—	—	—
2019–20	Independent	PWHPA	—	—	—	—	—	—	—	—	—	—	—	—	—	—	—	—	—
CWHL totals			9	8	1	0	518	—	4	1.39	—	—	—	—	—	—	—	—	—
