= Jaclyn Hawkins =

Canadian ice hockey player

- Born: February 28, 1985 (age 41) Burlington, Ontario, Canada
- Height: 5 ft 8 in (173 cm)
- Weight: 160 lb (73 kg; 11 st 6 lb)
- Position: Forward
- Played for: Connecticut Huskies (2004–08); ZSC Lions Frauen (2009–10); Boston Blades (2010–12)
- Playing career: 2004–2013

Jaclyn Hawkins (born February 28, 1985) is a Canadian former ice hockey player for the Connecticut Huskies women's ice hockey program, the ZSC Lions Frauen of the Switzerland women's ice hockey league and the Boston Blades of the former CWHL. Hawkins is an entrepreneur and the founder and owner of WomensHockeyLife Ltd, WHL Podcast, WHL Profile, WHL Academy, and WHL Gear.

== Playing career ==
Prior to her NCAA career, Hawkins played at South Carleton High School in the Ottawa, Ontario area with future St. Lawrence Skating Saints women's ice hockey skater Chelsea Grills. In the first eight games of the 2000 season, both Grills and Hawkins averaged four points a game as the South Carleton Storm started the season with an 8–0 record. Hawkins transferred from South Carleton High School so that she could compete for the Taft School and the CT Polar Bears in Connecticut at the age of 15. Hawkins captained both Taft and the Polar Bears during her Senior year, claiming Gold at the 2004 US National Championship.

=== NCAA ===
At the end of her freshman season (2004–05), Hawkins finished second nationally among freshmen in goals scored with 25 and third in points with 40. Her goals and points numbers led the Huskies, while breaking the program's single-season marks for both categories, respectively. In addition, she was a four-time Hockey East Rookie of the Week award winner. Her 18 goals in conference play led all Hockey East skaters. She was a contributing factor in the Huskies reaching the Hockey East championship game as she scored more than a quarter of the Huskies' goals.

On October 21, 2006, she set a Hockey East record (and tied an NCAA record) with three power play goals in one game. This was accomplished versus the Maine Black Bears and was part of a five-point game; it was her second hat trick in five games. In her sophomore and junior campaigns, she was the Huskies' leading scorer (sophomore numbers: 12 goals, 15 assists and 27 points; junior numbers: 18 goals, 18 assists and 36 points).

After her senior season, Hawkins set a program record with 27 assists and finished as the Huskies' all-time leading scorer (69 goals, 75 assists, 144 points). In addition, she became the first Husky to win the Hockey East Sportsmanship Award. Hawkins was captain of the Huskies in her junior and senior seasons, and was an alternate captain during her sophomore season.

=== Europe ===
In 2009–10, she relocated to Zurich, Switzerland and competed for the ZSC Lions. Her 55 points (29 goals, 26 assists) led the Lions, as she helped the squad advance to their first appearance in the Swiss Championship game. In addition, she was selected as one of the Swiss League's Most Valuable Players. Hawkins was selected by the Boston Blades in the 2010 CWHL Draft.

=== Boston Blades ===
Joining the CWHL's Boston Blades during their inaugural season (2010–11), it was a roster that included future Hockey Hall of Fame member Angela Ruggiero, future American Hockey League executive Hayley Moore, and future Toronto Six General Manager Mandy Cronin. Along with a number of USA Hockey alums, including Kacey Bellamy, Caitlin Cahow, Jessica Koizumi and Erika Lawler, Hawkins, wearing number 19, made her debut in Blades colors on January 8, 2011 versus the Brampton Thunder. Appearing in seven games overall, the 2011–12 season saw Hawkins finish ninth in team scoring.

Amassing 11 points in 18 games played, Hawkins, with the #21 adorned on the back of her jersey, enjoyed a three-game scoring streak from February 19 to 26, 2012. Recording six points during said streak, Hawkins recorded her first career hat trick in CWHL play, scoring a goal in every period during a 9–2 triumph on February 19 over the Burlington Barracudas.

Of note, her first career CWHL point took place on December 11, 2011, in a road affair versus the Toronto Furies, logging an assists on a third period goal by Micaela Long. The next game, a December 17, 2011, home affair versus the visiting Brampton Thunder saw Hawkins enjoy her first career goal in the CWHL, logging the game-winner, unassisted, versus goaltender Liz Knox at the 5:36 mark of the second period, part of a 3–1 final.

Making her postseason debut in the 2012 Clarkson Cup, Hawkins appeared in all three round robin games. Recording a goal in her first Clarkson Cup playoff match, a 3–2 loss on March 22, 2012 to the Thunder, she recorded a goal at the 19:19 mark of the third period. Coincidentally, her first playoff goal, akin to her first regular season goal, was also scored on Knox. In the Blades only win at the Clarkson Cup playoffs, a 5–2 victory versus the Toronto Furies, Hawkins and Gigi Marvin contributed the assists on the game's opening goal, scored at the 3:11 mark by Kelli Stack.

Hawkins' final appearance with the Blades took place during the 2012–13 CWHL season, gracing the ice on October 28, 2012 in a road match versus the Toronto Furies, a 2–1 win. That season, the Blades captured the first Clarkson Cup title in franchise history.

== Career stats ==
Hawkins recorded nine power play goals and 3 game-winning goals in her freshman campaign for the Huskies. During a standout junior year, Hawkins logged 10 power play goals, while scoring another three on the power play.

Bold indicates led team in regular season

			Regular season					Playoffs
Season	Team	League	GP	G	A	Pts	PIM	GP	G	A	Pts	PIM
2004–05	UConn Huskies	NCAA; Hockey East	34	25	14	39		—	—	—	—	—
2005–06	UConn Huskies	NCAA; Hockey East	33	12	15	27		—	—	—	—	—
2006–07	UConn Huskies	NCAA; Hockey East	35	18	18	36		—	—	—	—	—
2007–08	UConn Huskies	NCAA; Hockey East	35	14	27	**41**		—	—	—	—	—
2009–10	ZSC Lions Frauen	Swiss	18	**29**	**26**	**55**		—	—	—	—	—
2010–11	Boston Blades	CWHL	7	0	0	0	0	—	—	—	—	—
2011–12	Boston Blades	CWHL	18	5	6	11	4	3	1	1	2	0
2012–13	Boston Blades	CWHL	1	0	0	0	0	—	—	—	—	—
NCAA totals			131	69	73	142	46	-	-	-	-	-	-
Swiss league totals			18	29	26	55	-	-	-	-	-	-
CWHL totals			26	5	6	11	4	3	1	1	2	0

=== Hockey Canada ===
During the 2004–05 season, Hawkins made the Canadian Under-22 Development and Selection Camp as well.

**Year**	**Event**	**GP**	**G**	**A**	**PTS**
2005	Under 22 Development Camp	2	1	1	2

== Awards and honors ==
- 2004–05 Hockey East Rookie of the Year
- 2004–05 Hockey East All-Rookie Team
- 2004–05 Hockey East Second Team
- 2004–05 Hockey East goal scoring champion (18 goals)
- 2004–05 U.S. College Hockey Online (USCHO) Rookie of the Year
- 2004–05 USCHO All-Rookie Team
- Hockey East Player of the Week (Week of October 26, 2006)
- 2007–08 Hockey East's Sportsmanship Award
- 2007–08 New England Hockey Writers Division I Women's All-Star Team
- 2008 Frozen Four Skills Challenge participant
- 2012 Connecticut Huskies Hockey East All-Decade Team member (honored in 2012)
- 2013 Clarkson Cup Champion

== Coaching ==
During the summer seasons of 2006 and 2007, Hawkins worked as an instructor at the TEC-TAC International Hockey School in Carleton Place, Ontario. After graduating from the University of Connecticut in 2008, she joined the coaching staff as an assistant for the 2008–09 season. She helped coach youth hockey in Zurich, Switzerland, in 2010 and upon her return to North America, she was the Director of Player & Organizational Development with the CT Northern Lights.

Hawkins returned behind the bench in 2013 for her alma mater, the UConn Huskies women's ice hockey program, serving on the staff of Chris MacKenzie, a former Ohio State assistant coach, who was also in his first season as Huskies coach. Remaining with the Huskies coaching staff until 2016, among Hawkins' highlights were the Huskies placing 12 student-athletes on the 2013–14 Hockey East All-Academic Team, plus goaltender Elaine Chuli named to the 2016 CCM/AHCA All-America Second Team . During Hawkins' three seasons with the Huskies coaching staff, the squad had a cumulative record of 37 wins, 58 losses and 15 ties, appearing in the Hockey East tournament each season, highlighted by appearances in the semi-finals in 2015 and 2016.

== Women's Hockey Life ==
Hawkins owns a website named Women's Hockey Life (WHL), which focuses on empowering women and girls in hockey while also highlighting, promoting and supporting the game at all levels all over the world. WHL announced a partnership in May 2017 with the Grindstone Hockey Foundation, founded by former Dartmouth Big Green women's ice hockey competitor Danielle Grundy. In June 2019, Hawkins wrote a piece on Women's Hockey Life indicating her same-sex preference.
