= Heather Linstad =

American ice hockey coach (born 1963)

Heather Lindstad
Biographical details
- Born: February 26, 1967 (age 59); Chelmsford, Massachusetts, US

Playing career
- 1985–1989: Providence
- Position: Center

Coaching career (HC unless noted)
- 1992–2000: Northeastern (ECAC)
- 2000–2013: Connecticut (Hockey East)
- 2011–2012: United States U18 team
- 2016–2017: Connecticut Whale (PHF)

Head coaching record
- Overall: 322–289–81 (college); 7–15–1 (pro)

Accomplishments and honors

Championships
- 1982 Hockey East

Awards
- ECAC Player of the Year (1989); Chelmsford High School Hall of Fame (2009)

Records
- 300 wins

Heather Linstad (born February 26, 1963) is an American ice hockey coach, best known for coaching the UConn Huskies women's ice hockey program during 2000 to 2013 and the Connecticut Whale of the Premier Hockey Federation (PHF) during the 2015–16 and 2016–17 seasons.

== Coaching career ==
Prior to beginning her coaching career, she was a college ice hockey player for the Providence Friars women's ice hockey team and was honored as the ECAC Player of the Year in 1989. She was then head coach for eight seasons at Northeastern Huskies from 1992 to 2000, winning the ECAC coach of the year 1994. In 2000, Linstad became the women's ice hockey coach at the University of Connecticut, coaching the Connecticut Huskies for thirteen seasons. On February 13, 2010, Linstad obtained her 300th win as a head coach, with a 4–1 over her alma mater, the Providence Friars. Linstad abruptly resigned from her coaching position at the University of Connecticut on March 13, 2013, after two poor seasons. In 2016, she would be awarded the Women's Hockey Founders Award by the American Hockey Coaches Association for her contributions to the growth and development of women's ice hockey in the United States.

Linstad was the head coach of the United States U-18 women's ice hockey team through the 2011–12 season, coaching the team to a silver medal finish at the 2012 IIHF World Women's U18 Championship.

On January 29, 2016, Lindstad was named as head coach of the Connecticut Whale of the National Women's Hockey League. She left the team after the 2016–17 season.

== Controversy ==
A lawsuit filed against the University of Connecticut alleges Linstad dismissed a female hockey player from the team for not being stable enough following an alleged on-campus sexual assault by a male hockey player in 2011.

== Coaching statistics ==
Team	Season	W	L	T/OTL	Postseason
Northeastern Huskies	1992–93	14	7	3	
Northeastern Huskies	1993–94	19	6	3	
Northeastern Huskies	1994–95	14	12	5	
Northeastern Huskies	1995–96	14	5	5	
Northeastern Huskies	1996–97	27	9	0	
Northeastern Huskies	1997–98	26	6	5	
Northeastern Huskies	1998–99	25	7	3	
Northeastern Huskies	1999–00	22	9	3	
Connecticut Huskies	2000–01	3	10	0	
Connecticut Huskies	2001–02	11	21	3	
Connecticut Huskies	2002–03	11	20	4	
Connecticut Huskies	2003–04	9	19	6	
Connecticut Huskies	2004–05	16	12	8	
Connecticut Huskies	2005–06	12	21	1	
Connecticut Huskies	2006–07	17	15	3	
Connecticut Huskies	2007–08	22	8	5	
Connecticut Huskies	2008–09	19	12	4	
Connecticut Huskies	2009–10	21	9	7	Lost Hockey East final
Connecticut Huskies	2010–11	13	19	3	
Connecticut Huskies	2011–12	4	23	7	
Connecticut Huskies	2012–13	3	29	3	
Connecticut Whale	2015–16	2	3	0	Lost Semifinals, 1–2 vs. Buffalo Beauts
Connecticut Whale	2016–17	5	12	1	Lost Semifinal game, 2–8 vs. Boston Pride

== See also ==
- List of college women's ice hockey career coaching wins leaders
