= Jada Habisch =

American ice hockey player (born 2002)

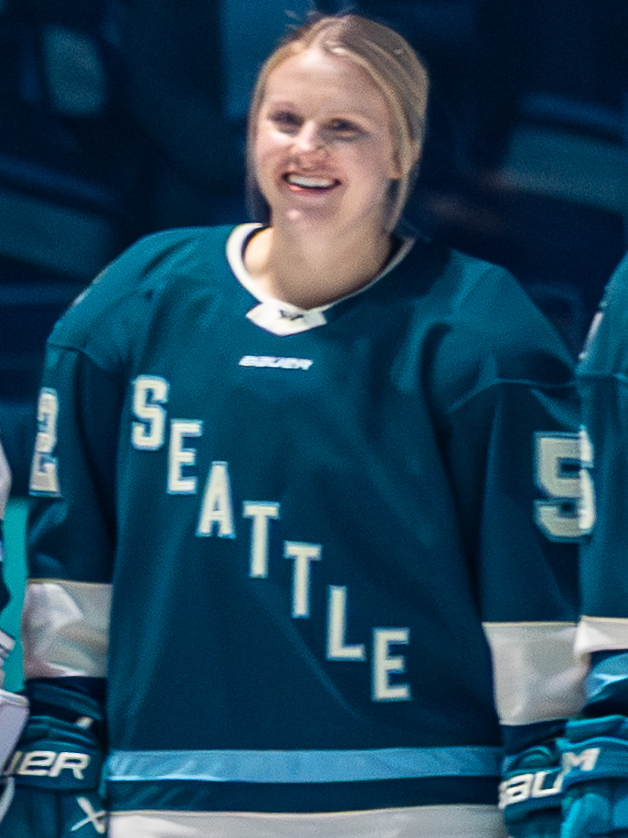
- Habisch with the Seattle Torrent in 2025
- Born: June 25, 2002 (age 24) Buffalo, Minnesota, U.S.
- Height: 5 ft 4 in (163 cm)
- Position: Forward
- Shoots: Right
- PWHL team Former teams: Vegas Vanguards; Seattle Torrent
- Playing career: 2025–present

Jada Habisch (born June 25, 2002) is an American professional ice hockey forward and a reserve player for the Seattle Torrent of the Professional Women's Hockey League (PWHL). She played college ice hockey for the UConn Huskies from 2020 to 2025 and finished third on the program’s all-time goals list with 64.

== Early life ==
Habisch grew up in Buffalo, Minnesota, and captained Buffalo High School for three seasons, earning multiple all-conference and all-section honors before committing to UConn.

== Playing career ==
=== College ===
Habisch appeared in 166 collegiate games for UConn, leading the Huskies in goals in three straight seasons (2022–23 to 2024–25). As a senior in 2023–24 she posted 28 points (17 goals, 11 assists) with eight game-winners, and in 2024–25 she served as a team captain and led UConn with 16 goals while helping secure a second consecutive Hockey East regular-season title. She was named to the 2024–25 Hockey East All-Star Third Team and concluded her career ranked third in program history with 64 goals and among the top six in career points.

=== Professional ===
On June 24, 2025, Habisch was selected in the fourth round, 31st overall, by the Seattle Torrent in the 2025 PWHL Draft. On November 20, 2025, she signed a reserve player contract with the Torrent.

== Personal life ==
Habisch is the daughter of Jeff and Suzette Habisch and has two brothers, Blake and Riley. She is 5 ft 4 in (163 cm) and shoots right-handed.

== Career statistics ==
| | | | Regular season | | | | | Playoffs |
| Season | Team | League | GP | G | A | Pts | PIM | GP | G | A | Pts | PIM |
|---|---|---|---|---|---|---|---|---|---|---|---|---|
| 2020–21 | UConn | Hockey East | 20 | 5 | 5 | 10 | 4 | — | — | — | — | — |
| 2021–22 | UConn | Hockey East | 37 | 13 | 4 | 17 | 14 | — | — | — | — | — |
| 2022–23 | UConn | Hockey East | 35 | 13 | 7 | 20 | 2 | — | — | — | — | — |
| 2023–24 | UConn | Hockey East | 38 | 17 | 11 | 28 | 10 | — | — | — | — | — |
| 2024–25 | UConn | Hockey East | 36 | 16 | 6 | 22 | 17 | — | — | — | — | — |
| 2025–26 | Seattle Torrent | PWHL | 11 | 1 | 0 | 1 | 0 | — | — | — | — | — |
| PWHL totals | | | 11 | 1 | 0 | 1 | 0 | — | — | — | — | — |

== Awards and honours ==
| Honour | Year |
College
| Hockey East All-Rookie Team (Pro Ambitions) | 2021 |
| Hockey East All-Star Third Team | 2025 |
