= Chris MacKenzie (ice hockey) =

American ice hockey coach

Current position
- Title: Head coach
- Team: UConn
- Conference: Hockey East
- Record: 227–186–52

Biographical details
- Born: February 15, 1975 (age 51); Niagara Falls, Ontario, Canada
- Education: Niagara University

Playing career
- 1996–2000: Niagara
- 2000–2001: JYP
- Position: Defenceman

Coaching career (HC unless noted)
- 2001–2008: UMass Lowell (Assistant)
- 2009–2011: Niagara
- 2012–2013: Ohio State (Assistant)
- 2014–present: UConn

Head coaching record
- Overall: 250–217–62

Accomplishments and honors

Awards
- 2× Hockey East Coach of the Year (2024, 2025); AHCA Coach of the Year (2024)

Chris MacKenzie (born February 15, 1975) is a Canadian ice hockey coach. He is the current head coach for UConn. He previously served as the head coach for Niagara.

== Playing career ==
MacKenzie helped start the Niagara Purple Eagles men's ice hockey program in 1996. He captained the Purple Eagles for four seasons and holds several records at Niagara, including the record for most points by a defenseman in one season with 32 points in 2000. Following the season he was named to the All-CHA first team. He is also the program's all-time leader for goals (20), assists (77) and points (97) by a defenseman. Following his collegiate career he played one year for JYP of the SM-liiga.

== Coaching career ==
Following his playing career, MacKenzie served as an assistant coach at UMass Lowell for eight years.

=== Niagara University ===
On May 20, 2009, MacKenzie was named the second head coach at Niagara in program history. He served as head coach for two years and compiled a 24–31–10 record. He resigned as head coach on August 23, 2011.

=== University of Connecticut ===
On May 2, 2013, MacKenzie was named head coach at UConn. On December 15, 2022, he signed a six-year contract extension at UConn. With a win on January 17, 2024, MacKenzie became the winningest coach in program history, surpassing the previous record of 163 wins held by Heather Linstad.

During the 2023–24 season, MacKenzie led the Huskies to a program best 25–8–5 record, and their first Hockey East regular season championship in program history. The Huskies also won the Hockey East tournament and advanced to the NCAA women's ice hockey tournament for the first time in program history. Following an outstanding season, he was named the AHCA Coach of the Year.

== Head coaching record ==
Record table
Season	Team	Overall	Conference	Standing	Postseason
Niagara University (CHA) (2009–2011)
2009–10	Niagara	12–14–5	7–6–3	2nd	
2010–11	Niagara	11–17–5	8–6–2	2nd	
Niagara:		23–31–10			
University of Connecticut (Hockey East) (2013–present)
2013–14	UConn	9–24–2	6–14–1	5th	
2014–15	UConn	11–18–8	5–11–5	5th	
2015–16	UConn	18–15–5	11–10–3	4th	
2016–17	UConn	14–18–4	9–13–2	7th	
2017–18	UConn	16–14–9	7–11–6	8th	
2018–19	UConn	14–18–4	9–14–4	7th	
2019–20	UConn	19–18–2	13–12–2	5th	
2020–21	UConn	9–10–1	8–9–1	7th	
2021–22	UConn	24–9–4	16–7–4	3rd	
2022–23	UConn	18–13–4	12–11–4	5th	
2023–24	UConn	25–8–5	19–4–4	1st	NCAA first round
2024–25	UConn	22–12–2	19–6–2	1st	
2025–26	UConn	28–9–2	17–6–1	2nd	NCAA quarterfinals
UConn:		227–186–52	151–178–39		
Total:		250–217–62			
National champion Postseason invitational champion Conference regular season champion Conference regular season and conference tournament champion Division regular season champion Division regular season and conference tournament champion Conference tournament champion
