= Eagleville, Pennsylvania =

Eagleville is the name of two census-designated places in the U.S. state of Pennsylvania:

- Eagleville, Centre County, Pennsylvania, pop. 324
- Eagleville, Montgomery County, Pennsylvania, pop. 4800
