= Skylar Irving =

American ice hockey player (born 2002)

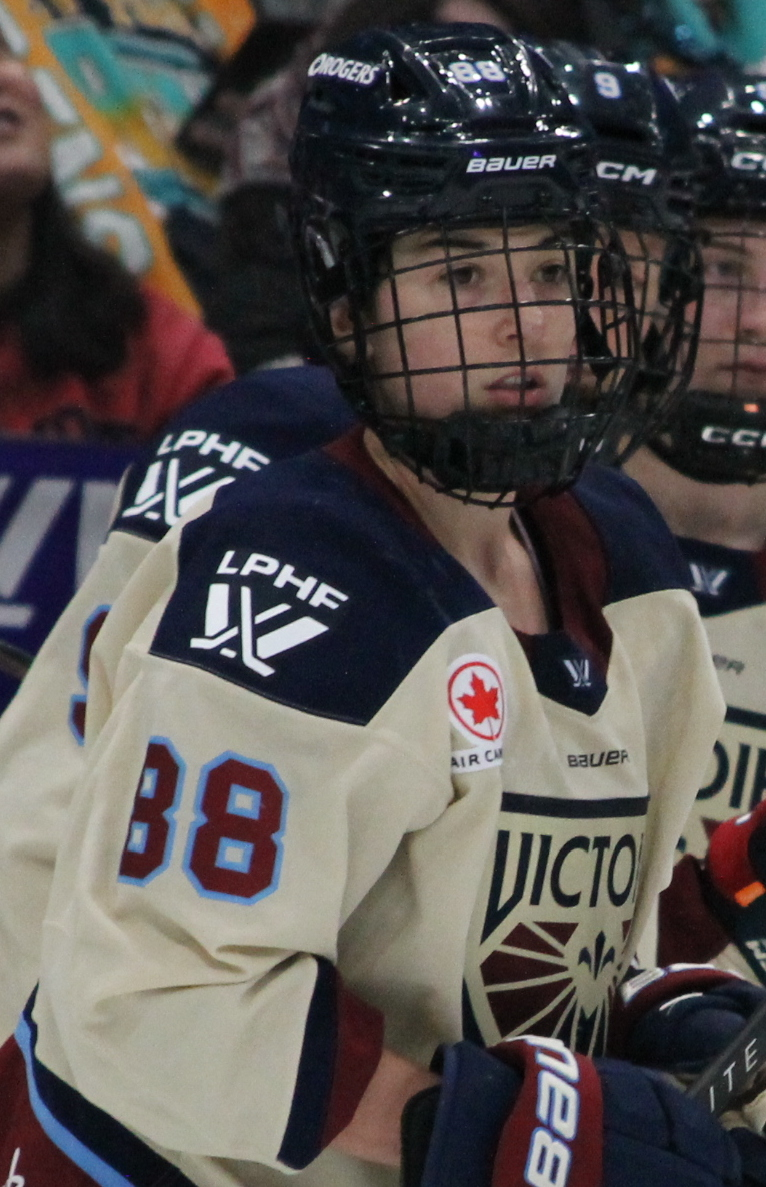
- Irving with the Montreal Victoire in 2026
- Born: January 21, 2002 (age 24) Kingston, Massachusetts, U.S.
- Height: 5 ft 8 in (173 cm)
- Position: Forward
- Shoots: Right
- PWHL team: Montreal Victoire
- Playing career: 2025–present

Skylar Irving (born January 21, 2002) is an American professional ice hockey forward for the Montreal Victoire of the Professional Women's Hockey League (PWHL). She played college ice hockey at Northeastern University from 2021 to 2025.

== Early life ==
Irving grew up in Kingston, Massachusetts, and attended Tabor Academy. Before college she also skated for the Bay State Breakers program.

== Playing career ==
=== College ===
Irving debuted for Northeastern in 2021–22 and recorded 15 points in 38 games, earning a spot on the Hockey East All-Rookie Team. As a junior in 2023–24 she led the Huskies with 35 points and was named Beanpot MVP. In 2024–25 she posted career highs with 17 goals and 33 points and was named to the Hockey East Second All-Star Team and the Hockey East All-Tournament Team.

=== Professional ===
On June 24, 2025, Irving was drafted in the third round, 20th overall, by the Montreal Victoire in the 2025 PWHL Draft. On November 20, 2025, she signed a one-year contract with the Victoire. The team announced she had re-signed on a one-year standard player agreement on October 6, 2026.

== International play ==
Irving was named to the United States Collegiate Women’s Select Team for the 2024 Collegiate Select Series against Canada.

== Personal life ==
She is the daughter of Sheila and Jay Irving and has one sibling, Spencer.

== Career statistics ==
=== Regular season and playoffs ===
			Regular season					Playoffs
Season	Team	League	GP	G	A	Pts	PIM	GP	G	A	Pts	PIM
2021–22	Northeastern Huskies	Hockey East	38	6	9	15	10	—	—	—	—	—
2022–23	Northeastern Huskies	Hockey East	38	6	10	16	12	—	—	—	—	—
2023–24	Northeastern Huskies	Hockey East	39	13	22	35	8	—	—	—	—	—
2024–25	Northeastern Huskies	Hockey East	37	17	16	33	16	—	—	—	—	—
2025–26	Montreal Victoire	PWHL	27	3	6	9	5	2	0	0	0	0
NCAA totals			152	42	57	99	46	—	—	—	—	—
PWHL totals			27	3	6	9	5	2	0	0	0	0

Source: HockeyDB; PWHL Draft recap confirms 2024–25 totals.

== Awards and honours ==
Honour	Year
College
Hockey East All-Rookie Team	2022
Beanpot Most Valuable Player	2024
Hockey East Third Team All-Star	2024
Hockey East Second Team All-Star	2025
Hockey East All-Tournament Team	2025
PWHL
Walter Cup champion	2026
