= Ava Rinker =

American ice hockey player (born 2002)

- Born: November 25, 2002 (age 23) Elverson, Pennsylvania, U.S.
- Height: 5 ft 4 in (163 cm)
- Position: Defense
- Shoots: Right
- PWHL team: Minnesota Frost
- Playing career: 2025–present

Ava Rinker (born November 25, 2002) is an American ice hockey defenceman currently as a reserve player for the Minnesota Frost of the Professional Women's Hockey League (PWHL). She played college ice hockey for the UConn Huskies. She was selected 30th overall by the Minnesota Frost in the 2025 PWHL Draft.

== Early life ==
Rinker is from Elverson, Pennsylvania. Her interest in hockey was piqued by watching a Hershey Bears game, after which she started playing street hockey with her brother. She soon was playing mites with boys.

Rinker played in the Philadelphia Jr. Flyers girls' hockey program before enrolling at UConn. She played for the Jr. Flyers for six years, served as a two-time captain, and was their first Division I recruit and first PWHL draftee.

== Playing career ==
=== College ===
Rinker appeared in all 144 games across four seasons at UConn. As a senior assistant captain in 2024–25, she posted career highs with 20 points (3 goals, 17 assists) in 36 games and was named to the Hockey East First All-Star Team. She also earned Hockey East Defender of the Month (February).

=== Professional ===
On June 24, 2025, Rinker was drafted in the fourth round, 30th overall, by the Minnesota Frost. Following pre-season training camp, she was announced as a reserve player for the Frost prior to the 2025–26 season.

== Personal life ==
Rinker's brother, AJ, uses a wheelchair and plays for the Flyers' PowerPlay team, a power wheelchair floor hockey team.

== Career statistics ==
			Regular season					Playoffs
Season	Team	League	GP	G	A	Pts	PIM	GP	G	A	Pts	PIM
2021–22	UConn	Hockey East	35	0	5	5	8	—	—	—	—	—
2022–23	UConn	Hockey East	35	2	5	7	12	—	—	—	—	—
2023–24	UConn	Hockey East	38	3	10	13	15	—	—	—	—	—
2024–25	UConn	Hockey East	36	3	17	20	18	—	—	—	—	—
NCAA totals			144	8	37	45	53	—	—	—	—	—

Source: College Hockey Inc.; Hockey East.

== Awards and honours ==
Honour	Year
College
Hockey East First All-Star Team	2025
