= Tamara Giaquinto =

Canadian ice hockey player (born 2002)

- Born: March 29, 2002 (age 24) Toronto, Ontario, Canada
- Height: 5 ft 6 in (168 cm)
- Position: Defense
- Shoots: Right
- PWHL team: Montréal Victoire
- Playing career: 2025–present

Tamara Giaquinto (born March 29, 2002) is a Canadian professional ice hockey defenseman as a reserve player for the Montréal Victoire of the Professional Women's Hockey League (PWHL). During the 2024–25 season, she captained the Boston University Terriers and was named the Hockey East Defender of the Year.

== Early life ==
Giaquinto grew up in Toronto and attended Appleby College, where she captained the team. She played club hockey for the Brampton Canadettes and won gold with Team Ontario Red at the 2019 National Women’s U18 Championship. She represented Hockey Canada at the 2019 U18 Summer Series and earned silver with Canada at the 2020 IIHF U18 Women’s World Championship.

== Playing career ==
=== College ===
Giaquinto played five seasons (2020–21 to 2024–25) for Boston University, appearing in 144 games with 44 points (15 goals, 29 assists). She was named team captain for 2024–25 by head coach Tara Watchorn.

As a graduate student in 2024–25, she recorded career highs with 9 goals and 18 points and was named the Hockey East Defender of the Year and a First Team All-Star. She became the first Terrier to win the award since 2012. She also earned Defender of the Month honors in September/October 2024 and Defender of the Week on March 10, 2025.

Giaquinto helped BU win the 2025 Hockey East tournament, scoring the opening goal in the championship game; she was named to the All-Tournament Team.

=== Professional ===
On June 24, 2025, Giaquinto was drafted in the sixth round, 44th overall, by the Montréal Victoire in the 2025 PWHL Draft. On November 20, 2025, she signed a reserve player contract with the Victoire.

== International play ==
Medal record

Representing Canada

Ice hockey

World U18 Championship
Silver medal – second place	2020 Slovakia	

As a member of Canada’s under-18 team, Giaquinto earned silver at the 2020 IIHF World Women's U18 Championship in Bratislava, Slovakia. Earlier, she won gold with Ontario Red at the 2019 National Women’s U18 Championship and skated in the 2019 U18 Summer Series.

== Career statistics ==
			Regular season					Playoffs
Season	Team	League	GP	G	A	Pts	PIM	GP	G	A	Pts	PIM
2020–21	Boston University	Hockey East	12	0	2	2	6	—	—	—	—	—
2021–22	Boston University	Hockey East	26	0	6	6	2	—	—	—	—	—
2022–23	Boston University	Hockey East	33	1	2	3	4	—	—	—	—	—
2023–24	Boston University	Hockey East	35	5	10	15	6	—	—	—	—	—
2024–25	Boston University	Hockey East	38	9	9	18	10	—	—	—	—	—
2025–26	Montréal Victoire	PWHL	12	0	0	0	0	—	—	—	—	—
PWHL totals			12	0	0	0	0	—	—	—	—	—

Sources: HockeyDB; Professional Women's Hockey League.

== Awards and honours ==
Honour	Year	Ref
College
Hockey East Defender of the Year	2024–25	
Hockey East First Team All-Star	2024–25	
Hockey East All-Tournament Team	2025	
New England Hockey Writers Association All-Star	2024–25	
