= Sydney Healey =

- Born: September 6, 2004 (age 22) Arthur, Ontario
- Height: 5 ft 7 in (170 cm)
- Position: Forward
- Shoots: Left
- PWHL team: San Jose Sea Lions
- Playing career: 2026–present

Sydney Healey (born September 6, 2004) is a professional ice hockey forward drafted by the Vegas Vanguards expansion franchise of the Professional Women's Hockey League. She played her college ice hockey with Boston University.

== Playing career ==
=== College ===
The 2024-25 season resulted in Healey leading the Terriers with 15 goals and 23 points. In the Hockey East tournament, she scored the championship clinching goal in overtime versus rival Northeastern.

During the 2025-26 season, Healey served as the Terriers alternate captain. She recorded career highs in goals (18) and points (29), leading the Terriers

=== Professional ===
On June 17, 2026, she was selected sixty fifth overall in the 2026 PWHL Draft.

== Awards and honors ==
- 2024-25 Hockey East Tournament Most Valuable Player
- 2024-25 Hockey East All-Tournament Team
- 2024-25 Hockey East Third Team All-Star
- 2024-25 New England Hockey Writers Association All-Star
