= UConn Huskies women's ice hockey =

- Current season
- University: University of Connecticut
- Conference: Hockey East
- Head coach: Chris MacKenzie
- Arena: Toscano Family Ice Forum; Storrs, Connecticut
- Colors: National flag blue and white
- Fight song: "UConn Husky"

NCAA tournament appearances
- 2024, 2026

Conference tournament champions
- Hockey East: 2024, 2026

Conference regular season champions
- Hockey East: 2024, 2025

The UConn Huskies women's ice hockey team is a National Collegiate Athletic Association (NCAA) Division I college ice hockey program that represents the University of Connecticut. The Huskies compete in the Hockey East conference. The Huskies play in the Toscano Family Ice Forum.

== History ==
The UConn Huskies women's ice hockey team began in 2000, under head coach Heather Linstad, in the Mark Edward Freitas Ice Forum. In its first season, the team played as an independent team. In the 2001–02 season, the team joined the ECAC Hockey women's conference. Since the 2002–03 season, they have participated in the Hockey East (HEA), also known as the Women's Hockey East Association (WHEA), conference.

Forward Jaclyn Hawkins, who played during 2004 to 2007, is ranked 10th in career goals in the WHEA. She scored 51 goals and 43 assists in 81 games. In 2006, she tied an NCAA record for 3 power play goals in a single game, setting the Hockey East record for that feat.

A 1–0 shutout by Connecticut on November 13, 2010, ended the New Hampshire Wildcats’ 17-game unbeaten streak against the Huskies. The Huskies penalty kill was a perfect 6-of-6 on the weekend. The shutout marked the first time the Wildcats were shut out at home since November 28, 2004 (by the Mercyhurst Lakers), a streak of 109 consecutive home games.

The Huskies played an outdoor game against the Providence Friars at Rentschler Field on February 13, 2011, as part of the Whalers Hockey Fest.

After thirteen seasons as head coach, Heather Linstad left in 2013. Chris MacKenzie became head coach in May 2013.

Netminder Elaine Chuli holds the Hockey East record for all-time career saves, which she set in 2015–16 season with the Huskies.

The 2017–18 season was the most dramatic in the history of women's ice hockey at UConn. The team was in last place at the end of January, but turned the season around. They upset the Boston College Eagles, ranked number 3, in the semi-finals of the Hockey East tournament, and went on to play in the league championship game. They lost in a close game to Northeastern Huskies, by a score of 2–1. Senior goalie, Annie Bélanger, was selected as the Hockey East Goalie of the Year, and named to the Hockey East All-Star First Team.

In the 2019–20 season, the Huskies finished 5th in the league. They defeated Boston College in the quarterfinals, winning the third and deciding game 2–1. They went on to defeat the New Hampshire Wildcats 4–0 in the semi-finals to advance to the final against the Northeastern Huskies. They were defeated in the championship game by a score of 9–1.

In 2023, the Huskies moved to the new Toscano Family Ice Forum, adjacent to the Ice Forum. The 2,600-seat facility also hosts the UConn men's hockey team.

During the 2023–24 season, the Huskies posted a program best 25–8–5 record, and won their first Hockey East regular season championship in program history. The Huskies also won the Hockey East tournament and advanced to the NCAA women's ice hockey tournament for the first time in program history.

== Season-by-season results ==
| Won championship | Lost championship | Conference champions | League leader |

| Year | Coach | W | L | T | Conference | Conf. W | Conf. L | Conf. T | Finish | Conference Tournament | NCAA Tournament |
| 2025–26 | Chris MacKenzie | 28 | 9 | 2 | Hockey East | 17 | 6 | 1 | 2nd HE | Won Quarterfinals vs. Maine (6–1); Won Semifinals vs. Holy Cross (6–1); Won Championship vs. Northeastern (2–1 OT) | Won First round vs. Princeton (4–1); Lost Quarterfinals vs. Penn State (0–3) |
| 2024–25 | Chris MacKenzie | 22 | 12 | 2 | Hockey East | 19 | 6 | 2 | 1st HE | Won Quarterfinals vs. Merrimack (4–0); Lost Semifinals vs. Northeastern (1–3) | Did not qualify |
| 2023–24 | Chris MacKenzie | 25 | 8 | 5 | Hockey East | 19 | 4 | 4 | 1st HE | Won Quarterfinals vs. Holy Cross (4–2); Won Semifinals vs. Boston College (2–1 OT); Won Championship vs. Northeastern (1–0 OT) | Lost First round vs. Minnesota Duluth (1–0 2OT) |
| 2022–23 | Chris MacKenzie | 18 | 13 | 4 | Hockey East | 12 | 11 | 4 | 5th HE | Lost Quarterfinals vs. Boston College (3-4 OT) | Did not qualify |
| 2021-22 | Chris MacKenzie | 24 | 9 | 4 | Hockey East | 16 | 7 | 4 | 3rd HE | Won Quarterfinals vs. Boston University (3-1); Won Semifinals vs. Vermont (3-1); Lost Championship vs. Northeastern (1-3) | Did not qualify |
| 2020-21 | Chris MacKenzie | 9 | 10 | 1 | Hockey East | 8 | 9 | 1 | 7th HE | Won Quarterfinal vs. Boston College (5-1); Lost Semifinals vs. Northeastern (1-2) | Did not qualify |
| 2019-20 | Chris MacKenzie | 19 | 18 | 2 | Hockey East | 13 | 12 | 2 | 5th HE | Won Quarterfinals vs. Boston College (2-4, 2-0, 2-1) Won Semifinals vs. UNH (4-0); Lost Championship vs. Northeastern (1-9) | Did not qualify |
| 2018-19 | Chris MacKenzie | 14 | 18 | 4 | Hockey East | 9 | 14 | 4 | 7th HE | Lost Quarterfinals vs. Boston College (1-4, 4-5 OT) | Did not qualify |
| 2017–18 | Chris MacKenzie | 16 | 14 | 9 | Hockey East | 7 | 11 | 6 | 8th HE | Won Quarterfinals vs. Providence (0-4, 3-0, 2-1); Won Semifinals vs. Boston College (4-2); Lost Championship vs. Northeastern (1-2) | Did not qualify |
| 2016–17 | Chris MacKenzie | 14 | 18 | 4 | Hockey East | 9 | 13 | 2 | 7th HE | Lost Quarterfinals vs. Northeastern (2-6, 2-3 OT) | Did not qualify |
| 2015–16 | Chris MacKenzie | 17 | 16 | 5 | Hockey East | 11 | 10 | 3 | 4th HE | Won Quarterfinals vs. New Hampshire (2-1 OT, 4-3 3OT); Lost Semifinals vs. Boston College (2-4) | Did not qualify |
| 2014–15 | Chris MacKenzie | 11 | 18 | 8 | Hockey East | 5 | 11 | 5 | 5th HE | Won Quarterfinals vs. Maine (3-2, 1-0 OT); Lost Semifinals vs. Boston College (1-3) | Did not qualify |
| 2013–14 | Chris MacKenzie | 9 | 24 | 2 | Hockey East | 6 | 14 | 1 | 5th HE | Lost Quarterfinals vs. Northeastern (1-2) | Did not qualify |
| 2012–13 | Heather Linstad | 3 | 29 | 3 | Hockey East | 1 | 19 | 1 | 8th HE | Lost Quarterfinals vs. Boston University (1-5) | Did not qualify |
| 2011–12 | Heather Linstad | 4 | 23 | 7 | Hockey East | 3 | 15 | 3 | 7th HE | Did not qualify | Did not qualify |
| 2010–11 | Heather Linstad | 13 | 19 | 3 | Hockey East | 9 | 9 | 3 | 4th HE | Lost Quarterfinals vs. Northeastern (0-4) | Did not qualify |
| 2009–10 | Heather Linstad | 21 | 9 | 7 | Hockey East | 10 | 5 | 6 | 5th HE | Won Quarterfinals vs. Northeastern (4-1); Won Semifinals vs. Providence (3-2); Lost Championship vs. Boston University (1-2 OT) | Did not qualify |
| 2008–09 | Heather Linstad | 19 | 12 | 4 | Hockey East | 10 | 8 | 3 | 4th HE | Lost Semifinals vs. Providence (0-3) | Did not qualify |
| 2007–08 | Heather Linstad | 22 | 8 | 5 | Hockey East | 13 | 5 | 3 | 2nd HE | Lost Semifinals vs. Providence (1-5) | Did not qualify |
| 2006–07 | Heather Linstad | 17 | 15 | 3 | Hockey East | 12 | 7 | 2 | 4th HE | Lost Semifinals vs. New Hampshire (0-2) | Did not qualify |
| 2005–06 | Heather Linstad | 12 | 21 | 1 | Hockey East | 10 | 11 | 0 | 5th HE | Did not qualify | Did not qualify |
| 2004–05 | Heather Linstad | 16 | 12 | 8 | Hockey East | 11 | 5 | 4 | 3rd HE | Won Semifinals vs. New Hampshire (5-4 OT); Lost Championship vs. Providence (1-3) | Did not qualify |
| 2003–04 | Heather Linstad | 9 | 19 | 6 | Hockey East | 5 | 11 | 4 | 5th HE | Did not qualify | Did not qualify |
| 2002–03 | Heather Linstad | 11 | 20 | 4 | Hockey East | 3 | 9 | 3 | 4th HE | Lost Semifinals vs. Providence (0-7) | Did not qualify |
| 2001–02 | Heather Linstad | 11 | 21 | 3 | ECAC Eastern | 7 | 12 | 2 | 6th ECAC E. | Lost Quarterfinals vs. New Hampshire (1-4) | Did not qualify |
| 2000–01 | Heather Linstad | 3 | 10 | 0 | Independent | | | | | | Did not qualify |

== Current roster ==
As of November 12, 2026.

| No. | Nat. | Player | Class | Pos | Height | DoB | Hometown | Previous team |
|---|---|---|---|---|---|---|---|---|
| 2 | (United States) | Camryn Grimley | Sophomore | D | 5' 4" (1.63 m) | 2007-01-31 | Eagleville, Pennsylvania | Philadelphia Jr. Flyers |
| 3 | (United States) | Martha Mobarak (A) | Senior | F | 5' 10" (1.78 m) | 2005-04-29 | Chicago, Illinois | Windy City Storm |
| 4 | (United States) | Teagan Vaughan | Senior | D | 5' 7" (1.7 m) | 2004-01-18 | Royal Oak, Michigan | Assumption University (Worcester) |
| 5 | (Canada) | Julia Stephen (A) | Senior | D | 5' 8" (1.73 m) | 2005-07-00 | Burlington, Ontario | Burlington Barracudas |
| 6 | (Canada) | Chelsea Tiller | Freshman | D | 5' 7" (1.7 m) | 2008-01-16 | St. Catharines, Ontario | Burlington Barracudas |
| 7 | (Canada) | Claire Murdoch (C) | Junior | F | 5' 6" (1.68 m) | 2006-10-09 | Toronto, Ontario | Burlington Barracudas |
| 8 | (United States) | Julia Pellerin | Senior | F | 5' 6" (1.68 m) | 2004-10-23 | Windham, New Hampshire | Boston College |
| 10 | (Canada) | Callie McLean | Sophomore | F | 5' 6" (1.68 m) | 2007-05-31 | Ottawa, Ontario | Ottawa Jr. Lady Senators |
| 11 | (Canada) | Caprie Chaulk | Freshman | F | 5' 7" (1.7 m) | 2008-03-21 | Scarborough, Ontario | Durham West Jr. Lightning |
| 14 | (Canada) | Ellie Markakis | Junior | F | 5' 8" (1.73 m) | 2005-01-28 | Oakville, Ontario | Burlington Barracudas |
| 15 | (Canada) | Leila Ricciuti | Sophomore | F | 5' 5" (1.65 m) | 2007-00-00 | Manotick, Ontario | Nepean Jr. Wildcats |
| 17 | (Canada) | Caileigh Tiller | Freshman | F | 5' 8" (1.73 m) | 2008-01-16 | St. Catharines, Ontario | Burlington Barracudas |
| 18 | (Canada) | Maya Serdachny | Senior | D | 5' 9" (1.75 m) | 2005-02-18 | Edmonton, Alberta | RINK Hockey Academy Kelowna |
| 19 | (United States) | Grace Riley | Freshman | D | 5' 8" (1.73 m) | 2007-08-14 | Winter Garden, Florida | Phillips Exeter Academy |
| 20 | (Canada) | Jade Lore | Junior | D | 5' 7" (1.7 m) | 2005-11-15 | Richmond, British Columbia | Central York Panthers |
| 22 | (Canada) | Peyton Anzivino | Sophomore | F | 5' 6" (1.68 m) | 2006-06-03 | Binbrook, Ontario | Stoney Creek Jr. Sabres |
| 26 | (Canada) | Laurie Aubin | Freshman | F | 5' 4" (1.63 m) | 2008-01-30 | Boisbriand, Quebec | Stanstead College |
| 35 | (United States) | Shannon Moran | Senior | G | 5' 9" (1.75 m) | 2004-03-27 | Grantham, New Hampshire | Mid Fairfield CT Stars |
| 45 | (Canada) | Amelia Wilkinson | Freshman | G | 5' 6" (1.68 m) | 2007-02-12 | Holland Landing, Ontario | Durham West Jr. Lightning |
| 54 | (Canada) | Livvy Dewar (C) | Senior | F | 5' 11" (1.8 m) | 2004-09-20 | Fredericton, New Brunswick | NAHA White |
| 70 | (Canada) | Taylor Belchetz | Sophomore | G | 5' 9" (1.75 m) | 2006-08-14 | Oakville, Ontario | Mississauga Jr. Hurricanes |
| 77 | (Canada) | Sadie Hotles | Junior | F | 5' 8" (1.73 m) | 2006-09-24 | Markham, Ontario | Durham West Jr. Lightning |
| 78 | (United States) | Addison Stewart | Freshman | F | 5' 7" (1.7 m) | 2007-04-30 | Wilmette, Illinois | Chicago Mission |
| 81 | (Canada) | True Thompson | Sophomore | D | 5' 8" (1.73 m) | 2006-10-11 | Sherwood Park, Alberta | East Coast Wizards |

== International ==
The following players have participated with national teams in international tournaments:

=== Canada ===
National development (under-22) team

- Cristin Allen, D: 2008 Air Canada Cup
- Dominique Thibault, F: 2008 Air Canada Cup

=== China ===
- Tia Chan (Chen Tiya), G: 2021 World Championship D1B, 2022 Winter Olympics
- Leah Lum (Lin Qiqi), F: 2021 World Championship D1B, 2022 Winter Olympics
- Camryn Wong (Huang Huier), D: 2021 World Championship D1B, 2022 Winter Olympics

== Awards and honors ==
- Annie Bélanger, 2018–19 Hockey East Goaltender of the Year
- Cristin Allen, 2010 Hockey East Best Defenseman Award
- Cristin Allen, Runner-up, 2010 Hockey East Player of the Year
- Cristin Allen, New England Hockey Writers 2010 All-Star Team
- Jennifer Chaisson, 2010 Hockey East Best Defensive Forward
- Alexandra Garcia, Bauer Goaltender of the Month, January 2010
- Alexandra Garcia, Runner Up, Hockey East 2010 Goaltending Champion
- Jaclyn Hawkins, 2004–05 Hockey East ITECH Rookie of the Year
- Chris MacKenzie, 2023–24 Hockey East Coach of the Year
- Chris MacKenzie, 2023–24 AHCA Coach of the Year
- Tia Chan, 2026 Women's HCA National Goalie of the Year

=== AHCA All-American Team ===
- 2025-26 Division I All-American First Team: Tia Chan, G

=== All-Hockey East Team ===
- 2010 WHEA First-Team All-Star: Cristin Allen, D
- 2010 WHEA Honorable Mention All-Star:
  - Alexandra Garcia, G
  - Jody Sydor, D
  - Monique Weber, F
- 2015–16 WHEA First Team All-Star: Elaine Chuli, G
- 2017–18 WHEA First Team All-Star: Annie Bélanger, G
- 2019–20 WHEA Second Team All-Star: Natalie Snodgrass, F

=== Hockey East All-Rookie Team ===
- 2020–21 Hockey East Pro Ambitions All-Rookie Team:
  - Tia Chan, G
  - Jada Habisch, F

=== Hockey East All-Tournament team ===
- 2005 Hockey East All-Tournament team
  - Tiffany Owens, F
  - Natalie Vibert, D
- 2010 Women's Hockey East All-Tournament Team:
  - Cristin Allen, D
  - Michelle Binning, F
  - Amy Hollstein, F

=== USCHO honors ===
- 2004–05 All USCHO.com Rookie Team: Jaclyn Hawkins, F

== Huskies in elite hockey ==
A number of Huskies alumnae have pursued post-collegiate ice hockey careers in elite leagues around the world. In North America, Huskies have played in leagues and organizations including the National Women's Hockey League (NWHL; 1999–2007), the Canadian Women's Hockey League (CWHL; 2007–2019), the Premier Hockey Federation (PHF since 2021; founded in 2015 as NWHL – not related to defunct league of same name), and the Professional Women's Hockey Players Association (PWHPA; founded in 2019). Additionally, many alumnae have played in international leagues including the Australian Women's Ice Hockey League (AWIHL), the German Women's Hockey Liga (DFEL), the European Women's Hockey League (EWHL), the Italian Hockey League Women (IHLW), the Swedish Women's Hockey League (SDHL), and the Zhenskaya Hockey League (ZhHL).

The following list is not exhaustive, please assist by contributing missing content.

| = CWHL All-Star | = PHF All-Star | = Clarkson Cup Champion | = Isobel Cup Champion | = Walter Cup Champion |

| Player | Pos. | Team(s) | League(s) | Year(s) | Championship(s) |
|---|---|---|---|---|---|
| Annie Bélanger | G | Calgary Inferno | CWHL | 2018-19 | Clarkson Cup (2019) |
| Annie Bélanger | G | | PWHPA | 2019-21 | |
| Kayla Campero | F | ESC Planegg | DFEL | 2015-16 | |
| Michela Cava | F | Toronto Furies | CWHL | 2016-17 | |
| Michela Cava | F | MODO Hockey; Brynäs IF; Luleå HF/MSSK | SDHL | 2017-19; 2019-20; 2020-21 | |
| Michela Cava | F | Toronto Six | PHF | 2021-23 | Isobel Cup (2023) |
| Michela Cava | F | Minnesota Frost | PWHL | 2023-25 | Walter Cup (2024) |
| Tia Chan | G | KRS Vanke Rays | ZhHL | 2021-22 | |
| Elaine Chuli | G | Vanke Rays; Toronto Furies | CWHL | 2017-18; 2018-19 | |
| Elaine Chuli | G | Dream Gap Tour | PWHPA | 2019-20 | |
| Elaine Chuli | G | Toronto Six | PHF | 2020-23 | Isobel Cup (2023) |
| Elaine Chuli | G | Montreal Victoire | PWHL | 2023-25 | |
| Elaine Chuli | G | Toronto Sceptres | PWHL | 2025-26 | |
| Catherine Crawley | F | Connecticut Whale; Metropolitan Riveters | PHF | 2021-22; 2022-23 | |
| Summer-Rae Dobson | F | Buffalo Beauts | PHF | 2022-23 | |
| Jamie Fox | D | EV Bozen Eagles | EWHL; IHLW | 2019-20 | |
| Chloe Gonsalves | D | HV71 | SDHL | 2022-23 | |
| Jada Habisch | F | Seattle Torrent | PWHL | 2025-26 | |
| Jaclyn Hawkins | F | Boston Blades | CWHL | 2010-13 | |
| Theresa Knutson | F | Mad Dogs Mannheim; Eisbären Juniors Berlin | DFEL | 2018-20; 2020-21 | |
| Theresa Knutson | F | Metropolitan Riveters | PHF | 2020-22 | |
| Theresa Knutson | F | ECDC Memmingen | DFEL | 2022-23 | |
| Leah Lum | F | KRS Vanke Rays | CWHL; ZhHL | 2018-22 | |
| Leah Lum | F | Toronto Six | PHF | 2022-23 | Isobel Cup (2023) |
| Leah Lum | F | Montreal Victoire | PWHL | 2023-24 | |
| Sarah MacDonnell | F | ESC Planegg | DFEL | 2015-16 | |
| Ava Rinker | D | Minnesota Frost | PWHL | 2025-26 | |
| Emily Reid | D | EHV Sabres | EWHL | 2021-22 | |
| Emily Snodgrass | F | EV Bozen Eagles | EWHL; IHLW | 2015-16 | |
| Natalie Snodgrass | F | Minnesota Whitecaps | PHF | 2022-23 | |
| Natalie Snodgrass | F | Ottawa Charge | PWHL | 2023-25 | |
| Natalie Snodgrass | F | Seattle Torrent | PWHL | 2025-26 | |
| Dominique Thibault | F | Montreal Axion | NWHL | 2005-06 | |
| Dominique Thibault | F | Canadiennes de Montreal | CWHL | 2010-14 | Clarkson Cup (2011, 2012) |
| Nicole Tritter | F | Melbourne Ice | AWIHL | 2014-15 | |
| Morgan Wabick | F | MoDo Hockey | SDHL | 2022-23 | |
| Taylor Wabick | D | MoDo Hockey | SDHL | 2022-23 | |
| Camryn Wong | D | KRS Vanke Rays | ZhHL | 2021-22 | |
| Camryn Wong | D | Luleå HF/MSSK | SDHL | 2024-25 | |
| Margaret Zimmer | F | Boston Blades | CWHL | 2016-17 | |

== See also ==
- NCAA Division I Women's Hockey conferences and teams
- List of college women's ice hockey coaches with 250 wins (Heather Linstad ranks fifth on all-time list)
- UConn Huskies
- UConn Huskies men's ice hockey
