= Brian Durocher =

American ice hockey coach (born 1956)

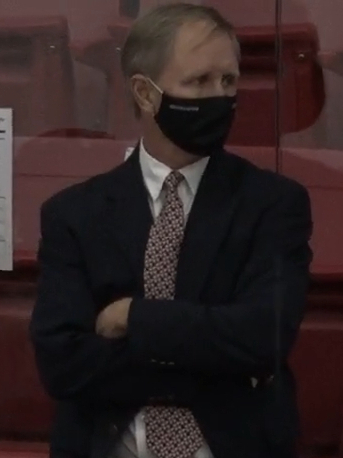
- Durocher in 2021

Current position
- Title: Special assistant to the director of athletics
- Team: Boston University

Biographical details
- Born: October 18, 1956 (age 70); Longmeadow, Massachusetts, U.S.

Playing career
- 1974–1978: Boston University
- Position: Goaltender

Coaching career (HC unless noted)
- 1978–1980: American International (asst.)
- 1980–1985: Boston University (asst.)
- 1986–1991: Colgate (asst.)
- 1991–1992: Colgate
- 1992–1996: Brown (asst.)
- 1996–2004: Boston University (asst.)
- 2004–2023: Boston University
- 2011: USA Women's U-18 (asst.)

Head coaching record
- Overall: 350–225–76 (.596)
- Tournaments: 5–6 (.455)

Accomplishments and honors

Championships
- 2× Hockey East champion (2011, 2013); 5× Hockey East tournament champion (2010, 2012, 2013, 2014, 2015)

Awards
- 2008 Hockey East Coach of the Year; 2019 Bruce Lehane Coaching Award

Brian Durocher (born October 18, 1956) is an American retired ice hockey player and coach who is currently working as a special assistant at Boston University. He won a national championship with Boston University as a player before embarking on a long coaching career.

== Career ==
Durocher began his college career with Boston University in 1974. Though initially the primary goaltender, he split the starting duties with Pat Devlin in his first two seasons, helping BU win consecutive ECAC tournament championships. Durocher transitioned into the secondary role beginning in his junior year when Jim Craig joined the program. Though he was played less frequently than before, Durocher still made several appearances in goal, helping BU win another conference title in 1977. In his senior season, Durocher, now co-captain, helped the Terriers produce one of the best seasons in program history, finishing the regular season as a top team in the nation with a 25–1 record. After Craig won the quarterfinal match in the conference tournament, Durocher was in goal for a stunning upset in the semifinal round. Though the Terriers won the consolation game, their season would have typically ended there as the two ECAC semifinalists were given bids into the NCAA tournament. Fortunately, the NCAA had altered the tournament format two years earlier and gave itself the ability to add additional team to the field as they saw fit. BU was given a reprieve and awarded a bid into the quarterfinal round where they were able to exact their revenge over Providence and went on to win the national title.

Immediately after graduating, Durocher turned to coaching as was hired as an assistant at American International. He spent two years with the Yellow Jackets before returning to his alma mater in the same capacity. Unfortunately, the early-80's were a bit of a dead period for the Terriers and the team had less success than when Durocher was wearing the pads. He was, however, able to train up Cleon Daskalakis into becoming a First Team All-American. BU had recovered by the mid 80's and Durocher moved on, joining the staff at Colgate under Terry Slater. He was charged with recruiting players for the team and did such a quality job that, in 1990, the Red Raiders won their first conference championship. That team made just the second NCAA tournament appearance in program history and marched all the way to the championship game. Though Colgate failed to win the title, the program was still riding high on its new-found success. About a year and a half afterwards, tragedy struck when Slater suffered a massive stroke. The coach died 4 days later and Durocher was forced to take over as interim head coach for the remainder of the season. Durocher was offered the head coaching job after the year but he declined.

Durocher returned to being an assistant coach the following season, joining the staff at Brown. His arrival coincided with the team producing its first winning campaign in 16 years and reaching the conference championship game. Brown made its first appearance in the NCAA tournament since 1976 and remained a top team in ECAC Hockey for the next three years. After that 4-year stint, Durocher joined Boston University for the third time and stuck around for good. He spent eight years as an assistant on the men's team, helping the club to three league titles and five NCAA tournament appearances.

In 2004, Boston University announced that they were promoting their women's ice hockey team to varsity status and Durocher agreed to lead the team. The Terriers hit the ice for their first game in 2005 and posted the program's first winning season just one year later. Durocher swiftly built the team into a title contender, getting the Terriers their first conference title in 2010 and then reaching the national championship game the following year. The team didn't decline after losing to perennial power Wisconsin and reeled off four consecutive Hockey East championships, during that run, BU made its second national championship game appearance but were unable to win once more.

After losing their bid for a 5th straight conference championship in 2016, the Terriers began to decline from their lofty position and the team was unable to get back into the NCAA tournament. BU had a couple of good seasons at the end of the decade but they flamed out in the conference tournament and ended with disappointing finishes. Durocher stayed on through the COVID-19 season and its fallout, steading the team through several rough seasons. Durocher stepped down from his post in 2023, retiring as a coach after 18 seasons with the women's team and more than 330 wins behind the bench. He turned over control of the team to one of his former players, Tara Watchorn, but remained with the college as a special assistant for the athletic department.

== Personal life ==
Brian and his wife Laura have three daughters, Kirsten, Kara and Kelsey.

== Career statistics ==
=== Regular season and playoffs ===
			Regular season									Playoffs
Season	Team	League	GP	W	L	T	MIN	GA	SO	GAA	SV%	GP	W	L	MIN	GA	SO	GAA	SV%
1974–75	Boston University	ECAC Hockey	22	—	—	—	—	—	—	—	—	—	—	—	—	—	—	—	—
1975–76	Boston University	ECAC Hockey	17	—	—	—	—	—	—	—	—	—	—	—	—	—	—	—	—
1976–77	Boston University	ECAC Hockey	10	—	—	—	—	—	—	—	—	—	—	—	—	—	—	—	—
1977–78	Boston University	ECAC Hockey	16	14	2	0	—	—	0	—	—	—	—	—	—	—	—	—	—

== Head coaching record ==
Record table
Season	Team	Overall	Conference	Standing	Postseason
Colgate Red Raiders (ECAC Hockey) (1991–1992)
1991–92	Colgate	12–10–0 ^{†}	10–9–0 ^{†}	8th	ECAC Preliminary Round
Colgate:		12–10–0	10–9–0		
Boston University Terriers (Hockey East) (2005–2023)
2005–06	Boston University	12–17–4	6–13–2	6th	
2006–07	Boston University	19–12–3	10–9–2	5th	
2007–08	Boston University	15–17–3	11–9–1	3rd	Hockey East Semifinals
2008–09	Boston University	18–11–7	10–6–5	3rd	Hockey East Semifinals
2009–10	Boston University	17–9–12	10–6–5	3rd	NCAA First Round
2010–11	Boston University	27–7–4	15–3–3	1st	NCAA Runner–Up
2011–12	Boston University	23–14–1	14–7–0	3rd	NCAA Frozen Four
2012–13	Boston University	28–6–3	18–2–1	1st	NCAA Runner–Up
2013–14	Boston University	24–13–1	14–7–0	2nd	NCAA First Round
2014–15	Boston University	25–9–3	15–5–1	2nd	NCAA First Round
2015–16	Boston University	23–14–2	17–5–2	3rd	Hockey East Runner-Up
2016–17	Boston University	19–12–6	12–8–4	3rd	Hockey East Semifinals
2017–18	Boston University	14–17–6	8–11–5	6th	Hockey East Quarterfinals
2018–19	Boston University	21–8–8	15–6–6	3rd	Hockey East Semifinals
2019–20	Boston University	24–8–4	18–6–3	2nd	Hockey East Quarterfinals
2020–21	Boston University	6–6–0	6–5–0	6th	Hockey East Quarterfinals
2021–22	Boston University	12–15–6	11–9–5	6th	Hockey East Quarterfinals
2022–23	Boston University	11–20–3	9–15–3	7th	Hockey East First Round
Boston University:		338–215–76	219–132–48		
Total:		350–225–76			
National champion Postseason invitational champion Conference regular season champion Conference regular season and conference tournament champion Division regular season champion Division regular season and conference tournament champion Conference tournament champion

† Mid-season replacement

== See also ==
- List of college women's ice hockey career coaching wins leaders
