= 2023 Hockey East women's ice hockey tournament =

International sporting competition

2023 Hockey East Women's ice hockey tournament
- Dates: February 22– March 4, 2023
- Teams: 10
- Finals site: Matthews Arena; Boston, Massachusetts
- Champions: Northeastern (6th title)
- Winning coach: Dave Flint (6th title)
- MVP: Alina Mueller (Northeastern)
- Hockey East Women's Ice Hockey Tournaments

The 2023 Hockey East Women's Ice Hockey Tournament was the 21st edition of the Women's Hockey East Tournament. It was played between February 22 and March 4, 2023. The championship was hosted by the highest remaining seed, Northeastern. Northeastern defeated Providence 4–1 to earn their 6th straight tournament championship. They earned the conference's automatic bid into the 2023 NCAA National Collegiate women's ice hockey tournament.

== Format ==
The tournament included all ten teams in the conference. Teams were ranked according to their finish in the conference standings. Seeds 1–6 earned a bye into the quarterfinal round, while seeds 7–10 played to determine the remaining quarterfinalists. Winners in the opening round were reseeded and advanced to play top two seeds in reverse order. Winners of the quarterfinal matches were again reseeded for the semifinal, and the winners of those two games faced off in the championship.

All series were single-elimination with opening round and quarterfinal matches occurring at home team sites. The semifinals were hosted at the two highest remaining team sites. The championship was hosted at the highest remaining seeds site. The tournament champion receives an automatic bid into the 2023 NCAA National Collegiate women's ice hockey tournament.

== Standings ==
2022–23 WHEA standings
	Conference							Overall					
	GP	W	L	T	PTS	GF	GA	GP	W	L	T	GF	GA
#4 Northeastern †*	27	24	2	1	72	100	23	38	34	3	1	144	35
#11 Vermont	27	16	8	3	56	81	49	36	22	11	3	105	65
#13 Providence	27	15	8	4	49	74	51	37	22	11	4	104	72
#15 Boston College	27	16	11	0	47	67	49	36	20	15	1	88	69
UConn	27	12	11	4	44	50	52	35	18	13	4	75	64
Maine	27	12	13	2	37	56	74	35	15	18	2	76	104
Boston University	27	9	15	3	33	56	73	34	11	20	3	73	94
New Hampshire	27	9	15	3	32	65	80	36	12	21	3	84	106
Holy Cross	27	6	21	0	18	34	81	34	7	26	1	47	103
Merrimack	27	5	20	2	17	44	95	36	9	25	2	66	126
Championship: March 4, 2023 † indicates conference regular season champion; * indicates conference tournament champion Rankings: USCHO.com; updated March 19, 2023

== Bracket ==
Teams are reseeded after the Opening Round and Quarterfinals

Opening Round; February 22
10	Merrimack	5*
7	Boston University	4
9	Holy Cross	3
8	New Hampshire	6

Quarterfinals; February 25
8	Merrimack	1
1	Northeastern	5
5	Connecticut	3
4	Boston College	4*
7	New Hampshire	1
2	Vermont	2*
6	Maine	2
3	Providence	5

Semifinals; March 1
4	Boston College	0
1	Northeastern	3
3	Providence	1
2	Vermont	0

Championship; March 4
3	Providence	1
1	Northeastern	4

Note: * denotes overtime period(s)

== Results ==
=== Opening Round ===
==== (10) Merrimack at (7) Boston University ====
February 22, 2023; 7:00 PM	Merrimack	5–4 (OT) (1–1, 3–3, 0–0, 1–0)	Boston University	Walter Brown Arena, Boston, Massachusetts; Attendance: 225

Game reference

Emma Gorski
Goalies
Andrea Brändli
Referees:
Amanda Tassoni
Thomas Quinn
Linesmen:
Crystalle Parent
Abigail Torres

6:07 – Natalie Nemes (1)	1–0
	1–1	13:51 – Julia Nearis (12) (O'Leary) 13:51
	1–2	27:05 – Brooke Disher (7)
27:36 – Alex Ferguson (1) (Kaufman, Nemes)	2–2
	2–3	28:51 Clara Yuhn (8) (Healey, DeVito)
30:03 – Natalie Nemes (2)	3–3
38:50 – SH – Sam Lessick (2) (Szott)	4–3
	4–4	39:34 – PP – Julia Shaunessy (33) (Calderone, Martin)
68:58 – GW – Alexa Pongo (12) (Inglis, Oosterveld)	5–4

2 min
Penalties
0 min
25
Shots
40

==== (9) Holy Cross at (8) New Hampshire ====
February 22, 2023; 7:00 PM	Holy Cross	6–3 (1–1, 2–2, 0–3)	New Hampshire	Whittemore Center, Durham, New Hampshire; Attendance: 156

Game reference

Madison Beck
Goalies
Ava Boutilier
Referees:
Chelsea Rapin
Kelly Cooke
Linesmen:
Kaitlin Hayes
Laura Schmidlein

	0–1	4:01 – Shea Verrier (5) (Jones)
16:29 – Sofia Smithson (4) (Lewis, Edmonds)	1–1
	1–2	29:00 – Kira Juodikis (17) (Pinto, Legros)
30:14 – Sofia Smithson (5) (Edmonds, Lewis)	2–2
31:31 – PP – Millie Sirum (5) (Langefels)	3–2
	3–3	39:45 – Emily Pinto (8) (Juodikis, Alvarez)
	3–4	48:29 – PP, GW – Emily Pinto (9) (Alvarez, Bent)
	3–5	53:07 – Marina Alvarez (4) (Jones, Berry)
	3–6	58:43 – EN – Nicole Kelly (4) (Rickwood)

6 min
Penalties
8 min
15
Shots
27

=== Quarterfinals ===
==== (7) New Hampshire at (2) Vermont ====
February 25, 2023; 1:00 PM	New Hampshire	1–2 (OT) (0–0, 1–1, 0–0, 0–1)	Vermont	Gutterson Fieldhouse, Burlington, Vermont; Attendance: 1,074

Game reference

Ava Boutilier
Goalies
Jessie McPherson
Referees:
James Troup
Steven Saul
Linesmen:
Michael Tarquinio
Laura Schmidlein

24:47 – Rae Breton (3) (Kelly, Martin)	1–0
	1–1	28:06– PP – Natálie Mlýnková (23) (Karjalainen, Schafzahl)
	1–2	69:48– GW – Theresa Schafzahl (21) (McCool, Skelton)

6 min
Penalties
2 min
30
Shots
32

==== (8) Merrimack at (1) Northeastern ====
February 25, 2023; 2:00 PM	Merrimack	1–5 (0–2, 0–0, 1–3)	Northeastern	Matthews Arena, Boston, Massachusetts; Attendance: 516

Game reference

Emma Gorski
Goalies
Gwyneth Philips
Referees:
Amanda Tassoni
Andrew DiFusco
Linesmen:
Michael Tarquinio
Danika Korpacz

	0–1	2:31 – Alina Mueller (22) (Murphy, Aurard)
	0–2	7:52 – GW – Mueller (23) (Poulin-Labelle, Aurard)
	0–3	44:40 – Chloé Aurard (18) (Mueller, Constantinople)
	0–4	52:49 – PP – Skylar Irving (6) (Mueller, Knoll)
	0–5	54:26 – PP – Alina Mueller (24) (Knoll, Murphy)
Teghan Inglis (5) (Oelkers, McKinley) – PP – 57:52	1–5

23 min
Penalties
2 min
18
Shots
61

==== (5) Connecticut at (4) Boston College ====
February 25, 2023; 2:00 PM	Connecticut	3–4 (OT) (0–1, 2–1, 1–1, 0–1)	Boston College	Conte Forum, Chestnut Hill, Massachusetts; Attendance: 506

Game reference

Tia Chan
Goalies
Abigail Levy
Referees:
Patrick Silva
Mackenzie Welter
Linesmen:
John Mulroy
Mackenzie Welter

	0–1	18:23 – Caroline Goffredo (Guay, Barnes)
Brooke Campbell (Walker) – 30:34	1–1
	1–2	31:50 – Abby Newhook (Barnes, Guay)
Jada Habisch (Ware) – 37:20	2–2
Brooke Campbell (Habisch) – 54:52	3–2
	3–3	56:11 – Katie Pyne (Bilka, Guay)
	3–4	62:39 – GW – Katie Pyne (Newhook, Bilka)

0 min
Penalties
0 min
36
Shots
32

==== (6) Maine at (3) Providence ====
February 25, 2023; 2:30 PM	Maine	2–5 (1–1, 1–2, 0–2)	Providence	Schneider Arena, Providence, Rhode Island; Attendance: 201

Game reference

Anna Larose
Goalies
Hope Walinski
Referees:
Evan Cooke
Russell Tedford
Linesmen:
Bob Hawkes
Rick Santilli

	0–1	12:11 – Caroline Peterson (6) (Kirchmair, Becker)
Grace Heiting (11) (Kuoppala) – 16:59	1–1
Ida Kuoppala (7) – SH – 20:33	2–1
	2–2	35:18 – Ashley Clark (2) (Hendrikson)
	2–3	37:32 – GW – Delaney Couture (4) (Coene, Becker)
	2–4	41:11 – Sara Hjalmarsson (24) (Neubauerova, Becker)
	2–5	58:28 – Caroline Peterson (7) (Becker)

2 min
Penalties
6 min
32
Shots
40

=== Semifinals ===
==== (4) Boston College at (1) Northeastern ====
March 1, 2023; 6:00 PM	Boston College	0–3 (0–1, 0–1, 0–1)	Northeastern	Matthews Arena, Boston, Massachusetts; Attendance: 672

Game reference

Abigail Levy
Goalies
Gwyneth Philips
Referees:
Kelly Cooke
Amanda Tassoni
Linesmen:
Laura Schmidlein
Abigail Torres

0–1	0:47 – GW – Peyton Anderson (10) (Carter, Thompson)
0–2	33:49 – Peyton Anderson (12) (Thompson, Marohn)
0–3	59:41 – en – Alina Mueller (18) (Yovetich)

4 min
Penalties
2 min
15
Shots
41

==== (3) Providence at (2) Vermont ====
March 1, 2023; 7:30 PM	Providence	1–0 (0–0, 0–1, 0–0)	Vermont	Gutterson Fieldhouse, Burlington, Vermont; Attendance: 1,251

Game reference
Hope Walinski	Goalies	Jessie McPherson	Referees: Chelsea Rapin; Steven Saul; Linesmen: Crystalle Parent; Kaitlyn Hayes
Delaney Couture (5) (Press) – 37:00 / 1–0			Referees: Chelsea Rapin; Steven Saul; Linesmen: Crystalle Parent; Kaitlyn Hayes
4 min	Penalties	2 min	Referees: Chelsea Rapin; Steven Saul; Linesmen: Crystalle Parent; Kaitlyn Hayes
19	Shots	30	Referees: Chelsea Rapin; Steven Saul; Linesmen: Crystalle Parent; Kaitlyn Hayes

=== Championship ===
==== (3) Providence at (1) Northeastern ====
March 4, 2023; 12:00 PM	Providence	1–4 (1–1, 0–1, 0–2)	Northeastern	Matthews Arena, Boston, Massachusetts; Attendance: 918

Game reference

Hope Walinski
Goalies
Gwyneth Philips
Referees:
Kelly Cooke
Chelsea Rapin
Linesmen:
Laura Schmidlein
Kaitlin Hayes

Noemi Neubauerova (DeBlois, Hjalmarsson) – 6:51	1–0
	1–1	14:32 – Alina Mueller
	1–2	26:55 – Megan Carter (Murphy, Mueller)
	1–3	40:55 – pp – Chloé Aurard (Murphy, Knoll)
	1–4	57:22 – pp –Taze Thompson (Poulin-Labelle, Knoll)

8 min
Penalties
2 min
21
Shots
36

== Tournament Awards ==
=== All Tournament Team ===
- Goalie: Gwyneth Philips, Northeastern
- Defense: Brooke Becker, Providence
- Defense: Megan Carter, Northeastern
- Forward: Peyton Anderson, Northeastern
- Forward: Alina Müller, Northeastern
- Forward: Maureen Murphy, Northeastern

=== Tournament MVP ===
- Alina Müller, Northeastern
