= 2022 Hockey East women's ice hockey tournament =

2022 Hockey East Women's ice hockey tournament
- Dates: February 23– March 8, 2022
- Teams: 10
- Finals site: Matthews Arena; Boston, Massachusetts
- Champions: Northeastern (5th title)
- Winning coach: Dave Flint (5th title)
- MVP: Alina Mueller (Northeastern)
- Hockey East Women's Ice Hockey Tournaments

The 2022 Women's Hockey East Association tournament was played between February 23 and March 8. The opening round, quarterfinals and semifinals were played on campus locations. The championship was hosted by the highest remaining seed, Northeastern. Northeastern defeated Connecticut 3-1 to earn their 5th straight tournament championship. They also earned the conference's automatic bid into the 2022 NCAA National Collegiate Women's Ice Hockey Tournament.

== Standings ==
2021–22 WHEA standings
| | Conference | | | | | | | Overall | | | | | |
| | GP | W | L | T | PTS | GF | GA | GP | W | L | T | GF | GA |
|---|---|---|---|---|---|---|---|---|---|---|---|---|---|
| #3 Northeastern †* | 26 | 21 | 3 | 2 | 67 | 96 | 27 | 38 | 31 | 5 | 2 | 136 | 40 |
| Vermont | 27 | 18 | 7 | 2 | 57 | 86 | 56 | 36 | 22 | 11 | 3 | 107 | 76 |
| UConn | 27 | 16 | 7 | 4 | 50 | 66 | 49 | 37 | 24 | 9 | 4 | 99 | 64 |
| Boston College | 26 | 16 | 9 | 1 | 47 | 71 | 63 | 34 | 19 | 14 | 1 | 88 | 84 |
| Maine | 26 | 12 | 13 | 1 | 41 | 57 | 59 | 35 | 15 | 19 | 1 | 75 | 87 |
| Boston University | 25 | 11 | 9 | 5 | 39 | 57 | 58 | 33 | 12 | 15 | 6 | 70 | 82 |
| Providence | 27 | 12 | 12 | 3 | 39 | 52 | 53 | 36 | 16 | 14 | 6 | 67 | 67 |
| New Hampshire | 26 | 9 | 16 | 1 | 30 | 51 | 74 | 34 | 11 | 21 | 2 | 71 | 95 |
| Merrimack | 27 | 6 | 20 | 1 | 20 | 53 | 86 | 34 | 8 | 25 | 1 | 61 | 116 |
| Holy Cross | 27 | 1 | 26 | 0 | 6 | 36 | 100 | 33 | 3 | 30 | 0 | 46 | 120 |
Championship: March 8, 2022 † indicates conference regular season champion; * indicates conference tournament champion Rankings: USCHO.com; updated March 20, 2022

== Bracket ==
Opening Round; February 23
10 | Holy Cross | 1
7 | Providence | 3
9 | Merrimack | 4
8 | New Hampshire | 1

Quarterfinals; February 25 & 26
6 | Boston University | 1
3 | Connecticut | 3
7 | Providence | 1
2 | Vermont | 4
5 | Maine | 2
4 | Boston College | 1
9 | Merrimack | 0
1 | Northeastern | 8

Semifinals; March 2
3 | Connecticut | 3
2 | Vermont | 1
5 | Maine | 1
1 | Northeastern | 3

Championship; March 8
3 | Connecticut | 1
1 | Northeastern | 3

Note: * denotes overtime period(s)
