= 2022–23 Northeastern Huskies women's ice hockey season =

Smashville Showcase champions Women's Beanpot champions WHEA regular season champions WHEA Tournament champions
- Conference: WHEA
- Home ice: Matthews Arena

Rankings
- USA Today: #5
- USCHO.com: #5

Record
- Overall: 34–3–1
- Conference: 24–2–1
- Home: 18–0–1
- Road: 12–2–0
- Neutral: 3–0–0

Coaches and captains
- Head coach: Dave Flint
- Assistant coaches: Nick Carpenito; Lindsay Berman; Todd Lampert
- Captain: Alina Müller
- Alternate captain(s): Mia Brown; Megan Carter; Maureen Murphy

The 2022–23 Northeastern Huskies women's ice hockey season will represent Northeastern University during the 2022–23 NCAA Division I women's ice hockey season.

== Offseason ==
=== Recruiting ===
Player	Position	Nationality	Notes
Holly Abela	Forward	Canada	Played for the Canada U-18 team
Kristina Allard	Defense	United States	Played for St. Paul's School
Avery Anderson	Forward	United States	Played for Belle Tire
Alyssa Antonakis	Forward	United States	Played for Belle Tire
Lily Brazis	Forward	United States	Played for Cushing Academy
Jules Constantinople	Defense	United States	Played for the Connecticut Polar Bears
Mia Langlois	Forward	United States	Played for Cushing Academy
Maude Poulin-Labelle	Defense	Canada	Grad transfer from Vermont
Lily Shannon	Forward	United States	Played for the Boston Junior Eagles
Taze Thompson	Forward	Canada	Transfer from Harvard

=== Departures ===
Player	Position	Nationality	Notes
Katie Cipra	Forward	United States	Graduated
Ani FitzGerald	Forward	United States	Left program
Aerin Frankel	Goalie	United States	Graduated
Skylar Fontaine	Defense	United States	Graduated
Gillian Foote	Defense	Canada	Graduated
Brooke Hobson	Defense	Canada	Graduated
Emma Jurusik	Forward	United States	Graduated
Lauren MacInnis	Defense	United States	Graduated
Maddie Mills	Forward	United States	Graduated
Andrea Renner	Forward	United States	Graduated
Miceala Sindoris	Forward	United States	Graduated
Brooke Tucker	Forward	United States	Graduated
Tessa Ward	Forward	United States	Graduated

== Regular season ==
=== Standings ===
2022–23 WHEA standings
	Conference							Overall					
	GP	W	L	T	PTS	GF	GA	GP	W	L	T	GF	GA
#4 Northeastern †*	27	24	2	1	72	100	23	38	34	3	1	144	35
#11 Vermont	27	16	8	3	56	81	49	36	22	11	3	105	65
#13 Providence	27	15	8	4	49	74	51	37	22	11	4	104	72
#15 Boston College	27	16	11	0	47	67	49	36	20	15	1	88	69
UConn	27	12	11	4	44	50	52	35	18	13	4	75	64
Maine	27	12	13	2	37	56	74	35	15	18	2	76	104
Boston University	27	9	15	3	33	56	73	34	11	20	3	73	94
New Hampshire	27	9	15	3	32	65	80	36	12	21	3	84	106
Holy Cross	27	6	21	0	18	34	81	34	7	26	1	47	103
Merrimack	27	5	20	2	17	44	95	36	9	25	2	66	126
Championship: March 4, 2023 † indicates conference regular season champion; * indicates conference tournament champion Rankings: USCHO.com; updated March 19, 2023

=== Schedule ===
Date	Opponent^{#}	Rank^{#}	Site	Decision	Result	Attendance	Record
Regular Season
September 30	LIU*	#3	Matthews Arena • Boston, Massachusetts	Philips	W 3–1	404	1–0–0 (0–0–0)
October 1	LIU*	#3	Matthews Arena • Boston, Massachusetts	Philips	W 10–1	352	2–0–0 (0–0–0)
October 7	#15 Connecticut	#3	Matthews Arena • Boston, Massachusetts	Philips	W 3–0	268	3–0–0 (1–0–0)
October 8	at #15 Connecticut	#3	Mark Edward Freitas Ice Forum • Storrs, Connecticut	Philips	W 4–1	487	4–0–0 (2–0–0)
October 14	at Merrimack	#3	Lawler Arena • North Andover, Massachusetts	Philips	W 5–0	126	5–0–0 (3–0–0)
October 15	Merrimack	#3	Matthews Arena • Boston, Massachusetts	Philips	W 4–1	486	6–0–0 (4–0–0)
October 21	at Maine	#3	Alfond Arena • Orono, Maine	Philips	W 6–1	254	7–0–0 (5–0–0)
October 22	at Maine	#3	Alfond Arena • Orono, Maine	Philips	L 0–1	288	7–1–0 (5–1–0)
October 28	at #13 Providence	#6	Schneider Arena • Providence, Rhode Island	Philips	W 4–1	235	8–1–0 (6–1–0)
October 29	#13 Providence	#6	Matthews Arena • Boston, Massachusetts (Pride Game)	Philips	T 2–2	402	8–1–1 (6–1–1)
November 4	at New Hampshire	#7	Whittemore Center • Durham, New Hampshire	Philips	W 5–0	642	9–1–1 (7–1–1)
November 5	New Hampshire	#7	Matthews Arena • Boston, Massachusetts	Philips	W 8–2	412	10–1–1 (8–1–1)
November 11	Boston College	#8	Matthews Arena • Boston, Massachusetts	Philips	W 4–0	808	11–1–1 (9–1–1)
November 12	at Boston College	#8	Conte Forum • Chestnut Hill, Massachusetts	Philips	W 2–0	366	12–1–1 (10–1–1)
November 15	at #13 Providence	#8	Schneider Arena • Providence, Rhode Island	Philips	L 0–3	111	12–2–1 (10–2–1)
November 18	Holy Cross	#8	Matthews Arena • Boston, Massachusetts	Philips	W 2–1	378	13–2–1 (11–2–1)
November 19	at Holy Cross	#8	Hart Center • Worcester, Massachusetts	Philips	W 5–2	284	14–2–1 (12–2–1)
November 25	vs. #14 Princeton*	#8	Ford Ice Center • Nashville, Tennessee (Smashville Showcase)	Philips	W 4–1	549	15–2–1 (12–2–1)
November 26	vs. #9 Cornell*	#8	Ford Ice Center • Nashville, Tennessee (Smashville Showcase)	Philips	W 5–1	642	16–2–1 (12–2–1)
December 2	#13 Vermont	#7	Matthews Arena • Boston, Massachusetts	Philips	W 3–1	378	17–2–1 (13–2–1)
December 3	#13 Vermont	#7	Matthews Arena • Boston, Massachusetts	Philips	W 5–1	503	18–2–1 (14–2–1)
January 8	Boston University	#7	Matthews Arena • Boston, Massachusetts	Philips	W 6–0	450	19–2–1 (15–2–1)
January 13	Boston College	#7	Matthews Arena • Boston, Massachusetts	Philips	W 1–0 ^{OT}	1,068	20–2–1 (16–2–1)
January 14	Maine	#7	Matthews Arena • Boston, Massachusetts	Philips	W 5–0	511	21–2–1 (17–2–1)
January 20	at Merrimack	#7	Lawler Arena • North Andover, Massachusetts	Philips	W 3–1	156	22–2–1 (18–2–1)
January 21	at #11 Vermont	#7	Gutterson Fieldhouse • Burlington, Vermont	Philips	W 3–1	643	23–2–1 (19–2–1)
January 27	Holy Cross	#7	Matthews Arena • Boston, Massachusetts	Philips	W 4–0	481	24–2–1 (20–2–1)
February 2	New Hampshire	#5	Matthews Arena • Boston, Massachusetts	Philips	W 4–1	283	25–2–1 (21–2–1)
February 7	at Boston University*	#5	Conte Forum • Chestnut Hill, Massachusetts (Women's Beanpot)	Philips	W 4–1	—	26–2–1 (21–2–1)
February 10	at #15 Connecticut	#5	Mark Edward Freitas Ice Forum • Storrs, Connecticut	Philips	W 3–2 ^{OT}	1,071	27–2–1 (22–2–1)
February 14	at #15 Boston College*	#5	Conte Forum • Chestnut Hill, Massachusetts (Women's Beanpot)	Philips	W 2–1	1,346	28–2–1 (22–2–1)
February 17	at Boston University	#5	Conte Forum • Chestnut Hill, Massachusetts	Philips	W 5–1	705	29–2–1 (23–2–1)
February 18	Boston University	#5	Matthews Arena • Boston, Massachusetts	Philips	W 4–0	782	30–2–1 (24–2–1)
WHEA Tournament
February 25	Merrimack*	#5	Matthews Arena • Boston, Massachusetts (Quarterfinals)	Philips	W 5–1	516	31–2–1
March 1	#15 Boston College*	#5	Matthews Arena • Boston, Massachusetts (Semifinals)	Philips	W 3–0	672	32–2–1
March 4	#14 Providence*	#5	Matthews Arena • Boston, Massachusetts (Championship)	Philips	W 4–1	918	33–2–1
NCAA Tournament
March 11	at #4 Yale*	#5	Ingalls Rink • New Haven, Connecticut (Quarterfinals)	Philips	W 4–1	1,544	34–2–1
March 17	vs. #1 Ohio State*	#5	AMSOIL Arena • Duluth, Minnesota (Semifinals)	Philips	L 0–3	2,149	34–3–1
*Non-conference game. ^{#}Rankings from USCHO.com Poll. Source:

== Roster ==
2022-2023 Women's Ice Hockey Roster
No.	Name	Position	Year	Height	Hometown	High School	Previous Team
1	Alexa Matses	Goaltender	SR	5'8	Boxford, MA	Phillips Academy	Boston Shamrocks
2	Lily Shannon	Forward	FR	5'10	Andover, Massachusetts	The Governor's Academy	Boston Jr. Eagles
4	Victoria Mariano	Defense	SO	5'9	Buffalo, New York	Nichols School	Toronto Aeros
6	Katy Knoll	Forward	SR	5'7	Amherst, NY	Nichols School	Toronto Aeros; USA U-18
8	Molly Griffin	Forward	JR	5'4	Arlington, MA	Buckingham Browne; Nichols	East Coast Wizards
9	Kristina Allard	Defense	FR	5'4	Kingston, New Hampshire	St. Paul's School	East Coast Wizards
10	Holly Abela	Forward	FR	5'4	Brampton, Ontario	Brampton Centennial Secondary	Brampton Junior Canadettes; Canada U-18
11	Alina Mueller	Forward	GR	5'5	Winterthur, Switzerland		Swiss National Team; Zurich Lions
12	Chloe Aurard	Forward	GR	5'6	Villard-de-Lans, France	Vermont Academy	French National Team
15	Mia Brown	Forward	GR	5'9	South Woodstock, VT	Kimball Union Academy	East Coast Wizards
16	Lily Yovetich	Defense	JR	5'4	Los Angeles, CA	Beverly Hills High School	Ottawa Lady Senators
17	Mia Langlois	Forward	FR	5'7	Windham, New Hampshire	Cushing Academy	East Coast Wizards
19	Abbey Marohn	Defense	JR	5'7	St. Joseph, MI	Culver Academy	Culver Academy
21	Maureen Murphy	Forward	GR	5'4	Buffalo, NY	Shattuck St. Mary's	USA U-18; Providence College
23	Peyton Cullaton	Forward	SR	5'7	Lakeville, MN	Lakeville North High School	Lakeville North
24	Kate Holmes	Forward	SR	5'2	Norfolk, MA	Williston Northampton School	East Coast Wizards
27	Megan Carter	Defense	SR	5'8	Milton, ON	Craig Kielburger Secondary School	Stoney Creek Jr. Sabres; Canada U-18
28	Taylor Guarino	Defense	SO	5'5	Fairfield, Connecticut	Loomis Chaffee	Fairfield Stars
35	Paige Taborski	Goaltender	SO	5'7	Roscoe, Illinois	Hononegah Community High School	Chicago Mission
37	Gwyneth Philips	Goaltender	SR	5'7	Athens, OH	Shady Side Academy	Pittsburgh Penguins Elite
41	Jules Constantinople	Defense	FR	5'5	East Haven, Connecticut	Williston Northampton School	CT Polar Bears
44	Taze Thompson	Forward	SO	5'6	Sherwood Park, Alberta	New Hampton School	Harvard
61	Lily Brazis	Forward	FR	5'5	Saugus, Massachusetts	Cushing Academy	Boston Jr. Eagles
76	Maude Poulin-Labelle	Defense	GR	5'6	Sherbrooke, Quebec	Stanstead College	Vermont
88	Skylar Irving	Forward	SO	5'8	Kingston, Massachusetts	Tabor Academy	Bay State Breakers
91	Peyton Anderson	Forward	SR	5'5	Arvada, CO	Ralston Valley High School	Team Colorado
92	Avery Anderson	Forward	FR	5'4	Arvada, CO	Ralston Valley	Belle Tire
94	Alyssa Antonakis	Forward	FR	5'6	Elko New Market, Minnesota	Minnesota Connections Academy	Belle Tire
