= 2019–20 Northeastern Huskies women's ice hockey season =

Hockey East Champions,
- Conference: WHEA

Record
- Overall: 32-4-2
- Conference: 24-3-0
- Home: 14-2-0
- Road: 15-1-1
- Neutral: 3-1-1

Coaches and captains
- Head coach: Dave Flint
- Assistant coaches: Nick Carpenito; Lindsay Berman
- Alternate captain: Matti Hartman

The Northeastern Huskies represented Northeastern University in the Women's Hockey East Association during the 2019–20 NCAA Division I women's ice hockey season. The Huskies defeated the Connecticut Huskies to win the Hockey East postseason tournament. Qualifying for the 2020 NCAA National Collegiate Women's Ice Hockey Tournament, the Huskies were scheduled to compete against the Princeton Tigers in the Quarterfinals, but the event was cancelled due to the COVID-19 pandemic.

== Offseason ==
=== Recruiting ===
Player	Position	Nationality	Notes
Alexa Matses	Goaltender	United States	Attended Phillips Academy in Andover, Massachusetts, competing as a goaltender in both ice hockey and field hockey Competed for the Boston Shamrocks
Katy Knoll	Forward	United States	Played for the Toronto Jr. Aeros of the PWHL; Competed for the United States U18 National Team

== Roster ==
=== 2019-20 Huskies ===
No.	Nat.	Player	Class	Pos	Height	DoB	Hometown	Previous team
1		Alexa Matses	Freshman	G	5' 8" (1.73 m)		Boxford, Massachusetts	Boston Shamrocks
3		Gillian Foote	Sophomore	D	6' 0" (1.83 m)		London, Ontario	Bluewater Jr. Hawks (PWHL)
4		Codie Cross	Senior	D	5' 3" (1.6 m)		Airdrie, Alberta	Canadian Under-18 National Team
6		Katy Knoll	Senior	D	5' 5" (1.65 m)		Amherst, New York	Toronto Jr. Aeros (PWHL)
8		Andrea Renner	Senior	F	5' 4" (1.63 m)		Arlington Heights, Illinois	Chicago Young Americans
16		Matti Hartman (A)	Senior	F	5' 4" (1.63 m)		Etna, New Hampshire	United States U18 National Team
21		Paige Capistran	Senior	D	5' 5" (1.65 m)		Manchester, New Hampshire	Mid Fairfield CT Stars
27		Megan Carter	Freshman	D	5' 8" (1.73 m)	2001-05-23	Milton, Ontario	Stoney Creek Jr. Sabres (Prov. WHL)

== Schedule ==
Date	Opponent^{#}	Rank^{#}	Site	Decision	Result	Record
Regular Season
October 4	at Union Dutchwomen		SCHENECTADY, N.Y.	Aerin Frankel	W 5-0	1-0-0 (0-0-0)
*Non-conference game. ^{#}Rankings from USCHO.com Poll.

== Awards and honors ==
- Aerin Frankel, Hockey Commissioners Association Women's Goaltender of the Month, November 2019
- Aerin Frankel, 2020 First Team All-American
- Katy Knoll, Women's Hockey Commissioners’ Association National Rookie of the Month, November 2019
