= List of Hockey East women's ice hockey tournament champions =

The Hockey East Championship was held in Boston from its inception in 2003 until 2006, originally at Northeastern's Matthews Arena in 2003 and 2004 before moving to Boston University's Walter Brown Arena in 2005, and then returning to Matthews Arena in 2006. It then was held at the University of New Hampshire's Whittemore Center in 2007, and at the University of Connecticut's Mark Edward Freitas Ice Forum in 2008. The tournament moved back to UNH in 2009, and then to Providence College's Schneider Arena in 2010, before returning to Boston University's Walter Brown Arena in 2011. The tournament then moved to Hyannis, Massachusetts from 2012 through 2015. Since 2016, the tournament has been held at team venues.

== Champions ==
Year	Winning team	Losing team	Score	Location	Venue	Reference
2003	Providence Friars	New Hampshire Wildcats	1–0	Boston, Massachusetts	Matthews Arena	
2004	Providence Friars	New Hampshire Wildcats	1–0	Boston, Massachusetts	Matthews Arena	
2005	Providence Friars	Connecticut Huskies	3–1	Boston, Massachusetts	Walter Brown Arena	
2006	New Hampshire Wildcats	Boston College Eagles	6–0	Boston, Massachusetts	Matthews Arena	
2007	New Hampshire Wildcats	Providence Friars	3–1	Durham, New Hampshire	Whittemore Center	
2008	New Hampshire Wildcats	Providence Friars	1–0	Storrs, Connecticut	Mark Edward Freitas Ice Forum	
2009	New Hampshire Wildcats	Boston College Eagles	2–1	Durham, New Hampshire	Whittemore Center	
2010	Boston University Terriers	Connecticut Huskies	2–1 (OT)	Providence, Rhode Island	Schneider Arena	
2011	Boston College Eagles	Northeastern Huskies	3–1	Boston, Massachusetts	Walter Brown Arena	
2012	Boston University Terriers	Providence Friars	2–1 (2OT)	Hyannis, Massachusetts	Hyannis Youth and Community Center	
2013	Boston University Terriers	Northeastern Huskies	5–2	Hyannis, Massachusetts	Hyannis Youth and Community Center	
2014	Boston University Terriers	Boston College Eagles	3–2	Hyannis, Massachusetts	Hyannis Youth and Community Center	
2015	Boston University Terriers	Boston College Eagles	4–1	Hyannis, Massachusetts	Hyannis Youth and Community Center	
2016	Boston College Eagles	Boston University Terriers	5–0	North Andover, Massachusetts	Lawler Arena	
2017	Boston College Eagles	Northeastern Huskies	2–1 (OT)	Boston, Massachusetts	Walter Brown Arena	
2018	Northeastern Huskies	Connecticut Huskies	2–1	Boston, Massachusetts	Matthews Arena	
2019	Northeastern Huskies	Boston College Eagles	3–2 (OT)	Providence, Rhode Island	Schneider Arena	
2020	Northeastern Huskies	Connecticut Huskies	9–1	North Andover, Massachusetts	Lawler Arena	
2021	Northeastern Huskies	Providence Friars	6–2	Boston, Massachusetts	Matthews Arena	
2022	Northeastern Huskies	Connecticut Huskies	3-1	Boston, Massachusetts	Matthews Arena	
2023	Northeastern Huskies	Providence Friars	4-1	Boston, Massachusetts	Matthews Arena	
2024	Connecticut Huskies	Northeastern Huskies	1–0 (OT)	Storrs, Connecticut	Toscano Family Ice Forum	
2025	Boston University Terriers	Northeastern Huskies	3–2 (OT)	Storrs, Connecticut	Toscano Family Ice Forum	
2026	Connecticut Huskies	Northeastern Huskies	2–1 (2OT)	Storrs, Connecticut	Toscano Family Ice Forum	

=== Championships by School ===
School	Championships	Appearances	Winning Percentage
Northeastern	6	11	.545
Boston University	6	7	.857
New Hampshire	4	7	.571
Boston College	3	8	.375
Providence	3	8	.375
Connecticut	1	4	.250

== Performance by team ==
The code in each cell represents the furthest the team made it in the respective tournament:

- – Team not in Hockey East
- FR Preliminary / First round (2 teams in 2021, 4 teams afterwards)
- QF Quarterfinals (4 teams from 2009 to 2012, 8 teams afterwards)
- SF Semifinals
- F Finals
- CH Champion

School	#	QF	SF	F	CH	03	04	05	06	07	08	09	10	11	12	13	14	15	16	17	18	19	20	21	22	23	24	25	26
Northeastern	19	17	17	12	6		SF					QF	QF	F	SF	F	SF	SF	SF	F	CH	CH	CH	CH	CH	CH	F	F	F
Boston University	19	15	12	7	6	–	–	–			SF	SF	CH	SF	CH	CH	CH	CH	F	SF	QF	SF	QF	QF	QF	FR	FR	CH	QF
New Hampshire	23	13	10	6	4	F	F	SF	CH	CH	CH	CH	SF		QF	QF	QF	QF	QF	QF	QF	QF	SF	QF	FR	QF	SF	FR	QF
Boston College	21	15	16	8	3			SF	F	SF		F	QF	CH	SF	SF	F	F	CH	CH	SF	F	QF	QF	QF	SF	SF	SF	QF
Providence	24	17	14	8	3	CH	CH	CH	SF	F	F	SF	SF	SF	F	SF	QF	QF	QF	QF	QF	SF	QF	F	QF	F	QF	QF	FR
Connecticut	21	17	14	7	2	SF		F		SF	SF	QF	F	QF		QF	QF	SF	SF	QF	F	QF	F	SF	F	QF	CH	SF	CH
Maine	17	13	7	0	0	SF	SF		SF					QF	QF	QF	QF	QF	QF		SF		SF	SF	SF	QF	FR	QF	QF
Vermont	14	14	5	0	0	–	–	–								QF	SF	QF	QF	SF	QF	QF	QF	QF	SF	SF	QF	QF	SF
Holy Cross	6	2	1	0	0	–	–	–	–	–	–	–	–	–	–	–	–	–	–	–				FR	FR	FR	QF	FR	SF
Merrimack	7	6	0	0	0	–	–	–	–	–	–	–	–	–	–	–	–	–		QF		QF			QF	QF	QF	QF	FR
