= 2022–23 Vermont Catamounts women's ice hockey season =

NCAA Division I women's hockey season

- Conference: WHEA
- Home ice: Gutterson Fieldhouse

Rankings
- USA Today: #11
- USCHO.com: #11

Record
- Overall: 21-10-3
- Conference: 16-8-3
- Home: 11-3-2
- Road: 10-7-1

Coaches and captains
- Head coach: Jim Plumer
- Assistant coaches: Jess Koizumi; Alex Gettens
- Captain(s): Alex Gray; Sini Karjalainen; Theresa Schafzahl
- Alternate captain: Maddy Skelton

The 2022–23 Vermont Catamounts women's ice hockey season will represent University of Vermont during the 2022–23 NCAA Division I women's ice hockey season.

== Offseason ==
=== Recruiting ===
Player	Position	Class	Previous school
Lara Beecher	F	Incoming freshman	
Sofie Skott Dahl	D	Incoming freshman	
Julia Mesplede	F	Incoming freshman	
Krista Parkkonen	D	Incoming freshman	
Ellie Simmons	G	Incoming freshman	

=== Departures ===
Player	Position	Class	Destination
Alyssa Holmes	F	Montreal Force	
Antonia Matzka	D	Buffalo Beauts	
Reagan Miller	F	Sophomore	Left program
Maude Poulin-Labelle	D	Graduate	Northeastern
Kristina Shanahan	F	Montreal Force	
Blanka Škodová	G	Graduate	Minnesota Duluth

== Regular season ==
=== Standings ===
- 2022–23 WHEA standings
  	Conference							Overall					
  	GP	W	L	T	PTS	GF	GA	GP	W	L	T	GF	GA
  #4 Northeastern †*	27	24	2	1	72	100	23	38	34	3	1	144	35
  #11 Vermont	27	16	8	3	56	81	49	36	22	11	3	105	65
  #13 Providence	27	15	8	4	49	74	51	37	22	11	4	104	72
  #15 Boston College	27	16	11	0	47	67	49	36	20	15	1	88	69
  UConn	27	12	11	4	44	50	52	35	18	13	4	75	64
  Maine	27	12	13	2	37	56	74	35	15	18	2	76	104
  Boston University	27	9	15	3	33	56	73	34	11	20	3	73	94
  New Hampshire	27	9	15	3	32	65	80	36	12	21	3	84	106
  Holy Cross	27	6	21	0	18	34	81	34	7	26	1	47	103
  Merrimack	27	5	20	2	17	44	95	36	9	25	2	66	126
  Championship: March 4, 2023 † indicates conference regular season champion; * indicates conference tournament champion Rankings: USCHO.com; updated March 19, 2023

=== Schedule ===
Date	Opponent^{#}	Rank^{#}	Site	Decision	Result	Record
Regular Season
September 30	RIT*	#14	Gutterson Fieldhouse • Burlington, Vermont	McPherson	W 5–2	1–0–0 (0–0–0)
October 1	RIT*	#14	Gutterson Fieldhouse • Burlington, Vermont	McPherson	W 5–2	2–0–0 (0–0–0)
October 8	at Holy Cross	#14	Hart Center • Worcester, Massachusetts	McPherson	L 1–2	2–1–0 (0–1–0)
October 9	at Holy Cross	#14	Hart Center • Worcester, Massachusetts	McPherson	W 3–0	3–1–0 (1–1–0)
October 14	Connecticut		Gutterson Fieldhouse • Burlington, Vermont	McPherson	T 1–1	3–1–1 (1–1–1)
October 15	Connecticut		Gutterson Fieldhouse • Burlington, Vermont	McPherson	W 6–1	4–1–1 (2–1–1)
October 21	at #6 Colgate*	#14	Class of 1965 Arena • Hamilton, New York	McPherson	L 1–4	4–2–1 (2–1–1)
October 22	at #6 Colgate*	#14	Class of 1965 Arena • Hamilton, New York	McPherson	L 2–3	4–3–1 (2–1–1)
October 28	#15 Boston College	#13	Gutterson Fieldhouse • Burlington, Vermont	McPherson	W 3–2	5–3–1 (3–1–1)
October 29	#15 Boston College	#13	Gutterson Fieldhouse • Burlington, Vermont	McPherson	L 3–4 ^{ot}	5–4–1 (3–2–1)
November 4	at Maine	#13	Alfond Arena • Orono, Maine	McPherson	W 6–1	6–4–1 (4–2–1)
November 5	at Maine	#13	Alfond Arena • Orono, Maine	McPherson	W 7–2	7–4–1 (5–2–1)
November 11	Boston University	#13	Gutterson Fieldhouse • Burlington, Vermont	McPherson	W 2–1	8–4–1 (6–2–1)
November 12	Boston University	#13	Gutterson Fieldhouse • Burlington, Vermont	McPherson	L 3–4 ^{ot}	8–5–1 (6–3–1)
November 17	at Merrimack	#14	Lawler Arena • North Andover, Massachusetts	McPherson	W 5–1	9–5–1 (7–3–1)
November 18	at Merrimack	#14	Lawler Arena • North Andover, Massachusetts	Correa	W 3–0	10–5–1 (8–3–1)
November 29	Dartmouth*	#13	Gutterson Fieldhouse • Burlington, Vermont	McPherson	W 4–1	11–5–1 (8–3–1)
December 2	at Northeastern	#13	Matthews Arena • Boston, Massachusetts	McPherson	L 1–3	11–6–1 (8–4–1)
December 3	at Northeastern	#13	Matthews Arena • Boston, Massachusetts	McPherson	L 1–5	11–7–1 (8–5–1)
December 9	at Syracuse*	#13	Tennity Ice Skating Pavilion • Syracuse, New York	McPherson	W 3–1	12–7–1 (8–5–1)
December 10	at Syracuse*	#13	Tennity Ice Pavilion • Syracuse, New York	McPherson	W 2–1	13–7–1 (8–5–1)
January 6	#9 Providence	#13	Gutterson Fieldhouse • Burlington, Vermont	McPherson	W 2–0	14–7–1 (9–5–1)
January 7	#9 Providence	#13	Gutterson Fieldhouse • Burlington, Vermont	McPherson	W 4–1	15–7–1 (10–5–1)
January 13	at #13 Providence	#11	Schneider Arena • Providence, Rhode Island	McPherson	W 3–0	16–7–1 (11–5–1)
January 14	at #15 Connecticut	#11	Mark Edward Freitas Ice Forum • Storrs, Connecticut	McPherson	L 1–4	16–8–1 (11–6–1)
January 20	Holy Cross	#11	Gutterson Fieldhouse • Burlington, Vermont	McPherson	W 3–1	17–8–1 (12–6–1)
January 21	#7 Northeastern	#11	Gutterson Fieldhouse • Burlington, Vermont	McPherson	L 1–3	17–9–1 (12–7–1)
January 27	at Boston College	#11	Conte Forum • Chestnut Hill, Massachusetts	McPherson	W 3–2	18–9–1 (13–7–1)
January 28	at Boston University	#11	Walter Brown Arena • Boston, Massachusetts	McPherson	L 1–2 ^{ot}	18–10–1 (13–8–1)
February 3	Merrimack	#11	Gutterson Fieldhouse • Burlington, Vermont	McPherson	W 6–2	19–10–1 (14–8–1)
February 10	New Hampshire	#11	Gutterson Fieldhouse • Burlington, Vermont	McPherson	T 3–3	19–10–2 (14–8–2)
February 11	Maine	#11	Gutterson Fieldhouse • Burlington, Vermont	McPherson	W 3–0	20–10–2 (15–8–2)
February 17	at New Hampshire	#11	Whittemore Center • Durham, New Hampshire	McPherson	T 3–3 ^{ot}	20–10–3 (15–8–3)
February 18	at New Hampshire	#11	Whittemore Center • Durham, New Hampshire	McPherson	W 3–1	21–10–3 (16–8–3)
Hockey East Tournament
February 25	vs. New Hampshire	#11	Gutterson Fieldhouse • Burlington, Vermont (Quarterfinals)	McPherson	W 2–1 ^{ot}	22–10–3 (16–8–3)
March 1	vs. Providence	#11	Gutterson Fieldhouse • Burlington, Vermont (Semifinals)	McPherson	L 0–1	22–11–3 (16–8–3)
*Non-conference game. ^{#}Rankings from USCHO.com Poll. Source:

== Roster ==
2022-2023 Women's Ice Hockey Roster
No.	Name	Position	Year	Height	Hometown	Previous Team
2	Sini Karjalainen	Defense	GR	5'8	Posio, Finland	Finland U-18 National Team
3	Bella Parento	Defense	JR	5'5	Montpelier, Vermont	Kimball Union Academy
5	Cam Morrissey	Defense	SR	5'6	Troy, Michigan	Selects Hockey
6	Evelyne Blais-Savoie	Forward	SO	5'9	San Jose, California	Meijer AAA Hockey 19U
8	Anna Podein	Defense	RS FR	5'8	Minneapolis, Minnesota	Benilde-St. Margaret's
9	Julia Mesplede	Forward	FR	5'2	Bordeaux, France	France National Team
10	Lara Beecher	Forward	FR	5'5	Buffalo, New York	Philadelphia Junior Flyers
11	Ellice Murphy	Defense	GR	5'4	Roseau, Minnesota	Roseau High School
12	Maddy Skelton	Forward	JR	5'6	Isanti, Minnesota	North Wright County
13	Lilly Holmes	Forward	GR	5'5	Saratoga Springs, New York	Westminster
14	Krista Parkkonen	Defense	FR	5'6	Lappeenranta, Finland	Finland U-18 National Team
17	Theresa Schafzahl	Forward	GR	5'8	Weiz, Austria	Austria National Team
22	Alex Gray	Forward	GR	5'7	Brownlee, Saskatchewan	Stanstead College
23	Hailey Burns	Forward	SR	5'5	Kirkland, Quebec	John Abbott College
24	Corinne McCool	Forward	GR	5'8	West Roxbury, Massachusetts	Lawrence Academy
27	Sofie Skott Dahl	Defense	FR	5'8	Herning, Denmark	Denmark National Team
35	Ellie Simmons	Goalie	FR	5'8	Buffalo, New York	Nichols School
38	Sydney Correa	Goalie	SO	5'6	Georgetown, Massachusetts	Brooks School
43	Alaina Tanski	Forward	SO	5'4	Hermantown, Minnesota	Pittsburgh Penguins Elite
49	Sara Levesque	Defense	SR	5'3	Chicoutimi, Quebec	John Abbott College
66	Lily Humphrey	Forward	SR	5'5	Huntington Beach, California	New Hampton School
68	Tynka Pátková	Forward	RS JR	5'5	Meziboří, Czech Republic	HTI Stars
91	Jessie McPherson	Goalie	JR	5'9	Chatham, Ontario	Cambridge Rivulettes
96	Natálie Mlýnková	Forward	JR	5'3	Zlín, Czech Republic	HTI Stars

== Awards and honors ==
- Corinne McCool named Hockey East Player of the Week (October 3, 2022).
- Corinne McCool named University of Vermont TD Bank Student-Athlete of the Week (October 5, 2022).
- Theresa Schafzahl sets program record with most points in program history (October 9, 2022).
- Theresa Schafzahl named University of Vermont TD Bank Student-Athlete of the Week (October 11, 2022).
- Lara Beecher named Hockey East Rookie of the Week (October 18, 2022).
- Natálie Mlýnková named University of Vermont TD Bank Student-Athlete of the Week (November 9, 2022).
- Natálie Mlýnková named Hockey East Player of the Month (Month of November).
- Ellice Murphy named Hockey East Defender of the Month (Month of November).
- Lara Beecher names Hockey East Rookie of the Month (Month of January).
- Theresa Schafzahl named University of Vermont TD Bank Student-Athlete of the Week (February 16, 2023).
- Lara Beecher named to Hockey East All-Rookie Team (February 22, 2023).
- Sini Karjalainen named Hockey East Defender of the Year (February 22, 2023).
- Sini Karjalainen named to Hockey East First Team All-Star (February 24, 2023).
- Theresa Schafzahl named to Hockey East First Team All-Star (February 24, 2023).
- Natálie Mlýnková named to Hockey East Third Team All-Star (February 24, 2023).
- Jessie McPherson named to Hockey East Third Team All-Star (February 24, 2023).
- Lara Beecher named Hockey East Rookie of the Year (March 1, 2023).
