= Dave Flint =

American ice hockey coach

Dave Carl Flint
Current position
- Title: Head coach
- Team: Northeastern
- Conference: Hockey East
- Record: 397–174–47

Biographical details
- Born: August 17, 1971 (age 55); Merrimack, New Hampshire

Coaching career (HC unless noted)
- 1996–2003: Saint Anselm (Assistant)
- 2004–2008: Saint Anselm
- 2009–present: Northeastern

Head coaching record
- Overall: 485–189–48

Accomplishments and honors

Awards
- 4× Hockey East Coach of the Year (2012, 2019, 2020, 2021); 2× AHCA Coach of the Year (2021, 2023)

Dave Flint (born August 17, 1971) is an American ice hockey coach. He is the current head coach for Northeastern. He previously served as the head coach for Saint Anselm's women's ice hockey team.

== Coaching career ==
=== Saint Anselm College ===
Flint served as an assistant coach for the Saint Anselm Hawks men's hockey team for seven years. He then took over the women's hockey team in 2003 and oversaw the program's transition to varsity status. In their first varsity season, he led St. Anselm to a 21–3–1 record and an ECAC Open championship in 2004–05. The Hawks then won consecutive ECAC Open titles in his final two seasons with the team in 2006–07 and 2007–08. During his four-year tenure as head coach, he compiled an 88–15–2 record, and was named the ECAC East Coach of the Year three times, and was a three-time finalist for National Coach of the Year.

=== Northeastern University ===
During the 2015–16 season, he led the Huskies to a 28–9–1 record, and reached the NCAA Women's Ice Hockey Tournament for the first time in program history. On September 11, 2017, Flint signed a four-year contract extension with Northeastern through the 2020–21 season. During the 2019–20 season, he led the Huskies to an NCAA best 32–4–2 record, their winningest season in program history and was named Hockey East Coach of the Year, and New England Coach of the Year.

During the 2020–21 season, he led the Huskies to a 22–2–1 record, their fourth consecutive Hockey East championship, and the NCAA Women's Ice Hockey Tournament for the fourth consecutive year. They advanced to the National Championship game for the first time in program history where they lost to Wisconsin 1–2 in overtime. Following the season, he was named Hockey East Coach the Year for the third consecutive year, and AHCA Coach of the Year.

On May 6, 2021, Flint signed a four-year contract extension with Northeastern through the 2024–25 season. During the 2022–23 season, he led the Huskies to a 34–2–1 record, their sixth consecutive Hockey East championship and the Frozen Four for the third consecutive year. Following the season, he was named AHCA Coach of the Year.

=== Team USA ===
Since 2005, Flint has also been a member of the USA Hockey staff. In 2008, he was appointed the goaltending coach and advisor for the women's national program, where he evaluated and instructed goaltenders at all levels. On April 24, 2008, he was named an assistant coach for U.S. Women's Select Team at the Four Nations Cup.

On May 25, 2009, Flint was named an assistant coach for the United States women's national ice hockey team at the 2009 IIHF Women's World Championship. On June 7, 2009, he was named an assistant coach for the United States women's national ice hockey team at the 2010 Winter Olympics.

== Head coaching record ==
Record table
Season	Team	Overall	Conference	Standing	Postseason
Saint Anselm College (ECAC East) (2004–2008)
2004–05	Saint Anselm	21–3–1	8–2–1	7th	
2005–06	Saint Anselm	20–7–0	17–2–0	2nd	
2006–07	Saint Anselm	24–3–0	18–1–0	1st	
2007–08	Saint Anselm	23–2–1	17–1–1	1st	
Saint Anselm:		88–15–2	60–6–2		
Northeastern University (Hockey East) (2008–present)
2008–09	Northeastern	12–20–3	7–13–1	6th	
2010–11	Northeastern	16–13–8	6–10–5	5th	
2011–12	Northeastern	22–7–4	15–3–3	1st	
2012–13	Northeastern	23–11–2	13–7–1	3rd	
2013–14	Northeastern	19–14–2	13–6–2	3rd	
2014–15	Northeastern	14–17–5	11–8–2	3rd	
2015–16	Northeastern	28–9–1	20–4–0	2nd	NCAA Quarterfinals
2016–17	Northeastern	22–12–3	14–8–2	2nd	
2017–18	Northeastern	19–17–3	11–11–2	4th	NCAA Quarterfinals
2018–19	Northeastern	27–6–5	21–3–3	1st	NCAA Quarterfinals
2019–20	Northeastern	32–4–2	24–3–0	1st	NCAA Tournament cancelled
2020–21	Northeastern	22–2–1	17–1–1	1st	NCAA Runner-up
2021–22	Northeastern	31–5–2	21–3–2	1st	NCAA Frozen Four
2022–23	Northeastern	34–3–1	24–2–1	1st	NCAA Frozen Four
2023–24	Northeastern	25–11–3	16–8–3	2nd	
2024–25	Northeastern	22–14–1	15–11–1	5th	
2025–26	Northeastern	29–9–1	21–2–1	1st	NCAA Frozen Four
Northeastern:		397–174–47	269–103–30		
Total:		485–189–48			
National champion Postseason invitational champion Conference regular season champion Conference regular season and conference tournament champion Division regular season champion Division regular season and conference tournament champion Conference tournament champion

== See also ==
- List of college women's ice hockey career coaching wins leaders
