= 2022–23 NCAA Division I women's ice hockey season =

Women's ice hockey season

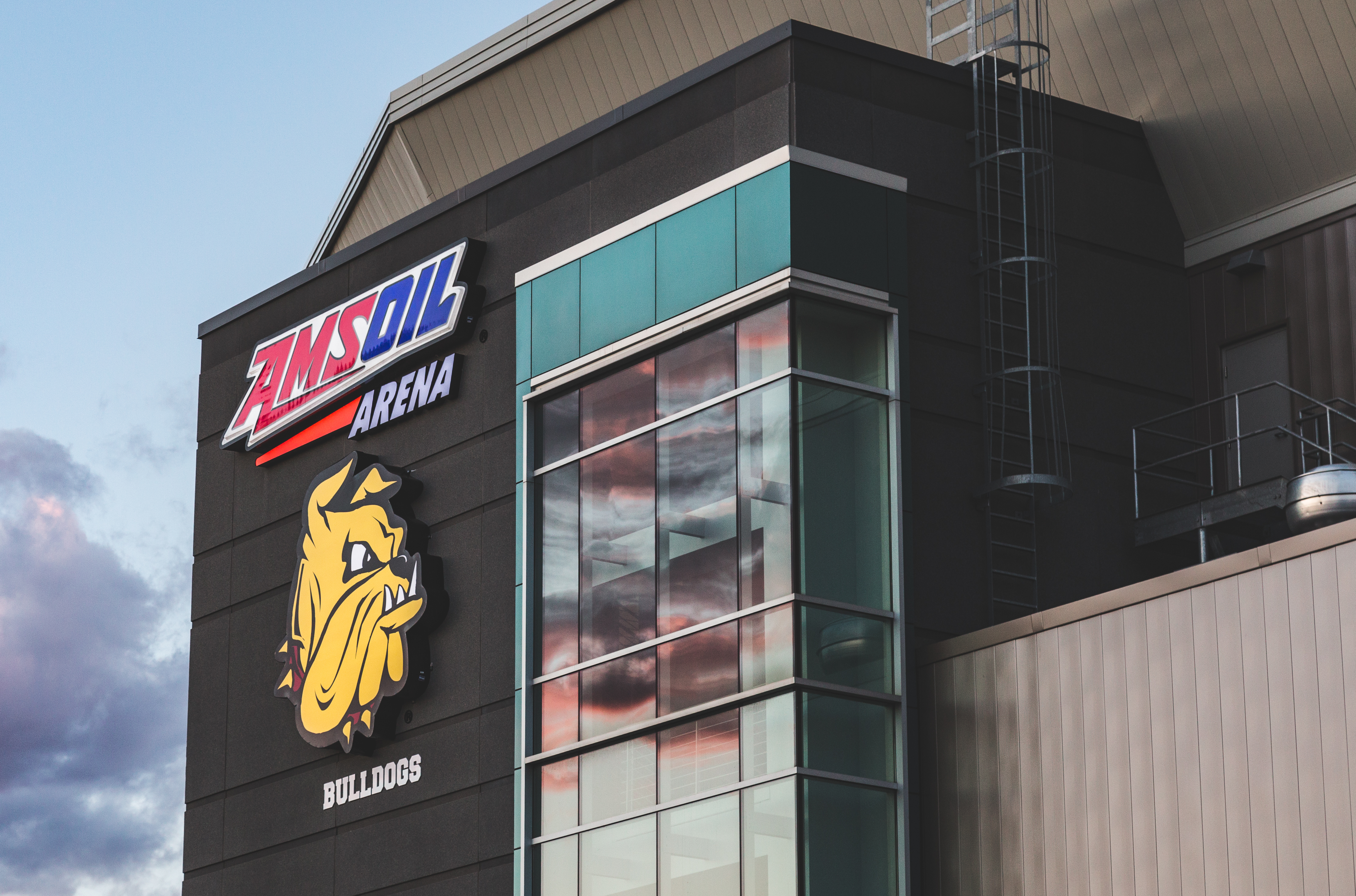
- AMSOIL Arena in Duluth, MN is the site for the 2023 Frozen Four (Women), hosted by the University of Minnesota Duluth
- NCAA tournament: 2023
- National championship: AMSOIL Arena; Duluth, Minnesota
- NCAA champion: Wisconsin
- Patty Kazmaier Award: Sophie Jaques (Ohio State)

The 2022–23 NCAA Division I women's ice hockey season began in September 2022 and ended with the 2023 NCAA National Collegiate women's ice hockey tournament's championship game at AMSOIL Arena in Duluth, Minnesota on March 19, 2023.

== Regular season ==
=== Realignment ===
The Stonehill Skyhawks are set to join the NEWHA for the 2022–23 season.

=== Standings ===
- 2022–23 College Hockey America standings
  	Conference							Overall					
  	GP	W	L	T	PTS	GF	GA	GP	W	L	T	GF	GA
  #10 Penn State †*	16	14	1	1	29	78	25	38	27	9	2	140	73
  Mercyhurst	16	11	3	2	24	49	25	37	21	14	2	120	80
  Syracuse	16	6	9	1	13	35	57	36	10	24	2	78	118
  Lindenwood	16	5	11	0	10	33	54	32	5	27	0	55	145
  RIT	16	1	13	2	4	21	55	32	4	26	2	50	107
  Championship: March 4, 2023 † indicates conference regular season champion; * indicates conference tournament champion Rankings: USCHO.com; updated March 19, 2023
- 2022–23 ECAC Hockey standings
  	Conference							Overall					
  	GP	W	L	T	PTS	GF	GA	GP	W	L	T	GF	GA
  #6 Yale †	22	19	2	1	58	93	34	33	28	4	1	132	49
  #5 Colgate *	22	18	3	1	56	94	37	40	32	6	2	164	69
  #8 Quinnipiac	22	17	5	0	50	78	39	40	30	10	0	130	68
  #9 Clarkson	22	15	6	1	44	60	38	42	29	11	2	124	76
  #14 Cornell	22	12	9	1	38	78	70	32	16	14	2	102	98
  St. Lawrence	22	10	9	3	32	60	49	39	17	19	3	103	90
  Princeton	22	10	12	0	30	55	60	31	15	15	1	81	82
  Harvard	22	6	13	3	21	45	69	31	7	21	3	54	107
  Brown	22	7	15	0	19	37	63	29	9	19	1	48	80
  RPI	22	4	17	1	16	27	65	34	9	24	1	53	89
  Dartmouth	22	4	18	0	14	39	82	29	8	1	0	56	96
  Union	22	4	17	1	12	27	89	34	11	22	1	59	121
  Championship: March 4, 2023 † indicates conference regular season champion; * indicates conference tournament champion Rankings: USCHO.com; updated March 19, 2023
- 2022–23 NEWHA standings
  	Conference							Overall					
  	GP	W	L	T	PTS	GF	GA	GP	W	L	T	GF	GA
  LIU †*	24	17	4	3	37	–	–	37	20	14	3	–	–
  Franklin Pierce	27	15	9	3	33	–	–	36	18	15	3	–	–
  Saint Anselm	24	14	6	4	32	–	–	39	18	17	4	–	–
  Stonehill	24	14	9	1	29	–	–	37	19	16	2	–	–
  Sacred Heart	28	13	12	2	28	–	–	37	16	18	3	–	–
  Post	24	4	19	1	9	–	–	35	4	29	2	–	–
  Saint Michael's	24	1	19	4	6	–	–	32	2	26	4	–	–
  Championship: March 4, 2023 † indicates conference regular season champion; * indicates conference tournament champion Rankings: USCHO.com; updated March 19, 2023
- 2022–23 Western Collegiate Hockey Association standings
  	Conference								Overall					
  	GP	W	L	T	SOW	PTS	GF	GA	GP	W	L	T	GF	GA
  #2 Ohio State †	28	23	4	1	1	70	119	52	40	33	6	2	169	71
  #3 Minnesota *	28	22	3	3	1	68	126	52	39	30	6	3	177	72
  #1 Wisconsin	27	19	6	2	1	60	113	46	40	29	10	2	169	67
  #7 Minnesota Duluth	28	17	8	3	2	54	87	44	39	26	10	3	125	53
  #12 St. Cloud State	28	11	16	1	0	36	57	82	37	18	18	1	87	96
  Minnesota State	28	9	18	1	0	30	55	92	36	15	20	1	91	105
  St. Thomas	28	3	24	1	1	12	30	110	36	8	27	1	53	130
  Bemidji State	28	2	26	0	0	6	23	130	36	5	30	1	40	154
  Championship: March 4, 2023 † indicates conference regular season champion; * indicates conference tournament champion Rankings: USCHO.com; updated March 19, 2023
- 2022–23 WHEA standings
  	Conference							Overall					
  	GP	W	L	T	PTS	GF	GA	GP	W	L	T	GF	GA
  #4 Northeastern †*	27	24	2	1	72	100	23	38	34	3	1	144	35
  #11 Vermont	27	16	8	3	56	81	49	36	22	11	3	105	65
  #13 Providence	27	15	8	4	49	74	51	37	22	11	4	104	72
  #15 Boston College	27	16	11	0	47	67	49	36	20	15	1	88	69
  UConn	27	12	11	4	44	50	52	35	18	13	4	75	64
  Maine	27	12	13	2	37	56	74	35	15	18	2	76	104
  Boston University	27	9	15	3	33	56	73	34	11	20	3	73	94
  New Hampshire	27	9	15	3	32	65	80	36	12	21	3	84	106
  Holy Cross	27	6	21	0	18	34	81	34	7	26	1	47	103
  Merrimack	27	5	20	2	17	44	95	36	9	25	2	66	126
  Championship: March 4, 2023 † indicates conference regular season champion; * indicates conference tournament champion Rankings: USCHO.com; updated March 19, 2023

== Player stats ==
=== Scoring leaders ===
The following players lead the NCAA in points at the conclusion of games played on March 19, 2023.

Player	Class	Team	GP	G	A	Pts
Danielle Serdachny	Senior	Colgate	40	25	46	71
Taylor Heise	Graduate Student	Minnesota	39	30	37	67
Grace Zumwinkle	Graduate Student	Minnesota	39	25	36	61
Alina Müller	Graduate Student	Northeastern	38	27	33	60
Kalty Kaltounkova	Junior	Colgate	39	24	33	57
Jennifer Gardiner	Senior	Ohio State	41	21	36	57
Maureen Murphy	Graduate Student	Northeastern	33	20	35	55
Chloé Aurard	Graduate Student	Northeastern	38	20	34	54
Gabrielle David	Senior	Clarkson	42	21	32	53
Anne Cherkowski	Junior	Clarkson	40	23	29	52
Elle Hartje	Senior	Yale	33	13	39	52

=== Leading goaltenders ===
The following goaltenders lead the NCAA in goals against average.

GP = Games played; Min = Minutes played; W = Wins; L = Losses; T = Ties; GA = Goals against; SO = Shutouts; SV% = Save percentage; GAA = Goals against average

Player	Class	Team	GP	Min	W	L	T	GA	SO	SV%	GAA
Gwyneth Philips	Senior	Northeastern	38	2271:56	34	3	1	33	10	0.960	0.87
Emma Söderberg	Graduate Student	Minnesota Duluth	33	1942:21	21	10	2	45	12	0.938	1.39
Pia Dukarič	Sophomore	Yale	33	1905:05	28	4	1	45	8	0.935	1.42
Hannah Murphy	Sophomore	Colgate	22	1294:41	18	2	1	33	5	0.932	1.53
Cami Kronish	Senior	Wisconsin	31	1882:44	21	8	2	49	8	0.932	1.56

== NCAA Tournament ==
First Round; March 9
Penn State	2
Quinnipiac	3***
Clarkson	0
Minnesota Duluth	2
LIU	1
Wisconsin	9

National Quarterfinals; March 11
Quinnipiac	2
1	Ohio State	5
5	Northeastern	4
4	Yale	1
Minnesota Duluth	0
2	Minnesota	3
Wisconsin	4
3	Colgate	2

National Semifinals; March 17
1	Ohio State	3
5	Northeastern	0
2	Minnesota	2
Wisconsin	3*

National Championship; March 19
1	Ohio State	0
Wisconsin	1

Note: each * denotes one overtime period

== Awards ==
=== Patty Kazmaier Award ===
Patty Kazmaier Award Finalists
Player	Position	School
Sophie Jaques	Defender	Ohio State
Alina Müller	Forward	NortheasternTop Three
Danielle Serdachny	Forward	Colgate Top Three
Pia Dukaric	Goaltender	Yale
Jennifer Gardiner	Forward	Ohio State
Taylor Heise	Forward	Minnesota
Maureen Murphy	Forward	Northeastern
Gwyneth Philips	Goaltender	Northeastern
Kiara Zanon	Forward	Penn State
Grace Zumwinkle	Forward	Minnesota

=== AHCA Coach of the year ===
AHCA Coach of the Year Finalists
Coach	School
Dave Flint	Northeastern
Mark Bolding	Yale
Brad Frost	Minnesota
Brian Idalski	St. Cloud State
Mark Johnson	Wisconsin
Jeff Kampersal	Penn State
Nadine Muzerall	Ohio State
Tara Watchorn	Stonehill
