= 2021–22 NCAA Division I women's ice hockey rankings =

Women's ice hockey rankings

- NCAA tournament: 2022
- Preseason No. 1 (USA Today): Wisconsin
- Preseason No. 1 (USCHO): Wisconsin
- NCAA Division I women's ice hockey rankings

Two polls make up the 2021–22 NCAA Division I women's ice hockey rankings, the USCHO.com poll and the USA Today/USA Hockey Magazine poll. As the 2021–22 season progresses, rankings are updated weekly.

== Legend ==
| | Increase in ranking |
| | Decrease in ranking |
| | Not ranked previous week |
| Italics | Number of first place votes |
| (#-#) | Win–loss–tie record |
| т | Tied with team above or below also with this symbol |

== USCHO ==
| | Preseason Sep 20 | Week 1 Sep 27 | Week 2 Oct 4 | Week 3 Oct 11 | Week 4 Oct 18 | Week 5 Oct 25 | Week 6 Nov 1 | Week 7 Nov 8 | Week 8 Nov 15 | Week 9 Nov 22 | Week 10 Nov 29 | Week 11 Dec 6 | Week 12 Dec 13 | Week 13 Jan 3 | Week 14 Jan 10 | Week 15 Jan 17 | Week 16 Jan 24 | Week 17 Jan 31 | Week 18 Feb 7 | Week 19 Feb 14 | Week 20 Feb 21 | Week 21 Feb 28 | Final Mar 7 | |
|---|---|---|---|---|---|---|---|---|---|---|---|---|---|---|---|---|---|---|---|---|---|---|---|---|
| 1. | Wisconsin (13) | Wisconsin (2–0–0) (14) | Wisconsin (4–0–0) (12) | Wisconsin (6–0–0) (15) | Wisconsin (8–0–0) (15) | Wisconsin (10–0–0) (15) | Wisconsin (12–0–0) (15) | Wisconsin (13–0–1) (15) | Wisconsin (13–0–1) (15) | Wisconsin (15–0–1) (15) | Wisconsin (15–0–1) (15) | Wisconsin (15–1–2) (11) | Wisconsin (17–1–2) (14) | Wisconsin (18–1–3) (15) | Wisconsin (18–1–3) (15) | Wisconsin (18–1–3) (15) | Northeastern (21–2–1) (6) | Minnesota (20–7–1) (9) | Minnesota (22–7–1) (13) | Minnesota (24–7–1) (14) | Minnesota (26–7–1) (12) | Minnesota (28–7–1) (13) | Ohio State (29–6–0) (15) | 1. |
| 2. | Northeastern (2) | Northeastern (0–0–0) (1) | Northeastern (2–0–0) (1) | Ohio State (4–0–0) | Ohio State (6–0–0) | Ohio State (6–2–0) | Ohio State (8–2–0) | Ohio State (10–2–0) | Ohio State (10–2–0) | Ohio State (12–2–0) | Ohio State (14–2–0) | Ohio State (15–3–0) | Ohio State (15–3–0) | Ohio State (15–3–0) | Ohio State (17–3–0) | Ohio State (17–3–0) | Minnesota (19–6–1) (4) | Ohio State (19–5–0) (3) | Ohio State (21–5–0) (2) | Ohio State (23–6–0) (1) | Ohio State (25–6–0) (3) | Ohio State (27–6–0) (2) | Minnesota (29–8–1) | 2. |
| 3. | Ohio State | Ohio State (2–0–0) | Ohio State (4–0–0) (2) | Colgate (6–0–0) | Colgate (8–0–0) | Minnesota (5–3–0) | Minnesota (7–3–0) | Minnesota (7–3–0) | Minnesota (9–3–0) | Minnesota (11–3–0) | Northeastern (14–2–1) | Northeastern (16–2–1) (2) | Northeastern (16–2–1) | Northeastern (16–2–1) | Northeastern (18–2–1) | Northeastern (19–2–1) | Ohio State (18–4–0) (3) т | Northeastern (21–3–1) (2) | Wisconsin (21–4–4) | Wisconsin (23–4–4) | Northeastern (27–4–2) | Northeastern (28–4–2) | Northeastern (30–4–2) | 3. |
| 4. | Minnesota | Colgate (2–0–0) т | Colgate (4–0–0) | Boston College (3–0–0) | Boston College (5–0–0) | Boston College (6–0–0) | Colgate (10–2–0) | Northeastern (8–2–1) | Northeastern (10–2–1) | Northeastern (12–2–1) | Quinnipiac (15–1–2) | Minnesota (13–4–1) | Quinnipiac (15–1–2) (1) | Quinnipiac (15–2–3) | Minnesota (16–5–1) | Quinnipiac (15–3–3) | Wisconsin (18–3–3) (2) т | Wisconsin (19–3–4) (1) | Minnesota Duluth (18–9–0) | Northeastern (25–4–1) | Wisconsin (23–6–4) | Wisconsin (25–6–4) | Colgate (30–7–1) | 4. |
| 5. | Minnesota Duluth | Minnesota (0–0–0) т | Boston College (2–0–0) | Northeastern (2–2–0) | Minnesota (3–3–0) | Colgate (8–2–0) | Northeastern (7–2–0) | Colgate (11–3–0) | Colgate (13–3–0) | Quinnipiac (13–1–2) | Minnesota (12–4–0) | Quinnipiac (15–1–2) (2) | Minnesota (14–5–1) | Minnesota (14–5–1) | Quinnipiac (15–3–3) | Minnesota (17–6–1) | Minnesota Duluth (14–8–0) | Minnesota Duluth (16–8–0) | Northeastern (22–4–1) | Minnesota Duluth (20–9–0) | Minnesota Duluth (22–9–1) | Colgate (28–7–1) | Wisconsin (25–7–4) | 5. |
| 6. | Colgate | Minnesota Duluth (0–0–0) | Minnesota (0–2–0) | Minnesota (1–3–0) | Northeastern (4–2–0) | Northeastern (5–2–0) | Minnesota Duluth (4–4–0) | Minnesota Duluth (4–4–0) | Quinnipiac (11–1–2) | Yale (7–2–1) | Colgate (15–4–1) | Colgate (15–4–1) | Colgate (15–4–1) | Colgate (15–4–1) | Colgate (16–4–1) | Colgate (17–4–1) | Harvard (14–5–0) | Harvard (15–5–0) | Harvard (17–6–0) | Yale (21–5–1) | Harvard (21–7–1) | Quinnipiac (25–8–3) | Yale (25–8–1) | 6. |
| 7. | Boston College | Boston College (0–0–0) | Minnesota Duluth (1–1–0) | Minnesota Duluth (2–2–0) | Quinnipiac (6–0–2) | Minnesota Duluth (4–4–0) | Boston College (6–2–0) | Boston College (6–2–0) | Clarkson (11–1–2) т | Minnesota Duluth (6–4–0) | Yale (9–3–1) | Yale (9–3–1) | Yale (10–3–1) | Yale (10–3–1) | Clarkson (17–2–3) | Clarkson (17–2–3) | Quinnipiac (17–4–3) | Colgate (20–5–1) | Yale (18–5–1) | Harvard (19–7–0) | Yale (22–6–1) | Yale (24–7–1) | Quinnipiac (25–9–3) | 7. |
| 8. | Cornell | Cornell (0–0–0) | Quinnipiac (4–0–0) | Quinnipiac (6–0–0) | Minnesota Duluth (2–4–0) | Quinnipiac (6–0–2) | Quinnipiac (8–0–2) | Quinnipiac (10–0–2) | Minnesota Duluth (4–4–0) т | Colgate (13–4–1) | Clarkson (14–2–2) | Clarkson (15–2–3) | Minnesota Duluth (9–7–0) | Minnesota Duluth (11–7–0) | Yale (10–3–1) | Minnesota Duluth (13–7–0) | Yale (14–4–1) | Quinnipiac (18–5–3) | Colgate (21–7–1) | Colgate (23–7–1) | Colgate (26–7–1) | Minnesota Duluth (24–10–1) | Minnesota Duluth (24–11–1) | 8. |
| 9. | Penn State | Princeton (0–0–0) | Cornell (0–0–0) | Cornell (0–0–0) т | Providence (2–0–2) | Cornell (1–1–0) | Harvard (3–1–0) | Clarkson (9–1–2) | Yale (6–2–0) | Clarkson (12–2–2) | Harvard (7–3–0) т | Minnesota Duluth (8–6–0) | Clarkson (15–2–3) | Clarkson (15–2–3) | Minnesota Duluth (11–7–0) | Harvard (11–5–0) | Colgate (18–5–1) | Yale (16–5–1) | Clarkson (21–6–3) т | Quinnipiac (21–7–3) | Quinnipiac (23–8–3) | Harvard (22–9–1) | Harvard (22–9–1) | 9. |
| 10. | Princeton | Quinnipiac (2–0–0) | Princeton (0–0–0) | Providence (2–0–0) т | Cornell (0–0–0) | Harvard (2–0–0) | Clarkson (7–1–2) | Harvard (4–2–0) | Princeton (5–1–0) | Harvard (6–3–0) т Princeton (5–2–1) т | Minnesota Duluth (7–5–0) т | Harvard (9–3–0) | Harvard (9–3–0) | Connecticut (14–4–2) т Harvard (9–5–0) т | Harvard (9–5–0) | Yale (11–4–1) | Clarkson (18–3–3) | Connecticut (20–6–2) т Vermont (17–9–2) т | Quinnipiac (19–7–3) т | Clarkson (22–7–3) | Clarkson (22–9–3) | Vermont (22–10–3) | Clarkson (22–11–3) | 10. |
| | Preseason Sep 20 | Week 1 Sep 27 | Week 2 Oct 4 | Week 3 Oct 11 | Week 4 Oct 18 | Week 5 Oct 25 | Week 6 Nov 1 | Week 7 Nov 8 | Week 8 Nov 15 | Week 9 Nov 22 | Week 10 Nov 29 | Week 11 Dec 6 | Week 12 Dec 13 | Week 13 Jan 3 | Week 14 Jan 10 | Week 15 Jan 17 | Week 16 Jan 24 | Week 17 Jan 31 | Week 18 Feb 7 | Week 19 Feb 14 | Week 20 Feb 21 | Week 21 Feb 28 | Final Mar 7 | |
| | | Dropped: Penn State | None | Dropped: Princeton | None | Dropped: Providence | Dropped: Cornell | None | Dropped: Boston College; Harvard | None | Dropped: Princeton | None | None | None | Dropped: Connecticut | None | None | Dropped: Clarkson | Dropped: Vermont; Connecticut | None | None | Dropped: Clarkson | Dropped: Vermont | |

== USA Today ==
| | Preseason Sep 14 | Week 2 Sep 21 | Week 3 Sep 28 | Week 4 Oct 5 | Week 5 Oct 12 | Week 6 Oct 19 | Week 7 Oct 26 | Week 8 Nov 2 | Week 9 Nov 9 | Week 10 Nov 16 | Week 11 Nov 23 | Week 12 Nov 30 | Week 13 Dec 7 | Week 14 Dec 14 | Week 15 Jan 4 | Week 16 Jan 11 | Week 17 Jan 18 | Week 18 Jan 25 | Week 19 Feb 1 | Week 20 Feb 8 | Week 21 Feb 15 | Week 22 Feb 22 | Week 23 Mar 1 | Final Mar 8 | |
|---|---|---|---|---|---|---|---|---|---|---|---|---|---|---|---|---|---|---|---|---|---|---|---|---|---|
| 1. | Wisconsin (18) | Wisconsin (0–0–0) (18) | Wisconsin (2–0–0) (19) | Wisconsin (4–0–0) (18) | Wisconsin (6–0–0) (19) | Wisconsin (8–0–0) (19) | Wisconsin (10–0–0) (19) | Wisconsin (12–0–0) (19) | Wisconsin (13–0–1) (19) | Wisconsin (13–0–1) (19) | Wisconsin (15–0–1) (19) | Wisconsin (15–0–1) (19) | Wisconsin (15–1–2) (16) | Wisconsin (17–1–2) (19) | Wisconsin (18–1–3) (19) | Wisconsin (18–1–3) (18) | Wisconsin (18–1–3) (19) | Northeastern (21–2–1) (7) | Minnesota (20–7–1) (10) | Minnesota (22–7–1) (15) | Minnesota (24–7–1) (18) | Minnesota (26–7–1) (16) | Minnesota (28–7–1) (18) | Ohio State (29–6–0) (17) | 1. |
| 2. | Northeastern (1) | Northeastern (0–0–0) (1) | Northeastern (0–0–0) | Northeastern (2–0–0) | Ohio State (4–0–0) | Ohio State (6–0–0) | Ohio State (6–2–0) | Ohio State (8–2–0) | Ohio State (10–2–0) | Ohio State (10–2–0) | Ohio State (12–2–0) | Ohio State (14–2–0) | Ohio State (15–3–0) | Ohio State (15–3–0) | Ohio State (15–3–0) | Ohio State (17–3–0) (1) | Ohio State (17–3–0) | Ohio State (18–4–0) (5) | Ohio State (19–5–0) (6) | Ohio State (21–5–0) (3) | Wisconsin (23–4–4) | Ohio State (25–6–0) | Ohio State (27–6–0) (1) | Minnesota (29–8–1) (1) | 2. |
| 3. | Ohio State | Ohio State (0–0–0) | Ohio State (2–0–0) | Ohio State (4–0–0) (1) | Colgate (6–0–0) | Colgate (8–0–0) | Minnesota (5–3–0) | Minnesota (7–3–0) | Minnesota (7–3–0) | Minnesota (9–3–0) | Minnesota (11–3–0) | Northeastern (14–2–1) | Minnesota (13–4–1) (1) | Northeastern (16–2–1) | Northeastern (16–2–1) | Northeastern (18–2–1) | Northeastern (19–2–1) | Wisconsin (18–3–3) (3) | Wisconsin (20–3–4) (1) | Wisconsin (21–4–4) | Ohio State (23–6–0) | Northeastern (27–4–2) | Northeastern (28–4–2) | Northeastern (30–4–2) (1) | 3. |
| 4. | Minnesota Duluth т | Minnesota Duluth (0–0–0) | Minnesota (0–0–0) | Colgate (4–0–0) | Boston College (3–0–0) | Minnesota (3–3–0) | Colgate (8–2–0) | Colgate (10–2–0) | Northeastern (8–2–1) | Northeastern (10–2–1) | Northeastern (12–2–1) | Quinnipiac (15–1–2) | Northeastern (14–2–1) (1) | Quinnipiac (15–1–2) | Quinnipiac (15–2–3) | Minnesota (16–5–1) | Quinnipiac (16–3–3) | Minnesota (19–6–1) (4) | Northeastern (21–3–1) (1) | Minnesota Duluth (18–9–0) | Northeastern (25–4–1) | Wisconsin (23–6–4) | Wisconsin (25–6–4) | Colgate (30–7–1) | 4. |
| 5. | Minnesota т | Minnesota (0–0–0) | Minnesota Duluth (0–0–0) | Minnesota (0–2–0) | Minnesota (1–3–0) | Boston College (5–0–0) | Boston College (6–0–0) | Northeastern (7–2–0) | Colgate (11–3–0) | Colgate (13–3–0) | Quinnipiac (13–1–2) | Minnesota (12–4–0) | Quinnipiac (15–1–2) (1) | Minnesota (14–5–1) | Minnesota (14–5–1) | Quinnipiac (15–3–3) | Minnesota (17–6–1) | Minnesota Duluth (14–8–0) | Minnesota Duluth (16–8–0) | Northeastern (22–4–1) | Minnesota Duluth (20–9–0) | Minnesota Duluth (22–9–1) | Colgate (28–7–1) | Wisconsin (25–7–4) | 5. |
| 6. | Colgate | Colgate (0–0–0) | Colgate (2–0–0) | Minnesota Duluth (1–1–0) | Northeastern (2–2–0) | Northeastern (4–2–0) | Minnesota Duluth (4–4–0) | Minnesota Duluth (4–4–0) | Minnesota Duluth (4–4–0) | Minnesota Duluth (4–4–0) | Minnesota Duluth (6–4–0) | Colgate (15–4–1) | Colgate (15–4–1) | Colgate (15–4–1) | Colgate (15–4–1) | Colgate (16–4–1) | Colgate (17–4–1) | Quinnipiac (17–4–3) | Harvard (15–5–0) | Harvard (17–6–0) | Yale (21–5–1) | Harvard (21–7–1) | Quinnipiac (25–8–3) | Yale (25–8–1) | 6. |
| 7. | Boston College | Cornell (0–0–0) | Cornell (0–0–0) | Boston College (2–0–0) | Minnesota Duluth (2–2–0) | Minnesota Duluth (2–4–0) | Quinnipiac (6–0–2) | Boston College (6–2–0) | Boston College (6–2–0) | Quinnipiac (11–1–2) | Yale (7–2–1) | Yale (9–3–1) | Minnesota Duluth (8–6–0) | Minnesota Duluth (9–7–0) | Minnesota Duluth (11–7–0) | Clarkson (17–2–3) | Clarkson (17–2–3) | Yale (14–4–1) | Quinnipiac (18–5–3) | Yale (18–5–1) | Harvard (19–7–1) | Yale (22–6–1) | Minnesota Duluth (24–10–1) | Quinnipiac (25–9–3) | 7. |
| 8. | Cornell | Boston College (0–0–0) | Boston College (0–0–0) | Cornell (0–0–0) | Quinnipiac (6–0–0) | Quinnipiac (6–0–2) | Northeastern (5–2–0) | Quinnipiac (8–0–2) | Quinnipiac (10–0–2) | Clarkson (11–1–2) | Colgate (13–4–1) | Clarkson (14–2–2) | Yale (9–3–1) | Yale (10–3–1) | Yale (10–3–1) | Minnesota Duluth (11–7–0) | Minnesota Duluth (13–7–0) | Harvard (14–5–0) | Colgate (20–5–1) | Colgate (21–7–1) | Colgate (23–7–1) | Colgate (26–7–1) | Yale (24–7–1) | Minnesota Duluth (24–11–1) | 8. |
| 9. | Princeton | Princeton (0–0–0) | Princeton (0–0–0) | Princeton (0–0–0) | Cornell (0–0–0) | Providence (2–0–2) | Cornell (1–1–0) | Harvard (3–1–0) | Clarkson (9–1–2) | Princeton (5–1–0) | Clarkson (12–2–2) | Minnesota Duluth (7–5–0) | Clarkson (15–2–3) | Clarkson (15–2–3) | Clarkson (15–2–3) | Yale (10–3–1) | Harvard (11–5–0) | Colgate (18–5–1) | Yale (16–5–1) | Quinnipiac (19–7–3) | Quinnipiac (21–7–3) | Quinnipiac (22–8–3) | Harvard (22–9–1) | Harvard (22–9–1) | 9. |
| 10. | Penn State | Penn State (0–0–0) | Clarkson (2–0–0) | Quinnipiac (4–0–0) | Providence (2–0–0) | Cornell (0–0–0) | Harvard (2–0–0) | Princeton (2–0–0) | Harvard (4–2–0) | Boston College (7–4–0) | Princeton (5–2–1) | Harvard (7–3–0) | Harvard (9–3–0) | Harvard (9–3–0) | Connecticut (14–4–2) | Connecticut (15–5–2) | Yale (11–4–1) | Clarkson (18–3–3) | Clarkson (19–5–3) | Clarkson (21–6–3) | Clarkson (22–7–3) | Vermont (21–10–3) | Vermont (22–10–3) | Clarkson (22–11–3) | 10. |
| | Preseason Sep 14 | Week 2 Sep 21 | Week 3 Sep 28 | Week 4 Oct 5 | Week 5 Oct 12 | Week 6 Oct 19 | Week 7 Oct 26 | Week 8 Nov 2 | Week 9 Nov 9 | Week 10 Nov 16 | Week 11 Nov 23 | Week 12 Nov 30 | Week 13 Dec 7 | Week 14 Dec 14 | Week 15 Jan 4 | Week 16 Jan 11 | Week 17 Jan 18 | Week 18 Jan 25 | Week 19 Feb 1 | Week 20 Feb 8 | Week 21 Feb 15 | Week 22 Feb 22 | Week 23 Mar 1 | Final Mar 8 | |
| | | None | Dropped: Penn State | Dropped: Clarkson | Dropped: Princeton | None | Dropped: Providence | Dropped: Cornell | Dropped: Princeton | Dropped: Harvard | Dropped: Boston College | Dropped: Princeton | None | None | Dropped: Harvard | None | Dropped: Connecticut | None | None | None | None | Dropped: Clarkson | None | Dropped: Vermont | |
