= Maureen Murphy (ice hockey) =

American ice hockey player (born 1999)

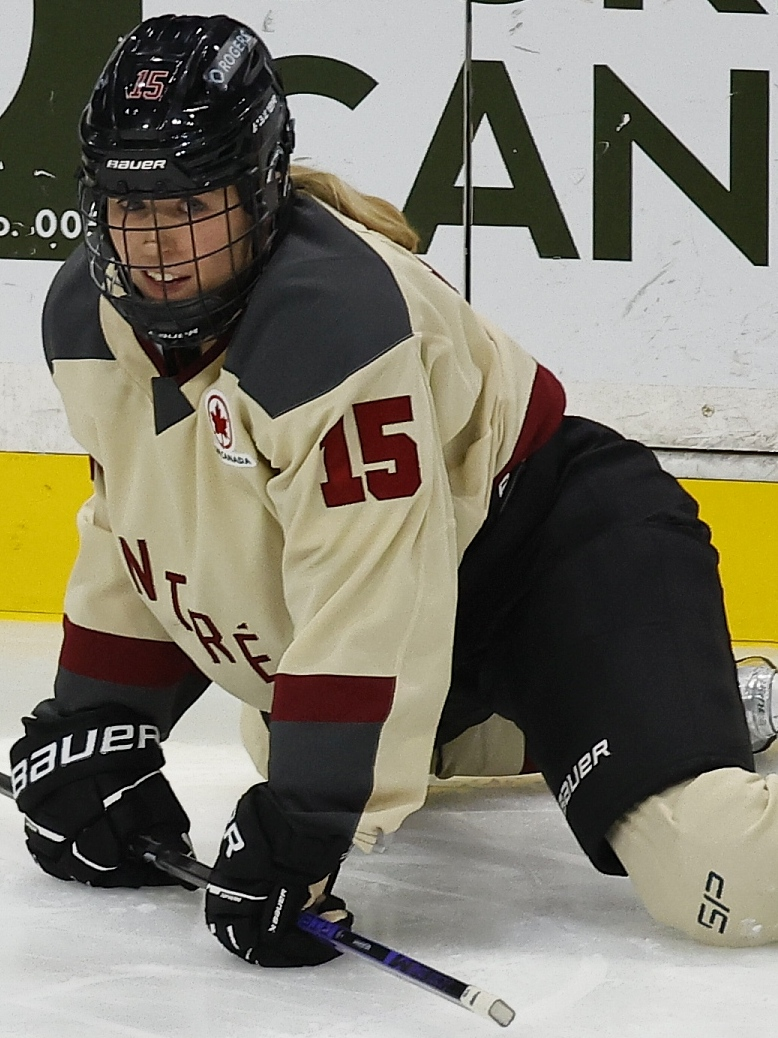
- Murphy with PWHL Montreal in 2024
- Born: December 15, 1999 (age 26) Buffalo, New York, US
- Height: 5 ft 4 in (163 cm)
- Weight: 141 lb (64 kg; 10 st 1 lb)
- Position: Forward
- Shoots: Right
- PWHL team Former teams: Vegas Vanguards; Montreal Victoire
- National team: United States
- Playing career: 2017–present

Maureen Margaret Murphy (born December 15, 1999) is an American professional ice hockey player for the Vegas Vanguards of the Professional Women's Hockey League (PWHL). She previously played for the Montreal Victoire of the PWHL. She played college ice hockey at Providence and Northeastern.

== Early life ==
Murphy was born to Don and Jennifer Murphy. She has one sister Hannah. She attended Shattuck-Saint Mary's for three years, and won national championships in all three seasons. During the 2016–17 season she led the team in scoring with 48 goals and 43 assists.

== Playing career ==
=== College ===
Murphy began her collegiate career at Providence during the 2017–18 season. During her freshman year, she recorded 19 goals and nine assists in 36 games to lead the team in scoring. She led the nation in shorthanded goals with four. She scored her first collegiate goal in her debut game on October 29, 2018. She scored her first career hat-trick on January 13, 2018, in a game against Boston. Following the season she was unanimously named to the Hockey East All-Rookie Team and Hockey East Second Team All-Star.

During the 2018–19 season, she recorded 22 goals and 21 assists in 37 games. She ranked first on the team in points, goals, assists, shots (192) and plus-minus (+27). Her eight game-winning goals ranked second-best in the nation. Murphy helped Providence to a perfect 8–0 record in November, scoring five of the Friars' game-winning goals in the month, a total that led all NCAA players. She recorded eight goals and six assists, tied for the most goals and second-most points of any WHEA player in during month. She was subsequently named the Hockey East Player of the Month, and Women's Hockey Commissioners' Association's National Player of the Month for the month of November 2018. Following the season she was named a Hockey East Second Team All-Star and named Providence's Offensive Player of the Year.

During the 2019–20 season, she scored seven goals and four assists in 11 games, in a season that was shortened due to injury. In June 2020, Murphy announced she would transfer to Northeastern. She finished her career at Providence with 48 goals, 34 assists and 82 points in 84 games over three seasons. In January 2021, she was granted immediate eligibility for the remainder of the 2021 season. During the 2020–21 season, she recorded seven goals and 11 assists in 16 games, in a season that was shortened due to the COVID-19 pandemic.

During the 2021–22 season, she recorded 30 goals and 26 assists in 37 games. She led the NCAA in goals (30), hat tricks (4) and power-play goals (13). During the national quarterfinals of the NCAA Division I women's ice hockey tournament she scored the game-winning goal against Wisconsin to help Northeastern advance to the Frozen Four for the second consecutive year. She was subsequently named the Hockey East Player of the Week. Following the season she was named Hockey East First Team All-Star.

During the 2022–23 season, she recorded 20 goals and 35 assists in 33 games. She averaged 1.67 points per game, which ranked third-best in the NCAA. During the 2023 Beanpot, she recorded both game-winning goals against Boston University and Boston College to lead the Huskies to their 18th championship and was named MVP. On January 14, 2023, Murphy scored two goals in a game against Maine to reach the 100 goals milestone. Following the season she was named Hockey East Second Team All-Star and a top-ten finalist for the Patty Kazmaier Award. She became the 12th Northeastern player to be named a finalist for the award. She finished her collegiate career with 105 goals and 106 assists in 170 games.

=== Professional ===
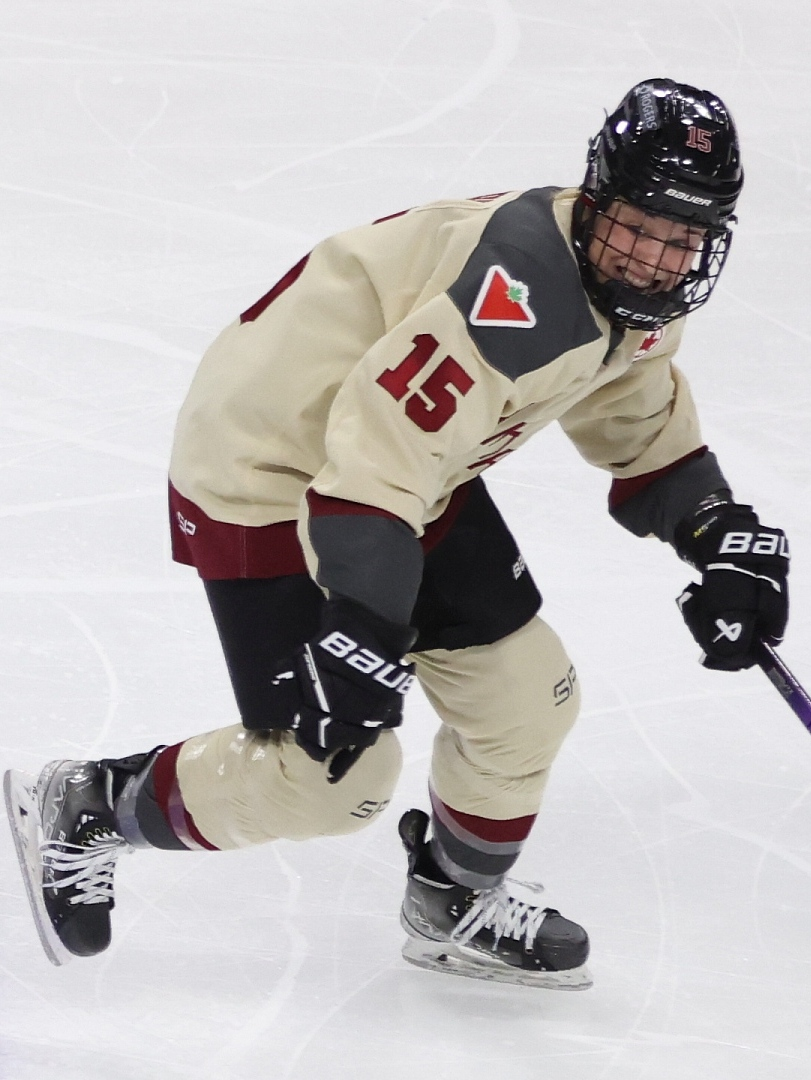
Murphy with PWHL Montreal in 2024

On September 18, 2023, Murphy was drafted in the third round, 18th overall, by PWHL Montreal in the 2023 PWHL Draft. On November 29, 2023, she signed a three-year contract with Montreal. During the 2023–24 season she recorded five goals and 11 assists in 24 regular season games and one goal and two assists in three games during the Walter Cup. Following the season she was awarded the Hockey for All Award, for her leadership and positive change in the community. In December, she was elected as the team's player representative at the PWHL Players Association, the league's union, replacing Laura Stacey, who was elected president of the Association. During the 2024–25 season, she recorded three goals and three assists in 28 regular season games and two goals in four games during the 2025 PWHL playoffs. During the 2025–26 season, she recorded four goals and three assists in 21 regular season games and one goal and two assists in nine games during the 2026 Walter Cup playoffs to help the Victoire win the 2026 Walter Cup.

During the league's expansion to 12 teams ahead of the 2026–27 season, she signed a one-year contract with the Vegas Vanguards on June 12, 2026.

== International play ==
Murphy represented the United States at the 2017 IIHF World Women's U18 Championship, where she recorded one goal in three games and won a gold medal.

== Personal life ==
Murphy's favorite postgame meal is chocolate milk, chicken, veggies and whole wheat pasta. Outside of hockey, her hobbies include outdoors, trying new foods and restaurants, and hanging with family.

== Career statistics ==
=== Regular season and playoffs ===
			Regular season					Playoffs
Season	Team	League	GP	G	A	Pts	PIM	GP	G	A	Pts	PIM
2017–18	Providence College	WHEA	36	19	9	28	4	—	—	—	—	—
2018–19	Providence College	WHEA	37	22	21	43	16	—	—	—	—	—
2019–20	Providence College	WHEA	11	7	4	11	8	—	—	—	—	—
2020–21	Northeastern University	WHEA	16	7	11	18	2	—	—	—	—	—
2021–22	Northeastern University	WHEA	37	30	26	56	10	—	—	—	—	—
2022–23	Northeastern University	WHEA	33	20	35	55	8	—	—	—	—	—
2023–24	PWHL Montreal	PWHL	24	5	11	16	4	3	1	2	3	2
2024–25	Montreal Victoire	PWHL	28	3	3	6	10	4	2	0	2	2
2025–26	Montreal Victoire	PWHL	21	4	3	7	1	9	1	2	3	2
PWHL totals			73	12	17	29	14	16	4	4	8	6

=== International ===
Year	Team	Event	Result	GP	G	A	Pts	PIM
2017	United States	U18	1st place, gold medalist(s)	3	1	0	1	0
Junior totals				3	1	0	1	0

== Awards and honours ==
Honours	Year
PWHL
Walter Cup champion	2026
