= 2021–22 NCAA Division I women's ice hockey season =

- NCAA tournament: 2022
- National championship: Pegula Ice Arena; State College, Pennsylvania
- NCAA champion: Ohio State
- Patty Kazmaier Award: Taylor Heise (Minnesota)

The 2021–22 NCAA Division I women's ice hockey season began in September 2021 and ended with the 2022 NCAA National Collegiate Women's Ice Hockey Tournament's championship game at Pegula Ice Arena in State College, Pennsylvania on March 20, 2022.

== Regular season ==
=== Realignment ===
In 2019 the Minnesota Intercollegiate Athletic Conference, an NCAA Division III league, took the unprecedented step of removing St. Thomas from its membership because of concerns about "athletic competitive parity." Because the removal affected all sports and was effective at the end of the 2020–21 season, St. Thomas had time to decide what it would do next. The women's ice hockey program was given the green light to jump directly to the Division I level in July 2020. The women's hockey team joined the WCHA for the 2021–22 season.

On May 26, 2021, Robert Morris announced that it was dropping both men's and women's hockey effective immediately.

=== Standings ===
- 2021–22 College Hockey America standings
  	Conference							Overall					
  	GP	W	L	T	PTS	GF	GA	GP	W	L	T	GF	GA
  Syracuse † *	16	11	4	1	23	50	34	32	15	11	6	85	81
  Penn State	14	8	3	3	19	37	23	33	18	10	5	96	57
  Mercyhurst	16	10	6	0	20	53	32	35	21	12	2	107	73
  Lindenwood	14	4	9	1	14	34	49	29	6	22	1	71	134
  RIT	16	1	12	3	5	21	57	33	2	27	4	52	148
  Championship: February 26, 2022 † indicates conference regular season champion; * indicates conference tournament champion Rankings: USCHO.com; updated March 20, 2022
- 2021–22 ECAC Hockey standings
  	Conference							Overall					
  	GP	W	L	T	PTS	GF	GA	GP	W	L	T	GF	GA
  #9 Harvard †	22	16	5	1	50.5	17	11	33	22	10	1	113	72
  #5 Yale	22	16	5	1	49.5	12	5	36	26	9	1	123	55
  #7 Colgate *	22	16	5	1	45.5	16	11	39	30	8	1	146	69
  #8 Quinnipiac	22	15	7	0	45	11	5	39	26	10	3	121	59
  #10 Clarkson	22	13	8	1	41.5	14	4	37	22	12	3	106	71
  Cornell	22	12	8	2	38	7	18	30	14	14	2	73	73
  St. Lawrence	22	10	8	4	38	9	8	37	15	15	7	89	80
  Princeton	22	9	10	3	30.5	13	5	33	13	15	5	58	65
  Brown	22	6	12	4	24	9	18	29	6	18	5	52	89
  RPI	22	5	17	0	17	14	11	32	9	23	0	57	80
  Dartmouth	22	3	18	1	10.5	13	18	29	9	19	1	64	98
  Union	22	2	20	0	6	6	27	34	5	28	1	42	136
  Championship: March 10, 2022 † indicates conference regular season champion; * indicates conference tournament champion Rankings: USCHO.com; updated March 20, 2022
- 2021–22 NEWHA standings
  	Conference							Overall					
  	GP	W	L	T	PTS	GF	GA	GP	W	L	T	GF	GA
  Franklin Pierce	20	16	4	0	32	0	0	32	22	9	1	0	0
  LIU	20	15	3	2	32	0	0	35	17	15	3	0	0
  Saint Anselm	20	11	6	3	25	0	0	32	16	13	3	0	0
  Sacred Heart	21	11	6	2	24	0	0	33	16	15	2	0	0
  Post	21	3	18	0	6	0	0	32	6	26	0	0	0
  Saint Michael's	20	1	18	1	3	0	0	27	3	23	1	0	0
  Championship: March 8, 2022 † indicates conference regular season champion; * indicates conference tournament champion Rankings: USCHO.com; updated: July 6, 2022
- 2021–22 Western Collegiate Hockey Association standings
  	Conference								Overall					
  	GP	W	L	T	SW	PTS	GF	GA	GP	W	L	T	GF	GA
  #4 Minnesota †	28	21	6	1	1	68	122	57	39	29	9	1	169	72
  #1 Ohio State*	27	21	6	0	0	63	125	43	38	32	6	0	175	58
  #6 Wisconsin	27	18	6	3	2	57	98	44	38	26	8	4	144	56
  #2 Minnesota Duluth	28	19	8	1	0	58	102	54	40	27	12	1	137	84
  Minnesota State	28	10	17	1	1	32	61	100	35	15	19	1	95	120
  Bemidji State	28	8	18	2	0	25	43	104	34	11	20	3	55	117
  St. Cloud State	27	4	20	3	2	17	43	100	35	9	23	3	65	124
  St. Thomas	27	3	23	1	0	10	31	123	33	5	27	1	41	142
  Championship: March 6, 2022 † indicates conference regular season champion; * indicates conference tournament champion Rankings: USCHO.com; updated March 20, 2022
- 2021–22 WHEA standings
  	Conference							Overall					
  	GP	W	L	T	PTS	GF	GA	GP	W	L	T	GF	GA
  #3 Northeastern †*	26	21	3	2	67	96	27	38	31	5	2	136	40
  Vermont	27	18	7	2	57	86	56	36	22	11	3	107	76
  UConn	27	16	7	4	50	66	49	37	24	9	4	99	64
  Boston College	26	16	9	1	47	71	63	34	19	14	1	88	84
  Maine	26	12	13	1	41	57	59	35	15	19	1	75	87
  Boston University	25	11	9	5	39	57	58	33	12	15	6	70	82
  Providence	27	12	12	3	39	52	53	36	16	14	6	67	67
  New Hampshire	26	9	16	1	30	51	74	34	11	21	2	71	95
  Merrimack	27	6	20	1	20	53	86	34	8	25	1	61	116
  Holy Cross	27	1	26	0	6	36	100	33	3	30	0	46	120
  Championship: March 8, 2022 † indicates conference regular season champion; * indicates conference tournament champion Rankings: USCHO.com; updated March 20, 2022

== Player stats ==
=== Scoring leaders ===
The following players lead the NCAA in points at the conclusion of games played on March 20, 2022.

Player	Class	Team	GP	G	A	Pts
Taylor Heise	Senior	Minnesota	39	29	37	66
Élizabeth Giguère	Graduate Student	Minnesota Duluth	39	21	40	61
Sophie Jaques	Senior	Ohio State	37	21	38	59
Gabbie Hughes	Senior	Minnesota Duluth	39	22	37	59
Abigail Boreen	Senior	Minnesota	39	25	34	59
Daryl Watts	Graduate Student	Wisconsin	38	28	29	57
Maureen Murphy	Senior	Northeastern	37	30	26	56
Casey O'Brien	Sophomore	Wisconsin	38	27	28	55
Danielle Serdachny	Junior	Colgate	39	15	38	53
Makenna Webster	Sophomore	Wisconsin	38	23	30	53
Kristýna Kaltounková	Sophomore	Colgate	38	28	25	53

=== Leading goaltenders ===
The following goaltenders lead the NCAA in goals against average.
GP = Games played; Min = Minutes played; W = Wins; L = Losses; T = Ties; GA = Goals against; SO = Shutouts; SV% = Save percentage; GAA = Goals against average

Player	Class	Team	GP	Min	W	L	T	GA	SO	SV%	GAA
Suzette Faucher	Sophomore	Franklin Pierce	19	1094:54	15	2	1	18	8	0.961	0.99
Aerin Frankel	Graduate Student	Northeastern	32	1911:04	25	4	2	34	11	0.956	1.07
Pia Dukarič	Freshman	Yale	13	757:03	9	3	1	15	5	.937	1.19
Amanda Thiele	Sophomore	Ohio State	22	1311:58	17	3	0	28	4	.941	1.28
Megan Warrener	Freshman	UConn	17	980:34	12	3	1	21	5	.944	1.28

== NCAA tournament ==
First round March 10; BigTen+, CollegeSportsLive
Quinnipiac	4
Syracuse	0
Minnesota Duluth	4
Harvard	0
Wisconsin	3
Clarkson	1

National quarterfinals March 12; BigTen+, CollegeSportsLive, ESPN+
1	Ohio State	4**
Quinnipiac	3
4	Colgate	1
5	Yale	2*
2	Minnesota	1
Minnesota Duluth	2
3	Northeastern	4
Wisconsin	2

National semifinals March 18; ESPN+
1	Ohio State	2
5	Yale	1
Minnesota Duluth	2**
3	Northeastern	1

National championship March 20; ESPN+
1	Ohio State	3
Minnesota Duluth	2

Note: each * denotes one overtime period
